= List of Brøndby IF seasons =

Danish professional football club

Brøndbyernes Idrætsforening is a Danish professional football club based in Brøndby Municipality, in the western suburbs of Copenhagen. Founded in 1964 as a merger between two local clubs, Brøndby IF has been a member of the Danish league system since 1967, reaching the then top-flight Danish 1st Division. The club became a professional outfit in 1987.

Brøndby IF has won 11 Danish league championships, eight Danish Cup titles, and three Danish Supercup titles. Internationally, their best performance came in the 1990–91 UEFA Cup, where they reached the semi-finals, the furthest any Danish club has advanced in a major UEFA competition. They have also reached the group stage of the UEFA Champions League once, in the 1998–99 season.

The club has played continuously in the top division of Danish football since 1981. As of the end of the 2024–25 season, Brøndby IF has competed in 44 consecutive top-flight seasons and taken part in more than 1,500 competitive matches in domestic and European competitions.

This list details the club's achievements in major competitions and the top goalscorers for each season since entering the top flight in 1982. Top scorers in bold were also the highest scorers in the Danish league that season. Minor competitions, such as regional cups and pre-season tournaments, are excluded.

== Key ==
EC1	European Cup/UEFA Champions League
EC2	UEFA Cup Winners' Cup
EC3	UEFA Cup/UEFA Europa League

== Seasons ==
Season	League			Danish Cup	Europe	Others
Season	Pos.	Competition	Top scorer	Danish Cup	Europe	Others
1981-82	4	1982 1st Division	Michael Laudrup (15)	4th round		
1982-83	4	1983 1st Division	Brian Chrøis (12)	4th round		
1983-84	4	1984 1st Division	Jens Kolding (11)	3rd round		
1984-85	1	1985 1st Division	Claus Nielsen (17)	3rd round		
1985-86	2	1986 1st Division	Claus Nielsen (16)	Quarter-final		
1986-87	1	1987 1st Division	Claus Nielsen (20)	4th round	EC1 quarter-final	
1987-88	1	1988 1st Division	Bent Christensen (21)	Finalist	EC3 2nd round	
1988-89	2	1989 1st Division	Bent Christensen (10)	Winner	EC1 1st round	
1989-90	1	1990 1st Division	Bent Christensen (17)	Quarter-final	EC1 1st round	
1990-91	1	1991 Superliga	Bent Christensen (11)	Semi-final	EC3 semi-final	
1991-92	7	1991-92 Superliga	Kim Vilfort (9)	4th round	EC1 2nd round	
1992-93	3	1992-93 Superliga	Kim Vilfort (10)	5th round		
1993-94	3	1993-94 Superliga	Mark Strudal (13)	Winner	EC3 3rd round	
1994-95	2	1994-95 Superliga	Mark Strudal (12)	Quarter-final	EC2 2nd round	Danish Supercup winner
1995-96	1	1995-96 Superliga	Peter Møller (15)	Finalist	EC3 3rd round	
1996-97	1	1996-97 Superliga	Peter Møller (22)	Semi-final	EC1 qualification round EC3 quarter-final	Danish Supercup winner
1997-98	1	1997-98 Superliga	Ebbe Sand (28)	Winner	EC1 qual 2nd round EC3 1st round	Danish Supercup winner
1998-99	2	1998-99 Superliga	Ebbe Sand (19)	Semi-final	EC1 group stage	
1999-00	2	1999-00 Superliga	Bent Christensen (13)	Semi-final	EC1 qual 3rd round EC3 1st round	
2000-01	2	2000-01 Superliga	Peter Graulund (21)	Quarter-final	EC1 qual 3rd round EC3 1st round	
2001-02	1	2001-02 Superliga	Peter Madsen (22)	5th round	EC3 3rd round	
2002-03	2	2002-03 Superliga	Mattias Jonson (11)	Winner	EC1 qual 3rd round EC3 1st round	Danish Supercup winner
2003-04	2	2003-04 Superliga	Thomas Kahlenberg (11)	Semi-final	EC3 3rd round	
2004-05	1	2004-05 Superliga	Thomas Kahlenberg (13)	Winner	EC3 qual 2nd round	Royal League group stage
2005-06	2	2005-06 Superliga	Johan Elmander (13)	Semi-final	EC1 qual 3rd round EC3 group stage	Royal League group stage Danish League Cup winner
2006-07	6	2006-07 Superliga	Morten Rasmussen (15)	4th round	EC3 1st round	Royal League winner Danish League Cup winner
2007-08	8	2007-08 Superliga	Morten Rasmussen (7); Martin Ericsson (7)	Winner		
2008-09	3	2008-09 Superliga	Morten Rasmussen (9); Alexander Farnerud (9); Ousman Jallow (9)	Semi-final	EC3 1st round	
2009-10	3	2009-10 Superliga	Morten Rasmussen (12)	4th round	EC3 qual play-off round	
2010-11	3	2010-11 Superliga	Michael Krohn-Dehli (11)			
2011-12	9	2011-12 Superliga	Simon Makienok Christoffersen (10)			

== Sources ==
- Brøndby IF season results
- Brøndby IF match calendar 1995-present
- Haslund.info
- HvemVandt.dk
