= 1988–89 Danish Cup =

Tournament details
- Country: Denmark

Final positions
- Champions: Brøndby IF
- Runners-up: Ikast fS

The 1988–89 Danish Cup was the 35th season of the Danish Cup, the highest football competition in Denmark. The final was played on 4 May 1989.

== First round ==
Team 1	Score	Team 2
IF AIA-Tranbjerg	1–3	Thisted FC
Albertslund IF	1–0	B.93
B 1901	3–0	FIF Hillerød
B 1909	9–0	Munkebo BK
B 1913	3–0	Varde IF
Ballerup IF	3–0	B 1921
IF Skjold Birkerød	5–2	Maribo BK
BK Dalgas	0–5	Hasle BK
Dragør BK	6–3	Ryvang FC
Esbjerg fB	4–1	Odense KFUM
Fredericia KFUM	2–0	Nakskov BK
BK Frem	2–1	AB
Fremad Amager	1–3	Køge BK
BK Fremad Valby	0–1	Ølstykke FC
Galten FS	5–1	Als BK
Gladsaxe-Hero BK	0–1	Skovlunde Fodbold
Glostrup IC	1–4	Holbæk B&I
Grimstrup IF	1–2	Svendborg fB
Helsingør IF	1–0	Greve IF
Herlufsholm GF	1–3	IK Viking Rønne
Herning Fremad	1–0	Skive IK
Hjørring IF	1–3	Hjørring AIK Frem
Humlebæk BK	2–1	Hellas BK Valby
IF Hasle Fuglebakken	w/o	Ulkebøl FK
Jyderup BK	1–2	BK Avarta
Kalundborg GB	1–2	OKS
Langtved SG&IF	0–0 (a.e.t.) (5–4 p)	B 47 Esbjerg
Lindholm IF	4–2	Horsens fS
Næsbjerg-Rousthøje UI	3–1	Kværndrup BK
Nørresundby BK	6–0	Tved BK
Nyborg G&IF	1–0 (a.e.t.)	Holstebro BK
Ringsted IF	2–3	Hvidovre IF
IK Skovbakken	3–0	Kolding IF
Skovshoved IF	1–4	Kastrup BK
Stubbekøbing BK	2–0	Gentofte-Vangede IF
Tårnby BK	3–1	Holmegaard GB
Vanløse IF	2–3	Roskilde BK
Viborg FF	1–2	Slagelse B&I
Vissenbjerg G&IF	1–3	Aabenraa BK
Aalborg Chang	1–0	Brande IF

== Second round ==
Team 1	Score	Team 2
Albertslund IF	0–2	BK Avarta
B 1901	1–3	IF Skjold Birkerød
B 1909	3–2 (a.e.t.)	Aalborg Chang
Brønshøj BK	1–4	KB
Dragør BK	4–3	IK Viking Rønne
Esbjerg fB	3–0	IF Hasle Fuglebakken
Fredericia KFUM	1–3	B 1913
BK Frem	5–0	Ballerup IF
Helsingør IF	4–2	Tårnby BK
Hjørring AIK Frem	0–1 (a.e.t.)	Svendborg fB
Humlebæk BK	0–2 (a.e.t.)	Kastrup BK
Hvidovre IF	5–1	Skovlunde Fodbold
Langtved SG&IF	0–6	Nørresundby BK
Lindholm IF	0–1	Herning Fremad
Nyborg G&IF	1–0	Galten FS
Roskilde BK	5–2	Holbæk B&I
Slagelse B&I	2–1 (a.e.t.)	IK Skovbakken
Stubbekøbing BK	1–3 (a.e.t.)	Hasle BK
Thisted FC	2–2 (a.e.t.) (5–4 p)	OKS
AaB	1–0	Randers Freja
Aabenraa BK	3–1	Næsbjerg-Rousthøje UI
Ølstykke FC	2–0	Køge BK

== Third round ==
Team 1	Score	Team 2
BK Avarta	4–1	Nyborg G&IF
B 1903	1–0 (a.e.t.)	B 1913
IF Skjold Birkerød	1–3	Helsingør IF
Dragør BK	1–3	B 1909
Esbjerg fB	3–2	Nørresundby BK
BK Frem	0–1	Ølstykke FC
Hasle BK	0–1	Kastrup BK
Herfølge BK	2–0	Vejle BK
Herning Fremad	0–1	Silkeborg IF
Hvidovre IF	3–1	Thisted FC
KB	0–1 (a.e.t.)	AaB
Lyngby BK	0–2	Brøndby IF
Næstved IF	2–2 (a.e.t.) (4–1 p)	Roskilde BK
Odense BK	1–1 (a.e.t.) (4–5 p)	AGF
Svendborg fB	0–3	Ikast FS
Aabenraa BK	8–1	Slagelse B&I

== Fourth round ==
Team 1	Score	Team 2
B 1903	2–0	Helsingør IF
Brøndby IF	8–0	Aabenraa BK
Herfølge BK	0–1	Esbjerg fB
Hvidovre IF	2–1	B 1909
Ikast FS	4–0	Ølstykke FC
Kastrup BK	3–1 (a.e.t.)	BK Avarta
Næstved IF	0–2	AGF
AaB	2–1	Silkeborg IF

== Quarter-finals ==
Team 1	Score	Team 2
AGF	0–3	Ikast FS
B 1903	3–1	AaB
Brøndby IF	3–0 (a.e.t.)	Hvidovre IF
Kastrup BK	0–2	Esbjerg fB

== Semi-finals ==
Team 1	Agg.	Team 2	1st leg	2nd leg
Ikast FS	2–2 (a)	B 1903	1–0	1–2
Esbjerg fB	2–4	Brøndby IF	1–1	1–3

== Final ==
4 May 1989

Brøndby IF	6–3 (a.e.t.)	Ikast FS
Laudrup 15', 106'; Vilfort 39', 78', 113'; Nielsen 110'	Report	Granlund 6', 58', 68'

Københavns Idrætspark, Copenhagen
Attendance: 11,600
Referee: John P. Nielsen
