= 1987–88 Danish Cup =

Tournament details
- Country: Denmark

Final positions
- Champions: AGF
- Runners-up: Brøndby IF

The 1987–88 Danish Cup was the 34th season of the Danish Cup, the highest football competition in Denmark. The final was played on 12 May 1988.

== First round ==
Team 1	Score	Team 2
BK Avarta	10–0	Horslunde BK
B.93	1–2	Køge BK
B 1901	2–4	BK Frem
B 1908	0–2	Ringsted IF
B 1909	4–0	Asaa BK
B 1913	1–2	Svendborg fB
B 1921	2–3 (a.e.t.)	Roskilde BK
IF Skjold Birkerød	3–1	Nakskov BK
Bramming BK	1–4	Silkeborg IF
Dalum IF	4–0	Østre BK
Dragør BK	2–1	IK Viking Rønne
Frederikssund IK	3–0	Hørsholm-Usserød IK
BK Fremad Valby	1–0	Vordingborg IF
Galten FS	0–3	Frederikshavn fI
Gladsaxe-Hero BK	1–3 (a.e.t.)	AB
Haderslev FK	1–5	Nørresundby BK
Hasle BK	4–1	Valby BK
Herning Fremad	7–0	Horsens B40
Hjørring IF	2–1	Tved BK
Hobro IK	1–4	Randers Freja
Holbæk B&I	2–3	Helsingør IF
Holstebro BK	3–2	Kalundborg GB
Horsens fS	0–1	Esbjerg fB
Humlebæk BK	3–0	Albertslund IF
Jyderup BK	7–0	Kettinge Boldklub
Kolding IF	0–1	Viborg FF
LKB-Gistrup IF	2–1	Nørre Aaby IK
Næsbjerg-Rousthøje UI	3–0	SUB Ullerslev
OKS	9–1	Harlev IK
BK Pioneren	2–0	Herlev IF
Skive IK	4–1	Viby IF
Skovlunde Fodbold	1–3	Fremad Amager
Slagelse B&I	0–1	Tårnby BK
Sundby BK	0–2	Greve IF
Ulkebøl FK	4–6	Herning KFUM
Vanløse IF	1–0	Skovshoved IF
Varde IF	3–2	Fredericia KFUM
Viby Sjælland IF	0–6	Glostrup IC
Aabenraa BK	1–2	Aalborg Chang
Aarslev BK	3–4 (a.e.t.)	IK Skovbakken

== Second round ==
Team 1	Score	Team 2
AB	1–4 (a.e.t.)	Køge BK
BK Avarta	1–0	Roskilde BK
IF Skjold Birkerød	2–1	BK Fremad Valby
Frederikshavn fI	3–3 (a.e.t.) (9–10 p)	Jyderup BK
Frederikssund IK	0–1 (a.e.t.)	BK Frem
Glostrup IC	4–0	Hasle BK
Helsingør IF	4–0	BK Pioneren
Herfølge BK	3–2	Vanløse IF
Herning Fremad	0–1	Dalum IF
Hjørring IF	2–3	Svendborg fB
Holstebro BK	3–0	Aalborg Chang
Humlebæk BK	1–2 (a.e.t.)	Kastrup BK
Næsbjerg-Rousthøje UI	1–2	Viborg FF
Randers Freja	4–0	OKS
Ringsted IF	0–1	Lyngby BK
Silkeborg IF	6–0	LKB-Gistrup IF
Skive IK	0–3	Esbjerg fB
IK Skovbakken	6–2	Herning KFUM
Tårnby BK	4–2 (a.e.t.)	Dragør BK
Varde IF	1–5	Nørresundby BK
AaB	3–1	B 1909
Fremad Amager	3–2	Sundby BK

== Third round ==
Team 1	Score	Team 2
AGF	2–0	Lyngby BK
BK Avarta	1–4	Glostrup IC
B 1903	2–0	Tårnby BK
IF Skjold Birkerød	1–4	Odense BK
Brøndby IF	4–3	Viborg FF
Brønshøj BK	5–0	Hvidovre IF
Dalum IF	0–3	Fremad Amager
Esbjerg fB	1–2 (a.e.t.)	Vejle BK
BK Frem	3–0	Holstebro BK
Helsingør IF	4–1	Jyderup BK
Herfølge BK	1–0	KB
Ikast FS	3–0	IK Skovbakken
Kastrup IF	3–2	Køge BK
Nørresundby BK	2–3 (a.e.t.)	Silkeborg IF
Randers Freja	0–3	AaB
Svendborg fB	4–1	Næstved IF

== Fourth round ==
Team 1	Score	Team 2
AGF	3–1	AaB
Brøndby IF	6–0	Silkeborg IF
Fremad Amager	2–4 (a.e.t.)	BK Frem
Herfølge BK	2–0	Helsingør IF
Kastrup IF	0–2	Ikast FS
Odense BK	1–6	B 1903
Svendborg fB	1–3	Brønshøj BK
Vejle BK	4–2	Glostrup IC

== Quarter-finals ==
Team 1	Score	Team 2
AGF	1–0	B 1903
BK Frem	3–4	Brønshøj BK
Ikast FS	2–0	Herfølge BK
Vejle BK	0–4	Brøndby IF

== Semi-finals ==
Team 1	Agg.	Team 2	1st leg	2nd leg
Brøndby IF	4–2	Brønshøj BK	0–1	4–1
Ikast FS	1–4	AGF	1–1	0–3

== Final ==
12 May 1988

AGF	2–1 (a.e.t.)	Brøndby IF
Solér 76'; Lundkvist 96'	Report	Vilfort 90'

Københavns Idrætspark, Copenhagen
Attendance: 20,000
Referee: Peter Mikkelsen
