= 1992–93 Danish Cup =

Tournament details
- Country: Denmark

Final positions
- Champions: Odense BK
- Runners-up: AaB Fodbold

The 1992–93 Danish Cup was the 39th season of the Danish Cup, the highest football competition in Denmark. The final was played on 20 May 1993.

== First round ==
Team 1	Score	Team 2
Asaa BK	0–3 (a.e.t.)	Kolding BK
B 1901	1–5	IK Viking Rønne
Dalum IF	3–0	Aarslev BK
Dragør BK	4–1	Jægersborg BK
Frederikssund IK	1–5	Ballerup IF
Jyderup BK	2–2 (a.e.t.) (2–3 p)	Humlebæk BK
Kalundborg GB	2–5	Nakskov BK
Kolding IF	4–1	Sønderborg BK
BK Marienlyst	3–3 (a.e.t.) (4–1 p)	Middelfart G&BK
Nykøbing Mors IF	4–3	Frederikshavn fI
Skive IK	0–1	Hadsund BK
IK Skovbakken	3–0	Aabenraa BK
Skovshoved IF	4–0	Kløvermarkens fB
Slagelse B&I	4–0	Frem Sakskøbing
Solrød FC	4–1	BK Vestia
Sundby BK	1–3	Rosenhøj BK
Toksværd Olstrup Fodbold	4–1	B 1908
Tved BK	4–4 (a.e.t.) (2–4 p)	Spjald IF
Tårup IF	3–0	Albertslund BS 72
Vordingborg IF	5–4 (a.e.t.)	Hørsholm-Usserød IK
Vorup Frederiksberg BK	0–2	Varde IF
Aabyhøj IF	4–3	Hjørring IF
Aarhus Fremad	3–1	Vejen SF
Aars IK	4–0	Fjordager IF

== Second round ==
Team 1	Score	Team 2
Dalum IF	1–2 (a.e.t.)	Herning Fremad
Greve IF	1–5	BK Avarta
Hadsund BK	2–3 (a.e.t.)	Kolding BK
Holstebro BK	1–3	Randers SK Freja
Humlebæk BK	1–4	Dragør BK
Hvidovre IF	1–0	B.93
Kolding IF	2–0 (a.e.t.)	Aalborg Chang
BK Marienlyst	6–1	Aars IK
Nakskov BK	5–3 (a.e.t.)	Skovshoved IF
OKS	3–4 (a.e.t.)	FC Fredericia
Ringsted IF	1–3	AB
Rosenhøj BK	2–0	Solrød FC
Roskilde BK	4–0	IK Viking Rønne
IK Skovbakken	3–1	Aabyhøj IF
Slagelse B&I	0–2	Ølstykke FC
Toksværd Olstrup Fodbold	3–7	Ballerup IF
Tårup IF	0–2	Svendborg fB
Varde IF	1–2	Spjald IF
Vordingborg IF	1–3	Kastrup BK
Aarhus Fremad	1–2	Nykøbing Mors IF

== Third round ==
Team 1	Score	Team 2
BK Avarta	2–2 (a.e.t.) (5–4 p)	Ballerup IF
Brønshøj BK	1–0	Vanløse IF
Fremad Amager	1–2	Dragør BK
Helsingør IF	2–4 (a.e.t.)	AB
Herfølge BK	7–1	Nakskov BK
Hvidovre IF	7–2	Hellerup IK
Kolding IF	3–4 (a.e.t.)	Esbjerg fB
BK Marienlyst	4–3	FC Fredericia
Nørresundby BK	0–2	Horsens fS
Nørre Aaby IK	2–1	Svendborg fB
Nykøbing Mors IF	1–3	Herning Fremad
Randers Freja	4–2	Kolding BK
Roskilde BK	1–1 (a.e.t.) (3–4 p)	Kastrup BK
IK Skovbakken	1–3	B 1913
Spjald IF	0–2	Ikast FS
Ølstykke FC	5–0	Rosenhøj BK

== Fourth round ==
Team 1	Score	Team 2
AB	2–3	Brøndby IF
B 1909	3–1	Ikast FS
B 1913	4–3	Randers Freja
Dragør BK	1–2	Ølstykke FC
Esbjerg fB	3–6 (a.e.t.)	Næstved IF
Herfølge BK	1–2	BK Avarta
Hvidovre IF	4–3 (a.e.t.)	Herning Fremad
Kastrup BK	2–1	BK Marienlyst
Odense BK	6–0	Horsens fS
Vejle BK	5–0	Brønshøj BK
Viborg FF	3–3 (a.e.t.) (3–2 p)	Silkeborg IF
AaB	5–0	Nørre Aaby IK

== Fifth round ==
Team 1	Score	Team 2
Ølstykke FC	1–3	Næstved IF
BK Avarta	1–3	B 1913
B 1909	1–2	BK Frem
F.C. Copenhagen	2–0 (a.e.t.)	Brøndby IF
Hvidovre IF	0–0 (a.e.t.) (4–1 p)	AGF
Kastrup BK	3–4	Lyngby BK
Odense BK	3–2 (a.e.t.)	Vejle BK
Viborg FF	1–3	AaB

== Quarter-finals ==
Team 1	Score	Team 2
B 1913	0–2	AaB
Hvidovre IF	0–4	F.C. Copenhagen
Lyngby BK	0–4	Odense BK
Næstved IF	1–3 (a.e.t.)	BK Frem

== Semi-finals ==
Team 1	Agg.	Team 2	1st leg	2nd leg
F.C. Copenhagen	2–3	Odense BK	0–2	2–1
BK Frem	2–3	AaB	1–2	1–1

== Final ==
20 May 1993

Odense BK	2–0	AaB
Elstrup 29' (pen.); Hansen 86'	Report

Parken Stadium, Copenhagen
Attendance: 9,023
Referee: Finn Lambek
