= 1985–86 Danish Cup =

Tournament details
- Country: Denmark

Final positions
- Champions: B 1903
- Runners-up: Ikast FS

The 1985–86 Danish Cup was the 32nd season of the Danish Cup, the highest football competition in Denmark. The final was played on 8 May 1986.

== First round ==
Team 1	Score	Team 2
Assens FC	1–3	Horsens fS
B 1921	1–0	B 1901
Ballerup IF	4–1	KFUM Roskilde
IF Skjold Birkerød	2–0	Stenløse BK
Eskilstrup BK	3–2 (a.e.t.)	Sundby BK
Frederikshavn fI	0–0 (a.e.t.) (3–4 p)	Nørresundby BK
Fremad Amager	3–3 (a.e.t.) (3–2 p)	Humlebæk BK
Glostrup IC	3–0	Ringsted IF
Haderslev FK	2–4	Aabenraa BK
Hellas BK Valby	2–5 (a.e.t.)	IK Viking Rønne
Helsingør IF	4–1	Skovlunde Fodbold
Hjørring IF	1–2	AaB
Holstebro BK	1–1 (a.e.t.) (3–4 p)	IF Hasle Fuglebakken
Jyderup BK	3–1	Maribo BK
Marstal IF	0–1	Skagen IK
Middelfart G&BK	2–1	Thisted FC
Nakskov BK	1–2	Kalundborg GB
OKS	4–1	Odense KFUM
Roskilde BK	1–4	Greve IF
Skals FF	0–1	IF AIA-Tranbjerg
IK Skovbakken	4–0	Vejen SF
Slagelse B&I	1–0	BK Avarta
Svendborg fB	3–2	Varde IF
Tarup Paarup IF	0–1 (a.e.t.)	Viborg FF
Tistrup BK	1–1 (a.e.t.) (6–5 p)	Aalborg Chang
Tårnby BK	1–4	Holbæk B&I
Vipperød BK	1–2	BK Fremad Valby
Vordingborg IF	2–3	Vanløse IF

== Second round ==
Team 1	Score	Team 2
IF AIA-Tranbjerg	3–0	Aabenraa BK
B 1903	3–1	Greve IF
B 1909	2–3	Kolding IF
B 1913	3–1	AaB
B 1921	3–0	IF Skjold Birkerød
B.93	1–0	AB
Ballerup IF	1–2	Fremad Amager
Eskilstrup BK	1–5	Helsingør IF
BK Fremad Valby	0–1	Holbæk B&I
Glostrup IC	3–2	IK Viking Rønne
Horsens fS	0–2	Middelfart G&BK
KB	7–2	Kalundborg GB
Randers Freja	1–4	Herning Fremad
Silkeborg IF	2–1	Esbjerg fB
Skagen IK	2–3	Svendborg fB
IK Skovbakken	0–2	OKS
Slagelse B&I	1–2 (a.e.t.)	Kastrup BK
Tistrup BK	1–3	Nørresundby BK
Vanløse IF	2–3	Jyderup BK
Viborg FF	4–0	IF Hasle Fuglebakken

== Third round ==
Team 1	Score	Team 2
AGF	5–1	Næstved IF
B 1913	0–0 (a.e.t.) (4–3 p)	Køge BK
B 1921	0–0 (a.e.t.) (6–5 p)	Lyngby BK
B.93	4–1	BK Frem
Brøndby IF	3–1	Vejle BK
Brønshøj BK	2–1 (a.e.t.)	Silkeborg IF
Fremad Amager	4–1	Helsingør IF
Glostrup IC	1–2	Jyderup BK
Herfølge BK	0–2	Kolding IF
Herning Fremad	0–2	Svendborg fB
Holbæk B&I	5–4 (a.e.t.)	Kastrup BK
Ikast FS	2–0 (a.e.t.)	Hvidovre IF
KB	4–0	Nørresundby BK
Odense BK	6–0	IF AIA-Tranbjerg
OKS	0–3	B 1903
Viborg FF	2–0	Middelfart G&BK

== Fourth round ==
Team 1	Score	Team 2
AGF	3–1	Kolding IF
B 1903	1–1 (a.e.t.) (5–4 p)	B 1913
B.93	0–2	Viborg FF
Brøndby IF	8–2	B 1921
Brønshøj BK	2–2 (a.e.t.) (3–5 p)	Fremad Amager
Holbæk B&I	2–1	Svendborg fB
Ikast FS	5–1	Jyderup BK
KB	3–0	Odense BK

== Quarter-finals ==
Team 1	Score	Team 2
B 1903	1–1 (a.e.t.) (4–3 p)	Holbæk B&I
Brøndby IF	0–2	KB
Fremad Amager	6–3 (a.e.t.)	AGF
Ikast FS	2–1 (a.e.t.)	Viborg FF

== Semi-finals ==
Team 1	Agg.	Team 2	1st leg	2nd leg
B 1903	4–0	Fremad Amager	0–0	4–0
Ikast FS	4–2	KB	2–1	2–1

== Final ==
8 May 1986

B 1903	2–1	Ikast FS
Valentin 7'; Rasmussen 78'	Report	Kristensen 60'

Københavns Idrætspark, Copenhagen
Attendance: 5,600
Referee: Kurt Sørensen
