= 1983–84 Danish Cup =

Tournament details
- Country: Denmark

Final positions
- Champions: Lyngby BK
- Runners-up: KB

The 1983–84 Danish Cup was the 30th season of the Danish Cup, the highest football competition in Denmark. The final was played on 31 May 1984.

== First round ==
Team 1	Score	Team 2
IF AS Aarhus	0–1	Kolding BK
Assens FC	0–1 (a.e.t.)	Nørresundby BK
B 1908	0–1	Gladsaxe-Hero BK
B 1921	8–1	Maribo BK
Dragør BK	0–5	Fremad Amager
Greve IF	7–0	Espergærde IF
Grindsted G&IF	0–5	Viborg FF
Hjortshøj-Egå IF	1–1 (a.e.t.) (4–2 p)	Tåsinge fB
Herning KFUM	0–4	Holstebro BK
Hellerup IK	1–4	Kalundborg GB
Horsens fS	0–1	OKS
KFUM København	2–4	B 1938 Idestrup
Korsør BK	3–2	FIF Hillerød
Lindholm IF	2–1	Middelfart G&BK
Lundtofte BK	3–1	IF Skjold Birkerød
Nakskov BK	6–2	BK Fremad Valby
Roskilde KFUM	5–3	Gentofte-Vangede IF
Skamby BK	6–2	Jelling fS
Sankt Klemens Fangel IF	1–3	Randers Freja
Svendborg fB	3–2	IK Skovbakken
Ulbjerg IF	1–3	Tønder SF
SUB Ullerslev	3–4	Tarup Paarup IF
Vanløse IF	0–5	BK Avarta
IK Viking Rønne	0–1	Helsingør IF
Vordingborg IF	3–1 (a.e.t.)	Roskilde BK
AaB	5–0	Silkeborg IF
Aalborg Chang	2–3	Fredericia KFUM
Østerbros Boldklub	4–1	AIK Frederiksholm

== Second round ==
Team 1	Score	Team 2
B 1938 Idestrup	0–5	BK Frem
B 1901	3–1	Gladsaxe-Hero BK
Brønshøj BK	11–0	Østerbros Boldklub
Frederikshavn fI	2–3	Tarup Paarup IF
Fremad Amager	2–3 (a.e.t.)	KB
Glostrup IC	4–3	B 1921
Hjortshøj-Egå IF	0–2	Herning Fremad
Helsingør IF	3–1 (a.e.t.)	Vordingborg IF
Holstebro BK	2–4 (a.e.t.)	Svendborg fB
Ikast FS	4–1	Fredericia KFUM
Kalundborg GB	2–0	Tønder SF
Kastrup BK	5–0 (a.e.t.)	Greve IF
Kolding BK	3–4	AaB
Lindholm IF	1–0	Skamby BK
Lundtofte BK	1–4	BK Avarta
Nakskov BK	2–1	AB
Nørresundby BK	2–2 (a.e.t.) (5–4 p)	Korsør BK
OKS	1–3	Randers Freja
Roskilde KFUM	2–0 (a.e.t.)	Herfølge BK
Viborg FF	1–2	B 1909

== Third round ==
Team 1	Score	Team 2
B 1903	0–0 (a.e.t.) (4–3 p)	Brønshøj BK
B 1909	2–5 (a.e.t.)	BK Avarta
Esbjerg fB	3–2	Brøndby IF
BK Frem	2–1	Hvidovre IF
Glostrup IC	0–1	AGF
Helsingør IF	1–0	Korsør BK
Kalundborg GB	1–2 (a.e.t.)	Næstved IF
KB	3–1	Nakskov BK
Kolding IF	2–0	Herning Fremad
Køge BK	3–1	Lindholm IF
Lyngby BK	3–2	B.93
Odense BK	2–1	Randers Freja
Svendborg fB	6–3 (a.e.t.)	B 1901
Tarup Paarup IF	0–0 (a.e.t.) (6–5 p)	Ikast FS
Vejle BK	6–0	Roskilde KFUM
AaB	2–2 (a.e.t.) (4–3 p)	Kastrup BK

== Fourth round ==
Team 1	Score	Team 2
Esbjerg fB	1–0	Køge BK
BK Frem	1–0	B 1903
Helsingør IF	2–1 (a.e.t.)	BK Avarta
KB	3–2 (a.e.t.)	Næstved IF
Kolding IF	1–0	AaB
Lyngby BK	1–1 (a.e.t.) (4–2 p)	AGF
Svendborg fB	1–4	Vejle BK
Tarup Paarup IF	0–3	Odense BK

== Quarter-finals ==
Team 1	Score	Team 2
Esbjerg fB	0–4	Vejle BK
BK Frem	1–0	Helsingør IF
KB	3–2	Odense BK
Kolding IF	0–1	Lyngby BK

== Semi-finals ==
Team 1	Agg.	Team 2	1st leg	2nd leg
KB	4–4 (4–3 p)	BK Frem	2–2	2–2 (a.e.t.)
Lyngby BK	3–3 (a)	Vejle BK	1–1	2–2

== Final ==
31 May 1984

Lyngby BK	2–1	KB
Lyng 45'; Christensen 78'	Report	Pedersen 63'

Københavns Idrætspark, Copenhagen
Attendance: 25,800
Referee: Alex Jacobsen
