= 1989–90 Danish Cup =

Tournament details
- Country: Denmark

Final positions
- Champions: Lyngby BK
- Runners-up: AGF

The 1989–90 Danish Cup was the 36th season of the Danish Cup, the highest football competition in Denmark. The champion was decided on 31 May 1990 in a replay of the final, after the original final on 24 May concluded with a goalless draw.

== First round ==
Team 1	Score	Team 2
B.93	3–0	Dynamo Dragsholm
B 1901	12–2	Jægersborg BK
B 1909	7–0	Glamsbjerg IF
Bramming BK	1–1 (a.e.t.) (4–3 p)	Varde IF
Espergærde IF	2–0	Hvidovre IF
Fredericia KFUM	5–1	Esbjerg ØB
Frederikshavn fI	3–1	Grenaa IF
Fremad Amager	7–5 (a.e.t.)	Glostrup IC
BK Fremad Valby	1–0	Greve IF
Hellas BK Valby	1–1 (a.e.t.) (3–5 p)	SB50 Ishøj
Helsingør IF	4–1	Skovlunde Fodbold
Herlufsholm GF	3–5	Albertslund IF
Herning Fremad	2–3	Nørresundby BK
Hellerup IK	2–4 (a.e.t.)	Roskilde BK
Hobro IK	6–0	Nørre Broby BK
Holeby IF	1–3	Dragør BK
Holstebro BK	4–0	Korsør BK
Horsens fS	1–3	Aabenraa BK
Kastrup BK	2–1 (a.e.t.)	Humlebæk BK
KB	4–0	BK Avarta
Lumby Søhus IF	0–1	Hjørring AIK Frem
Nakskov BK	3–2	Hjørring IF
Nørre Aaby IK	3–2	Asaa BK
Odense KFUM	2–0	Brande IF
Randers Freja	3–0	Vejgaard BSK
Ringsted IF	0–0 (a.e.t.) (1–3 p)	AB
Rønne IK	1–2	BK Friheden
IK Skovbakken	3–2	Kolding IF
Skovshoved IF	2–1 (a.e.t.)	Slagelse B&I
Spjald IF	2–7	OKS
Stubbekøbing BK	0–1	Ølstykke FC
Tarup Paarup IF	0–1 (a.e.t.)	Svendborg fB
Tårnby BK	0–3	Holbæk B&I
SUB Ullerslev	3–0	Struer BK
Vanløse IF	2–4	IF Skjold Birkerød
Viborg FF	2–1	IF Hasle Fuglebakken
IK Viking Rønne	1–0	BK Rødovre
Aabyhøj IF	1–3	Kolding BK
Aalborg Freja	1–4	Esbjerg fB
ØB	3–7 (a.e.t.)	Køge BK

== Second round ==
Team 1	Score	Team 2
AB	3–1	Fremad Amager
B 1901	6–2	Albertslund IF
B 1913	2–0	Kolding IF
B.93	2–0	Køge BK
IF Skjold Birkerød	1–0	Kastrup BK
Brønshøj BK	4–0	Roskilde BK
Bramming BK	1–4	Randers Freja
Dragør BK	2–2 (a.e.t.) (3–4 p)	Helsingør IF
Espergærde IF	3–1	SB50 Ishøj
Fredericia KFUM	2–3	Odense KFUM
Frederikshavn fI	0–3	Esbjerg fB
BK Frem	6–0	BK Friheden
BK Fremad Valby	2–2 (a.e.t.) (2–3 p)	IK Viking Rønne
Herfølge BK	0–1	Ølstykke FC
Hobro IK	1–0	Hjørring AIK Frem
Nørre Aaby IK	1–2 (a.e.t.)	Holstebro BK
OKS	1–3	B 1909
IK Skovbakken	2–0	Nørresundby BK
Skovshoved IF	0–2	KB
Svendborg fB	2–0	SUB Ullerslev
Viborg FF	4–1	Holbæk B&I
Aabenraa BK	4–1	Nakskov BK

== Third round ==
Team 1	Score	Team 2
B 1903	2–3	Svendborg fB
Brøndby IF	10–3	Espergærde IF
Esbjerg fB	1–4	Randers Freja
Helsingør IF	0–0 (a.e.t.) (4–3 p)	AB
Holstebro BK	1–7	Lyngby BK
Ikast FS	0–1 (a.e.t.)	AGF
KB	5–1	B 1901
Næstved IF	3–1	B 1909
Odense BK	2–3 (a.e.t.)	IF Skjold Birkerød
Silkeborg IF	3–0	Hobro IK
IK Skovbakken	6–1	Odense KFUM
Vejle BK	3–0	Viborg FF
IK Viking Rønne	0–4	Brønshøj BK
AaB	3–1	B.93
Aabenraa BK	0–1	B 1913
Ølstykke FC	2–1 (a.e.t.)	BK Frem

== Fourth round ==
Team 1	Score	Team 2
IF Skjold Birkerød	0–2	Silkeborg IF
Brøndby IF	6–0	AaB
Helsingør IF	2–1 (a.e.t.)	Randers Freja
Næstved IF	1–2 (a.e.t.)	Lyngby BK
IK Skovbakken	0–4	AGF
Svendborg fB	1–0	Brønshøj BK
Vejle BK	4–0	B 1913
Ølstykke FC	2–1	KB

== Quarter-finals ==
Team 1	Score	Team 2
Helsingør IF	0–1	AGF
Lyngby BK	1–0	Brøndby IF
Silkeborg IF	1–2	Ølstykke FC
Svendborg fB	0–3	Vejle BK

== Semi-finals ==
Team 1	Agg.	Team 2	1st leg	2nd leg
AGF	2–0	Ølstykke FC	1–0	1–0
Vejle BK	1–5	Lyngby BK	1–2	0–3

== Final ==
=== Regulation Game ===
24 May 1990

Lyngby BK	0–0 (a.e.t.)	AGF
	Report

Københavns Idrætspark, Copenhagen
Attendance: 8,600
Referee: Kim Milton Nielsen

=== Replay ===
31 May 1990

Lyngby BK	6–1	AGF
Larsen 23'; Nielsen 40'; Clem 61'; F. Christensen 64', 86'; Schäfer 78'	Report	T. Christensen 71'

Københavns Idrætspark, Copenhagen
Attendance: 2,000
Referee: Jan Damgaard
