= 1984–85 Danish Cup =

Tournament details
- Country: Denmark

Final positions
- Champions: Lyngby BK
- Runners-up: Esbjerg fB

The 1984–85 Danish Cup was the 31st season of the Danish Cup, the highest football competition in Denmark. The final was played on 16 May 1985.

== First round ==
Team 1	Score	Team 2
Jyderup BK	2–0	B 1901
Ringsted IF	3–1	Gentofte-Vangede IF
Glostrup IC	2–4 (a.e.t.)	Hellerup IK
Gørlev IF	2–4	Tingsted BK
Vordingborg IF	3–1	Greve IF
Vanløse IF	3–0	Helsingør IF
Holbæk B&I	2–0	Rødby fB
Kettinge Boldklub	2–4	AaB
Aabenraa BK	0–2	B 1913
Assens FC	5–1	Aalborg Freja
Tistrup BK	3–2	Holstebro BK
Aalborg Chang	1–2	Horsens fS
Nørresundby BK	3–0	Randers Freja
Svendborg fB	1–1 (a.e.t.) (3–4 p)	Nørre Aaby IK
Tulstrup/Faurholt IK	5–2	Strib IF
Varde IF	0–2	Ulbjerg IF
Herlev IF	1–0	B 1908 Amager
SUB Ullerslev	0–4	B 1921
BK Avarta	2–0	Skovlunde Fodbold
KFUM København	1–0	Gladsaxe-Hero BK
IF Skjold Birkerød	0–2	Skovshoved IF
IK Viking Rønne	1–3	Slagelse B&I
Rosenhøj BK	0–4	Nakskov BK
IF Hasle Fuglebakken	1–4	Frederikshavn fI
Silkeborg IF	3–0	Hjørring IF
Hørning GF	1–2	IK Skovbakken
Viborg FF	3–1 (a.e.t.)	Lindholm IF
Næsby BK	3–0 (a.e.t.)	Sankt Klemens Fangel IF

== Second round ==
Team 1	Score	Team 2
B.93	2–1 (a.e.t.)	Herlev IF
Kastrup IF	3–1	Nakskov BK
Nørresundby BK	3–0	Herning Fremad
BK Avarta	2–4	AB
B 1903	2–2 (a.e.t.) (5–4 p)	KB
Jyderup BK	1–1 (a.e.t.) (3–2 p)	Fremad Amager
Holbæk B&I	5–1	KFUM København
Tingsted BK	2–0	Ringsted IF
Skovshoved IF	3–4 (a.e.t.)	Vordingborg IF
Roskilde BK	1–3	AaB
Assens FC	2–6	Kolding IF
Herfølge BK	2–1	B 1909
B 1913	2–5	Silkeborg IF
Viborg FF	3–0	Frederikshavn fI
OKS	2–0	IK Skovbakken
Næsby BK	1–1 (a.e.t.) (1–4 p)	Ulbjerg IF
Tulstrup/Faurholt IK	1–2 (a.e.t.)	Tistrup BK
B 1921	4–2	Vanløse IF
Slagelse B&I	1–4	Hellerup IK
Nørre Aaby IK	0–2	Horsens fS

== Third round ==
Team 1	Score	Team 2
Horsens fS	1–6	AGF
Kolding IF	4–2 (a.e.t.)	B 1921
B.93	2–3	Hvidovre IF
BK Frem	2–1	Brønshøj BK
Holbæk B&I	2–1	Brøndby IF
Vejle BK	8–1	Jyderup BK
Lyngby BK	2–0	Køge BK
Viborg FF	2–1	Næstved IF
Nørresundby BK	7–0	Tingsted BK
Odense BK	5–2	Vordingborg IF
OKS	2–4	AaB
Ikast FS	3–6	Silkeborg IF
Ulbjerg IF	1–0	AB
Tistrup BK	1–2	Kastrup IF
Herfølge BK	1–2	B 1903
Esbjerg fB	2–1	Hellerup IK

== Fourth round ==
Team 1	Score	Team 2
Kastrup BK	1–0	Nørresundby BK
AaB	4–2	Holbæk B&I
Odense BK	0–2	B 1903
BK Frem	6–0	Ulbjerg IF
Hvidovre IF	0–2	Kolding IF
Lyngby BK	3–1	Vejle BK
Viborg FF	1–0	AGF
Esbjerg fB	2–1	Silkeborg IF

== Quarter-finals ==
Team 1	Score	Team 2
AaB	1–0 (a.e.t.)	Kastrup IF
B 1903	1–1 (a.e.t.) (3–4 p)	Esbjerg fB
Viborg FF	1–0	BK Frem
Kolding IF	0–1	Lyngby BK

== Semi-finals ==
Team 1	Agg.	Team 2	1st leg	2nd leg
Lyngby BK	6–1	AaB	3–0	3–1
Viborg FF	2–2 (a)	Esbjerg fB	2–1	0–1

== Final ==
16 May 1985

Lyngby BK	3–2	Esbjerg fB
Spangsborg 50'; Christensen 66', 87'	Report	Mogensen 45'; Kristiansen 55'

Københavns Idrætspark, Copenhagen
Attendance: 9,200
Referee: Jan Damgaard
