= 1998–99 Danish Cup =

Tournament details
- Country: Denmark

Final positions
- Champions: Akademisk Boldklub
- Runners-up: AaB Fodbold

The 1998–99 Danish Cup was the 45th season of the Danish Cup, the highest football competition in Denmark. The final was played on 13 May 1999.

== First round ==
Team 1	Score	Team 2
Vojens BK	2–0	Fjordager IF
Kalundborg GB	2–3	Nivå-Kokkedal Fodbold
Thisted FC	1–0	Holstebro BK
BK Avarta	3–0	Brønshøj BK
B 1908	0–2	Hellerup IK
Dalum IF	4–1	B 1909
Dynamo Dragsholm	0–3	Nykøbing FA
Dronninglund IF	1–4	OKS
Faxe BK	1–3	IK Viking Rønne
Farsø/Ullits IK	0–3	Vorup Frederiksberg BK
Frederikshavn fI	3–2	Skive IK
ÍF Føroyar	0–3	Kastrup BK
Gladsaxe-Hero BK	3–4	Vanløse IF
Hedehusene IK	3–1	Døllefjelde-Musse IF
Holbæk B&I	3–0*	Skovshoved IF
Hundested IK	5–2	IF Skjold Birkerød
Kerteminde BK	0–3	Greve IF
Kolding IF	1–4	Vejen SF
Maribo BK	0–4	Jægersborg BK
Nakskov BK	3–2	Farum BK
Ringkøbing IF	1–2	Brande IF
SHN/Ulfborg IF	0–1	Middelfart G&BK
Skals FF	0–3	Haderslev FK
Snejbjerg SG&I	6–5	Nørre Aaby IK
Stensballe IF	4–2	Lystrup IF
Vedbæk BK	7–0	Helsingør IF
Vejgaard BSK	1–4	Randers Freja
Vejle FC	0–2	Kolding BK
BK Vest Rødovre	2–3	Tårnby BK
Viby IF	4–1	Krogsbølle-Roerslev FK
VLI Frederiksberg IF	1–2	Ringsted IF
Aars IK	1–6	FC Fredericia

*The match between Holbæk B&I and Skovshoved IF (2–3) was scored 3–0 for Holbæk due to the use of two Skovshoved players who were not eligible to play.

== Second round ==
Team 1	Score	Team 2
IK Viking Rønne	2–1	Fremad Amager
Vojens BK	0–3	Nykøbing FA
BK Avarta	0–3	Hellerup IK
Brande IF	4–4 (a.e.t.) (4–5 p)	Aalborg Chang
Frederikshavn fI	6–1	Nakskov BK
Greve IF	1–1 (a.e.t.) (5–4 p)	Holbæk B&I
Hedehusene IK	0–4	Skovshoved IF
Hundested IK	0–6	Næstved BK
Jægersborg BK	4–1	Kastrup BK
Kolding BK	0–3	Vorup Frederiksberg BK
Nivå-Kokkedal Fodbold	1–3	BK Frem
OKS	1–0	Dalum IF
Randers Freja	2–3	Haderslev FK
Ringsted IF	4–2 (a.e.t.)	Vanløse IF
Snejbjerg SG&I	2–0	Stensballe IF
Thisted FC	4–3	FC Fredericia
Vedbæk BK	0–2	Glostrup IF 32
Vejen SF	2–3	B 1913
Viby IF	1–3 (a.e.t.)	Middelfart G&BK
Ølstykke FC	0–2	Tårnby BK

== Third round ==
Team 1	Score	Team 2
Jægersborg BK	1–3	BK Frem
Roskilde BK	0–3	Hellerup IK
Greve IF	1–2	Ringsted IF
Køge BK	3–1	Hvidovre IF
Nykøbing FA	0–3	Tårnby BK
Næstved BK	3–1	Glostrup IF 32
OKS	1–7	Haderslev FK
IK Viking Rønne	2–9	B 1913
Thisted FC	2–3	Herning Fremad
Vorup Frederiksberg BK	1–3	Svendborg fB
Aalborg Chang	0–2	Odense BK
Ikast FS	2–3 (a.e.t.)	Esbjerg fB
Snejbjerg SG&I	0–7	AC Horsens
Middelfart G&BK	2–3	Frederikshavn fI

== Fourth round ==
Team 1	Score	Team 2
Haderslev FK	0–4	Viborg FF
AC Horsens	4–5	AaB
B 1913	0–1	Odense BK
Frederikshavn fI	0–2	Herfølge BK
BK Frem	0–2	Aarhus Fremad
Herning Fremad	5–0	Køge BK
Ringsted IF	2–4 (a.e.t.)	Næstved BK
Tårnby BK	1–3	Esbjerg fB
Hellerup IK	0–7	AGF
Svendborg fB	3–2	B.93

== Fifth round ==
Team 1	Score	Team 2
Esbjerg fB	1–3	AaB
Herning Fremad	1–2	Herfølge BK
Næstved BK	1–7	AB
Svendborg fB	0–3	F.C. Copenhagen
Silkeborg IF	5–1	Aarhus Fremad
Lyngby BK	1–0	Vejle BK
Odense BK	1–0	AGF
Viborg FF	0–3	Brøndby IF

== Quarter-finals ==
Team 1	Score	Team 2
AB	1–0	F.C. Copenhagen
Silkeborg IF	2–1	Herfølge BK
Lyngby BK	1–1 (a.e.t.) (2–4 p)	AaB
Odense BK	1–3 (a.e.t.)	Brøndby IF

== Semi-finals ==
Team 1	Agg.	Team 2	1st leg	2nd leg
Brøndby IF	1–3	AB	1–1	0–2
Silkeborg IF	4–6	AaB	4–4	0–2

== Final ==
13 May 1999

AB	2–1	AaB
Nielsen 42'; Hermansen 73'	Report	Frederiksen 59'

Parken Stadium, Copenhagen
Attendance: 25,113
Referee: Jan Hald
