= 1991–92 Danish Cup =

Tournament details
- Country: Denmark

Final positions
- Champions: AGF
- Runners-up: B 1903

The 1991–92 Danish Cup was the 38th season of the Danish Cup, the highest football competition in Denmark. The final was played on 28 May 1992.

== First round ==
Team 1	Score	Team 2
AB	3–2	Hjortshøj-Egå IF
BK Avarta	0–2	Ballerup IF
B.93	2–1	Ryvang FC
Dalum IF	4–4 (a.e.t.) (5–4 p)	Vildbjerg SF
Frederikssund IK	2–2 (a.e.t.) (5–3 p)	Hjørring IF
Gundersted IF	0–7	IK Skovbakken
Herlufsholm GF	1–1 (a.e.t.) (3–4 p)	IF Skjold Birkerød
FIF Hillerød	1–2	BK Fremad Valby
Hørsholm-Usserød IK	5–1	Holstebro BK
Kalundborg GB	4–0	Fjordager IF
Kastrup BK	1–2	Sønderborg BK
Køge BK	3–2	Greve IF
Nørre Aaby IK	3–1	Horsens fS
OKS	2–5 (a.e.t.)	Dragør BK
Ringsted IF	1–0	Tved BK
Roskilde BK	4–2	Grimstrup IF
Skovshoved IF	3–2	Vordingborg IF
Slagelse B&I	2–0	Aalborg Freja
Varde IF	0–1	Esbjerg fB
Aabyhøj IF	4–0	Sankt Klemens Fangel IF

== Second round ==
Team 1	Score	Team 2
AB	1–0	Svendborg fB
B.93	2–1	Vanløse IF
IF Skjold Birkerød	3–2	Frederikssund IK
Brønshøj BK	3–2 (a.e.t.)	Esbjerg fB
Dalum IF	1–3	Nørre Aaby IK
Fremad Amager	3–0	KB
BK Fremad Valby	1–2	Hellerup IK
Helsingør IF	3–1	Hørsholm-Usserød IK
Herfølge BK	0–1	Randers Freja
Køge BK	4–2	Ballerup IF
Roskilde BK	3–2	Nørresundby BK
IK Skovbakken	1–1 (a.e.t.) (3–1 p)	B 1913
Skovshoved IF	4–3	Kalundborg GB
Sønderborg BK	1–1 (a.e.t.) (4–1 p)	Ringsted IF
Viborg FF	4–0	Dragør BK
Aabyhøj IF	0–0 (a.e.t.) (0–2 p)	Slagelse B&I

== Third round ==
Team 1	Score	Team 2
B 1909	6–2	Roskilde BK
B.93	2–1	IF Skjold Birkerød
Fremad Amager	1–4	Skovshoved IF
Hellerup IK	0–2	Viborg FF
Ikast FS	5–1	AB
Nørre Aaby IK	0–1 (a.e.t.)	Slagelse B&I
Næstved IF	2–0	Køge BK
Odense BK	4–2	Silkeborg IF
Randers Freja	2–2 (a.e.t.) (2–4 p)	Helsingør IF
IK Skovbakken	0–1	AaB
Sønderborg BK	0–9	B 1903
Vejle BK	3–0	Brønshøj BK

== Fourth round ==
Team 1	Score	Team 2
AGF	5–2	Ikast FS
B 1909	1–1 (a.e.t.) (4–1 p)	Brøndby IF
BK Frem	2–4	Lyngby BK
Helsingør IF	4–3 (a.e.t.)	B.93
Odense BK	3–2	Vejle BK
Skovshoved IF	1–4	Næstved IF
Viborg FF	1–3	B 1903
AaB	3–0	Slagelse B&I

== Quarter-finals ==
Team 1	Score	Team 2
AGF	4–1	AaB
B 1909	2–1	Næstved IF
Helsingør IF	0–3	Lyngby BK
Odense BK	0–2	B 1903

== Semi-finals ==
Team 1	Agg.	Team 2	1st leg	2nd leg
AGF	2–1	B 1909	1–0	1–1
Lyngby BK	1–2	B 1903	1–1	0–1

== Final ==
28 May 1992

AGF	3–0	B 1903
Haarder 9'; Andersen 35'; Sørensen 87'	Report

Aarhus Idrætspark, Aarhus
Attendance: 20,000
Referee: Kaj Østergaard
