= 1986–87 Danish Cup =

Tournament details
- Country: Denmark

Final positions
- Champions: AGF
- Runners-up: AaB

The 1986–87 Danish Cup was the 33rd season of the Danish Cup, the highest football competition in Denmark. The final was played on 28 May 1987.

== First round ==
Team 1	Score	Team 2
AB	1–1 (a.e.t.) (4–5 p)	Helsingør IF
Assens FC	4–0	Farsø/Ullits IK
B 1901	4–2	B 1908
B 1909	9–0	Krarup Espe SG&I
B 1913	4–0	Glamsbjerg IF
IF Skjold Birkerød	2–1	Glostrup IC
Dalum IF	5–1	Thisted FC
Dragør BK	2–1	B.93
Dronningborg IF	5–3	Odense KFUM
Gladsaxe-Hero BK	4–1	Frem Sakskøbing
Greve IF	3–0	Humlebæk BK
Gentofte-Vangede IF	1–3	Ballerup IF
Hellas BK Valby	4–1	Espergærde IF
Herlufsholm GF	0–1	Haslev IF
Herning Fremad	0–3	OKS
Hjørring IF	4–5 (a.e.t.)	Fredericia KFUM
Holstebro BK	4–2	Roslev IK
Horsens fS	0–0 (a.e.t.) (3–5 p)	Varde IF
Hvidovre IF	3–0 (a.e.t.)	BK Fremad Valby
Jyderup BK	3–1	IK Viking Rønne
Karlslunde IF	0–6	B 1921
Kolding IF	1–2 (a.e.t.)	Silkeborg IF
Kværndrup BK	0–1	AaB
Køge BK	8–3	Rønne IK
Mørkøv IF	4–1	BK Avarta
Nørresundby BK	7–0	Vivild IF
Nyborg G&IF	4–2 (a.e.t.)	Vorup Frederiksberg BK
Næsby BK	0–1	Svendborg fB
BV Oksbøl	2–1	Kolding BK
Rødby fB	2–1	BK Frem
Skagen IK	3–2	Harlev IK
Skovshoved IF	1–1 (a.e.t.) (4–1 p)	Roskilde BK
Tingsted BK	0–7	Holbæk B&I
Tårnby BK	3–4	Fremad Amager
Vanløse IF	4–1	Skovlunde Fodbold
Vejgaard BSK	1–2	IK Skovbakken
Viborg FF	0–2	Sædding/Guldager IF
Vordingborg IF	1–4	Albertslund IF
Aabenraa BK	1–0	Slagelse B&I
Aalborg Chang	4–0	Frederikshavn fI

== Second round ==
Team 1	Score	Team 2
Albertslund IF	3–2	Ballerup IF
Assens FC	0–2	Næstved IF
B 1909	3–3 (a.e.t.) (3–4 p)	Vanløse IF
B 1921	1–2	Brønshøj BK
Dalum IF	0–2	Hellas BK Valby
Dragør BK	4–3 (a.e.t.)	Nyborg G&IF
Dronningborg IF	2–3	Varde IF
Fredericia KFUM	0–3	Ikast FS
Gladsaxe-Hero BK	0–5	Helsingør IF
Greve IF	0–4	OKS
Holstebro BK	1–2 (a.e.t.)	Skovshoved IF
Hvidovre IF	3–0	Rødby fB
Mørkøv IF	3–1	IF Skjold Birkerød
BV Oksbøl	1–7	B 1913
Randers Freja	4–3	Køge BK
Silkeborg IF	0–1	B 1901
Skagen IK	2–1	Jyderup BK
IK Skovbakken	5–1	Holbæk B&I
Svendborg fB	1–4	Nørresundby BK
Sædding/Guldager IF	2–2 (a.e.t.) (5–4 p)	Aalborg Chang
AaB	9–0	Haslev IF
Aabenraa BK	1–3	Fremad Amager

== Third round ==
Team 1	Score	Team 2
AGF	3–0	Esbjerg fB
Albertslund IF	0–5	Brønshøj BK
B 1903	0–0 (a.e.t.) (3–4 p)	Skagen IK
Dragør BK	3–0	Skovshoved IF
Hellas BK Valby	0–2	Ikast FS
Hvidovre IF	2–2 (a.e.t.) (5–6 p)	Herfølge BK
Kastrup BK	2–0	Fremad Amager
KB	0–1	Nørresundby BK
Lyngby BK	4–1	Helsingør IF
Odense BK	4–0	Mørkøv IF
IK Skovbakken	2–2 (a.e.t.) (3–5 p)	B 1913
Vanløse IF	2–0	Randers Freja
Varde IF	0–0 (a.e.t.) (5–4 p)	Næstved IF
Vejle BK	1–3 (a.e.t.)	Brøndby IF
AaB	1–0	OKS
Aalborg Chang	2–1	B 1901

== Fourth round ==
Team 1	Score	Team 2
B 1913	1–2 (a.e.t.)	Odense BK
Brøndby IF	2–2 (a.e.t.) (4–5 p)	Skagen IK
Dragør BK	0–4	AGF
Kastrup BK	1–2 (a.e.t.)	AaB
Nørresundby BK	3–2	Ikast FS
Vanløse IF	0–1	Brønshøj BK
Varde IF	0–2	Herfølge BK
Aalborg Chang	0–2	Lyngby BK

== Quarter-finals ==
Team 1	Score	Team 2
AGF	5–1	Odense BK
Nørresundby BK	0–2 (a.e.t.)	Lyngby BK
Skagen IK	0–4	Herfølge BK
AaB	6–0	Brønshøj BK

== Seni-finals ==
Team 1	Agg.	Team 2	1st leg	2nd leg
AGF	2–1	Lyngby BK	1–1	1–0
AaB	3–1	Herfølge BK	2–0	1–1

== Final ==
28 May 1987

AGF	3–0	AaB
Bartram 40' (pen.); Lauridsen 59'; Christensen 75'	Report

Københavns Idrætspark, Copenhagen
Attendance: 6,300
Referee: Kurt Horsted
