= Bjørn Kristensen (footballer, born 1963) =

Danish footballer (born 1963)

Personal information
- Full name: Bjørn Kristensen
- Date of birth: 10 October 1963 (age 63)
- Place of birth: Malling, Denmark
- Positions: Defender; midfielder

Senior career*
Years	Team	Apps	(Gls)
1982–1989	AGF	165	(19)
1989–1993	Newcastle United	80	(4)
1992	→ Bristol City	4	(0)
1993–1995	Portsmouth	71	(1)
1995–1997	AaB		
1997	Aarhus Fremad		

International career
1983–1986	Denmark U-21	12	(0)
1987–1993	Denmark	20	(2)
- * Club domestic league appearances and goals

Bjørn Kristensen (born 10 October 1963) is a Danish former professional footballer and Venstre politician in Aarhus Municipality.

During his active playing career, he most notably played for Danish club AGF and English club Newcastle United. Kristensen also made 20 appearances in which he scored two goals for the Denmark national team, and represented his country at the 1988 European Championship.

== Club career ==
Born in Malling, Kristensen started his career with local top-flight team AGF in 1982. His talent was soon discovered, as he played 12 matches for the Danish under-21 national team from 1983 to 1986. While at AGF, Kristensen won the 1986 Danish championship as well as two Danish Cup trophies.

Kristensen joined Newcastle United in March 1989, as a 25-year old, and became a popular figure amongst the fans for his versatility; he could play as a defender or midfielder. He is also remembered by Newcastle fans for having a powerful long-range shot. He was the second Newcastle player to gain caps for the Danish national team after Preben Arentoft, playing two national team matches in 1991. Kristensen was loaned out to Bristol City in November 1992, before permanently leaving Newcastle in February 1993. He moved to Portsmouth before returning to Denmark.

Kristensen joined defending Danish champions AaB in summer 1995. He made fine displays in the central defense of AaB, and took part in club's campaign in the international 1995–96 UEFA Champions League tournament. Despite being an experienced player in a young squad, Kristensen suffered a number of injuries and only played a total of 22 games for AaB. He moved to Aarhus Fremad in January 1997, and helped the club reach promotion to the Danish Superliga before retiring in January 1998.

== International career ==
Kristensen made his national team debut in May 1987, and took part in a single match at the 1988 European Championship. He made 20 total appearances for Denmark, scoring two goals.

== Honours ==
AGF

- Danish Football Championship: 1986
- Danish Cup: 1986–87, 1987–88

Aarhus Fremad

- Second Highest Danish League runner-up: 1996–97
