= 1995–96 Danish Cup =

Tournament details
- Country: Denmark

Final positions
- Champions: AGF
- Runners-up: Brøndby IF

The 1995–96 Danish Cup was the 42nd season of the Danish Cup, the highest football competition in Denmark. The final was played on 16 May 1996.

== First round ==
Team 1	Score	Team 2
Assens FC	4–1	Nibe BK
B 1908	3–0	Slagelse B&I
BK Dalgas	3–8	Måløv BK
Dalum IF	5–1	Krogsbølle-Roerslev FK
Frederiksberg BK	1–2	Skælskør B&I
Frederikssund IK	5–2	AB 70
Gladsaxe-Hero BK	5–2	Tarup Paarup IF
Hammerum IF	0–1	Aarhus Fremad
Hasle BK	2–3	Nykøbing FA
Herning KFUM	1–3	Thisted FC
Hjørring IF	2–1	Egebjerg IF
Højvangen IK	1–4	IK Skovbakken
Jernløse BK	4–6	Rødby fB
Kløvermarkens fB	2–1	Valby BK
Lundtofte BK	1–4	Roskilde BK
Nakskov BK	2–4	Holbæk B&I
Nykøbing Mors IF	3–4	IF Lyseng
Rønnede IF	1–2	BK Frem
Stenløse BK	7–6	Herlev IF
Sædding/Guldager IF	1–2	Esbjerg IF 92
Tved BK	6–0	Bramming BK
Taars-Ugilt IF	0–1	Vejen SF
Aalborg Chang	0–1	Kolding IF
Aars IK	2–3	Næsby BK

== Second round ==
Team 1	Score	Team 2
B 1908	2–1	IF Skjold Birkerød
B 1909	3–2	Thisted FC
B 1913	5–1	Kolding IF
Dalum IF	2–5	Aarhus Fremad
Esbjerg IF 92	3–4	IF Lyseng
FC Fredericia	2–0	Næsby BK
Frederikssund IK	3–2	Måløv BK
Gladsaxe-Hero BK	1–4	BK Frem
Haderslev FK	9–4 (a.e.t.)	IK Skovbakken
Hellerup IK	2–0	Dragør BK
Hjørring IF	0–3	Randers Freja
Holbæk B&I	2–3	Nykøbing FA
Glostrup IF 32	2–1	BK Avarta
Kløvermarkens fB	1:4	Skælskør B&I
Nørresundby BK	2–4 (a.e.t.)	Skive IK
Rødby fB	2–3	Kastrup BK
Skovshoved IF	3–0	Roskilde BK
Stenløse BK	1–2	Helsingør IF
Tved BK	2–3	Assens FC
Vejen SF	1–2	Nørre Aaby IK

== Third round ==
Team 1	Score	Team 2
Assens FC	0–1	Esbjerg fB
B.93	2–4	Helsingør IF
FC Fredericia	4–3 (a.e.t.)	IF Lyseng
Fremad Amager	5–0	Kastrup BK
Haderslev FK	1–3	Randers Freja
Hellerup IK	3–2 (a.e.t.)	Glostrup IF 32
Holstebro BK	1–1 (a.e.t.) (2–4 p)	B 1913
Hvidovre IF	1–1 (a.e.t.) (4–5 p)	AB
Køge BK	2–1	Brønshøj BK
Nykøbing FA	2–0 (a.e.t.)	BK Frem
Nørre Aaby IK	3–1	B 1909
Skive IK	4–2	Aarhus Fremad
Skovshoved IF	5–0	Frederikssund IK
Skælskør B&I	0–2	Herning Fremad
Svendborg fB	1–2	AC Horsens
Ølstykke FC	5–2	B 1908

== Fourth round ==
Team 1	Score	Team 2
AC Horsens	1–3	Skive IK
Esbjerg fB	5–0	Nørre Aaby IK
FC Fredericia	1–3	Viborg FF
Fremad Amager	2–3	Herfølge BK
Herning Fremad	2–3	B 1913
Hellerup IK	0–1	AB
Ikast FS	1–4	Vejle BK
Køge BK	2–0	Helsingør IF
Nykøbing FA	1–2	F.C. Copenhagen
Odense BK	1–0	Randers Freja
Skovshoved IF	1–7	Lyngby BK
Ølstykke FC	1–1 (a.e.t.) (4–3 p)	Næstved IF

== Fifth round ==
Team 1	Score	Team 2
B 1913	1–4	Herfølge BK
Brøndby IF	2–1	AB
Esbjerg fB	5–0	Køge BK
F.C. Copenhagen	0–2	AGF
Silkeborg IF	4–2	Lyngby BK
Viborg FF	2–1	Skive IK
AaB	4–0	Vejle BK
Ølstykke FC	2–2 (a.e.t.) (3–4 p)	Odense BK

== Quarter-finals ==
Team 1	Score	Team 2
Esbjerg fB	2–3	Herfølge BK
Silkeborg IF	1–2	AGF
Viborg FF	2–2 (a.e.t.) (2–4 p)	Odense BK
AaB	1–4	Brøndby IF

== Semi-finals ==
Team 1	Agg.	Team 2	1st leg	2nd leg
Brøndby IF	2–1	Odense BK	1–0	1–1
Herfølge BK	3–3 (a)	AGF	2–2	1–1

== Final ==
16 May 1996

AGF	2–0	Brøndby IF
Degn 32'; Tøfting 45'	Report

Parken Stadium, Copenhagen
Attendance: 36,103
Referee: Jørn West Larsen
