= 1943–44 Danish War Tournament =

Danish War Tournament
- Season: 1943–44
- Champions: Boldklubben Frem

The 1943–44 Danish War Tournament.

Boldklubben Frem pursued its 1943-44 Danish War Tournament title defeating Akademisk Boldklub, 4-2.

Statistics of Danish War Tournament in the 1943/1944 season.

== Series 1 ==
Pos	Team	Pld	W	D	L	GF	GA	GD	Pts
1	Aarhus Gymnastikforening	18	13	2	3	50	27	+23	28
2	Boldklubben 1909	18	11	3	4	53	31	+22	25
3	Odense Boldklub	18	10	1	7	71	55	+16	21
4	Randers Sportsklub Freja	18	7	5	6	45	41	+4	19
5	Aalborg Boldspilklub	18	7	3	8	35	36	−1	17
6	Vejen SF	18	4	8	6	34	45	−11	16
7	Boldklubben 1913	18	6	2	10	28	43	−15	14
8	Vejle Boldklub	18	5	4	9	37	60	−23	14
9	Esbjerg fB	18	5	3	10	36	38	−2	13
10	Aalborg Chang	18	6	1	11	31	44	−13	13

== Series 2 ==
Pos	Team	Pld	W	D	L	GF	GA	GD	Pts
1	KFUM	18	16	2	0	61	12	+49	34
2	Slagelse B&I	18	10	4	4	47	38	+9	24
3	Helsingør IF	18	9	5	4	45	32	+13	23
4	Haslev	18	10	0	8	53	45	+8	20
5	Nakskov	18	7	3	8	31	44	−13	17
6	B 1901	18	7	1	10	40	45	−5	15
7	Hellerup IK	18	5	4	9	33	28	+5	14
8	Korsør Boldklub	18	7	0	11	35	50	−15	14
9	Dragør Boldklub	18	5	1	12	33	55	−22	11
10	Boldklubben 1908	18	2	4	12	21	50	−29	8

== Series 3 ==
Pos	Team	Pld	W	D	L	GF	GA	GD	Pts
1	Akademisk Boldklub	14	10	2	2	44	28	+16	22
2	Kjøbenhavns Boldklub	14	9	2	3	30	18	+12	20
3	Boldklubben af 1893	14	6	4	4	32	20	+12	16
4	Boldklubben Frem	14	7	2	5	33	23	+10	16
5	Fremad Amager	14	7	1	6	37	39	−2	15
6	Østerbros Boldklub	14	4	1	9	22	38	−16	9
7	Køge BK	14	3	2	9	26	42	−16	8
8	Boldklubben 1903	14	2	2	10	19	35	−16	6

== Quarterfinals ==
- Boldklubben Frem 11-1 Slagelse B&I
- Boldklubben 1909 3-1 Kjøbenhavns Boldklub
- Aarhus Gymnastikforening 1-2 Boldklubben af 1893
- Akademisk Boldklub 1-1 KFUM
  - Akademisk Boldklub was awarded winner by lot.

== Semifinals ==
- Boldklubben af 1893 0-5 Akademisk Boldklub
- Boldklubben Frem 5-0 Boldklubben 1909

== Final ==
- Boldklubben Frem 4-2 Akademisk Boldklub
