= 1944–45 Danish War Tournament =

Danish War Tournament
- Season: 1944–45
- Champions: Akademisk Boldklub

The 1944–45 Danish War Tournament.

Boldklubben Frem unsuccessfully defended its 1944 title. Akademisk Boldklub successfully defended its pursuit of the 1945 title defeating Aarhus Gymnastikforening, 3-2.

Statistics of Danish War Tournament in the 1944/1945 season.

== Series 1, Phase 1, Group 1 ==
Pos	Team	Pld	W	D	L	GF	GA	GD	Pts
1	Randers Sportsklub Freja	6	4	1	1	15	10	+5	9
2	Aarhus Gymnastikforening	6	4	0	2	19	12	+7	8
3	Aalborg Boldspilklub	6	1	2	3	8	14	−6	4
4	Aalborg Chang	6	1	1	4	11	17	−6	3

== Series 1, Phase 1, Group 2 ==
Pos	Team	Pld	W	D	L	GF	GA	GD	Pts
1	Esbjerg fB	4	4	0	0	17	3	+14	8
2	Vejen SF	4	1	1	2	5	10	−5	3
3	Vejle Boldklub	4	0	1	3	4	13	−9	1

== Series 1, Phase 1, Group 3 ==
Pos	Team	Pld	W	D	L	GF	GA	GD	Pts
1	Boldklubben 1913	4	2	0	2	14	8	+6	4
2	Boldklubben 1909	4	2	0	2	6	7	−1	4
3	Odense Boldklub	4	2	0	2	9	14	−5	4

== Series 1, Phase 2 ==
- Boldklubben 1913 1-1 Esbjerg fB
- Esbjerg fB 2-2 Boldklubben 1913
  - Esbjerg fB was awarded winner because of better points-average than B 1913.
- Vejen SF 1-1 Boldklubben 1909
- Boldklubben 1909 6-1 Vejen SF

== Series 1, Phase 3 ==
- Aarhus Gymnastikforening 4-3 Boldklubben 1909
- Boldklubben 1909 4-1 Aarhus Gymnastikforening
  - Aarhus Gymnastikforening was awarded winner because of better points-average than B 1909.
- Esbjerg fB 1-2 Randers Sportsklub Freja
- Randers Sportsklub Freja 5-0 Esbjerg fB

== Series 2 ==
Pos	Team	Pld	W	D	L	GF	GA	GD	Pts
1	Hellerup IK	18	13	1	4	52	29	+23	27
2	Helsingør IF	18	11	3	4	62	28	+34	25
3	Næstved IF	18	10	5	3	58	36	+22	25
4	Slagelse B&I	18	10	4	4	70	45	+25	24
5	B 1901	18	10	2	6	42	37	+5	22
6	Dragør Boldklub	18	5	5	8	40	55	−15	15
7	Brønshøj BK	18	7	0	11	43	51	−8	14
8	Nakskov	18	5	0	13	44	64	−20	10
9	Korsør Boldklub	18	4	2	12	30	64	−34	10
10	Haslev	18	3	2	13	28	60	−32	8

== Series 3 ==
Pos	Team	Pld	W	D	L	GF	GA	GD	Pts
1	Akademisk Boldklub	16	9	3	4	42	26	+16	21
2	Kjøbenhavns Boldklub	16	9	3	4	42	27	+15	21
3	Boldklubben af 1893	16	9	3	4	34	23	+11	21
4	Boldklubben Frem	16	9	1	6	45	29	+16	19
5	Boldklubben 1903	16	7	2	7	33	34	−1	16
6	KFUM	16	5	5	6	24	28	−4	15
7	Østerbros Boldklub	16	5	2	9	31	41	−10	12
8	Fremad Amager	16	5	0	11	21	39	−18	10
9	Køge BK	16	4	1	11	24	49	−25	9

== Quarterfinals ==
- Randers Sportsklub Freja 1-2 Akademisk Boldklub
- Aarhus Gymnastikforening 3-0 Kjøbenhavns Boldklub
- Boldklubben Frem 2-0 Hellerup IK
- Boldklubben af 1893 3-3 Helsingør IF
  - Helsingør IF was awarded winner by lot.

== Semifinals ==
- Akademisk Boldklub 2-1 Boldklubben Frem
- Helsingør IF 2-3 Aarhus Gymnastikforening

== Final ==
- Akademisk Boldklub 3-2 Aarhus Gymnastikforening
