= Stig Tøfting =

Danish footballer (born 1969)

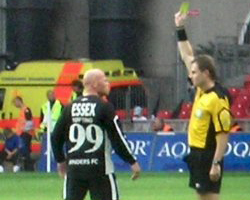
- Tøfting taking a yellow card in 2007

Personal information
- Date of birth: 14 August 1969 (age 57)
- Place of birth: Aarhus, Denmark
- Height: 1.76 m (5 ft 9 in)
- Position: Midfielder

Youth career
- ASA
- 1980–1989: AGF

Senior career*
Years	Team	Apps	(Gls)
1989–1993	AGF	95	(10)
1993–1995	Hamburger SV	8	(0)
1994	→ OB (loan)	12	(3)
1994	→ AGF (loan)	6	(1)
1995	→ AGF (loan)	8	(1)
1995–1997	AGF	70	(17)
1997	OB	7	(1)
1997–2000	MSV Duisburg	69	(4)
2000	→ AGF (loan)	7	(2)
2000–2002	Hamburger SV	47	(2)
2002–2003	Bolton Wanderers	14	(0)
2003	Tianjin Teda	17	(0)
2004	AGF	29	(4)
2005	BK Häcken	23	(3)
2006–2007	Randers	30	(2)
Total		442	(50)

International career
1990–1992	Denmark U21	5	(0)
1993–2002	Denmark	41	(2)

Managerial career
- 2007–2009: Randers (assistant)
- 2010: AGF (assistant)
Medal record
Men's football
Representing Denmark
CONMEBOL–UEFA Cup of Champions
Runner-up	1993 Argentina
- * Club domestic league appearances and goals

Stig Tøfting (born 14 August 1969), commonly known as Tøffe, is a Danish former professional footballer and assistant coach, who most recently was the assistant of Erik Rasmussen at AGF.

Tøfting was a hard-hitting combative defensive midfielder who often made rash tackles. He started his career with AGF Aarhus, with whom he won two Danish Cups, and most notably went on to play for German clubs Hamburger SV and MSV Duisburg, as well as Bolton Wanderers in England. He ended his career in 2007 with Randers FC, having won the 2006 Danish Cup with the team.

He played 41 matches for the Denmark national team between 1993 and 2002, in which he scored 2 goals. With Thomas Gravesen, Tøfting formed a fearsome midfield duo on the national team from 1998 to 2002, playing the Euro 2000 and 2002 FIFA World Cup together.

== Club career ==
=== Early career ===
Born in a suburb of Aarhus, Tøfting started playing at local club ASA in the borough of Frederiksbjerg before joining the largest club in the city, Aarhus Gymnastikforening (AGF) at age 10 – a club he would frequently return to during his career. He made his senior debut on 29 October 1989 in the 1–0 victory against Aalborg BK and in 1992 won the Danish Cup with the team. He first appeared for the Denmark national team in January 1993.

In June 1993, Tøfting moved from AGF to German team Hamburger SV (HSV) in a transfer deal worth DEM 500,000. He took part in HSV's first three games of the 1993–94 Bundesliga season, before a knee injury side-lined him. He returned to the team in December 1993, but had a hard time forcing his way into the first team due to league restrictions on the number of foreign players in the starting line-up. He was loaned out to Danish club Odense BK, playing 12 games in the last half of the 1993–94 Danish Superliga season as Odense finished in fourth place. He was loaned out to AGF in the first half of the 1994–95 Danish Superliga season, before returning to HSV in winter 1994. He played a further three games for HSV as a substitute, before he was once again loaned out to AGF in April 1995.

Tøfting returned to AGF on a permanent contract in June 1995 in a transfer deal worth DKK 1.2 million. He was named Man of the Match as he won his second Danish Cup triumph with AGF, and was called up for Denmark once again, after a three-year hiatus.

=== German success ===
As his contract expired in the summer 1997, Tøfting moved from AGF to league rivals Odense BK on a free transfer. He did not get along well with Odense coach Roald Poulsen, and was suspended from the club in October 1997. Tøfting agreed a DKK 1 million move to defending Superliga champions Brøndby IF, but as Odense increased their asking price to DKK 2 million, the move fell through. He eventually moved back to Germany to play for MSV Duisburg in January 1998, in a DKK 600,000 transfer deal. Despite being a newly promoted team in the 1997–98 Bundesliga season, Duisburg reached the 1998 German Cup final, where they were defeated by Bayern Munich.

In June 1999, Stig Tøfting received a 20-day suspended jail sentence for an assault committed while on holiday in Aarhus. He continued at Duisburg without any repercussions from manager Friedhelm Funkel. In the 1999–2000 Bundesliga season, Duisburg were dead last in the tournament, and Tøfting was loaned out to AGF in the last part of the 1999–2000 Danish Superliga season.

As his contract with Duisburg expired in summer 2000, he moved back to former club HSV. With HSV, he took part in the UEFA Champions League tournament. When HSV manager Frank Pagelsdorf was fired in September 2001, Tøfting was worried about his status under new manager Kurt Jara, and he moved to English club Bolton Wanderers in February 2002.

=== Bolton ===
In moving to Bolton, Tøfting hoped to secure his place in the Danish national team for the up-coming 2002 FIFA World Cup tournament. In his fourth game for Bolton in March 2002, he suffered an injury which caused a two-month-long recovery. He returned to play the last game of the 2001–02 Premier League season in May 2002, and was called up for the 2002 FIFA World Cup.

He returned injured to Bolton following the 2002 FIFA World Cup. He struggled to secure a place in the Bolton starting line-up, and saw his playing time reduced to one league game and an appearance in an English League Cup defeat to Bury FC during the first months of the season. He returned took part in several games in the winter 2002, his last game being the January 2003 FA Cup defeat to Sunderland AFC.

In celebrations among the Danish players following the 2002 FIFA World Cup, at "Café Ketchup" in Copenhagen, Tøfting had head-butted the proprietor of the café. He stood trial for the incident in October 2002 and was convicted to four months in prison. After the conviction, he got his Bolton contract reduced until summer 2003. He served his jail time from April to July 2003.

=== Football nomad ===
Tøfting was released early from prison in July 2003, in order to move to China to play for Tianjin Taida. When his Taida contract expired in December 2003, he once again returned to AGF in February 2004. In July 2004, Tøfting was once more under charges for violence after he pushed a man in the chest following a traffic dispute, and received two fines of DKK 1,000 each. In December 2004, Tøfting was fired from AGF following a bust-up at an AGF players' Christmas lunch.

He agreed a contract with Swedish club BK Häcken in February 2005. At its expiry in January 2006, Tøfting moved back to Denmark to play for Randers FC in the second tier of Danish football, the Danish 1st Division. With Randers, Tøfting won the 2006 Danish Cup, and he helped the club gain promotion to the 2006–07 Danish Superliga championship. Tøfting ended his playing career for Randers on 1 December 2007, where his last match was a 2–0 defeat to Viborg FF.

== International career ==
While playing for AGF Aarhus, Tøfting was among the players selected to represent the Denmark under-21 national team at the 1992 Summer Olympics. He played full-time in Denmark's three matches at the tournament, though the team didn't advance beyond the group stage.

He made his debut with the Denmark senior national team on 30 January 1993, in a 2–2 friendly match draw with the United States. He made his debut under Denmark coach Richard Møller Nielsen, who dubbed Tøfting Plæneklipperen (the Lawn mower). He then took part in a 1994 FIFA World Cup qualification game in March 1993. After his permanent move back to AGF, he was called up for Denmark once again in June 1996, after a three-year hiatus. He was included in Møller Nielsen's squad for the 1996 European Championship (Euro 1996), where he played the last 21 minutes of the 3–0 loss to Croatia, which eliminated Denmark from the Euro 1996 tournament. Under the new Denmark boss, Swedish coach Bo Johansson who was appointed in June 1996, Tøfting was initially left out of the Denmark national team again.

In his second season with MSV Duisburg, Tøfting was called up for his fourth international appearance in May 1998 by Bo Johansson. He was once more part of a Denmark squad at a big tournament, when he was picked for the 1998 FIFA World Cup. He again occupied the role as a bit-part player, with 60 minutes of play in two games his share of Denmark's five matches before elimination. Following the World Cup, he became a mainstay in Johansson's team, only missing one game under Johansson in 1999 and 2000. He was picked for the Danish Euro 2000 team. This time he took part in all Denmark's matches, but to no avail, as the team was eliminated in the group stage, having conceded eight goals in three games.

When Morten Olsen was appointed new Denmark coach after Euro 2000, Tøfting kept his place in the Denmark team. He only missed five games under Olsen up until his international retirement, and was included in the Danish squad for the 2002 FIFA World Cup. During the 2002 World Cup, Danish weekly gossip magazine Se & Hør ran a story that Tøfting had returned home from school to find the bodies of his parents. His mother had been shot by his father, who shortly thereafter turned the gun on himself. The story had been kept secret for years, as Tøfting had not yet told his children. Following the incident, Se & Hør chief editor Peter Salskov was fired. Tøfting played in all Denmark's matches at the tournament. His last appearance for the Denmark national team would be the 3–0 defeat to England in the first knock-out round, as he announced his international retirement following the match, having played a total 41 international games for Denmark.

== Coaching career ==
In November 2006, Tøfting took on the role of assistant to coach Lars Olsen at Randers while he continued as a player. Tøfting remained as assistant coach after Randers appointed Colin Todd as head coach in the Summer 2007, but when Randers appointed John Faxe Jensen as new manager in January 2009, Tøfting's contract was not renewed, and he left Randers in the Summer 2009.

In April 2010 he was named new assistant coach for Erik Rasmussen at AGF Aarhus. When AGF year, Erik Rasmussen was sacked, due to the club being relegated. Tøfting left the club at the same time.

== Honours ==
AGF

- Danish Cup: 1991–92, 1995–96

Randers

- Danish Cup: 2005–06

== Bibliography ==
- Tøfting, Stig (2005). No regrets. København: People's Press. ISBN 978-87-7055-133-5.
