= John Stampe =

Danish footballer and coach (1957-2012)

Personal information
- Full name: John Stampe Møller
- Date of birth: 16 February 1957
- Place of birth: Aaby, Denmark
- Date of death: 29 July 2012 (aged 55)
- Position: Defender

Youth career
- Aabyhøj IF

Senior career*
| Years | Team | Apps | (Gls) |
| 1975–1976 | Aabyhøj IF | | |
| 1977–1991 | AGF Aarhus | 444 | (12) |

International career
| 1985 | Denmark | 1 | (0) |

Managerial career
- 1993–1995: Randers Freja (assistant)
- 1995–1999: AGF Aarhus (youth)
- 1999–2000: Vorup FB
- 2001–2002: AGF Aarhus
- 2003–2006: Aabyhøj IF
- 2007–2012: Brabrand IF (assistant)
- * Club domestic league appearances and goals

John Stampe Møller (16 February 1957 – 29 July 2012) was a Danish football player and coach.

He played 444 games (and scored 12 goals) for AGF Aarhus and 1 game for the Denmark national team. He later managed his former club AGF.
