= 1986 Danish 1st Division =

41st season of Danish 1st Division

Danish 1st Division
- Season: 1986

The 1986 Danish 1st Division season was the 41st season of the Danish 1st Division league championship, governed by the Danish Football Association.

The Danish champions qualified for the European Cup 1987-88 qualification, while the second placed team qualified for the qualification round of the UEFA Cup 1987-88. The two lowest placed teams of the tournament was directly relegated to the Danish 2nd Division. Likewise, the Danish 2nd Division champions and runners-up were promoted to the 1st Division.

== Table ==
Pos	Team	Pld	W	D	L	GF	GA	GD	Pts
1	Aarhus GF	26	17	7	2	49	22	+27	41
2	Brøndby IF	26	18	1	7	52	30	+22	37
3	Næstved IF	26	13	9	4	43	23	+20	35
4	Lyngby BK	26	12	8	6	40	29	+11	32
5	B 1903	26	10	9	7	40	33	+7	29
6	Ikast FS	26	11	6	9	42	36	+6	28
7	Vejle BK	26	9	9	8	37	36	+1	27
8	Odense BK	26	10	6	10	38	32	+6	26
9	Brønshøj BK	26	10	5	11	54	42	+12	25
10	KB	26	9	6	11	33	43	−10	24
11	Herfølge BK	26	8	6	12	30	44	−14	22
12	Kastrup BK	26	4	6	16	19	39	−20	14
13	Esbjerg fB	26	3	7	16	19	50	−31	13
14	Randers Freja	26	4	3	19	23	60	−37	11

Source: table

== Results ==
Home \ Away	AGF	B03	BIF	BBK	EfB	HBK	IFS	KAS	KBK	LBK	NIF	OB	RSF	VBK
Aarhus GF	—	2–1	1–0	1–1	2–1	3–2	2–2	1–0	5–1	1–2	1–0	3–0	4–0	0–0
B 1903	0–0	—	3–1	2–2	4–0	2–2	0–4	1–0	1–2	1–1	1–1	2–4	1–0	1–2
Brøndby IF	1–2	0–2	—	3–2	2–0	2–0	1–2	2–1	2–1	3–1	3–1	2–1	5–0	3–1
Brønshøj BK	1–3	4–2	2–3	—	3–1	5–0	3–0	1–2	0–1	2–2	2–2	3–0	1–0	2–3
Esbjerg fB	1–3	1–3	2–5	0–3	—	0–1	0–2	1–0	0–1	1–1	3–2	1–1	1–0	0–0
Herfølge BK	0–1	0–2	1–3	2–5	2–2	—	2–1	2–2	2–0	2–1	0–1	1–0	2–2	2–0
Ikast FS	0–1	0–1	1–2	3–1	5–1	1–1	—	1–4	1–1	3–0	1–1	1–0	3–2	1–1
Kastrup BK	0–3	0–0	2–3	0–0	0–0	1–0	1–3	—	0–1	0–0	0–2	0–4	2–1	0–2
Kjøbenhavns BK	0–1	0–3	0–2	2–0	1–1	2–1	2–4	2–2	—	2–0	2–4	3–1	4–1	1–1
Lyngby BK	1–1	1–2	1–0	3–0	2–0	1–0	3–0	2–0	1–1	—	0–0	1–0	7–3	1–1
Næstved IF	1–0	0–0	1–0	1–0	3–1	1–2	1–1	3–1	2–2	2–0	—	1–1	3–1	2–0
Odense BK	2–3	1–1	0–1	3–0	2–0	2–2	3–1	2–1	2–1	2–3	1–1	—	2–0	0–0
Randers Freja	2–2	2–1	1–1	3–6	1–0	0–1	0–1	1–0	1–0	1–3	0–3	0–2	—	0–2
Vejle BK	3–3	3–3	1–2	0–5	1–1	4–0	2–0	1–0	5–0	1–2	0–4	0–2	3–1	—

Legend: Blue = home team win; Yellow = draw; Red = away team win.

== Top goalscorers ==
Position	Player	Club	Goals
1	Claus Nielsen	Brøndby IF	16
