= Oskar Haugstrup =

Danish footballer (born 2007)

Personal information
- Full name: Oskar Skou Haugstrup
- Date of birth: 16 June 2007 (age 19)
- Place of birth: Aarhus, Denmark
- Position: Midfielder

Team information
- Current team: AGF U19

Youth career
- ASA
- AGF

Senior career*
Years	Team	Apps	(Gls)
2025–	AGF	3	(0)
- * Club domestic league appearances and goals as of 21:28, 10 January 2026 (UTC)

Oskar Skou Haugstrup (born 16 June 2007) is a Danish footballer who plays as a midfielder for the U-19 squad of Danish Superliga club AGF.

== Career ==
Haugstrup is a product of ASA Fodbold, and later in his youth career, he transferred to AGF as a U14 player. In AGF, he worked his way up through the club's youth academy.

On 30 April 2025, Haugstrup was called up to the first-team squad for the first time ahead of a Danish Superliga match against FC Nordsjælland, though he did not make his debut. He was subsequently called up for several matches during the spring, where he also remained on the bench.

On 16 May 2025, Haugstrup made his official debut, replacing an injured Kristian Arnstad in the final minutes of a Danish Superliga match against FC Nordsjælland. In January 2026, Haugstrup signed a new deal until June 2028.

== Honours ==
AGF

- Danish Superliga: 2025–26
