= Lars Lundkvist =

Danish footballer (born 1957)

Personal information
- Date of birth: 14 June 1957 (age 69)
- Place of birth: Aarhus, Denmark
- Position: Forward

Senior career*
Years	Team	Apps	(Gls)
1976–1983	IK Skovbakken		(72)
1981–1990	AGF	348	(135)
1993–1994	Randers Freja		

International career
1978–1983	Denmark	10	(1)

Managerial career
- 1990–1993: AGF
- 1993–1996: Randers Freja
- 2005–2012: Brabrand
- * Club domestic league appearances and goals

Lars Lundkvist (born 14 June 1957) is a Danish footballer who played as a forward. He made ten appearances for the Denmark national team from 1978 to 1983.
