= 1922–23 Danish National Football Tournament =

National Football Tournament Landsfodboldturneringen
- Season: 1922–23
- Champions: Boldklubben Frem

In the 1922/1923 Danish National Football Tournament, Boldklubben Frem won the championship.

== Province tournament ==
=== First round ===
- IK Viking Rønne 0-1 Frederiksborg IF

=== Second round ===
- Frederiksborg IF 3-1 Boldklubben 1901
- Boldklubben 1913 3-3 Aarhus Gymnastikforening (AGF won after drawing lots)

=== Third round ===
- Aarhus Gymnastikforening 3-0 Frederiksborg IF

== Copenhagen Championship ==
Pos	Team	Pld	W	D	L	GF	GA	GD	Pts
1	Boldklubben Frem	8	5	2	1	23	11	+12	12
2	Boldklubben af 1893	8	5	0	3	19	18	+1	10
3	Kjøbenhavns Boldklub	8	4	2	2	14	11	+3	10
4	Boldklubben 1903	8	2	3	3	22	17	+5	7
5	Akademisk Boldklub	8	0	1	7	9	30	−21	1

== Final ==
- Boldklubben Frem 2-1 Aarhus Gymnastikforening
