= Jan Lauridsen =

Danish footballer (born 1963)

Personal information
- Full name: Jan Sander Lauridsen
- Date of birth: 18 January 1963 (age 63)
- Place of birth: Aarhus, Denmark
- Position: Striker

Senior career*
Years	Team	Apps	(Gls)
- Aarhus Gymnastikforening
-1991	Viborg FF		

International career
1988	Denmark	1	(0)
- * Club domestic league appearances and goals

Jan Sander Lauridsen (born 18 January 1963 in Denmark) is a Danish retired footballer.

== Career ==
Before playing football, Lauridsen played handball in Spain and for Denmark internationally. Upon returning from Spain, he played amateur football but soon successfully trialed with top flight side Aarhus Gymnastikforening after scoring many goals during 1 game for his amateur team. After helping Aarhus Gymnastikforening win the league, Lauridsen made his solitary appearance for the Denmark national team, during a 1–1 draw with Germany. However, he retired at the age of 28 due to injury. Following retirement, Lauridsen returned to playing handball.
