= Claus Nielsen =

Danish footballer (born 1964)

Personal information
- Full name: Claus Illemann Nielsen
- Date of birth: 13 January 1964 (age 62)
- Place of birth: Kalundborg, Denmark
- Height: 1.86 m (6 ft 1 in)
- Position: Forward

Youth career
- 1970–1984: Kalundborg GB

Senior career*
Years	Team	Apps	(Gls)
1984–1988	Brøndby	110	(63)
1988–1989	Panathinaikos	20	(6)
1989–1991	Twente	39	(22)
1991–1993	Brøndby	17	(5)
Total		186	(96)

International career
1984–1986	Denmark U21	7	(3)
1986–1991	Denmark	14	(7)
- * Club domestic league appearances and goals

Claus Illemann Nielsen (born 13 January 1964) is a Danish former professional footballer who played as a forward. He spent most of his career with Brøndby, winning two Danish championships and finishing as the top scorer in the Danish league in 1986 and 1987. He also played for Panathinaikos in Greece and Twente in the Netherlands, and won 14 caps for the Denmark national team. A knee injury ended his career in 1993.

== Club career ==
=== Brøndby ===
Nielsen joined Brøndby from his hometown club Kalundborg GB, then described as "West Zealand's talent factory". He played for the club from 1984 until July 1988 in the 1st Division, at the time the top flight of Danish football, making 167 appearances in his first four years. In 1984, he scored the winning goal in the Danish League Cup final against AGF. Having joined partway through the 1984 season, he finished behind Jens Kolding, who was the club's top scorer that year with 11 goals, but Nielsen led the scoring in each of the next three seasons, with 17 goals in 1985, 16 in 1986 and 20 in 1987.

Nielsen was named Brøndby's player of the year for 1985, and was the leading scorer in the Danish league in 1986 and 1987. He was part of the Brøndby sides that won the Danish championship in 1985 and 1987, and left for Panathinaikos midway through the 1988 season.

=== Panathinaikos ===
In 1988, Panathinaikos paid 7.6 million kroner for Nielsen, a Danish transfer record at the time. He scored six goals in 20 league appearances in the 1988–89 season, winning the Greek Super Cup in 1988 and the Greek Cup in 1989, but was unable to establish himself in the side and left after a single season.

=== Twente ===
In July 1989, Nielsen signed a two-year contract with Twente of the Eredivisie, who paid Panathinaikos over 1 million guilders for him in what was then the most expensive transfer in the club's history. He was signed as a replacement for the departed striker Piet Keur and was the club's leading Eredivisie scorer in his first season with 14 goals, as Twente finished third. A cruciate ligament injury kept him out for around six months of his second season, in which the club finished sixth. His final match for Twente was a 6–6 draw away to RKC on the last day of the 1990–91 season, in which he scored twice.

=== Return to Brøndby ===
In June 1991, Nielsen turned down a two-year contract extension at Twente in order to return to Brøndby. Knee trouble limited him to 13 league matches and five goals in 1991–92, and to four league matches the following season. He twisted his knee in a friendly against IFK Göteborg in January 1993 and announced two months later that he was retiring at the age of 29.

== International career ==
Nielsen made his debut for Denmark on 29 October 1986 in a European Championship qualifier against Finland, selected by Sepp Piontek alongside John Eriksen in the absence of the injured Michael Laudrup and Preben Elkjær. He went on to make 14 appearances and score seven goals, the last of them coming in a 2–1 win over Austria in a European Championship qualifier in June 1991. His knee injury ended his international career at the age of 27.

== Later life ==
Nielsen has long been known as Claus "Købmand" ("Claus the grocer") after his family's trade, and became a grocer himself after retiring from football, running several SuperBest supermarkets in the Kalundborg area.

== Honours ==
Brøndby

- Danish 1st Division: 1985, 1987
- Danish League Cup: 1984

Panathinaikos

- Greek Football Cup: 1988–89
- Greek Super Cup: 1988

Individual

- Danish 1st Division top scorer: 1986, 1987
- Brøndby Player of the Year: 1985
