= Frederikssund IK =

Danish football club

- Full name: Frederikssund Idrætsklub
- Nickname(s): FIK
- Founded: 10 June 1898; 126 years ago
- Ground: Frederikssund Stadion, Frederikssund
- Capacity: 1,200
- Chairman: Lars Aabech
- Manager: Todi Jónsson
- League: Denmark Series
- 2023–24: Denmark Series, Group 2, 2nd of 10
| Home colours | Away colours |

Frederikssund IK is a Danish football club currently playing in the Denmark Series. They play at Frederikssund Stadion in Frederikssund on Zealand, which has a capacity of 1,200.
