= Glostrup IC =

Danish sports club

- Full name: Glostrup Idræts Club
- Founded: April 17, 1918
- Ground: Glostrup Stadion; Copenhagen

Glostrup Idræts Club is a Danish sports club from Glostrup, founded on 17 April 1918.

It has sections for athletics, basketball, table tennis, gymnastics and volleyball. Since 2003 the football department is a part of Glostrup FK.

In 1968 the handball department's women's team won the Danish Women's Handball Cup.
