= Ringsted IF Fodbold =

Danish association football club

Ringsted IF
- Full name: Ringsted Idrætsforening
- Founded: 1 May 1903; 123 years ago
- Ground: Ringsted Stadion
- Capacity: 5,000
- Chairman: Brian Larsen
- Manager: Ronnie Bendtsen
- League: Danish 3rd Division
- 2025–26: Denmark Series Group 1, 1st of 12 (promoted)
- Website: rif-fodbold.dk
Home colours	Away colours

Ringsted IF Fodbold is a Danish football club based in the town of Ringsted on Zealand. The first-team competes in the 3rd Division, the fourth tier of the Danish football league system. The club is the men's football section of Ringsted Idrætsforening, a multi-sport association founded in 1890, and was itself founded on 1 May 1903. It has around 400 members and plays its home matches at Ringsted Stadion.

Ringsted spent its first eight decades in the regional competitions of the Zealand Football Association. The team reached the Denmark Series for the first time in 1986 and the former 3rd Division two years later, and in 1991 contested a play-off for promotion to the 1st Division. A long decline took the team as far down as Serie 2, then the seventh tier, in 2003. It worked its way back to the Denmark Series by 2010 and remained at or around that level for the following fifteen years. In June 2026 Ringsted won the eastern promotion group of the Denmark Series to return to divisional football after an absence of more than thirty years.

== History ==
=== Early years and first divisional era ===
The football section of Ringsted Idrætsforening was founded on 1 May 1903, thirteen years after the parent association itself. For most of the twentieth century the team played in the regional leagues administered by the Zealand Football Association (SBU) and did not reach national competition.

The club's competitive breakthrough came in 1986 with promotion to the Denmark Series, at that time the fourth tier. Two years later the team went up again, entering the 3rd Division East and becoming a divisional club for the first time in its history.

The high point came in 1991, when Ringsted entered a two-legged play-off for a place in the 1st Division. The team lost to Nr. Aaby on aggregate and remained in the third tier. Relegation to the Denmark Series followed, and the club's last divisional fixture of the period was played in 1993.

=== Decline (1994–2009) ===
Four seasons in the Denmark Series preceded a sustained decline through the regional leagues, which the club dates to a fall out of national competition in 2000. The slide ended only with relegation to Series 2 in 2003, the lowest position the team has occupied.

The centenary of the football section in 2003 fell in the same year and was marked with a match against the Danish veterans' national team, whose line-up included Brian Laudrup and Lars Høgh.

Ringsted reached the second round of the Danish Cup in 2006, beating Bjæverskov, Præstø, Albertslund IF, Avedøre and BK Viktoria before losing 3–0 to the second-tier club AB.

A second-place finish in Series 1 took the team into a promotion play-off against Gladsaxe Hero of the Zealand Series, staged on neutral ground at the grounds of KFUM Roskilde. Ringsted won 3–1 after extra time to return to the Zealand Series, where the team finished tenth in 2009.

=== Return to the Denmark Series (2010–2025) ===
Promotion back to the Denmark Series was secured in 2010 with a 3–2 win over Tarup-Paarup IF at Ullerslev Stadion. The team finished eighth in its first season back and fourth in the second, and was third at the halfway point of 2012, two points off the lead.

Ringsted was relegated to the Zealand Series in 2014–15, a consequence of a restructuring of the Denmark Series rather than of results on the pitch.

Under head coach Ronnie Bendtsen the team finished third in the Denmark Series in 2024–25. Forward Mikkel Stahlhut scored eleven league goals that season before moving to Saaby FB, and the club replaced him with Niclas Thaulow from Gørslev IF.

=== 3rd Division (2026–present) ===
Ringsted won its regular-season group in 2025–26, taking 40 points from 18 matches with 13 wins and finishing five points clear of Gørslev. Those points carried into the eastern promotion group, where the team led a close three-way contest with Glostrup and Gørslev through the spring.

A 4–2 win over Tårnby FF in the third-to-last round left promotion within the team's own control, with a victory over Glostrup the following week enough to settle it. Ringsted secured promotion on the final matchday, 13 June 2026, winning 3–1 away to Avarta.

The club strengthened for the higher level over the summer, signing 28-year-old defender Andreas Probst Hermansen from BK Frem. Hermansen had more than 190 senior appearances behind him and had been away from playing to pursue a coaching qualification.

The first home match in divisional football, more than 30 years after the last, drew almost 400 spectators. The team was led out by the captain Lasse Green, who had been at the club since the age of five and had made around 350 appearances for it. The chairman Brian Larsen, who had watched Ringsted's previous divisional matches as a spectator in 1993, said the club had been working towards divisional football for three or four years. Its stated aim for the season was a second campaign at the level, with a top-six finish guaranteeing survival.

== Colours ==
Ringsted play in blue shirts, shorts and socks at home, and in orange as a change strip.

== Ground ==
Ringsted play at Ringsted Stadion on Anlægsvej in the east of the town. The main pitch is grass surface and is shared with Ringsted Ny Friskole.

The site also holds several artificial pitches, on which the club's youth teams and lower senior sides play, while the first team uses the main grass pitch. The first home match of the club's return to divisional football, in August 2026, drew almost 400 spectators.

== Club officials ==
Position	Name
Chairman	Brian Larsen
Director of football	Carsten Andersen
Manager	Ronnie Bendtsen
Assistant manager	Thomas Mikkelsen
Goalkeeping coach	Jonas Urgaard
Fitness coach	Louise Jensen
