= IF Skjold Birkerød =

Association football club in Birkerød, Denmark

Skjold Birkerød
- Full name: Idrætsforeningen Skjold Birkerød
- Short name: ISB
- Founded: 1917; 109 years ago, as Skjold
- Ground: Birkerød Stadium, Birkerød
- Capacity: 2,000 (168 seated)
- Chairman: Henrik Sloth
- Head coach: Lasse Lund Larsen
- League: Local Non League / Sjællandserien
- 2019–20: Denmark Series Group 1, 8th
- Website: https://www.skjold-fodbold.dk/
Home colours	Away colours

Idrætsforeningen Skjold Birkerød (Danish pronunciation: [ˈskjʌlˀ ˈpiɐ̯kəˌʁœðˀ]; commonly known as Skjold Birkerød), is a sports club based in Birkerød, Denmark. Skjold is mostly known for its association football department, which competes in the Denmark Series, the fourth tier of the Danish football league system. Founded in 1917, it is affiliated to the regional DBU Zealand football association. The team plays its home matches at Birkerød Stadium.

Skjold play in yellow jerseys, black shorts and black socks. The club's best ranking was achieved in 1983, when the first team finished ninth in the 2nd Division, which at the time was the second-tier. The club is among the largest clubs in Denmark in terms of membership, and has approximately three teams in each age group. On the women's side, Skjold Birkerød is also well represented in many youth grades, just as the club's senior women's team moved to the 1st Division in the 2012–2013 season.

== History ==
=== Formative years (1917–1940) ===
IF Skjold Birkerød was founded in 1917 as Skjold; an association football club initiated by municipal teacher Levring, who immediately after his employment in Birkerød started playing football with the male pupils. The final founding of Skjold as an organised club took place a few years after Levring had begun playing the game in the town. The foundation took place in the Lecture Association's premises. Skjold's very first board consisted of names that were already known in the town at the time, namely bicycle vendor H. Hansen, saddler Andreasen, manufacturer Axel Lauersen and the old rentier Sv. Haurowitz who with great enthusiasm and personal effort formed the basis for what is today one of North Zealand's largest clubs in terms of membership.

In the first years of the club's existence, students from the elitist boarding school could not obtain membership. This was due to the worker's club Skjold's goal of breaking down barriers in the sport of association football, which in the 19th century in Denmark was reserved for the sons of the bourgeoisie. Early on, the young workers played on "Fedtemors" court in Ebberød. The first football pitch was by the Møllevangen and Søndervangen, and the land on which the pitches were was part of the old brickworks. Changing took place in the brickworks' open barn, where annual rent was DKK 300 per year. The club was not able to build a stadium until seven years after its foundation. By then, in 1926, after a household collection, the club acquired a suitable area of Andreas Jensen's farm on lot no. 3 in Kajerød, and on 5 May 1929, the sports facility in Kajerød was inaugurated. The new home ground was realised after 111 members had voluntarily made their contribution to the completion of this club's own facility. Regarding the financial part of the construction, it had been necessary to take out a loan and a large amount, at that time, of no less than DKK 12,349 was loaned. Furthermore, help was obtained in the form of transport of the excavated land by dairy owner Henningsen, who also donated buttermilk as refreshment to the members of Skjold.

The first competitive match of IF Skjold Birkerød was against at team from Hørsholm and Skjold lost by a resounding final score of 1–22.

In the years after, the club struggled and in 1934 Skjold was close to being dissolved, but two of the club's first board members, saddler Andreasen and manufacturer Axel Laursen helped bring it back on its feet. Skjold, who throughout its first years led a neutral existence in the lower ranks first entered the historical annals, when, in 1931, 14 years after its foundation, they won the fifth-tier B-rækken (nowadays DBU Sjællands Serie 2). After this triumph, Skjold disappeared somewhat from the picture, and after short stays in the fourth-tier the team returned to B-rækken, from where they had fresh start. The first significant results that marked the club's golden age was when the first team in the 1940s reached Oprykningsrækken and secured promotion to the national 3rd Division.

On the club's 25th Anniversary, in 1942, Skjold obtained a municipal loan of DKK 20,000 for the expansion of the existing stadium, a process which began on 5 January 1942. On 4 July 1944, the expanded stadium in Kajerød was inaugurated. Birkerød then had 7,000 inhabitants and the club at this time had 1,200 members of which approximately half were active members. The construction sum was DKK 31,788. This time, the members' efforts also helped to keep costs down. By the end, there was still extra room in the new sports complex and it was decided to build an outdoor gym. The inauguration of the complex was marked with a competition between South and North Zealand in athletics. After this inauguration, Skjold's heyday started, which were followed by some of the greatest achievements in club history.

=== First successes (1940–1949) ===
After winning A-rækken (fourth-tier; nowadays the Zealand Series) in 1941 and 1942, the team went to play in Oprykningsrækken, where they finished the first season in third place, while the second season resulted in a promotion to Mesterækken, the tier just below the 3rd Division. In 1943–44, the team played in Oprykningsrækken again, and when club talent Helge Hjortdal emerged, the club began making strides up the divisions. His presence gave the team the momentum it needed before the 3rd Division became reality. The qualifying matches for the third tier were eventful. The first was against B.1908 from Amager Vest, and with a 1–0 win, Skjold reached the promotion play-off final. The final opponent was Herning Fremad from the JBU association. Herning, who were favourites for securing promotion to the 3rd Division, had 5–600 away fans travelling from Jutland. Skjold ended up victorious and won promotion to the 3rd Division. Helge Hjortdal scored a hat-trick and played a key role for the team at just 17 years of age. He later became director of the Danish Parliament, Folketinget and lived in Birkerød until his death in 2017. Skjold suffered relegation in their first year in the 3rd Division and returned to the Zealand Series.

=== New structure, new stadium (1954–1963) ===
After this successful period, some years of mediocrity followed in the lower divisions. A structure change in the leagues meant, that the divisions went from spring-autumn to autumn-spring seasons. In the spring of 1955, Skjold managed to win their Zealand Series group. This title allowed the team to be considered for the 3rd division again by competing in Kvalifikationsserien to secure promotion to the 3rd Division. The matches, however, ended disappointment for Skjold, as they almost all ended in defeat.

Already the following year, Skjold again managed to win the Zealand Series with the same team, and once again a Kvalifikationsserie was to be played for promotion. This time, the team showed that they possessed the strength – but not the luck – to pick up the finals important points necessary in order to promote. After these two successful years in the leagues, Skjold had a great year in the domestic Danish Cup tournament. However, an away matchup against AGF from the top flight 1st Division turned out to be the onset of a decline for Skjold. AGF proved to be too much of a challenge, and the match ended in a 0–6 defeat. In 1957, a number of changes took place on the first team, which meant that the older core had to give way to younger players. The results in the following years were marked by this noticeable replacement. The youth department increased and the material for the upcoming senior teams became more stable.

Structurally, the club also experienced changes. As early as 1955, the municipality had decided to build a new stadium on the location of the brickworks south of the city. Engineer Mygind Sørensen presented the proposal for a stadium facility on Høfdevangen (now Bistrupvej) for DKK 3 million calculated on a city population of 30,000 at Skjold's general meeting in March 1955. Sørensen presented the plans for a facility with training pitches, a stadium pitch, handball courts, athletics courts, tennis courts, clubhouse and leisure pool – "a measure that will probably be greeted with cheers by Birkerød's youth who are not spoiled with access to bathing". However, it would take in excess of 10 years before the plans were fully realised.

In the autumn of 1957, the gravel pitches for training could be used. However, no clubhouse or changing room had yet been built, and the grass pitch, which was to be laid in 1957, could not be used for the first few years. At a meeting between Skjold, the mayor and the city inspector in January 1959, not much progress had been made. However, the municipality's takeover of Skjold's old stadium in Kajerød was discussed. Skjold's chairman editor Carl Ettrup was reluctant, as the changing facilities, handball courts, or swimming pools had not yet been constructed, and remarkably noted that "you can not have an outdoor stadium without sufficient changing conditions". However, the municipality pushed for the purchase of the Kajerød sports park and suggested that Skjold could keep parts of the facility until the new stadium was completed. The meeting ended with the adoption of Mygind Sørensen's proposal for the design of temporary changing rooms, after which Skjold – reluctantly – agreed to hand over the old stadium to the municipality for DKK 4,000.

In the early 1960s, Skjold finally said goodbye to their old stadium in Kajerød. The new stadium was inaugurated in 1962, and was a clear improvement in terms of quality in pitch conditions. However, the new stadium lacked close contact with the spectators. In the first period after the move, the changing had to take place at the old stadium before a terrapin building became the first facilities at the new stadium at Høfdevangen, as it was called at the time.

=== Fourth division and downfall (1964–1980) ===
Until 1964, Skjold went steadily back and forth, but finally in 1964 it managed to reach the 4th Division (nowadays known as Denmark Series). The team, which at that time only counted three of the key players from the 1950s had shown that the youthful lineup combined with experienced people was the way to secure better results. The team that promoted to the 4th Division consisted of Harry Mathiesen, Poul Henrik Petersen, Jan Bay, Poul Erik Hermansen, Niels Erik Christensen, Erling Sund, Carl Johan Petersen, Helge Sterup, John Nielsen, Anders Jønsson and Mogens Larsen, coached by Einar Nielsen, who had returned after several years of coaching in other higher ranked clubs.

The years in the 4th Division were the years when the new stadium experienced many spectators and an improved atmosphere in the stands. During this period, the club also said goodbye to record-holder of first-team appearances for Skjold, Helge Sterup. Sterup was one of the players who had been key assets to the team during the 1950s alongside Carl Johan Petersen. Both had contributed into making the club a solid side and together the two players accounted for 785 first-team appearances. Their retirement in the 1960s initiated a long downfall throughout the Danish divisions.

In 1969, Skjold competed in the bottom half of the Zealand Series. Another suburban club, "Brøndbyernes Idrætsforening", were bottom rivals alongside Akademisk Boldklub (AB)'s second team. In one of the last rounds, Birkerød and Brøndby met at the home ground in Birkerød. However, Birkerød's defenders Mogens Larsen and Poul Erik Hermansen had crucial miscommunications which gave an early 2–0 lead to Brøndby. The match ended in a 3–0 loss, and since, Brøndby climbed the divisions and became a powerhouse in Danish football, winning 10 Danish championships and reaching the 1990–91 UEFA Cup semi-finals.

In the 1970s, Skjold struggled. In 1970, the club competed in the SBU Series 1, the sixth tier of the Danish football league system. In 1973, they suffered another relegation, before climbing to the Series 1 again in 1977.

=== Return to glory (1981–1998) ===
Two days before the 1981 Danish local elections, Skjold achieved, for the first time in the club's history, promotion to the second-tier of Danish football, the 2nd Division. Seven tourist buses packed with fans followed the team to Rødovre, where the decisive promotion match was played against Avarta on 15 November 1981. In front of 1,550 spectators, the team from Birkerød turned a threatening defeat into a 3–2 win. This meant that Skjold, six years after their low point in SBU Series 2 had reached the 2nd Division. Upon their return to Birkerød, the players were enthusiastically greeted at the stadium, and mayor Peter Kalko gave his last speech as mayor and congratulated the players, "who have brought the city's name on the lips of all football enthusiasts all over the country".

In their first match in the 2nd Division, on 28 March 1982, Skjold managed a 1–1 draw against the AB, and Finn Schmidt-Jensen scored Skjold's first goal in the division. A few wins, but mostly draws, meant a midtable position for Skjold in the middle of the season, but in the second half of the season the team lost steam and only just managed to avoid relegation. During the season, a total of 35,689 spectators found their way to Skjold's home and away matches. The most attended match was against BK Frem in front of 2,374 spectators.

Skjolds maintained its position in the 2nd Division for three seasons until suffering relegation in November 1985, after which, from 1986 and on, they had to settle for a place in the 3rd Division East group. They later relegated to the Denmark Series again.

In the autumn of 1993, Skjold was about to promote up to the 3rd Division after 14 wins in a row, but then lost the decisive match 0–2 to Haderslev. The following year, they finally promoted, but after only two years they moved down again in 1996. Again, it took two years before Skjold in 1998 was again to be found in the divisions and at the turn of the millennium, Skjold competed in the new 2nd Division, the third tier of the Danish football leagues.

=== 1st Division and recent years (2000–present) ===
On 18 June 2000, Skjold Birkerød won promotion to the Danish 1st Division (second-tier) for the second time in club history after an 8–0 win over Nørresundby Boldklub. As head coach Tonny Nielsen had taken over the reins before their debut in the second tier, the club had to face fellow promoted Skive IK in a home match on 29 July 2000. Skjold won the match 3–1. After a strong start, the team began struggling and finally suffered relegation after only one year in the division. Their final match of the season ended in a 3–2 win over B 1913 as striker Gert Baunsgaard scored a hat-trick.

== Personnel ==
=== Current technical staff ===
Position	Name
Chairman of the board	(Denmark) Henrik Sloth
Head coach	(Denmark) Thomas Gammelgaard
Assistant coach	(Greenland) Thomas Høegh

== See also ==
- IF Skjold Birkerød players
