= Dragør Boldklub =

Danish football club

- Founded: 21 May 1907; 119 years ago
- Ground: Hollænderhallen, Dragør
- Capacity: 1,000
- Coach: Kim Damkær
- League: Copenhagen Series (2024–25)

Dragør Boldklub (DB for short) is a Danish football club based in Dragør, on the island of Amager. Founded on 21 May 1907, it is the oldest existing football club on the island. The club's best league finish came in the 1944–45 Danish War Tournament, where they placed sixth in their group. Dragør Boldklub last competed at the highest level of Danish football during that tournament. In the 2008–09 season, the club was part of the professional superstructure, FC Amager.

== Club's honours ==
=== Domestic ===
- Københavnsserien (V)
  - Winners (3): 1972 (A), 1978, 2005
  - Runner-Up (1): 1977 (A)

== Achievements ==
- 4 seasons in the Highest Danish League
- 0 seasons in the Second Highest Danish League
- 13 seasons in the Third Highest Danish League
- 1 seasons in the Fourth Highest Danish League
