= Odense Kammeraternes Sportsklub =

Association football club in Denmark

OKS
- Full name: Odense Kammeraternes Sportsklub (Odense Comrades Sports Club)
- Short name: OKS
- Founded: 30 January 1930; 95 years ago
- Ground: OKSon Park
- Chairman: Klavs Bo Nygaard Larsen
- Head coach: Mads Lynge Hansen
- League: Denmark Series
- 2024–25: Denmark Series Group 3, 4th of 10; Promotion group West, 10th of 10
- Website: http://www.oks.dk/
Home colours

Odense Kammeraternes Sportsklub, commonly known as OKS, is a Danish association football club. Founded 1930 in Odense, Funen, the club's home ground is OKSon Park. The first team competes in the fifth-tier Denmark Series and is part of the local DBU Funen governing body.

== History ==
On 30 January 1930, Gasværkets Sportsklub, Elværkets Sportsklub and Telefonvæsenets Sportsklub merged and formed Odense Kommunale Sportsklub (Odense Communal Sports Club), shortened to OKS. The club became a part of Dansk Arbejder Idrætsforbund (Danish Worker's Sports Association), which nowadays is part of the National Olympic Committee and Sports Confederation of Denmark (DIF). In 1945, the full name of the club was changed to Odense Kammeraternes Sportsklub, which meant that the shortened name of OKS was preserved. Today, OKS is home to a large number of senior men's and women's teams as well as a youth academy, and the club has over 600 paying members.

=== Successes in the 1980s ===
The home ground, OKSon Park, was home to high level football in the 1980s, and also experienced its record attendance during this time period. This was achieved in a match against B1909, where 2,800 spectators were present. In 1979, OKS reached promotion to the 3rd Division for the first time in club history and even managed successive promotions; suddenly competing in the second-tier 2nd Division on the threshold of the Danish Football Championship. During this period the club was managed by Roald Poulsen, who most prominently would win the league with Odense Boldklub in 1989. OKS managed to stay at the second level for several years, with players such as former international Vilhelm Munk Nielsen, and with capital injection secured by local sponsor Bendix Capital.

In 1990, OKS relegated to the third highest level. After that, the club was caught up in financial trouble and began a slide down the divisions. This was partly caused by star player Allan Hansen, who had formerly played for Bundesliga club Hamburger SV. A financial guarantee in his contract was not met, which left the club in uncertainty after its main sponsors had also withdrawn their financial support. However, they managed to establish an agreement with their creditors which kept the club afloat financially.

=== Recent years ===
Since its heyday in the 1980s, OKS has spent most of its existence in the Denmark Series and Funen Series – the fourth and fifth tiers of Danish football. In August 2016, Roald Poulsen returned to OKS in the role of managing assistant. The first team reached promotion to the Denmark Series on 17 June 2019 after a 4–1 win over Marstal/Rise in front of 325 spectators.
