= Aarhus Gymnastikforening =

Association football club in Denmark

AGF
- Full name: Aarhus Gymnastikforening
- Nicknames: GF; De Hvii'e (The Whites in Mid-Eastern Jutlandic dialect); Byens Hold (The City's Team)
- Short name: AGF
- Founded: 1880 September 26; 146 years ago
- Ground: Ceres Park Vejlby (Temporary, pending construction of a new Aarhus Stadium)
- Capacity: 11,500 (3,400 seated)
- Chairman: Jacob Nielsen
- Head coach: Jakob Poulsen
- League: Danish Superliga
- 2025–26: Danish Superliga, 1st of 12 (champions)
- Website: agf.dk
Home colours	Away colours

Aarhus Gymnastikforening (Danish: [ˈɒːˌhuˀs kymnaˈstikfʌˌe̝ˀne̝ŋ], lit. 'Aarhus Gymnastic Union'; commonly known as AGF Danish: [æke̝ˀˈef]) is a professional sports club based in Aarhus, Jutland, Denmark. Founded in 1880, it is one of the oldest clubs in the country where gymnastics and fencing were featured as its main sports. However, AGF is mostly known for its football department, which was established in 1902. The club's first team plays in the Danish Superliga, the top flight of the Danish football league system.

AGF has won six Danish Football Championships - most recently in the season of 2025–26 - and nine Danish Cups. In 1961, AGF reached the quarter-finals of the European Cup where they were knocked out by later winners, Benfica. In 1989, AGF again reached a European quarter-final, this time in the European Cup Winners' Cup, where they lost 1–0 on aggregate to later winners FC Barcelona. They won the Atlantic Cup twice, in 2018 and 2020.

Finally in 2026 the team won the Superliga making it their first 2000s Superliga title.

== History ==
AGF played its first football match against Aarhus Idrætsklub Olympia in November 1902, a 5–2 loss. Six years later, the club won the Jutland Football Championship by winning 3–2 over Ringkøbing IF in the final. AGF won the Jutland Football Championship seven times and was in three finals of the Danish Football Championship before AGF became a member of the newly founded Denmark Tournament in 1927.

In 1911, AGF got its own clubhouse after which the club bought the pitches at Dalgas Avenue. In 1920, AGF began to play its home matches at the newly built Aarhus Stadium, where the club has played ever since. In 1941, the club moved from the clubhouse at Dalgas Avenue to Fredensvang in the suburb of Viby J. For three consecutive seasons (1949 to 1951) AGF finished in third place in the top division. After spending the 1952–53 season in the 2nd Division, AGF returned strongly to the 1st Division and in the next 12 seasons won four Danish Football Championships and five Danish Cups. AGF also participated in the first edition of the European Cup, where they lost 4–2 on aggregate to French club Reims with three goals scored by Léon Glovacki. In 1961, AGF reached the quarter-final in the same tournament where they lost to eventual tournament winners Benfica. AGF were relegated to the 2nd Division in 1968 and in 1973 but returned to the 1st Division in 1976. This was the start of 30 continuous years in the top division.

The introduction of professional football in Denmark had a major influence on the success AGF experienced from the late 1970s and forward until 1998. With former Real Madrid star Henning Jensen on the team, AGF were close at winning the Danish Football Championship in 1982. AGF drew 2–2 against B.93 in the last game of the season which sent the championship to OB. In 1984, AGF were again close to clinching the championship but lost by a single point to the rivals from Vejle Boldklub. Finally in 1986, AGF won their fifth Danish Football Championship. Flemming Povlsen, Jan Bartram and John Stampe were the key players of the team these years. In 1987, 1988 and 1992 AGF also won the Danish Cup.

In 1996, with players such as Stig Tøfting and Håvard Flo, AGF were again close to winning the Danish Football Championship, but lost the title to Brøndby IF in dramatic fashion on the fourth to last matchday when opposing goalkeeper Mogens Krogh headed in the 3–3 equaliser. AGF would, however, win the Danish Cup that season by beating Brøndby.

In 1998, AGF finished third in the Danish Superliga but financial problems resulted in poor results the following years. In 2000, Peter Rudbæk was fired after seven years as manager. From 2000 onwards, the club experienced some of its worst ever results, which led to relegations in the 2005–06, 2009–10 and 2013–14 seasons. Each time, however, the club secured a quick return to the top-flight.

In the summer of 2014, AGF appointed Jacob Nielsen as their new director. Nielsen had been successful as director of Randers where he had managed to secure good economic results. AGF also hired a new sporting director and Morten Wieghorst as manager. On 6 December 2015, however, Nielsen announced that Wieghorst was fired and that former Danish champion Glen Riddersholm was hired as his replacement.

With Riddersholm as manager AGF finished the 2015–16 season in tenth place having won three games, drawn seven, and lost five in the remainder of the season. AGF qualified for 2016 cup final, in which they lost 2–1 to FC Copenhagen. In the 2016–17 season, AGF finished 11th after having played relegation play-off matches in the new league structure introduced that season.

On 30 September 2017, Riddersholm was fired due to inconsistent results. At that point AGF was seventh in the league having started the 2017–18 season with four wins, five defeats, and two draws. Riddersholm's last match was a 5–1 win against FC Helsingør. New manager was David Nielsen who started with four consecutive league defeats but finished the season in seventh place after losing a European play-off final against FC Copenhagen 4–1. After reaching eighth place in 2018–19 season, the club managed to win the bronze medal in the 2019–20 season.

On 10 May 2026, AGF and first-year head coach Jakob Poulsen achieved the club's first Danish championship since 1986 following a 2–0 away win over Brøndby.

== Rivalries ==
=== Brøndby IF ===
AGF's primary rival is Brøndby IF, due to the teams close matchups in the 1980s - 1990s. Most notable is Brøndby equalising 3-3 on a goalkeeper header, in round 30 of 33 in the 1995-96 Superliga, played home at AGF. This goal is remembered as the decisive goal of that season. But as a matter of fact, AGF regained first place in the next round. In round 32 Brøndby took over first place and stayed there.

In the 2020-21 season, AGF and Brøndby played the second-to-last round in Aarhus, and due to an error by AGF defender Sebastian Hausner, Brøndby secured a 2-1 win, meaning Brøndby took over first place in the league. Brøndby eventually ended the season by becoming champions.

Other notable matches between the rivals include another 3-3 match, this time on the last day of the 2022-23 season, where AGF were 0-3 behind at home and playing 10 against 11 with less than 20 minutes remaining, but managed to get 3-3 due to Jelle Duin scoring two goals and winning a penalty, securing third place in the league and the bronze medals

In the 2023-24 season, AGF beat Brøndby 3-2 in Brøndby on the last day of the season, which helped FC Midtjylland secure the championship ahead of Brøndby. AGF did not have anything but honor to play for in that match.

In the 2025-26 season, AGF secured their sixth national championship in the second-to-last match of the season by defeating Brøndby IF at their home 0-2.

=== Aalborg BK ===
AGF also has a rivalry with Aalborg BK, primarily formed by being two of the oldest clubs in Jutland. The match between them is known as the Battle of Jutland (da: Slaget om Jylland).

=== Randers FC ===
AGF does also have a smaller rivalry with eastern Jutland neighbours Randers FC, although this rivalry is largely one-sided, with Randers viewing AGF as a rival, AGF does not see Randers as a significant rival.

== Stadium ==
AGF's home ground is Aarhus Stadium, which has carried the sponsorship name Ceres Park since 2015 after the Royal Unibrew brand Ceres; it was previously named NRGi Park from autumn 2006 to 2015. The ground stands in the Kongelunden sports district south of Aarhus city centre and has a current capacity of 19,433.

The stadium was designed by Axel Høeg-Hansen in a red-and-white neoclassical style as part of the broader Aarhus Idrætspark complex and inaugurated on Constitution Day, 5 June 1920, in the presence of King Christian X and Queen Alexandrine. The first football match had been played a week earlier, on 27 May 1920, when AGF faced local rivals Aarhus 1900 in a friendly, and the first Denmark international followed there on 27 September 1925 against Finland. A concrete grandstand and the standing-only Ebeltoft terrace, added in the 1930s, took capacity to about 24,000; the stadium's record attendance of 23,990 was set on 23 October 1962, when AGF lost 4–0 at home to Esbjerg fB.

Between 1999 and 2001, the stadium was substantially rebuilt as part of a wider redevelopment of the Aarhus Idrætspark complex that also produced the adjoining Djurslands Bank Arena; the new two-tier main grandstand brought the all-seated capacity to 20,032, later reduced to 19,433 after VIP modifications. The ground subsequently hosted several Denmark internationals, including a friendly against Paraguay in May 2006, two Euro 2008 qualifiers reassigned from Copenhagen the following year, and the final of the 2011 UEFA European Under-21 Football Championship. AGF lifted the 1996 Danish Cup at the stadium with a 2–0 win over Brøndby IF — the club's most recent major honour until its 2026 league title.

In December 2022, Aarhus Municipality selected a Zaha Hadid Architects-led team with Sweco and Tredje Natur to design a replacement on the same site, given the working name "Skovens Arena" ("Forest Arena"), with a planned capacity of about 24,000. Demolition of the existing stadium began in early 2024 with the dismantling of the main grandstand, several thousand seats from which were salvaged for reuse. The project was originally budgeted at around DKK 650 million and scheduled for completion in summer 2026, but soil conditions and contractor disputes brought the total construction cost to DKK 994.6 million following a supplementary appropriation in December 2024, and the opening was put back first to late 2026 and then to the start of the second half of the 2026–27 Superliga season in March 2027.

The project has attracted considerable public debate. Critics—including parts of the city council's minority opposition, residents and architectural commentators—have questioned the cost overruns, the balance of public and private funding, and the impact of the new ground on the surrounding Kongelunden parkland and the protected adjacent Stadionhallerne. The municipality and AGF have framed the venue as a long-term investment in the city and the club, and supporters of the project have emphasised the donations of DKK 250 million each from the Salling Foundations and Lind Invest, with a further DKK 40 million added by the Salling Foundations in 2024, without which it would not have proceeded.

During construction, AGF have played their home fixtures at the redeveloped Vejlby Stadium in northern Aarhus from February 2025. The temporary ground, marketed as Ceres Park Vejlby, was created through a new hybrid-grass pitch and mobile stands with an initial capacity of about 12,000; a new main grandstand was added in summer 2025, bringing the seated section to roughly 3,400 and total capacity to 11,500. AGF clinched the 2025–26 Superliga title—their first national championship in 40 years—with a 2–0 away win over Brøndby on 10 May 2026 while based at the temporary ground.

The club's first-team training base is at Fredensvang in southern Aarhus, between Viby J and Højbjerg, where AGF moved from a previous site at Dalgas Avenue in 1941. The complex was substantially modernised from the mid-2010s with a new 1,800-square-metre clubhouse opened in 2018, additional artificial-grass pitches, and a club academy initiated the same year.

== Honours ==
=== National honours ===
Danish Football Championship

- Winners (6): 1954–55, 1955–56, 1956–57, 1960, 1986, 2025–26
- Runners-up (8): 1920–21, 1922–23, 1924–25, 1944–45, 1964, 1982, 1984, 1995–96

Danish Cup

- Winners (9): 1954–55, 1956–57, 1959–60, 1960–61, 1964–65, 1986–87, 1987–88, 1991–92, 1995–96
- Runners-up (4): 1958–59, 1989–90, 2015–16, 2023–24

=== International honours ===
- The Atlantic Cup
  - Winners (2): 2018, 2020

== Players ==
=== Current squad ===
As of 10 September 2026

Note: Flags indicate national team as defined under FIFA eligibility rules; some limited exceptions apply. Players may hold more than one non-FIFA nationality.

No.	Pos.	Nation	Player
1	GK	DEN	Jesper Hansen
3	DF	ISL	Daníel Leó Grétarsson
4	MF	NOR	Magnus Knudsen
5	DF	DEN	Frederik Tingager
6	MF	DEN	Nicolai Poulsen
7	MF	NOR	Markus Solbakken
8	FW	DEN	Sebastian Jørgensen
10	MF	NOR	Kristian Arnstad (captain)
11	MF	RSA	Gift Links
13	FW	GER	Janni Serra
14	DF	DEN	Tobias Mølgaard
16	MF	DEN	Jens Jønsson
17	MF	IRQ	Kevin Yakob
18	MF	NZL	Callum McCowatt

No.	Pos.	Nation	Player
19	DF	SWE	Eric Kahl
20	MF	ISL	Tómas Kristjánsson
21	GK	NOR	Mads Hedenstad Christiansen
22	MF	DEN	Oskar Haugstrup
23	MF	ISL	Mikael Anderson
25	DF	NOR	Colin Rösler
26	DF	DEN	Jacob Andersen
27	FW	DEN	Stefen Tchamche
28	FW	UGA	James Bogere
29	MF	DEN	Rasmus Carstensen
31	FW	DEN	Tobias Bech
33	DF	DEN	Luka Callø
39	FW	DEN	Frederik Emmery
44	DF	MLI	Mouhammade Camara

=== Out on loan ===
Note: Flags indicate national team as defined under FIFA eligibility rules; some limited exceptions apply. Players may hold more than one non-FIFA nationality.

No.	Pos.	Nation	Player
15	FW	SEN	Youssouph Badji (on loan at Panetolikos until 30 June 2027)
-	FW	GHA	Richmond Gyamfi (on loan at Egersund until 30 June 2027)

=== Retired numbers ===
12 – (Denmark) AGF Fanclub Aarhus

== Notable former players ==
- (Denmark) Leon Andreasen
- (Denmark) Tom Bonde
- (Denmark) Henning Enoksen; silver at 1960 Summer Olympics
- (Denmark) Per Frimann
- (Denmark) Henry From; silver at 1960 Summer Olympics
- (Denmark) Peter Graulund
- (Denmark) Aage Rou Jensen
- (Denmark) Henning Jensen; formerly Real Madrid
- (Denmark) Mads Jørgensen
- (Denmark) Martin Jørgensen
- (Denmark) Bjørn Kristensen
- (Denmark) Søren Larsen
- (Denmark) Aksel Nielsen
- (Denmark) Hans Christian Nielsen; silver at 1960 Summer Olympics
- (Denmark) Kent Nielsen; winner UEFA Euro 1992
- (Denmark) Brian Steen Nielsen
- (Denmark) Torben Piechnik
- (Denmark) Jakob Poulsen
- (Denmark) Flemming Povlsen; winner UEFA Euro 1992
- (Denmark) Troels Rasmussen
- (Denmark) Marc Rieper
- (Denmark) Casper Sloth
- (Denmark) Stig Tøfting
- (Denmark) John Sivebæk
- (Denmark) John Stampe
- (Denmark) Claus Thomsen
- (Denmark) Thomas Thorninger
- (England) Jack Wilshere
- (Finland) Petri Pasanen
- (Germany) Yann Bisseck
- (Indonesia) Kevin Diks
- (Norway) Håvard Flo
- (United States) Benny Feilhaber

== Coaches ==
- (Sweden) Axel Gottfried Pettersson (1919–22)
- (Scotland) Thomas Brown (1922–24)
- (Denmark) Harald Hansen (1925–27)
- (Denmark) Alfred Rasmussen (1927–31)
- (Hungary) Fritz Molnar (1932–35)
- (Denmark) William von Würden (1936–37)
- (Denmark) Søren Vadstrup Jensen (1938–39)
- (Denmark) Knud Aage Andersen (1939–40)
- (Denmark) Gerhard Müller (1941–51)
- (Denmark) Peter Vesterbak (1952–54)
- (Hungary) Géza Toldi (1954–56)
- (Denmark) Peter Vesterbak (1956–58)
- (Austria) Walther Pfeiffer (1959–60)
- (Hungary) Géza Toldi (1960–64)
- (Denmark) Henry From (1965–66)
- (Denmark) Erik Kuld Jensen (1967–68)
- (Denmark) Kaj Christensen (1969–73)
- (England) Jimmy Strain (1974)
- (Denmark) Henry From (1974–75)
- (Denmark) Jørn Bjerregaard (1976)
- (Denmark) Erik Christensen (1977–79)
- (Denmark) Poul Erik Bech (1980–83)
- (Germany) Jürgen Wähling (1984–86)
- (Denmark) Jens Harmsen (1986)
- (Denmark) Allan Hebo Larsen (1987–88)
- (Denmark) Jens Harmsen (1989)
- (Denmark) Ole Brandenborg (1990)
- (Denmark) Lars Lundkvist (1990–93)
- (Denmark) Peter Rudbæk (1993–00)
- (Denmark) Lars Lundkvist & (Denmark) Kent Nielsen (2000)
- (Denmark) Ove Christensen (2000–01)
- (Denmark) John Stampe (2001–02)
- (Denmark) Hans Petersen (2002)
- (Denmark) Poul Hansen (2002–03)
- (Sweden) Sören Åkeby (1 January 2004 – 31 December 2005)
- (Denmark) Brian Steen Nielsen & (Denmark) Jesper Tollefsen (2005)
- (Denmark) Ove Pedersen (1 January 2006 – 31 December 2008)
- (Denmark) Erik Rasmussen (1 January 2009 – 20 May 2010)
- (Denmark) Peter Sørensen (1 July 2010 – 26 February 2014)
- (Denmark) Jesper Fredberg (27 February 2014 – 30 May 2014)
- (Denmark) Morten Wieghorst (30 May 2014 – 5 December 2015)
- (Denmark) Glen Riddersholm (6 December 2015 – 30 September 2017)
- (Denmark) David Nielsen (2 October 2017 – 21 May 2022)
- (Germany) Uwe Rösler (14 June 2022 – 31 May 2025)
- (Denmark) Jakob Poulsen (20 June 2025 – present)

== Seasons ==
Some matches is regular seasons were played as knockout matches, as a result these are shown in the regular league columns instead of the cup column and with position replaced with win/loss.

Chart of yearly table positions of AGF in the Danish football league

Season	Competition	Pos.	Pld	W	D	L	GF	GA	Pts	Cup
1907–08	Jutland A-Series Semi-Final	W	1	N/A			2	0	N/A	N/A
1907–08	Jutland A-Series Final	W	1	N/A			7	2	N/A	N/A
1908–09	Jutland A-Series Semi-Final	W	1	N/A			4	1	N/A	N/A
1908–09	Jutland A-Series Final	W	1	N/A			3	0	N/A	N/A
1909–10	Unknown									N/A
1910–11	Unknown									N/A
1911–12	Jutland A-Series Circuit Final Qualifiers	L	1	N/A			2	3	N/A	N/A
1912–13	Unknown									DNQ
1913–14	Unknown									DNQ
1914–15	Jutland A-Series North Circuit 1	1	3	2	0	1	14	3	4	DNQ
1914–15	Jutland A-Series North Circuit 1 1st place rematch	L	1	N/A			1	4	N/A	DNQ
1915–16	Jutland A-Series South Circuit 4	3	6	1	2	3	14	19	4	DNQ
1916–17	Jutland A-Series South Circuit 4	2	6	4	1	1	13	8	9	DNQ
1917–18	Jutland A-Series South Circuit 5	2	6	3	1	2	unk.	unk.	7	DNQ
1918–19	Jutland A-Series North Circuit 2	1	6	5	0	1	33	7	10	4th
1918–19	Jutland A-Series North Circuit Semi-final	W	1	N/A			4	3	N/A	4th
1918–19	Jutland A-Series North Circuit Final	W	1	N/A			2	0	N/A	4th
1918–19	Jutland A-Series Final	W	1	N/A			4	1	N/A	4th
1919–20	Jutland A-Series North Circuit 3	1	6	6	0	0	25	3	12	DNQ
1919–20	Jutland A-Series North Circuit Semi-final	L	1	N/A			2	3	N/A	DNQ
1920–21	Jutland A-Series North Circuit 2	1	6	6	0	0	30	0	12	RU
1920–21	Jutland A-Series North Circuit Semi-final	W	1	N/A			6	1	N/A	RU
1920–21	Jutland A-Series North Circuit Final	W	1	N/A			5	3	N/A	RU
1920–21	Jutland A-Series Final	W	1	N/A			2	0	N/A	RU
1921–22	Jutland A-Series North Circuit 2	1	6	5	0	1	30	9	10	3rd
1921–22	Jutland A-Series North Circuit Final	W	1	N/A			4	1	N/A	3rd
1921–22	Jutland A-Series Final	W	1	N/A			4	0	N/A	3rd
1922–23	Jutland Championship Series	1	10	8	1	1	39	9	17	RU
1923–24	Jutland Championship Series	2	10	6	1	3	24	17	13	DNQ
1924–25	Jutland Championship Series	1	10	6	3	1	22	9	15	RU
1925–26	Jutland Championship Series	4	10	3	3	4	33	26	9	DNQ
1926–27	Jutland Championship North Circuit	3	10	6	0	4	26	23	12	DNQ
1927–28	Danish Championship Tournament 2nd Circuit	2	3	1	2	0	5	3	4	N/A
1927–28	Jutland Championship North Circuit	2	10	6	2	2	36	17	14	N/A
1928–29	Danish Championship Tournament 1st Circuit	1	4	3	1	0	14	3	7	N/A
1928–29	Danish Championship Tournament Final Round	5	4	0	2	2	3	7	2	N/A
1928–29	Jutland Championship North Circuit	2	10	5	1	4	23	14	11	N/A
1929–30	Promotion Series	1	6	5	0	1	21	13	10	N/A
1929–30	Jutland Championship North Circuit	3	10	6	1	3	23	16	13	N/A
1930–31	Championship Series	5	9	4	2	3	33	18	10	N/A
1930–31	Jutland Championship North Circuit	1	10	8	0	2	44	15	16	N/A
1930–31	Jutland Championship Finals	L	2	0	0	2	2	5	0	N/A
1931–32	Championship Series	7	9	2	1	6	18	31	5	N/A
1931–32	Jutland Championship North Circuit	3	10	5	1	4	21	21	11	N/A
1932–33	Championship Series	3	9	5	2	2	20	10	12	N/A
1932–33	Jutland Championship North Circuit	2	14	11	0	3	61	18	22	N/A
1933–34	Championship Series	6	9	4	0	5	24	24	8	N/A
1933–34	Jutland Championship North Circuit	1	14	11	2	1	46	18	24	N/A
1933–34	Jutland Championship Finals	W	3	2	0	1	9	4	4	N/A
1934–35	Championship Series	6	9	4	1	4	33	23	9	N/A
1934–35	Jutland Championship North Circuit	1	14	10	1	3	39	21	21	N/A
1934–35	Jutland Championship Finals	W	2	2	0	0	5	1	4	N/A
1935–36	Championship Series	4	9	4	2	3	20	22	10	N/A
1935–36	Jutland Championship North Circuit	3	14	6	3	5	32	30	15	N/A
1936–37	Championship Series	7	18	5	2	11	28	41	12	N/A
1937–38	Championship Series	8	18	6	3	9	21	34	15	N/A
1938–39	Championship Series	7	18	6	6	6	33	32	18	N/A
1939–40	Championship Series	9	18	5	2	11	26	49	12	N/A
1940–41	Danish Tournament 1st Circuit	5	12	5	3	4	16	35	13	N/A
1941–42	Danish Tournament 1st Circuit	3	18	11	1	6	41	29	23	N/A
1941–42	Jutland Championship Semi-final	D	1	N/A			2	2	N/A	N/A
1941–42	Jutland Championship Semi-final Replay	L	1	N/A			0	1	N/A	N/A
1942–43	Danish Tournament 1st Circuit	2	18	10	3	5	46	28	23	N/A
1942–43	Danish Tournament Quarter-final	W	1	N/A			1	1	N/A	N/A
1942–43	Danish Tournament Semi-final	L	1	N/A			0	2	N/A	N/A
1942–43	Jutland Championship Semi-final	W	1	N/A			2	0	N/A	N/A
1942–43	Jutland Championship Final	L	1	N/A			2	4	N/A	N/A
1943–44	Danish Tournament 1st Circuit	1	18	13	2	3	50	27	28	N/A
1943–44	Danish Tournament Quarter-final	L	1	N/A			1	2	N/A	N/A
1943–44	Jutland Championship Semi-final	W	1	N/A			5	0	N/A	N/A
1943–44	Jutland Championship Final	D	1	N/A			0	0	N/A	N/A
1943–44	Jutland Championship Final Replay	W	1	N/A			3	1	N/A	N/A
1944–45	Danish Tournament 1st Circuit	2	6	4	0	2	19	12	8	N/A
1944–45	Intermediate Round	W	1	N/A			4	3	N/A	N/A
1944–45	Danish Tournament Quarter-final	W	1	N/A			3	0	N/A	N/A
1944–45	Danish Tournament Semi-final	W	1	N/A			3	2	N/A	N/A
1944–45	Danish Tournament Final	L	2	0	1	1	3	4	1	N/A
1945–46	Danish 1st Division	8	18	6	2	10	26	42	14	N/A
1945–46	Jutland Championship Semi-final	W	1	N/A			3	0	N/A	N/A
1945–46	Jutland Championship Final	D	1	N/A			3	3	N/A	N/A
1945–46	Jutland Championship Final Replay	W	1	N/A			3	2	N/A	N/A
1946–47	Danish 1st Division	5	18	8	4	6	48	43	20	N/A
1946–47	Jutland Championship Semi-final	L	1	N/A			1	3	N/A	N/A
1947–48	Danish 1st Division	4	18	8	4	6	38	38	20	N/A
1947–48	Jutland Championship Semi-final	L	1	N/A			0	1	N/A	N/A
1948–49	Danish 1st Division	3	18	8	3	7	36	31	19	N/A
1948–49	Jutland Championship Semi-final	W	1	N/A			3	1	N/A	N/A
1948–49	Jutland Championship Final	W	1	N/A			4	0		N/A
1949–50	Danish 1st Division	3	18	12	2	4	44	24	26	N/A
1949–50	Jutland Championship Semi-final	W	1	N/A			7	1	N/A	N/A
1949–50	Jutland Championship Final	W	1	N/A			1	0	N/A	N/A
1950–51	Danish 1st Division	3	18	5	8	5	31	28	18	N/A
1951–52	Danish 1st Division	10	18	4	4	10	22	27	12	N/A
1952–53	Danish 2nd Division	1	18	16	1	1	53	14	33	N/A
1953–54	Danish 1st Division	7	18	7	3	8	31	31	17	N/A
1954–55	Danish 1st Division	1	18	12	1	5	38	24	25	W
1955–56	Danish 1st Division	1	18	12	2	4	48	25	26	SF
1956–57	Danish 1st Division	1	27	17	5	5	55	31	39	W
1958	Danish 1st Division	6	22	9	7	6	36	28	25	R4
1959	Danish 1st Division	5	22	10	2	10	39	39	22	RU
1960	Danish 1st Division	1	22	13	6	3	52	32	32	W
1961	Danish 1st Division	5	22	11	2	9	40	38	24	W
1962	Danish 1st Division	3	22	11	5	6	59	41	27	R3
1963	Danish 1st Division	5	22	10	3	9	45	40	23	R4
1964	Danish 1st Division	2	22	14	2	6	49	34	30	QF
1965	Danish 1st Division	8	22	7	7	8	37	45	21	W
1966	Danish 1st Division	4	22	11	3	8	45	41	25	R4
1967	Danish 1st Division	10	22	6	4	12	36	44	16	R3
1968	Danish 1st Division	12	22	1	4	17	10	51	6	R4
1969	Danish 2nd Division	5	22	9	5	8	30	30	23	R4
1970	Danish 2nd Division	3	22	12	3	7	41	23	27	R2
1971	Danish 2nd Division	1	22	12	6	4	50	23	30	R4
1972	Danish 1st Division	8	22	8	5	9	28	40	21	R3
1973	Danish 1st Division	12	22	5	7	10	25	36	17	SF
1974	Danish 2nd Division	7	22	8	7	7	34	29	23	R3
1975	Danish 2nd Division	3	30	17	7	6	63	48	41	R3
1976	Danish 2nd Division	2	30	16	5	9	49	32	37	R4
1977	Danish 1st Division	9	30	11	7	12	45	46	29	R2
1978	Danish 1st Division	3	30	15	9	6	52	39	39	R2
1979	Danish 1st Division	9	30	9	10	11	47	44	28	QF
1980	Danish 1st Division	4	30	14	8	8	50	40	36	QF
1981	Danish 1st Division	4	30	14	10	6	47	33	38	QF
1982	Danish 1st Division	2	30	16	8	6	61	37	40	R4
1983	Danish 1st Division	3	30	16	4	10	55	39	36	R3
1984	Danish 1st Division	2	30	15	10	5	50	30	40	R4
1985	Danish 1st Division	3	30	15	6	9	54	30	36	R4
1986	Danish 1st Division	1	26	17	7	2	49	22	41	QF
1987	Danish 1st Division	3	26	15	6	5	43	22	36	W
1988	Danish 1st Division	8	26	11	6	9	37	29	28	W
1989	Danish 1st Division	5	26	10	13	3	39	22	33	QF
1990	Danish 1st Division	7	26	9	10	7	31	25	28	RU
1991	Danish Superliga	3	18	6	8	4	29	26	20	R3
1991–92	Danish Superliga regular season	5	18	6	7	5	19	19	19	W
1991–92	Danish Superliga playoffs	4	14	5	3	6	18	15	13+10	W
1992–93	Danish Superliga regular season	6	18	6	7	5	24	21	19	R5
1992–93	Danish Superliga playoffs	6	14	4	3	7	24	29	11+10	R5
1993–94	Danish Superliga regular season	8	18	5	5	8	30	31	15	SF
1993–94	Danish Superliga playoffs	8	14	3	2	9	11	23	8+8	SF
1994–95	Danish Superliga regular season	8	18	5	5	8	21	35	15	R4
1994–95	Danish Superliga playoffs	4	14	5	4	5	21	23	14+8	R4
1995–96	Danish Superliga	2	33	18	12	3	61	28	66	W
1996–97	Danish Superliga	3	33	14	10	9	75	51	52	R5
1997–98	Danish Superliga	8	33	11	10	12	53	52	43	QF
1998–99	Danish Superliga	10	33	11	10	12	45	55	43	R5
1999–00	Danish Superliga	10	33	9	9	15	36	55	36	R4
2000–01	Danish Superliga	8	33	13	5	15	54	58	44	R4
2001–02	Danish Superliga	10	33	7	10	16	42	56	31	R5
2002–03	Danish Superliga	10	33	10	10	13	49	59	40	R4
2003–04	Danish Superliga	8	33	11	3	19	45	67	36	R4
2004–05	Danish Superliga	9	33	11	6	16	47	53	39	QF
2005–06	Danish Superliga	12	33	4	10	19	36	63	22	R4
2006–07	Danish 1st Division	2	30	18	5	7	58	38	59	R4
2007–08	Danish Superliga	10	33	7	8	18	33	51	29	R4
2008–09	Danish Superliga	6	33	13	6	14	39	44	45	R4
2009–10	Danish Superliga	11	33	10	8	15	36	47	38	R2
2010–11	Danish 1st Division	1	30	22	6	2	66	25	72	QF
2011–12	Danish Superliga	5	33	12	12	9	47	40	48	R4
2012–13	Danish Superliga	7	33	11	8	14	50	49	41	R4
2013–14	Danish Superliga	11	33	9	5	19	38	60	32	QF
2014–15	Danish 1st Division	2	33	17	10	6	59	33	61	R3
2015–16	Danish Superliga	10	33	8	13	12	47	49	37	RU
2016–17	Danish Superliga	10	32	10	7	15	45	46	37	QF
2017–18	Danish Superliga	7	32	11	8	13	35	43	41	R3
2018–19	Danish Superliga	8	32	12	11	9	46	40	47	R4
2019–20	Danish Superliga	3	36	19	7	10	58	41	64	SF
2020–21	Danish Superliga	4	32	13	9	10	48	42	48	SF
2021–22	Danish Superliga	10	32	6	12	14	31	43	30	R4
2022–23	Danish Superliga	3	32	14	9	9	42	31	51	R4
2023–24	Danish Superliga	5	32	11	11	10	42	46	44	RU
2024–25	Danish Superliga	6	32	10	10	12	53	46	40	QF
2025–26	Danish Superliga	1	32	19	10	3	62	32	67	SF

== Records ==
Since 1927, AGF has played 68 seasons at the highest level of Danish football, which is a record.

=== Other records ===
- Biggest victory: 13–1 against Fremad Amager, 28 October 1934
- Biggest defeat: 0–9 against B.93, 7 April 1946; 0–9 against B 1913, 20 October 1940; and 0–9 against KB, 15 September 1968
- Most consecutive victories: 8 (8 August 2025 – 24 October 2025)
- Most consecutive undefeated matches: 26 (4 November 1985 – 9 November 1986)
- Most consecutive undefeated home matches: 26 (19 March 1995 – 16 August 1996)
- Most consecutive home victories: 15 (7 September 1952 – 10 May 1953)
- Most consecutive matches without a win: 16 (9 June 1968 – 7 April 1969)
- Most consecutive defeats: 11 (22 August 1968 – 3 November 1968)
- Attendance record: 23,990 — AGF vs Esbjerg fB 0–4, 23 October 1962
- Most appearances: John Stampe — 444 matches (1977–1991)
- Most seasons: Aage Rou Jensen — 19 seasons (1943–1961)
- Most titles: John Amdisen — 4 Danish championships and 5 Danish Cups (1955–1965)
- Youngest player: Adam Daghim — 16 years, 187 days (3 April 2022)
- Oldest player: Jesper Hansen — 40 years, 328 days (22 February 2026)

== In European competitions ==
AGF's first competitive European match was on 21 September 1955 in the 1955–56 European Cup, losing 0–2 at home to France's Stade Reims & eventually losing on aggregate 2–4 in the first round. Since then, the club has participated in numerous UEFA competitions, advancing as far as the quarter-finals of the 1960–61 European Cup and 1988–89 UEFA Cup Winners' Cup.

== Other sports ==
=== Handball ===
The handball department AGF Håndbold has won 2 Danish Women's Championships in 1942 and 1949, and the men's team has won 4 Danish Men's Championships in 1957, 1959, 1961 and 1965.
