= Randers Sportsklub Freja =

Danish sport club

Randers Freja
- Full name: Randers Sportsklub Freja
- Nickname: Freja
- Founded: 1898 (Year of foundation)
- Ground: Essex Park Randers, Randers
- Capacity: 12000
- Chairman: Lars Willemoes Knudsen
- Manager: Michael Winter
- League: Denmark Series
Home colours	Away colours

Randers Sportsklub Freja (often abbreviated Randers Freja) is a Danish sport club with teams in athletics, handball, table tennis and football.

== History ==
Randers Freja was founded in 1898, and was accepted into the JBU in 1907.

The football department, under the name Randers Freja FC, was established in the late 1990s. In 2003, it merged with five other local football clubs to form Randers FC. The club's football department still exists, but is now considered the reserve team for Randers FC.

The handball department became part of Randers HK in 1996. In 2006 they entered in a cooperation with a list of other sports clubs in and around Randers to create the men's elite handball team Randers HH. The project was discontinued in 2020. They played in the top league in Danish handball, the Herrehåndboldligaen, in the 2016-17 season.

== Colours ==
As Randers FC's reserves, Randers Freja's colour is light blue; however, the club's original colours are white and blue.

== Stadium ==
Randers Freja play their home matches at Essex Park Randers.

== Current squad ==
See Randers FC.

== Honours ==
- Danish Cup
  - Winners (3): 1966–67, 1967–68, 1972–73
