= 1964–65 Danish Cup =

Tournament details
- Country: Denmark

Final positions
- Champions: AGF
- Runners-up: KB

The 1964–65 Danish Cup was the 11th season of the Danish Cup, the highest football competition in Denmark. The final was played on 19 May 1965.

== First round ==
Team 1	Score	Team 2
IF AIA-Tranbjerg	5–2	Bindslev IF
B 1950 Bolderslev	0–4	BK Hero
B 47 Esbjerg	1–2	Nordenskov IF
Brande IF	3–1	Vorup Frederiksberg BK
Brønderslev IF	2–0	IF Hasle Fuglebakken
Eskilstrup BK	2–1	Skovshoved IF
BK Fremad Valby	1–0	Nakskov BK
Herning Fremad	4–1	IK Skovbakken
Hellerup IK	4–0	Faxe BK
Holbæk B&I	11–1	Errindlev GI
Holmegaard GB	1–3	Fremad Amager
Horbelev BK	2–3 (a.e.t.)	Holte IF
Kastrup BK	1–0	Slagelse B&I
KFUM København	4–0	Svebølle B&I
Kirke Såby IF Thor	1–7	BK Rødovre
Kolding IF	0–1	Søndersø BK
Langeskov IF	2–1	Hobro IK
Lyngby BK	6–4 (a.e.t.)	Roskilde BK
Mørke IF	3–5	Thisted FC
Nyborg G&IF	1–3	Vejgaard BSK
Odder IGF	1–0	Otterup B&IK
Roslev IK	3–2	Bagenkop IF
BK Stadion	1–3	IF Skjold Birkerød
BK Thor	1–1 (a.e.t.) (4–5 p)	Aabenraa BK
Tved BK	4–1	Struer BK
Taastrup FC	5–2	FIF Hillerød
IK Viking Rønne	5–0	Frem Sakskøbing
Aalborg Chang	2–1	Svendborg fB

== Second round ==
Team 1	Score	Team 2
IF AIA-Tranbjerg	2–4 (a.e.t.)	Næstved IF
IF Skjold Birkerød	3–2 (a.e.t.)	BK Rødovre
Brande IF	0–7	Viborg FF
Brønderslev IF	1–0	Aalborg BK
Frederikshavn fI	4–2	Odense BK
BK Hero	1–4	Aalborg Chang
Hellerup IK	4–3	Randers Freja
Holbæk B&I	3–1	Holte IF
Horsens fS	3–2	Fremad Amager
Hvidovre IF	3–0	Herning Fremad
Ikast FS	0–1	KFUM København
Kastrup BK	1–3	Langeskov IF
Køge BK	7–0	Thisted FC
Lyngby BK	3–1	BK Fremad Valby
Odder IGF	0–3	Eskilstrup BK
Roslev IK	1–3	Søndersø BK
Taastrup FC	2–5	Tved BK
Vanløse IF	5–1	Vanløse IF
Vejgaard BSK	0–1 (a.e.t.)	Odense KFUM
Aabenraa BK	3–2 (a.e.t.)	IK Viking Rønne

== Third round ==
Team 1	Score	Team 2
AB	2–0	Lyngby BK
AGF	3–1	Køge BK
B 1901	2–3	Vanløse IF
B 1909	1–2	KFUM København
IF Skjold Birkerød	0–2	BK Frem
Brønshøj BK	11–0	Langeskov IF
Eskilstrup BK	1–3	Aabenraa BK
Hellerup IK	4–2	B 1913
Holbæk B&I	0–3	Vejle BK
Horsens fS	1–4	B 1903
Hvidovre IF	4–1	Tved BK
KB	9–1	Brønderslev IF
Næstved IF	3–5 (a.e.t.)	Esbjerg fB
Odense KFUM	3–2	Frederikshavn fI
Søndersø BK	1–8	Aalborg Chang
Viborg FF	2–1	B.93

== Fourth round ==
Team 1	Score	Team 2
AGF	3–2	Vanløse IF
Brønshøj BK	2–3	B 1903
BK Frem	0–1	AB
KB	8–4	Aalborg Chang
KFUM København	0–2	Esbjerg fB
Odense KFUM	3–2	Hvidovre IF
Vejle BK	5–1	Aabenraa BK
Viborg FF	4–5 (a.e.t.)	Hellerup IK

== Quarter-finals ==
Team 1	Score	Team 2
AGF	1–0	Hellerup IK
KB	2–0 (a.e.t.)	AB
Odense KFUM	1–4	B 1903
Vejle BK	1–0 (a.e.t.)	Esbjerg fB

== Semi-finals ==
Team 1	Score	Team 2
B 1903	0–1	AGF
Vejle BK	1–2	KB

== Final ==
27 May 1965

AGF	1–0	KB
Petersen 29'	Report

Københavns Idrætspark, Copenhagen
Attendance: 18,600
Referee: Gunnar Michaelsen
