= 1955–56 Danish Cup =

Tournament details
- Country: Denmark

Final positions
- Champions: BK Frem
- Runners-up: AB

The 1955–56 Danish Cup was the 2nd installment of the Danish Cup, the highest football competition in Denmark. The final was played on 2 June 1956.

== First round ==
Team 1	Score	Team 2
Aalborg Freja	4–3	Herning Fremad
Bagenkop IF	2–3	Haderslev FK
Ballerup IF	8–0	Sundby BK
Esbjerg B 1929	2–6	Esbjerg KFUM
Fraugde G&IF	2–5	BK Marienlyst
Glostrup IC	1–3	BK Dalgas
Hellas BK Valby	3–4	BK Mariendal
BK Hero	5–2 (a.e.t.)	Holbæk B&I
Hobro IK	8–4	Videbæk IF
Hvidovre IF	1–3	Frem Sakskøbing
Kalundborg GB	4–5	BK Rødovre
Korsør BK	4–4 (a.e.t.) (4–3 p)	Roskilde BK
Lemvig GF	3–6	Nørresundby BK
Lyngby BK	5–1	Humlebæk BK
Nexø BK	6–2	BK Fremad Valby
Næsby G&IF	3–1 (a.e.t.)	Allested U&IF
Odder IGF	4–0	Dalum IF
Sønder Omme IF	0–5	Stenstrup BK
Skagen IK	7–1	Hald IF
IK Skovbakken	4–6	Brønderslev IF
Store Heddinge BK	2–5	BK Stefan
Søllested IF	2–5	IF Skjold Skævinge
Tved BK	4–2	Kolding IF
Tårnby BK	0–6	B 1921
Viby IF	3–6	Frederikshavn fI
Vordingborg IF	3–2	Svebølle B&I
Vorup Frederiksberg BK	1–3	Nibe BK

== Second round ==
Team 1	Score	Team 2
B 1921	4–3	BK Hero
Ballerup IF	3–8	IF Skjold Birkerød
Esbjerg KFUM	4–2 (a.e.t.)	BK Mariendal
Frederikshavn fI	1–2	Lyngby BK
Frem Sakskøbing	1–0	Vordingborg IF
Hobro IK	3–2	BK Dalgas
Kastrup BK	2–3	Viborg FF
Korsør BK	2–4	Nibe BK
BK Marienlyst	7–1	BK Stefan
Nexø BK	1–2 (a.e.t.)	Odder IGF
Nørresundby BK	1–2	Svendborg BK
BK Rødovre	0–3 (a.e.t.)	Aalborg Freja
Skagen IK	5–1	Næsby G&IF
IF Skjold Skævinge	1–5	Haderslev FK
Tved BK	0–2	Stenstrup BK
IK Viking Rønne	1–0	Brønderslev IF

== Third round ==
Team 1	Score	Team 2
Haderslev FK	4–1	B 1921
Hellerup IK	2–1 (a.e.t.)	Fremad Amager
Hobro IK	2–8	Nakskov BK
KFUM København	7–0	Frem Sakskøbing
Lendemark BK	4–2	Ikast FS
BK Marienlyst	4–2	Esbjerg KFUM
Nibe BK	6–4	Odense KFUM
Odder IGF	2–5	Lyngby BK
Randers Freja	6–1	B 1901
Skagen IK	0–2	IF Skjold Birkerød
Stenstrup BK	2–1	Helsingør IF
Vanløse IF	1–0	Brande IF
Viborg FF	2–4	Svendborg BK
IK Viking Rønne	1–3	Brønshøj BK
AaB	3–0	Nyborg G&IF
Aalborg Chang	3–1	BK Rødovre

== Fourth round ==
Team 1	Score	Team 2
AB	4–2	Odense BK
IF AIA-Tranbjerg	4–3 (a.e.t.)	Hellerup IK
B.93	1–3	BK Marienlyst
B 1909	4–2	Lyngby BK
B 1913	3–4	Brønshøj BK
IF Skjold Birkerød	2–0	Nakskov BK
Esbjerg fB	8–1	Svendborg BK
BK Frem	2–1	KB
Haderslev FK	3–1	Nibe BK
Horsens fS	1–3	AGF
Lendemark BK	1–11	B 1903
Næstved IF	4–0	AaB
Randers Freja	6–2	Aalborg Chang
Skovshoved IF	1–2	Køge BK
Stenstrup BK	1–3	Vejle BK
Vanløse IF	0–1	KFUM København

== Fifth round ==
Team 1	Score	Team 2
AB	9–1	BK Marienlyst
AGF	4–1	Esbjerg fB
IF AIA-Tranbjerg	1–2	Køge BK
B 1909	1–2	B 1903
Haderslev FK	2–7	Brønshøj BK
KFUM København	2–3 (a.e.t.)	BK Frem
Næstved IF	3–1	IF Skjold Birkerød
Randers Freja	4–3 (a.e.t.)	Vejle BK

== Quarter-finals ==
Team 1	Score	Team 2
AGF	6–4	Køge BK
B 1903	1–2	BK Frem
Næstved IF	1–6	AB
Randers Freja	0–2	Brønshøj BK

== Semi-finals ==
Team 1	Score	Team 2
BK Frem	4–2	AGF
AB	2–2 (a.e.t.)	Brønshøj BK

=== Replay ===
Team 1	Score	Team 2
AB	2–0	Brønshøj BK

== Final ==
2 June 1956

BK Frem	1–0	AB
Henriksen 63'	Report

Københavns Idrætspark, Copenhagen
Attendance: 23,000
Referee: Aksel Asmussen
