= 1971–72 Danish Cup =

Tournament details
- Country: Denmark

Final positions
- Champions: Vejle BK
- Runners-up: Fremad Amager

The 1971–72 Danish Cup was the 18th season of the Danish Cup, the highest football competition in Denmark. The final was played on 11 May 1972.

== First round ==
Team 1	Score	Team 2
IF AIA-Tranbjerg	1–2	Skive IK
B.93	2–1 (a.e.t.)	Nyborg G&IF
Ballerup IF	5–3	Helsingør IF
Bramming BK	6–2	Krogsbølle-Roerslev FK
BK Dalgas	2–1	Rønne IK
Dragør BK	3–2	Hellerup IK
Døllefjelde-Musse IF	0–5	Toksværd Olstrup Fodbold
Ejstrupholm IF	2–3 (a.e.t.)	Svendborg fB
Frem Sakskøbing	4–3	Ryvang FC
Fremad Amager	3–2	Glostrup IC
Herfølge BK	6–0	Nørre Alslev BK
BK Hero	4–2	Faxe BK
Holstebro BK	6–0	Engesvang BK
Kastrup BK	1–3	BK Rødovre
Knabstrup IF	2–1	Ølstykke FC
Nibe BK	4–2	Grindsted G&IF
Nørre Uttrup B&IF	2–1	Brønderslev IF
IK Skovbakken	2–3	Tønder SF
Store Merløse IF	3–1	Frederiksberg BK
Svinninge IF	2–4 (a.e.t.)	Roskilde BK
Tved BK	2–1	Frederikshavn fI
Tårnby BK	0–3	Lyngby BK
Vanløse IF	3–0	Viby IF
Vejlby-Risskov IK	0–4	B 47 Esbjerg
Vinderup IK	0–1	Assens FC
Aabenraa BK	5–2	Aarslev BK
Aalborg Chang	1–1 (a.e.t.) (2–4 p)	Herning Fremad
Aalborg Freja	2–0 (a.e.t.)	Odense KFUM

== Second round ==
Team 1	Score	Team 2
B 1913	7–1	Herning Fremad
BK Dalgas	2–3 (a.e.t.)	Vanløse IF
Esbjerg fB	1–2	Bramming BK
Fremad Amager	5–0	Herfølge BK
IF Fuglebakken	2–0	Kolding IF
Holbæk B&I	2–5	Slagelse B&I
Holstebro BK	4–3	Skive IK
Horsens fS	10–2	Nørre Uttrup B&IF
Ikast FS	2–0	Silkeborg IF
Knabstrup IF	2–4	Store Merløse IF
Lyngby BK	1–2	B.93
Nibe BK	2–8 (a.e.t.)	Tønder SF
Næstved IF	2–4	Svendborg fB
Odense BK	7–2	Assens FC
Roskilde BK	1–3 (a.e.t.)	BK Hero
BK Rødovre	4–1	Frem Sakskøbing
Toksværd Olstrup Fodbold	2–1	Ballerup IF
Tved BK	1–0	Dragør BK
Aabenraa BK	3–2 (a.e.t.)	B 47 Esbjerg
Aalborg Freja	1–2	AGF

== Third round ==
Team 1	Score	Team 2
AB	4–3	Køge BK
AGF	3–6	Vejle BK
B 1903	3–2	Slagelse B&I
B 1913	6–0	Tved BK
B.93	6–1	Vanløse IF
BK Frem	4–0	Hvidovre IF
Horsens fS	1–0	Odense BK
Ikast FS	4–0	Tønder SF
KB	3–4	BK Hero
Randers Freja	2–1	Holstebro BK
BK Rødovre	1–4	Fremad Amager
Store Merløse IF	0–5	B 1901
Svendborg fB	0–3	IF Fuglebakken
Toksværd Olstrup Fodbold	0–4	Brønshøj BK
AaB	0–1	B 1909
Aabenraa BK	3–0	Bramming BK

== Fourth round ==
Team 1	Score	Team 2
AB	1–2	B 1901
B 1909	1–2	B 1903
Brønshøj BK	3–4	B.93
BK Frem	4–1	B 1913
Fremad Amager	4–2	Aabenraa BK
BK Hero	0–3	IF Fuglebakken
Ikast FS	4–0	Horsens fS
Vejle BK	6–4	Randers Freja

== Quarter-finals ==
Team 1	Score	Team 2
B.93	2–1	B 1903
BK Frem	3–2	Ikast FS
Fremad Amager	2–1	B 1901
Vejle BK	6–4	IF Fuglebakken

== Semi-finals ==
Team 1	Score	Team 2
Fremad Amager	3–1	B.93
Vejle BK	2–1	BK Frem

== Final ==
11 May 1972

Vejle BK	2–0	Fremad Amager
Jensen 22'; Simonsen 25'	Report

Københavns Idrætspark, Copenhagen
Attendance: 20,200
Referee: Bent Nielsen
