= 1974–75 Danish Cup =

Tournament details
- Country: Denmark

Final positions
- Champions: Vejle BK
- Runners-up: Holbæk B&I

The 1974–75 Danish Cup was the 21st season of the Danish Cup, the highest football competition in Denmark. The final was played on 8 May 1975.

== First round ==
Team 1	Score	Team 2
IF AIA-Tranbjerg	6–2	Skive IK
B 1950 Bolderslev	2–3	Frederikssund IK
Eskilstrup BK	0–0 (a.e.t.) (7–6 p)	Toksværd Olstrup Fodbold
Frederikshavn fI	2–0	Middelfart G&BK
BK Fremad Valby	2–1	BK Skjold Østerbro
BK Hero	0–2	Ballerup IF
Hjørring IF	2–3	Ikast FS
Jerne IF	2–4	Støvring IF
Kastrup BK	2–0	Glostrup IC
Kerteminde BK	2–4	Jydsk Akademisk IF
Løgstrup G&IF	1–4	Bramming BK
Maribo BK	2–1	Gislinge BK
BK Marienlyst	3–0	Harken UGF
Nakskov BK	1–2 (a.e.t.)	Lyngby BK
Odense KFUM	3–2	Flemløse BK
Rødby fB	1–3	Hellerup IK
Rønne IK	0–4	Brønshøj BK
Roskilde BK	1–0	IF Skjold Birkerød
IK Skovbakken	0–2	B 1913
Skovshoved IF	0–1	Brøndby IF
Svebølle B&I	4–1 (a.e.t.)	Tårnby BK
Thisted FC	0–1	Glejbjerg SF
Taars-Ugilt IF	3–2 (a.e.t.)	Dalum IF
Valby BK	1–4	Helsingør IF
Vester Hæsinge BK	0–9	Nørresundby BK
Vinderup IK	3–4	Skamby BK
Vojens BK	6–2	Sunds IF
Vordingborg IF	1–1 (a.e.t.) (2–4 p)	Svendborg fB

== Second round ==
Team 1	Score	Team 2
IF AIA-Tranbjerg	2–3	Bramming BK
B 1913	1–6	Frederikshavn fI
B.93	4–0	Frederikssund IK
Esbjerg fB	7–0	Glejbjerg SF
Eskilstrup BK	4–2 (a.e.t.)	Hellerup IK
Fremad Amager	2–2 (a.e.t.) (5–4 p)	AB
BK Fremad Valby	1–3	Svendborg fB
IF Hasle Fuglebakken	5–2	Aabenraa BK
Helsingør IF	3–2 (a.e.t.)	Roskilde BK
Horsens fS	1–2	B 1909
Jydsk Akademisk IF	3–0	Støvring IF
Kastrup BK	3–0	Svebølle B&I
Lyngby BK	2–0	Brøndby IF
Maribo BK	0–1	Brønshøj BK
Odense BK	2–1	Vanløse IF
Odense KFUM	1–3	Ballerup IF
Silkeborg IF	1–2	AGF
Skamby BK	1–0	Nørresundby BK
Taars-Ugilt IF	1–3	Ikast FS
Vojens BK	2–1	BK Marienlyst

== Third round ==
Team 1	Score	Team 2
AGF	0–3	Helsingør IF
B 1901	2–3	Ikast FS
B 1909	5–2	Brønshøj BK
Ballerup IF	2–0	IF Hasle Fuglebakken
Bramming BK	2–5 (a.e.t.)	AaB
Esbjerg fB	1–2	Skamby BK
Frederikshavn fI	3–1	Hvidovre IF
BK Frem	5–3	Slagelse B&I
Fremad Amager	2–1	Odense BK
Holbæk B&I	2–1	Køge BK
Jydsk Akademisk IF	2–1	Vojens BK
KB	4–3	Kastrup BK
Næstved IF	3–4 (a.e.t.)	B 1903
Randers Freja	2–0	Eskilstrup BK
Svendborg fB	3–1 (a.e.t.)	B.93
Vejle BK	6–0	Lyngby BK

== Fourth round ==
Team 1	Score	Team 2
BK Frem	2–1	Ikast FS
Fremad Amager	1–1 (a.e.t.) (3–4 p)	Randers Freja
Holbæk B&I	5–1	Helsingør IF
Jydsk Akademisk IF	1–4	B 1909
KB	0–1 (a.e.t.)	Frederikshavn fI
Skamby BK	1–4	Ballerup IF
Vejle BK	6–2	Svendborg fB
AaB	4–1	B 1903

== Quarter-finals ==
Team 1	Score	Team 2
Ballerup IF	1–3	Holbæk B&I
B 1909	2–3	BK Frem
Frederikshavn fI	1–3	Vejle BK
Randers Freja	0–2	AaB

== Semi-finals ==
Team 1	Score	Team 2
Holbæk B&I	1–0	BK Frem
AaB	1–3	Vejle BK

== Final ==
8 May 1975

Vejle BK	1–0	Holbæk B&I
Eg 4'	Report

Københavns Idrætspark, Copenhagen
Attendance: 26,300
Referee: Preben Christoffersen
