= 1967–68 Danish Cup =

Tournament details
- Country: Denmark

Final positions
- Champions: Randers Freja
- Runners-up: Vejle BK

The 1967–68 Danish Cup was the 14th season of the Danish Cup, the highest football competition in Denmark. The final was played on 23 May 1968.

== First round ==
Team 1	Score	Team 2
B 1908 Amager	3–4	Nørre Alslev BK
Ballerup IF	1–3	Taastrup FC
Bolbro G&IF	1–3	Kolding IF
Esbjerg ØB	4–3	IF AIA-Tranbjerg
Frederikshavn fI	1–0	Hjørring IF
Fremad Amager	0–0 (a.e.t.) (1–3 p)	Helsingør IF
BK Fremad Valby	4–3	Store Merløse IF
Haderslev FK	1–4	Bjerringbro IF
Herfølge BK	4–1	BK Velo
Himmelev-Veddelev BK	1–3	Horbelev BK
Hirtshals BK	6–0	Løgstør IF
Holstebro BK	3–1	Fraugde G&IF
Hundested IK	2–0	BK Stadion
Højslev Station IF	2–4	IK Skovbakken
Mørkøv IF	6–2	Skovshoved IF
Nørre Aaby IK	2–1	Lindholm IF
Nyborg G&IF	5–1	Kastrup BK
Ringe BK	3–0	Feldborg-Haderup IF
Roskilde BK	0–1	Frederiksberg BK
Rønne IK	2–4	Slagelse B&I
Sundby BK	1–3	IK Viking Rønne
Thisted FC	1–5	Viborg FF
Toksværd Olstrup Fodbold	4–4 (a.e.t.) (2–0 p)	BK Hero
Tårnby BK	1–4	KFUM København
Vejlby-Risskov IK	3–1	Ringkøbing IF
Aalborg Chang	0–1	Vejen SF
Aarup BK	2–1	Vorup Frederiksberg BK
Østre BK	3–2	Fredericia fF

== Second round ==
Team 1	Score	Team 2
B 1909	2–1	KFUM København
B 1913	10–0	Nørre Alslev BK
Brønshøj BK	2–0	Horbelev BK
Frederiksberg BK	4–2	Silkeborg IF
Frederikshavn fI	7–1	BK Fremad Valby
Helsingør IF	1–0	Vejlby-Risskov IK
Herfølge BK	3–4	B 1901
Hirtshals BK	1–2	Kolding IF
Holstebro BK	3–1	B.93 Kopenhagen
Hundested IK	2–4	Vanløse IF
Lyngby BK	0–4	Odense KFUM
Mørkøv IF	3–2	Bjerringbro IF
Nørre Aaby IK	0–2	Slagelse B&I
Randers Freja	6–0	Østre BK
Ringe BK	2–5 (a.e.t.)	IK Skovbakken
Toksværd Olstrup Fodbold	2–3	Esbjerg ØB
Taastrup FC	2–9	Viborg FF
Vejen SF	1–3	Næstved IF
IK Viking Rønne	0–3	Ikast FS
Aarup BK	0–8	Nyborg G&IF

== Third round ==
Team 1	Score	Team 2
AB	4–1	B 1903
B 1901	1–2	AGF
B 1913	3–2	Vanløse IF
Brønshøj BK	3–2 (a.e.t.)	Odense BK
Holstebro BK	3–4 (a.e.t.)	Frederiksberg BK
Hvidovre IF	2–0 (a.e.t.)	Esbjerg fB
KB	2–1	B 1909
Kolding IF	0–4	BK Frem
Køge BK	8–1	Esbjerg ØB
Mørkøv IF	2–8	Ikast FS
Nyborg G&IF	0–3	Slagelse B&I
Næstved IF	4–0	Horsens fS
Odense KFUM	1–9	Vejle BK
Randers Freja	7–3	Helsingør IF
IK Skovbakken	2–0 (a.e.t.)	Frederikshavn fI
Viborg FF	0–2	AaB

== Fourth round ==
Team 1	Score	Team 2
AB	1–0	B 1913
AGF	1–5	Næstved IF
Brønshøj BK	0–2	Vejle BK
BK Frem	3–2	Køge BK
KB	2–1	Slagelse B&I
Randers Freja	1–1 (a.e.t.) (3–2 p)	Hvidovre IF
IK Skovbakken	3–1 (a.e.t.)	Frederiksberg BK
AaB	3–0	Ikast FS

== Quarter-finals ==
Team 1	Score	Team 2
KB	1–0	AaB
IK Skovbakken	1–3	AB
Randers Freja	6–2 (a.e.t.)	Næstved IF
BK Frem	0–2	Vejle BK

== Semi-finals ==
Team 1	Score	Team 2
Vejle BK	2–2 (a.e.t.)	AB
KB	0–1	Randers Freja

=== Replay ===
Team 1	Score	Team 2
AB	0–1	Vejle BK

== Final ==
23 May 1968

Randers Freja	3–1	Vejle BK
Gaardsøe 35'; Andersen 42'; Bødker 47'	Report	Troelsen 39'

Københavns Idrætspark, Copenhagen
Attendance: 15,200
Referee: Ejner Espersen
