= 1957–58 Danish Cup =

Tournament details
- Country: Denmark

Final positions
- Champions: Vejle BK
- Runners-up: KB

The 1957–58 Danish Cup was the 4th installment of the Danish Cup, the highest football competition in Denmark. The final was played on 11 May 1958.

== First round ==
Team 1	Score	Team 2
B 1921	9–2	Svinninge IF
Borup IF	2–1	Allested U&IF
Brøndbyvester IF	2–0	Politiets IF
Brønderslev IF	3–6	Hjørring IF
Christianshavns IK	2–0	Lyngby BK
BK Dalgas	2–3	Frederikssund IK
Frederiksberg BK	6–2	Vordingborg IF
Frederiksborg IF	2–4	BK Fremad Valby
Frederikshavn fI	3–2	Randers Fremad
Frem Sakskøbing	8–1	Korsør BK
Fremad Amager	7–0	Rødby fB
Herning Fremad	10–1	Haarby BK
Holstebro BK	8–2	Ringe BK
Humlebæk BK	4–3	Horbelev BK
Ikast FS	5–4	IK Skovbakken
Lendemark BK	3–2	Hvidovre IF
BK Mariendal	1–2	B 1901
Nakskov BK	2–3	Helsingør IF
Nibe BK	6–3	Vojens BK
Nykøbing Mors IF	5–2	Grønbjerg IF
Odense KFUM	3–2	Esbjerg KFUM
Randers Freja	13–0	Aars IK
Roskilde BK	5–1	BK Stefan
BK Rødovre	5–1	Tårnby BK
Rønne IK	6–0	Faxe BK
Silkeborg IF	4–1	Nordenskov IF
Svendborg BK	2–0	Aalborg Freja
Sønderborg BK	4–3	Nørre Aaby IK
Søndersø BK	1–5	Otterup B&IK
Tuse Næs BK	5–1	Aakirkeby IF
Tølløse BK	3–4 (a.e.t.)	Nyborg G&IF
Vejle FC	1–2	Odder IGF
Viborg FF	4–3	Aalborg Chang
AaB	6–1	Brande IF

== Second round ==
Team 1	Score	Team 2
B.93	3–1	Brøndbyvester IF
B 1901	4–1	Odder IGF
B 1921	4–3	Christianshavns IK
Brønshøj BK	2–1	Frederikshavn fI
Frederiksberg BK	1–3	Randers Freja
Frem Sakskøbing	3–2	Otterup B&IK
Fremad Amager	7–4 (a.e.t.)	Næstved IF
BK Fremad Valby	2–2 (a.e.t.) (6–5 p)	Køge BK
Hellerup IK	2–0	Herning Fremad
Hjørring IF	8–3	Frederikssund IK
Horsens fS	9–0	Rønne IK
Humlebæk BK	0–8	Vanløse IF
KFUM København	4–3 (a.e.t.)	Svendborg BK
Lendemark BK	3–3 (a.e.t.) (1–3 p)	Odense KFUM
Nibe BK	4–0	Borup IF
Nyborg G&IF	4–0	Holstebro BK
Nykøbing Mors IF	1–3	Viborg FF
Odense BK	0–2	BK Rødovre
Roskilde BK	5–3	Tuse Næs BK
Silkeborg IF	1–2	B 1913
Sønderborg BK	0–1	Helsingør IF
AaB	2–1	Ikast FS

== Third round ==
Team 1	Score	Team 2
AGF	3–2 (a.e.t.)	B 1909
IF AIA-Tranbjerg	1–3	B.93
B 1921	0–8	Vejle BK
Frem Sakskøbing	2–6	AB
Fremad Amager	0–2	B 1901
BK Fremad Valby	1–3	BK Frem
Hellerup IK	4–3	Nyborg G&IF
Horsens fS	5–1	Esbjerg fB
KFUM København	1–2	Brønshøj BK
Nibe BK	1–5	Hjørring IF
Randers Freja	3–1	Odense KFUM
Roskilde BK	2–3	B 1913
BK Rødovre	2–1	Helsingør IF
Skovshoved IF	2–3	Viborg FF
Vanløse IF	3–0	B 1903
AaB	0–1	KB

== Fourth round ==
Team 1	Score	Team 2
AB	3–2 (a.e.t.)	BK Frem
B 1913	2–1	Hellerup IK
Brønshøj BK	0–0 (a.e.t.) (4–1 p)	AGF
Hjørring IF	3–2	Viborg FF
Randers Freja	3–0	B 1901
BK Rødovre	0–5	KB
Vanløse IF	2–0	B.93
Vejle BK	4–1 (a.e.t.)	Horsens fS

== Quarter-finals ==
Team 1	Score	Team 2
AB	2–3 (a.e.t.)	Brønshøj BK
KB	4–0	B 1913
Randers Freja	2–0	Hjørring IF
Vanløse IF	0–6	Vejle BK

== Semi-finals ==
Team 1	Score	Team 2
Randers Freja	0–3	Vejle BK
KB	4–4 (a.e.t.)	Brønshøj BK

=== Replay ===
Team 1	Score	Team 2
KB	2–0	Brønshøj BK

== Final ==
11 May 1958

Vejle BK	3–2	KB
Enoksen 35', 44'; Hansen 73'	Report	Krahmer 10'; Sørensen 60'

Københavns Idrætspark, Copenhagen
Attendance: 28,600
Referee: Valdemar Hansen
