= 1970–71 Danish Cup =

Tournament details
- Country: Denmark

Final positions
- Champions: B 1909
- Runners-up: BK Frem

The 1970–71 Danish Cup was the 17th season of the Danish Cup, the highest football competition in Denmark. The final was played on 20 May 1971.

== First round ==
Team 1	Score	Team 2
B 1921	1–2	BK Rødovre
Bramming BK	5–2	Vejgaard BSK
Frederiksberg BK	1–6	Ballerup IF
Frem Sakskøbing	1–6	Taastrup FC
Holstebro BK	5–1	Skive IK
Husum BK	5–2	Borup IF
Hørby IF	2–0	Sebber IF
Glostrup IF 32	3–1	Gørlev IF
Jægersborg BK	0–3	Toksværd Olstrup Fodbold
KFUM København	1–2	B.93
Lyngby BK	5–2	Rønne IK
Nakskov BK	0–2	Hellerup IK
Nørre Broby BK	0–5	IF AIA-Tranbjerg
Nyborg G&IF	7–2	Frem Hellebæk
Odense KFUM	1–0	Esbjerg ØB
Otterup B&IK	0–3	Herning Fremad
Roskilde BK	4–5 (a.e.t.)	Store Merløse IF
Silkeborg IF	5–2	Højslev Station IF
Slagelse B&I	3–0	Politiets IF
BK Stefan	2–4	Herfølge BK
Tønder SF	2–0	Gråsten BK
Vejen SF	3–0	Nørre Aaby IK
Vejlby-Risskov IK	3–0	Assens FC
Viborg FF	1–0	Svendborg fB
Viby IF	6–1	Dalum IF
Vordingborg IF	0–6	Søllerød BK
Aabenraa BK	1–1 (a.e.t.) (3–4 p)	Frederikshavn fI
Aars IK	0–2	IK Skovbakken

== Second round ==
Team 1	Score	Team 2
Bramming BK	3–6 (a.e.t.)	IF AIA-Tranbjerg
IF Fuglebakken	6–3	Husum BK
Herfølge BK	3–2	BK Rødovre
Herning Fremad	2–3	Odense BK
Hellerup IK	1–2	Lyngby BK
Holbæk B&I	4–1	Fremad Amager
Holstebro BK	4–4 (a.e.t.) (3–4 p)	B.93
Glostrup IF 32	2–2 (a.e.t.) (3–4 p)	Silkeborg IF
Ikast FS	2–1	Store Merløse IF
Kolding IF	4–3	Hørby IF
Nyborg G&IF	0–0 (a.e.t.) (4–3 p)	Esbjerg fB
Slagelse B&I	1–2	Odense KFUM
Søllerød BK	1–3	Køge BK
Toksværd Olstrup Fodbold	2–4 (a.e.t.)	IK Skovbakken
Tønder SF	2–8	Frederikshavn fI
Vanløse IF	3–2 (a.e.t.)	Næstved IF
Vejen SF	4–2	Taastrup FC
Vejlby-Risskov IK	0–2	B 1909
Viborg FF	3–5	Ballerup IF
Viby IF	1–2	AGF

== Third round ==
Team 1	Score	Team 2
B 1901	1–0	IF AIA-Tranbjerg
B 1903	4–2	IK Skovbakken
B 1909	3–2	Odense BK
B 1913	2–0	Herfølge BK
B.93	2–0	Ballerup IF
IF Fuglebakken	1–5	BK Frem
Hvidovre IF	0–1	Vejen SF
KB	2–3	Frederikshavn fI
Køge BK	2–1	Ikast FS
Lyngby BK	2–2 (a.e.t.) (4–2 p)	Brønshøj BK
Nyborg G&IF	0–1 (a.e.t.)	Kolding IF
Odense KFUM	1–3 (a.e.t.)	AGF
Randers Freja	4–0	AB
Vanløse IF	2–3	Silkeborg IF
Vejle BK	4–0	Horsens fS
AaB	0–4	Holbæk B&I

== Fourth round ==
Team 1	Score	Team 2
B 1901	0–0 (a.e.t.) (6–5 p)	Vejle BK
B 1909	3–0	AGF
B 1913	5–1	Kolding IF
BK Frem	3–3 (a.e.t.) (4–3 p)	Lyngby BK
Holbæk B&I	1–0	Frederikshavn fI
Køge BK	4–0	B.93
Silkeborg IF	3–2 (a.e.t.)	Randers Freja
Vejen SF	0–1	B 1903

== Quarter-finals ==
Team 1	Score	Team 2
B 1901	3–4 (a.e.t.)	B 1909
B 1903	4–1	Silkeborg IF
B 1913	0–3	BK Frem
Køge BK	5–4 (a.e.t.)	Holbæk B&I

== Semi-finals ==
Team 1	Score	Team 2
B 1909	1–0	B 1903
BK Frem	3–0	Køge BK

== Final ==
20 May 1971

B 1909	1–0	BK Frem
Outzen 89'	Report

Københavns Idrætspark, Copenhagen
Attendance: 23,700
Referee: Kaj Sørensen
