= 1962–63 Danish Cup =

Tournament details
- Country: Denmark

Final positions
- Champions: B 1913
- Runners-up: Køge BK

The 1962–63 Danish Cup was the 9th installment of the Danish Cup, the highest football competition in Denmark. The final was played on 23 May 1963.

== First round ==
| Team 1 | Score | Team 2 |
|---|---|---|
| Bolbro G&IF | 0–4 | Silkeborg IF |
| Brande IF | 0–3 | Tved BK |
| BK Dalgas | 1–0 | Næstved IF |
| Dronninglund IF | 0–4 | Nyborg G&IF |
| Esbjerg KFUM | 0–2 | B 47 Esbjerg |
| Fredericia fF | 2–3 | Herning Fremad |
| FIF Hillerød | 2–3 | Helsingør IF |
| Fremad Amager | 4–0 | Sorø IF Freja |
| IF Hasle Fuglebakken | 4–0 | Hirtshals BK |
| Holbæk B&I | 1–2 | Politiets IF |
| Horbelev BK | 2–0 | Handelsstandes BK |
| Kolding IF | 6–0 | Otterup B&IK |
| Lindholm IF | 3–2 | Østre BK |
| Lyngby BK | 1–4 | Hvidovre IF |
| BK Mariendal | 1–5 (a.e.t.) | KFUM København |
| BK Marienlyst | 3–2 | Aalborg Freja |
| Roskilde BK | 4–0 | Herfølge BK |
| Skive IK | 1–1 (a.e.t.) (4–3 p) | Grenaa IF |
| IK Skovbakken | 1–2 | Holstebro BK |
| Slagelse B&I | 2–5 (a.e.t.) | Lendemark BK |
| Sønderborg BK | 6–0 | Assens G&IK |
| Thisted FC | 1–3 | Ikast FS |
| Toreby-Grænge BK | 2–2 (a.e.t.) (1–2 p) | BK Stefan |
| Vanløse IF | 3–1 | Brøndbyvester IF |
| BK Velo | 4–1 | Herlev IF |
| IK Viking Rønne | 2–0 | Frederiksberg BK |
| Aalborg Chang | 6–3 | Hobro IK |
| Østerbros Boldklub | 1–6 | BK Rødovre |

== Second round ==
| Team 1 | Score | Team 2 |
|---|---|---|
| B.93 Kopenhagen | 2–2 (a.e.t.) (2–4 p) | AaB |
| BK Dalgas | 1–0 | IF Hasle Fuglebakken |
| Frem Sakskøbing | 4–1 | KFUM København |
| Fremad Amager | 3–2 | Horsens fS |
| Herning Fremad | 1–5 | Skovshoved IF |
| Hellerup IK | 1–0 | Ikast FS |
| Holstebro BK | 2–1 (a.e.t.) | Roskilde BK |
| Horbelev BK | 1–0 | Skive IK |
| Hvidovre IF | 2–1 | Nyborg G&IF |
| Lindholm IF | 1–2 | BK Rødovre |
| Odense KFUM | 3–5 | Helsingør IF |
| Politiets IF | 4–1 | Tved BK |
| Randers Freja | 0–1 (a.e.t.) | BK Marienlyst |
| Silkeborg IF | 2–1 | Sønderborg BK |
| BK Stefan | 3–1 | IF AIA-Tranbjerg |
| Vanløse IF | 3–4 | Kolding IF |
| BK Velo | 1–5 | B 1901 |
| Viborg FF | 9–1 | B 47 Esbjerg |
| IK Viking Rønne | 3–1 | Lendemark BK |
| Aalborg Chang | 2–3 | BK Frem |

== Third round ==
| Team 1 | Score | Team 2 |
|---|---|---|
| AGF | 5–0 | Silkeborg IF |
| B 1909 | 7–0 | Fremad Amager |
| B 1913 | 3–3 (a.e.t.) (4–3 p) | Esbjerg fB |
| Frederikshavn fI | 2–1 | Hvidovre IF |
| Frem Sakskøbing | 0–1 | AB |
| Helsingør IF | 2–1 | B 1901 |
| Hellerup IK | 3–1 | AaB |
| Horbelev BK | 1–3 (a.e.t.) | BK Frem |
| KB | 3–2 | Odense BK |
| Kolding IF | 1–1 (a.e.t.) (4–3 p) | Brønshøj BK |
| Køge BK | 4–1 | BK Stefan |
| BK Marienlyst | 0–0 (a.e.t.) (4–3 p) | Viborg FF |
| Politiets IF | 0–2 | BK Dalgas |
| BK Rødovre | 3–1 | Skovshoved IF |
| Vejle BK | 3–2 (a.e.t.) | B 1903 |
| IK Viking Rønne | 2–2 (a.e.t.) (4–3 p) | Holstebro BK |

== Fourth round ==
| Team 1 | Score | Team 2 |
|---|---|---|
| B 1909 | 2–2 (a.e.t.) (5–4 p) | AGF |
| Brønshøj BK | 1–4 (a.e.t.) | B 1913 |
| BK Dalgas | 0–1 | KB |
| Frederikshavn fI | 1–4 | AB |
| Helsingør IF | 0–1 | BK Rødovre |
| Hellerup IK | 5–0 | BK Marienlyst |
| Vejle BK | 2–3 | Køge BK |
| IK Viking Rønne | 0–4 | BK Frem |

== Quarter-finals ==
| Team 1 | Score | Team 2 |
|---|---|---|
| AB | 2–3 | B 1913 |
| Hellerup IK | 1–2 | BK Rødovre |
| KB | 0–1 | BK Frem |
| Køge BK | 3–0 | B 1909 |

== Semi-finals ==
| Team 1 | Score | Team 2 |
|---|---|---|
| BK Frem | 2–2 (a.e.t.) | B 1913 |
| Køge BK | 2–1 | BK Rødovre |

=== Replay ===
| Team 1 | Score | Team 2 |
|---|---|---|
| B 1913 | 2–0 | BK Frem |

== Final ==
23 May 1963

| B 1913 | 2–1 | Køge BK |
|---|---|---|
| Petersen 5'; Steffensen 19' | Report | Hårgård 15' |

Københavns Idrætspark, Copenhagen
Attendance: 10,900
Referee: Einer Poulsen
