= 1960–61 Danish Cup =

Tournament details
- Country: Denmark

Final positions
- Champions: AGF
- Runners-up: KB

The 1960–61 Danish Cup was the 7th installment of the Danish Cup, the highest football competition in Denmark. The final was played on 11 May 1961.

== First round ==
Team 1	Score	Team 2
B 1921	6–1	Frederiksborg IF
Frederiksberg BK	4–1	Rønne IK
Flemløse BK	3–5 (a.e.t.)	Nørre Broby BK
Faaborg B&I	0–2	Ribe BK
Haderslev FK	1–3	Holstebro BK
Hellas BK Valby	3–2	Handelsstandes BK
Helsingør IF	6–3	Holbæk B&I
Hellerup IK	2–2 (a.e.t.) (4–3 p)	Fremad Amager
Hjørring IF	1–3	Middelfart G&BK
Horsens fS	2–1	IK Skovbakken
Hurup IF	1–2	Skive IK
Korsør BK	0–2	IF Skjold Birkerød
Kølkær G&IF	0–4	Svendborg BK
Langå IK	1–2	Kerteminde BK
Lendemark BK	4–3	BK Hero
Maribo BK	2–5	Ballerup IF
BK Mariendal	3–2	Østerbros Boldklub
Odense KFUM	1–2	Aalborg Freja
Roskilde BK	4–3	Nakskov BK
Silkeborg BK	4–2	Nørresundby BK
Skals FF	1–3	Brande IF
Slagelse B&I	3–4	Husum BK
Store Heddinge BK	1–0	Kastrup BK
Tølløse BK	0–5	Bagsværd BK
Vanløse IF	10–0	Horbelev BK
Vejen SF	6–3	Vejgaard BSK
Viborg FF	10–0	Fraugde G&IF
Aalborg Chang	6–1	Sønderborg BK

== Second round ==
Team 1	Score	Team 2
IF AIA-Tranbjerg	3–1	KFUM København
B 1901	5–0	Vanløse IF
B 1921	3–0	Store Heddinge BK
Ballerup IF	1–5	B.93
Brande IF	3–2	Husum BK
Brønshøj BK	7–1	BK Mariendal
Frederiksberg BK	2–6 (a.e.t.)	Aalborg Chang
Frem Sakskøbing	4–2	Helsingør IF
Hellas BK Valby	1–0	Randers Freja
Holstebro BK	2–9	Køge BK
Horsens fS	3–0	Ribe BK
Ikast FS	1–4	Hellerup IK
Middelfart G&BK	1–0	Kerteminde BK
Næstved IF	5–1	IF Skjold Birkerød
Roskilde BK	4–2 (a.e.t.)	Nørre Broby BK
BK Rødovre	6–0	Lendemark BK
Vejen SF	1–3	Bagsværd BK
Viborg FF	4–2	Silkeborg BK
AaB	2–3	Skive IK
Aalborg Freja	3–2	Svendborg BK

== Third round ==
Team 1	Score	Team 2
AB	1–2	B 1913
B 1901	4–6 (a.e.t.)	Vejle BK
B.93	1–0	Skive IK
Brønshøj BK	10–1	Brande IF
Esbjerg fB	1–2	AGF
Frederikshavn fI	1–4	Viborg FF
BK Frem	5–1	B 1921
Frem Sakskøbing	2–0	Aalborg Freja
Hellerup IK	5–1	Næstved IF
Horsens fS	6–1	Bagsværd BK
KB	6–4 (a.e.t.)	B 1903
Køge BK	4–1	B 1909
Middelfart G&BK	0–0 (a.e.t.) (0–2 p)	Aalborg Chang
Odense BK	3–0	Roskilde BK
BK Rødovre	3–6	IF AIA-Tranbjerg
Skovshoved IF	1–2	Hellas BK Valby

== Fourth round ==
Team 1	Score	Team 2
Brønshøj BK	7–0	IF AIA-Tranbjerg
BK Frem	4–3 (a.e.t.)	B 1913
Hellas BK Valby	3–2	Frem Sakskøbing
Hellerup IK	5–1	Aalborg Chang
KB	5–1	B.93
Odense BK	4–3 (a.e.t.)	Køge BK
Vejle BK	1–4	AGF
Viborg FF	3–0	Horsens fS

== Quarter-finals ==
Team 1	Score	Team 2
AGF	1–0 (a.e.t.)	Hellas BK Valby
Brønshøj BK	5–0	Viborg FF
BK Frem	2–1	Hellerup IK
KB	2–0 (a.e.t.)	Odense BK

== Semi-finals ==
Team 1	Score	Team 2
Brønshøj BK	1–2	AGF
KB	4–2	BK Frem

== Final ==
11 May 1961

AGF	2–0	KB
Poulsen 21' (o.g.); Jensen 70'	Report

Københavns Idrætspark, Copenhagen
Attendance: 33,500
Referee: Frede Hansen
