= 1958–59 Danish Cup =

Tournament details
- Country: Denmark

Final positions
- Champions: Vejle BK
- Runners-up: AGF

The 1958–59 Danish Cup was the 5th installment of the Danish Cup, the highest football competition in Denmark. The original match of the final was played on 7 May and ended in a 1-1 draw. The replay was played on 3 June 1959.

== First round ==
Team 1	Score	Team 2
B 1921	1–2	Husum BK
Borup IF	2–3 (a.e.t.)	Skive IK
Brande IF	1–5	Holstebro BK
Fredericia fF	3–2 (a.e.t.)	Vorup Frederiksberg BK
Frem Sakskøbing	5–1	Østerbros Boldklub
Gentofte-Vangede IF	1–2	BK Rødovre
Hellerup IK	6–0	BK Fremad Valby
Hjørring IF	5–4	Assens G&IK
Kalundborg GB	5–2	Glostrup IC
Kammeraternes BK	1–7	Aalborg Chang
Kolding IF	5–0	Fraugde GIF
Lendemark BK	0–6	Fremad Amager
Lyngby BK	0–1	Frederiksborg IF
Nakskov BK	2–4	Brøndbyvester IF
Odense KFUM	3–2	Herning Fremad
BK Olympia 1921	0–5	Sundby BK
Ringsted IF	3–0	AIK Frederiksholm
Rudkøbing BK	2–0	Grindsted G&IF
Rødby fB	6–0	Maribo BK
Silkeborg IF	6–3	Sønderborg BK
Skagen IK	3–1	Storvorde Sejlflod BK
IF Skjold Birkerød	1–2	Kastrup BK
IK Skovbakken	2–3	Randers Freja
Slagelse B&I	0–3	Tølløse BK
Svendborg BK	2–3	Esbjerg KFUM
Viborg FF	1–3	BK Marienlyst
IK Viking Rønne	2–1	Nyborg G&IF
Aalborg Freja	4–7	Otterup B&IK

== Second round ==
Team 1	Score	Team 2
B.93	6–2	Rødby fB
B 1901	6–2	Fredericia fF
B 1913	3–4	Randers Freja
Brøndbyvester IF	1–3	Skive IK
Brønshøj BK	4–3	Frem Sakskøbing
Frederiksborg IF	0–2	Helsingør IF
Frederikshavn fI	2–0	Otterup B&IK
Fremad Amager	4–1	AaB
Hellerup IK	6–1	Ikast FS
Holstebro BK	2–4 (a.e.t.)	Horsens fS
Husum BK	4–3	Tølløse BK
Kalundborg GB	0–3	B 1903
Kolding IF	1–1 (a.e.t.) (2–1 p)	Næstved IF
BK Marienlyst	1–1 (a.e.t.) (2–3 p)	Kastrup BK
Odense KFUM	3–1	Hjørring IF
Ringsted IF	1–4	Aalborg Chang
Rudkøbing BK	3–0	Esbjerg KFUM
BK Rødovre	10–1	Skagen IK
Sundby BK	1–4	Vanløse IF
IK Viking Rønne	0–2	Silkeborg IF

== Third round ==
Team 1	Score	Team 2
AB	1–0	Brønshøj BK
IF AIA-Tranbjerg	3–2	Odense KFUM
B 1909	4–0	B 1903
Esbjerg fB	3–1	Vanløse IF
Frederikshavn fI	1–4	AGF
Fremad Amager	4–1	Skive IK
Helsingør IF	1–5	Vejle BK
Hellerup IK	11–1	Rudkøbing BK
Horsens fS	3–2	Skovshoved IF
Kastrup BK	0–6	BK Frem
KB	5–3	BK Rødovre
Kolding IF	1–2	Randers Freja
Køge BK	8–0	Husum BK
Odense BK	1–2	KFUM København
Silkeborg IF	4–2 (a.e.t.)	B 1901
Aalborg Chang	1–5	B.93

== Fourth round ==
Team 1	Score	Team 2
AB	7–2	IF AIA-Tranbjerg
AGF	3–0	Horsens fS
B 1909	4–1	BK Frem
Hellerup IK	2–1	B.93
Køge BK	2–0	KB
Randers Freja	2–1	Esbjerg fB
Silkeborg IF	2–1	KFUM København
Vejle BK	5–1	Fremad Amager

== Quarter-finals ==
Team 1	Score	Team 2
AB	3–2	Silkeborg IF
AGF	2–1	Hellerup IK
B 1909	8–1	Randers Freja
Køge BK	1–3 (a.e.t.)	Vejle BK

== Semi-finals ==
Team 1	Score	Team 2
AGF	4–2	AB
B 1909	1–3	Vejle BK

== Final ==
=== Regulation Game ===
7 May 1959

Vejle BK	1–1 (a.e.t.)	AGF
Mejer 1'	Report	Jensen 10'

Københavns Idrætspark, Copenhagen
Attendance: 33,000
Referee: Aksel Asmussen

=== Replay ===
3 June 1959

Vejle BK	1–0	AGF
Enoksen 50'	Report

Københavns Idrætspark, Copenhagen
Attendance: 17,700
Referee: Jarl Hansen
