= 1966–67 Danish Cup =

Tournament details
- Country: Denmark

Final positions
- Champions: Randers Freja
- Runners-up: AaB

The 1966–67 Danish Cup was the 13th season of the Danish Cup, the highest football competition in Denmark. The final was played on 4 May 1967.

== First round ==
Team 1	Score	Team 2
IF AIA-Tranbjerg	0–5	Vejen SF
B 1921	3–3 (a.e.t.) (4–3 p)	BK Stadion
B 47 Esbjerg	4–1	BK Thor
Ballerup IF	2–0	Frederiksberg BK
Brande IF	1–1 (a.e.t.) (4–5 p)	Haderslev FK
BK Dalgas	2–3	BK Hero
Esbjerg ØB	1–2	Aabyhøj IF
Frederikssund IK	0–2	Knabstrup IF
IF Fuglebakken	0–2	Vorup Frederiksberg BK
Herfølge BK	1–3 (a.e.t.)	Rønne IK
Hjørring IF	3–2	Randers KFUM
Holbæk B&I	8–1	Frem Sakskøbing
Holstebro BK	2–1 (a.e.t.)	Hobro IK
Kastrup BK	4–0	Ullerød GF
Kerteminde BK	2–1	Hørby IF
Kirke Såby IF Thor	1–3 (a.e.t.)	IK Viking Rønne
Korsør BK	4–0	Hagested IF
Nakskov BK	3–3 (a.e.t.) (4–5 p)	Lyngby BK
Rødby fB	0–5	Herlev IF
Silkeborg IF	2–1 (a.e.t.)	Kolding IF
Slagelse B&I	2–1 (a.e.t.)	Fremad Amager
Stoholm IF	3–1 (a.e.t.)	Struer BK
Svendborg fB	0–2	Nyborg G&IF
Tårnby BK	3–2	BK Rødovre
Tårup IF	0–2	Tved BK
BK Velo	1–0	Hellerup IK
Aalborg Chang	4–0	Assens G&IK
Aalborg Freja	5–1	Tarup Paarup IF

== Second round ==
Team 1	Score	Team 2
B 1901	3–3 (a.e.t.) (2–1 p)	Vorup Frederiksberg BK
B 1921	3–2	BK Hero
B 47 Esbjerg	3–3 (a.e.t.) (2–4 p)	Lyngby BK
Ballerup IF	0–2	B.93
Herlev IF	4–0	Kastrup BK
Hjørring IF	1–2	Slagelse B&I
Holbæk B&I	5–0	Kerteminde BK
Horsens fS	3–2 (a.e.t.)	Haderslev FK
Knabstrup IF	3–2 (a.e.t.)	BK Velo
Nyborg G&IF	0–3	Brønshøj BK
Næstved IF	2–3	Viborg FF
Odense KFUM	1–2	Korsør BK
Randers Freja	3–2	Stoholm IF
Rønne IK	3–0	Holstebro BK
Silkeborg IF	4–1	Tårnby BK
Tved BK	3–2	Frederikshavn fI
Vanløse IF	3–1	Aalborg Chang
Vejen SF	5–1	Aalborg Freja
IK Viking Rønne	2–3	Odense BK
Aabyhøj IF	0–5	Ikast FS

== Third round ==
Team 1	Score	Team 2
AB	3–0	Vejen SF
AGF	2–3	Vejle BK
B 1913	1–2	KB
Brønshøj BK	2–0	Rønne IK
Horsens fS	3–0	Esbjerg fB
Hvidovre IF	6–1	Køge BK
Ikast FS	4–0	B 1909 Odense
Korsør BK	1–1 (a.e.t.) (4–2 p)	B 1903
Lyngby BK	2–1	Herlev IF
Odense BK	5–2	Knabstrup IF
Randers Freja	11–1	B 1921
Silkeborg IF	3–2	Holbæk B&I
Slagelse B&I	1–2	B.93
Tved BK	1–3	BK Frem
Vanløse IF	0–3	AaB
Viborg FF	3–1	B 1901

== Fourth round ==
Team 1	Score	Team 2
BK Frem	1–2	Randers Freja
Ikast FS	2–3	KB
Korsør BK	1–3	Brønshøj BK
Lyngby BK	1–3	B.93
Silkeborg IF	1–0	Odense BK
Vejle BK	2–1	AB
Viborg FF	1–4	Hvidovre IF
AaB	2–1	Horsens fS

== Quarter-finals ==
Team 1	Score	Team 2
Brønshøj BK	1–3	B.93
Hvidovre IF	1–2	AaB
Randers Freja	2–1	KB
Silkeborg IF	2–0	Vejle BK

== Semi-finals ==
Team 1	Score	Team 2
B.93	4–5	Randers Freja
Silkeborg IF	0–1	AaB

== Final ==
4 May 1967

Randers Freja	1–0	AaB
Sørensen 30'	Report

Københavns Idrætspark, Copenhagen
Attendance: 13,700
Referee: Arnth Jensen
