= 1972–73 Danish Cup =

Tournament details
- Country: Denmark

Final positions
- Champions: Randers Freja
- Runners-up: B 1901

The 1972–73 Danish Cup was the 19th season of the Danish Cup, the highest football competition in Denmark. The final was played on 31 May 1973.

== First round ==
Team 1	Score	Team 2
B 1908	0–3	Ølstykke FC
B 67 Odense	2–5	Hjørring IF
B.93	4–1	Lyngby BK
Bramming BK	3–2	Middelfart G&BK
Dalum IF	1–3	Glostrup IC
Frederiksberg BK	1–4	Glostrup IF 32
Frem Sakskøbing	2–1	BK Rødovre
Gislinge BK	0–4	Nyborg G&IF
Gentofte-Vangede IF	1–2	Helsingør IF
Holstebro BK	4–1	IK Skovbakken
Houlbjerg-Laurbjerg IF	2–0	BK Marienlyst
Hurup IF	2–4 (a.e.t.)	Frederikshavn fI
Husum BK	6–3	AIK Frederiksholm
Kastrup BK	4–0	Herfølge BK
Kibæk IF	2–1	Stige BK
Kirke Såby IF Thor	1–3 (a.e.t.)	Vanløse IF
Kolding IF	2–1	Fredericia fF
LKB-Gistrup IF	0–6	Aalborg Freja
Nakskov BK	1–2 (a.e.t.)	Hellerup IK
Odense KFUM	5–3	Herning Fremad
Silkeborg BK	3–6	Ikast FS
Suså IF	1–4	Stubbekøbing BK
Taars-Ugilt IF	3–0	Skamby BK
Vester Hæsinge BK	1–2	Skive IK
Viborg FF	4–0	Gråsten BK
IK Viking Rønne	3–0	Svebølle B&I
Vordingborg IF	0–2	KFUM København
Aabenraa BK	8–3	Engesvang BK

== Second round ==
Team 1	Score	Team 2
AB	6–2 (a.e.t.)	Houlbjerg-Laurbjerg IF
B.93	7–3 (a.e.t.)	Vanløse IF
Bramming BK	1–3	Silkeborg IF
Fremad Amager	3–1	KFUM København
IF Fuglebakken	4–3	Frederikshavn fI
Hellerup IK	3–0	Frem Sakskøbing
Hjørring IF	8–1	Viborg FF
Holstebro BK	1–3	Kibæk IF
Horsens fS	1–4	B 1913
Husum BK	1–2	Kastrup BK
Ikast FS	7–1	Kolding IF
Nyborg G&IF	0–1	Glostrup IC
Odense BK	3–4	Skive IK
Odense KFUM	2–0	Taars-Ugilt IF
Slagelse B&I	4–3 (a.e.t.)	Glostrup IF 32
Svendborg fB	5–1	Helsingør IF
IK Viking Rønne	1–2	Stubbekøbing BK
AaB	10–1	Aabenraa BK
Aalborg Freja	3–3 (a.e.t.) (4–5 p)	Esbjerg fB
Ølstykke FC	3–8	Holbæk B&I

== Third round ==
Team 1	Score	Team 2
AB	2–2 (a.e.t.) (5–4 p)	Holbæk B&I
AGF	4–1	B 1909
Brønshøj BK	3–4	Næstved IF
Esbjerg fB	4–1	Skive IK
Fremad Amager	2–3	B.93
Hellerup IK	2–5 (a.e.t.)	B 1901
Hjørring IF	5–2	Odense KFUM
Hvidovre IF	4–1	Glostrup IC
Kastrup BK	2–0	BK Frem
Kibæk IF	1–2	B 1913
Køge BK	3–0	B 1903
Silkeborg IF	4–3	IF Fuglebakken
Slagelse B&I	0–6	Randers Freja
Stubbekøbing BK	1–3	KB
Svendborg fB	3–4 (a.e.t.)	Ikast FS
Vejle BK	6–0	AaB

== Fourth round ==
Team 1	Score	Team 2
AGF	2–1	AB
B 1901	2–1 (a.e.t.)	Hvidovre IF
B 1913	2–2 (a.e.t.) (4–5 p)	Randers Freja
Hjørring IF	4–3	Næstved IF
Kastrup BK	7–1	B.93
KB	1–3	Esbjerg fB
Køge BK	4–2	Ikast FS
Silkeborg IF	3–2	Vejle BK

== Quarter-finals ==
Team 1	Score	Team 2
AGF	4–0	Hjørring IF
B 1901	3–2	Esbjerg fB
Køge BK	3–0	Kastrup BK
Randers Freja	2–0	Silkeborg IF

== Semi-finals ==
Team 1	Score	Team 2
B 1901	1–0 (a.e.t.)	AGF
Køge BK	1–1 (a.e.t.)	Randers Freja

=== Replay ===
Team 1	Score	Team 2
Randers Freja	3–1	Køge BK

== Final ==
31 May 1973

Randers Freja	2–0	B 1901
Brandenborg 17'; Nielsen 47'	Report

Københavns Idrætspark, Copenhagen
Attendance: 21,800
Referee: Kurt Ohlsen
