= 1954–55 Danish Cup =

Tournament details
- Country: Denmark

Final positions
- Champions: AGF
- Runners-up: Aalborg Chang

The 1954–55 Danish Cup was the 1st installment of the Danish Cup, the highest football competition in Denmark. The final was played on 9 June 1955.

== First round ==
Team 1	Score	Team 2
Assens G&IK	3–6	Haderslev FK
IF Skjold Birkerød	5–1	Ringsted IF
Borup IF	3–3 (a.e.t.) (1–2 p)	IK Skovbakken
BK Dalgas	3–2	Nakskov BK
Dannemarre IF	1–2	Husum BK
Fredericia fF	7–2	Rødding IF
FIF Hillerød	4–2	Hedehusene IK
Grindsted G&IF	1–4	Kolding IF
Hammel GF	2–1	Frederikshavn fI
Haslev IF	2–1	Slagelse B&I
Handelsstandes BK	0–3	Svebølle B&I
Hjørring IF	2–1	Silkeborg IF
Holbæk B&I	4–5 (a.e.t.)	BK Mariendal
Kalundborg GB	6–0	BK Hekla
Kastrup BK	5–0	BK Heimdal
Lillerød IF	3–6	Christianshavns IK
BK Marienlyst	2–2 (a.e.t.) (4–5 p)	BK Frem Odense
Nykøbing Mors IF	0–4	Ikast FS
Næsby G&IF	2–4	Rudkøbing BK
Ringkøbing IF	5–0	Grønbjerg IF
Tarp BK	1–3	Dalum IF
BK Thor	5–3	Langeskov IF
Toreby-Grænge BK	2–4	Nexø BK
Tårnby BK	1–1 (a.e.t.) (2–4 p)	BK Rødovre
Vejgaard BSK	4–1	Nørresundby BK
Vordingborg IF	4–3	Lyngby BK
Vorup Frederiksberg BK	3–1	Hobro BK

== Second round ==
Team 1	Score	Team 2
Christianshavns IK	3–2	Fredericia fF
FIF Hillerød	1–2	Viby IF
BK Frem Odense	1–6	IK Viking Rønne
Haderslev FK	0–2	Frederiksberg BK
Hjørring IF	1–2	Vorup Frederiksberg BK
Ikast FS	6–2	IF Skjold Birkerød
BK Mariendal	3–0	Haslev IF
Nexø BK	4–2	BK Thor
Ringkøbing IF	2–3 (a.e.t.)	Kalundborg GB
Rudkøbing BK	3–5	Kastrup BK
BK Rødovre	1–2	Hammel GF
IK Skovbakken	6–1	Husum BK
Svebølle B&I	3–4 (a.e.t.)	Dalum IF
Vejgaard BSK	2–3 (a.e.t.)	BK Dalgas
Viborg FF	2–1	Svendborg BK
Vordingborg IF	2–4	Kolding IF

== Third round ==
Team 1	Score	Team 2
Brønshøj BK	0–2	Ikast FS
BK Dalgas	2–3 (a.e.t.)	Hammel GF
Dalum IF	0–2	Vejen SF
Kalundborg GB	1–1 (a.e.t.) (4–2 p)	B 1921
Kastrup BK	1–5	Horsens fS
Kolding IF	1–3	Aalborg Chang
Lendemark BK	1–0	Fremad Amager
BK Mariendal	1–5	Frederiksberg BK
Nexø BK	1–2 (a.e.t.)	B 1901
Odense KFUM	2–1	KFUM København
Randers Freja	4–2	IK Skovbakken
Vanløse IF	3–2	Hellerup IK
Viborg FF	4–3	Christianshavns IK
Viby IF	5–0	Brande IF
IK Viking Rønne	1–2	Nyborg G&IF
Vorup Frederiksberg BK	1–5	Helsingør IF

== Fourth round ==
Team 1	Score	Team 2
AB	3–1	B 1903
B.93	3–2	Horsens fS
B 1901	0–4	KB
B 1909	2–0	B 1913
Frederiksberg BK	2–1 (a.e.t.)	IF AIA-Tranbjerg
Hammel GF	1–7	BK Frem
Ikast FS	4–3 (a.e.t.)	Esbjerg fB
Kalundborg GB	1–0	Nyborg G&IF
Køge BK	0–1	AGF
Odense BK	8–2	Lendemark BK
Randers Freja	3–2	Vejle BK
Skovshoved IF	4–1	Odense KFUM
Vanløse IF	3–0	Helsingør IF
Viborg FF	2–1	AaB
Viby IF	3–2	Vejen SF
Aalborg Chang	5–3 (a.e.t.)	Næstved IF

== Fifth round ==
Team 1	Score	Team 2
AB	4–1	Ikast FS
Frederiksberg BK	0–4	Vanløse IF
BK Frem	0–3	AGF
Odense BK	13–1	Kalundborg GB
Randers Freja	2–0	B.93
Viby IF	2–1	KB
Viborg FF	1–0	Skovshoved IF
Aalborg Chang	3–2	B 1909

== Quarter-finals ==
Team 1	Score	Team 2
AB	0–2	Vanløse IF
AGF	2–1 (a.e.t.)	Randers Freja
Viborg FF	2–3	Aalborg Chang
Viby IF	1–2	Odense BK

== Semi-finals ==
Team 1	Score	Team 2
AGF	3–1 (a.e.t.)	Odense BK
Aalborg Chang	1–0	Vanløse IF

== Final ==
9 June 1955

AGF	4–0	Aalborg Chang
Bjerregaard 54', 86'; Pilgaard 60'; Jensen 77'	Report

Københavns Idrætspark, Copenhagen
Attendance: 10,300
Referee: Helge Andersen
