= 1975–76 Danish Cup =

Tournament details
- Country: Denmark

Final positions
- Champions: Esbjerg fB
- Runners-up: Holbæk B&I

The 1975–76 Danish Cup was the 22nd season of the Danish Cup, the highest football competition in Denmark. The final was played on 27 May 1976.

== First round ==
Team 1	Score	Team 2
B 1921	2–2 (a.e.t.) (6–5 p)	Ballerup IF
B 47 Esbjerg	1–0	Tarp BK
Borup IF	0–7	Herfølge BK
Brønderslev IF	1–5	B 1913
Bække SF	1–5	Vejgaard BSK
Dragør BK	0–4	Toksværd Olstrup Fodbold
Fjordager IF	1–4	Frederikshavn fI
FIF Hillerød	2–3	Nakskov BK
Glostrup IC	5–1	Brønshøj BK
Helsingør IF	4–1	Rødby fB
Herlev IF	2–2 (a.e.t.) (3–1 p)	Jyderup BK
BK Hero	5–1	BK Union
Herstedøster IC	0–5	Vordingborg IF
Kibæk IF	1–1 (a.e.t.) (2–4 p)	Holstebro BK
Lyngby BK	6–2	Korsør BK
Middelfart G&BK	2–2 (a.e.t.) (3–1 p)	Lumby IF
Nørre Alslev BK	2–4	Kastrup BK
Krogsbølle-Roerslev FK	1–2	Haderslev FK
Rudkøbing BK	5–4	Mørke IF
BK Rødovre	1–0	Husum BK
Skovshoved IF	4–0	Klemensker IF
Svendborg fB	5–1	Langtved SG&IF
Sønderhald IF	1–4	Assens FC
Thisted FC	1–3	Aalborg Freja
BK Vebro	1–1 (a.e.t.) (6–7 p)	Frederiksberg BK
Viborg FF	3–1 (a.e.t.)	Ikast FS
Vorup Frederiksberg BK	2–1	Vivild IF
Aalborg Chang	1–0	Støvring IF

== Second round ==
Team 1	Score	Team 2
Assens FC	0–3	B 47 Esbjerg
B 1913	1–3	Horsens fS
B 1921	3–2	Nakskov BK
B.93	5–0	Skovshoved IF
Frederiksberg BK	0–5	Herfølge BK
Fremad Amager	6–2	Lyngby BK
IF Hasle Fuglebakken	2–0	B 1909
Haderslev FK	2–6	AGF
Helsingør IF	3–1	BK Rødovre
BK Hero	2–1	Glostrup IC
Ikast FS	2–3	Esbjerg fB
Kastrup BK	1–0	AB
Middelfart G&BK	2–4	Frederikshavn fI
Odense BK	5–3	Holstebro BK
Rudkøbing BK	4–4 (a.e.t.) (3–4 p)	Vordingborg IF
Silkeborg IF	3–4	Aalborg Freja
Svendborg fB	3–0	Herlev IF
Toksværd Olstrup Fodbold	0–2	Hvidovre IF
Aabenraa BK	3–1	Vejgaard BSK
Aalborg Chang	1–0	Vorup Frederiksberg BK

== Third round ==
Team 1	Score	Team 2
AGF	3–0	Svendborg fB
B 1903	4–0	Horsens fS
B 47 Esbjerg	3–1	B 1921
Esbjerg fB	2–2	B 1901
Frederikshavn fI	3–1 (a.e.t.)	Køge BK
IF Hasle Fuglebakken	2–0	B.93
Helsingør IF	0–1	BK Frem
Holbæk B&I	3–0	Aalborg Freja
Hvidovre IF	5–2	BK Hero
Odense BK	8–5 (a.e.t.)	Fremad Amager
Vanløse IF	5–3 (a.e.t.)	Slagelse B&I
Vejle BK	4–2	Randers Freja
Vordingborg IF	2–8	Næstved IF
AaB	2–0	Herfølge BK
Aabenraa BK	1–2	Kastrup BK
Aalborg Chang	0–2	KB

== Fourth round ==
Team 1	Score	Team 2
B 1903	1–2	Næstved IF
B 47 Esbjerg	0–4	Frederikshavn fI
BK Frem	1–2	Esbjerg fB
Holbæk B&I	4–1	AGF
Kastrup BK	2–1	Vanløse IF
KB	6–1	IF Hasle Fuglebakken
Odense BK	2–0	Hvidovre IF
AaB	0–2	Vejle BK

== Quarter-finals ==
Team 1	Score	Team 2
Frederikshavn fI	4–1 (a.e.t.)	KB
Odense BK	0–2	Holbæk B&I
Kastrup BK	3–1	Næstved IF
Vejle BK	3–3 (a.e.t.) (0–3 p)	Esbjerg fB

== Semi-finals ==
Team 1	Score	Team 2
Esbjerg fB	1–0	Frederikshavn fI
Kastrup BK	0–2	Holbæk B&I

== Final ==
27 May 1976

Esbjerg fB	2–1	Holbæk B&I
Iversen 10'; Østergaard 40'	Report 1 Report 2	Jørgensen 35' (pen.)

Københavns Idrætspark, Copenhagen
Attendance: 23,550
Referee: Henning Lund-Sørensen
