= 1980–81 Danish Cup =

Tournament details
- Country: Denmark

Final positions
- Champions: Vejle BK
- Runners-up: BK Frem

The 1980–81 Danish Cup was the 27th season of the Danish Cup, the highest football competition in Denmark. The final was played on 28 May 1981.

== First round ==
Team 1	Score	Team 2
IF AIA-Tranbjerg	1–0 (a.e.t.)	Vejlby-Risskov IK
Asnæs BK	0–5	Vordingborg IF
Assens FC	1–5	Randers Freja
B 1909	0–1	Horsens fS
Bramming BK	0–1	B 67 Odense
BK Dalgas	1–4	Hørsholm-Usserød IK
Dragør BK	5–0	BK Skjold Østerbro
BK Fremad Valby	3–6	Herfølge BK
Gladsaxe-Hero BK	2–1	Store Merløse IF
Haderslev FK	1–4	Frederikshavn fI
Hellas BK Valby	0–1	Kalundborg GB
Helsingør IF	2–0	IK Viking Rønne
Herlev IF	1–0	Hellerup IK
Hjørring IF	5–0	Varde IF
Holstebro BK	4–2	OKS
IF Hasle Fuglebakken	3–1	Viby IF
KFUM København	2–1	Nordfalster FB
Kolding IF	2–1	Aalborg Freja
Maribo BK	1–6	Glostrup IC
Næsby BK	0–0 (a.e.t.) (1–2 p)	Støvring IF
Politiets IF	1–5	B 1921
Roskilde BK	0–1	Brønshøj BK
Skive IK	3–1 (a.e.t.)	Glamsbjerg IF
Svendborg fB	0–2	Nakskov BK
Ulbjerg IF	1–5	Herning Fremad
Vipperød BK	2–5	IF Skjold Birkerød
Vojens BK	5–3	Brønderslev IF
Aarslev BK	0–2	B 1913

== Second round ==
Team 1	Score	Team 2
AB	2–1	Hørsholm-Usserød IK
B 67 Odense	0–6	B 1913
B 1901	3–2	Støvring IF
B 1921	2–2 (a.e.t.) (2–4 p)	Køge BK
B.93	3–0	Kalundborg GB
IF Skjold Birkerød	1–0	Vordingborg IF
Brøndby IF	1–1 (a.e.t.) (4–2 p)	Lyngby BK
Brønshøj BK	1–0	Herlev IF
Dragør BK	3–5 (a.e.t.)	Gladsaxe-Hero BK
Fremad Amager	8–1	Vanløse IF
Glostrup IC	5–0	KFUM København
Helsingør IF	2–4	Herfølge BK
Hjørring IF	1–0	Skive IK
Holstebro BK	3–0	Vojens BK
Horsens fS	0–1	Herning Fremad
Kolding IF	3–2	IF Hasle Fuglebakken
Randers Freja	2–1	Frederikshavn fI
IK Skovbakken	1–2	IF AIA-Tranbjerg
Slagelse B&I	0–3	Nakskov BK
Viborg FF	0–1	Holbæk B&I

== Third round ==
Team 1	Score	Team 2
AGF	2–0	Ikast FS
IF AIA-Tranbjerg	0–5	Herning Fremad
B 1901	3–0	Brøndby IF
B 1913	2–0	Hjørring IF
B.93	0–2	KB
Brønshøj BK	2–1	Holstebro BK
Fremad Amager	3–1	Randers Freja
Glostrup IC	2–4	Herfølge BK
Hvidovre IF	3–1	IF Skjold Birkerød
Kastrup BK	2–3	BK Frem
Kolding IF	0–1	B 1903
Køge BK	3–2	Gladsaxe-Hero BK
Nakskov BK	3–5	AB
Næstved IF	3–0	AaB
Odense BK	1–1 (a.e.t.) (2–3 p)	Holbæk B&I
Vejle BK	3–0	Esbjerg fB

== Fourth round ==
Team 1	Score	Team 2
AGF	3–2	B 1903
B 1901	2–3 (a.e.t.)	Vejle BK
Brønshøj BK	1–2	BK Frem
Fremad Amager	2–0	Hvidovre IF
Herfølge BK	1–5	Næstved IF
Herning Fremad	2–0	B 1913
KB	5–0	AB
Køge BK	2–1	Holbæk B&I

== Quarter-finals ==
Team 1	Score	Team 2
AGF	2–6	KB
Fremad Amager	0–1	BK Frem
Køge BK	2–2 (a.e.t.) (4–5 p)	Vejle BK
Næstved IF	1–0	Herning Fremad

== Semi-finals ==
Team 1	Score	Team 2
BK Frem	3–1	KB
Næstved IF	0–0 (a.e.t.)	Vejle BK

=== Replay ===
Team 1	Score	Team 2
Vejle BK	2–1	Næstved IF

== Final ==
28 May 1981

Vejle BK	2–1	BK Frem
Thychosen 35'; Rasmussen 59' (o.g.)	Report	Dam 14'

Københavns Idrætspark, Copenhagen
Attendance: 17,500
Referee: Jørgen Mortensen
