= 1979–80 Danish Cup =

Tournament details
- Country: Denmark

Final positions
- Champions: Hvidovre IF
- Runners-up: Lyngby BK

The 1979–80 Danish Cup was the 26th season of the Danish Cup, the highest football competition in Denmark. The final was played on 15 May 1980.

== First round ==
Team 1	Score	Team 2
AB	7–1	Allinge-Sandvig GF
B 1908 Amager	0–3	Brøndby IF
B 1909	4–2	Nørresundby BK
Brændekilde-Bellinge BK	2–4	IF Hasle Fuglebakken
Esbjerg ØB	2–0	IF AIA-Tranbjerg
Frem Sakskøbing	2–2 (a.e.t.) (3–5 p)	Greve IF
BK Fremad Valby	7–1	BK Hekla
Glostrup IC	0–2	Roskilde BK
Helsingør IF	2–1	Gentofte-Vangede IF
Herfølge BK	1–0	Skovlunde Fodbold
Herning Fremad	5–2	Aabenraa BK
Gladsaxe-Hero BK	0–2	BK Avarta
Hellerup IK	2–1	Østerbros Boldklub
Horsens fS	5–1	Brande IF
Hvalsø IF	0–1	Vordingborg IF
Højslev Station IF	0–1	Skamby BK
Hørsholm-Usserød IK	2–2 (a.e.t.) (3–5 p)	Husum BK
Kastrup BK	3–0	Maribo BK
Kolding IF	7–2	Dronningborg IF
Korsør BK	0–5	Espergærde IF
Langeskov IF	3–2	Galten FS
Næsby BK	3–2	Farsø/Ullits IK
Odense KFUM	3–1	Lindholm IF
Søllested IF	2–3	Brønshøj BK
Ulbølle Fodbold	2–1	Tarp BK
Vejen SF	1–2 (a.e.t.)	B 1913
Viborg FF	2–0	Nørre Aaby IK
Aalborg Freja	3–0	Thisted FC

== Second round ==
Team 1	Score	Team 2
AB	2–1	Køge BK
BK Avarta	1–3	Brøndby IF
B 1909	5–0	Knabstrup IF
Esbjerg ØB	6–2	Ulbølle Fodbold
Frederikshavn fI	1–2 (a.e.t.)	Odense KFUM
Fremad Amager	1–2	Lyngby BK
Herfølge BK	3–1	Espergærde IF
Herning Fremad	1–2	IF Hasle Fuglebakken
Hellerup IK	1–3 (a.e.t.)	Roskilde BK
Holbæk B&I	4–1	Brønshøj BK
Hvidovre IF	5–1	Husum BK
Ikast FS	3–1	AaB
Langeskov IF	1–4	B 1913
Nakskov BK	3–0	Skamby BK
Næsby BK	0–1	Kolding IF
Næstved IF	4–3	BK Fremad Valby
Randers Freja	2–1	Aalborg Freja
Vanløse IF	4–1	Helsingør IF
Viborg FF	1–0	Horsens fS
Vordingborg IF	3–2	Greve IF

== Third round ==
Team 1	Score	Team 2
AB	2–1	Herfølge BK
AGF	3–1	Nakskov BK
B 1901	3–4 (a.e.t.)	Næstved IF
B 1903	8–1	Odense KFUM
B 1909	2–1	Vordingborg IF
B.93	1–1 (a.e.t.) (5–4 p)	Brøndby IF
Esbjerg fB	4–0	Roskilde BK
Esbjerg ØB	0–2	Odense BK
BK Frem	0–4	Holbæk B&I
KB	6–0	IF Hasle Fuglebakken
Kolding IF	2–2 (a.e.t.) (3–2 p)	B 1913
Lyngby BK	3–2 (a.e.t.)	Ikast FS
Randers Freja	0–1	Vanløse IF
IK Skovbakken	1–3	Hvidovre IF
Vejle BK	3–1	Kastrup BK
Viborg FF	4–0	Slagelse B&I

== Fourth round ==
Team 1	Score	Team 2
AB	2–1	Viborg FF
AGF	3–0	Odense BK
B.93	1–3	KB
Hvidovre IF	2–1	B 1903
Kolding IF	2–3	Esbjerg fB
Lyngby BK	5–1	B 1909
Næstved IF	1–2	Vejle BK
Vanløse IF	2–8	Holbæk B&I

== Quarter-finals ==
Team 1	Score	Team 2
AB	1–2	Holbæk B&I
Hvidovre IF	3–2	Esbjerg fB
KB	1–2	Lyngby BK
Vejle BK	3–2	AGF

== Semi-finals ==
Team 1	Score	Team 2
Hvidovre IF	4–0	Holbæk B&I
Lyngby BK	4–1	Vejle BK

== Final ==
15 May 1980

Hvidovre IF	5–3	Lyngby BK
Ziegler 18'; Gapiński 30'; Manniche 50', 78'; Christensen 73' (pen.)	Report	Hansen 23', 43'; Petersen 80' (pen.)

Københavns Idrætspark, Copenhagen
Attendance: 23,500
Referee: Ib Nielsen
