= 1969–70 Danish Cup =

Tournament details
- Country: Denmark

Final positions
- Champions: AaB
- Runners-up: Lyngby BK

The 1969–70 Danish Cup was the 16th season of the Danish Cup, the highest football competition in Denmark. The final was played on 7 May 1970.

== First round ==
| Team 1 | Score | Team 2 |
|---|---|---|
| IF AIA-Tranbjerg | 1–4 (a.e.t.) | Aabenraa BK |
| B.93 | 2–1 | BK Fremad Valby |
| Ballerup IF | 1–0 | Gørlev IF |
| Dragør BK | 1–2 | BK Avarta |
| Døllefjelde-Musse IF | 2–4 | Toksværd Olstrup Fodbold |
| Frederiksberg BK | 3–0 | Brøndby IF |
| Frem Sakskøbing | 2–3 | B 1921 |
| Herning Fremad | 4–0 | Svendborg fB |
| Hellerup IK | 1–2 | Rønne IK |
| Højslev Station IF | 2–1 | Bolbro G&IF |
| Kalundborg GB | 2–3 (a.e.t.) | BK Rødovre |
| Karup-Kølvrå IK | 2–6 | Vorup Frederiksberg BK |
| Kolding BK | 5–0 | Jydsk Akademisk IF |
| Nakskov BK | 0–2 | Lyngby BK |
| Nørresundby BK | 1–4 | Vejen SF |
| Nyborg G&IF | 2–1 | Fremad Amager |
| Næsby BK | 6–3 | IF Fuglebakken |
| Odense KFUM | 1–2 | Frederikshavn fI |
| Politiets IF | 0–3 | Helsingør IF |
| Roslev IK | 7–1 | BK Stjernen |
| IK Skovbakken | 3–4 (a.e.t.) | Aalborg Chang |
| BK Stefan | 0–6 | Herfølge BK |
| Struer BK | 2–3 | Taars-Ugilt IF |
| Varde BK | 1–3 | Nørre Aaby IK |
| BK Vestia | 3–4 (a.e.t.) | Menstrup-Spjellerup IF |
| Viborg FF | 4–1 | Allested U&IF |
| Viby IF | 0–4 | Holstebro BK |
| Østerbros Boldklub | 4–2 (a.e.t.) | Husum BK |

== Second round ==
| Team 1 | Score | Team 2 |
|---|---|---|
| AGF | 0–1 | Køge BK |
| BK Avarta | 2–1 | Vanløse IF |
| B.93 | 0–1 | Silkeborg IF |
| Frederiksberg BK | 1–0 | Rønne IK |
| Frederikshavn fI | 4–2 | Taars-Ugilt IF |
| Herfølge BK | 1–0 | B 1921 |
| Holbæk B&I | 3–2 | Aabenraa BK |
| Holstebro BK | 1–4 | Ballerup IF |
| Højslev Station IF | 0–2 | Brønshøj BK |
| Ikast FS | 5–0 | Vejen SF |
| Kolding BK | 1–9 | Helsingør IF |
| Lyngby BK | 2–1 | Vorup Frederiksberg BK |
| Nørre Aaby IK | 4–3 | Odense BK |
| Nyborg G&IF | 2–1 | Herning Fremad |
| Næsby BK | 2–1 | Kolding IF |
| Næstved IF | 3–2 | Toksværd Olstrup Fodbold |
| Randers Freja | 0–2 | Slagelse B&I |
| Roslev IK | 0–6 | Viborg FF |
| BK Rødovre | 5–1 | Østerbros Boldklub |
| Aalborg Chang | 8–1 | Menstrup-Spjellerup IF |

== Third round ==
| Team 1 | Score | Team 2 |
|---|---|---|
| BK Avarta | 0–4 | AB |
| Esbjerg fB | 2–1 | B 1913 |
| Frederiksberg BK | 3–0 | Køge BK |
| BK Frem | 6–2 | Nørre Aaby IK |
| Helsingør IF | 2–0 | Brønshøj BK |
| Herfølge BK | 4–3 | B 1901 |
| Holbæk B&I | 6–3 (a.e.t.) | Vejle BK |
| Horsens fS | 2–1 | Aalborg Chang |
| Hvidovre IF | 1–2 | B 1903 |
| Ikast FS | 4–1 | BK Rødovre |
| KB | 3–3 (a.e.t.) (3–2 p) | Frederikshavn fI |
| Lyngby BK | 4–0 | B 1909 |
| Næsby BK | 1–1 (a.e.t.) (4–3 p) | Silkeborg IF |
| Næstved IF | 0–0 (a.e.t.) (3–2 p) | Viborg FF |
| Nyborg G&IF | 2–3 (a.e.t.) | Ballerup IF |
| Slagelse B&I | 0–1 | AaB |

== Fourth round ==
| Team 1 | Score | Team 2 |
|---|---|---|
| AB | 1–3 | AaB |
| Herfølge BK | 1–2 | Horsens fS |
| Holbæk B&I | 1–3 | Helsingør IF |
| Ikast FS | 2–0 | Esbjerg fB |
| KB | 1–2 | B 1903 |
| Lyngby BK | 1–1 (a.e.t.) (4–3 p) | BK Frem |
| Næsby BK | 2–5 | Frederiksberg BK |
| Næstved IF | 2–1 | Ballerup IF |

== Quarter-finals ==
| Team 1 | Score | Team 2 |
|---|---|---|
| Horsens fS | 3–1 | Frederiksberg BK |
| Ikast FS | 2–1 | B 1903 |
| Lyngby BK | 1–0 | Helsingør IF |
| AaB | 4–2 | Næstved IF |

== Semi-finals ==
| Team 1 | Score | Team 2 |
|---|---|---|
| Horsens fS | 0–3 | AaB |
| Lyngby BK | 1–0 | Ikast FS |

== Final ==
7 May 1970

| AaB | 2–1 | Lyngby BK |
|---|---|---|
| Bach 72', 86' | Report | Sørensen 84' (pen.) |

Københavns Idrætspark, Copenhagen
Attendance: 18,200
Referee: Preben Christoffersen
