= 1981–82 Danish Cup =

Tournament details
- Country: Denmark

Final positions
- Champions: B.93
- Runners-up: B 1903

The 1981–82 Danish Cup was the 28th season of the Danish Cup, the highest football competition in Denmark. The original match of the final, played on 20 May, ended in a 3–3 draw. The champion was decided in the replay, which was played on 9 June 1982.

== First round ==
Team 1	Score	Team 2
BK Avarta	1–0	Dragør BK
B 1913	2–2 (a.e.t.) (5–4 p)	Kolding BK
Brønshøj BK	1–0	BK Vebro
Bramming BK	1–0	Hejnsvig IF
Dalum IF	1–0	Lumby IF
Fredericia KFUM	1–0	Nykøbing Mors IF
Frederikshavn fI	3–1 (a.e.t.)	Horsens fS
AIK Frederiksholm	2–4	Roskilde BK
Glamsbjerg IF	6–1	Tved BK
Glostrup IC	5–3	Helsingør IF
Hørsholm-Usserød IK	7–3	IK Viking Rønne
Hedehusene IK	2–4	Stubbekøbing BK
Hellerup IK	7–2	BK Stefan
Hjørring IF	2–1 (a.e.t.)	Bindslev IF
Holstebro BK	2–5	SUB Ullerslev
Husum BK	0–2	IF Skjold Birkerød
Jyderup BK	2–1	Ballerup IF
OKS	2–0	Nørresundby BK
Randers Freja	1–0	Thisted FC
IK Skovbakken	3–0	Tommerup BK
Skovshoved IF	0–4	B 1901
Slagelse B&I	1–0	Kammeraternes BK
Tingsted BK	0–4	Høng GF
Vanløse IF	6–2	Frem Sakskøbing
Vivild IF	1–3	Silkeborg IF
Vordingborg IF	1–3	Holbæk B&I
Aabenraa BK	2–3	IF AIA-Tranbjerg
Aarslev BK	4–3	Aalborg Freja

== Second round ==
Team 1	Score	Team 2
B 1901	6–0	IK Skovbakken
B 1913	1–0	Randers Freja
Brøndby IF	3–0	AB
Dalum IF	1–0	IF AIA-Tranbjerg
Frederikshavn fI	4–1	Silkeborg IF
BK Frem	4–2	Høng GF
Fremad Amager	2–0	IF Skjold Birkerød
Herfølge BK	2–1	Roskilde BK
Herning Fremad	7–2	Glamsbjerg IF
Hellerup IK	4–3	Slagelse B&I
Holbæk B&I	2–1	Glostrup IC
Jyderup BK	0–2	BK Avarta
Kastrup BK	3–0	Vanløse IF
Kolding IF	1–0	B 1909 Odense
B 1901	0–3	Brønshøj BK
Stubbekøbing BK	2–3 (a.e.t.)	Hørsholm-Usserød IK
SUB Ullerslev	1–5	Hjørring IF
Viborg FF	3–2	Bramming BK
AaB	3–1	Fredericia KFUM
Aarslev BK	3–2	OKS

== Third round ==
Team 1	Score	Team 2
B 1901	1–2	Ikast FS
B 1903	4–2 (a.e.t.)	BK Frem
Dalum IF	2–2 (a.e.t.) (5–2 p)	B 1913
Frederikshavn fI	2–4 (a.e.t.)	Brøndby IF
Hørsholm-Usserød IK	0–1	Næstved IF
Herfølge BK	2–1 (a.e.t.)	Hellerup IK
Herning Fremad	3–2 (a.e.t.)	Brønshøj BK
Hjørring IF	3–5	Aarslev BK
Holbæk B&I	3–2 (a.e.t.)	Esbjerg fB
Køge BK	1–2	B.93
Kastrup BK	3–1	Fremad Amager
KB	0–6	AGF
Lyngby BK	4–1	Kolding IF
Odense BK	0–1	Vejle BK
Viborg FF	1–1 (a.e.t.) (5–3 p)	Hvidovre IF
AaB	2–2 (a.e.t.) (3–5 p)	BK Avarta

== Fourth round ==
Team 1	Score	Team 2
BK Avarta	2–1	Brøndby IF
B 1903	3–1	Herning Fremad
Dalum IF	1–3	Næstved IF
Herfølge BK	2–2 (a.e.t.) (4–1 p)	Kastrup BK
Ikast FS	1–2	B.93
Vejle BK	2–1	AGF
Viborg FF	2–0	Lyngby BK
Aarslev BK	3–5 (a.e.t.)	Holbæk B&I

== Quarter-finals ==
Team 1	Score	Team 2
BK Avarta	1–0	Holbæk B&I
B.93	2–1	Næstved IF
Herfølge BK	0–1	B 1903
Viborg FF	2–3	Vejle BK

== Semi-finals ==
Team 1	Score	Team 2
B.93	3–0	BK Avarta
B 1903	1–0	Vejle BK

== Final ==
=== Regulation Game ===
20 May 1982

B.93	3–3 (a.e.t.)	B 1903
Madsen 75', 105'; Osbæck 83'	Report	Schøne 61'; Larsen 90' (pen.); Olsen 108'

Københavns Idrætspark, Copenhagen
Attendance: 7,600
Referee: Per Frickmann

=== Replay ===
9 June 1982

B.93	1–0	B 1903
Nørager 86'	Report

Københavns Idrætspark, Copenhagen
Attendance: 5,300
Referee: Ole Amundsen
