= 1959–60 Danish Cup =

Tournament details
- Country: Denmark

Final positions
- Champions: AGF
- Runners-up: Frem Sakskøbing

The 1959–60 Danish Cup was the 6th installment of the Danish Cup, the highest football competition in Denmark. The final was played on 15 May 1960.

== First round ==
Team 1	Score	Team 2
Assens G&IK	0–1	Odense KFUM
B 1921	0–4	Helsingør IF
Bindslev IF	1–5	Silkeborg IF
Brande IF	2–0	Vejgaard BSK
Eskilstrup BK	1–7	Lendemark BK
Frederiksberg BK	4–4 (a.e.t.) (3–2 p)	BK Skjold Østerbro
Fredericia fF	6–1	BK Marienlyst
Frederiksborg IF	3–2	Sundby BK
Frem Sakskøbing	6–3	Slagelse B&I
Hedehusene IK	1–4 (a.e.t.)	Roskilde BK
Hellerup IK	3–0	Tårnby BK
Hjørring IF	6–1	Grindsted G&IF
Holbæk B&I	1–0 (a.e.t.)	Lyngby BK
Horbelev BK	5–4	BK Hekla
Kalundborg GB	3–0	Thisted FC
Kastrup BK	5–2	IF Skjold Birkerød
Kerteminde BK	1–3	Kolding IF
Nakskov BK	4–1	Rødby fB
Nordenskov IF	1–3	Dalum IF
Ringsted IF	0–1	Ryvang FC
BK Rødovre	5–2	B 1908
Skive IK	2–4	IK Skovbakken
Svendborg BK	2–4	Haderslev FK
Vanløse IF	5–1	Nexø BK
Viborg FF	8–0	Tommerup BK
Viby IF	1–2	Ranum IF
Aalborg Chang	1–1 (a.e.t.) (3–4 p)	Herning Fremad
Aalborg Freja	8–1	Søndersø BK

== Second round ==
Team 1	Score	Team 2
B 1901	2–1	Ranum IF
Dalum IF	2–2 (a.e.t.) (3–1 p)	IK Skovbakken
Fredericia BK	1–2	Horbelev BK
Frederikshavn fI	1–3	Brønshøj BK
Frem Sakskøbing	3–3 (a.e.t.) (4–2 p)	KFUM København
Haderslev FK	2–1	Holbæk B&I
Helsingør IF	3–2	B 1913
Hellerup IK	2–1	Frederiksborg IF
Hjørring IF	1–0	Randers Freja
Kalundborg GB	3–1	Aalborg Freja
Kolding IF	2–2 (a.e.t.) (3–1 p)	Herning Fremad
Lendemark BK	1–2	IF AIA-Tranbjerg
Nakskov BK	0–0 (a.e.t.) (5–4 p)	Horsens fS
Næstved IF	4–2 (a.e.t.)	Viborg FF
Odense KFUM	8–1	Kastrup BK
Roskilde BK	2–3	Vanløse IF
Ryvang FC	1–2	Fremad Amager
BK Rødovre	6–2	Brande IF
Silkeborg IF	3–2	Frederiksberg BK
AaB	1–3	Ikast FS

== Third round ==
Team 1	Score	Team 2
IF AIA-Tranbjerg	2–3 (a.e.t.)	AGF
B 1901	5–1	Næstved IF
B 1909	7–0	Fremad Amager
Brønshøj BK	1–1 (a.e.t.) (2–3 p)	Vejle BK
Dalum IF	1–0	Helsingør IF
Esbjerg fB	2–0	B 1903
Haderslev FK	3–3 (a.e.t.) (2–4 p)	Frem Sakskøbing
Hjørring IF	3–1	Vanløse IF
Horbelev BK	1–5 (a.e.t.)	B.93
Ikast FS	1–1 (a.e.t.) (4–3 p)	Hellerup IK
Kolding IF	5–1	Silkeborg IF
Køge BK	2–1	Kalundborg GB
Nakskov BK	1–2	Odense KFUM
Odense BK	4–2	Kjøbenhavns Boldklub
BK Rødovre	2–4	BK Frem
Skovshoved IF	2–1	AB Gladsaxe

== Fourth round ==
Team 1	Score	Team 2
AGF	6–1	Dalum IF
B.93	4–2	Kolding IF
B 1901	2–0	Hjørring IF
B 1909	9–2	Ikast FS
Esbjerg fB	1–0	Odense BK
BK Frem	3–3 (a.e.t.) (4–3 p)	Odense KFUM
Skovshoved IF	0–1	Frem Sakskøbing
Vejle BK	2–0	Køge BK

== Quarter-finals ==
Team 1	Score	Team 2
AGF	2–1	Vejle BK
B.93	3–3 (a.e.t.) (2–4 p)	B 1901
BK Frem	2–3	B 1909
Frem Sakskøbing	3–1	Esbjerg fB

== Semi-finals ==
Team 1	Score	Team 2
AGF	2–2 (a.e.t.)	B 1909
Frem Sakskøbing	1–1 (a.e.t.)	B 1901

=== Replay ===
Team 1	Score	Team 2
B 1901	0–2	Frem Sakskøbing
AGF	1–1 (a.e.t.)	B 1909

=== Second Replay ===
Team 1	Score	Team 2
AGF	2–0	B 1909

== Final ==
15 May 1960

AGF	2–0	Frem Sakskøbing
Nielsen 49'; Amidsen 80'	Report

Københavns Idrætspark, Copenhagen
Attendance: 17,500
Referee: Aage Poulsen
