= 1977–78 Danish Cup =

Tournament details
- Country: Denmark

Final positions
- Champions: BK Frem
- Runners-up: Esbjerg fB

The 1977–78 Danish Cup was the 24th season of the Danish Cup, the highest football competition in Denmark. The original match of the final, played on 4 May, ended in a 1–1. The first replay, played on 8 June, was also a draw with the same score. The second replay, on 9 August 1978, also ended with the scores level at 1–1 in the regulation time, when the winner was decided on penalties.

== First round ==
Team 1	Score	Team 2
AB	4–0	Østerbros Boldklub
Asnæs BK	1–0	Gentofte-Vangede IF
Auning IF	5–4 (a.e.t.)	Bramming BK
BK Avarta	2–3	Brønshøj BK
B 1913	7–4 (a.e.t.)	Hirtshals BK
IF Skjold Birkerød	3–5 (a.e.t.)	Lyngby BK
Gadstrup IF	3–0	Tårnby BK
Glostrup IC	1–0 (a.e.t.)	Ballerup IF
Helsingør IF	4–0	BK Dalgas
Husum BK	3–1	Greve IF
Ikast FS	3–3 (a.e.t.) (4–5 p)	Tarp BK
Jyderup BK	3–1	Sundby BK
Kerteminde BK	2–0	Glejbjerg SF
Kolding IF	4–1	Starup UIF
Nørre Aaby IK	0–4	IK Skovbakken
Odder IGF	1–1 (a.e.t.) (4–3 p)	Stadil/Vedersø IF
Odense KFUM	6–3	Faaborg B&I
Rudkøbing BK	4–2	BK Rødovre
Rødby fB	1–0 (a.e.t.)	Hellerup IK
Rønne IK	3–3 (a.e.t.) (3–5 p)	Frederikssund IK
Sebber IF	2–4	Skamby BK
Stege-Lendemark IF	3–5	Stubbekøbing BK
Svendborg fB	1–1 (a.e.t.) (4–5 p)	Støvring IF
Søllested IF	0–8	Valby BK
Viborg FF	1–0	Silkeborg IF
Aabenraa BK	1–2	Holstebro BK
Aabyhøj IF	6–1	Bangsbo Freja
Aalborg Chang	0–1	Horsens fS

== Second round ==
Team 1	Score	Team 2
AB	1–2	Vanløse IF
B 1913	5–1	Tarp BK
KB	0–3	Næstved IF
Frederikshavn fI	3–2	AGF
Fremad Amager	2–0	Hvidovre IF
Gadstrup IF	1–7	Helsingør IF
Glostrup IC	1–1 (a.e.t.) (6–5 p)	Lyngby BK
Herfølge BK	2–0	Asnæs BK
Husum BK	2–0	Rødby fB
IF Hasle Fuglebakken	1–0	Horsens fS
Jyderup BK	1–3	Brønshøj BK
Kolding IF	2–1 (a.e.t.)	Kerteminde BK
Nakskov BK	4–1	Auning IF
Odder IGF	1–3	B 1909
Skamby BK	2–3 (a.e.t.)	Holstebro BK
IK Skovbakken	1–2	Rudkøbing BK
Slagelse B&I	3–1	Frederikssund IK
Støvring IF	3–1 (a.e.t.)	Odense KFUM
Valby BK	4–6 (a.e.t.)	Stubbekøbing BK
Viborg FF	1–1 (a.e.t.) (4–2 p)	Aabyhøj IF

== Third round ==
Team 1	Score	Team 2
Brønshøj BK	1–2 (a.e.t.)	Esbjerg fB
Frederikshavn fI	1–0	Glostrup IC
BK Frem	4–0	Viborg FF
Fremad Amager	1–3	KB
Herfølge BK	0–3	Odense BK
Holbæk B&I	2–3	Køge BK
Holstebro BK	1–2	B 1903
Husum BK	0–2	Nakskov BK
Kastrup BK	4–2 (a.e.t.)	Slagelse B&I
Kolding IF	3–3 (a.e.t.) (2–4 p)	Støvring IF
Næstved IF	1–2	B 1901
Randers Freja	0–0 (a.e.t.) (3–4 p)	B 1909
Rudkøbing BK	1–3	Helsingør IF
Stubbekøbing BK	2–1	IF Hasle Fuglebakken
Vejle BK	3–0	B 1913
AaB	2–0	Vanløse IF

== Fourth round ==
Team 1	Score	Team 2
B 1909	6–1	Støvring IF
Esbjerg fB	1–0	Køge BK
BK Frem	2–1	KB
Kastrup BK	2–3	B 1903
Nakskov BK	5–1	Frederikshavn fI
Odense BK	6–2	Stubbekøbing BK
Vejle BK	4–1	Helsingør IF
AaB	4–1	B 1901

== Quarter-finals ==
Team 1	Score	Team 2
Esbjerg fB	0–0 (a.e.t.) (3–2 p)	Vejle BK
BK Frem	3–2	B 1909
Odense BK	1–2	B 1903
AaB	2–1	Nakskov BK

== Semi-finals ==
Team 1	Score	Team 2
B 1903	0–1	Esbjerg fB
AaB	2–3 (a.e.t.)	BK Frem

== Final ==
=== Regulation Game ===
4 May 1978

BK Frem	1–1 (a.e.t.)	Esbjerg fB
M. Nielsen 40'	Report	Tosgaard 17'

Københavns Idrætspark, Copenhagen
Attendance: 12,700
Referee: Ole Amundsen

=== Replay ===
8 June 1978

BK Frem	1–1 (a.e.t.)	Esbjerg fB
Larsen 81'	Report	H. Nielsen 19'

Københavns Idrætspark, Copenhagen
Attendance: 1,807
Referee: Poul Jørgen Jensen

=== Second Replay ===
9 August 1978

BK Frem	1–1 (a.e.t.)	Esbjerg fB
Faber 28'	Report	Bach 87'
Penalties
Larsen (penalty scored); Thomsen (penalty scored); Ahlberg (penalty scored); Andersen (penalty scored); M. Nielsen (penalty missed); Rasmussen (penalty missed); Faber (penalty scored)	5–4	(penalty scored) Østergaard; (penalty scored) Bach; (penalty scored) Kjær; (penalty scored) Iversen; (penalty missed) Jespersen; (penalty missed) Bertelsen; (penalty missed) Luxhøj

Københavns Idrætspark, Copenhagen
Attendance: 2,300
Referee: Jørgen Mortensen
