= 1978–79 Danish Cup =

Tournament details
- Country: Denmark

Final positions
- Champions: B 1903
- Runners-up: Køge BK

The 1978–79 Danish Cup was the 25th season of the Danish Cup, the highest football competition in Denmark. The final was played on 24 May 1979.

== First round ==
Team 1	Score	Team 2
B 1921	5–2	Glostrup IF 32
Brøndby IF	5–0	Kalundborg GB
BK Dalgas	2–1	Brønshøj BK
Dragør BK	1–2	BK Vebro
Engesvang BK	0–0 (a.e.t.) (4–3 p)	Fjordager IF
Greve IF	6–0	Maribo BK
Hellerup IK	5–0	Brede IF
Holstebro BK	3–1	B 1913
Hørsholm-Usserød IK	3–0	Herfølge BK
Jægerspris IK	0–5	BK Fremad Valby
Kolding IF	5–2	Svendborg fB
Nakskov BK	2–0	Nørre Alslev BK
Nyborg G&IF	5–1	Snedsted G&IF
OKS	2–3	Nibe BK
Ringkøbing IF	0–1 (a.e.t.)	Støvring IF
Roskilde BK	3–0	BK Hero
Silkeborg IF	4–0	Aalborg Chang
BK Stefan	0–3	AB
Sønderborg BK	2–1 (a.e.t.)	Hjørring IF
Tved BK	2–3 (a.e.t.)	Bramming BK
Tønder SF	3–1 (a.e.t.)	Dalum IF
Varde IF	4–3	Odense KFUM
Vejlby-Risskov IK	1–1 (a.e.t.) (0–3 p)	IF Hasle Fuglebakken
Viborg FF	1–3	Horsens fS
IK Viking Rønne	0–3	Helsingør IF
BK Viktoria	0–9	Lyngby BK
Vordingborg IF	2–3	Jyderup BK
Aabenraa BK	1–2	Glamsbjerg IF

== Second round ==
Team 1	Score	Team 2
B 1921	3–1	Glamsbjerg IF
Bramming BK	0–2	Horsens fS
Brøndby IF	0–4	B.93
Engesvang BK	4–6	Nibe BK
Fremad Amager	2–4	Lyngby BK
BK Fremad Valby	1–4	Slagelse B&I
Glostrup IC	2–1	Greve IF
Helsingør IF	2–4	Vanløse IF
Hellerup IK	1–8	Hvidovre IF
Holbæk B&I	7–2	BK Vebro
Holstebro BK	2–4	B 1909
Hørsholm-Usserød IK	1–1 (a.e.t.) (8–7 p)	Jyderup BK
IF Hasle Fuglebakken	3–5	Støvring IF
Kolding IF	1–2	Silkeborg IF
Nyborg G&IF	7–1	Tønder SF
Næstved IF	2–0	BK Dalgas
Roskilde BK	0–2	AB
IK Skovbakken	4–2	Varde IF
Sønderborg BK	1–6	Ikast FS
AaB	0–2	Nakskov BK

== Third round ==
Team 1	Score	Team 2
AB	2–4	Slagelse B&I
B 1901	3–2	Randers Freja
B 1921	1–1 (a.e.t.) (6–7 p)	Hvidovre IF
B.93	1–2	AGF
Frederikshavn fI	3–1	Lyngby BK
Holbæk B&I	3–2	Esbjerg fB
Horsens fS	0–1	Støvring IF
Hørsholm-Usserød IK	1–7	B 1909
Ikast FS	2–1	Vanløse IF
Kastrup BK	0–3	B 1903
Køge BK	4–1	Silkeborg IF
Nakskov BK	4–2	Nibe BK
Nyborg G&IF	0–3	BK Frem
Næstved IF	4–0	Glostrup IC
Odense BK	2–2 (a.e.t.) (4–2 p)	KB
IK Skovbakken	1–1 (a.e.t.) (2–4 p)	Vejle BK

== Fourth round ==
Team 1	Score	Team 2
AGF	3–1	Vejle BK
B 1903	4–3	Holbæk B&I
B 1909	4–3 (a.e.t.)	BK Frem
Frederikshavn fI	3–4	Hvidovre IF
Køge BK	3–2	Ikast FS
Nakskov BK	3–2 (a.e.t.)	Odense BK
Næstved IF	1–4	B 1901
Støvring IF	1–6	Slagelse B&I

== Quarter-finals ==
Team 1	Score	Team 2
AGF	1–2	Køge BK
B 1909	2–2 (a.e.t.) (2–3 p)	B 1901
Nakskov BK	1–2	B 1903
Slagelse B&I	3–5	Hvidovre IF

== Semi-finals ==
Team 1	Score	Team 2
B 1901	0–3	Køge BK
Hvidovre IF	0–0 (a.e.t.)	B 1903

=== Replay ===
Team 1	Score	Team 2
B 1903	3–0	Hvidovre IF

== Final ==
24 May 1979

B 1903	1–0	Køge BK
Hansen 75'	Report

Københavns Idrætspark, Copenhagen
Attendance: 9,800
Referee: Poul Jørgen Jensen
