= 1968–69 Danish Cup =

Tournament details
- Country: Denmark

Final positions
- Champions: KB
- Runners-up: BK Frem

The 1968–69 Danish Cup was the 15th season of the Danish Cup, the highest football competition in Denmark. The final was played on 15 May 1969.

== First round ==
Team 1	Score	Team 2
IF AIA-Tranbjerg	3–9	Aabenraa BK
Assens G&IK	0–1	Aalestrup IF
B 1921	2–4	Lyngby BK
Bramming BK	3–4 (a.e.t.)	Auning IF
Brønderslev IF	3–8	Frederikshavn fI
Frederiksberg BK	5–1	BK Vestia
Fremad Amager	7–3 (a.e.t.)	Skovshoved IF
Grenaa IF	3–2	Hirtshals BK
Gentofte-Vangede IF	11–1	Handelsstandes BK
Herlev IF	3–1	B 1950 Bolderslev
Hellerup IK	4–6	BK Fremad Valby
Holbæk B&I	7–0	Kirke Såby IF Thor
Glostrup IF 32	5–0	Taarbæk IF
Jyderup BK	6–0	Rønne IK
Kerteminde BK	0–1	Odense KFUM
Kolding IF	4–0	Kibæk IF
BK Rødovre	2–2 (a.e.t.) (3–4 p)	Taastrup FC
Store Merløse IF	10–2	Dragør BK
Stubbekøbing BK	2–3	Frem Sakskøbing
Svendborg fB	1–5	IF Fuglebakken
Søllerød BK	1–0	Roskilde BK
Thisted FC	5–2	Vejen SF
Toksværd Olstrup Fodbold	3–5 (a.e.t.)	Nyborg G&IF
Tårup IF	3–5	Lindholm IF
Vejle FC	3–1	Stoholm IF
Viborg FF	5–0	Brande IF
Vorup Frederiksberg BK	9–2	Tved BK
Ørslevkloster IF	2–3	B 47 Esbjerg

== Second round ==
Team 1	Score	Team 2
Auning IF	1–8	Randers Freja
B 1903	3–2	Aabenraa BK
B 47 Esbjerg	0–2	Jyderup BK
BK Fremad Valby	2–4	Viborg FF
Grenaa IF	1–4	Næstved IF
Gentofte-Vangede IF	0–2	Odense KFUM
Herlev IF	2–1	IF Fuglebakken
Glostrup IF 32	8–2	Lindholm IF
Ikast FS	1–2	Frederiksberg BK
Lyngby BK	1–0	Fremad Amager
Nyborg G&IF	3–0	Kolding IF
Silkeborg IF	3–1	Holbæk B&I
IK Skovbakken	1–2	B 1901
Slagelse B&I	1–5	Brønshøj BK
Store Merløse IF	3–4	Vanløse IF
Søllerød BK	2–3	Køge BK
Thisted FC	4–1	Frem Sakskøbing
Vejle FC	1–2	Taastrup FC
Vorup Frederiksberg BK	1–0	B.93
Aalestrup IF	3–8	Frederikshavn fI

== Third round ==
Team 1	Score	Team 2
AB	3–1	Odense BK
B 1901	1–2	Køge BK
B 1903	3–2 (a.e.t.)	Brønshøj BK
B 1909	2–5	B 1913
Frederiksberg BK	0–4	Esbjerg fB
BK Frem	7–3	Randers Freja
Herlev IF	0–5	AGF
Horsens fS	4–2	Thisted FC
Hvidovre IF	1–5	Vejle BK
Jyderup BK	3–6	Silkeborg IF
KB	3–1	Glostrup IF 32
Lyngby BK	5–0	Vorup Frederiksberg BK
Næstved IF	3–0	Nyborg G&IF
Odense KFUM	0–5	AaB
Taastrup FC	4–1	Vanløse IF
Viborg FF	2–3	Frederikshavn fI

== Fourth round ==
Team 1	Score	Team 2
AGF	1–5	Frederikshavn fI
B 1913	1–2	AB
Esbjerg fB	0–4	AaB
BK Frem	3–2	Horsens fS
KB	3–0	Taastrup FC
Lyngby BK	1–2	B 1903
Silkeborg IF	0–1	Køge BK
Vejle BK	3–0	Næstved IF

== Quarter-finals ==
Team 1	Score	Team 2
BK Frem	2–1	AB
KB	1–0	Køge BK
Vejle BK	0–2	B 1903
AaB	1–0	Frederikshavn fI

== Semi-finals ==
Team 1	Score	Team 2
BK Frem	3–1 (a.e.t.)	B 1903
AaB	0–1 (a.e.t.)	KB

== Final ==
15 May 1969

KB	3–0	BK Frem
Præst 15'; Skouborg 55'; Holmstrøm 71'	Report

Københavns Idrætspark, Copenhagen
Attendance: 18,500
Referee: Kaj Rasmussen
