= Knud Sørensen (disambiguation) =

Knud Sørensen (1928–2022) was a Danish writer.

Knud Sørensen is also the name of:

- Knud Sørensen (footballer) (1909–1979), Danish footballer, 1933–36 Nordic Football Championship
- Knud Herbert Sørensen (footballer born 1934), Danish footballer
- Knud Herbert Sørensen (footballer born 1952), Danish footballer
