= Knud Herbert Sørensen (footballer, born 1952) =

Danish footballer

Knud Herbert Prytz Sørensen
Personal information
- Full name: Knud Herbert Prytz Sørensen
- Date of birth: 12 December 1952 (age 73)
- Place of birth: Middelfart, Denmark
- Position: Midfielder

Youth career
- Middelfart

Senior career*
Years	Team	Apps	(Gls)
1971–1985	Vejle Boldklub	326	(24)

International career
1974–1979	Denmark U21	19	(3)
1976–1977	Denmark	3	(0)
- * Club domestic league appearances and goals

Knud Herbert Prytz Sørensen (born 12 December 1952) is a Danish former footballer

== Biography ==
Sørensen played his entire career for Vejle Boldklub. With 476 matches Knud Herbert is number two on the alltime match record list of VB after the former captain Gert Eg.

His father, Finn Sørensen, named him Knud Herbert because he was a huge fan of his teammate in Vejle Boldklub's 1950s team Knud Herbert Sørensen. Later on it turned out that Finn's son also would become a great player in Vejle Boldklub and a Danish international.

Sørensen was known as a solid rock in the midfield with a good view of the game and a fine technique. In addition to this he was also a determined fighter. One of his tackles is a classic on Vejle Stadion. Knud Herbert came into the tackle with full power and forced the opponent to the ground while the ball flew out of the stadium and far into the forest.

Sørensen has won the Danish championship with Vejle Boldklub in 1978 and 1984 and the Danish Cup in 1977 and 1981. He made his debut on the Danish national team in 1976 and played three games for Denmark in the period between 1976 and 1977.

After his active career Knud Herbert Sørensen continued working for Vejle Boldklub. He has been coach of the club's best youth teams and in 2006 he was named new chairman. However, it was a difficult period for the Vejle Boldklub and Knud Herbert's time as chairman did not last long.
