= Danish Cup =

Official top knock-out football tournament in Denmark

- Founded: 1954; 72 years ago
- Region: Denmark
- Teams: 104
- Qualifier for: UEFA Europa League
- Current champions: Midtjylland (3rd title)
- Most championships: Copenhagen (10 titles)
- Broadcaster(s): DR; TV3 Sport
- Website: pokalturnering.dk

The Danish Cup (Danish: Landspokalturneringen; often referred to as Pokalen), since 2026 also known as Betano Pokalen for sponsorship reasons, is the official "knockout" cup competition in Danish football, run by the Danish Football Association. The cup has been contested annually since 1955.

The winner will qualify for the UEFA Europa League tournament the following year, where they (as of the 2009–10 season) will enter in the third qualifying round.

The final traditionally takes place on Kristi Himmelfarts Dag (The Ascension) and it is always played in the Danish national stadium Parken. However in the 1991 and 1992 seasons the final had been rescheduled to Odense Stadion and Århus Stadion respectively due to the renovation of Parken. Furthermore, in 2011, because Ascension Thursday fell on 2 June and an international match date was already allotted for this date, the Danish Cup final was played two weeks earlier on 22 May, which coincided with the annual Copenhagen Marathon.

Attention has been brought to the fact that the final on most occasions unpractically is played before the last rounds of the league, which can open up for speculation in the benefit of losing league games at the end of the season especially for the cup runner-up if the winner is heading for the league championship. Recently former AaB player David Nielsen claimed in his autobiography that after losing the cup final in 2004 to FC Copenhagen, he deliberately missed opportunities to score against them when AaB and FC Copenhagen met in the final league match because FCK would win the championship (and thereby the double) and land AaB in the UEFA Cup as losing cup finalists.

== Format ==
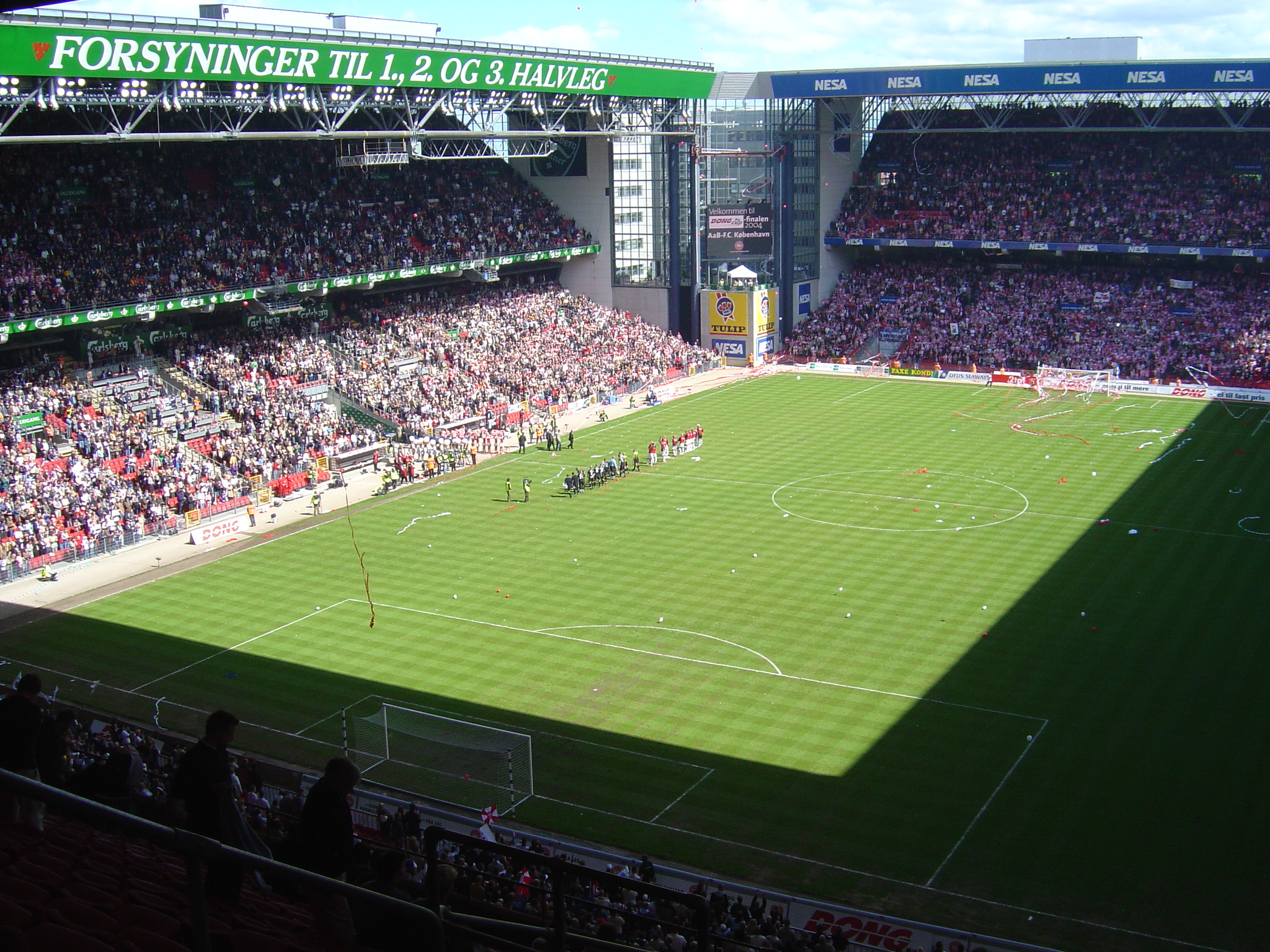
The 2003–04 season finale between F.C. Copenhagen and AaB in Parken Stadium.

Each club may only have one team in the tournament (their first team). If a match (except one of the two-legged semifinals, except if the 2nd match's result gives an aggregate tie, including the away goals rule) ends in a tie, two fifteen-minute extra time periods will be played, with penalty kicks if the tie remains after the extra time.

=== The participants ===
The teams are not seeded, but the lowest placed team from the previous season will always get the home pitch advantage.

==== Until 2005–06 ====
- 1st round, 64 teams
  - 48 teams qualified through preliminary cups held by the regional associations.
  - 16 teams from the 2nd division (all teams)
- 2nd round, 32+8 teams
  - 32 teams from the 1st round (winners)
  - 8 teams from the 1st division (9th–16th placed)
- 3rd round, 20+8 teams
  - 20 teams from the 2nd round
  - 6 teams from the 1st division (3rd–8th placed)
  - 2 teams from the Superliga (11th–12th, the relegated teams which are now in the 1st division)
- 4th round, 14+6 teams
  - 14 teams from the 3rd round
  - 4 teams from the Superliga (7th–10th)
  - 2 teams from the 1st division (1st–2nd, the promoted teams which are now in the Superliga)
- 5th round, 10+6 teams
  - 10 teams from the 4th round
  - 6 teams from the Superliga (1st–6th)
- Quarterfinals, 8 teams
  - 8 teams from the 5th round

– and so on until the finals.

==== From 2006–07 ====
- 1st round, 88 teams
  - 48 teams qualified through preliminary cups held by the regional associations.
  - 28 teams from the 2nd divisions (all teams)
  - 12 teams from the 1st division (5th–16th placed)
- 2nd round, 44+12 teams
  - 44 teams from the 1st round (winners)
  - 4 teams from the 1st division (1st–4th placed)
  - 8 teams from the Superliga (5th–12th placed).
- 3rd round, 28+4 teams
  - 28 teams from the 2nd round
  - 4 teams from the Superliga (1st–4th placed)
- 4th round, 16 teams
  - 16 teams from the 3rd round
- Quarterfinals, 8 teams
  - 8 teams from the 4th round

– and so on until the finals.

==== From 2021–22 ====
- 1st round, 92 teams
  - 56 teams qualified through preliminary cups held by the regional associations.
  - 12 teams from the 3rd divisions
  - 12 teams from the 2nd divisions
  - 12 teams from the 1st division
- 2nd round, 46+6 teams
  - 46 teams from the 1st round (winners)
  - 6 teams from the Superliga (7th–12th placed).
- 3rd round, 26+6 teams
  - 26 teams from the 2nd round
  - 6 teams from the Superliga (1st–6th placed)
- 4th round, 16 teams
  - 16 teams from the 3rd round
- Quarterfinals, 8 teams
  - 8 teams from the 4th round

– and so on until the finals.

== Finals ==
Season	Final					
Season	Winner (title no.)	Score	Runner-up	Man of the Match (Pokalfighter)	Stadium	Attendance
Landspokalturneringen
1954–55	AGF	4 – 0	Aalborg Chang	Aage Rou Jensen, AGF	Idrætsparken	10,300
1955–56	Frem	1 – 0	AB	Bent Jørgensen, Frem	Idrætsparken	23,000
1956–57	AGF (2)	2 – 0	Esbjerg fB	John Amdisen, AGF	Idrætsparken	25,800
1957–58	Vejle	3 – 2	KB	Knud Herbert Sørensen, Vejle	Idrætsparken	28,600
1958–59	Vejle (2)	1 – 1 (a.e.t.)	AGF	Erling Sørensen, Vejle	Idrætsparken	33,000
1958–59	Vejle (2)	Replay: 1 – 0	AGF	—N/a	Idrætsparken	17,700
1959–60	AGF (3)	2 – 0	Frem Sakskøbing	Vagn Hansen, Frem Sakskøbing	Idrætsparken	17,500
1960–61	AGF (4)	2 – 0	KB	John Amdisen, AGF	Idrætsparken	33,500
1961–62	B1909	1 – 0	Esbjerg fB	Bruno Eliasen, B 1909	Idrætsparken	18,000
1962–63	B1913	2 – 1	Køge	Hans Andersen, Køge	Idrætsparken	10,900
1963–64	Esbjerg fB	2 – 1	Odense KFUM	Carl Bertelsen, Esbjerg fB	Idrætsparken	24,500
1964–65	AGF (5)	1 – 0	KB	Frank Johansen, KB	Idrætsparken	18,600
1965–66	AaB	3 – 1 (a.e.t.)	KB	Leif Skov, AaB	Idrætsparken	18,600
1966–67	Randers Freja	1 – 0	AaB	Jørgen Rasmussen, Randers Freja	Idrætsparken	13,700
1967–68	Randers Freja (2)	3 – 1	Vejle	Per Gaardsøe, Randers Freja	Idrætsparken	15,200
1968–69	KB	3 – 0	Frem	Flemming Pedersen, KB	Idrætsparken	18,500
1969–70	AaB (2)	2 – 1	Lyngby	Carsten Aagaard, Lyngby	Idrætsparken	18,200
1970–71	B1909 (2)	1 – 0	Frem	Arno Hansen, B1909	Idrætsparken	23,700
1971–72	Vejle (3)	2 – 0	Fremad Amager	Tonny Hartvig Nielsen, Fremad Amager	Idrætsparken	20,200
1972–73	Randers Freja (3)	2 – 0	B1901	Helge Vonsyld, Randers Freja	Idrætsparken	21,800
1973–74	Vanløse IF (Note: Vanløse played in tier 2 at the time.)	5 – 2	OB	Per Bartram, OB	Idrætsparken	20,000
1974–75	Vejle (4)	1 – 0	Holbæk B&I	Niels Tune, Holbæk B&I	Idrætsparken	26,300
1975–76	Esbjerg fB (2)	2 – 1	Holbæk B&I	Jens Jørn Bertelsen, Esbjerg fB	Idrætsparken	23,500
1976–77	Vejle (5)	2 – 1	B1909	Henning Andersen, B 1909	Idrætsparken	13,100
1977–78	Frem (2)	1 – 1 (a.e.t.)	Esbjerg fB	Erik Jespersen, Esbjerg fB	Idrætsparken	12,700
1977–78	Frem (2)	Replay: 1 – 1 (a.e.t.)	Esbjerg fB	—N/a	Idrætsparken	1,800
1977–78	Frem (2)	Replay: 1 – 1 (a.e.t., 5 – 4 pen.)	Esbjerg fB	—N/a	Idrætsparken	2,300
1978–79	B1903	1 – 0	Køge	Peter Poulsen, Køge	Idrætsparken	9,800
1979–80	Hvidovre IF	5 – 3	Lyngby	Michael Christensen, Hvidovre IF	Idrætsparken	23,500
1980–81	Vejle (6)	2 – 1	Frem	Poul Erik Østergaard, Vejle	Idrætsparken	17,500
1981–82	B.93	3 – 3 (a.e.t.)	B1903	Ole Pedersen, B 93	Idrætsparken	7,600
1981–82	B.93	Replay: 1 – 0	B1903	—N/a	Idrætsparken	5,300
1982–83	OB	3 – 0	B1901	Morten Donnerup, OB	Idrætsparken	7,700
1983–84	Lyngby	2 – 1	KB	Bo Fosgaard, KB	Idrætsparken	25,800
1984–85	Lyngby (2)	3 – 2	Esbjerg fB	Henrik Nielsen, Esbjerg fB	Idrætsparken	9,200
1985–86	B1903 (2)	2 – 1	Ikast fS	Sigurd Kristensen, Ikast fS	Idrætsparken	5,600
1986–87	AGF (6)	3 – 0	AaB	Karsten Christensen, AGF	Idrætsparken	6,300
1987–88	AGF (7)	2 – 1 (a.e.t.)	Brøndby IF	Troels Rasmussen, AGF	Idrætsparken	20,000
1988–89	Brøndby IF	6 – 3 (a.e.t.)	Ikast fS	Klaus Granlund, Ikast fS	Idrætsparken	11,600
Giro Cup
1989–90	Lyngby (3)	0 – 0 (a.e.t.)	AGF	Henrik Larsen, Lyngby	Idrætsparken	8,600
1989–90	Lyngby (3)	Replay: 6 – 1	AGF	—N/a	Idrætsparken	2,000
1990–91	OB (2)	0 – 0 (a.e.t.)	AaB	Keld Bordinggaard, OB	Odense Stadion	13,212
1990–91	OB (2)	Replay: 0 – 0 (a.e.t., 4 – 3 pen.)	AaB	—N/a	Odense Stadion	4,554
1991–92	AGF (8)	3 – 0	B1903	Bo Harder, AGF	Aarhus Idrætspark	20,000
1992–93	OB (3)	2 – 0	AaB	Søren Thorst, AaB	Parken	9,023
1993–94	Brøndby IF (2)	0 – 0 (a.e.t., 3 – 1 pen.)	Næstved IF	Jørgen Juul Jensen, Næstved IF	Parken	27,069
1994–95	F.C. Copenhagen	5 – 0	AB	Carsten V. Jensen, F.C. Copenhagen	Parken	20,536
1995–96	AGF (9)	2 – 0	Brøndby IF	Stig Tøfting, AGF	Parken	36,103
Compaq Cup
1996–97	F.C. Copenhagen (2)	2 – 0	Ikast fS	Lars "Mini" Hansen, Ikast fS	Parken	17,368
1997–98	Brøndby IF (3)	4 – 1	F.C. Copenhagen	John "Faxe" Jensen, Brøndby IF	Parken	41,044
1998–99	AB	2 – 1	AaB	René Henriksen, AB	Parken	25,113
DONG Cup
1999–2000	Viborg	1 – 0	AaB	Arek Onyszko, Viborg FF	Parken	18,098
2000–01	Silkeborg IF	4 – 1	AB	Jan Michaelsen, AB	Parken	14,743
2001–02	OB (4)	2 – 1	F.C. Copenhagen	Lars Jacobsen, OB	Parken	28,481
2002–03	Brøndby IF (4)	3 – 0	FC Midtjylland	Kasper Dalgas, Brøndby IF	Parken	32,660
2003–04	F.C. Copenhagen (3)	1 – 0	AaB	Hjalte Bo Nørregaard, F.C. Copenhagen	Parken	38,095
Landspokalturneringen
2004–05	Brøndby IF (5)	3 – 2 (a.e.t.)	FC Midtjylland	Johan Elmander, Brøndby IF	Parken	35,716
2005–06	Randers FC	1 – 0 (a.e.t.)	Esbjerg fB	Carsten Fredgaard, Randers FC	Parken	23,825
2006–07	OB (5)	2 – 1	F.C. Copenhagen	Johan Absalonsen, OB	Parken	30,013
2007–08	Brøndby IF (6)	3 – 2	Esbjerg fB	Samuel Holmén, Brøndby IF	Parken	33,154
Ekstra Bladet Cup
2008–09	F.C. Copenhagen (4)	1 – 0	AaB	Thomas Augustinussen, AaB	Parken	29,249
2009–10	FC Nordsjælland	2 – 0 (a.e.t.)	FC Midtjylland	Nicolai Stokholm, FC Nordsjælland	Parken	18,856
2010–11	FC Nordsjælland (2)	3 – 2	FC Midtjylland	Mikkel Thygesen, FC Midtjylland	Parken	14,646
DBU Pokalen
2011–12	F.C. Copenhagen (5)	1 – 0	AC Horsens	Bryan Oviedo, FC Copenhagen	Parken	21,963
2012–13	Esbjerg fB (3)	1 – 0	Randers FC	Magnus Lekven, Esbjerg fB	Parken	26,194
2013–14	AaB (3)	4 – 2	F.C. Copenhagen	Rasmus Thelander, AaB	Parken	27,824
2014–15	F.C. Copenhagen (6)	3 – 2 (a.e.t.)	FC Vestsjælland	Thomas Delaney, F.C. Copenhagen	Parken	24,095
2015–16	F.C. Copenhagen (7)	2 – 1	AGF	William Kvist, F.C. Copenhagen	Parken	35,828
2016–17	F.C. Copenhagen (8)	3 – 1	Brøndby IF	Stephan Andersen, F.C. Copenhagen	Parken	32,140
2017–18	Brøndby IF (7)	3 – 1	Silkeborg IF	Simon Jakobsen, Silkeborg IF	Parken	31,027
Sydbank Pokalen
2018–19	FC Midtjylland	1 – 1 (a.e.t., 4 – 3 pen.)	Brøndby IF	Gustav Wikheim, FC Midtjylland	Parken	31,430
2019–20	SønderjyskE	2 – 0	AaB	Anders K. Jacobsen, Sønderjyske	Esbjerg Stadion	1,750 (Note: Played in front of a limited number of spectators because of governmental restrictions owing to the COVID-19 pandemic.)
2020–21	Randers FC (2)	4 – 0	Sønderjyske	Mathias Greve, Randers FC	Aarhus Idrætspark	7,981
2021–22	FC Midtjylland (2)	0 – 0 (a.e.t., 4 – 3 pen.)	OB	Ayo Simon Okosun, OB	Brøndby Stadion	23,328
Pokalen
2022–23	F.C. Copenhagen (9)	1 – 0	AaB	Lucas Andersen, AaB	Parken	34,937
Oddset Pokalen
2023–24	Silkeborg IF (2)	1 – 0	AGF	Stefán Teitur Þórðarson, Silkeborg IF	Parken	36,300
2024–25	Copenhagen (10)	3 – 0	Silkeborg	Victor Froholdt, F.C. Copenhagen	MCH Arena	11,048
2025–26	FC Midtjylland (3)	1 – 0	Copenhagen	Mads Bech Sørensen, FC Midtjylland	Parken	35,485
Betano Pokalen
2026–27						

== Results by team ==
Team	#	Titles	#	Runners-up
F.C. Copenhagen	10	1994–95, 1996–97, 2003–04, 2008–09, 2011–12, 2014–15, 2015–16, 2016–17, 2022–23, 2024–25	5	1997–98, 2001–02, 2006–07, 2013–14, 2025–26
AGF	9	1954–55, 1956–57, 1959–60, 1960–61, 1964–65, 1986–87, 1987–88, 1991–92, 1995–96	4	1958–59, 1989–90, 2015–16, 2023–24
Brøndby IF	7	1988–89, 1993–94, 1997–98, 2002–03, 2004–05, 2007–08, 2017–18	4	1987–88, 1995–96, 2016–17, 2018–19
Vejle	6	1957–58, 1958–59, 1971–72, 1974–75, 1976–77, 1980–81	1	1967–68
OB	5	1982–83, 1990–91, 1992–93, 2001–02, 2006–07	2	1973–74, 2021–22
AaB	3	1965–66, 1969–70, 2013–14	10	1966–67, 1986–87, 1990–91, 1992–93, 1998–99, 1999–2000, 2003–04, 2008–09, 2019–20, 2022–23
Esbjerg fB	3	1963–64, 1975–76, 2012–13	6	1956–57, 1961–62, 1977–78, 1984–85, 2005–06, 2007–08
FC Midtjylland	3	2018–19, 2021–22, 2025–26	4	2002–03, 2004–05, 2009–10, 2010–11
Lyngby	3	1983–84, 1984–85, 1989–90	2	1969–70, 1979–80
Randers Freja	3	1966–67, 1967–68, 1972–73	–	–
Frem	2	1955–56, 1977–78	3	1968–69, 1970–71, 1980–81
B1903	2	1978–79, 1985–86	2	1981–82, 1991–92
Silkeborg IF	2	2000–01, 2023–24	2	2017–18, 2024–25
Randers FC	2	2005–06, 2020–21	1	2012–13
B1909	2	1961–62, 1970–71	1	1976–77
FC Nordsjælland	2	2009–10, 2010–11	–	–
KB	1	1968–69	5	1957–58, 1960–61, 1964–65, 1965–66, 1983–84
AB	1	1998–99	3	1955–56, 1994–95, 2000–01
Sønderjyske	1	2019–20	1	2020–21
Viborg	1	1999–2000	–	–
B.93	1	1981–82	–	–
Hvidovre IF	1	1979–80	–	–
Vanløse IF	1	1973–74	–	–
B1913	1	1962–63	–	–
Ikast fS	–	–	3	1985–86, 1988–89, 1996–97
B1901	–	–	2	1972–73, 1982–83
Køge BK	–	–	2	1962–63, 1978–79
Holbæk B&I	–	–	2	1974–75, 1975–76
FC Vestsjælland	–	–	1	2014–15
AC Horsens	–	–	1	2011–12
Næstved IF	–	–	1	1993–94
Fremad Amager	–	–	1	1971–72
Odense KFUM	–	–	1	1963–64
Frem Sakskøbing	–	–	1	1959–60
Aalborg Chang	–	–	1	1954–55
