= Helge Vonsyld =

Danish footballer (born 1947)

Personal information
- Date of birth: 18 October 1947 (age 79)
- Place of birth: Randers, Denmark
- Height: 1.81 m (5 ft 11 in)
- Position: Defender

Senior career*
| Years | Team | Apps | (Gls) |
- Randers Freja

International career
| 1973–1974 | Denmark | 10 | (0) |
- * Club domestic league appearances and goals

Helge Vonsyld (born 18 October 1947) is a Danish former footballer who played as a defender. He played in ten matches for the Denmark national team from 1973 to 1974, competing in the men's tournament at the 1972 Summer Olympics.
