= Jørgen Rasmussen (footballer, born 1945) =

Danish footballer

Jørgen Vandborg Rasmussen (born 14 July 1945) is a Danish former football (soccer) player, who played 29 games for the Danish national team from 1971 to 1975, and represented Denmark at the 1972 Summer Olympics. Born in Randers, Rasmussen played as a defender for Randers Freja.
