= Knud Herbert Sørensen (footballer, born 1934) =

Danish footballer

Personal information
- Date of birth: 21 January 1934 (age 92)
- Place of birth: Middelfart, Denmark
- Position: Defender

Youth career
- Middelfart G&F

Senior career*
Years	Team	Apps	(Gls)
1954–1962	Vejle Boldklub	143	(15)

International career^{‡}
1954–1955	Denmark U21	2	(0)
1958	Denmark A	2	(0)
- * Club domestic league appearances and goals as of 22:55, 10 May 2008 (UTC) ‡ National team caps and goals as of May 23, 2008

Knud Herbert Sørensen (born 21 January 1934) is a Danish former footballer who played as a defender for Vejle Boldklub and the Denmark national football team.

== Career ==
Sørensen was a central player on the team that secured Vejle Boldklub its promotion to the Danish 1st Division league in 1956. In 1958 he won The Double with VB and he was voted Man of the Match in the Danish Cup final against Copenhagen. Vejle won the title once again the following season.

Sørensen made his debut for the Denmark national football team in 1958. He played two games for the national team that year.
