= Taastrup FC =

Danish football club

- Full name: Taastrup Fodbold Club
- Founded: 25 October 2005; 20 years ago
- Ground: Taastrup Idrætspark; Taastrup, Denmark
- Capacity: 1,000
- Chairman: Jørgen Kolter Jensen
- Manager: Emil Rasmus Lindbom
- League: Zealand Series
- Website: http://www.taastrupfc.com/
| Home colours | Away colours |

Taastrup FC is an association football club based in the town of Taastrup, Denmark, that competes in the Zealand Series, one of the sixth tiers of the Danish football league system. The club is affiliated to DBU Zealand which is part of the Danish Football Union, and plays its home matches at Taastrup Idrætspark where it has been based since its establishment.

== History ==
=== Foundation ===
The decision to establish a superstructure between the men's teams of the football departments in Tåstrup B.70 and Taastrup IK 90 (TIK 90) was made in the autumn of 2001, which meant that the clubs' teams would go under the name of Taastrup FC in a competitive context from the 2001–02 season. The cooperation committee responsible for the merger were 10 appointed members each from Tåstrup B.70 and Tåstrup IK 90.

Other clubs in Høje-Taastrup Municipality opted for the opportunity to join the superstructure and the football department in Høje-Taastrup Idrætsforening (HTI) was initially also enthusiastic about the prospects of joining the merger, but ultimately chose not to participate further in the project. The background for the collaboration was a common desire for more competitive successes in the two clubs, whose respective first teams at the time were in the seventh best tier of Danish football. B.70, however, secured promotion from Series 1, the second-highest regional level, at the end of the 2001 season, which meant that Taastrup FC could start its existence in the Zealand Series in 2002 on B.70's playing license as the highest ranking of the parent clubs' senior teams. Between the two clubs, Taastrup IK 90's football department had the best historic achievements, with their participation in the then third best tier of the Danish football league system (Danish 3rd Division East) in periods from 1967 to 1973.

The partial merger went through a trial-period of four years before the two boards decided in the autumn of 2005 – after preliminary success – to implement a complete merger of the football departments of the two clubs effective as of 1 January 2006. The merger agreement was adopted by a total of 237 votes in favour and 15 votes against an extraordinary general meeting on 26 August 2005. The necessary majority of at least two-thirds of the total vote was thus secured by 94%. Subsequently, all members of the merging clubs were invited to the founding general meeting held on 25 October 2005 in Taastrup Medborgerhus. At the general meeting, a number of amendments were made to a draft of the articles of association, after which these were unanimously adopted and the new club, Taastrup FC, was established. Jørgen Wulff Rasmussen was elected to be the club's first chairman, after having been proposed by the parent clubs' respective boards, for a period valid until the first annual general meeting was to be held on 28 February 2006, where he was re-elected to the position.
