= Svebølle BI 2016 =

Danish football club

- Full name: Svebølle Boldklub og Idrætsforening 2016
- Nickname: Svølle
- Founded: 1924; 2016 (refounded)
- Ground: Svebølle Stadion, Svebølle
- Capacity: 3,500
- Chairman: Claus Paulsen
- Manager: Jesper Falck
- League: Zealand Series
Home colours	Away colours

Svebølle Boldklub og Idrætsforening 2016, commonly known as Svebølle BI 2016 or SBI is a Danish association football club currently playing in the Series 1, the sixth tier of the Danish football league system and the second under the regional association, DBU Zealand. They play at Svebølle Stadion in Svebølle on Zealand, which has a capacity of 3,500.
