= Otterup B&IK =

Danish football club

Otterup
- Full name: Otterup Bold- & Idrætsklub
- Short name: OB&IK
- Founded: 2 August 1913; 111 years ago
- Ground: Otterup Stadium, Otterup
- Capacity: 1,200
- Chairman: Bent Hjortebjerg
- Manager: Chris Margaard
- League: Denmark Series
- 2019–20: Denmark Series Group 3, 2nd
Home colours	Away colours

Otterup Bold- & Idrætsklub (Danish: [ˈʌtəʁɔp ˈpʌlt ʌ ˈi(ː)tʁætsˌkʰlup]), commonly known as Otterup B&IK, is an association football club based in the town of Otterup, Funen, Denmark, that competes in the Denmark Series, the fourth tier of the Danish football league system. Founded in 1913, it is also known by its shortened name "OB&IK" and affiliated to the local DBU Funen association. The team plays its home matches at Otterup Stadium, where it has been based since the 1950s and has a capacity of 1,200.
