= FC Sønderborg =

Danish football club

- Full name: FC Sønderborg
- Founded: 2009; 16 years ago
- Ground: Sønderborg Stadion, Sønderborg
- Capacity: 2,200 (2,000 seated)
- Chairman: Hans Christian Jensen
| Home colours | Away colours |

FC Sønderborg is a Danish football club based in Sønderborg, Southern Jutland. Affiliated to the multiple regional clubs, they currently only feature youth teams. Until 2020, FC Sønderborg had a first team led by manager Kim Poulsen, but the team withdrew from competition citing too little interest from parent clubs in providing senior players.

The vision of FC Sønderborg is to "create an elite environment for U13-U19 players in Sønderborg Municipality," through a cooperation between 11 local clubs with around 2,500 members in total.

== History ==
In February 2009, FC Sønderborg was founded through a merger of 11 regional teams in order to create an elite youth academy for the under-13 to under-19 talents in Sønderborg Municipality. In 2010, this initiative was extended to the senior teams.

In the fall of 2019, with FC Sønderborg facing relegation from the fifth-tier Jutland Series, manager Kim Poulsen criticised the historical lack of ambition in Sønderborg in creating an environment for divisional football.

The first team withdrew from competition in April 2020, citing lacking interest from parent clubs in providing senior players. Instead, Poulsen stated that the club would focus increasingly on youth development and strengthen cooperation with Danish Superliga club SønderjyskE.
