= Tårnby Boldklub =

Danish football club

- Full name: Tårnby Boldklub
- Nickname(s): TB; Ama'rkanerne
- Founded: 21 April 1935 (as AIK Tårnby)
- Dissolved: 31 December 2008 (became AB Tårnby)
- Ground: Tårnby Stadium
- Capacity: 10,000 (350 seated)
- Final season; 2008–09: 5th (Denmark Series, Group 1)
Home colours

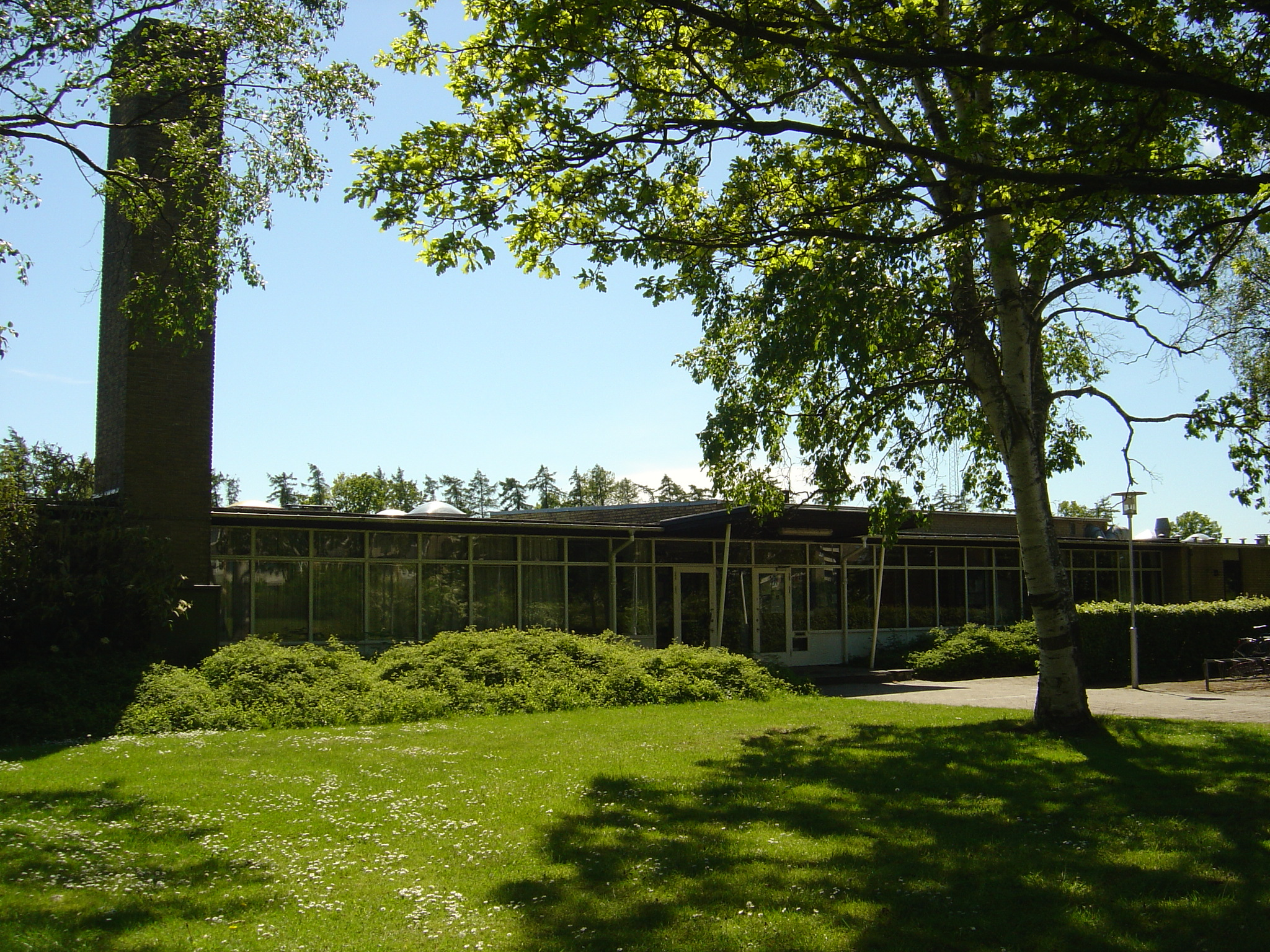
Tårnby Boldklub members' building in May 2007 located at Tårnby Stadium.

Tårnby Boldklub (or Taarnby Boldklub, both pronounced [ˈtsʰɒːnˌpyˀ ˈpʌltkʰlup]) were a Danish football club based in Tårnby on Amager, which played their home games at Taarnby Stadium. The club was formed on 21 April 1935 as Arbejdernes Idræts Klub Tårnby (AIK Tårnby) and became member of Dansk Arbejder Idrætsforbund (DAI) on 1 May 1935. After nearly 10 years in DAI, it was decided at a general meeting on 16 January 1944 to change their membership to Københavns Boldspil-Union (KBU) and in this regard change their name to Tårnby Boldklub. The club became an extraordinary member of KBU on 1 July 1944 and a full member in February 1945 and started their first season 1944–45 under the new football association by playing in a newly created 'C-række' consisting of 8 clubs. The club enjoyed rivalries against neighbouring clubs Kastrup Boldklub and in the early days Sundby Boldklub. In 2002 the club together with Kastrup Boldklub became a part of the superstructure Amager United. In 2006, Kastrup Boldklub, however withdrew from the collaboration and the superstructure was dissolved. On 1 January 2009, the club merged with neighbouring Amager Boldklub af 1970 (AB70), and the new association was named AB Tårnby.

== Achievements ==
- 6 seasons in the Third Highest Danish League

== Club's honours ==
=== Domestic ===
- Københavnsserien (V under KBU)
  - Winners (2): 1977 (A), 1984
  - Runner-Up (3): 1973 (A), 1976 (A), 1989^{‡}
- Mellemrækken (V under KBU)
  - Winners (1): 1955–56
  - Runners-up (1): 1954–55
- A-rækken (VI under KBU)
  - Winners (1): 1952–53
- B-rækken (VII under KBU)
  - Winners (1): 1947–48
- Triangelpokalen
  - Winners (2): 1951, 1952
- A-rækken (II under DAI)
  - Winners (1): 1941–42
- DAI's pokalturnering
  - Winners (1): 1941–42

^{‡}: Won by reserve team
