= Gladsaxe-Hero Boldklub =

Danish football club

- Founded: 1979
- Ground: Gladsaxe Stadium
- League: Series 1
- Website: gladsaxe-hero.dk

Gladsaxe-Hero Boldklub is a football club based in Gladsaxe Municipality, Denmark. The club currently competes in the Series 1.

== History ==
Gladsaxe-Hero Boldklub is a merger between Boldklubben Hero and Gladsaxe Boldklub in 1979, but the latter was formed (as Søborg Boldklub) on 11 January 1923.

In the early 1980s, Gladsaxe-Hero was regarded as one of Zealand's best football youth academies, but in the 1988–89 season, Gladsaxe-Hero moved out of the 3rd division, starting a long decline for the club with five relegations in six seasons. Both Peter Schmeichel and Dennis Rommedahl, the top two all-time most-capped players in Danish history, have played for the clubs youth academy.

In 2008, Gladsaxe-Hero signed a partnership agreement with Danish top flight side Brøndby. In 2021, the club won the Zealand championship in series 1, with a 2–1 victory over Herfølge, but moved down from the Zealand series to series 1 last season.

== Former players ==
- (Denmark) Peter Schmeichel
- (Denmark) Dennis Rommedahl
- (Denmark) Flemming Christensen
- (Denmark) Henrik Agerbeck
- (Afghanistan) Ovays Azizi
- (Denmark) Per Poulsen
