= Ballerup-Skovlunde Fodbold =

Association football club in Ballerup, Denmark

BSF
- Full name: Ballerup-Skovlunde Fodbold
- Founded: 2010; 15 years ago
- Ground: Ballerup Idrætspark, Ballerup
- Capacity: 3,000 (930 seated)
- Chairman: Michael Falcham
- Head coach: Anders Mikkelsen
- League: Denmark Series
- 2019–20: Denmark Series Group 1, 3rd
- Website: https://bsfodbold.dk/
Home colours

Ballerup-Skovlunde Fodbold, commonly known as BSF, is an association football club based in the town of Ballerup, Denmark, that competes in the Denmark Series, the fourth tier of the Danish football league system. Founded in 2010 as a merger between Ballerup Boldklub and Skovlunde IF, the club play at their home ground Ballerup Idrætspark. Their colours are red and white. BSF is affiliated to the local football association, DBU Zealand. The women's team is one of the strongest in Denmark, competing in the highest tier Elitedivisionen.
