= BK Herning Fremad =

Danish football club

- Full name: Boldklubben Herning Fremad
- Founded: 12 September 1918
- Ground: Kunstgræsbane 1
- Capacity: 1,000
- Manager: Svend Lund Larsen
- League: Jutland Series (V)
- Website: https://www.herningfremad.dk/

BK Herning Fremad is a Danish football club based in Herning, Jutland currently playing in the Jutland Series, the fifth tier of the Danish football league system.

== History ==
The club was founded in 1918. In 1999 FC Midtjylland was formed as a breakaway from Herning Fremad.
