= Frederikshavn fI =

Danish sports club

- Full name: Frederikshavn forenede Idrætsklubber
- Short name: FfI
- Founded: 1931
- Ground: Frederikshavn Stadion, Frederikshavn
- Capacity: 15,000
- Chairman: Christian Kærsgaard
- Manager: Frode Langagergaard
- League: Jutland Series
- 2007–08: Denmark Series Pool 2, 14th
Home colours	Away colours

Frederikshavn forenede Idrætsklubber (also known as FfI or Frederikshavn fI) is a Danish sports club based in Frederikshavn. The club has branches in football, handball, swimming, gymnastics and wrestling.

The football team spent a total five seasons in the top-flight Danish 1st Division during the 1960s and 1970s. Its most famous player through time is Harald Nielsen.

The handball team has previously loaned its license to both Frederikshavn FOX Team Nord and Vendsyssel Håndbold.

== Former players ==
- (Denmark) Frank Nielsen
