= 2011–12 Danish 2nd Divisions =

Danish 2nd Divisions
- Season: 2011–12

The 2011–12 Danish 2nd Divisions, beginning on 6 August 2011 and ending on 16 June 2012, will be the divided in two groups of sixteen teams. The two group winners will face each other for a single promotion spot in a two-legged play-off, rather than the normal three promotion spots, as decided in March 2010. This is done to reduce the First Division from 14 to 12 teams.

Because of an uneven distribution of West and East-teams (divided by the Great Belt), two East-teams, Lolland-Falster Alliancen and BK Skjold, were drawn into the West-division.

== Participants ==
Locations of the 2011–12 Danish 2nd Division teams (East-teams in red, west-teams in blue). Copenhagen teams: Avarta, B.93, B 1908, Fremad Amager, BGA, Herlev, HIK, Hvidovre, Skjold and Vanløse

Club	Group	Finishing position last season	First season of current spell in 2nd Divisions
Aarhus Fremad	West	2nd	2008–09
Aarup BK	West	2nd in Denmark Series Group 2	2011–12
Avarta	East	7th	2008–09
B.93	East	6th	2005–06
B 1908	East	8th (West)	2009–10
BGA	East	11th	1999–2000
Brabrand	West	6th	2010–11
Egedal	East	10th (as Stenløse BK)	2005–06
Elite 3000 Helsingør	East	2nd	2010–11
FC Fyn	West	15th in 1st Division	2011–12
FC Svendborg	West	7th	2008–09
Fremad Amager	East	2nd in Denmark Series Group 1	2011–12]
Herlev	East	9th	2010–11
HIK	East	3rd	2008–09
Hvidovre	East	16th in 1st Division	2011–12
IF Skjold Birkerød	East	1st in Denmark Series Group 1	2011–12
Kjellerup	West	1st in Denmark Series Group 3	2011–12
Lindholm	West	9th	2010–11
Lolland-Falster Alliancen	West	4th (East)	2009–10
Marienlyst	West	1st in Denmark Series Group 2	2011–12
Nordvest FC	East	1st	2009–10
Næsby	West	4th	2004–05
Otterup B&I	West	11th	2009–10
Rishøj	East	10th (West)	2010–11
Skjold	West	12th (East)	2006–07
Skovbakken	West	5th	2010–11
Svebølle	East	3rd in Denmark Series Group 1	2011–12
Søllerød-Vedbæk	East	5th	2005–06
Thisted	West	3rd	2010–11
Vanløse	East	8th	2007–08
Varde	West	12th	2005–06
Viby	West	2nd in Denmark Series Group 3	2011–12

== East ==
=== League table ===
Pos	Team	Pld	W	D	L	GF	GA	GD	Pts	Promotion or relegation
1	HIK	30	23	2	5	69	44	+25	71	Qualification to Promotion game
2	Hvidovre IF	30	21	3	6	79	36	+43	66	
3	Herlev	30	15	3	12	56	42	+14	48	
4	Rishøj BK	30	13	8	9	49	40	+9	47	
5	Fremad Amager	30	12	8	10	50	47	+3	44	
6	Svebølle B&I	30	12	7	11	54	55	−1	43	
7	B 1908	30	11	10	9	37	39	−2	43	
8	Nordvest FC	30	10	11	9	46	41	+5	41	
9	Elite 3000	30	12	5	13	51	54	−3	41	
10	Avarta	30	11	6	13	41	38	+3	39	
11	IF Skjold Birkerød	30	11	6	13	41	46	−5	39	
12	Søllerød-Vedbæk	30	11	6	13	38	43	−5	39	
13	Vanløse IF (R)	30	9	8	13	41	48	−7	35	Relegation to Denmark Series
14	B.93 (R)	30	8	9	13	37	44	−7	33	Relegation to Denmark Series
15	SC Egedal (R)	30	8	8	14	47	50	−3	32	Relegation to Denmark Series
16	BGA (R)	30	1	2	27	21	93	−72	5	Relegation to Denmark Series

Updated to match(es) played on 16 June 2012. Source: Danish FA
Rules for classification: 1) points; 2) goal difference; 3) number of goals scored.
(R) Relegated

== West ==
=== League table ===
Pos	Team	Pld	W	D	L	GF	GA	GD	Pts	Promotion or relegation
1	Fyn (P)	30	23	3	4	71	21	+50	72	Qualification to Promotion game
2	Næsby BK	30	22	4	4	77	29	+48	70	
3	Varde IF	30	14	13	3	42	27	+15	55	
4	Thisted FC	30	15	8	7	64	39	+25	53	
5	Aarhus Fremad	30	12	10	8	59	43	+16	46	
6	Marienlyst	30	12	9	9	56	55	+1	45	
7	FC Svendborg	30	10	13	7	50	39	+11	43	
8	Skovbakken IK	30	13	2	15	44	50	−6	41	
9	LFA	30	10	8	12	47	58	−11	38	
10	Kjellerup	30	9	9	12	39	43	−4	36	
11	Otterup B&I	30	8	9	13	42	64	−22	33	
12	Brabrand	30	8	8	14	36	40	−4	32	
13	Aarup BK (R)	30	7	8	15	38	66	−28	29	Relegation to Denmark Series
14	Lindholm IF (R)	30	7	7	16	32	62	−30	28	Relegation to Denmark Series
15	Skjold (R)	30	5	6	19	38	59	−21	21	Relegation to Denmark Series
16	Viby IF (R)	30	4	5	21	27	67	−40	17	Relegation to Denmark Series

Updated to match(es) played on 16 June 2012. Source: Danish FA
Rules for classification: 1) points; 2) goal difference; 3) number of goals scored.
(P) Promoted; (R) Relegated

== Play-offs ==
=== Promotion game ===
The two winners will play promotion game on home and away basis.

Team 1	Agg.	Team 2	1st leg	2nd leg
HIK	1–3	FC Fyn	1–1	0–2

==== Game details ====
First leg

20 June 2012
18:00

FC Fyn	1 – 1	HIK
Overgaard 44'		Davidsen 70' (o.g.)

Odense Atletikstadion
Attendance: 2,517
Referee: Jens Maae

Second leg

23 June 2012
13:00

HIK	0 – 2	FC Fyn
		Nautrup 1'; Johansen 65' (pen.)

Gentofte Stadion
Attendance: 1,448
Referee: Kenn Hansen
