= List of Boldklubben 1908 seasons =

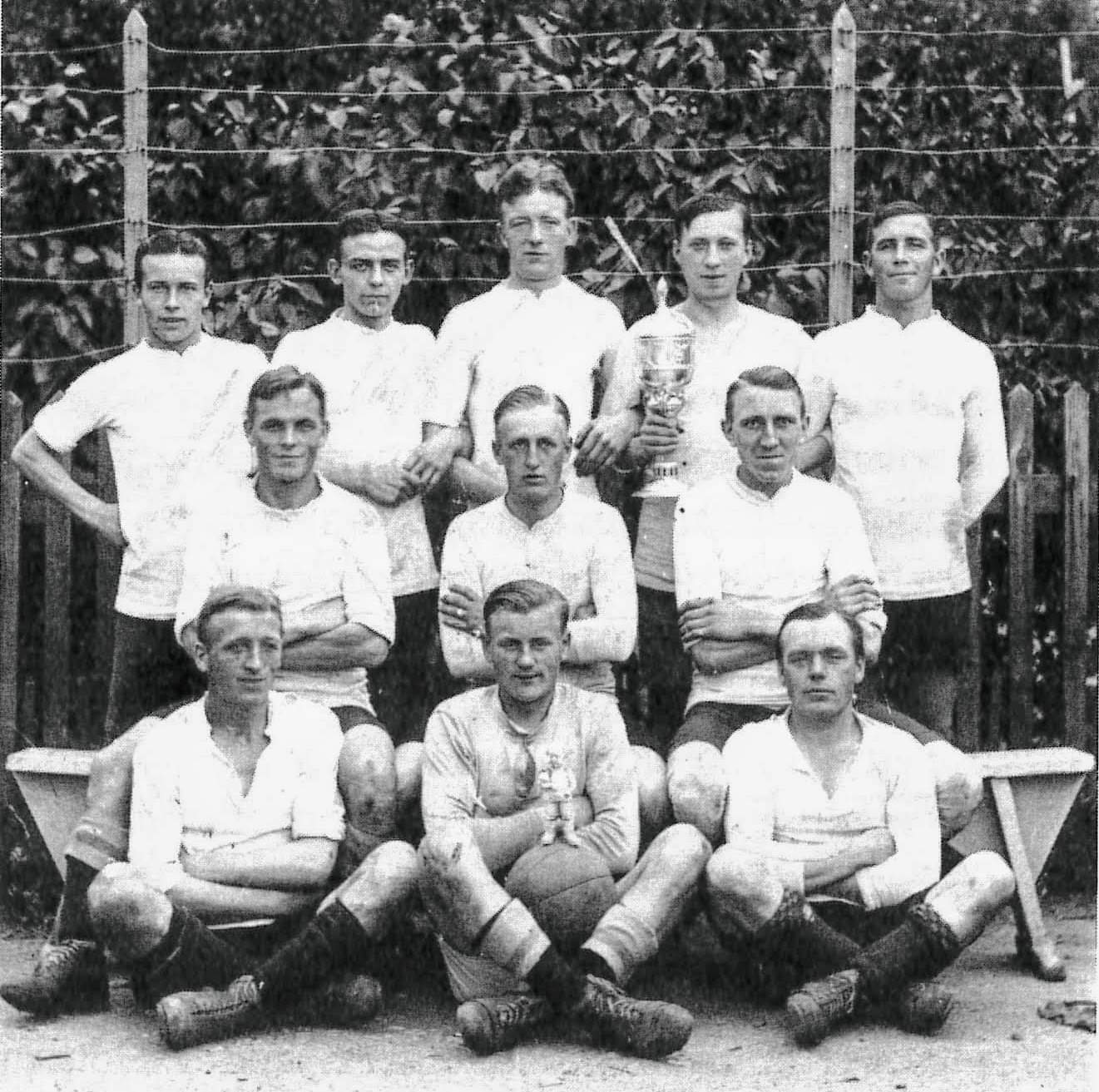
The Boldklubben 1908 line-up in the 1917 season displaying a trophy from a ABU league tournament.

Boldklubben 1908 is a Danish association football club based in Sundbyvester, Copenhagen. This list details the club's achievements in all competitive tournaments including the league's average attendance figures and top scorers from the founding of the club in May 1908 up to the most recent season. In 1912, the club joined Amager Boldspil-Union (ABU), joining their league and cup tournaments and later also participated in tournaments organised by the Københavns Forstadsklubbers Boldspil Union (KFBU). In the first 1912-season for seniors arranged by the new football association, Boldklubben 1908 won the regional league championship of Amager by going through the tournament undefeated. Their first competitive league match was played away in April 1912 against Boldklubben Fremad Amager, ending in a 13–0 win, as part of the first match in the official regional championship of Amager.

B 1908's first season in a nationwide league tournament, under the auspices of the Danish Football Association (DBU), was in 1932–33 second level, qualifying for the top flight league war tournament during the Second World War. They have since primarily played in lower ranking leagues below the divisions and in regional leagues, reaching the third national level in mid-1980s, late 1990s, including the seasons 2007–08, between 2009–10 and 2015–16. The club's debut in the KBUs Pokalturnering came in the 1924 edition, occasionally participating in the regional cup until the 1953 edition, when the tournament was replaced by the newly formed nationwide cup, DBUs Landspokalturnering.

== Key ==
Key to league competitions:

- Level 1: Danmarksmesterskabsturneringen (1927–1929), Mesterskabsserien (1929–1940), Danmarksturneringen (1940–1945), 1. division (1945–1990), Superligaen (1991–present)
- Level 2: Oprykningsserien (1929–1936), II. Serie (1936–1940), 2. division (1945–1990), Kvalifikationsligaen (1992s, 1993s, 1994s, 1995s), 1. division (1991–present)
- Level 3: III. Serie (1936–1940), 3. division (1945–1990), 2. division (1991–present)
- Level 4: Kvalifikationsturneringen (1959–1965), Danmarksserien for herrer (1966–1995), Kvalifikationsrækken (1996–2000), Danmarksserien for herrer (1966–present)
- Level 5: Danmarksseriens Kvalifikationsrække (2000–2008)
- Level 6 (Level 1 under DBU Copenhagen): KBUs Mesterskabsrække (1920–1936), KBUs A-række (1936–1947), Københavnsserien A / Københavnsserien B (1947–1977), Københavnsserien (1978–present)
- Level 7 (Level 2 under DBU Copenhagen): KBUs A-række (1920–1936), KBUs B-række (1936–1947), KBUs Mellemrække (1947–1984), KBUs Serie 1 (1985–2011), DBU København Serie 1 (2011–present)
- Level 8 (Level 3 under DBU Copenhagen): KBUs Deltagerturnering & KBUs Forstadsturnering (1920–21), KBUs B-række (1921–1936), KBUs C-række (1944–1947), KBUs A-række (1947–1984), KBUs Serie 2 (1985–2011), DBU København Serie 2 (2011–present)

Key to colours and symbols:

1st or W	Winners/Champions
2nd or RU	Runners-up
3rd	Third place
↑	Promoted
↓	Relegated
♦	Top scorer in division

Key to league record:

- Season = The year and article of the season
- Position = Final position in table
- Level = Level in the football league system
- P = Games played
- W = Games won
- D = Games drawn
- L = Games lost
- F = Goals scored
- A = Goals against
- Pts = Points

Key to cup record:

- En-dash (–) = Did not participate
- DSQ = Disqualified
- DNE = Did not enter cup play
- QR1 = First qualification round, etc.
- GS = Group stage
- GS2 = Second group stage
- R1 = First round, etc.
- R16 = Round of 16
- QF = Quarter-finals
- SF = Semi-finals
- RU = Runners-up
- W = Winners

== Seasons ==
Results of league and cup competitions by season.

Season		League										Cup	Europe / Other		Avg. Home Attendance (Note: Only league games are counted, not including championship replays, promotion and relegation play-off matches.)	Top goalscorer(s)		Refs
Season		Level	Division	P	W	D	L	F	A	Pts	Position	Cup	Competition	Result	Avg. Home Attendance	Name	Goals	Refs
1908		The club did not start playing organised league football until 1912.										The club only participated in friendly matches for its first seasons.						—N/a
1909		The club did not start playing organised league football until 1912.										The club only participated in friendly matches for its first seasons.						—N/a
1910		The club did not start playing organised league football until 1912.										The club only participated in friendly matches for its first seasons.						—N/a
1911		The club did not start playing organised league football until 1912.										The club only participated in friendly matches for its first seasons.						—N/a
1912		1	ABUs Amager-Turnering	6	6	0	0	—N/a	—N/a	10	1st of 4	—	—N/a	—N/a	—N/a	—N/a	—N/a	—N/a
1913		—N/a	—N/a	—N/a	—N/a	—N/a	—N/a	—N/a	—N/a	—N/a	—N/a	—	—N/a	—N/a	—N/a	—N/a	—N/a	—N/a
1914		—N/a	—N/a	—N/a	—N/a	—N/a	—N/a	—N/a	—N/a	—N/a	—N/a	—	—N/a	—N/a	—N/a	—N/a	—N/a	—N/a
1915		—N/a	—N/a	—N/a	—N/a	—N/a	—N/a	—N/a	—N/a	—N/a	—N/a	—	—N/a	—N/a	—N/a	—N/a	—N/a	—N/a
1915–16		—N/a	—N/a	—N/a	—N/a	—N/a	—N/a	—N/a	—N/a	—N/a	—N/a	—	—N/a	—N/a	—N/a	—N/a	—N/a	—N/a
1916–17		—N/a	—N/a	—N/a	—N/a	—N/a	—N/a	—N/a	—N/a	—N/a	—N/a	—	—N/a	—N/a	—N/a	—N/a	—N/a	—N/a
1917–18		—N/a	—N/a	—N/a	—N/a	—N/a	—N/a	—N/a	—N/a	—N/a	—N/a	—	—N/a	—N/a	—N/a	—N/a	—N/a	—N/a
1918–19		—N/a	—N/a	—N/a	—N/a	—N/a	—N/a	—N/a	—N/a	—N/a	—N/a	—	—N/a	—N/a	—N/a	—N/a	—N/a	—N/a
1919–20		—N/a	—N/a	—N/a	—N/a	—N/a	—N/a	—N/a	—N/a	—N/a	—N/a	—	—N/a	—N/a	—N/a	—N/a	—N/a	—N/a
1920–21		3	KBUs Forstadsturnering	12	—N/a	—N/a	—N/a	38	13	21	2nd of 13	—	—N/a	—N/a	—N/a	—N/a	—N/a	
1921–22		3	KBUs B-række	—N/a	—N/a	—N/a	—N/a	—N/a	—N/a	—N/a	—N/a	—	—N/a	—N/a	—N/a	—N/a	—N/a	—N/a
1922–23		3	KBUs B-række	—N/a	—N/a	—N/a	—N/a	—N/a	—N/a	—N/a	—N/a	—	—N/a	—N/a	—N/a	—N/a	—N/a	—N/a
1923–24		2	KBUs A-række	9	7	1	1	22	9	15	2nd of 10	—	—N/a	—N/a	—N/a	—N/a	—N/a	
1924–25		2	KBUs A-række	10	5	1	4	20	18	11	6th of 11	—	KBUs Pokalturnering	R1	—N/a	—N/a	—N/a	
1925–26		2	KBUs A-række	—N/a	—N/a	—N/a	—N/a	—N/a	—N/a	—N/a	—N/a	—	—N/a	—N/a	—N/a	—N/a	—N/a	—N/a
1926–27		2	KBUs A-række	10	5	1	4	31	25	11	5th of 11	—	—N/a	—N/a	—N/a	—N/a	—N/a	—N/a
1927–28		3	KBUs A-række	10	4	3	3	29	27	11	4th of 11	—	—N/a	—N/a	—N/a	Hemming Nielsen	16 ♦	
1928–29		3	KBUs A-række	—N/a	—N/a	—N/a	—N/a	—N/a	—N/a	—N/a	—N/a	—	—N/a	—N/a	—N/a	—N/a	—N/a	—N/a
1929–30		4	KBUs A-række	—N/a	—N/a	—N/a	—N/a	—N/a	—N/a	—N/a	—N/a	—	—N/a	—N/a	—N/a	—N/a	—N/a	—N/a
1930–31		4	KBUs A-række	—N/a	—N/a	—N/a	—N/a	—N/a	—N/a	—N/a	—N/a	—	—N/a	—N/a	—N/a	—N/a	—N/a	—N/a
1931–32		4	KBUs A-række	—N/a	—N/a	—N/a	—N/a	—N/a	—N/a	—N/a	—N/a	—	—N/a	—N/a	—N/a	—N/a	—N/a	—N/a
1932–33		2	Oprykningsserien, Østkredsen	5	4	1	0	24	4	9	1st of 6 Lost promotion playoffs	—	—N/a	—N/a	—N/a	—N/a	—N/a	
1932–33		4	KBUs A-række	—N/a	—N/a	—N/a	—N/a	—N/a	—N/a	—N/a	—N/a	—	—N/a	—N/a	—N/a	—N/a	—N/a	—N/a
1933–34		2	Oprykningsserien, Østkredsen	5	2	3	0	15	9	7	2nd of 6	—	—N/a	—N/a	—N/a	—N/a	—N/a	
1933–34		4	KBUs A-række	—N/a	—N/a	—N/a	—N/a	—N/a	—N/a	—N/a	—N/a	—	KBUs Pokalturnering	R2	—N/a	—N/a	—N/a	
1934–35		2	Oprykningsserien, Østkredsen	5	2	1	2	12	10	5	4th of 6	—	—N/a	—N/a	—N/a	—N/a	—N/a	
1934–35		4	KBUs A-række	—N/a	—N/a	—N/a	—N/a	—N/a	—N/a	—N/a	—N/a	—	—N/a	—N/a	—N/a	—N/a	—N/a	—N/a
1935–36		2	Oprykningsserien, Østkredsen	6	4	2	0	25	8	10	1st of 7 Lost promotion playoffs	—	—N/a	—N/a	—N/a	—N/a	—N/a	
1935–36		3	KBUs Mesterskabsrække	—N/a	—N/a	—N/a	—N/a	—N/a	—N/a	—N/a	—N/a	—	—N/a	—N/a	—N/a	—N/a	—N/a	—N/a
1936–37		2	II Serie	18	7	3	8	31	52	17	8th of 10	—	KBUs Pokalturnering	R1	—N/a	—N/a	—N/a	
1937–38		2	II Serie	18	8	4	6	38	37	20	3rd of 10	—	KBUs Pokalturnering	R1	—N/a	Emanuel Holm	21	
1938–39		2	II Serie	18	8	3	7	35	41	19	6th of 10	—	KBUs Pokalturnering	R2	—N/a	Emanuel Holm	17	
1939–40		2	II Serie	18	10	1	7	45	41	21	3rd of 10	—	—N/a	—N/a	—N/a	—N/a	—N/a	
1940–41		1	Danmarksturneringen, kreds II	12	4	0	8	22	39	8	5th of 7	—	—N/a	—N/a	—N/a	—N/a	—N/a	
1941–42		1	Danmarksturneringen, kreds II	18	9	3	6	57	40	21	5th of 10	—	—N/a	—N/a	—N/a	—N/a	—N/a	
1942–43		1	Danmarksturneringen, kreds II	18	9	3	6	40	29	21	4th of 10	—	—N/a	—N/a	—N/a	Bjarne Hauger	8	
1943–44		1	Danmarksturneringen, kreds II Kvalifikation til Danmarksturneringen, Kreds II	18 3	2 1	4 0	12 2	21 4	50 9	8 2	10th of 10 4th of 4 ↓	—	—N/a	—N/a	—N/a	—N/a	—N/a	
1944–45		2	KBUs A-række	—N/a	—N/a	—N/a	—N/a	—N/a	—N/a	—N/a	—N/a	—	—N/a	—N/a	—N/a	—N/a	—N/a	—N/a
1945–46		4	KBUs A-række Kvalifikations-Cupturneringen	n/a 1	n/a 0	n/a 0	n/a 1	n/a 0	n/a 1	n/a —	n/a Semi-final	—	—N/a	—N/a	—N/a	—N/a	—N/a	
1946–47		4	KBUs A-række	—N/a	—N/a	—N/a	—N/a	—N/a	—N/a	—N/a	—N/a	—	—N/a	—N/a	—N/a	—N/a	—N/a	—N/a
1947–48		4	Københavnsserien A	—N/a	—N/a	—N/a	—N/a	—N/a	—N/a	—N/a	—N/a	—	KBUs Pokalturnering	R1	—N/a	—N/a	—N/a	
1948–49		4	Københavnsserien A	—N/a	—N/a	—N/a	—N/a	—N/a	—N/a	—N/a	—N/a	—	—N/a	—N/a	—N/a	—N/a	—N/a	—N/a
1949–50		4	Københavnsserien A	—N/a	—N/a	—N/a	—N/a	—N/a	—N/a	—N/a	—N/a	—	KBUs Pokalturnering	R2	—N/a	—N/a	—N/a	
1950–51		4	Københavnsserien A	—N/a	—N/a	—N/a	—N/a	—N/a	—N/a	—N/a	—N/a	—	KBUs Pokalturnering	R4	—N/a	—N/a	—N/a	
1951–52		4	Københavnsserien A	—N/a	—N/a	—N/a	—N/a	—N/a	—N/a	—N/a	—N/a	—	—N/a	—N/a	—N/a	—N/a	—N/a	—N/a
1952–53		4	Københavnsserien A	—N/a	—N/a	—N/a	—N/a	—N/a	—N/a	—N/a	—N/a	—	KBUs Pokalturnering	R3	—N/a	—N/a	—N/a	
1953–54		4	Københavnsserien A	—N/a	—N/a	—N/a	—N/a	—N/a	—N/a	—N/a	—N/a	—	—N/a	—N/a	—N/a	—N/a	—N/a	—N/a
1954–55		4	Københavnsserien A	—N/a	—N/a	—N/a	—N/a	—N/a	—N/a	—N/a	—N/a	—N/a	—N/a	—N/a	—N/a	—N/a	—N/a	—N/a
1955–56		4	Københavnsserien A Kvalifikationsturneringen	n/a 6	n/a 0	n/a 3	n/a 3	n/a 7	n/a 14	n/a 3	n/a 7th of 7	—N/a	—N/a	—N/a	—N/a	—N/a	—N/a	
1956–57	a-s	4	Københavnsserien A	N/A	N/A	N/A	N/A	N/A	N/A	N/A	N/A	R3	N/A		N/A	N/A	N/A	
1956–57	a	4	Københavnsserien A	N/A	N/A	N/A	N/A	N/A	N/A	N/A	N/A	N/A	—		N/A	N/A	N/A	
1958	s	4	Københavnsserien A	N/A	N/A	N/A	N/A	N/A	N/A	N/A	N/A	N/A	—		N/A	N/A	N/A	N/A
1958	a	4	Københavnsserien A	N/A	N/A	N/A	N/A	N/A	N/A	N/A	N/A	N/A	—		N/A	N/A	N/A	N/A
1959	s	4	Kvalifikationsturneringen	22	8	4	10	58	51	20	6th of 12 ↓	N/A	—		N/A	N/A	N/A	
1959	a	4	Kvalifikationsturneringen	22	8	4	10	58	51	20	6th of 12 ↓	R1	—		N/A	N/A	N/A	
1960	s	5	Københavnsserien A	N/A	N/A	N/A	N/A	N/A	N/A	N/A	N/A	R1	—		N/A	N/A	N/A	N/A
1960	a	5	Københavnsserien A	N/A	N/A	N/A	N/A	N/A	N/A	N/A	N/A	N/A	—		N/A	N/A	N/A	N/A
1961	s	5	Københavnsserien A	18	7	4	7	32	29	18	5th of 10	N/A	—		N/A	N/A	N/A	
1961	a	5	Københavnsserien A	18	7	4	7	32	29	18	5th of 10	R1	—		N/A	N/A	N/A	
1962	s	5	Københavnsserien A	N/A	N/A	N/A	N/A	N/A	N/A	N/A	N/A	R1	—		N/A	N/A	N/A	N/A
1962	a	5	Københavnsserien A	N/A	N/A	N/A	N/A	N/A	N/A	N/A	N/A	N/A	—		N/A	N/A	N/A	N/A
1963	s	5	Københavnsserien A	18	9	8	1	38	18	26	2nd of 10	N/A	—		N/A	N/A	N/A	
1963	a	5	Københavnsserien A	18	9	8	1	38	18	26	2nd of 10	R1	—		N/A	N/A	N/A	
1964	s	5	Københavnsserien A	18	8	7	3	43	25	23	3rd of 10	R1	—		N/A	N/A	N/A	
1964	a	5	Københavnsserien A	18	8	7	3	43	25	23	3rd of 10	N/A	—		N/A	N/A	N/A	
1965	s	5	Københavnsserien A	22	4	8	10	34	42	16	10th of 12	N/A	—		N/A	N/A	N/A	
1965	a	5	Københavnsserien A	22	4	8	10	34	42	16	10th of 12	N/A	—		N/A	N/A	N/A	
1966	s	5	Københavnsserien A	22	14	0	8	35	30	28	4th of 12	N/A	—		N/A	N/A	N/A	
1966	a	5	Københavnsserien A	22	14	0	8	35	30	28	4th of 12	N/A	—		N/A	N/A	N/A	
1967	s	5	Københavnsserien A	N/A	N/A	N/A	N/A	N/A	N/A	N/A	N/A	N/A	—		N/A	N/A	N/A	
1967	a	5	Københavnsserien A	N/A	N/A	N/A	N/A	N/A	N/A	N/A	N/A	R1	—		N/A	N/A	N/A	
1968	s	5	Københavnsserien A	N/A	N/A	N/A	N/A	N/A	N/A	N/A	N/A	R1	—		N/A	N/A	N/A	N/A
1968	a	5	Københavnsserien A	N/A	N/A	N/A	N/A	N/A	N/A	N/A	N/A	N/A	—		N/A	N/A	N/A	N/A
1969	s	5	Københavnsserien A	N/A	N/A	N/A	N/A	N/A	N/A	N/A	N/A	N/A	—		N/A	N/A	N/A	N/A
1969	a	5	Københavnsserien A	N/A	N/A	N/A	N/A	N/A	N/A	N/A	N/A	N/A	—		N/A	N/A	N/A	N/A
1970	s	5	Københavnsserien A	N/A	N/A	N/A	N/A	N/A	N/A	N/A	N/A	N/A	—		N/A	N/A	N/A	N/A
1970	a	5	Københavnsserien A	N/A	N/A	N/A	N/A	N/A	N/A	N/A	N/A	N/A	—		N/A	N/A	N/A	N/A
1971	s	5	Københavnsserien A	N/A	N/A	N/A	N/A	N/A	N/A	N/A	N/A	N/A	—		N/A	N/A	N/A	N/A
1971	a	5	Københavnsserien A	N/A	N/A	N/A	N/A	N/A	N/A	N/A	N/A	N/A	—		N/A	N/A	N/A	N/A
1972	s	5	Københavnsserien A	N/A	N/A	N/A	N/A	N/A	N/A	N/A	N/A	N/A	—		N/A	N/A	N/A	
1972	a	5	Københavnsserien A	N/A	N/A	N/A	N/A	N/A	N/A	N/A	N/A	R1	—		N/A	N/A	N/A	
1973	s	5	Københavnsserien A	N/A	N/A	N/A	N/A	N/A	N/A	N/A	N/A	R1	—		N/A	N/A	N/A	N/A
1973	a	5	Københavnsserien A	N/A	N/A	N/A	N/A	N/A	N/A	N/A	N/A	N/A	—		N/A	N/A	N/A	N/A
1974	s	5	Københavnsserien A	N/A	N/A	N/A	N/A	N/A	N/A	N/A	N/A	N/A	—		N/A	N/A	N/A	N/A
1974	a	5	Københavnsserien A	N/A	N/A	N/A	N/A	N/A	N/A	N/A	N/A	N/A	—		N/A	N/A	N/A	N/A
1975	s	5	Københavnsserien A	N/A	N/A	N/A	N/A	N/A	N/A	N/A	N/A	N/A	—		N/A	N/A	N/A	N/A
1975	a	5	Københavnsserien A	N/A	N/A	N/A	N/A	N/A	N/A	N/A	N/A	N/A	—		N/A	N/A	N/A	N/A
1976	s	5	Københavnsserien A	N/A	N/A	N/A	N/A	N/A	N/A	N/A	N/A	N/A	—		N/A	N/A	N/A	
1976	a	5	Københavnsserien A	N/A	N/A	N/A	N/A	N/A	N/A	N/A	N/A	R1	—		N/A	N/A	N/A	
1977	s	5	Københavnsserien A	N/A	N/A	N/A	N/A	N/A	N/A	N/A	N/A	R1	—		N/A	N/A	N/A	N/A
1977	a	5	Københavnsserien A	N/A	N/A	N/A	N/A	N/A	N/A	N/A	N/A	N/A	—		N/A	N/A	N/A	N/A
1978	s	5	Københavnsserien	N/A	N/A	N/A	N/A	N/A	N/A	N/A	N/A	N/A	—		N/A	N/A	N/A	N/A
1978	a	5	Københavnsserien	N/A	N/A	N/A	N/A	N/A	N/A	N/A	N/A	N/A	—		N/A	N/A	N/A	N/A
1979	s	5	Københavnsserien	26	11	8	5	43	31	30	4th of 14	N/A	—		N/A	N/A	N/A	
1979	a	5	Københavnsserien	26	11	8	5	43	31	30	4th of 14	R1	—		N/A	N/A	N/A	
1980	s	5	Københavnsserien	22	11	6	5	37	31	28	3rd of 12	R1	—		N/A	N/A	N/A	
1980	a	5	Københavnsserien	22	11	6	5	37	31	28	3rd of 12	N/A	—		N/A	N/A	N/A	
1981	s	5	Københavnsserien	22	11	3	8	42	37	25	5th of 12	N/A	—		N/A	N/A	N/A	
1981	a	5	Københavnsserien	22	11	3	8	42	37	25	5th of 12	N/A	—		N/A	N/A	N/A	
1982	s	5	Københavnsserien	24	15	6	3	45	23	36	1st of 13 ↑	N/A	—		N/A	Per Bøgekær	15	
1982	a	5	Københavnsserien	24	15	6	3	45	23	36	1st of 13 ↑	R2	—		N/A	Per Bøgekær	15	
1983	s	4	Danmarksserien, pulje 1	22	11	7	4	36	22	29	1st of 12 ↑	R2	—		225	Per Bøgekær	11	
1983	a	4	Danmarksserien, pulje 1	22	11	7	4	36	22	29	1st of 12 ↑	R1	Danmarksseriemesterskabet	RU	225	Per Bøgekær	11	
1984	s	3	3. division	30	5	9	16	25	60	19	16th of 16 ↓	R1	Danmarksseriemesterskabet	RU	N/A	N/A	N/A	
1984	a	3	3. division	30	5	9	16	25	60	19	16th of 16 ↓	R1	—		N/A	N/A	N/A	
1985	s	4	Danmarksserien, pulje 1	22	9	7	6	35	25	25	6th of 12 ↑	R1	—		N/A	N/A	N/A	
1985	a	4	Danmarksserien, pulje 1	22	9	7	6	35	25	25	6th of 12 ↑	N/A	—		N/A	N/A	N/A	
1986	s	3	3. division øst	26	2	6	18	21	65	10	14th of 14 ↓	N/A	—		N/A	N/A	N/A	
1986	a	3	3. division øst	26	2	6	18	21	65	10	14th of 14 ↓	R1	Carlsberg Grand Prix	GS	N/A	N/A	N/A	
1987	s	4	Danmarksserien, pulje 1	26	3	4	19	29	103	10	13th of 14 ↓	R1	Carlsberg Grand Prix	GS	N/A	N/A	N/A	
1987	a	4	Danmarksserien, pulje 1	26	3	4	19	29	103	10	13th of 14 ↓	R1	—		N/A	N/A	N/A	
1988	s	5	Københavnsserien	22	7	5	10	29	39	19	12th of 14	R1	—		N/A	N/A	N/A	
1988	a	5	Københavnsserien	22	7	5	10	29	39	19	12th of 14	N/A	—		N/A	N/A	N/A	
1989	s	5	Københavnsserien	26	12	4	10	37	33	28	4th of 14	N/A	—		N/A	N/A	N/A	
1989	a	5	Københavnsserien	26	12	4	10	37	33	28	4th of 14	N/A	—		N/A	N/A	N/A	
1990	s	5	Københavnsserien	26	5	4	17	32	56	14	13th of 14 ↓	N/A	—		N/A	N/A	N/A	
1990	a	5	Københavnsserien	26	5	4	17	32	56	14	13th of 14 ↓	N/A	—		N/A	N/A	N/A	
1991	s	6	KBUs Serie 1, kreds 2	22	10	6	6	55	42	26	4th of 12	N/A	—		N/A	N/A	N/A	
1991	a	6	KBUs Serie 1, kreds 2	22	10	6	6	55	42	26	4th of 12	N/A	—		N/A	N/A	N/A	
1992	s	7→6	KBUs Serie 1, kreds 2	22	17	3	2	66	27	37	1st of 12 ↑	N/A	—		N/A	N/A	N/A	
1992	a	7→6	KBUs Serie 1, kreds 2	22	17	3	2	66	27	37	1st of 12 ↑	R1	—		N/A	N/A	N/A	
1993	s	6→5	Københavnsserien	26	18	4	4	72	29	40	2nd of 14 ↑	R1	—		N/A	N/A	N/A	
1993	a	6→5	Københavnsserien	26	18	4	4	72	29	40	2nd of 14 ↑	N/A	—		N/A	N/A	N/A	
1994	s	5→4	Danmarksserien, pulje 2	30	11	8	11	45	58	30	7th of 16	N/A	—		N/A	N/A	N/A	
1994	a	5→4	Danmarksserien, pulje 2	30	11	8	11	45	58	30	7th of 16	N/A	—		N/A	N/A	N/A	
1995 (Note: Changes to the structure of the Danmarksturneringen i fodbold meant that the four group's league leaders after the conclusion of the spring season in 1995 were promoted to the 2nd Division, while the remaining 15 teams of each group finished the rest of the season.)	a	5→4	Danmarksserien, pulje 1	29	17	7	5	78	42	58	1st of 15 ↑	N/A	—		N/A	Lars Olesen	14	
1995	s	5→4	Danmarksserien, pulje 1	29	17	7	5	78	42	58	1st of 15 ↑	R3	Danmarksseriemesterskabet	SF	N/A	Lars Olesen	14	
1996 spring		3	2. division øst	14	5	2	7	17	25	17	5th of 8	R3	Danmarksseriemesterskabet	SF	235	—N/a	—N/a	
1996 fall		3	2. division øst	14	4	3	7	35	31	15	5th of 8	R2	—		217	Robert Skibsted	16	
1997 spring		3	2. division øst	14	3	3	8	12	35	12	7th of 8	R2	—		—N/a	—N/a	—N/a	
1997–98		3	2. division	30	10	8	12	43	54	38	9th of 16	R3	—		—N/a	—N/a	—N/a	
1998–99		3	2. division	30	5	7	18	42	79	22	15th of 16 ↓	R1	—		229	Kasper Såby	12	
1999 fall		4	Kvalifikationsrækken	14	2	6	6	13	28	12	8th of 8	R3	—		—N/a	—N/a	—N/a	
2000 spring		4	Danmarksserien, pulje 1	13	0	2	11	3	25	2	14th of 14 ↓	R3	—		—N/a	—N/a	—N/a	
2000 fall		5	Danmarksseriens Kvalifikationsrække, pulje 1	14	7	3	4	38	29	24	5th of 8	N/A	—		—N/a	—N/a	—N/a	
2001 spring		5	Danmarksseriens Kvalifikationsrække, pulje 2	14	6	1	7	32	29	19	4th of 8 ↑	N/A	—		—N/a	—N/a	—N/a	
2001–02		4	Danmarksserien, pulje 2	30	8	5	17	34	76	29	12th of 16	—N/a	—		—N/a	—N/a	—N/a	
2002–03		4	Danmarksserien, pulje 2	30	10	3	17	43	75	33	13th of 16 ↓	R2	—		—N/a	—N/a	—N/a	
2003 fall		5	Danmarksseriens Kvalifikationsrække, pulje 1	14	8	3	3	42	27	27	2nd of 8	R1	—		—N/a	—N/a	—N/a	
2004 spring		5	Danmarksseriens Kvalifikationsrække, pulje 1	14	7	3	4	29	18	24	4th of 8 ↑	R1	—		—N/a	—N/a	—N/a	
2004–05		4	Danmarksserien, pulje 1	30	12	6	12	54	62	42	6th of 16	R1	—		—N/a	—N/a	—N/a	
2005–06		4	Danmarksserien, pulje 1	30	16	3	11	69	55	51	3rd of 16; Lost promotion playoffs	QR3	—		—N/a	Martin Henriksen	12	
2006–07		4	Danmarksserien, pulje 1	30	17	3	10	62	46	54	3rd of 16 ↑	QR4	—		—N/a	Martin Henriksen	22 ♦	
2007–08		3	2. division øst	30	7	4	19	44	62	25	15th of 16 ↓	QR3	—		338	Lasse Damstoft	7	
2008–09		4	Danmarksserien, pulje 1	26	18	3	5	60	24	57	1st of 14 ↑	R2	—		—N/a	Martin Skov Petersen	17	
2009–10		3	2. division øst	30	8	5	17	35	54	29	14th of 16	R2	—		256	Lasse Hessner Larsen	7	
2010–11		3	2. division vest	30	10	6	14	40	42	36	8th of 16	R2	—		244	Jackie Holbek Christensen	11	
2011–12		3	2. division øst	30	12	9	9	37	38	45	5th of 16	R2	—		348	Lasse Damstoft	7	
2012–13		3	2. division øst	30	13	12	5	46	41	51	6th of 16	R1	—		380	Thomas Overgaard Christiansen	15	
2013–14		3	2. division øst	30	15	5	10	46	36	50	5th of 16	R2	—		363	Thomas Overgaard Christiansen	12	
2014–15		3	2. division øst	30	8	13	9	42	36	37	10th of 16	R3	—		380	Øssur Dalbud; Søren From Haustein; Martin Lisborg	4	
2015–16	a	3	2. division, pulje 1	14	2	4	8	18	28	10	8th of 8	R2	—		255	Casper Offenberg	8	
2015–16	s	3	2. division, kvalifikationsspil	22	4	4	14	26	54	16	12th of 12 ↓	R2	—		205	Casper Offenberg	5	
2016–17		4	Danmarksserien, pulje 2	27	10	6	11	40	39	36	5th of 10	R2	—		—N/a	Kristian Drejer Larsen	16	
2017–18		4	Danmarksserien, pulje 2	27	16	3	8	54	28	51	3rd of 10	QR4	—		—N/a	Patrick Bielefeldt Pedersen; Kristian Drejer Larsen	9	
2018–19		4	Danmarksserien, pulje 2	27	14	5	8	55	41	47	3rd of 10	R3	—		—N/a	Thomas Overgaard Christiansen	10	
2019–20 (Note: The 2019–20 season was affected by the COVID-19 pandemic in Denmark. The matches in the spring calendar was abandoned with only the top two teams in each group from the final standings of fall season continuing in a play-off format for four promotion spots.)		4	Danmarksserien, pulje 2	14	9	2	3	24	14	29	3rd of 10	R2	—		—N/a	Kristian Drejer Larsen	5	
2020–21		4	Danmarksserien, pulje 2	20	10	4	6	35	24	34	5th of 11	R1	—		32 (Note: The 2020–21 season's home attendance average was severely affected by the COVID-19 pandemic in Denmark. While the season opened with spectators in the fall of 2020, the subsequent restrictions in the in early September and the winter lockdown meant that all matches from matchday 6 (3 October 2020) until matchday 20 (19 May 2021) were played behind closed doors, with only the play-off games allowing a reduced stadium capacity.) (Note: Match data from 1 home league game, against Herlev Fodbold (5 September 2020), is missing and have not been included in the average attendance.)	Kristian Drejer Larsen; Mikkel Vittarp Gøling	5	
2020–21		4	Danmarksserien, nedrykningsspil, pulje 1	27	14	5	8	50	34	47	1st of 14	R1	—		204	Mads Bukhave	5	
2021–22		5	Danmarksserien, pulje 2	27	9	7	11	40	38	34	5th of 10	R1	—		285	Patrick Bielefeldt Pedersen	10	
2022–23		5	Danmarksserien, pulje 1	18	2	7	9	26	38	13	9th of 10	QR4	—		271	David Chernet (Note: David Chernet scored six goals in the preliminary round and an additional goal in the qualification round, bringing his season total to seven. Mikkel Knudstrup scored all four of his goals in the qualification round.)	6	
2022–23		5	Danmarksserien, kvalifikationsspil, pulje 1	14	9	3	2	48	55	43	4th of 8	QR4	—		288	Mikkel Knudstrup	4	
2023–24		5	Danmarksserien, pulje 2	18	5	3	10	20	29	18	8th of 10	R2	—		218	Mikkel Knudstrup (Note: Mikkel Knudstrup scored five goals in the preliminary round and one additional goal in the qualification round, bringing his season total to six. Lasse Linnemann Johansson scored all five of his goals in the qualification round. Christian August Rosenmeier Dalgas scored seven goals during the season: four in the preliminary round and three in the qualification round.)	5	
2023–24		5	Danmarksserien, kvalifikationsspil, pulje 1	28	9	8	11	45	49	35	2nd of 10	R2	—		207	Lasse Linnemann Johansson	5	
2024–25		5	Danmarksserien, pulje 1	18	2	4	12	17	32	10	10th of 10	R2	—		195	Shimal Ado (Note: Shimal Ado scored eight goals in the preliminary round and an additional goal in the qualification round, bringing his season total to nine. Thomas Vilhelm Tranberg scored all three of his goals in the qualification round.)	8	
2024–25		5	Danmarksserien, kvalifikationsspil, pulje 1	28	4	7	17	31	52	19	10th of 10 ↓	R2	—		195	Thomas Vilhelm Tranberg	3	
2025–26		6	Københavnsserien	26	19	2	5	81	38	59	2nd of 14; Lost promotion playoffs	QR3	—		196	Shimal Ado	17	
2026–27		6	Københavnsserien									QR4	—					
