= 2012–13 Danish 2nd Divisions =

Danish 2nd Divisions
- Season: 2012–13

The 2012–13 Danish 2nd Divisions in the game of football will be divided in two groups of sixteen teams. The two group winners will be promoted to the 2013–14 Danish 1st Division.

Because of an uneven distribution of West and East-teams (divided by the Great Belt), one East-team, BK Søllerød-Vedbæk, was drawn into the West-division.

== Participants ==
Locations of the 2012–13 Danish 2nd Division teams (East-teams in red, west-teams in blue). Copenhagen teams: Avarta, B 1908, Frem, Fremad Amager, Herlev, HIK, and Hvidovre

Club	Group	Finishing position last season	First season of current spell in 2nd Divisions
Aarhus Fremad	West	5th	2008–09
Avarta	East	10th	2008–09
B 1908	East	7th	2009–10
Blokhus FC	West	14th in 1st Division	2012–13
Brabrand	West	12th	2010–11
FC Helsingør	East	9th	2010–11
FC Roskilde	East	12th in 1st Division	2012–13
FC Skanderborg	West	1st in Denmark Series Group 3	2012–13
FC Svendborg	West	7th	2008–09
FC Sydvest 05	West	2nd in Denmark Series Group 2	2012–13
Frem	East	1st in Denmark Series Group 1	2012–13
Fremad Amager	East	5th	2011–12
Herlev	East	3rd	2010–11
HIK	East	1st	2008–09
Hvidovre	East	2nd	2011–12
IF Skjold Birkerød	East	11th	2011–12
Kjellerup	West	10th	2011–12
Lolland-Falster Alliancen	East	9th (West)	2009–10
Marienlyst	West	6th	2011–12
Middelfart	West	1st in Denmark Series Group 2	2012–13
NB Bornholm	East	2nd in Denmark Series Group 1	2012–13
Nordvest FC	East	8th	2009–10
Næsby	West	2nd	2004–05
Næstved	East	13th in 1st Division	2012–13
Otterup B&I	West	11th	2009–10
Ringkøbing	West	2nd in Denmark Series Group 3	2012–13
Rishøj	East	4th	2010–11
Skovbakken	West	8th	2010–11
Svebølle	East	6th	2011–12
Søllerød-Vedbæk	West	12th (East)	2005–06
Thisted	West	4th	2010–11
Varde	West	3rd	2005–06

== East ==
Pos	Team	Pld	W	D	L	GF	GA	GD	Pts	Promotion or relegation
1	Hvidovre IF (P)	30	22	3	5	85	31	+54	69	Promotion to Danish 1st Division
2	Helsingør	30	20	4	6	79	38	+41	64	
3	Rishøj BK	30	18	6	6	50	29	+21	60	
4	Næstved BK	30	17	8	5	64	32	+32	59	
5	HIK	30	15	6	9	58	46	+12	51	
6	B 1908	30	13	12	5	46	41	+5	51	
7	Frem	30	14	6	10	45	40	+5	48	
8	FC Roskilde	30	13	7	10	52	41	+11	46	
9	Nordvest FC	30	12	8	10	51	49	+2	44	
10	LFA	30	10	6	14	48	59	−11	36	
11	Avarta	30	9	6	15	39	47	−8	33	
12	Svebølle B&I	30	8	7	15	37	61	−24	31	
13	IF Skjold Birkerød	30	8	5	17	44	65	−21	29	
14	Fremad Amager (O)	30	6	5	19	39	59	−20	23	Qualification to Play-offs
15	Herlev (R)	30	5	6	19	27	67	−40	21	Relegation to Denmark Series
16	NB Bornholm (R)	30	1	3	26	14	73	−59	6	Relegation to Denmark Series

Updated to match(es) played on 23 June 2013. Source: Danish FA
Rules for classification: 1) points; 2) goal difference; 3) number of goals scored.
(O) Play-off winners; (P) Promoted; (R) Relegated

== West ==
Pos	Team	Pld	W	D	L	GF	GA	GD	Pts	Promotion or relegation
1	Marienlyst (P)	30	21	5	4	81	45	+36	68	Promotion to Danish 1st Division
2	Aarhus Fremad	30	18	7	5	63	17	+46	61	
3	Brabrand	30	15	8	7	51	40	+11	53	
4	Blokhus	30	14	8	8	56	44	+12	50	
5	FC Svendborg	30	14	6	10	54	45	+9	48	
6	Næsby BK	30	12	10	8	62	52	+10	46	
7	Middelfart G&BK	30	11	8	11	45	38	+7	41	
8	Thisted FC	30	11	8	11	51	49	+2	41	
9	FC Skanderborg	30	12	5	13	60	60	0	41	
10	Skovbakken IK	30	9	10	11	45	51	−6	37	
11	Søllerød-Vedbæk	30	10	6	14	49	58	−9	36	
12	FC Sydvest 05	30	9	6	15	44	59	−15	33	
13	Ringkøbing IF	30	8	7	15	47	61	−14	31	
14	Kjellerup (R)	30	8	6	16	39	60	−21	30	Qualification to Play-offs
15	Otterup B&I (R)	30	7	8	15	47	73	−26	29	Relegation to Denmark Series
16	Varde IF (R)	30	2	10	18	35	77	−42	16	Relegation to Denmark Series

Updated to match(es) played on 23 June 2013. Source: Danish FA
Rules for classification: 1) points; 2) goal difference; 3) number of goals scored.
(P) Promoted; (R) Relegated

== Play-off ==
=== Relegation game ===
Due to the bankruptcy of FC Fyn in the Danish 1st Division an extra spot in the 2013–14 Danish 2nd Divisions will be open. The Dansk Boldspil Union decided that the extra spot was to go to the winner of a play-off game between the two teams in 14th place. The two teams will play promotion game on home and away basis.

Team 1	Agg.	Team 2	1st leg	2nd leg
Fremad Amager	5–2	Kjellerup IF	3–1	2–1

First leg

26 June 2013
19:00 CEST

Fremad Amager	3–1	Kjellerup IF
Azaquoun 22'; Abdalas 53'; Møller 75'	Report	Rask 79'

Sundby Idrætspark, Copenhagen
Attendance: 1,958
Referee: Kenn Hansen

Second leg

29 June 2013
13:30 CEST

Kjellerup IF	1–2	Fremad Amager
Rask 8'	Report	Hansen 62', 86'

Bjergets Idrætsanlæg, Kjellerup
Attendance: 600
Referee: Jacob Kehlet
