= 2007–08 Danish Cup =

DBU Pokalen (The DBU Cup)

Tournament details
- Country: Denmark

Final positions
- Champions: Brøndby IF
- Runners-up: Esbjerg fB

The 2007–08 Danish Cup was the 54th season of the Danish Cup. The first round were played about 6 August 2007 and the final was played on 1 May 2008.

The winner qualified for the UEFA Cup.

== First round ==
In the first round 54 teams from the "series" (2007 Denmark Series and lower), 22 teams from 2006–07 Danish 2nd Divisions and 12 teams from 2006–07 Danish 1st Division (no. 5 to 16) competed.

Team 1	Score	Team 2
6 August 2007
Struer BK	4–1	Spjald IF
7 August 2007
BK Fix	1–3	Allerød FK
Herlev IF	1–0	B.93
Hjørring AIK Frem	1–0	Skagen IK
8 August 2007
Marstal/Rise	3–1	Slagelse B&I
Ishøj BK	0–7	Dragør BK
Rosenhøj BK	3–5	FC Lejre
Værebro BK	0–1	Søllerød-Vedbæk BK
Herstedøster IC	2–5	Fremad Amager
Vanløse IF	2–1	Skovlunde IF
Kastrup BK	2–3	Værløse BK
Roskilde KFUM	0–5	Greve Fodbold
Gentofte-Vangede IF	1–3	Brønshøj BK
FC Roskilde	2–0	AB 70
Stenløse BK	0–3	Hvidovre IF
BK Viktoria	1–4	Glostrup FK
Ledøje-Smørum Fodbold	0–1	BK Skjold
Sorø IF Freja	0–3	Lolland-Falster Alliancen
Raklev GI	1–0 (a.e.t.)	Maribo BK
BK Frem Sakskøbing	1–5	Næstved BK
Døllefjelde-Musse IF	1–4	Holbæk B&I
Sanderum BK	2–5	Svendborg fB
Tåsinge fB	2–0	Fjordager IF
Egebjerg Fodbold	0–1	Søhus BK
SUB Sønderborg	2–12	Kolding FC
Vojens B&I	2–5	FC Sydvest 05
Næsbjerg RUI	0–4	Varde IF
Bjerringbro IF	0–8	Brabrand IF
Funder GF	1–3	Aarhus Fremad
Odder IGF	2–0	Viby IF
BPI	5–0	Kolt/Hesselager IF
Skovbakken IK	4–1	Grenaa IF
Skjern GF	0–3	Holstebro BK
Overlund GF	0–7	Skive IK
FC Midtthy	0–6	Thisted FC
Lindholm IF	0–2	Jetsmark IF
Aalborg Chang	0–2	Hobro IK
Aalborg Freja	0–3	FC Hjørring
BK Frem	0–0 (a.e.t.) (1–4 p)	Ølstykke FC
AB	1–2	HIK
Herfølge BK	3–0	Køge BK
FC Fyn	1–0	Næsby BK
9 August 2007
AIK Frederiksholm	1–3	RIK/Knudsker
Humlebæk BK	0–4	Jægersborg BK

== Second round ==
In second round competed 44 winning teams from first round, 4 teams from 2006–07 Danish 1st Division (no. 1 to 4) and 8 teams from 2006–07 Danish Superliga (no. 5 to 12).

The draw were held on 10 August 2006.

Team 1	Score	Team 2
28 August 2007
BPI	0–6	Skive IK
Søhus BK	1–3	FC Hjørring
Raklev GI	0–3	BK Skjold
Holbæk B&I	6–2	HIK
29 August 2007
RIK/Knudsker	2–3	Værløse BK
Varde IF	1–0	Aarhus Fremad
FC Sydvest 05	0–10	AC Horsens
Hjørring AIK Frem	0–3	Kolding FC
Tåsinge fB	0–11	AGF
Odder IGF	0–2	SønderjyskE
Hobro IK	3–1	Holstebro BK
Skovbakken IK	2–6	Vejle BK
Brabrand IF	1–4	FC Fredericia
Struer BK	0–5	FC Fyn
Jetsmark IF	1–1 (a.e.t.) (5–4 p)	Viborg FF
Marstal/Rise	0–2	Thisted FC
Allerød FK	1–4	Brøndby IF
Jægersborg BK	0–1	Hvidovre IF
FC Lejre	1–6	FC Nordsjælland
Herlev IF	0–1	Randers FC
Fremad Amager	1–4	Herfølge BK
Dragør BK	0–5	Næstved BK
Brønshøj BK	2–5 (a.e.t.)	Lolland-Falster Alliancen
Greve Fodbold	1–0	FC Roskilde
Søllerød-Vedbæk BK	2–6	Ølstykke FC
Vanløse IF	0–2	Esbjerg fB
Glostrup FK	0–2	Lyngby BK
5 September 2007
Svendborg fB	0–2	Silkeborg IF

== Third round ==
In third round compete 28 winning teams from second round and 4 teams from 2006–07 Danish Superliga (no. 1 to 4).

Team 1	Score	Team 2
25 September 2007
Jetsmark IF	2–3 (a.e.t.)	Skive IK
26 September 2007
BK Skjold	1–4	Kolding FC
Værløse BK	1–4	Esbjerg fB
Thisted FC	0–2	AGF
Greve Fodbold	4–0	Hobro IK
Varde IF	7–3	Lolland-Falster Alliancen
Silkeborg IF	1–2	Brøndby IF
Vejle BK	2–1	FC Nordsjælland
Ølstykke FC	0–3	Randers FC
Næstved BK	3–2	AC Horsens
FC Hjørring	0–3	FC Midtjylland
Herfølge BK	4–2	Lyngby BK
FC Fredericia	1–3	F.C. Copenhagen
FC Fyn	0–2	AaB
Holbæk B&I	0–1	SønderjyskE
27 September 2007
Hvidovre IF	0–2	Odense BK

== Fourth round ==
Team 1	Score	Team 2
31 October 2007
Greve Fodbold	0–2	Skive IK
Varde IF	0–4	F.C. Copenhagen
AGF	0–1	FC Midtjylland
Næstved BK	5–2	Kolding FC
Vejle BK	0–0 (a.e.t.) (5–4 p)	AaB
SønderjyskE	0–2 (a.e.t.)	Randers FC
Odense BK	0–1 (a.e.t.)	Brøndby IF
1 November 2007
Herfølge BK	0–1 (a.e.t.)	Esbjerg fB

== Quarter-finals ==
Team 1	Score	Team 2
8 March 2008
Næstved BK	0–2	F.C. Copenhagen
9 March 2008
Skive IK	0–4	Esbjerg fB
Vejle BK	1–2	FC Midtjylland
Brøndby IF	2–1	Randers FC

== Semi-finals ==
The semi finals were played on a home and away basis. The legs were played on 9 and 16 April 2008.

Team 1	Agg.	Team 2	1st leg	2nd leg
Brøndby IF	5–0	FC Midtjylland	3–0	2–0
F.C. Copenhagen	2–3	Esbjerg fB	0–1	2–2

== Final ==
1 May 2008
15:00 CEST

Brøndby IF	3–2	Esbjerg fB
Holmén 15' von Schlebrügge 69'; Retov 85'		Rieks 62', 79'

Parken Stadium, Copenhagen
Attendance: 33,154
Referee: Claus Bo Larsen

== See also ==
- Football in Denmark
- 2007–08 in Danish football
- 2007–08 Danish Superliga
- 2007–08 Danish 1st Division
- 2007–08 Danish 2nd Divisions
