= 2011–12 Danish 1st Division =

67th season of Danish 1st Division

Danish 1st Division
- Season: 2011–12

The 2011–12 Danish 1st Division season is the 16th season of the Danish 1st Division league championship, governed by the Danish Football Association. It is set to start on 12 August 2011 with Viborg FF facing off against FC Hjørring. The final matches of the season are scheduled for 10 June 2012.

This will be the only season with a fourteen-club First Division. As only one team will be promoted from the Second Divisions, the league will be reduced to twelve teams from the next season, switching to the same system as the Superliga with three round-robin rounds and two relegation spots.

The division-champion and runners-up are promoted to the 2012–13 Danish Superliga. The teams in the 12th, 13th and 14th places are relegated to the 2012–13 Danish 2nd Divisions.

== Participants ==
Locations of the Danish 1st Division 2011–12 teams

Club	Finishing position last season	First season of current spell in 1st Division
AB	9th	2004–05
Blokhus FC	1st in 2nd Division West	2011–12
Brønshøj BK	5th	2010–11
Esbjerg fB	12th in Superliga	2011–12
FC Fredericia	6th	2001–02
FC Hjørring	13th	2010–11
FC Roskilde	8th	2008–09
FC Vestsjælland	7th	2009–10
Hobro IK	12th	2010–11
Næstved BK	10th	2006–07
Randers FC	11th in Superliga	2011–12
Skive IK	4th	2007–08
Vejle Kolding	3rd	2009–10
Viborg FF	11th	2008–09

== League table ==
Pos	Team	Pld	W	D	L	GF	GA	GD	Pts	Promotion or relegation
1	Esbjerg fB (C)	26	21	3	2	60	19	+41	66	Promotion to Danish Superliga
2	Randers FC (P)	26	15	4	7	38	22	+16	49	Promotion to Danish Superliga
3	Vejle Kolding	26	12	8	6	58	32	+26	44	
4	Viborg FF	26	10	10	6	45	34	+11	40	
5	Brønshøj	26	10	10	6	35	34	+1	40	
6	Vestsjælland	26	10	8	8	42	35	+7	38	
7	Fredericia	26	9	8	9	33	30	+3	35	
8	Skive IK	26	9	7	10	31	41	−10	34	
9	Hobro	26	8	9	9	37	35	+2	33	
10	Hjørring	26	8	7	11	31	42	−11	31	
11	AB	26	7	8	11	32	44	−12	29	
12	FC Roskilde (R)	26	8	3	15	28	38	−10	27	Relegation to Danish 2nd Divisions
13	Næstved BK (R)	26	6	4	16	32	51	−19	22	Relegation to Danish 2nd Divisions
14	Blokhus (R)	26	2	5	19	27	72	−45	11	Relegation to Danish 2nd Divisions

Source: Danish Football Association
Rules for classification: 1) points; 2) goal difference; 3) number of goals scored.
(C) Champions; (P) Promoted; (R) Relegated

== Managerial changes ==
Team	Outgoing manager	Manner of departure	Date of vacancy	Replaced by	Date of appointment	Position in table
Vejle Kolding	(Denmark) Viggo Jensen	End of contract	30 May 2011	(Denmark) Nicolai Wael	1 July 2011	Pre-Season
Randers FC	(Denmark) Peter Elstrup	End of tenure as caretaker	21 June 2011	(Denmark) Michael Hemmingsen	22 June 2011	Pre-Season
Viborg FF	(Denmark) Steffen Højer & (Denmark) Søren Frederiksen	Resigned	16 June 2011	(Denmark) Ove Christensen	29 June 2011	Pre-Season
FC Hjørring	(Denmark) Ove Christensen	Signed by Viborg FF	29 June 2011	(Denmark) Boye Habekost	15 July 2011	Pre-Season
FC Vestsjælland	(Denmark) Michael Schjønberg	Sacked	29 June 2011	(Denmark) Ove Pedersen	30 June 2011	Pre-Season
Næstved BK	(Denmark) Brian Flies	Resigned	30 September 2011	(Denmark) Klavs Rasmussen	6 October 2011	14th
FC Hjørring	(Denmark) Boye Habekost	Sacked	22 March 2012	(Denmark) Henrik Lehm	22 March 2012	9th
FC Roskilde	(Denmark) Carsten Broe	Sacked	21 May 2012	(Denmark) Anders Theil (caretaker)	21 May 2012	12th

== See also ==
- 2011–12 in Danish football
