= 2010–11 Danish 2nd Divisions =

Danish 2nd Divisions
- Season: 2010–11

The 2010–11 Danish 2nd Divisions, beginning on 7 August 2010 and ending on 11 June 2011, will be the divided in two groups of sixteen teams. The two group winners will face each other for a single promotion spot in a two-legged play-off, rather than the normal three promotion spots, as decided in March 2010. This is done to reduce the First Division from 16 to 14 and eventually 12 teams. The bottom team from each group will be relegated, along with the loser of a two-legged play-off tie between the two clubs taking the penultimate spot at the end of the season.

Because of an uneven distribution of West and East-teams (divided by the Great Belt), two East-teams, Boldklubben 1908 and Rishøj Boldklub, were drawn into the West-division (originally three with Greve as the third, but the bankruptcy of BK Frem mentioned below reduced the number to two).

Shortly before the season, Boldklubben Frem, who were one of the three relegated teams from the First Division, went bankrupt and were relegated to the Copenhagen Series. This meant that otherwise relegated Otterup were awarded Frem's place in the tournament.

== Participants ==
Locations of the 2010–11 Danish 2nd Division teams (East-teams in red, west-teams in blue). Copenhagen teams: Avarta, B.93, B 1908 (West), BGA, BSF, Frem, Herlev, HIK, Skjold and Vanløse

Club	Group	Finishing position last season	First season of current spell in 2nd Divisions
Aarhus Fremad	West	3rd	2008–09
Allerød	East	15th	2009–10
Avarta	East	4th	2008–09
B.93	East	2nd	2005–06
B 1908	West	14th (East)	2009–10
BGA	East	13th	1999–2000
Blokhus FC	West	5th	2002–03
Brabrand	West	16th in 1st Division	2010–11
BSF	East	4th in Denmark Series Group 1 (as Skovlunde IF)	2010–11
Elite 3000, Elsinore	East	1st in Denmark Series Group 1	2010–11
FC Djursland	West	8th in Denmark Series Group 3	2010–11
FC Svendborg	West	7th	2008–09
Frederikssund	East	2nd in Denmark Series Group 1	2010–11
Greve	East	10th	2006–07
Herlev	East	2nd in Denmark Series Group 2	2010–11
HIK	East	7th	2008–09
Holstebro	West	10th	2009–10
Lindholm	West	7th in Denmark Series Group 3	2010–11
Lolland-Falster Alliancen	East	11th	2009–10
Middelfart	West	1st in Denmark Series Group 2	2010–11
Nordvest FC	East	6th	2009–10
Næsby	West	15th	2004–05
Otterup B&I	West	16th	2009–10
Rishøj	West	3rd in Denmark Series Group 2	2010–11
Skjold	East	16th	2006–07
Skovbakken	West	2nd in Denmark Series Group 3	2010–11
Stenløse	East	12th	2005–06
Søllerød-Vedbæk	East	3rd	2005–06
Thisted	West	14th in 1st Division	2010–11
Tjørring	West	13th	2009–10
Vanløse	East	14th	2007–08
Varde	West	11th	2005–06

== East ==
=== League table ===
Pos	Team	Pld	W	D	L	GF	GA	GD	Pts	Promotion or relegation
1	Nordvest FC	30	19	8	3	59	29	+30	65	Qualification to Promotion game
2	Elite 3000	30	17	6	7	63	41	+22	57	
3	HIK	30	14	12	4	43	24	+19	54	
4	LFA	30	14	11	5	56	25	+31	53	
5	Søllerød-Vedbæk	30	13	11	6	58	47	+11	50	
6	B.93	30	12	9	9	57	44	+13	45	
7	Avarta	30	11	9	10	51	44	+7	42	
8	Vanløse IF	30	11	9	10	58	52	+6	42	
9	Herlev	30	11	8	11	44	51	−7	41	
10	Stenløse BK	30	10	7	13	38	44	−6	37	
11	BGA	30	9	8	13	40	45	−5	35	
12	Skjold	30	7	12	11	36	43	−7	33	
13	Frederikssund (R)	30	8	8	14	43	66	−23	32	Relegation to Denmark Series
14	Allerød FK (R)	30	5	7	18	32	61	−29	22	Relegation to Denmark Series
15	Greve (R)	30	4	9	17	32	65	−33	21	Relegation to Denmark Series
16	BSF (R)	30	4	8	18	30	59	−29	20	Relegation to Denmark Series

Updated to match(es) played on 11 June 2011. Source: Danish FA
Rules for classification: 1) points; 2) goal difference; 3) number of goals scored.
(R) Relegated

== West ==
=== League table ===
Pos	Team	Pld	W	D	L	GF	GA	GD	Pts	Promotion or relegation
1	Blokhus (P)	30	21	7	2	78	33	+45	70	Qualification to Promotion game
2	Aarhus Fremad	30	19	6	5	68	36	+32	63	
3	Thisted FC	30	17	6	7	69	39	+30	57	
4	Næsby BK	30	12	12	6	51	38	+13	48	
5	Skovbakken IK	30	13	9	8	50	41	+9	48	
6	Brabrand	30	12	10	8	40	26	+14	46	
7	FC Svendborg	30	11	6	13	53	50	+3	39	
8	B 1908	30	10	6	14	40	42	−2	36	
9	Lindholm IF	30	10	5	15	50	63	−13	35	
10	Rishøj BK	30	8	10	12	41	55	−14	34	
11	Otterup B&I	30	10	4	16	49	73	−24	34	
12	Varde IF	30	9	6	15	42	56	−14	33	
13	Middelfart G&BK (Note: Middelfart G&BK was awarded three 0-3-defeats against Blokhus FC, B 1908 and Rishøj BK due to fielding an ineligible player.) (R)	30	9	6	15	46	72	−26	33	Relegation to Denmark Series
14	Djursland (R)	30	9	5	16	47	53	−6	32	Relegation to Denmark Series
15	Holstebro (R)	30	8	7	15	42	56	−14	31	Relegation to Denmark Series
16	Tjørring IF (R)	30	8	3	19	35	68	−33	27	Relegation to Denmark Series

Updated to match(es) played on 11 June 2011. Source: Danish FA
Rules for classification: 1) points; 2) goal difference; 3) number of goals scored.
(P) Promoted; (R) Relegated

== Play-offs ==
=== Promotion game ===
The two winners will play promotion game on home and away basis.

Team 1	Agg.	Team 2	1st leg	2nd leg
Nordvest FC	2–2 (a.g.)	Blokhus FC	2–2	0–0
