= 2008–09 Danish 2nd Divisions =

Danish 2nd Divisions
- Season: 2008–09

The 2008-09 season in Danish 2nd Division was divided in two groups. The two winners were promoted to the 2009–10 Danish 1st Division, together with the winner of a promotion game between the two runners-up. Second squad teams are ineligible for promotion.

== Participants ==
Locations of the Danish 2nd Division 2008–09 teams (East-teams in red, west-teams in blue). Copenhagen clubs: B.93, BK Avarta, BK Skjold, BIF 2, Brønshøj BK, FCK 2, Glostrup FK, HIK, Skovlunde IF and Vanløse IF. Aarhus clubs: AGF 2, Aarhus Fremad, Brabrand IF and Skovbakken IK. Odense clubs: FC Fyn, Næsby BK and OB 2.

| Club | Group | Finishing position last season | First season of current spell in 2nd Divisions |
|---|---|---|---|
| AaB 2 | West | 6th | 2007–08 |
| Aarhus Fremad | West | 15th in 1st Division | 2008–09 |
| AGF 2 | West | 5th | 2007–08 |
| B.93 | East | 9th | 2005–06 |
| BK Avarta | East | 1st in Denmark Series Pool 1 | 2008–09 |
| BK Skjold | East | 8th | 2006–07 |
| Blokhus FC | West | 10th | 2002–03 |
| Brabrand IF | West | 2nd | 2007–08 |
| Brøndby 2 | East | 4th | 2005–06 |
| Brønshøj BK | East | 3rd | 2006–07 |
| BSV | East | 13th | 2005–06 |
| Esbjerg 2 | West | 7th | 2005–06 |
| F.C. Copenhagen 2 | East | 6th | 2005–06 |
| FC Fyn | West | 3rd | 2004–05 |
| FC Hjørring | West | 13th | 1999–00 |
| FC Svendborg | West | 2nd in Denmark Series Pool 1 | 2008–09 |
| FC Vestsjælland | East | 5th | 2002–03 |
| Glostrup FK | East | 11th | 1999–00 |
| Greve Fodbold | East | 10th | 2006–07 |
| HIK | East | 14th in 1st Division | 2008–09 |
| Hobro IK | West | 9th | 2006–07 |
| Ikast FS (FCM 2) | West | 8th | 2006–07 |
| Næsby BK | West | 14th | 2004–05 |
| OB 2 | West | 4th | 2007–08 |
| Randers Freja (RFC 2) | West | 1st in Denmark Series Pool 2 | 2008–09 |
| Skovbakken IK | West | 5th in Denmark Series Pool 2 | 2008–09 |
| Skovlunde IF | East | 7th | 2006–07 |
| Stenløse BK | East | 12th | 2005–06 |
| Vanløse IF | East | 12th | 2007–08 |
| Varde IF | West | 11th | 2005–06 |
| Værløse BK | East | 14th | 2007–08 |
| Ølstykke FC | East | 16th in 1st Division | 2008–09 |

== East ==
=== League table ===
| Pos | Team | Pld | W | D | L | GF | GA | GD | Pts | Promotion or relegation |
|---|---|---|---|---|---|---|---|---|---|---|
| 1 | Vestsjælland (P) | 30 | 19 | 8 | 3 | 80 | 31 | +49 | 65 | Promotion to Danish 1st Division |
| 2 | B.93 (Q) | 30 | 17 | 11 | 2 | 67 | 32 | +35 | 62 | Qualification to Promotion game |
| 3 | Brønshøj | 30 | 16 | 8 | 6 | 62 | 37 | +25 | 56 | |
| 4 | Brøndby 2 | 30 | 16 | 4 | 10 | 63 | 48 | +15 | 52 | |
| 5 | HIK | 30 | 14 | 6 | 10 | 45 | 40 | +5 | 48 | |
| 6 | Stenløse BK | 30 | 12 | 7 | 11 | 55 | 51 | +4 | 43 | |
| 7 | Copenhagen 2 | 30 | 11 | 7 | 12 | 43 | 42 | +1 | 40 | |
| 8 | Avarta | 30 | 10 | 8 | 12 | 47 | 49 | −2 | 38 | |
| 9 | Skjold | 30 | 10 | 7 | 13 | 47 | 50 | −3 | 37 | |
| 10 | Ølstykke FC | 30 | 10 | 7 | 13 | 50 | 62 | −12 | 37 | |
| 11 | Glostrup FK | 30 | 9 | 10 | 11 | 37 | 52 | −15 | 37 | |
| 12 | Greve | 30 | 9 | 8 | 13 | 39 | 55 | −16 | 35 | |
| 13 | Søllerød-Vedbæk | 30 | 9 | 7 | 14 | 43 | 62 | −19 | 34 | |
| 14 | Vanløse IF | 30 | 7 | 8 | 15 | 45 | 49 | −4 | 29 | |
| 15 | Skovlunde IF (Q) | 30 | 6 | 8 | 16 | 40 | 63 | −23 | 26 | Qualification to Relegation game |
| 16 | Værløse BK (R) | 30 | 5 | 6 | 19 | 39 | 79 | −40 | 21 | Relegation to Denmark Series |

Source: Danish FA
Rules for classification: 1) points; 2) goal difference; 3) number of goals scored.
(P) Promoted; (Q) Qualified for the phase indicated; (R) Relegated

=== Results ===
| Home \ Away | B93 | BKA | BKS | BIF | BBK | BSV | FCK | FCV | GFK | GRE | HIK | SIF | SBK | VIF | VBK | ØFC |
|---|---|---|---|---|---|---|---|---|---|---|---|---|---|---|---|---|
| B.93 | | 5–1 | 2–1 | 5–2 | 2–2 | 1–1 | 3–1 | 2–2 | 2–0 | 5–0 | 3–1 | 3–2 | 1–1 | 0–0 | 1–1 | 2–3 |
| Avarta | 0–2 | | 1–4 | 0–2 | 0–1 | 2–0 | 1–0 | 1–1 | 1–2 | 1–1 | 0–2 | 4–2 | 3–5 | 3–1 | 5–1 | 2–1 |
| Skjold | 0–3 | 2–1 | | 0–1 | 1–3 | 2–0 | 3–1 | 1–3 | 2–2 | 0–2 | 1–2 | 4–1 | 4–1 | 1–0 | 2–2 | 3–4 |
| Brøndby 2 | 1–1 | 3–1 | 1–2 | | 1–1 | 3–1 | 0–2 | 5–1 | 3–0 | 2–1 | 2–3 | 2–0 | 1–7 | 2–0 | 4–1 | 3–1 |
| Brønshøj | 1–2 | 1–1 | 2–1 | 2–0 | | 2–2 | 2–3 | 0–0 | 2–1 | 1–2 | 2–2 | 3–2 | 2–1 | 1–2 | 3–1 | 2–0 |
| Søllerød-Vedbæk | 2–3 | 1–1 | 2–2 | 2–0 | 1–4 | | 1–0 | 1–1 | 2–3 | 0–6 | 0–4 | 3–1 | 4–3 | 3–1 | 2–4 | 3–2 |
| Copenhagen 2 | 2–2 | 0–2 | 3–0 | 2–0 | 2–2 | 3–0 | | 1–3 | 1–1 | 3–0 | 0–0 | 1–0 | 2–2 | 2–1 | 2–1 | 1–5 |
| Vestsjælland | 2–1 | 4–1 | 1–1 | 8–0 | 3–0 | 2–0 | 2–1 | | 0–1 | 3–0 | 3–3 | 5–1 | 1–2 | 4–2 | 5–0 | 1–1 |
| Glostrup FK | 1–1 | 1–1 | 3–0 | 1–7 | 1–5 | 0–2 | 2–2 | 0–3 | | 0–0 | 3–2 | 3–0 | 0–2 | 2–1 | 1–1 | 0–2 |
| Greve Fodbold | 0–2 | 0–6 | 2–4 | 1–4 | 1–1 | 1–4 | 1–0 | 0–2 | 0–0 | | 1–1 | 4–2 | 1–2 | 1–1 | 1–0 | 3–3 |
| Hellerup IK | 0–1 | 0–2 | 1–0 | 1–4 | 0–2 | 2–0 | 2–1 | 2–4 | 0–0 | 1–0 | | 3–2 | 0–2 | 2–2 | 3–1 | 1–0 |
| Skovlunde IF | 1–3 | 1–1 | 2–0 | 1–1 | 0–5 | 1–1 | 1–0 | 0–3 | 1–2 | 1–1 | 2–0 | | 1–4 | 1–0 | 5–1 | 3–0 |
| Stenløse BK | 1–2 | 1–1 | 1–1 | 0–0 | 2–3 | 2–0 | 1–2 | 1–4 | 2–0 | 2–0 | 0–2 | 3–2 | | 1–1 | 0–0 | 1–3 |
| Vanløse IF | 1–3 | 0–1 | 2–2 | 0–1 | 0–1 | 5–2 | 2–2 | 1–1 | 1–2 | 1–3 | 1–0 | 1–1 | 7–3 | | 1–0 | 6–0 |
| Værløse BK | 1–4 | 3–1 | 0–2 | 0–6 | 1–5 | 1–1 | 2–1 | 1–5 | 3–2 | 3–4 | 0–2 | 2–2 | 1–2 | 1–2 | | 2–4 |
| Ølstykke FC | 1–1 | 2–2 | 1–1 | 3–2 | 2–1 | 0–2 | 0–2 | 1–3 | 3–3 | 0–2 | 1–3 | 1–1 | 2–0 | 3–2 | 1–4 | |

Source: Danish FA
Legend: Blue = home team win; Yellow = draw; Red = away team win.

=== Top goalscorers ===
Last updated: 9 June 2009; Source: Danish Football Association

| Pos | Player | Scored for | Goals |
|---|---|---|---|
| 1 | (Denmark) Thomas Wagner | Stenløse BK | 23 |
| 2 | (Denmark) Rasmus Festersen | FC Vestsjælland | 20 |
| 3 | (Denmark) Patrick Mortensen | Brøndby 2 | 19 |
| 4 | (Denmark) Danni König | Brønshøj BK | 16 |
| 5 | (Denmark) Andreas Mortensen | FC Vestsjælland | 14 |
| 6 | (Denmark) Jesper Fosgaard | BK Avarta | 13 |
| 6 | (Denmark) Kevin Bechmann Timm | F.C. Copenhagen 2 | 13 |
| 8 | (Denmark) Christian Lundby | Greve Fodbold | 12 |
| 8 | (Denmark) Morten Seifert | BK Avarta | 12 |
| 10 | (Denmark) Geert Baunsgaard | B.93 | 11 |
| 10 | (Denmark) Christian Brøndum | Stenløse BK | 11 |
| 10 | (Denmark) Thomas Christiansen | F.C. Copenhagen 2 | 11 |
| 10 | (Denmark) Kristian Krog | Vanløse IF | 11 |
| 10 | (Denmark) Emil Sørensen | Ølstykke FC | 11 |
| 10 | (Denmark) Mads Torry | Glostrup FK | 11 |
| 10 | (Denmark) Thomas Myssing | BK Søllerød-Vedbæk | 11 |

== West ==
=== League table ===
| Pos | Team | Pld | W | D | L | GF | GA | GD | Pts | Promotion or relegation |
|---|---|---|---|---|---|---|---|---|---|---|
| 1 | Fyn (P) | 30 | 19 | 7 | 4 | 75 | 32 | +43 | 64 | Promotion to Danish 1st Division |
| 2 | OB 2 | 30 | 18 | 3 | 9 | 61 | 45 | +16 | 57 | |
| 3 | Brabrand (Q) | 30 | 15 | 6 | 9 | 50 | 32 | +18 | 51 | Qualification to Promotion game |
| 4 | Blokhus | 30 | 16 | 3 | 11 | 63 | 48 | +15 | 51 | |
| 5 | Esbjerg 2 | 30 | 15 | 6 | 9 | 53 | 46 | +7 | 51 | |
| 6 | Randers Freja (RFC 2) | 30 | 15 | 4 | 11 | 54 | 39 | +15 | 49 | |
| 7 | Hobro | 30 | 13 | 9 | 8 | 54 | 48 | +6 | 48 | |
| 8 | Aarhus Fremad | 30 | 13 | 6 | 11 | 47 | 47 | 0 | 45 | |
| 9 | FC Svendborg | 30 | 14 | 2 | 14 | 53 | 51 | +2 | 44 | |
| 10 | Varde IF | 30 | 13 | 4 | 13 | 49 | 58 | −9 | 43 | |
| 11 | AaB 2 | 30 | 11 | 4 | 15 | 47 | 50 | −3 | 37 | |
| 12 | Ikast FS (FCM 2) | 30 | 8 | 8 | 14 | 44 | 63 | −19 | 32 | |
| 13 | Hjørring | 30 | 7 | 9 | 14 | 35 | 48 | −13 | 30 | |
| 14 | AGF 2 | 30 | 6 | 8 | 16 | 42 | 61 | −19 | 26 | |
| 15 | Næsby BK (Q) | 30 | 6 | 8 | 16 | 31 | 52 | −21 | 26 | Qualification to Relegation game |
| 16 | Skovbakken IK (R) | 30 | 6 | 3 | 21 | 35 | 73 | −38 | 21 | Relegation to Denmark Series |

Source: Danish FA
Rules for classification: 1) points; 2) goal difference; 3) number of goals scored.
(P) Promoted; (Q) Qualified for the phase indicated; (R) Relegated

=== Results ===
| Home \ Away | AaB | AaFr | AGF | BFC | BIF | EfB | FCF | FCH | FCS | HIK | IFS | NB | OB | RFr | SIK | VIF |
|---|---|---|---|---|---|---|---|---|---|---|---|---|---|---|---|---|
| AaB 2 | | 4–2 | 4–3 | 0–5 | 2–0 | 2–4 | 0–1 | 2–3 | 1–2 | 0–2 | 2–0 | 3–0 | 3–1 | 3–1 | 2–0 | 0–1 |
| Aarhus Fremad | 1–0 | | 2–2 | 1–1 | 2–2 | 0–2 | 1–3 | 3–0 | 2–1 | 3–3 | 4–0 | 2–1 | 1–2 | 1–2 | 1–2 | 0–0 |
| AGF 2 | 1–1 | 1–3 | | 0–4 | 1–0 | 1–1 | 1–1 | 2–0 | 0–5 | 1–1 | 7–1 | 3–0 | 2–2 | 1–1 | 2–3 | 1–3 |
| Blokhus | 2–1 | 1–2 | 3–1 | | 2–4 | 3–2 | 3–1 | 3–2 | 4–2 | 0–1 | 4–2 | 1–0 | 4–1 | 0–1 | 4–1 | 1–1 |
| Brabrand | 3–1 | 0–2 | 2–0 | 5–1 | | 2–1 | 1–0 | 2–0 | 1–3 | 1–4 | 1–1 | 0–0 | 3–0 | 0–0 | 4–1 | 3–0 |
| Esbjerg 2 | 3–1 | 1–0 | 1–0 | 2–1 | 1–3 | | 3–2 | 0–0 | 0–1 | 2–1 | 3–1 | 3–3 | 2–3 | 1–1 | 4–1 | 4–3 |
| Fyn | 3–1 | 7–0 | 5–1 | 4–1 | 2–2 | 3–0 | | 1–1 | 1–1 | 2–0 | 3–0 | 0–0 | 3–2 | 2–0 | 3–1 | 5–1 |
| Hjørring | 1–1 | 0–1 | 2–0 | 0–3 | 1–1 | 1–2 | 1–2 | | 2–1 | 0–0 | 2–2 | 2–2 | 3–2 | 3–1 | 1–1 | 3–1 |
| FC Svendborg | 2–0 | 2–4 | 4–2 | 1–3 | 2–1 | 0–2 | 0–3 | 1–0 | | 1–2 | 4–2 | 3–0 | 2–0 | 1–3 | 3–0 | 2–1 |
| Hobro | 1–3 | 2–3 | 2–1 | 1–1 | 1–0 | 2–2 | 1–1 | 2–2 | 3–0 | | 2–2 | 2–3 | 2–1 | 3–1 | 1–0 | 2–1 |
| Ikast FS (FCM 2) | 1–0 | 1–1 | 2–2 | 1–2 | 0–2 | 2–3 | 2–4 | 1–0 | 1–1 | 5–2 | | 2–1 | 0–0 | 1–0 | 3–1 | 2–0 |
| Næsby BK | 0–3 | 2–1 | 1–2 | 3–1 | 0–1 | 0–0 | 1–1 | 3–0 | 3–0 | 0–3 | 2–2 | | 1–2 | 0–2 | 0–1 | 0–3 |
| OB 2 | 1–1 | 2–0 | 2–0 | 3–0 | 3–1 | 2–1 | 1–3 | 1–0 | 0–3 | 4–1 | 2–1 | 1–0 | | 4–2 | 4–1 | 5–0 |
| Randers Freja (RFC 2) | 2–0 | 1–2 | 3–2 | 3–2 | 1–0 | 4–1 | 2–4 | 3–0 | 2–0 | 2–3 | 3–2 | 4–0 | 1–2 | | 0–1 | 5–0 |
| Skovbakken IK | 3–3 | 0–1 | 1–2 | 0–2 | 0–1 | 0–2 | 1–4 | 3–1 | 4–3 | 2–2 | 1–4 | 2–3 | 2–5 | 0–3 | | 2–3 |
| Varde IF | 1–3 | 2–1 | 1–0 | 2–1 | 0–4 | 3–0 | 3–1 | 1–4 | 4–2 | 4–2 | 4–0 | 2–2 | 2–3 | 0–0 | 2–0 | |

Source: Danish FA
Legend: Blue = home team win; Yellow = draw; Red = away team win.

=== Top goalscorers ===
Last updated: 9 June 2009; Source: Danish Football Association

| Pos | Player | Scored for | Goals |
|---|---|---|---|
| 1 | (Denmark) Jesper Rasmussen | FC Svendborg | 20 |
| 2 | (Denmark) Jacob Bymar | Varde IF | 19 |
| 3 | (Denmark) Nikolaj Thomsen | Blokhus FC | 17 |
| 4 | (Denmark) Mads Overgaard | FC Fyn | 16 |
| 5 | (Denmark) Peter Tranberg | Blokhus FC | 14 |
| 5 | (Denmark) Martin Laustsen | Brabrand IF | 14 |
| 7 | (Denmark) Brian Johansen | Aarhus Fremad | 12 |
| 7 | (Denmark) Ronnie Schwartz | AaB 2 | 12 |
| 7 | (Denmark) Mark Tubæk | OB 2 | 12 |
| 10 | (Denmark) Christian Andreasen | Randers Freja | 11 |
| 10 | (Zimbabwe) Quincy Antipas | Blokhus FC | 11 |
| 10 | (Denmark) Martin Koordt | Næsby BK | 11 |
| 10 | (Denmark) Lennart Kruse | Varde IF | 11 |
| 10 | (South Africa) Lwasi Saluha | FC Fyn | 11 |
| 10 | (Denmark) Pelle Weber | OB 2 | 11 |

== Play-offs ==
=== Promotion game ===
The two runners-up will play promotion game on home and away basis.

| Team 1 | Agg. | Team 2 | 1st leg | 2nd leg |
|---|---|---|---|---|
| B.93 | 2–3 | Brabrand IF | 0–0 | 2–3 |

==== First leg ====
2009-06-17
19:00

| B.93 | 0 – 0 | Brabrand IF |

Østerbro Stadion, Copenhagen
Referee: Lars Skibild Jensen

==== Second leg ====
2009-06-20
15:00

| Brabrand IF | 3 – 2 | B.93 |
|---|---|---|
| Laustsen 50', 59'; Jungbloot 60' | | Kadrii 30', 39' |

Brabrand Stadion, Århus
Referee: Michael Tykgaard

=== Relegation game ===
The two teams placed 15th in each group will play relegation game on home and away basis.

| Team 1 | Agg. | Team 2 | 1st leg | 2nd leg |
|---|---|---|---|---|
| Næsby BK | 5–2 | Skovlunde IF | 2–1 | 3–1 |

==== First leg ====
2009-06-17
19:00

| Næsby BK | 2 – 1 | Skovlunde IF |
|---|---|---|
| Toft 26'; Jørgensen 64' | | Nielsen 71' |

Næsby Stadion, Odense
Referee: Kent Bøgelund

==== Second leg ====
2009-06-20
15:00

| Skovlunde IF | 1 – 3 | Næsby BK |
|---|---|---|
| Olsen 39' | | Christiansen 11'; Staal 60'; Madsen 74' |

Ballerup Idrætspark, Ballerup
Referee: Martin Olsgaard
