= 2009–10 Danish 2nd Divisions =

Danish 2nd Division
- Season: 2009–10
- Champions: East: Brønshøj BK; West: FC Hjørring
- Promoted: Brønshøj BK; FC Hjørring; Hobro IK
- Relegated: None (originally Otterup B&IK, but annulled)
- Top goalscorer: West: Danilo Arrieta (28); East: Niels Peter Kjølbye (20)

The 2009-10 season in Danish 2nd Division was divided in two groups. The two winners, Brønshøj BK and FC Hjørring were promoted to the 2010–11 Danish 1st Division, along with the runner-up from the West-division Hobro IK, after they beat their Eastern counterpart B.93 5–1 on aggregate in a two-legged promotion play-off. Relegation was decided when Otterup B&I from the West division lost 4–5 to BK Skjold in another two-legged match-up between the bottom teams from the divisions. This relegation was later annulled, as 1st Division relegatee BK Frem went bankrupt, forcing a further two-level-relegation to the Copenhagen Series and leaving an extra place open for Otterup.

On 6 March 2010 it was decided that the eight Superliga clubs' second teams should be withdrawn from the Second Division at the end of the season and be transferred to a separate reserves competition. Therefore, the relegation to the Denmark Series was reduced from six teams to one, and the promotion the other way increased from six to nine. A two-legged relegation play-off between the two 16th ranked teams would decide the relegation.

== Participants ==
Locations of the Danish 2nd Division 2008–09 teams (East-teams in red, west-teams in blue). Copenhagen clubs: B.93, B 1908, BGA, BK Avarta, BK Skjold, BIF 2, Brønshøj BK, FCK 2, HIK and Vanløse IF.

Club	Group	Finishing position last season	First season of current spell in 2nd Divisions
AaB 2	West	11th	2007–08
Aarhus Fremad	West	8th	2008–09
AGF 2	West	14th	2007–08
Allerød FK	East	2nd in Denmark Series Pool 1	2009–10
B.93	East	2nd	2005–06
B 1908	East	3rd in Denmark Series Pool 1	2009–10
BGA	East	11th	1999–00
BK Avarta	East	8th	2008–09
BK Skjold	East	9th	2006–07
Blokhus FC	West	4th	2002–03
Brøndby 2	East	4th	2005–06
Brønshøj BK	East	3rd	2006–07
BSV	East	13th	2005–06
Esbjerg 2	West	5th	2005–06
F.C. Copenhagen 2	East	7th	2005–06
FC Hjørring	West	13th	1999–00
FC Svendborg	West	9th	2008–09
Greve Fodbold	East	12th	2006–07
HIK	East	5th	2008–09
Hobro IK	West	7th	2006–07
Holstebro BK	West	2nd in Denmark Series Pool 3	2009–10
Ikast FS (FCM 2)	West	12th	2006–07
LFA	East	16th in 1st Division	2009–10
Nordvest FC	East	2nd in Denmark Series Pool 2	2009–10
Næsby BK	West	15th	2004–05
OB 2	West	2nd	2007–08
Otterup B&I	West	1st in Denmark Series Pool 2	2009–10
Randers Freja (RFC 2)	West	6th	2008–09
Stenløse BK	East	6th	2005–06
Tjørring IF	West	6th in Denmark Series Pool 3	2009–10
Vanløse IF	East	14th	2007–08
Varde IF	West	10th	2005–06

== East ==
=== League table ===
Pos	Team	Pld	W	D	L	GF	GA	GD	Pts	Promotion or relegation
1	Brønshøj (C, P)	30	18	7	5	47	27	+20	61	Promotion to Danish 1st Division
2	B.93	30	19	3	8	60	33	+27	60	Qualification to Promotion game
3	Søllerød-Vedbæk	30	17	8	5	70	36	+34	59	
4	Avarta	30	16	5	9	49	33	+16	53	
5	Brøndby 2	30	16	3	11	62	39	+23	51	Second teams no longer allowed in 2nd division
6	Nordvest FC	30	13	7	10	49	49	0	46	
7	HIK	30	12	7	11	50	48	+2	43	
8	Vanløse IF	30	11	10	9	32	31	+1	43	
9	Copenhagen 2	30	11	10	9	42	45	−3	43	Second teams no longer allowed in 2nd division
10	Greve	30	11	6	13	41	55	−14	39	
11	LFA	30	9	8	13	24	33	−9	35	
12	Stenløse BK	30	9	6	15	50	54	−4	33	
13	BGA	30	9	6	15	37	49	−12	33	
14	B 1908	30	8	5	17	35	54	−19	29	
15	Allerød FK	30	5	5	20	23	53	−30	20	
16	Skjold	30	4	8	18	22	54	−32	20	Qualification to Relegation game

Source: Danish FA
Rules for classification: 1) points; 2) goal difference; 3) number of goals scored.
(C) Champions; (P) Promoted

== West ==
=== League table ===
Pos	Team	Pld	W	D	L	GF	GA	GD	Pts	Promotion or relegation
1	Hjørring (C, P)	30	23	4	3	60	23	+37	73	Promotion to Danish 1st Division
2	Hobro (O, P)	30	18	6	6	74	42	+32	60	Qualification to Promotion game
4	Randers Freja (RFC 2)	30	16	7	7	53	34	+19	55	Second teams no longer allowed in 2nd division
5	Blokhus	30	15	7	8	49	23	+26	52	
6	OB 2	30	14	4	12	56	44	+12	46	Second teams no longer allowed in 2nd division
7	FC Svendborg	30	13	7	10	46	42	+4	46	
8	Esbjerg 2	30	12	8	10	57	44	+13	44	Second teams no longer allowed in 2nd division
9	Ikast FS (FCM 2)	30	13	4	13	62	60	+2	43	Second teams no longer allowed in 2nd division
10	Holstebro	30	13	2	15	48	62	−14	41	
11	Varde IF	30	9	4	17	46	56	−10	31	
12	AGF 2	30	8	6	16	36	68	−32	30	Second teams no longer allowed in 2nd division
13	Tjørring IF	30	6	7	17	35	66	−31	25	
13	AaB 2	30	6	7	17	32	64	−32	25	Second teams no longer allowed in 2nd division
15	Næsby BK	30	6	6	18	44	59	−15	24	
16	Otterup B&I (R)	30	4	7	19	38	70	−32	19	Qualification to Relegation game

Source: Danish FA
Rules for classification: 1) points; 2) goal difference; 3) number of goals scored.
(C) Champions; (O) Play-off winners; (P) Promoted; (R) Relegated

== Promotion game ==
=== First leg ===
16 June 2010
19:00 CEST (UTC+2)

B.93	0 – 2	Hobro IK
	(in Danish) Report	Kasper Fisker Jensen 9'; Mark Vestergaard 44'

Østerbro Stadion, Copenhagen
Referee: Dennis Mogensen

=== Second leg ===
19 June 2010
15:00 CEST (UTC+2)

Hobro IK	3 – 1	B.93
Anders Syberg 13'; Eno Hald Møller 20', 60'	(in Danish) Report	Mads Ibenfeldt 73'

Hobro Stadion, Hobro
Referee: Mads-Kristoffer Kristoffersen

Hobro IK win 5 – 1 on aggregate and are promoted to the 2010–11 Danish 1st Division

== Relegation game ==
The relegation of Otterup B&I for losing this playoff was later cancelled, as BK Frem went bankrupt and left another place open in the 2nd Division.

=== First leg ===
16 June 2010
19:00 CEST (UTC+2)

Otterup B&I	1 – 1	BK Skjold
Steffen Juhl 80'	(in Danish) Report	Sigurd Jeppson 59'

Otterup Stadion, Otterup
Referee: Michael Tykgaard

=== Second leg ===
19 June 2010
15:00 CEST (UTC+2)

BK Skjold	4 – 3	Otterup B&I
Mathias W. Nielsen 12'; Morten K. Nielsen 28', 80'; Mikkel Nøhr 40'; Sigurd Jeppson (red card) 90'	(in Danish) Report	Klaus Larsen 60'; Mads Jensen 65'; Thomas Johansen 78'

Østerbro Stadion, Copenhagen
Referee: Lars Skibild Jensen

Otterup B&I lose 4 – 5 on aggregate and are relegated to the 2010–11 Danish Series (later annulled)

== See also ==
- 2009-10 in Danish football
