= 1999–2000 Danish Cup =

46th installment of the Danish Cup

Tournament details
- Country: Denmark

Final positions
- Champions: Viborg FF (first title)
- Runners-up: AaB Fodbold

The 1999–2000 Danish Cup was the 46th season of the Danish Cup, the highest football competition in Denmark. The final was played on 1 June 2000.

Viborg won the title for the first time in club history.

== First round ==
Team 1	Score	Team 2
Albertslund IF	1–3	AB 70
Allested U&IF	0–1 (a.e.t.)	IK Skovbakken
Aulum IF	0–0 (a.e.t.) (5–3 p)	Vorup Frederiksberg BK
Brændekilde-Bellinge BK	2–1 (a.e.t.)	Lindholm IF
Egebjerg IF	1–3	Assens FC
Farum BK	1–2	Roskilde BK
FC Fredericia	2–3	B 1913
Humlebæk BK	5–1	Tårup IF
Jetsmark IF	1–3	Dalum IF
Kastrup BK	2–3	FC Bornholm
KFUM København	0–1	Skovshoved IF
Kolding BK	0–1	Randers Freja
Kolding KFUM	2–3	Frederikshavn fI
Lejerbo BK	0–6	Holbæk B&I
Maribo BK	3–5	B 1908
Middelfart G&BK	2–1	IF Lyseng
Måløv BK	4–1	Gentofte-Vangede IF
Nykøbing FA	2–1	Tårnby BK
Næsbjerg-Rousthøje UI	2–2 (a.e.t.) (6–5 p)	Hjørring AIK Frem
Næsby BK	4–6 (a.e.t.)	Kolding IF
Osted IF	1–7	Kalundborg GB
BK Prespa	0–8	Ølstykke FC
Raklev GI	0–1	Vanløse IF
Sjørring BK	1–7	Bramming BK
Stenløse BK	4–2	IF Skjold Skævinge
AIK 65 Strøby	2–4	Virum/Sorgenfri BK
Suså IF	2–9	Slagelse B&I
Søllested IF	0–11	Hellerup IK
Tjørring IF	0–4	Aalborg Chang
Viby IF	4–3	Skive IK
Vildbjerg SF	2–1	Hobro IK
Aarhus IF 1900	1–4	Nørresundby BK

== Second round ==
Team 1	Score	Team 2
AB 70	0–4	BK Frem
Aulum IF	1–2	Aalborg Chang
B 1908	3–2 (a.e.t.)	Næstved BK
Brønshøj BK	1–2	Hvidovre IF
B 1909	1–0	Dalum IF
Brændekilde-Bellinge BK	0–9	Frederikshavn fI
Bramming BK	3–4	Kolding IF
FC Bornholm	2–5	Holbæk B&I
Glostrup IF 32	2–1	Hellerup IK
Holstebro BK	0–3	B 1913
Humlebæk BK	4–2	Kalundborg GB
Middelfart G&BK	0–3	Randers Freja
Måløv BK	5–2	Vanløse IF
Nykøbing FA	2–4	Skovshoved IF
Næsbjerg-Rousthøje UI	1–2 (a.e.t.)	Vildbjerg SF
Roskilde BK	1–3 (a.e.t.)	Ølstykke FC
Slagelse B&I	2–3	IK Skovbakken
Stenløse BK	1–2	Virum/Sorgenfri BK
Viby IF	2–1	Nørresundby BK
Assens FC	0–2	Svendborg fB

== Third round ==
Team 1	Score	Team 2
Glostrup IF 32	4–0	Ølstykke FC
Vildbjerg SF	2–5	AC Horsens
Frederikshavn fI	1–6	FC Midtjylland
BK Frem	2–1 (a.e.t.)	Hvidovre IF
Haderslev FK	3–1	Randers Freja
Humlebæk BK	0–1	Fremad Amager
Kolding IF	5–2	IK Skovbakken
Måløv BK	2–1	Holbæk B&I
Skovshoved IF	1–8	B.93
Svendborg fB	2–1	B 1909 Odense
Viby IF	0–2	B 1913
Virum/Sorgenfri BK	3–0	B 1908
Aalborg Chang	2–4 (a.e.t.)	Aarhus Fremad

== Fourth round ==
Team 1	Score	Team 2
AC Horsens	0–2	Aarhus Fremad
Svendborg fB	0–2	Viborg FF
B 1913 Odense	3–6	FC Midtjylland
BK Frem	1–3	Esbjerg fB
Haderslev FK	3–4	B.93
Glostrup IF 32	2–1	Aarhus GF
Kolding IF	0–5	F.C. Copenhagen
Køge BK	2–2 (a.e.t.) (2–4 p)	Silkeborg IF
Måløv BK	3–4	Fremad Amager
Virum/Sorgenfri BK	0–1	Odense BK

== Fifth round ==
Team 1	Score	Team 2
B.93	0–4	Brøndby IF
Esbjerg fB	1–0	Odense BK
FC Midtjylland	0–0 (a.e.t.) (4–5 p)	AaB
FC Aarhus	3–2 (a.e.t.)	Vejle BK
Fremad Amager	3–9	Viborg FF
Glostrup IF 32	2–4	Lyngby BK
AB	1–0	Herfølge BK
F.C. Copenhagen	2–0	Silkeborg IF

== Quarter-finals ==
Team 1	Score	Team 2
Esbjerg fB	1–2	AaB
F.C. Copenhagen	1–1 (a.e.t.) (3–4 p)	AB
FC Aarhus	0–1	Brøndby IF
Lyngby BK	2–3 (a.e.t.)	Viborg FF

== Semi-finals ==
Team 1	Agg.	Team 2	1st leg	2nd leg
AB	2–3	AaB	1–1	1–2
Viborg FF	1–1 (5–4 p)	Brøndby IF	1–0	0–1 (a.e.t.)

== Final ==
1 June 2000
15:00 CEST

AaB	0–1	Viborg FF
	Report	Eklund 9'

Parken Stadium, Copenhagen
Attendance: 18,098
Referee: Knud Erik Fisker
