= Casper Johansen =

Danish footballer (born 1988)

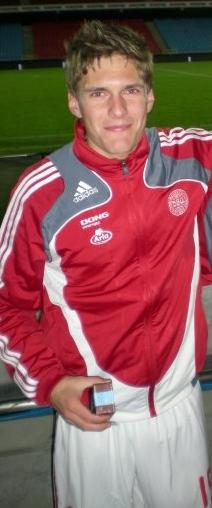

Personal information
- Full name: Casper Verum Nygaard Johansen
- Date of birth: July 28, 1988 (age 38)
- Place of birth: Denmark
- Height: 1.84 m (6 ft 0 in)
- Position: Forward

Team information
- Current team: Horsens fS (player-assistant)

Youth career
- –2006: FC Horsens

Senior career*
Years	Team	Apps	(Gls)
2006–2011	AC Horsens	50	(17)
2010	→ Kolding FC (loan)	15	(6)
2011	Kolding FC	14	(4)
2011–2012	FC Fyn	30	(28)
2012–2014	Holstein Kiel	51	(13)
2014–2021	Middelfart		
2022–	Horsens fS		

International career
2006	Denmark U-18	3	(1)
2006	Denmark U-19	4	(2)
2008	Denmark U-20	1	(0)
2009	Denmark U-21	1	(0)

Managerial career
- 2021–2022: Middelfart (assistant)
- 2022–: Horsens fS (player-assistant)
- * Club domestic league appearances and goals

Casper Verum Nygaard Johansen (born 28 July 1988) is a Danish retired footballer.

In 2007, Johansen made a breakthrough to AC Horsens first team, making several appearances, and on October 28, he scored his first Superliga goal in an away match against FC Nordsjælland. A match which AC Horsens won 2–1.
