= Kevin Schmidt (footballer) =

Danish footballer (born 1988)

Personal information
- Date of birth: 11 December 1988 (age 37)
- Place of birth: Denmark
- Position: Midfielder

Team information
- Current team: BSV
- Number: 8

Youth career
- Albertslund IF
- Lyngby BK

Senior career*
Years	Team	Apps	(Gls)
2008–2010	Lyngby BK	15	(1)
2010	FCK Reserves		
2010–2012	Hellerup IK		
2012	Víkingur	4	(0)
2012–2013	AB Reserves		
2013–	BSV		
- * Club domestic league appearances and goals as of 8 March 2015

Kevin Schmidt (born 11 December 1988) is a Danish professional football midfielder, who currently plays for the BSV.
