= 2010–11 Danish 1st Division =

66th season of Danish 1st Division

Danish 1st Division
- Season: 2010–11
- Champions: AGF
- Promoted: AGF, HB Køge
- Relegated: FC Fyn, Hvidovre IF, Kolding FC
- Matches: 240
- Goals: 750 (3.13 per match)
- Top goalscorer: Peter Graulund, AGF (20 goals)

The 2010–11 Danish 1st Division season was the 15th season of the Danish 1st Division league championship, governed by the Danish Football Association. It is set to start on 6 August 2010 with the recently relegated HB Køge facing off against last season's eighth-place finisher FC Fyn. The final matches of the season are scheduled for 29 May 2011.

This will be the last season with a sixteen-club First Division. As only one team will be promoted from the Second Divisions, the league will be reduced to fourteen teams from the next season and eventually to twelve teams in the following season (2012–13), switching to the same system as the Superliga with three round-robin rounds and two relegation spots.

On March 4, 2011 Vejle BK and Kolding FC's application for a cooperation forming Vejle Boldklub Kolding was accepted by the Danish FA. This means that the company behind Kolding FC will fold and the club's license will revert to Kolding IF, who will be relegated to the Denmark Series.

The division-champion and runners-up are promoted to the 2011–12 Danish Superliga. The teams in the 14th, 15th and 16th places are relegated to either 2nd Division East or West, based on their respective locations. No matter what position Kolding FC finishes in, they will be relegated to the Denmark Series.

== Participants ==
Locations of the Danish 1st Division 2010–11 teams

Club	Finishing position last season	First season of current spell in 1st Division
Aarhus GF	11th in Superliga	2010–11
AB	4th	2004–05
Brønshøj BK	1st in 2nd Division East	2010–11
FC Fredericia	3rd	2001–02
FC Fyn	8th	2009–10
FC Hjørring	1st in 2nd Division West	2010–11
FC Roskilde	11th	2008–09
FC Vestsjælland	5th	2009–10
HB Køge	12th in Superliga	2010–11
Hobro IK	2nd in 2nd Division West	2010–11
Hvidovre IF	12th	2007–08
Kolding FC	13th	2005–06
Næstved BK	6th	2006–07
Skive IK	9th	2007–08
Vejle BK	10th	2009–10
Viborg FF	4th	2008–09

== League table ==
Pos	Team	Pld	W	D	L	GF	GA	GD	Pts	Promotion or relegation
1	AGF (C, P)	30	22	6	2	66	25	+41	72	Promotion to Danish Superliga
2	HB Køge (P)	30	19	4	7	58	35	+23	61	Promotion to Danish Superliga
3	Vejle BK	30	14	10	6	49	32	+17	52	
4	Skive IK	30	13	8	9	55	47	+8	47	
5	Brønshøj	30	13	7	10	38	38	0	46	
6	Fredericia	30	13	6	11	53	41	+12	45	
7	Vestsjælland	30	10	12	8	58	57	+1	42	
8	FC Roskilde	30	11	9	10	45	45	0	42	
9	AB	30	9	10	11	48	49	−1	37	
10	Næstved BK	30	8	9	13	43	44	−1	33	
11	Viborg FF	30	9	6	15	37	43	−6	33	
12	Hobro	30	8	9	13	41	55	−14	33	
13	Hjørring	30	8	9	13	40	57	−17	33	
14	Kolding FC (R)	30	6	12	12	38	53	−15	30	Relegation to Denmark Series (Note: Kolding FC relegated to the Denmark Series because of their cooperation with Vejle BK. If Kolding FC had finished outside of the relegation spots, four teams total would have been relegated)
15	Fyn (R)	30	6	8	16	45	60	−15	26	Relegation to 2011–12 Danish 2nd Divisions
16	Hvidovre IF (R)	30	6	5	19	36	69	−33	23	Relegation to 2011–12 Danish 2nd Divisions

Source: Danish Football Association
Rules for classification: 1) points; 2) goal difference; 3) number of goals scored.
(C) Champions; (P) Promoted; (R) Relegated

== Managerial changes ==
Team	Outgoing manager	Manner of departure	Date of vacancy	Replaced by	Date of appointment	Position in table
Aarhus GF	(Denmark) Erik Rasmussen	Sacked	20 May 2010	(Denmark) Peter Sørensen	1 July 2010	Pre-Season
Næstved BK	(Denmark) Kim Poulsen	Mutual consent	30 June 2010	(Denmark) Brian Flies	1 July 2010	Pre-Season
FC Roskilde	(Denmark) Martin Jungsgaard	End of contract	30 June 2010	(Denmark) Carsten Broe	1 July 2010	Pre-Season
Hobro IK	(Denmark) Søren Kusk	End of contract	30 June 2010	(Denmark) Jan Østergaard	1 July 2010	Pre-Season
AB	(Denmark) Flemming Christensen	End of contract	30 June 2010	(Denmark) Kasper Kurland	1 July 2010	Pre-Season
FC Fredericia	(Denmark) Peter Sørensen	Signed by Aarhus GF	30 June 2010	(Denmark) Thomas Thomasberg	1 July 2010	Pre-Season
FC Hjørring	(Denmark) Thomas Thomasberg	Signed by FC Fredericia	30 June 2010	(Denmark) Kim Poulsen	1 July 2010	Pre-Season
Hobro IK	(Denmark) Jan Østergaard	Sacked	2 November 2010	(Denmark) Jens Hammer Sørensen	2 November 2010	11th
Viborg FF	(Denmark) Lars Søndergaard	Sacked	24 November 2010	(Denmark) Steffen Højer & (Denmark) Søren Frederiksen	24 November 2010	13th
Hobro IK	(Denmark) Jens Hammer Sørensen	Mutual consent	26 November 2010	(Denmark) Jakob Michelsen	8 January 2011	11th
Hvidovre IF	(Denmark) Kenneth Brylle Larsen	End of contract	31 December 2010	(Denmark) Per Nielsen	1 January 2011	14th
Kolding FC	(Denmark) Jens Letort	End of contract	31 December 2010	(Denmark) Kim Fogh	1 January 2011	10th
Vejle BK	(Sweden) Mats Gren	Sacked	12 April 2011	(Denmark) Viggo Jensen	14 April 2011	3rd
FC Hjørring	(Denmark) Kim Poulsen	Signed by Tanzania u-21	26 April 2011	(Denmark) Ove Christensen	7 May 2011	13th

== See also ==
- 2010-11 in Danish football
