= 2007–08 Danish 2nd Divisions =

Danish 2nd Divisions
- Season: 2007–08

The 2007–08 season in Danish 2nd Division was divided in two groups. The two winners were promoted to the 2008–09 Danish 1st Division, together with the winner of a promotion game between the two runners-up. Second squad teams can not promote, or play in the promotion game.

== Participants ==
Club	Group	Finishing position last season	First season of current spell in 2nd Divisions
AaB 2	West	1st in Denmark Series Pool 2	2007-08
AB 70	West	12th	2005–06
AGF 2	West	3rd in Denmark Series Pool 2	2007–08
B 1908	East	3rd in Denmark Series Pool 1	2007-08
B.93	East	6th	2005–06
BK Skjold	East	13th	2006–07
BK Søllerød-Vedbæk	East	13th	2005–06
Brabrand IF	West	14th in 1st Division	2007–08
Brøndby 2	East	2nd	2005–06
Brønshøj BK	East	9th	2006–07
Esbjerg 2	West	6th	2005–06
FC Fyn	West	3rd	2004–05
FC Hjørring	West	10th	1999–00
FC Roskilde	East	4th	2004–05
Fremad Amager	East	16th in 1st Division	2007–08
Glostrup FK	East	13th	1999–00
Greve Fodbold	East	10th	2006–07
Hobro IK	West	7th	2006–07
Holbæk B&I	East	8th	2003–04
Holstebro BK	West	12th	1999–00
Ikast FS (FCM 2)	West	2nd	2006–07
Jetsmark IF	West	5th	2002–03
KB (FCK 2)	East	5th	2005–06
Næsby BK	West	8th	2004–05
OB 2	West	2nd in Denmark Series Pool 2	2007–08
Skovlunde IF	East	11th	2006–07
Slagelse B&I	East	7th	2002–03
Stenløse BK	East	12th	2005–06
Thisted FC	West	15th in 1st Division	2007–08
Vanløse IF	West	1st in Denmark Series Pool 1	2007–08
Varde IF	West	11th	2005–06
Værløse BK	East	1st in Denmark Series Pool 1	2007–08

== East group ==
Pos	Team	Pld	W	D	L	GF	GA	GD	Pts	Promotion or relegation
1	FC Roskilde (C, P)	30	21	5	4	64	29	+35	68	Promotion to Danish 1st Division
2	Fremad Amager (P)	30	20	3	7	63	34	+29	63	Qualification to Promotion game
3	Brønshøj	30	19	3	8	61	45	+16	60	
4	Brøndby 2	30	17	8	5	75	38	+37	59	
5	Slagelse B&I	30	15	4	11	49	49	0	49	
6	KB (FCK 2)	30	12	8	10	54	38	+16	44	
7	Skovlunde IF	30	14	1	15	47	47	0	43	
8	Skjold	30	11	7	12	45	55	−10	40	
9	B.93	30	11	6	13	48	51	−3	39	
10	Greve	30	10	6	14	41	57	−16	36	
11	Glostrup FK	30	11	2	17	45	55	−10	35	
12	Stenløse BK	30	9	6	15	37	50	−13	33	
13	Søllerød-Vedbæk	30	11	0	19	38	60	−22	33	
14	Værløse BK	30	9	4	17	39	55	−16	31	
15	B 1908 (R)	30	7	4	19	44	62	−18	25	Relegation to Denmark Series
16	Holbæk (R)	30	6	7	17	39	64	−25	25	Relegation to Denmark Series

Source: Danish Football Association
Rules for classification: 1) points; 2) goal difference; 3) number of goals scored.
(C) Champions; (P) Promoted; (R) Relegated

== West group ==
Pos	Team	Pld	W	D	L	GF	GA	GD	Pts	Promotion or relegation
1	Thisted FC (C, P)	30	21	6	3	66	19	+47	69	Promotion to Danish 1st Division
2	Brabrand	30	19	6	5	70	28	+42	63	Qualification to Promotion game
3	Fyn	30	19	6	5	60	31	+29	63	
4	OB 2	30	13	8	9	48	39	+9	47	
5	AGF 2	30	13	7	10	70	61	+9	46	
6	AaB 2	30	13	5	12	56	47	+9	44	
7	Esbjerg 2	30	12	5	13	50	49	+1	41	
8	Ikast FS (FCM 2)	30	11	5	14	54	64	−10	38	
9	Hobro	30	9	9	12	52	51	+1	36	
10	Jetsmark IF	30	9	8	13	38	54	−16	35	
11	Varde IF	30	8	9	13	39	63	−24	33	
12	Vanløse IF	30	9	5	16	41	61	−20	32	
13	Hjørring	30	7	9	14	36	49	−13	30	
14	Næsby BK	30	7	9	14	40	61	−21	30	
15	AB 70 (R)	30	6	11	13	34	53	−19	29	Relegation to Denmark Series
16	Holstebro (R)	30	6	8	16	33	57	−24	26	Relegation to Denmark Series

Source: Danish Football Association
Rules for classification: 1) points; 2) goal difference; 3) number of goals scored.
(C) Champions; (P) Promoted; (R) Relegated

== Promotion game ==
The two runners-up will play promotion game on home and away basis.

Team 1	Agg.	Team 2	1st leg	2nd leg
Brabrand IF	0–4	Fremad Amager	0–1	0–3

=== First leg ===
2008-06-18
19:00

Brabrand IF	0–1	Fremad Amager
		Josephsen 8'

Brabrand Stadion, Århus
Attendance: 729
Referee: Nicolai Vollquartz

=== Second leg ===
2008-06-21
15:00

Fremad Amager	3–0	Brabrand IF
Jochumsen 3'; Abdalas 39'; Holmberg 83'

Sundby Idrætspark, Copenhagen
Referee: Anders Hermansen
