= Boye Habekost =

Danish footballer and coach (born 1968)

Personal information
- Full name: Boye Habekost
- Date of birth: 22 September 1968 (age 58)
- Place of birth: [Grindsted], Denmark
- Position: Goalkeeper

Team information
- Current team: Give Fremad (manager)

Youth career
- Billund IF/ Vejle Boldklub

Senior career*
Years	Team	Apps	(Gls)
1985–1993	Vejle Boldklub	55	(0)
1993–1997	FC Fredericia	105	(0)
1997–1998	Esbjerg fB	14	(0)
1998–2002	Vejle Boldklub	49	(0)

Managerial career
- 2010–2011: FC Vestsjælland (assistant)
- 2011–2012: FC Hjørring head coach
- 2012–2013: SønderjyskE assistant (youth)
- 2014: KSC Harte JS head coach
- 2014–2015: Kolding IF head coach
- 2015–2017: Billund IF head coach
- 2017–2018: Give Fremad head coach
- * Club domestic league appearances and goals

Boye Habekost (born 22 September 1968) is a Danish football coach and a former player who is manager at Give Fremad
