= 2009–10 Danish 1st Division =

65th season of Danish 1st Division

Danish 1st Division
- Season: 2009–10

The 2009–10 Danish 1st Division season marked the 14th season of the league operating as the second tier of Danish football and the 70th season overall under the 1st Division name. The league is governed by the Danish Football Association (DBU).

The division-champion, AC Horsens, and runners-up, Lyngby BK, were promoted to the 2010–11 Danish Superliga. The teams in the 14th, 15th and 16th places, Thisted FC, BK Frem and Brabrand IF, were relegated to either 2nd Division East or West, based on their respective locations.

== Participants ==
Locations of the Danish 1st Division 2009–10 teams

Club	Finishing position last season	First season of current spell in 1st Division
AB	3rd	2004–05
AC Horsens	12th in Superliga	2009–10
BK Frem	11th	2004–05
Brabrand IF	3rd in 2nd Division West	2009–10
FC Fredericia	7th	2001–02
FC Fyn	1st in 2nd Division West	2009–10
FC Roskilde	10th	2008–09
FC Vestsjælland	1st in 2nd Division East	2009–10
Hvidovre IF	8th	2007–08
Kolding FC	12th	2005–06
Lyngby BK	6th	2008–09
Næstved BK	5th	2006–07
Skive IK	13th	2007–08
Thisted FC	9th	2008–09
Vejle BK	11th in Superliga	2009–10
Viborg FF	4th	2008–09

== League table ==
Pos	Team	Pld	W	D	L	GF	GA	GD	Pts	Promotion or relegation
1	Horsens (P)	30	21	3	6	67	27	+40	66	Promotion to Danish Superliga
2	Lyngby Boldklub (P)	30	19	5	6	59	39	+20	62	Promotion to Danish Superliga
3	Fredericia	30	18	5	7	56	22	+34	59	
4	AB	30	15	9	6	47	30	+17	54	
5	Vestsjælland	30	14	8	8	56	46	+10	50	
6	Næstved BK	30	13	5	12	44	34	+10	44	
7	Viborg FF	30	10	14	6	30	26	+4	44	
8	Fyn	30	12	6	12	42	51	−9	42	
9	Skive IK	30	13	2	15	44	52	−8	41	
10	Vejle BK	30	7	12	11	33	34	−1	33	
11	FC Roskilde	30	9	6	15	37	51	−14	33	
12	Hvidovre IF	30	7	11	12	37	43	−6	32	
13	Kolding FC	30	8	7	15	41	59	−18	31	
14	Thisted FC (R)	30	8	6	16	33	57	−24	30	Relegation to Danish 2nd Divisions
15	Frem (R)	30	7	7	16	38	59	−21	28	Relegation to Danish 2nd Divisions
16	Brabrand (R)	30	1	10	19	18	52	−34	13	Relegation to Danish 2nd Divisions

Source: Danish Football Association
Rules for classification: 1) points; 2) goal difference; 3) number of goals scored.
(P) Promoted; (R) Relegated

== Managerial changes ==
Team	Outgoing manager	Manner of departure	Date of vacancy	Replaced by	Date of appointment	Position in table
Vejle BK	(Denmark) Lasse Christensen	End of tenure as caretaker	30 June 2009	(Sweden) Mats Gren	1 July 2009	Pre-Season
AC Horsens	(Denmark) Henrik Jensen	Sacked	30 June 2009	(Denmark) Johnny Mølby	1 July 2009	Pre-Season
Viborg FF	(Denmark) Søren Frederiksen	Stepped down	30 June 2009	(Denmark) Lars Søndergaard	1 July 2009	Pre-Season
BK Frem	(Denmark) Anders Theil	Mutual consent	30 June 2009	(Denmark) Christian Andersen	1 July 2009	Pre-Season
Kolding FC	(Denmark) Frank Andersen	Mutual consent	9 September 2009	(Denmark) Jens Letort	10 September 2009	14th

== See also ==
- 2009-10 in Danish football
