= Kolding FC =

Former Danish football club

- Full name: Kolding Fodbold Club
- Nickname: Ørnene (The Eagles)
- Short name: KFC
- Founded: 2002
- Dissolved: 2011
- Ground: Kolding Stadion
- Capacity: 10,000
- 2010–11: 1st Division, 14th of 16 (relegated)
Home colours	Away colours	Third colours

Kolding Fodbold Club, commonly known as Kolding FC, was a Danish association football club based in Kolding. Founded in 2002 as a merger between local clubs Kolding IF and Kolding Boldklub, the club turned professional on 11 November 2006, receiving permission from the Danish Football Association (DBU) to sign contracts. Prior to this, the club was the highest-ranked amateur team in Denmark. In 2011, Kolding FC merged with Vejle Boldklub, but the merger ended in 2013, and Kolding FC was not reestablished.

== History ==
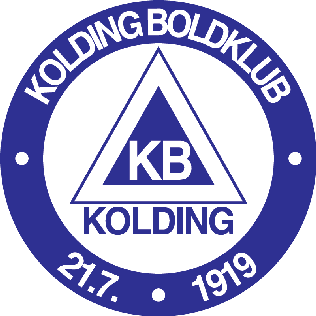
Logos of the two mother clubs, Kolding IF and Kolding Boldklub

Kolding FC's brief history began with a merger between the two oldest football clubs in Kolding, Kolding IF and Kolding Boldklub, which took effect on 1 January 2002 after extensive negotiations.

In their first complete season as Kolding FC (2002–03), the club, recently relegated from the Danish 1st Division, finished ninth out of sixteen in the Danish 2nd Division. The following season (2003–04), the team fell just one point short of promotion back to the 1st Division, missing the opportunity after losses to Dalum and Næstved.

In the 2004–05 season, Kolding FC topped the 2nd Division with a record of 23 wins, 7 losses, and no draws, securing promotion back to the 1st Division.

By the winter break of the 2005–06 season, the team was in third place, exceeding expectations of finishing in the top 11. They needed just two points to secure second place for promotion to the Superliga, but ultimately finished sixth after adjusting their expectations to a top-five finish, following four losses and a draw in the final matches.

The club merged with Vejle Boldklub in 2011 under the name Vejle Boldklub Kolding. The merger was dissolved in 2013 when Kolding IF chose to withdraw from the collaboration.

=== Nike sponsorship ===
On 6 March 2007, Kolding FC announced a five-year sponsorship deal with Nike, Inc. The chairman, Jens Haugaard, described the agreement as "extremely big for a 1st Division club." The sponsorship has been said to be worth "more than DKK 3 million" and "DKK 5 million". The deal included the following components:

- Provision of all clothing for all teams within the club and its parent clubs, Kolding IF and Kolding Boldklub, including training and match kits
- An undisclosed monetary amount
- A yearly friendly match against the highest-ranked other Danish Nike-sponsored team (then OB)
- In return, Kolding FC was required to make itself available for a yearly match against a lower-ranked Nike-sponsored team

== Stadium ==
Kolding FC used to host their home matches at Kolding Stadium, which was established in 1931. The stadium underwent modernisation efforts, including the addition of a VIP section; however, further renovations were halted due to restrictions imposed by Kolding Municipality. Consequently, plans for a new stadium were proposed, with potential locations either near Kolding Hallerne.

== Colours and badge ==
Club crest used until the 2005–06 season

=== Until 2005–06 ===
The crest (in round shape) was introduced at the club's foundation in 2002. The eagle was also pictured – in a larger format – on the shirts of the club at that time. This crest was designed by a local advertising agency, Schultz & Sørensen.

Club crest (ongoing)

=== Crest 2006–13 ===
The crest adopted by the club had a more badge-like shape than its predecessor. Along with the change in crest, new jerseys were introduced, replacing the classic blue and white uniform with a more distinctive maroon and black design. Following the Nike sponsorship in 2007, the colour of the shorts was changed to white.

== Supporters ==
Kolding FC's official fan club was known as Kolding FC Support.

In terms of support, the club faced competition from the local handball club KIF Kolding, which consistently ranked among the top teams in Danish handball for several years.

== Season-by-season results ==
Season	League performance									Cup performance
Season	Pos	Pts	Pld	W	D	L	GF	GA	GD	Cup performance
10–11: Danish 1st division	#14/16	30	30	6	12	12	38	53	−15	10–11: Eliminated in the 2nd round by Viby IF, 0–0 aet, 2–3 (pen.)
09-10: Danish 1st division	#13/16	31	30	8	7	15	41	59	−18	09-10: Eliminated in the 2nd round by Hobro, 1–2
08-09: Danish 1st division	#12/16	36	30	9	9	12	45	59	−14	08-09: Eliminated in the 1st round by SønderjyskE, 1–2
07-08: Danish 1st division	#7/16	40	30	11	7	12	53	47	+6	07-08: Eliminated in the 4th round by Næstved BK, 2–5
06-07: Danish 1st division	#5/16	49	30	14	7	9	58	53	+5	06-07: Eliminated in the 4th round by Lyngby BK, 1–5
05-06: Danish 1st division	#6/16	46	30	14	4	12	50	50	±0	05-06: Eliminated in the 5th round by Odense BK, 1–1 AET (4–5 PSO)
04-05: Danish 2nd division	#1/16	69	30	23	0	7	63	30	+23	04-05: Eliminated in the 2nd round by Aarhus Fremad, 2–4
03-04: Danish 2nd division	#4/16	52	30	15	7	8	54	41	+13	03-04: Eliminated in the 2nd round by Skive IK, 1–3
02-03: Danish 2nd division	#9/16	37	30	10	7	13	40	52	−12	02-03: Eliminated in the 4th round by Silkeborg IF, 0–4

Green denotes promotion, red denotes relegation.

== See also ==
- Kolding IF
- Kolding Boldklub
- Fionia Bank Cup
