= 2008–09 Danish 1st Division =

64th season of Danish 1st Division

Danish 1st Division
- Season: 2008–09

The 2008–09 Danish 1st Division (known as the Viasat Divisionen due to sponsorship by Viasat) season marked the 13th season of the league operating as the second tier of Danish football and the 769th season overall under the 1st Division name. The league is governed by the Danish Football Association (DBU).

The division-champion and runner-up will be promoted to the 2009–10 Danish Superliga. The teams in the 14th, 15th and 16th places will be divided between 2nd Division East and West, based on location.

On 3 February, Køge Boldklub declared bankruptcy. As a result, they were docked three points and were suspended from the tournament. Furthermore, they will be relegated two levels in addition to the one they have clinched at the moment, making them participate in Sjællandsserien from the 2009–10 season.

On 14 February, however, it was announced that First Division clubs Køge Boldklub and Herfølge Boldklub intended to merge their first teams to form HB Køge, and on 14 March, the club was approved by the Danish FA.

== Participants ==
Locations of the Danish 1st Division 2008–09 teams

Club	Finishing position last season	First season of current spell in 1st Division
AB	6th	2004–05
BK Frem	11th	2004–05
FC Amager	2nd in 2nd Division East	2008–09
FC Fredericia	5th	2001–02
FC Roskilde	1st in 2nd Division East	2008–09
Herfølge BK	4th	2005–06
Hvidovre IF	9th	2007–08
Kolding FC	7th	2005–06
Køge BK	13th	2003–04
Lyngby BK	12th in Superliga	2008–09
Lolland-Falster Alliancen	12th	2007–08
Næstved BK	8th	2006–07
Silkeborg IF	3rd	2007–08
Skive IK	10th	2007–08
Thisted FC	1st in 2nd Division West	2008–09
Viborg FF	11th in Superliga	2008–09

== League table ==
Pos	Team	Pld	W	D	L	GF	GA	GD	Pts	Promotion or relegation
1	Herfølge Boldklub (P)	30	22	5	3	77	27	+50	71	Promotion to Danish Superliga
2	Silkeborg IF (P)	30	21	6	3	68	27	+41	69	Promotion to Danish Superliga
3	AB	30	19	4	7	56	29	+27	61	
4	Viborg FF	30	17	3	10	59	40	+19	54	
5	Næstved BK	30	14	10	6	55	34	+21	52	
6	Lyngby Boldklub	30	14	8	8	50	26	+24	50	
7	Fredericia	30	13	8	9	58	43	+15	47	
8	Hvidovre IF	30	11	7	12	51	46	+5	40	
9	Thisted FC	30	10	9	11	54	49	+5	39	
10	FC Roskilde	30	12	3	15	45	53	−8	39	
11	Frem	30	8	12	10	41	53	−12	36	
12	Kolding FC	30	9	9	12	45	59	−14	36	
13	Skive IK	30	9	7	14	49	57	−8	34	
14	LFA (R)	30	4	3	23	25	66	−41	15	Relegation to Danish 2nd Divisions
15	Amager (Note: Køge BK & FC Amager declared bankruptcy and was docked 3 points as a result. Furthermore, they have been suspended from the tournament, and while their current results will stand, the rest of their matches will be lost 0–3.) (R)	29	2	8	19	24	72	−48	11	Relegation to Copenhagen Series
16	Køge BK (R)	29	1	4	24	11	86	−75	4	Relegation to Zealand Series

Source: Danish FA
Rules for classification: 1) points; 2) goal difference; 3) number of goals scored.
(P) Promoted; (R) Relegated

== Results ==
Home \ Away	AB	BKF	FCA	FCF	FCR	HB	HIF	KFC	KBK	LFA	LBK	NBK	SIF	SIK	TFC	VFF
AB		1–1	3–0	1–2	2–0	0–4	3–2	2–1	3–0	1–0	0–1	2–1	0–2	3–2	4–0	2–1
Frem	0–3		3–0	0–0	2–0	0–0	2–1	2–2	3–0	4–0	1–1	1–1	2–1	1–4	1–3	0–6
Amager	0–1	2–2		2–2	0–3	1–2	0–3	0–3	– (Note: As both FC Amager and Køge BK had declared bankruptcy at the time of the match, no result was set and no points would be awarded to either side)	2–0	0–3	0–3	0–3	2–2	0–3	1–7
Fredericia	2–2	2–2	3–0		3–2	1–2	4–1	4–0	3–0	1–1	0–2	0–0	1–2	4–2	3–0	1–2
FC Roskilde	2–4	4–1	0–4	3–1		1–2	3–1	0–2	1–0	3–1	0–1	1–1	1–2	2–0	1–0	2–0
Herfølge Boldklub	2–0	3–0	2–2	4–2	5–0		3–2	3–0	8–1	1–0	1–1	0–1	1–3	3–1	4–1	4–0
Hvidovre IF	1–1	3–0	1–1	2–2	2–0	2–4		1–2	4–0	4–2	3–1	1–2	1–2	1–1	0–0	3–0
Kolding FC	0–4	2–2	3–2	3–1	4–2	1–4	2–3		0–0	1–0	1–4	2–2	1–4	2–2	1–1	1–3
Køge BK	0–2	3–2	2–2	0–3	0–3	0–3	0–3	0–3		1–1	0–3	0–3	0–3	1–4	0–3	2–3
LFA	0–1	0–3	3–0	0–2	2–2	1–2	0–2	0–1	3–0		0–3	0–4	1–2	5–1	1–2	3–2
Lyngby Boldklub	0–2	2–0	3–0	1–1	2–3	0–0	4–1	1–1	4–0	3–0		0–0	0–2	3–1	1–1	0–1
Næstved BK	1–0	1–1	2–2	3–0	4–3	0–2	3–0	2–2	5–0	1–0	1–1		1–2	0–0	5–3	0–1
Silkeborg IF	2–0	2–2	3–0	1–2	2–0	3–0	1–1	2–2	1–1	5–1	1–0	3–0		2–1	2–2	0–0
Skive IK	1–5	0–1	3–0	2–1	1–1	1–1	2–0	3–0	3–0	3–0	1–0	2–5	2–6		1–1	1–3
Thisted FC	2–2	2–2	1–1	2–4	4–0	0–3	0–1	2–1	4–0	7–0	1–3	4–1	1–2	3–2		1–1
Viborg FF	0–2	4–0	3–0	1–3	0–2	2–4	1–1	3–1	3–0	2–0	3–2	1–2	3–2	1–0	2–0	

Source: Danish FA
Legend: Blue = home team win; Yellow = draw; Red = away team win.

== Top goalscorers ==
Last updated: 12 June 2009; Source: Danish Football Association

Pos	Player	Scored for	Goals
1	(Denmark) Rajko Lekic	Silkeborg IF	20
2	(Kenya) Emmanuel Ake	Herfølge Boldklub	17
2	(Denmark) Rasmus Katholm	FC Fredericia	17
2	(Denmark) Jeppe Kjær	FC Roskilde	17
5	(Denmark) Ulrik Balling	Næstved Boldklub	16
5	(Denmark) Anders Clausen	Hvidovre IF	16
7	(Denmark) Henrik Pedersen	Silkeborg IF	13
7	(Denmark) Henrik Toft	Herfølge Boldklub	13
9	(Iceland) Rúrik Gíslason	Viborg FF	12
9	(Denmark) Anders Jochumsen	FC Amager	12

== Managerial changes ==
Team	Outgoing manager	Manner of departure	Date of vacancy	Replaced by	Date of appointment	Position in table
Kolding FC	(Denmark) Johnny Mølby	Moved to Aarhus GF	31 May 2008	(Denmark) Frank Andersen	1 July 2008	Pre-Season
Lolland-Falster Alliancen	(Denmark) Per Berg Larsen	End of tenure as caretaker	30 June 2008	(Denmark) Jesper Hansen	1 July 2008	Pre-Season
Køge BK	(Denmark) Henrik Larsen	Mutual consent	4 July 2008	(Denmark) Jimmy Kastrup	4 July 2008	Pre-Season
Lyngby BK	(Denmark) Kasper Hjulmand	Mutual consent	7 July 2008	(Denmark) Henrik Larsen	15 July 2008	Pre-Season
Lolland-Falster Alliancen	(Denmark) Jesper Hansen	Sacked	8 October 2008	(Denmark) Per Berg Larsen	8 October 2009	16th
Hvidovre IF	(Denmark) Tom Nielsen	Sacked	9 November 2008	(Denmark) Kenneth Brylle Larsen	1 January 2009	10th
Silkeborg IF	(Denmark) Peder Knudsen	Sacked	12 November 2008	(Denmark) Troels Bech	1 January 2009	5th
FC Fredericia	(Denmark) Jan Vingaard	Sacked	19 December 2008	(Denmark) Peter Sørensen	20 December 2008	11th
Lolland-Falster Alliancen	(Denmark) Per Berg Larsen	End of tenure as caretaker	31 December 2008	(Denmark) Jesper Tollefsen	1 January 2009	16th
Lyngby BK	(Denmark) Henrik Larsen	Sacked	29 March 2009	(Denmark) Niels Frederiksen	29 March 2009	5th
Viborg FF	(Sweden) Hans Eklund	Sacked	8 April 2009	(Denmark) Søren Frederiksen	9 April 2009	3rd
