= Glostrup FK =

Danish football club

Glostrup FK IF32
- Full name: Glostrup Fodbold Klub - Idrætsforening af 1932
- Nickname(s): –
- Founded: 1932 (as AIK Glostrup)
- Ground: Glostrup Stadion, Glostrup
- Capacity: 4,000
- Chairman: Henrik Kahr
- Manager: Thomas Wellemberg
- League: Denmark Series
- 2024–25: Denmark Series, promotion group 1, 10th of 10
Home colours	Away colours

Glostrup FK IF32 is a Danish football club which plays in the Denmark Series. They play at Glostrup Stadion in Glostrup on Zealand, which has a capacity of 4,000.

The club was formed in 2003 as a merger between Glostrup IF 32, Glostrup IC and Hvissinge FC. In 2009 the club was merged with Albertslund IF to form Boldklubberne Glostrup Albertslund. This merger was dissolved in 2015, and Glostrup FK reappeared in the Zealand Series.
