= Viby IF =

Danish sports club

- Full name: Viby Idrætsforening
- Founded: 9 June 1918; 107 years ago
- Ground: Viby Idrætspark, Viby J
- Capacity: 2,000
- Chairman: Alex Nørgaard
- Head coach: Anders Juul
- League: Denmark Series (V)
- 2022–23: Denmark Series Group 4, 3rd of 8
- Website: www.vibyfodbold.dk
Home colours

Viby Idrætsforening (Danish: [ˈvipyˀ ˈitʁætsfɒˌe̝ˀne̝ŋ]; commonly known as Viby IF) is a sports club based in Viby J, Aarhus Municipality, Denmark. Founded in 1918, the club features basketball, gymnastics, handball and tennis. The association football department, however, is the main activity and the largest sport in the club with approximately 500 members, of whom 275 are youth players. Currently, the club's first team plays in the Denmark Series, the fifth tier of the Danish football league system.

== History ==
The football team achieved its greatest sporting success in the 1954–55 Danish Cup, where the team reached the quarter-finals after, among other, defeating one of the then dominant clubs Kjøbenhavns Boldklub (KB) 2–1 in the round of 16. In the quarter-finals, Viby lost 2–1 to Odense Boldklub (OB).

In recent times, Viby also faced prominent top flight Danish Superliga teams in the national cup tournament. In 2008, they met local rivals AGF, who won 8–0, and in 2010 the opponent were UEFA Champions League participants from FC Copenhagen, who won with a more modest score: 4–1. They faced Copenhagen in the Danish Cup again in 2018, which ended in a 3–0 defeat, and faced Randers FC in 2019 in a 2–0 loss.

On 18 June 2011, Viby IF achieved promotion to the Danish 2nd Division (third-tier) for the first time in club history. This happened after Viby beat Frederikshavn fI 2–1 away in the Denmark Series, and as Odder IGF beat Aarhus Fremad (II) 2–1 at home, Viby took the promotion spot.
