= FC Fyn =

Association football club

- Full name: Football Club Fyn
- Short name: FCF
- Founded: 1 January 2006
- Dissolved: 31 January 2013
- Ground: Odense Stadion, Odense
Home colours	Away colours

FC Fyn was a Danish football club from Odense on Funen. The club was founded in 2006 and its first appearance was in the 2006–07 season.

FC Fyn played their home matches at Odense Atletikstadion, which is the current home ground of B 1909 and B 1913. The first manager was former Zambia national coach Roald Poulsen. Poulsen resigned for personal reasons in the end of 2007 and was replaced by Viggo Jensen.

The team's home shirt was half red and half blue, while the away shirt was yellow.

The club was declared bankrupt on 31 January 2013.

== Mother clubs ==
The club was a merger between three clubs from the Danish 2nd Division West, which were:

- B 1909
- B 1913
- Dalum IF

Following the dissolving of the club, the three mother clubs were reestablished in the lower leagues.

== Club statistics ==
Season	Competition	Position	Played	Won	Drawn	Lost	Score	Points
2012–13	1. Div	12th	33	2	8	23	26–84	11
2011–12	2. Div	1st	30	23	3	4	71–21	72
2010–11	1. Div	15th	30	6	8	16	45–60	26
2009–10	1. Div	8th	30	12	6	12	41–52	42
2008–09	2. Div	1st	30	19	7	4	75–32	64
2007–08	2. Div	3rd	30	19	6	5	60–31	63
2006–07	2. Div	3rd	26	15	4	7	68–51	49

=== All time league records ===
Competition	Seasons	Played	Won	Drawn	Lost	Score	Points
1 Div	3	93	20	22	51	112–196	79
2 Div	4	116	76	20	20	274–135	248
