= Herlev IF =

Danish football club

Coordinates: 55°44′08″N 12°25′19″E

- Full name: Herlev Idrætsforening
- Nickname(s): HI-Fodbold
- Founded: 12 May 1923; 101 years ago
- Ground: Herlev Stadium
- Capacity: 3,500
- League: Denmark Series (V)
Home colours	Away colours

Herlev Idrætsforening – Fodbold, also known as Herlev IF or HI-Fodbold, is a Danish football club located in the northwestern Copenhagen suburb, Herlev. The club is a member of the local association DBU Zealand under the Danish Football Association (DBU). Their home ground is Herlev Stadium. The football team functions as a subdivision of the multi-sports club Herlev Idrætsforening (HI), and since 1949, HI has been an umbrella organisation for almost all sports clubs in Herlev Municipality. The sports club has over 600 members.

== Recent history ==
Herlev suffered relegation from the fourth-tier Danish 3rd Division in its inaugural 2021–22 season, finishing bottom of the league table. In the 2022–23 season, the team competed in group 2 of the fifth-tier Denmark Series.
