= Stenløse Boldklub =

Danish football club

Stenløse
- Full name: Stenløse Boldklub
- Founded: 1911; 114 years ago, as Søsum-Viksø IF; 1974; 51 years ago, as Stenløse Boldklub
- Ground: Stenløse Stadium
- Capacity: 3,000
- Chairman: Kim Madsen
- Manager: Michael Wain Poulsen
- League: Zealand Series
- 2023–24: DBU Zealand Series 1, Group 1, 1st of 14 (promoted)
- Website: stenloese-bk.dk
Home colours	Away colours

Stenløse Boldklub is an association football club based in the town of Stenløse. The team currently plays in the Zealand Series, one of the sixth tiers of the Danish football league system and the highest tier of the local DBU Zealand.

Stenløse BK's home ground is the 3,000-capacity Stenløse Stadion.

In 2011, the club merged with the neighboring club Ølstykke FC and became SC Egedal. In 2015, Stenløse left the merger and continued under its old name.
