= Varde IF =

Danish football club

- Full name: Varde Idrætsforening
- Founded: 1 January 1975; 50 years ago
- Ground: Sydbank Stadium; Varde, Denmark
- Capacity: 4,000
- Chairman: Mette Marie Madsen
- Manager: Søren Pallesen
- League: Denmark Series
- 2021–22: Denmark Series Group 3, 9th of 10
Home colours	Away colours

Varde Idrætsforening is an association football club based in Varde, Southern Jutland, Denmark that competes in the Denmark Series, the fifth tier of the Danish football league system.

Founded in 1975 as a result of the merger between Varde Gymnastikforening (VG) and Varde Boldklub (VB), the club is affiliated to DBU Jutland, the regional football association. The team plays its home matches at Varde Stadium, which has a capacity of 4,000.

== History ==
Varde IF was formed by a merger of Varde Gymnastikforening (VG) and Varde Boldklub (VB) on 1 January 1975 after three previous attempts at a merger had failed. VG was founded in 1921, where they started out with gymnastics, cricket and association football. VB was founded in 1944 under the name Arbejdernes Boldklub, which, however, was changed in 1954 to Varde Boldklub, and remained a football club throughout its existence.

Varde IF's best cup result came in the 2010–11 Danish Cup, where the club's senior team made their way to the fourth round. There, they played against Superliga giants Brøndby IF on 22 September 2010, with the match ending in a 4–2 win for Varde. In the 2007–08, Varde also reached the fourth round of the Danish Cup, where they met the defending Danish champions from F.C. Copenhagen. The match ended with a 0–4 defeat in front of 3.279 spectators – a stadium record – at Varde Stadium.

Since 2010, the men's team has competed in the Danish 2nd Division or the Denmark Series, the third and fourth tier divisions, respectively.
