= Næsby Boldklub =

Danish football club

- Full name: Næsby Boldklub
- Short name: NB
- Founded: 1938
- Ground: ALPI Arena Næsby
- Capacity: 2,500
- Chairman: Peter Rasmussen
- Manager: Nicolai Wollenberg
- League: Danish 3rd Division
- 2025–26: Danish 3rd Division, 3rd of 12
- Website: https://www.naesbyboldklub.dk/
Home colours	Away colours

Næsby Boldklub is a Danish football club currently playing in the Danish 3rd Division, the fourth tier of Danish football. They play at ALPI Arena Næsby in Kirkendrup, Odense N. Their home ground has a capacity of 2,500.

== History ==
=== Early years ===
Næsby Boldklub was founded in 1938. In the first year of the club's existence, it played its home matches at Højløkke Allé: a highly questionable pitch which was therefore given the unfavourable nickname Grusgraven ("the gravel pit"). In 1950, Næsby Boldklub moved to a ground on Søren Eriksensvej, and in 1968 a new clubhouse was inaugurated which replace the so-called German barracks left behind following World War II. Since 1984, the club has been located on Stærehusvej in the Odense suburb of Kirkendrup.

In 1951, Næsby Boldklub promoted to Series 1, the sixth tier of Danish football. Five years later, the club reached promotion to the Funen Series, the highest division for men organised by the regional football association DBU Funen (DBUF) and then one of the fifth-highest divisions overall in the Danish football league system. By 1966, Næsby had reached the Denmark Series, the fourth level.

Næsby first reached national attention in 1969 when they reached the Round of 16 of the Danish Cup. About 14 years later – in 1983 – Næsby secured, via a 2–1 win over Vordingborg IF, promotion to the Danish 3rd Division. Many of the players who reached the historical promotion had played for the youth team of Næsby, which had reached the national finals for youth teams in 1977. The club moved to its current home, Næsby Stadium at Stærehusvej in 1984 after it had achieved promotion to the Danish 3rd Division the year before.

=== Recent years ===
Today, Næsby Boldklub has established itself as a divisional club. On 26 October 2011, Næsby reached its largest success when they beat Danish Superliga club Silkeborg IF 4–3 at home in the cup with Christian Jensen scoring the winner five minutes before the final whistle. Their cup run that year, however, ended in the following round when Næsby lost 5–1 at home to SønderjyskE. The club's best result in the Danish 2nd Division, the third tier of Danish football, occurred in the 2011–12 season, when Næsby ended in second place of the league table, surpassed only by the former Funen merger project, FC Fyn.

== Current squad ==
As of 10 September 2026

Note: Flags indicate national team as defined under FIFA eligibility rules; some limited exceptions apply. Players may hold more than one non-FIFA nationality.

No.	Pos.	Nation	Player
1	GK	DEN	Rasmus Jepsen-Jacob
2	DF	DEN	Alexander Molberg
4	DF	DEN	Oliver Vingaard
5	DF	DEN	Victor Vestby
6	MF	DEN	Mikkel Stangerup
7	MF	DEN	Julius Fechtenburg
8	MF	DEN	Louis Larsen
9	FW	DEN	Oliver Koertz
10	FW	DEN	Kasper Høst
11	FW	DEN	Magnus Schou
14	DF	DEN	Andreas Tomaselli
15	MF	DEN	Kasper Nyegaard
16	DF	DEN	Rasmus Knudsen

No.	Pos.	Nation	Player
18	MF	DEN	Anton Kjærgaard
19	MF	DEN	Mikkel Kunnerup
20	FW	DEN	Ronny Larsen
21	GK	DEN	Malang Faty
22	DF	DEN	Laurits Jensen
23	FW	DEN	Marcus Jensen
24	MF	DEN	Sebastian Vollerup
25	DF	DEN	Andreas Bahne
26	FW	DEN	Kristian Tonnisen
27	GK	DEN	Victor Thomsen
28	DF	DEN	Mads Jørgensen
33	DF	DEN	Magnus Carstensen
