= Boldklubben Skjold =

Association football club in Denmark

BK Skjold
- Full name: Boldklubben Skjold
- Nickname: Skjold
- Founded: 1915; 111 years ago
- Stadium: Østerbro Stadion, Østerbro
- Capacity: 7,000
- Chairman: Jan Sørensen
- League: Denmark Series (V)
- 2021–22: Copenhagen Series – Group 1, 1st of 13 (promoted)
- Website: http://www.bkskjold.dk/
Home colours	Away colours

Boldklubben Skjold af 1915 is a Danish football club based in Østerbro, Copenhagen. Founded in 1915, the club has over 3,800 members making it Denmark's biggest football club in terms of membership. BK Skjold's teams use either Fælledparken or Ryparken for their training sessions.

== History ==
In the 2011–2012 season Skjold played in the Danish 2nd Division West, the third-tier, due to a random draw after the promotions from the 4th tier league Danmarksserien resulted in an unbalance in teams playing in the East and West 2nd divisions. 18 teams were to play in the Danish 2nd Division East while only 14 teams were to play in the Danish 2nd Division West. To solve this problem, the Danish Football Association drew two random teams from the eastern division to play in the western division – This resulted in BK Skjold and Lolland-Falster Alliancen joining the Danish 2nd Division West. Skjold played their first game in Danish 2nd Division West on 7 August 2011 versus heavy favourites and Jutland-based Thisted FC and the game ended 2–2.

On 5 June 2012, Skjold were relegated to Danmarksserien, along with local Østerbro rivals, Boldklubben af 1893.

== Former BK Skjold players ==
- Per Frandsen
- Pierre-Emile Højbjerg
- Yussuf Poulsen
- Kenneth Zohore
- Nicolai Vallys
