= FC Rudersdal =

Danish football club

- Full name: FC Rudersdal
- Founded: 2020; 6 years ago
- Ground: Rundforbi Idrætsanlæg and Vedbæk Stadium; Nærum and Vedbæk, Denmark
- Capacity: 5,000
- Chairman: Søren Holm
- Manager: Anders Aaskoven
- League: Zealand Series
- 2023–24: Zealand Series, Group 1, 3rd of 14
Home colours	Away colours

FC Rudersdal (Danish pronunciation: [ʁuðɒsˈtɛːl]), is an association football club based in the municipality of Rudersdal, Denmark, that competes in the Zealand Series, the sixth tier of the Danish football league system. Founded in 2020 as a merger between BSV af 2016 and Rudersdal Boldklub, it is affiliated to DBU Zealand. The team plays its home matches at Rundforbi Idrætsanlæg and Vedbæk Stadium.

Organised football in the municipality had long been fragmented, with a number of clubs competing for members in a small region. Most notably, BK Søllerød-Vedbæk (BSV), stood out, reaching the Danish 2nd Division, the third tier of the Danish football league system. This club had been formed in 2002 as a merger between Søllerød Boldklub and Vedbæk Boldklub, but filed for bankruptcy in 2016. At its peak, former Danish international and player for Milan, Martin Laursen, coached the first team.

The logo of the former BK Søllerød-Vedbæk (BSV)
