= 1996–97 Danish Cup =

Tournament details
- Country: Denmark

Final positions
- Champions: F.C. Copenhagen
- Runners-up: Ikast FC

The 1996–97 Danish Cup was the 43rd season of the Danish Cup, the highest football competition in Denmark. The final was played on 8 May 1997.

== First round ==
Team 1	Score	Team 2
AC Horsens	11–0	Nørre Broby BK
Albertslund IF	3–3 (a.e.t.) (4–3 p)	Handelsstandes BK
Assens FC	2–4	Dalum IF
B 1908	3–3 (a.e.t.) (4–2 p)	Skælskør B&I
B 1913	2–0	Lystrup IF
B 67 Odense	4–3	Grenaa IF
IF Skjold Birkerød	2–0	Roskilde BK
Døllefjelde-Musse IF	1–3	Værløse BK
Eskilstrup BK	0–2	Virum/Sorgenfri BK
Haderslev FK	4–0	Asaa BK
Hammerum IF	1–1 (a.e.t.) (6–7 p)	Vejgaard BSK
Glostrup IF 32	3–0	Vanløse IF
Kløvermarkens fB	0–4	Holbæk B&I
Knudsker IF	4–2	Vordingborg IF
Kolding IF	2–1	Thisted FC
Nakskov BK	4–3 (a.e.t.)	Nykøbing FA
OKS	3–1	Dragør BK
Politiets IF	3–2 (a.e.t.)	IF Skjold Skævinge
Rishøj BK	4–0	Sorø IF Freja
Skive IK	10–0	Tarm IF
IK Skovbakken	3–2	Herning KFUM
Tved BK	6–1	Randers Freja
Tønder SF	0–2	Frederikshavn fI
Tårnby BK	2–4 (a.e.t.)	Stenløse BK
BK Union	1–6	Helsingør IF
Valby BK	4–2	Hagested IF
Varde IF	3–4	Nørresundby BK
Vedbæk BK	1–5 (a.e.t.)	BK Frem
Vejle BK	1–1 (a.e.t.) (5–4 p)	Odder IGF
Aalborg Chang	2–6	Aarhus Fremad
Aalborg Freja	2–3	Vejen SF
Aars IK	5–1	Billund IF

== Second round ==
Team 1	Score	Team 2
BK Avarta	4–1	B 1908
B 1909	4–0	AC Horsens
BK Frem	7–2	OKS
Haderslev FK	0–3	Dalum IF
Holstebro BK	4–0	Nørre Aaby IK
Glostrup IF 32	1–1 (a.e.t.) (1–3 p)	Nakskov BK
Knudsker IF	0–3	Hellerup IK
Kolding IF	3–2	Aars IK
Køge BK	1–1 (a.e.t.) (3–2 p)	Helsingør IF
Nørresundby BK	2–2 (a.e.t.) (3–4 p)	B 1913
Politiets IF	5–1	Stenløse BK
Rishøj BK	1–3	Ølstykke FC
IK Skovbakken	2–2 (a.e.t.) (3–5 p)	Frederikshavn fI
Valby BK	0–6	IF Skjold Birkerød
Vejen SF	5–2 (a.e.t.)	FC Fredericia
Vejgaard BSK	10–1	B 67 Odense
Vejle BK	2–3	Skive IK
Virum/Sorgenfri BK	5–3 (a.e.t.)	Holbæk B&I
Værløse BK	3–1	Albertslund IF
Aarhus Fremad	8–3	Tved BK

== Third round ==
Team 1	Score	Team 2
AB	5–1	Værløse BK
BK Avarta	3–2 (a.e.t.)	Køge BK
B.93	3–2 (a.e.t.)	IF Skjold Birkerød
B 1909	0–4	Kolding IF
Esbjerg fB	0–2	B 1913
BK Frem	3–1	Hellerup IK
Holstebro BK	3–2	Aarhus Fremad
Nakskov BK	1–2	Herning Fremad
Politiets IF	0–3	Brønshøj BK
Skive IK	4–0	Vejen SF
Svendborg fB	6–1	Frederikshavn fI
Vejgaard BSK	1–1 (a.e.t.) (6–5 p)	Dalum IF
Virum/Sorgenfri BK	0–1	Hvidovre IF
Ølstykke FC	2–0	Fremad Amager

== Fourth round ==
Team 1	Score	Team 2
AB	1–0	Svendborg fB
BK Avarta	0–1	Herfølge BK
B.93	1–1 (a.e.t.) (5–3 p)	Vejgaard BSK
B 1913	3–2 (a.e.t.)	Skive IK
Brønshøj BK	0–1	BK Frem
Holstebro BK	1–0	Viborg FF
Hvidovre IF	1–2 (a.e.t.)	F.C. Copenhagen
Ikast FS	1–0	Herning Fremad
Kolding IF	1–1 (a.e.t.) (4–5 p)	Ølstykke FC
Næstved BK	1–2	Vejle BK

== Fifth round ==
Team 1	Score	Team 2
B 1913	0–4	Silkeborg IF
B.93	2–3	Herfølge BK
Holstebro BK	2–4	F.C. Copenhagen
Lyngby BK	0–4	Ikast FS
Odense BK	6–1	AGF
Vejle BK	1–5 (a.e.t.)	Brøndby IF
AaB	2–0	BK Frem
Ølstykke FC	2–3	AB

== Quarter-finals ==
Team 1	Score	Team 2
AB	0–1	F.C. Copenhagen
Ikast FS	1–0	Odense BK
AaB	0–3	Brøndby IF
Herfølge BK	4–4 (a.e.t.) (3–4 p)	Silkeborg IF

== Semi-finals ==
Team 1	Agg.	Team 2	1st leg	2nd leg
Silkeborg IF	2–3	F.C. Copenhagen	1–1	1–2
Ikast FS	3–2	Brøndby IF	2–2	1–0

== Final ==
8 May 1997

F.C. Copenhagen	2–0	Ikast FS
Hemmingsen 72'; Nielsen 82'	Report

Parken Stadium, Copenhagen
Attendance: 17,368
Referee: Knud Stadsgaard
