= 1973–74 Danish Cup =

Tournament details
- Country: Denmark

Final positions
- Champions: Vanløse IF
- Runners-up: Odense BK

The 1973–74 Danish Cup was the 20th season of the Danish Cup, the highest football competition in Denmark. The final was played on 23 May 1974.

== First round ==
Team 1	Score	Team 2
B 47 Esbjerg	0–6	Ikast FS
Bolbro G&IF	2–5	Kolding KFUM
Brøndby IF	4–0	Nakskov BK
Brønderslev IF	1–2 (a.e.t.)	Svendborg fB
BK Dalgas	6–3 (a.e.t.)	Vordingborg IF
Dalum IF	3–2 (a.e.t.)	Romdrup-Klarup GF
Esbjerg fB	6–1	Houlbjerg-Laurbjerg IF
Frederikssund IK	3–4	Vanløse IF
BK Fremad Valby	1–3	B 1921
Hellas BK Valby	6–0	Nordlangelands IF
Herfølge BK	5–2	Rønne IK
Herning Fremad	4–2 (a.e.t.)	Middelfart G&BK
Hjørring IF	2–3	Tarp BK
Holstebro BK	0–3	Vejen SF
Humble BK	1–4	FC Skanderborg
Husum BK	3–3 (a.e.t.) (3–5 p)	Stubbekøbing BK
Glostrup IF 32	0–2	Lyngby BK
Jerne IF	1–0	Viborg FF
Kastrup BK	3–0	Halskov Fodbold
Nyborg G&IF	0–3	AIK Frederiksholm
BK Skjold Østerbro	0–2	Helsingør IF
Skovshoved IF	2–4	Ølstykke FC
Sorø IF Freja	3–1	Jyderup BK
Suså IF	1–2 (a.e.t.)	Tårnby BK
Thisted FC	4–6 (a.e.t.)	Frederikshavn fI
Tved BK	4–1	Vojens BK
Østerbros Boldklub	3–1	Eskilstrup BK
Aabyhøj IF	1–3	IF AIA-Tranbjerg

== Second round ==
Team 1	Score	Team 2
B 1913	3–0	IF Fuglebakken
B 1921	3–5	B.93
Brøndby IF	3–0	Brønshøj BK
Dalum IF	0–3 (a.e.t.)	Horsens fS
Esbjerg fB	4–2	FC Skanderborg
Frederikshavn fI	6–0	Tarp BK
AIK Frederiksholm	0–2	Ikast FS
Fremad Amager	1–2	Slagelse B&I
Hellas BK Valby	2–1 (a.e.t.)	Ølstykke FC
Herfølge BK	4–3	Holbæk B&I
Herning Fremad	2–0	Svendborg fB
Jerne IF	1–2	IF AIA-Tranbjerg
Kolding KFUM	0–5	B 1909
Lyngby BK	2–1	BK Dalgas
Silkeborg IF	5–4	Aabenraa BK
Stubbekøbing BK	1–5	Helsingør IF
Tårnby BK	2–1	Tved BK
Vanløse IF	4–1	Sorø IF Freja
Vejen SF	0–2	Odense BK
Østerbros Boldklub	1–4	Kastrup BK

== Third round ==
Team 1	Score	Team 2
AB	3–4	AaB
AGF	1–3	Vanløse IF
IF AIA-Tranbjerg	3–1	Brøndby IF
B 1901	0–2	B.93
B 1903	3–4	Ikast FS
B 1913	1–1 (a.e.t.) (3–5 p)	Silkeborg IF
Frederikshavn fI	2–0	Lyngby BK
Helsingør IF	4–0	Hellas BK Valby
Herfølge BK	1–2 (a.e.t.)	Odense BK
Herning Fremad	0–5	BK Frem
Horsens fS	3–2	Slagelse B&I
Kastrup BK	2–4	Hvidovre IF
KB	3–1	Tårnby BK
Næstved IF	1–1 (a.e.t.) (3–4 p)	Køge BK
Randers Freja	0–2	B 1909
Vejle BK	2–1	Esbjerg fB

== Fourth round ==
Team 1	Score	Team 2
B 1909	4–1	B.93
BK Frem	3–5	Hvidovre IF
Helsingør IF	1–2	Silkeborg IF
Horsens fS	0–2	Odense BK
Ikast FS	2–4	Vanløse IF
KB	4–1	IF AIA-Tranbjerg
Køge BK	2–2 (a.e.t.) (3–5 p)	AaB
Vejle BK	4–3	Frederikshavn fI

== Quarter-finals ==
Team 1	Score	Team 2
B 1909	2–2 (a.e.t.) (4–5 p)	Vanløse IF
Odense BK	2–0	Vejle BK
Silkeborg IF	1–4	KB
AaB	1–0	Hvidovre IF

== Semi-finals ==
Team 1	Score	Team 2
Vanløse IF	0–0 (a.e.t.)	KB
AaB	0–4	Odense BK

=== Replay ===
Team 1	Score	Team 2
KB	1–2	Vanløse IF

== Final ==
23 May 1974

Vanløse IF	5–2	Odense BK
Mauritzen 20'; Pettersson 57'; Kristiansen 60'; Rossander 80', 86'	Report	Olsen 43'; Kristensen 47'

Københavns Idrætspark, Copenhagen
Attendance: 20,000
Referee: Edgar H. Pedersen
