= 1927–28 FBUs Mesterskabsrække =

FBUs Mesterskabsrække
- Season: 1927–28
- Dates: 2 October 1927 – 29 April 1928 (regular season); 13 May 1928 (relegation play-offs)
- Champions: B 1913 (3rd title)
- Relegated: none
- Matches: 30
- Goals: 163 (5.43 per match)
- Biggest home win: B 1913 9–1 BK Marienlyst (25 March 1928)
- Biggest away win: Nyborg G&IF 0–7 Odense BK (16 October 1927)
- Highest scoring: B 1909 8–6 BK Marienlyst (23 October 1927)
- Total number of matches and goals played does not include the promotion/relegation play-off match.

The 1927–28 FBUs Mesterskabsrække was the 24th season of the Funen Football Championship since its establishment in 1904 under the administration of Fyns Boldspil-Union (FBU), and the 2nd season since the league was renamed to the FBUs Mesterskabsrække. The launch of the season began on 2 October 1927 and the final round of regular league fixtures were played on 29 April 1928 with the play-off promotion/relegation match being held on 13 May 1928. B 1909 were the defending league champions from the 1926–27 season. The league ran simultaneously with the inaugural edition of the 1927–28 Danmarksmesterskabsturneringen i Fodbold, in which three the league's best placed teams from the previous season participated. The three highest ranking teams in the final standings would automatically qualify for the 1928–29 Danmarksmesterskabsturneringen i Fodbold. All eligible teams in the FBUs Mesterskabsrække including the top placed teams of the 1927–28 FBUs A-række would also participate in the next season of the Funen regional cup tournament, 1928 FBUs Pokalturnering. After the end of the season, the league winner would take part in the 1928 Provinsmesterskabsturneringen.

The winner of the league were B 1913, who secured their third FBU top-flight title. During the fall season, B 1913 also secured their third consecutive regional cup title by defeating B 1909 in the 1927 FBUs Pokalturnering final. For the second season in a row, BK Marienlyst finished last in the Funen FA's primary football league, and they would therefore be scheduled to play a promotion/relegation play-off match against the winner of the 1927–28 FBUs A-række, the reserve team of B 1909. This season the team managed to lose all 10 league matches, but they won their relegation/promotion play-off match, securing their spot in the next season of FBUs Mesterskabsrække. BK Marienlyst would not have been relegated to FBUs A-række regardless of the result of the play-off match, because the winner of the tier 2 league was a reserve team, that was ineligible for promotion to FBUs Mesterskabsrække the following season, where the club's best senior team was playing.

== Season summary ==
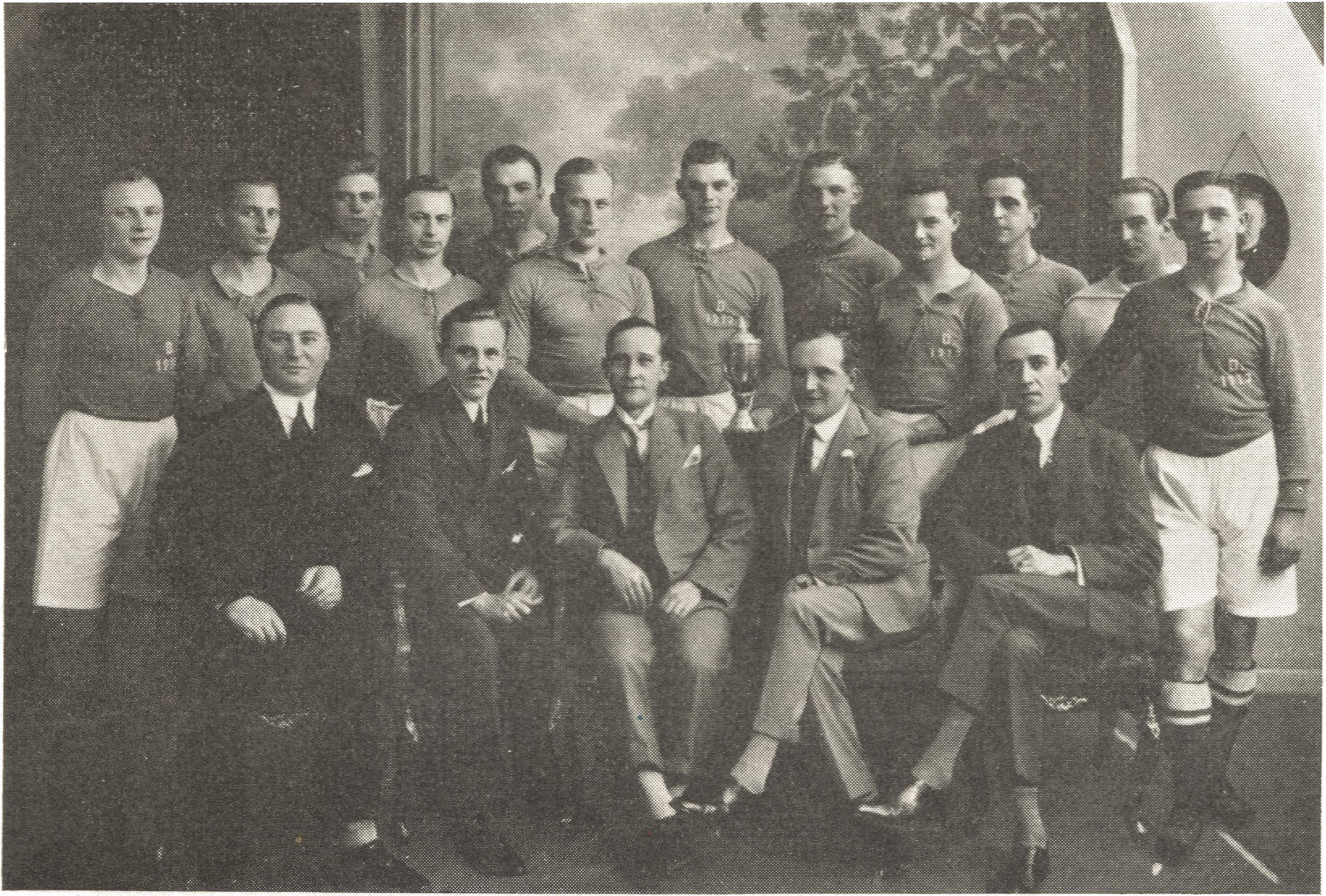
Regular team line-up of B 1913, the winners of the 1927/28-season of FBUs Mesterskabsrække, and the board members of 1928. Back row (standing from left to right): Martin Petersen, Knud Lindegaard, Harry Christensen, Poul Espe, Richard Rasmussen, Albert Fischer, Børge Jensen, Carl Hansen (nicknamed Flade Carl), Chr. Larsen, Johs. Bundegaard (reserve player), Frederik Johansen, Kaj Seebach. Front row (sitting from left to right): L.M. Fischer (vice chairman), Ejnar Hansen (treasurer), Th. Frederiksen (chairman), Alex Petersen, Steffen Henriksen.

The defending league champions from the previous season, B 1909, launched their season with a walkover game against the team, that finished last in the prior season's league standings, Nyborg G&IF. The East Fynian football club were not able to field an entire senior team in their first league away in Odense, and hence B 1909 was awarded a two points victory by the Funen FA with the goalless score of 0–0. At the end of the fall season of 1927, Odense BK were leading the table with 9 points following by B 1913 with 8 points and B 1909 with 6 points, while Nyborg G&IF at that point in time had gathered 4 points, Svendborg BK 3 points and BK Marienlyst 0 points. During the winter break the Nyborg-based team got several new developing players on to their first team.

In the spring season af 1928, B 1909 was left behind early in the run for the league championship, which ended up being fought between the two other Odense teams, B 1913 and Odense BK. In one of the decisive league matches in the last part of the season, B 1913 played against Odense BK on 22 April 1928. The referee of the game, Remtoft from Copenhagen, did not get on good terms with the 1,800 spectators, was criticised for the handling of the game, and both the players and the spectators in different ways contributed to a bad atmosphere during the match. After the referee dismissed one player, the commotion culminated with the referee expulsing a second player in the second half, Odense BK's best player during the match Otto Eriksen, from the game. This resulted in B 1913 scoring an additional two goals in the second half, securing a 3–0 victory, and gaining a one-point lead in the league standings just ahead of Odense BK.

B 1913 almost jeopardised the championship lead, when playing in Svendborg against Svendborg BK on 29 April 1928. Svendborg BK was leading their home match, 2–0, in the first half, before B 1909 scored three goals with a determined final sprint in the second half, securing a 3–2 win and hence the Funen League Championship title. Had Svendborg BK won the match, Odense BK would have obtained the league championship, while a tie would have meant that a replay match would be played to decide the championship between Odense BK and B 1913. Although the old tournament, Landsfodboldturneringen, had been dissolved last season, the provincial championship tournament was continued, and as the winner of the league, B 1913 qualified for the 1928 Provinsmesterskabsturneringen played after the ordinary league season. BK Marienlyst did not obtain any points during the season by losing all their league matches, but won their very last game of the season, which was an insignificant promotion/relegation play-off match against winner of the 1927–28 FBUs A-række, the reserve team of B 1909, who was eligible for promotion that season.

== League table ==
A total of six teams were contesting the league, all 6 sides from the 1926–27 season. Every team played two games against each other team, one at home and one away. Teams received two points for a win and one point for a draw. If two or more teams were tied on points, places were determined by goal average unless this concerned the Funen Championship, qualification for the national championship tournament or qualification for promotion/relegation play-offs, in which case replay matches would be scheduled. The team with the most points were crowned champions, while the team with the fewest points would enter a promotion/relegation play-off.

Pos	Team	Pld	W	D	L	GF	GA	GR	Pts	Promotion, qualification or relegation
1	B 1913 (C)	10	9	0	1	48	17	2.824	18	Qualification for the 1928 Provinsmesterskabsturneringen, semi-finals & 1928–29 Danmarksmesterskabsturneringen
2	Odense BK	10	8	1	1	41	17	2.412	17	Qualification for the 1928–29 Danmarksmesterskabsturneringen
3	B 1909	10	5	1	4	25	21	1.190	11 (Note: The match between B 1909 and Nyborg G&IF was originally scheduled to take place on 2 October 1927 at B 1909's home ground, but the away team Nyborg G&IF could not field a whole team of players and the game was therefore not played (w/o). Fyns Boldspil-Union (FBU) awarded Boldklubben 1909 the game as a 2 points victory with the score 0–0!)	Qualification for the 1928–29 Danmarksmesterskabsturneringen
4	Svendborg BK	10	3	2	5	22	26	0.846	8	
5	Nyborg G&IF	10	3	0	7	13	37	0.351	6	
6	BK Marienlyst (O)	10	0	0	10	14	45	0.311	0	Qualification to the Promotion/relegation play-offs

Updated to match(es) played on 29 August 2017. Source:
Rules for classification: 1) Points
(C) Champions; (O) Play-off winners

== Results table ==
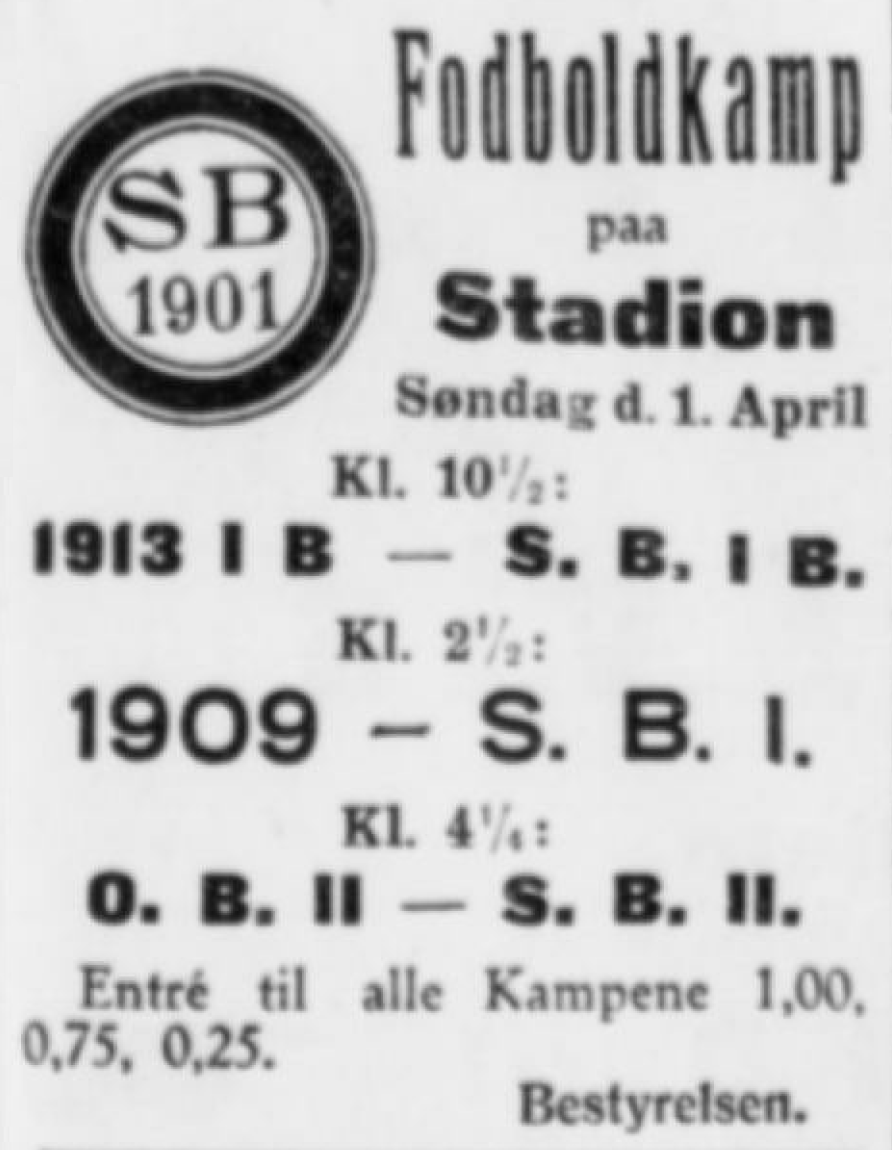
Newspaper advertisement for the league match between Svendborg BK and B 1909 on 1 April 1928.

Home \ Away	B09	B13	BKM	NGI	OBK	SBK
B 1909	—	1–2	8–6	0–0 (Note: The match between B 1909 and Nyborg G&IF was originally scheduled to take place on 2 October 1927 at B 1909's home ground, but the away team Nyborg G&IF could not field a whole team of players and the game was therefore not played (w/o). Fyns Boldspil-Union (FBU) awarded Boldklubben 1909 the game as a 2 points victory with the score 0–0.)	2–3	1–0
B 1913	3–2	—	9–1	5–2	3–0	5–1
BK Marienlyst	1–3	3–8	—	1–2	0–4	0–1
Nyborg G&IF	0–4	2–8	1–0	—	0–7	5–2
Odense BK	4–2	3–2	6–1	5–1	—	7–4
Svendborg BK	2–2	2–3	3–1	5–0	2–2	—

Updated to match(es) played on 29 August 2017. Source:
Legend: Blue = home team win; Yellow = draw; Red = away team win.
For upcoming matches, an "a" indicates there is an article about the rivalry between the two participants.

== Season statistics ==
=== Top scorers ===
B 1909's top scorer in the league became Creutz Jensen with 11 goals followed by Hans Pedersen with 5 goals.

Rank	Player	Club	Goals
—	(Denmark) Creutz Jensen	B 1909	11
—	(Denmark) Hans Pedersen	B 1909	5

=== Hat-tricks ===
Player	For	Against	Result	Date	Ref
(Denmark) Elsøe Jensen^{6}	Odense BK	Nyborg G&IF	7–0 (A)	16 October 1927	
(Denmark) Creutz Jensen^{4}	B 1909	BK Marienlyst	8–6 (H)	23 October 1927	
(Denmark) Børge Jensen^{5}	Odense BK	Svendborg BK	7–4 (H)	25 March 1928	
(Denmark) August "Tisten" Pedersen	B 1913	Nyborg G&IF	5–2 (H)	1 April 1928	

- ^{4} Player scored 4 goals
- ^{5} Player scored 5 goals
- ^{6} Player scored 6 goals

== Promotion/relegation play-offs ==
BK Marienlyst, who at this point in their history were located at Skibhusvej, finished last in the league and was scheduled to participate in the promotion/relegation play-off at Odense Boldklubs football field at Munke Mose in Odense against the winner of the 1927–28 FBUs A-række, the reserve team of B 1909, for a spot in the next season of the FBUs Mesterskabsrække. The Sunday match did not gather overwhelmingly great support and the excitement surrounding the play-off match was lacking; regardless of the final result, BK Marienlyst would not be relegated, because B 1909's reserve team could not be promoted to the premier division under Funen FA. BK Marienlyst won the play-off match. Both clubs remained in their respective tiers for the 1928/29–season regardless of the result.

The BK Marienlyst team was played in white shirts and red shorts, while the B 1909 reserves were playing in red shirts and white shorts. Although the match victory to BK Marienlyst was narrow, it was not a proper reflection of the strength of the two teams during the match. BK Marienlyst was dominant throughout the match with several goal opportunities, and the victory would have been larger, if the team had not taken it easy after increasing their lead to 4–2 in the second period - having finished the first half with the score 2–1. The physical aspect was more prominent than the technical aspect during the game. The B 1909's reserves utilized the relaxed play after BK Marienlyst's last goal to score an additional goal by having an elevated pressure against the Marienlyst goal post in the last minutes of the match.

13 May 1928
13:30 CEST

BK Marienlyst	4 – 3	B 1909 (reserves)
n/a n/a'; n/a n/a'; n/a n/a'; n/a n/a'		Holger Christensen n/a'; n/a n/a'; n/a n/a'

OB's Bane at Munke Mose, Odense

BK Marienlyst	B 1909 (reserves)

GK
DF
DF
MF
MF
MF
FW	Robert Petersen
FW	Weiglin
FW	Ejler Ditlevsen
FW
FW

GK
DF
DF
MF
MF
MF
FW	Hans Pedersen
FW	Holger Christensen
FW
FW
FW
