= 1926–27 FBUs Mesterskabsrække =

FBUs Mesterskabsrække
- Season: 1926–27
- Dates: 26 September 1926 – April 1927 (regular season); 1 – 8 May 1927 (play-offs)
- Champions: B 1909 (4th title)
- Relegated: none
- Matches played: 30
- Goals scored: 154 (5.13 per match)
- Total number of matches and goals played does not include the promotion/relegation play-offs, championship replays nor relegation replays.

The 1926–27 FBUs Mesterskabsrække was the 23rd season of the Funen Football Championship since its establishment in 1904 under the administration of Fyns Boldspil-Union (FBU). This was the first season played under the new name, Mesterskabsrækken, after the top-flight Funen league had previously been named A-rækken, a name that was passed on to the Funen second tier league. The launch of the season began on 26 September 1926 with three matches and the final round of regular league fixtures were played in April 1927 with the play-off matches being held on 1–8 May 1927. Svendborg BK were the defending league champions. The winner of the league would automatically qualify for the semifinals of the Provincial championship tournament that was held as part of the 1926–27 Landsfodboldturneringen that was played at the end of the regular season. The three highest ranking teams in the final standings participated in the inaugural season of the new Danish Championship play-off structure, the 1927–28 Danmarksmesterskabsturneringen i Fodbold. All eligible teams in the FBUs Mesterskabsrække including the best teams of the 1926–27 FBUs A-række would also participate in the next season of the Funen regional cup tournament, 1927 FBUs Pokalturnering.

The winner of the league were B 1909, who secured their fourth FBU top-flight title, after two championship replay matches was played against B 1913, as a consequence of both teams finishing level on points at the top of the table. During the fall season, B 1913 secured the regional cup title by defeating Odense BK in the 1926 FBUs Pokalturnering finale. Both, the newly promoted team, BK Marienlyst and Nyborg G&IF also finished level on points and last in the Funen FA's primary football league and an additional match had to scheduled to find the team that would participate in the promotion/relegation play-off match against the winner of the 1926–27 FBUs A-række, Middelfart G&IK. Even though losing the replay match, Nyborg G&IF managed to win the promotion/relegation play-off match, securing their spot in the next season of FBUs Mesterskabsrække.

== Season summary ==
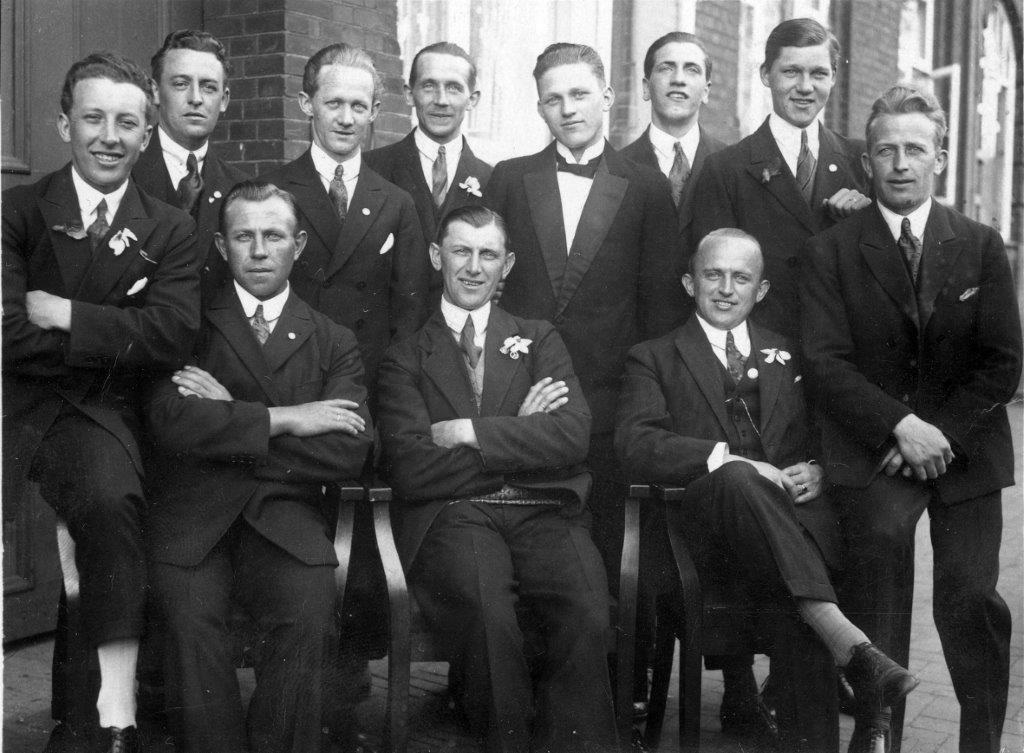
Team photo of B 1909, the winners of the 1926/27-season of FBUs Mesterskabsrække. Back row (standing left to right): Knud Michelsen, Hans Petersen (nicknamed "Hanse"), Hubert Møller, Aage Larsen, Creutz Jensen, Edmund Christensen (reserve player; nicknamed "Lunte"). Front row (sitting left to right): Aksel Petersen, Jens Nielsen, Emil Sundahl, Emil Petersen (nicknamed "Tip Top"), Carl Johan Johansen. Missing from the regular line-up is Aage Hansen.

The season was officially launched on 26 September 1926 with three league matches featuring B 1913 versus Odense BK at B 1913's home ground in Odense, newly promoted BK Marienlyst versus the defending regional league champions Svendborg BK at BM's home ground and Nyborg G&IF versus B 1909 at NG&IF's home ground at Nyborg. Along with the Funen league's name change from A-rækken to Mesterskabsrækken, a completely new tournament schedule and several laws were implemented. The remaining regional Funen leagues would begin playing their first rounds the following Sunday, while the regional top flight league would have a match-free weekend. The first goal of the season being scored by B 1913's forward Carl Hansen after five minutes of play in front of a crowd of 5–600 spectators, with B 1913 eventually winning the game 4–2 against Odense BK. The match between B 1913 and Odense BK was a repetition of the 1926 edition's final of FBUs Pokalturnering that had been played three weeks prior to the first match day, which had also been won by B 1913. Newly promoted BK Marienlyst secured their place in the league this season by winning the promotion/relegation play-off match against Dalum BK.

On 10 April 1927, B 1909 won their match against the other league title contender B 1913, securing an advantage on points before the last round. In the season's last round of league fixtures on 24 April 1927, both the league championship (and hence participation in the 1926–27 Landsfodboldturneringen) and the relegation play-off spot, including participation in the 1927–28 Danmarksmesterskabsturneringen was yet undetermined — two teams were competing for the Funen Championship, while the four lowest teams were in proximity (2 points between all clubs) of the relegation play-off match against the winner of the 1926–27 FBUs A-række. Svendborg BK]played in Svendborg against the league championship contender B 1909 and drew the match to a 4–4 tie, Odense BK won their match 6–1 on their own home field, Munke Mose in Odense, against BK Marienlyst, and Nyborg G&IF lost their home match in Nyborg against the other league championship contender B 1909 with the score 0–5. These results meant that the top two clubs (B 1909 and B 1913) and the two bottom teams (BK Marienlyst and Nyborg G&IF) in the league were now equal on points and additional matches had to be scheduled to determine their final positions the league table.

== Teams ==
=== Stadia and locations ===
Club	Location	Stadium
B 1909	Odense	B 1909's Bane i Østergade
B 1913	Odense	B 1913's Bane bag Assistens Kirkegård
BK Marienlyst	Odense	BM's Bane ved Skibhusvej
Nyborg G&IF	Nyborg	Nyborg Idrætspark
Odense BK	Odense	OB's Bane i Munke Mose
Svendborg BK	Svendborg	

== League table ==
A total of six teams were contesting the league, including 5 sides from the 1925–26 season and one team, BK Marienlyst, promoted from the 1925–26 FBUs B-række. Every team played two games against each other team, one at home and one away. Teams received two points for a win and one point for a draw. If two or more teams were tied on points, places were determined by goal average unless this concerned the Funen Championship, national championship or qualification for promotion/relegation play-offs, in which case replay matches were scheduled. The team with the most points were crowned champions, while the team with the fewest points would enter a promotion/relegation play-off.

Pos	Team	Pld	W	D	L	GF	GA	GR	Pts	Promotion, qualification or relegation
1	B 1909 (C)	10	5	3	2	29	18	1.611	13 (Note: B 1909 and B 1913 both finished level on points at the top of the final table. Two replay matches to determine the Funen Championship were played and the title was eventually awarded to B 1909.)	Qualification for the 1926–27 Landsfodboldturneringen, Provin. semi-finals & 1927–28 Danmarksmesterskabsturneringen
2	B 1913	10	6	1	3	31	18	1.722	13	Qualification for the 1927–28 Danmarksmesterskabsturneringen
3	Odense BK	10	5	1	4	26	21	1.238	11	Qualification for the 1927–28 Danmarksmesterskabsturneringen
4	Svendborg BK	10	3	3	4	24	27	0.889	9	
5	BK Marienlyst	10	3	1	6	20	36	0.556	7 (Note: BK Marienlyst and Nyborg G&IF both finished level on points at the bottom of the final table. An additional match was played to determine who would participate in the promotion/relegation play-offs.)	
6	Nyborg G&IF (O)	10	2	3	5	24	34	0.706	7	Qualification to the Promotion/relegation play-offs

Rules for classification: 1) Points
(C) Champions; (O) Play-off winners

== Results ==
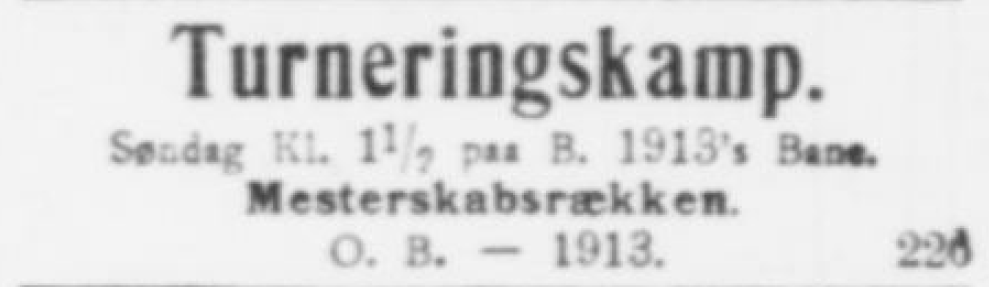
Newspaper advertisement for the league match between B 1913 and Odense BK on 26 September 1926.

Home \ Away	B09	B13	BKM	NGI	OBK	SBK
B 1909	—	4–1	4–1	5–1	1–0	1–2
B 1913	3–3	—			4–2	
BK Marienlyst	2–5		—			2–3
Nyborg G&IF	1–1	0–5	4–4	—		
Odense BK	3–1		6–1		—	4–1
Svendborg BK	4–4			4–4		—

Legend: Blue = home team win; Yellow = draw; Red = away team win.

== Season statistics ==
=== Top scorers ===
B 1909's top scorer in the league became Creutz Jensen with 13 goals followed by Emil Petersen with 6 goals.

Rank	Player	Club	Goals
—	(Denmark) Creutz Jensen	B 1909	13
—	(Denmark) Emil Petersen	B 1909	6

=== Hat-tricks ===
Player	For	Against	Result	Date	Ref
(Denmark) Creutz Jensen	B 1909	Nyborg G&IF	5–1 (H)	20 March 1927	
(Denmark) Creutz Jensen	B 1909	BK Marienlyst	5–2 (U)	27 March 1927	
(Denmark) Creutz Jensen^{4}	B 1909	B 1913	4–1 (H)	10 April 1927	

- ^{4} Player scored 4 goals

== Funen Championship replays ==
The two Odense-based clubs, B 1909 and B 1913, both finished level on points (13) at the top of the final standings. A replay match was scheduled at a neutral playing field, Munke Mose (OB's Bane; field owned by Odense BK), to determine the Funen League Championship, which ended in a 2–2 tie after the ordinary playing time (with the 1–1 in each half) and 3–3 tie after extra time (two times 15 minutes following a short break) with both goals scored in the first half of the extended time. In order to determine the championship during this match, an additional 15 minutes was played with an early implementation of the golden goal rule (g.e.t./g.g.) — the first team to score a goal wins the match — but no more goals were scored in this period. A second replay match was hence played, which was eventually won by B 1909, who were crowned Fynsmestre for the 1926/27-season. The final two matches of the Funen Championship saw an unprecedented number of spectators to a competitive match on Funen, with the close run of the replays attracting a new attendance record of around 3,000 spectators. The league matches in the original schedule between the two teams were attended by 1,000 and 1,100 spectators during the season. The second replay match was played on the same ground the following weekend, where B 1909 won 3–2, securing the championship (Fynsmesterskabet) and being crowned Fynsmestre (English: Funen Champions) after a 3–0 lead shortly into the second half of the game. There was a very similar team line-up for the two matches, where only the B 1909-player Jens Nielsen had been replaced by a substitute. There was speculation in the local newspaper, Fyens Stiftstidende, that a drawing of lots would be necessary to determine the championship, if the second replay match had also ended in a tie.

1 May 1927
13:30 CET
1st Replay

B 1909	3–3 (a.e.t./g.g.)	B 1913
Emil Petersen 31' (pen.); Carl Johan Johansen 53'; Hans Petersen 10?'		Albert Fischer 35'; Carl Hansen 59', 9?'

OB's Bane at Munke Mose, Odense
Attendance: 3,500
Referee: Valdemar Nilsson (Copenhagen)

B 1909	B 1913

GK	Aage Larsen
DF	Aage Hansen
DF	Jens Nielsen
MF	Emil Sundahl (c)
MF	Hubert Møller
MF	Carl Larsen
FW	Aksel Petersen
FW	Hans Petersen
FW	Creutz Jensen
FW	Emil Petersen
FW	Carl Johan Johansen

GK	Olaf "Laffe" Petersen
DF	Poul Espe
DF	Richard Rasmussen
MF	Ejner Jensen
MF	Børge Jensen
MF	Christian "Krølle" Larsen
FW	Martin "Malle" Petersen
FW	Albert Fischer
FW	Henry "Lodvig" Ludvigsen
FW	Carl Hansen
FW	Kaj Seebach

Match rules

- 90 minutes.
- 30 minutes of extra time if tied.
- 15 minutes of golden goal extra time.
- Replay match if scores level after extra time.

8 May 1927
13:30 CET
2nd Replay

B 1913	2–3	B 1909
Carl Hansen 67'; Henry "Lodvig" Ludvigsen 70'		Creutz Jensen 42', 47'; Carl Johan Johansen 44'

OB's Bane at Munke Mose, Odense
Attendance: 3,000
Referee: Valdemar Nilsson (Copenhagen)

B 1913	B 1909

GK	Olaf "Laffe" Petersen
DF	Poul Espe
DF
MF	Christian "Krølle" Larsen
MF	Børge Jensen
MF	Martin "Malle" Petersen
FW
FW	Albert Fischer
FW	Henry "Lodvig" Ludvigsen
FW	Carl Hansen
FW	Kaj Seebach

GK	Aage Larsen
DF	Aage Hansen
DF	Edmund Christensen
MF	Emil Sundahl (c)
MF	Hubert Møller
MF	Carl Larsen
FW	Aksel Petersen
FW	Hans Petersen
FW	Creutz Jensen
FW	Emil Petersen
FW	Carl Johan Johansen

Match rules

- 90 minutes.
- 30 minutes of extra time if tied.

== Promotion/relegation play-offs ==
BK Marienlyst and Nyborg G&IF both finished level on points in the table and a qualification play-off match was scheduled to determine the team, that was going to finish last in the league standings, hence participating in the promotion/relegation play-off. Nyborg G&IF (NG&IF) lost the replay match 4–2, played just ahead of the championship replay-match on the same field, with the score 2–1 in each half, and therefore met the winners of the 1926–27 FBUs A-række, Middelfart G&IK (MG&IK), for a spot in the next season of the FBUs Mesterskabsrække. The promotion/relegation play-off match, also played on the same field after the championship replay game, between Nyborg G&IF and Middelfart G&IK was won by East Funen team and both clubs therefore remained in their respective tiers for the 1927/28–season. The majority of the spectators present at the Championship match, played earlier in the day, stayed to watch the first part of the promotion/relegation match, which was dominated by Nyborg G&IF.

1 May 1927
10:00 CET
Relegation play-off qualifier

Nyborg G&IF	2–4	BK Marienlyst
n/a 1st half'; Peter Knudsen 88'		O. Work 20'; n/a 1st half'; n/a 75'; n/a 77'

OB's Bane at Munke Mose, Odense
Referee: Laurits "Sorte" Jørgensen (Odense BK)

8 May 1927
15:15 CET
Promotion/relegation play-off

Nyborg G&IF	4–0	Middelfart G&IK
Peter Knudsen n/a'; Peter Knudsen n/a'; n/a n/a'; n/a n/a'

OB's Bane at Munke Mose, Odense
Attendance: 2,000
