= 1976–77 Danish Cup =

Tournament details
- Country: Denmark

Final positions
- Champions: Vejle BK
- Runners-up: B 1909

The 1976–77 Danish Cup was the 23rd season of the Danish Cup, the highest football competition in Denmark. The final was played on 19 May 1977.

== First round ==
Team 1	Score	Team 2
AB	1–1 (a.e.t.) (4–5 p)	Roskilde BK
B 1908	1–3	Glostrup IC
B 1913	3–2 (a.e.t.)	Aalborg Chang
Brønshøj BK	3–1 (a.e.t.)	Gørlev IF
Dragør BK	1–1 (a.e.t.) (10–9 p)	Nyborg G&IF
Feldborg-Haderup IF	3–3 (a.e.t.) (4–5 p)	Vorup Frederiksberg BK
Herfølge BK	1–0	Gentofte-Vangede IF
Herning Fremad	1–1 (a.e.t.) (4–3 p)	Galten FS
Hellerup IK	1–3	Nakskov BK
Holstebro BK	1–2	Ikast FS
Horne FS	5–0	AIK Frederiksholm
Hørsholm-Usserød IK	2–1	Frederiksberg BK
Knabstrup IF	3–1 (a.e.t.)	Husum BK
Langeskov IF	3–1	Odder IGF
Lumby IF	2–2 (a.e.t.) (6–5 p)	Esbjerg ØB
Middelfart G&BK	4–1	Hjørring IF
Nørre Alslev BK	1–4	Frederikssund IK
OKS	4–2 (a.e.t.)	Støvring IF
Rødby fB	2–1	Helsingør IF
Silkeborg IF	5–2 (a.e.t.)	Thisted FC
Store Merløse IF	8–2	Hundested IK
Stubbekøbing BK	5–0	Klemensker IF
Søby FC	1–3	Ulbølle Fodbold
Toksværd Olstrup Fodbold	7–2	Vigerslev BK
Ulbjerg IF	4–1	Jerne IF
Vedbæk BK	3–4	BK Rødovre
Vejen SF	2–3 (a.e.t.)	Horsens fS
Aabyhøj IF	2–0	Frederikshavn fI

== Second round ==
Team 1	Score	Team 2
B 1909	1–0	Lumby IF
B 1913	0–2	Odense BK
Dragør BK	0–2	B.93
Frederikssund IK	4–3 (a.e.t.)	Hvidovre IF
Horne FS	1–0	OKS
Hørsholm-Usserød IK	1–0	Lyngby BK
IF Hasle Fuglebakken	3–3 (a.e.t.) (5–4 p)	Herning Fremad
Ikast FS	3–0	Middelfart G&BK
Kastrup BK	1–0 (a.e.t.)	Glostrup IC
Knabstrup IF	1–3	Herfølge BK
Langeskov IF	1–3	Aabenraa BK
Roskilde BK	3–1	Brønshøj BK
Rødby fB	3–1 (a.e.t.)	BK Rødovre
Silkeborg IF	2–1	Aabyhøj IF
Slagelse B&I	3–2	Nakskov BK
Stubbekøbing BK	3–1	Fremad Amager
Toksværd Olstrup Fodbold	2–2 (a.e.t.) (4–1 p)	Store Merløse IF
Ulbølle Fodbold	1–2	Svendborg fB
Ulbjerg IF	0–1 (a.e.t.)	Horsens fS
Vorup Frederiksberg BK	1–0	AGF

== Third round ==
Team 1	Score	Team 2
B 1903	4–1	B.93
B 1909	3–0	Kjøbenhavns Boldklub
Esbjerg fB	4–0	Roskilde BK
Holbæk B&I	0–3	Køge BK
Horne FS	4–3	Stubbekøbing BK
Horsens fS	1–2	B 1901
Hørsholm-Usserød IK	0–1	Svendborg fB
Ikast FS	0–2	Vejle BK
Kastrup BK	1–3	Randers Freja
Næstved IF	2–3	Frederikssund IK
Rødby fB	0–4	Herfølge BK
Silkeborg IF	4–2	IF Hasle Fuglebakken
Slagelse B&I	0–1	Vanløse IF
Store Merløse IF	2–4 (a.e.t.)	Odense BK
Vorup Frederiksberg BK	1–2	AaB
Aabenraa BK	0–2	BK Frem

== Fourth round ==
Team 1	Score	Team 2
B 1909	4–2	Horne FS
Frederikssund IK	2–3	Vanløse IF
BK Frem	1–2	B 1901
Køge BK	4–3	B 1903
Odense BK	10–1	Silkeborg IF
Randers Freja	0–3	Svendborg fB
Vejle BK	2–1	Esbjerg fB
AaB	6–2	Herfølge BK

== Quarter-finals ==
Team 1	Score	Team 2
Odense BK	1–4	B 1909
Vanløse IF	3–0	Svendborg fB
Vejle BK	1–1 (a.e.t.) (3–1 p)	Køge BK
AaB	0–0 (a.e.t.) (4–1 p)	B 1901

== Semi-finals ==
Team 1	Score	Team 2
Vejle BK	3–2	Vanløse IF
AaB	2–4	B 1909

== Final ==
19 May 1977

Vejle BK	2–1	B 1909
Jacquet 61'; Nørregaard 84'	Report	Konradsen 62'

Københavns Idrætspark, Copenhagen
Attendance: 13,100
Referee: Torben Månsson
