= Funen Series =

Fynsserien for Herrer
- Founded: 1904; 122 years ago
- First season: 1904–05
- Country: Denmark
- Confederation: DBU Funen (DBU)
- Number of clubs: 16 (from 2014–15)
- Level on pyramid: 6 (from 2021–22)
- Promotion to: Denmark Series (3 divisions)
- Relegation to: Series 1, group 1 (south Funen); Series 1, group 2 (north Funen)
- Domestic cup(s): FBUs Pokalturnering (1920–1953); Danish Cup (1954–present)
- Current champions: OKS (4th title) (2018–19)
- Most championships: Odense Boldklub (18 titles)
- Broadcaster(s): TV 2/Fyn (2008–2009)
- Current: 2024–25 season

Funen Series for men (Danish: Fynsserien for Herrer; Herre Fynsserien), also known as Albani Series for men (Danish: Albaniserien for Herrer) for sponsorship reasons, and often shortened to FS serien and FS Herre, is the highest division for men organised by the regional football association DBU Fyn (DBUF) and one of the fifth-highest divisions overall in the Danish football league system. The league, deciding the Funen Football Championship (Danish: FM for seniorer; Fynsmesterskabet), was first introduced with the 1904–05 season and throughout the years the competition format have gone through several series of changes. At the time of the league's introduction, it was placed at the top of the Danish football league system featuring the best regional amateur teams of Funen, but has since been moved to its current status as the fifth best level in Danish football, after a short period as the sixth best level, now featuring lower ranking amateur teams including the reserve squads of clubs playing at the Danish third league tier or above.

The division has changed its name on numerous occasions. It has previously been known as Førsteholdsrækken (1904/05–1913/14), A-rækken (1914/15–1925/26; or FBUs A-række, Række A) and Mesterskabsrækken (1926/27–1944/45; or FBUs Mesterrække to distinguish it from the other regional leagues; unofficially shortened to Mesterrækken), before settling with the current name of Fynsserien in 1945, eventually becoming Fynsserien for Herrer to distinguish it to the women's corresponding regional league, that was introduced in the 1970s. Ahead of the 2008/09-season, the Albani Brewery (since 2000 known as Royal Unibrew) obtained the naming rights for the highest men's and women's leagues under the auspices of DBU Funen, and both leagues have since respectively been known as Albaniserien for Herrer and Albaniserien for Kvinder.

== History ==
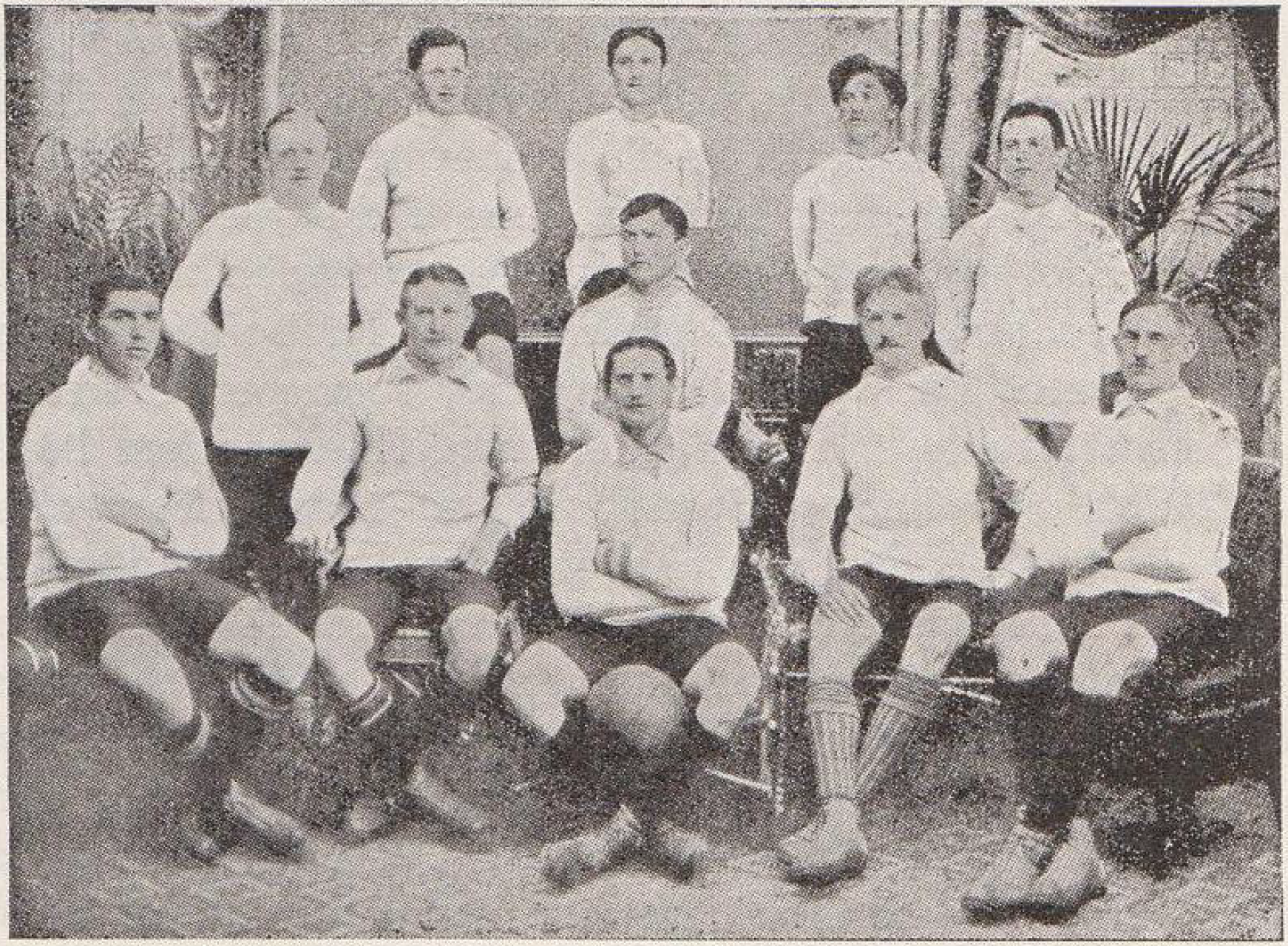
Group photo of the BK Union, Svendborg players, who secured the 1909–10 FBUs Førsteholdsrække league championship.

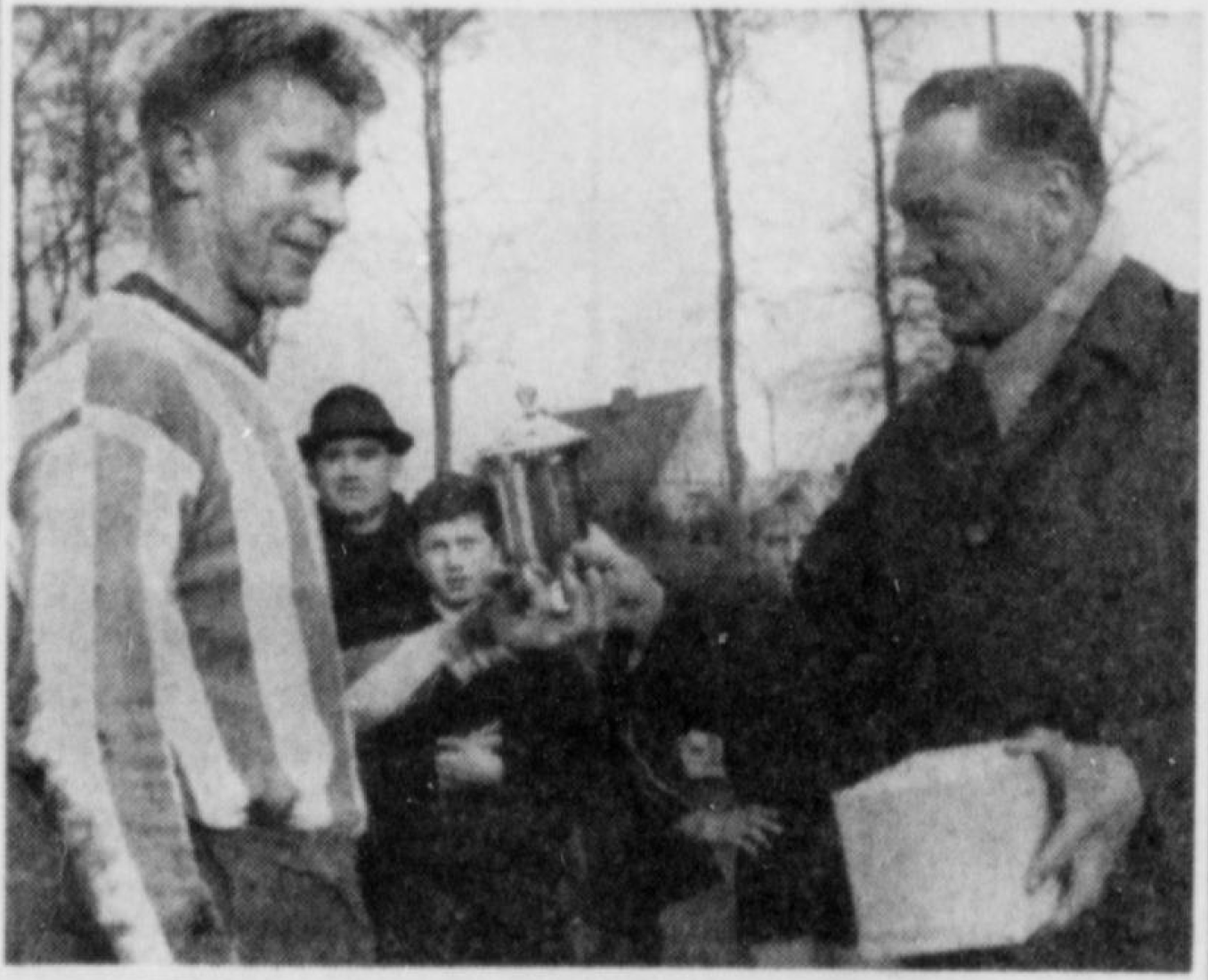
Odense BK reserves' captain Svend Madsen (left) receiving the trophy for winning the 1963 Funen Series, referred to as the "FBU-pokalen", from Funen FA's representative C. A. Kofoed (right) following the final league match against Svendborg fB reserves at Høje Bøge Stadium on 17 November 1963.

In the first couple of seasons, the Funen League Championship had to be won three times in a row, or four times in total, in order for a club to obtain the permanent ownership of the championship trophy, which otherwise would only be held by the reigning championship club for a year. The first trophy, made of silver and valued at 200 kr., was financed by the newly founded regional association (at this time named Fyens Bold Union), granted to Odense Boldklub in 1907 after winning the first three editions of the football championship. The second trophy, financed by the Danish FA, was reportedly also handed over to Odense BK after obtaining their fourth league title in 1916.

Between 1913 and 1931, the Funen championship clubs qualified for the provincial football championship, Provins-Fodboldturneringen, and until 1927 thereby the Danish national football championship, Landsfodboldturneringen. A-rækken was established by Funen FA in 1914 as a continuation of the Førsteholdsrækken. The league tournament under the auspices of the Funen Football Association changed its name from A-rækken to Mesterskabsrækken in 1926, beginning with the 1926/27-season, which also includes a new tournament schedule with several new laws.

In May/June 2008, starting with the upcoming 2008/09-season, Fyns Boldspil-Union (FBU) signed a marketing agreement with the local company Albani Brewery (who became Royal Unibrew in 2000), that involved promoting the highest amateur leagues for both men and women under the auspices of the regional football association – an agreement that have been continuously renewed in subsequent years. The agreement effectively changed the name of men's league to 'Albaniserien for Herrer' and also involved the winners of both the men's and women's leagues receiving cash prizes – the two winners of the 2010/11-season received DKK 10,000. At the same time, cooperations was established with the two regional newspapers, Fyns Amts Avis and Fyens Stiftstidende, to publish extended pre-season startup appendixes in addition to the normal newspaper layout, and with the regional television station TV 2/Fyn to bring weekly match highlights and interviews from a selected match, chosen by DBU Funen, in a given league round besides focusing on a specific theme, such as fair play, inspiration for managers, fan cultures and the referee's work and function, during the entire TV report and including local football celebrities. The initiative behind this project of promoting the league came to life by the chairman of Sanderum Boldklub, Jan Nanfeldt, and was made in the wake of a large dropout rate in the youth ranks and in the hopes of making it more attractive to play and watch association football in the lower ranking leagues. The weekly coverage project by the television station was discontinued before the beginning of the 2009 spring season.

Funen Series sponsor logo:

Albaniserien for Herrer
(2008/09–present)
Albani/Royal Unibrew

== Funen Championship winners ==
The winner in a given season wins the Funen Football Championship (with the official title of Fynsmestre) and is automatically promoted to the Denmark Series. The runner-up enters a home/away promotion playoff against teams from the highest leagues of the other regional associations for the right to enter the Denmark Series. Teams placing in the bottom are automatically relegated to either the Series 1, group 1 (featuring teams from the south of Funen) or Series 1, group 2 (featuring teams from the north of Funen). Depending on the number of teams, that are members of FBU Funen, relegated from Denmark Series, the number of teams relegated to Series 1 will be either increased or decreased.

=== Førsteholdsrækken (1904–1914) ===
| Season | Level | Date | Winners | Score | Runners–up | Venue | Ref |
|---|---|---|---|---|---|---|---|
| 1904–05 | 1 (Note: Between 1904 and 1912, there was no national championship playoff and the regional championships, were the highest level, that the clubs could reach, so in principle level 1. The Funen League Tournament co-existed with parallel regional leagues and divisions administrated by the regional associations under the Danish Football Association.) | 8 January 1905 | Odense BK | 5–5 | BK Frem | OB's Bane at Munke Mose, Odense | |
| 1904–05 | 1 | 15 January 1905 | Odense BK | annul. (Note: The first re-match in the 1904/05-season final was annulled by Fyens Bold Union (FBU) after BK Frem won a complaint, and a new re-match was hence scheduled. The first rematch had originally ended with Odense Boldklub (OB) winning 3–1 over BK Frem.) | BK Frem | —N/a | |
| 1904–05 | 1 | 26 March 1905 | Odense BK | 3–2 | BK Frem | OB's Bane at Munke Mose, Odense | |
| 1905–06 | 1 | —N/a | Odense BK | —N/a | unclear (Note: The sources does not specify the club that finished in the runner-up spot. Besides the winner, Odense Boldklub, the other participants this season were Assens Gymnastik- og Idrætsklub, Kerteminde Boldklub and Skaarup Seminarium Fodboldklub.) | —N/a | |
| 1906–07 | 1 | 2 December 1906 | Odense BK | 11–1 | BK Union | OB's Bane at Munke Mose, Odense | |
| 1907–08 | 1 | 1 December 1907 | Not awarded (Note: In the 1907/08-season the finale match for the Funen Football Championship ended in a tie, 5-5, between Odense Boldklub and Boldklubben Union. No re-match was scheduled and hence no champion was declared that year.) | | | OB's Bane at Munke Mose, Odense | |

| Season | Level | Champions | Runners-up | Ref |
|---|---|---|---|---|
| 1908–09 | 1 | Odense BK | BK Union | |

| Season | Level | Date | Winners | Score | Runners–up | Venue | Ref |
|---|---|---|---|---|---|---|---|
| 1909–10 | 1 | 8 May 1910 | BK Union (south) | 3–0 | Odense BK (north) | Viebæltet, Svendborg | |
| 1910–11 | 1 | 14 May 1911 | BK Union (south) | 5–1 | Odense BK (north) | OB's Bane at Munke Mose, Odense | |
| 1911–12 | 1 | — | Odense BK (Note: In the 1911/12-season, the finale for the Funen Football Championship was supposed to be played between the winners of the northern group, Odense Boldklub, and the winners of the southern group, Boldklubben Union. However, the match was never played, because Boldklubben Union did not show up to the match scheduled to take place, and Odense Boldklub was awarded the title without a match. The club disagreed with the decision from FBU, that the match should take place in Odense. Boldklubben Union did not hand over the challenge trophy, won in the previous season, to Odense BK until several months later, and was excluded from the football association for a year.) (north) | w/o | BK Union (south) | — | |
| 1912–13 | 1 (Note: Danish Football Association (DBU) introduced Landsfodboldturneringen beginning with the 1912/13-season, where the winners of each of the regional association meet in a play-off cup tournament at the end of the season to decide both the provincial and national championship. This play-off tournament lasted until the introduction of the Danmarksturneringen i fodbold in 1927.) | 1 May 1913 | Not awarded (Note: In the 1912/13-season, the finale for the Funen Football Championship was played between the winners of the northern group, Odense Boldklub, and the winners of the southern group, Boldklubben 1909. The first match played on 1 May 1913 (Feast of the Ascension) ended in a tie, 2-2, and a second match was scheduled to take place on 18 May 1913. The re-match was won 3-2 by Boldklubben 1909, but a couple of months later the club was eventually stripped of the title due to the use of an illegal player (Svend Petersen).) | | | OB's Bane at Munke Mose, Odense | |
| 1912–13 | 1 | 18 May 1913 | Not awarded | | | OB's Bane at Munke Mose, Odense | |
| 1913–14 | 1 | 17 May 1914 | BK Union (south) | 8–3 | Odense BK (north) | OB's Bane at Munke Mose, Odense | |

=== A-rækken (1914–1926) ===
| Season | Level | Champions | Runners-up | Ref |
|---|---|---|---|---|
| 1914–15 | 1 | Odense BK | BK Union | |
| 1915–16 | 1 | Odense BK (Note: In the 1915/16-season Odense Boldklub and Svendborg Boldklub both finished level on points (9 pts) in the final table. A re-match was played in Svendborg - in order to find the winner of the league - which ended in a 0-0 tie. A second match was played in Odense, which resulted in a 2-4 away win by Odense Boldklub.) | Svendborg BK | |
| 1916–17 | 1 | Odense BK | B 1909 | |
| 1917–18 | 1 | Odense BK (Note: In the 1917/18-season Odense Boldklub and Boldklubben 1909 both finished level on points (10 pts) in the final table. A re-match was played - in order to find the winner of the league - which ended in a 6-1 home victory by Odense Boldklub.) | B 1909 | |
| 1918–19 | 1 | Odense BK | B 1909 | |
| 1919–20 | 1 | B 1909 | Odense BK | |
| 1920–21 | 1 | B 1909 | Svendborg BK | |
| 1921–22 | 1 | B 1909 | Odense BK | |
| 1922–23 | 1 | B 1913 | B 1909 | |
| 1923–24 | 1 | B 1913 | B 1909 | |
| 1924–25 | 1 | Odense BK | B 1913 | |
| 1925–26 | 1 | Svendborg BK | B 1913 | |

=== Mesterskabsrækken (1926–1945) ===
| Season | Level | Champions | Runners-up | Ref |
|---|---|---|---|---|
| 1926–27 | 1 | B 1909 (Note: In the 1926/27-season Boldklubben 1909 and Boldklubben 1913 both finished level on points (13 pts) in the final table. A re-match was played, ending in a draw, 3-3 after extra time. A second match was played, which was won 3-2 by Boldklubben 1909.) | B 1913 | |
| 1927–28 | 2 (Note: In 1927, the Danmarksturneringen i fodbold replaced the Landsfodboldturneringen, introducing a single national league level composed of five districts and with a play-off tournament at the end of the season to decide both the provincial and national championship that specific season. Teams qualified for the national tournament based on their regional league results from the previous season.) | B 1913 | Odense BK | |
| 1928–29 | 2 | Odense BK | B 1909 | |
| 1929–30 | 3 (Note: After two years with a single national level divided into five districts, the "Danmarksturneringen i fodbold" was reorganized into two national leagues with a single round-robin schedule each located at different levels, one championship league (Mesterskabsserien) and one promotion league (Oprykningsserien), beginning with the 1929/30-season.) | B 1913 | B 1909 | |
| 1930–31 | 3 | B 1909 | Odense BK | |
| 1931–32 | 3 | B 1909 | Odense BK | |
| 1932–33 | 3 | B 1913 | B 1909 | |
| 1933–34 | 3 | B 1913 | B 1909 | |
| 1934–35 | 3 | B 1909 | BK Marienlyst | |
| 1935–36 | 3 | B 1913 | B 1909 | |
| 1936–37 | 4 (Note: The 1935/36-season of the Danmarksturneringen i fodbold consisted of two levels (with a total of three divisions) with each team playing in a single round-robin schedule and at the same time participating in the regional leagues. The 1936/37-season introduced a new third level in the Danmarksturneringen i fodbold (four divisions in total), where each division had a double round-robin schedule. The teams in the top two levels did not participate in the regional leagues, while the teams at the third levels still took part in the regional tournaments.) | Odense BK | Nyborg G&IF | |
| 1937–38 | 4 | BK Marienlyst | Svendborg BK | |
| 1938–39 | 4 | Odense KFUM | BK Marienlyst | |
| 1939–40 | 4 | BK Marienlyst | Odense BK | |
| 1940–41 | 2 (Note: During World War II, the Danish Football Association (DBU) suspended the then national league structure, consisting of three divisional series, with clubs being divided geographically in regional series using a flat horizontal structure, though eliminating two levels in the Danish football league system for the entire period (1940–1945). The regional champions qualified to play in one of the regional series.) | Odense BK (Note: In the 1940/41-season Odense Boldklub and Odense KFUM both finished level on points (22 pts) in the final table. A re-match was played - in order to find the winner of the league - which ended in a 3-0 win by Odense Boldklub.) | Odense KFUM | |
| 1941–42 | 2 | Odense KFUM | B 1909 (II) | |
| 1942–43 | 2 | Odense KFUM | B 1913 (II) | |
| 1943–44 | 2 | Odense KFUM (Note: In the 1943/44-season Odense KFUM and Svendborg Boldklub both finished level on points (25 pts) in the final table. A re-match was played - in order to find the winner of the league - which ended in a 0-3 away win by Odense KFUM.) | Svendborg BK | |
| 1944–45 | 2 | Not finished (Note: Mesterskabsrækken (SBU level 1) completed the scheduled matches in the autumn of 1944, but all football tournaments under Fyns Boldspil-Union were suspended in the spring of 1945 due to the travel restrictions set up in the spring of 1945 during World War II. A wartime crisis tournament was set up instead, where teams played in small (local) regional tournaments and all promotions and relegations were suspended. Boldklubben 1913 won the Odense regional championship tournament and Svendborg Boldklub won the Svendborg regional championship tournament.) | | |

=== Fynsserien (1945–) ===
| Season | Level | Champions | Runners-up | Ref |
|---|---|---|---|---|
| 1945–46 | 4 (Note: After World War II, the nation-wide tournament, "Danmarksturneringen i fodbold", were resumed with a 3 league-structure, which meant that all the regional championship leagues were lowered to tier 4 in the Danish football league system.) | Svendborg Boldklub | BK Marienlyst | |
| 1946–47 | 4 | Svendborg Boldklub | Boldklubben 1909 (II) | |
| 1947–48 | 4 | Svendborg Boldklub | Boldklubben 1909 (II) | |
| 1948–49 | 4 | Svendborg Boldklub | BK Marienlyst | |
| 1949–50 | 4 | Odense KFUM | Svendborg Boldklub | |
| 1950–51 | 4 | Odense KFUM | Odense Boldklub (II) | |
| 1951–52 | 4 | Boldklubben 1909 (II) | Odense Boldklub (II) | |
| 1952–53 | 4 | Boldklubben 1909 (II) | Nyborg G&IF | |
| 1953–54 | 4 | Svendborg Boldklub | Odense Boldklub (II) | |
| 1954–55 | 4 | Svendborg Boldklub | Odense Boldklub (II) | |
| 1955–56 | 4 | Boldklubben 1913 (II) | Boldklubben 1909 (II) | |
| 1956–57 | 4 | Odense KFUM | Boldklubben 1909 (II) | |
| 1958 | 4 | Boldklubben 1909 (II) | Nyborg G&IF | |
| 1959 | 5 (Note: Beginning with the 1959 edition, the 'Kvalifikationsturneringen' switched from being an end-of-the-season qualifying tournament for promotion to the 3rd Division, with participation of the best regional champions, to becoming a full season league and a part of league structure of "Danmarksturneringen i fodbold". With the introduction of the new league, nicknamed '4th Division', the Funen Series within the overall Danish football league system was dropped by one level.) | Middelfart G&BK | Boldklubben 1909 (II) | |
| 1960 | 5 | Odense Boldklub (II) | Boldklubben 1909 (II) | |
| 1961 | 5 | Boldklubben 1909 (II) | Odense Boldklub (II) | |
| 1962 | 5 | Boldklubben 1909 (II) | Boldklubben 1913 (II) | |
| 1963 | 5 | Odense Boldklub (II) | Boldklubben 1909 (II) | |
| 1964 | 5 | Boldklubben 1909 (II) | Aarup Boldklub | |
| 1965 | 5 | Assens G&IK | Nyborg G&IF | |
| 1966 | 5 | Ringe Boldklub | Hårslev Boldklub | |
| 1967 | 5 | Middelfart G&BK | Tved Boldklub | |
| 1968 | 5 | Søndersø Boldklub | Kerteminde Boldklub | |
| 1969 | 5 | Nørre Aaby IK | OKS | |
| 1970 | 5 | Svendborg fB (II) | Aarup Boldklub | |
| 1971 | 5 | Tved Boldklub | Dalum IF | |
| 1972 | 5 | Dalum IF | Fraugde G&IF | |
| 1973 | 5 | Skamby Boldklub | Kerteminde Boldklub | |
| 1974 | 5 | Odense Boldklub (III) | Boldklubben 1909 (II) | |
| 1975 | 5 | Odense Boldklub (III) | Svendborg fB (II) | |
| 1976 | 5 | OKS | Odense Boldklub (III) | |
| 1977 | 5 | Næsby Boldklub | Faaborg BK&IF | |
| 1978 | 5 | Svendborg fB (II) | Fjordager IF | |
| 1979 | 5 | BK Marienlyst | Boldklubben 1909 (II) | |
| 1980 | 5 | Skamby Boldklub | Boldklubben 1909 (II) | |
| 1981 | 5 | Boldklubben 1909 (II) | Glamsbjerg IF | |
| 1982 | 5 | Ullerslev BK | Glamsbjerg IF | |
| 1983 | 5 | Dalum IF | OKS (II) | |
| 1984 | 5 | Boldklubben 1913 (II) | Tarup-Paarup IF | |
| 1985 | 5 | Tarup-Paarup IF | Middelfart G&BK | |
| 1986 | 5 | Nørre Aaby IK | BK Marienlyst | |
| 1987 | 5 | Assens FC | Svendborg fB (II) | |
| 1988 | 5 | Nyborg G&IF | Næsby Boldklub | |
| 1989 | 5 | OKS (II) | Ullerslev BK | |
| 1990 | 5 | Middelfart G&BK | Fjordager IF | |
| 1991 | 5 (Note: In the summer of 1991, one of the several changes to the format of the Danmarksturneringen i fodbold, was the introduction of the Kvalifikationsligaen in the spring section of the season, which meant that the levels in the overall Danish football league system was dropped by one, while at the same time being increased by one in the autumn season. This tournament format lasted until the spring of 1995.) | Boldklubben 1913 (II) | OKS (II) | |
| 1992 | 6→5 | Korup IF | Svendborg fB (II) | |
| 1993 | 6→5 | Dalum IF | Aarslev Boldklub | |
| 1994 | 6→5 | Tarup-Paarup IF | Otterup B&IK | |
| 1995 | 6→5 | Tårup IF | Næsby Boldklub | |
| 1996 | 5 | Otterup B&IK | Assens FC | |
| 1997 | 5 | Tved Boldklub | Svendborg fB (II) | |
| 1998 | 6 (Note: The Kvalifikationsrækken were introduced in the spring of 1998 by the Danish Football Association as a buffer zone between the higher ranking level's autumn-spring season format and the lower ranking level's spring-autumn season formats. This meant, that the Funen Series within the overall Danish football league system was dropped by one level. The tournament was discontinued in the summer of 2008 and the level of the Funen Series was increased.) | Fjordager IF | Tarup-Paarup IF | |
| 1999 | 6 | Dalum IF (II) | OKS | |
| 2000 | 6 | Boldklubben 1913 (II) | BK Marienlyst | |
| 2001 | 6 | Otterup B&IK | Brændekilde-Bellinge Boldklub | |
| 2002 | 6 | Thurø Boldklub | Næsby Boldklub (II) | |
| 2003 | 6 | Boldklubben 1913 (II) | OKS | |
| 2004 | 6 | Aarup Boldklub | Middelfart G&BK | |
| 2005 | 6 | Næsby Boldklub (II) | BK Marienlyst | |
| 2006 | 6 | OKS | Boldklubben 1913 (FCF II) | |
| 2007 | 6 | BK Marienlyst | Sanderum Boldklub | |
| 2008 spring | 6 | Dalum IF (FCF IV) | Marstal IF/Rise S&IF | |
| 2008–09 | 5 | Fjordager IF | BK Marienlyst | |
| 2009–10 | 5 | Aarup Boldklub | Næsby Boldklub (II) | |
| 2010 fall | 5 | Korup IF | Søhus Stige Boldklub | |
| 2011 spring | 5 | Korup IF | Boldklubben 1909 (FCF III) | |
| 2011–12 | 5 | Marstal IF/Rise S&IF | Boldklubben 1909 (FCF II) | |
| 2012–13 | 5 | Boldklubben 1909 (FCF II) | Krarup/Espe SG&IF | |
| 2013–14 | 5 | Dalum IF | Boldklubben 1909 | |
| 2014–15 | 5 | Tarup-Paarup IF | Oure Fodbold Akademi | |
| 2015–16 | 5 | Boldklubben 1913 | SSV Højfyn | |
| 2016–17 | 5 | Boldklubben 1909 | Otterup B&IK | |
| 2017–18 | 5 | Otterup B&IK | OKS | —N/a |
| 2018–19 | 5 | OKS | Bogense G&IF | —N/a |
| 2019–20 | 5 | Boldklubben 1913 | Boldklubben 1909 (not promoted) | —N/a |
| 2020–21 | 5 | Boldklubben 1909 | Kerteminde Boldklub (not promoted) | —N/a |
