= Roald Poulsen =

Danish football manager (1950–2024)

Personal information
- Date of birth: 28 November 1950
- Place of birth: Odense, Denmark
- Date of death: 16 October 2024 (aged 73)

Managerial career
- Years: Team
- 1977–1982: OKS
- 1983–1987: B 1913
- 1988–1992: Odense Boldklub
- 1993–1994: Viborg FF
- 1994–1996: Zambia
- 1996–1998: Odense Boldklub
- 1998–1999: Al-Rayyan Sports Club
- 1999: Al-Arabi
- 2002: Zambia
- 2004–2005: Engen Santos
- 2005–2006: Dalum IF
- 2006: B 1913
- 2006–2007: FC Fyn
Medal record
Men's football
Representing Zambia (as manager)
Africa Cup of Nations
Bronze medal – third place	1996

Roald Poulsen (28 November 1950 – 16 October 2024) was a Danish football manager, who most prominently won the 1989 Danish championship with Odense BK and managed the Zambia national team.

== Career ==
Poulsen started his coaching career with amateur club OKS. From 1983 to 1987, he managed B 1913. From 1988 to 1992, Poulsen managed Odense BK, with whom he won the 1989 Danish championship and 1992 Danish Cup tournament. From 1993 to 1994, Poulsen managed Viborg FF. In 1994, Poulsen was named manager of the Zambia national team, which he managed until 1996. He returned to Odense BK in 1996, and brought with him Zambian internationals Mwape Miti and Andrew Tembo. In 1998, he moved to Qatar in order to manage Al-Rayyan Sports Club, staying at the club until 1999.

From 1999 to 2004 he led the FC Copenhagen Sports College in South Africa, only interrupted by a brief spell as national manager of Zambia in 2002. He coached South African club Engen Santos from 2004 to 2005. In 2005, Poulsen returned to Denmark to manage Dalum IF. He moved in B 1913 in 2006, before moving to FC Fyn later that year. He stayed at FC Fyn until December 2007.

In January 2009 he was named technical director of Cape United Soccer School of Excellence in Cape Town.

== Death ==
Poulsen died after a long illness on 16 October 2024, at the age of 73.
