= SfB-Oure FA =

Association football club in Svendborg, Denmark

- Full name: Svendborg forenede Boldklubber-Oure Fodbold Akademi
- Founded: 25 January 2018; 8 years ago
- Ground: Høje Bøge, Svendborg
- Capacity: 7,000
- Chairman: Jesper Jensen
- Manager: Thune Holm
- League: Denmark Series
- 2024–25: Denmark Series Group 3, 4th of 10; Promotion Group 2, 5th of 10
- Website: sfb.dk
| Home colours | Away colours |

SfB-Oure FA (Danish pronunciation: [ˈesefpe̝ˀˌoːɐˌefɛˀ]) is a Danish professional association football club based in the town of Svendborg, that competes in Denmark Series, the fifth tier of the Danish football league system. Founded in 2018 as an elite superstructure of Svendborg fB and Oure FA, it is affiliated to DBU Funen. The team plays its home matches at Høje Bøge Stadium where it has been based since its foundation.

The club has roots dating back to 1900 where the cricket club "Phoenix", which would since become Svendborg fB, was founded, while the first professional superstructure in the South Funen region was established in 2008 with FC Svendborg. In 2017, the professional department of SfB known as FC Svendborg was declared bankrupt. Six months later, however, an elite structure was established between Svendborg fB and Oure FA, the football department of Skolerne i Oure which is the largest boarding school environment in Denmark. The new club, named SfB-Oure FA took over the licence of Oure FA and was therefore placed in the Denmark Series, the fourth tier of Danish football. They reached promotion to the Danish 2nd Division, the third tier, in June 2020.

== History ==
=== Svendborg fB's ups and downs (1900–2004) ===
Founded on 25 January 2018, SfB-Oure FA is the superstructure of Oure Fodbold Akademi, a football academy which is part of Skolerne i Oure, the largest boarding school environment in Denmark, and Svendborg fB, which has a long-standing history as an association football club in the Danish football league system.

The main parent club of this merger, Svendborg fB has a history dating back to the dawn of the 20th century. In the spring of 1900, a group of young men decided to establish a cricket club, "Phoenix", which in 1901 was renamed "Union", its founding date set to 2 April 1901 to commemorate the centennial of the Battle of Copenhagen of 1801. Following the formation of the club, the side started to play association football as one of the first clubs in Svendborg, which gradually suppressed the interest in cricket. The Svendborg club joined DBU Funen (FBU) in 1906, two years after the foundation of the local football federation, which officially made football a part of the club. Their first match under the FBU, in which they wore a kit consisting of black shorts and red and white striped jerseys and had their home ground at Nyborgvej Stadium, resulted in a 5– 0 win over North Funen side Start Otterup from Otterup. In the summer of 1915, the club changed its name to Svendborg Boldklub (SB). By winning the local rounds organised by the local football federation, the Svendborg-based club managed to qualify as FBU's only representative to participate in the 1925–26 season of the Denmark Tournament, a Danish FA-organised club football tournament between the championship clubs from each of the six regional football associations. Here, Svendborg Boldklub only made one appearance, on 30 May 1926, a match which was played in Vejle during the second round of the tournament DBU Jutland (JBU)'s representative Horsens fS, which they lost 3–1.

In 1954, another Svendborg-side was founded, Kammeraternes Boldklub (KB), who became a direct competitor to Svendborg Boldklub, a rivalry emanating from the clubs' table tennis departments. KB was formed through a merger between the sports clubs Fremad (Est. 1938) and Frem (Est. 1926 as Arbejdernes Boldklub (AB), name change to Frem in 1932), and had its home ground at Skovsbovej Stadium. Svendborg Boldklub had for years been close to reaching promotion to the 3rd Division (then Denmark's third highest tier) via its predecessor Kvalifikationsturneringen (Qualification Tournament; popularly called the "4th Division", today known as the Denmark Series). Meanwhile, Kammeraternes Boldklub only competed in the regional divisions, the Funen Series at the fifth highest tier. Between 1961 and 1962, the "bourgeoisie" club Svendborg Boldklub and the so-called working-class side Kammeraternes Boldklub merged and continued under the new name, Svendborg forenede Boldklubber (Svendborg fB or SfB), keeping Svendborg Boldklub's original founding date. In 1970, the new sports facility, Høge Bøge Stadium, was made the club's new official home ground.

Three years after uniting with the local rivals, the merger club managed to qualify for the Danish divisions for the first time in Svendborg fB's history by securing promotion to the Danish 3rd Division ahead of the 1964 season. Divisional status was lost after relegating to the newly created Denmark Series, the fourth tier, which was the tier below the three divisions, where the club played in the 1967, 1968 and 1970 seasons. In 1969, Richard Møller Nielsen was appointed head coach for Svendborg fB. Under him, the side claimed the Danish 3rd Division West championship and reached promotion to the Danish 2nd Division in the 1972 season, the first time appearance at this level in club history. Møller Nielsen would later coach the Denmark national team to victory at the 1992 European Championship. From the 1971 season until the 2002–03 season the club had an uninterrupted run in the Danish divisions, with, among others, striker John Eriksen (1975–1977, 1991–1993). Led by head coach Viggo Jensen (1982–1987), the club experienced its third-best season in the 1986 Danish 2nd Division. At the onset of this stretch the club's spectator record also occurred, with over 8,000 spectators present at Høje Bøge Stadium on 9 November 1975 – the end of the 1975 Danish 2nd Division – where the club faced eventual promotee and regional rivals Odense Boldklub (OB). Svendborg fB never managed to participate in the highest tier of Danish football, but played in the second tier for 15 seasons the third tier for 26 seasons. Svendborg fB reached the greatest achievement its league history in the 1996–97 season, finishing third, only six points from promotion to the Danish Superliga. In a direct match for promotion at Høje Bøge Stadium against eventual promotees, Aarhus Fremad, on 9 June 1997, the Funen club lost 1–3.

After suffering relegation from the third tier following the 2002–03 season, another successive relegation saw Svendborg fB compete in the fifth tier, the former Kvalifikationsrækken, in the autumn season 2004 as a result of a last place finish in the 2003–04 Denmark Series. To make matters worse the club faced financial issues after the relegations, effectively ending their venture into professional football which saw most players leave. However, the finances and equity of SfB Prof ApS, the professional division of Svendborg fB, were normalised at an extraordinary general meeting on 26 November 2004 through a capital injection from the club's amateur division, retaining the majority shareholding, and businesses in south Funen, which meant that Svendborg fB would once again be eligible to receive a license from the Danish Football Union to conduct professional football in the event of a promotion to the Danish divisions. The club eventually won their group in the fifth division during the spring of 2005, and immediately returned to the Denmark Series. In their first season back in the fourth tier, Svendborg ended fifth in the table after having competed for promotion throughout most of the season under head coaching duo Ole Pedersen and player-coach Graham Easter. After a five-year absence from the divisions, the team managed to reach promotion to the third tier again in the 2007– 08 season, ending in second place of Group 1 of the Denmark Series.

==== Cup history ====
Svendborg Boldklub's matches (marked in red), Svendborg fB's matches (marked in black) as well as F.C. Svendborg's matches (marked in orange) in the Danish Cup between 1954 and 2010.

In the Danish Cup, "the whites from South Funen" managed to advance to two quarterfinals: in the 1976–77 season, where they were knocked out of the tournament by recently promoted second tier club Vanløse IF after a 3–0 away defeat; and in the 1989–90 season, where they lost 0–3 at Høje Bøge Stadium to Vejle Boldklub from the highest tier. Kammeraternes Boldklub never became a regular participant in the Danish Cup unlike Svendborg Boldklub, who in the early years of the tournament reached the main rounds through qualification in the regional rounds under DBU Funen. (Note: In the first round of the 1958–59 Danish Cup, a match was played between Kammeraterne and Aalborg Chang (who won the away match 1–7). It is, however, unknown whether this was the parent club of Svendborg fB, Boldklubben Vejle Kammeraterne, Frederiksberg Kammeraternes IF (now part of FA 2000), the Boldklubben Standard Kammeraterne (now part of the Kløvermarkens fB) or a completely different football club. Source: Henrik Haslund. "Pokalturneringen — alle årene". www.haslund.info. Archived from the original on 20 October 2007.) Svendborg Boldklub's first match in the cup was played in the fall of 1954 and ended in a 1–2 away defeat to the then lower division side Viborg FF. Kim Hansen, with his 378 official appearances during the 1970s and 1980s in the first team, is the record-holder of appearances for Svendborg fB.

=== First attempts of a South Funen merger (2004–2008) ===
When it became a fact that the Danish 2nd Division team from Svendborg could not avoid relegation from the Danish divisions in the 2002–03 season, local media and members of the parent club began suggesting the option of establishing a closer cooperation on a professional level with the surrounding association football clubs of Svendborg and South Funen in general. These plans had already been voiced before the 2002–03 season, and were meant to provide an opportunity to attract better sponsorship deals from local businesses. The executive board of Svendborg fB eventually met the board of its professional department on 14 May 2008 with the initial idea of a possible joint South Funen professional elite team on their agenda. The idea of a common merger of elite teams – rather than a partial or complete merger of clubs in South Funen – were at a very early stage prior to the meeting, and a committee was formed in order to continue working on the idea. The committee was assigned to, amongst others, contact representatives from smaller clubs in the area: Thurø Boldklub af 1920 and Tved Boldklub in Svendborg Municipality, who had their first teams in lower-tier regional divisions, to investigate possibilities for a large scale superstructure. However, further plans for cooperation did not come to fruition during the following months, as the regional clubs had not shown interest in the establishment of a merger project.

=== From SfB to FC Svendborg (2008) ===
As Svendborg fB reached promotion from the Denmark Series back into the Danish 2nd Division in the 2008–09 season, a number of organisational changes decided by the executive board were implemented aimed at meeting new challenges associated with returning to the divisions. To successfully reintroduce professional football in Svendborg fB for the first time since their relegation from the third tier in the 2002–03 season, club management had planned a financial goal of raising DKK 3 million in sponsor revenue as well as expanding the staff handling sponsorship deals in the professional department of Svendborg fB ahead of the following season. In order to cover salaries of the players in the first team, an external sponsorship manager, a physical therapist joining the team for home and away matches, and a coaching staff for the senior team, under-19s and under-17s, respectively, were added to the staff.

Among the strategies to achieve the necessary increase in revenue was to change the name of the first team as well as three youth teams, who would go under the name of FC Svendborg. The foundation of the elite superstructure would include the club's four best teams: a divisional team at the men's first team on senior level, an under-21 team, an under-19 team and an under-17 team; all under the helm of the club's previous affiliate elite department, SfB Elite ApS, who would continue to work closely with the parent club, so that FC Svendborg could continue to utilise the club's best amateur players. The teams representing the FC Svendborg name would have their home ground at Høje Bøge Stadium. At that point, the club's team competing in the Funen Series, the highest regional level under the DBU Funen governing body and one of the fifth highest levels of the Danish football league system, became the reserve squad for the FC Svendborg team and would continue under the name of Svendborg fB and play its home matches at Hellegårdsvej in the traditional white kits. The final decision on Svendborg fB's elite football bet – FC Svendborg – for the divisional team, U21, U19 and U17 was finally taken at the annual general assembly of the affiliate department of the parent club, SfB Elite ApS, on 30 May 2008. Thereby, it took place shortly before the first team of the future FC Svendborg reached promotion to the Danish 2nd Division. The youth teams were included in the plans for the superstructure, as they were considered a "very important part" of a future top tier first team, which would largely be assembled through its youth products serving as a "food chain" for the senior first team.

The Anpartsselskab (private limited company) behind the professional department of Svendborg fB was registered with Erhvervsstyrelsen (Danish Business Authority) on 19 December 1984 under the name SfB non-amatør ApS with the purpose of running the professional football department and was since transformed into SfB Prof. ApS, before being changed to SfB Elite ApS in the spring of 2007. In the summer of 2001, the Anpartsselskab representing the professional team struggled financially due to a lack in equity and thus struggled to have player contracts approved by the Danish FA. A new board of directors, with attorney Jens Bertel Rasmussen as new chairman and a number of business people, were brought in August 2001 to assist in both the financial and the football-related. Jens Bertel Rasmussen, who had become the chairman and was also a practicing lawyer in sports in Svendborg, had been practicing law for 25 years and had a past in the Danish FA's disciplinary committee. Svendborg fB's former tenured goalkeeper and captain of the first team, René Sundstrøm, retired his playing career in the fall of 2005, after which he was appointed the new sporting director in the professional department starting 1 January 2006. Sundstrøm replaced the outgoing sporting director Ulrik Sand Larsen, who had joined the club in August 2001 alongside the rest of the prior board.

With the name change to FC Svendborg, chairman of the professional department, Jens Bertel Rasmussen, stated that it was decided to "change the name to FC Svendborg to signal that it's the team of the entire municipality and for the benefit of the entire South Funen region" and to "ensure broad support from all of Svendborg Municipality both in the area of sports but also financially." The main reason for the name change and alterations in visual identity were attempts at distancing the new superstructure of FC Svendborg from its parent club Svendborg fB and in order to make the team more attractive to closer cooperation with the surrounding clubs from Ringe and others, and thereby secure better opportunities of bringing in talents other South Funen football clubs. A fixed division license for the under-19 and under-17 sides was acquired with the intention of becoming an attractive club to the whole of the South Funen Archipelago, which in turn contributed to the youth department's development in terms of professionalism. There was also a financial intention behind the move to employ the international abbreviation of Football Club ("FC") after the English model, as "[it] is easier to sell a single and significant brand such as FC Svendborg to sponsors." Sponsors, the press and the first-team squad were presented for the future plans and a new website on 21 June 2008 at a sponsorship meeting at Hotel Svendborg by the chairman of the professional department and vice-chairman of the new FC Svendborg, Henrik Thulesen. The initial goal set in 2007 was for the club's first team to compete in the higher divisions (tier 1–3 of the Danish football league system with the reserve team competing in the Funen Series, the highest regional tier and one of the fifth tiers of Danish football. As promotion was secured, the objective became establishing and remaining in the Danish 2nd Division, the third tier. The management did not make a definite demand for further promotion to the Danish 1st Division – the highest level which parent club Svendborg fB reached – in the near future, unless an occasion of this suddenly arose. In the long term, the club's goal was playing in Danish 1st Division, but the main priority was to "be a permanent component of divisional football (D) in Denmark" through the development of the organisation at management level, sponsorship networks, academy and first-team squad. That same summer, other elite superstructures were established for the divisional clubs FC Amager, Blokhus FC, FC Vestsjælland and Nordvest FC with foundation date of 1 July 2008.

=== First season as FC Svendborg (2008–2009) ===
==== Securing promotion to the third tier ====
In the 2007–08 season, Svendborg fB managed to secure a direct promotion spot and return to the third tier with a second-place finish Group 1 of the Denmark Series; a second place which the team had maintained since the winter break. The promotion was secured by a 3–1 away win in Helsingør on 1 June 2008 over North Zealand side Elite 3000 – four rounds before the season ending – with a massive lead of 14 points to Nivå-Kokkedal FK in third place. Beginning with a home match at Høje Bøge Stadium against B.1921 (the reserve team of Lolland-Falster Alliancen) on 26 August 2007 until the home match against Allerød FK on 8 June 2008, Svendborg fB did not suffer a single defeat in the league, which was a contributing factor to the team's promotion. The successful promotion occurred under the helm of the parent club's former youth and under-21 coach, Kurt Hansen, who had been appointed as the club's head coach on 1 July 2007. Hansen had previously made 72 appearances for Svendborg fB's first team and in 2006–2007 had coached the club's youth team, with many of the players having been promoted to the first team squad the year after. Due to the positive results which the first team achieved after the promotion, Hansen signed a two-year contract extension in January 2009. Assistant coach and under-21 coach, as well as former player, Lars Bech Petersen, was also included in the new superstructure's coaching team while René Sundstrøm became attached to the first team following the promotion as a goalkeeping coach alongside his position as director of football. The longtime player and former coach in the Danish divisions, Svend Pedersen, assumed the position as striker coach.

==== Fall season of 2008 ====
Only a few changes were made in the first team composition ahead of FC Svendborg's maiden season, as the majority of players continued, including club captain and former Faroe national team player Julian Johnsson who had also been the team's top scorer with 19 goals. Four new players joined the club from two other lower division clubs from Funen; Nyborg G&IF and BK Marienlyst, of whom three made their official debut as starters in the first match of the 2008–09 season.

FC Svendborg's season premiere, which was also the first local Funen matchup, was on 8 August 2008 at home at Høje Bøge Stadium against OB II, the reserves of Odense Boldklub, (a reserve side featuring former Denmark national football team player Morten Bisgaard and Costa Rica national football team player Christian Bolaños in the squad) in the Danish 2nd Division West Group (with 16 clubs from west of the Great Belt). The match ended in a 2–0 win in front of 693 spectators. FC Svendborg's first goal was attributed to centre-back Jonas Bertel Rasmussen, who, in the 17th minute, headed the ball into the goal at the back post after a corner kick. The score remained 1–0 at the break and FC Svendborg extended their lead against OB II, when striker Jakob Udesen scored another header off a corner eight minutes before the final whistle after an assist by Theis P. Andersen. In addition to matchups against OB II (2–0; 3– 0), there were also local Funen derbies against Næsby Boldklub (Næsby disqualified; 0–3) and the fellow promotees FC Fyn (0–3; 1–1), where the latter was the away team on 16 November 2008, where a season record of 2,838 spectators were present at Høje Bøge. Ahead of the crucial matchup of the fall season against local rivals FC Fyn, who were in a temporary third place in the league table, FC Svendborg had a point average of 1,56 (8 wins, 1 draw and 4 losses), which had amounted to an impressive second place in the West Group in periods of the fall season. Svendborg striker, Jesper Rasmussen, finished top on the league goalscorers list in the Danish 2nd Division West with 20 official goals to his name in 27 matches over the 2008–09 season – despite more than a month due to injury in the spring season of 2009 – as well as scoring a goal which the Danish FA (DBU) did not credit him for. (Note: Jesper Rasmussen has officially been credited by the Danish Football Union (DBU) for a total of 20 goals in the Danish 2nd Division West for the 2008–09 season, whereas newspapers, statisticians and FC Svendborg have chosen to include his goal in the home game on 27 August 2008 against Næsby Boldklub, which was lost 1– 2. FC Svendborg protested the decision of Næsby to field ineligible player Mads Bartram to the DBU disciplinary committee, which resulted in Næsby being disqualified and FC Svendborg being awarded the match 3–0 in accordance with §36.2 of the DBU's proposals, whereby Jesper Rasmussen is listed down for 21 goals. Source: Lars Berendt (1 October 2008). "Næsby fratages syv points". Dansk Boldspil-Union. Archived from the original on 4 March 2016. and Jesper Helmin (10 June 2009). "FCS forlænger med kvartet". bold.dk. Archived from the original on 10 February 2021.)

==== Issues with licensing ====
In the same season, the DBU Licensing Committee and the Men's Elite Youth Committee awarded FC Svendborg a one-year "Wild Card" – rather than a permanent license – for divisional football for the club's main youth team, as they were deemed to have sufficient strength to participate in the higher divisions; the under-19 and under-17 teams both participated in the second tiers of their respective age groups. The Svendborg side's youth team was not initially granted a Category B license by the DBU, who subsequently met the club's appeal for their failure to grant a license – a new licensing system introduced in February 2008 focusing on training facilities which replaced a system with a focus on the promotion and relegation of youth teams. The youth teams worked as a continuation of Svendborg fB's former U18 team, and the U16-team, which played in the highest nationwide U16-division during the spring season of 2008. During the 2008–09 season, the DBU licensed the club, and on 23 April it was notified that the conditions and requirements for obtaining divisional status had been met. On this basis, a Category B license was granted, which secured the youth teams' continued participation in their respective youth divisions for the 2009–10 season with a fixed division license.

==== Spring season of 2009 ====
The newly promoted merger side of Svendborg went on winter break as seventh in the league table of the West Group; a group which was represented by six reserve teams for Danish Superliga clubs, including the aforementioned OB II team. FC Svendborg kicked off their 2009 spring campaign with a 2–1 home win on 22 Match 2009 against top team in the group and eventual promotees to Danish 1st Division, Brabrand IF from the Aarhus region. The main objective for the first team at the start of the Danish 2nd Division had initially been to establish themselves in the division by reaching the "34 point limit"; a goal which almost mathematically could save them from relegation. This feat was reached in the final away match of the season against FC Fyn on 3 May 2009, which meant that the team was freed from the threat of relegation. FC Svendborg ended the season in ninth place in the table after only gaining seven points from the play-off matches for promotion to the 1st Division, falling off from the strong showings of the fall. Ahead of the 2009–10 season, 25 players were offered a contract during the initial contract negotiations with, among others, FC Svendborg director of football René Sundstrøm, without any new players being signed from other clubs.

The biggest win of the season occurred on 16 May 2009 away against AGF's Superliga-reserves, where FC Svendborg won 5–0, while the biggest loss (2–4) took place three times: against Blokhus FC, Varde IF and Aarhus Fremad, respectively. The first team did not participate in the Danish Cup during its 2008–09 campaign, after being knocked out in a 0–2 loss to Stige Boldklub from the Funen Series – from the regional fifth division – in the inaugural fourth round before the main rounds of the cup.

=== Stabilisation and downfall (2009–2017) ===
In the 2009–10 season, FC Svendborg consolidated in the third tier, losing only twice in the spring and finishing seventh—an improvement on the previous campaign. The club repeated seventh place in 2010–11, after which head coach Kurt Hansen—who had led Svendborg up from the Denmark Series—left to take charge of Tved Boldklub in the Funen Series. He was succeeded on 20 June 2011 by U19 coach Carsten Mikkelsen, who set a long-term goal of promotion to the Danish 1st Division.

Svendborg opened 2011–12 with four winless matches before beating Aarup BK 3–1 on 4 September 2011; results stabilised thereafter and the team reached the winter break in mid-table. The only senior departure before the spring was midfielder Jacob Mouritsen, who rejoined local rivals FC Fyn.

Two seventh-place finishes in the 2nd Division West followed, before a fifth-place finish in 2012–13 under head coach Carsten Mikkelsen. In December 2013. Mikkelsen departed to focus on his civil career and was succeeded by Carsten Hemmingsen. Hemmingsen left during the winter break of the 2014–15 season to join Middelfart Boldklub, with Julian Johnsson appointed as replacement.

Results remained modest and largely bottom-half thereafter. In June 2016, the club named Michael Schjønberg head coach for 2016–17, but he was dismissed in October amid financial uncertainty linked to reduced sponsor income. Bankruptcy was initially averted in November 2016, a new coaching team and board were installed, and several key players departed during the winter window. On 10 June 2017 the club was relegated to the Denmark Series after a 5–2 defeat to Odder IGF. The board the same day restored the name Svendborg fB (SfB), citing reputational damage from the season's financial turmoil, but one week later the club filed for bankruptcy and was placed in the sixth-tier DBU Funen Series 1.

=== Rebirth, merger and return to third tier (2017–present) ===
Svendborg fB re-established its senior side in 2017–18, won promotion from Series 1, and secured a place in the fifth-tier Funen Series on 27 May 2018.

Ahead of the 2018–19 season, the club created an elite setup with Oure FA, the football department of Skolerne i Oure (a Danish boarding-school complex). The new joint first team, SfB–Oure FA, assumed Oure FA's licence and entered the Denmark Series (fourth tier). On 20 June 2020. the side won promotion to the Danish 2nd Division (third tier) with a 3–2 victory over Otterup B&IK.
