= Marienlystcentret =

Football stadium in Denmark

- Interactive map of Marienlystcentret
- Full name: Marienlystcentret
- Location: Odense, Denmark
- Coordinates: 55°25′21″N 10°23′50.90″E
- Capacity: 1,200
- Surface: Grass

Construction
- Opened: 13 March 1976

Tenant
- BK Marienlyst

Marienlystcentret is a sports complex located in Odense, Denmark. Its main venue is the stadium, which has a capacity of 1,200 and is home to the association football department of BK Marienlyst, which plays in the fourth-tier Denmark Series. The complex also contains an arena where the volleyball team and other sports teams are located.
