= Boldklubben Marienlyst =

Association football club in Odense, Denmark

Marienlyst
- Full name: Boldklubben Marienlyst
- Short name: BM
- Founded: 2 May 1922; 103 years ago
- Ground: Marienlystcentret, Odense
- Capacity: 1,200
- Chairman: Peter Larsen
- Head coach: Thomas Vindelev Johansen
- League: Denmark Series
- 2024–25: Denmark Series Group 3, 2nd of 10; Promotion group West, 6th of 10
- Website: b-marienlyst.dk
| Home colours | Away colours |

Boldklubben Marienlyst, commonly known as BK Marienlyst, Marienlyst, or BM, is an association football club based in Odense, Denmark, that competes in the Denmark Series, the fifth tier of the Danish football league system. Founded in 1922, it is affiliated to the regional DBU Funen football association. The team plays its home matches at Marienlystcentret, which has a capacity of 1,200. The club recognises itself as the "eternal Funen Series club", and has only played a few season in the higher divisions.

The volleyball department is one of the best of its kind in Denmark, winning 9 Danish championships.

== History ==
=== Early history ===
Boldklubben Marienlyst was founded in 1922, and it is thus Odense's fifth oldest still existing football club, after OB, B 1909, B 1913 and Odense KFUM. The founders were boys playing association football at Marienlystgade (now Marienlystvej) and surrounding streets, and they named the club after the street in the Skibhus district.

The club's first pitch was a newly harvested field next to a grocery store on Skibhusvej 242. Dressing took place in open air. The players' kits were – regardless of the weather – hung in a bushes and trees.

The club's first clubhouse was an ice cream parlour. In 1923, the board gave one of the members, Svend Zachariasen, permission to erect an ice cream parlour for an annual payment of DKK 110. Soda and homemade ice cream were sold there. Isboden Marienlyst was written on a small sign above the serving hatch. The first real clubhouse with a small changing room was built in 1924 by voluntary labour. The clubhouse and the pitch were located on the corner plot of Skibhusvej / Drejøgade, where Marienlund Nursing Home was later built.

In 1928, Marienlyst had a pitch and clubhouse on the opposite side of Skibhusvej, by Sandhusvej, which became the club's home ground for almost half a century. The entrance to the railway facility was initially next to Skibhusvej, and on the long side by Sandhusvej there was a small grandstand. Marienlyst was enrolled in Fyns Boldspil-Union (DBU Funen) in 1923 and was placed in the FBU B-række division, the third regional tier of the local association. However, due to the favourable geographical location in an area with many families and youths, the club quickly became one of Funen's most prominent. They made their debut in the FBUs Mesterrække in 1926; the highest regional level.

Three times – in 1929, 1921 and 1933 – Marienlyst won the Funen Cup. In 1929, 1,000 spectators saw the club beat local rivals Odense Boldklub (OB)'s first team 1–0 in the cup final.

=== Achievements in the 1970s ===
The 1970s proved to be some of the most active periods in the history of Marienlyst. The current home ground of the club, Marienlystcentret, was inaugurated during this decade, as was the fanclub Boldklubben Marienlysts Venner. The facilities on Sandhusvej had become too cramped, and in the early 1970s club management succeeded to create the possibility relocating to a large municipal plot between Windelsvej and Hedvigslundskoven. Among other things, by virtue of a very extensive voluntary workforce, Marienlyst was able to build a new sports center with two indoor sporting facilities, seven football pitches, and rooms for players and staff. After some meagre years, where the club struggled in the Series 1 (second regional tier – sixth national tier) up through the 1970s, they finally managed to turn it around in 1977 to secure promotion to the Funen Series. In 1979, Marienlyst even managed to win the Funen Series with a strong team coached by Arnold Petersen, and achieve promotion to the Denmark Series. Well-known Marienlyst profiles from the 1970s were, Lars Petersen, Preben "Tordenskjold" Knudsen (later OB), Preben Frøtorp, Allan Hoffmann Nielsen, Allan Jakobsen, Henrik Petersen and goalkeeper Bjarne Sørensen. The club's record for first team appearances is held by Lars Petersen with 432 (between 1972–1995), followed by Allan Hoffmann Nielsen (1973–1991) with 409 and Preben Hansen (1970–1988) with 320.

=== Recent years ===
In 2011, Marienlyst reached promotion to the 2nd Division (third-tier) for the first time in club history, after a 4–0 win over Kolding IF. After two years in the third best tier, the club even reached promotion to the 1st Division in 2013 after promotion rivals Aarhus Fremad only managed a 0–0 result against Kjellerup IF. Some weaker years followed, however, and by 2019, Marienlyst were back in the fourth tier again.

=== Volleyball ===
Marienlyst volleyball department was established in 1976.

They have won 9 national championships and 3 NEVZA Club Championships

== Honours ==
- Danish Cup
  - Round of 16 (3): 1955–56, 1963–63, 2016–17
- Funen Football Championship
  - Winners (4): 1937–38, 1939–40, 1979, 2007
  - Runners-up (8): 1934–35, 1938–39, 1945–46, 1948–49, 1986, 2000, 2005, 2008–09
- FBUs Pokalturnering
  - Winners (3): 1929, 1931, 1933
  - Runners-up (2): 1934, 1935

== See also ==
- Boldklubben Marienlyst players
