= 1959 Danish 1st Division =

14th season of Danish 1st Division

Danish 1st Division
- Season: 1959

The 1959 Danish 1st Division season was the 14th edition of Danish 1st Division annual football competition in Denmark. It was contested by 12 teams.

Vejle Boldklub unsuccessfully defended its 1958 title. Boldklubben 1909 successfully pursued its 1959 title.

Statistics of Danish 1st Division in the 1959 season.

== League standings ==
Pos	Team	Pld	W	D	L	GF	GA	GD	Pts
1	Boldklubben 1909	22	14	5	3	47	28	+19	33
2	Kjøbenhavns Boldklub	22	15	1	6	48	27	+21	31
3	Vejle Boldklub	22	14	1	7	47	37	+10	29
4	Odense Boldklub	22	13	1	8	49	37	+12	27
5	Aarhus Gymnastikforening	22	10	2	10	39	39	0	22
6	Esbjerg fB	22	8	5	9	36	32	+4	21
7	Akademisk Boldklub	22	9	3	10	51	53	−2	21
8	Boldklubben Frem	22	8	4	10	45	44	+1	20
9	Skovshoved IF	22	8	4	10	32	50	−18	20
10	Boldklubben 1903	22	7	4	11	35	38	−3	18
11	Køge BK	22	7	2	13	31	40	−9	16
12	Boldklubben af 1893	22	2	2	18	27	62	−35	6

== Results ==
Home \ Away	ABK	AGF	B93	B03	B09	EFB	BKF	KB	KBK	OB	SKO	VBK
Akademisk BK	—	1–2	4–2	0–1	2–3	3–3	5–5	4–6	4–3	0–1	5–1	0–3
Aarhus GF	1–4	—	4–2	2–0	1–1	3–0	3–1	1–3	1–3	3–2	2–1	0–1
B.93	3–4	1–3	—	1–0	2–5	0–4	2–0	0–1	2–4	0–4	1–1	2–4
B 1903	4–0	1–1	1–1	—	1–2	1–1	1–1	0–5	3–2	4–2	7–0	1–3
B 1909	4–0	4–3	5–2	1–0	—	2–1	2–0	1–1	2–0	4–2	1–1	0–2
Esbjerg fB	2–1	2–1	1–0	1–2	1–1	—	3–1	0–2	0–0	2–3	1–1	1–2
BK Frem	3–3	0–3	2–1	3–0	1–3	2–1	—	1–4	1–1	1–2	5–0	3–1
Kjøbenhavns BK	1–3	3–0	2–1	1–5	2–0	4–0	0–3	—	2–0	1–0	0–2	1–3
Køge BK	1–2	2–1	4–1	2–1	2–0	1–5	0–3	0–2	—	0–1	0–1	3–4
Odense BK	2–0	2–1	2–1	5–1	2–2	0–4	4–2	1–2	1–0	—	1–2	6–2
Skovshoved IF	0–3	2–3	3–2	2–1	0–1	0–2	2–6	1–5	3–1	3–2	—	0–0
Vejle BK	2–3	3–0	4–0	2–0	2–3	2–1	3–1	1–0	0–2	2–4	1–6	—

Legend: Blue = home team win; Yellow = draw; Red = away team win.
