= Tommy Kristiansen (footballer) =

Danish footballer

Personal information
- Full name: Tommy Praefke Kristiansen
- Date of birth: 8 October 1953 (age 73)
- Place of birth: Frederiksberg, Denmark
- Height: 1.69 m (5 ft 7 in)
- Position: Midfielder

Senior career*
Years	Team	Apps	(Gls)
1974–1975	Vanløse IF		
1976–1981	Go Ahead Eagles	123	(14)
1978	→ Feyenoord (loan)	10	(1)
1981–1982	Edmonton Drillers		
1982–1984	HFC Haarlem		
1985	Brønshøj Boldklub		
1985–1986	SC Heerenveen		

International career
1975	Denmark U21	1	(0)
1977–1979	Denmark	2	(0)
- * Club domestic league appearances and goals

Tommy Praefke Kristiansen (born 8 October 1953) is a Danish former footballer who played as a midfielder. He played in two matches for the Denmark national team from 1977 to 1979.
