= FBUs Pokalturnering =

- Organiser(s): Funen FA (FBU)
- Founded: 1920; 106 years ago
- Abolished: 1953; 73 years ago
- Region: Funen, Denmark
- Teams: Varied (1920–1953)
- Last champions: B 1909 (1953)
- Most championships: B 1909 (14 titles)

FBUs Pokalturnering (unofficial English translation: FBU Cup or Funen Cup) was a Danish regional knockout association football competition contested annually from 1920 to 1953 by members of the regional football association Funen FA (FBU). Organised by and named after FBU, it was the third regional cup competition introduced on a national level, and the second in the province, after the KBUs Pokalturnering in 1910 and the LFBUs Pokalturnering in 1915. The 1953 season of the cup tournament became the last edition due to the Danish FA's introduction of a new national-wide cup competition in 1954.

For the most part, the matches in the competition took place during the course of the fall season, beginning in the summer months with the first round, and culminating in a final match later in the same half season, but due to scheduling issues some finals and replay matches were not played until the following year. Despite a modest start for the tournament, several cup matches evolved into major events, receiving much media coverage at both regional and national level, becoming topics of prolonged conversation in the local community and marking cities and villages for a few days.

== History ==
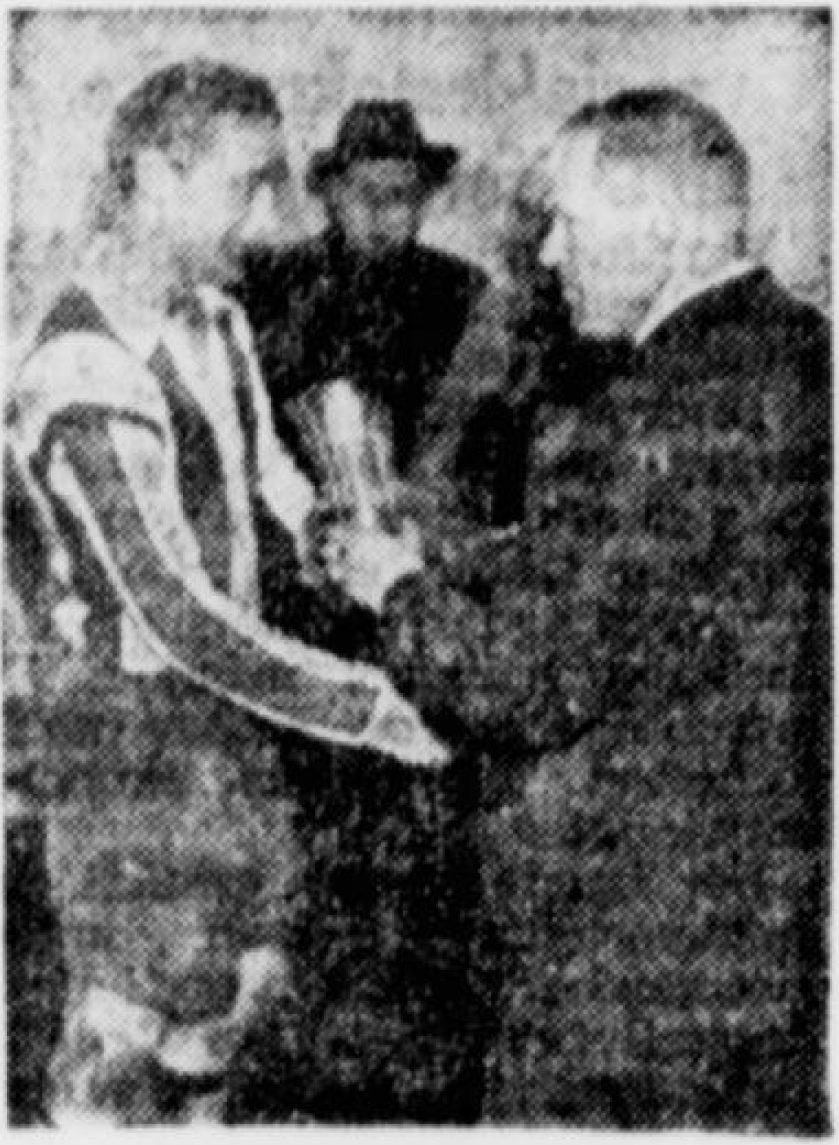
Odense BK captain Jørgen Leschly Sørensen (left) receiving the fourth version of the trophy from Funen FA's representative Palle Nielsen (right) after winning the 1948 cup final match against B 1909.

In the summer of 1920, the board of Funen FA formed a new cup tournament, named FBUs Pokalturnering, initially intended to be held during the months of August and September, hence taking place before the start of the regional association's own league tournaments. The reasoning behind its establishment was to include an additional competitive tournament, that could function as training for players aiming towards being selected on the regional squad for the recently installed Sylow-Tournament, gather more interest from spectators and give the clubs an additional source of income. The tournament was installed with rules applied for a knockout competition with the composition of the each match being determined by drawing lots. In order to determine a match winner if a game was tied, an additional extra time (two periods of 15 minutes each) was to be played followed by 15 minutes with an early implementation of the golden goal format (g.e.t./g.g.) — the first team to score a goal would win the match giving a maximum of 135 minutes of total match play. Between 1920 and 1928, the tournament rules stated that an additional extra time (two periods of 15 minutes each) should be played to determine cup finals, that were tied after full time (90 minutes). In 1929, the rules were changed, so that a replay match was scheduled, if a semi-final or final match was tied.

The rules has varied throughout the years, but the competition has always remained open to all Funen FA member clubs, both clubs playing in the association's city league tournaments (byklubber) and in village league tournaments (landklubber), basing participation on registration rather than qualification. As a consequence the number of participants have varied greatly throughout the tournament's history starting with seven teams (B 1909, B 1913, Odense BK, Svendborg BK, Kerteminde FK, Assens G&IK and Hundslev BK) in the 1920 edition and steadily increasing the number to 66 teams in the 1944 edition. First introduced at the ninth cup edition, the tournament also began being open to reserve teams, who on several occasions were matched against the same club's first teams. B 1909's reserve team reached the semi-finals of the 1942 edition, where they were drawn against the club's first team, and losing the match 8–1.

On 4 October 1919, the Danish government placed an amusement tax of 40% on certain sport events, which affected the conduct of and attendance figures at association football matches with admissions, causing either entrance fees to be abolished, making competitive and exhibition matches completely free or having clubs limit their games to active and passive members-only to avoid the taxation. Hence, in order to attend the first cup final match on 29 August 1920 between Odense BK and reigning regional league champions B 1909, spectators had to already be (or become beforehand) a member of one of the regional football association's clubs. If a club decided to take admission to a cup match, the Funen FA had determined the entrance fee should be minimum DKK 1 (as per 1920) and half the price for children.

Despite the Danish FA establishing the short-lived nation-wide cup tournament, Danmarkspokalturneringen in 1940, the regional Funen Cup tournament continued its existence. At a meeting on 15 June 1945, the Funen FA cancelled the 1945 edition due to the difficult travel conditions in place at the end of Denmark's occupation in World War II, and instead focusing their efforts on rebooting the regional league tournaments. The Funen cup tournament was discontinued after the 1953 edition ahead of the introduction of the national-wide cup competition beginning in 1954, the DBUs Landspokalturnering, organised by the Danish FA (DBU).

The most successful club in the history of the tournament's 33 editions was B 1909, who won a total of fourteen cup titles and appeared as a losing finalist on nine occasions. Only seven clubs, and mostly clubs from the main city on the island of Funen, Odense (especially B 1909, B 1913 and Odense BK), appeared in the finals. A club had to win five cup championship finals, also known as lots, in order to keep the silver trophy permanently — the trophy was distributed as a perpetual prize kept by the winner until the next season. The first trophy was financed by Fyns Boldspil-Union and was eventually won by B 1909 in 1930, the second trophy was won by B 1913 in 1939, while the third trophy, valued at DKK 600 (as per 1941), was won by B 1909 in 1944 after five consecutive cup titles and having the only club name on the trophy. A fourth version of the trophy was installed by the Foreningen til Indkøb af Boldspilrekvisiter A/S (F.I.B.).

== Finals ==
Key	Explanation
^{†}	Winners also won the Funen championship (1920–1936) or the Danish championship (1936–1953) during the same season.
^{‡}	Team was playing outside the top division of the regional (1920–1936) or national (1936–1953) league structure.
(a.e.t.)	After extra time (two periods of 15 minutes each) in use between 1920 and 1928. Additional match was scheduled, if game was still tied.
(R)	Replay match (entire new match scheduled) in use between 1929 and 1953; 1R = 1st replay match; 2R = 2nd replay match
(number of cup wins)	A running tally of the total number of cup titles won by each club is kept in brackets.

Season	Final Date	Winners	Result	Runners–up	Venue	Attendance	Ref
1920	29 August 1920	Odense BK (1)	4–3	B 1909	OB's Bane i Munke Mose, Odense	700	
1921	4 September 1921	B 1909 (1)^{†}	4–3	Odense BK	Munke Mose, Odense	1,500	
1922	27 August 1922	B 1909 (2)	3–1	Odense BK	Munke Mose, Odense	1,000	
1923	26 August 1923	B 1909 (3)	5–2	B 1922	Østergade, Odense	400	
1924	31 August 1924	Odense BK (2)^{†}	2–0	B 1909	Østergade, Odense	1,000	
1925	—N/a	B 1913 (1)	2–0	Odense BK	B 1913's Bane bag Assistens Kirkegård, Odense	—N/a	
1926	5 September 1926	B 1913 (2)	3–1	Odense BK	OB's Bane i Munke Mose, Odense	550	
1927	25 September 1927	B 1913 (3)^{†}	5–2	B 1909	Østergade, Odense	2,000	
1928	2 September 1928	B 1909 (4)	4–3	Svendborg BK	Østergade, Odense	600	
1929	—N/a	BK Marienlyst (1)	1–0	Odense BK	Marienlund	1,000	
1930	9 November 1930	B 1909 (5)^{†}	3–0	B 1913	B 1913's Bane bag Assistens Kirkegård, Odense	750	
1931	15 November 1931	BK Marienlyst (2)	3–2	Odense BK	Odense Idrætspark ved Kildemosen, Odense	750	
1932	20 November 1932	B 1913 (4)^{†}	2–1	B 1909	Odense Idrætspark ved Kildemosen, Odense	1,600	
1933	5 November 1933	BK Marienlyst (3)	2–1	Odense BK	B 1909's Bane i Østergade, Odense	—N/a	
1934	18 November 1934	B 1913 (5)	4–0	BK Marienlyst	Odense Idrætspark ved Kildemosen, Odense	550	
1935	17 November 1935	B 1913 (6)^{†}	3–1	BK Marienlyst	Odense Idrætspark ved Kildemosen, Odense	—N/a	
1936	22 November 1936	B 1909 (6)^{‡}	3–1	B 1913^{‡}	B 1909's Bane i Østergade, Odense	2,400	
1937	28 November 1937	B 1913 (7)^{‡}	7–2	Odense BK^{‡}	B 1913's Bane bag Assistens Kirkegård, Odense	750	
1938	27 November 1938	B 1909 (7)^{‡}	3–1	Odense BK^{‡}	B 1909's Bane i Østergade, Odense	1,500	
1939	19 November 1939	B 1913 (8)^{‡}	3–0	B 1909^{‡}	B 1909's Bane i Østergade, Odense	3,000	
1940	25 August 1940	B 1909 (8)	1–0	B 1913	B 1913's Bane bag Assistens Kirkegård, Odense	1,500	
1941	30 November 1941	B 1909 (9)	5–3	B 1913	Odense Stadium, Odense	5,000	
1942	26 August 1942	B 1909 (10)	2–0	Odense BK	Odense Stadium, Odense	5,000	
1943	28 November 1943	B 1909 (11)	3–1	Odense KFUM^{‡}	Odense Stadium, Odense	1,500	
1944	26 November 1944	B 1909 (12)	1–0	Odense KFUM^{‡}	Odense Stadium, Odense	2,000	
1945	Not played						
1946	8 December 1946	B 1913 (9)^{‡}	4–0	Odense BK^{‡}	Odense Stadium, Odense	3,000	
1947	20 September 1947	Svendborg BK (1)^{‡}	2–2	B 1909^{‡}	Odense Stadium, Odense	1,800	
1947 (1R)	9 November 1947	Svendborg BK (1)^{‡}	1–1	B 1909^{‡}	Høje Bøge Stadium, Svendborg	700	
1947 (2R)	15 November 1947	Svendborg BK (1)^{‡}	2–1	B 1909^{‡}	Odense Stadium, Odense	1,600	
1948	24 October 1948	Odense BK (3)	3–1	B 1909	Odense Stadium, Odense	6,500	
1949	21 May 1950	Odense BK (4)	1–0	B 1909^{‡}	Odense Stadium, Odense	7,000	
1950	19 November 1950	B 1909 (13)	1–1	Odense BK	Odense Stadium, Odense	5,000	
1950 (R)	24 May 1951	B 1909 (13)	3–2	Odense BK	Odense Stadium, Odense	4,300	
1951	18 November 1951	Odense BK (5)	2–2	B 1913^{‡}	Odense Stadium, Odense	2,100	
1951 (1R)	16 December 1951	Odense BK (5)	1–1	B 1913^{‡}	Odense Stadium, Odense	2,000	
1951 (2R)	20 May 1952	Odense BK (5)	3–2	B 1913^{‡}	Odense Stadium, Odense	1,200	
1952	9 November 1952	B 1913 (10)^{‡}	5–2	B 1909	Odense Stadium, Odense	2,000	
1953	13 December 1953	B 1909 (14)^{‡}	4–2	Odense BK	Odense Stadium, Odense	5,600	

== Results by team ==
Teams shown in italics are no longer in existence. B 1909 won the second and last edition, won the most cup titles and lost the second largest number of final matches.

Club	Wins	First final won	Last final won	Runners-up	Last final lost	Total final appearances
B 1909	14	1921	1953	9	1952	23
B 1913	10	1925	1952	5	1951	15
Odense BK	5	1920	1951	13	1953	18
BK Marienlyst	3	1929	1933	2	1935	5
Svendborg BK	1	1947	1947	1	1928	2
Odense KFUM	0	—	—	2	1944	2
B 1922	0	—	—	1	1923	1
