= Høje Bøge Stadium =

Football stadium in Denmark

Høje Bøge
- Interactive map of Høje Bøge
- Full name: Høje Bøge Stadium
- Location: Skovvej 18; DK-5700 Svendborg
- Coordinates: 55°03′17″N 10°35′42″E
- Capacity: 7,000
- Surface: Natural grass
- Record attendance: 8,000 (Svendborg fB vs Odense Boldklub, 1975)
- Field size: 102 by 65 metres (111.5 yd × 71.1 yd)

Construction
- Built: 1930
- Renovated: 1994

Tenants
- Svendborg Boldklub (1930–1962); Svendborg fB (1962–present); FC Svendborg (2008–2017); SfB-Oure FA (2019–present)

Høje Bøge Stadium (Danish: [ˈhʌjə ˈpøːjə]) is an association football stadium in Svendborg, Denmark. It is the home stadium of Danish 2nd Division club SfB-Oure FA. It has a capacity of 7,000, but the attendance record is 8,000 which happened in 1975 in a local matchup against Odense Boldklub in the second tier of the Danish football league system.

The stadium is the historic home ground of Svendborg fB (SfB), and since its superstructures: FC Svendborg, founded in 2008 and dissolved in 2017, as well as the merger team of SfB and Oure Fodbold Akademi (Oure FA): SfB Oure FA. The latter started using Høje Bøge as their home ground prior to the 2019–20 Denmark Series season, after moving from the pitches at Hellegårdsvej / Tipsvænget.

== History ==
The name Høje Bøge literally means "tall beeches" and refers to the beech trees which surround the site of the stadium.

On 9 June 1997, Svendborg fB hosted Aarhus Fremad in a direct match for promotion to the Danish Superliga on Høje Bøge, which ended in disappointment for the home side which lost 1–3 and would miss out on the historic achievement.

Each summer, Høje Bøge hosts the one-day festival Høje Bøge Open Air, which is organised by Svendborg fB.
