= DBU Funen =

Sports governing body in Funen, Denmark

- Abbreviation: DBUF
- Formation: 7 February 1904; 122 years ago
- Purpose: Football association
- Location: Odense
- Chairman: Bjarne Christensen
- Website: Official website

DBU Funen (Danish: DBU Fyn) is the local governing body for association football and futsal on Funen and the surrounding isles, Denmark. They are responsible for the governance and development of men's and women's football at all levels in the region. DBU Funen is a member of the Union of Local Football Associations in Denmark (FLU) under the Danish Football Association (DBU) and National Olympic Committee and Sports Confederation of Denmark (DIF). The headquarters is located in the western part of Odense. Clubs situated on Funen and surrounding areas, covering the postal codes between 5000 and 5999 can be accepted as members of DBU Funen. In 2017 the football association consisted of 158 clubs and 28,993 members with Dalum IF being the largest club membership-wise. Founded on 10 July 1904, it is the fourth oldest regional football association under the Danish FA and kept its original name, Fyns Boldspil-Union (FBU), until 1 February 2011, where it was changed to its current name, DBU Fyn.

== History ==
Former og current logos:

Fyns Boldspil-Union
100 years anniversary

Fyns Boldspil-Union (Until 01.02.2011)

DBU Fyn
(01.02.2011–2016?)

DBU Fyn
(2016?–present)

== Competitions ==
As of 2016, the football association administers the local men's senior leagues at level 5 in the Danish football league system besides women's and youth football. The top league at the local senior men's level under the football association's administration is called Fynsserien and was regarded as one among several top regional leagues in Danish football between 1904 and 1927. Before the national "knockout" cup competition, DBU Pokalen, was introduced in 1954, the football association had its own regional cup competitions known as FBUs Pokalturnering, which was contested between 1920 and 1953. Clubs playing at the lower leagues participate in the qualification rounds for the first round proper of DBU Pokalen.

=== Senior Men's ===
- Leagues
  - Fynsserien (transl. Funen Series)
  - Serie 1 (transl. Series 1)
  - Serie 2 (transl. Series 2)
  - Serie 3 (transl. Series 3)
  - Serie 4 (transl. Series 4)
  - Serie 5 (transl. Series 5)
- Cups
  - Qualification for DBU Pokalen (transl. The DBU Cup)
  - Herresenior Pokalturnering (Albani Pokalen for Herrer) for clubs playing in Series 3 to Series 5

=== Senior Women's ===
- Leagues
  - Kvinde-Fynsserien (transl. Women's Funen Series)
  - Kvinde Serie 1 (transl. Women's Series 1)
  - Kvinde Serie 2 (transl. Women's Series 2)
- Cups
  - Qualification for DBU Kvindepokalen (transl. The DBU's Women's Cup)
  - Damesenior Pokalturnering (Albani Pokalen for Kvinder) for clubs playing in Kvinde-Fynsserien to Series 2

=== Defunct ===
- FBUs Pokalturnering (1920–1953) for the FBU member clubs

== List of chairmen ==
A total of 8 different persons have been chairman for DBU Funen.

- 1904–1908: Max Smith, Odense BK
- 1908–1944: Niels Jensen, Odense BK
- 1944–1964: Egon Larsen, Odense KFUM
- 1964–1983: Carl Anton Kofoed, Odense BK
- 1983–1997: Ernst Christensen, Nyborg G&IF
- 1997–2002: Allan Hansen, Middelfart G&BK
- 2002–2013: Thomas Bytoft, Thurø BK
- 2013–present: Bjarne Christensen, Dalum IF
