= Boldklubben 1909 =

Association football club in Denmark

- Full name: Boldklubben 1909
- Nickname: Nierne (The Niners)
- Founded: 1909; 117 years ago
- Ground: Gillested Park
- Capacity: 6,000
- Chairman: Finn Ravn
- Coach: Dani Nørgaard
- League: Funen Series
- 2025–26: Funen Series, 10th of 14
- Website: https://www.b1909.dk/
Home colours	Away colours

Boldklubben 1909 (known as B1909) is a Danish association football club based in Odense, Denmark. The club plays in the Funen Series, the fifth tier of the Danish football league system. The club's home grounds is Gillested Park which has a capacity of 6,000. Founded in 1909, the club spent a total 38 seasons in the Danish championship from 1912 to 1993, and won the 1959 and 1964 Danish 1st Division championships, as well as the 1962 and 1971 Danish Cup trophies.

In the 2006–07 season, the first team of B1909 merged with B 1913 and Dalum IF, to form FC Fyn. B 1909's new first team continued in the Danish league system, but had to stay two leagues below FC Fyn. In 2013, as FC Fyn was dissolved, the three mother clubs were reestablished in the lower leagues.

== Honours ==
- Danish Football Championship
  - Winners (2): 1959, 1964
- Danish Cup
  - Winners (2): 1961–62, 1970–71
  - Runners-up (1): 1976–77
- Provinsmesterskabsturneringen
  - Winners (1): 1931
  - Runners-up (1): 1926–27
- Funen Football Championship
  - Winners (16): 1919–20, 1920–21, 1921–22, 1926–27, 1930–31, 1931–32, 1934–35, 1951–52^{‡}, 1952–53^{‡}, 1958^{‡}, 1961^{‡}, 1962^{‡}, 1964^{‡}, 1981^{‡}, 2012–13^{R}, 2016–17
  - Runners-up (24): 1916–17, 1917–18, 1918–19, 1922–23, 1923–24, 1928–29, 1929–30, 1932–33, 1933–34, 1935–36, 1941–42^{‡}, 1946–47^{‡}, 1947–48^{‡}, 1955–56^{‡}, 1956–57^{‡}, 1959^{‡}, 1960^{‡}, 1963^{‡}, 1974^{‡}, 1979^{‡}, 1980^{‡}, 2011s^{R}, 2011–12^{R}, 2013–14, 2020–21
- FBUs Pokalturnering
  - Winners (14) – record: 1921, 1922, 1923, 1928, 1930, 1936, 1938, 1940, 1941, 1942, 1943, 1944, 1950, 1953
  - Runners-up (9): 1920, 1924, 1927, 1932, 1939, 1947, 1948, 1949, 1952

^{‡}: Honour achieved by reserve team
^{R}: Status as a reserve team for FC Fyn

== Achievements ==
- 38 seasons in the Highest Danish League
- 38 seasons in the Second Highest Danish League
- 9 seasons in the Third Highest Danish League

== See also ==
- Boldklubben 1909 (women)
