= Vanløse IF =

Danish association football club

- Full name: Vanløse Idræts Forening
- Nickname: City in a City
- Short name: VIF
- Founded: 1921; 105 years ago
- Ground: Vanløse Idrætspark, Vanløse, Copenhagen
- Capacity: 10,000
- Chairman: Knud Toft Andersen
- Manager: Mads Hadberg
- League: Danish 3rd Division
- 2025–26: Danish 3rd Division, 5th of 12
Home colours	Away colours

Vanløse IF is a Danish professional football club based in the Vanløse area of Copenhagen, that competes in the Danish 3rd Division. The club has a rich history with former players like Preben Elkjær and Michael Laudrup and have won the Danish Cup in 1974. It currently has about 1000 members.

== Honours ==
- Danish Cup
  - Winners (1): 1973–74

== Achievements ==
- 2 seasons in the Highest Danish League
- 23 seasons in the Second Highest Danish League
- 18 seasons in the Third Highest Danish League
