= Dalum IF =

Association football club in Odense, Denmark

- Full name: Dalum Idrætsforening
- Founded: 28 June 1931
- Ground: Dalum Stadion, Odense
- Capacity: 4,000
- Chairman: Mick Breith
- Manager: Christoffer Földes
- League: Denmark Series
- 2022–23: 3rd Division, 12th of 12 (relegated)
Home colours	Away colours

Dalum Idrætsforening is a Danish football club currently playing in the Denmark Series, the fifth tier of the Danish divisions. They play at Dalum Stadion in the southern parts of Odense on Funen, a stadium with a capacity of 4,000. Founded in 1931, the club rose to prominence in the late 1990s, playing two seasons in the second tier, Danish 1st Division and six seasons in the third tier Danish 2nd Division from 1998 to 2006, and again from 2015–16.

== History ==
Starting from the 2006–07 season, they merged with B 1909 and B 1913, with new team FC Fyn their combined first team. This club dissolved in 2013.

In April 2023, Dalum were mentioned among the worst teams of Europe of the 2022–23 season, having recorded 23 losses out of 23 games, 0 points and a goal difference of –77. They soon after broke their remarkable losing record, beating AB Tårnby 3–0 on 22 April 2023.
