= Boldklubben 1913 =

Danish football club

B1913
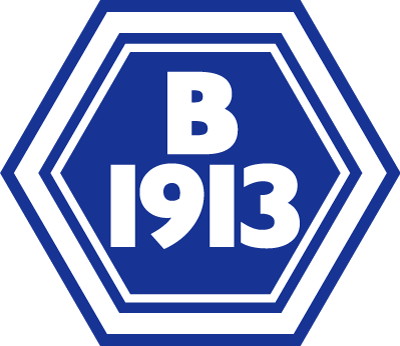
- Full name: Boldklubben 1913
- Founded: 18 November 1913; 112 years ago
- Ground: Campus Road, Odense
- Capacity: 5,000
- Manager: Frank Rust Nielsen
- League: Denmark Series
- 2025–26: Funen Series, 1st of 14 (promoted)
- Website: b1913.dk
| Home colours | Away colours |

Boldklubben 1913 is a Danish football club based in Odense, Denmark. The club plays in the Denmark Series, the non-league fifth tier of the Danish football league system. They play their home matches at the Campus Road Stadium. B1913 spent one season in the 1961–62 European Cup, the club's most notable international appearance.

From the 2006–07 season to the 2012–13 season, B1913 merged with B 1909, and Dalum IF, to form the joint venture FC Fyn. FC Fyn played in both the Danish 1st Division (tier 2) and the Danish 2nd Division (tier 3).

== Players ==
As of 6 September 2026

Note: Flags indicate national team as defined under FIFA eligibility rules; some limited exceptions apply. Players may hold more than one non-FIFA nationality.

| No. | Pos. | Nation | Player |
|---|---|---|---|
| 1 | GK | DEN | Kristoffer Madsen |
| 2 | DF | DEN | Magnus Møller Pedersen |
| 3 | DF | DEN | Marius Seest |
| 6 | DF | DEN | Troels Skræp |
| 7 | FW | DEN | Nicklas Stokholm |
| 9 | FW | DEN | Gustav Haastrup |
| 10 | MF | DEN | Atli Geir Gunnarsson |
| 11 | FW | DEN | Dieudonne Yao |
| 12 | DF | DEN | Oliver Andersen |
| 13 | DF | DEN | Alexander Mygind |
| 14 | MF | DEN | Frederik Paulsen |
| 15 | GK | DEN | Viktor Haastrup |
| 16 | MF | DEN | David Easter (captain) |

| No. | Pos. | Nation | Player |
|---|---|---|---|
| 17 | MF | DEN | Philip Hallundbæk |
| 18 | FW | DEN | Mathias Munch |
| 19 | FW | DEN | Elias Sande-Neset |
| 20 | FW | DEN | Mathias Frederiksen |
| 21 | DF | DEN | Oliver Nielsen |
| 22 | MF | DEN | Hjalde Wilse |
| 23 | DF | DEN | Viktor Hem Harpøth |
| 24 | GK | DEN | Jakob Kruse |
| 25 | DF | DEN | Tobias Holt |
| 27 | FW | DEN | Benjamin Aarenstrup |
| 36 | FW | DEN | Oliver Baltzer |
| 77 | MF | DEN | Aria Kalantary |
| 97 | MF | DEN | Kasper Søby |

== Management ==
=== Coaching ===
As of 6 September 2026

| Role | Staff |
|---|---|
| Head Coach | (Denmark) Frank Rust Nielsen |
| Assistant Coach | (Denmark) Henrik Vingaard |
| Goalkeeping Coach | (Denmark) Niclas Henriksen |
| Team Manager | (Denmark) Mogens Lund Christoffersen |
Medical Staff
| Team Doctor | (Denmark) Torsten Rudbæk |
| Physiotherapist | (Denmark) Rina Østergaard |

== Honours ==
- Danish football championship
  - Runners-up (3): 1923–24, 1962, 1963
- Danish Cup
  - Winners (1): 1962–63
- Provinsmesterskabsturneringen
  - Winners (2): 1924, 1930
- Funen Football Championship
  - Winners (13): 1922–23, 1923–24, 1927–28, 1929–30, 1932–33, 1933–34, 1935–36, 1955–56^{‡}, 1984^{‡}, 1991^{‡}, 2000^{‡}, 2003^{‡}, 2015–16, 2019–20
  - Runners-up (6): 1924–25, 1925–26, 1926–27, 1942–43^{‡}, 1962^{‡}, 2006^{R}
- FBUs Pokalturnering
  - Winners (10): 1925, 1926, 1927, 1932, 1934, 1935, 1937, 1939, 1946, 1952
  - Runners-up (5): 1930, 1936, 1940, 1941, 1951

^{‡} Honour achieved by reserve team
^{R} Status as a reserve team for FC Fyn
