= 2020–21 Danish 2nd Divisions =

Danish 2nd Divisions
- Season: 2020–21

The 2020–21 Danish 2nd Divisions will be divided in two groups of fourteen teams. The top team of each group will be promoted to the 2021–22 Danish 1st Division. This will be the last season with two groups, and after the season the clubs placed 2-6 in each group will qualify for the new Danish tier 3, and teams placed 7-10 in each group will qualify for the new Danish tier 4. The bottom four clubs in each group will be relegated to the Denmark Series.

== Participants ==
Locations of the 2020–21 Danish 2nd Division teams (Group 1 in red, Group 2 in blue). Copenhagen teams: AB Tårnby, Akademisk Boldklub, Avarta, B.93, Brønshøj Boldklub, FA 2000, Frem, HIK, and Vanløse
Roskilde teams: FC Roskilde and KFUM Roskilde

Club	Group	Finishing position last season	First season of current spell in 2nd Divisions
Aarhus Fremad	Group 1	2nd	2015–16
AB Tårnby	Group 2	1st in Denmark Series Group 2	2020–21
Akademisk Boldklub	Group 2	7th	2017–18
Avarta	Group 2	12th	2008–09
B.93	Group 1	13th	2013–14
Brabrand IF	Group 1	4th	2018–19
Brønshøj Boldklub	Group 2	10th	2015–16
Dalum IF	Group 1	18th	2015–16
FA 2000	Group 2	17th	2019–20
FC Roskilde	Group 2	11th in 1st Division	2020–21
FC Sydvest 05	Group 1	19th	2016–17
Frem	Group 1	11th	2012–13
Hillerød	Group 2	14th	2017–18
HIK	Group 2	8th	2008–09
Holbæk	Group 1	16th	2019–20
Holstebro	Group 1	1st in Denmark Series Group 4	2020–21
Jammerbugt FC	Group 1	6th	2012–13
KFUM Roskilde	Group 2	1st in Denmark Series Group 1	2020–21
Middelfart	Group 1	3rd	2012–13
Nykøbing	Group 2	10th in 1st Division	2020–21
Næsby	Group 1	21st	2019–20
Næstved	Group 2	12th in 1st Division	2020–21
SfB-Oure FA	Group 1	1st in Denmark Series Group 3	2020–21
Skovshoved	Group 2	20th	2017–18
Slagelse	Group 2	22nd	2018–19
Thisted FC	Group 1	5th	2019–20
Vanløse	Group 2	9th	2018–19
VSK Aarhus	Group 1	15th	2019–20

== Group 1 ==
=== League table ===
Pos	Team	Pld	W	D	L	GF	GA	GD	Pts	Promotion or Relegation
1	Jammerbugt FC (P)	26	18	6	2	53	24	+29	60	Promotion to 2021–22 Danish 1st Division
2	B.93	26	16	5	5	48	29	+19	53	Qualification to 2021–22 Danish 2nd Division
3	Aarhus Fremad	26	13	7	6	53	35	+18	46	Qualification to 2021–22 Danish 2nd Division
4	Middelfart G&BK	26	14	1	11	47	36	+11	43	Qualification to 2021–22 Danish 2nd Division
5	Thisted FC	26	12	7	7	34	25	+9	43	Qualification to 2021–22 Danish 2nd Division
6	Brabrand IF	26	12	5	9	39	29	+10	41	Qualification to 2021–22 Danish 2nd Division
7	VSK Aarhus	26	10	9	7	33	26	+7	39	Qualification to 2021–22 Danish 3rd Division
8	BK Frem	26	10	9	7	36	31	+5	39	Qualification to 2021–22 Danish 3rd Division
9	Dalum IF	26	9	6	11	33	40	−7	33	Qualification to 2021–22 Danish 3rd Division
10	Næsby BK	26	9	5	12	35	44	−9	32	Qualification to 2021–22 Danish 3rd Division
11	Holbæk B&I (R)	26	8	4	14	35	47	−12	28	Relegation to Denmark Series
12	FC Sydvest 05 (R)	26	6	6	14	30	45	−15	24	Relegation to Denmark Series
13	SfB-Oure FA (R)	26	4	3	19	34	72	−38	15	Relegation to Denmark Series
14	Holstebro BK (R)	26	2	5	19	27	54	−27	11	Relegation to Denmark Series

Updated to match(es) played on 5 June 2021. Source: Danish FA
Rules for classification: 1) points; 2) goal difference; 3) number of goals scored
(P) Promoted; (R) Relegated

== Group 2 ==
=== League table ===
Pos	Team	Pld	W	D	L	GF	GA	GD	Pts	Promotion or Relegation
1	Nykøbing FC (P)	26	19	5	2	60	22	+38	62	Promotion to 2021–22 Danish 1st Division
2	HIK	26	16	5	5	39	25	+14	53	Qualification to 2021–22 Danish 2nd Division
3	AB Gladsaxe	26	15	6	5	44	31	+13	51	Qualification to 2021–22 Danish 2nd Division
4	Næstved BK	26	12	7	7	48	31	+17	43	Qualification to 2021–22 Danish 2nd Division
5	Hillerød Fodbold	26	13	4	9	33	31	+2	43	Qualification to 2021–22 Danish 2nd Division
6	FA 2000	26	11	8	7	29	24	+5	41	Qualification to 2021–22 Danish 2nd Division
7	FC Roskilde	26	12	3	11	39	33	+6	39	Qualification to 2021–22 Danish 3rd Division
8	Vanløse IF	26	9	7	10	31	29	+2	34	Qualification to 2021–22 Danish 3rd Division
9	Slagelse B&I	26	9	5	12	29	33	−4	32	Qualification to 2021–22 Danish 3rd Division
10	KFUM Roskilde	26	7	5	14	31	44	−13	26	Qualification to 2021–22 Danish 3rd Division
11	Skovshoved IF (R)	26	6	6	14	30	43	−13	24	Relegation to Denmark Series
12	BK Avarta (R)	26	6	6	14	25	43	−18	24	Relegation to Denmark Series
13	Brønshøj Boldklub (R)	26	6	5	15	34	50	−16	23	Relegation to Denmark Series
14	AB Tårnby (R)	26	2	6	18	23	56	−33	12	Relegation to Denmark Series

Updated to match(es) played on 5 June 2021. Source: Danish FA
Rules for classification: 1) points; 2) goal difference; 3) number of goals scored
(P) Promoted; (R) Relegated
