= 2019–20 Danish 2nd Divisions =

Danish 2nd Divisions
- Season: 2019–20

The 2019–20 Danish 2nd Divisions was divided in two groups of twelve teams in the autumn. In spring there was a promotion play-off and a relegation play-off. The top team of the promotion play-off group was promoted to the 2020–21 Danish 1st Division.

Due to the COVID-19 pandemic the two divisions were ended after 17 games, and the clubs began a shortened promotion and relegation play-off on 13 June. The number of relegation spots were reduced to two.

== Participants ==
Locations of the 2019–20 Danish 2nd Division teams (Group 1 in red, Group 2 in blue). Copenhagen teams: Akademisk Boldklub, Avarta, B.93, Brønshøj Boldklub, FA 2000, Frem, HIK, and Vanløse

Club	Group	Finishing position last season	First season of current spell in 2nd Divisions
Aarhus Fremad	Group 2	7th	2015–16
Akademisk Boldklub	Group 2	5th	2017–18
Avarta	Group 1	15th	2008–09
B.93	Group 1	8th	2013–14
Brabrand IF	Group 2	3rd	2018–19
Brønshøj Boldklub	Group 1	10th	2015–16
Dalum IF	Group 2	18th	2015–16
FA 2000	Group 1	1st in Denmark Series Group 2	2019–20
FC Helsingør	Group 1	11th in 1st Division	2019–20
FC Sydvest 05	Group 2	19th	2016–17
Frem	Group 1	13th	2012–13
Hillerød	Group 1	14th	2017–18
Holbæk	Group 1	1st in Denmark Series Group 1	2019–20
HIK	Group 1	11th	2008–09
Jammerbugt FC	Group 2	6th	2012–13
Middelfart	Group 2	4th	2012–13
Næsby	Group 2	1st in Denmark Series Group 3	2019–20
Ringkøbing	Group 2	12th	2017–18
Skovshoved	Group 1	20th	2017–18
Slagelse	Group 1	16th	2018–19
Thisted FC	Group 2	12th in 1st Division	2019–20
Vanløse	Group 1	9th	2018–19
Vejgaard	Group 2	17th	2018–19
VSK Aarhus	Group 2	1st in Denmark Series Group 4	2019–20

== Group 1 ==
=== League table ===
Pos	Team	Pld	W	D	L	GF	GA	GD	Pts	Promotion or Relegation
1	FC Helsingør	17	14	2	1	55	14	+41	44	Qualification to Promotion Group
2	Vanløse IF	17	9	3	5	25	18	+7	30	Qualification to Promotion Group
3	Brønshøj Boldklub	17	8	5	4	20	17	+3	29	Qualification to Promotion Group
4	HIK	17	7	6	4	27	20	+7	27	Qualification to Promotion Group
5	BK Frem	17	6	7	4	26	22	+4	25	Qualification to Promotion Group
6	BK Avarta	17	6	6	5	17	16	+1	24	Qualification to Promotion Group
7	B.93	17	4	8	5	17	24	−7	20	Qualification to Relegation Group
8	Hillerød Fodbold	17	6	1	10	21	30	−9	19	Qualification to Relegation Group
9	FA 2000	17	5	4	8	23	33	−10	19	Qualification to Relegation Group
10	Holbæk B&I	17	4	5	8	20	26	−6	17	Qualification to Relegation Group
11	Slagelse B&I	17	3	4	10	16	29	−13	13	Qualification to Relegation Group
12	Skovshoved IF	17	3	3	11	12	30	−18	12	Qualification to Relegation Group

Updated to match(es) played on 8 March 2020. Source: Danish FA
Rules for classification: 1) points; 2) goal difference; 3) number of goals scored

=== Results ===
Home \ Away	HEL	VAN	BRN	HIK	FRE	AVA	B93	FA2	HOL	HIL	SLA	SKO
FC Helsingør	—	6–2			1–1	3–0	5–0	4–0	5–0		5–2	7–0
Vanløse IF		—	0–1	1–0		1–0	1–1		1–0		2–1	2–0
Brønshøj Boldklub	2–1	2–0	—	2–2			1–3	1–0	0–0	2–0		1–0
HIK	1–3	1–2		—		1–1	1–1	2–0		3–1	0–0	2–0
BK Frem		1–1	3–2	1–4	—		0–1		2–0	1–0	1–2	
BK Avarta	1–2	0–3	0–0		0–0	—		1–0	2–2		1–0	2–1
B.93				1–1	0–0	0–2	—	1–1	1–2	1–5	2–1	0–0
FA 2000	1–1	1–3	2–0	1–3	4–4	1–0		—		3–1	5–3	
Holbæk B&I	1–2		1–1	1–2		0–2	3–2	4–0	—	3–1		
Hillerød Fodbold	1–2	0–4	1–1	3–1	1–0	0–3	0–2			—	3–1	
Slagelse B&I	1–3	0–0	0–1		2–3		0–0		1–0	2–1	—	0–2
Skovshoved IF	0–1	2–1	0–2	1–2	0–4	1–1		1–2	2–2	0–1		—

Updated to match(es) played on unknown. Source:
Legend: Blue = home team win; Yellow = draw; Red = away team win.

== Group 2 ==
=== League table ===
Pos	Team	Pld	W	D	L	GF	GA	GD	Pts	Promotion or Relegation
1	Aarhus Fremad	17	12	2	3	33	10	+23	38	Qualification to Promotion Group
2	Middelfart G&BK	17	9	4	4	28	19	+9	31	Qualification to Promotion Group
3	Brabrand IF	17	8	5	4	32	23	+9	29	Qualification to Promotion Group
4	Thisted FC	17	8	4	5	30	25	+5	28	Qualification to Promotion Group
5	AB Gladsaxe	17	8	3	6	33	25	+8	27	Qualification to Promotion Group
6	Jammerbugt FC	17	5	8	4	22	18	+4	23	Qualification to Promotion Group
7	VSK Aarhus	17	7	2	8	23	25	−2	23	Qualification to Relegation Group
8	Dalum IF	17	6	4	7	29	27	+2	22	Qualification to Relegation Group
9	Næsby BK	17	4	6	7	20	27	−7	18	Qualification to Relegation Group
10	FC Sydvest 05	17	5	3	9	22	34	−12	18	Qualification to Relegation Group
11	Ringkøbing IF	17	2	6	9	21	37	−16	12	Qualification to Relegation Group
12	Vejgaard BK	17	2	5	10	19	42	−23	11	Qualification to Relegation Group

Updated to match(es) played on 8 March 2020. Source: Danish FA
Rules for classification: 1) points; 2) goal difference; 3) number of goals scored

=== Results ===
Home \ Away	AAF	MID	ABG	BRA	THI	VSK	DAL	JAM	NSB	SYD	RIN	VEJ
Aarhus Fremad	—	2–0	1–3	4–1	0–0		1–1			1–0	4–0	3–0
Middelfart G&BK		—	1–1	1–1	5–1	2–1		1–1	2–1		1–1	2–0
AB Gladsaxe		2–3	—	2–0	3–2	2–3		0–1	2–0		1–2	
Brabrand IF	1–0	2–0	4–4	—	1–2	1–3		3–1		2–2	2–0	
Thisted FC	3–1		1–4		—	1–4	3–1	0–0		3–0		4–0
VSK Aarhus	0–1		3–0	0–3	1–0	—			0–2	0–3		0–0
Dalum IF		0–1		1–2	2–2		—		0–0	5–1	3–3	3–1
Jammerbugt FC	0–2	0–2	1–1		0–1		3–0	—	3–2	4–0		
Næsby BK	0–3	0–4		0–0	1–1	1–0	1–3	2–2	—			3–3
FC Sydvest 05	0–2	0–1	0–1	1–4			3–2	0–0	3–2	—	3–3	3–1
Ringkøbing IF	1–3				1–3	1–2	1–3	0–0	1–3	2–1	—	1–2
Vejgaard BK	0–3	3–1	1–5	2–2				3–3	0–2			—

Updated to match(es) played on unknown. Source:
Legend: Blue = home team win; Yellow = draw; Red = away team win.

== Promotion Group ==
The top 6 teams from each group will compete for 1 spot in the 2020–21 Danish 1st Division.

Pos	Team	Pld	W	D	L	GF	GA	GD	Pts	Promotion or relegation
1	FC Helsingør (P)	23	17	3	3	64	18	+46	54	Promotion to 2020–21 Danish 1st Division
2	Aarhus Fremad	23	17	3	3	54	12	+42	54	
3	Middelfart G&BK	23	13	4	6	43	29	+14	43	
4	Brabrand IF	23	11	6	6	39	33	+6	39	
5	Thisted FC	23	11	5	7	38	34	+4	38	
6	Jammerbugt FC	23	9	10	4	33	21	+12	37	
7	AB Gladsaxe	23	10	6	7	46	37	+9	36	
8	HIK	23	9	8	6	36	29	+7	35	
9	Vanløse IF	23	10	4	9	31	29	+2	34	
10	Brønshøj Boldklub	23	8	7	8	26	37	−11	31	
11	BK Frem	23	7	8	8	35	39	−4	29	
12	BK Avarta	23	6	7	10	24	30	−6	25	

Updated to match(es) played on 4 July 2020. Source: Danish FA
Rules for classification: 1) points; 2) goal difference; 3) number of goals scored
(P) Promoted

== Relegation Group ==
The bottom 6 teams from each group will compete to avoid the 2 relegations spots to the Denmark Series.

Pos	Team	Pld	W	D	L	GF	GA	GD	Pts	Promotion or relegation
1	B.93	23	9	8	6	35	29	+6	35	
2	Hillerød Fodbold	23	11	2	10	34	32	+2	35	
3	VSK Aarhus	23	9	2	12	27	35	−8	29	
4	Holbæk B&I	23	7	6	10	31	35	−4	27	
5	FA 2000	23	7	6	10	29	41	−12	27	
6	Dalum IF	23	6	8	9	32	34	−2	26	
7	FC Sydvest 05	23	7	4	12	30	42	−12	25	
8	Skovshoved IF	23	6	5	12	20	34	−14	23	
9	Næsby BK	23	5	7	11	25	39	−14	22	
10	Slagelse B&I	23	5	6	12	26	37	−11	21	
11	Vejgaard BK (R)	23	4	6	13	28	54	−26	18	Relegation to Denmark Series
12	Ringkøbing IF (R)	23	3	7	13	28	54	−26	16	Relegation to Denmark Series

Updated to match(es) played on 4 July 2020. Source: Danish FA
Rules for classification: 1) points; 2) goal difference; 3) number of goals scored
(R) Relegated
