= 2018–19 Danish 2nd Divisions =

Danish 2nd Divisions
- Season: 2018–19

The 2018–19 Danish 2nd Divisions was divided in two groups of twelve teams in the autumn of 2018. In the spring of 2019 there was a promotion play-off and a relegation play-off. The top two teams of the promotion play-off group were promoted to the 2019–20 Danish 1st Division.

== Participants ==
Locations of the 2018–19 Danish 2nd Division teams (Group 1 in blue, Group 2 in red). Copenhagen teams: Akademisk Boldklub, Avarta, B.93, Brønshøj Boldklub, Frem, HIK, and Vanløse

Club	Group	Finishing position last season	First season of current spell in 2nd Divisions
Aarhus Fremad	Group 1	15th	2015–16
Akademisk Boldklub	Group 2	14th	2017–18
Avarta	Group 2	11th	2008–09
B.93	Group 2	16th	2013–14
Brabrand IF	Group 1	11th in 1st Division	2018–19
Brønshøj Boldklub	Group 2	18th	2015–16
Dalum IF	Group 1	19th	2015–16
FC Sydvest 05	Group 1	12th	2016–17
Frem	Group 2	9th	2012–13
Hillerød	Group 2	17th	2017–18
HIK	Group 2	13th	2008–09
Jammerbugt FC	Group 1	3rd	2012–13
Kjellerup	Group 1	4th	2016–17
Kolding IF	Group 1	5th	2014–15
Marienlyst	Group 2	7th	2014–15
Middelfart	Group 2	6th	2012–13
Odder	Group 1	20th	2013–14
Ringkøbing	Group 1	10th	2017–18
Skive IK	Group 1	12th in 1st Division	2018–19
Skovshoved	Group 1	8th	2017–18
Slagelse	Group 2	1st in Denmark Series Group 1	2018–19
Tarup-Paarup	Group 1	1st in Denmark Series Group 3	2018–19
Vanløse	Group 2	1st in Denmark Series Group 2	2018–19
Vejgaard	Group 1	1st in Denmark Series Group 4	2018–19

== Group 1 ==
=== League table ===
Pos	Team	Pld	W	D	L	GF	GA	GD	Pts	Promotion or Relegation
1	Skive IK	22	16	2	4	56	27	+29	50	Qualification to Promotion Group
2	Kolding IF	22	13	7	2	46	21	+25	46	Qualification to Promotion Group
3	Brabrand IF	22	13	6	3	37	19	+18	45	Qualification to Promotion Group
4	Jammerbugt FC	22	11	6	5	34	22	+12	39	Qualification to Promotion Group
5	Aarhus Fremad	22	10	8	4	33	20	+13	38	Qualification to Promotion Group
6	Ringkøbing IF	22	10	3	9	27	30	−3	33	Qualification to Promotion Group
7	Vejgaard BK	22	6	7	9	27	36	−9	25	Qualification to Relegation Group
8	Dalum IF	22	5	5	12	22	34	−12	20	Qualification to Relegation Group
9	FC Sydvest 05	22	4	7	11	25	33	−8	19	Qualification to Relegation Group
10	Odder IGF	22	4	7	11	27	42	−15	19	Qualification to Relegation Group
11	Tarup-Paarup IF	22	4	4	14	18	41	−23	16	Qualification to Relegation Group
12	Kjellerup IF	22	2	6	14	24	51	−27	12	Qualification to Relegation Group

Updated to match(es) played on 13 April 2019. Source: Danish FA
Rules for classification: 1) points; 2) goal difference; 3) number of goals scored

== Group 2 ==
=== League table ===
Pos	Team	Pld	W	D	L	GF	GA	GD	Pts	Promotion or Relegation
1	Middelfart G&BK	22	11	7	4	35	21	+14	40	Qualification to Promotion Group
2	AB Gladsaxe	22	11	6	5	36	20	+16	39	Qualification to Promotion Group
3	Brønshøj Boldklub	22	10	6	6	44	32	+12	36	Qualification to Promotion Group
4	B.93	22	11	2	9	39	37	+2	35	Qualification to Promotion Group
5	Vanløse IF	22	8	9	5	31	25	+6	33	Qualification to Promotion Group
6	HIK	22	9	5	8	34	28	+6	32	Qualification to Promotion Group
7	BK Frem	22	8	7	7	18	14	+4	31	Qualification to Relegation Group
8	Slagelse B&I	22	8	6	8	27	27	0	30	Qualification to Relegation Group
9	Hillerød Fodbold	22	8	6	8	32	34	−2	30	Qualification to Relegation Group
10	BK Avarta	22	6	6	10	29	30	−1	24	Qualification to Relegation Group
11	Skovshoved IF	22	5	7	10	22	44	−22	22	Qualification to Relegation Group
12	BK Marienlyst	22	3	1	18	15	50	−35	10	Qualification to Relegation Group

Updated to match(es) played on 13 April 2019. Source: Danish FA
Rules for classification: 1) points; 2) goal difference; 3) number of goals scored

== Promotion Group ==
The top 6 teams from each group will compete for 2 spots in the 2019–20 Danish 1st Division.

Pos	Team	Pld	W	D	L	GF	GA	GD	Pts	Promotion or relegation
1	Skive IK (P)	33	23	3	7	73	37	+36	72	Promotion to 2019–20 Danish 1st Division
2	Kolding IF (P)	33	19	9	5	65	31	+34	66	Promotion to 2019–20 Danish 1st Division
3	Brabrand IF	33	19	8	6	59	34	+25	65	
4	Middelfart G&BK	33	17	10	6	60	33	+27	61	
5	AB Gladsaxe	33	15	9	9	50	31	+19	54	
6	Jammerbugt FC	33	15	9	9	48	41	+7	54	
7	Aarhus Fremad	33	14	11	8	50	37	+13	53	
8	B.93	33	17	2	14	57	49	+8	53	
9	Vanløse IF	33	12	10	11	45	41	+4	46	
10	Brønshøj Boldklub	33	13	6	14	56	61	−5	45	
11	HIK	33	11	10	12	49	49	0	43	
12	Ringkøbing IF	33	12	4	17	37	55	−18	40	

Updated to match(es) played on 15 June 2019. Source: Danish FA
Rules for classification: 1) points; 2) goal difference; 3) number of goals scored
(P) Promoted

== Relegation Group ==
The bottom 6 teams from each group will compete to avoid the 4 relegations spots to the Denmark Series.

Pos	Team	Pld	W	D	L	GF	GA	GD	Pts	Promotion or relegation
1	BK Frem	33	16	7	10	44	30	+14	55	
2	Hillerød Fodbold	33	13	10	10	50	48	+2	49	
3	BK Avarta	33	12	9	12	54	45	+9	45	
4	Slagelse B&I	33	12	8	13	42	40	+2	44	
5	Vejgaard BK	33	11	10	12	44	49	−5	43	
6	Dalum IF	33	10	7	16	43	54	−11	37	
7	FC Sydvest 05	33	9	9	15	44	50	−6	36	
8	Skovshoved IF	33	9	9	15	38	59	−21	36	
9	Odder IGF (R)	33	8	11	14	47	60	−13	35	Relegation to Denmark Series
10	Tarup-Paarup IF (R)	33	8	5	20	34	55	−21	29	Relegation to Denmark Series
11	Kjellerup IF (R)	33	4	7	22	38	82	−44	19	Relegation to Denmark Series
12	BK Marienlyst (R)	33	5	1	27	22	78	−56	16	Relegation to Denmark Series

Updated to match(es) played on 22 June 2019. Source: Danish FA
Rules for classification: 1) points; 2) goal difference; 3) number of goals scored
(R) Relegated
