= 2018–19 Danish 1st Division =

79th season of Danish 1st Division

NordicBet Liga
- Season: 2018–19
- Champions: Silkeborg IF
- Relegated: FC Helsingør; Thisted FC
- Matches: 198
- Goals: 569 (2.87 per match)
- Top goalscorer: Ronnie Schwartz (17 goals)
- Biggest home win: Silkeborg IF 5–0 Thisted FC (8 May 2019)
- Biggest away win: FC Fredericia 1–7 FC Roskilde (4 November 2018)
- Highest scoring: FC Fredericia 1–7 FC Roskilde (4 November 2018)
- Highest attendance: 9,117; Silkeborg IF 2–2 Viborg FF (14 May 2019)
- Lowest attendance: 402; Thisted FC 0–0 Hvidovre IF (31 March 2019)

The 2018–19 Danish 1st Division (known as the NordicBet Liga due to sponsorship by NordicBet) marked the 23rd season of the league operating as the second tier of Danish football and the 79th season overall under the 1st Division name. The league is governed by the Danish Football Association (DBU).

The division-champion will be promoted to the 2019–20 Danish Superliga, while the runners-up and the third placed team will face promotion playoffs. The teams in 11th and 12th places are relegated to the 2019–20 Danish 2nd Divisions.

== Participants ==
FC Helsingør finished last in the 2017–18 Danish Superliga relegation play-off and were relegated to the 1st Division after only one season in the first tier. Silkeborg IF lost to Esbjerg fB and Lyngby Boldklub lost to Vendsyssel FF in the relegation play off and were relegated as well. Vejle Boldklub, Esbjerg fB and Vendsyssel FF were promoted to the 2018–19 Danish Superliga.

Brabrand IF and Skive IK were relegated to the 2018–19 Danish 2nd Divisions. Brabrand IF was relegated immediately after just one season at the second tier while Skive IK lasted four seasons in the league. Hvidovre IF and Næstved Boldklub won promotion from the 2017–18 Danish 2nd Divisions. Hvidovre will play at the 1st Division for the first time since 2013–14 season, where as Næstved won promotion after only one season's absence.

=== Stadia and locations ===
Locations of the 2018–19 Danish 1st Division teams.

Club	Location	Stadium	Turf	Capacity	2017–18 position
FC Fredericia	Fredericia	Monjasa Park	Natural	4,000	6th
FC Helsingør	Helsingør	Helsingør Stadion	Natural	4,500	Superliga, 14th
FC Roskilde	Roskilde	Roskilde Idrætspark	Natural	6,000	10th
BK Fremad Amager	Copenhagen	Sundby Idrætspark	Artificial	7,200	9th
HB Køge	Herfølge/Køge	Capelli Sport Stadion (Herfølge, until 2018) (Note: HB Køge played their home matches in the fall season of 2018 at Herfølge Stadium at Herfølge, but switched to their future home ground, a newly constructed stadium locayed in Kæge (Køge Idrætspark), in the spring season of 2019.); Capelli Sport Stadion (Køge, from 2019)	Natural; Artificial	8,000; 4,000	5th
Hvidovre IF	Hvidovre	Kæmpernes Arena	Natural	12,000	2D, 1st
Lyngby BK	Kongens Lyngby	Lyngby Stadion	Natural	8,000	Superliga, 12th
Nykøbing FC	Nykøbing Falster	CM Arena	Natural	10,000	7th
Næstved BK	Næstved	ProfaGroupPark	Natural	7,500	2D, 2nd
Silkeborg IF	Silkeborg	JYSK Park	Artificial	10,000	Superliga, 13th
Thisted FC	Thisted	Sparekassen Thy Arena	Natural	3,000	8th
Viborg FF	Viborg	Energi Viborg Arena	Natural	9,566	4th

=== Personnel and sponsoring ===
Note: Flags indicate national team as has been defined under FIFA eligibility rules. Players and Managers may hold more than one non-FIFA nationality.

Team	Head coach	Captain	Kit manufacturer	Shirt sponsor
FC Fredericia	(Denmark) Jonas Dal	(Denmark) Christian Ege Nielsen	Hummel	Monjasa
FC Helsingør	(United States) Omid Namazi	(Denmark) Andreas Holm Jensen	Diadora	Spar Nord
FC Roskilde	(Denmark) Peter Foldgast (interim) (Note: On 14 May 2019 Roskilde manager Christian Lønstrup was temporarily suspended until the end of season due to accusing some of the players of being involved in match-fixing.)	(Denmark) Stefan Hansen	Puma	CP ApS
Fremad Amager	(Bosnia and Herzegovina) Azrudin Valentić	(Denmark) Mike Mortensen	Adidas	HC Container
HB Køge	(Denmark) Morten Karlsen	(Denmark) Henrik Madsen	Capelli	Castus
Hvidovre IF	(Denmark) Per Frandsen	(Denmark) Frederik Krabbe	Nike	KBS Byg
Lyngby BK	(Denmark) Christian Nielsen	(Denmark) Martin Ørnskov	Adidas	Jönsson A/S
Nykøbing FC	(Denmark) Jens Olsen	(Denmark) Lars Pleidrup	Nike	Jyske Bank
Næstved BK	(Denmark) Michael Hemmingsen	(Denmark) Kristoffer Munksgaard	Joma	Sydbank
Silkeborg IF	(Denmark) Michael Hansen	(Denmark) Simon Jakobsen	Uhlsport	Mascot International
Thisted FC	(Denmark) Bo Thomsen	(Denmark) Mathias Pedersen	Puma	Sparekassen Thy
Viborg FF	(Denmark) Steffen Højer	(Denmark) Jeppe Grønning	Nike	Andelskassen

=== Managerial changes ===
Team	Outgoing manager	Manner of departure	Date of vacancy	Replaced by	Date of appointment	Position in table
Thisted FC	(Denmark) Henning Pedersen	End of tenure as caretaker	20 May 2018	(Denmark) Bo Thomsen	1 July 2018	Pre-Season
HB Køge	(Denmark) Henrik Lehm	Resigned	23 May 2018	(Denmark) Morten Karlsen	1 June 2018	Pre-Season
FC Fredericia	(Denmark) Jesper Sørensen	End of contract	30 June 2018	(Denmark) Jonas Dal	1 July 2018	Pre-Season
Fremad Amager	(Denmark) John Jensen	End of contract	30 June 2018	(Denmark) Jan Michaelsen	1 July 2018	Pre-Season
Lyngby BK	(Denmark) Thomas Nørgaard	Sacked	14 June 2018	(Denmark) Mark Strudal	1 July 2018	Pre-Season
Silkeborg IF	(Denmark) Peter Sørensen	Sacked	14 August 2018	(Denmark) Michael Hansen	15 August 2018	11th
FC Helsingør	(Denmark) Christian Lønstrup	Resigned	24 August 2018	(Denmark) Peter Feher	10 September 2018	8th
FC Roskilde	(Denmark) Rasmus Monnerup	Sacked	2 September 2018	(Denmark) Christian Lønstrup	10 September 2018	12th
Fremad Amager	(Denmark) Jan Michaelsen	Mutual consent	30 October 2018	(Bosnia and Herzegovina) Azrudin Valentić	31 October 2018	8th
Lyngby BK	(Denmark) Mark Strudal	Sacked	28 November 2018	(Denmark) Christian Nielsen	28 November 2018	8th
FC Helsingør	(Denmark) Peter Feher	Sacked	22 April 2019	(United States) Omid Namazi	22 April 2019	11th
FC Roskilde	(Denmark) Christian Lønstrup	Temporarily suspended	14 May 2018	(Denmark) Peter Foldgast (interim)	10 September 2018	10th

== League table ==
Pos	Team	Pld	W	D	L	GF	GA	GD	Pts	Promotion or Relegation
1	Silkeborg IF (P, C)	33	18	7	8	60	41	+19	61	Promotion to Danish Superliga
2	Viborg FF	33	17	9	7	61	37	+24	60	Qualification to Promotion play-offs
3	Lyngby BK (P)	33	15	7	11	51	47	+4	52	Qualification to Promotion play-offs
4	Næstved BK	33	13	11	9	43	40	+3	50	
5	Fremad Amager	33	13	11	9	42	45	−3	50	
6	FC Fredericia	33	14	5	14	51	47	+4	47	
7	HB Køge	33	12	9	12	51	47	+4	45	
8	Nykøbing FC	33	12	9	12	44	47	−3	45	
9	FC Roskilde	33	9	8	16	57	66	−9	35	
10	Hvidovre IF	33	9	8	16	39	49	−10	35	
11	FC Helsingør (R)	33	6	13	14	35	43	−8	31	Relegation to Danish 2nd Division
12	Thisted FC (R)	33	7	9	17	35	61	−26	30	Relegation to Danish 2nd Division

Source: Danish FA
Rules for classification: 1) points; 2) goal difference; 3) number of goals scored
(C) Champions; (P) Promoted; (R) Relegated

== Play-offs ==
=== Relegation play-offs ===
Matches

12 May 2019

Vendsyssel	0–1	Horsens
	Report	Brock-Madsen 76'

Nord Energi Arena, Hjørring
Attendance: 2,134
Referee: Jens Maae
19 May 2019

Horsens	1–1	Vendsyssel
Lumb 36'	Report	Henriksen 83'

CASA Arena Horsens, Horsens
Attendance: 5,517
Referee: Michael Tykgaard

Horsens won 2–1 on aggregate.

12 May 2019

Hobro	0–1	Vejle Boldklub
	Report	Finnbogason 24'

DS Arena, Hobro
Attendance: 3,326
Referee: Jakob Kehlet
19 May 2019

Vejle Boldklub	0–2 (a.e.t.)	Hobro
	Report	Hammershøy-Mistrati 14'; Sabbi 103'

Vejle Stadion, Vejle
Attendance: 9,142
Referee: Morten Krogh

Hobro won 2–1 on aggregate.

=== Promotion play-offs ===
Matches

30 May 2019

Lyngby BK	2–1	Vendsyssel FF
Gytkjær 9'; Fosgaard 31'	Report	Kamara 11'

Lyngby Stadion, Lyngby
Attendance: 4,832
Referee: Morten Krogh
2 June 2019

Vendsyssel FF	2–2	Lyngby BK
Þorsteinsson 67' (pen.); Konaté 85'	Report	Kjær 11'; Mohammad 52'

Nord Energi Arena, Hjørring
Referee: Morten Krogh

Lyngby won 4–3 on aggregate and promoted to 2019–20 Danish Superliga

30 May 2019

Hobro	1–0	Viborg
Sabbi 30'	Report

DS Arena, Hobro
Attendance: 5,674
Referee: Jens Maae
2 June 2019

Viborg	0–2	Hobro
	Report	Hammershøy-Mistrati 1'; Sabbi 22'

Energi Viborg Arena, Viborg
Attendance: 8,153
Referee: Jens Maae

Hobro won 3–0 on aggregate and stayed in the Danish Superliga

== Top goalscorers ==
As of 5 May 2019

Rank	Player	Club	Goals
1	(Denmark) Ronnie Schwartz	Silkeborg	17
1	(Denmark) Emil Nielsen	Roskilde	17
3	(Denmark) Martin Koch Helsted	HB Køge	16
4	(Finland) Sakari Tukiainen	Thisted	13
5	(Denmark) Jakob Johansson	HB Køge	12
6	(Faroe Islands) Finnur Justinussen	Næstved BK	11
7	(Denmark) Christian Sørensen	Fredericia	10
8	(Denmark) Jeppe Kjær	Lyngby BK	9
8	(Denmark) Andreas Albers	Viborg	9
10	(Denmark) Nicolaj Agger	Hvidovre	8
10	(Denmark) Joachim Wagner	Nykøbing	8
10	(Denmark) Kim Aabech	Hvidovre	8
