= 2017–18 Danish 2nd Divisions =

Danish 2nd Divisions
- Season: 2017–18

The 2017–18 Danish 2nd Divisions will be divided in three groups of eight teams in the autumn. In spring there will be a promotion play-off and a relegation play-off. The top two teams of the promotion play-off group will be promoted to the 2018–19 Danish 1st Division.

== Participants ==
Locations of the 2017–18 Danish 2nd Division teams (Group 1 in red, Group 2 in green, Group 3 in blue). Copenhagen teams: Akademisk Boldklub, Avarta, B.93, Brønshøj Boldklub, Frem, HIK, and Hvidovre

Club	Group	Finishing position last season	First season of current spell in 2nd Divisions
Aarhus Fremad	Group 3	9th	2015–16
Akademisk Boldklub	Group 1	12th in 1st Division	2017–18
Avarta	Group 2	4th	2008–09
B.93	Group 1	5th	2013–14
Brønshøj Boldklub	Group 1	7th	2015–16
Dalum IF	Group 2	11th	2015–16
FC Sydvest 05	Group 3	16th	2016–17
Frem	Group 1	14th	2012–13
Greve	Group 2	12th	2016–17
Hillerød	Group 1	1st in Denmark Series Group 1	2017–18
HIK	Group 2	19th	2008–09
Hvidovre	Group 1	10th	2014–15
Jammerbugt FC	Group 3	20th	2012–13
Kjellerup	Group 3	6th	2016–17
Kolding IF	Group 2	3rd	2014–15
Lyseng	Group 3	1st in Denmark Series Group 4	2017–18
Marienlyst	Group 2	8th	2014–15
Middelfart	Group 2	13th	2012–13
Næsby	Group 2	15th	2004–05
Næstved	Group 1	11th in 1st Division	2017–18
Odder	Group 3	18th	2013–14
Ringkøbing	Group 3	1st in Denmark Series Group 3	2017–18
Skovshoved	Group 1	1st in Denmark Series Group 2	2017–18
VSK Aarhus	Group 3	17th	2010–11

== Group 1 ==
=== League table ===
Pos	Team	Pld	W	D	L	GF	GA	GD	Pts	Promotion or Relegation
1	Hvidovre IF	14	11	2	1	40	15	+25	35	Qualification to Promotion Group
2	Næstved BK	14	7	3	4	26	20	+6	24	Qualification to Promotion Group
3	Skovshoved IF	14	6	3	5	28	25	+3	21	Qualification to Promotion Group
4	BK Frem	14	5	5	4	29	26	+3	20	Qualification to Promotion Group
5	B.93	14	5	3	6	24	26	−2	18	Qualification to Relegation Group
6	AB Gladsaxe	14	3	5	6	21	23	−2	14	Qualification to Relegation Group
7	Brønshøj Boldklub	14	4	1	9	14	30	−16	13	Qualification to Relegation Group
8	Hillerød Fodbold	14	2	4	8	18	35	−17	10	Qualification to Relegation Group

Updated to match(es) played on 4 November 2017. Source: Danish FA
Rules for classification: 1) points; 2) goal difference; 3) number of goals scored

== Group 2 ==
=== League table ===
Pos	Team	Pld	W	D	L	GF	GA	GD	Pts	Promotion or Relegation
1	Middelfart G&BK	14	8	1	5	28	18	+10	25	Qualification to Promotion Group
2	BK Avarta	14	7	4	3	28	21	+7	25	Qualification to Promotion Group
3	BK Marienlyst	14	7	3	4	25	16	+9	24	Qualification to Promotion Group
4	Kolding IF	14	7	3	4	20	18	+2	24	Qualification to Promotion Group
5	HIK	14	7	3	4	26	25	+1	24	Qualification to Relegation Group
6	Dalum IF	14	5	2	7	24	23	+1	17	Qualification to Relegation Group
7	Greve Fodbold	14	4	4	6	22	27	−5	16	Qualification to Relegation Group
8	Næsby BK	14	0	2	12	13	38	−25	2	Qualification to Relegation Group

Updated to match(es) played on 4 November 2017. Source: Danish FA
Rules for classification: 1) points; 2) goal difference; 3) number of goals scored

== Group 3 ==
=== League table ===
Pos	Team	Pld	W	D	L	GF	GA	GD	Pts	Promotion or Relegation
1	Jammerbugt FC	14	9	2	3	27	15	+12	29	Qualification to Promotion Group
2	FC Sydvest 05	14	7	4	3	30	23	+7	25	Qualification to Promotion Group
3	Kjellerup IF	14	7	3	4	21	15	+6	24	Qualification to Promotion Group
4	Ringkøbing IF	14	6	3	5	24	23	+1	21	Qualification to Promotion Group
5	Aarhus Fremad	14	5	3	6	15	17	−2	18	Qualification to Relegation Group
6	VSK Aarhus	14	4	2	8	22	27	−5	14	Qualification to Relegation Group
7	IF Lyseng	14	3	4	7	16	24	−8	13	Qualification to Relegation Group
8	Odder IGF (Note: Odder IGF was deducted six points for paying salaries to amateur players.)	14	4	1	9	21	32	−11	7	Qualification to Relegation Group

Updated to match(es) played on 4 November 2017. Source: Danish FA
Rules for classification: 1) points; 2) goal difference; 3) number of goals scored

== Promotion Group ==
The top 4 teams from each group will compete for 2 spots in the 2018–19 Danish 1st Division. The points and goals that the teams won in the autumn group against other participants in the promotion group was transferred to the promotion group.

Pos	Team	Pld	W	D	L	GF	GA	GD	Pts	Promotion or relegation
1	Hvidovre IF (P)	22	17	3	2	62	18	+44	54	Promotion to 2018–19 Danish 1st Division
2	Næstved BK (P)	22	14	4	4	41	21	+20	46	Promotion to 2018–19 Danish 1st Division
3	Jammerbugt FC	22	11	5	6	35	26	+9	38	
4	Kjellerup IF	22	10	4	8	33	35	−2	34	
5	Kolding IF	22	9	6	7	28	28	0	33	
6	Middelfart G&BK	22	8	6	8	38	36	+2	30	
7	BK Marienlyst	22	8	3	11	32	46	−14	27	
8	Skovshoved IF	22	8	2	12	34	37	−3	26	
9	BK Frem	22	7	4	11	29	30	−1	25	
10	Ringkøbing IF	22	6	4	12	33	47	−14	22	
11	BK Avarta	22	5	6	11	32	44	−12	21	
12	FC Sydvest 05	22	3	5	14	20	49	−29	14	

Updated to match(es) played on 9 June 2018. Source: Danish FA
Rules for classification: 1) points; 2) goal difference; 3) number of goals scored
(P) Promoted

== Relegation Group ==
The bottom 4 teams from each group will compete to avoid the 4 relegations spots to the Denmark Series. The points and goals that the teams won in the autumn group against other participants in the relegation group was transferred to the relegation group.

Pos	Team	Pld	W	D	L	GF	GA	GD	Pts	Promotion or relegation
1	HIK	22	16	3	3	55	33	+22	51	
2	AB Gladsaxe	22	10	8	4	36	22	+14	38	
3	Aarhus Fremad	22	11	4	7	34	29	+5	37	
4	B.93	22	10	5	7	40	30	+10	35	
5	Hillerød Fodbold	22	11	1	10	47	40	+7	34	
6	Brønshøj Boldklub	22	8	8	6	41	30	+11	32	
7	Dalum IF	22	9	3	10	33	35	−2	30	
8	Odder IGF	22	8	6	8	33	40	−7	30	
9	Greve Fodbold (R)	22	7	7	8	41	47	−6	28	Relegation to Denmark Series
10	Næsby BK (R)	22	8	3	11	45	46	−1	27	Relegation to Denmark Series
11	VSK Aarhus (R)	22	6	4	12	36	45	−9	22	Relegation to Denmark Series
12	IF Lyseng (R)	22	1	2	19	12	56	−44	5	Relegation to Denmark Series

Updated to match(es) played on 16 June 2018. Source: Danish FA
Rules for classification: 1) points; 2) goal difference; 3) number of goals scored
(R) Relegated
