= 2012–13 in Danish football =

Football in Denmark
- Season: 2012–13

Men's football
- Superliga: Copenhagen
- 1st Division: Viborg FF
- Danish Cup: Esbjerg fB

Women's football
- Elite Division: Brøndby
- 1st Division: KoldingQ
- Danish Cup: Brøndby

The 2012–13 in Danish football season was the 123rd edition of competitive football in Denmark.

== Domestic leagues ==
=== Men's football ===
==== Superliga ====
The 23rd edition of the Danish Superliga began on 13 July 2012 and ended on 20 May 2013.

Pos	Team	Pld	W	D	L	GF	GA	GD	Pts	Qualification or relegation
1	Copenhagen (C)	33	18	11	4	62	32	+30	65	Qualification for the Champions League group stage
2	Nordsjælland	33	17	9	7	60	37	+23	60	Qualification for the Champions League third qualifying round
3	Randers FC	33	15	7	11	36	42	−6	52	Qualification for the Europa League third qualifying round
4	Esbjerg fB	33	13	8	12	38	32	+6	47	Qualification for the Europa League play-off round
5	AaB	33	13	8	12	51	46	+5	47	Qualification for the Europa League second qualifying round
6	Midtjylland	33	12	11	10	51	47	+4	47	
7	AGF	33	11	8	14	50	49	+1	41	
8	SønderjyskE	33	12	5	16	53	57	−4	41	
9	Brøndby	33	9	12	12	39	45	−6	39	
10	OB	33	10	8	15	52	59	−7	38	
11	Horsens (R)	33	8	10	15	31	49	−18	34	Relegation to Danish 1st Division
12	Silkeborg IF (R)	33	8	7	18	38	66	−28	31	Relegation to Danish 1st Division

Source: Danish Football Association (in Danish)
Rules for classification: 1) points; 2) goal difference; 3) number of goals scored.
(C) Champions; (R) Relegated

==== First Division ====
Pos	Team	Pld	W	D	L	GF	GA	GD	Pts	Promotion or relegation
1	Viborg FF (C, P)	33	17	11	5	60	30	+30	62	Promotion to Danish Superliga
2	Vestsjælland (P)	33	17	11	5	39	27	+12	62	Promotion to Danish Superliga
3	Vejle Kolding	33	16	10	7	46	29	+17	58	
4	Lyngby Boldklub	33	17	5	11	55	42	+13	56	
5	Fredericia	33	11	11	11	53	48	+5	44	
6	HB Køge	33	12	8	13	39	45	−6	44	
7	Hjørring (Note: On 5 May 2013 FC Hjørring was denied licence renewal because the club failed to meet the economic requirements. The Danish FA decided that the club would be relegated to second division at the end of the season. The decision was appealed by the club and since the club was able to raise the necessary money, the decision was reversed and the club was allowed to stay in the league.)	33	10	10	13	38	41	−3	40	
8	Brønshøj (Note: On 30 April Brønshøj was docked six point due to irregularities with player contracts.)	33	12	9	12	41	36	+5	39	
9	Hobro	33	9	11	13	37	43	−6	38	
10	AB Gladsaxe	33	8	13	12	33	34	−1	37	
11	Skive IK (R)	33	10	7	16	47	55	−8	37	Relegation to Danish 2nd Divisions
12	Fyn (Note: On 1 February 2013 FC Fyn went bankrupt. They were docked three points for going into administration and later the team dissolved itself and withdrew from the tournament. With that they lost their remaining matches 3-0. The licence was relegated to Funen Series and used by Boldklubben 1913 in the following season.) (D, R)	33	2	8	23	26	84	−58	11	Relegation to Funen Series

Source: Danish Football Association
Rules for classification: 1) points; 2) goal difference; 3) number of goals scored.
(C) Champions; (D) Disqualified; (P) Promoted; (R) Relegated

==== 2nd Divisions ====
East
Pos	Team	Pld	W	D	L	GF	GA	GD	Pts	Promotion or relegation
1	Hvidovre IF (P)	30	22	3	5	85	31	+54	69	Promotion to Danish 1st Division
2	Helsingør	30	20	4	6	79	38	+41	64	
3	Rishøj BK	30	18	6	6	50	29	+21	60	
4	Næstved BK	30	17	8	5	64	32	+32	59	
5	HIK	30	15	6	9	58	46	+12	51	
6	B 1908	30	13	12	5	46	41	+5	51	
7	Frem	30	14	6	10	45	40	+5	48	
8	FC Roskilde	30	13	7	10	52	41	+11	46	
9	Nordvest FC	30	12	8	10	51	49	+2	44	
10	LFA	30	10	6	14	48	59	−11	36	
11	Avarta	30	9	6	15	39	47	−8	33	
12	Svebølle B&I	30	8	7	15	37	61	−24	31	
13	IF Skjold Birkerød	30	8	5	17	44	65	−21	29	
14	Fremad Amager (O)	30	6	5	19	39	59	−20	23	Qualification to Play-offs
15	Herlev (R)	30	5	6	19	27	67	−40	21	Relegation to Denmark Series
16	NB Bornholm (R)	30	1	3	26	14	73	−59	6	Relegation to Denmark Series

Updated to match(es) played on 23 June 2013. Source: Danish FA
Rules for classification: 1) points; 2) goal difference; 3) number of goals scored.
(O) Play-off winners; (P) Promoted; (R) Relegated

West
Pos	Team	Pld	W	D	L	GF	GA	GD	Pts	Promotion or relegation
1	Marienlyst (P)	30	21	5	4	81	45	+36	68	Promotion to Danish 1st Division
2	Aarhus Fremad	30	18	7	5	63	17	+46	61	
3	Brabrand	30	15	8	7	51	40	+11	53	
4	Blokhus	30	14	8	8	56	44	+12	50	
5	FC Svendborg	30	14	6	10	54	45	+9	48	
6	Næsby BK	30	12	10	8	62	52	+10	46	
7	Middelfart G&BK	30	11	8	11	45	38	+7	41	
8	Thisted FC	30	11	8	11	51	49	+2	41	
9	FC Skanderborg	30	12	5	13	60	60	0	41	
10	Skovbakken IK	30	9	10	11	45	51	−6	37	
11	Søllerød-Vedbæk	30	10	6	14	49	58	−9	36	
12	FC Sydvest 05	30	9	6	15	44	59	−15	33	
13	Ringkøbing IF	30	8	7	15	47	61	−14	31	
14	Kjellerup (R)	30	8	6	16	39	60	−21	30	Qualification to Play-offs
15	Otterup B&I (R)	30	7	8	15	47	73	−26	29	Relegation to Denmark Series
16	Varde IF (R)	30	2	10	18	35	77	−42	16	Relegation to Denmark Series

Updated to match(es) played on 23 June 2013. Source: Danish FA
Rules for classification: 1) points; 2) goal difference; 3) number of goals scored.
(P) Promoted; (R) Relegated

=== Women's football ===
For the championship play-offs, the points of the regular season are halved, rounded up and carried over.

Pos	Team	Pld	W	D	L	GF	GA	GD	Pts	Qualification
1	Brøndby (C)	6	5	1	0	29	3	+26	43	Champions League QR
2	Fortuna Hjørring	6	4	1	1	11	8	+3	36	Champions League QR
3	OB	6	0	2	4	3	15	−12	17	
4	Skovbakken	6	0	2	4	1	18	−17	16	

Source: Danish Football Association
Rules for classification: 1) Points; 2) Goal difference; 3) Number of goals scored; 4) Head-to-head points; 5) Head-to-head goal difference; 6) Head-to-head away goals scored
(C) Champions

==== Results ====
Home \ Away	BRØ	HJØ	ODE	IKS
Brøndby		6–1	2–0	6–0
Fortuna Hjørring	1–1		2–1	2–0
OB	1–6	0–4		1–1
Skovbakken	0–8	0–1	0–0	

Source: DBU.dk
Legend: Blue = home team win; Yellow = draw; Red = away team win.

Pos	Team	Pld	W	D	L	GF	GA	GD	Pts	Qualification
1	Brøndby	18	18	0	0	78	11	+67	54	Championship play-offs
2	Fortuna Hjørring	18	15	1	2	72	10	+62	46	Championship play-offs
3	OB	18	9	2	7	25	31	−6	29	Championship play-offs
4	Skovbakken	18	8	3	7	26	28	−2	27	Championship play-offs
5	KoldingQ	18	7	1	10	33	36	−3	22	Qualification play-offs
6	Taastrup	18	6	2	10	24	46	−22	20	Qualification play-offs
7	BSF	18	6	1	11	35	43	−8	19	Qualification play-offs
8	B.93/HIK/Skjold	18	4	6	8	32	45	−13	18	Qualification play-offs
9	B 1913	18	5	1	12	21	56	−35	16	Qualification play-offs
10	Vejle	18	2	3	13	13	53	−40	9	Qualification play-offs

Source: Danish Football Association (in Danish)
Rules for classification: 1) Points; 2) Goal difference; 3) Goals scored; 4) Away goals scored; 5) Play-off (played on neutral ground if determining teams for different rounds); 6) Draw.

== Domestic cups ==
The Cup was scheduled to play its first round matches on 14–16 August 2012 and hold its final on 9 May.

== International club competitions ==
=== Champions League ===
==== Group E ====
Pos	Team	Pld	W	D	L	GF	GA	GD	Pts	Qualification	JUV	SHK	CHE	NOR
1	(Italy) Juventus	6	3	3	0	12	4	+8	12	Advance to knockout phase	—	1–1	3–0	4–0
2	(Ukraine) Shakhtar Donetsk	6	3	1	2	12	8	+4	10 (Note: Tied on head-to-head points (3) and head-to-head goal difference (0). Head-to-head away goals: Shakhtar Donetsk 2, Chelsea 1.)	Advance to knockout phase	0–1	—	2–1	2–0
3	(England) Chelsea	6	3	1	2	16	10	+6	10	Transfer to Europa League	2–2	3–2	—	6–1
4	(Denmark) Nordsjælland	6	0	1	5	4	22	−18	1		1–1	2–5	0–4	—

Source: Soccerway
Notes:

19 September 2012	Shakhtar Donetsk (Ukraine)	2 – 0	Nordsjælland (Denmark)	Ukraine
20:45 BST				Stadium: Donbas Arena; Attendance: 45,816; Referee: Paweł Gil (Poland)

2 October 2012	Nordsjælland (Denmark)	0 – 4	Chelsea (England)	Copenhagen
20:45 BST			Mata 33', 82'; Luiz 79'; Ramires 89'	Stadium: Parken Stadium; Attendance: 25,120; Referee: Marijo Strahonja (Croatia)

23 October 2012	Nordsjælland (Denmark)	1 – 1	Juventus (Italy)	Copenhagen
20:45 BST	Beckmann 50'		Mirko Vučinić 81'	Attendance: 22,404; Referee: Deniz Aytekin (Germany)

7 November 2012	Juventus (Italy)	4 - 0	Nordsjælland (Denmark)	Turin
20:45 BST	Marchisio 6'; Vidal 23'; Giovinco 37'; Quagliarella 75'			Stadium: Juventus Stadium; Attendance: 27,789; Referee: Aleksandar Stavrev (Macedonia)

20 November 2012 5	Nordsjælland (Denmark)	2 – 5	(Ukraine) Shakhtar Donetsk	Copenhagen^{1}, Denmark
21:45 EET (UTC+2)	Nordstrand 24'; Lorentzen 29'	Report	Luiz Adriano 26', 53', 81'; Willian 44', 50'	Stadium: Parken Stadium; Attendance: 17,054; Referee: Antony Gautier (France)

5 December 2012 6	Chelsea (England)	6 – 1	(Denmark) Nordsjælland	London
20:45 GMT	Luiz (pen.), 38'; Torres 45', 56'; Cahill 51'; Mata 63'; Oscar 71'		John 46'	Stadium: Stamford Bridge; Attendance: 40,084; Referee: Bas Nijhuis (Netherlands)

=== Europa League ===
==== Group E ====
Pos	Team	Pld	W	D	L	GF	GA	GD	Pts	Qualification	STE	STU	COP	MOL
1	(Romania) Steaua București	6	3	2	1	9	9	0	11	Advance to knockout phase	—	1–5	1–0	2–0
2	(Germany) VfB Stuttgart	6	2	2	2	9	6	+3	8 (Note: Head-to-head points: VfB Stuttgart 4, Copenhagen 1.)	Advance to knockout phase	2–2	—	0–0	0–1
3	(Denmark) Copenhagen	6	2	2	2	5	6	−1	8		1–1	0–2	—	2–1
4	(Norway) Molde	6	2	0	4	6	8	−2	6		1–2	2–0	1–2	—

Source: Soccerway
Notes:

20 September 2012 1	Copenhagen (Denmark)	2 - 1	Molde (Norway)	Copenhagen
19:00	Claudemir 20'; Cornelius 74'		Diouf 45+1'	Stadium: Parken Stadium; Attendance: 11,633; Referee: Antti Munukka (Finland)

4 October 2012 2	Steaua București (Romania)	1 - 0	Copenhagen (Denmark)	Arena Națională
21:05	Sigurðsson 83' (o.g.)			Stadium: Bucharest; Attendance: 48,694; Referee: Antonio Damato (Italy)

25 October 2012 3	Stuttgart (Germany)	0 - 0	Copenhagen (Denmark)	Mercedes-Benz Arena
21:05				Stadium: Stuttgart; Attendance: 15,300; Referee: Antonio Damato (Portugal)

8 November 2012 4	Copenhagen (Denmark)	0 - 2	Stuttgart (Germany)	Parken Stadium
19:00			Ibišević 76'; Harnik	Stadium: Copenhagen; Attendance: 24,681; Referee: Craig Thomson (Scotland)

22 November 2012 5	Molde (Norway)	1 - 2	Copenhagen (Denmark)	Aker Stadion
19:00	Chima 62'		Santin 21' (pen.); Gíslason	Stadium: Molde; Attendance: 5,740; Referee: Michael Oliver (England)

6 December 2012 6	Copenhagen (Denmark)	1 - 1	Steaua București (Romania)	Parken Stadium
19:00	Vetokele 87'		Rusescu 72'	Stadium: Copenhagen; Attendance: 15,487; Referee: Hüseyin Göçek (Turkey)

== National teams ==
=== Men's senior ===
Pos	Team	Pld	W	D	L	GF	GA	GD	Pts	Qualification	Italy national football team	Denmark national football team	Czech Republic national football team	Bulgaria national football team	Armenia national football team	Malta national football team
1	Italy	10	6	4	0	19	9	+10	22	Qualification to 2014 FIFA World Cup	—	3–1	2–1	1–0	2–2	2–0
2	Denmark	10	4	4	2	17	12	+5	16		2–2	—	0–0	1–1	0–4	6–0
3	Czech Republic	10	4	3	3	13	9	+4	15		0–0	0–3	—	0–0	1–2	3–1
4	Bulgaria	10	3	4	3	14	9	+5	13		2–2	1–1	0–1	—	1–0	6–0
5	Armenia	10	4	1	5	12	13	−1	13		1–3	0–1	0–3	2–1	—	0–1
6	Malta	10	1	0	9	5	28	−23	3		0–2	1–2	1–4	1–2	0–1	—
