= 2014–15 Danish 2nd Divisions =

Danish 2nd Divisions
- Season: 2014–15

The 2014–15 Danish 2nd Divisions will be the divided in two groups of sixteen teams. The two group winners will be promoted to the 2015–16 Danish 1st Division.

Following the season the league will be reduced from 32 to 24 participants. This means that 11 teams will be relegated.

Because of an uneven distribution of West and East-teams (divided by the Great Belt), one East-team, Næstved BK, volunteered to join the West-division.

Nordvest FC will from this season be competing under the club's original name Holbæk B&I.

== Participants ==
Locations of the 2014–15 Danish 2nd Division teams (East-teams in red, west-teams in blue). Copenhagen teams: Avedøre, Avarta, B.93, B 1908, Frem, Fremad Amager, GVI, HIK, Herlev, and Hvidovre

Club	Group	Finishing position last season	First season of current spell in 2nd Divisions
Avarta	East	13th	2008–09
Avedøre	East	1st in Denmark Series Group 1	2014–15
B.93	East	10th	2013–14
B 1908	East	5th	2009–10
Brabrand	West	7th	2010–11
FC Helsingør	East	4th	2010–11
FC Svendborg	West	10th	2008–09
FC Sydvest 05	West	13th	2012–13
Frem	East	8th	2012–13
Fremad Amager	East	3rd	2011–12
GVI	East	11th	2013–14
HIK	East	2nd (West)	2008–09
Herlev	East	2nd in Denmark Series Group 1	2014–15
Holbæk	East	6th	2009–10
Hvidovre	East	11th in 1st Division	2014–15
Jammerbugt FC	West	4th	2012–13
Kjellerup	West	2nd in Denmark Series Group 3	2014–15
Kolding BK	West	2nd in Denmark Series Group 2	2014–15
Kolding IF	West	1st in Denmark Series Group 2	2014–15
Marienlyst	West	12th in 1st Division	2014–15
Middelfart	West	9th	2012–13
Nykøbing FC	East	9th	2009–10
Næsby	West	11th	2004–05
Næstved	West	2nd (East)	2012–13
Odder	West	12th	2013–14
Ringkøbing	West	6th	2012–13
Rishøj	East	3rd (West)	2010–11
Skovbakken	West	8th	2010–11
Svebølle	East	12th	2011–12
Søllerød-Vedbæk	East	7th	2005–06
Thisted	West	5th	2010–11
Varde	West	1st in Denmark Series Group 3	2014–15

== East ==
=== League table ===
Pos	Team	Pld	W	D	L	GF	GA	GD	Pts	Promotion or Relegation
1	FC Helsingør (P)	30	22	5	3	59	22	+37	71	Promotion to Danish 1st Division
2	BK Frem	30	18	7	5	56	27	+29	61	
3	Hvidovre IF	30	16	9	5	67	38	+29	57	
4	BK Fremad Amager	30	16	8	6	55	35	+20	56	
5	Nykøbing FC	30	17	4	9	69	34	+35	55	
6	HIK	30	13	9	8	62	32	+30	48	
7	B.93	30	11	10	9	36	35	+1	43	
8	BK Avarta	30	11	9	10	57	48	+9	42	
9	Holbæk B&I	30	10	11	9	41	44	−3	41	
10	B 1908	30	8	13	9	41	35	+6	37	
11	Rishøj BK (R)	30	9	9	12	31	40	−9	36	Qualification to Play-offs
12	Avedøre IF (R)	30	9	9	12	33	46	−13	36	Relegation to Denmark Series
13	Gentofte-Vangede IF (R)	30	6	8	16	28	57	−29	26	Relegation to Denmark Series
14	BK Søllerød-Vedbæk (R)	30	4	9	17	29	60	−31	21	Relegation to Denmark Series
15	Herlev IF (R)	30	2	7	21	27	76	−49	13	Relegation to Denmark Series
16	Svebølle B&I (R)	30	2	4	24	20	77	−57	10	Relegation to Denmark Series

Updated to match(es) played on 20. June. Source: Danish FA
Rules for classification: 1) points; 2) goal difference; 3) number of goals scored
(P) Promoted; (R) Relegated

== West ==
=== League table ===
Pos	Team	Pld	W	D	L	GF	GA	GD	Pts	Promotion or Relegation
1	Næstved BK (P)	30	22	1	7	66	30	+36	67	Promotion to Danish 1st Division
2	BK Marienlyst	30	18	7	5	73	38	+35	61	
3	Jammerbugt FC	30	16	5	9	57	41	+16	53	
4	Thisted FC	30	16	3	11	60	49	+11	51	
5	Skovbakken IK	30	15	6	9	49	48	+1	51	
6	Kolding IF	30	13	7	10	62	44	+18	46	
7	Næsby BK	30	12	8	10	61	49	+12	44	
8	Brabrand IF	30	11	8	11	44	46	−2	41	
9	FC Svendborg	30	10	9	11	45	40	+5	39	
10	Odder IGF	30	11	6	13	49	45	+4	39	
11	Middelfart G&BK (O)	30	11	6	13	50	55	−5	39	Qualification to Play-offs
12	Ringkøbing IF (R)	30	11	6	13	41	51	−10	39	Relegation to Denmark Series
13	FC Sydvest 05 Tønder (R)	30	10	5	15	45	62	−17	35	Relegation to Denmark Series
14	Varde IF (R)	30	5	10	15	35	63	−28	25	Relegation to Denmark Series
15	Kjellerup IF (R)	30	5	6	19	47	73	−26	21	Relegation to Denmark Series
16	Kolding BK (R)	30	5	5	20	42	94	−52	20	Relegation to Denmark Series

Updated to match(es) played on 20. June 2015. Source: Danish FA
Rules for classification: 1) points; 2) goal difference; 3) number of goals scored
(O) Play-off winners; (P) Promoted; (R) Relegated

== Topscores ==
=== East ===
Rank	Player	Club	Goals
1	Mathias Olsen	Nykøbing FC	19
2	Martin Koch	FC Helsingør	17
3	Mikkel Dahl	BK Avarta/Hvidovre IF	16
4	Nicky Berthelsen	Nykøbing FC	15
4	Daniel Pedersen	BK Frem	15

=== West ===
Rank	Player	Club	Goals
1	Mikkel Agger	Thisted FC	25
2	Jakob Rittig	Skovbakken IK	21
3	Jakob Udesen	BK Marienlyst	19
4	Rune Nautrup	Kolding IF	17
5	Sonny Jakobsen	Jammerbugt FC	17

== Play-offs ==
=== Relegation game ===
The teams placed 11th in each group will play promotion game on home and away basis.

Team 1	Agg.	Team 2	1st leg	2nd leg
Middelfart G&BK	2-2	Rishøj BK	1-0	1-2
