= 2016–17 Danish 1st Division =

77th season of Danish 1st Division

NordicBet Liga
- Season: 2016–17
- Champions: Hobro; 1st Danish 1st Division title 1st 2nd tier title
- Promoted: Hobro; Helsingør
- Relegated: Næstved; AB
- Matches played: 198
- Goals scored: 522 (2.64 per match)
- Top goalscorer: Dominic Vinicius (Vejle) (15 goals)

The 2016–17 Danish 1st Division (known as the NordicBet Liga due to sponsorship by NordicBet) marked the 21st season of the league operating as the second tier of Danish football and the 77th season overall under the 1st Division name. The league is governed by the Danish Football Association (DBU).

The 1st Division comprises 12 teams, each playing the others three times for a total of 33 matches per team. Following structural changes to the Danish Superliga, the promotion format was revised for the 2016–17 season. The league champion earns automatic promotion to the 2017–18 Danish Superliga, while the second- and third-placed teams enter promotion playoffs against Superliga opponents for two additional top-flight berths. The teams finishing 11th and 12th are relegated to the 2017–18 Danish 2nd Divisions.

== Participants ==
Hobro IK were relegated from the 2015–16 Danish Superliga, having finished in 12th place. Lyngby Boldklub, Silkeborg IF, and AC Horsens were promoted to the 2016–17 Danish Superliga as part of the league's expansion to 14 teams.

AB, Fremad Amager, and Nykøbing were promoted from the 2015–16 Danish 2nd Divisions.

=== Stadia and locations ===
Locations of the 2016–17 Danish 1st Division teams.

Club	Location	Stadium	Turf	Capacity	2015–16 position
AB	Gladsaxe	Gladsaxe Stadium	Natural	13,800	2D, 1st
FC Fredericia	Fredericia	Monjasa Park	Natural	4,000	6th
FC Helsingør	Helsingør	Helsingør Stadion	Natural	4,500	7th
FC Roskilde	Roskilde	Roskilde Idrætspark	Natural	6,000	9th
Fremad Amager	Copenhagen	Sundby Idrætspark	Natural	7,200	2D, 2nd
HB Køge	Herfølge/Køge	Castus Park	Natural	8,000	8th
Hobro IK	Hobro	DS Arena	Natural	8,000	Superliga, 12th
Nykøbing FC	Nykøbing Falster	Enelco Arena (until 31 December 2016); Nykøbing Falster Idrætspark (since 1 January 2017)	Natural	10,000	2D, 3rd
Næstved BK	Næstved	Euro Outlets Stadion Næstved	Natural	7,500	10th
Skive IK	Skive	Spar Nord Arena	Natural	10,000	11th
Vejle BK	Vejle	Vejle Stadion	Natural	10,418	5th
Vendsyssel FF	Hjørring	Bredbånd Nord Arena	Natural	7,500	4th

=== Personnel and sponsoring ===
Note: Flags indicate national team as has been defined under FIFA eligibility rules. Players and Managers may hold more than one non-FIFA nationality.

Team	Head coach	Captain	Kit manufacturer	Shirt sponsor
AB	(Denmark) Søren Bjerg	(Denmark) Rasmus Grønborg Hansen	Hummel	MASCOT Workwear
FC Fredericia	(Denmark) Jesper Sørensen	(Denmark) Christian Ege Nielsen	Hummel	Monjasa
FC Helsingør	(Denmark) Christian Lønstrup	(Denmark) Andreas Holm	Diadora	Spar Nord
FC Roskilde	(Denmark) Anders Theil	(Denmark) Nikolaj Hansen	Nike	CP ApS
Fremad Amager	(Denmark) John Jensen	(Denmark) Mohammed Abdalas	Adidas	HC Container
HB Køge	(Denmark) Henrik Lehm	(Denmark) Henrik Madsen	Nike	Castus
Hobro IK	(Denmark) Thomas Thomasberg	(Denmark) Mads Justesen	Puma	DS Gruppen, Spar Nord
Nykøbing FC	(Denmark) Jens Olsen	(Denmark) Mathias Olsen	Nike	Jyske Bank
Næstved BK	(Denmark) Michael Hemmingsen	(Denmark) Kristoffer Munksgaard	Joma	Sydbank
Skive IK	(Denmark) Kim Kristensen	(Denmark) Jakob Andersen	Nike	Spar Nord
Vejle BK	(Sweden) Andreas Alm	(Denmark) Steffen Kielstrup	Hummel	VTK / BLITE
Vendsyssel FF	(Denmark) Erik Rasmussen	(Denmark) Chris Sørensen	Puma	Spar Nord

=== Managerial changes ===
Team	Outgoing manager	Manner of departure	Date of vacancy	Replaced by	Date of appointment	Position in table
Skive IK	(Sweden) Joakim Mattsson	End of contract	30 June 2016	(Denmark) Kim Kristensen	1 July 2016	Pre-Season
Vendsyssel FF	(Denmark) Jacob Krüger & Ole Søndergaard	End of tenure as caretakers	30 June 2016	(Sweden) Joakim Mattsson	1 July 2016	Pre-Season
Vejle BK	(Denmark) Steen Thychosen	End of tenure as caretaker	30 June 2016	(Sweden) Andreas Alm	5 July 2016	Pre-Season
Hobro IK	(Denmark) Ove Pedersen	Sacked	28 November 2016	(Denmark) Thomas Thomasberg	4 January 2017	1st
AB	(Denmark) Per Frandsen	Sacked	13 December 2016	(Denmark) Søren Bjerg	12 January 2017	12th
Vendsyssel FF	(Sweden) Joakim Mattsson	Sacked	13 February 2017	(Denmark) Erik Rasmussen	13 February 2017	2nd
Næstved BK	(Denmark) Mogens Krogh	Sacked	27 March 2017	(Denmark) Michael Hemmingsen	29 March 2017	11th

== League table ==
Pos	Team	Pld	W	D	L	GF	GA	GD	Pts	Promotion or Relegation
1	Hobro IK (P, C)	33	17	7	9	54	34	+20	58	Promotion to Danish Superliga
2	Vendsyssel FF	33	16	7	10	51	39	+12	55	Qualification to Promotion play-offs
3	FC Helsingør (P)	33	14	11	8	43	31	+12	53	Qualification to Promotion play-offs
4	FC Roskilde	33	14	8	11	44	43	+1	50	
5	Skive IK	33	15	4	14	41	51	−10	49	
6	HB Køge	33	11	14	8	33	27	+6	47	
7	Nykøbing FC	33	13	7	13	50	51	−1	46	
8	FC Fredericia	33	11	10	12	36	43	−7	43	
9	Vejle BK	33	10	11	12	49	46	+3	41	
10	Fremad Amager	33	10	11	12	42	45	−3	41	
11	Næstved BK (R)	33	9	8	16	45	51	−6	35	Relegation to Danish 2nd Divisions
12	AB (R)	33	6	6	21	34	61	−27	24	Relegation to Danish 2nd Divisions

Source: Danish FA
Rules for classification: 1) points; 2) goal difference; 3) number of goals scored
(C) Champions; (P) Promoted; (R) Relegated
