= 2015–16 Danish 2nd Divisions =

Kanal Sport Divisionen
- Naming rights agreement during season
- Season: 2015–16

The 2015–16 Danish 2nd Divisions will be the first with the league divided in three groups of eight teams in the autumn. In spring there will be a promotion play-off and a relegation play-off. The top three teams of the promotion play-off group will be promoted to the 2016–17 Danish 1st Division.

== Participants ==
Locations of the 2015–16 Danish 2nd Division teams (Group 1 in red, Group 2 in green, Group 3 in blue). Copenhagen teams: AB Tårnby, Akademisk Boldklub, Avarta, B.93, B 1908, Brønshøj Boldklub, Frem, Fremad Amager, HIK, and Hvidovre

Club	Group	Finishing position last season	First season of current spell in 2nd Divisions
Aarhus Fremad	Group 3	1st in Denmark Series Group 3	2015–16
AB Tårnby	Group 1	1st in Denmark Series Group 1	2015–16
Akademisk Boldklub	Group 1	11th in 1st Division	2015–16
Avarta	Group 1	8th	2008–09
B.93	Group 2	7th	2013–14
B 1908	Group 1	10th	2009–10
Brabrand	Group 3	8th	2010–11
Brønshøj Boldklub	Group 1	12th in 1st Division	2015–16
Dalum IF	Group 2	1st in Denmark Series Group 2	2015–16
FC Svendborg	Group 2	9th	2008–09
Frem	Group 2	2nd	2012–13
Fremad Amager	Group 2	4th	2011–12
HIK	Group 1	6th	2008–09
Holbæk	Group 1	9th	2009–10
Hvidovre	Group 1	3rd	2014–15
Jammerbugt FC	Group 3	3rd	2012–13
Kolding IF	Group 3	6th	2014–15
Marienlyst	Group 2	2nd	2014–15
Middelfart BK	Group 3	11th	2012–13
Nykøbing FC	Group 2	5th	2009–10
Næsby	Group 2	7th	2004–05
Odder	Group 3	10th	2013–14
Skovbakken	Group 3	5th	2010–11
Thisted	Group 3	4th	2010–11

== Group 1 ==
=== League table ===
Pos	Team	Pld	W	D	L	GF	GA	GD	Pts	Promotion or Relegation
1	HIK	14	9	3	2	26	14	+12	30	Qualification to Promotion Group
2	Hvidovre IF	14	6	5	3	19	12	+7	23	Qualification to Promotion Group
3	AB Gladsaxe	14	7	2	5	17	13	+4	23	Qualification to Promotion Group
4	Brønshøj Boldklub	14	6	3	5	15	15	0	21	Qualification to Promotion Group
5	BK Avarta	14	6	2	6	19	16	+3	20	Qualification to Relegation Group
6	Holbæk B&I	14	5	3	6	19	22	−3	18	Qualification to Relegation Group
7	AB Tårnby	14	3	2	9	16	29	−13	11	Qualification to Relegation Group
8	B 1908	14	2	4	8	18	28	−10	10	Qualification to Relegation Group

Updated to match(es) played on 7 November 2015. Source: Danish FA
Rules for classification: 1) points; 2) goal difference; 3) number of goals scored

== Group 2 ==
=== League table ===
Pos	Team	Pld	W	D	L	GF	GA	GD	Pts	Promotion or Relegation
1	BK Frem	14	9	3	2	30	12	+18	30	Qualification to Promotion Group
2	BK Fremad Amager	14	9	2	3	30	16	+14	29	Qualification to Promotion Group
3	BK Marienlyst	14	7	4	3	29	25	+4	25	Qualification to Promotion Group
4	Nykøbing FC	14	6	4	4	20	16	+4	22	Qualification to Promotion Group
5	B.93	14	4	2	8	18	19	−1	14	Qualification to Relegation Group
6	Dalum IF	14	3	4	7	20	32	−12	13	Qualification to Relegation Group
7	Næsby BK	14	3	3	8	14	24	−10	12	Qualification to Relegation Group
8	FC Svendborg	14	2	4	8	14	31	−17	10	Qualification to Relegation Group

Updated to match(es) played on 7 November 2015. Source: Danish FA
Rules for classification: 1) points; 2) goal difference; 3) number of goals scored

== Group 3 ==
=== League table ===
Pos	Team	Pld	W	D	L	GF	GA	GD	Pts	Promotion or Relegation
1	Thisted FC	14	10	2	2	39	15	+24	32	Qualification to Promotion Group
2	Brabrand IF	14	8	4	2	26	17	+9	28	Qualification to Promotion Group
3	Middelfart G&BK	14	8	1	5	22	22	0	25	Qualification to Promotion Group
4	Aarhus Fremad	14	6	2	6	26	20	+6	20	Qualification to Promotion Group
5	Jammerbugt FC	14	5	2	7	21	29	−8	17	Qualification to Relegation Group
6	Odder IGF	14	3	5	6	20	29	−9	14	Qualification to Relegation Group
7	Kolding IF	14	3	2	9	19	27	−8	11	Qualification to Relegation Group
8	Skovbakken IK	14	3	2	9	15	29	−14	11	Qualification to Relegation Group

Updated to match(es) played on 7 November 2015. Source: Danish FA
Rules for classification: 1) points; 2) goal difference; 3) number of goals scored

== Promotion Group ==
=== League table ===
The top 4 teams from each group will compete for 3 spots in the 2016–17 Danish 1st Division. The points and goals that the teams won in the autumn group against other participants in the promotion group was transferred to the promotion group.

Pos	Team	Pld	W	D	L	GF	GA	GD	Pts	Promotion or relegation
1	AB Gladsaxe (P)	16	12	2	2	44	15	+29	46	Promotion to 2016–17 Danish 1st Division
2	BK Fremad Amager (P)	16	9	3	4	39	29	+10	40	Promotion to 2016–17 Danish 1st Division
3	Nykøbing FC (P)	16	9	4	3	46	31	+15	36	Promotion to 2016–17 Danish 1st Division
4	BK Frem	16	7	2	7	27	22	+5	34	
5	Brabrand IF	16	4	8	4	36	30	+6	33	
6	Brønshøj Boldklub	16	7	5	4	36	31	+5	33	
7	Thisted FC	16	6	3	7	42	35	+7	31	
8	Aarhus Fremad	16	7	2	7	24	35	−11	29	
9	Hvidovre IF	16	4	6	6	25	23	+2	25	
10	HIK	16	5	0	11	16	36	−20	24	
11	BK Marienlyst	16	5	2	9	34	52	−18	23	
12	Middelfart BK (Note: Middelfart BK was deducted twelve points for paying salaries to amateur players.)	16	2	1	13	20	50	−30	1	

Updated to match(es) played on 18 June 2016. Source: Danish FA
Rules for classification: 1) points; 2) goal difference; 3) number of goals scored
(P) Promoted

== Relegation Group ==
The bottom 4 teams from each group will compete to avoid the 2 relegations spots to the Denmark Series. The points and goals that the teams won in the autumn group against other participants in the relegation group was transferred to the relegation group.

=== League table ===
Pos	Team	Pld	W	D	L	GF	GA	GD	Pts	Promotion or relegation
1	B.93	16	9	4	3	48	28	+20	39	
2	BK Avarta	16	8	4	4	28	23	+5	39	
3	Odder IGF	16	9	3	4	39	24	+15	38	
4	Dalum IF	16	8	5	3	34	23	+11	37	
5	Næsby BK	16	8	4	4	38	23	+15	36	
6	Skovbakken IK	16	6	2	8	42	39	+3	29	
7	Kolding IF	16	6	3	7	33	37	−4	28	
8	Holbæk B&I	16	7	1	8	26	35	−9	28	
9	FC Svendborg	16	5	4	7	30	32	−2	27	
10	Jammerbugt FC	16	4	5	7	36	43	−7	27	
11	AB Tårnby (R)	16	3	3	10	30	49	−19	22	Relegation to Denmark Series
12	B 1908 (R)	16	3	2	11	26	54	−28	16	Relegation to Denmark Series

Updated to match(es) played on 18 June 2016. Source: Danish FA
Rules for classification: 1) points; 2) goal difference; 3) number of goals scored
(R) Relegated
