= 2013–14 Danish 2nd Divisions =

Danish 2nd Divisions
- Season: 2013–14
- Champions: FC Roskilde (east); Skive IK (west)
- Promoted: FC Roskilde (east); Skive IK (west)
- Relegated: Vanløse IF; IF Skjold Birkerød; SC Egedal; Aarhus Fremad; FC Skanderborg; FC Djursland
- Matches: 240 (east); 240 (west)
- Top goalscorer: East: Emil Nielsen (33 goals); West: Anders Hostrup (24 goals)

The 2013–14 Danish 2nd Divisions will be the divided in two groups of sixteen teams. The two group winners will be promoted to the 2014–15 Danish 1st Division.

Because of an uneven distribution of West and East-teams (divided by the Great Belt), two East-teams, Hellerup IK and Rishøj BK, were drawn into the West-division.

== Participants ==
=== Stadia and locations ===
Locations of the 2012–13 Danish 2nd Division teams (east in red, west in blue)

Club	Group	Location	Stadium	Turf	Capacity	2012-13 position
Aarhus Fremad	West	Aarhus	Riisvangen Stadion	Natural	4,500	2nd
BK Avarta	East	Rødovre	Espelundens Idrætsanlæg	Natural	6,000	11th
B.93	East	Copenhagen	Østerbro Stadion	Natural	7,000	DS1, 1st
B 1908	East	Copenhagen	Sundby Idrætspark	Natural	7,200	6th
Brabrand IF	West	Aarhus	Brabrand Stadion	Natural	1,500	3rd
SC Egedal	East	Ølstykke	Ølstykke Stadion	Natural	3,000	DS2, 1st
FC Djursland	West	Grenaa	Grenaa Stadion	Natural	3,000	DS3, 1st
FC Helsingør	East	Helsingør	Helsingør Stadion	Natural	4,500	2nd
FC Roskilde	East	Roskilde	Roskilde Idrætspark	Natural	6,000	8th
FC Skanderborg	West	Skanderborg	Skanderborg Stadion	Natural	1,000	9th
FC Svendborg	West	Svendborg	Høje Bøge Stadion	Natural	7,000	5th
FC Sydvest 05 Tønder	West	Tønder	Tønder Stadion	Natural	1,200	12th
BK Frem	East	Copenhagen	Valby Idrætspark	Natural	12,000	7th
BK Fremad Amager	East	Copenhagen	Sundby Idrætspark	Natural	7,200	14th
Gentofte-Vangede IF	East	Gentofte	Nymosen (Kunstbane)	Artificial	1,000	DS2, 2nd
Hellerup IK	West	Gentofte	Gentofte Stadion	Natural	15,000	5th (East)
IF Skjold Birkerød	East	Rudersdal	Birkerød Stadion	Natural	4,500	13th
Jammerbugt FC	West	Pandrup	Jetsmark Stadion	Natural	6,000	4th
Middelfart Fodbold	West	Middelfart	Middelfart Stadion	Natural	4,000	7th
Nordvest FC	East	Holbæk	Holbæk Stadion	Natural	10,500	9th
Nykøbing FC	East	Nykøbing Falster	Nykøbing Falster Idrætspark	Natural	10,500	10th
Næsby BK	West	Næsby	Næsby Stadion	Natural	2,500	6th
Næstved BK	East	Næstved	Næstved Stadion	Natural	10,000	4th
Odder IGF	West	Odder	Odder Stadion	Natural	2,000	DS3, 2nd
Ringkøbing IF	West	Ringkøbing	Alkjær Stadion	Natural	1,200	13th
Rishøj BK	West	Køge	Rishøj Stadion	Natural	1,000	3rd (East)
Skive IK	West	Skive	Skive Stadion	Natural	10,000	1D, 11th
Skovbakken IK	West	Aarhus	Vejlby Stadion	Natural	5,000	10th
Svebølle B&I	East	Svebølle	Svebølle Stadion	Natural	3,000	12th
BK Søllerød-Vedbæk	East	Rudersdal	Rundforbi Stadion	Natural	5,000	11th (West)
Thisted FC	West	Thisted	Lerpytter Stadion	Natural	3,000	8th
Vanløse IF	East	Copenhagen	Vanløse Idrætspark	Natural	10,000	DS1, 2nd

=== Personnel ===
Note: Flags indicate national team as has been defined under FIFA eligibility rules. Players and Managers may hold more than one non-FIFA nationality.

Team	Head coach	Captain
Aarhus Fremad	(Denmark) Jesper Tollefsen	—N/a
BK Avarta	(Denmark) Thomas Vesth Hansen	—N/a
B.93	(Denmark) Kim Splidsboel	—N/a
B 1908	(Denmark) Christian Iversen	—N/a
Brabrand IF	(Denmark) Tom Søjberg	—N/a
FC Djursland	(Denmark) Jesper Borup	(Denmark) Morten Hjorth
FC Helsingør	(Denmark) Christian Lønstrup	(Denmark) Kasper Enghardt
FC Roskilde	(Denmark) Anders Theil	—N/a
FC Skanderborg	(Denmark) Jan Vingaard	—N/a
FC Sydvest 05 Tønder	(Denmark) Ulrik Pedersen	—N/a
BK Frem	(Denmark) Henrik Jensen	—N/a
BK Fremad Amager	(Denmark) Tim Ilsø	(Denmark) Mohammed Abdalas (spring) (Denmark) Christian Groth Møller (fall)
Jammerbugt FC	(Denmark) Bo Zinck	(Denmark) Nickolaj Thomsen
SC Egedal	(Denmark) Jimmy Kastrup	—N/a
Næstved BK	(Denmark) Preben Christensen	—N/a
Rishøj BK	(Denmark) Jesper Pedersen	(Denmark) Dennis Schmidt
Skive IK	(Denmark) Claus Madsen	(Denmark) Jakob Andersen
Thisted FC	(Denmark) Peter Christensen	(Denmark) Peter Bechmann
Hellerup IK	(Denmark) Hasse Kuhn	(Denmark) Michael Schmidt-Nielsen
Middelfart Fodbold	(Denmark) Torben Mølby	(Denmark) Martin Frandsen
Nordvest FC	(Denmark) Mogens Krogh	(Denmark) Andreas Holm
BK Søllerød-Vedbæk	(Denmark) Claus Larsen	—N/a
Skovbakken IK	(Denmark) Poul Skibsted Lyse (Denmark) Michele Demontis	—N/a
Ringkøbing IF	(Denmark) Kim Kristensen (Denmark) Niels-Henrik Larsen	—N/a
FC Svendborg	(Denmark) Carsten Hemmingsen	—N/a
Nykøbing FC	(Denmark) Jan Jacobsen	—N/a
Vanløse IF	(Denmark) Thomas Petersen	—N/a
Svebølle B&I	(Denmark) Erdogan Aslan	—N/a
IF Skjold Birkerød	(Denmark) Rasmus Monnerup Hansen	—N/a
Gentofte-Vangede IF	(Denmark) Søren Fjorting	(Denmark) Anders Syberg
Næsby BK	(Denmark) Sebastian Brydegaard	(Denmark) Anders Nielsen (spring)
Odder IGF	(Denmark) Henrik Gudmandsen	—N/a

=== Managerial changes ===
Team	Outgoing manager	Manner of departure	Date of vacancy	Position in table	Incoming manager	Date of appointment
Næsby BK	(Denmark) Jens Letort	End of contract	30 June 2013	pre-season	(Denmark) Sebastian Brydegaard	1 July 2013
Gentofte-Vangede IF	(Denmark) Peter Gustavsen	Resigned	16 June 2013	pre-season	(Denmark) Søren Fjorting	1 July 2013
Nordvest FC	(Denmark) Thomas Maale	End of contract	30 June 2013	pre-season	(Denmark) Mogens Krogh	1 July 2013
BK Søllerød-Vedbæk	(Denmark) Claus Larsen	Resigned	30 June 2013	pre-season	(Denmark) Martin Ulrich Nielsen	1 July 2013
Vanløse IF	(Denmark) Morten Rutkjær	Resigned	30 June 2013	pre-season	(Denmark) Thomas Petersen	1 July 2013
Nykøbing FC	(Denmark) Jeppe Tengbjerg	Sacked	10 September 2013	16th	(Denmark) Jan Jacobsen	10 September 2013
FC Djursland	(Denmark) Anders Bjerre	Sacked	3 October 2013	16th	(Denmark) Jesper Borup	3 October 2013
BK Søllerød-Vedbæk	(Denmark) Martin Ulrich Nielsen	Resigned	14 October 2013	—N/a	(Denmark) Claus Larsen	14 October 2013
FC Svendborg	(Denmark) Carsten Mikkelsen	Resigned	15 November 2013	14th	(Denmark) Carsten Hemmingsen	1 January 2014
FC Helsingør	(Denmark) Benny Gall	End of contract	22 November 2013	4th	(Denmark) Christian Lønstrup	1 January 2014
Næstved BK	(Denmark) Martin Jungsgaard	Sacked	4 December 2013	3rd	(Denmark) Preben Christensen	12 December 2013
SC Egedal	(Denmark) Søren Bjerg	Mutual consent	31 December 2013	14th	(Denmark) Jimmy Kastrup	1 January 2014
FC Skanderborg	(Denmark) Claus Christiansen	End of contract	31 December 2013	15th	(Denmark) Jan Vingaard	1 January 2014
Ringkøbing IF	(Denmark) Jens S. Nielsen	Mutual consent	31 December 2013	9th	(Denmark) Kim Kristensen (Denmark) Niels-Henrik Larsen	1 January 2014

== 2nd Division East ==
=== League table ===
Pos	Team	Pld	W	D	L	GF	GA	GD	Pts	Promotion or relegation
1	FC Roskilde (C, P)	30	26	2	2	88	22	+66	80	Promotion to Danish 1st Division
2	Næstved BK	30	18	7	5	69	34	+35	61	
3	Fremad Amager	30	15	6	9	76	55	+21	51	
4	Helsingør	30	15	5	10	59	35	+24	50	
5	B 1908	30	15	5	10	46	36	+10	50	
6	Nordvest FC	30	12	9	9	66	58	+8	45	
7	Søllerød-Vedbæk	30	10	11	9	40	42	−2	41	
8	Frem	30	9	11	10	46	44	+2	38	
9	Nykøbing FC	30	11	5	14	49	59	−10	38	
10	B.93	30	10	6	14	42	43	−1	36	
11	GVI	30	9	8	13	42	63	−21	35	
12	Svebølle B&I	30	8	8	14	32	46	−14	32	
13	Avarta	30	8	7	15	50	67	−17	31	
14	Vanløse IF (R)	30	8	5	17	34	67	−33	29	Relegation to Denmark Series
15	IF Skjold Birkerød (R)	30	8	4	18	39	69	−30	28	Relegation to Denmark Series
16	SC Egedal (R)	30	4	9	17	31	69	−38	21	Relegation to Denmark Series

Updated to match(es) played on 21 June 2014. Source: Danish FA
Rules for classification: 1) points; 2) goal difference; 3) number of goals scored.
(C) Champions; (P) Promoted; (R) Relegated

=== Results ===
Home \ Away	B08	B93	BKA	BKF	FrA	BSV	FCH	FCR	GVI	ISB	NVFC	NFC	NBK	SCE	SBI	VIF
B 1908		2–0	2–1	1–4	0–3	2–1	2–0	0–0	2–0	2–0	0–1	5–1	1–2	1–0	2–3	2–3
B.93	1–1		4–1	0–0	1–2	1–2	0–2	1–1	1–1	1–0	0–1	4–0	0–1	3–0	0–2	2–3
Avarta	1–3	3–2		1–7	3–2	1–2	3–3	2–4	0–2	1–3	2–2	2–4	0–2	3–1	1–1	2–2
Frem	1–1	1–1	2–1		2–3	0–1	2–1	0–4	1–1	2–0	1–1	1–3	1–3	1–1	0–0	3–0
Fremad Amager	4–1	2–3	1–2	1–1		2–1	2–1	2–6	8–2	3–1	2–0	4–3	2–2	1–1	1–2	4–0
Søllerød-Vedbæk	1–1	1–3	2–2	1–1	2–2		0–0	0–4	3–2	1–1	1–1	1–0	0–1	1–0	0–1	6–1
Helsingør	1–0	2–1	2–3	4–0	6–1	0–0		3–1	0–1	3–0	3–2	3–0	0–2	5–1	2–0	7–1
FC Roskilde	2–1	1–0	2–1	2–0	3–0	2–0	1–0		2–0	4–1	5–3	1–3	2–0	6–1	3–0	1–0
GVI	1–2	1–3	2–1	2–1	1–1	1–1	3–1	0–6		3–0	2–2	0–3	1–3	2–2	0–0	0–1
IF Skjold Birkerød	2–1	2–2	2–1	2–4	2–7	0–1	0–3	0–5	1–3		2–2	3–1	1–5	1–1	3–1	2–1
Nordvest FC	1–2	1–2	2–5	5–2	3–2	5–2	1–1	1–3	4–0	4–3		2–0	3–5	4–0	1–0	1–1
Nykøbing FC	1–2	3–0	3–1	0–0	0–4	1–3	1–1	1–3	3–6	3–1	3–3		1–1	2–1	1–0	3–0
Næstved BK	0–1	3–0	1–1	1–1	2–2	2–2	5–1	2–4	4–0	1–0	5–2	2–0		2–2	0–3	6–1
SC Egedal	0–2	4–2	0–2	1–5	3–2	1–1	0–2	0–5	0–2	1–4	2–2	2–0	1–0		1–3	1–2
Svebølle B&I	0–3	0–3	1–1	1–2	1–4	2–0	1–2	0–3	2–2	2–0	1–3	2–2	0–1	2–2		0–0
Vanløse IF	1–1	0–1	1–2	1–0	0–2	2–3	1–0	0–2	5–1	0–2	1–3	1–3	1–5	1–1	3–1	

Updated to match(es) played on 21 June 2014. Source: Danish FA
Legend: Blue = home team win; Yellow = draw; Red = away team win.

== 2nd Division West ==
=== League table ===
Pos	Team	Pld	W	D	L	GF	GA	GD	Pts	Promotion or relegation
1	Skive IK (C, P)	30	25	2	3	78	28	+50	77	Promotion to Danish 1st Division
2	HIK	30	15	10	5	51	39	+12	55	
3	Rishøj BK	30	15	8	7	57	40	+17	53	
4	Jammerbugt	30	15	7	8	56	42	+14	52	
5	Thisted FC	30	13	7	10	46	41	+5	46	
6	Ringkøbing IF	30	13	5	12	55	49	+6	44	
7	Brabrand	30	11	9	10	51	46	+5	42	
8	Skovbakken IK	30	12	6	12	49	50	−1	42	
9	Middelfart Fodbold	30	11	5	14	44	50	−6	38	
10	FC Svendborg	30	8	13	9	41	39	+2	37	
11	Næsby BK	30	9	9	12	49	52	−3	36	
12	Odder IGF	30	9	9	12	38	44	−6	36	
13	Sydvest 05 Tønder	30	9	6	15	51	70	−19	33	
14	Aarhus Fremad (R)	30	7	11	12	29	42	−13	32	Relegation to Denmark Series
15	FC Skanderborg (R)	30	8	7	15	51	65	−14	31	Relegation to Denmark Series
16	Djursland (R)	30	1	4	25	22	71	−49	7	Relegation to Denmark Series

Updated to match(es) played on 21 June 2014. Source: Danish FA
Rules for classification: 1) points; 2) goal difference; 3) number of goals scored.
(C) Champions; (P) Promoted; (R) Relegated

=== Results ===
Home \ Away	BIF	FCD	FCSK	FCSV	S05	HIK	JFC	MF	NB	OIGF	RIF	RBK	SIK	SBIK	TFC	AFR
Brabrand		2–0	3–2	1–0	5–2	0–1	1–1	2–3	3–1	2–0	5–2	0–0	1–4	1–2	1–2	0–0
Djursland	0–0		0–1	0–2	1–2	0–1	2–4	1–2	0–2	1–0	0–3	1–3	0–5	1–3	1–3	0–1
FC Skanderborg	3–2	4–3		3–3	1–1	1–2	1–3	1–3	1–2	1–0	1–2	1–1	1–2	2–1	2–1	1–1
FC Svendborg	1–2	2–0	2–2		2–1	1–1	0–2	3–2	2–0	0–2	2–2	1–1	1–2	2–2	1–1	3–0
Sydvest 05 Tønder	0–3	2–1	4–2	3–2		2–2	2–1	3–2	1–3	2–2	2–2	1–3	1–4	1–6	1–1	1–0
HIK	1–1	2–2	3–2	2–1	2–1		4–2	2–1	0–2	0–0	2–1	0–2	3–5	1–0	2–2	4–0
Jammerbugt	1–1	1–1	4–0	2–0	3–1	2–2		3–0	3–2	2–1	3–2	0–2	3–1	1–3	2–0	1–0
Middelfart Fodbold	2–1	3–0	2–2	1–2	3–1	1–3	1–2		1–1	4–1	1–0	0–2	1–4	2–0	0–0	1–1
Næsby BK	3–4	3–1	2–1	0–0	1–2	0–0	3–1	1–2		1–1	3–4	2–2	1–0	2–2	1–3	3–3
Odder IGF	3–0	3–1	3–2	1–1	2–1	0–1	1–1	3–2	0–0		1–3	3–0	1–4	0–3	1–0	5–2
Ringkøbing IF	5–2	3–0	4–2	2–2	3–2	0–2	0–0	0–1	4–1	1–1		1–3	0–1	3–2	2–0	0–2
Rishøj BK	2–2	2–2	4–5	0–0	3–2	1–4	3–0	3–0	3–3	3–1	0–1		1–2	3–1	1–0	1–3
Skive IK	2–1	4–0	2–1	2–2	3–0	4–2	4–1	3–0	2–1	3–0	3–1	0–2		0–0	3–1	2–0
Skovbakken IK	2–4	1–0	3–2	2–1	5–2	0–0	1–5	2–1	4–2	0–0	0–3	3–2	0–3		1–3	0–0
Thisted FC	1–1	5–2	1–1	0–2	2–2	4–1	2–1	2–1	0–3	2–1	3–1	1–2	1–2	1–0		2–1
Aarhus Fremad	0–0	2–1	1–2	0–0	0–5	1–1	1–1	1–1	2–0	1–1	2–0	0–2	1–2	2–0	1–2	

Updated to match(es) played on 11 November 2013. Source: Danish FA
Legend: Blue = home team win; Yellow = draw; Red = away team win.
