= Emeka Andersen =

Danish footballer (born 1971)

Personal information
- Full name: Emeka Clarence Akpuaka Andersen
- Date of birth: 8 June 1971 (age 55)
- Place of birth: Denmark
- Height: 1.89 m (6 ft 2 in)
- Position: Goalkeeper

Youth career
- –1989: Brøndby IF

Senior career*
Years	Team	Apps	(Gls)
1989–1990	Skjold Birkerød		
1990–1995	BK Avarta		
1995–2000	Brøndby IF	22	(0)
2000–2001	Farum BK		
2001–2007	FK Prespa		
2007–2011	BK Avarta		
Total		22+	(0+)

International career
	Denmark U19	1	(0)
- * Club domestic league appearances and goals

Emeka Clarence Akpuaka Andersen (born 8 June 1971) is a former Danish footballer who played as a goalkeeper.

== Early life ==
Andersen was born in 1971 in Denmark. He is of Nigerian descent.

== Playing career ==
Andersen started his career with Danish side Brøndby IF. He played in the UEFA Champions League while playing for the club. On November 4 1998, he started in an 0–5 loss against Manchester United in the UEFA Champions League.

He retired from professional football due to injury before coming out of retirement to play for Danish side Avarta.

== Post-playing career ==
After retiring from professional football, Andersen worked as director of handball club AG København. He also worked as a goalkeeper coach for, inter alia, BK Frem, Hvidovre IF and the Faroese national team. On 8 July 2025, he was announced as the new goalkeeping coach for Fremad Amager.

== Personal life ==
Andersen has also played handball and bobsleigh concurrently as his football career. After retiring from professional football, he lived in Stevns Municipality, Denmark.
