= Peter Foldgast =

Danish footballer and coach (born 1979)

Personal information
- Date of birth: 3 December 1979 (age 46)
- Place of birth: Copenhagen, Denmark
- Height: 1.84 m (6 ft 0 in)
- Positions: Midfielder; forward

Team information
- Current team: FC Roskilde (forward coach)

Youth career
- Vallensbæk IF
- –1999: BK Frem
- 1999–2000: AGF

Senior career*
| Years | Team | Apps | (Gls) |
| 2000–2004 | Brøndby IF | 58 | (16) |
| 2004–2005 | Rot-Weiss Essen | 17 | (4) |
| 2005–2008 | AGF | 35 | (7) |
| 2008 | EB/Streymur | 2 | (0) |
| 2008–2009 | FC Vestsjælland | | |

International career
| 1996–1997 | Denmark U-19 | 14 | (7) |

Managerial career
- 2009–2010: FC Vestsjælland (assistant)
- 2012–2014: Brøndby IF U19
- 2014–2015: Brøndby IF (forward coach)
- 2016–: FC Roskilde (forward coach)
- 2019: FC Roskilde (caretaker)
- * Club domestic league appearances and goals

Peter Foldgast (born 3 December 1979) is a Danish former professional football player. He is currently working as a forward coach at FC Roskilde.

== Coaching career ==
On 14 May 2019, FC Roskilde manager Christian Lønstrup was suspended by the club for the rest of the season, after he accused his own players of match fixation. The following day, the club appointed Foldgast as the manager for the rest of the season, since he already was working for the club as forward coach.
