= Peter Feher =

Danish football manager (born 1974)

Personal information
- Full name: Peter Feher
- Date of birth: 7 May 1974 (age 52)
- Place of birth: Copenhagen, Denmark

Managerial career
- Years: Team
- 2001–2003: BK Skjold (youth)
- 2003–2006: Frem (youth)
- 2006–2014: Nordsjælland (youth)
- 2014–2015: Nordsjælland (assistant)
- 2016–2018: HIK
- 2017–2019: Lithuania U21 (assistant)
- 2018–2019: Helsingør
- 2020–2021: AaB (assistant)
- 2020: AaB (caretaker)
- 2021–2022: OB (assistant)

Peter Feher (born 7 May 1974) is a Danish professional football manager.

== Coaching career ==
Feher has a background as a youth academy manager, coaching the U17 and U19 sides of BK Skjold and Frem before moving to Nordsjælland in 2006, where he held positions as youth coach, technical director, scout and first-team assistant the following decade.

In October 2016, Feher was appointed as head coach of HIK where he signed a two-year contract. During his tenure at HIK, he worked as assistant coach for the Lithuania national under-21 team. After two years at HIK, he was hired as the new head coach of FC Helsingør where he replaced the outgoing Christian Lønstrup in September 2018. Due to disappointing results, he was fired on 22 April 2019.

After taking a year off from coaching duties, Feher was appointed as assistant coach at AaB on 6 August 2020 working under head coach Jacob Friis and alongside fellow assistant, Rasmus Würtz. After Friis stepped down from his position for personal reasons, Feher took over as caretaker manager. With Martí Cifuentes appointed as the new head coach of AaB, Feher stepped back into the assistant role in December 2020.

On 2 June 2021, Feher was appointed assistant coach to new head coach Andreas Alm at OB.

== Education ==
Feher holds the UEFA Pro Licence, also known as the 'P licence'; the highest coaching education. As part of his education, he wrote an assignment on Hungarian club Győri ETO FC and its talent academy. He also holds a master's degree in physical education from Semmelweis University in Budapest, Hungary.

== Career statistics ==
=== Managerial ===
As of match played 20 December 2020

Managerial record by club and tenure
Team	From	To	Record				
Team	From	To	M	W	D	L	Win %
HIK	27 October 2016	10 September 2018	57	30	10	17	52.63
Helsingør	10 September 2018	22 April 2019	19	4	6	9	21.05
AaB (caretaker)	29 October 2020	31 December 2020	10	5	2	3	50.00
Total			86	39	18	29	45.35
