= Christian Nielsen (football manager) =

Danish professional football manager (born 1974)

Personal information
- Date of birth: 9 January 1974 (age 52)
- Place of birth: Denmark

Team information
- Current team: Lyngby (head coach)

Managerial career
- Years: Team
- 1994–2012: Lyngby (youth)
- 2010–2012: Denmark U21 (assistant)
- 2013–2015: Nordsjælland (youth)
- 2018: Lyngby (assistant)
- 2018–2020: Lyngby

Christian Nielsen (born 9 January 1974) is a Danish professional football manager. He was most recently the manager of Danish Superliga club Lyngby.

== Managerial career ==
Nielsen worked in the youth department of Lyngby Boldklub, before moving to the youth of FC Nordsjælland on 1 January 2013. In January 2018, Nielsen returned to the youth academy Lyngby, before he became the caretaker manager for the first team in the same club in November 2018, after they had fired Mark Strudal. At that time, Lyngby was a second-tier 1st Division side, and after leading the club to promotion to the Superliga, Nielsen was appointed as the permanent new head coach.
