= Kim Kristensen =

Danish footballer (born 1975)

Personal information
- Full name: Kim Kristensen
- Date of birth: 10 January 1975 (age 51)
- Place of birth: Denmark
- Height: 1.80 m (5 ft 11 in)
- Position: Midfielder

Youth career
- 1984–?: Holstebro Boldklub

Senior career*
Years	Team	Apps	(Gls)
?–1997	Holstebro		
1997–2001	Frem	121	(37)
2001–2002	Midtjylland	26	(0)
2002–2004	Frem	78	(10)
2004–2005	Herfølge	30	(1)
2005–2008	Vejle	82	(16)
2008–2012	Holstebro		
2012–2013	Ringkøbing		

Managerial career
- 2009–2012: Holstebro (playing assistant)
- 2013–2016: Ringkøbing
- 2016: Tjørring
- 2016–2017: Skive
- 2018–: Holstebro
- * Club domestic league appearances and goals as of June 14, 2008

Kim Kristensen (born 10 January 1975) is a Danish professional football coach and former player who is currently the head coach of Denmark Series club Holstebro Boldklub.
