= Odder IGF =

Danish football club

- Full name: Odder Idræts- og Gymnastikforening
- Founded: 1899; 127 years ago
- Ground: Spektrum Park, Odder
- Capacity: 1,000
- Chairman: Emil Kildeberg Olsen
- Manager: Denis Fazlagic
- League: Denmark Series
- 2025–26: Danish 3rd Division 11th of 12 (relegated)
- Website: https://www.odderfodbold.dk/
Home colours	Away colours

Odder Idræts- og Gymnastikforening, commonly known as Odder IGF, is a football club based in Odder, Denmark. Founded in 1899, the club has a long-standing presence in the lower tiers of Danish football and currently competes in the Denmark Series, which is the fifth tier of the Danish football league system. Odder IGF plays its home matches at Spektrum Park, a stadium with a capacity of 1,000 spectators. Over the years, the club has played an integral role in promoting football at the regional level and has developed a reputation for nurturing local talent.

== History ==
In the spring of 1899, a small group of people formed Odder IGF in Odder, the "largest village in Denmark". Since, the club mostly played in the lower divisions of Danish football.

In 1993, club chairman Bent Villumsen laid out plans for securing the future success of Odder IGF. These plans came to fruition in 2013, when Odder IGF promoted to the Danish 2nd Division – the third tier in the Danish football system – for the first time in the club's 114-year history. The historical promotion occurred under Villumsen's successor as chairman, Peter Lindberg Christensen, who had laid out the future plans for the club together alongside Villumsen in 1993.

One of the more remarkable events in club history occurred before the famed promotion. More specifically on 25 August 2010, as Odder IGF reached the second round of the Danish Cup and drew AGF, the largest team in the region. Almost 2,500 spectators had come to Spektrum Park to see the local side lose 0–1 to AGF after a goal in stoppage time by Casper Sloth.

On the last day of the 2018–19 season, Odder IGF suffered relegation to the Denmark Series after a 2–2 draw against Vejgaard BK. This meant that six consecutive seasons in the Danish 2nd Division came to an end.

On 20 May 2024, Odder secured promotion back to the Danish divisions with a draw against Aarhus Fremad's reserves, ensuring they would compete in the Danish 3rd Division from the 2024–25 season.

== Honours ==
- Denmark Series
  - Winners (1): 2023–24
  - Runners-up (1): 2012–13
