= Christian Lønstrup =

Danish footballer and manager (born 1971)

Personal information
- Full name: Christian Lønstrup
- Date of birth: 4 April 1971 (age 55)
- Place of birth: Denmark
- Height: 1.87 m (6 ft 2 in)
- Position: Midfielder

Youth career
- B 1903
- B 93
- KB

Senior career*
| Years | Team | Apps | (Gls) |
| 1990 | KB | | |
| 1991–1992 | B 1903 | 17 | (2) |
| 1992–1996 | FC Copenhagen | 112 | (12) |
| 1996–1998 | Cagliari | 44 | (4) |
| 1998–2006 | FC Copenhagen | 92 | (5) |
| 2004–2005 | → AB (loan) | | |
| 2005–2006 | KB | | |

International career
| 1991 | Denmark u-21 | 3 | (1) |

Managerial career
- 2005: AB (playing assistant)
- 2010–2013: Elite 3000/FC Helsingør (assistant)
- 2013: AB (assistant)
- 2013–2018: FC Helsingør
- 2018–2019: FC Roskilde
- 2021–: Hillerød Fodbold
- * Club domestic league appearances and goals

Christian Lønstrup (born 4 April 1971) is a Danish former football player, and current manager.

== Playing career ==
Lønstrup most prominently played 253 games as a midfielder for Danish club F.C. Copenhagen, with whom he won four Danish Superliga championships. He played three games and scored one goal for the Denmark U21 national team in 1991.

He had a very public trial versus his former club F.C. Copenhagen, having allegedly received misleading guidance concerning the taxation of his salary upon returning to Denmark in 1998. The case was settled out of court for a fee believed to be around DKK 700,000.

== Coaching career ==
Lønstrup was loaned out to AB in the summer 2004. In January 2005, it was announced that he would be the assistant manager under manager Henrik Jensen for the rest of the season.

On 18 October 2005, Lønstrup was hired as the talent manager of B 93 from 2006. He held the position until August 2007.

=== FC Helsingør ===
In August 2010, he became the assistant manager at FC Helsingør - formerly known as Elite 3000 - under manager Benny Gall. He left the position in July 2013 to become the assistant manager of AB.

In December 2013, he was appointed as the manager of FC Helsingør from January 2014. Lønstrup managed to lead the team to promotion to the 2017–18 Danish Superliga. At the end of August 2018, Lønstrup resigned from his position due to discrepancies in relation to playing style and squad composition.

=== FC Roskilde & matchfixing case ===
On 10 September 2018, he was appointed as the manager of FC Roskilde in the Danish 1st Division. After a 2–1 defeat to Lyngby Boldklub on 12 May 2019, Lønstrup accused his own players of match-fixing. The charges from the manager surfaced at a meeting with the team, where the players demanded that Lønstrup present the evidence he said he had on the match fix. The national lottery in Denmark, Danske Spil, then said that they were investigating the charges. FC Roskilde announced later on the same day, that they had decided to suspend Lønstrup until the end of the season, in order to ensure peace of mind over the last two matches and at the same time have time to find the head and tail in the above claims.

The players allowed DIF to look in their private accounts as a part of the investigation and later also the Danish police joined the investigation. The Danish media, Politikken, wrote on 26 May 2019, that suspicious amounts have been played on matches with FC Roskilde in German kiosks. There were at least two games, that where suspicious, especially a game against Næstved BK, where large sums had been invested within a narrow geographical area in Germany. The bets were allegedly placed on the fact that there should be at least three scores in that match that ended 4–1 to Næstved. In 2014, Tipico closed for games on one of FC Vestsjælland's matches, and according to Politiken's information, the suspicious amounts of Roskilde's matches have been played from the same narrow area in Germany as then.

The owner of Roskilde then went out and said, that Lønstrup had decided to resign by himself, but Lønstrup denied that and filed FC Roskilde in June 2019. Lønstrup wrote in a letter to TV 2 Sport "I am sorry that my collaboration with FC Roskilde has ended in this way with a lack of support from the management, but I know that I responded as I did, and I still believe that it was the right thing to do".

=== Hillerød Fodbold ===
Following a hiatus from football Lønstrup was named new manager of Hillerød Fodbold in January 2021.

== Honours ==
- Danish Superliga: 1993, 2001, 2003, 2004
- Danish Cup: 1995, 2004
- Danish Super Cup: 1995, 2001
