= Jammerbugt FC =

Former association football club in Pandrup, Denmark

Jammerbugt
- Full name: Jammerbugt Fodbold Club
- Founded: 2008; 17 years ago, as Blokhus FC
- Dissolved: 2022; 3 years ago
- Ground: Sparekassen Vendsyssel Arena, Pandrup
- Capacity: 6,000
Home colours	Away colours

Jammerbugt Fodbold Club was a Danish club based in Pandrup, Jammerbugt Municipality, that folded after the court in Hjørring issued a bankruptcy decree on 22 August 2022.

== History ==
=== Jetsmark IF ===
Logo of Blokhus FC from July 2008 to February 2013.

The club was founded on 27 August 1973 as a merger between the two neighbouring clubs Kaas IF and Pandrup Boldklub. As Kaas had been playing in green shirts and Pandrup in white, the new first team shirt of course had to be a mix of those two colours. As their first coach they hired Preben Larsen who, for a long time, had been an influential first team player in AaB.

The club was capable of having teams spread across all of the six lowest Danish divisions in their first season, and the first home game on the new ground – which was opened on 7 April 1974. It was against Frederikshavn fI in the sixth-tier Series 1. The game was eventually won by Jetsmark IF after a goal scored just a few minutes before the final whistle by Arne Johansen. After a long period with teams competing in Series 2 and 3, and none of them looking to promote to the higher tiers in the near future, hopes of playing in a higher division suddenly were suddenly fueled, when a group of former players established the organisation "Team Jetsmark", whose only purpose was to find players, staff, and funds to make the club return to Series 1. With Torben Nielsen as the head coach, that goal was achieved in 1992.

However, the greatest highlight of the club's history so far is considered to be the promotion to the third-tier Danish 2nd Division in 2002. After a 3–1 win in Herning, the club could celebrate their victory. Jetsmark IF also reached the round of 16 in the 2003 edition of the Danish Cup, but Helsingør IF finally knocked them out.

=== Blokhus and Jammerbugt ===
An elite superstructure went into effect on 1 July 2008 for the first senior team under the name Blokhus FC. On 26 February 2013, the club's general assembly decided to change the name from Blokhus FC to Jammerbugt FC. The club started using the new name in the spring of 2013 in match programmes, advertisements etc., but it would not be used officially in tournaments organized by the Danish Football Association (DBU) until the following season.

In the 2020–21 season, Jammerbugt achieved promotion to the second-tier Danish 1st Division by winning the Danish 2nd Division championship. In the year of the promotion, it was announced that German investor Klaus Müller had completed a takeover of the club. In order to meet stricter licensing requirements, field heating, stronger lighting and more seats were installed at Jetsmark Stadion. After a chaotic 2021–22 season, which saw an influx of foreign players, Jammerbugt suffered relegation as bottom of the league. Meanwhile, the club struggled with payments to players and local creditors, and regional core of players had been replaced by prospects from Müllers academies in Mali and Nigeria.

On 22 August 2022, the court in Hjørring issued a bankruptcy decree on Jammerbugt FC. Following the winding-up order, the club was initially suspended and then expelled from the Danish 2nd Division with effect from 24 August 2022. The remains of the former superstructure would continue as parent club Jetsmark IF in the Jutland Series from the 2023–24 season.

== Coach history ==
No.	Head coach	Nationality	From	Until	Days	Notes
1	Henning Pedersen	Denmark	1 July 2008	30 June 2009	364	
2	Henrik Larsen	Denmark	1 July 2009	11 December 2009	163	
3	Henning Pedersen	Denmark	8 January 2010	30 June 2010	173	^{Note 1}
4	Søren Kusk	Denmark	1 July 2010	30 June 2012	730	
5	Bo Zinck	Denmark	1 July 2012	30 June 2015	1094	
6	Frode Langagergaard	Denmark	1 July 2015	2 May 2016	306	
7	Martin Pedersen	Denmark	2 May 2016	16 November 2016	198	
8	Lars Justesen	Denmark	16 November 2016	30 June 2017	226	
9	Bo Zinck	Denmark	1 July 2017	31 December 2021	1644	
10	Nabil Trabelsi	Germany	1 January 2022	30 June 2022	180	
11	Paul Aigbogun	Nigeria	2 August 2022	24 August 2022	22	

Notes

1. Interim coach.
