= FC Sydvest 05 Tønder =

Danish football club

- Full name: Fodbold Club Sydvest 05 Tønder
- Founded: 1 January 2005; 20 years ago (merger); 4 December 2013; 11 years ago (independent club)
- Ground: Tønder Stadion and Løgumkloster Stadion; Tønder and Løgumkloster, Denmark
- Capacity: 1,200 ^{[stadium section]}
- Chairman of board: Thorsten Simonsen
- Head coach: Jes Bekke
- League: Jutland Series
- Website: http://www.fcsydvest.dk/
Home colours	Away colours

Fodbold Club Sydvest 05 Tønder (Danish pronunciation: [ˈfoðpʌltˌkʰlup syðˈvest nɔlˈfemˀ]), or simply Sydvest 05, is a Danish football club based in Tønder Municipality. The club is a merger established in Southwestern Sønderjylland in 2005 between Løgum IF Fodbold, Bredebro IF, Ballum IF and Tønder SF Fodbold. Therefore, the club is an affiliation between the neighbouring towns of Ballum, Bredebro, Løgumkloster and Tønder, who also share, since 2012, an under-19 and under-17 team besides the first team. The senior side is based in Tønder and Løgumkloster, and play the vast majority of their home games at Tønder Stadion and Løgumkloster Stadion which can hold a total of 1,200 spectators.

Upon the establishment of the club in 2005, the first team competed in Serie 2, the seventh tier division of Danish football, from which it promoted during the first year of existence. After four seasons in Serie 1, Sydvest 05 reached promotion to Jyllandsserien and after two seasons another promotion was achieved to the Denmark Series, the fourth division. In 2012, the club earned promotion to the Danish 2nd Division, the third tier division.

The Southwest Jutland collaboration is a member of the local football union, DBU Jutland (JBU) through which it has membership of the Danish Football Union (DBU). The teams of the local clubs involved in the merger continue to be organised by these, and compete in the lower divisions of Danish football.

== History ==
=== 2003–2004: Establishment ===
In the summer of 2003 the initiative of gathering the best players in the Southwestern corner of Sønderjylland on one team was begun behind the scenes. Seven football clubs and local rivals, Ballum Idrætsforening (founded 1940), Bredebro Idrætsforening (founded 1920), Bylderup-Burkal Idrætsforening (founded 1966), Højer Idrætsforening, Løgum Idrætsforening, Skærbæk Boldklub (founded 1910; football department established on 3 March 1994 as an independent section under the same name) and Tønder Sportsforening Fodbold (founded 17 May 1920; football department as an independent section since 2003), convened at a preliminary meeting in early August 2003 in Bredebro. On the agenda in the meeting between representatives of the neighbourly clubs, Jørgen Kristensen (Ballum IF), Lars Bach Sørensen (Skærbæk BK), Flemming Søndergaard (Skærbæk BK), Ove Danielsen (Højer IF), Keld Hansen (Løgum IF), Jørgen Juul Pedersen (Bylderup-Burkal IF), Gunnar Jordt (Tønder SF) and Flemming Jordt (Bredebro IF), was a debate between the disappointing results on the pitch, their common struggles in the lower tiers of Danish football, and wishes from the players of competing at a higher level. The solution was to be a collaborative project between the regional clubs in reaching social and sportive success. Following the first meeting, Bylderup-Burkal IF withdrew from a potential collaboration whereas the remaining six clubs continued to draw up plans for a merger with the intention of letting each club surrender its best players to a common elite-team which would represent the parent clubs, FC Sydvest 05.

Following a determined effort to realise the project during the fall of 2003, a model for a future collaboration between the regional clubs was presented to their respective boards at a meeting in Løgumkloster in January 2004. Present at the meeting were 30 participants, who agreed to a month of considerment regarding their continued support for the process, as well as reflect on the option of involving youth teams in the merger, which had until that point only related to a senior side. After consulting their board and senior team, Skærbæk Boldklub and Højer Idrætsforening chose to withdraw from further participation, which representatives informed the other clubs at the next meeting in March 2004. The remaining four regional clubs, Ballum Idrætsforening, Bredebro Idrætsforening, Løgum Idrætsforening and Tønder Sportsforening Fodbold, however, agreed to continue to process of creating a new united cooperative. Expectations were that a larger workload would lie ahead, which led representatives from the four clubs to include four more club representatives, which meant that the voluntary collaboration committee included eight representatives, two each of the four clubs involved in the plans. Meanwhile, the representative from Løgum IF had decided to quit due to not having sufficient time to work voluntarily, which meant that a new collaboration committee was made up of Jørgen Kristensen and Orla Simonsen from Ballum IF, Ejvin Toft Nielsen and Flemming Jordt from Bredebro IF, Morten Gram and Morten Classen from Løgum IF as well as Gunnar Jordt and Torsten Vestergaard from Tønder SF.

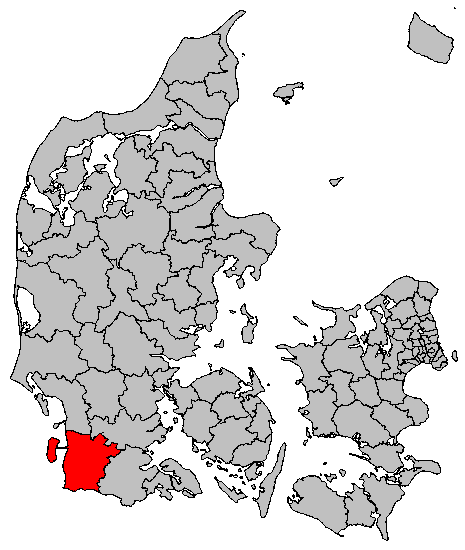
Location of Tønder Municipality in Denmark where the four parent clubs merged to form FC Sydvest 05.

Plans for merging the four regional clubs was announced at a press conference by the board of the four parent clubs involved in May 2004 under the name "FC Sydvest 05". The newly formed club in the Western parts of Southern Denmark would make its competitive debut as early as 2005 and begin with an integrated first team on senior level and a common youth team to play in the local divisions of Region 4 of the DBU Jutland, its Southwestern region (hence its name, "Sydvest" literally meaning "Southwest"). The name was chosen as the result of a naming competition, where the proposal from Hanne Clausen from Bredebro won. The reserve teams and second teams on senior level would remain part of the parent clubs, while Tønder SF's youth team was incorporated under the FC Sydvest 05 name, opening up the possibility for competing with more than one youth side. The overall objective for the first team was declared to be promotion in its second season, after which a period of stabilisation was expected before taking the next step up to the Jutland Series in 2007, the sixth highest level of Danish football. In the long run the merger was to compete at Denmark Series (fourth tier division) level and obtain status as the second club of Southern Denmark, only behind SønderjyskE Fodbold.

After the respective boards of Tønder SF, Bredebro IF, Løgum IF and Ballum IF had reached an agreement on the merger, the members of the collaboration committee made sure that all requirements for participation in DBU Jutland competitions were met before the holding of the extraordinary general assembly of the four parent clubs. A kickoff meeting with 40 participants from the four clubs was held prior to the general assemblies. On 5 August 2004, the final mandate to go ahead with the project was agreed upon by an overwhelming majority (90%) of the 150 voting attendees, who showed their support for a closer collaboration between the clubs. Contrary to Ballum IF, Bredebro IF and Løgum IF, there were some members of Tønder SF who had expressed their skepticism prior to the vote. However, among the 60 attendees present at the final decision in the clubhouse, only four voted against the merger, while 54 voted for the merger and two abstained.

At the end of 2004, Gunnar Jordt and Torsten Vestergaard withdrew from the collaboration committee and were replaced by Børge Nielsen as Tønder SF's representative. The common collaboration committee, which was chosen instead of having a genuine board, consisted of nine members with the aim of having at least two representatives of each parent club present. This makeup meant that discussions and compromises were made before taking decisions rather than voting. A chairman, a vice-chairman, a treasurer and a secretary were selected in the collaboration committee to form a head of staff. Flemming Jordt, who had acted as the main spokesperson of the committee, was since elected to become the first chairman of the collaboration committee in the new club in Southern Jutland. Assessment meetings have been held every six months involving the boards of the parent clubs, alternating between meeting rooms in the four respective cities.

=== 2004–2005: License and squad-building ===
The former professional footballer and club captain for Danish Superliga side Esbjerg fB, Jørgen Kristensen was announced as the first player of the merger club, as well as its first captain. Besides playing, he would also become part of the collaboration committee on behalf of Ballum IF, where he was elected vice-chairman. Otto Christensen from Bredebro was simultaneously presented as the first team head coach. Carsten Jørgensen and Torben Baun were appointed coaches for the new common under-19 team, which would play its inaugural season in the highest youth division of DBU Jutland.

As a result of the positive output of the extraordinary general assemblies, all parent clubs involved in the merger decided to support the Tønder SF Serie 3 (eighth tier) team in the latter half of the 2004 season, and encouraged their best players to strengthen the Tønder SF team which enabled a turnaround and catch up of the leading clubs in the division, and participation in the playoff games for promotion to Serie 2 (seventh tier). At the summer break Tønder SF was only seven points short from clinching a promotion spot and ten points from first place. Players who had decided to help the team included former SC Weiche Flensburg 08 players Jørgen Kristensen, Søren Gram and Jannick Clausen, as well as Søren Lund and Morten Gram, who had also formerly competed at higher levels but now played for Ballum IF and Løgum IF, respectively. Prior to the merger entering into force, the Tønder SF first team reached promotion to Serie 2 in the 2004 season by winning its Serie 3 poule, in which another of the parent clubs, Bredebro IF, also competed. First place and the subsequent promotion was secured in October 2004 at Løgumkloster Stadion in an 11–2 win over Broager UIF/Boldklub Frem Egernsund who had already suffered relegation from the division at that point. The win meant the second consecutive promotion for Tønder SF since the club's relegation to Serie 4 in the 2002 season. Thus, in FC Sydvest 05's inaugural season, the 2005 season, its first team would compete in the DBU Jutland Serie 2 after adopting Tønder SF's sporting license; the club competing at highest level of the parent clubs. Tønder SF formerly spent multiple seasons in the Denmark Series (fourth highest division) and with two second places in 1977 and 1978 they even came close to reaching promotion to the third tier, which was then known as the Danish 3rd Division (today known as 2nd Division due to the introduction of the Danish Superliga which replaced the former 1st Division in 1991).

Shortly after the end of the 2004 season, open workouts were held in Bredebro during a span of four days, where 45 players from the four parent clubs as well as other regional players had the opportunity to be selected for the first team, which was to represent FC Sydvest 05 starting January 2005. This foundation, consisting of 26 players, was reduced to 18–22 players right before the winter transfer window. The new first team squad met for its first training session under the FC Sydvest 05 name on 29 January 2005 at the grounds in Bredebro, whereafter they played their first pre-season friendlies in February. Every Sydvest 05 player was still attached to their respective parent club, and were expected to play competitive matches for these in case the player was not selected for the Sydvest 05 match. On the other hand, the first team players of the parent clubs were also readily available for selection for Sydvest 05, where they played competitively on a voluntary basis.

In the year following the merger, Bredebro IF and Ballum IF combined their first teams ahead of the 2006 season. During its first season, it would compete under the name Bredebro IF, which would become "Ballum/Bredebro" in 2007. This came into being due to a common ambition and low association amongst its senior sides. Bredebro IF suffered relegation to Serie 5 in the fall of 2005, while Ballum IF chose to withdraw their first team from competition. Former chairman of Tønder SF, Gunnar Jordt, stated in June 2009 to the regional newspaper JydskeVestkysten that one of the upsides to collaborating in the FC Sydvest 05 structure had been the release of new resources, which meant that the separate clubs did not have a responsibility for their best first team players anymore. Instead, the focus had shifted into building more competitive youth academies.

=== 2005: Year zero, top of the group and promotion ===
The first official game in competition for FC Sydvest 05 was a DBU Jutland Serie 2 (seventh highest division) home match against local rivals Skodborg Idrætsforening on 2 April 2005 at Løgumkloster Stadion in front of more than 300 spectatators, a match which was won 4–3. The first goal occurred after 11 minutes, when FC Sydvest 05's attacking midfielder Jannick Clausen, originally part of Løgum IF, scored directly from a corner. The new under-19 team from Sydvest 05, which would later evolve into two separate teams, played their first official match two hours before the start of the first team game in a matchup in the highest youth division against the Kolding IF under-19 side, also at Løgumkloster Stadion. Except losses to Hviding Idrætsforening in the beginning of the season and to Holsted forenede Boldklubber during the latter part of the season, respectively, the first team managed to secure points in all matches during the 2005 season. At the end of their inaugural season in competition, FC Sydvest 05 were crowned champions of Serie 2 which resulted in direct promotion to Series 1 (sixth highest division) of DBU Jutland for the upcoming 2006 season. The average attendance during home games was around 170 spectators during the spring season. Jannick Clausen became the 2005 top scorer of the team with 19 goals after appearing in all competitive matches for Sydvest 05. As a result of ending top of the group, the club automatically qualified for the Jutland Championships for Serie 2 teams, where they entered the quarter-finals. Their first and only match in this tournament was a 1–4 home loss at Bredebro Stadion to Stensballe IK on 30 October 2005, their only goal being scored by Jørgen Kristensen.

FC Sydvest 05 played their first cup match on 10 May 2005 in the preliminary rounds of the Danish Cup organised by the regional football associations for the 2005–06 season. The club's position in the Serie 2-table (DBU Jutland) meant that its first team would face fellow Southern Jutland side Bov IF in the local third round of the competition at Padborg Stadion in the border town of Padborg. The match ended in a 5–2 win for Sydvest 05. In the local fourth round, the club faced Serie 4 club Kolding Freja in an 8–5 win, which was followed up in a fifth round match against local rivals Team Tinglev which ended in a 2–1 win. The cup run came to an end in the following round after a 3–7 home loss to Serie 1 club SUB Sønderborg.

=== 2006–2009: Competing in the Jutland Serie 1 ===
Five points in five matches became a fact after the beginning of FC Sydvest 05's tenure in the Serie 1, and at the end of the spring season the team was placed in the lower league table, but above the relegation zone. Where the objective had been promotion during the first season of the merger, stabilisation in Serie 1 was the key goal of the 2006 season, which was met. The team eventually finished above mid-table in the division, nine points from promotion to Jyllandsserien and 11 points clear of relegation to Serie 2, after a formidable second half of the season. Following the first two seasons, head coach Otto Christensen, after failing to reach an agreement on a contract extension with the collaboration committee, announced his departure from the merger club. The temporal aspect of the position – having to attend all competitive matches of the separate clubs from the merger – as well as having to reach agreements with the separate boards on decisions concerning FC Sydvest 05, were cited to be the reason for Otto Christensen's own wish to resign. Kim Munch was presented as head coach of the club at a press conference before the home match at Tønder Stadion against Fredericia fF on 10 September 2006. Chairman of Sydvest 05, Flemming Jordt, explained the decision by stating that "[we] wanted a coach from outside [the club], who had no knowledge of our players in advance, and [someone who] possessed the right qualifications". Munch had undergone the extended goalkeeper seminar of the Danish Football Union and a number of UEFA B Licence courses, which is the equivalent of a Danish head coach diploma. The formal coaching transition was to be completed after the last match of the season on 21 October 2006, and would go into full effect prior to the 2007 season. Knud Erik Chrestensen, who had functioned as assistant coach from the 2006 season and as an occasional defender under the former head coach, continued as the assistant coach under Munch.

In the spring of 2007, Flemming Jordt had to scale down on his involvement in FC Sydvest 05 and therefore passed on the torch of chairman of the collaboration committee to Børge Nielsen, who had up until that point acted as representative of Tønder SF Fodbold. In the following winter break 2007–08, the former division player and team captain for Sydvest 05, Jørgen Kristensen retired in order to become head coach of Tønder SF first team, which at the time competed in Serie 3. His vice-chairmanship of FC Sydvest 05 and his role as representative of the collaboration committee for Ballum IF was retained. The 2007 season started out with a streak of five matches without a loss, after which a period of instability took hold, before ending the season fifth place in the Serie 1 table after striking a balance in wins and losses. The third season following the merger as well as Kim Munch's first season as head coach was marked by injuries, and a total of 25 players were utilised including four different goalkeepers. Shortly after finishing the 2007 season, Sydvest 05 participated in the post-season friendly tournament Brede Cup, in which the team was crowned as champions.

The 2006–07 edition of the Danish Cup was a short-term affair for the club, as it was knocked out during the initial stages of the tournament by Serie 3 side Hjordkær U&IF in an away game, in what would become Sydvest 05's only cup match that season. The next edition of the Danish Cup was to be more successful for the club, advancing from the regional rounds and reaching the national rounds – the main part – of the tournament, in which clubs from the highest three divisions are automatically qualified. Sydvest 05 achieved this feat by knocking out Serie 2 side Aabenraa Boldklub (0–1), Serie 3 club Broager UI (0–4) in the second qualification round, as well as Jutland Series team Esbjerg IF 92 (7–4). After a 5–2 away win over fellow Southern Jutland side Vojens Bold- og Idrætsklub in the first round of the 2007–08 Danish Cup, FC Sydvest 05's best run in the cup ended abruptly in the second round. On 29 August 2007, playing at home in Ballum, the club lost 0–10 (0–5 at half-time) to Danish Superliga club AC Horsens in front of a record crowd of 1,100 spectators, in what was described as the biggest match in club history. Over the course of next three years, 2008–09, 2008–09 (did not participate) and 2010–11, the club was not able to advance from the regional rounds organised as part of DBU Jutland and into the main rounds as organised by the nationwide DBU Tournaments.

In January 2008, former head coach of Tønder SF Fodbold, Erik Tønder, was appointed to become the new assistant coach under head coach Kim Munch. In the period up to the start of the 2008 spring season, the team was strengthen by two players with experience from the higher divisions: defender Rune Koertz from former Danish 1st Division (second highest division) club Aarhus Fremad and Christian Roost who had formerly been under contract at Varde IF of the Danish 2nd Division (third highest division). The short spring season in Serie 1 began with four successive wins, which sent Sydvest 05 to the top of the table. This was, however, only temporary, as two losses in week 5 and 7 of the competition – at home to Aabenraa Boldklub and to the merger team Hatting/Torsted Fodboldungdom, respectively – meant that Hatting/Torsted Fodboldungdom would later overtake FC Sydvest 05's first place and thus reach promotion to Jyllandsserien ahead of Sydvest 05, who finished second. With two rounds left of the regular season, DBU Jutland announced that only the group winner would gain promotion, instead of the usual first place and second place. FC Sydvest 05 competed for first place until the last week of the competition, where they were dependent on results by other teams to reach promotion, which did in the end not come to fruition. 23 players came into action for the first team throughout the short spring season.

The board decided that the main objective for the 2008–09 season was promotion to the Jutland Series. The first 11 matches of the season resulted in seven wins, two draws and two losses, which meant that the club went on winter break at second place in the league table, five points behind local rivals Aabenraa Boldklub and in place for promotion. Results in the remainder of the competition secured promotion for FC Sydvest 05 to the Jutland Series, the top regional tier and the fifth-highest division overall in the Danish football league system. This was reached by ending second in Serie 1, only behind Aabenraa Boldklub. Compared to the first part of the season the first team only lost a few important players, whereas an influx of players with experience from higher divisions, such as midfielder Frej Brockhatting and striker Esben Jacobsen, helped improve the quality of the team. A 5–0 loss in an away game to Esbjerg fB was cancelled by the DBU disciplinary committee after Esbjerg had fielded four ineligible players, resulting in three points for Sydvest 05. A top-two matchup in the third to last round of the season against Aabenraa Boldklub ended in a 2–2 draw, which became the second point loss during the spring – the other one being a loss in the local derby against Egen UI from Guderup in the spring premiere on 4 April 2009, in front of 352 spectators. With two wins over Vejen Sports Forening (2–3) and Kolding Boldklub (6–3), Sydvest 05 secured promotion. As promotion was reached, assistant Erik Tønder left the club, and was replaced by under-19 coach Peter Jepsen ahead of the new season. In total, 23 players were utilised during the 2008–09 season for FC Sydvest 05.

=== 2009–2010: Jutland Series and promotion playoffs ===
The newly promoted FC Sydvest 05 initiated their first season in the Jutland Series (group 4) with a premiere match on 16 August 2009 at home in Tønder against FC Horsens, to whom they initially lost 1–0. However, the result was later changed to a win for Sydvest 05 by the DBU disciplinary committee. Another seven points were hauled in, in matches against SUB Sønderborg (draw), FC Fredericia reserves (win) and Sædding-Guldager Idrætsforening (win) which placed Sydvest at top of the table in their Jutland Series group. Only three wins over the next 10 games, however, meant that the club suffered a drop in table and ended in fourth place. Despite a loss to Aabenraa Boldklub in the last regular season match of the Jutland Series, Sydvest 05 qualified for the promotion play-off group to the Denmark Series (fourth highest division) in the spring of 2010, as other results had a positive outcome for the club (SUB Sønderborg drew versus Sædding-Guldager IF).

The then 19-year-old Thomas Mikkelsen, who had arrived at FC Sydvest 05 from parent club Bredebro IF became the team top-scorer with 11 goals in 14 league appearances during the short fall season of 2009, became one of the first players to depart the club in favour of a higher division club, when he accepted a six-month professional contract from second division club Vejle Boldklub after a successful trial. In January 2010, the club presented four new signings with a total of 350 appearances in the higher divisions and 50 appearances in the Danish Superliga. These were defender and former SønderjyskE-captain Jacob Stolberg, midfielder Thomas Christensen, forward Kim Nielsen, and striker Karsten Viborg, who arrived to strengthen the first-team squad ahead of the promotion play-offs in 2010. Less than a month later, in February 2010, 26-year-old former Silkeborg IF and Sønderjyske-goalkeeper, Steffen Christiansen joined. In the same month, assistant coach Peter Jepsen left the position to become assistant at Aabenraa Boldklub, and as his replacement was appointed 37-year-old Stinus Jensen who had experience as a player for SønderjyskE and had made Superliga-appearances for Esbjerg fB.

Chairman of board	Period	Parent club	Ref.
Flemming Jordt	(2004–2007)	Bredebro IF
Børge Nielsen	(2007–2010)	Tønder SF
Hans Pilegaard	(2010–2016)	Tønder SF
Henrik Hansen	(2016–2017)	—
Knud Mylin	(2017–2018)	—
Anders Lund	(2018)	—
Thorsten Simonsen	(2018–now)	—

Prior to the promotion play-offs, which began in the spring of 2010, head coach Kim Munch proclaimed that promotion to the Denmark Series, the fourth highest division in Denmark, was the objective, by reaching either first or second place in the table of group 2 of the Jutland Series. However, after seven matches Sydvest 05 only managed to obtain six points, and the declared objective was disregarded. Afterwards, the team went on a six-game winning streak towards the end of the competition. Promotion to the Denmark Series was secured with a 2–1 away win over Aarhus-side Viby IF in the penultimate match of the season, which was enough for third place in the league table. Thomas Christensen became top-scorer for the club with 11 goals in the promotion group. At a press conference at main sponsor Tønder Bank it was announced that chairman of board and representative of Tønder SF in the collaboration committee, Børge Nielsen, was replaced by Hans Pilegaard, also of Tønder SF. During the summer of 2010, the first team played an exhibition match at Løgumkloster Stadion against the Southern Schleswig national team (also known as "the Danish national team south of the border" in Danish media), which consisted of players from the Danish minority of Southern Schleswig and from the first teams of Danish clubs in Southern Schleswig. The match ended in a 3–0 win for FC Sydvest 05.

=== 2010–2012: Denmark Series ===
Prior to the 2010–11 season of the Denmark Series, FC Sydvest 05 was placed in group 2, where seven of the 14 clubs were from the island of Funen, six clubs had promoted alongside Sydvest 05 from the regional tiers, and six participants were reserve teams of clubs from the higher divisions. Former club captain Jørgen Kristensen, who had coached parent club Bredebro IF's Serie 5 team in the spring of 2010 and before that coached the first team of Tønder SF Fodbold between 2008 and 2009, became assistant coach for FC Sydvest 05 ahead of the new season. The first match of the season was on 14 August 2010 at home in Tønder against Odense-side Fjordager IF which ended in a 1–1 draw. The first win of the season came in early September at Tønder Stadion against Ringsted IF, which would prove to be the first in a series of four consecutive wins during the month of September. Halfway during the season, Sydvest 05 was placed seventh in the league table after ending the last five matches of the fall with four draws. Before the beginning of the season, head coach Kim Munch stated that he would probably end his tenure has FC Sydvest 05-coach after the 2010–11 season, where his contract expired. In October 2010, however, Munch chose to sign a contract extension. Bjarne Hansen also replaced Jørgen Kristensen as assistant coach during the 2010–11 winter break. In October 2010, the collaboration committee also launched a new five-year plan, where the declared objective was promotion to the Danish 2nd Division (third highest division of Danish football) within the next five years, in continuation of the club's wish to become the football-flagship of Tønder Municipality as well as an alternative to more peripheral first team players in the professional divisions. Despite a strong second half to the season, which included a 4–0 away win over Næsby BK, a 4–0 home win over B 1921 and a 6–0 home win over Kolding IF, Sydvest 05 ended in fourth place in the competition, five points short of a promotion that would have meant that the team reached their overall target within one year.

On 30 March 2011, former Odense Boldklub player Ulrik Pedersen was announced at the new first team head coach, replacing Kim Munch from the start of the 2011–12 season. His first match in charge of the first team was the 2011–12 season opener at home in Tønder against Døllefjelde-Musse IF, which Sydvest 05 won 4–1. At the winter break, halfway through the season, the club had won nine matches out of 13 total. Another strong showing during the short spring season meant that FC Sydvest 05 could secure promotion with only one point in the away matchup against Odense Kammeraternes Sportsklub (OKS) on 2 June 2012, four matches before the end of the season. A 4–0 away win meant that the club reached their goal of playing in the Danish third highest division in only two seasons, by ending second in the group, only behind Middelfart G&BK. Following the historic achievement, head coach Ulrik Pedersen likened the feeling of reaching promotion to his experiences when Odense Boldklub knocked out Real Madrid in the 1994–95 UEFA Cup, known is Denmark as the "Miracle in Madrid".

=== 2012–: Danish third highest division ===
FC Sydvest 05 started their 2012–13 campaign on 4 August 2012 away at Riisvangen Stadion in Aarhus N where the club faced former Danish Superliga side Aarhus Fremad. The match ended in a 4–0 loss to the club from Southern Jutland.

== Collaboration with Tønder Sportscollege ==
Tønder IdrætsCollege (TIC) was established prior to the fall season of 2005 after an initiative by Tønder Municipality. After having first focused on handball, another branch focusing on football was initiated at the after school program in Tønder. This came to fruition through a collaboration with the football department of North German club SC Weiche Flensburg 08 from the federal state of Schleswig-Holstein, as well as the regional Danish clubs Tønder SF Fodbold and FC Sydvest 05. As collaborative partner for the sports-college, Tønder SF Fodbold and thereby Sydvest 05, participate in educational programmes and assist in finding qualified football coaches and visiting coaches, who are made available for the students. The education is a three-year programme equivalent to an upper secondary school, combining physical education and courses/professional career guidance. FC Sydvest 05 is responsible for educating the individual coaches, who are sent on seminars paid by the club budget. As football became part of the programme, the school changed its name to Tønder SportsCollege (TSC) in 2007.

== Stadium ==
The merger between the four regional clubs meant that Sydvest 05 has not played its home games at one specific ground. On the other hand, the concept has been spreading activities and alternating between home grounds of the clubs involved in the merger, in order to accommodate all parties of the cooperative. Tønder Stadion and Løgumkloster Stadion have alternated as official home fields in regards to competitive matches in the Jyllandsserien and Denmark Series. Bredebro has traditionally facilitated training grounds during the first years of the merger. The under-19 and under-17 teams have practiced in Tønder, Bredebro and Løgumkloster, respectively, while playing competitive matches at home at Bredebro Stadion and Tønder Stadion. None of these grounds have floodlights or stands, but have the capacity to house 1,000–2,000 standing spectators around the pitch. In the event of larger football gatherings, such as the Danish Cup fixture against AC Horsens in August 2007, mobile stands have been installed which have been able to hold 400 seated spectators. During the first season in the Denmark Series, the club sought a dispensation from DBU, the Danish Football Union due to Tønder Stadion having the wrong dimensions as prescribed by the Danish football codex. This meant that four of the six matches of the fall season were played at Løgum Stadion, which was the only ground capable of having a field the length of 110 m between the touchlines per the DBU requirements.

As a rule, home games in the spring season have been played at the pitch of Løgum IF by Klosterhallen in Løgumkloster, while home matches during the fall season have taken place at the ground of Tønder Stadion by Tønder Hallerne at Sønderlandevej in Tønder per the club agreement of splitting home grounds. In its debut season in Serie 2 in 2005, the first five matches were thus played at home in Løgumkloster, whereas the latter part of the season was moved to its home ground in Tønder. This internal rotational policy of home grounds was maintained in the following seasons, where Sydvest 05 competed in Serie 1 and in the Jutland Series (2005–2010). Planned home games have, however, been moved from Tønder Stadion to Løgumkloster, Bredebro or Ballum due to aforementioned circumstances regarding the pitch. For example, a number of matches were moved in the 2008–09 season because of heavy summer rains which partly flooded the pitch at low-lying Tønder Stadion, located close to the Vidå Creek. An exhibition match against SønderjyskE in the summer of 2007 was postponed due to the poor condition of the pitch in Tønder. Four out of five total league games planned to be played at Tønder Stadion were instead to be held at Bredebro Stadion during the fall of 2009; during the fall of 2009, the last match of the season was moved from Tønder to Bredebro; in the spring of 2010 four matches were moved from Tønder to Løgumkloster: all due to poor weather conditions. The regional qualifiers for the 2005–06 Danish Cup as well as the quarter-final appearance in the Jutland Serie 2 championship (seventh tier), was played at Bredebro Stadion (the pitches at Bredebro Hallerne) in Bredebro, where the first-team training sessions and pre-season friendlies would also be held, apart from a few detours at the artificial turf pitch in Skærbæk Fritidscenter during the winter months. Home cup games have since 2007 been held at Ballum IF's ground close to the shores of the Wadden Sea.

== Players ==
As of 29 April 2020.

=== Current squad ===
Note: Flags indicate national team as defined under FIFA eligibility rules; some limited exceptions apply. Players may hold more than one non-FIFA nationality.

No.	Pos.	Nation	Player
1	GK	(Denmark) DEN	Mads Kikkenborg
2	DF	(Denmark) DEN	Emil Ankersen
7	FW	(Denmark) DEN	Marco Hansen
8	DF	(Denmark) DEN	Christian Roost
9	FW	(Kosovo) KOS	Fiton Duguti
11	MF	(Denmark) DEN	Nils Priisholm
12	MF	(Poland) POL	Bartosz Danowski
13	MF	(Denmark) DEN	Kasper Sørensen
14	DF	(England) ENG	Joe Guinchard
15	DF	(Denmark) DEN	David Easter

No.	Pos.	Nation	Player
16	MF	(Turkey) TUR	Burak Bozdemir
17	MF	(United States) USA	Howard Miller
18	MF	(Denmark) DEN	Lasse Seistrup Carlsen
19	FW	(Albania) ALB	Ardit Murati
21	DF	(Denmark) DEN	Christian Degn
22	DF	(Denmark) DEN	Deniz Korkmaz
23	MF	(Denmark) DEN	Morten Beck
26	MF	(Denmark) DEN	Jeppe Paulsen
—	GK	(Denmark) DEN	Jannick Andersen
