= Ringkøbing IF =

Danish football club

- Full name: Ringkøbing Idrætsforening
- Founded: 29 March 1900
- Ground: Green Arena, Ringkøbing
- Capacity: 1,200
- Chairman: Henning Bro
- Manager: Nicolai Wael
- League: Denmark Series
- 2023–24: Denmark Series – Group 4, 6th of 10; Relegation round West, 2nd of 10
| Home colours | Away colours |

Ringkøbing Idrætsforening (Danish pronunciation: [ˈʁeŋˌkʰøˀpe̝ŋ]) is an association football club based in the town of Ringkøbing, West Jutland, Denmark, that competes in the Denmark Series, the fifth tier of the Danish football league system. Founded in 1900, it is shortly known as 'RIF' and affiliated to the DBU Jutland, the regional body of football in Jutland. The team plays its home matches at Green Arena, where it has been based since 1999.

The club's history includes numerous promotions and relegations, and some spells of sustained success. It was perhaps most prominent between in the Interwar period when it was a regional powerhouse, winning Jutland championships in the A-series (third regional tier) in 1920 and 1935.

== History ==
Ringkøbing IF was relatively successful in the first decades after its foundation in 1900. In 1935, the club won the Jutland championships in the A-tier, after beating Ølgod (5–3), Holstebro BK (4–3) and finally Vejle Boldklub (3–1) in the finals. The latter was played at Herning Stadion on 4 June, and the result meant that Ringkøbing promoted to the JBU Mellemrækken, the second regional division at that time.

After some decades of struggles, Ringkøbing IF promoted to Series 1, the second highest regional tier in 1960, after a 6–2 win over league table rivals Grønbjerg IF. Some years later, however, the club would suffer relegation to the lower tiers.

Some time would pass before Ringkøbing would reach the second regional tier again. Only in 1985 would the club reach Series 1 again, after finishing second in the Series 2 group.

In the 2011–12 season, Ringkøbing IF secured promotion to the Danish 2nd Division, the third tier of Danish football, in the last round of competition by winning 2–4 away over local rivals Holstebro BK. This was the first time in club history that they reached the divisions; the three highest national leagues of Denmark.
