= Brabrand IF =

Danish football club

- Full name: Brabrand Idrætsforening
- Short name: BIF
- Founded: 1934; 92 years ago
- Ground: Brabrand Stadion, Brabrand, Aarhus
- Capacity: 1,000
- Chairman: Harrie Horsmans
- Manager: Michèle Demontis
- League: Danish 2nd Division
- 2025–26: Danish 2nd Division, 10th of 12
Home colours	Away colours

Brabrand Idrætsforening is a Danish multi-sports club located in Brabrand in the western suburbs of Aarhus. They are best known for their football team, which currently compete in the Danish 2nd Division, the third tier of the Danish football league system.

== Players ==
=== Current squad ===
As of 6 September 2026

Note: Flags indicate national team as defined under FIFA eligibility rules; some limited exceptions apply. Players may hold more than one non-FIFA nationality.

No.	Pos.	Nation	Player
1	GK	DEN	Jonathan Hutters
2	DF	DEN	Tobias Olesen
3	DF	DEN	Rasmus Kirkegaard
4	DF	DEN	Sebastian Boldt Ernst
5	DF	DEN	Simon Vesterbæk
6	MF	DEN	Rasmus Juul
7	DF	DEN	Magnus Kjellerup
8	DF	DEN	Jonas Moos Pedersen
9	FW	DEN	Elias Astola
10	DF	DEN	Mikkel Frandsen
11	FW	DEN	Mathias Laursen
12	DF	DEN	Michael Pedersen
13	DF	DEN	Lucas Møller
14	DF	DEN	Frederik Jørgensen

No.	Pos.	Nation	Player
15	DF	DEN	Jonatan Bro
16	FW	DEN	Johannes Arbøl
17	MF	DEN	Chance Mihigo
19	MF	NGR	Ekemini Ime (on loan from AGF)
20	MF	DEN	Marcus Tøfting
21	MF	DEN	Jonas Berwald
22	MF	DEN	Henrik Borup
24	GK	DEN	Oliver Bjerregaard
27	FW	KOR	Hyun-ho Song
28	DF	DEN	Søren Møller
29	DF	DEN	Jesper Brinck
30	FW	DEN	Oscar Mandrup (on loan from AC Horsens)
77	FW	DEN	Frederik Munk
-	DF	DEN	Sune Balle

== See also ==
- Brabrand IF (women's team)
