= Boldklubben Avarta =

Association football club in Denmark

BK Avarta
- Full name: Boldklubben Avarta
- Nickname: De Grønne (The Green)
- Founded: 1953; 73 years ago (as Rødovrevejens; Boldklub)
- Ground: Tømrermester Jim Jensens Park, Rødovre
- Capacity: 6,000
- Chairman: Kenneth M. Pedersen
- Manager: Benny Gall
- League: 3rd Division
- 2023–24: 3rd Division, 5th of 12
Home colours	Away colours

Boldklubben Avarta is a Danish professional football club currently competing in the 3rd division, which ranks as the fourth-highest league in the country. Avarta's home ground is Tømrermester Jim Jensens Park in Rødovre, Copenhagen, which has a capacity of 6,000.

== History ==
Boldklubben Avarta was founded on 20 January 1953 as "Rødovrevejens Boldklub". In the first year the club's home was Rødovre Stadium, but since 1960 it has been the Espelundens Idrætsanlæg.

The team was relegated from the Danish 2nd Division East following the 2005–06 season, but it spent only two seasons in the Denmark Series Pool 1 before gaining promotion back into the Danish 2nd Division East for the 2008–09 season.

== Squad ==
As of 31 May 2025

Note: Flags indicate national team as defined under FIFA eligibility rules; some limited exceptions apply. Players may hold more than one non-FIFA nationality.

No.	Pos.	Nation	Player
1	GK	DEN	Thomas Gall
2	DF	DEN	Daniel Thorup
3	DF	DEN	Sebastian Kroner
4	DF	DEN	Niklas Andreasen
5	DF	SRB	Aleksandar Spasojević
6	MF	DEN	Mikkel Eslund
7	MF	DEN	Sebastian Brodersen
8	MF	DEN	Marco Balck
9	FW	DEN	Aleksandar Lazarevic
10	MF	DEN	Michael Lumb
11	FW	DEN	Marco Vinterberg
12	DF	DEN	Luca Mattey

No.	Pos.	Nation	Player
13	FW	DEN	Hakim Sighaoui
14	MF	DEN	Tobias Lerche-Henriksen
15	FW	DEN	Nikola Bursać
17	FW	DEN	Mads Walter
18	FW	DEN	Niklas Kristiansen
19	DF	DEN	Karl-Emil Østergaard
20	DF	DEN	Simon Ustrup
21	FW	DEN	Abdoulie Manneh
23	FW	NOR	Modouba Coker
30	GK	DEN	Tim Lund
90	FW	DEN	Philip Nielsen
