= 2025–26 Danish Cup =

Danish football tournament season

Pokalen (The Cup)
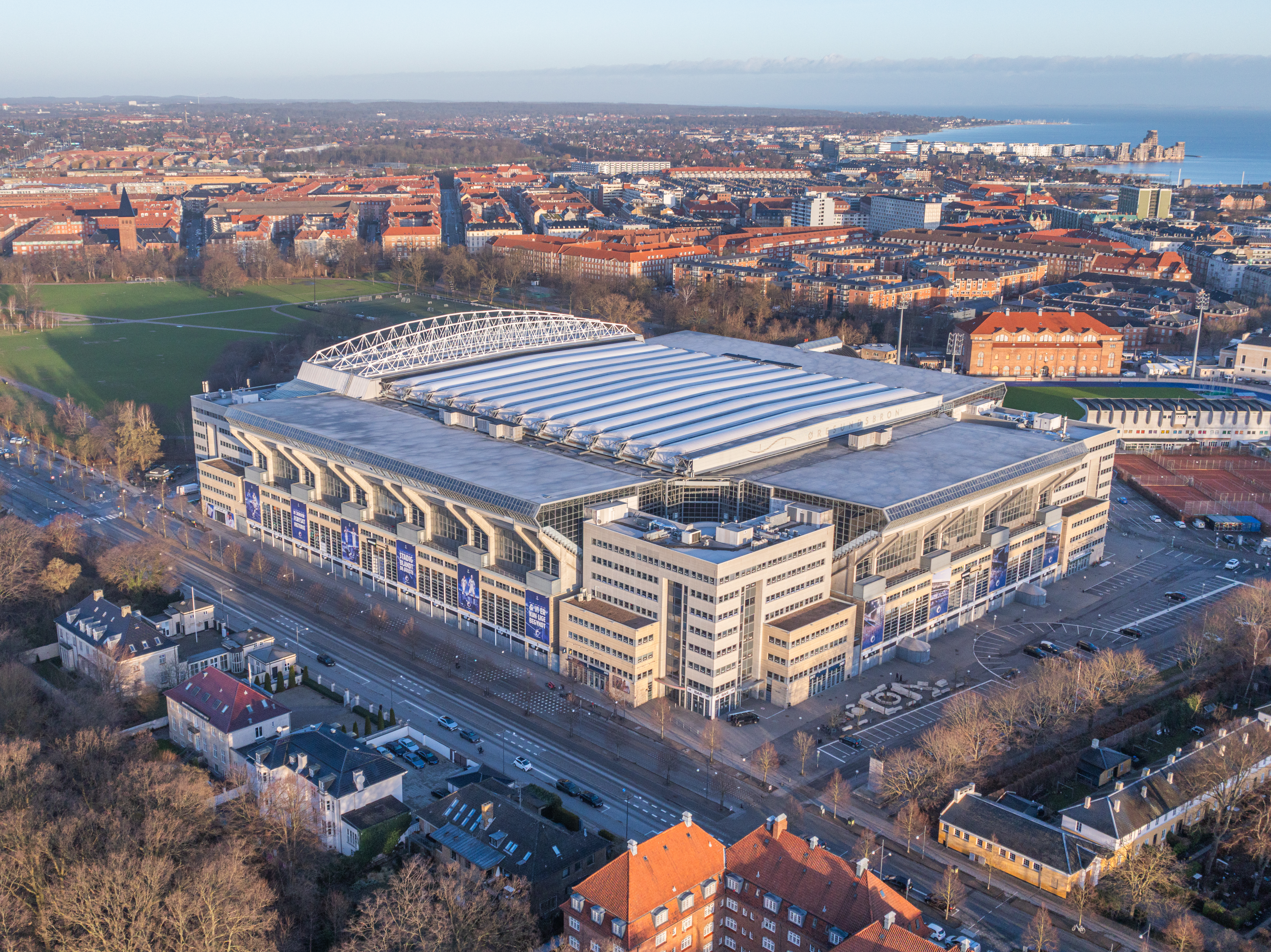
- Parken Stadium hosted the final

Tournament details
- Country: Denmark
- Teams: 104

Final positions
- Champions: Midtjylland (3rd title)
- Runners-up: Copenhagen

Tournament statistics
- Matches played: 109
- Goals scored: 444 (4.07 per match)
- Attendance: 35,485 (326 per match)
- Top goal scorers: Júnior Brumado; Youssoufa Moukoko; (6 goals each)
- All statistics correct as of 14 May 2026.

The 2025–26 Danish Cup, also known as Oddset Pokalen for sponsorship reasons, was the 72nd season of the Danish Cup competition.

The winner of the competition earned a place in the first qualifying round of the 2026–27 UEFA Europa League.

Copenhagen were the defending champions but were defeated by Mitdjylland in the final at Parken Stadium on 14 May 2026.

Times up to 25 October 2025 and from 30 March 2025 are CEST (UTC+2). Times from 26 October 2025 to 28 March 2026 are CET (UTC+1).

== Participants ==
104 teams competed for the Danish Cup. All teams from the top four divisions 2024–25 season were automatically entered, while 56 teams qualified through preliminary cups held by the regional associations.

== Structure ==
92 teams participated in the first round, coming from all levels of competition, including the two relegated teams from the 2024–25 Danish Superliga. The two promoted teams from the 2024–25 Danish 1st Division and teams placed 7th to 10th from the 2024–25 Danish Superliga joined in the second round, while the top six teams from the 2024–25 Danish Superliga entered in the third round.

| Round | Date | Number of fixtures | Clubs remaining | New entries this round | Teams entering this round |
|---|---|---|---|---|---|
| Qualifying matches | | | → 56 | | Danmarks serien teams and Teams from Tier 6 to 9 |
| First round | 5–7 August 2025 | 46 | 92 → 46 | 36 | 12 BetiniaLiga teams 12 2nd Division teams 12 3rd Division teams |
| Second round | 2–4 September 2025 | 26 | 52 → 26 | 6 | 6 Superliga teams (7-12) |
| Third round | 23–25 September 2025 | 16 | 32 → 16 | 6 | 6 Superliga teams (1-6) |
| Fourth round | 28–30 October 2025 | 8 | 16 → 8 | None | None |
| Quarter-finals | 2–4 December/13–14 December 2025 | 4(8) | 8 → 4 | None | None |
| Semi-finals | 11–12 February/7–8 March 2026 | 2(4) | 4 → 2 | None | None |
| Final | 14 May 2025 | 1 | 2 → 1 | None | None |

== First round ==
The Draw was held 8 July 2025.

In the first round of the tournament, 92 teams competed, including 56 clubs from the various levels of the Denmark Series and below, all teams from 2024–25 Danish 3rd Division and 2024–25 Danish 2nd Division, the 3rd-12th placed teams from the 2024–25 Danish 1st Division and the 11th-12th placed teams from the 2024–25 Danish Superliga. Teams are split into three regions:

- Zealand/Bornholm/Falster/Lolland
- Fyn/Southern Jutland
- Middle/Northern Jutland

Number of teams per tier still in competition
| Dansh Superliga (tier 1) | Danish 1st Division (tier 2) | 2. Division; (tier 3) | 3. Division; (tier 4) | Danmarksserien (tier 5) | Regionalseries (tier 6) | Serie 1, 2 & 3 (tier 7, 8 & 9) | Total |
|---|---|---|---|---|---|---|---|
| 12 / 12 | 12 / 12 | 12 / 12 | 11 / 11 | 18 / 18 | 19 / 19 | 20 / 20 | 104 / 104 |

=== Zealand/Bornholm/Falster/Lolland ===
| 29 July 2025 | Hvidovre (2) | 4–3 (a.e.t.) | HB Køge (2) | Pro Ventilation Arena |
| 18:30 |

| 2 August 2025 | NB Bornholm (6) | 0–2 | GVI (5) | Nexø Stadium |
| 14:00 |

| 5 August 2025 | Ishøj IF (3) | 2–1 (a.e.t.) | Fremad Amager (3) | Ishøj Idrætscenter |
| 18:00 |

| 5 August 2025 | Listrup (7) | 0–7 | BK Skjold (5) | Listrup anlæg |
| 18:00 |

| 5 August 2025 | Frem Sakskøbing (6) | 1–6 | Sundby BK (4) | JP Air Tech Arena |
| 18:00 |

| 5 August 2025 | Ringsted IF (5) | 7–6 (a.e.t.) | Nykøbing FC (4) | Ringsted Stadium |
| 18:00 |

| 5 August 2025 | Boldklubben Viktoria (7) | 0–5 | Hillerød (2) | Fælledeparken |
| 18:00 |

| 5 August 2025 | FC Rudersdal (6) | 1–3 | AB (3) | Vedbæk Stadium |
| 18:00 |

| 5 August 2025 | Helsingør (3) | 0–1 | Lyngby (2) | Helsingør Stadion |
| 18:00 |

| 5 August 2025 | Gørslev IF (5) | 2–1 | Næstved BK (3) | Gørslev Stadion |
| 18:00 |

| 5 August 2025 | Ålholm IF (9) | 0–10 | B.93 (2) | Ålholm Skole |
| 18:00 |

| 5 August 2025 | Tårnby FF (5) | 0–1 | FA 2000 (4) | Vestamager Idrætsanlæg |
| 18:00 |

| 5 August 2025 | FC ESPM (8) | 1–2 | Tune IF (6) | Valby Idrætspark |
| 18:00 |

| 5 August 2025 | Kastrup Boldklub (6) | 0–2 | FC Roskilde (3) | Kastrup Idrætsanlæg |
| 18:30 |

| 5 August 2025 | Fredensborg BI (5) | 1–3 | HIK (3) | Fredensborg Stadium |
| 18:30 |

| 5 August 2025 | Raklev GI (6) | 2–0 | Avarta (5) | Røsnæs Hallen |
| 19:00 |

| 6 August 2025 | Husum Boldklub (6) | 1–6 | Holbæk B&I (4) | Husumparken |
| 18:00 |

| 6 August 2025 | Allerød FK (5) | 2–4 (a.e.t.) | Brønshøj BK (4) | Allerød Idrætspark |
| 18:00 |

| 6 August 2025 | LSF (5) | 0–0 (a.e.t.) (3–1 p) | Frem (4) | Sydbank Arena |
| 18:30 |

| 6 August 2025 | Øresund klubfodbold (8) | 0–5 | Vanløse IF (4) | Klævermarkens Idrætsanlæg |
| 19:00 |

| 7 August 2025 | FC Kalundborg (8) | 1–0 | Stenløse BK (7) | Munkesø Stadium |
| 18:00 |

| 7 August 2025 | Brøndby Strand IK (7) | 2–1 | Nerashté Ballerup (6) | Langbjerg Skole |
| 18:00 |

| 7 August 2025 | Vallensbæk IF (7) | 1–7 | FC Nakskov (6) | Vallensbæk Idrætscenter |
| 19:00 |

=== Fyn/Southern Jutland ===
| 5 August 2025 | Bramming B (6) | 3–2 | SfB Oure FA (5) | Skjern Bank Arena |
| 18:00 |

| 5 August 2025 | Boldklubben Chang (7) | 0–3 | Kolding B (6) | Værktæjscenter Fyn |
| 18:00 |

| 5 August 2025 | KFUM BK Odense (5) | 0–4 | Kolding IF (2) | KFUM Parken |
| 18:15 |

| 5 August 2025 | OKS (5) | 2–3 | Middelfart (2) | OKSON-Park |
| 18:30 |

| 6 August 2025 | BV Oksbøl (7) | 4–1 | Billund IF (7) | Oksbøl Stadion |
| 18:00 |

| 6 August 2025 | B 1909 (6) | 1–0 | FC Sønderborg (6) | 3F Gillested Park |
| 18:00 |

| 6 August 2025 | Marienlyst (5) | 1–2 | Esbjerg fB (2) | Marienlyst centeret |
| 18:00 |

| 7 August 2025 | Marstal IF (6) | 3–2 | Tved BK (5) | Kortermann-IT Stadium |
| 17:00 |

| 7 August 2025 | FC Skanderborg (6) | 4–0 | Kjellerup IF (6) | Team.Blue Arena |
| 18:00 |

| 7 August 2025 | FC BiH Odense (8) | 2–7 | FC Horsens (7) | Ejby Skole |
| 19:00 |

| 12 August 2025 | Næsby (4) | 1–2 | AC Horsens (2) | ALPI Arena |
| 18:00 |

=== Middle/Northern Jutland ===
| 5 August 2025 | Skovsgaard B (6) | 2–4 | Hobro (2) | Skovgaard Stadium |
| 18:00 |

| 5 August 2025 | Brabrand (3) | 0–3 | Skive (3) | Brabrand IF anlæg |

| 5 August 2025 | Skødstrup SF (7) | 0–2 | Thisted FC (3) | Studstrup Idrætsanlæg |
| 18:00 |

| 5 August 2025 | Skibsby-Højene IF (8) | 0–3 | Aarhus Fremad (2) | Højene Hallerne |
| 18:00 |

| 5 August 2025 | ASA (5) | 1–2 | Lyseng (4) | ASA Grounds |
| 18:00 |

| 5 August 2025 | Grenaa IF (6) | 0–3 | Young Boys (5) | HSM Arena Grenaa |
| 18:00 |

| 5 August 2025 | Nørager B (7) | 1–6 | VSK Aarhus (3) | Nørager Stadium |
| 19:00 |

| 5 August 2025 | Snejbjerg SG&I (9) | 0–6 | Vejgaard BK (4) | Vestjyllands Forskiring Arena |
| 19:00 |

| 5 August 2025 | Mejrup GU (7) | 2–1 (a.e.t.) | Thorsager-Rønde IF (7) | Mejrup Kultur&Fritids Center |
| 19:00 |

| 5 August 2025 | Farsø/Ullits IK (6) | 4–3 | Nørresundby FB (5) | Sparkassen Danmark Arena |
| 19:00 |

| 6 August 2025 | Holstebro (5) | 2–4 (a.e.t.) | Odder IGF (4) | Krøyer Park |
| 18:30 |

| 6 August 2025 | Vendsyssel (3) | 1–2 (a.e.t.) | AaB (2) | Nord Energi Arena |
| 19:00 |

== Second round ==
There were 52 teams still playing in the 2nd round:

- 46 teams from the 1st round

New entries:

- 4 teams from the 2024–25 Danish Superliga (7th–10th placed)
- 2 teams from the 2024–25 Danish 1st Division (1st and 2nd placed)

Number of teams per tier still in competition
| Superliga (tier 1) | 1st Division (tier 2) | 2nd Division (tier 3) | 3rd Division (tier 4) | Danmarksserien (tier 5) | Regional-series (tier 6) | Serie 1, 2 & 3 (tier 7, 8 & 9) | Total |
|---|---|---|---|---|---|---|---|
| 6 / 6 6 / 6 | 11 / 12 | 7 / 12 | 8 / 11 | 6 / 18 | 9 / 19 | 5 / 20 | 58 / 104 |

=== East ===
| 27 August 2025 | FC Kalundborg (8) | 0–11 | OB (1) | Odense Stadium |
| 19:00 |

| 2 September 2025 | Gørslev IF (5) | 0–5 | Roskilde (3) | Gørslev Stadion |
| 17:00 |

| 2 September 2025 | Brøndby Strand (7) | 2–3 | Hillerød (2) | Langebjerg Skole |
| 17:00 |

| 2 September 2025 | LSF (5) | 1–1 (a.e.t.) (5–6 p) | Lyngby (2) | Smørum Stadion |
| 17:00 |

| 2 September 2025 | Holbæk B&I (4) | 3–0 | Ishøj (3) | Holbæk Sportsby |
| 18:30 |

| 2 September 2025 | FC Nakskov (6) | 0–4 | HIK (3) | OK+ Stadion |
| 18:30 |

| 2 September 2025 | GVI (5) | 3–3 (a.e.t.) (4–5 p) | Brønshøj (4) | GVI Nymose |
| 18:30 |

| 2 September 2025 | Sundby (4) | 3–2 | Vanløse (4) | Sundby Idrætspark |
| 19:00 |

| 3 September 2025 | Ringsted (5) | 3–1 | Skjold (5) | Ringsted Stadion |
| 17:00 |

| 3 September 2025 | Tune IF (6) | 2–4 | Fredericia (1) | Tune Stadion |
| 17:00 |

| 3 September 2025 | Raklev (6) | 0–10 | Sønderjyske (1) | Røsnæs Hallen |
| 18:00 |

| 3 September 2025 | FA 2000 (4) | 1–2 (a.e.t.) | Hvidovre (2) | Frederiksberg IP |
| 19:00 |

| 9 September 2025 | AB (3) | 1–1 (a.e.t.) (3–4 p) | B.93 (2) | Gladsaxe Stadion |
| 19:00 |

=== West ===
| 2 September 2025 | FC Skanderborg (6) | 0–6 | Vejle (1) | Team Blue Arena |
| 17:00 |

| 2 September 2025 | Oksbøl (7) | 4–0 | Bramming B (6) | Oksbøl Stadion |
| 17:00 |

| 2 September 2025 | Horsens (7) | 0–5 | VSK Aarhus (3) | Designa Arena |
| 17:00 |

| 2 September 2025 | Farsø/Ullits IK (6) | 1–2 | Kolding Boldklub (6) | Sparekassen Danmark Arena |
| 17:00 |

| 2 September 2025 | Mejrup GU (7) | 0–4 | Thisted (3) | Mejrup Kultur&Fritids Center |
| 17:00 |

| 2 September 2025 | Marstal (6) | 1–6 | AaB (2) | Kortermann IT Stadion |
| 17:00 |

| 2 September 2025 | Skive (3) | 0–2 | Kolding (2) | Skive Stadium |
| 19:00 |

| 3 September 2025 | Young Boys (5) | 1–6 | Aarhus Fremad (2) | Søholt Idrætspark |
| 17:00 |

| 3 September 2025 | Middelfart (2) | 1–2 | Silkeborg (1) | Middelfart Sparkasse Arena |
| 17:00 |

| 3 September 2025 | Odder IGF (4) | 1–1 (a.e.t.) (4–5 p) | Lyseng (4) | Spektrum Odder |
| 17:00 |

| 3 September 2025 | B 1909 (6) | 0–3 | Hobro (2) | 3F Gillested Park |
| 17:00 |

| 4 September 2025 | Horsens (2) | 0–1 | Viborg (1) | Forum Horsens Stadium |
| 18:30 |

| 10 September 2025 | Vejgaard (4) | 1–2 | Esbjerg (2) | Soffy Road |
| 17:00 |

== Third round ==
32 teams participated in the 3rd round:

- 26 teams from the 2nd round

New entries:

- 6 teams from the 2024–25 Danish Superliga (1st–6th placed)

Number of teams per tier still in competition
| Superliga (tier 1) | 1st Division (tier 2) | 2nd Division (tier 3) | 3rd Division (tier 4) | Denmark series (tier 5) | Regional-series (tier 6) | Serie 1, 2 & 3 (tier 7, 8 & 9) | Total |
|---|---|---|---|---|---|---|---|
| 6 / 6 6 / 6 | 10 / 12 | 4 / 12 | 3 / 11 | 1 / 18 | 1 / 19 | 1 / 20 | 32 / 104 |

| 16 September 2025 | HIK (3) | 1–2 | Randers (1) | Gentofte Sportspark |
| 18:30 |

| 16 September 2025 | Hvidovre (2) | 1–2 | Sønderjyske (1) | Hvidovre Stadium |
| 18:30 |

| 17 September 2025 | AaB (2) | 0–3 | Midtjylland (1) | Aalborg |
| 18:00 | | Report | Júnior Brumado 50'; Byskov 63'; Cho Gue-sung 79' | Stadium: Aalborg Stadium; Attendance: 4,700; Referee: Aydin Uslu |

| 17 September 2025 | Lyseng (4) | 4–3 (a.e.t.) | Roskilde (3) | Lyseng Idrætscenter |
| 18:30 |

| 17 September 2025 | Kolding (6) | 0–5 | Silkeborg (1) | Mosevej Sportsplads |
| 18:30 |

| 23 September 2025 | Ringsted (5) | 0–1 | Esbjerg (2) | Ringsted Stadion |
| 16:00 |

| 23 September 2025 | Brønshøj (4) | 3–1 | VSK Aarhus (3) | Tingbjerg Idrætspark |
| 19:00 |

| 23 September 2025 | Sundby (4) | 0–3 | OB (1) | Sundby Idrætspark |
| 19:00 | | | Niemiec 28'; Ganaus 75'; Hansborg 85' | Attendance: 1,715 |

| 24 September 2025 | Hillerød (2) | 1–2 | AGF (1) | Hillerød Stadium |
| 15:00 |

| 24 September 2025 | BV Oksbøl (7) | 0–6 | Viborg (1) | Oksbøl Stadion |
| 16:00 |

| 24 September 2025 | Aarhus Fremad (2) | 1–2 | Hobro (2) | Riisvangen Stadium |
| 16:00 |

| 24 September 2025 | Lyngby (2) | 0–2 | Copenhagen (1) | Lyngby Stadium |
| 17:45 |

| 24 September 2025 | Holbæk B&I (4) | 2–3 | Vejle (1) | Holbæk Sportsby |
| 19:00 |

| 24 September 2025 | Thisted (3) | 1–2 | Fredericia (1) | Sparekassen Thy Arena |
| 19:00 |

| 24 September 2025 | B.93(2) | 1–4 | Brøndby (1) | Sundby Idrætspark |
| 20:45 |

| 25 September 2025 | Kolding (2) | 0–2 | Nordsjælland (1) | Kolding Stadium |
| 19:00 |

== Fourth round ==
There will be 16 teams.

Number of teams per tier still in competition
| Superliga (tier 1) | 1st Division (tier 2) | 2nd Division (tier 3) | 3rd Division (tier 4) | Denmark series (tier 5) | Regional-series (tier 6) | Serie 1 & 2 (tier 7 & 8) | Total |
|---|---|---|---|---|---|---|---|
| 12 / 12 | 2 / 12 | 0 / 12 | 2 / 11 | 0 / 18 | 0 / 19 | 0 / 20 | 16 / 104 |

| 22 October 2025 | Brønshøj (4) | 0–3 | OB (1) | Tingbjerg Idrætspark |
| 18:00 |

| 29 October 2025 | Hobro (2) | 1–4 | Copenhagen (1) | Hobro Stadium |
| 17:45 |

| 29 October 2025 | Fredericia (1) | 2–2 (a.e.t.) (2–4 p) | Viborg (1) | Fredericia Stadium |
| 18:00 |

| 29 October 2025 | Lyseng (4) | 0–4 | Vejle (1) | Lyseng Idrætscenter |
| 18:00 |

| 29 October 2025 | Esbjerg (2) | 0–0 (a.e.t.) (4–2 p) | Randers (1) | Esbjerg Stadium |
| 19:00 |

| 29 October 2025 | AGF (1) | 2–1 | Sønderjyske (1) | Aarhus Stadium |
| 20:45 |

| 30 October 2025 | Midtjylland (1) | 4–0 | Silkeborg (1) | MCH Arena |
| 17:45 |

| 30 October 2025 | Nordsjælland (1) | 4–2 (a.e.t.) | Brøndby (1) | Right to Dream Park |
| 20:45 |

== Quarter-finals ==
The quarter-finals included eight teams from the 4th round (winners) playing two legs:

Number of teams per tier still in competition
| Superliga (tier 1) | 1st Division (tier 2) | 2nd Division (tier 3) | 3rd Division (tier 4) | Denmark series (tier 5) | Regional series (tier 6) | 1 & 2 series (tier 7 & 8) | Total |
|---|---|---|---|---|---|---|---|
| 7 / 12 | 1 / 12 | 0 / 12 | 0 / 12 | 0 / 18 | 0 / 23 | 0 / 15 | 8 / 104 |

| 3 December 2025 | Esbjerg (2) | 2–4 | Copenhagen (1) | Esbjerg Stadium |
| 18:00 |

| 13 December 2025 | Copenhagen (1) | 2–0 (6–2 agg.) | Esbjerg (2) | Parken Stadium |
| 18:00 |

| 3 December 2025 | Viborg (1) | 4–1 | Vejle (1) | Viborg Stadium |
| 20:15 |

| 13 December 2025 | Vejle (1) | 1–0 (2–4 agg.) | Viborg (1) | Vejle Stadium |
| 15:00 |

| 4 December 2025 | Midtjylland (1) | 5–1 | Nordsjælland (1) | MCH Arena |
| 19:00 |

| 14 December 2025 | Nordsjælland (1) | 2–1 (3–6 agg.) | Midtjylland (1) | Right to Dream Park |
| 18:00 |

| 11 December 2025 | OB (1) | 1–0 | AGF (1) | Odense Stadium |
| 19:00 |

| 14 December 2025 | AGF (1) | 3–1 (3–2 agg.) | OB (1) | Aarhus Stadium |
| 15:00 |

== Semi-finals ==
Four teams from the quarter-finals playing two legs. The draw for the semi-finals was held on 14 December 2024.

Number of teams per tier still in competition
| Superliga (tier 1) | 1st Division (tier 2) | 2nd Division (tier 3) | 3rd Division (tier 4) | Denmark series (tier 5) | Regional series (tier 6) | 1 & 2 series (tier 7 & 8) | Total |
|---|---|---|---|---|---|---|---|
| 4 / 12 | 0 / 12 | 0 / 12 | 0 / 12 | 0 / 18 | 0 / 23 | 0 / 15 | 4 / 104 |

| 11 February 2026 | Copenhagen | 2–1 | Viborg | Copenhagen |
| 19:00 | Clem 14'; Elyounoussi 49' | Report | Dorian Jr. 25' | Stadium: Parken Stadium; Attendance: 15,885; Referee: Mads-Kristoffer Kristoffersen |

| 7 March 2026 | Viborg | 1–2 (2–4 agg.) | Copenhagen | Viborg |
| 17:00 | Jørgensen 38' | | Moukoko 29', 46' | Stadium: Viborg Stadium; Attendance: 8,430; Referee: Aydin Uslu |

| 12 February 2026 | AGF | 0–1 | Midtjylland | Risskov |
| 19:00 | | Report | Lee Han-beom 62' | Stadium: Vejlby Stadium; Attendance: 12,000; Referee: Jakob Karlsen |

| 8 March 2026 | Midtjylland | 1–1 (2–1 agg.) | AGF | Herning |
| 18:00 | Júnior Brumado 68' | | Tobias Bech 58' | Stadium: MCH Arena; Attendance: 11,265; Referee: Morten Krogh |

== Final ==
The winner qualified for the second qualifying round of 2026–27 Europa League.

| 14 May 2026 | Copenhagen | 0−1 | Midtjylland | Copenhagen |
| 15:00 | | Report | Lee Han-beom 82' | Stadium: Parken Stadium; Attendance: 35,485; Referee: Lasse Læbel Graagaard |
