= 2022–23 Danish 3rd Division =

Danish 3rd Division
- Season: 2022–23
- Dates: Regular season: 6 August 2022 – 10 April 2023; Play-offs: 15 April 2023 – 17 June 2023
- Champions: Middelfart (1st title)
- Promoted: Middelfart; FA 2000
- Relegated: AB Tårnby; Dalum
- Matches: 191
- Goals: 598 (3.13 per match)
- Top goalscorer: Daniel Stückler (22 goals)
- Biggest home win: Ishøj 10–0 SfB-Oure FA (10 September 2022)
- Biggest away win: Dalum 1–8 Ishøj (8 October 2022)
- Highest scoring: Ishøj 10–0 SfB-Oure FA (10 September 2022)
- Highest attendance: 1,314; Holstebro 1–1 Young Boys FD
- Lowest attendance: 0 (various)
- Average attendance: 132

The 2022–23 Danish 3rd Division was the second season of the Danish 3rd Division since its establishment in 2021. The season started on 6 August 2022 with a group of twelve teams. After 22 rounds the group was split in a promotion group and a relegation group. The top two teams of the promotion group were promoted to the 2023–24 Danish 2nd Division.

== Participants ==
AB Tårnby, Ishøj IF, SfB-Oure FA, and Holstebro were promoted from the 2021–22 Denmark Series.

=== Stadia and locations ===
Locations of the 2022–23 Danish 3rd Division teams. Copenhagen teams:FA 2000 and Vanløse

Club	Location	Stadium	Turf	Capacity	2021–22 position
AB Tårnby	Tårnby	Tårnby Stadium	Natural	10,000	DS2, 1st
Dalum IF	Odense	Dalum Stadion	Natural	4,000	5th
FA 2000	Frederiksberg	Frederiksberg Idrætspark	Artificial	5,000	2D, 11th
Holstebro	Holstebro	Holstebro Idrætspark	Natural	8,000	DS4, 1st
IF Lyseng	Aarhus	Lyseng Idrætscenter	Artificial	2,000	6th
Ishøj IF	Ishøj	Ishøj Idrætscenter	Natural	1,500	DS1, 1st
Middelfart G&BK	Middelfart	Middelfart Stadion	Natural	4,100	2D, 12th
Næsby BK	Odense	ALPI Arena Næsby	Natural	2,500	4th
SfB-Oure FA	Svendborg	Høje Bøge Stadium	Natural	7,000	DS3, 1st
Vanløse IF	Copenhagen	Vanløse Idrætspark	Natural	10,000	8th
VSK Aarhus	Aarhus	Vejlby Stadium	Natural	5,000	3rd
Young Boys FD	Silkeborg	Søholt Idrætsanlæg	Natural	1,500	7th

== League table ==
Pos	Team	Pld	W	D	L	GF	GA	GD	Pts	Promotion or Relegation
1	Middelfart G&BK	22	17	3	2	48	15	+33	54	Qualification to Promotion Group
2	FA 2000	22	13	3	6	42	23	+19	42	Qualification to Promotion Group
3	Vanløse IF	22	11	5	6	37	30	+7	38	Qualification to Promotion Group
4	Ishøj IF	22	11	4	7	56	32	+24	37	Qualification to Promotion Group
5	VSK Aarhus	22	10	6	6	45	24	+21	36	Qualification to Promotion Group
6	Næsby BK	22	10	6	6	40	22	+18	36	Qualification to Promotion Group
7	Young Boys FD	22	10	5	7	37	23	+14	35	Qualification to Relegation Group
8	SfB-Oure FA	22	7	6	9	31	48	−17	27	Qualification to Relegation Group
9	IF Lyseng	22	7	5	10	29	42	−13	26	Qualification to Relegation Group
10	Holstebro	22	6	5	11	25	31	−6	23	Qualification to Relegation Group
11	AB Tårnby	22	5	2	15	27	50	−23	17	Qualification to Relegation Group
12	Dalum IF	22	0	0	22	6	81	−75	0	Qualification to Relegation Group

Updated to match(es) played on 20 November 2022. Source: Danish FA
Rules for classification: 1) points; 2) goal difference; 3) number of goals scored

== Promotion Group ==
The top 6 teams will compete for 2 spots in the 2023–24 Danish 2nd Division. Points and goals carried over in full from the regular season.

Pos	Team	Pld	W	D	L	GF	GA	GD	Pts	Qualification or relegation	MID	FA2	VSK	ISH	VAN	NSB
1	Middelfart G&BK (P)	32	23	6	3	60	20	+40	75	Promotion to Danish 2nd Division	—	1–0	0–1	0–0	2–0	0–0
2	FA 2000 (P)	32	17	7	8	56	32	+24	58	Promotion to Danish 2nd Division	1–1	—	1–0	3–1	2–0	0–0
3	VSK Aarhus	32	15	8	9	57	34	+23	53		1–2	1–1	—	1–3	0–0	2–1
4	Ishøj IF	32	14	6	12	67	47	+20	48		0–2	0–2	0–2	—	2–0	3–1
5	Vanløse IF	32	13	8	11	48	45	+3	47		2–3	1–1	1–2	4–2	—	1–1
6	Næsby BK	32	11	10	11	49	37	+12	43		0–1	4–3	1–1	1–1	0–2	—

Updated to match(es) played on 17 June 2023. Source: Danish Football Association (in Danish), Soccerway
Legend: Blue = home team win; Yellow = draw; Red = away team win.
Rules for classification: 1) Points; 2) Goal difference; 3) Goals scored; 4) Away goals scored; 5) Play-off (played on neutral ground if determining teams for different rounds); 6) Draw.
(P) Promoted

== Relegation Group ==
The bottom 6 teams will compete to avoid the initial 3 relegations spots to the 2023–24 Denmark Series. Due to Jammerbugt FC forced relegation only 2 teams are set to be relegated in the 2022–23 season. Points and goals carried over in full from the regular season.

Pos	Team	Pld	W	D	L	GF	GA	GD	Pts	Qualification or relegation	YOU	HOL	LYS	SFB	ABT	DAL
1	Young Boys FD	32	17	8	7	60	29	+31	59		—	1–1	3–1	3–0	3–1	6–0
2	Holstebro	32	11	9	12	46	42	+4	42		1–1	—	2–2	3–1	4–2	2–0
3	IF Lyseng	32	11	8	13	54	55	−1	41		0–1	0–2	—	2–2	1–1	4–0
4	SfB-Oure FA	32	10	8	14	49	61	−12	38		2–5	0–0	1–6	—	4–1	2–1
5	AB Tårnby (Q)	32	8	4	20	42	74	−32	28	Relegation to Denmark Series	0–0	3–2	1–5	3–1	—	2–1
6	Dalum IF (Q)	32	1	0	31	12	110	−98	3	Relegation to Denmark Series	0–2	0–3	0–3	1–5	3–0	—

Updated to match(es) played on 17 June 2023. Source: Danish Football Association (in Danish), Soccerway
Legend: Blue = home team win; Yellow = draw; Red = away team win.
Rules for classification: 1) Points; 2) Goal difference; 3) Goals scored; 4) Away goals scored; 5) Play-off (played on neutral ground if determining teams for different rounds); 6) Draw.
(Q) Qualified for the phase indicated
