= 2023–24 Danish 3rd Division =

Danish football 3rd division 2023–24 season

Danish 3rd Division
- Season: 2023–24
- Champions: BK Frem
- Promoted: BK Frem; Ishøj IF
- Relegated: Vejgaard BK; SfB-Oure FA; Vanløse IF

The 2023–24 Danish 3rd Division is the 3rd season of the Danish 3rd Division since its establishment in 2021 as the new tier 4 in the Danish football league system. The season will start with a group of twelve teams. After 22 rounds the group will be split in a promotion group and a relegation group. The top two teams of the promotion group will be promoted to the 2024–25 Danish 2nd Division. The bottom three teams of the relegation group will be relegated to the 2024–25 Denmark series.

== Participants ==
Frem finished the 2022–23 Danish 2nd Division in 11th place and were relegated to 3rd division. They replaced Middelfart G&BK and FA 2000 who were promoted to the 2023–24 Danish 2nd Division.

Holbæk B&I, Vejgaard BK and Avarta were promoted from the 2022–23 Denmark Series. They replaced AB Tårnby and Dalum IF who were relegated to 2023–24 Denmark Series.

The unequal distribution of promoted and relegated teams was caused by the bankruptcy of Jammerbugt FC in August 2022, which led to the club being expelled from the 2022–23 Danish 2nd Division and relegated to tier 6.

=== Stadia and locations ===
Locations of the 2023–24 Danish 3rd Division Copenhagen teams: Avarta, BK Frem and Vanløse

Club	Location	Stadium	Turf	Capacity	2022–23 position
Avarta	Rødovre	Tømrermester Jim Jensens Park	Natural	6,000	DS 3rd
BK Frem	Valby	Valby Idrætspark	Natural	12,000	2D 11th
Holbæk B&I	Holbæk	Holbæk Sportsby	Natural	4,000	DS 1st
Holstebro	Holstebro	Holstebro Idrætspark	Natural	8,000	9th
IF Lyseng	Aarhus	Lyseng Idrætscenter	Artificial	2,000	8th
Ishøj IF	Ishøj	Ishøj Idrætscenter	Natural	1,500	5th
Næsby BK	Odense	ALPI Arena Næsby	Natural	2,500	6th
SfB-Oure FA	Svendborg	Høje Bøge Stadium	Natural	7,000	10th
Vanløse IF	Vanløse	Vanløse Idrætspark	Natural	10,000	4th
Vejgaard BK	Aalborg	Soffy Road	Natural	2,000	DS 2nd
VSK Aarhus	Aarhus	Vejlby Stadium	Natural	5,000	3th
Young Boys FD	Silkeborg	Søholt Idrætsanlæg	Natural	1,500	7th

== League table ==
Pos	Team	Pld	W	D	L	GF	GA	GD	Pts	Promotion or Relegation
1	BK Frem	22	13	4	5	35	21	+14	43	Qualification to Promotion Group
2	VSK Aarhus	22	11	4	7	39	24	+15	37	Qualification to Promotion Group
3	Ishøj IF	22	9	7	6	40	30	+10	34	Qualification to Promotion Group
4	BK Avarta	22	9	4	9	21	28	−7	31	Qualification to Promotion Group
5	Holbæk B&I	22	8	6	8	23	23	0	30	Qualification to Promotion Group
6	Næsby BK	22	7	8	7	32	32	0	29	Qualification to Promotion Group
7	SfB-Oure FA	22	8	5	9	31	37	−6	29	Qualification to Relegation Group
8	IF Lyseng	22	7	7	8	33	35	−2	28	Qualification to Relegation Group
9	Young Boys FD	22	7	6	9	32	38	−6	27	Qualification to Relegation Group
10	Vejgaard BK	22	7	5	10	28	34	−6	26	Qualification to Relegation Group
11	Holstebro BK	22	7	4	11	32	33	−1	25	Qualification to Relegation Group
12	Vanløse IF	22	5	8	9	21	32	−11	23	Qualification to Relegation Group

Updated to match(es) played on 1 April 2024. Source: Danish FA
Rules for classification: 1) points; 2) goal difference; 3) number of goals scored

== Promotion Group ==
The top 6 teams will compete for 2 spots in the 2024–25 Danish 2nd Division. Points and goals carried over in full from the regular season.

Pos	Team	Pld	W	D	L	GF	GA	GD	Pts	
1	BK Frem (C, P)	32	20	6	6	58	34	+24	66	Promotion to 2nd Division
2	Ishøj IF (P)	32	14	10	8	55	41	+14	52	Promotion to 2nd Division
3	Næsby BK	32	13	9	10	58	51	+7	48	
4	VSK Aarhus	32	14	6	12	51	41	+10	48	
5	Holbæk B&I	32	9	9	14	34	41	−7	36	
6	BK Avarta	32	10	7	15	29	45	−16	37	

Updated to match(es) played on 9 June 2024. Source: Danish FA
Rules for classification: 1) points; 2) goal difference; 3) number of goals scored
(C) Champions; (P) Promoted

== Relegation Group ==
The bottom 6 teams will compete to avoid the initial 3 relegations spots to the 2024–25 Denmark Series. Points and goals carried over in full from the regular season.

Pos	Team	Pld	W	D	L	GF	GA	GD	Pts	Promotion or Relegation
1	Holstebro BK	32	13	5	14	51	45	+6	44	
2	IF Lyseng	32	11	10	11	61	58	+3	43	
3	Young Boys FD	32	11	9	12	47	49	−2	42	
4	Vejgaard BK (R)	32	11	8	13	45	50	−5	41	Relegation to Denmark Series
5	SfB-Oure FA (R)	32	9	9	14	38	56	−18	36	Relegation to Denmark Series
6	Vanløse IF (R)	32	8	10	14	33	49	−16	34	Relegation to Denmark Series

Updated to match(es) played on 9 June 2024. Source: Danish FA
Rules for classification: 1) points; 2) goal difference; 3) number of goals scored
(R) Relegated
