= 2024–25 Danish 3rd Division =

Danish 3rd Division
- Season: 2024–25
- All statistics correct as of 23 July 2024.

The 2024–25 Danish 3rd Division is the fourth season of the Danish 3rd Division since its establishment in 2021 as the new fourth tier in the Danish football league system. The season started with a group of twelve teams. After 22 rounds, the group were split into a promotion group and a relegation group. The top two teams of the promotion group were promoted to the 2025–26 Danish 2nd Division. The bottom three of the relegation group were relegated to the 2025–26 Denmark Series.

== Participants ==
FA 2000 finished the 2023–24 Danish 2nd Division in 11th place and were relegated to 3rd division. Brabrand IF finished in 12th place and were relegated to 3rd Division. They replaced Frem and Ishøj IF who were promoted to the 2024–25 Danish 2nd Division.

Sundby BK, Odder and Brønshøj BK were promoted from the 2023–24 Denmark Series. They replaced Vanløse, SfB-Oure FA and Vejgaard who were relegated to 2024–25 Denmark Series.

== Stadia and locations ==
Locations of the 2023–24 Danish 3rd Division
Copenhagen teams: Avarta, Brønshøj, Sundby BK and FA 2000
Aarhus teams: Lyseng, Brabrand and VSK Aarhus

Club	Location	Stadium	Turf	Capacity	2023–24 position
Avarta	Rødovre	Tømrermester Jim Jensens Park	Natural	6,000	5th
Brabrand	Brabrand	Brabrand Stadion	Natural	1,000	12th in 2D
Brønshøj	Brønshøj	Tingbjerg Idrætspark	Natural	4,000	PW in DS
FA 2000	Frederiksberg	Frederiksberg Idrætspark	Artificial	5,000	11th in 2D
Holbæk B&I	Holbæk	Holbæk Sportsby	Natural	4,000	6th
Holstebro	Holstebro	Holstebro Idrætspark	Natural	8,000	7th
IF Lyseng	Aarhus	Lyseng Idrætscenter	Artificial	2,000	8th
Næsby BK	Odense	ALPI Arena Næsby	Natural	2,500	4th
Odder	Odder	Spektrum Park	Natural	1,000	1st in DS(W)
Sundby	Amager Øst	Sundby Idrætspark	Artificial	7,200	1st in DS(E)
VSK Aarhus	Aarhus	Vejlby Stadium	Natural	5,000	3rd
Young Boys FD	Silkeborg	Søholt Idrætsanlæg	Natural	1,500	9th

== League table ==
Pos	Team	Pld	W	D	L	GF	GA	GD	Pts	Promotion or Relegation
1	Brabrand	22	12	5	5	35	23	+12	41	Qualification to Promotion Group
2	VSK Aarhus	22	12	4	6	38	28	+10	40	Qualification to Promotion Group
3	Brønshøj BK	22	10	7	5	27	17	+10	37	Qualification to Promotion Group
4	Odder	22	9	9	4	38	34	+4	36	Qualification to Promotion Group
5	Holbæk B&I	22	10	4	8	29	22	+7	34	Qualification to Promotion Group
6	Næsby	22	9	5	8	37	27	+10	32	Qualification to Promotion Group
7	FA 2000	22	7	7	8	26	24	+2	28	Qualification to Relegation Group
8	Avarta	22	8	2	12	18	32	−14	26	Qualification to Relegation Group
9	Sundby BK	22	6	7	9	21	30	−9	25	Qualification to Relegation Group
10	Young Boys	22	5	7	10	23	32	−9	22	Qualification to Relegation Group
11	IF Lyseng	22	5	7	10	23	33	−10	22	Qualification to Relegation Group
12	Holstebro	22	5	4	13	26	39	−13	19	Qualification to Relegation Group

Rules for classification: 1) points; 2) goal difference; 3) number of goals scored

== Promotion Group ==
The top 6 teams will compete for 2 spots in the 2025–26 Danish 2nd Division. Points and goals carried over in full from the regular season.

Pos	Team	Pld	W	D	L	GF	GA	GD	Pts	Qualification or relegation	BRA	VSK	HBI	NBK	BBK	ODD
1	Brabrand (C, P)	32	17	8	7	49	36	+13	59	Promotion to Danish 2nd Division		1–1	1–0	3–2	0–0	1–1
2	VSK Aarhus (P)	32	15	9	8	54	41	+13	54	Promotion to Danish 2nd Division	0–1		2–5	4–0	2–0	1–1
3	Holbæk B&I	32	15	8	9	54	36	+18	53		4–0	2–2		2–2	2–0	2–0
4	Næsby	33	11	8	14	61	50	+11	41		1–2	2–3	3–3		2–1	6–1
5	Brønshøj BK	32	10	11	11	33	34	−1	41		0–2	0–0	2–2	2–4		0–2
6	Odder	32	11	14	7	53	54	−1	47		4–3	1–1	2–3	2–2	1–1	

Legend: Blue = home team win; Yellow = draw; Red = away team win.
Rules for classification: 1) Points; 2) Goal difference; 3) Goals scored; 4) Away goals scored; 5) Play-off (played on neutral ground if determining teams for different rounds); 6) Draw.
(C) Champions; (P) Promoted

== Relegation Group ==
The bottom 6 teams will compete to avoid the 3 relegations to the 2025–26 Denmark Series. Points and goals carried over in full from the regular season.

Pos	Team	Pld	W	D	L	GF	GA	GD	Pts	Qualification or relegation	FA2	IFL	SBK	HBK	AVA	YBF
1	FA 2000	32	12	10	10	42	32	+10	46		—	3–1	1–1	0–2	1–1	0–0
2	IF Lyseng	32	10	10	12	44	48	−4	40		2–0	—	2–2	4–1	2–1	3–1
3	Sundby BK	32	10	10	12	35	47	−12	40		0–1	2–1	—	0–3	1–0	3–2
4	Holstebro (R)	32	11	5	16	52	60	−8	38	Relegation to Denmark Series	0–6	3–3	4–1	—	6–3	1–0
5	Avarta (R)	32	10	5	17	30	51	−21	35	Relegation to Denmark Series	0–1	1–1	1–1	2–5	—	2–1
6	Young Boys (R)	32	6	8	18	33	51	−18	26	Relegation to Denmark Series	1–3	1–2	2–3	2–1	0–1	—

Legend: Blue = home team win; Yellow = draw; Red = away team win.
Rules for classification: 1) Points; 2) Goal difference; 3) Goals scored; 4) Away goals scored; 5) Play-off (played on neutral ground if determining teams for different rounds); 6) Draw.
(R) Relegated
