= List of football stadiums in Denmark =

The following is a list of football stadiums in Denmark, ranked in order of capacity, with the minimum capacity being 1,000.

== Current stadiums ==
#	Image	Stadium	Capacity	City	Home team	UEFA rank
1		Parken Stadium	38,065	Østerbro, Copenhagen	F.C. Copenhagen	4/4 stars
2		Brøndby Stadium	29,000	Brøndbyvester	Brøndby IF	4/4 stars
3		Ceres Park under rebuilding until March 2027	24,000	Aarhus	Aarhus GF	
4		Blue Water Arena	17,442	Esbjerg	Esbjerg fB	
5		Nature Energy Park	15,790	Odense	Odense BK & OB Q	
6		Gentofte Sportspark	15,000	Gentofte	HIK	
7		Aalborg Portland Park	13,310	Aalborg	AaB	
8		Gladsaxe Stadium	13,300	Søborg, Gladsaxe	Akademisk Boldklub	
9		MCH Arena	12,152	Herning	FC Midtjylland & FC Midtjylland (women)	
10		Hvidovre Stadion	12,000	Hvidovre	Hvidovre IF	
11		Vejle Stadium	11,060	Vejle	Vejle Boldklub	
12		Nordstern Arena Horsens	10,400	Horsens	AC Horsens	
13		Cepheus Park Randers	10,300	Randers	Randers FC	
14		Right to Dream Park	10,300	Farum	FC Nordsjælland & FC Nordsjælland (women)	
15		Sydbank Park	10,107	Haderslev	SønderjyskE	
16		Energi Viborg Arena	10,000	Viborg	Viborg FF	
17		Lyngby Stadion	10,000	Kongens Lyngby	Lyngby BK	
18		JYSK Park	10,000	Silkeborg	Silkeborg IF	
19		MTM service Park	10,000	Næstved	Næstved BK & Næstved HG	
20		Kolding Stadion	10,000	Kolding	Kolding IF & Kolding IF (women)	
21		SPAR Nord Arena	10,000	Skive	Skive IK	
22		DS Arena	10,000	Hobro	Hobro IK	
23		Nykøbing Falster Idrætspark	10,000	Nykøbing Falster	Nykøbing FC	
24		Vanløse Idrætspark	10,000	Vanløse	Vanløse IF & FCK (women)	
25		Monjasa Park	10,000	Fredericia	FC Fredericia	
26		Holstebro Idrætspark	8,000	Holstebro	Holstebro Boldklub	
27		Køge Stadium	8,000	Køge	HB Køge & HB Køge (women)	
28		Nord Energi Arena	7,500	Hjørring	Vendsyssel FF & Fortuna Hjørring	
29		Sundby Idrætspark	7,200	Sundby, Amager	Fremad Amager & Sundby BK	
30		Valby Idrætspark	7,000	Valby, Copenhagen	Boldklubben Frem & Østrebro IF (women)	
31		Høje Bøge Stadium	7,000	Svendborg	SfB-Oure FA	
32		Roskilde Idrætspark	6,000	Roskilde	FC Roskilde	
33		Østerbro Stadion	6,000	Østerbro, Copenhagen	B93 & BK Skjold & B93 (women)	
34		Espelundens Idrætsanlæg	6,000	Rødovre	Avarta	
35		Hillerød Stadion	5,000	Hillerød	Hillerød Fodbold	
36		Riisvangen Stadium	5,000	Aarhus	Aarhus Fremad	
37		Frederiksberg Idrætspark	5,000	Fredriksberg	FA2000	
38		Vejlby Stadium	5,000	Aarhus	VSK Aarhus & AGF Fodbold (women)	
39		Hørsholm Idrætspark	5,000	Hørsholm	Hørsholm-Usserød Idrætsklub	
40		Helsingør Stadium	4,500	Helsingør	FC Helsingør	
41		Middelfart Stadium	4,100	Middelfart	Middelfart Boldklub	
42		Tingbjerg Idrætspark	4,000	Brønshøj	Brønshøj BK	
43		Vestjysk Bank Stadion	4,000	Varde	Esbjerg fB (women)	
44		Ballerup Idrætspark	4,000	Ballerup	BSF	
45		Sparekassen Thy Arena	3,000	Thisted	Thisted FC & FC Thy-Thisted Q	
46		Holbæk Sportsby	3,000	Holbæk	Holbæk B&I	
47		Næsby Stadium	2,500	Odense	Næsby BK	
48		Lyseng Idrætscenter	2,000	Aarhus	IF Lyseng	
49		Soffy Road	2,000	Aalborg	Vejgaard BK	
50		1964 Park	2,000	Brøndbyvester	Brøndby IF (women)	
51		Ishøj Idrætscenter	1,500	Ishøj	Ishøj IF	
52		Søholt Idrætsanlæg	1,500	Silkeborg	Young Boys FD & Silkeborg Q	
53		Brabrand Stadion	1,000	Aarhus	Brabrand IF & Brabrand IF (women)	
54		Spektrum Park	1,000	Odder	Odder IGF	
55		Robotize Park	1,000	Aarhus	ASA fodbold & ASA fodbold (women)	

== Planned future stadiums and expansions ==
- New Helsingør Stadium
- Sydbank Park expansion
- Kongelunden Ceres Park
- Nature Energy Park

== See also ==
- List of stadiums in the Nordic countries by capacity
- List of European stadiums by capacity
- List of association football stadiums by capacity
- List of association football stadiums by country
- List of sports venues by capacity
- Lists of stadiums
- Football in Denmark
