= 2023–24 Danish 2nd Division =

33rd season of Danish 2nd Division

Danish 2nd Division
- Season: 2023–24
- Champions: Esbjerg fB
- Promoted: Esbjerg fB; FC Roskilde
- Relegated: FA 2000; Brabrand IF
- Top goalscorer: Elias Sørensen (24 goals)
- All statistics correct as of 23 July 2024.

The 2023–24 Danish 2nd Division was the 33rd season of the Danish 2nd Division since its establishment in 1991. The season started on 4 August 2023 with a group of twelve teams. After 22 rounds the group was split in a promotion group and a relegation group. The top two teams of the promotion group were promoted to the 2024–25 Danish 1st Division.

== Participants ==
Fremad Amager and Nykøbing FC finished the 2022–23 season of the Danish 1st Division in 11th and 12th place, respectively, and were relegated to the 2nd Division. They replaced Kolding IF and B.93, who were promoted to the 2023–24 Danish 1st Division.

Frem and Jammerbugt FC finished the 2022–23 season of the Danish 2nd Division in 11th and 12th place, respectively, and as Frem relegated to the 3rd Division, Jammerbugt went down several divisions to the Jutland Series after filing for bankruptcy. They were replaced by Middelfart Boldklub and FA 2000, who were promoted from 2022–23 Danish 3rd Division season.

=== Stadia and locations ===
Locations of the 2022–23 Danish 2nd Division teams. Copenhagen teams: Akademisk Boldklub, FA 2000 and HIK

Club	Location	Stadium	Turf	Capacity	2022–23 position
Aarhus Fremad	Aarhus	Riisvangen Stadium	Natural	5,000	3rd
Akademisk Boldklub	Gladsaxe	Gladsaxe Stadium	Natural	13,800	5th
Brabrand IF	Brabrand	Brabrand Stadion	Natural	1,000	8th
Esbjerg fB	Esbjerg	Blue Water Arena	Natural	18,000	4th
FA 2000	Frederiksberg	Frederiksberg Idrætspark	Artificial	5,000	3D, 2nd
Fremad Amager	Copenhagen	Sundby Idrætspark	Artificial	7,200	1D, 11th
HIK	Hellerup	Gentofte Sportspark	Natural	15,000	9th
Middelfart G&BK	Middelfart	Middelfart Stadion	Natural	4,100	3D, 1st
Nykøbing FC	Nykøbing Falster	Lollands Bank Park	Natural	10,000	1D, 12th
FC Roskilde	Roskilde	Roskilde Idrætspark	Natural	6,000	7th
Skive IK	Skive	SPAR Nord Arena	Natural	10,000	10th
Thisted FC	Thisted	Sparekassen Thy Arena	Natural	3,000	6th

== League table ==
Pos	Team	Pld	W	D	L	GF	GA	GD	Pts	Promotion or Relegation
1	Esbjerg fB	22	19	2	1	69	24	+45	59	Qualification to Promotion Group
2	FC Roskilde	22	13	5	4	40	27	+13	44	Qualification to Promotion Group
3	Aarhus Fremad	22	11	8	3	42	24	+18	41	Qualification to Promotion Group
4	Middelfart G&BK	22	12	5	5	34	19	+15	41	Qualification to Promotion Group
5	Nykøbing FC	22	9	6	7	31	34	−3	33	Qualification to Promotion Group
6	Akademisk Boldklub	22	5	9	8	26	34	−8	24	Qualification to Promotion Group
7	Fremad Amager	22	6	5	11	26	38	−12	23	Qualification to Relegation Group
8	Skive IK	22	5	8	9	20	30	−10	23	Qualification to Relegation Group
9	HIK	22	6	3	13	38	53	−15	21	Qualification to Relegation Group
10	Brabrand IF	22	3	9	10	22	32	−10	18	Qualification to Relegation Group
11	FA 2000	22	4	5	13	21	36	−15	17	Qualification to Relegation Group
12	Thisted FC	22	4	5	13	24	44	−20	17	Qualification to Relegation Group

Updated to match(es) played on 7 April 2024. Source: Danish FA
Rules for classification: 1) points; 2) goal difference; 3) number of goals scored

== Promotion Group ==
The top 6 teams will compete for 2 spots in the 2024–25 Danish 1st Division. Points and goals carried over in full from the regular season.

Pos	Team	Pld	W	D	L	GF	GA	GD	Pts	Qualification or relegation	ESB	ROS	AAF	MID	ABG	NYK
1	Esbjerg fB (C, P)	32	24	3	5	92	37	+55	75	Promotion to 1st Division	—	3–2	0–1	5–2	6–0	3–0
2	FC Roskilde (P)	32	17	9	6	66	42	+24	60	Promotion to 1st Division	2–2	—	6–2	0–0	1–1	5–1
3	Aarhus Fremad	32	17	8	7	63	41	+22	59		2–0	1–2	—	0–3	1–0	5–0
4	Middelfart G&BK	32	15	7	10	45	32	+13	52		0–2	2–0	0–2	—	0–1	2–0
5	Akademisk Boldklub	32	9	13	10	41	51	−10	40		2–1	3–3	5–3	1–1	—	1–1
6	Nykøbing FC	32	11	7	14	38	62	−24	40		2–1	0–5	1–4	2–1	0–1	—

Updated to match(es) played on 15 June 2024. Source: Danish Football Association (in Danish), Soccerway
Rules for classification: 1) Points; 2) Goal difference; 3) Goals scored; 4) Away goals scored; 5) Play-off (played on neutral ground if determining teams for different rounds); 6) Draw. ]
(C) Champions; (P) Promoted

== Relegation Group ==
The bottom 6 teams will compete to avoid the 2 relegations spots to the 2024–25 Danish 3rd Division. Points and goals carried over in full from the regular season.

Pos	Team	Pld	W	D	L	GF	GA	GD	Pts	Qualification	AMA	SKI	THI	HIK	FA2	BRA
1	Fremad Amager	32	12	5	15	42	46	−4	41		—	2–1	0–1	3–0	2–1	2–1
2	Skive IK	32	10	8	14	38	45	−7	38		2–1	—	1–2	4–0	3–2	2–1
3	Thisted FC	32	9	7	16	36	55	−19	34		1–2	1–0	—	1–0	2–2	1–0
4	HIK	32	10	4	18	44	65	−21	34		1–0	1–2	1–0	—	1–1	0–1
5	FA 2000 (R)	32	8	8	16	38	51	−13	32	Relegation to 3rd Division	2–1	3–2	4–2	0–1	—	0–0
6	Brabrand IF (R)	32	5	11	16	29	45	−16	26	Relegation to 3rd Division	0–3	2–1	1–1	0–1	1–2	—

Updated to match(es) played on 8 June 2024. Source: Danish Football Association (in Danish), Soccerway
Rules for classification: 1) Points; 2) Goal difference; 3) Goals scored; 4) Away goals scored; 5) Play-off (played on neutral ground if determining teams for different rounds); 6) Draw. ]
(R) Relegated
