= 2021–22 Danish 2nd Division =

Danish 2nd Division
- Season: 2021–22

The 2021–22 Danish 2nd Division started with a group of twelve teams. After 22 rounds the group was split in a promotion group and a relegation group. The top two teams of the promotion group was promoted to the 2022–23 Danish 1st Division.

== Participants ==
Kolding IF and Skive IK finished the 2020–21 season of the Danish 1st Division in 11th and 12th place, respectively, and were relegated to the 2nd Division. They replaced Nykøbing FC and Jammerbugt FC, who were promoted to the 2021–22 Danish 1st Division.

=== Stadia and locations ===
Locations of the 2021–22 Danish 2nd Division teams. Copenhagen teams: Akademisk Boldklub, B.93, FA 2000, and HIK

Club	Location	Stadium	Turf	Capacity	2020–21 position
Aarhus Fremad	Aarhus	Riisvangen Stadium	Natural	5,000	3rd in Group 1
Akademisk Boldklub	Gladsaxe	Gladsaxe Stadium	Natural	13,800	3rd in Group 2
B.93	Copenhagen	Østerbro Stadium	Natural	7,000	2nd in Group 1
Brabrand IF	Brabrand	Brabrand Stadion	Natural	1,000	6th in Group 1
FA 2000	Frederiksberg	Frederiksberg Idrætspark	Artificial	5,000	6th in Group 2
HIK	Hellerup	Gentofte Sportspark	Natural	15,000	2nd in Group 2
Hillerød Fodbold	Hillerød	Hillerød Stadion	Artificial	5,000	5th in Group 2
Kolding IF	Kolding	Autocentralen Park	Natural	10,000	1D, 11th
Middelfart G&BK	Middelfart	Middelfart Stadion	Natural	4,100	4th in Group 1
Næstved BK	Næstved	Tintshop Park	Natural	7,500	4th in Group 2
Skive IK	Skive	SPAR Nord Arena	Natural	10,000	1D, 12th
Thisted FC	Thisted	Sparekassen Thy Arena	Natural	3,000	5th in Group 1

== League table ==
Pos	Team	Pld	W	D	L	GF	GA	GD	Pts	Promotion or Relegation
1	Næstved BK	22	14	5	3	39	27	+12	47	Qualification to Promotion Group
2	Hillerød Fodbold	22	12	7	3	43	20	+23	43	Qualification to Promotion Group
3	B.93	22	10	5	7	36	31	+5	35	Qualification to Promotion Group
4	Thisted FC	22	10	5	7	30	29	+1	35	Qualification to Promotion Group
5	AB Gladsaxe	22	6	10	6	29	24	+5	28	Qualification to Promotion Group
6	HIK	22	7	7	8	31	34	−3	28	Qualification to Promotion Group
7	Aarhus Fremad	22	7	6	9	33	28	+5	27	Qualification to Relegation Group
8	Skive IK	22	7	5	10	23	27	−4	26	Qualification to Relegation Group
9	Brabrand IF	22	6	7	9	22	36	−14	25	Qualification to Relegation Group
10	Kolding IF	22	5	9	8	19	19	0	24	Qualification to Relegation Group
11	FA 2000	22	4	9	9	21	31	−10	21	Qualification to Relegation Group
12	Middelfart G&BK	22	3	7	12	20	40	−20	16	Qualification to Relegation Group

Updated to match(es) played on 9 April 2022. Source: Danish FA
Rules for classification: 1) points; 2) goal difference; 3) number of goals scored

== Promotion Group ==
The top 6 teams will compete for 2 spots in the 2022–23 Danish 1st Division. Points and goals carried over in full from the regular season.

Pos	Team	Pld	W	D	L	GF	GA	GD	Pts	Qualification or relegation	NST	HIL	THI	B93	ABG	HIK
1	Næstved BK (P)	32	22	7	3	60	33	+27	73	Promotion to 1st Division	—	3–0	1–1	3–2	1–0	2–2
2	Hillerød Fodbold (P)	32	16	8	8	53	38	+15	56	Promotion to 1st Division	0–3	—	0–2	3–2	1–0	1–3
3	Thisted FC	32	16	6	10	44	41	+3	54		0–3	1–3	—	2–1	1–0	3–1
4	B.93	32	11	9	12	53	49	+4	42		0–2	0–0	0–1	—	1–1	3–3
5	AB Gladsaxe	32	9	11	12	42	38	+4	38		0–1	3–0	3–1	1–6	—	1–2
6	HIK	32	9	10	13	46	56	−10	37		1–2	1–2	0–2	2–2	0–4	—

Updated to match(es) played on 11 June 2022. Source: Danish Football Association (in Danish), Soccerway
Legend: Blue = home team win; Yellow = draw; Red = away team win.
Rules for classification: 1) Points; 2) Goal difference; 3) Goals scored; 4) Away goals scored; 5) Play-off (played on neutral ground if determining teams for different rounds); 6) Draw. ]
(P) Promoted

== Relegation Group ==
The bottom 6 teams will compete to avoid the 2 relegations spots to the 2022–23 Danish 3rd Division. Points and goals carried over in full from the regular season.

Pos	Team	Pld	W	D	L	GF	GA	GD	Pts	Qualification or relegation	AAF	KOL	SKI	BRA	MID	FA2
1	Aarhus Fremad	32	13	9	10	54	39	+15	48		—	1–5	1–1	1–0	3–0	3–0
2	Kolding IF	32	11	11	10	41	30	+11	44		2–2	—	1–0	0–0	3–0	2–3
3	Skive IK	32	9	9	14	36	39	−3	36		2–2	1–3	—	1–2	0–1	3–0
4	Brabrand IF	32	9	9	14	31	50	−19	36		1–4	0–2	1–1	—	1–2	2–0
5	Middelfart G&BK (R)	32	8	8	16	34	56	−22	32	Relegation to 3rd Division	0–2	3–2	1–1	1–2	—	2–0
6	FA 2000 (R)	32	6	9	17	29	54	−25	27	Relegation to 3rd Division	0–2	1–2	0–3	2–0	2–4	—

Updated to match(es) played on 11 June 2022. Source: Danish Football Association (in Danish), Soccerway
Legend: Blue = home team win; Yellow = draw; Red = away team win.
Rules for classification: 1) Points; 2) Goal difference; 3) Goals scored; 4) Away goals scored; 5) Play-off (played on neutral ground if determining teams for different rounds); 6) Draw. ]
(R) Relegated
