= Stückler =

Stückler is a surname. Notable people with the surname include:

- Christoph Stückler, Austrian footballer
- Daniel Stückler (born 1997), Danish footballer
- David Stückler (born 2004), Danish footballer
- Samuel Stückler, Austrian association footballer
- Stephan Stückler, Austrian footballer
