= 2024–25 Danish 2nd Division =

34th season of Danish 2nd Division

Danish 2nd Division
- Season: 2024–25
- All statistics correct as of 23 July 2024.

The 2024–25 Danish 2nd Division was the 34th season of the Danish 2nd Division since its establishment in 1991. The season started on 2 August 2024 with a group of twelve teams. After 22 rounds the group was split in a promotion group and a relegation group. The top two teams of the promotion group were promoted to the 2024–25 Danish 1st Division.

Næstved and FC Helsingør finished the 2023–24 season of the Danish 1st Division in 11th and 12th place, respectively, and were relegated to the 2nd Division. They replaced Esbjerg fB and FC Roskilde, who were promoted to the 2024–25 Danish 1st Division.

== Stadia and locations ==
Locations of the 2023–24 Danish 2nd Division teams. Copenhagen teams: Akademisk Boldklub, HIK, BK Frem and Fremad Amager

Club	Location	Stadium	Turf	Capacity	2023–24 position
Aarhus Fremad	Aarhus	Riisvangen Stadium	Natural	5,000	3rd
Akademisk Boldklub	Gladsaxe	Gladsaxe Stadium	Natural	13,800	5th
BK Frem	Valby	Valby Idrætspark	Natural	12,000	1st in 3D
Ishøj IF	Ishøj	Ishøj Idrætscenter	Natural	1,500	2nd in 3D
Næstved BK	Næstved	MTM Service Park	Hybrid	7,500	11th in 1D
Fremad Amager	Copenhagen	Sundby Idrætspark	Artificial	7,200	7th
HIK	Hellerup	Gentofte Sportspark	Natural	15,000	10th
Middelfart G&BK	Middelfart	Middelfart Stadion	Natural	4,100	4th
Nykøbing FC	Nykøbing Falster	Lollands Bank Park	Natural	10,000	6th
FC Helsingør	Helsingør	Helsingør Stadion	Natural	4,500	12th in 1D
Skive IK	Skive	SPAR Nord Arena	Natural	10,000	8th
Thisted FC	Thisted	Sparekassen Thy Arena	Natural	3,000	9th

== League table ==
Pos	Team	Pld	W	D	L	GF	GA	GD	Pts	Promotion or Relegation
1	Aarhus Fremad	22	14	2	6	38	17	+21	44	Qualification to Promotion Group
2	Fremad Amager	22	13	3	6	33	23	+10	42	Qualification to Promotion Group
3	Middelfart BK	22	12	4	6	35	23	+12	40	Qualification to Promotion Group
4	Skive IK	22	9	5	8	26	25	+1	32	Qualification to Promotion Group
5	Næstved BK	22	9	5	8	23	26	−3	32	Qualification to Promotion Group
6	Akademisk Boldklub	22	8	7	7	33	28	+5	31	Qualification to Promotion Group
7	BK Frem	22	8	6	8	25	23	+2	30	Qualification to Relegation Group
8	HIK	22	8	4	10	22	27	−5	28	Qualification to Relegation Group
9	Ishøj IF	22	7	6	9	24	29	−5	27	Qualification to Relegation Group
10	FC Helsingør	22	6	8	8	27	29	−2	26	Qualification to Relegation Group
11	Thisted FC	22	5	7	10	19	29	−10	22	Qualification to Relegation Group
12	Nykøbing FC	22	3	3	16	15	41	−26	12	Qualification to Relegation Group

Rules for classification: 1) points; 2) goal difference; 3) number of goals scored

== Promotion Group ==
The top 6 teams will compete for 2 spots in the 2025–26 Danish 1st Division. Points and goals carried over in full from the regular season.

Pos	Team	Pld	W	D	L	GF	GA	GD	Pts	Qualification or relegation	AAF	MID	FAM	ABG	SKI	NBK
1	Aarhus Fremad (C, P)	32	18	6	8	55	23	+32	60	Promotion to 1st Division	—	0–0	1–1	1–2	1–2	7–0
2	Middelfart BK (P)	32	17	8	7	46	30	+16	59	Promotion to 1st Division	0–0	—	3–1	1–0	1–0	3–0
3	Fremad Amager	32	16	7	9	42	37	+5	55		0–1	1–1	—	1–1	1–1	1–0
4	Akademisk Boldklub	32	14	9	9	55	36	+19	51		0–2	4–0	5–0	—	5–1	1–1
5	Skive IK	32	11	8	13	36	42	−6	41		1–1	1–1	0–1	1–3	—	0–2
6	Næstved BK	32	10	6	16	28	48	−20	36		0–3	0–1	1–2	0–1	1–3	—

Legend: Blue = home team win; Yellow = draw; Red = away team win.
Rules for classification: 1) Points; 2) Goal difference; 3) Goals scored; 4) Away goals scored; 5) Play-off (played on neutral ground if determining teams for different rounds); 6) Draw.
(C) Champions; (P) Promoted

== Relegation Group ==
The bottom 6 teams will compete to avoid the 2 relegations to the 2025–26 Danish 3rd Division. Points and goals carried over in full from the regular season.

Pos	Team	Pld	W	D	L	GF	GA	GD	Pts	Qualification or relegation	ISH	THI	HIK	HEL	FRE	NYK
1	Ishøj IF	32	11	10	11	44	45	−1	43		—	3–4	1–1	3–2	3–0	2–1
2	Thisted FC	32	10	11	11	39	43	−4	41		3–3	—	1–1	1–2	1–1	1–1
3	HIK	32	11	7	14	32	44	−12	40		1–0	0–2	—	0–6	4–1	1–1
4	FC Helsingør	32	9	12	11	49	46	+3	39		2–2	2–3	1–2	—	1–0	2–2
5	BK Frem (R)	32	9	10	13	33	38	−5	37	Relegation to 3rd Division	1–1	0–2	3–0	1–1	—	0–1
6	Nykøbing FC (R)	32	5	8	19	28	55	−27	23	Relegation to 3rd Division	1–2	1–2	1–0	3–3	1–1	—

Legend: Blue = home team win; Yellow = draw; Red = away team win.
Rules for classification: 1) Points; 2) Goal difference; 3) Goals scored; 4) Away goals scored; 5) Play-off (played on neutral ground if determining teams for different rounds); 6) Draw.
(R) Relegated
