= Danish Football Supporter Association =

Danish Football Supporter Association (Danish: Danske Fodbold Fanklubber), also known as DFF, is the official association of fanclubs of the football (soccer) teams of Denmark. It was founded in the fall of 2003 by representatives from 20 official football fanclubs from the highest leagues of Danish football.

== Organization ==
DFF was formerly known as Superligaens Fanklub Forening, which only served the interests of the fanclubs of teams playing in the top-flight Danish Superliga. As a need to strengthen the ties between the Superliga and the lower divisions arose, DFF was created to serve as an umbrella organization for all official football fanclubs. That is, fanclubs from the three highest leagues in Danish football, who have been officially endorsed by their respective football clubs. In addition to the fan clubs of Danish clubs, the Roligan supporters of the Danish national team in De Danske Roligans are also members of DFF.

The members of DFF elect a board on general assembly, with board members working in different committees, as well as in ad hoc working groups. Among other things, DFF works on increasing fan safety at football matches, and the prevention of violence, racism and vandalism among the fans.

== Members ==
The members of DFF include football fan clubs of the clubs playing in the Danish Superliga, the Danish 1st, 2nd Division, 3rd Division, Denmark Series and the Denmark national football team. The reorganization of the federation meant an increasing flow of members, giving it more than 40,000 members, registered in 23 official football fan clubs.

Fan club	Team
Aab Support Club	Aalborg BK
AB Forever	Akademisk Boldklub
AGF Fanclub Aarhus	Aarhus GF
B.93 Fanklub	B.93
BK Frem Support	BK Frem
Black Wolves	FC Midtjylland
Blue Knights	Esbjerg fB
Brøndby Support	Brøndby IF
Den Gule Fare	AC Horsens
Den Blå Bølge	Greve Fodbold
De Danske Roligans	Danish national team
De Gule Fugle	AB70
De Blå/Hvide Engle	Fremad Amager
De Grønne fra Næstved	Næstved BK
De Grønne Supportere	BK Avarta
De Stribede	Odense BK
Fanafdelingen i Brøndbyernes IF	Brøndby IF
FCK Fanclub	F.C. Copenhagen
FC Helsingør Fodboldfans	FC Helsingør
FC Roskilde Fan Club	FC Roskilde
Fynske Roligans	Danish national team
HB Køge Support	HB Køge
Holbæk Blue Sharks	Holbæk B&I
Hvidovre Fanklub	Hvidovre IF
Lyngby Fans	Lyngby BK
Randers FC Support	Randers FC
Rebels United	Hobro IK
Roligan Kolding	Danish national team
Roliganklubben Bornholm	Danish national team
Roliganklubben Trekanten	Danish national team
SIFosis	Silkeborg IF
SønderjyskE Fodbold Support	SønderjyskE
The Crazy Reds	Vejle BK
Wild Tigers	FC Nordsjælland

=== Former members ===
- FAN Fyn (FC Fyn)
- Herfølge Support (Herfølge BK)
- Køge Support (-2007, Køge BK)
- Blue Vikings (1994-2016, Lyngby BK)
- Red Viking (FC Vestsjælland)
- Tigers (Odense BK)
