= Daniel Stückler =

Danish footballer (born 1997)

Personal information
- Full name: Daniel Gharabaghi Stückler
- Date of birth: 13 April 1997 (age 29)
- Place of birth: Herlev, Denmark
- Height: 1.84 m (6 ft 0 in)
- Position: Forward

Team information
- Current team: Ishøj

Youth career
- –2012: Herlev IF
- 2012–2013: Lyngby
- 2014–2016: Brøndby

Senior career*
Years	Team	Apps	(Gls)
2014–2016	Brøndby	9	(1)
2017	HB Køge	8	(0)
2017–2018	Helsingør	6	(0)
2018–2019	Lyngby	10	(0)
2019–2021	B.93	35	(11)
2021–2023	Ishøj	53	(42)
2023–2026	FC Gladsaxe		
2026–	Ishøj	8	(1)

International career
2012–2013	Denmark U16	11	(5)
2013–2014	Denmark U17	13	(6)
2015	Denmark U18	4	(2)
2014–2016	Denmark U19	14	(3)
- * Club domestic league appearances and goals as of 4 October 2026

Daniel Gharabaghi Stückler (Persian: دنیل قره باغی اشتاکلر; born 13 April 1997) is a Danish footballer who plays as a forward for Danish 3rd Division club Ishøj. He is of Austrian and Iranian descent, and has represented Denmark at several youth levels.

== Career ==
=== Brøndby ===
On 31 January 2014, Stückler signed a three-year contract with Brøndby IF which tied him to the club until the end of 2016, with a €100,000 transfer being paid to Lyngby BK.

He made his debut (in jersey number 34) at the age of 17 years and 14 days as the youngest player ever in the club history and also became the first player born in 1997 to make a league debut. Magnus Warming later became the youngest debutante for Brøndby IF during 2017.

In the 2014–15 season Stückler played for Brøndby IF's U19-team which finished sixth in the table after 22 matches while he scored 12 goals which placed him third on the list of top-scorers.

Daniel was officially promoted to the first team during the winter break. On 9 December 2016, Brøndby announced that Stückler would leave the club at the end of the year.

=== HB Køge ===
On 30 December 2016, it was announced that Stückler had signed a contract with HB Køge and would join the club in January 2017. He left the club again in summer 2017.

=== Helsingør ===
On 28 July 2017, Stückler signed a contract with Danish Superliga side FC Helsingør. He made his debut on 29 September 2017 as a second-half substitute in a 5–1 loss against AGF.

=== Lyngby ===
On 9 July 2018, Stückler signed a contract with Danish 1st Division club Lyngby. He left the club at the end of the season.

=== B.93 ===
On 22 July 2019 B.93 announced, that Stückler had joined the club. Stückler left B.93 again at the end of the 2020–21 season.

=== Ishøj ===
On 2 August 2021, Stückler joined Denmark Series club Ishøj IF. He immediately made an impact in his debut, scoring a brace to help his side to a 4–1 win over Herstedøster IC on 7 August 2021. During his first season at the club, Stückler scored 20 goals in 25 league appearances, and contributed strongly to the team's promotion to the Danish 3rd Division.

Stückler scored his first hat-trick for the club on 8 October 2022 in a 8–1 victory against Dalum.

He left Ishøj after finishing as top goalscorer of the Danish 3rd Division in the 2022–23 season with 22 goals, to focus on his civil career as a lawyer.

=== VB 1968 ===
In August 2023, Stückler joined Denmark Series club VB 1968.

== International career ==
Stückler represented Denmark at various youth levels from 2012 to 2016. Although born in Denmark, Stückler is eligible to represent Iran and Austria through his parents and stated that he would consider a call-up from the Iranian national football team.

== Personal life ==
Stückler studies law besides his career as a footballer, and has worked at law firm Mazanti-Andersen, where he has specialised in business law. His brother, David Gharabaghi Stückler, plays for Cremonese.

== Career statistics ==
As of match played 11 November 2023

Appearances and goals by club, season and competition
Club	Season	League			Danish Cup		Europe		Total	
Club	Season	Division	Apps	Goals	Apps	Goals	Apps	Goals	Apps	Goals
Brøndby	2013–14	Superliga	1	0	0	0	—		1	0
Brøndby	2014–15	Superliga	0	0	0	0	—		0	0
Brøndby	2015–16	Superliga	7	1	0	0	2 (Note: Appearances in UEFA Europa League)	0	9	1
Brøndby	2016–17	Superliga	1	0	0	0	3	2	4	2
Brøndby	Total		9	1	0	0	5	2	14	3
HB Køge	2016–17	1st Division	8	0	1	0	—		9	0
Helsingør	2017–18	Superliga	9	0	3	1	—		12	1
Lyngby	2018–19	1st Division	10	0	1	0	—		11	0
B.93	2019–20	2nd Division	19	9	1	0	—		20	9
B.93	2020–21	2nd Division	16	2	2	1	—		18	3
B.93	Total		35	11	3	1	—		38	12
Ishøj	2021–22	Denmark Series	25	20	0	0	—		25	20
Ishøj	2022–23	3rd Division	28	22	3	2	—		31	24
Ishøj	Total		53	42	3	2	—		56	44
VB 1968	2023–24	Denmark Series	13	6	—		—		13	6
Career total			134	60	11	4	5	2	150	66

== Honours ==
Ishøj

- Denmark Series – Group 1: 2021–22
