= 2022–23 Danish 1st Division =

83rd season of Danish 1st Division

NordicBet Liga
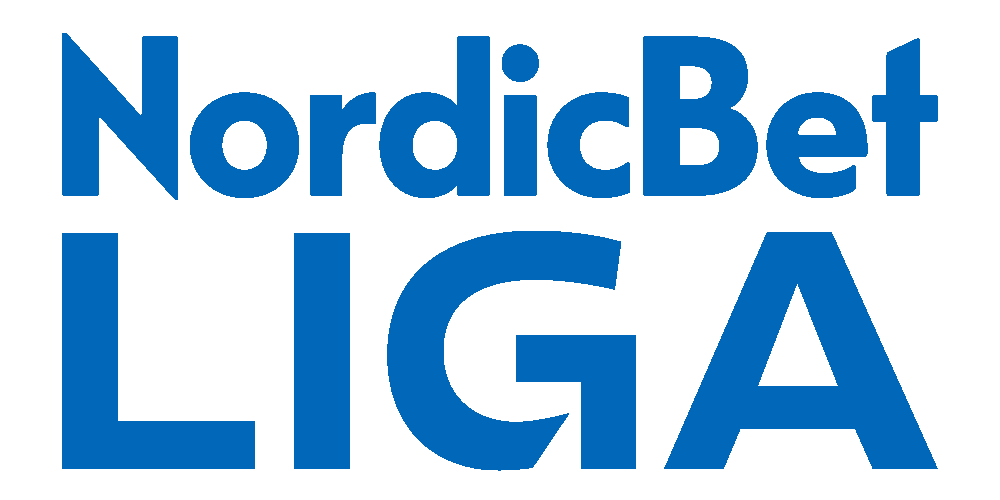
- Season: 2022–23
- Champions: Vejle; 9th Danish 1st Division title 5th title at second-tier level
- Promoted: Vejle; Hvidovre
- Relegated: Fremad Amager; Nykøbing
- Matches: 192
- Goals: 588 (3.06 per match)
- Top goalscorer: Emil Frederiksen (Sønderjyske) (16 goals)
- Biggest home win: Vejle Boldklub 6–0 Næstved (17 August 2022); Hvidovre 6–0 Hobro (1 September 2022)
- Biggest away win: Helsingør 0–6; Vejle (23 July 2022)
- Highest scoring: Nykøbing 4–5 Vejle (29 October 2022)
- Highest attendance: 5,449; Vejle 3–1 Fredericia (12 March 2023)
- Lowest attendance: 301; Hillerød 2–0 Næstved (11 March 2023)
- Average attendance: 1,495

The 2022–23 Danish 1st Division (known as the NordicBet Liga due to sponsorship by NordicBet) marked the 27th season of the league operating as the second tier of Danish football and the 83rd season overall under the 1st Division name. The league is governed by the Danish Football Association (DBU).

== Participants ==
Sønderjyske and Vejle finished the 2021–22 season of the Superliga in 11th and 12th place, respectively, and were relegated to the 1st Division. They replaced AC Horsens and Lyngby Boldklub, who were promoted to the 2022–23 Danish Superliga.

Næstved BK and Hillerød won promotion from the 2021–22 Danish 2nd Division. They replaced Esbjerg fB and Jammerbugt.

=== Stadia and locations ===
Locations of the 2022–23 Danish 1st Division teams.

Club	Location	Stadium	Turf	Capacity	2021–22 position
FC Helsingør	Helsingør	Helsingør Stadion	Natural	4,500	4th
FC Fredericia	Fredericia	Monjasa Park	Natural	4,000	5th
BK Fremad Amager	Copenhagen	Sundby Idrætspark	Artificial	7,200	10th
HB Køge	Herfølge/Køge	Capelli Sport Stadion	Artificial	4,000	7th
Hillerød Fodbold	Hillerød	Hillerød Stadion; Helsingør Stadion (2023)	Artificial; Natural	5,000; 4,500	2nd 2D
Hobro IK	Hobro	DS Arena	Natural	10,700	8th
Hvidovre IF	Hvidovre	Hvidovre Stadion	Natural	12,000	3rd
Nykøbing FC	Nykøbing Falster	CM Arena	Natural	10,000	6th
Næstved BK	Næstved	Tintshop Park	Natural	7,500	1st 2D
SønderjyskE	Haderslev	Sydbank Park	Natural	10,000	12th SL
Vejle	Vejle	Vejle Stadion	Natural	10,418	11th SL
Vendsyssel FF	Hjørring	Hjørring Stadion	Natural	7,500	9th

=== Personnel and sponsoring ===
Note: Flags indicate national team as has been defined under FIFA eligibility rules. Players and Managers may hold more than one non-FIFA nationality.

Team	Head coach	Captain	Kit manufacturer	Shirt sponsor
FC Fredericia	(Denmark) Michael Hansen	(Denmark) Christian Ege Nielsen	Hummel	Monjasa
FC Helsingør	(Denmark) Daniel K. Pedersen	(Denmark) Nikolaj Hansen	Diadora	GardinXperten
BK Fremad Amager	(Denmark) Carit Falch	(Denmark) Pierre Kanstrup	Adidas	Øens Erhvervsnetværk
HB Køge	(Denmark) Daniel Agger	(Guinea-Bissau) Eddi Gomes	Capelli	Castus
Hillerød Fodbold	(Denmark) Christian Lønstrup	(Denmark) Jonathan Witt	Adidas	Dansk Varme Service
Hobro IK	(Denmark) Martin Thomsen	(Denmark) Jonas Damborg	Puma	DS Gruppen, Spar Nord
Hvidovre IF	(Denmark) Per Frandsen	(Denmark) Christopher Østberg	Nike	KBS Byg
Nykøbing FC	(Denmark) Claus Jensen	(Denmark) Lars Pleidrup	Nike	Jyske Bank
Næstved BK	(Denmark) Peter Bonde	(Denmark) Jesper Christiansen	Joma	Sydbank, Meny, Mærk Næstved
SønderjyskE	(Denmark) Thomas Nørgaard	(Denmark) Marc Dal Hende	Hummel	Danfoss
Vejle Boldklub	(Croatia) Ivan Prelec	(Denmark) Jacob Schoop	Hummel	Arbejdernes Landsbank
Vendsyssel FF	(Denmark) Henrik Pedersen	(Denmark) Mikkel Wohlgemuth	Select	Nordjyske Bank

=== Managerial changes ===
Team	Outgoing manager	Manner of departure	Date of vacancy	Replaced by	Date of appointment	Position in table
Fremad Amager	(Denmark) Peter Løvenkrands	Mutual consent	17 June 2022	(Denmark) Michael Hemmingsen	28 June 2022	Pre-season
SønderjyskE	(Denmark) Henrik Hansen	Sacked	5 November 2022	(Denmark) Thomas Nørgaard	15 December 2022	3rd
Fremad Amager	(Denmark) Michael Hemmingsen	Sacked	2 December 2022	(Denmark) Carit Falch	4 January 2023	9th
FC Helsingør	(Denmark) Morten Eskesen	Signed by Denmark U18	13 January 2023	(Denmark) Daniel K. Pedersen	14 February 2023	5th

== League table ==
Pos	Team	Pld	W	D	L	GF	GA	GD	Pts	Promotion or Relegation
1	Vejle Boldklub	22	16	2	4	47	20	+27	50	Qualification to Promotion Group
2	Hvidovre IF	22	13	5	4	50	28	+22	44	Qualification to Promotion Group
3	FC Helsingør	22	12	1	9	32	35	−3	37	Qualification to Promotion Group
4	SønderjyskE	22	10	5	7	41	29	+12	35	Qualification to Promotion Group
5	Vendsyssel FF	22	10	3	9	35	31	+4	33	Qualification to Promotion Group
6	Næstved BK	22	8	8	6	32	26	+6	32	Qualification to Promotion Group
7	Hillerød Fodbold	22	9	4	9	29	35	−6	31	Qualification to Relegation Group
8	HB Køge	22	7	4	11	29	33	−4	25	Qualification to Relegation Group
9	Hobro IK	22	5	8	9	19	30	−11	23	Qualification to Relegation Group
10	Fremad Amager	22	7	2	13	25	42	−17	23	Qualification to Relegation Group
11	FC Fredericia	22	6	3	13	29	40	−11	21	Qualification to Relegation Group
12	Nykøbing FC	22	4	5	13	26	44	−18	17	Qualification to Relegation Group

Updated to match(es) played on 18 March 2023. Source:
Rules for classification: 1) points; 2) goal difference; 3) number of goals scored

=== Positions by round ===
Team ╲ Round	1	2	3	4	5	6	7	8	9	10	11	12	13	14	15	16	17	18	19	20	21	22
Vejle Boldklub	1	1	1	2	1	1	1	1	1	1	1	1	1	1	1	1	1	1	1	1	1	1
Hvidovre IF	5	4	3	3	2	2	2	2	2	2	2	2	2	2	2	2	2	2	2	2	2	2
FC Helsingør	12	11	8	9	7	6	5	5	4	5	6	6	6	6	6	4	4	6	6	6	4	3
SønderjyskE	3	2	2	1	4	3	3	3	3	3	3	3	4	5	3	5	5	5	5	5	3	4
Vendsyssel FF	2	3	5	4	3	4	4	6	5	6	5	5	5	4	5	6	6	4	3	3	5	5
Næstved BK	6	5	4	5	5	5	6	4	6	4	4	4	3	3	4	3	3	3	4	4	6	6
HB Køge	8	8	10	7	6	7	7	7	7	7	7	7	7	7	7	7	7	7	7	7	7	7
Hillerød Fodbold	11	12	12	12	10	11	11	11	11	10	11	10	11	10	8	8	8	8	8	8	8	8
Hobro IK	9	6	6	8	9	8	8	9	10	11	10	11	8	8	9	10	10	9	10	10	9	9
Fremad Amager	10	10	7	6	8	10	10	8	8	8	9	9	10	9	10	9	9	10	9	9	10	10
FC Fredericia	4	7	9	10	11	9	9	10	9	9	8	8	9	11	11	11	11	11	11	11	11	11
Nykøbing FC	7	9	11	11	12	12	12	12	12	12	12	12	12	12	12	12	12	12	12	12	12	12

Updated to match(es) played on 18 March 2023. Source: Worldfootball

== Promotion Group ==
The top 6 teams will compete for 2 spots in the 2023–24 Danish Superliga. Points and goals carried over in full from the regular season.

Pos	Team	Pld	W	D	L	GF	GA	GD	Pts	Qualification or relegation	VEJ	HVI	SØN	VEN	NST	HEL
1	Vejle Boldklub (C, P)	32	20	7	5	61	30	+31	67	Promotion to Danish Superliga	—	0–0	1–2	4–3	3–1	2–1
2	Hvidovre IF (P)	32	17	7	8	65	41	+24	58	Promotion to Danish Superliga	0–1	—	1–2	0–0	2–3	3–2
3	SønderjyskE	32	16	8	8	60	45	+15	56		1–1	0–3	—	1–1	1–0	3–2
4	Vendsyssel FF	32	13	7	12	48	43	+5	46		0–0	2–3	0–1	—	2–1	2–0
5	Næstved BK	32	11	10	11	50	48	+2	43		1–1	3–2	3–3	2–3	—	2–1
6	FC Helsingør	32	13	3	16	47	54	−7	42		1–1	0–1	4–5	0–0	4–2	—

Legend: Blue = home team win; Yellow = draw; Red = away team win.
Rules for classification: 1) Points; 2) Goal difference; 3) Goals scored; 4) Away goals scored; 5) Play-off (played on neutral ground if determining teams for different rounds); 6) Draw.
(C) Champions; (P) Promoted

Positions by round

Team ╲ Round	23	24	25	26	27	28	29	30	31	32
Vejle Boldklub	1	1	1	1	1	1	1	1	1	1
Hvidovre IF	2	2	2	2	2	2	2	2	2	2
SønderjyskE	3	3	3	3	3	3	3	3	3	3
Vendsyssel FF	6	6	6	5	5	5	4	4	4	4
Næstved BK	5	5	5	6	6	6	6	6	6	5
FC Helsingør	4	4	4	4	4	4	5	5	5	6

Updated to match(es) played on 4 June 2023. Source: Worldfootball

== Relegation Group ==
The bottom 6 teams will compete to avoid the 2 relegations to the 2023–24 Danish 2nd Division. Points and goals carried over in full from the regular season.

Pos	Team	Pld	W	D	L	GF	GA	GD	Pts	Qualification or relegation	FRE	HBK	HIL	HOB	AMA	NYK
1	FC Fredericia	32	13	6	13	56	48	+8	45		—	6–1	4–0	2–2	0–0	2–0
2	HB Køge	32	13	5	14	50	51	−1	44		2–2	—	2–0	1–3	4–2	3–1
3	Hillerød Fodbold	32	12	5	15	37	51	−14	41		1–2	1–0	—	0–0	1–0	2–0
4	Hobro IK	32	9	11	12	33	42	−9	38		0–1	0–2	2–1	—	1–2	3–1
5	Fremad Amager (R)	32	10	4	18	38	60	−22	34	Relegation to 2nd Division	1–3	0–1	1–0	1–1	—	4–3
6	Nykøbing FC (R)	32	6	5	21	43	73	−30	23	Relegation to 2nd Division	1–5	3–5	5–3	1–2	2–1	—

Updated to match(es) played on 2 June 2023. Source:
Legend: Blue = home team win; Yellow = draw; Red = away team win.
Rules for classification: 1) Points; 2) Goal difference; 3) Goals scored; 4) Away goals scored; 5) Play-off (played on neutral ground if determining teams for different rounds); 6) Draw.
(R) Relegated

Positions by round

Team ╲ Round	23	24	25	26	27	28	29	30	31	32
FC Fredericia	10	10	8	8	8	7	7	8	7	7
HB Køge	9	9	10	10	9	8	8	9	8	8
Hillerød Fodbold	7	7	7	7	7	9	9	7	9	9
Hobro IK	8	8	9	9	10	10	10	10	10	10
Fremad Amager	11	11	11	11	11	11	11	11	11	11
Nykøbing FC	12	12	12	12	12	12	12	12	12	12

Updated to match(es) played on 2 June 2023. Source: Worldfootball

== Attendances ==
#	Club	Average
1	Vejle	4,549
2	SønderjyskE	2,778
3	Hvidovre	2,381
4	Næstved	1,784
5	Fremad	1,360
6	Hobro	984
7	Helsingør	982
8	Køge	961
9	Fredericia	945
10	Vendsyssel	911
11	Nykøbing	766
12	Hillerød	594
