= David Stückler =

Danish footballer (born 2004)

Personal information
- Full name: David Gharabaghi Stückler
- Date of birth: 7 October 2004 (age 22)
- Place of birth: Herlev, Denmark
- Height: 1.88 m (6 ft 2 in)
- Position: Forward

Team information
- Current team: Cremonese

Youth career
- Nordsjælland
- –2022: AB
- 2022–2024: Cremonese

Senior career*
Years	Team	Apps	(Gls)
2024–	Cremonese	2	(1)
2024–2025	→ Giana Erminio (loan)	34	(13)
2025–2026	→ Vicenza (loan)	37	(13)
- * Club domestic league appearances and goals as of 12:51, 18 November 2026 (UTC)

David Gharabaghi Stückler (born 7 October 2004) is a Danish professional footballer who plays as a forward for Serie B club Cremonese.

== Early life ==
Stückler was born on 7 October 2004 in Herlev, Denmark. Born to an Iranian father and an Austrian mother, he has two older siblings, one of which is Daniel Stückler.

== Career ==
As a youth player, Stückler joined the youth academy of Danish side Nordsjælland. Following his stint there, he joined the youth academy of Danish side AB. During the summer of 2022, he joined the youth academy of Italian side Cremonese, notably scoring 30 goals and providing 11 assists in 27 league matches during the 2023–24 season, where he became the youth league's top scorer and helped the Cremonese U-19 side win the league championship. Ahead of the 2024–25 Serie C season, he was sent on loan to Giana Erminio, where he scored sixteen goals in 45 games.

On 2 August 2025, Stückler was loaned by Serie C side Vicenza. He scored a goal on his league debut for Vicenza on 24 August 2025 against Lumezzane. In November 2025, he was awarded the Newcomer of the Year award for Group A of Serie C. By March 2026, Stückler became the top goal scorer of the league with 11 league goals and helped lead Vicenza to promotion to the Serie B. After his loan spell, Stückler signed a contract extension with Cremonese in July 2026.

== Style of play ==
Stückler plays as a forward and is right-footed. Italian news website La Casa di C wrote in 2024 that he is "strong in tight spaces and very good at communicating with his teammates, characteristics that combine with his ability to dominate in the air, making him a relentless finisher".

== Career statistics ==
As of 22 March 2026

== Honours ==
Individual

- Serie C Group A Newcomer of the Year: 2025
