= Forum Horsens Stadium =

Football stadium in Horsens, Denmark

Coordinates: 55°52′18″N 9°51′26″E

Forum Horsens Stadium Hybel Arena Horsens
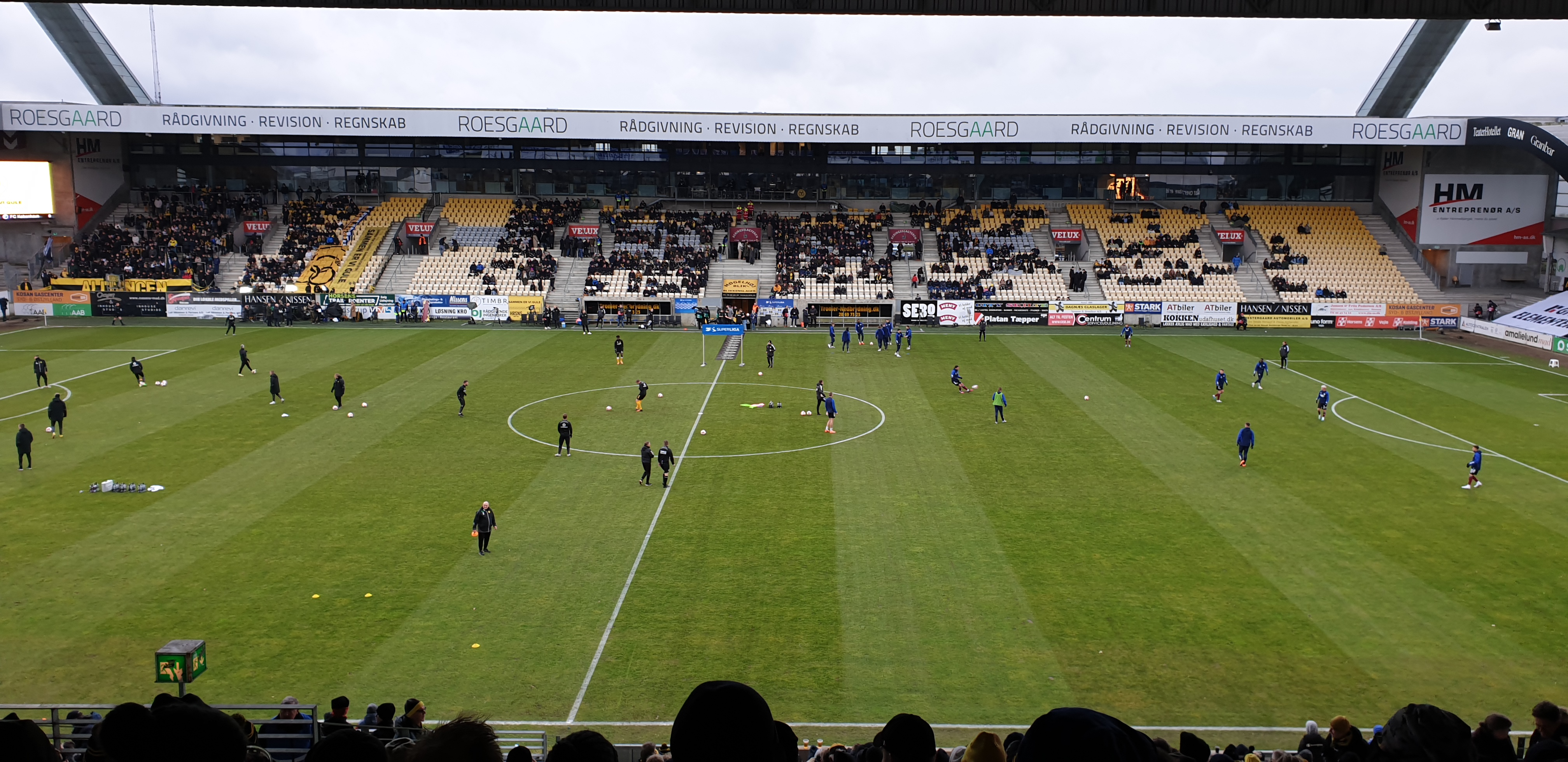
- Interactive map of Forum Horsens Stadium; Hybel Arena Horsens
- Full name: Hybel Arena Horsens
- Former names: Horsens Idrætspark (1927–present); CASA Arena (2008–2022); Nordstern Arena Horsens (2022–2026); Hybel Arena Horsens (2026–present)
- Location: Langmarksvej 59, 8700 Horsens
- Capacity: 10,400
- Surface: Grass
- Field size: 68 x 105

Construction
- Built: 1927
- Renovated: 2009

Tenant
- AC Horsens (1994-present)

Forum Horsens Stadium, known as Hybel Arena Horsens for sponsorship reasons, is a stadium in Horsens, Denmark. Used primarily for football, it is the home ground of AC Horsens and has a capacity of 10,400, of which 7,500 is seated. The stadium is also used for speedway and as a concert venue. The adjacent indoor venue is Forum Horsens.

The Rolling Stones were the first band to play a concert at the stadium. On 29 March 2005, Irish vocal pop band Westlife held a concert for their The No 1's Tour supporting their album Allow Us to Be Frank. Madonna's concert in 2006 became the biggest concert in Horsens history with 85,232 fans in attendance. Recent concerts at the ground have included AC/DC in 2010 on the Black Ice World Tour, U2 in 2010 on the 360 Tour for 2 nights, Bon Jovi as part of the 2011 European leg of The Circle Tour and One Direction on 16 June 2015 during their On the Road Again Tour.

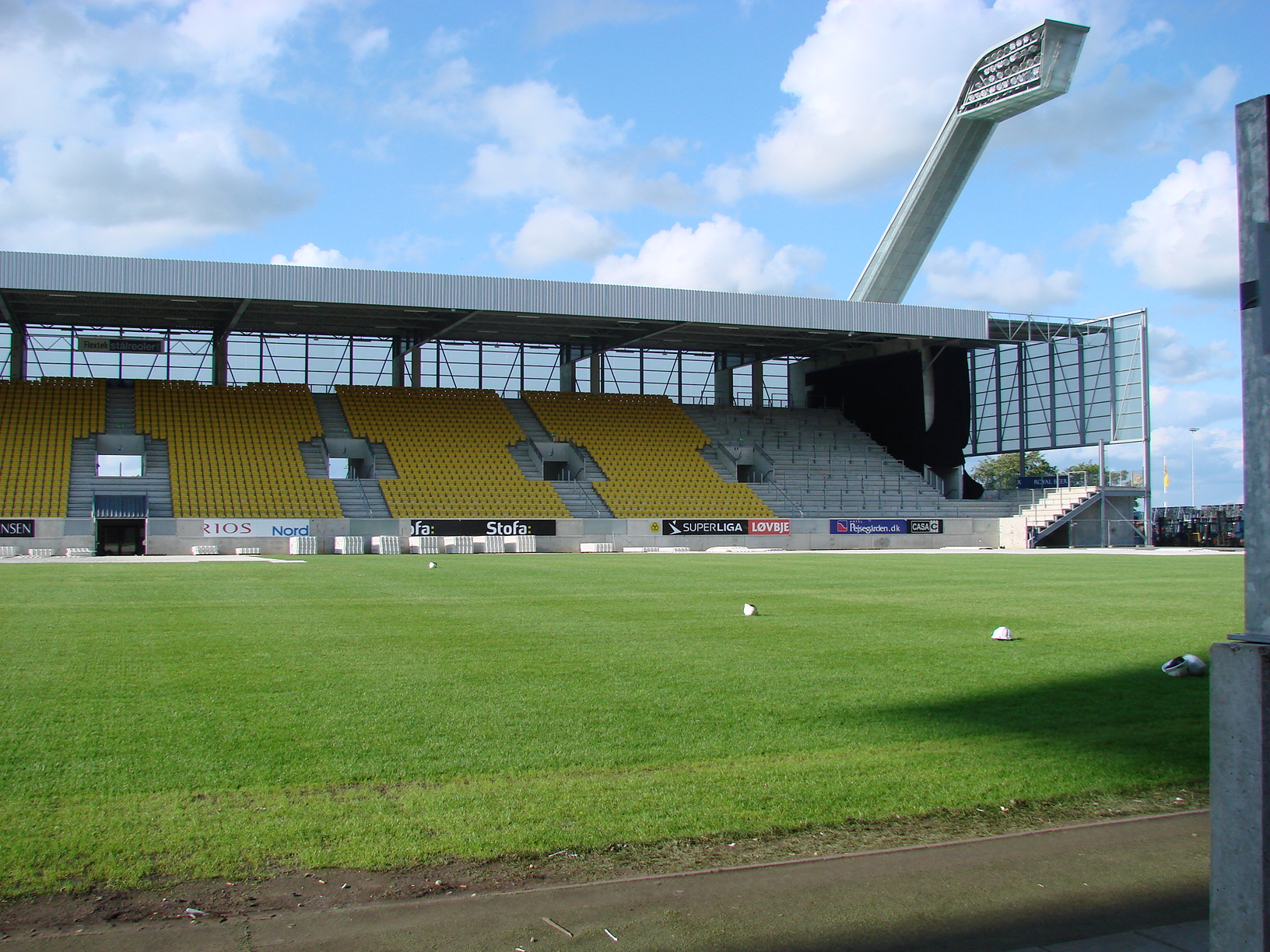
Stadium during renovation

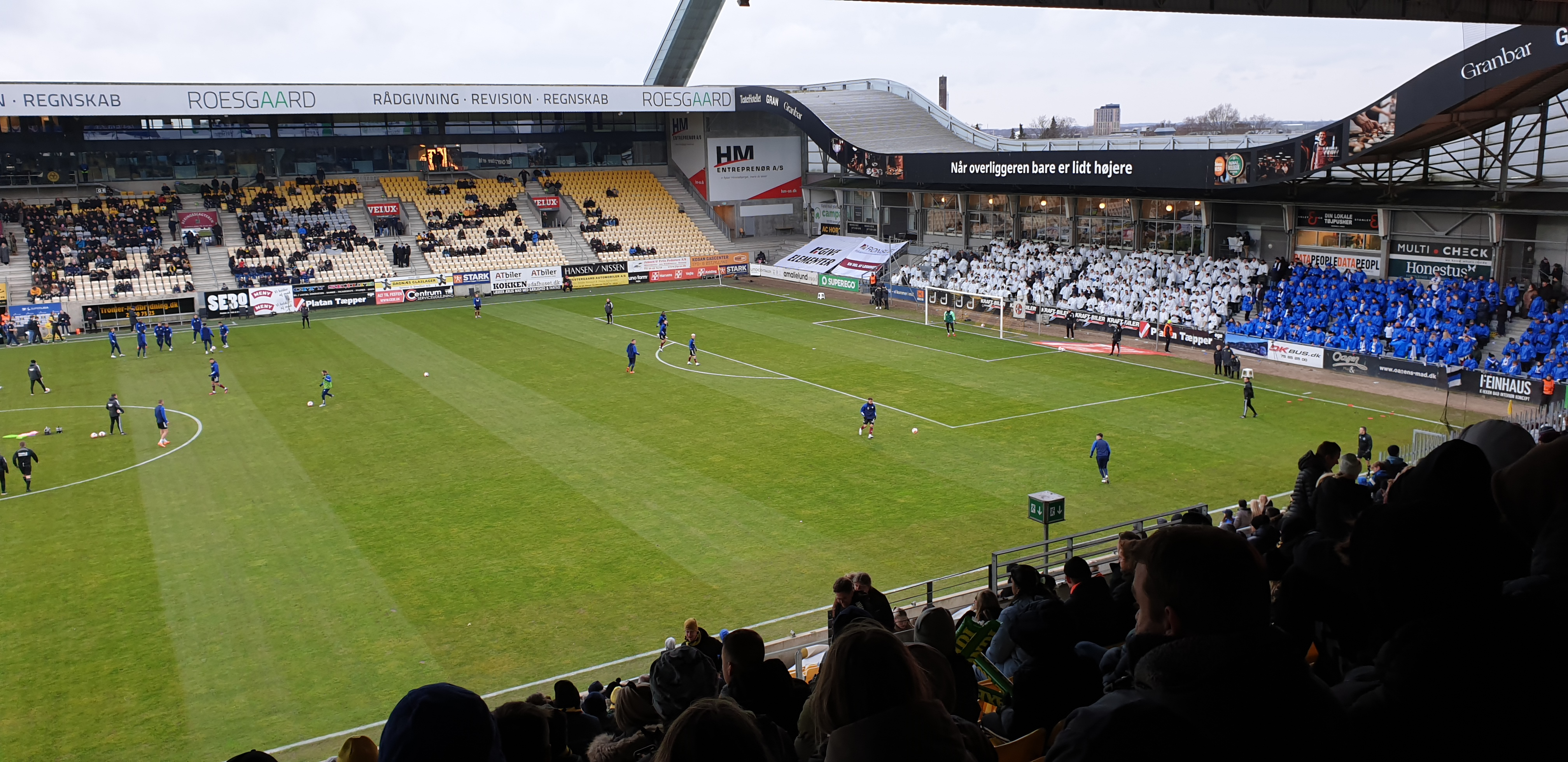
View of the inside of the stadium

In 2015 the Arena became the third venue to host the Speedway Grand Prix of Denmark.

The company behind the reconstruction of Hybel Arena Horsens was 3XN.

== See also ==
- AC Horsens
- List of football stadiums in Denmark
