= Young Boys FD =

Danish football club

- Full name: Young Boys Football Development
- Nicknames: KFUM'erne (The YMCAs)
- Founded: 1 May 1918; 107 years ago
- Ground: JYSK Park, Silkeborg, Denmark
- Capacity: 10,000 (6,000 seated)
- Head coach: Jamie Pinker
- League: 3rd Division
- 2023–24: 3rd Division, 9th of 12
- Website: youngboys.dk
Home colours

Young Boys FD is an association football club based in Silkeborg, Denmark, that competes in the Danish 3rd Division, the fourth tier of the Danish football league system.

Founded in 1918 as Silkeborg KFUM, the club is affiliated to DBU Jutland, the regional football association. The team plays its home matches at JYSK Park, where it has been based since 1970. The club spent most of its history in the regional tiers of Danish football, winning regional Jutland championships multiple times, but never making it to the higher divisions. Ahead of the 2018–19 season, however, Silkeborg KFUM reached promotion to the Denmark Series, the fifth tier of Danish football, for the first time in club history.

== History ==
=== Formation and beginnings (1918–1920) ===
Silkeborg KFUM was formed in Silkeborg by the local YMCA in May 1918, a year after the foundation of the major club in the city, Silkeborg IF. The establishment of Silkeborg KFUM was announced in the May 1918 monthly with the following words:

In regards to sporting events at Færgebakken, all guests and members of HA and UA can participate if a fee is paid to the cashier of KFUM's sport department, assembler Jepsen, who will also administrate registrations. Football will be played on the 1st, 3rd and 4th Sunday of the month, early enough in the morning for us all to make it to Sunday service. Regarding a specific time for playing: this is due for further notice, while we will gather every Wednesday evening between 7:30 and 9 p.m. in the excavation site for evening prayers.

Thus, Færgebakken ("The Ferry Hill") was the site of the club's first home ground. The first matches occurred with some curiosities. Before games could be started, sheep flocks had to be led away from the pitch, and the changing clothes was done in an open field. The teams were diverse and consisted of both children, adolescents and seniors alike. In this varied bunch, some players rose above others in terms of talent. A key player early on was Johannes Rosenløwe, who was a versatile playmaker known for both his strong offensive as well as defensive abilities. He would later become priest in Smidstrup Parish. Another noteworthy player of the early days was Aage Ewald Sørensen, who was club captain and is remembered as an inspirational figure on – but also off – the pitch, where he would continue his career as a sexton in Silkeborg.

=== Inauguration of KFUM Parken and first success (1920–1945) ===
Throughout the 1920s, however, it became clear that conditions at Færgebakken did not meet the demands of the increasingly popular sports club. After short detours to temporary home grounds, Sandgraven and Søholt, a large area was acquired on Sølystvej, where the new home ground, KFUM Parken, was inaugurated in the summer 1930. The stadium was the brainchild of Andreas Andersen, who had been elected to the board in 1925, and had raised money for the construction of the new ground together with other members of the club board. KFUM Parken was to become the main physical framework for the club's activities and social life in the coming decades. The club also participated in the countrywide YMCA tournaments, where they competed against other YMCA teams. In this period, Silkeborg KFUM reached some of its early successes. In 1927, the team won the Northern Jutland championship, but in the final matchup for the Jutland championship, they eventually lost to Esbjerg KFUM, who won the final 4–2. The following year, the club reached the same result, losing to Kolding KFUM. Finally, in 1932 they could celebrate winning the YMCA Jutland championship, when Esbjerg KFUM was beaten 4–3 at Silkeborg Stadium. This was the club's first trophy, and the feat was repeated the following year, in 1933, where the YMCA Jutland championship trophy was regained.

In 1933, the club also chose to follow the example of neighbouring clubs by becoming affiliated to the regional football association, DBU Jutland, which meant that Silkeborg KFUM could compete in the official tournaments under the Danish Football Union. This proved an instant success, as the club already in its first season won B-række, the third regional tier. The first place meant promotion to A-rækken, the second regional tier, where the team quickly established themselves as a solid mid-table side. After consolidating this position for a handful of years, KFUM's first team succeeded in winning the A-række in 1940 after an emphatic 5–1 victory over Alhedens Idrætsforening in the finals. The team of 1940 is considered to be one of the strongest sides in club history. In a 2–3–5 pyramid formation, the players were: Wagner Petersen, Henry Nielsen, Estrup Nielsen, Hans Frederik Christensen, Axel Søeborg, Hjalmar Hansen, Svend Holm, Harald Lohse, Henning Bølcho, Lorentz Sørensen and Poul Madsen.

Two years before, in 1931, Silkeborg KFUM became the first club in the city to host an international match, where a combined side beat Icelandic club Valur in a match that ended 2–1. A second and third international game followed in 1935 and 1936, respectively, against YMCA clubs from Plaistow and Dartford in England.

=== Renovating KFUM Parken and the KFUM spirit (1945–1970) ===
Logo until 2021

At the end of World War II, in 1945, KFUM Parken lay fallow after having been used as a training ground by the occupying forces. On the basis of a fundraising, the ground was immediately restored to its former glory. New association football, handball and tennis courts were constructed, an entrance hall was built, as well as a modern clubhouse. In 1951, after six years of work, the renovated KFUM Parken was reopened, again becoming a gathering place for members of Silkeborg KFUM.

On the pitch, the club's first team did not achieve any noteworthy success in the post-war years. In 1953, the team almost became regional A-række champions again, which would have repeated the triumph of 1940, but Brædstrup IF stood in the way. When the Series structure was introduced by the Danish Football Union in 1965, the team spent most years between Series 3 and Series 4, the eight and ninth tier of the Danish league system, respectively.

It was also in this period that a particular club spirit, KFUM-ånden ("the YMCA spirit") emerged. Several former players from the club became increasingly active in and around the club, becoming coaches in the youth department or members of the board. A key figure was Vagn Ove Jorn, who explained his and others' commitment in the club:

The lending hand which I, as well as the other people in the club, would give, for me, would continue for a longer time than I had initially expected. Why? Because I have never met as many brilliant friends as the ones I met in the football department of KFUM. There was an atmosphere at that old ground, an intimacy, something undefined.

=== Moving to Søholt and youth success (1970–1980) ===
During the 1970s, Silkeborg Municipality decided to build a new multi-sports complex for its inhabitants, and its construction would begin in the late 1960s at Søholt before being completed in 1970, where Silkeborg KFUM moved in alongside other local clubs. The former home ground, KFUM Parken, was sold for DKK 300,000, which were in turn used for building a clubhouse, Idrætshuset, which was inaugurated on 22 August 1971.

Results also improved during the 1970s, especially in the youth ranks. Especially the second half of the 1970s was a golden age for the youth teams. Not only did the department experience rapid growth in terms of players, but its teams also managed to consolidate themselves in the highest regional tiers. In 1974, the club won its Jutland championship in the youth ranks when the under-14 side reached a historic win. In 1976, the under-14 side repeated this success. The strong results meant that Silkeborg KFUM was represented in the championships for under-16 and under-18 in the following years. These development could partly be explained the state-of-the-art facilities at the new home ground, Søholt, which provided KFUM an upper hand in its physical surroundings compared to its competitors. However, there was also the fact that a large group of coaches and managers, not only possessing a high level of commitment and expertise (the club made sure that all its coaches took the necessary training courses) but also people with a special bond to Silkeborg KFUM. These factors produced a flourishing sense of togetherness in the club. During this period, the results in the youth sides made KFUM mostly known for its strong academy, while the first team was still competing in the lower regional tiers of the DBU Jutland.

=== Rise of the first team (1980–2000) ===
As a natural consequence of the cohesiveness in the club as well as the high level of the youth department in the second half of the 1970s, the first team began to assert itself in the 1980s after some relatively meagre years. In 1981, the club's first team managed to reach promotion from Series 4 to Series 3. Per Baltzer had assumed the position of head coach before the success; someone who had been one of the club's greatest talents as a player. Baltzer had started coaching at an early age, where he was responsible for several of the club's youth teams, before he was promoted to first team coach in 1981 at the age of just 25. The year after, in 1982, the first team effortlessly won Series 3, securing its first promotion to Series 2 in decades. After suffering relegation from Series 2 in 1987, they returned strongly the following year, where they not only promoted back into Series 2, but also won a Jutland championship in the series. In the following years, KFUM's place in Series 2 was consolidated under head coach Lars Rasmussen, another 'player turned coach' from within the club, after Baltzer had stepped down from the head coaching position in 1986.

One of key players of the decade was Kim Bejder who had arrived from Ikast FS where he had played in the 1. Division, the highest level of Danish football. Furthermore, the team mainly consisted of players from the Silkeborg KFUM's youth academy during this period. These were brothers Poul and Jens Trier and Ole and Michael Vestergaard, Carsten Røjkjær and Per Sønderbæk, who had been through the ranks of Silkeborg KFUM. This invariably had created sense of togetherness which, added with players such as Flemming and Per Møldrup, who had both played for KFUM and at a higher level for Silkeborg IF, proved to be a particularly efficient recipe for success for the first team during these years.

=== Represented in the Superliga and renewed optimism (2000–2015) ===
After having played as a youth player for Silkeborg KFUM and a further four years as a senior player, Thomas Olsen was signed by Silkeborg IF in December 2002. With Viggo Jensen as their head coach, Silkeborg IF competed in the Danish Superliga. Olsen quickly established himself in the starting lineup of Jensen, and when he left Silkeborg IF in 2009, he had made an impressive 126 appearances for the club. Afterwards, Olsen returned to his roots in Silkeborg KFUM, where he became a central figure both on and off the field having made 269 appearances for the KFUM first team, 4th most in club history.

The Silkeborg KFUM first team competed in the Jutland Series, the highest division of DBU Jutland and the fifth highest national division, in the first half of the 2000s. In the years after, however, club's best senior team only competed in Series 1, the sixth national level, as its best result. By 2015, the ambition was to become a regular side in the Jutland Series.

=== Promotions and Denmark Series (2015–2021) ===
In July 2016, ahead of the 2016 Series 1 season, Silkeborg KFUM hired former Denmark international Christopher Poulsen, who had formerly played for FC Midtjylland, Silkeborg IF and Viborg FF, as a player-assistant to join the first-team staff to support head coach Lars Dahl. After a strong showing during the autumn, the team reached promotion to the Jutland Series 2 on 9 October 2016 with four games left to play after a 4–0 win over Kvik/Aalestrup IF. The last match of the season, an 8–0 win over Silkeborg Kammeraternes Sportsklub (SKS), solidified KFUM's lead in Group 6 of the Series 1, ending in first place with 37 points in 14 matches.

Ahead of the 2017 Jutland Series 2 season, Silkeborg KFUM was placed in Group 4 consisting of clubs from Aarhus as well as South Jutland. The club also hired some prominent names to their staff: Ove Christensen, a successful Danish Superliga coach, was hired as director of football/consultant, while Jesper Thygesen, whose career in the highest Danish division spanned more than a decade, was hired as the new forwards coach. At the same time, Denmark national futsal team player, Jannik Mehlsen, was signed to the team. He came with experience from the Danish 2nd Division, the third highest tier. Shortly before the start of the competition, Christiansfeld IF withdrew their team due to lacking players, which meant that only seven teams were competing in Group 4 and Christiansfeld had taken one of the relegation spots. On 1 April 2017, Silkeborg KFUM played their first match in the Jutland Series after promotion, winning 1–0 over Fuglebakken KFUM after a second-half goal by Christian Pedersen.

In October 2017, head coach Lars Dahl left the position after reaching qualification for the Denmark Series by drawing 1–1 against DGL 2000.

=== 3rd Division as Young Boys FD ===
On 19 June 2021, Silkeborg KFUM secured promotion to the newly created Danish 3rd Division, after competitors Marienlyst lost 3–1 to Vejgaard BK.

Silkeborg KFUM announced on 14 July 2021 that the club would be renamed Young Boys FD and would introduce professional contracts to their first team.

In May 2023, Young Boys FD announced 29-year-old Daniel Hørlyk Sehested as their new head coach, succeeding Thomas Loft and becoming the youngest head coach in the Danish divisions.

== Management ==
Position	Name
Head coach	Daniel Hørlyk Sehested
Assistant coach	Simon Sørensen
