= Middelfart Stadium =

Football stadium in Middelfart, Denmark

- Interactive map of Middelfart Stadium
- Location: Adlerhusvej 3, 5500 Middelfart
- Coordinates: 55°30′14″N 9°42′54″E
- Owner: Middelfart Boldklub
- Capacity: 4,000

Tenant
- Middelfart Boldklub

Middelfart Stadium (Danish: Middelfart Stadion) is a football stadium in Middelfart, Denmark. It is the home ground of Middelfart BK and has a capacity of 4,000.

== See also ==
- List of football stadiums in Denmark
