= IF Lyseng Fodbold =

Danish football club

IF Lyseng
- Full name: Idrætsforeningen Lyseng Fodbold
- Nicknames: De orange ræve (The Orange Foxes)
- Founded: 18 June 1970; 56 years ago
- Ground: Lyseng Idrætscenter, Højbjerg, Aarhus Municipality, Denmark
- Chairman: Gitte Vase
- Head coach: Jacob Serwin
- League: Denmark Series
- 2025–26: Danish 3rd Division, 12th of 12 (relegated)
- Website: www.lyseng.dk
Home colours	Away colours

Idrætsforeningen Lyseng Fodbold (Danish pronunciation: [ˈlyseŋˀ]), commonly known as IF Lyseng, is an association football club based in the suburb of Højbjerg, Aarhus Municipality, Denmark, that competes in the Denmark Series, the fifth tier of the Danish football league system. The club's name comes from its home ground, which is located on the former land of Lysenggård, a farm in Højbjerg. The football department is the most notable one of Idrætsforeningen Lyseng, a major multi-sport club who compete in football, handball, volleyball, swimming and beach volleyball, among others.

Founded in 1970 as a merger of Skåde Boldklub and Kragelund Idrætsforening, the club is known for their iconic orange team colour, which was initially chosen as a compromise, as its parents clubs wore red and green, respectively. IF Lyseng is affiliated to DBU Jutland, the regional football association. The team plays its home matches at Lyseng Idrætscenter, where it has been based since 1975. The club spent most of its history in the lower regional tiers of Danish football, but reached promotion to the Danish 2nd Division, the third tier, for the first time in its history ahead of the 2017–18 season.

IF Lyseng has 1,200 paying members, making it one of the largest sports clubs in Jutland and Denmark as a whole.

== History ==
=== Beginnings and merger ===
The roots of IF Lyseng go back to 1922. In Skåde, on the lands of estate owner Valdemar Rasmussen, a group of pupils attending Skåde Skole began playing association football after school. At first, this was mostly random kicking to a leather laced ball but soon an organised club was established, "Skåde Boldklub", and a board was elected. Later, the team was allowed to use the pitch at Skåde Skole, popularly called the "hen house" (or "Hønsehuset" in Danish). Football quickly grew in popularity, and youths formerly of the athletics department began playing football instead. In 1936, an association football pitch with a clubhouse (today the Marselisborg Hockey Club) was constructed next to Hotel Kragelund. The board of Skåde Boldklub immediately applied for a relocation to this ground, which was accepted under the conditions that a name change occurred, and Skåde Boldklub therefore changed its name to Kragelund Idrætsforening (Kragelund IF). For two decades, the small Kragelund Stadium, surrounded by tall trees, was the setting the activities of Kragelund IF, until the parish of Holme-Tranbjerg bought six acres of land from Lysenggård Farm in 1955, on which two association football pitches and two handball courts were constructed on the exact area where Lyseng Idrætscenter is located today. At the same time, a new clubhouse was erected in the area; a wooden house which had previously functioned as a restaurant during the summers at Moesgård Beach.

In Holme, however, a club had also formed. At "the meadow" (or "Engen" in Danish), by Holme Skole, students had been playing football for decades, and a sports club was finally founded on 1 April 1953 named Holme Idrætsforening (Holme IF). Holme IF and Kragelund IF quickly became local rivals.

Following the Municipal Reform of 1970, many changes were implemented for sports in the area. At the executive level, the two clubs held multiple meetings on the subject of merging. These discussions resulted in a decision to merge, which was decided at a general executive meeting on 18 June 1970. Thus, Holme's red uniforms and Kragelund's green uniforms were, after having reached a compromise, replaced with an iconic orange colour. Then, the old "dance restaurant" at Moesgård Beach was transformed into Lyseng Idrætspark, where the club had its first home ground. In the mid-1970s, there were talks about the clubhouse not being to date, and negotiations were initiated with the municipality on the construction of a new clubhouse. However, a fire in 1978 caused the clubhouse to burn down. Therefore, negotiations on building a new clubhouse were moved forward, and in the intervening period, outdoor locker room facilities at Lyseng Swimming Pool were used as an emergency solution.

In 1980, IF Lyseng initiated its new clubhouse, one of the most modern in Aarhus at the time.

=== Recent years ===
IF Lyseng spent most of its history in the lower regional tiers of Danish football, but surprisingly reached promotion to the Danish 2nd Division, the third tier, for the first time in its history ahead of the 2017–18 season. This feat was achieved under head coach Mick Andresen, who had coached the first team since 2011, where Lyseng was placed in the bottom of the Jutland Series, the fifth tier of Danish football. Before his tenure as a manager, he had a short career as a footballer for AGF, the major club in the city.

The club made its first appearance in the third tier on 6 August 2017 in the home opener against Jammerbugt FC, which ended in a 1–2 loss. Issa Kharoub scored Lyseng's first goal ever in the division, a penalty kick in the 61st minute. The following week, however, the club achieved its first victory with a win in the local matchup against VSK Aarhus, bringing three points home to Højbjerg after a 1–2 win at Vejlby Stadion. In the autumn, Lyseng finished 7th out of 8 in Group 3, with only Odder IGF having a worse record – partly due to Odder being deducted six points for paying salaries to amateur players. Therefore, the club competed in the relegation group during the spring of 2018, where they did not win a single game and thus suffered relegation to the Denmark Series after only one season at the third level.

Before relegation became a fact, head coach Andresen had agreed to step down from the position. John Andersen was appointed as his replacement on 21 May 2018, with Johnny Jungquist becoming his assistant.

IF Lyseng lost a 3-1 away match against BK Frem on 16 May 2026, confirming Lyseng's relegation to the Denmark Series after 4 years as a division club.
