= Denmark Series =

Association football league in Denmark

- Organising body: DBU
- Founded: 1965
- First season: 1966
- Country: Denmark
- Confederation: UEFA
- Divisions: 4
- Number of clubs: 40
- Level on pyramid: 5
- Promotion to: 3rd Division
- Relegation to: Copenhagen Series; Funen Series; Jutland Series; Zealand Series
- Domestic cup: Danish Cup
- Current champions: Ringsted IF, Holstebro, ASA Aarhus (2025–26)
- Current: 2026–27 Denmark Series

The Denmark Series (Danish: Danmarksserien, abbreviated DS) is the fifth tier of the Danish football league system and the highest level of amateur football for men in Denmark. It is administered by the tournament committee of the Danish Football Association (DBU) and is contested by 40 clubs in four regionally allocated groups of ten.

The competition was established in 1965 and first played in 1966, replacing the Qualification Tournament (Danish: Kvalifikationsturneringen), colloquially known as the fourth division, which had been contested since 1946. It began as the fourth tier of the Danish pyramid, was briefly the fifth between 1998 and 2000, and has been the fifth again since the 3rd Division was created in 2021. Alongside first teams it admits the reserve sides of clubs in the Superliga, the 1st Division and the 2nd Division, a provision that distinguished it from its predecessor and that at its height accounted for almost half the participating teams.

From its foundation until 2000–01 the group winners contested a knockout play-off for a national Denmark Series championship, the winner receiving a challenge trophy put up by the DBU. Vejle's reserve side won the first edition in 1966 and Næsby the last in 2001, after which the overall title was discontinued.

== History ==
=== Qualification Tournament (1946–65) ===
After the German occupation ended, travel conditions for clubs gradually normalised and the DBU resumed the Danish football championship from 1945–46 with three nationwide divisions. The Qualification Cup (Danish: Kvalifikations-Cupturneringen was introduced in 1946, in which the winners of the regional associations' top competitions played for promotion to the following season's 3rd Division. The first editions were played on a cup basis over three rounds, before a single round-robin of six matches between seven regional winners was adopted in 1950–51.

From 1959 the tournament, popularly called the fourth division, was expanded to twelve clubs playing 22 matches across a full calendar year. It comprised two clubs relegated from the 3rd Division, three retained from the previous season and the seven best-placed sides from the regional associations. The two leading clubs went up automatically, the seven lowest returned to their regional competitions and the remaining three stayed on. It was played for the last time in 1965, when a restructuring of the fourth level abolished it in favour of the new Denmark Series.

=== Establishment (1966) ===
The new calendar-year competition began in 1966 with four groups of twelve clubs playing 22 matches each, from spring to autumn within the same year. The groups were allocated on geographical criteria by the DBU and placed between the 3rd Division and the regional series administered by the DBU's local associations.

Accommodating so many participating clubs required relegation from both the 3rd Division and the Qualification Tournament to be suspended. The seven lowest-placed clubs in the 1965 Qualification Tournament qualified automatically for the inaugural season and the remaining 41 were drawn up from the regional associations' top competitions. Six clubs were taken from the Zealand Series, and a comparable number from each of the other associations, which in turn meant that relegation from the regional series was suspended for 1965.

Unlike the Qualification Tournament, the Denmark Series admitted from the outset the reserve sides of clubs in the national divisions, which had previously been unable to win promotion out of the regional leagues. Nineteen reserve teams took part in the first season and three of the four groups were won by one. At a meeting of the Denmark Series committee on 19 November 1966 it was agreed to standardise the rules across all four groups, so that from the second season the differing regional provisions on moving players between a club's first and reserve teams no longer applied.

=== The Denmark Series championship ===
Each group winner qualified automatically for a play-off, in which two semi-finals decided the participants in a final for the Danish championship for Denmark Series clubs. Semi-finals were normally scheduled for the two weeks immediately after the season ended. The late point in the year brought a heightened risk of snow, and several ties were postponed by up to a number of weeks. Finals were played at the ground of one of the two clubs, without regard to home advantage.

The winner received a challenge trophy put up by the DBU, which could not be won outright, and gained the right to style itself winner of the Denmark Series for men. All play-off participants received seventeen sets of the DBU's Denmark Series medals. The title was discontinued after the 2000–01 play-off.

=== Changes of format ===
The four groups of twelve held until 1986, when group sizes varied between twelve and fourteen, and from 1987 all four groups contained fourteen clubs playing 26 matches. Groups were enlarged again to sixteen clubs and 30 matches in 1991.

The transition to an autumn-to-spring calendar was made in two stages. A half-season was played in spring 1995, in which no championship was decided; because reserve teams could not go up, the four promotion places went to Lillerød IF, Roskilde B 1906, Nykøbing Falster Alliancen and Aarhus Fremad rather than to all four group winners. A second half-season was played in spring 2000, after which the competition ran from August to May with a winter break of around five months.

Between the spring of 1998 and the spring of 2000 the Denmark Series was the fifth tier rather than the fourth, following the introduction of the Qualification League between the divisions and the regional series. It returned to the fourth level thereafter.

The number of groups then fluctuated for two decades. It fell to three of sixteen clubs in 2000–01, to two in 2005–06, returned to three of fourteen in 2008–09, and was set at four groups of ten from 2016–17, the structure still in use.

The share of reserve teams declined sharply over the same period. They made up 48% of the field in 1986 and 46.9% as late as 2007–08, but only 7.1% by 2014–15. Among the more unusual cases, KB was compulsorily relegated into the 1992 Denmark Series by the DBU after the first half of the 1991 1st Division season, as a consequence of the elite partnership being formed with B 1903; it became formally the reserve side of Copenhagen only when that partnership was established on 1 July 1992.

=== Since 2021 ===
The creation of the 3rd Division in 2021–22 moved the Denmark Series down to the fifth tier. Four clubs went up in the first season under the new arrangement, and from the following season the DBU settled on three promoted and three relegated between the two levels.

The 2020–21 season was played to a one-off structure of four groups of eleven. The top four clubs in groups 1 and 2 contested a play-off for a place in the 2021–22 Danish 2nd Division, as did those in groups 3 and 4, producing one promoted club from the eastern groups and one from the western. Clubs placed fifth to eleventh were gathered into two groups of fourteen in which they met the clubs from the opposite group once, carrying their points and goals with them. Sixteen clubs were relegated, distributed according to the geographical origin of the eight clubs relegated from the 2nd Division.

== Format ==
The 40 clubs play a regular season in four groups of ten. The five best-placed clubs in each group then enter a promotion round, those from groups 1 and 2 forming an eastern group and those from groups 3 and 4 a western one. Clubs carry their points, goals and any disciplinary points across from the regular season.

The best-placed promotion-eligible club in each promotion group goes up to the 3rd Division. The second-best-placed eligible club in each plays the other over two legs for the third and final place, decided under UEFA competition rules. Reserve teams may not be promoted to a point within two levels of their first team, so the place passes down the table where necessary.

The remaining clubs contest a relegation round. The number relegated to the Copenhagen Series, Zealand Series, Lolland-Falster Series, Funen Series or Jutland Series varies from season to season, depending on how many clubs come down from the 3rd Division and on where those clubs are based, and each club drops into the competition of the regional association it belongs to.

Clubs in the Denmark Series enter the Danish Cup.

== Champions and group winners ==
=== 1966 to 2020–21 ===
Reserve teams are marked II. The championship play-off was contested from 1966 to 2000–01 only.

Season	Champions	Group 1	Group 2	Group 3	Group 4	Ref
1966	Vejle II	BK Rødovre	KB II	Esbjerg fB II	Vejle II	
1967	KB II	BK Hero	KB II	Aabenraa BK	AaB II	
1968	KB II	Rønne IK	KB II	Svendborg fB	Esbjerg fB II	
1969	Not recorded (Note: Sources record a final between KB and Herfølge BK but do not give the result.)	Kastrup	Herfølge	Vejen SF	AaB II	
1970	Holstebro	Brønshøj II	Kalundborg GF&BK	B.1901 II (Note: The match between Nakskov BK and B.1901 was postponed. B.1901 is reported to have won the rearranged fixture, taken the group and qualified for the semi-finals.)	Holstebro	
1971	IF 32 Glostrup	B.93 II	IF 32 Glostrup	Vejle II	AGF II	
1972	Glostrup IC	BK Dalgas	Glostrup IC	Vejle II	Hjørring IF	
1973	Ballerup IF	BK Hero	Ballerup IF	Maribo BK (Note: Kolding IF originally won the group, but a protest lodged by Maribo BK over its defeat to Vejle II concerning an ineligible player was upheld by the Funen Football Association, and Maribo took the group and the promotion place instead.)	Viborg FF	
1974	Kolding IF	Fremad Amager II	Brøndby	Kolding IF	IK Skovbakken	
1975	Vejle II	BK Rødovre	Roskilde B 1906	Vejle II	AIA-Tranbjerg	
1976	Vejle II	Fremad Amager II	IF 32 Glostrup	Kolding IF	Vejle II	
1977	Jyderup SG&IF	B 1903 II	Jyderup SG&IF	Skamby BK	Vejle II	
1978	Nørresundby	Fremad Valby	Ballerup IF	Odense KFUM	Nørresundby	
1979	OB II	BK Hero	Hvidovre IF II	OB II	Hjørring IF	
1980	Horsens fS	Brønshøj II	IF Skjold Birkerød	Aabenraa BK	Horsens fS	
1981	B 1903 II	B 1903 II	Lyngby II	Esbjerg fB II	Hjørring IF	
1982	B 1913	Brønshøj II	Skovlunde IF	B 1913	Silkeborg	
1983	AGF II	B 1908	Greve	Næsby	AGF II	
1984	Ikast FS II	B.93 II	Brøndby II	Vordingborg IF	Ikast FS II	
1985	AGF II	B.93 II	Brøndby II	Odense KFUM	AGF II	
1986	Albertslund IF	Brønshøj II	Albertslund IF	Vejle II	Silkeborg II	
1987	AGF II	Skovshoved IF	Lyngby II	Vejle II	AGF II	
1988	B 1903 II	B 1903 II	KB II	OB II	Asaa BK	
1989	B 1903 II	Lyngby II	B 1903 II	B 1909 II	Holstebro	
1990	BK Frem II	Hellerup IK	BK Frem II	Vejle II	Silkeborg II	
1991	BK Frem II	Hvidovre IF	BK Frem II	FC Fredericia	AaB II	
1992	Silkeborg II	Skovshoved IF	BK Frem II	Haderslev FK	Silkeborg II	
1993	IF 32 Glostrup	IF 32 Glostrup	Brøndby II	Varde IF	Silkeborg II	
1994	Brøndby II	Skovshoved IF	Brøndby II	B 1909	Silkeborg II	
spring 1995	Not contested (Note: The spring 1995 half-season formed part of the transition to a new competition structure. No championship was decided, and the promotion places went to Lillerød IF, Roskilde B 1906, Nykøbing Falster Alliancen and Aarhus Fremad, reserve teams being ineligible.)	Lillerød IF	Roskilde B 1906	Vejle II	Ikast FS II	
autumn 1995	Brøndby II	B 1908	Brøndby II	Vejle II	AGF II	
1996	Brøndby II	Skovshoved IF	Brøndby II	Vejle II	AaB II	
1997	Brøndby II	Herlev IF	Brøndby II	Næsby	Ikast FS II	
1998	IF Skjold Birkerød	IF Skjold Birkerød	Brøndby II	Kolding IF	Silkeborg II	
1999	Lyngby II	Virum-Sorgenfri BK	Lyngby II	Korup IF	Frederikshavn fI	
spring 2000	Ikast FS II	Brøndby II	KB II	Vejle II	Ikast FS II	
2000–01	Næsby	BK Skjold	Kalundborg GF&BK	Næsby	None	
2001–02	Discontinued	Nykøbing Falster Alliancen	Slagelse BK&IF	Silkeborg II	None	
2002–03		Lyngby	Esbjerg fB II	Brabrand IF	None	
2003–04		Værløse BK	Esbjerg fB II	Silkeborg II	None	
2004–05		KB II	Brøndby II	Silkeborg II	None	
2005–06		Greve	Skive	None	None	
2006–07		Vanløse	AaB II	None	None	
2007–08		Avarta	Randers Freja	None	None	
2008–09		B 1908	Otterup B&IK	Silkeborg II	None	
2009–10		Elite 3000	Middelfart G&BK	Horsens fS II	None	
2010–11		IF Skjold Birkerød	Marienlyst	Kjellerup	None	
2011–12		BK Frem	Middelfart G&BK	FC Skanderborg	None	
2012–13		B.93	SC Egedal	Kolding IF	None	
2013–14		Avedøre IF	Kolding IF	Kjellerup	None	
2014–15		AB Tårnby	Dalum IF	Aarhus Fremad	None	
2015–16		Fredensborg BI	FC Sydvest	Kjellerup	None	
2016–17		Hillerød	Skovshoved	Ringkøbing	Lyseng	
2017–18		Slagelse B&I	Vanløse	Tarup-Paarup	Vejgaard	
2018–19		Holbæk B&I	FA 2000	Næsby	VSK Aarhus	
2019–20		Holstebro	Roskilde KFUM	SfB-Oure FA	AB Tårnby	
2020–21		Karlslunde IF	Herlev IF	Marienlyst	Lyseng	

=== Promoted clubs since 2021–22 ===
The introduction of promotion and relegation rounds from 2021–22 means the competition no longer produces group winners in the earlier sense.

Season	Promoted to the 3rd Division	Ref
2021–22	AB Tårnby, Ishøj, SfB-Oure FA, Holstebro	
2022–23	Holbæk B&I, Vejgaard, Avarta (Note: The 2022–23 season included an intermediate round in which the groups were redrawn into five new groups after the regular season, followed by a final round.)	
2023–24	Brønshøj, Sundby, Odder IGF	
2024–25	Hørsholm-Usserød, Vanløse, Vejgaard	
2025–26	Ringsted, Holstebro, ASA Aarhus	
