= Holstebro Idrætspark =

Football stadium in Holstebro, Denmark

- Interactive map of Holstebro Idrætspark
- Location: Rolf Krakesvej 9, DK-7500 Holstebro, Denmark
- Coordinates: 56°21′57″N 8°37′51.10″E
- Owner: Holstebro Municipality
- Operator: Holstebro Boldklub
- Capacity: 8,000
- Surface: Grass
- Record attendance: 6,700 (vs. Herning Fremad, 1971)
- Field size: 105 by 68 metres (114.8 yd × 74.4 yd)

Holstebro Idrætspark is a multi-use stadium in Holstebro, Denmark. It is currently used mostly for association football matches and is the home stadium of Holstebro Boldklub. The stadium holds 8,000 people.
