= Danish 3rd Division =

Danmarksturneringens 3. division
- Organising body: Divisionsforeningen
- Founded: 2021; 5 years ago
- First season: 2021–22
- Country: Denmark
- Confederation: UEFA
- Divisions: 1
- Number of clubs: 12
- Level on pyramid: 4
- Promotion to: 2nd Division
- Relegation to: Denmark Series
- Domestic cup: Danish Cup
- Current champions: Nykøbing FC (2025–26)
- Broadcaster: JFM (2022–present)
- Website: 3-division.dk
- Current: 2026–27 Danish 3rd Division

The 3rd Division (Danish: 3. division), also known as CampoBet 3. Division for sponsorship reasons, is the fourth tier of the Danish football league system since the 2021–22 season. It is the semi-professional association football league for men. It is organised by the Divisionsforeningen on behalf of the Danish Football Association (DBU) as part of the nationwide football competitions and is positioned between the third-tier 2nd Division and the fifth-tier Denmark Series in the league pyramid.

== History ==
In 2020, the Danish Football Association announced the creation of one new division, which would split the existing third tier 2nd Division in two, creating a new fourth tier: the 3rd Division. Therefore, it replaced the Denmark Series as the fourth tier, which instead became the new fifth tier.

== League format ==
The 3rd Division is made up of a total of 12 clubs. After 22 rounds the group will be split in a promotion group and a relegation group. The top two teams of the promotion group will be promoted to the Danish 2nd Division, while the bottom four in the relegation group are relegated to the Denmark Series.

== Sponsors and logos ==
The fourth-tier was given its own logo from its debut, taking effect at the start of the 2021–22 season. In June 2025, Soft2Bet, the operator of CampoBet and Betinia, chose to become the title sponsor of the second, third, and fourth divisions starting from the 2025/26 season and for at least two seasons.

== Winners ==
Season	Winners	Runners-up	Top scorer(s)		Ref
Season	Winners	Runners-up	Name	Goals	Ref
2021–22	FC Roskilde	BK Frem	Valdemar Schousboe (FC Roskilde)	28	
2022–23	Middelfart Fodbold	Frederiksberg Alliancen 2000	Daniel Stückler (Ishøj IF)	22	
2023–24	BK Frem	Ishøj IF	Egzon Zeqiri (BK Frem)	19	
2024–25	Brabrand IF	VSK Aarhus	Jonas Yderholm (VSK Aarhus)	18	
2025–26	Nykøbing FC	FA 2000	Emmanuel Ogude (Nykøbing FC)	19	
