= Middelfart Boldklub =

Association football club in Middelfart, Denmark

- Full name: Middelfart Boldklub
- Founded: 25 May 1900; 126 years ago, as Middelfart G&IK; 1948; 78 years ago, as Middelfart G&BK; 2015; 11 years ago, as Middelfart Boldklub
- Ground: Middelfart Stadion
- Capacity: 4,100
- Chairman: Per Jørgensen
- Manager: Kristoffer Johannsen
- League: Danish 2nd Division
- 2025–26: Danish 1st Division, 12th of 12 (relegated)
- Website: https://middelfartboldklub.dk/
Home colours	Away colours

Middelfart Boldklub is a Danish football club which plays in the Danish 2nd Division, the third tier of Danish football. They play at Middelfart Stadion in Middelfart, which has a capacity of 4,100.

== History ==
Middelfart Gymnastik & Idræts Klub (MG&IK) was founded on 25 May 1900 and, shortly after the end of World War II, it merged with its local neighbours from Middelfart Boldklub. Since 2015, the football department of Middelfart G&BK has been organised under the name Middelfart Boldklub ApS with the aim of transitioning into a professional football club, whereas the amateur section has continued under the name Middelfart G&BK. Middelfart Boldklub therefore has the license to the divisional team (third highest level of Danish football) and leases the Middelfart G&BK facility. Thereby, Middelfart Boldklub also has access to the pitches and clubhouse and uses the stadium, Middelfart Stadion at Adlerhusvej, where there are also changing rooms and public facilities.

On 21 November 2015, Middelfart Boldklub signed its first professional player, Oluwafemi Ajilore after the Danish Football Union (DBU) has approved the club as an Anpartsselskab ("private company limited by shares").

== Honours ==
- Danish 3rd Division
  - Champions: 2022–23

== Players ==
=== Current squad ===
As of 6 September 2026

Note: Flags indicate national team as defined under FIFA eligibility rules; some limited exceptions apply. Players may hold more than one non-FIFA nationality.

No.	Pos.	Nation	Player
1	GK	DEN	Tobias Haahr
2	DF	GER	Peter Matiebel
3	DF	DEN	Malthe Kristensen
4	DF	DEN	Jacob Vetter
5	DF	DEN	Mikkel Juul
6	MF	UGA	Robert Kakeeto
7	MF	DEN	Frederik Møller
8	MF	DEN	Matthias Præst
9	FW	KOS	Rinor Rexhepi
10	FW	FRA	Aaron Akalé
11	MF	DEN	Jonas Villemoes
12	DF	DEN	Lasse Thomsen
14	MF	DEN	Noah Barholt

No.	Pos.	Nation	Player
15	FW	DEN	Mikkel Søfeldt
16	GK	DEN	Niklas Banck-Skødt
18	MF	NED	Jerailly Wielzen
19	FW	DEN	Mathias Bang
20	MF	DEN	Rasmus Koch
21	MF	DEN	Hjalte Hemmingsen
22	DF	DEN	Christian Boyum
25	MF	DEN	Nicolai Bossen
28	DF	DEN	Victor Laursen
39	FW	GER	Lasse Wehmeyer
77	DF	DEN	Alberto Vogtmann
88	GK	DEN	William Nyborg
