= Ishøj IF =

Danish football club

- Full name: Ishøj Idrætsforening
- Founded: 20 April 2017; 9 years ago
- Ground: Ishøj Idrætscenter, Ishøj, Denmark
- Chairman: Ahu Demir
- Manager: Vacant
- League: Danish 3rd Division
- 2025–26: Danish 2nd Division, 11th of 12 (relegated)
- Website: http://www.ishojif.dk/
Home colours

Ishøj Idrætsforening is a Danish semi‑professional football club based in Ishøj, part of the Capital Region of Denmark. The first team plays in the Danish 3rd Division, the fourth tier of the national league system, and hosts matches at Ishøj Idrætscenter.

The club was founded on 20 April 2017 through the merger of Ishøj Boldklub and SB 50 Ishøj, an initiative intended to consolidate the municipality's youth academies and create a clearer pathway to senior football. Ishøj IF started its existence in the Zealand Series in 2017. Less than three months after its formation Ishøj IF became an official feeder club for Nordsjælland, strengthening its player‑development pathway. The project has attracted several former Danish Superliga and international players—including Osama Akharraz, Nicki Bille Nielsen, Nabil Dirar and Adnan Mohammad—who have added experience to the young squad.

== Players ==
As of 10 September 2026

Note: Flags indicate national team as defined under FIFA eligibility rules; some limited exceptions apply. Players may hold more than one non-FIFA nationality.

No.	Pos.	Nation	Player
1	GK	FRO	Marius Kruse
2	DF	DEN	Victor Enggaard
3	DF	DEN	Mathias Moestrup
4	DF	DEN	Sebastian Kristensen
5	MF	DEN	Bilal Masaad
6	MF	DEN	Cornelius Kilpatrick
10	FW	DEN	Mohamed Azaquoun
11	FW	DEN	Sebastian Escobar
12	MF	DEN	Fredrik Munck
13	MF	DEN	Altay Berk
14	MF	DEN	Magnus Søndergaard
15	MF	TUR	Ertuğrul Tekşen
16	FW	DEN	Jagvir Singh
17	FW	DEN	Ismail Elaoufi
18	FW	DEN	Daniel Stückler

No.	Pos.	Nation	Player
19	DF	DEN	Rasmus Lynder
20	MF	DEN	Gabriel Vennemus
21	FW	DEN	Youcef Makdad
22	DF	DEN	Oskar Møller
23	MF	DEN	Victor Musse
24	FW	PAK	Ali Haider Shah
25	GK	PAK	Yousuf Butt
28	MF	DEN	Benjamin Göddert
31	MF	MKD	Arif Loki
45	DF	DEN	Mahdi Babaiasl
77	FW	DEN	William Maretti
-	GK	DEN	Valdemar Overby-Poulsen
-	DF	DEN	Andrew Oseni
-	MF	DEN	Engin Kanturovski
