= FA 2000 =

Association football club in Denmark

Coordinates: 55°40′33″N 12°29′51.5″E

- Full name: Frederiksberg Alliancen 2000
- Short name: FA 2000
- Founded: 7 September 2000; 26 years ago
- Ground: Frederiksberg Idrætspark, Frederiksberg
- Capacity: 5,000
- Chairman: Tommy Burmeister Madsen
- Head coach: João Fernandes
- League: Danish 2nd Division
- 2025–26: Danish 3rd Division, 2nd of 12 (promoted)
- Website: frederiksbergalliancen.dk
Home colours

Frederiksberg Alliancen 2000, commonly referred to as FA 2000, is a professional association football club based in the area of Frederiksberg, Capital Region, Denmark, that competes in the Danish 2nd Division, the third tier of the Danish football league system. Founded in 2000, it is affiliated to the regional association DBU Copenhagen. The team plays its home matches at Frederiksberg Idrætspark, where it has been based since its foundation.

The club was founded on 7 September 2000 as a merger between B 1972, Boldklubben Dalgas and Frederiksberg Kammeraternes IF. While B 1972 and Frederiksberg Kammeraterne were non-league clubs, Dalgas had previously competed one season in the third tier.

== History ==
FA 2000 was formed on 7 September 1999 through the merger of three local Frederiksberg clubs—Boldklubben Dalgas (founded 1922), B 1972, and Frederiksberg Kammeraternes Idrætsforening (founded 1930)—and began play in the Series 2 in the spring of 2000, winning promotion to Series 1 in its first season.

Over the following decade the club competed in the lower tiers of Copenhagen football under a succession of coaches, including the former Silkeborg IF player Torben Jørgensen and the former Copenhagen player Iørn Uldbjerg, without achieving promotion. In August 2009, FA 2000 reached the first round of the Danish Cup, losing 2–0 at home to Allerød FK of the Danish 2nd Division.

In June 2011, FA 2000 won promotion to the Copenhagen Series following a long unbeaten run. The following year, a 3–2 away win over Kastrup Boldklub in June 2012 secured promotion to the Denmark Series.

After relegation from the Denmark Series to the Copenhagen Series, FA 2000 won immediate promotion back, scoring 80 goals during the campaign. In 2018, the club reached the third-tier Danish 2nd Division for the first time in its history, having overcome the resignation of head coach Tim Ilsø two days before the promotion season began.

FA 2000 was relegated from the 2nd Division in 2022, but returned at the first attempt, an 87th-minute goal in a 1–0 home win over VSK Aarhus securing second place with a round to spare.

Relegated again in 2024, the club won promotion back to the 2nd Division under head coach Semere Haile in the 2025–26 season. Haile was dismissed within days of the promotion, and FA 2000 appointed João Fernandes as head coach for the 2026–27 season.

== Current squad ==
As of 6 September 2026

Note: Flags indicate national team as defined under FIFA eligibility rules; some limited exceptions apply. Players may hold more than one non-FIFA nationality.

No.	Pos.	Nation	Player
1	GK	DEN	Rasmus Wedege
2	DF	DEN	Daniel Amtrup
3	DF	DEN	William Ravn
4	DF	DEN	Christian Troelsen
5	DF	DEN	Valdemar Høgh
6	MF	DEN	Simon Holden
7	FW	DEN	Mican Atici
8	MF	DEN	Ruben Minerba
9	FW	NOR	Vegard Johanssen
10	MF	DEN	Louis Peña
11	FW	MKD	Donart Bedjeti
12	FW	DEN	Sander Lauesen
14	DF	DEN	Frederik Kongslev
15	DF	DEN	Jonathan Thorborg

No.	Pos.	Nation	Player
16	MF	DEN	Nikolaj Andonovski
17	MF	DEN	Lucas Lodberg
18	FW	DEN	Oscar Ryø
19	DF	DEN	Viktor Jensen
20	FW	DEN	Jaziel Kambale
21	DF	FRO	Elias Rusborg
22	MF	DEN	Tobias Sommer
23	FW	DEN	Hassan Elsayed
24	DF	DEN	Lukas Svensson
25	MF	DEN	Marcus Porsgrunn
27	DF	TUR	Erem Özkül
28	FW	DEN	Basem Alkhoudari
82	GK	DEN	Birk Boman
88	GK	DEN	Carl Alfred Maslen
