= List of Danish football transfers winter 2009–10 =

This is a list of Danish football transfers for the 2009–10 winter transfer window. Only moves featuring at least one Danish Superliga club are listed.

The winter break of the Danish Superliga 2009–10 season was from 7 December 2009 to 6 March 2010. The winter transfer window opened on 1 January 2010, although a few transfers took place prior to that date; carry-overs from the summer 2009 transfer window. The window closed at midnight on 1 February 2010.

== Transfers ==
Date	Name	Nat	Moving from	Moving to	Fee
2009-07-06^{1}	Yura Movsisyan	ARM	(United States) MLS (Real Salt Lake)^{2}	Randers FC	Free
2009-08-31^{1}	Stephan Petersen	DEN	Nordsjælland	AGF	Free
2009-09-02^{1}	Chris Rolfe	USA	(United States) MLS (Chicago Fire)^{2}	AaB	Free
2009-11-04	Filip Marčić	CRO	Midtjylland	Unattached	Released
2009-11-06^{1}	Anders Egholm	DEN	SønderjyskE	Randers	Free
2009-11-12	Tobias Grahn	SWE	Randers	Unattached	Released
2009-11-13^{1}	Alexander Lund Hansen	NOR	(Norway) Rosenborg	OB	Undisclosed
2009-11-19^{1}	Kristian Lassen	DEN	AGF	Aarhus Fremad	Free
2009-12-02^{1}	Nicolai Boilesen	DEN	Brøndby	(Netherlands) Ajax	Free
2009-12-03^{1}	Danny Califf	USA	Midtjylland	(United States) MLS (Philadelphia Union)^{2}	Undisclosed
2009-12-06^{1}	Olafur Skulason	ISL	Helsingborg	SønderjyskE	Free
2009-12-07^{1}	Thomas Gaardsøe	DEN	AaB	Esbjerg	Free
2009-12-08^{1}	Matti Lund Nielsen	DEN	OB	Nordsjælland	Free
2009-12-08^{1}	Lasse Heinze	DEN	Midtjylland	Silkeborg	Undisclosed
2009-12-09^{1}	Christopher Poulsen	DEN	Midtjylland	Silkeborg	Undisclosed
2009-12-11^{1}	Sekou Oliseh	NGR	Midtjylland	(Russia) CSKA Moscow	Undisclosed
2009-12-15^{1}	Patrick Mortensen	DEN	Brøndby	Lyngby	Undisclosed
2009-12-16^{1}	Gunnar Thorvaldsson	ISL	Esbjerg	(England) Reading	Loan
2009-12-17^{1}	Thomas Nørgaard	DEN	Silkeborg	Skive	Free
2009-12-21^{1}	Jeremiah White	USA	AGF	Unattached	Released
2009-12-29^{1}	Sune Gundersen	DEN	Esbjerg	Hjørring	Free
2010-01-01	Claus Madsen	DEN	Midtjylland	Retirement	Out of contract
2010-01-01	Lars Pleidrup	DEN	AGF	Vestsjælland	Free
2010-01-01	Joseph Elanga	CMR	Brøndby	Unattached	Out of contract
2010-01-01	Jacob Berthelsen	DEN	AB	Brøndby	Loan return
2010-01-01	Nicolaj Agger	DEN	SønderjyskE	Brøndby	Loan return
2010-01-01	Daniel Wass	DEN	(Norway) Fredrikstad	Brøndby	Loan return
2010-01-01	Nicklas Jensen	DEN	FCK	Retirement	Out of contract
2010-01-01	Simon Richter	DEN	Nordsjælland	Unattached	Out of contract
2010-01-01	Andreas Granskov	DEN	AB	Nordsjælland	Loan return
2010-01-01	Esben Hansen	DEN	Randers	OB	Loan return
2010-01-01	Kenneth Møller Pedersen	DEN	Randers	Unattached	Out of contract
2010-01-01	José Júnior	BRA	FCK	Unattached	Released
2010-01-01	Rune Nilssen	NOR	FCK	(Norway) Start	Loan return
2010-01-01	Thomas Villadsen	DEN	Nordsjælland	Unattached	Out of contract
2010-01-01	Rene Belling	DEN	HB Køge	Unattached	Out of contract
2010-01-01	Rune Pedersen	DEN	OB	Lyngby	Loan return
2010-01-01	Allan K. Jepsen	DEN	Randers	Unattached	Out of contract
2010-01-01	Steven Lustü	DEN	Silkeborg	Retirement	Out of contract
2010-01-06	David Williams	AUS	Brøndby	(Australia) North Queensland Fury	Undisclosed
2010-01-06	Quincy Antipas	ZIM	Blokhus	HB Køge	Undisclosed
2010-01-08	Kristian Flittie Onstad	NOR	Esbjerg	Unattached	Released
2010-01-10	Nando Rafael	ANG	AGF	(Germany) FC Augsburg	Loan
2010-01-11	Michael Lumb	DEN	AGF	(Russia) Zenit Saint Petersburg	Undisclosed
2010-01-13	Arkadiusz Onyszko	POL	Midtjylland	Unattached	Released
2010-01-13	Libor Sionko	CZE	FCK	Unattached	Released
2010-01-14	Dario Dumic	DEN	(England) Norwich	Brøndby	Free
2010-01-16	Adrian Cann	CAN	Esbjerg	Unattached	Released
2010-01-18	Remco van der Schaaf	NLD	(England) Burnley	Brøndby	Loan
2010-01-21	Sedin Alic	BIH	SønderjyskE	Vejle	Free
2010-01-22	Niels Kristensen	DEN	AGF	Retirement	End of contract
2010-01-23	Dennis Cagara	DEN	Nordsjælland	AGF	Free
2010-01-25	Alexander Östlund	SWE	Esbjerg	Unattached	Released
2010-01-26	Morten Rasmussen	DEN	Brøndby	(Scotland) Celtic	Undisclosed
2010-01-28	Anders Simonsen	DEN	HB Køge	Roskilde	Free
2010-01-29	Sune Kiilerich	DEN	Midtjylland	(Italy) Sampdoria	Undisclosed
2010-01-29	Bryan Oviedo	CRC	(Costa Rica) Saprissa	FCK	Undisclosed
2010-01-29	Bobbie Friberg da Cruz	SWE	Randers	(Norway) Kongsvinger	Loan
2010-01-31	Yakubu Akilu	NGR	Midtjylland	Kolding	Undisclosed
2010-01-31	Morten Karlsen	DEN	Nordsjælland	Randers	Free
2010-02-01	Jesper Blicher	DEN	AGF	AB	Free
2010-02-01	Martin Jørgensen	DEN	(Italy) Fiorentina	AGF	Undisclosed
2010-02-01	Mark Leth Pedersen	DEN	Brøndby	HB Køge	Loan
2010-02-01	Pierre Kanstrup	DEN	Brøndby	Lyngby	Loan
2010-02-01	Sebastian Andersen	DEN	HB Køge	Esbjerg	Undisclosed
2010-02-01	Kim Christensen	DEN	Midtjylland	AB	Undisclosed
2010-02-01	Emil Ousager	DEN	OB	Næsby	Free
2010-02-01	Søren Jensen	DEN	(Norway) Odd Grenland	Randers	Loan
2010-02-01	David Addy	GHA	Randers	(Portugal) Porto	Undisclosed
2010-02-01	Jesper Jensen	DEN	SønderjyskE	Vejle	Loan
2010-02-04^{3}	Fredrik Björck	SWE	Esbjerg	(Norway) Tromsø	Undisclosed
2010-02-04	Morten Christensen	DEN		Esbjerg	Out of contract
2010-02-09	Bo Storm	DEN		HB Køge	Out of contract
2010-02-17^{4}	Ken Fagerberg	SWE	Midtjylland	(Sweden) Örgryte	Loan
2010-03-30^{3}	Stefan Gislason	ISL	Brøndby	(Norway) Viking	Loan

== Notes ==
- ^1 The player officially joined his new club on 1 January 2010.
- ^2 In Major League Soccer, all player contracts are owned by the league, not by individual teams.
- ^3 The deal went through during the transfer window of the Norwegian Premier League.
- ^4 The deal went through during the transfer window of the Swedish Allsvenskan.
