= Jens Gjesing =

Danish footballer and manager (born 1986)

Personal information
- Full name: Jens Gjesing
- Date of birth: January 13, 1986 (age 40)
- Place of birth: Tilst, Denmark
- Height: 1.87 m (6 ft 2 in)
- Position: Midfielder

Team information
- Current team: Hobro IK (manager)

Youth career
- 1993–1997: Vejlby IK
- 1997–2004: AGF

Senior career*
Years	Team	Apps	(Gls)
2004–2012	AGF	127	(5)
2011–2012	→ Hobro (loan)	8	(0)
2012	Hobro	3	(0)
2015–2016	Fuglebakken KFUM		

International career
2006	Denmark U20	2	(0)
2007–2008	Denmark U21	14	(1)

Managerial career
- 2015–2016: Fuglebakken KFUM (player-assistant)
- 2017–2018: Aarhus Fremad II
- 2019–2025: VSK Aarhus
- 2025–: Hobro IK
- * Club domestic league appearances and goals

Jens Gjesing (Danish: [ˈjens ˈke̝ːse̝ŋ]; born 13 January 1986) is a Danish football manager and former player who manages Hobro IK in the Danish 1st Division, the second tier of the Danish football league system.

Gjesing mainly played for AGF during his active career for whom he made 137 appearances and scored nine goals. He was, however, injury-prone as a player, and retired in 2012 while representing Hobro IK, after failing to recover from successive cruciate ligament injuries. After his playing career, Gjesing has pursued a managerial career.

He was an established member of the Denmark under-21 team from 2007 to 2008, earning 14 caps in which he scored one goal. He was part of the team that reached the 2009 UEFA European Under-21 Championship qualification play-offs, which were lost over two legs to Serbia under-21.

== Club career ==
=== AGF ===
Gjesing started his career in the youth academy of lower division side Vejlby IK before moving to the AGF youth department in 1997 at age 10. In 2001, he was part of the AGF under-15 team winning gold at the unofficial European Youth Club Championship in Vienna, qualifying for the World Cup. Throughout his youth years, Gjesing was known as a prolific striker, before being utilised as a defender and finally at the position of midfielder, which he played later as a professional first-team player.

In October 2004, Gjesing signed his first professional contract with AGF, a one-and-a-half-year deal. At this point he had already been part of the first team for some months and appeared in pre-season friendlies. Gjesing made his official debut as an 18-year-old only a month after signing the contract, coming on as an 88th-minute substitute in a 4–0 away defeat in the Danish Superliga to future champions Brøndby IF on 21 November. During his first season as a member of the first team, he made two total appearances.

The following season, Gjesing featured more regularly in the first team, making 22 league appearances in which he scored two goals. In May 2006, towards the end of the 2005–06 season, he signed three-year contract extension which AGF sporting director Brian Steen Nielsen called "justified [...], he has a good potential and, not least, a tremendous will which can bring him far."

On 20 September 2006, during extra time of the Danish Cup third round matchup away against FC Roskilde, Gjesing scored the decisive 2–1 goal in the 120th minute to send AGF into the round of 32. He received a red card in a Danish 1st Division (second highest division) loss to Lyngby Boldklub on 22 April 2007 after elbowing an opponent, an action for which he was fiercely criticised following the match by head coach Ove Pedersen and team captain Peter Graulund, calling it "immature" and "inexcusable". Gjesing, however, excused his red card by saying that "to err is human" and that the situation was "a learning experience".

After AGF reached promotion to the Danish Superliga following a second-place finish in the 2006–07 Danish 1st Division, Gjesing was benched for newly arrived Alex Valencia in the first match of the season against AC Horsens. He afterwards started more regularly during the fall of 2007, but was benched again in spring. He made 23 league appearances during the 2007–08 season, of which 13 were as a substitute.

Gjesing's inconsistent performances for the first team caused some speculation as to whether AGF would offer a contract extension, as players such as Kasper Povlsen, Niels Kristensen and Martin Mikkelsen had surpassed him at his position. Injuries to other players meant that Gjesing made more starts for the first team during the fall of 2008, both at midfield and as a central defender, where he impressed. He finally signed a three-year contract extension with AGF in January 2009. A few months later, on 13 April 2009, Gjesing played his 100th match for AGF against FC Midtjylland. He finished the season with 27 league appearances as the club ended sixth in the Superliga.

Gjesing had a frustrating start to the 2009–10 season, scoring own goals in consecutive matches against FC Midtjylland and HB Køge in the fall which ended up costing AGF four points. His disappointing season continued after the winter break, receiving back-to-back red cards in pre-season friendlies and missing a decisive penalty kick against OB on 21 March 2010. He was benched for Anders Kure in defense after the disappointing performances.

On 17 October 2010, in a Danish Cup-matchup against FC Hjørring, Gjesing tore his cruciate ligament ruling him out for at least eight months. Afterwards, he suffered multiple setbacks, which ruled him out for a longer period and meant that he would miss the 2011–12 season premiere.

==== Loan to Hobro ====
On 29 July 2011, while undergoing rehabilitation for his knee injury, Gjesing was loaned out to Danish 1st Division (second tier) club Hobro IK where he signed a six-month loan deal. At the end of his loan deal, his deal with AGF would also run out. On 9 August, Gjesing made his debut for Hobro in a Danish Cup match against lower-division side Aalborg Freja in which he was sent off for calling an opponent a "faggot" (Danish: bøsserøv). Due to his injury not healing properly, Gjesing called his loan "disappointing" in October 2011.

=== Hobro ===
Despite his injury-related issues, Hobro decided to sign Gjesing on a permanent deal on 10 January 2012, after playing more consistently during the last months of his loan deal. Hobro sporting director, Jens Hammer Sørensen, called the deal a "scoop" and attributed the strong ending to the first half of the 2011–12 season, where the team conceded no goals in the last three games, to Gjesing's performances in defense. In April 2012, however, he tore his cruciate ligament once again in a league match against Brønshøj BK. Despite going through multiple operations, he was unable to make a comeback and announced his retirement from professional football.

=== Retirement ===
Gjesing returned to play for Jutland Series (fifth highest division in Denmark) club Fuglebakken KFUM Århus in November 2015, more than three years after retiring from professional football. He was appointed as a playing assistant-coach.^{[managerial section]}

== International career ==
Gjesing earned his first cap for the Denmark under-20 side on 5 October 2006 in a friendly against Norway U20.

On 27 March 2007, he also made his debut for the Denmark under-21 team in a 2–1 away loss in a friendly against Greece U21 in Athens. Gjesing would go on to make 12 total appearances for the Danish under-21 team, including two legs in the 2009 UEFA European Under-21 Championship qualification play-offs against Serbia U21, which were lost 0–2 on aggregate.

== Managerial career ==
=== Fuglebakken and Fremad II ===
Gjesing started his coaching career in 2015 while playing for lower-level club, Fuglebakken KFUM Århus in the Danish fifth tier. In July 2017, he was named as the new head coach of the reserve team of Aarhus Fremad, competing in the Denmark Series (fourth highest division).

=== VSK Aarhus ===
On 19 November 2018, Gjesing was appointed as the head coach of VSK Aarhus, a merger team in which his first youth club, Vejlby IK, formed one half. He took over a VSK-team competing in the Denmark Series, the fourth tier of Danish football. The club reached promotion to the Danish 2nd Division (third tier) only six months after Gjesing was put in charge of the first team; a promotion which became a fact following a 2–0 win over FC Djursland on 15 June 2019. Following the promotion, Gjesing became manager of VSK, which meant that he became responsible of forming the first team as well as taking executive decisions in the footballing department. He stated that his objective for the club was reaching the Danish 1st Division (second tier) and introducing full-time professionalism in the footballing department, while playing attractive, attacking football.

On 13 March 2021, Gjesing and his assistant Mads Post signed a new three-year contract, extending their tenure at VSK.

=== Hobro IK ===
On 11 August 2025 it was confirmed, that Gjesing had been appointed manager of his former club, Danish 1st Division side Hobro IK.

== Personal life ==
After retiring from professional football, Gjesing took a Bachelor's degree in Marketing management at Business Academy Aarhus in Viby J while attending courses for coaching licenses.
