= Michael Lumb (footballer) =

Danish footballer (born 1988)

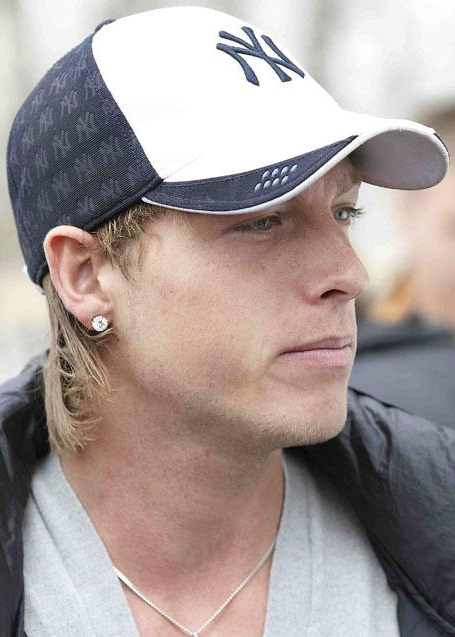
- Lumb in 2010

Personal information
- Full name: Michael Lumb
- Date of birth: 9 January 1988 (age 38)
- Place of birth: Aarhus, Denmark
- Height: 1.77 m (5 ft 10 in)
- Positions: Left-back; midfielder

Youth career
- –1998: Fuglebakken KFUM
- 1998–2005: AGF

Senior career*
| Years | Team | Apps | (Gls) |
| 2005–2010 | AGF | 106 | (2) |
| 2010–2013 | Zenit Saint Petersburg | 3 | (0) |
| 2010 | → Feyenoord (loan) | 2 | (0) |
| 2011 | → AaB (loan) | 14 | (0) |
| 2012 | → SC Freiburg (loan) | 5 | (0) |
| 2013 | VfL Bochum | 13 | (0) |
| 2013–2015 | Vestsjælland | 37 | (0) |
| 2015–2018 | Lyngby | 86 | (4) |
| 2018–2021 | Horsens | 63 | (6) |
| 2021 | Brøndby | 2 | (0) |
| 2022–2023 | Fremad Amager | 27 | (3) |
| 2023 | Holbæk | 14 | (4) |
| 2023 | Brønshøj | 12 | (2) |
| 2024 | Holbæk | | |
| 2025 | Avarta | | |

International career
| 2004 | Denmark U16 | 2 | (0) |
| 2005 | Denmark U17 | 2 | (1) |
| 2005–2006 | Denmark U18 | 4 | (0) |
| 2006–2007 | Denmark U19 | 8 | (0) |
| 2008 | Denmark U20 | 1 | (0) |
| 2008–2011 | Denmark U21 | 11 | (0) |
| 2009–2010 | Denmark | 2 | (0) |

Managerial career
- 2025: Avarta (player-assistant)
- 2025: BK Frem (assistant)
- * Club domestic league appearances and goals

Michael Lumb (Danish pronunciation: [ˈmiˌkʰɛˀl ˈlɔmˀp]; born 9 January 1988) is a Danish former professional footballer who played as a left-back.

Lumb began his career at AGF, where he made over 100 appearances before moving to Zenit Saint Petersburg in 2010. His time in Russia was marked by loan spells at Feyenoord, AaB, and SC Freiburg. He later played for clubs in Denmark and Germany, including VfL Bochum, Vestsjælland, Lyngby, Horsens, and Brøndby, winning the Danish Superliga title with the latter in 2021. Lumb also earned two caps for the Denmark national team.

Following his retirement, he briefly returned to playing at the lower levels before transitioning into coaching.

== Career ==
=== AGF ===
Lumb was born in Aarhus, Denmark, to a Danish mother and an English father. A left-footed player, he primarily operated as a left-back. He emerged from AGF's 1988-born Danish Youth Championship-winning team, which also featured Morten Beck Andersen, Frederik Krabbe, Michael Vester, Niels Kristensen, Jesper Blicher, and Anders Syberg. In the autumn of the 2007–08 season, he was named "Shooting Star" by the Danish newspaper Ekstra Bladet, recognising him as a standout young player.

Lumb played more than 100 matches for AGF in the Danish Superliga and 1st Division.

=== Zenit Saint Petersburg and loans ===
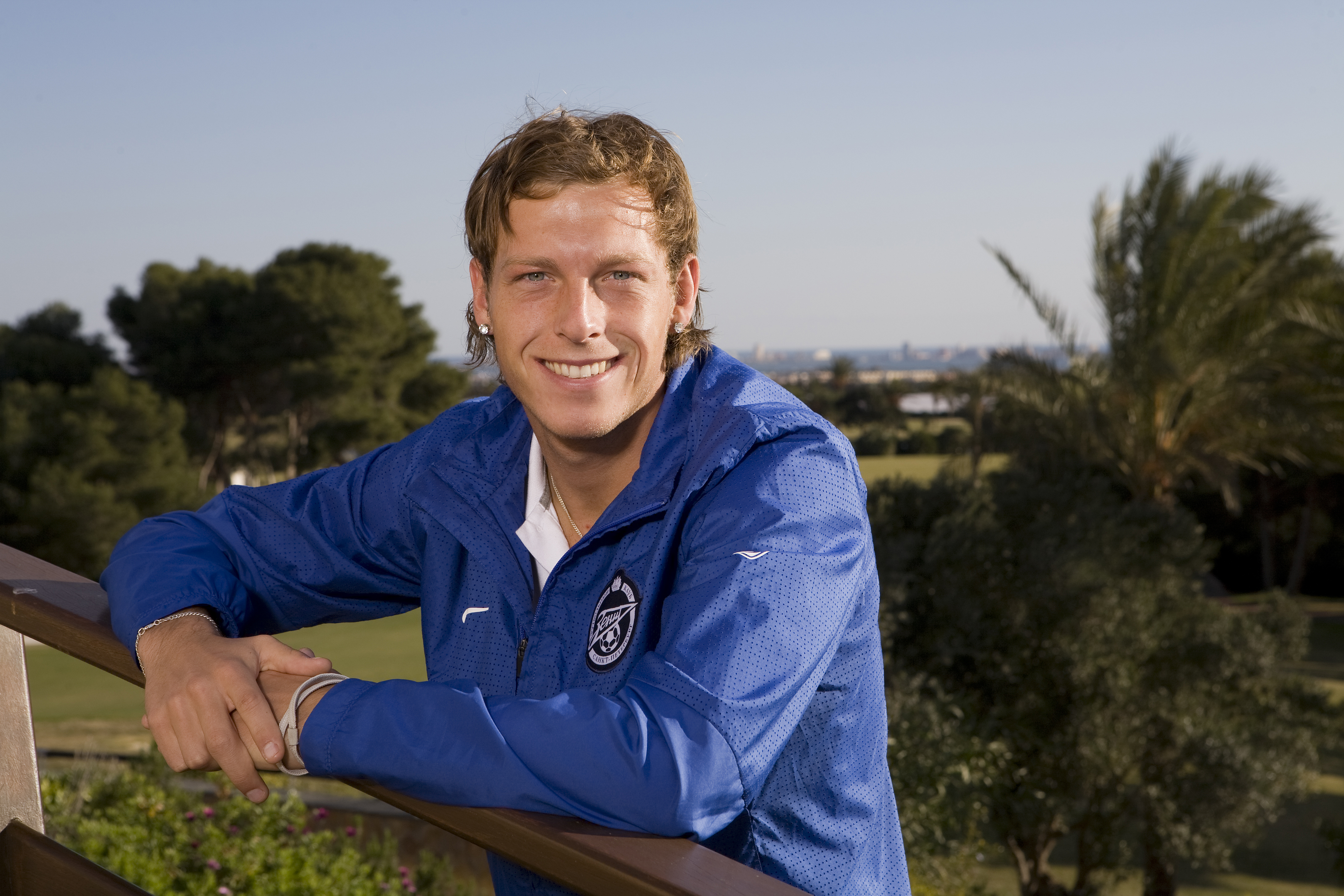
Lumb with Zenit Saint Petersburg in 2010

On 11 January 2010, Lumb signed a three-year contract with Zenit Saint Petersburg, becoming the first Danish player to play in Russia. However, he struggled for playing time due to competition from Slovak international Tomáš Hubočan, making just two first-team appearances in the first half of the 2010 season. The arrival of Serbian left-back Aleksandar Luković further limited his opportunities, prompting a loan move.

Lumb was initially loaned to Dutch side Feyenoord, but he failed to secure a regular place in the team and spent much of his time on the bench or out of the matchday squad. He was subsequently recalled and sent on loan to Danish club AaB in January 2011.

Returning to Zenit in the summer of 2011, Lumb found himself further down the pecking order following the signing of Italy international left wing-back Domenico Criscito. He spent the remainder of the year playing for Zenit's reserve team, occasionally filling in as a centre-back.

In January 2012, Lumb joined SC Freiburg on trial before securing a loan move until the end of the 2011–12 season. He made his debut on 21 January in a 1–0 win over FC Augsburg, providing the assist for debutant Matthias Ginter's winning goal in the 88th minute. Overall, Lumb only made five appearances for Freiburg during the 2011–12 season. In June 2012, Lumb returned to Zenit.

=== Bochum ===
On 25 January 2013, Lumb signed a contract until the end of the season with VfL Bochum. He made his debut for the club on 10 February in a 2–0 home loss against SSV Jahn Regensburg.

=== Vestsjælland ===
On 19 June 2013, Lumb signed a two-year contract with Vestsjælland. Upon signing, manager Ove Pedersen called Lumb "mentally very strong" and stated that he needed to work on "getting his career back on track". A few days later, OB director of sports Jesper Hansen revealed, that he had negotiated a contract with Lumb, but that the latter had eventually decided to sign with Vestsjælland. He made his debut for the club on 21 July in a 1–1 league draw against Brøndby. He suffered a knee injury in December 2013, which required surgery. He was, however, able to play most of the games during the spring on pain killers. He finished the 2013–14 season with 30 total appearances, as FCV ended in ninth place in the league table, six points clear of relegation.

In June 2014, Lumb had surgery for his persistent knee injury, with the first reports being that he would be sidelined him for some months. In September 2014, the injury proved to be worse than expected, and Lumb was announced to be out for the rest of 2014. He made his comeback on 22 March 2015 in a 0–1 home loss to Brøndby. He was in the starting lineup for the game, but was substituted in the second half for Jean-Claude Bozga. He also appeared in the Danish Cup final on 14 May 2015, as Vestsjælland lost 2–3 in extra time to Copenhagen. Lumb finished the season with 9 total appearances, as he struggled with injury. Vestsjælland suffered relegation from the Superliga at the end of the season and Lumb's contract expired, making him a free agent.

=== Lyngby ===
On 17 July 2015, Lumb signed a one-year contract with Lyngby Boldklub, competing in the second-tier 1st Division. Earlier that summer, there were persistent rumours of him rejoining his former club AGF, but a move eventually fell through. Following his move to Lyngby, Lumb said that the "determined" approach of manager David Nielsen had convinced him to sign for the club. He made his debut for the club on 9 August in a 1–0 league win over Silkeborg.

Following promotion in his first season at the club, Lumb scored his first goal for the club on 21 April 2017 in a 2–1 win in the Superliga over SønderjyskE.

=== Horsens ===
On 31 August 2018, Lumb signed a three-year contract with AC Horsens. After signing, Lumb said that he could still develop as a player and praised manager Bo Henriksen's style of play which involved attacking full-backs. He made his debut on 16 September in a 3–2 league win over his former club AGF, coming on as a substitute in the 83rd minute for Hallur Hansson. On 26 November, he scored his first goal for Horsens in the return game against AGF. In the 43rd minute, he fired a long-range shot at AGF-goalkeeper Kasper Kristensen, who failed to save the ball, which bounced off his gloves and into the net. Horsens won the game 2–1. At the end of the season, Lumb was nominated for Horsens Player of the Season, but saw himself beaten by team captain Hallur Hansson. He finished the season with 24 appearances in which he scored three goals.

He continued as a starter at left-back in the 2019–20 season, and attracted interest from clubs abroad. In January 2020, Horsens manager Bo Henriksen confirmed that Greek club Larissa had put in a bid for Lumb's services, as well as an unnamed Turkish club. Horsens ended the regular season – which had been suspended due to the COVID-19 pandemic – in eighth place, but qualified for the Superliga European play-offs by ending first in their group in the relegation round. They were, however, eventually knocked out over two legs to OB. Lumb made 35 total appearances that season, in which he scored three goals.

Horsens started the 2020–21 season poorly under new manager Jonas Dal, who had replaced the outgoing Bo Henriksen. Lumb tested positive for SARS‑CoV‑2 on 14 October 2020. He returned to action on 8 November in a 0–3 league loss to SønderjyskE.

=== Brøndby ===
On 4 January 2021, it was announced that Lumb had signed a one-year contract with Brøndby, replacing regular left-back Blas Riveros who had suffered a season-ending injury. He made his official debut for the club on 4 March as a starter at left wing-back in manager Niels Frederiksen's 3–5–2 formation. He was replaced at half-time for Oskar Fallenius as the match ended in a 0–0 draw. He finished his first six months at Brøndby with only two appearances, as he struggled to make the team. The club would go on the win its first league title in 16 years, which was also Lumb's first league title in his career.

Lumb made a total of three appearances for the club, before he left the club at the end of 2021, where his contract expired.

=== Fremad Amager ===
On 10 January 2022, Lumb signed a deal for the rest of the season with Danish 1st Division club Fremad Amager. He made his competitive debut for the club on 19 February in a 1–1 away draw against Jammerbugt as a starter at left-back. His first goal for the club came on 13 May, slotting home a low cross from a corner kick to deliver the 1–0 winner against HB Køge.

On 7 March 2023, Lumb confirmed that he had decided to retire. His contract with Fremad Amager was therefore terminated.

=== Later career ===
Two weeks after he announced his retirement, he came out of retirement again, when he agreed to play for Denmark Series club Holbæk B&I. In July 2023, Lumb then moved to Brønshøj Boldklub.

At the end of December 2023, Holbæk B&I confirmed that Lumb had returned to the club.

In December 2024, it was announced that Lumb would be joining BK Avarta from 2025, where he had been hired as part of the coaching staff and was also enrolled as part of the squad should the need arise. In July 2025, Lumb joined BK Frem as an assistant coach. On 9 January 2026, the club announced his departure.

== Career statistics ==
Appearances and goals by club, season and competition
| Club | Season | League | | | Cup | | Europe | | Total | |
| Club | Season | Division | Apps | Goals | Apps | Goals | Apps | Goals | Apps | Goals |
|---|---|---|---|---|---|---|---|---|---|---|
| AGF | 2004–05 | Superliga | 1 | 0 | 0 | 0 | — | | 1 | 0 |
| AGF | 2005–06 | Superliga | 11 | 0 | 0 | 0 | — | | 11 | 0 |
| AGF | 2006–07 | 1st Division | 25 | 1 | 0 | 0 | — | | 25 | 1 |
| AGF | 2007–08 | Superliga | 33 | 0 | 0 | 0 | — | | 33 | 0 |
| AGF | 2008–09 | Superliga | 19 | 1 | 2 | 0 | — | | 21 | 2 |
| AGF | 2009–10 | Superliga | 17 | 0 | 0 | 0 | — | | 17 | 0 |
| AGF | Total | | 106 | 2 | 2 | 0 | 0 | 0 | 108 | 2 |
| Zenit Saint Petersburg | 2010 | Russian Premier League | 2 | 0 | 1 | 0 | 0 | 0 | 3 | 0 |
| Zenit Saint Petersburg | 2011–12 | Russian Premier League | 0 | 0 | 0 | 0 | 0 | 0 | 0 | 0 |
| Zenit Saint Petersburg | 2012–13 | Russian Premier League | 1 | 0 | 0 | 0 | 2 (Note: Appearances in UEFA Champions League) | 0 | 3 | 0 |
| Zenit Saint Petersburg | Total | | 3 | 0 | 1 | 0 | 2 | 0 | 6 | 0 |
| Feyenoord (loan) | 2010–11 | Eredivisie | 2 | 0 | 0 | 0 | 0 | 0 | 2 | 0 |
| AaB (loan) | 2010–11 | Superliga | 14 | 0 | 0 | 0 | — | | 14 | 0 |
| SC Freiburg (loan) | 2011–12 | Bundesliga | 5 | 0 | 0 | 0 | — | | 5 | 0 |
| VfL Bochum | 2012–13 | 2. Bundesliga | 13 | 0 | 1 | 0 | — | | 14 | 0 |
| Vestsjælland | 2013–14 | Superliga | 29 | 0 | 1 | 0 | — | | 30 | 0 |
| Vestsjælland | 2014–15 | Superliga | 8 | 0 | 1 | 0 | — | | 9 | 0 |
| Vestsjælland | Total | | 37 | 0 | 2 | 0 | — | | 39 | 0 |
| Lyngby | 2015–16 | 1st Division | 23 | 0 | 0 | 0 | — | | 23 | 0 |
| Lyngby | 2016–17 | Superliga | 32 | 1 | 0 | 0 | — | | 32 | 1 |
| Lyngby | 2017–18 | Superliga | 31 | 3 | 1 | 0 | 6 (Note: Appearances in UEFA Europa League) | 0 | 38 | 3 |
| Lyngby | 2018–19 | 1st Division | 4 | 0 | 1 | 0 | — | | 5 | 0 |
| Lyngby | Total | | 90 | 4 | 2 | 0 | 6 | 0 | 98 | 4 |
| Horsens | 2018–19 | Superliga | 24 | 3 | 0 | 0 | — | | 24 | 3 |
| Horsens | 2019–20 | Superliga | 33 | 3 | 2 | 0 | — | | 35 | 3 |
| Horsens | 2020–21 | Superliga | 8 | 1 | 0 | 0 | — | | 8 | 1 |
| Horsens | Total | | 65 | 7 | 2 | 0 | — | | 67 | 7 |
| Brøndby | 2020–21 | Superliga | 2 | 0 | 0 | 0 | — | | 2 | 0 |
| Brøndby | 2021–22 | Superliga | 0 | 0 | 1 | 0 | 0 | 0 | 1 | 0 |
| Brøndby | Total | | 2 | 0 | 1 | 0 | 0 | 0 | 3 | 0 |
| Fremad Amager | 2021–22 | 1st Division | 14 | 1 | 0 | 0 | — | | 14 | 1 |
| Fremad Amager | 2022–23 | 1st Division | 13 | 2 | 3 | 0 | — | | 16 | 2 |
| Fremad Amager | Total | | 27 | 3 | 3 | 0 | — | | 30 | 3 |
| Holbæk | 2022–23 | Denmark Series | 14 | 4 | 0 | 0 | — | | 14 | 4 |
| Brønshøj | 2023–24 | Denmark Series | 0 | 0 | 0 | 0 | — | | 0 | 0 |
| Career total | | | 378 | 20 | 14 | 0 | 8 | 0 | 400 | 20 |

== Honours ==
Zenit Saint Petersburg

- Russian Cup: 2009–10

Brøndby

- Danish Superliga: 2020–21

Individual

- Danish U21 Player of the Year 2008
