= Jesper Blicher =

Danish footballer (born 1988)

Personal information
- Date of birth: 4 October 1988 (age 38)
- Place of birth: Aarhus, Denmark
- Height: 1.83 m (6 ft 0 in)
- Position: Left winger

Youth career
- –2003: Kolt-Hasselager IF
- 2003–2007: AGF

Senior career*
| Years | Team | Apps | (Gls) |
| 2007–2010 | AGF | 34 | (3) |
| 2009 | → Næstved (loan) | 13 | (5) |
| 2010 | Næstved | 15 | (1) |
| 2010–2012 | Fredericia | 35 | (1) |
| 2012–2015 | Vendsyssel | 58 | (11) |
| 2015–2017 | Lyngby | 15 | (1) |
| 2016–2017 | → Roskilde (loan) | 9 | (0) |
| 2017 | Kolding IF | ? | (?) |
- * Club domestic league appearances and goals

Jesper Blicher (born 4 October 1988) is a Danish former professional football midfielder.

Blicher began playing football in Kolt-Hasselager IF, where he scouted by AGF, where he progressed through the youth academy. He was part of the 1988-generation, who won in the junior league, like Michael Lumb, Frederik Krabbe, Michael Vester, Niels Kristensen, Morten Beck Andersen and Anders Syberg, who all had the onset of AGF's first team.

In autumn 2009 he was loaned to Næstved, and just before the winter transfer window ended he moved permanently to the club.

In 2010, he moved to Fredericia, where he played until 2012 when he got Vendsyssel FF as a new club. In January 2015 he was given at his own request that he want to terminate his contract with the Vendsyssel FF.

On 6 February 2015 he signed a two-year contract with Lyngby Boldklub.

After having played a few months for Kolding IF, Blicher announced his retirement from football in July 2017, citing a lack of time to prioritise football next to a full-time job.
