= 2007 Danish Cup final =

- Event: 2006–07 Danish Cup
Copenhagen	Odense
1	2
- Date: 17 May 2007
- Venue: Parken Stadium, Copenhagen
- Man of the Match: Johan Absalonsen (Odense)
- Referee: Anders Hermansen
- Attendance: 30,013

The 2007 Danish Cup final were the final and deciding match of the 2006–07 Danish Cup. It took place on Thursday 17 May 2007 at Parken Stadium in Copenhagen. The contesting teams were the 2006–07 Danish Superliga leaders, F.C. Copenhagen, and the current no. 2 in the league, Odense Boldklub.

F.C. Copenhagen have won the Cup on three previous occasions (1995, 1997 and 2004). OB have won the Cup four times, in 1983, 1991, 1993 and in 2002 where they beat FCK in the final.

== Route to the final ==
=== Copenhagen ===
In all results below, the score of the finalist is given first.

Round	Opposition	Score
3rd	Thisted (A)	4–1
4th	Esbjerg (H)	3–1
QF	Midtjylland (A)	3–2
SF	Lyngby (A); Lyngby (H)	3–2; 4–0; 7–2 agg.
Key: (H) = Home venue; (A) = Away venue; (N) = Neutral venue.

=== Odense ===
In all results below, the score of the finalist is given first.

Round	Opposition	Score
3rd	Nordsjælland (H)	1–0
4th	Brøndby (H)	1–0
QF	Randers (H)	1–0
SF	Viborg (H); Viborg (A)	1–2; 2–0; 3–2 agg.
Key: (H) = Home venue; (A) = Away venue; (N) = Neutral venue.

== Match details ==
17 May 2007
15:00 CEST

F.C. Copenhagen	1–2	Odense BK
Hutchinson 15'		Borre 36'; Bechara 49'

Parken Stadium, Copenhagen
Attendance: 30,013
Referee: Anders Hermansen

F.C. Copenhagen	Odense Boldklub

F.C. COPENHAGEN:
GK	1	(Denmark) Jesper Christiansen
RB	2	(Denmark) Lars Jacobsen
CB	14	(Denmark) Michael Gravgaard
CB	5	(Norway) Brede Hangeland
LB	3	(Denmark) Niclas Jensen		(substituted off) 74'
RM	8	(Denmark) Michael Silberbauer
CM	6	(Sweden) Tobias Linderoth (c)	(yellow card) 58'
CM	4	(Denmark) Hjalte Nørregaard		(substituted off) 62'
LM	10	(Denmark) Jesper Grønkjær
SS	13	(Canada) Atiba Hutchinson
FW	11	(Sweden) Marcus Allbäck
Substitutes:
GK	31	(Denmark) Benny Gall
FW	7	(Brazil) Aílton José Almeida		(substituted on) 62'
DF	16	(Denmark) Dan Thomassen
MF	23	(Denmark) William Kvist		(substituted on) 74'
Manager:
(Norway) Ståle Solbakken

ODENSE BOLDKLUB:
GK	1	(Poland) Arkadiusz Onyszko
RB	18	(Denmark) Jonas Troest	(yellow card) 43'
CB	4	(Norway) Morten Fevang
CB	3	(Denmark) Ulrik Laursen (c)
LB	15	(Denmark) Chris Sørensen
DM	8	(Brazil) Bechara Oliveira
DM	14	(Denmark) Esben Hansen
RM	17	(Denmark) Martin Borre
AM	11	(Denmark) Johan Absalonsen		(substituted off) 87'
LM	29	(Denmark) Jonas Borring
FW	20	(Denmark) Kim Christensen
Substitutes:
GK	30	(Denmark) Emil Ousager
DF	2	(Norway) Jan Tore Ophaug		(substituted on) 87'
FW	7	(Denmark) Mads Timm
MF	21	(Denmark) Peter Nymann
Manager:
(Denmark) Michael Hemmingsen

== See also ==
- 2006–07 Danish Cup for details of the current competition.
