= Vester =

Vester may refer to:

Places

- Vešter, a settlement in the Municipality of Škofja Loka in the Upper Carniola region of Slovenia
- Vester Hassing, a Danish town in North Jutland, Denmark

People

- Vester Flanagan (1973–2015), American news reporter and murderer
- Vester Pegg (1889–1951), American actor of the silent era
- Vester R. Wright (1921–1966), American Champion Thoroughbred horse racing trainer
- Viestards (?–1230), also known as Vester, Viesthard, Vesthardus, and Viesturs, a Semigallian leader sometimes referred to as King of Semigallia
- Frederic Vester (1925–2003), a German biochemist and expert on ecology
- Hannah Vester (born 2006), German rhythmic gymnast
- Linda Vester (born 1965), American TV news host
- Michael Vester (born 1988), Danish professional football forward
- Saskia Vester (born 1959), German actress and author

Other

- USS Vester (SP-686), a United States Navy patrol vessel and minesweeper in commission from 1917 to 1919
- Vester Guitars, a music instrument manufacturer specializing in guitars and guitar amplifiers
- Vester (supermarket), a supermarket chain in Kazakhstan
