= Ove Christensen =

Danish football manager

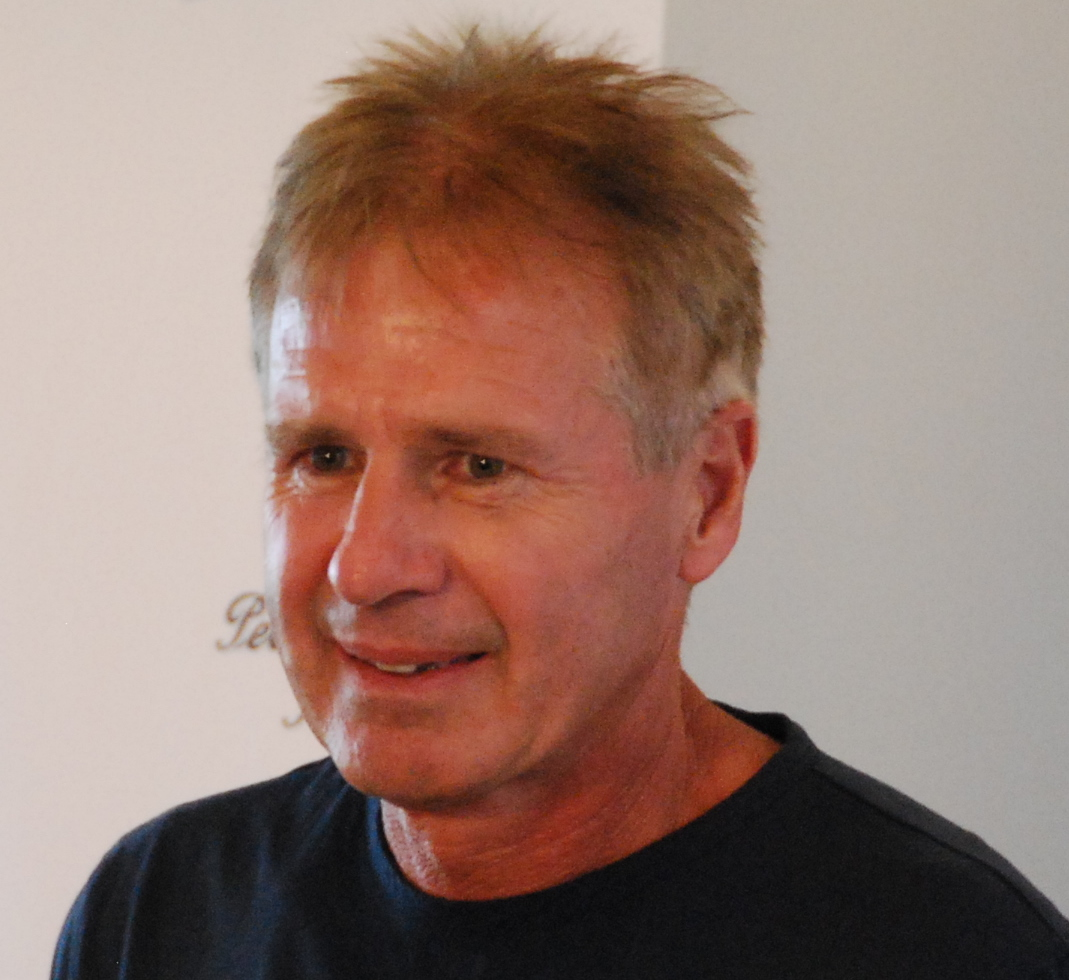
- Ove Christensen in June 2011

Personal information
- Date of birth: 26 March 1950 (age 76)
- Place of birth: Brønderslev, Denmark

Managerial career
- Years: Team
- 1982: Brønderslev IF
- 1983–1984: Vrå IF
- 1985–1988: Fortuna Hjørring (women)
- 1989–1993: Nørresundby Boldklub
- 1994–1995: Fortuna Hjørring (women)
- 1995–1999: Viborg FF
- 1999–2000: Denmark U-17 & U-18
- 2000–2001: Aarhus Gymnastik Forening
- 2001–2003: Akademisk Boldklub
- 2003–2006: Viborg FF
- 2007–2009: Vejle Boldklub
- 2009–2011: Randers FC
- 2011: FC Hjørring
- 2011–2014: Viborg FF
- 2014–2016: Vendsyssel FF
- 2017–: Silkeborg KFUM (director of football)

Ove Christensen (born 26 March 1950) is a Danish football manager who is currently the director of football of Danish fourth tier club Silkeborg KFUM. He has managed a number of Danish Superliga clubs, and won the Danish women's championship with Fortuna Hjørring.

== Coaching career ==
Christensen started his career coaching lower-league clubs, beginning with Brønderslev IF in 1982. He managed Vrå IF, before moving to the women's topflight Elitedivisionen team Fortuna Hjørring in 1985, staying there for three years. He spent four years with men's team Nørresundby Boldklub, guiding the club to the second-tier Danish 1st Division in 1991, with players such as later Danish champions Henrik Rasmussen and Jan Pedersen. He joined Fortuna Hjørring for a second stint in 1994, guiding the club to the Double in 1995, by winning both the Elitedivisionen and the Danish Women's Cup.

In 1995, Christensen was hired by Viborg FF in the men's Danish 1st Division, and guided the club to the top-flight Danish Superliga. He managed the club to the eighth-place finish of the Danish Superliga 1995-96 season. In the following season, the club ended up 11th, and was relegated to the 1st Division. He was allowed to retain his position at the club, and promptly guided the club to promotion for the Superliga the following season. In the Danish Superliga 1998-99 season, he once more secured another eighth-place finish.

In July 1999, he was appointed by the Danish Football Association as manager of the Denmark national under-18 football team, as Viborg agreed to release him from his contract. In practicality, he also served as Flemming Serritslev's assistant coach of the Denmark national under-21 football team, and led that team on a few occasions. He left the position after a year, as he accepted the offer of coaching Superliga club AGF.

He only spent six months in AGF, placing the team in ninth place after the first half of the Danish Superliga 2000-01 season. In the winter break, Christensen handed in his resignation, criticizing the AGF management for a lack of support and presence. Less than two weeks later, he was appointed head coach of rival Superliga team AB, looking to avert relegation. He guided the team to a 10th place, nine points free of the relegation zone. The team also reached the 2001 Danish Cup final, but lost 1–4 to Silkeborg IF. In the following two seasons, Christensen led AB to fifth and ninth-place finishes, respectively. He could not agree a contract extension with AB in the summer 2003, and left the club six months before time.

He was appointed manager of his old club Viborg FF a few days later. He managed Viborg to two seventh-place finishes in his first two seasons with the team. As Viborg lost 2–3 to Silkeborg IF on 12 March 2006, Christensen set a record of 285 matches as coach in the Superliga, breaking the former record set by Peter Rudbæk. As the positive surprise of the Danish Superliga 2005-06 season, Viborg finished in fourth place, with the highest goal tally of the league. The club was off to a bad start of the Danish Superliga 2006-07. In July 2006, Christensen declared he wanted to leave the club after the season, and criticized the Viborg management for confused season preparations, and was in turn fired by the club.

He was hired by Superliga relegation battlers Vejle Boldklub in April 2007. On 9 May 2007 he reclaimed the record of most matches as coach in the Superliga from Viggo Jensen, when Vejle won 3–0 against Esbjerg fB in his 307th match. He could not keep Vejle from relegation, but guided the club to a bounce-back for the Superliga in 2008. At the winter break of the Danish Superliga 2008-09 season, Vejle was placed one point into the relegation zone. With a series of transfer moves, the Vejle squad found renewed optimism before the second half of the season. As Vejle got three points in the first three games of the spring season, Vejle officials sacked Christensen on 17 March 2009. The sacking was criticized as premature, and Vejle got nine points in the remaining 13 games and was relegated.

On 7 October 2009 he was appointed the successor of Superliga club Randers FC's fired Head Coach John 'Faxe' Jensen on a contract for the remainder of the Danish Superliga 2009-10 season. Randers had only two points after 11 games, and the goal of his appointment was to turn the team around and avoid relegation. Randers got six points in the last seven games before the winter break halfway through the season, leaving them 13 points deep in the relegation zone, with all experts forecasting nothing but relegation at the end of the upcoming spring season. In the winter break, Randers parted ways with seven players, bringing in four key signings in Anders Egholm, Yura Movsisyan, Søren Jensen, and Morten Karlsen. With a historic comeback of 16 successive games without losing, Christensen guided Randers two points clear of relegation and kept the club in the top flight. On 17 May 2010 he signed a one-year extension of his contract.

He was sacked by Randers FC in April 2011 due to a series of bad results. On 7 May 2011 he was announced as the successor of Kim Poulsen at Danish 1st Division club FC Hjørring on a contract running for the rest of the 2010–11 season. On 29 June he was returned for a third spell as manager of Viborg FF.

In the 2012–13 season he managed to get Viborg FF promoted back to the Danish Superliga. He had to resign in January 2014 with Viborg in an acceptable 9th place due to a knee injury that prevented him from performing his duties.

In the summer of 2014 he became new manager of Danish 1st Division side Vendsyssel FF. In his first season the club finished 4th in the Danish 1st Division - their best result ever. In his second season the club was in the contest for promotion, but began losing games in the spring of 2016. He left by mutual consent on 23 April 2016.

On 17 January 2017, Christensen was appointed director of football in then Jutland Series (fifth division) side Silkeborg KFUM. Under him, the club was promoted to the fourth division of Danish football.

== Honors ==
- Danish Champion: Fortuna Hjørring, 1994 (women)
- Danish Cup Winner: Fortuna Hjørring, 1995 (women)
