= Michael Lumb =

Michael Lumb may refer to:

- Michael Lumb (cricketer) (born 1980), England international cricketer
- Michael Lumb (footballer) (born 1988), Danish international footballer
