= Krzysztof Popczyński =

Polish footballer and coach

Personal information
- Full name: Krzysztof Popczyński
- Date of birth: 8 March 1969 (age 57)
- Place of birth: Kraków, Poland
- Height: 1.81 m (5 ft 11 in)
- Position: Midfielder

Youth career
- Borek Kraków

Senior career*
Years	Team	Apps	(Gls)
–1990	Garbarnia Kraków		
1990–1995	Hutnik Kraków	139	(19)
1994	→ Kiruna FF (loan)		
1996	Panionios	11	(0)
1996–1997	Borek Kraków		
1997	Hutnik Kraków		
1997–1998	Esbjerg fB		
1998–2001	VB Vagúr	57	(33)
2001	Skawinka Skawina		
2002–2005	GÍ Gøta	67	(19)
2006	HB Tórshavn II	16	(8)
2008	TB Tvøroyri	2	(0)

Managerial career
- 1998–2001: VB Vagúr (player-coach)
- 2002–2005: GÍ Gøta (player-coach)
- 2006–2007: HB Tórshavn (player-coach)
- 2008: TB Tvøroyri (player-coach)
- 2008–2013: Aarhus Fremad
- 2014–2015: FC Djursland
- 2016–2018: Horsens Freja
- 2019–2021: Kjellerup IF
- 2022: Thisted FC
- * Club domestic league appearances and goals

Krzysztof Popczyński (born 8 March 1969) is a Polish football manager and former player who played as a midfielder.

== Career ==
=== Playing career ===
Born in Kraków, Popczyński played for a number of Polish as well as international clubs during his active career. He had his most successful spells in hometown club Hutnik Kraków between 1990 and 1995, where he made 135 appearances and scored 19 goals, and between 1998 and 2001, where he, as a player-manager for Faroese club VB Vagúr managed to score 35 goals throughout three seasons. He furthermore had short spells at Greek club Panionios and Danish club Esbjerg fB.

=== Coaching career ===
Popczyński had a notable run as a player-coach in Faroe Islands, where he besides VB Vagúr also managed GÍ Gøta, HB Tórshavn and TB Tvøroyri.

On 27 July 2008, Popczyński was appointed as the new head coach of Danish club Aarhus Fremad who had recently been relegated from the Danish second tier. He coached the club for five years, before being sacked in favour of Jesper Tollefsen in July 2013 after missing promotion play-offs.

In November 2014, Popczyński signed a one-year contract to replace Jesper Borup as the head coach of FC Djursland who were at the bottom of the Danish fourth division. However, he was unable to keep the team up and the club was relegated to the Jutland Series, the fifth tier of Danish football at the end of the season. Another horrific season followed, in which Djursland suffered relegation to the sixth tier, after a decisive 3–1 loss in the penultimate round of the season to Fuglebakken KFUM. Popczyński announced his resignation as of 31 October 2015, a few games before the second consecutive relegation became a fact.

In October 2017, Popczyński was named the new manager of Horsens Freja competing in the Danish fifth tier. He signed a two-year contract, and would be coaching the first team while completing his Danish Football Union coaching degree. On 5 November 2018, however, he resigned from his position at Horsens Freja citing disagreements over personal ambitions regarding amount of training sessions with the first-team's lacking ambitions.

A month later, on 12 December 2018, Popczyński was announced as the new head coach of Danish third tier club Kjellerup IF, who were bottom of the table. He was sacked by Kjellerup in November 2021.

In July 2022 he was announced as the new manager of Thisted FC in the Danish 2nd Division. He left the club on 7 November 2022.

== Honours ==
=== Manager ===
VB Vágur

- Faroe Islands Premier League: 2000

GÍ Gøta

- Faroe Islands Cup: 2005

HB Tórshavn

- Faroe Islands Premier League: 2006

== Career statistics ==
=== Manager ===
As of 1 July 2013

Team	Nat	Year	Record				
Team	Nat	Year	G	W	D	L	Win
Vágs Bóltfelag	(Faroe Islands)	1998	18	5	6	7	27.78%
Vágs Bóltfelag	(Faroe Islands)	1999	18	6	3	9	33.33%
Vágs Bóltfelag	(Faroe Islands)	2000	18	12	4	2	66.67%
Vágs Bóltfelag	(Faroe Islands)	2001	18	9	3	6	50%
GÍ Gøta	(Faroe Islands)	2002	18	10	2	6	55.56%
GÍ Gøta	(Faroe Islands)	2003	18	5	5	8	27.78%
GÍ Gøta	(Faroe Islands)	2004	18	6	5	7	33.33%
GÍ Gøta	(Faroe Islands)	2005	29	8	5	16	27.59%
Havnar Bóltfelag	(Faroe Islands)	2006	27	16	7	4	59.26%
Havnar Bóltfelag	(Faroe Islands)	2007	27	15	4	8	55.56%
Tvøroyrar Bóltfelag	(Faroe Islands)	2008					
Aarhus Fremad	(Denmark)	2008–09	30	13	6	11	43.33%
Aarhus Fremad	(Denmark)	2009–10	30	17	8	5	56.67%
Aarhus Fremad	(Denmark)	2010–11	30	19	6	5	63.33%
Aarhus Fremad	(Denmark)	2011–12	30	12	10	8	40%
Aarhus Fremad	(Denmark)	2012–13	30	18	7	5	60%
Total			356	171	81	107	48.03%
