= Blicher =

Blicher is a surname. Notable people with the surname include:

- Jesper Blicher (born 1988), Danish footballer
- Steen Blicher (1923–2018), Danish footballer
- Steen Steensen Blicher (1782–1848), Danish author and poet
- Steen Steensen Blicher (1899–1965), Danish footballer
