= 2007–08 Danish 1st Division =

63rd season of Danish 1st Division

Viasat Divisionen
- Season: 2007–08
- Champions: Vejle BK
- Promoted: Vejle BK; SønderjyskE
- Relegated: HIK; Aarhus Fremad; Ølstykke FC
- Goals: 681
- Average goals/game: 2,84
- Top goalscorer: Pablo Piñones-Arce (17)
- Biggest home win: Vejle BK 8-0 HIK (2007-09-23)
- Biggest away win: Ølstykke FC 0-5 Silkeborg IF (2007-09-23)
- Highest scoring: Vejle BK 5-3 Hvidovre IF (2007-08-26); Vejle BK 8-0 HIK (2007-09-23) (8 goals)

The 2007–08 Danish 1st Division (known as the Viasat Divisionen due to sponsorship by Viasat) season was the 13th season of the Danish 1st Division league championship, governed by the Danish Football Association. It took place from the first match on August 4, 2007 to the final match on June 8, 2008.

The division-champion and runner-up promotes to the 2008–09 Danish Superliga. The teams in the 14th, 15th and 16th places will be divided between 2nd Division East and West, based on location.

You can see the fixture schedule here.

== Participants ==
Clubs placed on map

Club	Finishing position last season	First season of current spell in 1st Division
Aarhus Fremad	11th	2006–07
AB	10th	2004–05
BK Frem	5th	2004–05
FC Fredericia	4th	2001–02
Herfølge BK	9th	2005–06
HIK	13th	2004–05
Hvidovre IF	3rd in 2nd Division East	2007–08
Kolding FC	6th	2005–06
Køge BK	7th	2003–04
Lolland-Falster Alliancen	1st in 2nd Division East	2007–08
Næstved BK	8th	2006–07
Silkeborg IF	12th in Superliga	2007–08
Skive IK	1st in 2nd Division West	2007–08
SønderjyskE	3rd	2006–07
Vejle BK	11th in Superliga	2007–08
Ølstykke FC	12th	2002–03

=== Odds ===
Club	Odds	Frac.
Vejle	2.61	8/5
Silkeborg	3.31	23/10
SønderjyskE	4.76	15/4
Kolding	12.37	23/2
Fredericia	13.23	25/2
AB	32.32	31/1
Herfølge	38.86	38/1
Næstved	42.55	42/1
Køge	42.86	42/1
Frem	45.14	44/1
LFA	70.27	69/1
Ølstykke	112.27	111/1
HIK	127.82	127/1
Hvidovre	219.18	218/1
Skive	240.09	239/1
Aarhus F.	273.73	273/1

Before the season, Superliga-relegated Vejle was considered the 8/5-favorite to win the division and regain promotion along with fellow relegated Silkeborg at 23/10, with former Superliga-side SønderjyskE the only notable contender for the title at 15/4. The outsiders for promotion were local rivals Kolding and Fredericia.

The fight in the middle of the pack was predicted to contended by AB, Herfølge, Næstved, Køge and Frem, while Lolland-Falster Alliancen, Ølstykke and HIK would contend the lower third.

The two newly promoted teams, Skive and Hvidovre were, along with last year's 11th-place finisher, Aarhus Fremad, the favorites to get relegated.

== League table ==
Pos	Team	Pld	W	D	L	GF	GA	GD	Pts	Promotion or relegation
1	Vejle BK (C, P)	30	25	3	2	80	24	+56	78	Promotion to Danish Superliga
2	SønderjyskE (P)	30	17	10	3	55	32	+23	61	Promotion to Danish Superliga
3	Silkeborg IF	30	16	9	5	60	33	+27	57	
4	Herfølge Boldklub	30	15	6	9	55	43	+12	51	
5	Fredericia	30	12	8	10	49	36	+13	44	
6	AB	30	11	8	11	38	36	+2	41	
7	Kolding FC	30	11	7	12	53	47	+6	40	
8	Næstved BK	30	11	7	12	36	39	−3	40	
9	Hvidovre IF	30	10	7	13	31	33	−2	37	
10	Skive IK	30	10	4	16	36	52	−16	34	
11	Frem (Note: Frem was docked six points because of the club's compulsory composition.)	30	12	3	15	46	54	−8	33	
12	LFA	30	8	9	13	28	41	−13	33	
13	Køge BK	30	8	9	13	36	51	−15	33	
14	HIK (R)	30	8	7	15	36	56	−20	31	Relegation to Danish 2nd Divisions
15	Aarhus Fremad (R)	30	7	7	16	22	43	−21	28	Relegation to Danish 2nd Divisions
16	Ølstykke FC (R)	30	4	6	20	20	61	−41	18	Relegation to Danish 2nd Divisions

Source: Danish Football Association
Rules for classification: 1) points; 2) goal difference; 3) number of goals scored.
(C) Champions; (P) Promoted; (R) Relegated

== Top goalscorers ==
Pos	Player	Scored for	Goals
1	(Sweden) Pablo Piñones-Arce	Vejle BK	17
2	(Denmark) Kenneth Fabricius	SønderjyskE	16
2	(Denmark) Rasmus Katholm	FC Fredericia	16
4	(Denmark) Anders Clausen	SønderjyskE; Hvidovre IF	15
5	(Nigeria) Adeshina Lawal	Vejle BK	14
5	(Denmark) Henrik Toft	Vejle BK; Herfølge BK	14
7	(Kenya) Emmanuel Ake	HIK	13
8	(Denmark) Lasse Ankjær	Skive IK	12
9	(Nigeria) Akeem Agbetu	Kolding FC	11
9	(Denmark) Simon Azoulay	Silkeborg IF	11
9	(Denmark) Martin B. Christensen	LFA	11
9	(Denmark) Jesper Jørgensen	Kolding FC	11

== See also ==
- 2007-08 in Danish football
