= Bundgaard =

Bundgaard is a surname. Notable people with the surname include:

- Anders Bundgaard (1864–1937), Danish sculptor
- Filip Bundgaard (born 2004), Danish footballer
- Henrik Bundgaard (born 1975), Danish footballer
- Oliver Bundgaard (born 2001), Danish footballer
- Poul Bundgaard (1922–1998), Danish actor and singer
- Scott Bundgaard (born 1968), American politician
- Sine Bundgaard (born 1970), Danish soprano
- Søren Bundgaard, a member of the music group Hot Eyes
