= Aabyhøj IF =

Danish sports club

- Full name: Aabyhøj Idrætsforening
- Short name: AaIF
- Founded: 8 July 1919; 105 years ago as Aabyhøj IF Thrott
- Ground: Aabyhøj Stadium
- Capacity: 2,500 (50 seated)
- Chairman: Preben Andersen
- Head coach: Emil Eriksen
- League: Jutland Series
- 2019–20: Jutland Series, Group 4, 3rd of 8
- Website: http://www.aaiffodbold.dk/
Home colours	Away colours

Aabyhøj Idrætsforening (Danish: [ɔpyˈhʌjˀ ˈitʁætsfʌˌe̝ˀne̝ŋ]; commonly known as Aabyhøj IF), is a sports club based in Aabyhøj, Jutland, Denmark. Founded in 1919 as Aabyhøj Idrætsforening "Thrott" by a group of local young men, the club mainly features association football. The men's team competes in the Jutland Series, the fifth tier of the Danish football league system and the highest division of the regional DBU Jutland association.

A club focusing mainly on youth development, Aabyhøj IF has brought forward players such as John Stampe, John Amdisen, Finn Overby, Lars Jensen, Tom Bonde, Claus Christiansen, Peter Vesterdal, Henrik Bundgaard and Frederik Krabbe.

== History ==
Having been founded on 8 July 1919 as Aabyhøj Idrætsforening "Thrott", the club had its first home ground at Åby Østergård close to Silkeborgvej, a main boulevard in Aarhus. The name Thrott comes from the Old Norse: þróttr, which means "strength". The club became a member of Jydsk Boldspil-Union (JBU) in 1920, and in September of that year, Aabyhøj IF played its first noteworthy matches in a tournament against teams from AGF, AIA, Aarhus 1900, Vejlby IK. At this point, a wrestling department had already formed in the club, which still today bears the name Thrott. Later, tennis, athletics, boxing and gymnastics were added as new departments, and the club also featured a women's department with Danish longball and gymnastics. Because the departments could not agree on financial distribution, the club split in three parts as the wrestling and tennis departments became independent clubs.

In 1921, Aabyhøj IF moved their home ground to an area between Silkeborgvej and Åbyvej, where a stadium was opened in 1929. A new stadium – Aabyhøj Stadium – was opened on 2 July 1944, where the club continues to play its home games. A clubhouse was built adjacent to the stadium in 1969; the club's 50th anniversary.

Despite Aabyhøj IF never having made the higher divisions of Danish football, the club has become an established institution in Aarhus.
