= Baekgaard =

Baekgaard or Bækgaard is a Danish surname. Notable people with the surname include:

- Barbara Bradley Baekgaard (born 1939), American fashion designer
- Simon Bækgaard (born 1999), Danish footballer
- Brian Baekgaard (born 1985) Canadian Freedom Convoy
