= Thomas Nørgaard =

Thomas Nørgaard may refer to:

- Thomas Nørgaard (footballer) (born 1987), Danish goalkeeper
- Thomas Nørgaard (football manager) (born 1982), Danish football manager
