= Jesper Tollefsen =

Danish football manager (born 1971)

Personal information
- Full name: Jesper Klaus Tollefsen
- Date of birth: 27 January 1971 (age 55)
- Place of birth: Denmark

Managerial career
- Years: Team
- 2000–2001: Aarhus GF (assistant)
- 2001–2003: FC Aarhus
- 2003–2004: FC Hjørring
- 2005–2007: Aarhus GF (assistant)
- 2005: Aarhus GF (caretaker)
- 2007: Leiknir
- 2007–2008: Víkingur
- 2009–2011: Lolland-Falster Alliancen
- 2011–2013: FC Fyn
- 2013–2014: Aarhus Fremad

Jesper Klaus Tollefsen (born 27 January 1971) is a Danish football manager most recently in charge of Aarhus Fremad.

== Coaching career ==
Jesper Tollefsen started his managerial career as Ove Christensen's assistant af Aarhus GF. His first job as head coach was at FC Aarhus (now Aarhus Fremad).

He later managed FC Hjørring and returned as assistant of Sören Åkeby and Ove Pedersen at Aarhus GF.

After having managed a couple of clubs on Iceland he returned to Denmark to coach Lolland-Falster Alliancen in January 2009. Despite a successful end to the 2010–11 season, he resigned at the end of the season and was replaced by Jeppe Tengbjerg.

In July 2011 he was named new manager of FC Fyn. He guided the club to promotion to the Danish 1st Division in his first season. His second season at the club ended prematurely on 31 January 2013, when the club filed for bankruptcy, which resulted in the club being dissolved and withdrawn from the tournament.

In July 2013 he returned as manager to the Danish 2nd Division West club Aarhus Fremad (he was manager of the club from 2001 until 2003), where he replaced Krzysztof Popczyński. The 2013–14 season ended in relegation, and as a result of that Tollefsen was sacked on 30 June 2014.
