= 2006–07 in Danish football =

Danish football season

Football in Denmark
- Season: 2006–07

The 2006–07 season in Danish football, began in July 2006 and ended in June 2007.

== Overview ==
From the 2006–07 season, B 1909, B 1913 and Dalum IF merged into FC FYN. All three clubs played in the 2005–06 season in 2nd Division West. FC FYN will also play in the 2nd Division.

From this season, the Cup will take a make-over. The current eight rounds will be shorted to seven. The teams from 1st Division placed 1 to 4 in 2005–06 and the teams from Superligaen placed 5–12 in 2005–06 will start in the 2nd round. The teams from Superligaen placed 1–4 in 2005–06 will start in the 3rd round.

Parken Stadium will be expanded in the autumn 2006 from 42,100 seats to 42,765. The Coca-Cola stand will be demolished, and a new one will come up. The current Coca-Cola stand is from the 1950s and is the only memory from the old Idrætsparken.

== Events ==
- 2006-07-02: Odense BK won their first Intertoto Cup 2nd round match, against Irish Shelbourne F.C. 3–0 at Fionia Park.
- 2006-07-09: Odense BK lost their last Intertoto Cup 2nd round match, against Irish Shelbourne F.C. 0–1 at Tolka Park, but went further to the Intertoto Cup 3rd round 3–1 agg.
- 2006-07-13: Brøndby IF and Randers FC played their first UEFA Cup 1st qual. round match against respectively Valur and ÍA Akraness at respectively Brøndby Stadium and Essex Park Randers. Both teams are Icelandic. Brøndby won 3–1 and Randers 1–0.
- 2006-07-15: Odense BK won their first Intertoto Cup 3rd round match, against Scottish Hibernian F.C. 1–0 at Fionia Park.
- 2006-07-16: Brøndby IF won the League Cup at Farum Park in front of FC København and Viborg FF.
- 2006-07-19: The Superliga kicked off.
- 2006-07-22: Odense BK lost their last Intertoto Cup 3rd round match, against Scottish Hibernian F.C. 1–2 at Easter Road, but went further to the UEFA Cup 2nd qual. round on the away goal rule.
- 2006-07-25: FC København won the first Champions League 2nd qual. round match against Finnish MyPa 2–0 at Parken Stadium.
- 2006-07-27: Brøndby IF and Randers FC played their last UEFA Cup 1st qual. round match against respectively Valur and ÍA Akraness at respectively Hlíðarendi and Akranesvöllur. Both teams are Icelandic. Brøndby played 0–0 and went through to the 2nd qual. round on 3–1 agg. Randers lost 2–1, but with 2–2 agg. they went also through to the 2nd qual. round on the away goal rule.
- 2006-07-29: The 1st Division kicked off.
- 2006-08-02: FC København played 2–2 in their last Champions League 2nd qual. round match against Finnish MyPa at Saviniemi, and went through to 3rd qual. round on 4–2 agg.
- 2006-08-05: The 2nd Divisions kicked off.
- 2006-08-09: The Cup kicked off.
- 2006-08-09: FC København played their first Champions League 3rd qual. round match against Dutch Ajax Amsterdam at Parken Stadium.
- 2006-08-10: Brøndby IF, Odense BK and Randers FC played their first UEFA Cup 2nd qual. round match against respectively FC Flora Tallinn, Llanelli A.F.C. and FBK Kaunas at respectively A.Le Coq Arena, Fionia Park and Essex Park Randers.
- 2006-08-23: FC København played their last Champions League 3rd qual. round match against Dutch Ajax Amsterdam at Amsterdam Arena.
- 2006-08-24: Brøndby IF, Odense BK and Randers FC played their last UEFA Cup 2nd qual. round match against respectively FC Flora Tallinn, Llanelli A.F.C. and FBK Kaunas at respectively Brøndby Stadium, Liberty Stadium and S.Dariaus ir S.Girėno Stadium.
- 2007-05-17: The Cup final was held at Parken Stadium.
- 2007-05-28: Last round in the Superliga.
- 2007-06-10: Last round in the 2nd Divisions.
- 2007-06-23: Last round in the 1st Division.

== National team results ==
Date	Venue	Opponents	Score*	Competition	Denmark scorers	Report Tickets
16 August 2006	Fionia Park, Odense (H)	Poland	2–0	F	Nicklas Bendtner, Dennis Rommedahl	Report; UEFA
1 September 2006	Brøndby Stadium, Brøndby (H)	Portugal	4–2	F	Jon Dahl Tomasson, Thomas Kahlenberg, Martin Jørgensen, Nicklas Bendtner	Report; UEFA
6 September 2006	Laugardalsvöllur, Reykjavík (A)	Iceland	2–0	ECQF	Dennis Rommedahl, Jon Dahl Tomasson	Report; UEFA
7 October 2006	Parken Stadium, Copenhagen (H)	Northern Ireland	0–0	ECQF		Report; UEFA
11 October 2006	Rheinpark Stadion, Vaduz (A)	Liechtenstein	4–0	ECQF	Daniel Jensen, Michael Gravgaard, Jon Dahl Tomasson (2)	Report; UEFA
15 November 2006	Toyota Arena, Prague (A)	Czech Republic	1–1	F	Peter Løvenkrands	Report; UEFA
20 January 2007	Home Depot Center, Carson, California (A)	United States	1–3	LT	Dennis Sørensen	Report; UEFA
24 January 2007	Estadio Cuscatlán, San Salvador (A)	El Salvador	0–1	LT		Report; UEFA
27 January 2007	Estadio Tiburcio Carías Andino, Tegucigalpa (A)	Honduras	1–1	LT	Morten Nordstrand	
7 February 2007	Loftus Road, London (N)	Australia	3–1	F	Jon Dahl Tomasson (2), Daniel Jensen	
24 March 2007	Estadio Santiago Bernabéu, Madrid (A)	Spain	1–2	ECQF	Michael Gravgaard	
28 March 2007	MSV Arena, Duisburg (A)	Germany	1–0	F	Nicklas Bendtner	
2 June 2007	Parken Stadium, Copenhagen (H)	Sweden	0–3 (a)	ECQF	Daniel Agger, Jon Dahl Tomasson, Leon Andreasen	
6 June 2007	Skonto Stadions, Riga (A)	Latvia	2–0	ECQF	Dennis Rommedahl (2)	

* Denmark scores first

Key

- H = Home match
- A = Away match
- N = Neutral site match
- F = Friendly
- LT = League team (non-official)
- ECQF = European Championship 2008 Qualifying, Group F

== Honours ==
Competition	Winner	Additional information
SAS Ligaen	FC København	
National Cup	Odense Boldklub	
Tele2 League Cup	Brøndby IF	FC København ended second and Viborg FF third.
Viasat Sport Divisionen	Lyngby BK	
2nd Division East	Lolland Falster Alliancen	
2nd Division West	Skive IK	

== See also ==
- 2006–07 Danish Superliga season
- 2006–07 Danish 1st Division season
- 2006–07 Danish Cup season
