= 2007–08 in Danish football =

Football in Denmark
- Season: 2007–08

The 2007-08 season in Danish football, starting July 2007 and ending June 2008.

== Club results ==
=== Domestic honours ===
Competition	Details	Winner
SAS Ligaen	2007-08	AaB
Danish Cup	2007-08	Brøndby IF
Viasat Sport Divisionen	2007-08	Vejle B
2nd Division East	2007-08	FC Roskilde
2nd Division West	2007-08	Thisted FC

=== European participation ===
For the first time since the 2002-03 season, the Danish clubs had obtained enough UEFA coefficient points to qualify the third-place finisher of the Danish Superliga 2006-07 for the UEFA Cup. Prior to this, only the second-place finisher would qualify, alongside the Danish Cup winner and the occasional Intertoto qualifier.

Team	Eligibility	Competition	Result
F.C. Copenhagen	2006-07 Superliga winner	UEFA Champions League 2007-08	Eliminated by S.L. Benfica in 2nd qualifying round
F.C. Copenhagen	2006-07 Superliga winner	UEFA Cup 2007-08	4th place in Group B
FC Midtjylland	2nd in 2006-07 Superliga	UEFA Cup 2007-08	Eliminated by Lokomotiv Moscow in 1st round
AaB	3rd in 2006-07 Superliga	UEFA Cup 2007-08	4th place in Group G
OB	2006-07 Cup winner	UEFA Cup 2007-08	Eliminated by Sparta Prague in 1st round

== National team ==
=== Players ===
The following players appeared for Denmark during the 2007-08 season. All caps and goals are tallied for the 2007-08 season only.

No.	Pos.	Player	Date of birth (age)	Caps	Goals	Club
	GK	Thomas Sørensen	June 12, 1976	9	0	(The Football Association) Aston Villa
	GK	Jesper Christiansen	April 24, 1978	2	0	(Danish Football Association) Copenhagen
	DF	Martin Laursen	July 26, 1977	7	1	(The Football Association) Aston Villa
	DF	William Kvist	February 24, 1985	6	0	(Danish Football Association) F.C. Copenhagen
	DF	Per Krøldrup	July 31, 1979	6	0	(Italian Football Federation) Fiorentina
	DF	Ulrik Laursen	February 28, 1976	5	1	(Danish Football Association) F.C. Copenhagen (Note: Began the 2007-08 season with OB.)
	DF	Niclas Jensen	August 17, 1974	5	0	(Danish Football Association) F.C. Copenhagen
	DF	Chris Sørensen	July 27, 1977	5	0	(Danish Football Association) OB
	DF	Thomas Helveg	June 24, 1971	4	0	(Danish Football Association) OB
	DF	Thomas Rasmussen	April 16, 1977	4	0	(Danish Football Association) Brøndby IF
	DF	Michael Gravgaard	April 3, 1978	3	0	(Danish Football Association) F.C. Copenhagen
	DF	Daniel Agger	December 12, 1984	3	0	(The Football Association) Liverpool
	DF	Lars Jacobsen	September 20, 1979	2	0	(German Football Association) 1. FC Nürnberg
	DF	Anders Møller Christensen	July 26, 1977	2	0	(Danish Football Association) OB
	DF	Kasper Bøgelund	October 8, 1980	1	0	(German Football Association) Borussia Mönchengladbach
	DF	Brian Priske	May 14, 1977	1	0	(Royal Belgian Football Association) Club Brugge
	DF	Anders Randrup	July 16, 1988	1	0	(Danish Football Association) Brøndby IF
	MF	Thomas Kahlenberg	March 20, 1983	8	1	(French Football Federation) AJ Auxerre
	MF	Christian Poulsen	February 28, 1980	8	1	(Royal Spanish Football Federation) Sevilla FC
	MF	Leon Andreasen	April 23, 1983	7	0	(The Football Association) Fulham (Note: Began the 2007-08 season with Werder Bremen.)
	MF	Daniel Jensen	June 25, 1979	6	0	(German Football Association) Werder Bremen
	MF	Kenneth Perez	August 29, 1974	5	0	(Royal Dutch Football Association) Ajax (Note: Began the 2007-08 season with PSV Eindhoven.)
	MF	Martin Vingaard	March 20, 1985	2	1	(Danish Football Association) Esbjerg fB
	MF	Rasmus Würtz	September 18, 1983	2	0	(Danish Football Association) F.C. Copenhagen
	MF	Simon Poulsen	October 7, 1984	2	0	(Danish Football Association) FC Midtjylland
	MF	Mikkel Beckmann	October 24, 1983	2	0	(Danish Football Association) Lyngby BK
	MF	Thomas Kristensen	April 17, 1983	2	0	(Danish Football Association) FC Nordsjælland
	MF	Martin Retov	May 5, 1980	2	0	(Danish Football Association) Brøndby IF
	MF	Jan Kristiansen	August 4, 1981	1	0	(German Football Association) 1. FC Nürnberg
	MF	Esben Hansen	August 10, 1981	1	0	(German Football Association) 1. FC Kaiserslautern
	MF	Niki Zimling	April 19, 1985	1	0	(Danish Football Association) Esbjerg fB
	MF	Mikkel Thygesen	October 22, 1984	1	0	(Danish Football Association) FC Midtjylland
	MF	Thomas Augustinussen	March 20, 1981	1	0	(Danish Football Association) AaB
	FW	Dennis Rommedahl	July 22, 1978	11	1	(Royal Dutch Football Association) Ajax
	FW	Nicklas Bendtner	January 16, 1988	10	4	(The Football Association) Arsenal
	FW	Jon Dahl Tomasson	August 29, 1976	9	5	(Royal Spanish Football Federation) Villarreal CF
	FW	Jesper Grønkjær	August 12, 1977	5	0	(Danish Football Association) F.C. Copenhagen
	FW	Martin Jørgensen	October 6, 1975	5	0	(Italian Football Federation) Fiorentina
	FW	Peter Løvenkrands	January 29, 1980	3	0	(German Football Association) Schalke 04
	FW	Morten Nordstrand	June 8, 1983	3	2	(Danish Football Association) F.C. Copenhagen
	MF	Dennis Sørensen	May 24, 1981	2	0	(German Football Association) Energie Cottbus
	FW	Søren Larsen	September 6, 1981	1	0	(German Football Association) Schalke 04

=== Friendly matches ===
The home team is on the left column; the away team is on the right column.

August 22, 2007	Denmark	0 – 4	Republic of Ireland	NRGi Park, Aarhus
20:00		Report	Keane 29' 40'; Long 54' 66'	Attendance: 17,331; Referee: Thomas Einweller (Austria)

February 6, 2008	Slovenia	1 – 2	Denmark	Športni Park, Nova Gorica
20:00	Novakovic 37'	Report	Tomasson 30'; Bendtner 62'	Attendance: 2,300; Referee: Thorsten Kinhöfer (Germany)

March 26, 2008	Denmark	1 – 1	Czech Republic	SAS Arena, Herning
20:15	Bendtner 26'	Report	Koller 42'	Attendance: 10,476; Referee: Thomasz Mikulski (Poland)

May 29, 2008	Netherlands	1 – 1	Denmark	Philips Stadion, Eindhoven
20:00	van Nistelrooy 29'	Report	Poulsen 55'	Attendance: 34,000; Referee: Tony Chapron (France)

June 1, 2008	Poland	1 – 1	Denmark	Silesian Stadium, Chorzów
16:00	Zurawski (penalty missed); Krzynowek 42'	Report	Vingaard 27'	Attendance: 40,000; Referee: Philippe Kalt (France)

=== European Championship qualifiers ===
Denmark competed in the UEFA Euro 2008 qualifying Group F.

September 8, 2007	Sweden	0 – 0	Denmark	Råsunda Stadion, Stockholm
20:30		Report		Attendance: 33,082; Referee: Frank De Bleeckere (Belgium)

September 12, 2007	Denmark	4 – 0	Liechtenstein	NRGi Park, Aarhus
20:00	Nordstrand 3' 36'; M. Laursen 12'; Tomasson 18'	Report		Attendance: 20,005; Referee: Mark Clattenburg (England)

October 13, 2007	Denmark	1 – 3	Spain	NRGi Park, Aarhus
20:00	Tomasson 88'	Report	Raúl Tamudo 14'; Sergio Ramos 40'; Albert Riera 89'	Attendance: 19,849; Referee: Michel Lubos (Slovakia)

October 17, 2007	Denmark	3 – 1	Latvia	Parken, Copenhagen
20:00	Tomasson 7'; U. Laursen 27'; Rommedahl 90'	Report	Gorkšs 80'	Attendance: 19,004; Referee: Cüneyt Çakır (Turkey)

November 17, 2007	Northern Ireland	2 – 1	Denmark	Windsor Park, Belfast
19:45	Feeney 52'; Healy 80'	Report	Bendtner 51'	Attendance: 14,000; Referee: Pieter Vink (Netherlands)

November 21, 2007	Denmark	3 – 0	Iceland	Parken, Copenhagen
20:00		Report	Bendtner 34'; Tomasson 44'; Kahlenberg 59'	Attendance: 15,393; Referee: Olegario Benquerenca (Portugal)
