= 2006–07 Danish Cup =

DBU Pokalen (The DBU Cup)

Tournament details
- Country: Denmark

Final positions
- Champions: OB
- Runners-up: F.C. Copenhagen

The 2006–07 Danish Cup was the 53rd season of the Danish Cup. The tournament was won by Odense Boldklub who defeated F.C. Copenhagen on 17 May 2007 in Parken Stadium. It was OB's fifth title of the tournament.

The winner qualified for UEFA Cup qualification.

== First round ==
In first round competed 50 teams from the "series" (2005 Denmark Series and lower), 26 teams from 2005–06 Danish 2nd Divisions and 12 teams from 2005–06 Danish 1st Division (no. 5 to 16).

The draw was held on 29 June 2006.

=== West ===
==== North ====
Team 1	Score	Team 2
8 August 2006
Sjørring BK	0–4	Skive IK
9 August 2006
NUBI	0–3	Nibe BK
Skagen IK	1–2	Frederikshavn fI
Koldby/Hørdum IF	0–9	Thisted FC
Aars IK	2–1	Jetsmark IF
Hobro IK	1–4	FC Hjørring

==== Central ====
Team 1	Score	Team 2
8 August 2006
Outrup BK	1–2	Ringkøbing IF
9 August 2006
Hammel GF	0–5	Aarhus Fremad
Vejlby IK	0–0 (a.e.t.) (4–5 p)	Vildbjerg SF
IF Lyseng	1–2	Varde IF
Kjellerup IF	4–1	Viby IF
Holstebro BK	1–2	Brabrand IF

==== South ====
Team 1	Score	Team 2
9 August 2006
Rødding IF	1–10	Søhus BK
Sønderborg Fremad	0–1	OKS
Fredericia fF	1–2	Næsby BK
Sanderum BK	1–2	Marstal IF
Starup UIF	2–3	FC Fyn
Fjordager IF	4–0	Stige BK
Svendborg fB	2–4	FC Fredericia

=== East ===
Team 1	Score	Team 2
9 August 2006
FK Sydsjælland 05	0–3	Værløse BK
BK Fix	2–4	FC Bornholm/Viking
Ringsted IF	3–1	BK Viktoria
Vordingborg IF	0–2	B.93
Husum BK	0–1	Brønshøj BK
Lundtofte BK	3–2	Dragør BK
Sorø IF Freja	1–0	BK Avarta
Svebølle B&I	2–1	Nakskov BK
Trundholm FC	0–2	Herfølge BK
Ørslev GIF	2–4	IF Skjold Birkerød
Gladsaxe-Hero BK	1–5	Glostrup FK
Listrup UIF	2–3	Holbæk B&I
Solrød FC	4–6	BK Frem Sakskøbing
Elite 3000 Helsingør	2–0	Slagelse B&I
Skovshoved IF	0–2	Fremad Amager
Herlev IF	1–3	FC Roskilde
Sundby BK	0–4	Lolland-Falster Alliancen
Vanløse IF	1–0	Kalundborg GB
Ølstykke FC	1–1 (a.e.t.) (4–5 p)	Hellerup IK
Næstved BK	0–2	AB
Stenløse BK	0–6	BK Skjold
Hvidovre IF	1–1 (a.e.t.) (1–4 p)	BK Frem
15 August 2006
Østerbro IF	2–1	BK Søllerød-Vedbæk

== Second round ==
In second round competed 44 winning teams from first round, 4 teams from 2005–06 Danish 1st Division (no. 1 to 4) and 8 teams from 2005–06 Danish Superliga (no. 5 to 12).

The draw were held on 10 August 2006.

Team 1	Score	Team 2
22 August 2006
Ringkøbing IF	1–3	Skive IK
23 August 2006
FC Bornholm/Viking	1–3	Glostrup FK
Marstal IF	1–2	Kjellerup IF
Søhus BK	1–5	Thisted FC
OKS	0–2	Vejle BK
Brabrand IF	1–2	Esbjerg fB
Næsby BK	0–0 (a.e.t.) (3–4 p)	Aarhus Fremad
Varde IF	1–4	SønderjyskE
Vildbjerg SF	0–13	AC Horsens
Aars IK	3–5	AGF
Nibe BK	0–9	Kolding FC
Svebølle B&I	0–3	Brønshøj BK
Herfølge BK	0–1	BK Frem
Lundtofte BK	2–5	BK Skjold
Vanløse IF	1–2	FC Nordsjælland
BK Frem Sakskøbing	0–8	Lyngby BK
IF Skjold Birkerød	1–2	Lolland-Falster Alliancen
Elite 3000 Helsingør	2–2 (a.e.t.) (9–8 p)	B.93
Værløse BK	0–8	FC Fyn
Sorø IF Freja	2–1	AB 70
FC Roskilde	4–2	Hellerup IK
Frederikshavn fI	3–2	FC Hjørring
FC Fredericia	4–2	AaB
Holbæk B&I	3–1	Køge BK
30 August 2006
Fjordager IF	1–10	Randers FC
Ringsted IF	0–3	AB
31 August 2006
FC Midtjylland	3–0	Silkeborg IF
6 September 2006
Østerbro IF	5–4	Fremad Amager

== Third round ==
In third round compete 28 winning teams from second round and 4 teams from 2005–06 Danish Superliga (no. 1 to 4).

The draw were held on 24 August 2006.

Team 1	Score	Team 2
20 September 2006
Kjellerup IF	2–3	Holbæk B&I
Thisted FC	1–1 (a.e.t.) (0–3 p)	F.C. Copenhagen
Aarhus Fremad	0–2	FC Midtjylland
FC Roskilde	1–2	AGF
Østerbro IF	0–7	Viborg FF
Elite 3000 Helsingør	2–5	Randers FC
Sorø IF Freja	0–8	Lyngby BK
BK Skjold	0–5	Kolding FC
Vejle BK	3–3 (a.e.t.) (3–4 p)	AC Horsens
AB	0–2	SønderjyskE
Odense BK	1–0	FC Nordsjælland
Brønshøj BK	0–3	Brøndby IF
Glostrup FK	3–2	Lolland-Falster Alliancen
Frederikshavn fI	1–0	FC Fyn
Skive IK	2–3	FC Fredericia
27 September 2006
BK Frem	0–1	Esbjerg fB

== Fourth round ==
The draw were held on 21 September 2006.

Team 1	Score	Team 2
8 November 2006
AGF	1–2	Randers FC
FC Fredericia	1–2	AC Horsens
Odense BK	1–0	Brøndby IF
Lyngby BK	5–1	Kolding FC
Frederikshavn fI	0–2	FC Midtjylland
Holbæk B&I	4–2	SønderjyskE
F.C. Copenhagen	3–1	Esbjerg fB
Glostrup FK	2–3	Viborg FF

== Quarter-finals ==
The draw were held on 9 November 2006.

Team 1	Score	Team 2
12 April 2007
Holbæk B&I	1–6	Viborg FF
Lyngby BK	1–0 (a.e.t.)	AC Horsens
Odense BK	1–0	Randers FC
FC Midtjylland	2–3 (a.e.t.)	F.C. Copenhagen

== Semi-finals ==
The semi finals will be played on home and away basis.

The draw were held on 13 April 2007. The legs were played on 25 April and 2 May 2007.

Team 1	Agg.	Team 2	1st leg	2nd leg
Lyngby BK	2–7	F.C. Copenhagen	2–3	0–4
Odense BK	3–2	Viborg FF	1–2	2–0

== Final ==
17 May 2007
15:00 CEST

F.C. Copenhagen	1–2	Odense BK
Hutchinson 15'		Borre 36'; Bechara 49'

Parken Stadium, Copenhagen
Attendance: 30,013
Referee: Anders Hermansen

== See also ==
- Football in Denmark
- 2006–07 in Danish football
- 2006–07 Danish Superliga
- 2006–07 Danish 1st Division
- 2006–07 Danish 2nd Divisions
