= Jashar Beluli =

Danish footballer of Albanian/Kosovo origin (born 2004)

Personal information
- Date of birth: 7 June 2004 (age 22)
- Place of birth: Silkeborg, Denmark
- Height: 1.88 m (6 ft 2 in)
- Position: Forward

Team information
- Current team: Aarhus Fremad
- Number: 70

Youth career
- Aabenraa BK
- –2017: SønderjyskE
- 2017–2021: Vejle
- 2021–2024: Horsens

Senior career*
Years	Team	Apps	(Gls)
2023–2024	Horsens	15	(1)
2024–	Aarhus Fremad	39	(7)

International career
2020	Albania U16	2	(0)
- * Club domestic league appearances and goals as of 15:32, 12 August 2026 (UTC)

Jashar Beluli (born 7 June 2004) is a Danish footballer of Kosovon Albanian origin, who plays as a forward for Danish 1st Division club Aarhus Fremad.

== Club career ==
=== AC Horsens ===
Beluli started playing football in Aabenraa before SønderjyskE brought him into a joint talent team from U12, and he switched to Vejle Boldklub as an U14 player. In October 2020, he signed a contract until June 2023 with Vejle, but ended up leaving the club in September 2021 to join AC Horsens.

Beluli started on Horsens U19 team, but also got his first team debut in his first season when he came off the bench in a Danish 1st Division match against Nykøbing FC on 18 March 2022. In July 2023, Beluli was permanently promoted to the first team squad.

On 30 May 2024, Horsens confirmed that Beluli left the club at the end of the season as his contract had expired and was not extended.

=== Aarhus Fremad ===
On 13 September 2024, it was confirmed that Beluli had signed with Danish 2nd Division club Aarhus Fremad.
