= Claus Christiansen (footballer, born 1972) =

Danish footballer and manager (born 1972)

Personal information
- Full name: Claus Friis Christiansen
- Date of birth: 27 March 1972 (age 54)
- Place of birth: Denmark
- Height: 1.77 m (5 ft 10 in)
- Position: Midfielder

Senior career*
Years	Team	Apps	(Gls)
- Aabyhøj IF
1990–1995	AGF	98	(5)
1995–1996	Randers Freja		
1996–1998	Herning Fremad		
1998–2000	FC Mamer		

Managerial career
- 2002–2003: AGF (reserves)
- 2004–2005: FC Horsens
- 2006–2007: Brabrand IF
- 2008–2013: FC Skanderborg
- 2013–2014: TST Fodbold
- 2014–2017: Aarhus Fremad
- 2017–2019: Silkeborg KFUM
- * Club domestic league appearances and goals

Claus Friis Christiansen (born 27 March 1972) is a Danish former professional football player and now manager.

== Career ==
In 2017 Christiansen became manager of Silkeborg KFUM. He previously managed Aarhus Fremad.
