= 1996–97 Danish 1st Division =

52nd season of Danish 1st Division

Danish 1st Division
- Season: 1996–97

The 1996–97 Danish 1st Division season was the 52nd season of the Danish 1st Division league championship and the 11th consecutive as a second tier competition governed by the Danish Football Association.

The division-champion and runner-up promoted to the 1997–98 Danish Superliga. The teams in the 13th to 16th spots relegated to the 1997–98 Danish 2nd Division.

== Table ==
Pos	Team	Pld	W	D	L	GF	GA	GD	Pts	Promotion or relegation
1	Ikast fS (C, P)	30	18	8	4	61	37	+24	62	Promotion to Danish Superliga
2	Aarhus Fremad (P)	30	18	5	7	73	44	+29	59	Promotion to Danish Superliga
3	Svendborg fB	30	16	5	9	56	38	+18	53	
4	Glostrup IF 32	30	15	7	8	53	33	+20	52	
5	Herning Fremad	30	13	10	7	45	37	+8	49	
6	Næstved IF	30	15	4	11	54	50	+4	49	
7	Esbjerg fB	30	13	5	12	43	40	+3	44	
8	B 93	30	11	9	10	45	40	+5	42	
9	Ølstykke FC	30	12	6	12	52	48	+4	42	
10	RB 1906	30	11	9	10	40	48	−8	42	
11	BK Fremad Amager	30	9	11	10	37	42	−5	38	
12	Køge BK	30	10	6	14	55	66	−11	36	
13	FC Fredericia (R)	30	7	8	15	41	56	−15	29	Relegation to Danish 2nd Divisions
14	Brønshøj BK (R)	30	5	9	16	40	66	−26	24	Relegation to Danish 2nd Divisions
15	Haderslev FK (R)	30	5	7	18	36	56	−20	22	Relegation to Danish 2nd Divisions
16	BK Avarta (R)	30	5	5	20	36	66	−30	20	Relegation to Danish 2nd Divisions

Rules for classification: 1) points; 2) goal difference; 3) number of goals scored.
(C) Champions; (P) Promoted; (R) Relegated

== Top goalscorers ==
Position	Player	Club	Goals
1	Søren Hermansen	Aarhus Fremad	25
2	Thomas Maale	Ølstykke FC	24
3	Christian Lundberg	Ikast fS	18
4	Thomas Ambrosius	Herning Fremad	17
-	Gregers Ulrich	Aarhus Fremad	17
6	Lars Hansen	IfS/HFK	15
-	Claus Frandsen	Glostrup IF 32	15
8	Ulrik Balling	Næstved IF	14
9	Ugo de Lorenzo	BK Avarta	12
-	Martin B. Larsen	Svendborg fB	12
-	Roman Func	Brønshøj BK	12

== See also ==
- 1996–97 in Danish football
- 1996–97 Danish Superliga
