= Emil Ousager =

Danish footballer (born 1987)

Personal information
- Full name: Emil Bekker Ousager
- Date of birth: 19 July 1987 (age 39)
- Place of birth: Odense, Denmark
- Height: 1.89 m (6 ft 2 in)
- Position: Goalkeeper

Youth career
- ? – 2007: OB

Senior career*
Years	Team	Apps	(Gls)
2007–2009	Randers FC	0	(0)
2009–2011	OB	1	(0)
2010	→ Næsby BK (loan)		
2011–2014	AGF	16	(0)
2014–2015	OB	3	(0)

International career
2003	Denmark U17	2	(0)
2005–2006	Denmark U19	6	(0)
2006	Denmark U20	2	(0)
- * Club domestic league appearances and goals

Emil Bekker Ousager (born 19 July 1987) is a Danish former professional football player in the goalkeeper position.

Ousager retired in the summer 2015 at the age of 27.

== Honours ==
OB

- Danish Cup: 2006–07
