= 2009 UEFA European Under-21 Championship qualification play-offs =

The qualification play-offs for the 2009 UEFA European Under-21 Championship took place from 10 October to 15 October 2008. The ten group winners and four best runners-up from the qualifying group stage were drawn together in pairs in order to determine the seven teams that joined hosts Sweden at the 2009 UEFA European Under-21 Championship.

== Matches ==
Team 1	Agg.	Team 2	1st leg	2nd leg
Germany	2–1	France	1–1	1–0
Denmark	0–2	Serbia	0–1	0–1
Turkey	1–2	Belarus	1–0	0–2
Austria	3–3 (4–2 p)	Finland	2–1	1–2
Wales	4–5	England	2–3	2–2
Italy	3–1	Israel	0–0	3–1
Switzerland	3–4	Spain	2–1	1–3 (aet)

=== First leg ===
10 October 2008
18:00

Austria	2–1	Finland
Saurer 10'; Klein 13'	Report	Hetemaj 63'

Waldstadion, Pasching
Referee: Aleksandar Stavrev (Macedonia)

10 October 2008
18:30

Turkey	1–0	Belarus
Yıldırım 10'	Report

Mardan Sports Complex, Antalya
Referee: Peter Sippel (Germany)

10 October 2008
19:00

Germany	1–1	France
Dejagah 14'	Report	Kaboul 23'

Stadion Magdeburg, Magdeburg
Referee: Svein Oddvar Moen (Norway)

10 October 2008
20:45

Wales	2–3	England
Church 13', 44'	Report	Wheater 19'; Johnson 35'; Agbonlahor 61'

Ninian Park, Cardiff
Attendance: 10,500
Referee: Cristian Balaj (Romania)

11 October 2008
16:00

Italy	0–0	Israel
	Report

Stadio del Conero, Ancona
Referee: Duarte Gomes (Portugal)

11 October 2008
16:35

Denmark	0–1	Serbia
	Report	Đorđević 83'

Aalborg Stadion, Aalborg
Referee: Zsolt Szabo (Hungary)

11 October 2008
20:00

Switzerland	2–1	Spain
Vonlanthen 27'; Nikçi 51'	Report	Busquets 18'

Stadion Brügglifeld, Aarau
Referee: Serge Gumienny (Belgium)

=== Second leg ===
14 October 2008
18:00

Finland	2–1 (a.e.t.)	Austria
Vasara 81', 90'	Report	Stanković 26'
Penalties
Sparv (penalty scored); Aho (penalty scored); Kokko (penalty scored); Hakola (penalty scored)	4 – 2	(penalty missed) Stanković; (penalty scored) Beichler; (penalty scored) Kavlak; (penalty missed) Madl

Veritas Stadion, Turku
Referee: Alan Kelly (Republic of Ireland)

3–3 on aggregate. Finland won 4–2 on penalties.

14 October 2008
18:00

Belarus	2–0	Turkey
Sivakov 39'; Shytaw 53'	Report

City Stadium, Borisov
Referee: Stefan Johannesson (Sweden)

Belarus won 2–1 on aggregate.

14 October 2008
20:45

England	2–2	Wales
Huddlestone 13'; Vokes 35' (o.g.)	Report	Ramsey 24'; Church 28'

Villa Park, Birmingham
Attendance: 23,812
Referee: Kevin Blom (Netherlands)

England won 5–4 on aggregate.

14 October 2008
21:30

Spain	3–1 (a.e.t.)	Switzerland
Xisco 51'; Sisi 90+5'; García 112'	Report	Gashi 25'

Estadio Francisco Artés Carrasco, Lorca
Referee: Cüneyt Çakır (Turkey)

Spain won 4–3 on aggregate.

15 October 2008
18:00

Serbia	1–0	Denmark
Milinković 74'	Report

Partizan Stadium, Belgrade
Referee: César Muñiz Fernández (Spain)

Serbia won 2–0 on aggregate.

15 October 2008
19:00

France	0–1	Germany
	Report	Höwedes 90'

Stade Municipal Saint-Symphorien, Metz
Referee: Paolo Tagliavento (Italy)

Germany won 2–1 on aggregate.

15 October 2008
20:15

Israel	1–3	Italy
Tamuz 54'	Report	Balotelli 4', 25'; Abate 75'

Bloomfield Stadium, Tel Aviv
Referee: Tony Chapron (France)

Italy won 3–1 on aggregate.
