= Viggo Jensen (footballer, born 1947) =

Danish footballer and manager

Personal information
- Full name: Viggo Biehl Jensen
- Date of birth: 15 September 1947 (age 79)
- Place of birth: Esbjerg, Denmark
- Positions: Defender; midfielder

Team information
- Current team: Silkeborg IF

Youth career
- –1965: Esbjerg fB

Senior career*
Years	Team	Apps	(Gls)
1965–1969	Esbjerg fB	29	
1970–1973	B 1909	154	
1973–1974	FC Bayern Munich	5	(0)
1974–1978	SpVgg Fürth	102	(5)
1978–1979	Odense Boldklub		
1980	B 1909		

International career
1971–1973	Denmark	8	(0)

Managerial career
- 1981: Ullerslev Boldklub
- 1982–1987: Svendborg fB
- 1987–1992: Silkeborg IF
- 1989–1992: Denmark U21
- 1992–1993: Malmö FF
- 1994: Odense Boldklub
- 1995: Viborg FF
- 1995–1997: Odense Boldklub
- 1997: Aarhus Fremad
- 1997–2002: Esbjerg fB
- 2002–2006: Silkeborg IF
- 2007: Estonia
- 2008: FC Fyn
- 2011: Vejle Boldklub
- 2012–2013: Silkeborg IF
- * Club domestic league appearances and goals

Viggo Biehl Jensen (born 15 September 1947) is a Danish former football player and manager. He was most recently the manager of Danish Superliga side Silkeborg IF.

As a player, Jensen played for Danish sides B 1909, Esbjerg fB, and Odense Boldklub and the German sides FC Bayern Munich and SpVgg Fürth. He played for the Denmark national football team in 8 games from 1971 to 1973.

As a coach, he was named Danish manager of the Year in 1988. He managed the Denmark national under-21 football team from 1989 to 1992 and Malmö FF 1992–1994. In July 2007 he was announced new coach of Estonia a job he held until November 2007, when he was replaced by Tarmo Rüütli.
