= Simon Bækgaard =

Danish footballer (born 1999)

Personal information
- Full name: Simon Bækgaard
- Date of birth: 14 October 1999 (age 27)
- Place of birth: Denmark
- Height: 1.79 m (5 ft 10 in)
- Position: Midfielder

Team information
- Current team: Aarhus Fremad
- Number: 8

Youth career
- Spangsbjerg IF
- 2012–2018: Esbjerg fB

Senior career*
Years	Team	Apps	(Gls)
2018–2022	Esbjerg fB	42	(1)
2020	→ Aarhus Fremad (loan)	7	(2)
2022–2024	Fredericia	50	(0)
2024–	Aarhus Fremad	56	(2)
- * Club domestic league appearances and goals as of 2 June 2026

Simon Bækgaard (born 14 October 1999) is a Danish professional football player who plays for Aarhus Fremad in the Danish 1st Division.

== Career ==
=== Esbjerg fB ===
Bækgaard joined Esbjerg fB as a youth player from Spangsbjerg IF.

On 3 September 2017, Bækgaard got his official debut for Esbjerg in a Danish 1st Division game against Fremad Amager, where he played 62 minutes. In October 2017 Bækgaard got his contract extended once again, this time until June 2021, having already signed a 1-year contract thee months earlier. He played two league games in total in the 2017/18 season.

Bækgaard was permanently promoted into the first team squad from the 2018–19 season. In September 2018, Bækgaard scored a hattrick in the second round of the Danish Cup against Hørsholm IK. On 7 November 2018, he appeared as a substitute against fellow Superliga club SønderjyskE in the cup. He ended the season with four total appearances for Esbjerg.

Bækgaard failed to make any appearances for Esbjerg during first half of the 2019–20 season and was as a result loaned out to Danish third tier club Aarhus Fremad on 31 January 2020 for the remainder of the season. He made his debut on 7 March 2020, playing all 90 minutes against Dalum IF in a 2–0 win. On 24 June, he scored a brace as Fremad won 5–0 over Brønshøj.

After a terrible season at Esbjerg, which ended with relegation to the Danish 2nd Division, it was confirmed at the end of May 2022, that Bækgaard would leave the club at the end of the season, where his contract would expire.

=== FC Fredericia ===
On 30 May 2022 it was confirmed, that Bækgaard had signed a two-year deal with Danish 1st Division club FC Fredericia.

=== Return to Aarhus Fremad ===
On June 20, 2024, Aarhus Fremad confirmed that Bækgaard had signed with the club. Bækgaard had previously been associated with the club on a loan deal back in 2020.
