= Lars Jensen (footballer) =

Danish footballer (born 1975)

Personal information
- Date of birth: 4 July 1975 (age 50)
- Place of birth: Denmark
- Height: 1.85 m (6 ft 1 in)
- Position: Defender

Senior career*
Years	Team	Apps	(Gls)
1999–2003	AC Horsens		
2003–2004	Holstein Kiel	9	(0)
2004–2006	Jahn Regensburg	41	(0)
2006–2008	AC Horsens	9	(0)
- * Club domestic league appearances and goals

Lars Jensen (born 4 July 1975) is a Danish former professional football defender. He ended his career in the Danish Superliga side AC Horsens.

Jensen previously played for Holstein Kiel and Jahn Regensburg in the German Regionalliga.
