= Kim Poulsen =

Danish football manager

Personal information
- Date of birth: 22 March 1959 (age 67)
- Place of birth: Sønderborg, Denmark

Managerial career
- Years: Team
- 1987–1995: Aarhus Fremad
- 1996–1997: Horsens
- 1998: Aarhus Fremad
- 1999: Horsens
- 1999–2001: Viborg
- 2002: Randers Freja
- 2003: Singapore U19
- 2004: Singapore U23
- 2005: Armed Forces
- 2006–2007: Vejle Boldklub
- 2007–2010: Næstved
- 2010–2011: FC Hjørring
- 2011–2012: Tanzania U19
- 2012–2014: Tanzania
- 2014–2015: Silkeborg IF
- 2016–2018: Tanzania (head of development)
- 2018–2021: FC Sønderborg
- 2021–2022: Tanzania

Kim Poulsen (born 22 March 1959) is a Danish football manager and former amateur player.

== Managerial career ==
=== Early career ===
Poulsen only played amateur football as an active player. As a football manager, he gained national recognition when he won promotion with Danish club Aarhus Fremad five times in only nine years, from 1987 to 1995, and reached the Danish Superliga with the club. Between 1996 and 1997, Poulsen managed AC Horsens before moving back to Aarhus Fremad in 1998. He managed AC Horsens again in 1999, before being appointed manager of Viborg FF the same year. Under Poulsen, Viborg FF turned fully professional and won the 1999–2000 Danish Cup, as well as the 2000 Danish Super Cup. In October 2001, Poulsen was sacked from his position in Viborg. He would then go on to manage Randers Freja.

=== Singapore and return to Denmark ===
In December 2002, Poulsen moved to Singapore. Here he managed the under-18 team of the Singapore national football team, the Young Lions, and the Singapore Armed Forces FC. Afterwards, Poulsen moved back to Denmark and joined Vejle Boldklub in January 2006 on a three-year contract. He was sacked by the club in April 2007, and joined Næstved BK in July 2007.

In June 2010, Poulsen was named new manager of FC Hjørring. He left the club in April 2011 after being named as new coach of the Tanzania national under-21 team. In May 2012, Poulsen was promoted to become manager of the Tanzania national team, replacing fellow Dane Jan Børge Poulsen.

=== Silkeborg ===
On 8 December 2014, Poulsen was hired as a new head coach in Silkeborg IF and signed a two-year contract. With the club struggling in the Superliga, he stated that he was no witch doctor but was optimistic in his mission to save Silkeborg from relegation. Despite his efforts, the clubsuffered relegation following the 2014–15 season. On 30 September 2015, Poulsen was dismissed by Silkeborg with the side placed 8th in the Danish second tier table. Poulsen was succeeded by Peter Sørensen.

=== Tanzania and Sønderborg ===
On 1 March 2016, Poulsen was hired as head of national football development for the Tanzania national team, which he described as a "dream job".

After two years in Tanzania, Poulsen returned to Denmark and his hometown of Sønderborg where he was appointed manager of FC Sønderborg on a three-year contract.

In February 2021 Poulsen resigned from his position at Sønderborg in order to take up the job as manager of the Tanzania national team once again.

== Honours ==
Viborg FF

- Danish Cup: 1999–00
- Danish Super Cup: 2000
