= Martin Borre =

Danish footballer (born 1979)

Personal information
- Date of birth: 27 March 1979 (age 47)
- Place of birth: Denmark
- Height: 1.84 m (6 ft 1/2 in)
- Position: Midfielder

Youth career
- Albertslund IF
- Brøndby

Senior career*
Years	Team	Apps	(Gls)
2000–2003	Køge Boldklub	75	(11)
2003–2007	OB	99	(9)
2007–2008	Start	20	(3)
2008–2011	Vejle	56	(1)

International career
1998	Denmark U21	2	(0)
- * Club domestic league appearances and goals

Martin Borre (born 27 March 1979) is a Danish former professional footballer who played as a midfielder.

== Honours ==
OB

- Danish Cup: 2006–07
