= Thomas Nørgaard (footballer) =

Danish footballer (born 1987)

Personal information
- Full name: Thomas Nørgaard
- Date of birth: 7 January 1987 (age 39)
- Place of birth: Silkeborg, Denmark
- Position: Goalkeeper

Team information
- Current team: Silkeborg IF (goalkeeper coach)

Senior career*
Years	Team	Apps	(Gls)
2008–2009	Silkeborg IF	1	(0)
2010–2011	Skive IK		
2011–2013	Aarhus Fremad		
2013–2019	Silkeborg IF	115	(0)
- * Club domestic league appearances and goals

Thomas Nørgaard (born 7 January 1987) is a Danish retired professional footballer. He is currently the goalkeeper coach of Silkeborg IF.

== Coaching career ==
After retiring at the end of the 2018/19 season, Nørgaard became goalkeeper coach of Silkeborg IF.
