= Morten Beck Guldsmed =

Danish footballer (born 1988)

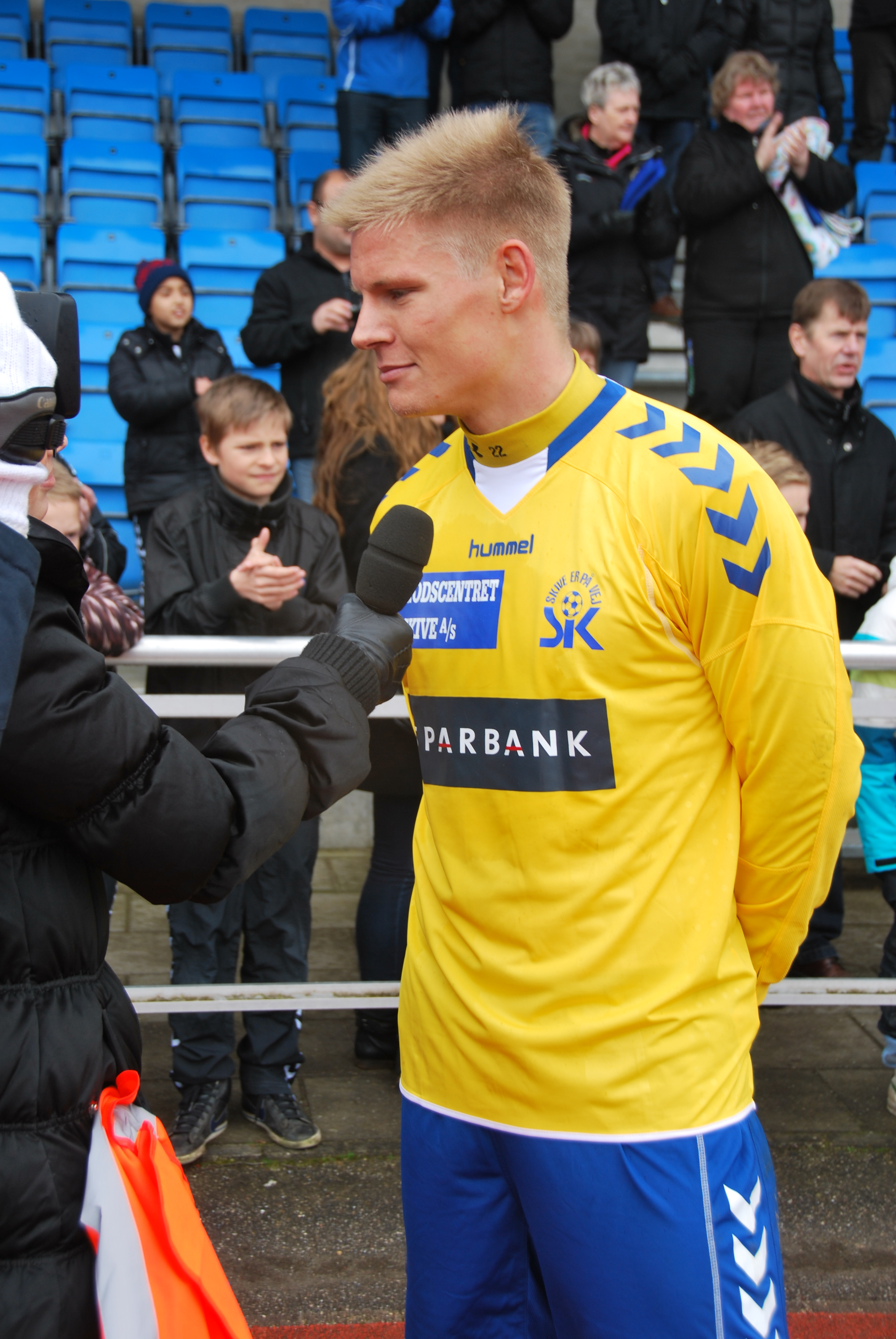
- Morten Beck Andersen in April 2012

Personal information
- Date of birth: 2 January 1988 (age 38)
- Place of birth: Denmark
- Height: 1.90 m (6 ft 3 in)
- Position: Forward

Youth career
- AGF

Senior career*
Years	Team	Apps	(Gls)
2007–2009	AGF	1	(0)
2009–2013	Skive	103	(35)
2013–2015	Silkeborg	59	(19)
2015–2016	Hobro	13	(0)
2016–2017	KR	21	(5)
2017	Fredericia	13	(6)
2017–2019	Viborg	27	(7)
2019–2021	FH	27	(10)
2021	→ ÍA (loan)	9	(0)
2022–2023	Skive	17	(2)
- * Club domestic league appearances and goals as of 16:42, 28 January 2023 (UTC)

Morten Beck Guldsmed (born 2 January 1988) is a Danish professional football player.

== Career ==
=== AGF ===
A product of AGF's youth academy, Beck Andersen was part of AGF's talented 1988 cohort, which included notable players such as Michael Lumb, Frederik Krabbe, and others who had secured the under-17 league title in 2003. He became the third member of his family to represent the club. His father, Per Beck Andersen, was a part of the title-winning team in 1986, while his brother, Martin Beck Andersen, made six appearances for the first team during the 2003–04 season.

After playing matches for AGF's reserve team in the Denmark Series, Beck Andersen made his debut for the first team on 18 August 2007, in an away match against Brøndby in the Danish Superliga, which ended with a 1–0 victory for AGF. In November 2007, Beck Andersen signed a contract, marking his promotion to the first team. Initially, the contract lasted for six months, reflecting the club's cautious approach towards committing to a long-term deal for the 19-year-old striker, contingent upon meeting expectations. After the initial six months, AGF offered him a new contract, this time as a full-time professional. Despite having only played a single Superliga match during that period, the new contract spanned a year.

Twice within half a year, AGF informed Beck Andersen that the club no longer desired his services and would not invest further in him. Beck Andersen, along with three other players who received similar messages, continued training with the club. However, two of them later departed, leaving Beck Andersen behind. Despite being told he could find a new club, Beck Andersen remained with AGF until the club announced the termination of their collaboration in June 2009. Despite not having a contract, he was allowed to train with AGF until he secured a new club. Subsequently, the 21-year-old Beck Andersen sought opportunities in Belgium to pursue his football career. However, he failed to secure any contracts with Belgian clubs.

=== Skive ===
On 31 July 2009, Beck Andersen signed a two-year contract with Skive. Prior to this, he had been training with the club and showcasing his skills in friendly matches, impressing them enough to secure a role aimed at replacing Lasse Ankjær.

On 20 March 2013, Beck Andersen extended his contract with Skive until 2015, marking his transition to full-time professionalism. In May 2013, as Skive's leading goal scorer, Beck Andersen, expressed his intention to depart from the club. Despite his impressive tally of 18 goals during the season, Skive faced relegation to the third-tier Danish 2nd Division. He made a total of 103 league appearances for Skive during his four seasons at the club, during which he scored 35 league goals.

== Style of play ==
Beck Andersen, a striker, gained respect for his adept hold-up play, heading ability, and aggressive style of play while coming through the ranks of AGF.
