= Frederik Krabbe =

Danish footballer (born 1988)

Personal information
- Date of birth: 10 March 1988 (age 38)
- Place of birth: Aabyhøj, Aarhus, Denmark
- Height: 1.83 m (6 ft 0 in)
- Position: Right back

Youth career
- Aabyhøj IF
- 2003–2005: AGF

Senior career*
Years	Team	Apps	(Gls)
2005–2011	AGF	131	(5)
2011–2013	Lyngby	35	(1)
2013–2015	Arendal	32	(3)
2015–2019	Hvidovre	60	(5)
2019	→ HIK (loan)	12	(0)
2020–2021	HIK	24	(1)
Total		294	(15)

International career
2004	Denmark U16	3	(1)
2004–2005	Denmark U17	15	(0)
2005–2006	Denmark U18	4	(0)
2006–2007	Denmark U19	11	(0)
2007–2008	Denmark U20	4	(0)
2007–2010	Denmark U21	11	(0)
- * Club domestic league appearances and goals

Frederik Krabbe (born 10 March 1988) is a Danish former professional footballer who played as a right-back.

== Career ==
Krabbe started playing professional football with AGF in 2005, initially playing as a centre-back. Due to injuries to teammates during the 2007–08 season, he transitioned to the right-back position permanently. Krabbe was part of AGF's talented 1988 cohort, which included notable players such as Michael Lumb, Morten Beck Andersen, and others who had secured the under-17 league title in 2003.

However, Krabbe faced adversity in July 2010 when he suffered a serious injury during a friendly match against AaB, sidelining him for over six months. On 24 May 2011, Krabbe's contract with AGF expired and one month later he signed a two-year contract with Lyngby Boldklub.

In July 2013, Krabbe signed a contract with Norwegian Second Division club Arendal. He returned to Denmark in December 2014, signing a two-and-a-half-year contract with Hvidovre.

On 13 August 2019, Krabbe was loaned out to Danish 2nd Division club HIK for the rest of 2019 from Hvidovre. In January 2020 it was reported, that Krabbe had terminated his contract with Hvidovre and would continue at HIK.

On 28 May 2021, Krabbe announced his retirement from football.
