= Henrik Bundgaard =

Danish footballer (born 1975)

Personal information
- Date of birth: 20 March 1975 (age 51)
- Place of birth: Denmark
- Height: 1.87 m (6 ft 2 in)
- Position: Goalkeeper

Youth career
- Aabyhøj IF
- FC Fredericia

Senior career*
Years	Team	Apps	(Gls)
19??–1995	FC Fredericia		
1995–2004	Aarhus Fremad		
- → AGF (loan)
2004–2005	Brabrand IF		
2005–2008	AGF		
2007	→ AC Horsens (loan)	0	(0)
2008–2012	Aarhus Fremad		
- * Club domestic league appearances and goals as of 27 December 2007

Henrik Bundgaard (born 20 March 1975) is a Danish former professional football goalkeeper.
