= Michael Vester =

Danish footballer (born 1988)

Personal information
- Date of birth: 4 May 1988 (age 38)
- Place of birth: Tilst, Denmark
- Height: 1.77 m (5 ft 10 in)
- Position: Forward

Youth career
- –2001: TST Tilst
- 2001–2005: AGF

Senior career*
Years	Team	Apps	(Gls)
2005–2010	AGF	1	(0)
2010–2013	Aarhus Fremad		

International career
2004	Denmark U16	3	(2)
2003–2005	Denmark U17	16	(4)
2005	Denmark U18	1	(2)
2005–2007	Denmark U19	6	(0)
- * Club domestic league appearances and goals

Michael Vester (born 4 May 1988) is a Danish former professional footballer who played as a forward.

== Career ==
Vester joined the AGF youth academy from TST Tilst, and was renowned as a goal scorer in his early career. He signed his first contract on 15 July 2003, keeping him at the club until 2006.

He made his professional debut on 16 October 2005, coming on as a substitute in the 85th minute for Christer George in a 3–1 loss to OB in the Danish Superliga.

On 15 July 2010, Vester and AGF decided to terminate his contract by mutual consent. He joined Aarhus Fremad the same day.
