= 2006–07 Danish 2nd Divisions =

Danish 2nd Divisions
- Season: 2006–07

The 2006–07 season in Danish 2nd Division was divided into two groups. The two winners, Lolland-Falster Alliancen and Skive IK, were promoted to the 2007–08 Danish 1st Division, together with the winner of a promotion game, Hvidovre IF, between the two runners-up.

Second squad teams were not eligible for promotion or allowed to play in the promotion game.

== East group ==
Pos	Team	Pld	W	D	L	GF	GA	GD	Pts	Promotion or relegation
1	LFA (C, P)	26	17	4	5	61	31	+30	55	Promotion to Danish 1st Division
2	Brøndby 2	26	17	1	8	52	33	+19	52	
3	Hvidovre IF (P)	26	15	6	5	46	22	+24	51	Qualification to Promotion game
4	FC Roskilde	26	13	7	6	42	36	+6	46	
5	KB (FCK 2)	26	13	5	8	59	41	+18	44	
6	B.93	26	12	6	8	63	37	+26	42	
7	Slagelse BI	26	11	5	10	50	45	+5	38	
8	Holbæk B&I	26	11	5	10	45	40	+5	38	
9	Greve Fodbold	26	8	4	14	40	50	−10	28	
10	Brønshøj BK	26	6	7	13	44	56	−12	25	
11	Skovlunde IF	26	6	8	12	32	46	−14	26	
12	Glostrup FK	26	6	5	15	25	50	−25	23	
13	Stenløse BK	26	5	7	14	27	59	−32	22	
14	AB 70	26	4	6	16	31	71	−40	18	

Rules for classification: 1) points; 2) goal difference; 3) number of goals scored.
(C) Champions; (P) Promoted

== West group ==
Pos	Team	Pld	W	D	L	GF	GA	GD	Pts	Promotion or relegation
1	Skive IK (C, P)	26	16	5	5	54	25	+29	53	Promotion to Danish 1st Division
2	Ikast FS (FCM 2)	26	17	2	7	70	47	+23	53	
3	FC Fyn	26	15	4	7	68	51	+17	49	Qualification to Promotion game
4	Silkeborg 2 (R)	26	13	7	6	49	33	+16	46	Relegation to Denmark Series
5	Jetsmark IF	26	12	5	9	49	36	+13	41	
6	Esbjerg 2	26	12	3	11	56	45	+11	39	
7	Næsby BK	26	11	4	11	46	48	−2	37	
8	Hobro IK	26	11	5	10	50	47	+3	38	
9	Vejle 2 (R)	26	10	2	14	41	52	−11	32	Relegation to Denmark Series
10	FC Hjørring	26	8	6	12	42	49	−7	30	
11	Varde IF	26	9	2	15	32	45	−13	29	
12	Holstebro BK	26	8	4	14	43	60	−17	28	
13	BK Skjold	25	6	3	16	29	55	−26	21	
14	BK Søllerød-Vedbæk	26	6	2	18	36	72	−36	20	

Rules for classification: 1) points; 2) goal difference; 3) number of goals scored.
(C) Champions; (P) Promoted; (R) Relegated

== Promotion game ==
The two runners-up played a promotion game on a home and away basis.

Team 1	Agg.	Team 2	1st leg	2nd leg
Hvidovre IF	1–1 (ag)	FC Fyn	0–0	1–1 (aet)

=== First leg ===
16 June 2007
15:00

Hvidovre IF	0–0	FC Fyn

Hvidovre Stadion, Copenhagen

=== Second leg ===
23 June 2007
15:00

FC Fyn	1–1 (a.e.t.)	Hvidovre IF

Gillested Park, Odense
Attendance: 2,441
