= Anders Syberg =

Danish footballer (born 1988)

Personal information
- Date of birth: May 10, 1988 (age 38)
- Place of birth: Denmark
- Position: Midfielder

Youth career
- Brabrand IF
- Skovbakken
- AGF

Senior career*
Years	Team	Apps	(Gls)
2006–2008	AGF	1	(0)
2008–2009	Vestsjælland	7	(0)
2009–2010	Hobro		
2010–2011	Odder IGF		
2011–2012	Skovbakken		
2012–2014	GVI		
2014–2015	Herlev IF		
2015–2016	AB Tårnby		
- * Club domestic league appearances and goals as of 30 June 2020

Anders Syberg (born 10 May 1988) is a Danish former professional footballer, who played as a midfielder.

Syberg made his senior debut with AGF, making one league appearance for the club. In May 2008, Syberg moved to FC Vestsjælland. Syberg moved to Hobro IK in December 2009.
