= 2006–07 Danish 1st Division =

62nd season of Danish 1st Division

Danish 1st Division
- Season: 2006–07

The 2006–07 Danish 1st Division season was the 12th season of the Danish 1st Division league championship, governed by the Danish Football Association. It took place from the first match on July 29, 2006 to the final match on June 24, 2007.

The division-champion and runner-up were promoted to the 2007–08 Danish Superliga. The teams in the 14th, 15th and 16th places were divided between 2nd Division East and West, based on location.

== League standings ==
Pos	Team	Pld	W	D	L	GF	GA	GD	Pts	Promotion or relegation
1	Lyngby BK (C, P)	30	19	7	4	71	43	+28	64	Promotion to Danish Superliga
2	Aarhus GF (P)	30	18	5	7	58	38	+20	59	Promotion to Danish Superliga
3	SønderjyskE	30	16	5	9	57	34	+23	53	
4	FC Fredericia	30	16	5	9	50	37	+13	53	
5	BK Frem	30	14	8	8	48	43	+5	50	
6	Kolding FC	30	14	7	9	58	53	+5	49	
7	Køge BK (Note: Køge has been deducted 3 points for suspending payments.)	30	14	5	11	57	54	+3	44	
8	Næstved BK	30	12	7	11	54	35	+19	43	
9	Herfølge BK	30	12	7	11	54	41	+13	43	
10	AB Copenhagen	30	8	9	13	36	53	−17	33	
11	Aarhus Fremad	30	8	7	15	33	45	−12	31	
12	Ølstykke FC	30	8	6	16	36	41	−5	30	
13	Hellerup IK	30	6	11	13	33	49	−16	29	
14	Brabrand IF (R)	30	6	10	14	30	43	−13	28	Relegation to Danish 2nd Divisions
15	Thisted FC (R)	30	4	13	13	41	64	−23	25	Relegation to Danish 2nd Divisions
16	BK Fremad Amager (R)	30	6	6	18	35	78	−43	24	Relegation to Danish 2nd Divisions

Rules for classification: 1) points; 2) goal difference; 3) number of goals scored.
(C) Champions; (P) Promoted; (R) Relegated

== See also ==
- 2006–07 in Danish football
