= Fuglebakken KFUM Århus =

Danish association football club

Fuglebakken KFUM
- Full name: Fuglebakken KFUM Århus
- Founded: 2008; 18 years ago
- Ground: Højlyngen; Aarhus V, Denmark
- Chairman: Jesper Christensen
- Manager: Danni Ahmad Baddour
- League: Denmark Series
- 2025: Jutland Series 1 Group 1, 1st of 8 (promoted)
- Website: fuglebakkenkfum.dk
Home colours

Fuglebakken KFUM Århus (Danish: [ˈfuːləpɑkŋ̍]; commonly known as Fuglebakken), is an association football club based in Aarhus V, Denmark, that competes in the Denmark Series, the fifth tier of the Danish football league system. Founded in 2008 as the superstructure of KFUMs Boldklub Århus and Idrætsforeningen Hasle Fuglebakken (IFH), the club play at their home ground Højlyngen. Their colours are red and navy. Fuglebakken KFUM is affiliated to the local football association, DBU Jutland.
