= Aarhus Fremad =

Association football club in Denmark

- Full name: Aarhus Fremad Fodbold
- Founded: 12 June 1897; 129 years ago (foundation of sports club); 13 August 1947; 79 years ago (foundation of football department)
- Ground: Riisvangen Stadium, Aarhus N
- Capacity: 5,000 (100 seated)
- Chairman: Lars Kruse
- Manager: Mathias Damgaard
- League: Danish 1st Division
- 2025–26: Danish 1st Division, 8th of 12
- Website: www.aarhus-fremad.dk
| Home colours | Away colours |

Aarhus Fremad (Danish: [ˈɒːˌhuˀs ˈfʁɑmˌɛð], "Aarhus Forward") is an association football club located in Aarhus N, the northern part of Aarhus, Denmark. The club competes in the Danish 1st Division, the second tier of the Danish football league system. Aarhus Fremad competed in the lower divisions of Danish football until 1997, when the club miraculously reached the Danish Superliga after nine promotions in 13 seasons.

The club's home ground is the Riisvangen Stadium. The East Jutland club was originally formed as sports club in 1897, before being refounded as an independent association football club in 1947.

== History ==
=== Beginnings (1947–1973) ===
Aarhus Fodsportsforening "Fremad" was founded in 1897, but the football department was established in 1947 at the request of Wilhelm Østenfjeld, and admitted into the local football union, DBU Jutland, on 13 August 1947. The first chairman of the football department was Mozart Hansen, and a number of players in its inaugural season were also active participants in the club's athletics and handball departments, including Helge Paulsen (former chief executive of the Danish Handball Federation) and Jørgen Absalonsen (former chief executive of the Jutland Handball Federation and former head coach of the Denmark women's national handball team. Exact details about the first decades of the club's existence is sparse, except its location; the ground at Læssøesgades School close to Ingerslevs Boulevard, located in the Frederiksbjerg neighbourhood in the southern parts of Aarhus.

In 1969, Aarhus Fremad moved to its current home at Riisvangen Stadium in northern Aarhus after its former tenants IK Skovbakken had moved to Vejlby-Risskov Idrætscenter which was constructed in 1969. This came into place after Vorrevangens Boldklub had declined a move to Riisvangen. At this point, Aarhus Fremad's colours were white shirts and black shorts and socks.

As noted in the club's first newer club magazine, Kartoffelmos, which was first published in 1975: "In 1973 the club had a closed team, the 'villa team', which did not have dealings with other members of the club. The board mainly consisted of members of this villa team, and the other members played their planned matches without being involved with the board." At an extraordinary general assembly in December 1973, the entire villa team opted out of Aarhus Fremad, and took with them a large number of other active members. This virtually meant that the entire board had left the club, and that the remaining members were without a board and without any knowledge of running a football club. Nonetheless, club member Leo Meyer was appointed new chairman of the board in April 1974.

=== Rebuilding (1974–1984) ===
Following the fatal general assembly in December 1973, Aarhus Fremad only consisted of 9 members. The first team competed in Serie 5, the 10th tier division of Danish football, but did not have enough players to compete. The low membership resulted in lacking contributions, leaving the club in financial turmoil. the club did not have enough players to form a team. A new three-person board consisting of Søren Pank, Leo Meyer and Henning Tødt was elected to straighten out the financial situation. The board, suffering from the lacking contributions resulting from the low membership the year before, had to pay the debts and cover expenses left from the former board.

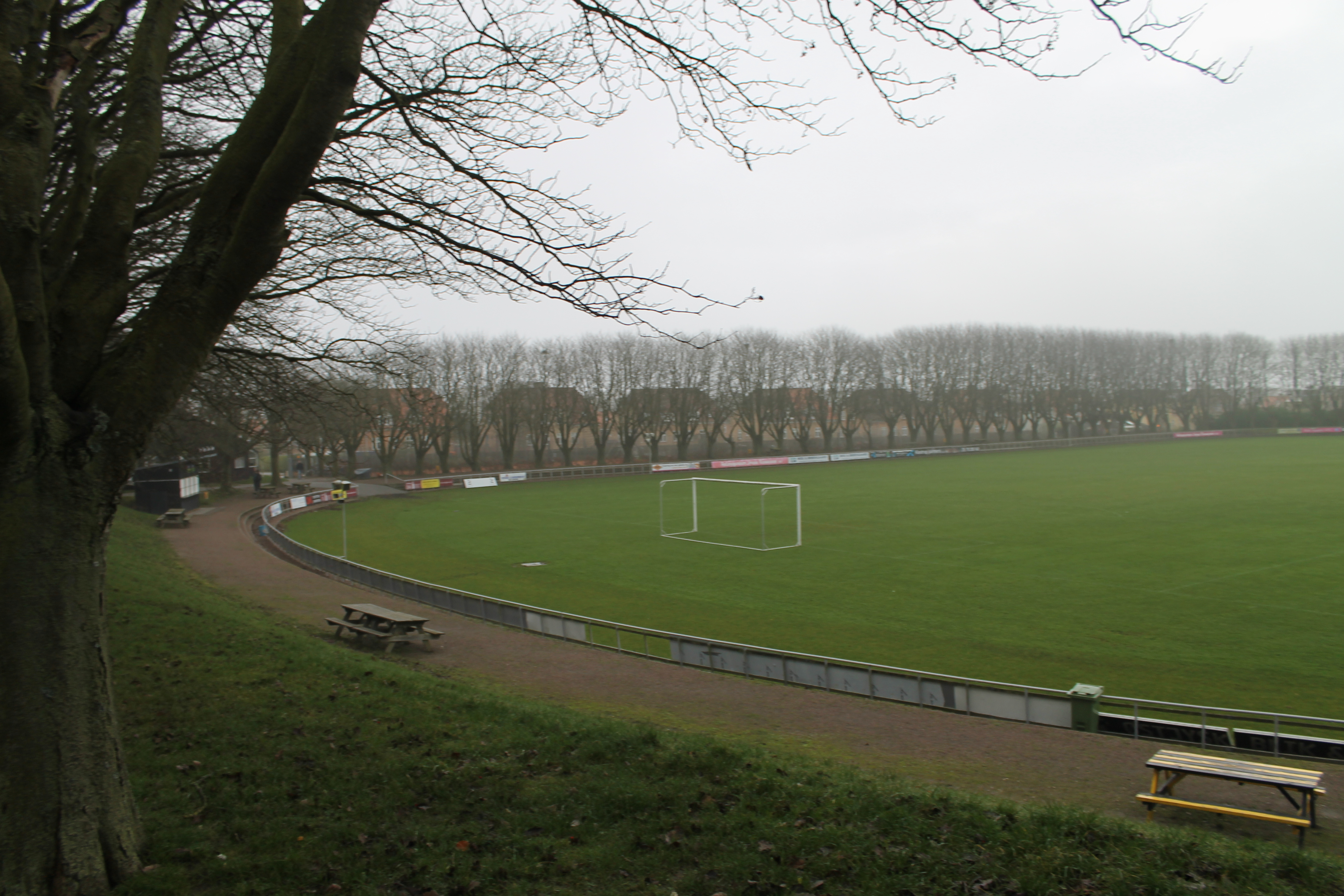
Riisvangen Stadion seen from the north.

The same day as the new board was elected, Børge Toft took the position of head coach, which turned out to be a successful move for the club. Toft managed to attract new sponsors and active members, which meant that Fremad had 27 members at the end of 1974. Sponsors provided kits and footballs, which helped revive the struggling club. The following years, the club attracted more members, and by 1980 Aarhus Fremad had 3–4 senior teams and 5–6 youth teams. The senior side competed in the 10th and 9th tier of Danish football between 1974 and 1980.

Between 1980 and 1983, Aarhus Fremad landed in financial decline once again. This time, however, issues were resolved faster. With the aid of Aarhus Municipality the club was granted a new indoor facility at Riisvangen Stadium. Before, the club used the old German barracks left from World War II. The new facilities led to an increase in active members which in turn strengthened the financial situation of the club. Due to these small victories, Aarhus Fremad set more ambitious targets for success on the field.

=== Rise to the Superliga (1984–1997) ===
Under head coach Kaj Jensen, the club promoted in back-to-back seasons, which would set in motion an unmatched run in Danish football of nine promotions over the course of 13 years. In 1987, Kim Poulsen took over as head coach, and a financial upturn meant that Aarhus Fremad could improve the first team by attracting better players. At the same time, ambitious Jan Hammerholt was elected as the new chairman of the board in 1988, which meant new prerequisites for the club. As the first Serie 3 club in Danish history, Fremad introduced sponsored cars for the first-team players. The players were also sent on training camp and the ambitions of the club soon grew.

Multiple promotions quickly followed. In 1988, the club promoted to Serie 2 and a few years the club competed in Serie 1. New players arrived, strengthening the first-team squad and helping the once struggling club continue its surge throughout the Danish divisions. In 1992, the club reached the Jutland Series, the fifth tier of the Danish football system. At the end of the first season in this division, Aarhus Fremad reached second place meaning direct promotion to the Denmark Series (fourth tier).

After one season establishing themselves at the fourth level, the club was ready for another promotion in 1995 to the Danish 2nd Division West (third tier). This marked Fremad's first meeting with the Danish divisions. This promotion, however, also meant the departure of head coach Kim Poulsen who had been instrumental for the club's meteoric rise of seven promotions in eight years. As his replacement, Per Bie became new head coach with the goal of leading the club to further success on the field. This success came instantly, as Fremad with Bie in charge came in first place and reached another promotion – this time to the Danish 1st Division (second tier). The club had attracted national attention during the last seasons and some of the better lower division players from regional clubs had joined the Aarhus Fremad first team during this period.

Alongside promotion to the second division, Aarhus Fremad Fodbold ApS was established in order to introduce professional contracts in the club. This would ensure that Fremad would be able to hold on to its players, who, because of their strong performances, had attracted interest from larger Danish clubs. In just 12 years, Aarhus Fremad had moved from the lowest tiers of Danish football to second division and professional football.

The first team quickly accustomed to the second division and established itself in the top of the league during the first season. The many promotions from the years before culminated on 11 June 1997, when Aarhus Fremad faced Svendborg fB away at Høje Bøge Stadium in what would become the biggest accomplishment in club history. A 3–1 away win meant that Aarhus Fremad sensationally reached promotion to the Danish Superliga in the same year as the club celebrated its centennial.

=== Superliga years (1997–1999) ===
Aarhus Fremad appointed former Bayern Munich and Denmark international Viggo Jensen as their new head coach for the 1997–98 Danish Superliga season. The club played its first match in the Superliga on 25 July 1997 against city rivals AGF. The game ended in a 2–1 win on goals by Søren Hermansen and Ulrich Gregers, who secured the win for Fremad at their temporary home field, Aarhus Idrætspark in front of 15,000 spectators. On the field for Fremad were players such as Brian Priske, Henrik Bundgaard and Kim Østergaard Nielsen, besides the goalscorers. The club avoided relegation their first season in the Superliga, despite the death of chairman Hammerholt halfway through the season, a day before the first spring game against AaB. Hermansen, who scored in the season opener, ended the season with 19 league goals and was only surpassed in the league-topscorer standings by Ebbe Sand from Brøndby IF.

Aarhus Fremad suffered relegation after the 1998–99 season, ending in 11th place. This would mark the start of a long decline for the club.

=== FC Aarhus and financial crisis (1999–2004) ===
In 1999 the first team merged with Skovbakken IK to form the club FC Aarhus with the goal of becoming one of the top clubs in Denmark. However, the merger only survived for six months, as the club had a debt of 1.8 million DKK. Instead, the Fremad board decided to continue their professional department under the name of FC Aarhus for the next four years with the continued ambition of reaching the Superliga.

The beginning of the new millennium was a tumultuous time in FC Aarhus, as frequent replacements in the head coaching seat signalled. Between 1999 and 2004, the club had six different coaching teams. A high point of this period occurred in the summer of 2002 when English footballing giants Manchester United won 5–0 over current FC Aarhus and former Aarhus Fremad players in a pre-season friendly, with goals scored by e.g. Ruud van Nistelrooy, Diego Forlán and Ryan Giggs. David Beckham also made an appearance during the match.

In 2003, as bankruptcy threatened the project, FC Aarhus was disbanded and Aarhus Fremad resurrected, with the club going back to its traditional virtues with a strong focus on volunteers. In 2004, the club relegated to the Danish third tier after five seasons in the second tier.

=== Few highs and many lows (2004–2015) ===
During the summer of 2004, 27-year old Anders Gerber is appointed head coach before the 2004–05 season. While the club ends in a mid-table finish the first season, the 2005–06 season was markedly better, and Fremad reached promotion to the second highest football league, ending in second place only behind Esbjerg fB in the table. The first season back in the second tier was a positive surprise, and the club avoided relegation after a 3–1 away win in the final round of the competition over Thisted FC on 24 June 2007. Martin Høgh scored a decisive brace in the 89th and 90th minute to secure another season in the second tier. In the following season Fremad relegated back to the 2nd Division again, ending in 15th place. Head coach Anders Gerber leaves the club after the disappointing relegation, and becomes head coach for FC Fyn. His replacement was Polish former footballer Krzysztof Popczyński.

Aarhus Fremad becomes a regular in the third highest football league the next few years under Popczyński, while the club continues to struggle financially. Mogens Kamp, who was the last in a series of contracted managers for Fremad during the 2000s, resigned on 1 September 2009 which meant a change in club structure. Volunteers work to find new sponsors during this period, with one of these, Søren Østergaard, becoming the new manager for Aarhus Fremad on 1 February 2010.

In the seasons 2010–11 and 2012–13, Aarhus Fremad finished in 2nd place, narrowly missing out on promotion to the second tier. On 11 July 2013, Popczyński was sacked and former FC Aarhus head coach Jesper Tollefsen was appointed as his replacement the same day. Claus Christiansen took over as head coach 11 months later, when Tollefsen was sacked after a poor season in which the club suffered relegation to the Danish fourth tier, a division which Fremad had not competed in since 1995. Fremad only played one season at this level, however, as they gained promotion back to the Danish third tier with five rounds left of the regular season. The last match of the season, a 5–0 home win over FC Djursland on 20 June 2015 meant the definitive return to the third tier after a season with only two losses and a +57 goal difference. Since the 2015–16 season Fremad has competed in the third tier.

=== New ambitions (2015–present) ===
The first half of the 2019–20 season was documented in the TV 2/Østjylland documentary, Det Skal Nok Gå which featured first-team players and head coach Morten Mølkjær in their struggle for promotion to the second tier, as well as the events surrounding Aarhus Fremad's unlikely Superliga-tenure. In December 2019, head coach Mølkjær moved to Danish 1st Division club Kolding IF after leading Aarhus Fremad to a first-place finish in their group before the winter break. His replacement, Morten Dahm Kjærgaard, who came from a position as assistant coach in second division side FC Fredericia was appointed in early January 2020. Despite a strong finish to the season after the league had been suspended due to COVID-19, Fremad finished second in the promotion group, losing out on goal difference to FC Helsingør who became the sole promoted team to the Danish 1st Division.

== Players ==
As of 3 September 2026

=== Current squad ===
Note: Flags indicate national team as defined under FIFA eligibility rules; some limited exceptions apply. Players may hold more than one non-FIFA nationality.

| No. | Pos. | Nation | Player |
|---|---|---|---|
| 1 | GK | DEN | Viktor Højbjerg |
| 2 | MF | DEN | Tristan Andrew |
| 4 | DF | DEN | Andreas Pisani |
| 2 | DF | DEN | Malthe Kjølby |
| 5 | DF | DEN | Erik Nissen |
| 6 | MF | DEN | Frederik Grube |
| 7 | MF | DEN | Magnus Kaastrup |
| 8 | MF | DEN | Simon Bækgaard |
| 9 | FW | DEN | Søren Andreasen |
| 10 | DF | DEN | Marcus Kirchheiner |
| 11 | FW | DEN | Kasper Lunding |
| 12 | MF | DEN | Marcus Ryberg |
| 13 | GK | DEN | Viktor de Paoli (on loan from AGF) |
| 14 | FW | FIN | Linus Rönnberg |

| No. | Pos. | Nation | Player |
|---|---|---|---|
| 15 | MF | DEN | Carl Nygaard |
| 17 | FW | DEN | Devon Appu |
| 18 | FW | NGR | Yusuf Abdullahi |
| 19 | DF | DEN | Oskar Elleberg |
| 20 | DF | ISL | Ólafur Hjaltason |
| 21 | MF | DEN | Marcus De Claville |
| 22 | MF | DEN | Jonas Østergård |
| 23 | FW | ISL | Ingimar Kristjánsson |
| 27 | MF | DEN | Magnus Kirchheiner |
| 28 | MF | NOR | Elias Egerton |
| 30 | GK | DEN | Tobias Brandt |
| 33 | DF | DEN | Alexander Ludwig |
| 70 | FW | DEN | Jashar Beluli |

=== Youth players in use 2025-26 ===
Note: Flags indicate national team as defined under FIFA eligibility rules; some limited exceptions apply. Players may hold more than one non-FIFA nationality.

| No. | Pos. | Nation | Player |
|---|---|---|---|
| 12 | MF | DEN | Marius Løkke |

=== Out on loan ===
Note: Flags indicate national team as defined under FIFA eligibility rules; some limited exceptions apply. Players may hold more than one non-FIFA nationality.

| No. | Pos. | Nation | Player |

== Backroom staff ==
=== Club officials ===
| Position | Staff |
|---|---|
| Chairman | Lars Kruse |
| Director | Jesper Blicher Dahl |
| Commercial manager | Morten Westy |

| Position | Name |
|---|---|
| Head coach | Mathias Damgaard |
| Assistant coach | Alexander Fischer |
| Goalkeeping Coach | Aleks Vejlgaard |
| Team leader | Poul Henning Kirkegaard |
| Team leader | Jørn "Figo" Pilgaard |

=== Head coaches since 1976 ===
The person responsible for direction of the first senior team has traditionally been given the title of head coach/trainer. In 2003, Jens Tang Olesen was given the title of manager/sports director.

| Name | Nationality | From | To | Refs |
|---|---|---|---|---|
| Jan Mortensen | Denmark | 1976 | 1977 | |
| Bjørn Distler | Denmark | ~1978 | ~1978 | |
| Jan Hammerholt | Denmark | 1979 | 1982 | |
| Kaj Jensen | Denmark | 1983 | 1986 | |
| Kim Poulsen | Denmark | 1987; 1998 | 1995; 1999 | |
| Per Bie | Denmark | 1996 | 1997 | |
| Viggo Jensen | Denmark | ~1997 | ~1997 | |
| Peer Danefeld | Denmark | 1999 | 2000 | |
| Frank Pingel | Denmark | 1 July 2000 | 5 October 2000 | |
| Henrik Bechmann and Henrik Gudmandsen † | Denmark | ~2000 | ~2000 | |
| Tom Matthiesen and Ole Brandenborg † | Denmark | ~2001 | ~2001 | |
| Jesper Tollefsen | Denmark | 2001; 10 July 2013 | 23 June 2003; 30 June 2014 | |
| Ole Brandenborg | Denmark | 23 June 2003 | 11 June 2004 | |
| Anders Gerber | Denmark | 6 July 2004 | 27 June 2008 | |
| Krzysztof Popczyński | Poland | 27 July 2008 | 10 July 2013 | |
| Claus Christiansen | Denmark | 30 June 2014 | 10 June 2017 | |
| Morten Mølkjær | Denmark | 16 June 2017 | 19 December 2019 | |
| Morten Dahm Kjærgaard | Denmark | 6 January 2020 | Present | |

- † Persons with this symbol in the "Name" column are italicised to denote caretaker appointments.

== Honours and accolades ==
=== Domestic ===
==== National leagues ====
- Danish Superliga (DBU level 1)
  - Best league performance:
    10th place (1): 1997–98
- Second Highest Danish League
  - Runners-up (1): 1996–97
- Third Highest Danish League
  - Winners (1): 1995–96 (q)
  - Runners-up (4): 2005–06, 2010–11, 2012–13, 2019–20

==== Cups ====
- DBU Pokalen
  - Best cup performance:
    Round of 16 (2): 1997–98, 1998–99

== Recent history ==
| Season | | Pos. | Pl. | W | D | L | GS | GA | P | Cup | Notes |
|---|---|---|---|---|---|---|---|---|---|---|---|
| 1997–1998 | SL | 10 | 33 | 9 | 6 | 18 | 51 | 73 | 33 | | |
| 1998–1999 | SL | 11 | 33 | 7 | 8 | 18 | 51 | 73 | 29 | | relegated |
7 seasons at lower levels
| 2006–2007 | 1D | 11 | 30 | 8 | 7 | 15 | 33 | 45 | 31 | | |
| 2007–2008 | 1D | 15 | 30 | 7 | 7 | 16 | 22 | 43 | 28 | | relegated |
6 seasons at lower levels

== Achievements ==
=== League summary since 1995 ===
- 2 seasons in the Danish Superliga
- 7 seasons in the Second Highest Danish League
- 15 seasons in the Third Highest Danish League
- 1 season in the Fourth Highest Danish League
