= Niels Kristensen =

Danish footballer (born 1988)

Personal information
- Full name: Niels Bach Kristensen
- Date of birth: 24 April 1988 (age 38)
- Place of birth: Denmark
- Position: Midfielder

Youth career
- Viby IF
- AGF

Senior career*
| Years | Team | Apps | (Gls) |
| 2006–2009 | AGF | 9 | (0) |

International career
| 2005 | Denmark U-17 | 2 | (0) |
| 2006 | Denmark U-18 | 3 | (1) |
| 2006–2007 | Denmark U-19 | 6 | (0) |
- * Club domestic league appearances and goals

Niels Bach Kristensen (born 24 April 1988) is a Danish retired professional football midfielder, who used to play for Danish Superliga side AGF Aarhus. He was forced to retire due to a knee injury in January 2010.
