= 2026–27 Danish 2nd Division =

35th season of Danish 2nd Division

CampoBet 2. Division
- Season: 2026–27
- Dates: 31 July 2026 – June 2027
- Matches: 192
- All statistics correct as of 3 July 2026.

The 2026–27 Danish 2nd Division, known as the CampoBet 2. Division under a naming sponsorship, was the 36th season of the Danish 2nd Division since its establishment in 1991. The season begins on 31 July 2026 with a group of twelve teams. After 22 rounds the teams were split into a promotion group and a relegation group, with points and goals carried over in full.

== Participants ==
B.93 and Middelfart BK had finished the 2025–26 Danish 1st Division in 11th and 12th place and were relegated to the 2nd Division. They replaced AB and Vendsyssel , who were promoted to the 2026–27 Danish 1st Division.

Nykøbing FC and FA 2000 had finished the 2025–26 Danish 3rd Division in 1st and 2nd place and were promoted to the 2nd Division. They replaced Ishøj IF and FC Helsingør, who were relegated to the 2026–27 Danish 3rd Division.

== Stadia and locations ==
Locations of the 2026–27 Danish 2nd Division teams.
Copenhagen teams: B.93, HIK, Fremad Amager and FA 2000
Aarhus Teams:Brabrand and VSK Aarhus

Club	Location	Stadium	Turf	Capacity	2025–26 position
B.93	Copenhagen	Østerbro Stadion	Artificial; Natural	7,200; 7,000	12th in 1D
Brabrand	Brabrand	Brabrand Stadion	Natural	1,000	10th
FA 2000	Frederiksberg	Frederiksberg Idrætspark	Artificial	5,000	2nd in 3D
FC Roskilde	Roskilde	Roskilde Idrætspark	Natural	6,000	4th
Fremad Amager	Copenhagen	Sundby Idrætspark	Artificial	7,200	7th
HIK	Hellerup	Gentofte Sportspark	Natural	15,000	6th
Middelfart G&BK	Middelfart	Middelfart Stadion	Natural	4,100	11th in 1D
Næstved BK	Næstved	MTM Service Park	Hybrid	7,500	3rd
Nykøbing FC	Nykøbing Falster	Lollands Bank Park	Natural	10,000	1st in 3D
Skive IK	Skive	SPAR Nord Arena	Natural	10,000	9th
Thisted FC	Thisted	Sparekassen Thy Arena	Natural	3,000	5th
VSK Aarhus	Aarhus	Vejlby Stadium	Hybrid	5,000 (12000)	8th

== Regular season ==
=== League table ===
Pos	Team	Pld	W	D	L	GF	GA	GD	Pts	Promotion or Relegation
1	Nykøbing FC	14	9	4	1	37	16	+21	31	Qualification to Promotion Group
2	FC Roskilde	15	7	8	0	30	14	+16	29	Qualification to Promotion Group
3	B.93	15	7	3	5	26	20	+6	24	Qualification to Promotion Group
4	Middelfart BK	15	5	7	3	29	23	+6	22	Qualification to Promotion Group
5	Skive IK	15	6	3	6	22	20	+2	21	Qualification to Promotion Group
6	Næstved BK	15	4	9	2	21	19	+2	21	Qualification to Promotion Group
7	Fremad Amager	15	5	6	4	18	23	−5	21	Qualification to Relegation Group
8	VSK Aarhus	15	5	5	5	20	19	+1	20	Qualification to Relegation Group
9	Brabrand	14	4	3	7	17	23	−6	15	Qualification to Relegation Group
10	HIK	15	4	3	8	14	25	−11	15	Qualification to Relegation Group
11	FA 2000	15	3	3	9	14	28	−14	12	Qualification to Relegation Group
12	Thisted FC	15	1	4	10	12	30	−18	7	Qualification to Relegation Group

Updated to match(es) played on 7 November 2026. Source:
Rules for classification: 1) points; 2) goal difference; 3) number of goals scored

=== Results ===
Home \ Away	B93	BRA	FA2	ROS	FAM	HIK	MID	NBK	NYK	SKI	THI	VSK
B.93				1–2				1–1				
Brabrand	1–1			1–1				0–1		1–3		
FA 2000	1–3	2–4								2–2		
FC Roskilde			5–1				1–1	2–2				1–0
Fremad Amager				1–1				1–1			2–2	
HIK		2–1	2–1				1–2					0–2
Middelfart BK		4–0			1–1				2–3		4–1	1–1
Næstved BK						1–1					3–1	0–2
Nykøbing FC	4–0		3–1	2–2		3–0						
Skive IK	2–1				0–2		0–0	1–2	2–3			
Thisted FC		3–1	0–1						0–3	0–1		
VSK Aarhus	2–2		0–0		3–0						3–1	

Updated to match(es) played on 20 September 2026. Source:
Legend: Blue = home team win; Yellow = draw; Red = away team win.
