= Jagvir Singh =

Danish footballer (born 2001)

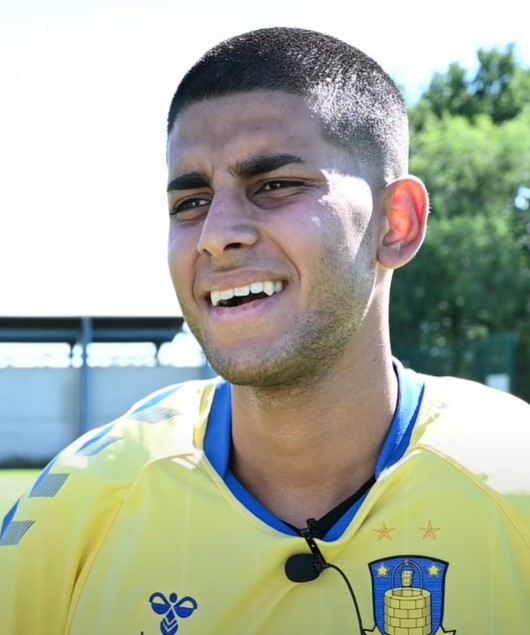
- Singh in 2021

Personal information
- Full name: Jagvir Singh Sidhu
- Date of birth: 4 January 2001 (age 25)
- Place of birth: Greve Strand, Denmark
- Position: Winger

Team information
- Current team: Ishøj
- Number: 16

Youth career
- 2005–2015: Brøndby
- 2015–2016: Lyngby
- 2016–2019: HIK
- 2019–2021: Brøndby

Senior career*
Years	Team	Apps	(Gls)
2019	HIK	4	(0)
2020–2022	Brøndby	4	(0)
2022–2024	Fredericia	11	(1)
2023–2024	→ Aarhus Fremad (loan)	31	(5)
2024–2026	Hvidovre	19	(0)
2025–2026	→ Helsingør (loan)	13	(1)
2026–	Ishøj	3	(0)
- * Club domestic league appearances and goals as of 10:54, 13 September 2026 (UTC)

Jagvir Singh Sidhu (born 4 January 2001) is a Danish professional footballer who plays as a winger for Danish 3rd Division club Ishøj.

== Career ==
=== Early career ===
Born in Greve Strand, Singh began playing football at an early age in the youth academy of Brøndby, a club his parents supported. At U15-level, he joined Lyngby Boldklub, where he played for a year before moving to the youth department of HIK.

Singh made his senior debut on 3 August 2019 in a third-tier 2nd Division match against Avarta. He made five total appearances for the club, including one in the Danish Cup.

=== Brøndby ===
On 1 September 2019, Singh moved to the Brøndby IF academy, where he was including in their U19 team. Singh was included in the newly established U20 team in May 2020, which was announced by director of football Carsten V. Jensen. He received a one-year contract extension as part of the new team, alongside fellow under-19 graduates Jacob Rasmussen, Emil Staugaard and Andreas Pyndt.

On 20 December 2020, Singh first appeared in Brøndby's first-team matchday squad in their Superliga tie against Horsens, remaining as an unused substitute in the 2–1 victory He would mostly appear in the U19 league that season, making 15 appearances in which he scored 12 goals.

Singh made his professional debut on 25 July 2021, coming on as a substitute in the 83rd minute of a 1–1 draw in the Danish Superliga against Viborg FF. He scored his first senior goal on 23 September, in an 8–1 away win over Allerød FK in the Danish Cup. Singh made his European debut on 9 December in the UEFA Europa League group stage match against Sparta Prague, coming on as a 72nd-minute substitute for Simon Hedlund in a 2–0 loss away at Stadion Letná.

=== Fredericia ===
Singh signed a three-year deal with Fredericia for an undisclosed fee. He made his debut for Fredericia in a 2–2 away draw against Nykøbing FC on the first matchday of the 2022–23 season, coming on in the 64th minute in place of Adam Jakobsen. He twisted his ankle in practice a few days later and missed the next three games. He returned in action on 17 August, coming on as a late substitute in a 2–1 loss to newly promoted Hillerød Fodbold. On 26 August, Singh scored his first Fredericia goal, curling in a shot in the far corner to secure a 3–3 away draw against Fremad Amager at Sundby Idrætspark.

On 19 July 2023, Singh was loaned out to Danish 2nd Division club Aarhus Fremad for the 2023–24 season. He scored his first goal for the club in the second game of the season, on 12 August 2023 in a 3–1 win over Roskilde.

On 29 July 2024, Fredericia announced the termination of Singh's contract.

=== Hvidovre ===
On 14 August 2024, Hvidovre IF, newly relegated to the Danish 1st Division, confirmed the signing of Singh on a contract until June 2026.

On transfer deadline day, 1 September 2025, Singh transferred to the Danish 2nd Division club FC Helsingør on a loan deal until the end of the year. In January 2026, Jagvir Singh extended his contract with FC Helsingør, continuing with the club for the upcoming season.

=== Ishøj ===
Singh joined Danish 3rd Division club Ishøj for the 2026–27 season.

== Career statistics ==
As of match played 5 September 2026

Appearances and goals by club, season and competition
Club	Season	League			Danish Cup		Continental		Other		Total	
Club	Season	Division	Apps	Goals	Apps	Goals	Apps	Goals	Apps	Goals	Apps	Goals
HIK	2018–19	Danish 2nd Division	8	0	0	0	—		—		8	0
HIK	2019–20	Danish 2nd Division	4	0	1	0	—		—		5	0
HIK	Total		12	0	1	0	—		—		13	0
Brøndby	2020–21	Danish Superliga	0	0	0	0	0	0	0	0	0	0
Brøndby	2021–22	Danish Superliga	4	0	2	2	1 (Note: Appearances in UEFA Europa League)	0	0	0	7	2
Brøndby	Total		4	0	2	2	1	0	0	0	7	2
Fredericia	2022–23	Danish 1st Division	11	1	1	0	—		—		11	1
Aarhus Fremad (loan)	2023–24	Danish 2nd Division	31	5	1	0	—		—		32	5
Hvidovre	2024–25	Danish 1st Division	17	0	2	0	—		—		19	0
Hvidovre	2025–26	Danish 1st Division	2	0	1	0	—		—		3	0
Hvidovre	Total		19	0	3	0	—		—		22	0
Helsingør (loan)	2025–26	Danish 2nd Division	13	1	0	0	—		—		13	1
Ishøj	2026–27	Danish 3rd Division	3	0	0	0	—		—		3	0
Career total			91	7	7	2	1	0	0	0	99	9
