= 2026–27 Danish 3rd Division =

CampoBet 3. Division
- Season: 2026-27
- Matches: 192
- All statistics correct as of 5 July 2026.

The 2026–27 Danish 3rd Division is the 5th season of the Danish 3rd Division since its establishment in 2021 as the new fourth tier in the Danish football league system. The season starts with a group of twelve teams. After 22 rounds, the group will be split into a promotion group and a relegation group. The top two teams of the promotion group will get promoted to the 2027–28 Danish 2nd Division. The bottom three of the relegation group will be relegated to the 2027–28 Denmark Series.

== Participants ==
Ishøj IF and FC Helsingør finished the 2025–26 season of the Danish 2nd Division in 11th and 12th place, respectively, and were relegated to the 3rd Division. They replaced Nykøbing FC and FA 2000, who were promoted to the 2026–27 Danish 2nd Division.

Ringsted IF, Holstebro and ASA finished the 2025–26 season of the Denmark series as group winners (east and west) and play off winner, respectively, and were promoted to the 3rd Division. They replaced Odder, Vejgaard BK and IF Lyseng, who were relegated to the 2026–27 Denmark Series.

== Stadia and locations ==
Locations of the 2026–27 Danish 3rd Division
Copenhagen teams: Brønshøj, Sundby BK, BK Frem and Vanløse IF

Club	Location	Stadium	Turf	Capacity	2025–26 position
ASA	Aarhus	Robotize Park	Natural		PW in DS
Brønshøj	Brønshøj	Tingbjerg Idrætspark	Natural	4,000	4th
FC Helsingør	Helsingør	Helsingør Stadion	Natural	4,500	12th in 2D
BK Frem	Valby	Valby Idrætspark	Natural	12,000	9th
HUI	Rungsted	Hørsholm Idrætspark		5,000	6th
Holbæk B&I	Holbæk	Holbæk Sportsby	Natural	4,000	7th
Holstebro	Holstebro	Holstebro Idrætspark	Natural	8,000	1st in DS(W)
Ishøj IF	Ishøj	Ishøj Idrætscenter	Natural	1,500	11th in 2D
Næsby BK	Odense	ALPI Arena Næsby	Natural	2,500	3rd
Ringsted IF	Ringsted	Ringsted Stadion	Natural	5,000	1st in DS(E)
Sundby	Amager Øst	Sundby Idrætspark	Artificial	7,200	8th
Vanløse IF	Vanløse	Vanløse Idrætspark	Artificial	10,000	5th

== Regular season ==
=== League table ===
Pos	Team	Pld	W	D	L	GF	GA	GD	Pts	Promotion or Relegation
1	Holbæk B&I	13	9	2	2	32	19	+13	29	Qualification to Promotion Group
2	Brønshøj BK	13	7	4	2	27	16	+11	25	Qualification to Promotion Group
3	Vanløse IF	13	6	6	1	19	11	+8	24	Qualification to Promotion Group
4	FC Helsingør	13	6	3	4	21	17	+4	21	Qualification to Promotion Group
5	Hørsholm-Usserød	13	5	4	4	29	22	+7	19	Qualification to Promotion Group
6	Næsby	13	5	3	5	23	20	+3	18	Qualification to Promotion Group
7	Sundby BK	13	5	1	7	21	21	0	16	Qualification to Relegation Group
8	ASA	13	5	1	7	16	19	−3	16	Qualification to Relegation Group
9	Ishøj IF	13	4	3	6	14	22	−8	15	Qualification to Relegation Group
10	BK Frem	13	3	5	5	21	21	0	14	Qualification to Relegation Group
11	Holstebro	13	4	1	8	18	34	−16	13	Qualification to Relegation Group
12	Ringsted IF	13	1	3	9	17	36	−19	6	Qualification to Relegation Group

Updated to match(es) played on 24 October 2026. Source:
Rules for classification: 1) Points; 2) Goal difference; 3) Number of goals scored

=== Results ===
Home \ Away	ASA	BBK	HEL	BKF	HUI	HBI	HOL	ISH	NBK	RIN	SUN	VAN
ASA												
Brønshøj BK												
FC Helsingør												
BK Frem												
Hørsholm-Usserød												
Holbæk B&I												
Holstebro												
Ishøj IF												
Næsby												
Ringsted IF												
Sundby BK												
Vanløse IF												

Updated to match(es) played on completed. Source: https://bold.dk/fodbold/stillinger/3-division/stilling
Legend: Blue = home team win; Yellow = draw; Red = away team win.
