= 2025–26 Danish 3rd Division =

CampoBet 3. Division
- Season: 2025–26
- All statistics correct as of 25 May 2025.

The 2025–26 Danish 3rd Division is the fourth season of the Danish 3rd Division since its establishment in 2021 as the new fourth tier in the Danish football league system. The season starts with a group of twelve teams. After 22 rounds, the group will be split into a promotion group and a relegation group. The top two teams of the promotion group will get promoted to the 2026–27 Danish 2nd Division. The bottom three of the relegation group will be relegated to the 2026–27 Denmark Series.

BK Frem and Nykøbing FC finished the 2024–25 season of the Danish 2nd Division in 11th and 12th place, respectively, and were relegated to the 3rd Division. They replaced Brabrand and VSK Aarhus, who were promoted to the 2025–26 Danish 2nd Division.

Vanløse IF, Vejgaard BK and Hørsholm-Usserød finished the 2024–25 season of the Denmark series as group winners (east and west) and play off winner, respectively, and were promoted to the 3rd Division. They replaced Holstebro, Avarta and Young Boys, who were relegated to the 2025–26 Denmark Series.

New for the season 2025-26 was the sponsor name CampoBet 3.division

On 9 March 2026, Holbæk B&I had 6 points deducted and received a fine of 100.000 dkk. as a result of a tax case.

== Stadia and locations ==
Locations of the 2023–24 Danish 3rd Division
Copenhagen teams: Brønshøj, Sundby BK, FA 2000, BK Frem and Vanløse IF

Club	Location	Stadium	Turf	Capacity	2024–25 position
BK Frem	Valby	Valby Idrætspark	Natural	12,000	11th in 2D
Brønshøj	Brønshøj	Tingbjerg Idrætspark	Natural	4,000	5th
FA 2000	Frederiksberg	Frederiksberg Idrætspark	Artificial	5,000	7th
Holbæk B&I	Holbæk	Holbæk Sportsby	Natural	4,000	3rd
HUI	Rungsted	Hørsholm Idrætspark		5,000	PW in DS
IF Lyseng	Aarhus	Lyseng Idrætscenter	Artificial	2,000	8th
Næsby BK	Odense	ALPI Arena Næsby	Natural	2,500	4th
Nykøbing FC	Nykøbing Falster	Lollands Bank Park	Natural	10,000	12th in 2D
Odder	Odder	Spektrum Park	Natural	1,000	6th
Sundby	Amager Øst	Sundby Idrætspark	Artificial	7,200	9th
Vanløse IF	Vanløse	Vanløse Idrætspark	Artificial	10,000	1st in DS(E)
Vejgaard BK	Ålborg	Soffy Road	Natural	1,000	1st in DS(W)

== Regular season ==
=== League table ===
Pos	Team	Pld	W	D	L	GF	GA	GD	Pts	Promotion or Relegation
1	Nykøbing FC	22	17	4	1	53	17	+36	55	Qualification to Promotion Group
2	FA 2000	22	13	3	6	33	23	+10	42	Qualification to Promotion Group
3	Næsby	22	11	3	8	42	39	+3	36	Qualification to Promotion Group
4	Brønshøj BK	22	9	5	8	34	38	−4	32	Qualification to Promotion Group
5	Vanløse IF	22	9	4	9	30	27	+3	31	Qualification to Promotion Group
6	Hørsholm-Usserød	22	8	5	9	38	38	0	29	Qualification to Promotion Group
7	BK Frem	22	8	4	10	22	24	−2	28	Qualification to Relegation Group
8	Holbæk B&I	22	9	5	8	43	33	+10	26	Qualification to Relegation Group
9	Vejgaard BK	22	7	5	10	30	46	−16	26	Qualification to Relegation Group
10	Sundby BK	22	7	3	12	32	41	−9	24	Qualification to Relegation Group
11	Odder	22	6	3	13	24	31	−7	21	Qualification to Relegation Group
12	IF Lyseng	22	5	2	15	14	38	−24	17	Qualification to Relegation Group

Updated to match(es) played on completed. Source:
Rules for classification: 1) Points; 2) Goal difference; 3) Number of goals scored

=== Results ===
Home \ Away	BRN	FRE	FA2	HOL	HOR	LYS	NAS	NYK	ODD	SUN	VAN	VEJ
Brønshøj BK		1–1	2–1	0–2	0–2	3–1	3–2	0–2	1–0	4–2	3–2	3–1
BK Frem	0–1		0–1	0–1	0–1	0–1	1–2	1–1	0–0	3–2	0–1	1–0
FA 2000	4–0	2–1		1–0	1–0	1–1	2–0	1–2	0–1	2–1	3–0	4–1
Holbæk B&I	5–3	3–0	1–2		4–4	6–0	1–2	1–5	0–0	2–2	4–1	2–2
Hørsholm-Usserød	3–0	0–1	5–1	0–4		4–2	1–1	0–2	2–0	4–3	0–1	3–3
IF Lyseng	1–0	0–1	0–2	1–1	1–2		2–1	0–1	0–1	2–1	1–2	0–2
Næsby BK	1–5	3–2	1–1	2–0	4–1	0–1		2–2	3–4	3–1	1–0	4–1
Nykøbing FC	0–0	1–2	1–0	1–0	2–1	4–0	5–3		2–1	2–0	2–1	5–0
Odder IGF	2–2	0–1	1–2	1–2	2–0	2–0	2–3	1–3		2–0	0–1	2–3
Sundby BK	3–3	1–2	1–2	2–0	2–1	1–0	1–0	1–3	3–0		1–0	3–0
Vanløse IF	0–0	1–1	4–0	1–3	2–2	2–0	2–0	2–2	2–0	3–0		2–3
Vejgaard BK	3–0	1–4	0–0	3–1	2–2	1–0	0–1	0–5	1–1	1–1	1–0	

Updated to match(es) played on completed. Source: https://globalsportsarchive.com/competition/3-division-2025-2026/76578
Legend: Blue = home team win; Yellow = draw; Red = away team win.

== Promotion group ==
=== League table ===
The top 6 teams will compete for 2 spots in the 2026–27 Danish 2nd Division. Points and goals carried over in full from the regular season.

Pos	Team	Pld	W	D	L	GF	GA	GD	Pts	Promotion
1	Nykøbing FC (P)	32	26	5	1	80	23	+57	83	Promotion to Danish 2nd Division
2	FA 2000 (P)	32	16	7	9	42	32	+10	55	Promotion to Danish 2nd Division
3	Næsby	32	16	5	11	63	50	+13	53	
4	Brønshøj BK	32	11	10	11	48	57	−9	43	
5	Vanløse IF	32	12	7	13	39	42	−3	43	
6	Hørsholm-Usserød	32	8	6	18	45	65	−20	30	

Updated to match(es) played on 31 May 2026. Source:
Rules for classification: 1) Points; 2) Goal difference; 3) Number of goals scored
(P) Promoted

=== Results ===
Home \ Away	BRN	FA2	HUI	NAS	NYK	VAN
Brønshøj BK		0–0	3–1	1–1	1–2	1–1
FA 2000	2–2		3–1	1–0	0–2	2–1
Hørsholm-Usserød	2–3	1–1		2–4	0–1	0–1
Næsby BK	4–1	1–0	5–0		1–2	1–1
Nykøbing FC	5–1	0–0	4–0	3–2		5–1
Vanløse IF	1–1	1–0	0–2	0–2	0–3	

Updated to match(es) played on Completed. Source: https://globalsportsarchive.com/competition/3-division-2025-2026/76578
Legend: Blue = home team win; Yellow = draw; Red = away team win.

== Relegation group ==
=== League table ===
The bottom 6 teams will compete to avoid the 3 relegations to the 2026–27 Denmark Series. Points and goals carried over in full from the regular season.

Pos	Team	Pld	W	D	L	GF	GA	GD	Pts	Qualification or relegation
1	Holbæk B&I	32	19	5	8	72	40	+32	56	
2	Sundby BK	32	11	7	14	48	53	−5	40	
3	BK Frem	32	11	6	15	42	44	−2	39	
4	Vejgaard BK (R)	32	10	5	17	37	61	−24	35	Relegation to Denmark Series
5	Odder (R)	32	9	6	17	43	55	−12	33	Relegation to Denmark Series
6	IF Lyseng (R)	32	7	3	22	26	64	−38	24	Relegation to Denmark Series

Updated to match(es) played on Completed. Source:
Rules for classification: 1) Points; 2) Goal difference; 3) Goals scored; 4) Away goals scored; 5) Play-off (played on neutral ground if determining teams for different rounds); 6) Draw.
(R) Relegated

=== Results ===
Home \ Away	FRE	HOL	SUN	VEJ	ODD	LYS
BK Frem		1–3	0–0	5–0	1–4	3–1
Holbæk B&I	4–1		2–0	1–0	4–2	2–1
Sundby BK	2–1	1–5		2–0	3–3	4–0
Vejgaard BK	2–0	0–2	0–1		3–0	2–0
Odder IGF	2–2	1–4	1–1	2–0		2–1
IF Lyseng	2–6	0–2	2–2	1–2	3–2	

Updated to match(es) played on Completed. Source: https://globalsportsarchive.com/competition/3-division-2025-2026/76578
Legend: Blue = home team win; Yellow = draw; Red = away team win.
