= 2025–26 Danish 2nd Division =

35th season of Danish 2nd Division

CampoBet 2. Division
- Season: 2025–26
- Dates: 1 August 2025 – 6 June 2026
- Champions: AB (4th title)
- Promoted: AB; Vendsyssel
- Relegated: Ishøj; FC Helsingør
- Matches: 192
- Goals: 533 (2.78 per match)
- Top goalscorer: Donavan Bagou (19 goals)
- Biggest home win: AB 5–0 HIK (22 May 2026); AB 5–0 Fremad Amager (26 September 2025); FC Roskilde 5–0 VSK Aarhus (9 August 2025)
- Biggest away win: HIK 1–5 AB (10 April 2026); FC Helsingør 1–5 AB (14 November 2025); HIK 0–4 AB (19 September 2025); FC Helsingør 0–4 Skive (1 August 2025)
- Highest scoring: HIK 4–3 Vendsyssel FF (30 May 2026); VSK Aarhus 5–2 Ishøj IF (9 May 2026)
- Longest winning run: AB (6 games)
- Longest unbeaten run: Vendsyssel FF (12 games)
- Longest winless run: FC Helsingør; Ishøj IF (10 games)
- Longest losing run: HIK; FC Helsingør (6 games)
- All statistics correct as of 6 June 2026.

The 2025–26 Danish 2nd Division, known as the CampoBet 2. Division under a naming sponsorship, was the 35th season of the Danish 2nd Division since its establishment in 1991. The season began on 1 August 2025 with a group of twelve teams. After 22 rounds the teams were split into a promotion group and a relegation group, with points and goals carried over in full.

Akademisk Boldklub won the promotion group and were promoted to the 2026–27 Danish 1st Division, together with runners-up Vendsyssel. Ishøj IF and FC Helsingør finished in the bottom two of the relegation group and were relegated to the 2026–27 Danish 3rd Division.

Vendsyssel and FC Roskilde had finished the 2024–25 Danish 1st Division in 11th and 12th place and were relegated to the 2nd Division. They replaced Aarhus Fremad and Middelfart BK, who were promoted to the 2025–26 Danish 1st Division.

Brabrand and VSK Aarhus had finished the 2024–25 Danish 3rd Division in 1st and 2nd place and were promoted to the 2nd Division. They replaced BK Frem and Nykøbing FC, who were relegated to the 2025–26 Danish 3rd Division.

== Stadia and locations ==
Locations of the 2025–26 Danish 2nd Division teams.
Copenhagen teams: Akademisk Boldklub, HIK and Fremad Amager
Aarhus Teams:Brabrand and VSK Aarhus

Club	Location	Stadium	Turf	Capacity	2024–25 position
Akademisk Boldklub	Gladsaxe	Gladsaxe Stadium	Natural	13,800	4th
Brabrand	Brabrand	Brabrand Stadion	Natural	1,000	1st in 3D
Ishøj IF	Ishøj	Ishøj Idrætscenter	Natural	1,500	7th
Næstved BK	Næstved	MTM Service Park	Hybrid	7,500	6th
Fremad Amager	Copenhagen	Sundby Idrætspark	Artificial	7,200	3rd
HIK	Hellerup	Gentofte Sportspark	Natural	15,000	9th
FC Helsingør	Helsingør	Helsingør Stadion	Natural	4,500	10th
FC Roskilde	Roskilde	Roskilde Idrætspark	Natural	6,000	12 in 1D
Skive IK	Skive	SPAR Nord Arena	Natural	10,000	5th
Thisted FC	Thisted	Sparekassen Thy Arena	Natural	3,000	8th
Vendsyssel FF	Hjørring	Hjørring Stadion	Natural	7,500	11 in 1D
VSK Aarhus	Aarhus	Vejlby Stadium	Hybrid	5,000 (10000)	2nd in 3D

== Regular season ==
=== League table ===
Pos	Team	Pld	W	D	L	GF	GA	GD	Pts	Promotion or Relegation
1	Akademisk Boldklub	22	16	2	4	66	21	+45	50	Qualification to Promotion Group
2	Næstved BK	22	13	5	4	35	24	+11	44	Qualification to Promotion Group
3	Vendsyssel	22	13	2	7	33	25	+8	41	Qualification to Promotion Group
4	FC Roskilde	22	10	5	7	38	24	+14	35	Qualification to Promotion Group
5	Thisted FC	22	9	6	7	27	23	+4	33	Qualification to Promotion Group
6	HIK	22	10	2	10	27	37	−10	32	Qualification to Promotion Group
7	VSK Aarhus	22	6	10	6	26	31	−5	28	Qualification to Relegation Group
8	Fremad Amager	22	8	6	8	23	26	−3	24	Qualification to Relegation Group
9	Brabrand	22	5	6	11	30	40	−10	21	Qualification to Relegation Group
10	Skive IK	22	3	11	8	22	28	−6	20	Qualification to Relegation Group
11	Ishøj IF	22	3	8	11	27	37	−10	17	Qualification to Relegation Group
12	FC Helsingør	22	3	3	16	17	45	−28	12	Qualification to Relegation Group

Updated to match(es) played on Completed. Source:
Rules for classification: 1) points; 2) goal difference; 3) number of goals scored

=== Results ===
Home \ Away	AB	BRA	FAM	HEL	HIK	ISH	NAE	ROS	SKI	THI	VEN	VSK
Akademisk BK		3–1	5–0	1–2	3–0	5–1	3–0	2–0	4–0	2–3	3–1	1–1
Brabrand IF	1–2		2–2	4–1	2–0	3–1	0–3	1–1	2–4	2–1	1–3	4–0
Fremad Amager	2–1	1–0		2–1	0–1	1–1	2–3	2–1	1–1	2–0	2–1	0–2
FC Helsingør	1–5	0–0	0–0		1–2	1–3	1–2	1–2	0–4	1–0	0–3	0–1
Hellerup IK	0–4	4–0	0–3	3–2		2–1	2–1	0–2	1–0	1–1	4–1	1–0
Ishøj IF	0–1	2–2	0–1	3–1	1–1		1–2	1–2	1–1	0–1	0–1	2–2
Næstved BK	1–2	0–0	1–0	2–1	2–1	2–2		1–0	2–0	0–2	1–1	2–2
FC Roskilde	4–1	5–1	2–0	0–1	4–1	2–1	2–3		1–1	1–2	2–0	5–0
Skive IK	0–0	3–2	0–0	1–1	1–2	1–1	0–0	1–1		1–2	1–2	1–1
Thisted FC	0–2	0–0	2–1	2–0	3–0	3–3	1–2	0–0	1–0		0–1	2–2
Vendsyssel FF	2–3	2–1	1–0	3–1	1–0	2–1	0–2	3–0	2–0	2–1		1–2
VSK Aarhus	1–3	2–1	1–1	2–0	4–1	0–1	1–3	1–1	1–1	0–0	0–0	

Updated to match(es) played on Completed. Source:
Legend: Blue = home team win; Yellow = draw; Red = away team win.

== Promotion group ==
=== League table ===
The top 6 teams competed for 2 spots in the 2025–26 Danish 1st Division. Points and goals carried over in full from the regular season.

Pos	Team	Pld	W	D	L	GF	GA	GD	Pts	Qualification or relegation
1	AB (P)	32	23	2	7	81	34	+47	71	Promotion to 1st Division
2	Vendsyssel (P)	32	20	3	9	57	37	+20	63	Promotion to 1st Division
3	Næstved BK	32	16	6	10	46	42	+4	54	
4	FC Roskilde	32	14	7	11	51	38	+13	49	
5	Thisted FC	32	14	6	12	40	33	+7	48	
6	HIK	32	12	2	18	39	68	−29	38	

Updated to match(es) played on Completed. Source:
Rules for classification: 1) Points; 2) Goal difference; 3) Goals scored; 4) Away goals scored; 5) Play-off (played on neutral ground if determining teams for different rounds); 6) Draw.
(P) Promoted

=== Results ===
Home \ Away	AB	HIK	NAE	ROS	THI	VEN
Akademisk BK		5–0	3–0	1–2	3–0	0–2
HIK	1–5		1–2	1–2	0–2	4–3
Næstved BK	4–1	1–2		0–0	0–2	1–3
FC Roskilde	2–3	3–2	0–1		0–1	1–1
Thisted FC	1–2	4–0	2–0	1–2		0–2
Vendsyssel FF	1–2	4–1	4–2	3–1	1–0	

Updated to match(es) played on Completed. Source:
Legend: Blue = home team win; Yellow = draw; Red = away team win.

== Relegation group ==
=== League table ===
The bottom 6 teams will compete to avoid the 2 relegations to the 2025–26 Danish 3rd Division. Points and goals carried over in full from the regular season.

Pos	Team	Pld	W	D	L	GF	GA	GD	Pts	Qualification or relegation
1	Fremad Amager	32	15	6	11	36	35	+1	45	
2	VSK Aarhus	32	9	14	9	39	42	−3	41	
3	Skive IK	32	6	16	10	34	39	−5	34	
4	Brabrand	32	8	9	15	38	48	−10	33	
5	Ishøj IF (R)	32	5	11	16	38	56	−18	26	Relegation to 3rd Division
6	FC Helsingør (R)	32	5	8	19	34	61	−27	23	Relegation to 3rd Division

Updated to match(es) played on Completed. Source:
Rules for classification: 1) Points; 2) Goal difference; 3) Goals scored; 4) Away goals scored; 5) Play-off (played on neutral ground if determining teams for different rounds); 6) Draw.
(R) Relegated

=== Results ===
Home \ Away	BRA	FAM	HEL	ISH	SKI	VSK
Brabrand IF		1–2	0–1	1–0	0–2	1–1
Fremad Amager	1–0		1–0	1–2	0–1	1–0
FC Helsingør	1–0	2–4		4–0	1–1	2–2
Ishøj IF	0–2	2–0	2–2		1–1	0–1
Skive IK	0–2	1–2	2–2	1–1		1–1
VSK Aarhus	0–0	0–1	3–2	5–2	0–1	

Updated to match(es) played on Completed. Source:
Legend: Blue = home team win; Yellow = draw; Red = away team win.
