= Lasse Sørensen =

Lasse Sørensen may refer to:

- Lasse Sørensen (footballer, born 1982)
- Lasse Sørensen (footballer, born 1999)
- Lasse Sørensen (racing driver)
