= Andreas Pyndt =

Danish footballer (born 2001)

Personal information
- Full name: Andreas Pyndt Andersen
- Date of birth: 4 March 2001 (age 25)
- Place of birth: Allerød, Denmark
- Height: 1.75 m (5 ft 9 in)
- Position: Midfielder

Team information
- Current team: Fredericia (on loan from IK Sirius)
- Number: 18

Youth career
- 2006–2011: Allerød
- 2011–2021: Brøndby

Senior career*
Years	Team	Apps	(Gls)
2018–2023	Brøndby	1	(0)
2022	→ B.93 (loan)	12	(1)
2022–2023	→ Hvidovre (loan)	31	(5)
2023–2024	Silkeborg	8	(1)
2024	→ IFK Göteborg (loan)	10	(0)
2024–	IK Sirius	16	(0)
2025–	→ Fredericia (loan)	31	(0)

International career
2017	Denmark U16	7	(1)
2017–2018	Denmark U17	11	(3)
- * Club domestic league appearances and goals as of 10:42, 13 September 2026 (UTC)

Andreas Pyndt Andersen (Danish pronunciation: [ˈpʰønˀt]; born 4 March 2001) is a Danish professional footballer who plays as a central midfielder for 1st Division club Fredericia, on loan from Allsvenskan club IK Sirius. He has represented Denmark at youth level.

== Club career ==
=== Brøndby ===
==== Youth career ====
Pyndt began his career at hometown club Allerød FK, before moving to Brøndby IF in 2011. As part of the under-12 side, he won the REWE Stockhausen Junior Cup 2012 in Germany by beating Bayer 04 Leverkusen in the finals on penalties, after having earlier beaten youth teams of Werder Bremen, Fortuna Düsseldorf, VfL Wolfsburg and Hannover 96. In October 2017, Pyndt signed a three-year contract extension with Brøndby.

In May 2020, Pyndt was announced as a part of the new Brøndby under-20 team, which was announced by director of football Carsten V. Jensen. He received a one-year contract extension as part of the new team, alongside fellow under-19 graduates Emil Staugaard, Jacob Rasmussen and Jagvir Singh. At that point, Pyndt was captain of the under-19 team.

==== First team ====
Pyndt made his first appearance for the Brøndby first team on 22 November 2018, as a second-half substitute in a 4–1 Danish Cup win over BK Marienlyst.

On 17 December 2020, Pyndt made his second first-team appearance, coming on as a substitute in extra time for Hjörtur Hermannsson as Brøndby lost 1–2 to Fremad Amager in the Danish Cup.

Pyndt made his European debut on 17 August 2021 in the UEFA Champions League play-off first leg against Red Bull Salzburg, which ended in a 2–1 loss.

==== Loan to B.93 ====
On 31 January 2022, Pyndt was loaned out to Danish 2nd Division club B.93 for the rest of the season. Pyndt made a total of 12 appearances for the club, where he also scored one goal.

==== Loan to Hvidovre ====
After returning from a recent loan spell, Pyndt was loaned out again; this time to Danish 1st Division side Hvidovre IF for one year. The deal was confirmed on 14 July 2022. He made his Hvidovre debut on 24 July, the first matchday of the season, starting in a 2–2 away draw against Næstved. His first goal for the club came on 5 August, slotting home by the near post to score the opener in a 3–1 home win over Hillerød Fodbold. He scored again in the following league match on 13 August as Hvidovre defeated Helsingør IF 3–0 away.

=== Silkeborg ===
On 30 May 2023, it was confirmed, that Pyndt had signed a deal with Silkeborg IF until the end of 2027.

In search of more playing time after getting just 22 minutes in the league and 248 minutes in the cup for Silkeborg, Pyndt was loaned to Swedish side IFK Göteborg until the summer on 8 February 2024. He made his debut for the club on 25 February, starting in a Svenska Cupen win over Skövde AIK. After a good spell in Göteborg, the club tried to buy him out. However, no agreement was reached and Pyndt returned to Silkeborg in the summer of 2024.

=== IK Sirius ===
Pyndt returned to Sweden on 19 August 2024, when he transferred to Allsvenskan club IK Sirius on a contract running until the end of the 2028 season.

On 7 July 2025, he returned to Denmark on a one-year loan to newly promoted Superliga club Fredericia for the 2025–26 season. He made 29 appearances and provided four assists for Fredericia, who were relegated at the end of the season. On 4 July 2026, the two clubs agreed to extend the loan for the 2026–27 season.

== International career ==
Pyndt has won seven caps for Denmark at under-16 level and 11 caps at under-17 level.

== Career statistics ==
As of match played 12 September 2026

Appearances and goals by club, season and competition
Club	Season	League			National cup (Note: Includes Danish Cup, Svenska Cupen)		Europe		Total	
Club	Season	Division	Apps	Goals	Apps	Goals	Apps	Goals	Apps	Goals
Brøndby IF	2018–19	Danish Superliga	0	0	1	0	0	0	1	0
Brøndby IF	2019–20	Danish Superliga	0	0	0	0	0	0	0	0
Brøndby IF	2020–21	Danish Superliga	0	0	1	0	—		1	0
Brøndby IF	2021–22	Danish Superliga	1	0	2	0	1 (Note: Appearances in UEFA Champions League)	0	4	0
Brøndby IF	Total		1	0	4	0	1	0	6	0
B.93 (loan)	2021–22	Danish 2nd Division	13	1	0	0	—		13	1
Hvidovre (loan)	2022–23	Danish 1st Division	31	5	1	0	—		32	5
Silkeborg	2023–24	Danish Superliga	4	0	2	0	—		6	0
Silkeborg	2024–25	Danish Superliga	2	1	0	0	3 (Note: Appearances in 2024–25 UEFA Europa League qualifying) (Note: Appearances in UEFA Conference League)	0	5	1
Silkeborg	Total		6	1	2	0	3	0	11	1
IFK Göteborg (loan)	2024	Allsvenskan	10	0	2	0	—		12	0
IK Sirius	2024	Allsvenskan	14	0	4	0	—		18	0
IK Sirius	2025	Allsvenskan	2	0	0	0	—		2	0
IK Sirius	Total		16	0	4	0	0	0	20	0
Fredericia (loan)	2025–26	Danish Superliga	27	0	2	0	—		29	0
Fredericia (loan)	2026–27	Danish 1st Division	4	0	1	0	—		5	0
Fredericia (loan)	Total		31	0	3	0	—		34	0
Career total			108	7	16	0	4	0	128	7

== Honours ==
Brøndby

- Danish Superliga: 2020–21
