= Lasse Sørensen (footballer, born 1982) =

Danish footballer

Personal information
- Date of birth: 6 March 1982 (age 44)
- Place of birth: Denmark
- Position: Goalkeeper

Team information
- Current team: FC Roskilde (goalkeeper coach)

Youth career
- 1988–1999: Boldklubben Frem

Senior career*
| Years | Team | Apps | (Gls) |
| 1999–2002 | BK Frem | | |
| 2002–2003 | HIK | | |
| 2003–2005 | Ølstykke FC | 15 | (0) |
| 2005–2007 | Næstved BK | | |
| 2007–2009 | AC Horsens | 3 | (0) |
| 2009–2010 | FC Roskilde | | |
| 2010 | BK Frem | | |
| 2010–2011 | FC Roskilde | | |
| 2011–2012 | Næstved BK | | |
| 2012 | Rishøj BK | | |
| 2012–2013 | FC Roskilde | | |
| 2013–2015 | BK Frem | | |

International career^{‡}
| 1998 | Denmark U-16 | 1 | (0) |
| 1998–1999 | Denmark U-17 | 14 | (0) |
| 1999–2001 | Denmark U-19 | 16 | (0) |
- * Club domestic league appearances and goals as of 9 November 2008 ‡ National team caps and goals as of 26 July 2001

Lasse Sørensen (born 6 March 1982) is a Danish retired professional football goalkeeper and the current goalkeeper coach of FC Roskilde.
