= Gustav Dahl (footballer, born 2004) =

Danish footballer (born 2004)

Personal information
- Full name: Gustav Bonde Dahl
- Date of birth: 20 March 2004 (age 22)
- Place of birth: Hjørring, Denmark
- Height: 1.78 m (5 ft 10 in)
- Position: Midfielder

Team information
- Current team: Vejgaard B
- Number: 5

Youth career
- Skibsby Højene IF
- Hjørring IF
- AaB

Senior career*
Years	Team	Apps	(Gls)
2022–2023	AaB	1	(0)
2023–2024	Vendsyssel	13	(0)
2024	Fram Reykjavík	4	(0)
2025–	Vejgaard B		

International career
2019–2020	Denmark U-16	9	(1)
- * Club domestic league appearances and goals as of 15:26, 26 December 2024 (UTC)

Gustav Bonde Dahl (born 20 March 2004) is a Danish footballer who plays as a midfielder for Denmark Series club Vejgaard Boldspilklub.

== Club career ==
=== AaB ===
For many years Dahl played both football and handball, but after moving from Hjørring IF to AaB as an U13 player, he could no longer continue the double life. He worked his way up through the youth ranks at AaB, and on the last game of the 2021–22 Danish Superliga, on 29 May 2022, 18-year old Dahl got his official debut for AaB in a game against Viborg FF.

=== Vendsyssel ===
In July 2023, Dahl was on trial at Danish 1st Division club Vendsyssel FF. Nothing more was heard from here until Smales-Braithwaite was suddenly included in Vendsyssel's match squad for the opening match against SønderjyskE on 21 July 2023, where he sat on the bench for the entire match. The deal was confirmed the following day. However, the club did not disclose the duration of the contract.

=== Fram Reykjavík ===
On 15 August 2024 it was confirmed that Dahl moved to the Icelandic Besta deild karla club Fram Reykjavík. Already on 19 August 2024, he made his debut when he was in the starting lineup in the league match against Breiðablik.

At the end of 2024 it was confirmed, that Dahl would leave the club again, after playing just four games for the club.

=== Later clubs ===
In 2025 Dahl was on the roster of Denmark Series club Vejgaard Boldspilklub, although the transfer was never officially confirmed anywhere.
