= 2026–27 Danish 1st Division =

85th season of Danish 1st Division

Betinia Liga
- Season: 2026–27
- Dates: 24 July 2026 – 31 May 2027
- Matches: 192
- All statistics correct as of 28 July 2026.

The 2026–27 Danish 1st Division marked the 31st season of the league operating as the second tier of Danish football and the 87th season overall under the 1st Division name. The league is governed by the Danish Football Association (DBU). The 1st Division changed its name to the BetiniaLiga after NordicBet's sponsorship ended in 2024–25.

== Participants ==
FC Fredericia and Vejle finished the 2025–26 season of the Superliga in 11th and 12th place, respectively, and were relegated to the 1st Division. They replaced Lyngby and AC Horsens, who were promoted to the 2026–27 Danish Superliga.

AB and Vendsyssel FF won promotion from the 2025–26 Danish 2nd Division. They replaced B.93 and Middelfart G&BK who were relegated to the 2026–27 Danish 2nd Division.

=== Stadia and locations ===
Locations of the 2025–26 Danish 1st Division teams.
Copenhagen: Hvidovre IF, AB Gladsaxe

Club	Location	Stadium	Turf	Capacity	2025–26 position
AaB	Aalborg	Aalborg Portland Park	Natural	13,997	7th
Aarhus Fremad	Aarhus	Riisvangen Stadium	Natural	5,000	8th
Akademisk Boldklub	Gladsaxe	Gladsaxe Stadium	Natural	13,800	1st in 2D
Esbjerg fB	Esbjerg	Blue Water Arena	Natural	18,000	3rd
Fredericia	Fredericia	Monjasa Park	Natural	6,000	12th in SL
Hillerød Fodbold	Hillerød	Helsingør Stadion	Natural	4,500	4th
Hobro IK	Hobro	DS Arena	Natural	10,700	9th
Hvidovre IF	Hvidovre	Hvidovre Stadion	Natural	12,000	5th
Kolding IF	Kolding	Autocentralen Park	Natural	10,000	6th
HB Køge	Herfølge/Køge	Capelli Sport Stadion	Artificial	4,000	10th
Vejle	Vejle	Vejle Stadion	Natural	11,060	11th in SL
Vendsyssel FF	Hjørring	Hjørring Stadion	Natural	7,500	2nd in 2D

=== Personnel and sponsoring ===
Note: Flags indicate national team as has been defined under FIFA eligibility rules. Players and Managers may hold more than one non-FIFA nationality.

Team	Head coach	Captain	Kit manufacturer	Shirt sponsor
AaB	(Denmark) Steffen Højer	(Denmark) Benjamin Tiedemann	Macron	Arbejdernes Landsbank
Aarhus Fremad	(Denmark) Mathias Damgaard	(Denmark) Marcus Kirchheiner	Berri	Faxe Kondi
Akademisk Boldklub	(Iceland) Fannar Berg Gunnólfsson	(Denmark) Marc Dal Hende	Select	Myriad360
Esbjerg fB	(Denmark) Hjalte Bo Nørregaard	(Denmark) Anton Skipper	Hummel	VIKING
FC Fredericia	(Denmark) Michael Hansen	(Denmark) Frederik Rieper	Hummel	Monjasa
HB Køge	(Denmark) Nicklas Pedersen	(Denmark) Mike Jensen	Capelli	Castus
Hillerød Fodbold	(Denmark) Christian Lønstrup	(Denmark) Jonathan Witt	Adidas	Dansk Varme Service
Hobro IK	(Denmark) Jens Gjesing	(Denmark) Frederik Dietz	Puma	DS Gruppen, Spar Nord
Hvidovre IF	(Denmark) Martin Retov	(Denmark) Daniel Stenderup	Uhlsport	KBS Byg
Kolding IF	(Norway) Karl Marius Aksum	(Denmark) Albert Nørager	Hummel	Mos Mosh
Vejle BK	(Denmark) Claus Nørgaard	(Denmark) Thomas Gundelund	Adidas	Arbejdernes Landsbank
Vendsyssel FF	(Denmark) Kim Engstrøm	(Denmark) Lasse Steffensen	Select	Absalon Properties

=== Managerial changes ===
Team	Outgoing manager	Manner of departure	Date of vacancy	Position in table	Replaced by	Date of appointment
Aarhus Fremad	(Denmark) Morten Dahm Kjærgaard	Signed by Silkeborg IF	30 June 2026	Pre-season	(Denmark) Mathias Damgaard	1 July 2026
Esbjerg fB	(Denmark) Sancheev Manoharan	Mutual consent	22 September 2026	12th	(Denmark) Hjalte Bo Nørregaard	23 September 2026
Kolding IF	(Denmark) Jonas Kamper	Sacked	6 October 2026	10th	(Norway) Karl Marius Aksum	7 October 2026

== Regular season ==
=== League table ===
Pos	Team	Pld	W	D	L	GF	GA	GD	Pts	Promotion or Relegation
1	Hvidovre	15	9	6	0	28	14	+14	33	Advances to Promotion Group
2	Vejle	15	8	6	1	27	16	+11	30	Advances to Promotion Group
3	Fredericia	15	7	5	3	25	11	+14	26	Advances to Promotion Group
4	AB	15	7	3	5	24	15	+9	24	Advances to Promotion Group
5	Aarhus Fremad	15	4	7	4	13	15	−2	19	Advances to Promotion Group
6	AaB	15	3	8	4	18	20	−2	17	Advances to Promotion Group
7	Hobro	15	4	5	6	17	25	−8	17	Advances to Relegation Group
8	Kolding	15	3	7	5	18	21	−3	16	Advances to Relegation Group
9	Hillerød	15	4	3	8	19	25	−6	15	Advances to Relegation Group
10	Esbjerg fB	15	3	5	7	17	27	−10	14	Advances to Relegation Group
11	Vendsyssel	15	2	7	6	15	25	−10	13	Advances to Relegation Group
12	HB Køge	15	2	6	7	20	27	−7	12	Advances to Relegation Group

Updated to match(es) played on 21 November 2026. Source: Betinia LIGA
Rules for classification: 1) Points; 2) Goal difference; 3) Number of goals scored

=== Results ===
Home \ Away	ABG	AAB	AAF	EFB	FRE	HBK	HIL	HOB	HVI	KOL	VEJ	VEN
Akademisk Boldklub		0–2		3–0	1–1				1–1			
AaB					0–3	0–0	1–0			1–1		2–2
Aarhus Fremad		1–2				3–1			1–3	2–1	0–0	
Esbjerg fB						2–2		1–2		1–1		0–2
FC Fredericia			0–0	1–0		3–0					2–2	1–1
HB Køge	1–0	2–1	1–2						1–3		0–0	
Hillerød Fodbold			1–1	2–3				3–1				
Hobro IK	1–0	2–1	1–2						1–3			
Hvidovre IF		2–2		2–1	2–1							2–2
Kolding IF	2–1				0–0		1–1		0–1		2–3	
Vejle Boldklub	2–2			4–2			5–4					4–1
Vendsyssel FF	0–3		0–0				1–0	1–2				

Updated to match(es) played on 20 September 2026. Source: Soccerway
Legend: Blue = home team win; Yellow = draw; Red = away team win.
