= 2021–22 Brøndby IF season =

Brøndby
2021–22 season
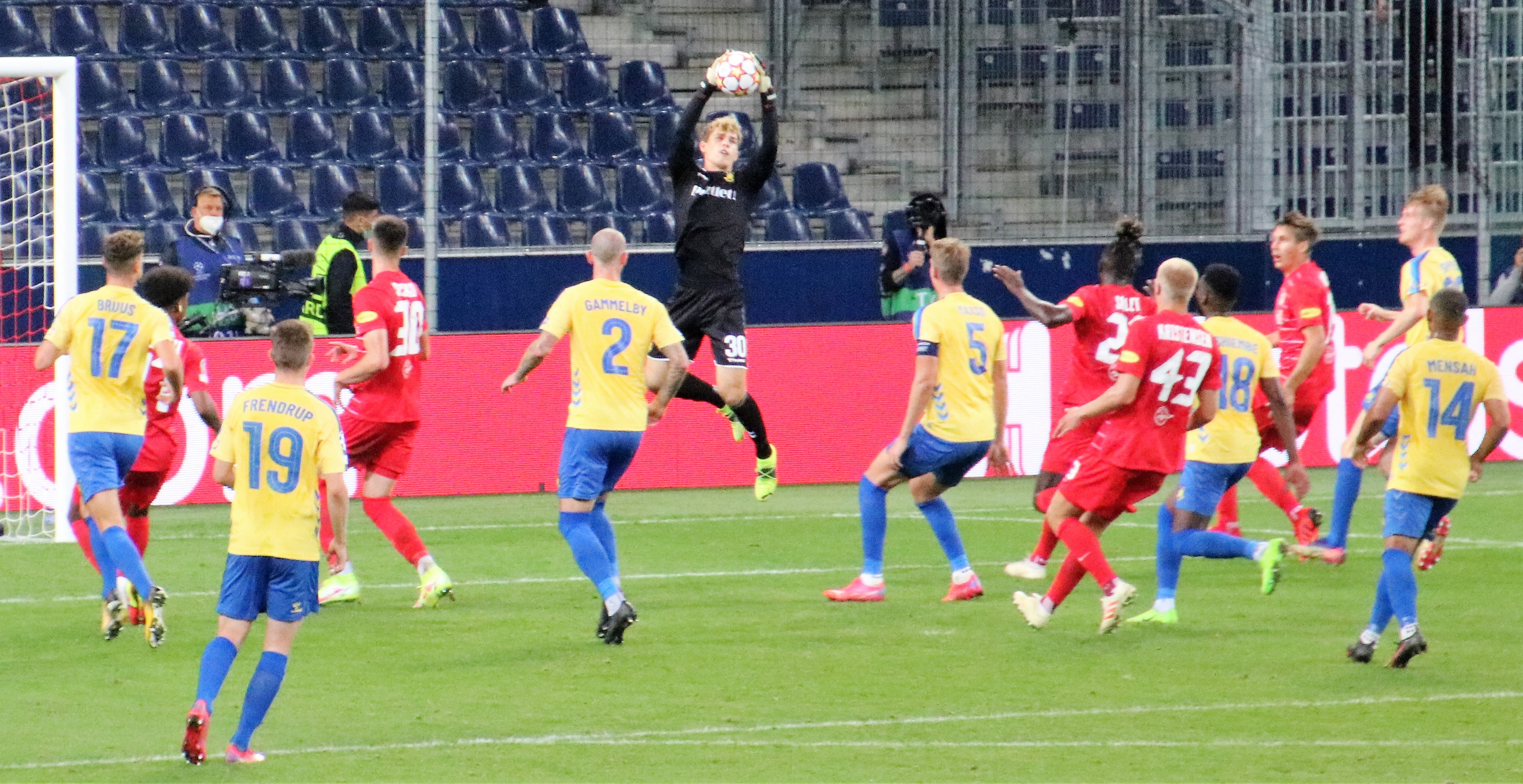
- Brøndby playing against Red Bull Salzburg in the 2021–22 UEFA Champions League play-off round
- Chairman: Jan Bech Andersen
- Head coach: Niels Frederiksen
- Stadium: Brøndby Stadium
- Danish Superliga: 3rd
- Danish Cup: Quarter-finals
- UEFA Champions League: Play-off round
- UEFA Europa League: Group stage
- Top goalscorer: League: Mikael Uhre (11 goals); All: Mikael Uhre (14 goals)

The 2021–22 Brøndby IF season was Brøndby IF's 41st consecutive season in top-division of the Danish football league, the 32nd consecutive in Danish Superliga, and the 56th as a football club. Besides the Superliga, the club also competed in the Danish Cup and this season's editions of the UEFA Champions League and UEFA Europa League. It is the third season with head coach Niels Frederiksen, after he replaced caretaker manager Martin Retov during the 2019–20 campaign.

Brøndby entered this season as reigning Danish Superliga champions, having won the league title for the first time in 16 years in 2021.

== Players ==
As of 1 September 2021

Note: Flags indicate national team as defined under FIFA eligibility rules; some limited exceptions apply. Players may hold more than one non-FIFA nationality.

No.	Pos.	Nation	Player
2	DF	DEN	Jens Martin Gammelby
3	DF	NOR	Henrik Heggheim
4	DF	NOR	Sigurd Rosted
5	DF	DEN	Andreas Maxsø (captain)
8	MF	DEN	Mathias Greve
9	FW	SRB	Andrija Pavlović
11	FW	DEN	Mikael Uhre
12	DF	DEN	Michael Lumb
14	DF	DEN	Kevin Mensah (vice-captain)
15	DF	PAR	Blas Riveros
16	GK	DEN	Thomas Mikkelsen
17	DF	DEN	Andreas Bruus
18	DF	DEN	Kevin Tshiembe
19	MF	DEN	Morten Frendrup
20	MF	SWE	Oskar Fallenius

No.	Pos.	Nation	Player
21	DF	SWE	Rasmus Wikström
22	MF	CRO	Josip Radošević
23	MF	USA	Christian Cappis
24	FW	CRO	Marko Divković (on loan from DAC)
25	MF	TUN	Anis Ben Slimane
27	FW	SWE	Simon Hedlund
28	DF	DEN	Anton Skipper
29	MF	DEN	Peter Bjur
30	GK	DEN	Mads Hermansen
31	FW	DEN	Jagvir Singh
34	MF	DEN	Andreas Pyndt
36	FW	DEN	Mathias Kvistgaarden
38	FW	DEN	Yousef Salech
40	GK	DEN	Jonathan Ægidius
42	MF	NOR	Tobias Børkeeiet

== Transfers ==
=== In ===
No.	Pos	Player	Transferred from	Fee	Date	Source
16	GK	(Denmark) Thomas Mikkelsen	(Denmark) Lyngby	Free	1 July 2021	
21	DF	(Sweden) Rasmus Wikström	(Sweden) IFK Göteborg	Undisclosed	29 July 2021	
3	DF	(Norway) Henrik Heggheim	(Norway) Viking	Undisclosed	30 August 2021	
24	FW	(Croatia) Marko Divković	(Slovakia) DAC 1904	Loan	31 August 2021	

=== Out ===
No.	Pos	Player	Transferred to	Fee	Date	Source
16	GK	(Denmark) Michael Tørnes	Unattached	End of contract	1 July 2021	
21	MF	(Denmark) Lasse Vigen	(Belgium) Zulte Waregem	Undisclosed	1 July 2021	
3	DF	(Germany) Anthony Jung	(Germany) Werder Bremen	Free	1 July 2021	
1	GK	(Germany) Marvin Schwäbe	(Germany) 1. FC Köln	Free	1 July 2021	
18	MF	(Denmark) Jesper Lindstrøm	(Germany) Eintracht Frankfurt	€7.0 million	11 July 2021	
6	DF	(Iceland) Hjörtur Hermannsson	(Italy) Pisa	Undisclosed	16 July 2021	
24	DF	(Denmark) Joel Kabongo	(Denmark) Randers	Undisclosed	27 July 2021	
7	MF	(Denmark) Rezan Corlu	(Denmark) Lyngby	Undisclosed	31 August 2021	

== Competitions ==
=== Danish Superliga ===
==== League table ====
Pos	Team	Pld	W	D	L	GF	GA	GD	Pts	Qualification
1	Copenhagen	22	14	6	2	43	13	+30	48	Qualification for the Championship round
2	Midtjylland	22	13	3	6	37	22	+15	42	Qualification for the Championship round
3	Brøndby	22	11	7	4	30	24	+6	40	Qualification for the Championship round
4	AaB	22	11	5	6	36	26	+10	38	Qualification for the Championship round
5	Randers	22	9	6	7	26	25	+1	33	Qualification for the Championship round

Source: Danish Football Association (in Danish), Soccerway
Rules for classification: 1) Points; 2) Goal difference; 3) Goals scored; 4) Away goals scored; 5) Play-off (played on neutral ground if determining teams for different rounds); 6) Draw.

==== Results by round - Regular season ====
Matchday	1	2	3	4	5	6	7	8	9	10	11	12	13	14	15	16	17	18	19	20	21	22
Ground	A	H	A	A	H	A	H	H	A	H	A	H	H	A	H	A	H	A	H	A	H	A
Result	D	D	D	L	L	D	W	D	L	W	D	W	W	W	W	W	W					
Position	6	6	8	10	10	9	8	8	10	8	8	6	6	6	5	5	3					

Updated to match(es) played on 28 November 2021. Source: http://www.superliga.dk/
A = Away; H = Home; W = Win; D = Draw; L = Loss

==== Championship round ====
Pos	Team	Pld	W	D	L	GF	GA	GD	Pts	Qualification	COP	MID	SIL	BRO	AAB	RAN
2	Midtjylland	32	20	5	7	59	33	+26	65	Qualification for the Champions League second qualifying round	0–0	—	3–2	2–2	2–0	3–2
3	Silkeborg	32	13	10	9	54	37	+17	49	Qualification for the Europa League play-off round	3–1	1–4	—	3–0	4–2	1–0
4	Brøndby	32	13	9	10	40	41	−1	48	Qualification for the Europa Conference League second qualifying round	1–1	1–3	2–1	—	0–1	0–1
5	AaB	32	13	6	13	47	45	+2	45	Qualification for the European play-off match	0–1	1–2	1–2	1–3	—	3–0
6	Randers	32	12	7	13	36	42	−6	43		0–2	1–3	1–2	2–1	2–2	—

Source: Danish Football Association (in Danish), Soccerway
Legend: Blue = home team win; Yellow = draw; Red = away team win.
Rules for classification: 1) Points; 2) Goal difference; 3) Goals scored; 4) Away goals scored; 5) Play-off (played on neutral ground if determining teams for different rounds); 6) Draw.

=== Danish Cup ===
23 September 2021 Third round	Allerød FK	1–8	Brøndby	Lillerød
19:45				Stadium: Allerød Idrætspark

28 October 2021 Fourth round	Aalborg Freja	0–3	Brøndby	Aalborg
18:00	Vingaard (yellow card) 20'	Report	Pavlović 16' (Riveros); Singh 52' (Børkeeiet); Fallenius 65' (Greve)	Stadium: Aalborg Stadium; Referee: Mikkel Redder

5 December 2021 Quarter-finals 1st leg	Brøndby	0–2	FC Midtjylland	Brøndbyvester
14:30 CET	Mensah (yellow card) 20'; Ben Slimane (yellow card) 27'	FCM Summary	Charles 22' (yellow card) 37'; Brumado 61' (Dyhr); Lind (yellow card) 88'	Stadium: Brøndby Stadium; Referee: Sandi Putros

12 December 2021 Quarter-finals 2nd leg	Midtjylland	1–2 (3–2 agg.)	Brøndby	Herning
18:00 CET	Evander (yellow card) 17'; Onyedika 36' (Andersson); Lind (yellow card) 53'; Lössl (yellow card) 90+3'	FCM Summary	Maxsø (yellow card) 16'; Cappis (yellow card) 16'; Divković 28' (Mensah) (yellow card) 45' (goal) 73' (Riveros); Hedlund (yellow card) 89'	Stadium: MCH Arena; Referee: Jens Maae

=== UEFA Champions League ===
17 August 2021 Play-off round 1st leg	Red Bull Salzburg (Austria)	2–1	(Denmark) Brøndby	Stadion Wals-Siezenheim, Wals-Siezenheim
21:00	Adeyemi 56'; Aaronson 90'	Report	Uhre 4'	Attendance: 17,538; Referee: Szymon Marciniak (Poland)

25 August 2021 Play-off round 2nd leg	Brøndby (Denmark)	1–2 (2–4 agg.)	(Austria) Red Bull Salzburg	Brøndby Stadium, Brøndbyvester
21:00	Maxsø 62'	Report	Šeško 4'; Aaronson 10'	Attendance: 22,397; Referee: Carlos del Cerro Grande (Spain)

=== UEFA Europa League ===
==== Group stage ====
The draw for the group stage was held on 27 August 2021.

Pos	Team	Pld	W	D	L	GF	GA	GD	Pts	Qualification	LYO	RAN	SPP	BRO
1	(France) Lyon	6	5	1	0	16	5	+11	16	Advance to round of 16	—	1–1	3–0	3–0
2	(Scotland) Rangers	6	2	2	2	6	5	+1	8	Advance to knockout round play-offs	0–2	—	2–0	2–0
3	(Czech Republic) Sparta Prague	6	2	1	3	6	9	−3	7	Transfer to Europa Conference League	3–4	1–0	—	2–0
4	(Denmark) Brøndby	6	0	2	4	2	11	−9	2		1–3	1–1	0–0	—

Source: UEFA
Rules for classification: Group stage tiebreakers

16 September 2021 1	Brøndby (Denmark)	0–0	(Czech Republic) Sparta Prague	Brøndby Stadium, Brøndbyvester
21:00		Report		Attendance: 18,867; Referee: Aleksandar Stavrev (North Macedonia)

30 September 2021 2	Lyon (France)	3–0	(Denmark) Brøndby	Parc Olympique Lyonnais, Décines-Charpieu
18:45	Toko Ekambi 64', 71'; Aouar 86'	Report		Attendance: 25,466; Referee: Harald Lechner (Austria)

21 October 2021 3	Rangers (Scotland)	2–0	(Denmark) Brøndby	Ibrox Stadium, Glasgow
21:00 (20:00 BST)	Balogun 18'; Roofe 30'	Report		Attendance: 46,842; Referee: Fran Jović (Croatia)

4 November 2021 4	Brøndby (Denmark)	1–1	(Scotland) Rangers	Brøndby Stadium, Brøndbyvester
18:45	Balogun 45' (o.g.)	Report	Hagi 77'	Attendance: 20,462; Referee: Nikola Dabanović (Montenegro)

25 November 2021 5	Brøndby (Denmark)	1–3	(France) Lyon	Brøndby Stadium, Brøndbyvester
21:00	Uhre 51'	Report	Cherki 57', 66'; Slimani 76'	Attendance: 16,645; Referee: Georgi Kabakov (Bulgaria)

9 December 2021 6	Sparta Prague (Czech Republic)	2–0	(Denmark) Brøndby	Stadion Letná, Prague
18:45	Hancko 43'; Hložek 49'	Report		Attendance: 976; Referee: Craig Pawson (England)

== Statistics ==
=== Goalscorers ===
As of 12 December 2021

Rank	Player	Danish Superliga	Danish Cup	Champions League	Europa League	Total
1	(Denmark) Mikael Uhre	11	1	1	1	14
2	(United States) Christian Cappis	3	2	0	0	5
3	(Serbia) Andrija Pavlović	0	3	0	0	3
4	(Croatia) Marko Divković	0	2	0	0	2
4	(Sweden) Oskar Fallenius	0	2	0	0	2
4	(Denmark) Morten Frendrup	2	0	0	0	2
4	(Denmark) Andreas Maxsø	1	0	1	0	2
4	(Denmark) Jagvir Singh	0	2	0	0	2
9	(Norway) Tobias Børkeeiet	1	0	0	0	1
9	(Denmark) Andreas Bruus	1	0	0	0	1
9	(Sweden) Simon Hedlund	1	0	0	0	1
9	(Denmark) Michael Lumb	0	1	0	0	1
9	(Denmark) Kevin Mensah	1	0	0	0	1
9	(Croatia) Josip Radošević	1	0	0	0	1
9	(Norway) Sigurd Rosted	1	0	0	0	1
9	(Tunisia) Anis Ben Slimane	1	0	0	0	1
Own goals		1	0	0	1	2
Total		25	13	2	2	42
