= Soffy Road =

Football stadium in Denmark

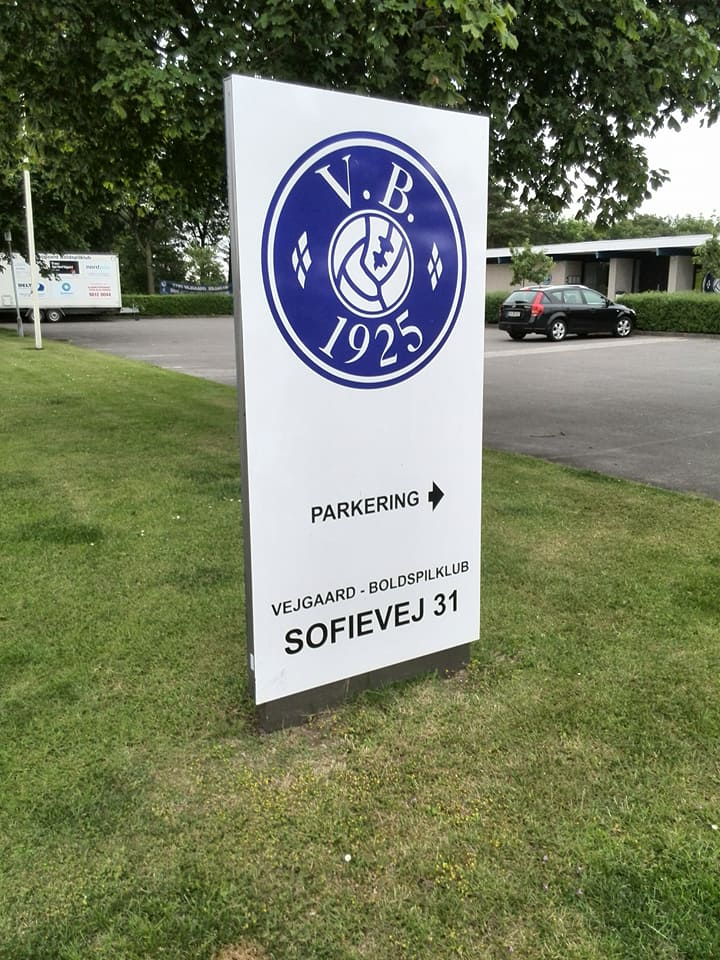
- Entrance to Soffy Road
- Interactive map of Soffy Road
- Full name: Soffy Road
- Location: Aalborg, Denmark
- Capacity: Not available
- Surface: Grass
- Record attendance: 1,005 (Vejgaard BK vs FC Nordsjælland, 27 September 2017)

Construction
- Built: 1980

Tenant
- Vejgaard BK

Soffy Road is an association football stadium in Vejgaard, Aalborg, Denmark. It is the home stadium of Denmark Series club Vejgaard BK. Information on stadium capacity is not available, but the attendance record is 1,005 which happened in the third round Danish Cup matchup against Danish Superliga club FC Nordsjælland on 27 September 2017.

In March 1980, plans for a new stadium were initiated on a local municipal level. These were approved on 14 April by Aalborg mayor Marius Andersen and became effective as of 15 September 1980. The plans would eventually lead to the construction of Soffy Road. The stadium name 'Soffy Road' is a Danglish expression, an example of code-switching, on the address of the ground, which is Sofievej 31 (Sophie Road 31).
