= Magnus Lysholm =

Danish footballer (born 2002)

Personal information
- Full name: Magnus Lysholm Carsten Petersen
- Date of birth: 18 January 2002 (age 24)
- Place of birth: Frederiksberg, Denmark
- Height: 1.98 m (6 ft 6 in)
- Position: Right-back

Team information
- Current team: FC Roskilde
- Number: 5

Youth career
- –2014: Copenhagen
- 2015-2017: B.93
- 2017-2021: Hvidovre

Senior career*
Years	Team	Apps	(Gls)
2021–2025	Hvidovre	44	(1)
2024	→ Fremad Amager (loan)	13	(0)
2024–2025	→ FC Roskilde (loan)	24	(0)
2025–	FC Roskilde	35	(1)
- * Club domestic league appearances and goals as of 3 October 2026

Magnus Lysholm Carsten Petersen (born 18 January 2002) is a Danish footballer who plays as a right-back for Danish 2nd Division club FC Roskilde.

== Career ==
=== Club career ===
Lysholm started his football career in F.C. Copenhagen, before moving to B.93 in 2015. He later moved to Hvidovre IF, where he was initially part of the club's academy.

Lysholm worked his way up through the club's academy before making his official debut for Hvidovre's first team on 27 November 2021, when he was substituted with 8 minutes remaining in Hvidovre's 5–1 victory over FC Fredericia in the Danish 1st Division. On 20 April 2022, Lysholm signed his first contract with Hvidovre and was promoted to the first team squad. He finished the season with 14 league appearances.

With 19 league appearances in the 2022–23 season, Lysholm was an important part of Hvidovre's promotion to the 2023-24 Danish Superliga. From here, however, playing time became more limited. In the first 17 games of the season, Lysholm played just over 415 minutes, which is why in January 2024 he was loaned out to the Danish 2nd Division club Fremad Amager for the rest of the season in search of more playing time, alongside his teammate, Marius Papuga. Already on 28 May 2024, before the season ended, Fremad Amager confirmed that Lysholm had gone on vacation and would return to Hvidovre after the summer.

Lysholm made three league appearances for Hvidovre at the start of the 2024–25 season, as well as a full match in the cup, before he was loaned out to newly promoted Danish 1st Division club FC Roskilde on 16 August 2024, until the end of 2024.

After the season, Lysholm returned to Hvidovre. He was with the squad for the first few matches, but on 20 August 2025, Lysholm returned to FC Roskilde, this time on a permanent deal until June 2027.
