= Marius Papuga =

Danish footballer (born 2005)

Personal information
- Full name: Marius Holst Papuga
- Date of birth: 13 May 2005 (age 21)
- Place of birth: Rødovre, Denmark
- Position: Midfielder

Team information
- Current team: Hvidovre
- Number: 17

Youth career
- Hvidovre

Senior career*
Years	Team	Apps	(Gls)
2022–	Hvidovre	16	(0)
2024	→ Fremad Amager (loan)	13	(1)

International career
2023	Denmark U-18	3	(0)
- * Club domestic league appearances and goals as of 17:05, 21 September 2024 (UTC)

Marius Holst Papuga (born 13 May 2005) is a Danish footballer who plays as a midfielder for Danish 1st Division club Hvidovre IF.

== Career ==
=== Hvidovre IF ===
Papuga is a product of Hvidovre IF's talent department, where he made it all the way to the first team. In February 2022, at the age of 16, Papuga signed a three-year youth contract, which was the first time in Hvidovre IF in many years. On May 23, 2022, shortly after his 17th birthday, Papuga made his official debut for Hvidovre in the Danish 1st Division in a match against FC Helsingør. In the following 2022–23 season, young Papuga played 96 minutes over 7 games, contributing to Hvidovre's promotion to the 2023-24 Danish Superliga. In March 2023, Papuga was also selected for the Danish U-18 national team squad to play a tournament in Spain.

On July 21, 2023, Papuga made his debut in the top Danish league in a match against FC Midtjylland. In the first 17 games of the season, Papuga played just over 77 minutes in the league and 215 minutes in the Danish Cup, which is why in January 2024 he was loaned out to the Danish 2nd Division club Fremad Amager for the rest of the season in search of more playing time, alongside his teammate, Magnus Lysholm. Papuga returned to Hvidovre after the season.

In November 2024, it was revealed that Papuga had sustained an injury that was expected to keep him out for the next 12 months following surgery.
