= Jakob Johansson (footballer, born 1998) =

Danish footballer (born 1998)

Personal information
- Full name: Jakob Warburg Johansson
- Date of birth: 6 August 1998 (age 28)
- Place of birth: Hvidovre, Denmark
- Height: 1.81 m (5 ft 11 in)
- Positions: Forward; attacking midfielder

Team information
- Current team: HIK
- Number: 11

Youth career
- Hvidovre
- –2017: Nordsjælland

Senior career*
Years	Team	Apps	(Gls)
2016–2019	Nordsjælland	3	(0)
2018	→ Randers (loan)	8	(0)
2018–2019	→ HB Køge (loan)	27	(11)
2019–2021	HB Køge	77	(11)
2021–2023	Fremad Amager	57	(8)
2023	Helsingør	6	(1)
2024	HB Torshavn	15	(4)
2024–2025	Weiche Flensburg	8	(1)
2025–2026	Brønshøj	31	(11)
2026–	HIK	4	(0)

International career
2015	Denmark U17	3	(0)
2015–2016	Denmark U18	5	(4)
2016	Denmark U19	6	(2)
2017–2019	Denmark U20	4	(0)
- * Club domestic league appearances and goals as of 21:00, 3 October 2026 (UTC)

Jakob Warburg Johansson (born 6 August 1998) is a Danish professional footballer who plays as a forward for HIK. He represented Denmark's youth teams from 2015 to 2019.

== Club career ==
=== Nordsjælland ===
Johansson is a product of FC Nordsjælland, where he played since he was U15 player. He got his debut for FC Nordsjælland on 7 August 2016. Johansson started on the bench, but replaced Mathias Jensen in the 56th minute in a 1–2 defeat against AaB in the Danish Superliga.

FC Nordsjælland confirmed on 6 June 2017, that they had extended Johansson's contract and promoted him to the first team squad.

==== Loan to Randers ====
On 31 January 2018, Johansson was loaned out to Randers FC with an option to buy, for the rest of the season.

=== HB Køge ===
On 7 August 2018 Johansson was sent on another loan. This time he was loaned to HB Køge in the Danish 1st Division for the entire 2018–19 season. Johansson had a good spell at the club, scoring 15 goals in 30 games. The club announced on 14 June 2019, that he would continue at the club, signing a permanent two-year contract with the player.

Johansson left Køge at the end of the 2020–21 season.

=== Fremad Amager ===
On 6 July 2021, Johansson signed with Danish 1st Division club Fremad Amager on a free agent. After the club was relegated to the Danish 2nd Division, Johansson left the club at the end of the 2022–23 season.

=== FC Helsingør ===
On 5 October 2023, Johansson signed a deal with FC Helsingør until the end of 2023. With 7 games and 2 goals to his name, Jakob Johansson left Helsingør at the end of the year when his contract expired.

=== HB Torshavn ===
In March 2024, Johansson joined Faroese club HB Torshavn until the end of 2024. On 2 July the club confirmed that Johansson was done at the club after just four months.

=== Weiche Flensburg ===
On 5 July 2024 Johansson transferred to German Regionalliga Nord club SC Weiche Flensburg 08.

On February 3, 2025, the club confirmed that the parties had agreed to terminate Johansson's contract.

=== Brønshøj ===
On March 7, 2025, it was confirmed that Johansson had moved to Danish 3rd Division club Brønshøj Boldklub.

=== HIK ===
On 2 September 2026, Johansson joined Danish 2nd Division club Hellerup IK.
