= Sashwat Rana =

Danish footballer (born 2007)

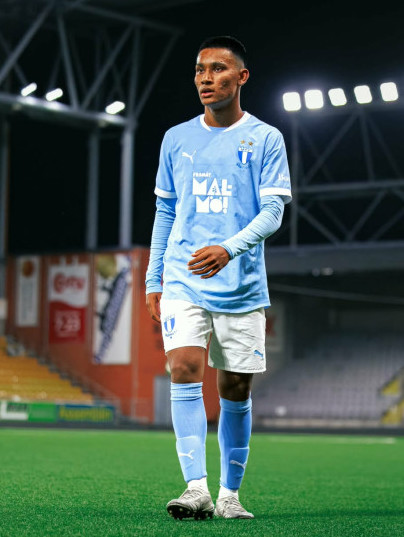
- Sashwat Rana (Nepali: शाश्‍वत राना)

Personal information
- Full name: Sashwat Shrees Rana
- Date of birth: 24 July 2007 (age 19)
- Place of birth: Copenhagen, Denmark
- Position: Defender

Team information
- Current team: Hellerup IK (on loan from Malmö FF)
- Number: 2

Youth career
- 2014–2019: Hellerup IK
- 2019–2021: Lyngby BK
- 2021–2023: FC Copenhagen
- 2024–2025: Malmö FF

Senior career*
Years	Team	Apps	(Gls)
2026–	Malmö FF	0	(0)
2026	→ BK Olympic (loan)	5	(0)
2026–	→ Hellerup IK (loan)	10	(0)
- * Club domestic league appearances and goals as of 21:00, 3 October 2026 (UTC)

Sashwat Shrees Rana (Nepali: शाश्‍वत राना मगर; born 24 July 2007) is a Danish professional footballer who plays as a defender for Danish 2nd Division side Hellerup IK, on loan from Malmö FF.

== Early life ==
Rana was born on 24 July 2007 in Copenhagen, Denmark. He is of Nepali descent through his parents, who hail from Baglung District of Gandaki Province in western Nepal. The son of a Nepali footballer father, he regarded Argentina international Lionel Messi and Brazil international Marcelo as his football idols growing up.

When he was thirteen he won the World Panna Championship 2020 Youth, a street football tournament.

== Career ==
As a youth player, Rana joined the youth academy of Danish side Hellerup IK at the age of seven. Following his stint there, he joined the youth academy of Danish side Lyngby Boldklub at the age of twelve. Two years later, he joined the youth academy of Danish side FC Copenhagen at the age of fourteen.

Ahead of the 2024 season, he joined the youth academy of Swedish side Malmö FF. After two years with the U19 team, he was promoted to the first team and subsequently loaned out to Ettan Södra club BK Olympic for the 2026 season. On 9 May 2026, he made his official senior debut coming on as a substitute in a 2–0 win against Kristianstad FC. After just a few months at Olympic the loan was cancelled, and Rana instead joined his boyhood club Hellerup IK on loan for the 2026–2027 season.

== Style of play ==
Rana plays as a defender; left-footed, he is known for his dribbling ability.
