= Mikkel Juhl Andersen =

Danish footballer (born 2000)

Personal information
- Full name: Mikkel Juhl Aagaard Andersen
- Date of birth: 29 January 2000 (age 26)
- Place of birth: Præstø, Denmark
- Height: 1.78 m (5 ft 10 in)
- Position: Right-back

Team information
- Current team: FC Roskilde
- Number: 2

Youth career
- Præstø IF
- –2016: Næstved
- 2016–2019: Silkeborg

Senior career*
Years	Team	Apps	(Gls)
2019–2022	Nykøbing	77	(6)
2022–2024	Lyngby	1	(0)
2023–2024	→ Fredericia (loan)	26	(1)
2024–	FC Roskilde	68	(1)
- * Club domestic league appearances and goals as of 3 October 2026

Mikkel Juhl Aagaard Andersen (born 29 January 2000) is a Danish footballer who plays as a right-back for Danish 2nd Division club FC Roskilde.

== Career ==
Born and raised in Præstø, Juhl Andersen moved away from home at an early age to start football college at Silkeborg IF at the age of 15, after starting his career at local club Præstø IF and later also playing for Næstved IF. Here he played on the club's U-17 team and later U-19 team, where he was captain.

After finishing his youth in Silkeborg, Juhl Andersen moved home to Præstø and started training with the Danish 1st Division club Nykøbing FC in the summer of 2019. A contract was eventually signed, and Andersen signed a deal until June 2021. Juhl Andersen quickly became a profile in Nykøbing, and after playing 53 games, crowned with 2 goals and 4 assists, he signed a new two-year contract in June 2021.

In June 2022, Danish Superliga club Lyngby Boldklub confirmed that they had bought Juhl Andersen, who signed a deal until June 2026. However, it was a very disappointing first season for Juhl Andersen, who played just an hour in a Danish Cup match in August 2022 and a few minutes in a Danish Superliga match in October 2022. He was benched for the rest of the season.

In July 2023, Juhl Andersen was loaned out to Danish 1st Division club FC Fredericia. Despite making 34 appearances for Fredericia, the parties did not extend the deal as Juhl struggled to earn a regular place in the team.

In the summer of 2024, Juhl Andersen moved to the newly promoted Danish 1st Division club FC Roskilde, where he signed a deal until June 2026. He extended his contract with the club on 12 June 2026, so it runs for two more years.
