= Alexander Lyng =

Danish footballer (born 2004)

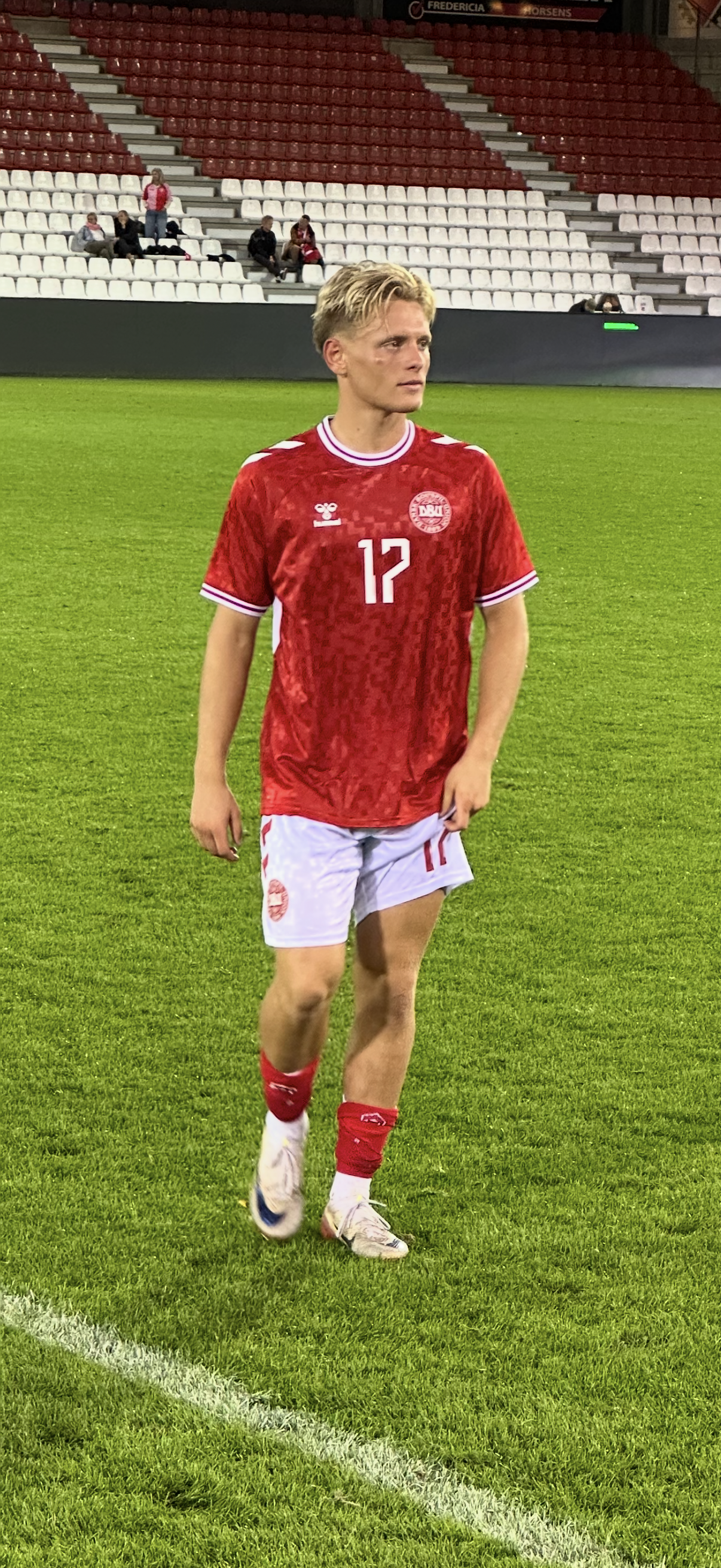

Personal information
- Full name: Alexander Lyng
- Date of birth: 26 November 2004 (age 21)
- Place of birth: Copenhagen, Denmark
- Height: 1.77 m (5 ft 10 in)
- Position: Winger

Team information
- Current team: Fredericia
- Number: 7

Youth career
- Hørsholm-Usserød
- Helsingør

Senior career*
Years	Team	Apps	(Gls)
2021–2023	Helsingør	47	(11)
2023–2025	Servette	0	(0)
2023–2024	→ Servette II	17	(1)
2024–2025	→ Sønderjyske (loan)	23	(3)
2025–2026	Sønderjyske	28	(3)
2026–	Fredericia	3	(1)

International career^{‡}
2021–2022	Denmark U18	11	(5)
2022–2023	Denmark U19	9	(1)
2023–2025	Denmark U20	6	(3)
2025	Denmark U21	1	(0)
- * Club domestic league appearances and goals as of 5 September 2026 ‡ National team caps and goals as of 15 June 2025

Alexander Lyng (born 26 November 2004) is a Danish professional footballer who plays as a winger for Danish Superliga club Fredericia.

== Club career ==
=== FC Helsingør ===
Lyng moved from his childhood club Hørsholm-Usserød, also known as HUI, to FC Helsingør as a youngster. On his 15th birthday on 26 November 2019, he signed with FC Helsingør on a youth contract.

Lyng impressed in the 2020/21 season in the youth ranks, scoring 22 goals in 21 games for Helsingør U-17 and 9 goals in 8 games for U-19. He started training with the first team in the 2021/22 season. After a training match where Lyng scored twice against Lyngby Boldklub in the summer kick-off, Lyng was permanently promoted to the first team squad and extended his contract with Helsingør until June 2023.

Lyng made his official debut for FC Helsingør on 23 July 2021, in the Danish 1st Division - the first match of the 2021/22 season - against Fremad Amager, where he became the youngest debutant in Helsingør's history at 16 years and 239 days. In the following match against Esbjerg fB, Lyng also became the youngest goal scorer in the club's history when he got on the scoresheet. In both the 2021–22 and 2022–23 seasons, Lyng, despite his young age, was a big profile in the team, and in the 2022–23 season the 18-year-old winger also became the club's top scorer with 11 goals in all competitions.

=== Servette FC ===
On 20 June 2023, it was confirmed that Helsingør had sold Lyng to Swiss Super League club Servette FC, in what became a record deal for Helsingør. He signed a 3-year deal until June 2026. According to the media Tipsbladet, Lyng was bought for a price between two and three million Danish kroner.

Lyng started up with Servette's first team in the pre-season 2023–24, where he both played and scored in training matches. Lyng was in the starting line-up for Servette, where he both played and scored in the pre-season training matches. He was then injured and was out for three months before he was back on the training pitch. After the injury, Lyng played primarily for the club's reserve team in the Swiss Promotion League, and was on the bench for the club's first team in some matches, though without playing a single minute for them in the 2023–24 season.

==== Loan to Sønderjyske ====
On 29 May 2024, newly promoted Danish Superliga club Sønderjyske confirmed that Lyng joined the club on a one-year loan deal with an option to buy.

Lyng's official debut for Sønderjyske came in the first round of the 2024-25 Danish Superliga on 21 July 2024, against Silkeborg IF, where he was in the starting lineup.

=== Sønderjyske ===
On 3 May 2025, Lyng and Sønderjyske made the deal permanent, on a three-year contract.

=== Fredericia ===
Lyng signed a four-year contract with Fredericia on 13 August 2026.
