= Sundby Boldklub =

Danish football club

Sundby BK
- Full name: Sundby Boldklub
- Nickname: Amagerkanerne
- Founded: 1922; 104 years ago
- Ground: Kløvermarkens Idrætsanlæg; Sundby Idrætspark (men's senior)
- Chairman: Bo Hammer
- Head coach: Thomas Karabulut
- League: Danish 3rd Division
- 2025–26: Danish 3rd Division, 8th of 12
- Website: https://www.sundbyboldklub.dk/
Home colours

Sundby Boldklub (abbreviated Sundby BK or SB) is a Danish football club based in the district of Sundby, Amager Vest, Copenhagen. As of the 2026–27 season, the club plays in 3rd Division, the fourth tier of the Danish football league system. The club plays home games at Kløvermarkens Idrætsanlæg while the men's senior plays at Sundby Idrætspark.

== History ==
The club was founded in 1922 as Boldklubben af 1922. After some time, the club decided to change their name to Boldklubben Sundby. In 1945, the club merged with a local team named IK Olympus, creating Sundby Boldklub. In 2015, the club was awarded football club of the year in Copenhagen. At the end of the 2023–24 season, the club ended in a 1st place in the promotion group, meaning that the club would play in the Danish divisions for the first time ever.

== Current squad ==
As of 10 September 2026

Note: Flags indicate national team as defined under FIFA eligibility rules; some limited exceptions apply. Players may hold more than one non-FIFA nationality.

No.	Pos.	Nation	Player
1	GK	GER	Nicolas Harksen
2	DF	DEN	Magnus Langhorn
3	DF	DEN	Frederik Skov Christensen
4	DF	DEN	Magnus Vandal
5	DF	DEN	Mads Jørgensen
6	MF	DEN	Johan Becker
7	FW	DEN	Casper Illum
8	MF	DEN	Nicklas Bondo
9	FW	DEN	Magnus Krogh
10	FW	DEN	Giran Pyne-Cole
11	FW	DEN	Noah Jakobsen
12	FW	DEN	Elias Eriksen
13	MF	DEN	Nicolai Jacobsen

No.	Pos.	Nation	Player
14	MF	DEN	Rasmus Fink Hansen
15	DF	DEN	Mikail Ergin
16	DF	DEN	Gustav Frederiksen
17	FW	DEN	Lauge Carstensen
18	DF	DEN	Oliver Karlsen
19	FW	DEN	Karlo Trkulja
20	MF	DEN	Mohamed Belmaillah
21	DF	DEN	Miran Cengiz
23	FW	DEN	Gustav Street
24	GK	DEN	Lucas Poulsen
25	DF	DEN	Benjamin Juel-Berg
26	GK	DEN	Dimitrije Jensen

== Grounds ==
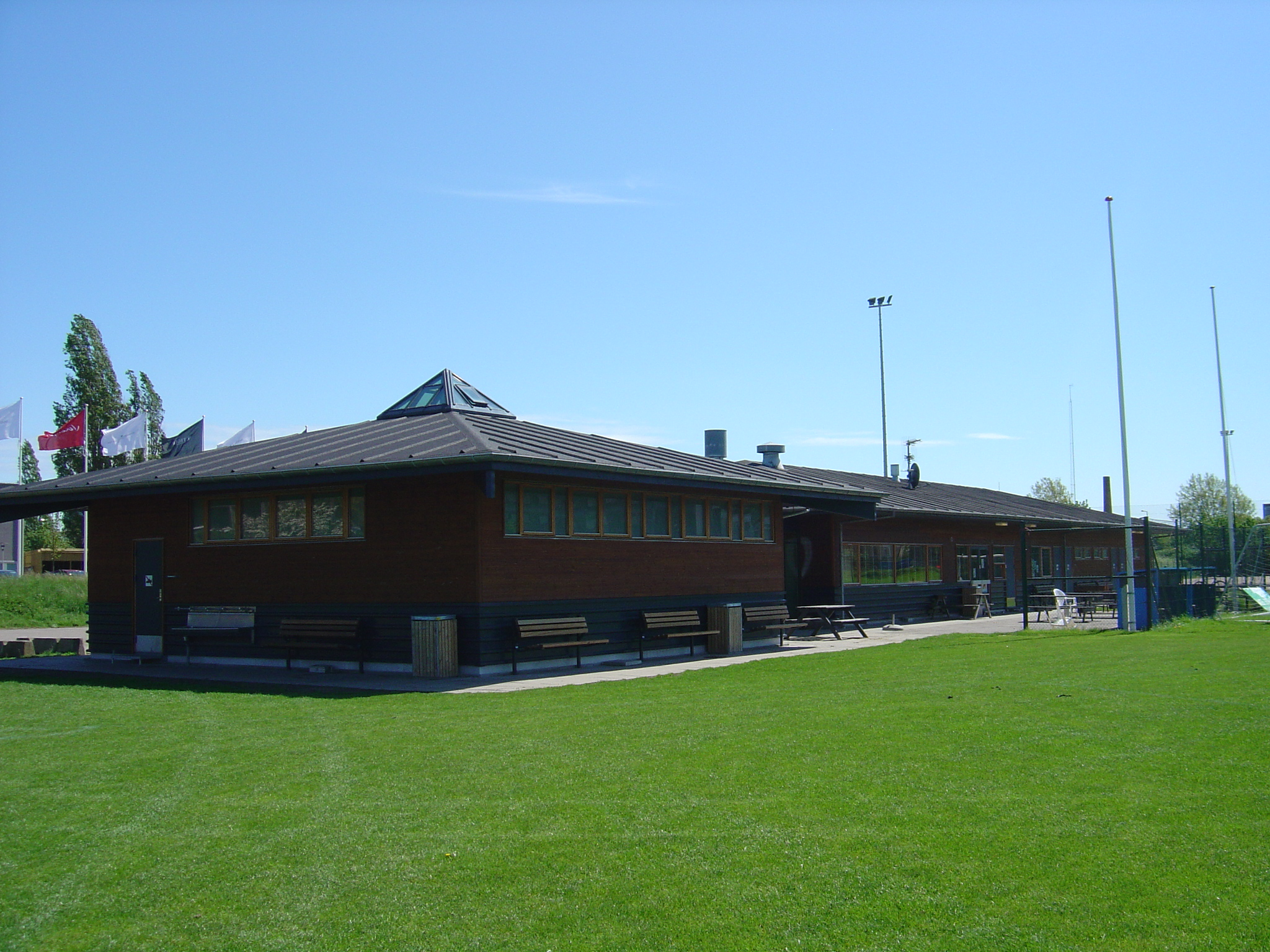
The clubhouse of Sundby Boldklub

Sundby Boldklub started playing at a pitch located in Amager Common, which had a rocky substrate. In 1973, the club got the allowance to play at Amagerbro Idrætsanlæg (demolished now). In the beginning of the 2000s, the club moved from Amagerbro Idrætsanlæg to Kløvermarkens Idrætsanlæg.

== Personnel ==
=== Current technical staff ===
Position	Name
Head coach	Thomas Karabulut
Assistant coach	Karim Graini
Assistant coach	Rami Jiowda
Physiotherapist	Allan Corneliussen
Goalkeeping coach	Marc Jensen
Physical coach	Victor Hounou
