= Hørsholm-Usserød IK =

Association football club in Rungsted

Hørsholm-Usserød
- Full name: Hørsholm-Usserød Idrætsklub
- Short name: HUI
- Founded: 1962; 64 years ago
- Ground: Hørsholm Idrætspark, Rungsted
- Capacity: 5,000 (300 seated)
- Chairman: Bo Rømer Ottenheim
- Manager: Christian Mouroux; Thomas Loran
- League: Danish 3rd Division
- 2025–26: Danish 3rd Division, 6th of 12
- Website: hui-fodbold.dk
Home colours

Hørsholm-Usserød Idrætsklub, widely known as HUI or HUI Fodbold, is a Danish football club based in Rungsted, north of Copenhagen. The club competes in the Danish 3rd Division, the fourth tier of the Danish football league system, having gained promotion to divisional football for the first time in its history in 2025.

Founded in 1962 through the merger of the Hørsholm and Usserød clubs, HUI functions as an umbrella organisation that also encompasses a handball section; a gymnastics section operated alongside football and handball until 2024. The club has approximately 1,400 members and 150 coaches and administrators across all age groups, making it one of the larger amateur football clubs in Denmark. Its home ground is Hørsholm-Usserød Idrætspark, situated in Rungsted. The Danish Football Association (DBU) awarded the club two licence stars in 2024 in recognition of its youth development work.

HUI is primarily known beyond North Zealand as the childhood club of Rasmus Højlund, who grew up in Hørsholm and began his career at the club before joining FC Copenhagen, and later representing, Manchester United and Napoli as well as the Denmark national team, among others. His twin brothers Emil and Oscar Højlund, both professional footballers, also began their careers at HUI.

== History ==
Hørsholm-Usserød Idrætsklub was founded in 1962 through the merger of the Hørsholm and Usserød local sports clubs. The football section developed as a grassroots organisation serving Hørsholm Municipality. For much of its early history the club competed in the lower tiers of the regional Danish pyramid, and its best results in national cup competition have been reaching the third round of the Danish Cup on several occasions. The most recent of these came in 2022–23, when HUI defeated B73 and Tune before losing 2–1 at home to AC Horsens of the Danish Superliga in the third round.

In 2009, HUI entered a collaborative arrangement with the nearby Nivå-Kokkedal Fodboldklub to form a joint senior side, FC Øresund, which entered the Zealand Series, the highest division administered by DBU Zealand. The new entity secured promotion to the Denmark Series—the fifth tier of Danish football—in 2010, and went on to finish fourth in the 2011–12 Denmark Series season. The partnership was dissolved in 2015.

The end of the FC Øresund arrangement was followed by a period of decline for HUI's senior side. Relegation to Serie 1 came in 2017, and to Serie 2 in 2018. The club then reversed its fortunes rapidly: promotion back to Serie 1 was secured in 2019, followed by a return to the Zealand Series in 2020, and promotion to the Denmark Series in the summer of 2023, ending an eight-year absence from that level.

The club's greatest competitive achievement came in June 2025, when HUI defeated ASA from Aarhus 4–1 on aggregate in the promotion play-off—winning 1–0 in the first leg and 3–1 in the second—to gain admission to the Danish 3rd Division for the 2025–26 season, the first occasion in the club's history that it had competed at divisional level.

== Current squad ==
As of 10 September 2026

Note: Flags indicate national team as defined under FIFA eligibility rules; some limited exceptions apply. Players may hold more than one non-FIFA nationality.

No.	Pos.	Nation	Player
1	GK	DEN	Anders Tønnesen
2	MF	DEN	Emil Walløe
3	DF	DEN	Mathias Engell
5	FW	DEN	Osama Murshed
6	MF	DEN	Robin Aarup Jørgensen
7	DF	DEN	Gabriel Petersen
8	MF	DEN	Louie Helmi
9	FW	DEN	Anas Al-Hummadi
10	FW	DEN	Georg Kirkeby
11	MF	DEN	Khalid Al-Ali
12	MF	DEN	Huzaifa Khan
13	DF	DEN	Markus Menck
14	MF	DEN	Emil Sørensen

No.	Pos.	Nation	Player
15	MF	DEN	Noah Fazal
16	DF	DEN	Oliver Veggerby
17	MF	DEN	Nikolaos Larsen
18	FW	DEN	Alexander Hvid
19	FW	DEN	Gustav Holm
20	MF	DEN	William Knudsen
21	MF	ESP	Iago Meijide
22	GK	DEN	Hjalte Dalsgaard
23	FW	DEN	Nicolaj Fihl
24	DF	DEN	Oliver Wettergren
25	DF	DEN	Carl-Emil Husmer
27	FW	DEN	Mikkel Norling
30	GK	DEN	Marco Grønholdt

== Ground ==
HUI play their home matches at Hørsholm-Usserød Idrætspark, Stadion Allé 5B, 2960 Rungsted Kyst. The stadium forms part of a broader sports park serving Hørsholm Municipality.

== Youth development and notable alumni ==
HUI's youth programme was formally recognised by the Danish Football Association (DBU) in 2024 with the award of two DBU licence stars. Since January 2025 the club has maintained a strategic partnership with FC Nordsjælland.

The club is the childhood home of Rasmus Højlund (born 2003), who left for Brøndby at the age of approximately eleven, just before the threshold at which FIFA training compensation entitlements begin. As a result, HUI received no compensation from his subsequent transfer to Manchester United in 2023 for an initial fee of £64 million. The club's talent director, Christian Mouroux, told Tipsbladet: "Of course it would have been fantastic for the club if we had been entitled to some compensation. But we do not regret anything." The club does, however, expect to receive training compensation from transfers involving Højlund's twin brothers, Emil and Oscar Højlund (born 2004), both of whom remained at HUI until under-14 level before joining FC Copenhagen's academy. Both subsequently transferred to Bundesliga clubs in 2024.

Other notable alumni include Alexander Lyng (born 2004), who joined FC Helsingør and was sold to Servette FC in June 2023 in what was a record transfer for Helsingør; women's international Sofie Svava (born 2000), who played junior football for HUI before becoming a Danish international with clubs including Olympique Lyon; and Josefine Hasbo, a Denmark women's international who played collegiate football in the United States.
