= Vejgaard Boldspilklub =

Danish association football club

Vejgaard
- Full name: Vejgaard Boldspilklub
- Founded: 11 November 1925; 100 years ago
- Ground: Soffy Road; Vejgaard, Aalborg, Denmark
- Manager: Mark Rusborg Westergaard
- League: Denmark Series
- 2025–26: Danish 3rd Division, 10th of 12 (relegated)
- Website: vejgaard-bk.dk
Home colours

Vejgaard Boldspilklub, simply known as Vejgaard B, is an association football club based in Vejgaard, a suburb of Aalborg, Denmark, that competes in the Denmark Series, the fifrth tier of the Danish football league system. Founded in 1925, it is more simply known as 'Vejgaard BK' or 'VB'. The team plays its home matches at Soffy Road.

The club hosts an annual youth cup, VB Efterårs Cup, which is held the weekend before the Danish autumn holiday and is for under-13 teams and younger.

Vejgaard Boldspilklub has historically been one of Aalborg's less prominent sides, with mainly AaB, but also Aalborg Chang, Lindholm IF and Nørresundby Boldklub having had a more illustrious past. They reached their first promotion into the Danish divisions in 2016.

== History ==
=== Early history ===
Vejgaard Boldspilklub was founded on 11 November 1925 by barber Hans Hansen, who became the club's first chairman, and parish administrator K. Kjeldsteen. Its first home ground was Vejgaard Stadion, popularly called Hullet ("The Hole"). During the 1950s, Ove Flindt Bjerg, who would later play for Wacker Innsbruck, Karlsruher SC and the San Jose Earthquakes, played for Vejgaard's youth teams. During this period, the club competed in the Jutland Series, the highest regional division of the Danish football pyramid.

In March 1980, plans for a new stadium were initiated on a local municipal level. These were approved on 14 April by Aalborg mayor Marius Andersen and became effective as of 15 September 1980. The plans would eventually lead to the construction of Soffy Road, the home ground of Vejgaard Boldspilklub today.

=== Into the third tier (2016–present) ===
On 25 June 2016, the club reached promotion to the Danish 2nd Division, the third tier of Danish football, for the first time in their history after beating Kastrup Boldklub 1–0 in the final match of promotion play-offs. The matchwinner, forward Martin Sloth-Hansen who had played for Vejgaard for 16 years, scored the winner deep into extra time. The promotion meant that Vejgaard had achieved successive promotions, after having promoted to the Denmark Series, the fourth tier of Danish football, the year prior.

In May 2017, head coach Henrik Larsen decided to step down from his position at the end of the 2016–17 season. Vejgaard would go on to suffer relegation to the Denmark Series in its first season in the Danish 2nd Division after ending 11th out of 12 in the relegation group league table. In June 2017, the club appointed Christian Flindt Bjerg as their new head coach, who had until then coached the AGF Under-19 team. Following the relegation, Vejgaard lost their top goalscorer Frederik Poulsen to Faroe side ÍF Fuglafjarðar as well as midfielder Zander Hyltoft and utility player Mads Steffens to Jammerbugt FC.

After one season in the Denmark Series, Vejgaard reached promotion back to the Danish 2nd Division as winners of Group 4, which became a fact after a 1–0 win over Viby IF. They were placed in Group 1 of the 2nd Division prior to the 2018–19 season. In December 2018, halfway into the season, Vejgaard promoted former team captain Nicki Fischer to assistant coach to manager Flindt Bjerg. The team ended in seventh place out of 12 in the group, eight points from Ringkøbing IF at sixth place, which meant that they would once again play in the relegation group in the spring. Vejgaard had a strong start to the relegation group, winning 1–0 over BK Marienlyst in the first match on 22 April 2019. In May, head coach Flindt Bjerg signed a two-year contract extension as he looked to salvage Vejgaard from another relegation. On 1 June, the club eventually secured another season in the third tier after a 2–0 home win at Soffy Road over FC Sydvest 05; their third consecutive win. Vejgaard ended fifth in the relegation group, eight points from Odder IGF in the relegation zone.

After the season, director of sports Steen Bukdahl announced his departure from his position – his replacement became Søren Andersen, who signed a one-and-a-half-year deal. Vejgaard also lost two first-team profiles to local rivals Thisted FC: midfielders Nicolai Rask Lassen and Mathias Andersen, who signed professional contracts there. Despite an impressive spring season, head coach Flindt Bjerg stated that the main aim for the 2019–20 season would be avoiding relegation from the third tier. The first match of the season ended in a 1–3 away win over Middelfart Boldklub after playing from 1–0 behind after only two minutes. After a good start to the season, Vejgaard went into a slump, losing eight matches in a row. In March 2020, the season was affected by the COVID-19 pandemic. At that point, Vejgaard was last in the Group 2 table with 11 points from 17 matches and only two wins to 10 losses for the season.

After the restart, Vejgaard did not manage to turn around their season, and after losing 2–4 to FA 2000 on 4 July, the club suffered relegation to the Denmark Series after ending 11th in the relegation group. Following relegation, head coach Flindt Bjerg left to become assistant coach at Danish 1st Division club Skive IK. Nickolaj Jonstrup, who had until then been managing Nørresundby FB, was named as his successor.
