= Roskilde Idrætspark =

Danish football stadium

- Interactive map of Roskilde Idrætspark
- Location: Radmandshaven 10; 4000 Roskilde, Denmark
- Coordinates: 55°38′13″N 12°04′21″E
- Owner: FC Roskilde
- Capacity: 6,000
- Surface: Grass
- Field size: 102 x 65

Tenant
- FC Roskilde

Roskilde Idrætspark is a Danish football stadium and the home ground of FC Roskilde. It has a capacity of 6,000 of which 512 are covered seating

The stadium has a record attendance of 5,342 spectators on 30 October 2014 for a match between FC Roskilde and F.C. Copenhagen in the third round of the 2014–15 Danish Cup.

== See also ==
- FC Roskilde
- List of football stadiums in Denmark
