= Frederiksberg Idrætspark =

Multi-purpose stadium in Denmark

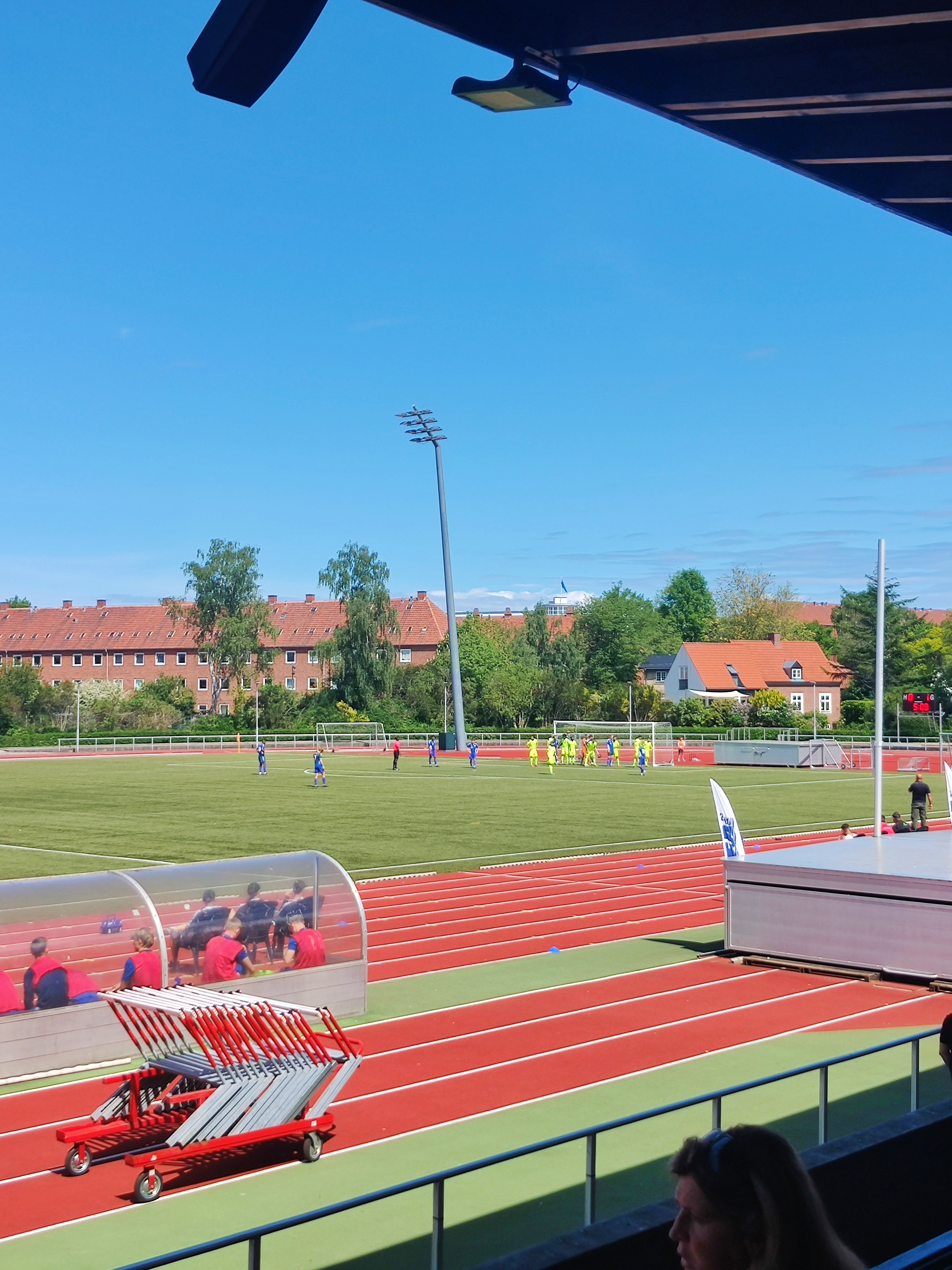
- Frederiksberg Idrætspark in 2023
- Interactive map of Frederiksberg Idrætspark
- Full name: Frederiksberg Idrætspark
- Location: Sønderjyllands Allé 4 DK-2000 Frederiksberg
- Coordinates: 55°40′48″N 12°29′53″E
- Owner: Frederiksberg Municipality
- Capacity: 5,000 (1,008 seated)
- Surface: Artificial turf
- Record attendance: 7,000 (Kjøbenhavns Boldklub vs AaB, 1952)

Construction
- Groundbreaking: 1919
- Built: 1924
- Opened: 21 June 1927
- Renovated: 1983

Tenants
- Kjøbenhavns Boldklub (KB); FA 2000

Frederiksberg Idrætspark, also known as Frederiksberg Stadion, is a multi-purpose stadium in Frederiksberg, Capital Region of Denmark, Denmark. It is home to FA 2000, who currently compete in the Danish 2nd Division. It is also home to Kjøbenhavns Boldklub (KB), a parent club to FC Copenhagen, and the latter also use the stadium as a training ground.

== History ==
The groundbreaking of Frederiksberg Idrætspark occurred in 1919, but only in 1924 did the stadium host events. The venue was officially inaugurated on 21 June 1927, and had already the previous years been utilised as a ground for football by clubs such as Brønshøj Boldklub.

During the glory days of Kjøbenhavns Boldklub (KB) in the 1970s and 1980s, Frederiksberg Idrætspark hosted European matches, which saw clubs such as Dinamo Tbilisi, Dundee United and Fortuna Sittard guest the stadium in the 1977–78 UEFA Cup and 1984–85 European Cup Winners' Cup, respectively. Finn Laudrup, father of Brian Laudrup and Michael Laudrup, scored in the match against Dinamo Tbilisi on Frederiksberg Idrætspark.

In June 2013, the Frederikberg municipal council decided to install artificial turf and lighting for a total amount of DKK 7.5 million at Frederiksberg Idrætspark, which would allow the stadium to be used more during the winter.

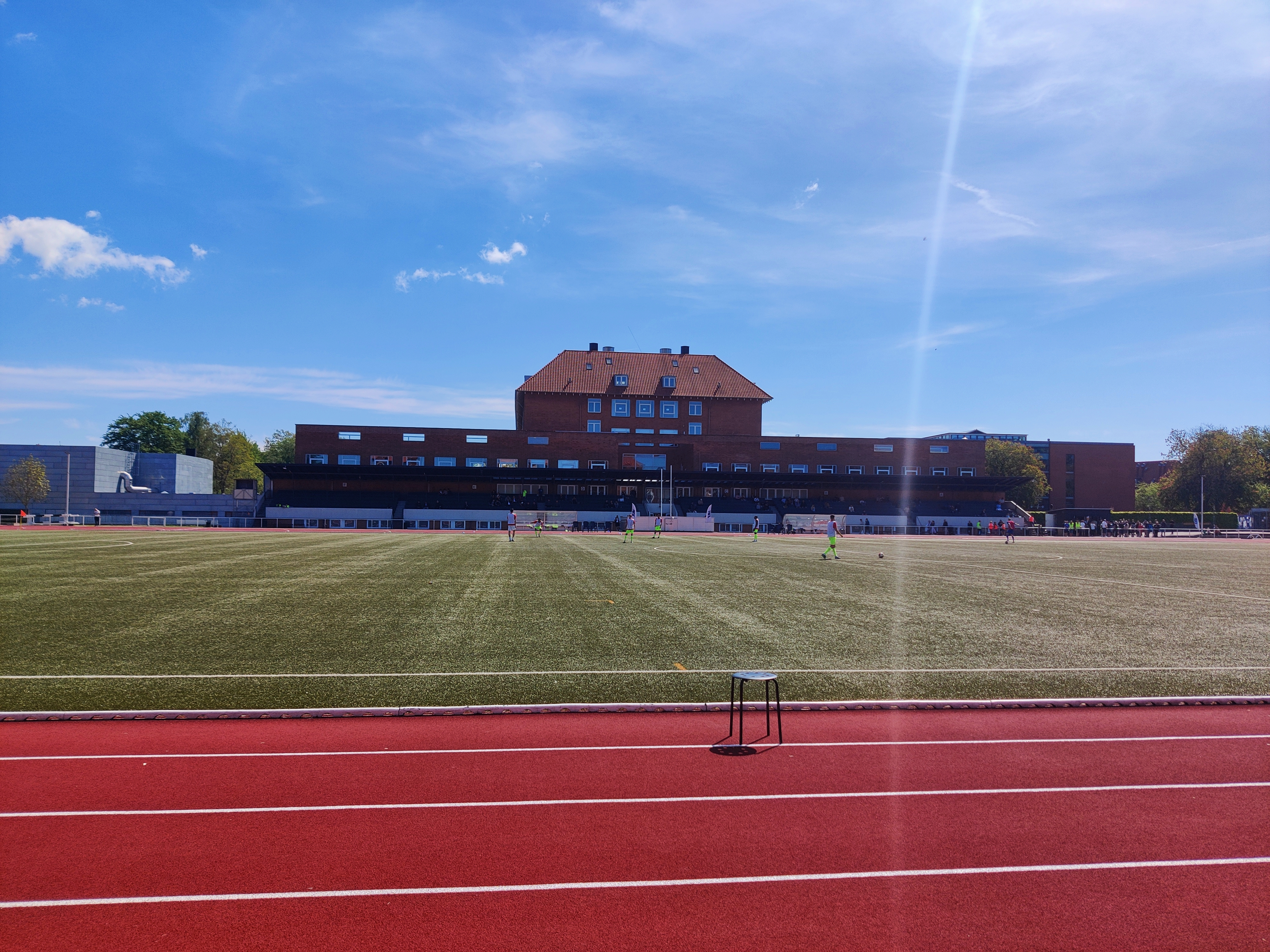
Frederiksberg Idrætspark during a Danish 3rd Division match between FA 2000 and Ishøj IF in May 2023.
