= Næsby Stadium =

Football stadium in Denmark

ALPI Arena Næsby
- Interactive map of ALPI Arena Næsby
- Full name: ALPI Arena Næsby
- Former names: Næsby Stadion (1984–present); ALPI Arena Næsby (2016–present)
- Location: Stærehusvej 31; DK-5270 Odense N
- Coordinates: 55°25′59″N 10°20′24″E
- Capacity: 2,500
- Surface: Natural grass
- Record attendance: 871 (1995)
- Field size: 104 by 65 metres (113.7 yd × 71.1 yd)

Construction
- Built: 1984

Tenant
- Næsby Boldklub (1984–present)

Næsby Stadium (Danish: Næsby Stadion) is an association football stadium located in Kirkendrup in the northern part of Odense, Denmark. It has been the home ground of 2nd Division club Næsby Boldklub since its construction in 1984. Besides the stadium, which has a capacity of 2,500, the ground also includes an artificial pitch, a playground, a street football pitch, outdoor fitness as well as the cafeteria Den Blå Café. In May 2016 it was renamed ALPI Arena Næsby, after the naming rights were acquired by logistics company, ALPI.
