= Sparekassen Thy Arena =

Sports venue in Thisted, Denmark

Sparekassen Thy Arena Lerpytter Stadium
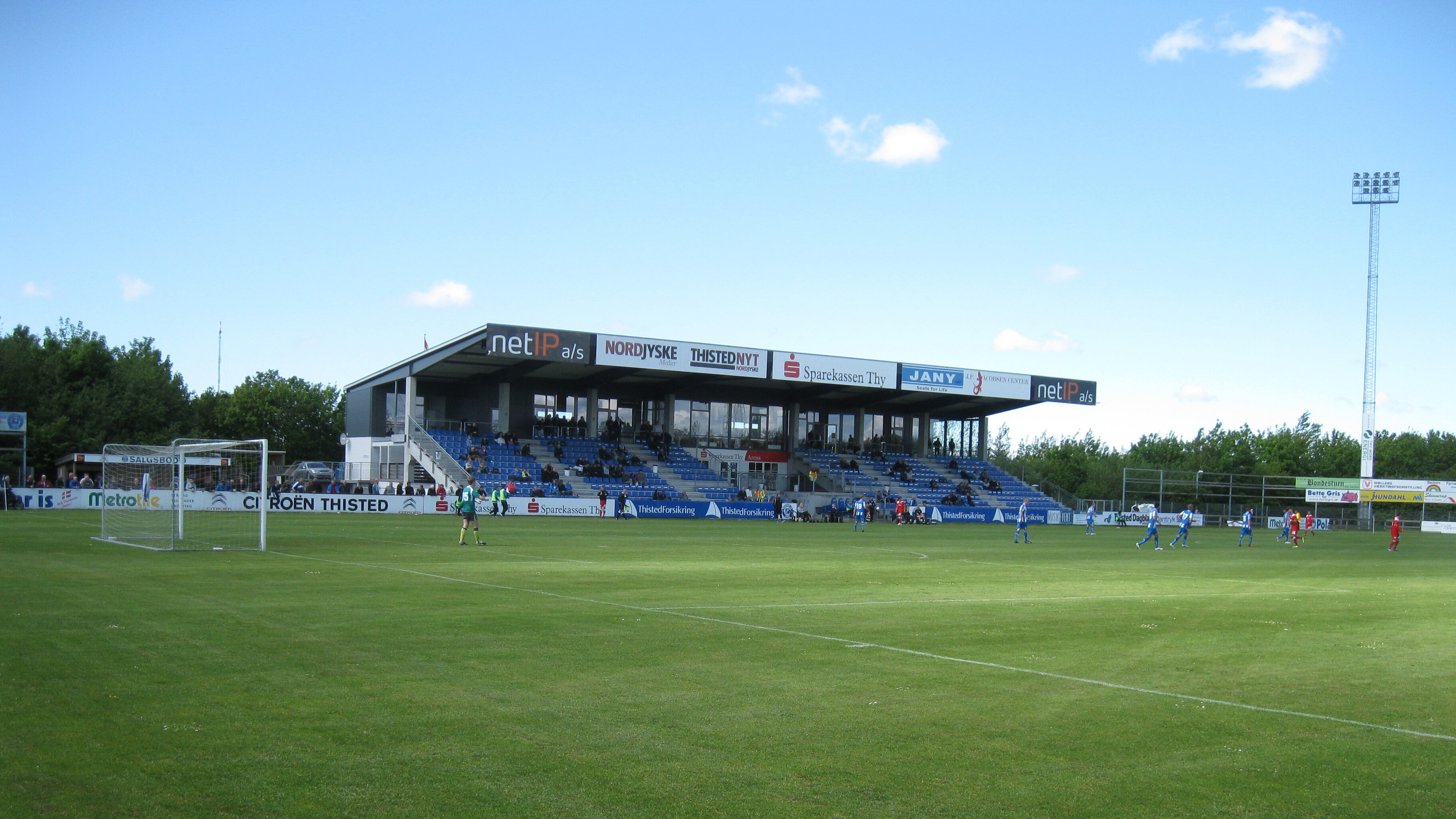
- Sparekassen Thy Arena in 2012
- Interactive map of Sparekassen Thy Arena; Lerpytter Stadium
- Full name: Sparekassen Thy Arena
- Location: Thisted, Denmark
- Coordinates: 56°58′05″N 8°42′09″E
- Capacity: 4,000
- Field size: 105 x 68 m

Construction
- Opened: 1988; 38 years ago
- Expanded: 2007–2008

Tenants
- Thisted FC (1989–present); FC Thy-Thisted Q (2017–present)

Sparekassen Thy Arena, formerly known as Lerpytter Stadium, is a football stadium in Thisted, Denmark. It has been the home stadium of Thisted FC since their formation in 1989. The women's team FC Thy-Thisted Q made the stadium their home upon their foundation in 2017. It has a current capacity of 4,000.

== History ==
=== Early football in Thisted (1910s–1930s) ===
Organised football in Thisted emerged during the interwar period, as the football division of Thisted Idrætsklub (TIK) grew to between 150 and 200 members. Matches were initially played on a gravel pitch, but in 1919, the club relocated to the local fairgrounds (Dyrskuepladsen), transporting their clubhouse—reportedly carried by around 50 members—from the Dragsbæk neighborhood.

While the fairground pitch was an improvement, conditions remained substandard, with limited space and unsanitary changing facilities. In the mid-1920s, growing dissatisfaction prompted efforts to secure a more suitable venue.

=== Dragsbæk ground and pre-Lerpytter era (1937–1988) ===
Following public and club pressure, Thisted City Council approved the development of a new ground in a disused gravel pit in Dragsbæk, which was municipally owned. Additional land was acquired for training and match pitches, and construction was carried out by club volunteers.

The new facility was inaugurated in 1937 with a match against Aalborg Chang, drawing approximately 3,000 spectators—roughly one-third of the town's population. The occasion also marked a change in the club's kit, from blue shirts and white shorts to blue-and-white striped shirts with blue shorts. This ground remained in use for over five decades and served as the primary venue for football in Thisted.

=== Construction of Lerpytter Stadium (1988) ===
In 1988, the football division of Thisted Idrætsklub (TIK) relocated to a newly developed complex on Lerpyttervej in western Thisted, known as Lerpytter Idrætscenter. The stadium, named Lerpytter Stadium, derives its name from the lerpytter (clay pits) that once characterised the area. That year also marked a significant organisational shift, as the football division separated from TIK to establish Thisted FC, allowing for independent sponsorship and administration.

=== Modern developments (2006–present) ===
In 2006, Lerpytter Stadium recorded its highest attendance during a Danish Cup match against FC Copenhagen, with 5,813 spectators in attendance. Despite a 4–1 defeat to the home team, the match is notably remembered for an injury sustained by Copenhagen's Jacob Neestrup, who was sidelined for eight months and later retired after playing fewer than 20 senior matches.

A major renovation project began in 2007, supported by a DKK 5 million grant from Thisted City Council and an additional DKK 11 million raised by the local business community. In 2008, the stadium was officially renamed Sparekassen Thy Arena following a sponsorship agreement. That same year, a new covered stand with seating for 754 spectators was constructed.

Today, Sparekassen Thy Arena has a regular capacity of approximately 4,000 spectators, with additional temporary stands used for high-profile matches able to bring capacity up to 6,000 spectators.
