= ASA Fodbold =

Danish football club

ASA
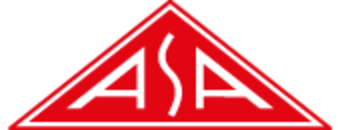
- Full name: Arbejder Sport Aarhus Fodbold
- Nickname: Klubben i centrum (The club in the centre)
- Short name: ASA
- Founded: 22 April 1933; 93 years ago
- Ground: Robotize Park, Aarhus
- Chairman: Jesper Emborg
- Head coach: Lennart Lindsted
- League: 3rd Division
- 2025–26: Denmark Series, Group 2, 2nd of 10 (promoted)
- Website: www.asa-fodbold.dk
Home colours

Arbejder Sport Aarhus Fodbold, commonly known as ASA Fodbold, is the association football department of the multi-sports club ASA, based in the neighbourhood of Frederiksbjerg, Aarhus, Denmark. Founded in 1933, the club mainly features football. Currently, the ASA's first men's team plays in the Denmark Series, the fifth tier of the Danish football league system, after reaching successive promotions in 2019 and 2021. In 2025 the women's team won the B-Liga, the second tier of Danish football.

ASA is the largest football club within Ringgaden (Ring 1) in Aarhus, defining the inner city. This led to the club's nickname, "Klubben i centrum" ("The club in the centre"). The club has around 250 senior members and 320 youth members, making it one of the larger clubs in Aarhus.

== History ==
In the 1930s, the Social Democrats had, as part of their cultural policy, which included a goal to end "bourgeoisie" elite sports, formed Dansk Arbejder Idræt (DAI). In short, the workers could meet each other under friendly conditions, and had loosely organised people to travel around the country to start workers' clubs. This is how ASA also started. ASA stands for Arbejder Sport Aarhus ("Worker's Sports Aarhus") and was founded after a month diligent agitation in the social democrat newspaper Demokraten. Subsequently, the Social Democratic Youth of Denmark called De Unges Idræt og Arbejdernes Oplysnings Forbund ("Youth Sports and the Workers' Enlightenment Association") to convene at the founding general assembly on 22 April 1933. Approximately 200 people had turned up to become members, and already the following week the first practice started on an allotted track between Aarhus Municipal Hospital and Nordre Cemetery. The contingent fee was DKK 1 per month and 50 øre for the unemployed. The club's social democratic background quickly helped provide grounds and pitches for football.

One of ASA's first chairmen was Orla Hyllested, who later became Mayor of Aarhus. As a result of the above social democrat connections, ASA already moved to its current grounds at the borough of Frederiksbjerg in 1934–35.

In June 2026, ASA was promoted for the first time to division-level football in Denmark.

== Current squad ==
As of 10 September 2026

Note: Flags indicate national team as defined under FIFA eligibility rules; some limited exceptions apply. Players may hold more than one non-FIFA nationality.

No.	Pos.	Nation	Player
1	GK	DEN	Frederik Nørgaard
2	DF	DEN	Anders Nicolaisen
3	DF	DEN	Phillip Mundt
4	MF	DEN	Thomas Sønnichsen
5	DF	DEN	Sebastian Mathiassen
6	MF	DEN	Markus Andersen
7	MF	DEN	Alexander Plagborg
8	MF	DEN	Andreas Lauridsen
9	MF	DEN	Jeppe Paulsen
10	MF	DEN	Mads Egelind
11	FW	DEN	Emil Horslund
12	DF	DEN	Christian Jørgensen
13	MF	DEN	Magnus Nicolaisen
14	FW	DEN	Jonas Buch Dahl
15	MF	DEN	William Jensen

No.	Pos.	Nation	Player
16	MF	DEN	Elias Jønson
17	FW	DEN	William Saleh Svendsen
18	GK	DEN	Marc Ahrendsen
18	GK	DEN	Mads Mortensen
19	DF	DEN	Christian Pinholt
20	MF	DEN	Daniel Kristoffersen
21	DF	DEN	Jesper Broberg
22	DF	DEN	Jonas Dahl
23	FW	DEN	Kasper Bank
24	DF	DEN	Nikolaj Ellegård
25	DF	DEN	Mads Frandsen
26	MF	DEN	Jonas Hagemann-Madsen
27	MF	DEN	Gustav Juulsen
28	DF	DEN	Christian Abildgaard

== See also ==
- ASA W, women's team
