= Vejgaard =

Neighborhood of Aalborg, Denmark

Coordinates: 57°2.5′N 9°57′E

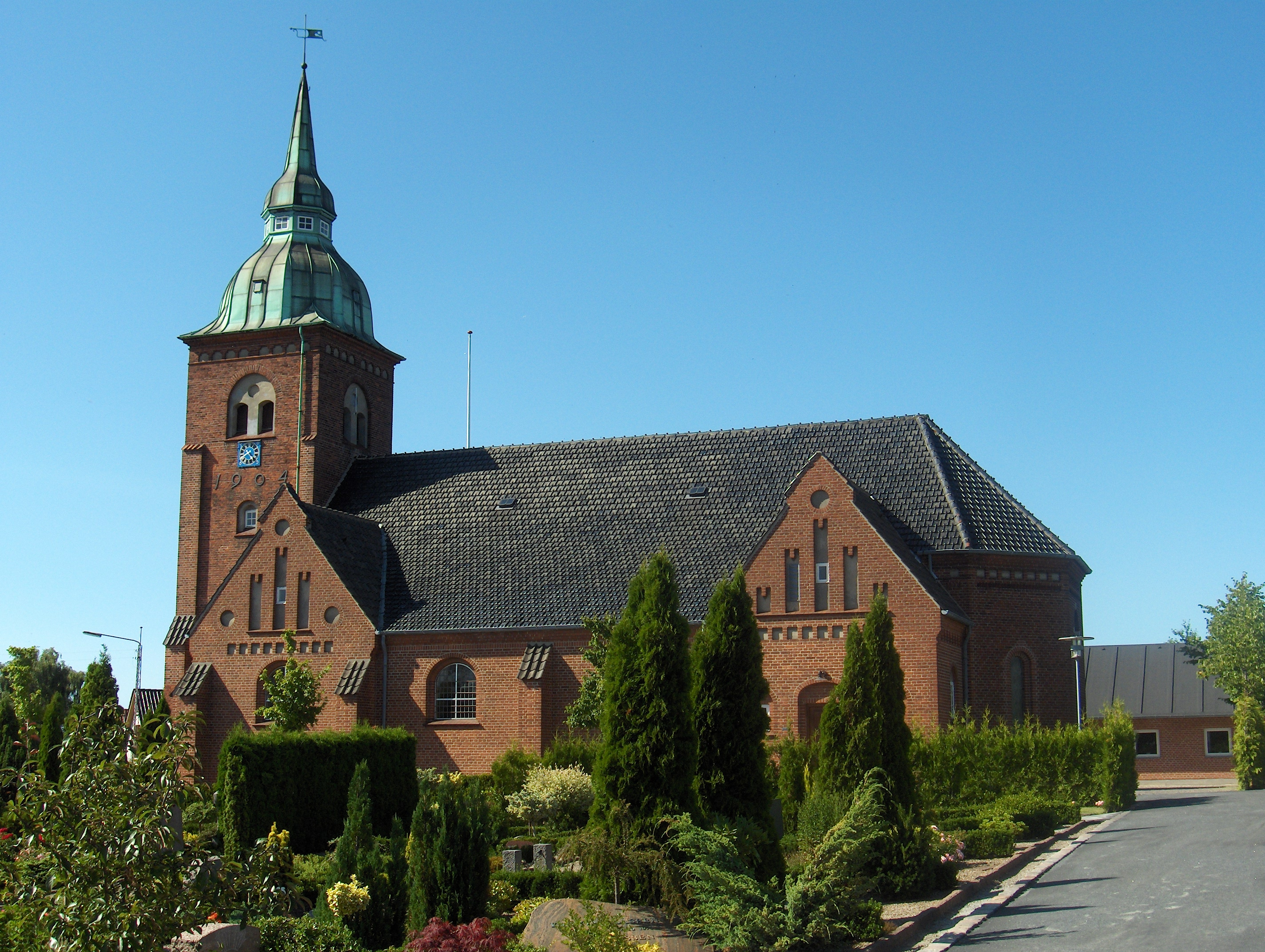
Vejgaard Church in Aalborg

Vejgaard is an eastern neighborhood of Aalborg, Denmark. It is located 3 kilometers east from Aalborg's city center.

== History ==
Vejgaard was originally a separate settlement from Aalborg, but as Aalborg rapidly grew in size Vejgaard was absorbed by the city.

== Notable people ==
- Niarn (1979-), rapper.
- legobygger123 (2006-) rapper and producer.
- OliverLyGaming (2006-) youtuber.
