= Helsingør Stadium =

Football stadium in Helsingør, Denmark

Helsingør Old Stadion
- Interactive map of Helsingør Old Stadion
- Location: Nordre Strandvej 11, A 3000 Helsingør, Denmark
- Coordinates: 56°02′48″N 12°35′46″E
- Owner: FC Helsingør
- Capacity: 4,000
- Surface: Grass
- Field size: 102 x 65

Construction
- Opened: 1 July 1923
- Renovated: 2019

Tenants
- FC Helsingør; Hillerød Fodbold (2023, 2025–2026)

Helsingør Stadium (Danish: Helsingør Stadion) is a football stadium in Helsingør, Denmark. It is the home ground of FC Helsingør. It has a capacity of 4.000 of which 1.000 are covered seating. The new stadium was built in 2019, while the older one used in the Superliga was demolished.

It was inaugurated on 1 July 1923 with a friendly against BK Frem.

Following FC Helsingør's promotion to the Danish Superliga for the first time in 2017, the club had to seek special dispensation to use Helsingør Stadium for top division matches. This was granted after the addition of temporary facilities and given the club's plans to construct a new stadium. The first Superliga match at the ground was against Odense Boldklub on 24 July 2017, with a record attendance of 3,984. Another new record was set on 17 September 2017, when 5,308 people watched Helsingør's Superliga match against F.C. Copenhagen.

== See also ==
- List of football stadiums in Denmark
