= Hellerup IK =

Danish sport club

HIK
- Full name: Hellerup Idræts Klub
- Short name: HIK
- Founded: 1900
- Ground: Gentofte Stadion, Copenhagen
- Capacity: 15,000
- Chairman: Søren Brøchner-Mortensen
- Manager: Anton Leifsson
- League: Danish 2nd Division
- 2025–26: Danish 2nd Division, 5th of 12
Home colours	Away colours

Hellerup IK or HIK is a Danish sport club from Hellerup. Their football team currently plays in the Danish 2nd Division, the third tier of the Danish football league system.

HIK consists also of a handball and a tennis section. The handball team won the Danish Handball Championship in the 1985–86 season.

== Current squad ==
As of 6 September 2026

Note: Flags indicate national team as defined under FIFA eligibility rules; some limited exceptions apply. Players may hold more than one non-FIFA nationality.

No.	Pos.	Nation	Player
1	GK	DEN	Magnus Haslund
2	DF	DEN	Sashwat Rana (on loan from Malmö)
3	DF	DEN	David Chernet
4	DF	DEN	Isak Pondor
6	MF	DEN	Mathias Jørgensen
8	MF	DEN	Jonas Damkjær
10	MF	DEN	Andreas Garly
11	FW	DEN	Jakob Johansson
12	FW	DEN	Nicklas Schandorph
13	FW	DEN	Mikkel Haakonsson
14	DF	DEN	Gustav Rossen
15	FW	DEN	Benjamin Lyng

No.	Pos.	Nation	Player
16	MF	DEN	August Wagner
17	DF	DEN	Benjamin Suner
18	MF	DEN	Malthe Hesselholt
20	MF	DEN	Berkay Sahin
21	FW	DEN	Ibrahim Nuur
23	MF	DEN	Frederik Valdbjørn
24	DF	DEN	William Adelsten
25	DF	DEN	Malcolm Tekoe
27	GK	DEN	Oliver Thorup
34	MF	ITA	Alessio Alicino
70	MF	DEN	Jonatan Rindom

=== Youth players in use 2026-27 ===
Note: Flags indicate national team as defined under FIFA eligibility rules; some limited exceptions apply. Players may hold more than one non-FIFA nationality.

No.	Pos.	Nation	Player

== Achievements ==
- 4 seasons in the Highest Danish League
- 25 seasons in the Second Highest Danish League
- 39 seasons in the Third Highest Danish League
