= FC Roskilde =

Danish football club

Coordinates: 55.637°N 12.0732°E

- Full name: Football Club Roskilde
- Short name: FCR
- Founded: 2004; 22 years ago
- Ground: Roskilde Idrætspark
- Capacity: 6,000 (512 seated)
- Chairman: Hans-Bo Hyldig
- Manager: Daniel Simacon
- League: Danish 2nd Division
- 2025–26: Danish 2nd Division, 4th of 12
Home colours	Away colours

Football Club Roskilde is a Danish professional association football club based in Roskilde, Region Zealand. They compete in the Danish 2nd Division, the third tier of Danish football. They play their home games at Roskilde Idrætspark (also known as 'The Eagles' Nest', after the eagle in the club's logo) which has a capacity of 6,000.

== History ==
The club was founded in 2004 as a merger between Roskilde Boldklub 1906, Svogerslev Boldklub and Himmelev-Veddelev Boldklub.

In the 2013–14 season, while playing in Division 2 (East), FC Roskilde set a new Danish league record for the number of consecutive league wins, with 20 wins in a row. The run began with a 2–0 home win against BSV on 22 September 2013 and ended with a 3–1 away win against Nordvest FC on 1 June 2014. The run was ended on 9 June 2014 by a 3–1 home defeat to Nykøbing FC.

=== Matchfixing case ===
After a 1–2 defeat to Lyngby Boldklub on 12 May 2019, Lønstrup accused his own players of match fixing. The charges from the manager came on the table at a meeting with the team, where the players demanded that Lønstrup present the evidence he said he had on the match fix. The national lottery in Denmark, Danske Spil, then went out and said, that they were investigating the charges. FC Roskilde announced later on the same day, that they had decided to suspend Lønstrup until the end of the season, in order to ensure peace of mind over the last two matches and at the same time have time to find the head and tail in the above claims.

The players allowed DIF to look in their private accounts as a part of the investigation and later also the Danish police joined the investigation. The Danish media, Politikken, wrote on 26 May 2019, that suspicious amounts have been played on matches with FC Roskilde in German kiosks. There were at least two games, that were suspicious, especially a game against Næstved BK, where large sums had been invested within a narrow geographical area in Germany. The bets were allegedly placed on the fact that there should be at least three scores in that match that ended 4–1 to Næstved. In 2014, Tipico closed for games on one of FC Vestsjælland's matches, and according to Politiken's information, the suspicious amounts of Roskilde's matches have been played from the same narrow area in Germany as then.

The owner of Roskilde then went out and said, that Lønstrup had decided to resign by himself, but Lønstrup denied that and filed Roskilde in June 2019. Lønstrup wrote in a letter to TV 2 Sport "I am sorry that my collaboration with FC Roskilde has ended in this way with a lack of support from the management, but I know that I responded as I did, and I still believe that it was the right thing to do".

== Players ==
=== Current squad ===
As of 6 September 2026

Note: Flags indicate national team as defined under FIFA eligibility rules; some limited exceptions apply. Players may hold more than one non-FIFA nationality.

No.	Pos.	Nation	Player
1	GK	DEN	Oscar Hjorth
2	DF	DEN	Mikkel Juhl Andersen
4	DF	DEN	Oliver Schkolnik
5	DF	DEN	Magnus Lysholm
6	MF	DEN	Nikolaj Zachariassen
7	FW	DEN	Emil Nielsen
9	FW	DEN	Mathias Veltz
10	MF	DEN	Mads Carlson
11	FW	DEN	Marius Uhd
12	FW	DEN	Frederik Engqvist
15	FW	DEN	Mads Freitag
16	GK	DEN	Benjamin Asare
17	MF	DEN	Silas Trier

No.	Pos.	Nation	Player
18	MF	DEN	Andreas Maarup
19	DF	DEN	Valdemar Montell
21	FW	DEN	Alexander Knaack
22	DF	USA	Conner Floyd
23	FW	DEN	Zaki Hamade
24	MF	DEN	Frederik Palle
25	MF	DEN	Marius Hammelboe
26	MF	DEN	Jonathan Mørkedal
27	DF	DEN	Frederik Howald
30	GK	DEN	Benicio Peña
31	DF	DEN	Emil Staugaard
77	FW	ISL	Bjarni Adalsteinsson

=== Youth players in use 2026–27 ===
Note: Flags indicate national team as defined under FIFA eligibility rules; some limited exceptions apply. Players may hold more than one non-FIFA nationality.

No.	Pos.	Nation	Player

=== Out on loan ===
Note: Flags indicate national team as defined under FIFA eligibility rules; some limited exceptions apply. Players may hold more than one non-FIFA nationality.

No.	Pos.	Nation	Player
