= List of Danish football transfers winter 2023–24 =

This is a list of Danish football transfers for the 2023–24 winter transfer window. Only transfers featuring Danish Superliga and * 1. Division are listed.

== Danish Superliga ==
Note: Flags indicate national team as has been defined under FIFA eligibility rules. Players may hold more than one non-FIFA nationality.

=== Copenhagen ===
In:

No.	Pos.	Nation	Player
8	MF	DEN	Magnus Mattsson (from (Netherlands) NEC)
26	DF	SCO	Scott McKenna (on loan from (England) Nottingham Forest)
31	GK	ISL	Rúnar Alex Rúnarsson (from (England) Arsenal, previously on loan at (Wales) Cardiff City)

Out:

No.	Pos.	Nation	Player
8	MF	ARG	Mateo Tanlongo (loan return to (Portugal) Sporting CP)
27	DF	DEN	Valdemar Lund (to (Norway) Molde)
41	GK	DEN	Andreas Dithmer (on loan to (Netherlands) Jong Utrecht)

=== Nordsjælland ===
In:

No.	Pos.	Nation	Player
20	MF	GHA	Araphat Mohammed (from (Ghana) Right to Dream)
32	FW	USA	Milan Iloski (from (United States) Orange County)
87	GK	NED	Robbin Ruiter (free agent)

Out:

No.	Pos.	Nation	Player
10	MF	CIV	Mohamed Diomande (on loan to (Scotland) Rangers)
30	DF	DEN	Jonas Jensen-Abbew (to AGF)
41	FW	CIV	Yannick Agnero (on loan from Helsingør)
—	DF	SWE	Ben Engdahl (on loan to Helsingør, previously on loan at (Sweden) Jönköping)
—	GK	GHA	Emmanuel Ogura (to Randers, previously on loan at HIK)
—	FW	FIN	Maksim Stjopin (to (Finland) Ilves, previously on loan at (Finland) HJK)

=== AGF ===
In:

No.	Pos.	Nation	Player
23	MF	DEN	Tobias Bach (from Fredericia)
40	DF	DEN	Jonas Jensen-Abbew (from Nordsjælland)

Out:

No.	Pos.	Nation	Player
24	MF	AUS	Zach Duncan (to (United States) Memphis 901)

=== Viborg ===
In:

No.	Pos.	Nation	Player
29	FW	GHA	Malik Abubakari (on loan from (Sweden) Malmö, previously on loan at (Slovakia) Slovan Bratislava)
55	DF	CRO	Stipe Radić (from (Bosnia and Herzegovina) Zrinjski Mostar)
58	GK	GER	Nico Mantl (on loan from (Austria) Red Bull Salzburg)

Out:

No.	Pos.	Nation	Player
12	FW	GAM	Alassana Jatta (to (England) Notts County)
—	FW	POR	Paulinho (on loan to (Portugal) Torreense, previously on loan at (Portugal) Portimonense)

=== Brøndby ===
In:

No.	Pos.	Nation	Player
11	FW	DEN	Filip Bundgaard (from Randers)
30	DF	BEL	Jordi Vanlerberghe (from (Belgium) Mechelen)

Out:

No.	Pos.	Nation	Player
11	MF	NOR	Håkon Evjen (to (Norway) Bodø/Glimt)
—	FW	DEN	Yousef Salech (to (Sweden) Sirius, previously on loan at (Belgium) Beveren)

=== Randers ===
In:

No.	Pos.	Nation	Player
18	MF	SWE	Noah Shamoun (free agent)
19	FW	DEN	Tammer Bany (from B.93)
22	GK	GHA	Emmanuel Ogura (from Nordsjælland, previously on loan at HIK)
23	FW	DEN	Muamer Brajanac (from Hobro)
29	DF	SWE	Oliver Zandén (on loan from (France) Toulouse)
77	FW	GHA	Mohammed Fuseini (on loan from (Austria) Sturm Graz)

Out:

No.	Pos.	Nation	Player
10	FW	DEN	Filip Bundgaard (to Brøndby)
19	DF	DEN	William Kaastrup (on loan to (Sweden) Västerås)
22	GK	DEN	Alexander Nybo (retired)
99	FW	SLE	Alhaji Kamara (to Midtjylland)
—	MF	DEN	Oliver Bjerrum Jensen (free agent, previously on loan at (Iceland) Afturelding)
—	FW	DEN	Tobias Klysner (to Sønderjyske, previously on loan at (Norway) Aalesund)

=== Midtjylland ===
In:

No.	Pos.	Nation	Player
45	FW	SLE	Alhaji Kamara (from Randers)

Out:

No.	Pos.	Nation	Player
25	MF	NOR	Iver Fossum (to (Belgium) Kortrijk)
44	DF	DEN	Nikolas Dyhr (to (United States) St. Louis City)
—	FW	DEN	Victor Lind (on loan to Vejle, previously on loan at (Sweden) Norrköping)
—	MF	DEN	Gustav Fraulo (to Lyngby, previously on loan at (Portugal) Mafra)

=== OB ===
In:

No.	Pos.	Nation	Player
16	GK	NOR	Viljar Myhra (from (Norway) Strømsgodset)
24	DF	GAM	Yaya Bojang (from (The Gambia) Real de Banjul)
29	DF	GAM	James Gomez (from (Czech Republic) Sparta Prague)

Out:

No.	Pos.	Nation	Player
7	FW	SLE	Mohamed Buya Turay (to (United States) Birmingham Legion)
16	DF	FIN	Sauli Väisänen (on loan to (Italy) Ascoli)
24	MF	BIH	Alen Mustafić (on loan to (Poland) Śląsk Wrocław)
29	FW	ENG	Tyler Burey (on loan to (England) Oxford United)

=== Silkeborg ===
In:

No.	Pos.	Nation	Player
19	DF	DEN	Jens Martin Gammelby (from (Norway) HamKam)
20	MF	DEN	Mads Larsen (from Esbjerg)
25	DF	SWE	Pontus Rödin (from (Sweden) Brage)
29	DF	DEN	Frederik Rieper (from Aarhus Fremad)

Out:

No.	Pos.	Nation	Player
10	FW	DEN	Søren Tengstedt (to (Netherlands) Go Ahead Eagles)
18	MF	DEN	Anders Dahl (on loan to Fredericia)
20	DF	DEN	Tobias Salquist (to (United States) Chicago Fire)
22	MF	DEN	Andreas Pyndt (on loan to (Sweden) Göteborg)
27	FW	DEN	Magnus Bøttker (free agent)

=== Lyngby ===
In:

No.	Pos.	Nation	Player
5	DF	BEL	Lucas Lissens (from (Belgium) RSCA Futures)
19	MF	DEN	Gustav Fraulo (from Midtjylland, previously on loan at (Portugal) Mafra)
29	FW	DEN	Nikolai Baden (from (Netherlands) Vitesse, previously on loan at Austria Lustenau)
33	MF	GHA	Enock Otoo (from Nordsjælland U19)
40	GK	DEN	David Jensen (from (Turkey) İstanbulspor)

Out:

No.	Pos.	Nation	Player
1	GK	DEN	Mads Kikkenborg (to (Belgium) Anderlecht)
5	DF	ESP	Marc Muniesa (to (Qatar) Al Shahaniya)
18	MF	ISL	Gylfi Sigurðsson (free agent)
19	MF	DEN	Sanders Ngabo (to (United States) Philadelphia Union)
—	DF	FRA	Baptiste Rolland (on loan to FA 2000, previously on loan at Vendsyssel)

=== Vejle ===
In:

No.	Pos.	Nation	Player
2	DF	SWE	Gustav Granath (from (Sweden) Degerfors)
18	FW	DEN	Anders Jacobsen (on loan from Horsens)
19	FW	DEN	Victor Lind (on loan from Midtjylland, previously on loan at (Sweden) Norrköping)
35	MF	AUS	Tyrese Francois (on loan from (England) Fulham)
38	DF	CRO	David Čolina (on loan from (Germany) FC Augsburg)

Out:

No.	Pos.	Nation	Player
22	DF	BIH	Vladimir Arsić (to (Ukraine) Chornomorets Odesa)
23	DF	FRO	Gilli Rólantsson (free agent)
34	MF	DEN	Lundrim Hetemi (on loan to Fredericia)
37	FW	DEN	Christian Gammelgaard (on loan to Fredericia)
60	MF	IRN	Saeid Ezatolahi (to (United Arab Emirates) Shabab Al Ahli)
77	FW	FIN	Jasin-Amin Assehnoun (on loan to (Greece) Volos)
—	MF	SWE	Kevin Čustović (to (Slovenia) Koper, previously on loan at (Republic of Ireland) Cork City)

=== Hvidovre ===
In:

No.	Pos.	Nation	Player
11	MF	DEN	Thomas Jørgensen (on loan from Copenhagen U19)

Out:

No.	Pos.	Nation	Player
3	DF	DEN	Philip Rejnhold (free agent)
11	FW	DEN	Marcus Lindberg (to (Sweden) Sirius)
12	DF	DEN	Magnus Lysholm (on loan to Fremad Amager)
17	MF	DEN	Marius Papuga (on loan to Fremad Amager)
20	DF	FRO	Elias Rusborg (on loan to (Faroe Islands) Havnar Bóltfelag)
21	FW	DEN	Morten Olsen (on loan to HIK)
28	DF	DEN	Nicolai Geertsen (retired)

== 1. Division ==
Note: Flags indicate national team as has been defined under FIFA eligibility rules. Players may hold more than one non-FIFA nationality.

=== Horsens ===
In:

No.	Pos.	Nation	Player
3	DF	USA	Manny Perez (from (United States) Louisville City)
8	MF	CIV	Odilon Kouassi (from (Ivory Coast) FC OSA)
11	FW	USA	Simon Becher (from (Canada) Vancouver Whitecaps)
14	MF	DEN	Julius Madsen (from Næstved)
15	FW	GUI	Sory Traoré (from (Guinea) Horoya)
16	FW	UGA	Rogers Mugisha (from (Kenya) Gor Mahia)
25	FW	GAM	Omar Jarju (from (The Gambia) Samger)

Out:

No.	Pos.	Nation	Player
8	MF	SWE	Albert Ejupi (free agent)
9	FW	DEN	Anders Jacobsen (on loan to Vejle)
11	FW	ISL	Aron Sigurðarson (to (Iceland) KR)
15	DF	DEN	Jacob Buus (to Sønderjyske)
16	MF	GNB	Edmilson Dos Santos (free agent)
23	DF	NGA	Gabriel Kehinde (on loan to Holstebro)
25	DF	DEN	Lukas Wagner (to Aarhus Fremad)
—	GK	DEN	Anders Hoff (on loan to Skive, previously on loan at (Faroe Islands) Tvøroyrar Bóltfelag)

=== AaB ===
In:

No.	Pos.	Nation	Player
7	FW	ENG	Jubril Adedeji (from Køge)
18	MF	SWE	Daniel Ask (from (Sweden) Västerås)
24	DF	SWE	André Álvarez Pérez (on loan from (Sweden) Malmö, previously on loan at (Sweden) Olympic)
30	FW	DEN	Mathias Jørgensen (from Esbjerg)

Out:

No.	Pos.	Nation	Player
2	DF	DEN	Kristoffer Pallesen (retired)
6	MF	POR	Pedro Ferreira (to (Portugal) Santa Clara)
10	MF	DEN	Lucas Andersen (to (England) Queens Park Rangers)
11	FW	SWE	Tim Prica (to (Sweden) Norrköping)
24	DF	NOR	Jonas Skulstad (to (Norway) Lyn)
28	MF	DEN	Jeppe Pedersen (on loan to Kolding)

=== Sønderjyske ===
In:

No.	Pos.	Nation	Player
13	DF	NZL	Dalton Wilkins (from Kolding)
31	DF	DEN	Jacob Buus (from Horsens)
32	FW	DEN	Tobias Klysner (from Randers, previously on loan at (Norway) Aalesund)

Out:

No.	Pos.	Nation	Player
9	FW	DEN	Mikkel Hyllegaard (on loan to Middelfart)
23	MF	DEN	Mads Hansen (on loan to Middelfart)
29	MF	DEN	Kristoffer Jørgensen (to (Czech Republic) Zbrojovka Brno)

=== Vendsyssel ===
In:

No.	Pos.	Nation	Player
6	MF	DEN	Frederik Børsting (from (Norway) Brann)
22	MF	DEN	Rasmus Thellufsen (from (United States) Louisville City)
44	DF	SWE	Tim Hartzell (from (Sweden) Dalkurd)

Out:

No.	Pos.	Nation	Player
3	MF	DEN	Mattias Jakobsen (to Køge)
6	DF	FRA	Baptiste Rolland (loan return to Lyngby)
15	MF	DEN	Mads Christiansen (on loan to (Faroe Islands) 07 Vestur)
19	FW	DEN	Zean Dalügge (on loan to (Faroe Islands) B36 Tórshavn)
23	FW	ENG	Benni Smales-Braithwaite (on loan to (Faroe Islands) 07 Vestur)
37	MF	USA	Caden Clark (loan return to (Germany) RB Leipzig)

=== Næstved ===
In:

No.	Pos.	Nation	Player
3	DF	SUI	Baba Souare (from (Switzerland) Servette)
10	MF	RSA	Keanin Ayer (from (Norway) Sandefjord)
16	DF	SWE	Emil Hellman (from (Sweden) Helsingborg)
17	FW	CMR	Junior Kameni (on loan from (Morocco) FUS Rabat)
18	GK	DEN	Jeppe Rømer (from Slagelse B&I)
26	MF	SWE	Nahom Netabay (free agent)
30	GK	DEN	Alexander Kostow (from Thisted)

Out:

No.	Pos.	Nation	Player
10	MF	DEN	Souheib Dhaflaoui (to Helsingør)
14	MF	DEN	Julius Madsen (to Horsens)
17	FW	DEN	Abdoulie Njai (to Kolding)
26	GK	DEN	Filip Mellbin (to AB)
27	GK	IRQ	Mohammad Hassan (to Ishøj)

=== Helsingør ===
In:

No.	Pos.	Nation	Player
1	GK	DEN	Kasper Kristensen (from (Sweden) Trelleborg)
5	DF	SWE	Lucas Larsen (from (Sweden) Eskilsminne)
7	MF	SWE	Erik Andersson (from (Sweden) Sundsvall)
8	MF	FIN	Saku Ylätupa (on loan from (Sweden) Kalmar)
9	FW	CIV	Yannick Agnero (on loan from Nordsjælland)
18	MF	SWE	Ludvig Carlius (from (Sweden) Mjällby, previously on loan at (Sweden) Ängelholm)
24	DF	SWE	Ben Engdahl (on loan from Nordsjælland, previously on loan at (Sweden) Jönköping)
68	MF	DEN	Souheib Dhaflaoui (from Næstved)

Out:

No.	Pos.	Nation	Player
1	GK	DEN	Frederik Ibsen (free agent)
9	FW	DEN	Oliver Drost (to (India) Bengaluru)
12	DF	GIB	Jayce Olivero (to (Gibraltar) St Joseph's)
17	FW	DEN	Frederik Christensen (to Hobro)
18	MF	DEN	Hektor Thomsen (loan return to Nordsjælland)
21	MF	DEN	Robert Marcus (on loan to (Faroe Islands) EB/Streymur)
24	FW	DEN	Mathias Bill (to Fremad Amager)
29	MF	DEN	Emil Wass (free agent)
45	FW	DEN	Jakob Johansson (to (Faroe Islands) Havnar Bóltfelag)

=== Fredericia ===
In:

No.	Pos.	Nation	Player
1	GK	FRO	Mattias Lamhauge (from (Faroe Islands) B36 Tórshavn)
17	FW	DEN	Christian Gammelgaard (on loan from Vejle)
14	MF	DEN	Anders Dahl (on loan from Silkeborg)
24	MF	DEN	Lundrim Hetemi (on loan from Vejle)

Out:

No.	Pos.	Nation	Player
1	GK	DEN	Valdemar Birksø (loan return to Midtjylland)
6	DF	DEN	Jeppe Gertsen (to (Iceland) Vestri)
10	MF	DEN	Nicklas Røjkjær (to (Sweden) Mjällby)
11	FW	DEN	Adam Jakobsen (to (Sweden) Brommapojkarna)
14	MF	DEN	Frederik Ørsøe Christensen (to (Sweden) Brommapojkarna)
16	MF	DEN	Tobias Bach (to AGF)
51	GK	DEN	Jeppe Højbjerg (free agent)

=== Køge ===
In:

No.	Pos.	Nation	Player
3	DF	NED	Gabriël Çulhacı (from (Netherlands) Helmond Sport)
4	DF	DEN	Hans Christian Bonnesen (from Fremad Amager)
22	MF	DEN	Mattias Jakobsen (from Vendsyssel)
26	FW	CUW	Jafar Arias (free agent)
29	GK	KAZ	Dulat Talyspayev (from (Kazakhstan) Atyrau)

Out:

No.	Pos.	Nation	Player
1	GK	DEN	Sebastian John (to (Faroe Islands) 07 Vestur)
3	DF	DEN	Frederik Bay (free agent)
4	DF	MNE	Nemanja Cavnić (to (Bosnia and Herzegovina) Željezničar)
14	FW	ENG	Jubril Adedeji (to AaB)
20	FW	DEN	Tobias Pedersen (free agent)
—	FW	NGA	Effiong Nsungusi (to (Uzbekistan) Neftchi Fergana, previously on loan at (Kazakhstan) Atyrau)

=== Hillerød ===
In:

No.	Pos.	Nation	Player
14	MF	DEN	Solomon Opoku (from (Finland) Honka II)
17	FW	FRO	Adrian Justinussen (from (Faroe Islands) Havnar Bóltfelag)
90	FW	DEN	Marco Bruhn (from (Italy) Lecce Primavera)

Out:

No.	Pos.	Nation	Player
11	FW	DEN	Ahmed Hassan (to AB)
13	MF	DEN	Matin Al-Atlassi (to Fremad Amager)
23	FW	DEN	Asger Højmark (to Nykøbing)
28	DF	DEN	Mads-Emil Langberg (to Fremad Amager)

=== Hobro ===
In:

No.	Pos.	Nation	Player
1	GK	DEN	Andreas Søndergaard (from Vestri)
9	FW	DEN	Frederik Christensen (from Helsingør)
14	FW	DEN	Jesper Cornelius (from Vorup FB)
19	FW	GHA	Richmond Gyamfi (free agent)
25	GK	DEN	Christopher Bobber Møller (free agent)

Out:

No.	Pos.	Nation	Player
1	GK	DEN	Jonathan Fischer (to (Norway) Fredrikstad)
4	DF	DEN	Jacob Tjørnelund (free agent)
9	FW	DEN	Laurs Skjellerup (to (Sweden) Göteborg)
10	FW	DEN	Muamer Brajanac (to Randers)
73	GK	DEN	William Tønning (to (New Zealand) Napier City Rovers)

=== Kolding ===
In:

No.	Pos.	Nation	Player
5	DF	ISL	Ari Leifsson (from (Norway) Strømsgodset)
11	FW	DEN	Abdoulie Njai (from Næstved)
17	MF	DEN	Jeppe Pedersen (on loan from AaB)
18	MF	DEN	Villads Westh (from Randers U19)
20	DF	ISL	Davíð Ingvarsson (from (Iceland) Breiðablik)
99	GK	GER	Lennart Moser (free agent)

Out:

No.	Pos.	Nation	Player
5	DF	NZL	Dalton Wilkins (to Sønderjyske)
10	MF	DEN	Christian Kudsk (to Skive)
24	DF	DEN	Simon Trier (to Middelfart)
33	GK	DEN	Jesper Sørensen (to AB)
34	MF	DEN	Sebastian Denius (to Aarhus Fremad)

=== B.93 ===
In:

No.	Pos.	Nation	Player
11	FW	DEN	Emeka Nnamani (from Nykøbing)

Out:

No.	Pos.	Nation	Player
11	MF	BOL	Antonio Bustamante (to (Bolivia) Aurora)
14	FW	DEN	Tammer Bany (to Randers)
15	DF	DEN	Søren Sørensen (to Brønshøj)
25	GK	DEN	Marcus Alstrup (to (United States) Austin II)
30	FW	NGA	Emmanuel Ogude (free agent)

== See also ==
- 2023–24 Danish Superliga
- 2023–24 Danish 1st Division
