= Daniel Thøgersen =

Danish footballer (born 2000)

Personal information
- Full name: Daniel Lønborg Thøgersen
- Date of birth: 8 January 2000 (age 26)
- Place of birth: Brabrand, Denmark
- Height: 1.83 m (6 ft 0 in)
- Position: Left-back

Team information
- Current team: Skive
- Number: 2

Youth career
- Brabrand
- 2012–2017: AGF

Senior career*
Years	Team	Apps	(Gls)
2017–2020	AGF	4	(0)
2019	→ Næstved (loan)	10	(0)
2020	→ Kolding (loan)	14	(1)
2020–2021	Kolding	22	(0)
2021–2022	HB Køge	24	(1)
2022–2023	Esbjerg fB	15	(0)
2023–2024	B.93	30	(0)
2024–2026	Fredericia	16	(0)
2026	→ Skive (loan)	15	(2)
2026–	Skive	9	(0)

International career
2016–2017	Denmark U17	9	(0)
2017–2018	Denmark U18	5	(0)
2018	Denmark U19	3	(0)
- * Club domestic league appearances and goals as of 21:00, 3 October 2026 (UTC)

Daniel Lønborg Thøgersen (born 8 January 2000) is a Danish footballer who plays for Skive IK.

== Career ==
=== Club career ===
Thøgersen started his career at the age of 7 at Brabrand IF, where his father was the coach. At the age of 12, in 2012, Thøgersen joined AGF. He developed well and was one of the stars of the youth sector, which was rewarded with a youth contract in November 2015.

In the summer 2017, Thøgersen was permanently promoted into the first team squad and also signed a new three-year professional contract. He got his official debut for the club on 29 August 2017 against VSK Aarhus in the Danish Cup, where he played the whole game.

On 2 September 2019, the last day of the summer transfer market, Thøgersen was loaned out to Danish 1st Division club Næstved BK for the rest of 2019 to gain some first team minutes, after having only played six games for AGF. On 9 December 2019 it was confirmed, that Thøgersen had been loaned out again, this time to Kolding IF for the rest of the season. In July 2020, Thøgersen was signed permanently by Kolding.

On 15 June 2021, Thøgersen signed a 2,5-year contract with Danish 1st Division club HB Køge. After a year at Køge, Thøgersen left the club to join newly relegated Danish 2nd Division club Esbjerg fB, signing a deal for the rest of the year on 26 August 2022. On 30 June 2023, Thøgersen signed with newly promoted 1st Division club B.93.

On May 15, 2024, the Danish 1st Division club FC Fredericia confirmed that they had signed Thøgersen on a contract until June 2026. On 3 February 2026, Thøgersen was loaned from FC Fredericia to Danish 2nd Division side Skive IK for the remainder of the season.

After the loan deal, he signed a permanent two-year contract with Skive IK.

== Career statistics ==
As of match played 28 April 2019

Club	Season	League			Danish Cup		Total	
Club	Season	Division	Apps	Goals	Apps	Goals	Apps	Goals
AGF	2017–18	Danish Superliga	0	0	1	0	1	0
AGF	2018–19	Danish Superliga	4	0	1	0	5	0
AGF	Total		4	0	2	0	6	0
Career total			4	0	2	0	6	0
