= Mads Hansen =

Mads Hansen may refer to:

- Mads Hansen (ice hockey) (born 1978), Norwegian ice hockey player
- Mads Hansen (footballer, born 1984), Norwegian footballer
- Mads Hansen (footballer, born 2001), Danish footballer
- Mads Hansen (footballer, born 2002), Danish footballer
- Mads Hansen (speedway rider) (born 2000), Danish speedway rider
