= 1979 Danish 1st Division =

34th season of Danish 1st Division

Danish 1st Division
- Season: 1979

The 1979 Danish 1st Division season was the 34th season of the Danish 1st Division league championship, governed by the Danish Football Association. It constituted the 66th edition of the Danish football championship, and saw Esbjerg fB win the championship title.

The Danish champions qualified for the European Cup 1980-81, while the second placed teams qualified for the UEFA Cup 1980-81. The three lowest placed teams of the tournament were directly relegated to the Danish 2nd Division for the following season. Likewise, the Danish 2nd Division champions and two first runners-up were promoted to the 1st Division.

== Table ==
Pos	Team	Pld	W	D	L	GF	GA	GD	Pts
1	Esbjerg fB	30	18	10	2	59	30	+29	46
2	KB	30	16	8	6	58	34	+24	40
3	B 1903	30	15	8	7	53	31	+22	38
4	Kastrup BK	30	13	11	6	45	30	+15	37
5	Odense BK	30	15	7	8	53	40	+13	37
6	Næstved IF	30	15	6	9	59	45	+14	36
7	BK Frem	30	10	10	10	29	32	−3	30
8	Vejle BK	30	12	5	13	45	44	+1	29
9	Aarhus GF	30	9	10	11	47	44	+3	28
10	Ikast FS	30	10	7	13	48	59	−11	27
11	Hvidovre IF	30	9	9	12	43	57	−14	27
12	Aalborg BK	30	10	6	14	42	45	−3	26
13	B 93	30	8	8	14	30	45	−15	24
14	B 1901	30	5	10	15	45	59	−14	20
15	IK Skovbakken	30	4	11	15	30	61	−31	19
16	Slagelse B&I	30	5	6	19	34	64	−30	16

== Results ==
Home \ Away	AaB	AGF	B93	B01	B03	EfB	BKF	HIF	IFS	KAS	KBK	NIF	OB	SKV	SBI	VBK
Aalborg BK	—	1–1	1–3	2–1	1–1	0–0	4–1	3–2	3–1	1–2	0–1	1–2	1–2	2–1	3–2	1–2
Aarhus GF	2–3	—	4–1	1–1	0–1	2–2	1–2	0–0	4–1	1–2	2–1	1–2	4–2	1–0	1–1	2–3
B.93	1–0	0–3	—	3–0	1–0	1–1	1–2	2–4	3–3	1–3	0–0	0–2	0–2	1–1	3–1	2–1
B 1901	1–1	3–0	0–1	—	2–3	0–0	1–2	2–3	4–3	2–2	2–3	1–2	2–2	2–2	3–0	2–1
B 1903	1–0	2–2	0–0	2–1	—	2–4	0–0	3–1	2–0	3–1	0–1	1–1	1–2	7–1	6–1	1–2
Esbjerg fB	3–0	1–1	0–3	4–1	2–0	—	3–1	4–2	4–0	3–1	1–0	2–1	3–1	2–2	1–1	1–0
BK Frem	1–2	2–1	0–0	2–1	1–1	2–0	—	3–1	2–0	0–0	0–1	0–2	0–1	0–0	2–1	1–2
Hvidovre IF	1–0	0–3	0–0	0–0	1–1	0–0	2–1	—	3–3	1–3	2–1	3–1	1–3	1–1	1–0	2–0
Ikast FS	0–0	3–2	2–0	5–1	0–1	0–1	2–1	1–0	—	0–1	2–1	3–2	1–1	4–1	2–0	0–3
Kastrup BK	1–1	0–0	2–0	3–1	1–2	1–2	1–1	3–0	0–0	—	1–1	0–2	2–1	4–0	0–0	1–1
Kjøbenhavns BK	4–3	4–1	1–0	0–0	2–2	2–3	0–0	2–0	8–1	1–1	—	3–2	2–2	3–1	1–0	1–0
Næstved IF	2–1	0–2	4–1	3–2	0–1	0–3	4–1	4–4	2–2	3–1	2–2	—	3–0	0–0	4–2	2–4
Odense BK	0–2	3–1	4–1	1–1	2–1	4–4	0–1	5–0	3–1	1–1	1–3	1–1	—	0–2	1–0	1–0
IK Skovbakken	3–1	1–1	1–1	2–4	0–2	0–0	0–0	2–5	1–5	0–1	1–3	0–2	1–2	—	2–0	2–6
Slagelse B&I	1–4	1–1	2–0	4–2	1–3	1–3	0–0	1–1	3–1	1–2	2–5	3–2	0–4	1–2	—	4–0
Vejle BK	2–0	1–2	1–0	2–2	0–3	1–2	0–0	5–2	2–2	0–4	2–1	0–2	0–1	0–0	4–0	—

Legend: Blue = home team win; Yellow = draw; Red = away team win.

== Top goalscorers ==
Position	Player	Club	Goals
1	John Eriksen	Odense BK	20
