= VSK Aarhus =

Danish football club in Risskov

- Full name: Vejlby Skovbakken Aarhus
- Founded: 1 July 2016; 10 years ago
- Ground: Vejlby Stadium
- Capacity: 5,000
- Chairman: Martin Christensen
- Manager: Jacob Eichner
- League: Danish 2nd Division
- 2025–26: Danish 2nd Division, 8th of 12
- Website: http://www.vskaarhus.dk/
Home colours

Vejlby Skovbakken Aarhus (Danish pronunciation: [ˈvɑjlpyˌskɒwpɑkŋ̍ ˈɒːˌhuˀs]; commonly known as VSK Aarhus) is a Danish football club based in Risskov, a neighbourhood in Aarhus. The club was founded in 2016 when the football departments of Vejlby IK Fodbold and Idrætsklubben Skovbakken decided to merge. Skovbakken is a major multi-sport club who besides football also compete in basketball, handball, badminton, tennis, and volleyball, with many honours won in these departments.

The men's team of VSK competes in the Danish 2nd Division, the third tier of the Danish football league system. The women's team dissolved in 2020 and merged with IF Lyseng and Aarhus Gymnastikforening to form AGF. The team plays in the A-Liga, the women's top flight. The home ground is Vejlby Stadium which has a capacity of 5,000.

== History ==
=== Separate clubs, common ground ===
VSK Aarhus was formed through a merger of Vejlby IK Fodbold (VIK) and the men's football department of IK Skovbakken on 1 July 2016. Both clubs shared their home grounds at Vejlby Stadium and had each their own clubhouse part of Vejlby-Risskov Idrætscenter.

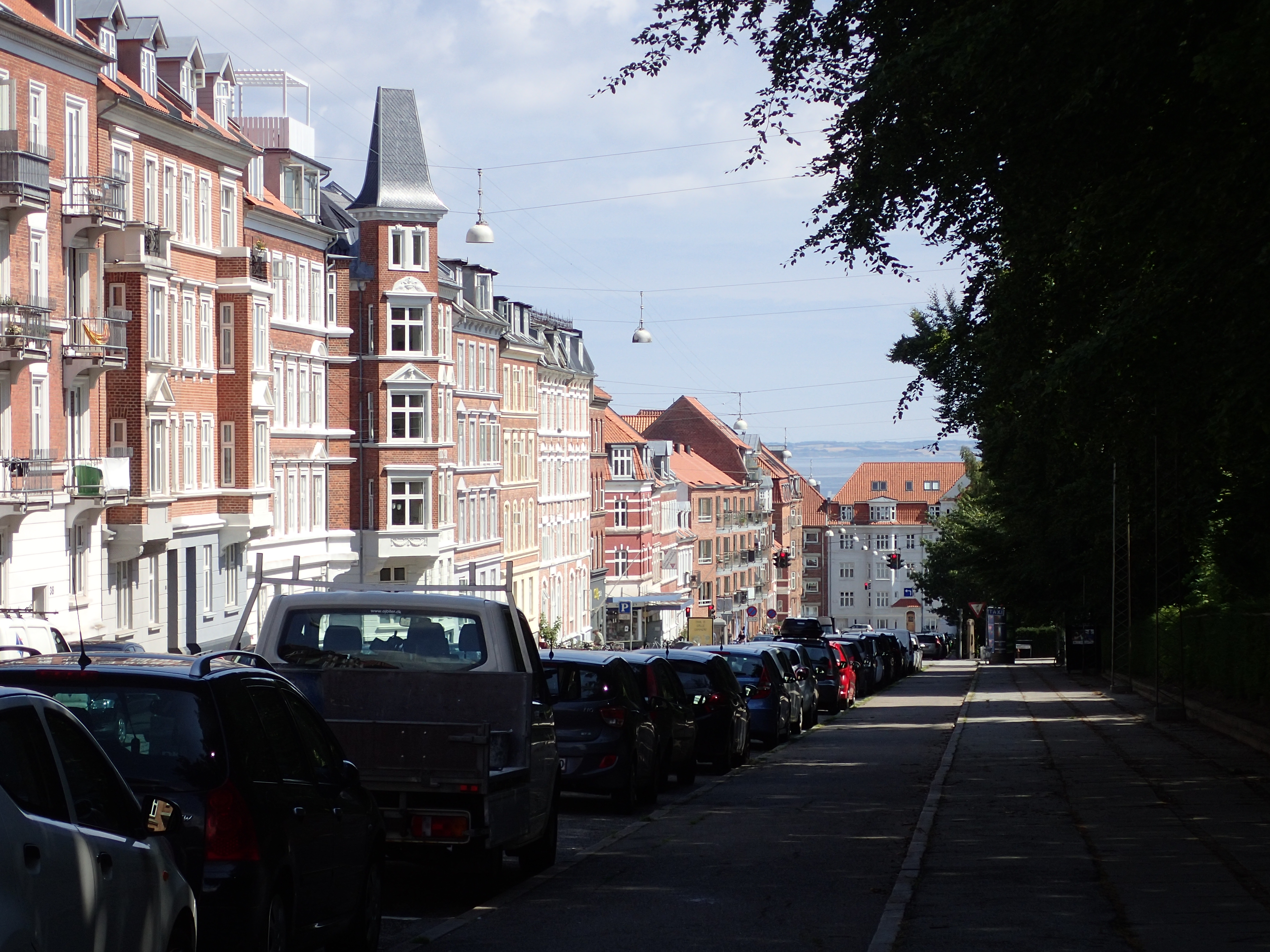
The neighbourhood of Trøjborg, where IK Skovbakken - parent club of VSK Aarhus - was founded in 1927.

Vejlby IK was founded in 1949 as a football club in the Aarhus suburb of Vejlby, while Skovbakken was established in the neighbourhood of Trøjborg in 1927. Skovbakken was named after section 1 of the Arbejdernes Andels Boligforening (AAB), a housing area by Marienlund. AAB, founded in 1919, is the oldest organisation for subsidised housing in Aarhus, and the club therefore has strong working class roots. Skovbakken's first ground was at Ferdinands Plads in Riis Skov. In 1939, the club moved to Riisvangen, where facilities were largely built through volunteering. In 1969, the club moved to the newly established Vejlby-Risskov Idrætscenter on the initiative of a number of visionary leaders in IK Skovbakken, and had their home ground at the stadium facility, Vejlby Stadium. Here, the football department of Skovbakken would soon find success, and they spent the 1978 season and 1979 season at the highest level. Symbolically, the subsequent decline of Skovbakken occurred with the advent of professionalism in Danish football, which was introduced on 25 February 1978 by the Danish Football Union.

Skovbakken and Vejlby IK shared the ground at Vejlby Stadium and throughout the following decades, the two clubs formed a rivalry, but also had multiple attempts of merging. The first initiative was taken by chairman of Vejlby IK Gymnastik, Erik Brandtoft in the 1987, but these plans did initially not come to fruition. A new initiative surfaced in the 1990s, when Ove Poulsen who was associated with both clubs, took control of negotiations for a merger. However, the proposal failed to gain approval at the general assembly of Vejlby IK.

=== The first merger (1999–2000) ===
In 1999, IK Skovbakken entered into an agreement to merge with Aarhus Fremad, whose first team competed in the Danish Superliga, the highest level of Danish football. This superstructure, named FC Aarhus, was formed with the goal of becoming one of the top clubs of Denmark. However, the merger only survived for six months, as the new club had already built up a deficit of DKK 2.5 million. Skovbakken dropped out of the merger while the Aarhus Fremad board decided to continue their professional department under the name of FC Aarhus for the next four years with the continued ambition of reaching the Superliga, after suffering relegation from the highest level in 1999. After Skovbakken withdrew from the merger, the first team was placed in the lower divisions of Danish football, and only stopped the decline at Series 1, the sixth highest level.

=== Forming VSK Aarhus (2008–2016) ===
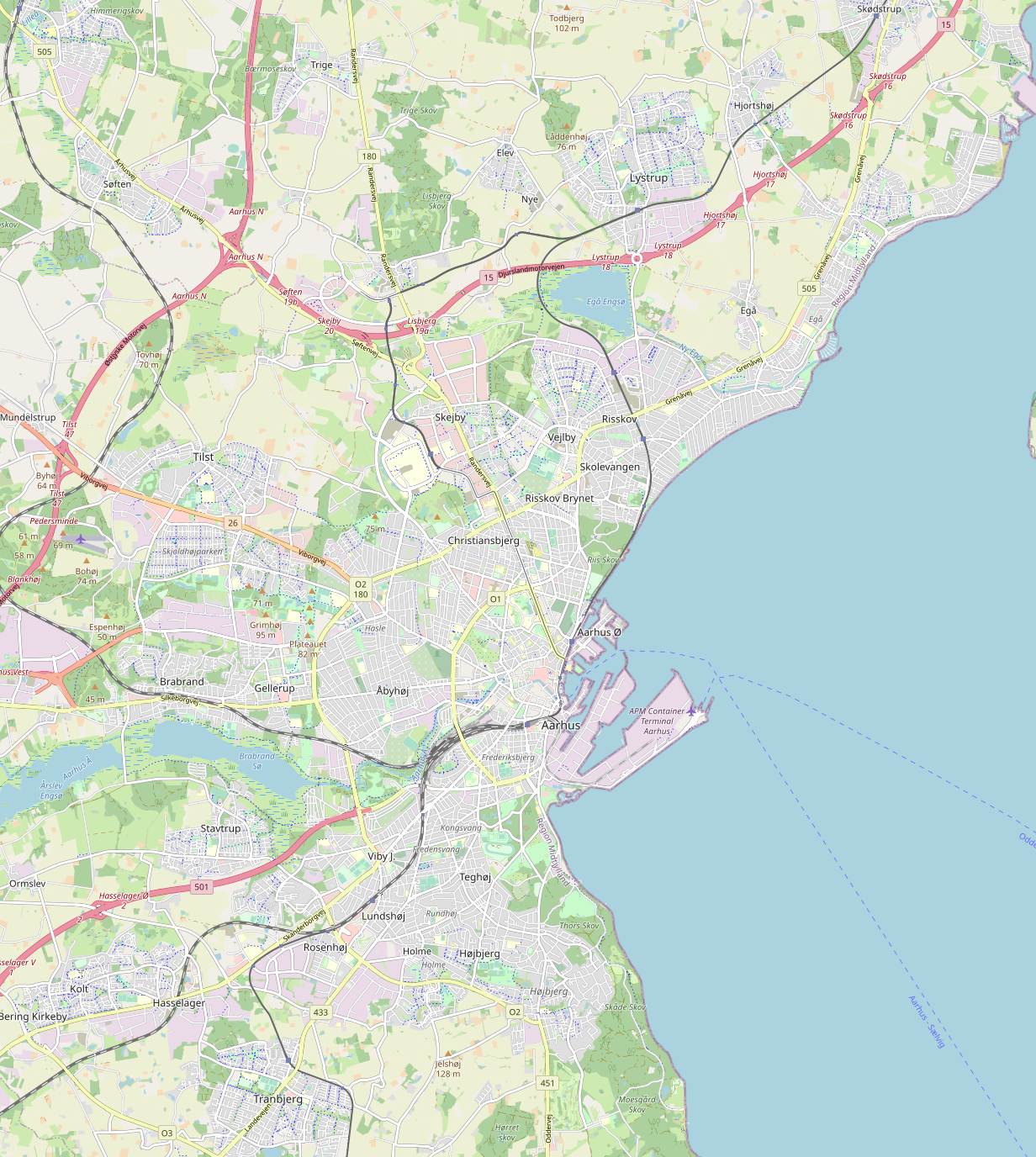
The location of the two founding parent clubs for the superstructure club VSK Aarhus in Aarhus (in red). The overview also shows the location of Aarhus Fremad (amateur section) which participated in the inaugural meetings in 2015 (in cyan).

In 2008, the Danish Football Union introduced a licensing system in the youth departments of Danish clubs. Initially developed by the UEFA in 2004, club licensing sets a standard of good practice both on the field and in administration. Skovbakken did not receive a license for its youth teams, which meant that its best youth talents left the club for other clubs in the region. As a consequence of this, the under-16 team, who had just promoted to the highest division for that age group after reaching first place in the second highest division, was suddenly disbanded. The club had the reshuffle its youth teams in the following years, and sought to implement a new structure for the youth department. However, there were not enough youth players available to form a competitive academy due to an exodus of youth players. This was not only the case for Skovbakken, but also for local rivals Vejlby IK Fodbold and Aarhus Fremad, where youth players frequently began moving between the three clubs' youth departments. Therefore, in the summer of 2010, Skovbakken, Vejlby IK and Aarhus Fremad entered into a cooperation agreement to provide both superstructure teams and joint teams at U13, U14, U15 and U16-levels under the name of the former superstructure, FC Aarhus.

At an internal evaluation seminar between the three clubs in January 2015, it was agreed that youth football in the area would thrive the best in the case of a merger in footballing departments. The three clubs' boards set up a collaboration committee for the merger in March 2015. Martin Østergaard, Ane Mathilde Pedersen and John Duus Andresen (Vejlby IK), Jesper Simonsen and Poul Mortensen (Skovbakken women's football) and Thomas Pallesen and Leif Gjørtz Christensen (Skovbakken men's football) all participated in the merger working group. The amateur department of Aarhus Fremad would initially participate in the meetings, but withdrew from the project on 30 May 2015 as they became part of Aarhus Fremad Fodbold ApS, who ran their first team and reserve teams.

The merger was agreed upon after two successive general assemblies in Vejlby IK and Skovbakken, respectively, in February 2016. Subsequently, the new club was formed at the next founding general assembly, with the official date of inception being 1 July 2016. The first chairman was Leif Gjørtz Christensen from Skovbakken. Initially, it was decided by large majority of votes from both clubs that the new football superstructure should be named FC Vejlby, but after some months later an extraordinary general meeting was requested by a large number of members, who, in June 2016, decided to change the name to Vejlby Skovbakken Aarhus – or VSK Aarhus.

=== Finding foothold in the third tier (2016–present) ===
Building upon the license of IK Skovbakken, VSK Aarhus would in their debut season compete in the 2016–17 Danish 2nd Divisions (third highest division). They were placed in Group 3, which counted eight teams from Jutland, of which three, including VSK, were from the greater Aarhus area. Poul Lyse and Michele Demontis, who had worked as assistants under former head coaches Jakob Michelsen and Ole Brandenborg, had taken over as head coaching team in 2011, and would continue in this position for VSK in the new season. Lyse and Demontis had formerly been awarded 2014 Coaches of the Year in the Danish 2nd Division, and had achieved good results for Skovbakken during their tenure in view of the club's non-professional status. During the summer of 2016, the first team had lost eight players to other clubs, and would rely heavily on promoted youth team players for the season. The first official game in competition for VSK was a Danish 2nd Division away match against Brabrand IF on 5 August 2016 at Brabrand Stadion in front of 248 spectatators; a match which ended in a 3–0 loss to VSK. Four days later, on 9 August, the club faced local rivals Aarhus Fremad in the Danish Cup away at Riisvangen Stadion, where VSK parent club IK Skovbakken had its home ground between 1939 and 1969. In front of 321 spectators, midfielder Oscar Scott Carl scored VSK's first goal in competition in the 61st minute to tie the game 1–1 after Mathias Valentin had scored the opening goal for Aarhus Fremad. The teams stayed level at 1–1 and the match went to a penalty shoot-out, which VSK won 5–4 to advance to the second round. On the following matchday in the league, on 13 August at home at Vejlby Stadium against Jammerbugt FC, Anders Kjeldgaard scored the first league goal for VSK to secure a 1–1 draw. At the halfway mark of the season, VSK had finished sixth out of the eight teams with 11 points after 14 matches, and would thus compete the spring season in the relegation group. The club managed to haul in 33 points in 22 matches during the spring, finishing in fifth place of the table, eight points clear of the relegation zone. In the cup, VSK had beat Kolding IF 4–3 at home on 30 August 2016 after knocking out Aarhus Fremad. In the third round, the club faced Danish Superliga club AaB home at Vejlby Stadium on 26 October. Despite a strong showing by the home team, the match ended in a 0–1 loss which ended VSK's first cup run.

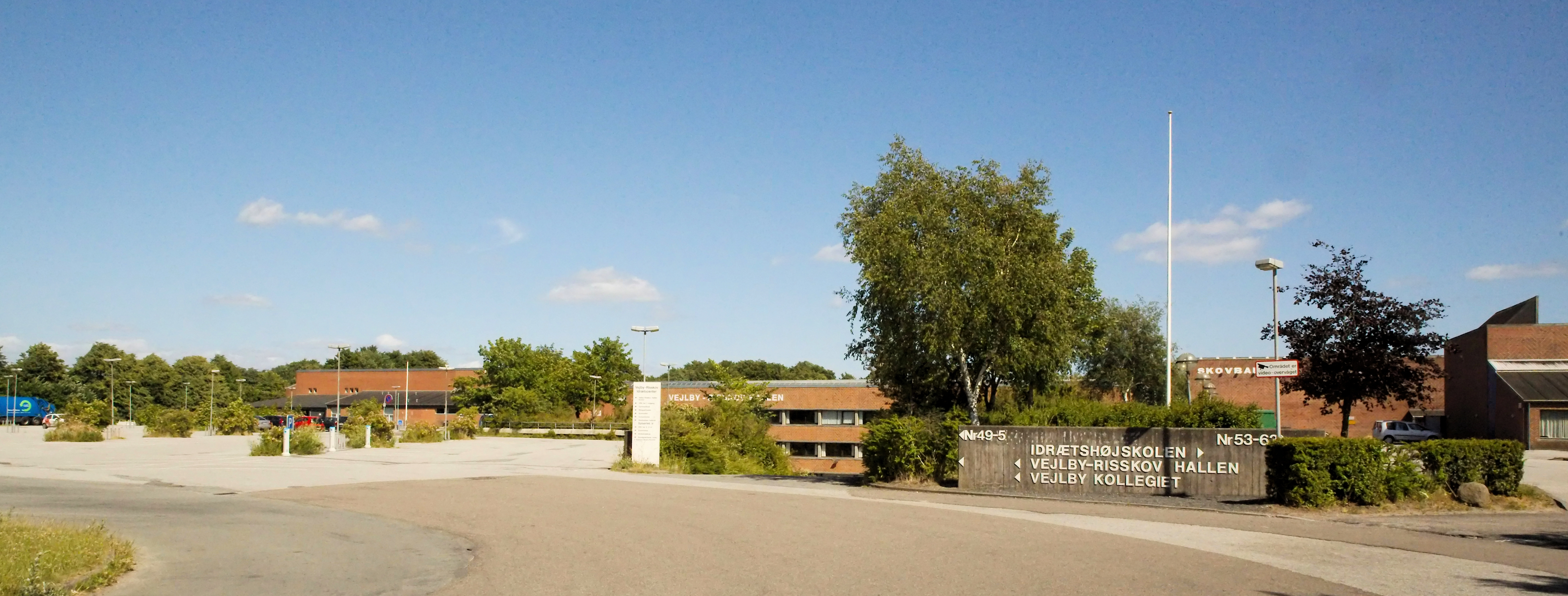
Entrance to the Vejlby-Risskov sports complex, which holds Vejlby Stadium, the home ground of VSK Aarhus.

Prior to the 2017–18 season, head coaches Lyse and Demontis signed two-year contract extensions. The latter stated that he saw a realistic chance of the team playing for promotion during its second season. The first team squad had almost been kept intact throughout the summer transfer window, and had been strengthened by the acquisition of forward Shawn Rathcke Memory who had been signed from lower-tier club FC Skanderborg. Once again placed in Group 3, their season kicked off on 5 August 2017 with a 1–1 away draw against FC Sydvest 05. Results worsened during the fall season and as a result of the disappointing start to the season, Lyse and Demontis were sacked as head coaches on 8 November 2017. Demontis would instead continue in the role as director of football as well as assistant coach for the first team. The head coaching change occurred after VSK had finished sixth in the table – seven points from the promotion group – and would therefore once again compete in the relegation group in the spring. In the cup, VSK had knocked out Linde Boldklub in the first round away at Langhøjskolen with a 12–0 win. In the second round, they faced local Danish Superliga team AGF on 29 August, a game that was televised, which VSK lost 1–4. During the winter transfer window, the club lost several of their key players: team captain Henrik Brodersen left for Kolding IF, while forward Frederik Høgh and left back Jacob Torp moved to local rivals Aarhus Fremad. Demontis later criticised Torp and Høgh for their move, calling it "incomprehensible", as Fremad played at the same level, also competing in the relegation group. On 25 January 2018, the club signed Jesper Højlund as their new head coach, who had coached the Aarhus Fremad reserves until then. A tumultuous spring season, which included big home losses to Næsby Boldklub (2–5) and B.93 (0–3) and only six wins to 12 losses in total, saw VSK Aarhus suffer relegation. This was effectuated on 2 June 2018, when Brønshøj Boldklub beat Aarhus Fremad 3–2, which meant that VSK could no longer avoid relegation to the Denmark Series, the fourth tier of Danish football.

After the end of the season, director of football and former head coach, Michele Demontis, stated that VSK had to promote directly back to the Danish 2nd Division (third tier).

== Stadium ==
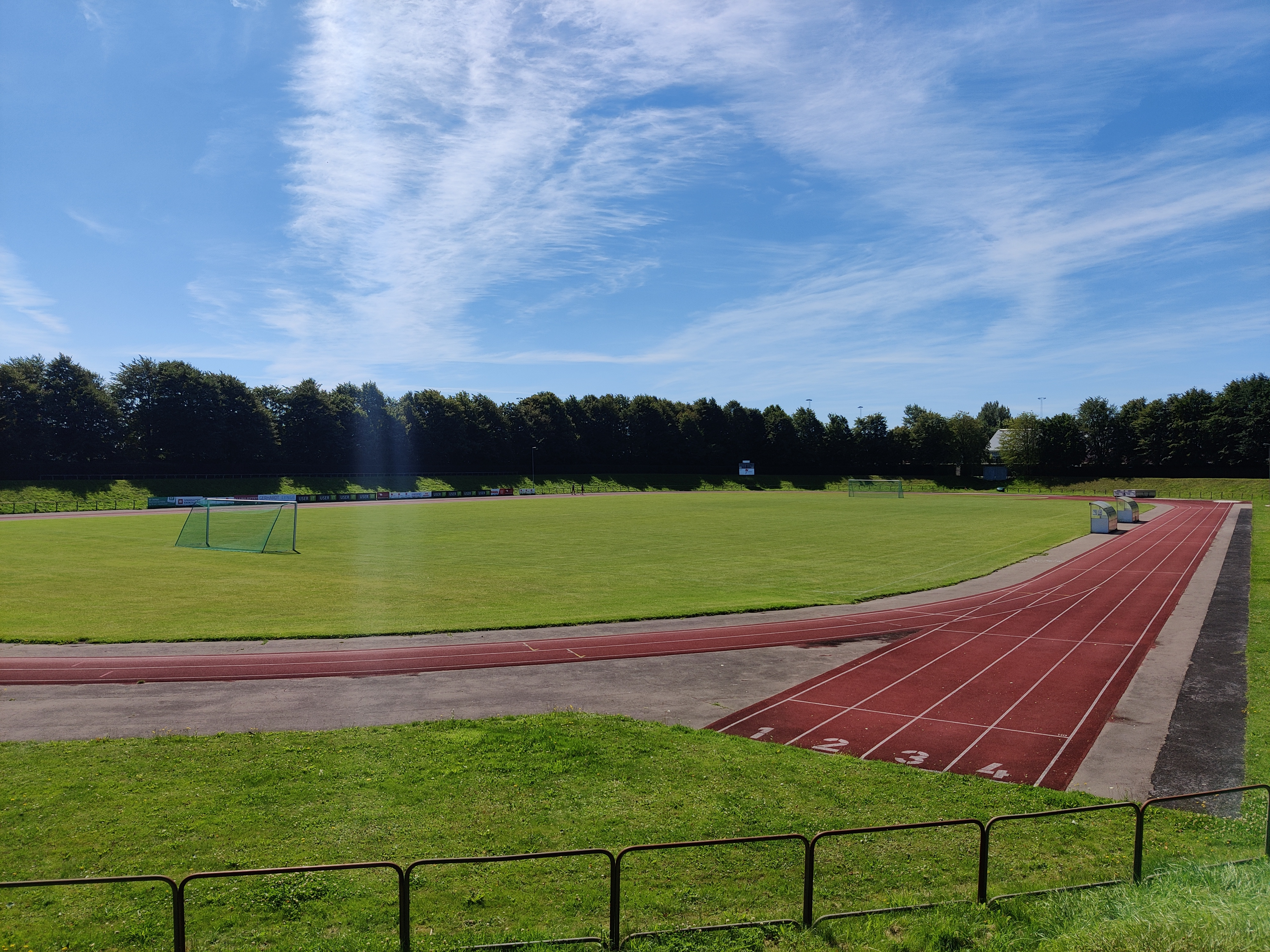
Vejlby Stadium in 2020.

VSK Aarhus have only had one home ground, Vejlby Stadium, where they have played since the team's foundation in 2016. The stadium is part of a larger sports complex, Vejlby-Risskov Idrætscenter, which was inaugurated in 1969, and is situated in the district of Risskov in Aarhus. Besides the stadium itself, which can hold a total of 5,000 spectators of which 300 are seated, the complex features 10 grass pitches, an artificial turf pitch, a folk high school of sports (Idrætshøjskolen Århus), four indoor sports halls, including the sports and events arena of Vejlby-Risskov Hallen, a swimming hall and administrative offices.

Record attendance at Vejlby Stadium occurred on 7 September 1978, when IK Skovbakken faced local rivals AGF in the Danish Superliga, then called 1st Division. 11,763 spectators saw the home team lose 2–4.

== Current squad ==
As of 5 September 2026

Note: Flags indicate national team as defined under FIFA eligibility rules; some limited exceptions apply. Players may hold more than one non-FIFA nationality.

No.	Pos.	Nation	Player
1	GK	DEN	Kasper Green-Pedersen
2	DF	DEN	Daniel Jakobsen
3	FW	DEN	Tinus Olesen
4	DF	DEN	Nicklas Mehl
5	DF	DEN	Sebastian Schøt
6	DF	DEN	Søren Pedersen
7	MF	DEN	Mikkel Rytter
8	MF	DEN	Nikolaj Sauer
9	MF	DEN	Noah Have
10	FW	DEN	Sebastian Buch
11	FW	DEN	Frederik Sloth
12	MF	DEN	Oscar Jacobsen
14	MF	DEN	Mads Lauenstein
16	FW	DEN	Peter Nemec

No.	Pos.	Nation	Player
17	FW	DEN	Jonas Yderholm
18	DF	DEN	Oliver Østergaard
19	DF	DEN	Theis Eskildsen
20	MF	DEN	Mads Hansen
21	DF	DEN	Simon Søndergaard
23	DF	DEN	Emil Dissing
24	MF	DEN	Kasper Jørgensen
25	DF	DEN	Andreas Knak
26	GK	DEN	Kasper Holm Rod
27	DF	DEN	Simon Trier
28	MF	DEN	Max Albæk (on loan from Randers)
29	MF	DEN	Toby Pedersen
30	GK	DEN	Casper Andersen

== Backroom staff ==
=== Club officials ===
Position	Staff
Chairman	Leif Gjørtz Christensen
Vice-chairman	Marie Greve
Board of Directors	Thomas Ottosen; Birgitte Hamborg Faarbæk; Laurence McGregor Vedelsdal

Source: VSK Aarhus | Bestyrelsen

Position	Name
Head coach	Jacob Eichner
Assistant manager	Mads Post
Assistant manager	Alexander Chelu
Goalkeeping coach	Rasmus From
Team leader	Gert Schytz

Source: VSK Aarhus | Herresenior | Holdstab

=== Head coaches ===
The person responsible for direction of the first senior team has traditionally been given the title of head coach/trainer. Since 2019, Jens Gjesing was given the title of manager/sports director, taking control of the football operations besides his position as head coach.

Name	Nationality	From	To	Refs
Poul Lyse and Michele Demontis	Denmark	1 July 2016	8 November 2017	
Jesper Højlund	Denmark	25 January 2018	19 November 2018	
Jens Gjesing	Denmark	19 November 2018	Present	

== Honours ==
=== Domestic ===
==== National leagues ====
- 2nd Division (DBU level 3)
  - Best league performance:
    Eighth place (1): 2019–20 (G2)
- 3rd Division (DBU level 4)
  - Best league performance:
    Third place (1) 2021–22
- Denmark Series (DBU level 4/5)
  - Winners (1): 2018–19 (G4)

==== Cups ====
- DBU Pokalen
  - Best cup performance:
    Third Round (2): 2016–17, 2019–20

== Achievements ==
=== League summary ===
- 3 seasons in the Third Highest Danish League
- 1 season in the Fourth Highest Danish League

=== Statistical breakdown season-by-season ===
Season	League										Cup	Europe / Other		Avg. Home Attendance^{1}	Top goalscorer(s)^{1}		Refs
Season	Level	Division	P	W	D	L	GF	GA	Pts	Position	Cup	Competition	Result	Avg. Home Attendance^{1}	Name	Goals	Refs
2016–17	3	Danish 2nd Division	36	10	14	12	54	57	44	17th of 24	R3	—		167	Kasper Kempel	8	
2017–18	3	Danish 2nd Division	36	10	6	20	58	72	36	23rd of 24	R2	—		151	Magnus Clemmensen	7	
2018–19	4	Denmark Series, Group 4	27	18	5	4	68	25	59	1st of 10	R1	—		—N/a	Oscar Scott Carl	13	
2019–20	3	Danish 2nd Division	23	9	2	12	27	35	29	15th of 24	R3	—		206	Jakob Rittig	6	

== See also ==
- VSK Aarhus (women)
