= Christian Tcacenco =

Danish footballer (born 2007)

Personal information
- Date of birth: 16 May 2007 (age 19)
- Place of birth: Aalborg, Denmark
- Position: Right-back

Team information
- Current team: Skive (on loan from AaB)
- Number: 7

Youth career
- AaB

Senior career*
Years	Team	Apps	(Gls)
2025–	AaB	4	(0)
2026–	→ Skive (loan)	7	(0)

International career^{‡}
2025	Moldova U19	4	(0)
- * Club domestic league appearances and goals as of 08:17, 28 September 2026 (UTC) ‡ National team caps and goals as of 18:10, 26 July 2025 (UTC)

Christian Tcacenco (born 16 May 2007) is a Moldovan professional footballer who plays as a right-back for Danish 2nd Division club Skive IK, on loan from AaB. Born in Denmark, he is of Moldovan descent.

== Career ==
Tcacenco is a product of the AaB academy. He fought his way up through the club's youth ranks and began training with the club's Danish Superliga team around the spring of 2025 due to injuries within the squad.

On 16 March 2025, Tcacenco made his official debut, coming on in the final minutes of the league match against Sønderjyske to replace Andres Jasson. On 17 May 2025, the club confirmed that Tcacenco had signed a new contract extending until June 2028. A month later, on 20 June, the club confirmed that he had been permanently promoted to the first-team squad.

On 23 July 2026, Tcacenco was sent on a season-long loan to Danish 2nd Division club Skive IK.
