= Vejlby-Risskov Idrætscenter =

Sports complex in Denmark

Coordinates: 56.1924°N 10.2103°E

Vejlby-Risskov Idrætscenter ("Vejlby-Risskov Sports Centre") is a sports complex located in Aarhus, Denmark. It is the largest of its kind in East Jutland. The complex is situated in the district of Vejlby-Risskov in the northern part of Aarhus. Its central parts consist of Vejlby Stadium, home ground of association football club VSK Aarhus, and Vejlby-Risskov Hallen, the home of basketball team Bakken Bears.

== Facilities ==
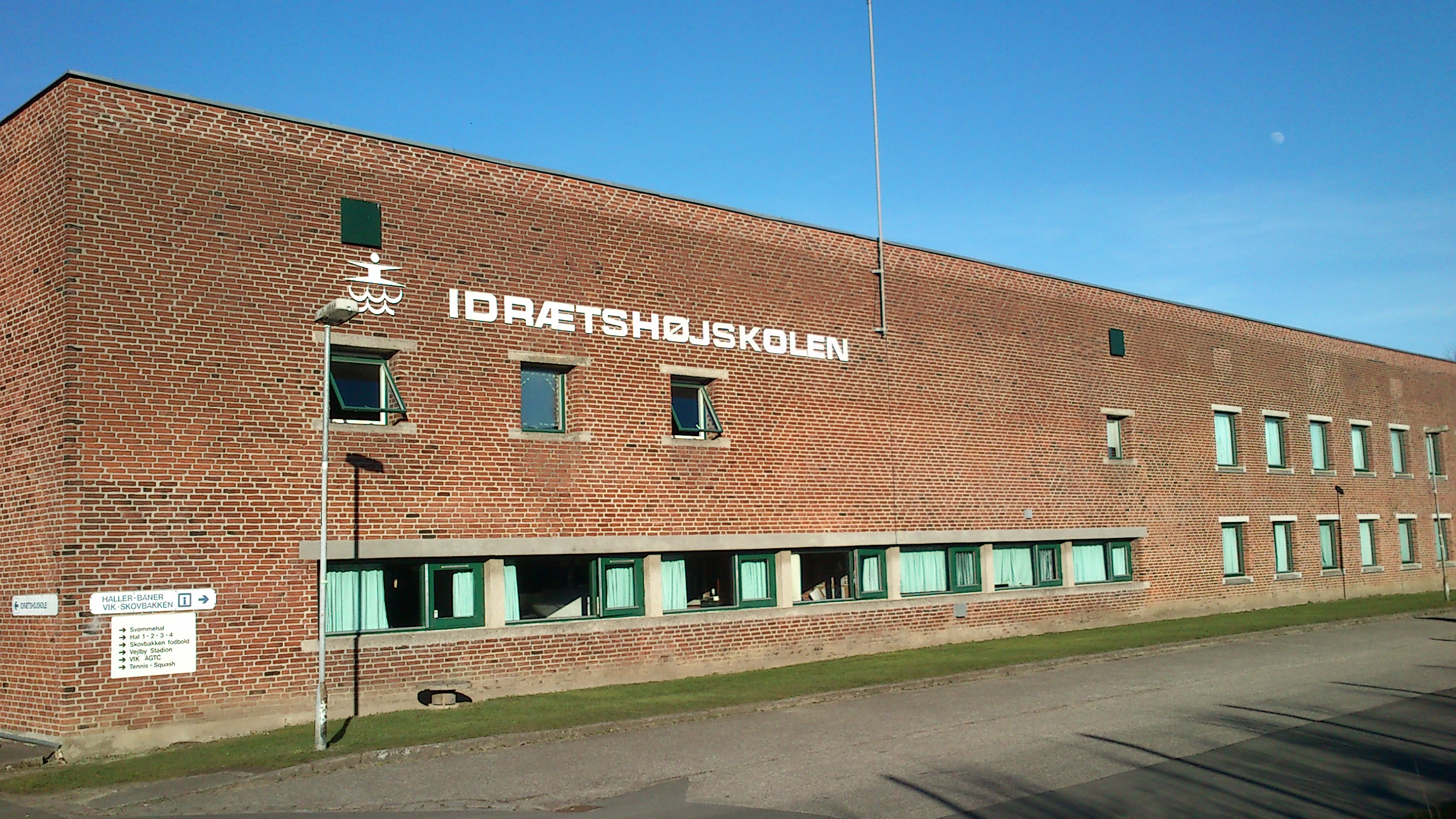
Vejlby-Risskov Idrætscenter, here the headquarters of the sports school of Idrætshøjskolen Århus.

Vejlby-Risskov Idrætscenter has its headquarters in a modernist low red brick building complex, inaugurated in 1969 and designed by architectural firm Friis & Moltke. The buildings comprise a folk high school of sports (Idrætshøjskolen Århus), four indoor sports halls – including the sports and events arena of Vejlby-Risskov Hallen – an indoor swimming pool and administrative offices. Several sports clubs also have their headquarters at the grounds of the sports complex, but at different locations. The buildings are surrounded by a total of 10 association football pitches, several outdoor tennis courts and a stadium with a capacity of 5,000 spectators. The complex covers an area of 1.5 km^{2} (150 hectares).

The complex is home to multiple sports teams from Aarhus, including VSK Aarhus; and its parent clubs IK Skovbakken and Vejlby IK, Bakken Bears, the disbanded handball team SK Aarhus, among others.

== Sports venues ==
- Vejlby Stadium, home ground for VSK Aarhus
- Vejlby-Risskov Hallen, home ground of Bakken Bears, among others
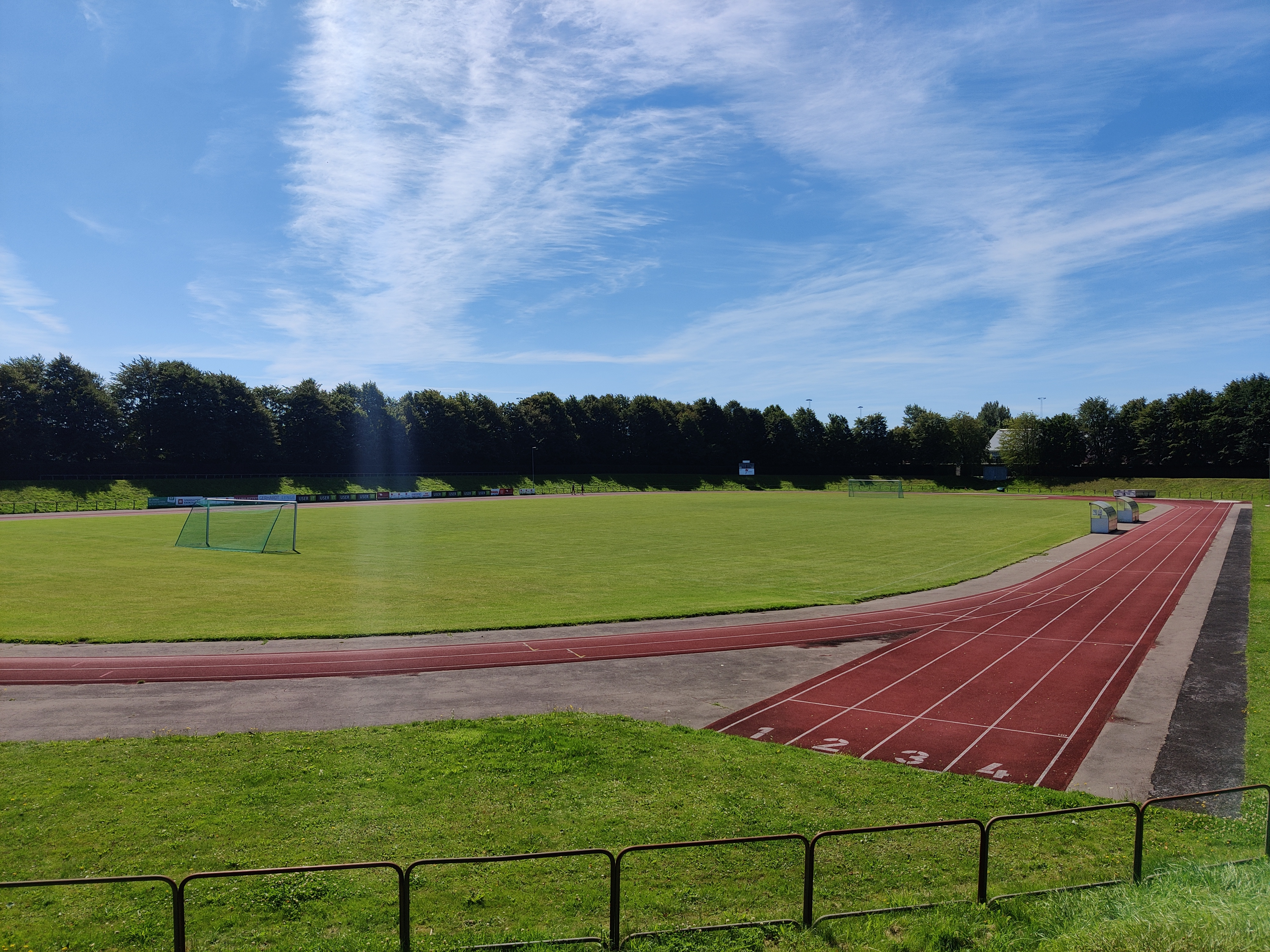
The stadium

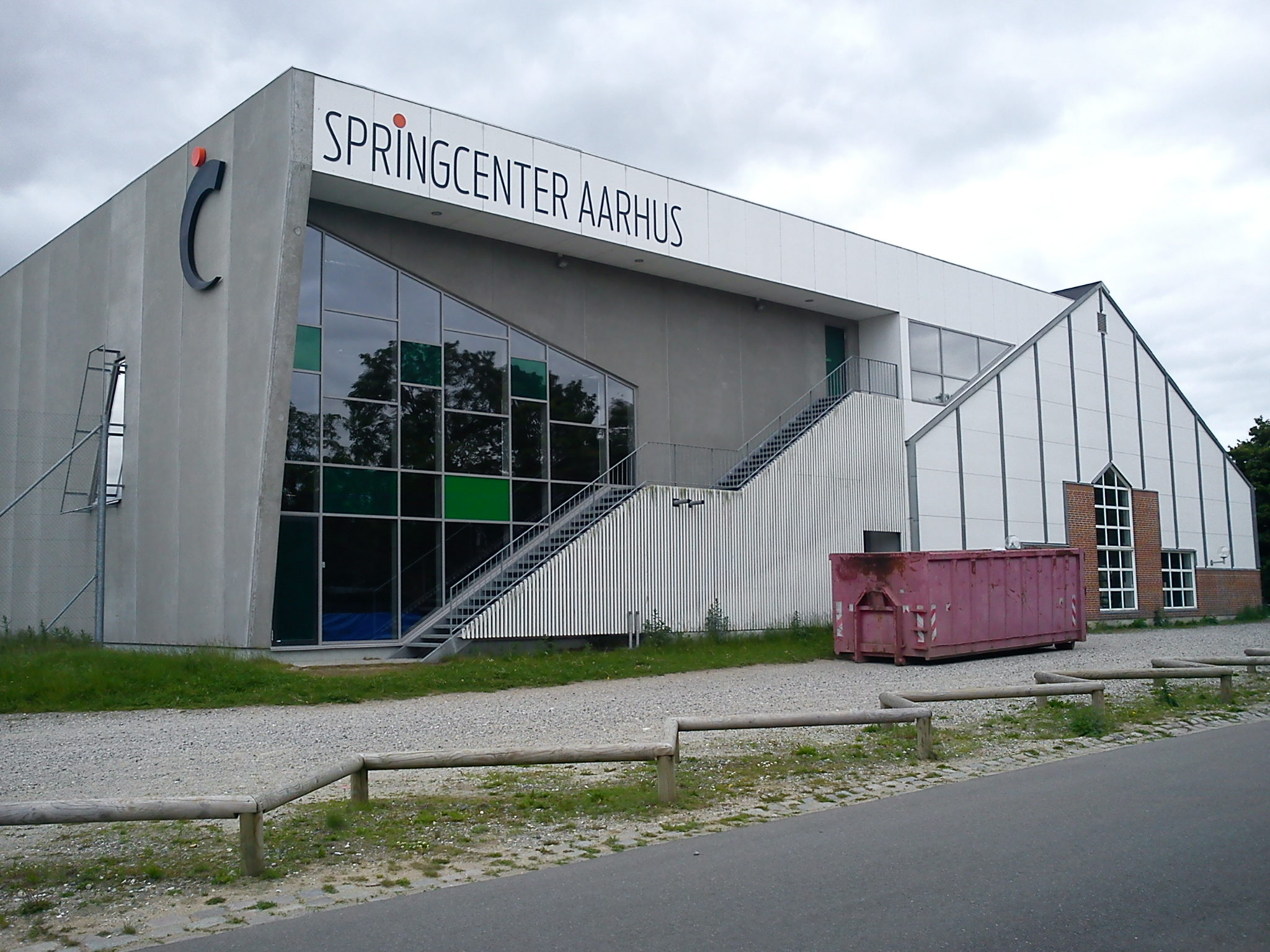
Center for gymnastics

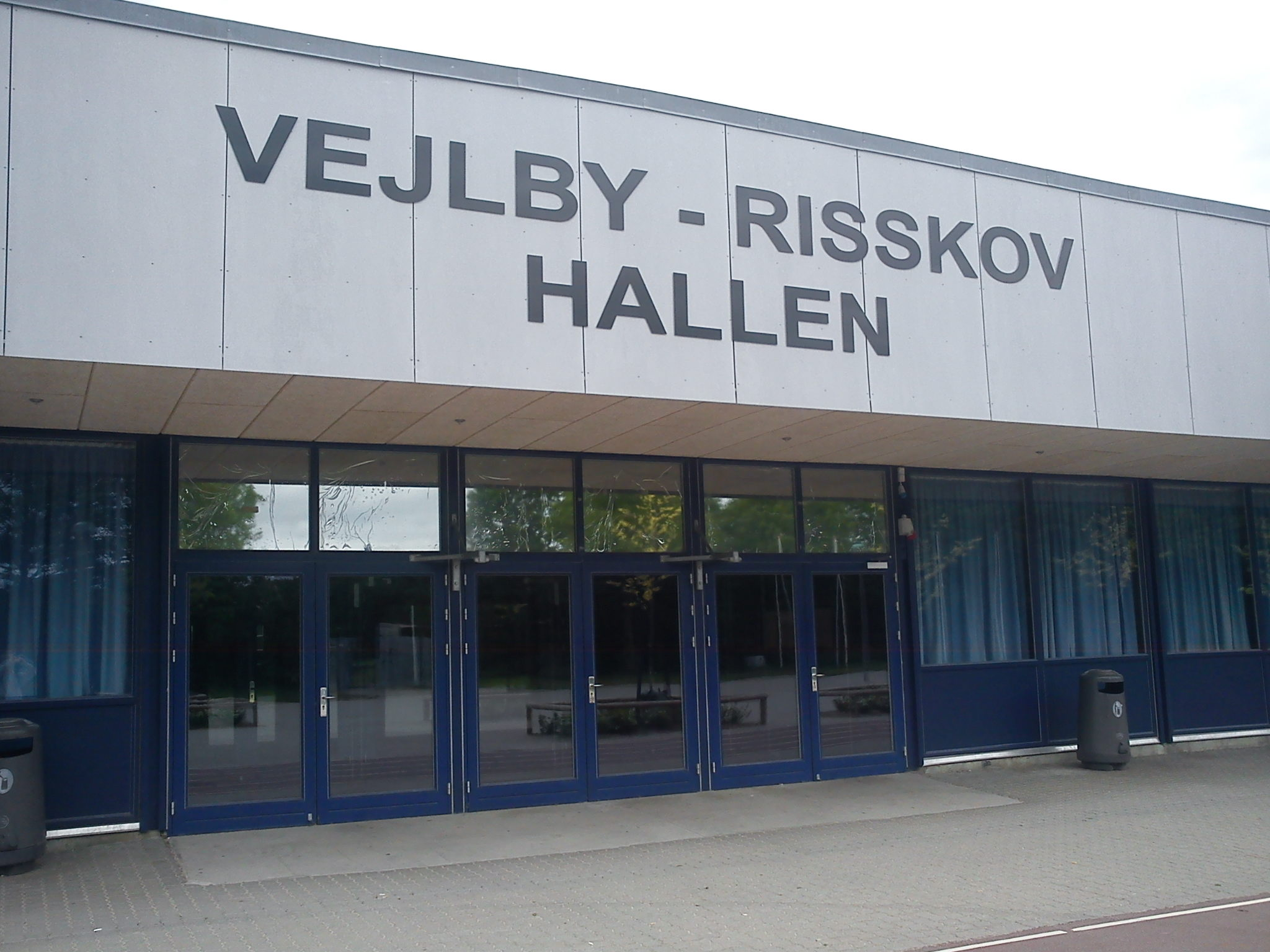
Vejlby-Risskov Hallen
