= Vejlby Stadium =

Football stadium in Denmark

Vejlby Stadium Ceres Park Vejlby
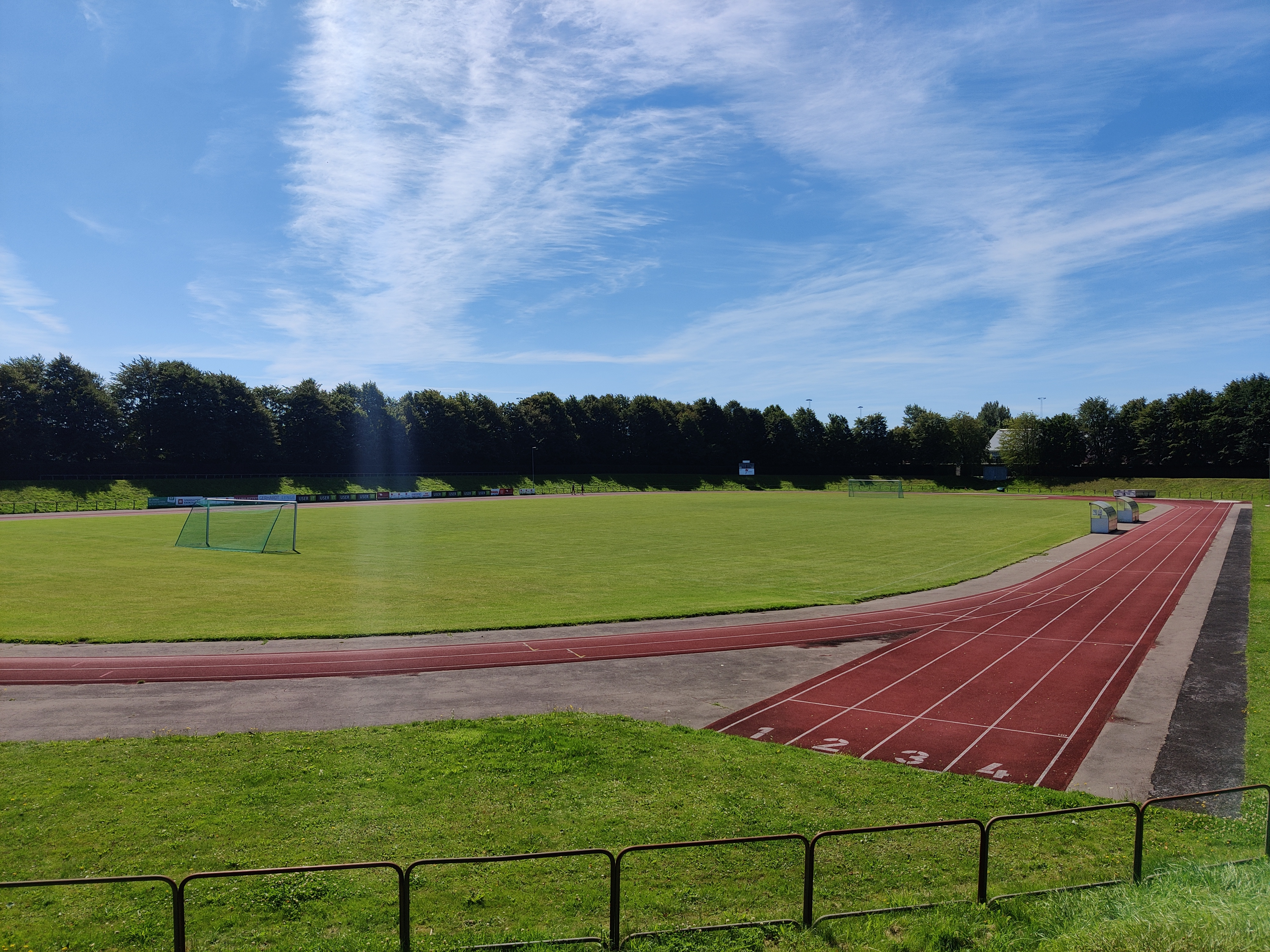
- Vejlby Stadium in 2020, before its 2024–25 conversion to Ceres Park Vejlby
- Interactive map of Vejlby Stadium; Ceres Park Vejlby
- Full name: Vejlby Stadium
- Location: Vejlby Centervej 53; DK-8240 Risskov
- Coordinates: 56°11′33″N 10°12′37″E
- Capacity: 11,500 (3,400 seated)
- Surface: Natural grass
- Record attendance: 11,763 (IK Skovbakken vs AGF, 7 September 1978)
- Field size: 105 by 68 metres (114.8 yd × 74.4 yd)

Construction
- Built: 1969
- Renovated: 2024–25 (conversion to temporary Superliga configuration)

Tenants
- IK Skovbakken (1969–2016); Vejlby IK (1969–2016); VSK Aarhus (2016–present); AGF (2025–present)

Vejlby Stadium (Danish: Vejlby Stadion) is a football stadium in Risskov, Denmark. Since February 2025 it has been known as Ceres Park Vejlby for sponsorship reasons, while serving as the temporary home of Danish Superliga club AGF during the construction of the club's new stadium in Kongelunden. It is also the home stadium of 3rd Division club VSK Aarhus, formed in 2016 through the merger of its previous principal tenants IK Skovbakken and Vejlby IK. Constructed in 1969, it is part of the sports complex known as Vejlby-Risskov Sports Centre (Danish: Vejlby-Risskov Idrætscenter) owned by Aarhus Municipality.

Vejlby Stadium's record attendance of 11,763 was set on 7 September 1978, when IK Skovbakken faced AGF in the 1st Division; the visiting side won 4–2.

== Conversion to Ceres Park Vejlby ==
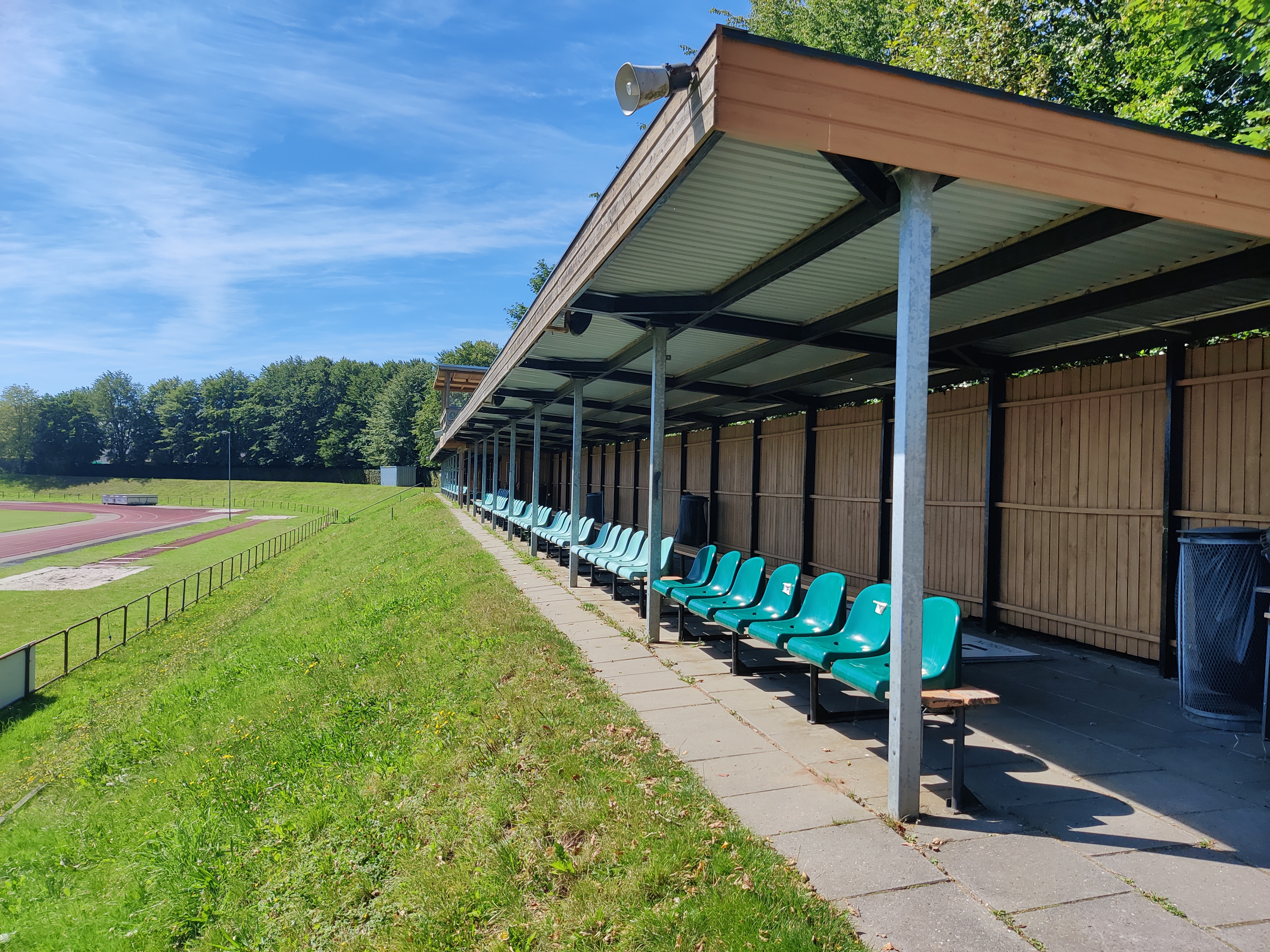
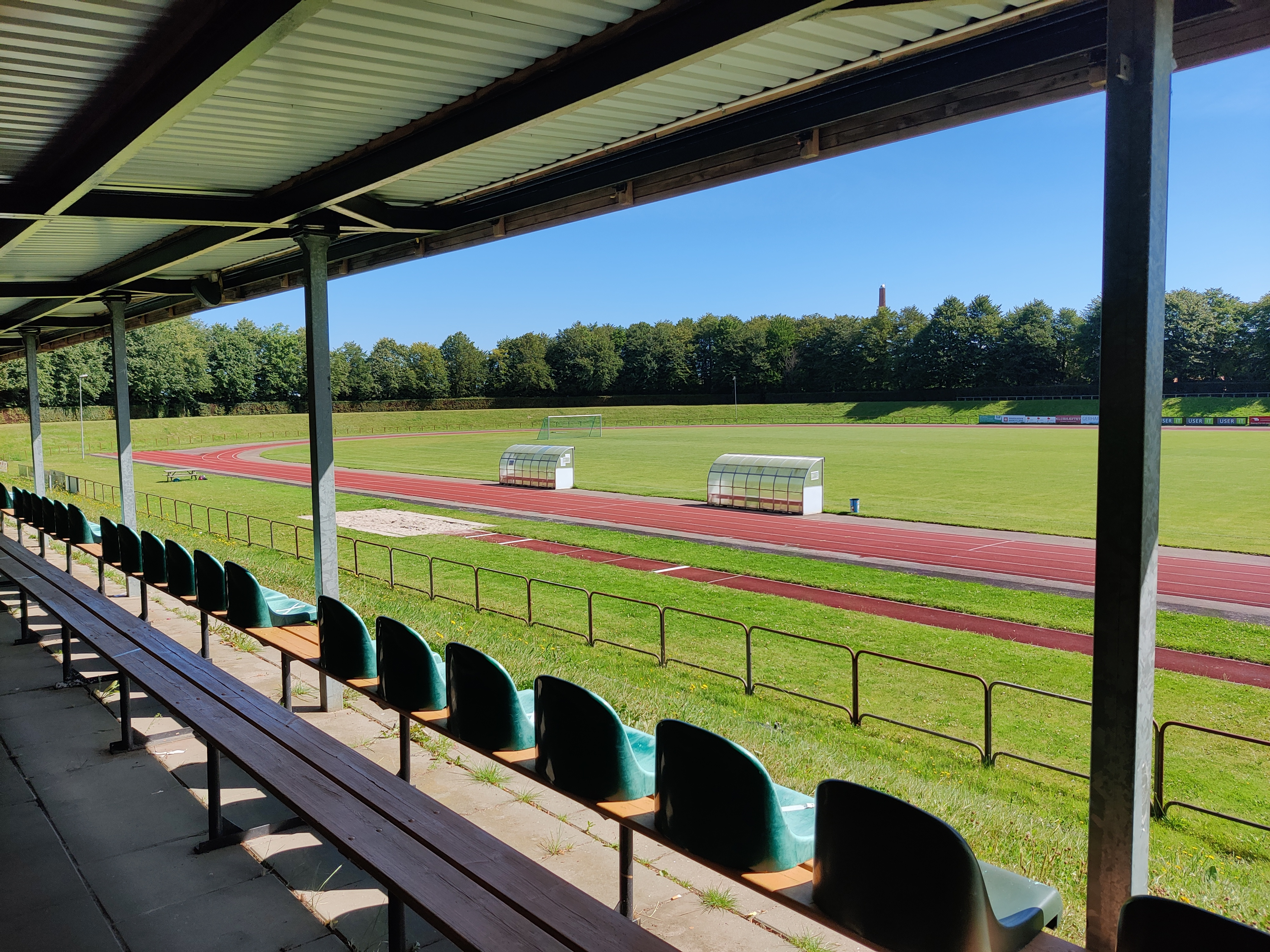
Different views from the main stand in July 2020, before the 2024–25 conversion. The original main stand was demolished and replaced for the 2025–26 season.

In May 2024, Aarhus City Council approved the conversion of Vejlby Stadium into a temporary Superliga-standard ground for AGF during the construction of the club's new stadium in Kongelunden. The project, with a total budget of around DKK 110 million, was jointly financed by Aarhus Municipality, AGF and the Salling Foundations. AGF's share of the cost was reported as roughly DKK 34 million. Work began in late 2024 and included the installation of a new hybrid grass pitch, with mobile stands, floodlights, and stadium services built around it.

The redeveloped ground, named Ceres Park Vejlby under a sponsorship agreement that carried over the name from AGF's previous home, opened in February 2025 with an initial capacity of approximately 12,000. Following criticism of sightlines and acoustics on the temporary stands during the spring of 2025, AGF announced in May 2025 that a new main grandstand would be built before the 2025–26 season, with approximately 3,400 seats compared to around 1,300 previously, taking total capacity to about 11,500.

The highest attendance during AGF's tenancy was 11,016, recorded on 22 March 2026 in a 0–0 draw with Brøndby in the Superliga championship round. AGF clinched the 2025–26 Danish Superliga title—its first national championship in forty years—on 10 May 2026 with a 2–0 away win at Brøndby, and were due to be presented with the trophy at Ceres Park Vejlby on 17 May.

== Future ==
The Kongelunden stadium project to which AGF intend to return has been delayed several times. The new ground was originally expected to be ready for the 2026–27 season in summer 2026; the completion date was put back to late 2026 in October 2024, and a further delay announced in June 2025 pushed the target to March 2027. AGF have continued to play their home fixtures at Ceres Park Vejlby in the meantime.

According to the plan adopted by Aarhus City Council in 2024, the temporary structures will be removed after AGF return to Kongelunden, and Vejlby Stadium will be rebuilt as a permanent venue with about 2,000 fixed seats, primarily for women's football and lower-tier matches.
