= Benjamin Schubert =

Danish footballer (born 1996)

Personal information
- Full name: Benjamin Tonnesen Schubert
- Date of birth: 22 September 1996 (age 30)
- Place of birth: Silkeborg, Denmark
- Height: 1.84 m (6 ft 0 in)
- Position: Goalkeeper

Team information
- Current team: Skive
- Number: 1

Youth career
- –2015: Silkeborg IF

Senior career*
Years	Team	Apps	(Gls)
2015–2018	Kjellerup IF		
2019–2020	Kolding IF	9	(0)
2021–2022	Jammerbugt	0	(0)
2022	Sønderjyske	0	(0)
2022–2023	B68 Toftir	31	(0)
2024	Black Leopards	1	(0)
2024–2025	Vestri	1	(0)
2026–	Skive	12	(0)
- * Club domestic league appearances and goals as of 21:00, 3 October 2026 (UTC)

Benjamin Tonnesen Schubert (born 22 September 1996) is a Danish professional footballer who plays as a goalkeeper for Danish 2nd Division club Skive.

== Career ==
Shubert played youth football for Silkeborg IF. His first senior club was Kjellerup IF, where he spent four seasons before leaving at the end of 2019.

In January 2019, Shubert moved to Kolding IF of the Danish 1st Division. Schubert made three appearances in his first half-season with the club, thereby contributing to Kolding’s promotion to the 2019–20 Danish 1st Division. He left the club at the end of 2020 upon the expiration of his contract.

After leaving Kolding, Shubert spent five months training with FC Olimpik Donetsk of the Ukrainian Premier League. No agreement was reached, however, and he subsequently travelled to his father’s homeland of South Africa, where he trained with a local club for several weeks.

In September 2021, Schubert was announced as a new signing for Jammerbugt FC, joining the club after first-choice goalkeeper Nicolaj Christensen suffered an injury. Without having made his debut, Schubert left the club in January 2022 to join Sønderjyske of the Danish Superliga, signing a contract until the end of the season. Schubert left the club again at the end of the season.

In September 2022, Schubert signed with Faroe Islands Premier League side B68 Toftir. After six appearances in which Schubert guarded the net and helped the team secure its top-flight status in the top Faroese league, he extended his contract to cover the 2023 season as well.

After the turn of the year in 2024, Schubert again travelled to South Africa and trained with Black Leopards of the South African second tier with a view to a transfer. Registration issues meant the move was not finalised until 2 April 2023, the very day he made his debut in a 2–4 defeat to Venda FC. Later that month, Schubert—by his own account—was eager to leave the club, describing his experience there as completely insane and truly grotesque. He consequently terminated his contract shortly thereafter. The ordeal did not dampen Schubert’s resolve; he subsequently trained with another South African top-flight club. However, disagreements prevented the move from being completed.

In August 2024, Schubert signed with Vestri in the Icelandic Besta deild karla. On 22 August 2025, he won the Icelandic Cup with Vestri.

== Personal life ==
Shubert's father is South African, while his mother is Danish.
