= Mumle =

Danish singer (born 2003)

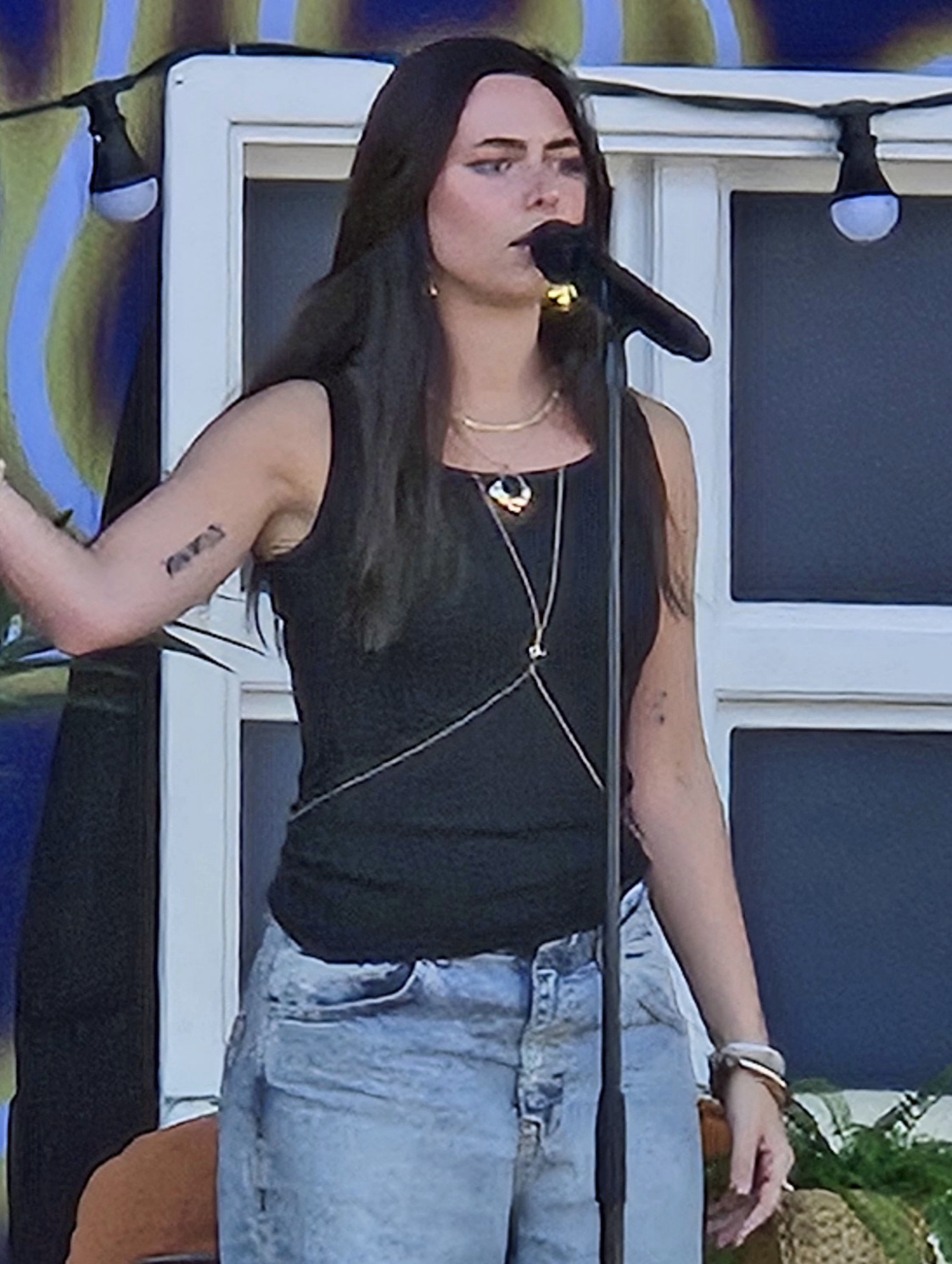
- Mumle in 2025

Background information
- Born: Julia Kathrine Hansen; 24 October 2003 (age 23); Haderslev, Denmark
- Genre: Pop
- Occupation: Singer
- Years active: 2023–present
- Label: Universal Music Group
- Website: www.mumlemumler.dk

Julia Kathrine Hansen (born 24 October 2003), known professionally as Mumle, is a Danish singer. She has released one studio album and one extended play. Her song "Det modsatte", released in 2023, saw her nominated for several awards including Danish Hit of the Year from the Danish Music Awards.

== Early life ==
Mumle was born and raised in Haderslev, but moved with her family to Vamdrup in 2022. She is the sister of footballer Mads Hansen, and their father, Rasmus, also played for Haderslev FK. A hip injury in her youth derailed her ability to pursue horse riding professionally. As recently as 2023, she worked as a bartender in Kolding.

== Career ==
Finding a Facebook post from a record label seeking a Danish-language artist, Mumle submitted several videos. After sending an email containing the videos, which were recorded of her singing in her car, she received a positive response the following day. She was soon placed into contact with producer Frederik Carstens, who helped shape her early career. She has cited Sys Bjerre and Lukas Graham as influences on her music.

Mumle released her first song "Moonwalkman" on 23 June 2023. After signing to a contract with Universal Music Group in August, she released her second song "Det modsatte" on 22 September. By December, she was included on DR Music's list of possible breakthrough stars for 2024. "Det modsatte" became one of the top 10 most streamed songs in Denmark for 2024, where she was the only female artist included in the list.

By the end of 2024, "Det modsatte" was nominated for Danish Hit of the Year at the Danish Music Awards, where she also performed live. Mumle herself was also nominated as the New Danish Name of the Year at the Danish Music Awards, and later at the 2025 Gaffa Awards.

In 2025, Mumle performed at several music festivals including the Jelling Musikfestival and Roskilde. She finished 2025 with two of the top 10 highest-earning songs in Denmark.

=== Debut album ===
Mumle began teasing a new album in February 2026, playing several unreleased songs during a concert in Odense and three others which had been released as singles. After a spring tour which concluded in March, she released her first studio album on 17 April 2026. Dig, mig og en dårlig boligsituation released to mixed reviews. Soundvenue gave the album three-of-six stars, who called the album charming and noted Mumle's strength as a songwriter. Gaffa gave the album five-of-six stars and, like Soundvenue, found the story of the songs relatable to everyday problems.

== Discography ==
=== Studio albums ===
Title	Details	Peak chart positions
Title	Details	DEN
Dig, mig og en dårlig boligsituation	Release date: 17 April 2026; Label: Universal Music Denmark	3

=== Extended plays ===
Title	Details	Peak chart positions	Certifications
Title	Details	DEN	Certifications
Mumler ikke	Released: 25 October 2024; Label: Capitol Records	8	IFPI DEN: Gold

=== Singles ===
Title	Year	Peak chart positions	Certifications	Album
Title	Year	DEN	Certifications	Album
"Moonwalkman"	2023	—		Non-album singles
"Det modsatte"	2023	5	IFPI DEN: 3× Platinum	Non-album singles
"Julefred"	2023	—		Non-album singles
"Et for dig"	2024	—	IFPI DEN: Gold	Non-album singles
"Hvor Solen Ik'Skinner" (Mumle & Svea S)	2024	39	IFPI DEN: 2× Platinum	Non-album singles
"Hele Vejen" (Omar feat. Mumle)	2025	1	IFPI DEN: 3× Platinum	Non-album singles
"Dårligt Match"	2025	—	IFPI DEN: Gold	Dig, mig og en dårlig boligsituation
"Fire uger"	2025	30		Dig, mig og en dårlig boligsituation
"Walk of Shame"	2026	35		Dig, mig og en dårlig boligsituation
"Vagabond" (with Malte Ebert)	2026	19		Non-album single
"—" denotes a recording that did not chart or was not released in that territory.

== Awards and nominations ==
Year	Award	Category	Recipient(s)	Result	Ref.
2024	Danish Music Awards	Danish Hit of the Year	"Det modsatte"	Nominated	
2024	Danish Music Awards	New Danish Name of the Year	Mumle	Nominated	
2025	GAFFA Awards	New Danish Name of the Year	Mumle	Nominated	
