= Peter Hyballa =

German football manager

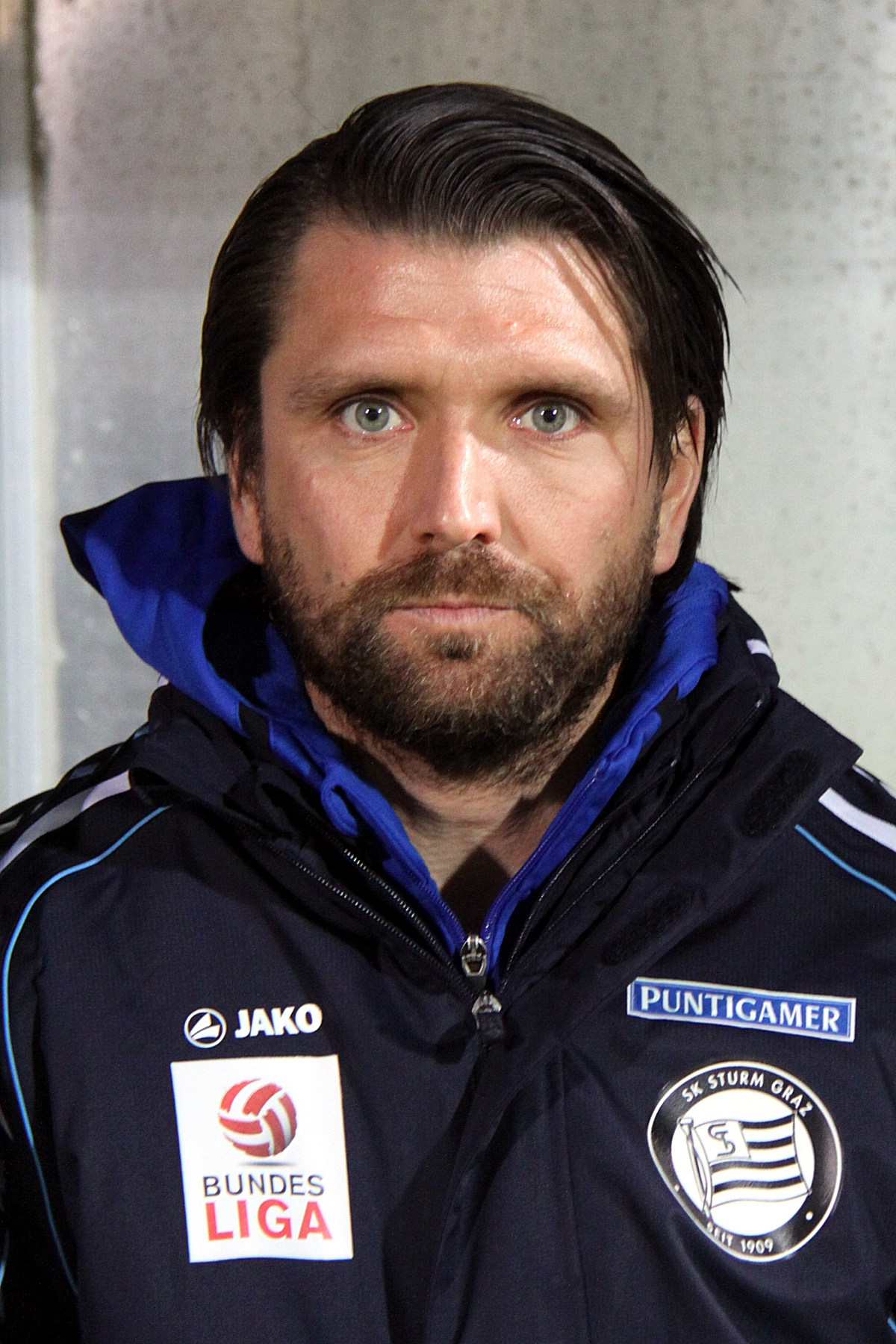
- Hyballa with Sturm Graz in 2013

Personal information
- Date of birth: 5 December 1975 (age 50)
- Place of birth: Bocholt, West Germany

Managerial career
- Years: Team
- 2002–2003: Ramblers Windhoek
- 2010–2011: Alemannia Aachen
- 2012: Red Bull Salzburg II
- 2012–2013: Sturm Graz
- 2016–2017: NEC
- 2018–2020: DAC Dunajská Streda
- 2020: NAC Breda
- 2020–2021: Wisła Kraków
- 2021: Esbjerg fB
- 2021: Türkgücü München
- 2022: AS Trenčín
- 2023: NAC Breda
- 2024: Sekhukhune United

Peter Hyballa (born 5 December 1975) is a German professional football manager. He served as manager at top-clubs in Germany, Austria, the Netherlands, Poland, Denmark and Slovakia.

Before his career as a manager, Hyballa coached some of the best youth teams in Germany, including the U19 sides of Arminia Bielefeld, VfL Wolfsburg, Bayer Leverkusen and Borussia Dortmund.

In 2010, he took over as head coach of 2. Bundesliga club Alemannia Aachen. He then managed the Red Bull Salzburg reserves and Sturm Graz in Austria for two years. From 2014 to 2016, he was assistant and youth coach at Bayer Leverkusen. Hyballa was then appointed manager of NEC in 2016, where he quickly became known for his fanatical way of coaching, his controversial statements in interviews and behavior during matches. He moved to Slovak club DAC Dunajská Streda in 2018, after being fired in NEC due to poor results. With a successful start he was leading the club to a second-place finish in 2019. Shorter spells with NAC Breda and Wisła Kraków followed, where he part ways with the club after a few months. In May 2021, he became the head coach of Danish club Esbjerg fB, but resigned a few months later followed at Türkgücü München and AS Trenčín, before returning to NAC Breda.

== Early life ==
Hyballa was born in Bocholt, North Rhine-Westphalia to Yvonne and Hans-Joachim Hyballa. His mother is Dutch and hails from Rotterdam, and met his German father, a deacon, in Hamburg in 1971.

== Managerial career ==
=== Early career ===
In his first coaching positions, Hyballa was initially in charge of youth teams, for example at his hometown clubs Borussia Bocholt and 1. FC Bocholt, where he coached the U17s for two years. In 1998 he was discovered by Preußen Münster, where he became responsible for the U17 for the next three years. In 2001, Hyballa moved from Münster to Arminia Bielefeld, where he took on the position of U19 youth coach. After a short stint from 2002 to 2003 at Namibian club Ramblers Windhoek, where had his first head coaching job, he returned to Germany.

From 2003 to 2007, Hyballa coached the U19s of VfL Wolfsburg and in 2007, he led the team to the final of the DFB U19 Cup, which was lost 1–2 to 1860 Munich.

In the summer of 2007, Hyballa took over the U19s from Borussia Dortmund. There, he won the 2008 Westphalia Cup, the 2009 West German title, finished runner-up of the 2009 DFB U19 Cup as well as runner-up to the 2008–09 Under 19 Bundesliga. The cup final was lost to the youth team of SC Freiburg on penalties, and in the final of the German U19 championship Hyballa's team was defeated by Thomas Tuchel's U19s from 1. FSV Mainz 05 with 1–2 the final score.

On 15 April 2010, Hyballa signed a two-year contract as head coach of Rot-Weiss Essen. After the club filed for bankruptcy on 4 June 2010, the contract was dissolved and Alemannia Aachen hired him as head coach of their 2. Bundesliga team from the 2010–11 season on a two-year contract. On 13 September 2011, Hyballa and his assistant coach Eric van der Luer were given leave of absence, and their contracts were terminated by mutual agreement. At that time, Alemannia Aachen only had three points and scored one goal, which meant that they were bottom of the league table.

From January 2012 to June 2012, Peter Hyballa was the coach of the Red Bull Salzburg reserves, where he was tasked with transitioning youth players to the first team.

For the 2012–13 season, Hyballa signed a two-year contract with Sturm Graz, but was dismissed while in the race for a UEFA Europa League spot on 22 April 2013.

For the final games of the 2013–14 season, Hyballa returned to Germany as Sascha Lewandowski's assistant coach at Bayer Leverkusen. Lewandowski had become caretaker coach after Sami Hyypiä was dismissed from as manager. Both signed a contract until the end of the season and achieved the goal of qualifying for the UEFA Champions League. After the Bundesliga season was over, Hyballa stayed with Leverkusen in a new position; in June 2014 he signed a two-year contract as head coach of the Leverkusen U19s.

After the end of his contract at the end in June 2016, Hyballa left Leverkusen.

=== NEC ===
In May 2016, Eredivisie club NEC announced that Hyballa would become manager of the club from the summer, signing a two-year contract.

Hyballa immediately stood out for his highly energetic and modern way of coaching, his high-pressing style football and extreme motivational behavior during matches. Hyballa managed to keep the team in mid-table during the first half of the season, but the team would experience a drop after the winter break. Despite this, the club hinted at a contract extension, praising Hyballa's handling of players, personality and drive. After the team ended up in the relegation zone after successive defeats, the board offered to place a more experienced manager alongside him in April 2017. Hyballa declined the offer, which he saw as "panic football". On 22 April, after a defeat against Excelsior, the team were met by angry fans. Hyballa addressed the fans on behalf of the club and managed to turn the situation around.

Two days later, on 24 April 2017, he was dismissed, two matches prior to the end of the competition, due to poor results and imminent relegation.

=== DAC Dunajská Streda ===
The German Football Association announced in May 2018 that Hyballa would become a teacher at the German coaching course. However, he broke the contract in July 2018, after he was appointed head coach of Slovak Super Liga club DAC Dunajská Streda. He managed to lead the club to a position as runner-up in the 2018–19 season – their highest finish in 16 years.

He departed the club in January 2020 after failing to reach an agreement for a contract extension.

=== NAC Breda ===
He coached NAC Breda between February and July 2020, as the successor to Ruud Brood. He would eventually leave after five months.

=== Wisła Kraków ===
On 3 December 2020, he signed a contract with the Polish Ekstraklasa side Wisła Kraków. On 14 May 2021 the Polish club announced that they had parted ways with Hyballa.

=== Esbjerg fB ===
Hyballa signed a two-year contract with Danish club Esbjerg fB on 24 May 2021. Less than two months into his tenure, Danish newspaper B.T. reported that some players voiced feedback of the too demanding nature of the sessions. The following day, Spillerforeningen, the Danish Player's Association, reprimanded the Esbjerg board after the American chairman Michael Kalt had toned down the conflict and informed JydskeVestkysten that only a few players were involved in the demand. One day later, Hyballa demoted four key players to the reserve team: Yuriy Yakovenko, Jakob Ankersen, Kevin Conboy and Zean Dalügge. On 15 July, Esbjerg fB were reported to the Danish Working Environment Authority (Danish: Arbejdstilsynet) by Spillerforeningen after reports came out concerns about his approach including allegations of high physical and mental intensity. The following week, Hyballa stated that he had always acted appropriately, and that he had only tried to motivate his players. On 11 August after a bad start of the season, Hyballa resigned as manager of Esbjerg fB and was replaced by Roland Vrabec.

=== Türkgücü München ===
On 20 September 2021, he was appointed as the new head coach of Türkgücü München. He was sacked in November 2021.

=== AS Trenčín ===
Following the release in Munich, Hyballa returned to Fortuna Liga to manage AS Trenčín. Hyballa was released after less than two months after his appointment on 27 July 2022 due to "mutual evaluation of the current situation". His assistant Marián Zimen took on the managerial duties on a caretaker basis after the split. After just two league matchdays, in a press conference following 4-0 away defeat to reigning champions of Slovan Bratislava, Hyballa was notably critical of the lack of quality and low transfer activity in the club.

=== Return to NAC Breda ===
On 18 January 2023, Hyballa was presented as NAC Breda's new head coach, following the dismissal of Robert Molenaar. This marked his return to the Netherlands after leaving NAC in 2020 due to a conflict with then-technical director Tom van den Abbeele. He finished the 2022–23 season in 6th place, but lost in the promotion playoffs against FC Emmen. He was sacked on 13 September 2023 by the club.

=== Sekhukhune United ===
On 30 June 2024, Hyballa was appointed head coach of South African Premiership club Sekhukhune United. Hyballa and the club part ways before the start of the competitive season. On 10 August 2024, Sekhukhune United officially confirmed Hyballa's departure by mutual consent, without him having taken charge of the team in a competitive match.

== Manager Profile ==
=== Tactics ===
Peter Hyballa is known for his high intensity attack-oriented coaching philosophy which often is associated with pressing an quick transitions. His approach emphasizes aggressive ball recovery, vertical play and constant pressure on the opponent in order to create immediate scoring opportunities. He also has been referred to as "Mr Gegenpressing" in certain media profiles, with his coaching work linked to counter-pressing and quick transitions.

=== Reception ===
Peter Hyballa has been recognized for working with players to assist in developing their skills. He has been described as a high-pressing coach with unique tactical identity. He is also associated with the development of the term "deep runs" which emphasizes tactical tool in modern football that focuses on intelligent movements to create space and generates attacking momentum.

== Career statistics ==
As of 9 September 2023

Managerial record by club and tenure
Team	From	To	Record				
Team	From	To	G	W	D	L	Win %
Ramblers Windhoek	1 July 2002	30 June 2003	—	—	—	—	—
Alemannia Aachen	1 July 2010	13 September 2011	46	15	13	18	32.61
Red Bull Salzburg II	4 January 2012	13 May 2012	—	—	—	—	—
Sturm Graz	14 May 2012	22 April 2013	33	14	9	10	42.42
NEC	1 July 2016	27 April 2017	33	7	7	19	21.21
DAC Dunajská Streda	16 July 2018	3 January 2020	64	37	10	17	57.81
NAC Breda	3 February 2020	3 July 2020	7	4	2	1	57.14
Wisła Kraków	2 December 2020	14 May 2021	18	5	5	8	27.78
Esbjerg fB	24 May 2021	11 August 2021	3	0	1	2	0.00
Türkgücü München	20 September 2021	23 November 2021	7	2	0	5	28.57
AS Trenčín	12 June 2022	27 July 2022	2	0	1	1	0.00
NAC Breda	18 January 2023	13 September 2023	28	15	2	11	53.57
Sekhukhune United	1 July 2024	10 August 2024	0	0	0	0	—
Total			228	91	48	89	39.91
