= Souheib Dhaflaoui =

Tunisian footballer (born 1996)

Personal information
- Full name: Souheib Dhaflaoui
- Date of birth: 8 May 1996 (age 30)
- Place of birth: Copenhagen, Denmark
- Height: 1.68 m (5 ft 6 in)
- Position: Winger

Team information
- Current team: Helsingør

Youth career
- 2000–2007: HB
- 2007–2008: Østerbro IF
- 2008–2012: B.93
- 2012–2015: Nordsjælland

Senior career*
Years	Team	Apps	(Gls)
2015–2017	Nordsjælland	8	(0)
2016	→ Helsingør (loan)	8	(0)
2017–2019	Næstved	46	(9)
2019–2020	Roskilde	31	(3)
2020–2022	B.93	53	(20)
2022–2024	Næstved	47	(7)
2024–	Helsingør	23	(0)
2025	→ Fremad Amager (loan)	10	(1)
- * Club domestic league appearances and goals as of 16:22, 1 January 2026 (UTC)

Souheib Dhaflaoui (born 8 May 1996) is a Danish professional footballer who plays as a winger for FC Helsingør.

== Private life ==
Dhaflaoui was born to Tunisian parents and has a Tunisian passport. He applied for a Danish passport, so he could play for Denmark. He has said that his favourite player is Philippe Coutinho.

== Club career ==
=== Nordsjælland ===
In 2012 at the age of 16, Dhaflaoui signed a three-year youth contract with FC Nordsjælland, coming from B.93. After a game in February 2012, where Dhaflaoui became the matchwinner for the first team of B.93 at the age of 15, he became a hot name and was wanted by several Danish clubs.

In July 2015, at the age of 19, Dhaflaoui was promoted in to Nordsjælland's first team squad and at the same time also signed a full-time senior contract with the club.

Dhaflaoui got his official debut for Nordsjælland on 3 August 2015. Dhaflaoui started on the bench, but replaced Emiliano Marcondes in the 93rd minute in a 2–1 victory against AaB in the Danish Superliga.

==== Loan to Helsingør ====
On 31 August 2016 it was confirmed, that Danish 1st Division side, FC Helsingør, had signed Dhaflaoui on loan. He got shirt number 27.

He played 8 league matches in the Danish 1st Division before leaving the club on 31 December 2016.

==== Back at Nordsjælland ====
After his loan spell at FC Helsingør, Nordsjælland announced on 7 January 2017, that Dhaflaoui together with one of his teammates, was going on a trial in the United States at a four-day annual showcase called 'Super Draft' in the MLS Combine, trying to gain a contract in the Major League Soccer.

Dhaflaoui didn't play a single match after his return from his loan spell at Helsingør, and was only in the match-squad for one league game. FC Nordsjælland confirmed on 30 May 2017, that Dhaflaoui's contract wouldn't be extended and he would leave the club at the end of it, which was on 1 July 2017.

=== Næstved ===
On 31 July 2017 it was confirmed, that Dhaflaoui together with his friend, Tarik Mourihrib, had joined the Danish 2nd Division club Næstved BK. He left the club at the end of the 2018/19 season.

=== Roskilde ===
Dhaflaoui joined FC Roskilde on 23 July 2019.

=== Return to B93 ===
On 4 September 2020 it was confirmed, that Dhaflaoui had returned to B.93.

=== Return to Næstved ===
On 7 June 2022 Dhaflaoui confirmed, that he had signed with his former - and newly promoted Danish 1st Division - club Næstved BK for the upcoming 2022–23 season. On 22 January 2024 Næstved confirmed that they had terminated the agreement with Dhaflaoui by mutual consent, six months before the player's contract was due to expire. This was because Dhaflaoui was finding it increasingly difficult to combine his civilian work with his job as a footballer at Næstved.

=== FC Helsingør ===
On 23 January 2024, Dhaflaoui moved to Danish 1st Division side FC Helsingør, a club he had played for earlier, on a deal until the end of 2025.

On August 27, 2025, it was confirmed that Dhaflaoui switched to Fremad Amager on a loan deal for the remainder of the year, at which point his agreement with Helsingør also expired.
