= Skive IK =

Football club in Skive, Denmark

- Full name: Skive Idræts Klub
- Nickname: Sikkerne (The SIKs)
- Short name: SIK
- Founded: 28 March 1901; 125 years ago
- Ground: Hancock Arena
- Capacity: 6,000
- Chairman: Søren Østergaard Hansen
- Head coach: Anders Jensen
- League: Danish 2nd Division
- 2025–26: Danish 2nd Division, 9th of 12
- Website: sik-elite.dk
Home colours	Away colours

Skive Idræts Klub, commonly known as Skive IK, SIK (especially locally) or simply Skive, is a Danish professional football club based in Skive, Central Denmark Region. Founded in 1901, the club is affiliated with the DBU Jutland association and play their home games at Hancock Arena. The club colours are yellow and blue.

== History ==
Historically, Skive are a lower division team, who, in recent years have performed above their expectations with a solid place in the second-tier Danish 1st Division. Their best result came in the 2010–11 season, where they finished fourth in the 1st Division. In club history, Skive's most renowned players are AaB club icon and Danish international Rasmus Würtz, who played at the club during his youth, and Christian Lundberg, who played for various clubs in Denmark, Greece and Faroe Islands.

On 4 May 1971, Skive IK played against English club Leicester City. Leicester narrowly won the match 1–0 after a goal by Mike Stringfellow, and would, at the end of the season, reach promotion to the English top tier. In the same period, Skive also faced German clubs Hamburger SV and Hannover 96 in friendlies.

In 2005, the club began its rise through the division, promoting from the fourth-tier Denmark Series and since then striding straight through the third-tier 2nd Division. Recently promoted, Skive ended in a respectable 10th place in the 1st Division league table despite struggling early in the season. Thus, Skive had their first win in the 12th matchday; a home 4–3 home win over FC Fredericia on 21 October 2007, after having been down 0–2 earlier in the game. On 1 May 2010, Skive beat archrivals Viborg FF 2–0 at home, which was their first win over Viborg in 50 years.

Skive's historically best result came in the 2010–11 season when they, via a 0–1 win away over Vejle Boldklub Kolding in the last round of the season, finished in a surprising 4th place in the 1st Division, ahead of Brønshøj Boldklub and FC Fredericia. Skive's captain Martin Thomsen was named 1st Division Player of the Year after the strong season, where he scored 12 goals from midfield.

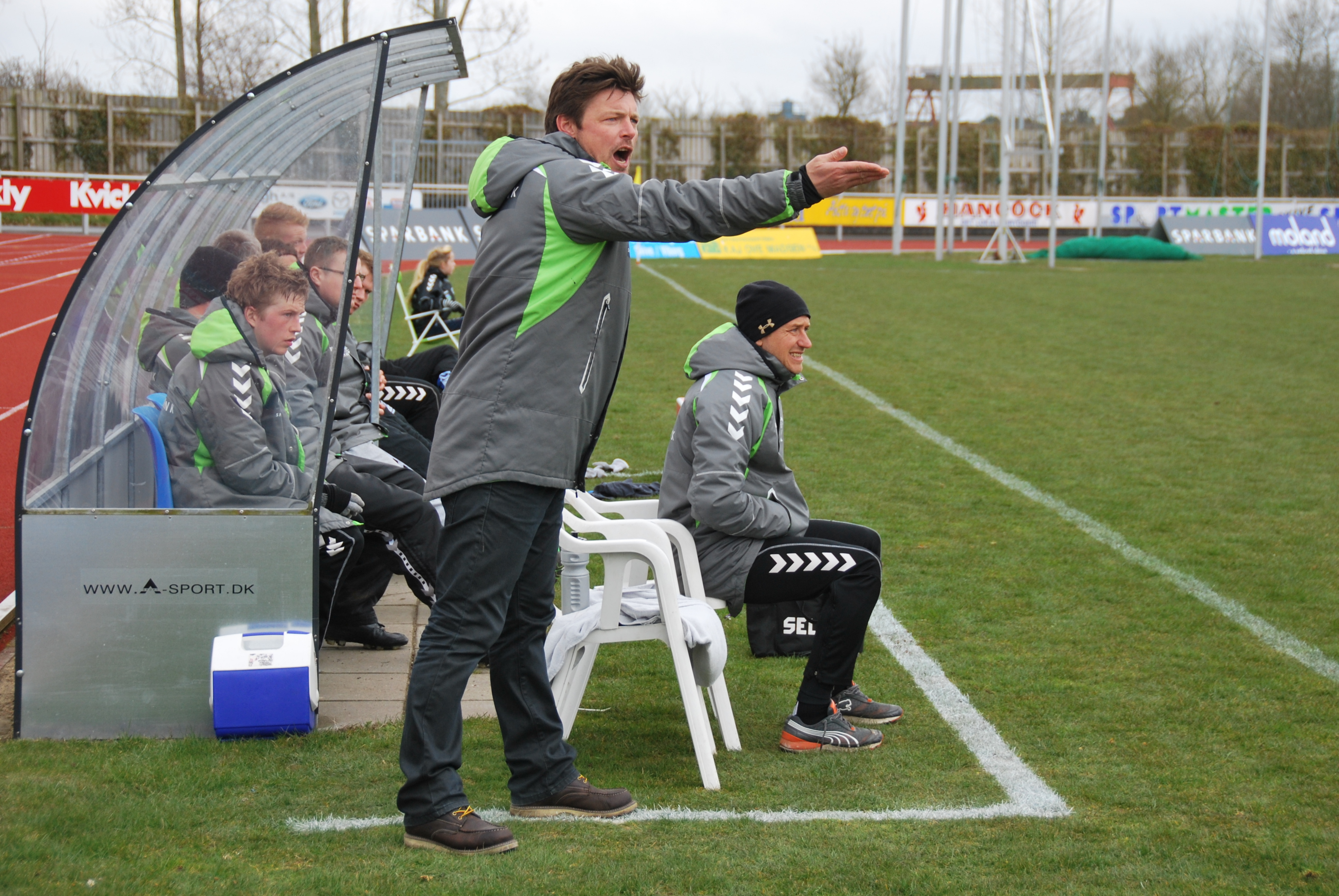
Former head coach Michael Hansen in April 2012. Sitting on the right is former assistant Claus Madsen.

In the 2012–13 season, Skive finished in relegation spots in the 1st Division, which resulted in relegation to the 2nd Division West. As a consequence of the relegation, Skive IK and head coach Michael Hansen parted ways. Nine players also left Skive. Assistant coach Claus Madsen took over the vacant coaching seat with the aim of returning the club to the second tier. After the first six months of the 2013–14 season, Skive went on winter break undefeated with a lead of nine points to the nearest pursuer. Still, a change of coach proved necessary. Madsen was forced to resign for personal reasons, and Jakob Michelsen took over as the new head coach. Madsen continued the season as assistant coach. Under Michelsen's leadership, Skive increased their lead and ended the season in a historically strong first place, 22 points down to second place, securing their return to the country's second best tier from the 2014–15 season.

=== Recent cup history ===
In 2004, Skive qualified for the quarter-finals of the Danish Cup, despite finishing in the bottom of the third-tier 2nd Division. They would face FC Copenhagen, and were knocked out after losing 0–2 at home after two goals by Peter Møller in the second half.

In the 2007–08 Danish Cup, Skive once again qualified for the quarter-finals of the tournament. This time, the club lost 0–4 at home to Esbjerg fB. The following season, Skive got revenge against Esbjerg fB in the cup tournament when the draw for the 3rd round resulted in a visit from Esbjerg. Skive won the match 2–1 after two goals by Thomas Dalgaard. The fourth round, however, was the final stop for Skive when they lost 5–2 away to Lyngby Boldklub.

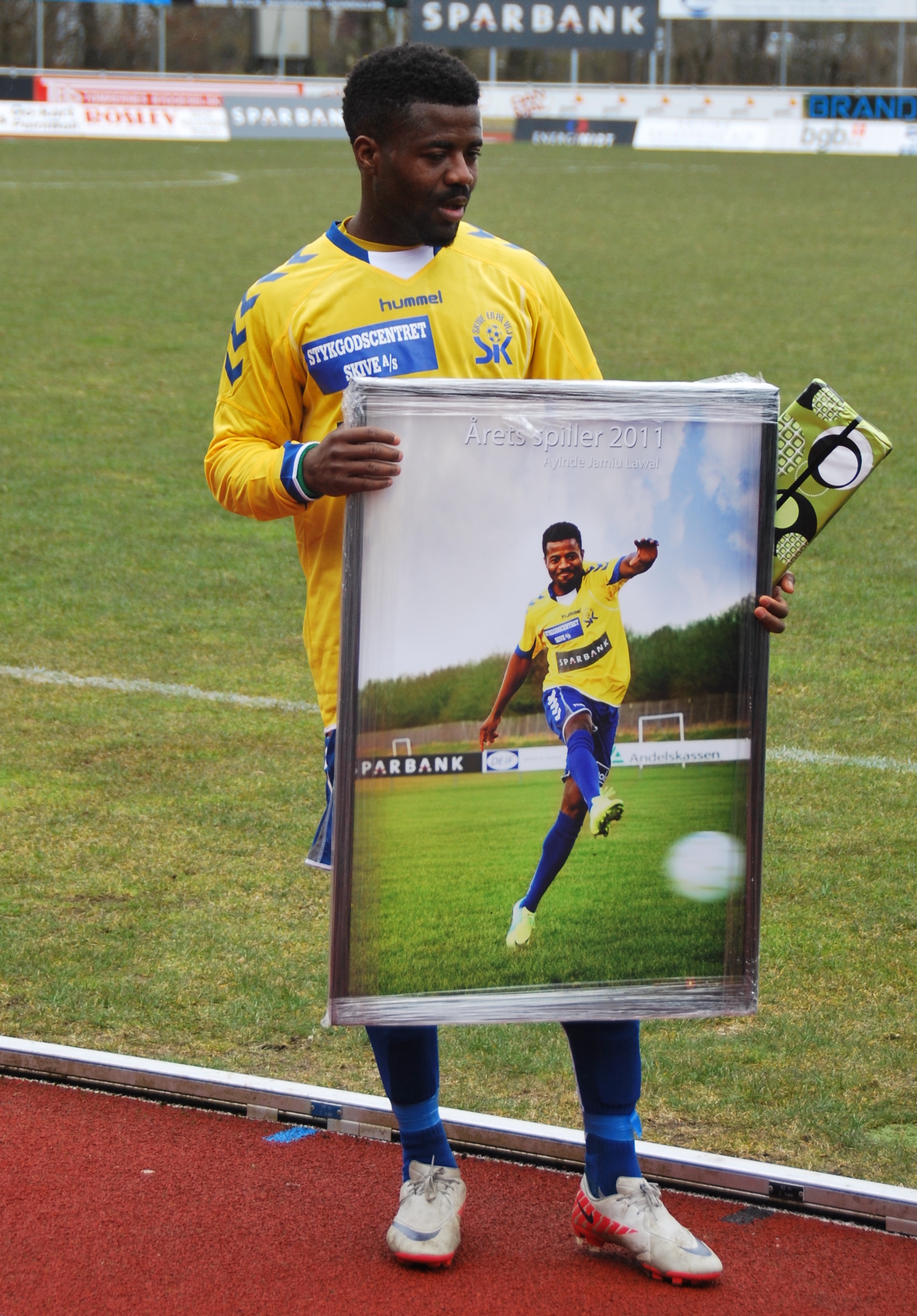
Ayinde Jamiu Lawal receives the Player of the Year Award 2011.

In the 2019–20 Danish Cup, Skive experiences a very adventurous tournament that started in the first round away against Lystrup IF, a match which Skive won with the record score 16–1. The match reached national media even before being played, due to Lystrup first-team players attending Smukfest, an annual music festival, which meant that Lystrup were forced to forfeit their Danish Cup matchup against Skive. After facing pressure from Divisionsforeningen, representing the Danish divisions, and criticism from Skive's director of football, Rasmus Brandhof, Lystrup head coach John Stoltze Madsen stated that he simply did not have enough players available to compete. Club chairman Susanne Pedersen later explained that Smukfest was not the reason for players cancelling the cup match, but that the main reason was the club's relegation from the Denmark Series to the Jutland Series, which had seen many players leave the club during the summer. The following day, Lystrup announced that a mixture of first-team and veteran's team footballers could form a competitive team, which meant that cancellation was avoided. The match was eventually played on 8 August, and ended in a 16–1 win for Skive, tying Brøndby IF's 16–1 win over BK Pioneren in 1982 as the biggest win ever in the Danish Cup. In the second round, Skive drew Middelfart Boldklub away and returned home with a 0–2 win. Skive drew Danish giants Brøndby IF for the third round; a cup rematch as they had lost 0–3 to Brøndby at home a few years earlier. With 3,720 people at the stadium, Skive lost 2–3 in extra time and were knocked out. The top scorer of the 2019–20 edition of the Danish Cup with 7 goals ended up being Skive player Jeppe Mogensen; all goals came in the same match – the 16–1 win over Lystrup.

== Honours ==
=== League ===
- 2nd Division (third tier)
  - Champions: 2018–19

== Players ==
=== First-team squad ===
As of 6 September 2026

Note: Flags indicate national team as defined under FIFA eligibility rules; some limited exceptions apply. Players may hold more than one non-FIFA nationality.

No.	Pos.	Nation	Player
1	GK	DEN	Benjamin Schubert
2	DF	DEN	Daniel Thøgersen
3	DF	DEN	Samuel Juel
4	FW	DEN	Frederik Warrer
5	MF	DEN	Jonathan Otoa (on loan from Lyngby)
6	MF	DEN	Mathias Nedergaard
7	DF	MDA	Christian Tcacenco (on loan from AaB)
8	FW	DEN	Gustav Callø
9	MF	BIH	Daris Catak
10	MF	DEN	Christian Kudsk
11	FW	DEN	Zean Dalügge

No.	Pos.	Nation	Player
12	FW	DEN	Rasmus Breiner
16	FW	DEN	Viktor Hoff
17	MF	DEN	Oliver Amby
18	DF	DEN	Sebastian Madsen
20	FW	DEN	Sebastian Christoffersen
21	DF	DEN	Malthe Bøndergaard
22	DF	DEN	Lukas Wagner
23	MF	DEN	August Bryld
70	FW	DEN	Malthe Larsson
71	GK	DEN	Sebastian Troldtoft
99	GK	DEN	Casper Nygaard

== Club staff ==
As of 1 January 2024

First Team Management
Role	Person
Head coach	(Denmark) Anders Jensen
Assistant	(Denmark) Jonas Grauslund
Goalkeeping coach	(England) Stephen Lowe
Director of sports	(Denmark) Rasmus Brandhof
Physiotherapist	(Denmark) Johnny Landberg
