= Zean Dalügge =

Danish footballer (born 2003)

Personal information
- Full name: Zean Peetz Dalügge
- Date of birth: 11 July 2003 (age 23)
- Place of birth: Tønder, Denmark
- Height: 1.85 m (6 ft 1 in)
- Position: Forward

Team information
- Current team: Skive
- Number: 11

Youth career
- Løgum IF
- –2018: Tønder SF
- 2018–2021: Esbjerg fB

Senior career*
Years	Team	Apps	(Gls)
2020–2021	Esbjerg fB	13	(1)
2022–2023	Lyngby	1	(0)
2022	→ Leiknir Reykjavík (loan)	5	(0)
2023	→ HB Køge (loan)	15	(3)
2023–2025	Vendsyssel	21	(1)
2024	→ B36 Tórshavn (loan)	25	(11)
2025–2026	Trelleborg	13	(4)
2026	Egaleo	6	(0)
2026–	Skive	10	(1)
- * Club domestic league appearances and goals as of 21:00, 3 October 2026 (UTC)

Zean Peetz Dalügge (born 11 July 2003) is a Danish professional footballer who plays as a forward for Danish 2nd Division club Skive.

== Career ==
=== Esbjerg fB ===
Raised in Tønder, Dalügge spent his youth years at Løgum IF and later at Tønder SF, before joining Esbjerg fB in November 2018 at the age of 15.

In August 2020, Dalügge signed a new deal with Esbjerg until June 2023. A few days after the contract extension, on 2 September 2020, 17-year old Dalügge got his official debut for Esbjerg in a Danish Cup game against Glamsbjerg IF. Later that month, Dalügge also made his debut in the Danish 1st Division, finishing the season with 13 league appearances for Esbjerg and scoring one goal.

After a lot of turmoil with Esbjerg's controversial coach Peter Hyballa, Dalügge was one of several players the coach sent down to the club's U-19 team in July 2023. A month later, it was confirmed that the parties had agreed to end the collaboration. Zean Dalügge reached 16 first team matches for Esbjerg.

=== Lyngby ===
After leaving Esbjerg, Dalügge was reportedly close to a move to Italian Genoa, but reportedly failed the medical. 18-year old Dalügge was then without a club until the end of January 2022, where he signed with Lyngby until June 2023.

In his first six months in Lyngby, Dalügge played for the club's U-19 team and in June 2022, he signed a contract extension until June 2024. At the end of July 2023, he was then loaned to Icelandic club Leiknir Reykjavík for the rest of the year, where he also scored in his debut for the club. He returned to Lyngby in November 2022, but in January 2023 he was again loaned out, this time to Danish 1st Division club HB Køge, for the rest of the season.

After returning from his latest loan spell, Dalügge finally got his debut for Lyngby in the Danish Superliga in a game against F.C. Copenhagen on 22 July 2023. However, this also turned out to be his last appearance for Lyngby.

=== Vendsyssel FF ===
On 31 August 2023 it was confirmed, that Dalügge had been sold to Danish 1st Division club Vendsyssel FF, signing a deal until June 2026.

Due to lack of playing time, Dalügge was - at the end of February 2024 - loaned out to B36 Tórshavn in the Faroe Islands until the end of the year.

=== Trelleborgs FF ===
On 4 July 2025, Dalügge moved to Swedish Superettan club Trelleborgs FF, signing a deal until the end of 2028.

=== Egaleo ===
On 8 February 2026, Super League Greece 2 club Egaleo announced the signing of Dalügge.

=== Skive ===
On 20 July 2026, he signed a two-year contract with Danish 2nd Division club Skive IK.
