= Lundrim Hetemi =

Albanian footballer (born 2000)

Personal information
- Date of birth: 18 February 2000 (age 26)
- Place of birth: Fredericia, Denmark
- Height: 1.70 m (5 ft 7 in)
- Position: Midfielder

Team information
- Current team: Vejle
- Number: 34

Youth career
- Fredericia
- 2015–2017: Vejle

Senior career*
Years	Team	Apps	(Gls)
2017–	Vejle	97	(1)
2023–2024	→ Fredericia (loan)	24	(2)

International career
2019	Albania U20	3	(0)
- * Club domestic league appearances and goals as of 10:04, 24 October 2026 (UTC)

Lundrim Hetemi (born 18 February 2000) is a professional footballer who plays as a midfielder for Danish 1st Division club Vejle Boldklub. Born in Denmark, he has represented Albania internationally.

== Professional career ==
A youth product of his hometown club Fredericia, Hetemi joined the youth academy of Vejle in 2018. He signed his first professional contract with the club on 3 June 2019. Hetemi made his professional debut with Vejle in a 4–2 Danish Superliga win loss to AGF on 14 September 2020.

On 31 August 2023, Hetemi moved to FC Fredericia on a loan deal for the rest of 2023. On 30 January 2024, the loan deal was extended until the end of the season. In the summer of 2024, Hetemi was back in Vejle.

== International career ==
Born in Denmark, Hetemi is of Kosovo Albanian descent. He is a youth international for Albania.

== Honours ==
Vejle

- Danish 1st Division: 2017–18, 2019–20, 2022–23
