= Anders Dahl (footballer) =

Danish footballer (born 2002)

- Dahl in 2026

Personal information
- Full name: Anders Dahl
- Date of birth: 1 May 2002 (age 24)
- Place of birth: Ringkøbing, Denmark
- Height: 1.76 m (5 ft 9 in)
- Position: Right-back

Team information
- Current team: Fredericia
- Number: 14

Youth career
- –2017: Ringkøbing
- 2017–2022: Silkeborg

Senior career*
Years	Team	Apps	(Gls)
2020–2025	Silkeborg	6	(0)
2024	→ Fredericia (loan)	28	(1)
2025–	Fredericia	34	(1)

International career
2017–2018	Denmark U-16	7	(0)
2019–2020	Denmark U-18	5	(0)
- * Club domestic league appearances and goals as of 19 May 2026

Anders Dahl (born 1 May 2002) is a Danish footballer who plays as a right-back for Danish Superliga club FC Fredericia.

== Career ==
=== Silkeborg ===
Born and raised in Ringkøbing, Dahl started his career at local club Ringkøbing IF, before joining Silkeborg IF at the age of 15 in the summer 2017.

In the winter of 2020, 17-year old Dahl was selected for Silkeborg's professional squad to attend a training camp in Spain, and in connection with the corona crisis, he, along with Anders Sønderby and Oscar Fuglsang, was moved up to the training environment around the first team and trained with the squad for most of the spring and summer.

In July 2020, Dahl signed a new two-year deal. His debut for Silkeborg happened on 3 September 2020 against St. Restrup IF in the Danish Cup, where he was given 15 minutes on the pitch. His debut in the Danish 1st Division occurred in the same month, on 27 September 2020, against FC Fredericia in the Danish 1st Division, when he replaced Anders Klynge for the last 10 minutes. He made a total of three appearances in that 2020–21 season and also signed a new four-year deal with Silkeborg in at the end of February 2021.

Silkeborg was promoted to the Danish Superliga for the 2021–22 season, but Dahl was yet to make his debut in the Danish top tier in that season. However, he signed a His debut in the Superliga came in the 2022–23 season, on 23 October 2022, against AC Horsens.

=== Fredericia ===
In pursuit of more playing time, on 31 January 2024, Dahl was loaned to Danish 1st Division club Fredericia until the end of the year. Towards the end of the year, there were negotiations between the clubs, as Fredericia wanted to keep Dahl.

After Dahl's loan at Fredericia expired at the end of 2024, on 13 January 2025, the club signed him on a permanent deal until the summer of 2027.

== Career statistics ==
=== Club ===
As of match played 30 November 2024

Club	Season	League			Danish Cup		Continental		Other		Total	
Club	Season	Division	Apps	Goals	Apps	Goals	Apps	Goals	Apps	Goals	Apps	Goals
Silkeborg	2020–21	Danish 1st Division	2	0	0	0	—		—		2	0
Silkeborg	2021–22	Danish Superliga	0	0	0	0	—		—		0	0
Silkeborg	2022–23	Danish Superliga	3	0	3	1	2 (Note: Appearance(s) in UEFA Europa Conference League)	0	—		8	1
Silkeborg	2023–24	Danish Superliga	1	0	2	0	—		—		3	0
Silkeborg	Total		6	0	5	1	2	0	0	0	13	1
Fredericia (loan)	2023–24	Danish 1st Division	14	1	1	0	—		—		15	1
Fredericia (loan)	2024–25	Danish 1st Division	18	0	3	0	—		—		21	0
Fredericia	2024–25	Danish 1st Division	0	0	0	0	—		—		0	0
Fredericia	Total		32	1	4	0	0	0	0	0	36	1
Career total			38	1	9	1	2	0	0	0	49	1
