= Vejlby-Risskov Hallen =

Indoor arena in Aarhus, Denmark

Coordinates: 56.1924°N 10.2103°E

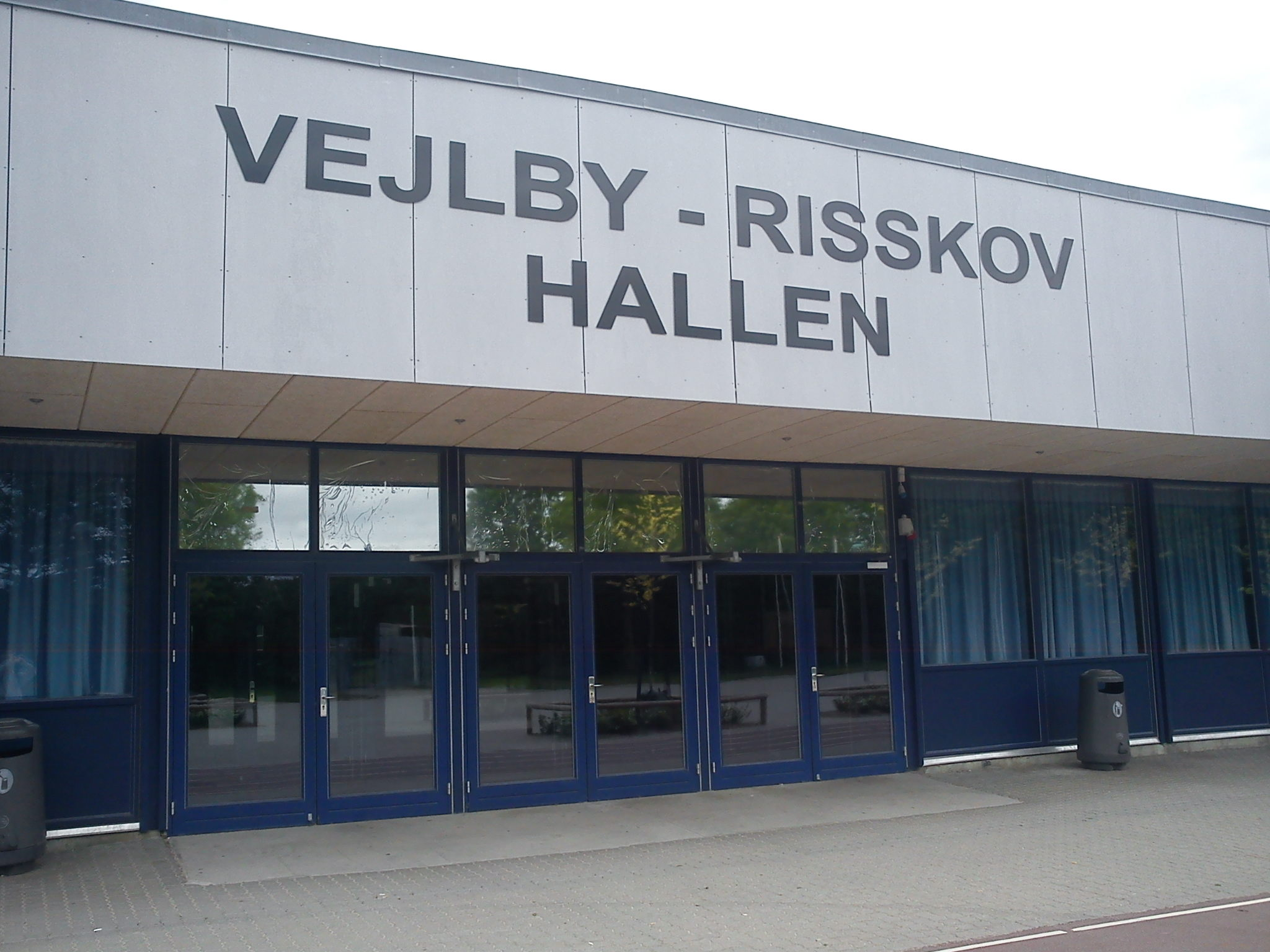
Vejlby-Risskov Hallen, entrance.

Vejlby-Risskov Hallen is an indoor arena located in Aarhus, Denmark. It was inaugurated in 1969 and has a capacity for 1,900 spectators. The building is part of the large sports complex of Vejlby-Risskov Idrætscenter, comprising several other sports halls and facilities.

Vejlby-Risskov Hallen is home to the handball club SK Aarhus and the basketball Club Bakken Bears.

In addition to sports events and daily training, Vejlby-Risskov Hallen is occasionally used as a music and event venue. In the 1970s and 1980s many notable artists performed at the arena, including Jimi Hendrix, The Who, The Rolling Stones, Kiss, Pink Floyd, Deep Purple and Rainbow.
