= Lukas Wagner =

Danish footballer (born 2004)

Personal information
- Full name: Lukas Wagner
- Date of birth: 19 November 2004 (age 21)
- Place of birth: Denmark
- Position: Centre-back

Team information
- Current team: Skive
- Number: 22

Youth career
- Hatting/Torsted
- Horsens

Senior career*
| Years | Team | Apps | (Gls) |
| 2021–2024 | Horsens | 1 | (0) |
| 2024–2025 | Aarhus Fremad | 21 | (0) |
| 2025– | Skive | 50 | (2) |

International career
| 2021–2022 | Denmark U18 | 4 | (0) |
| 2023 | Denmark U19 | 1 | (0) |
- * Club domestic league appearances and goals as of 21:00, 3 October 2026 (UTC)

Lukas Wagner (born 19 November 2004) is a Danish footballer who plays as a centre-back for Danish 2nd Division club Skive IK.

== Career ==
=== Horsens ===
Wagner joined AC Horsens from Hatting/Torsted IF as a U-13 player. Already at the age of 15, Wagner made his unofficial debut for Horsens' first team in a friendly game against AaB in September 2020. At the age of 16, Wagner was promoted to the U-19 squad, where he became a regular starter for the team. He also continued to train with the first team squad during the second half of 2020–21 season.

16-year old Wagner got his official debut for Horsens on 24 May 2021 in a Danish Superliga game against OB. Wagner started on the bench, before replacing Bjarke Jacobsen for the last few minutes. This was his only first team appearance in the 2020–21 season.

In the 2021–22 season, Wagner continued to play for the U19s. However, he made two appearances for the first team in the first half of the season, both in the Danish Cup. In July 2023, Wagner was permanently promoted to the first team squad.

=== Later clubs ===
On 30 January 2024, Wagner moved to Danish 2nd Division club Aarhus Fremad. On February 3, 2025, Wagner transferred to fellow league club Skive IK, where he signed a contract lasting until June 2026.
