= Emmanuel Ogura =

Ghanaian professional footballer

Personal information
- Date of birth: 13 May 2002 (age 24)
- Height: 1.82 m (6 ft 0 in)
- Position: Goalkeeper

Team information
- Current team: Randers
- Number: 22

Youth career
- Right to Dream

Senior career*
Years	Team	Apps	(Gls)
2021–2024	Nordsjælland	7	(0)
2023	→ HIK (loan)	12	(0)
2023–	→ HIK (loan)	7	(0)
2024–	Randers	0	(0)
- * Club domestic league appearances and goals as of 16:19, 1 January 2024 (UTC)

Emmanuel Ogura (born 13 May 2002) is a Ghanaian professional footballer who plays as a goalkeeper for Randers FC.

== Career ==
Ogura started his career with Right to Dream Academy before joining FC Nordsjælland. He made his debut on 28 September 2021 in a 5–1 loss to FC Copenhagen.

On 18 January 2024, Ogura joined Danish Superliga side Randers FC on a 1,5-year deal.
