= Mads Hansen (footballer, born 2001) =

Danish footballer

Personal information
- Full name: Mads Hjalmar Hansen
- Date of birth: 10 April 2001 (age 25)
- Place of birth: Haderslev, Denmark
- Height: 1.74 m (5 ft 9 in)
- Position: Midfielder

Team information
- Current team: VSK Aarhus
- Number: 20

Youth career
- SønderjyskE

Senior career*
Years	Team	Apps	(Gls)
2019–2024	SønderjyskE	15	(0)
2022	→ Kolding (loan)	0	(0)
2024	→ Middelfart (loan)	7	(0)
2024–2026	Middelfart	35	(3)
2026–	VSK Aarhus	2	(0)

International career
2019	Denmark U19	2	(0)
- * Club domestic league appearances and goals as of 3 October 2026

Mads Hjalmar Hansen (born 10 April 2001) is a Danish footballer who plays as a midfielder for Danish 2nd Division side VSK Aarhus.

== Career ==
=== SønderjyskE ===
Hansen is a product of SønderjyskE and has played his entire youth career for the club. In the winter 2019, Hansen played several friendly games for the first team and was also training with them once in a while. On his 18th birthday, 10 April 2019, Hansen signed a five-year contract with the club. This was the first time in the club's history, that they had signed a five-year contract with a youth player.

He got his official debut for the club on 5 September 2019 in a 5-0 Danish Cup victory against BK Viktoria. Hansen played the whole game and was also noticed for an assist. His debut in the Danish Superliga came on 6 October 2019 against Esbjerg fB. Hansen came on the pitch with a few minutes left with shirt number 23, replacing Johan Absalonsen in a 2–1 victory.

On 1 February 2022, Hansen was loaned out to Danish 2nd Division club Kolding IF for the rest of the season, to gain some experience. In the 2022–23 season, when Hansen was back at Sønderjyske, he spent much of the season in the stands as the young Dane was out with injury. In late December 2023 SønderjyskE confirmed that Hansen was loaned out to Middelfart Boldklub in the Danish 2nd Division until the end of the season, when Hansen's contract with Sønderjyske also expired.

On 30 May 2024, Sønderjyske confirmed that Hansen would leave the club when his contract expired. Hansen managed to represent Sønderjyske 22 times in all competitions.

=== Later career ===
On 31 August 2024 Middelfart confirmed that Hansen had returned and had signed with the club.

== Personal life ==
Hansen's father, Rasmus, also played football for Haderslev FK. His sister is pop singer Mumle.
