= List of Danmarksturneringen i fodbold clubs =

The Danmarksturneringen i fodbold (shortened to Herre-DM, or simply DM) is a men's association football league tournament in Denmark, comprising the top four nation-wide professional divisions of the Danish football league system. The national league system was established by the Danish FA in 1927, following the discontinuation of the Landsfodboldturneringen knock-out tournament after 15 editions (1913–1927). The first season, 1927–28 Danmarksmesterskabsturneringen, involved twenty teams — that had qualified through the regional football league championships — divided equally into five groups with the five best teams progressing to a final group phase. Following a second season of this two stage format, a two league format was introduced, where ten and seven teams respectively played an opponent once each in two separate divisions. Continuous evolutions to the league format occurred in the seasons that followed. A third division was introduced in 1936, and a fourth division was implemented in 1959, abolished in 1966 and later reintroduced. Initially formed as an amateur league, professionalism was legalized and restricted to the Danmarksturneringen in 1978. The tournament was organized by the Danish FA until the early 1980s, when the administration of the Danmarksturneringen was handed over to the Divisionsforeningen. The task was returned to the Danish FA in the summer of 1996, until the Divisionsforeningen became the organizing body again in July 2013. The clubs finishing bottom of the Danmarksturneringen's basement division have since the 1966-season been relegated to the Danmarksserien, the highest level of amateur football in the country.

The list includes clubs that are current members of the Danmarksturneringen, those who lost their Danmarksturneringen status upon relegation, and those which lost their status by other means. This includes clubs which have become defunct, merged or created superstructures with one or several neighbouring clubs, or have been relegated to a lower non-league position in the national league pyramid. Where a defunct club has been succeeded by a phoenix club, the new club is listed. If a club now only fields youth teams and no senior men's teams, the club's senior men's department is listed as inactive.

== Member clubs ==
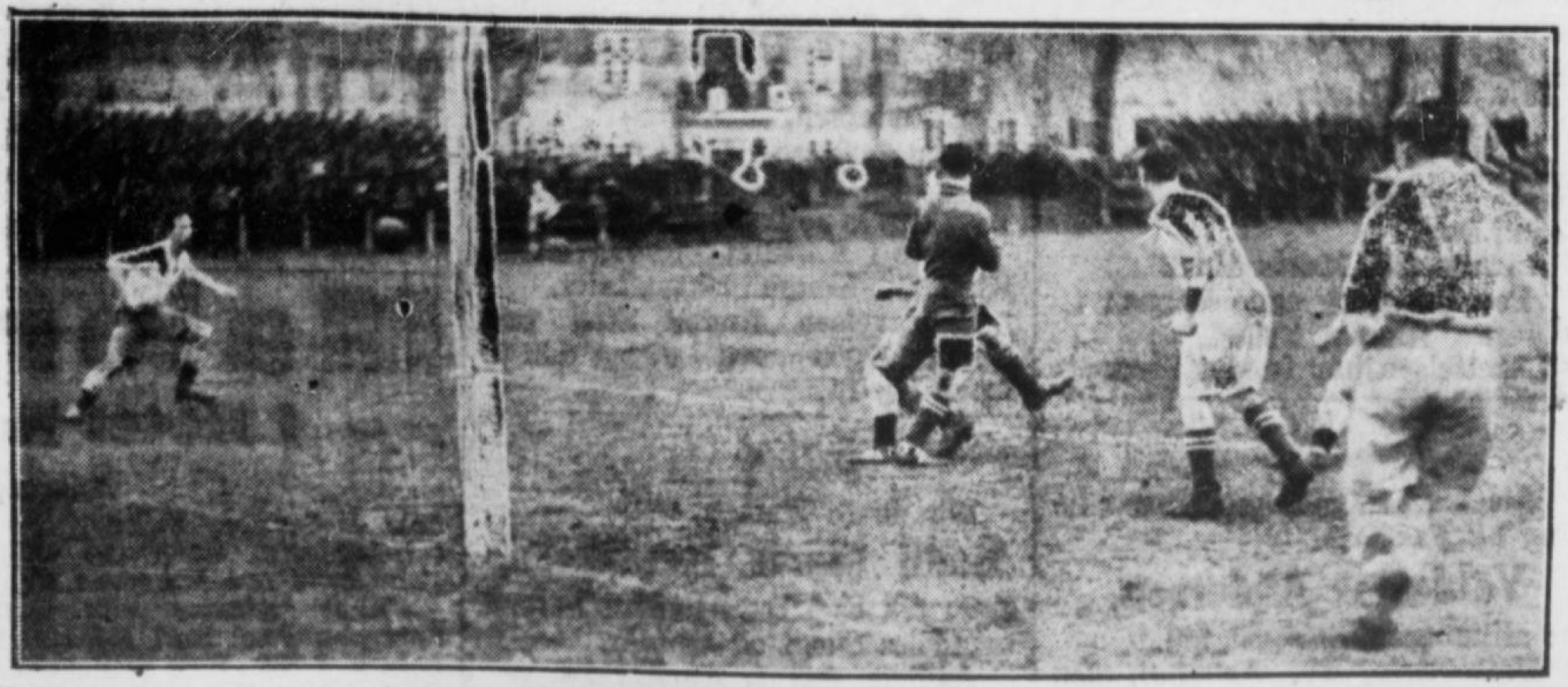
The first Danmarksturneringen match between Aarhus GF and Akademisk BK took place on 1 April 1928.

The table shows the first and last seasons in which each club competed in a division part of the Danmarksturneringen including the total number of Herre-DM seasons and a summary of the seasons spent in the top flight division. Some clubs' membership was intermittent between their first and last seasons. The current name of the club's senior men's squad and/or professional branch is listed even though the name might differ from the actual period in which the team took part in the Danmarksturneringen – the footnotes detail relevant changes in the club's history. Their affiliation to a regional football association and current division status is also mentioned, highlighting whether the individual clubs are participating in the current season of the Danmarksturneringen, playing at a lower ranking non-league level, have transformed to become a reserve team, or have become defunct or inactive due to a merger, superstructure at senior level or were dissolved.

As of the 2021–22 season, a total of 198 different teams have competed in the Danmarksturneringen since its inception, including nineteen (professional) superstructures involving multiple clubs, forty-five now defunct or inactive senior men's teams and eleven reserve squads. In the spring of 1992, FC Fredericia (Note: In 1991, FC Fredericia was originally founded as a professional superstructure by Fredericia KFUM and Fredericia fF. In 2002, Fredericia fF discontinued their engagement and FC Fredericia then became the professional branch of Fredericia KFUM.) became the first superstructure to partake in the Danmarksturneringen. Following the formation of FC Midtjylland in July 1999, the second highest placed founding club, BK Herning Fremad, became the first reserve team to play in the Danmarksturneringen, which was followed up by an additional ten reserve teams between 2005 and 2010, in a period where reserve teams were allowed to play at the third level. Aarhus GF and AB Gladsaxe remain the only clubs to have played in all seasons of the Danmarksturneringen, while three teams, namely BK Herning Fremad (FCM reserves), Humlebæk BK and Virum-Sorgenfri BK have only played a half season each due to the former format of the fourth tier (then known as Kvalifikationsrækken). Svaneke BK were engaged in two league matches in the 1939–40 season, before the Danish FA — after consulting with the club — pulled the first team from the league, resulting in their league records being expunged. Sixty-five different teams have participated in the top flight league, with Aarhus GF being the club with the most seasons (84). Svendborg fB have had the most league seasons in the Danmarksturneringen without ever having played in the top division. Being the largest regional football association, the Jutland FA have had the highest number of member clubs complete in the Danmarksturneringen.

Overview has been updated to include the 2021–22 season. A season is regarded as one year long.

Club	Total DM seasons	Top tier seasons	First season	Last season	2021–22 division	Regional FA affiliation	Ref(s)
AB 1970 (Note: Founded in January 2009, AB Tårnby is a merger between Tårnby BK and AB 1970. The founding clubs ceased to exist as entities.)	3	—	2005–06	2007–08	Defunct	Copenhagen	
AB Gladsaxe (Note: Founded in February 1889 as Akademisk BK, the club merged with Bagsværd IF in January 1962 as part of their relocation from Copenhagen to Gladsaxe, continuing under the name Akademisk BK and with a slight change to their logo. In September 2012, Akademisk BK changed its name to AB Gladsaxe.)	95	51	1927–28	—	2. division	Copenhagen (1927–1961); Zealand (1962–present)	
AB Tårnby	2	—	2015–16	2020–21	Danmarksserien	Copenhagen	
Allerød FK (Note: Founded in July 1927 as Lillerød IF, the club changed its name to Allerød FK in January 2004.)	2.5	—	1995–96	2010–11	Danmarksserien	Zealand	
FC Amager (Note: FC Amager was a professional superstructure, formed by BK Fremad Amager, Kastrup BK, Dragør BK and Kløvermarkens FB, becoming the parent clubs' joint first team between July 2008 and March 2009. The founding clubs played with status as reserve teams at a lower ranking amateur league level.)	1	—	2008–09	2008–09	Defunct	Copenhagen	
Assens FC (Note: The football department of Assens G&IK was refounded as a separate association football club named Assens FC in December 1970.)	2	—	1964	1966	DBU Fyns Serie 2	Funen	
Asaa BK	2	—	1989	1990	DBU Jyllands Serie 4	Jutland	
IF AIA (Note: Founded in August 1918 as Arbejdernes Idrætsklub Aarhus (known as AIA), the club changed its name to Idrætsforeningen AIA Aarhus in June 1967. In June 1974, the club merged with Tranbjerg IF to form IF AIA-Tranbjerg. The football departments of the founding clubs ceased to exist as entities.)	28	6	1931–32	1970	Defunct	Jutland	
IF AIA-Tranbjerg	2	—	1976	1977	DBU Jyllands Serie 1	Jutland	
Albertslund IF (Note: BK Glostrup Albertslund was a superstructure, formed by Glostrup FK and Albertslund IF, becoming the parent clubs' joint first team between July 2009 and June 2015. The founding clubs played with status as reserve teams at a lower ranking amateur league level.)	3	—	1987	1989	Sjællandsserien	Zealand	
Avedøre IF	1	—	2014–15	2014–15	Sjællandsserien	Zealand	
B.93	94	41	1927–28	—	2. division	Copenhagen	
B 1901 (Note: In 1994, Nykøbing Falster Alliancen was originally founded as a professional superstructure by B 1901 and B 1921, becoming the parent clubs' joint first team. In 2006, its name was changed to Lolland-Falster Alliancen. In 2010, B 1901 discontinued their engagement and Lolland-Falster Alliancen continued as the professional branch of B 1921.) (Note: Founded in 2013, Nykøbing FC is a merger between B 1901 and B 1921. The founding clubs ceased to exist as separate entities.)	61	25	1927–28	1990	Defunct	Lolland-Falster	
B 1903 (Note: FC Copenhagen is a professional superstructure formed in 1992 by Kjøbenhavns BK and B 1903, becoming the parent clubs' joint first team. The founding clubs play with status as reserve teams at a lower ranking amateur league level.)	65	62	1927–28	1991–92	Danmarksserien (as FCK reserves)	Copenhagen	
B 1908	27	4	1932–33	2015–16	Danmarksserien	Copenhagen	
B 1909 (Note: FC Fyn was a professional superstructure, formed by B 1909, B 1913 and Dalum IF, becoming the parent clubs' joint first team between 2006 and 2013. The founding clubs played with status as reserve teams at a lower ranking amateur league level.)	77	32.5	1927–28	2005–06	Danmarksserien	Funen	
B 1910 (Note: Founded in 1956, Rønne IK is a merger between B 1910 and Rønne BK. The founding clubs ceased to exist as entities.)	4	—	1934–35	1946–47	Defunct	Bornholm	
B 1913	75	18	1927–28	2005–06	Danmarksserien	Funen	
B 1921	13	—	1933–34	1988	Defunct	Lolland-Falster	
BK Avarta	33.5	—	1980	2020–21	Danmarksserien	Zealand	
AC Ballerup (Note: AC Ballerup was a superstructure, formed by Ballerup IF, Grantoftens IF, Ballerup FC Lundegården and Lille Hema af 1973, becoming the parent clubs' joint first team between 1996 and 2002. The founding clubs played with status as reserve teams at a lower ranking amateur league level.)	1.5	—	1998–99	1999–2000	Defunct	Zealand	
Ballerup IF (Note: Founded in 2010, Ballerup-Skovlunde Fodbold (known as BSF) is a merger between Ballerup IF and Skovlunde IF. The founding clubs ceased to exist as entities.)	7	—	1974	1990	Defunct	Zealand	
Ballerup Skovlunde Fodbold	1	—	2010–11	2010–11	Sjællandsserien	Zealand	
BK Borup (Note: Founded in 1911, BK Borup was dissolved in the 1980s, playing the 1985 season as their last in a league governed by the DBU Copenhagen.)	1	—	1933–34	1933–34	Defunct	Copenhagen	
Brabrand IF	19	—	2003–04	—	2. division	Jutland	
Bramming BK	1	—	1989	1989	Jyllandsserien	Jutland	
Brande IF	11	—	1952–53	1989	DBU Jyllands Serie 2	Jutland	
Brøndby IF	48	41	1975	—	Superligaen	Zealand	
Brøndby IF (2)	5	—	2005–06	2009–10	Reserveligaen (as BIF reserves)	Zealand	
Brønderslev IF	1	—	1964	1964	DBU Jyllands Serie 1	Jutland	
Brønshøj BK	77	14	1944–45	2020–21	Danmarksserien	Zealand	
BK Dalgas (Note: Founded in 2000, Frederiksberg Alliancen 2000 is a merger between BK Dalgas, B 1972 and Frederiksberg Kammeraternes IF. The founding clubs ceased to exist as entities.)	2	—	1964	1973	Defunct	Copenhagen	
Dalum IF	15.5	—	1997–98	—	3. division	Funen	
FC Djursland (Note: Founded in 2009, FC Djursland was originally a superstructure, formed by Grenaa IF Fodbold, Østdjurs 91, AC Norddjurs, Åstrup/Hammelev IF and Kolind Pederstrup IF, becoming the parent clubs' joint first team. In 2014, Kolind Pederstrup IF left the agreement at senior level, and in 2015, Åstrup/Hammelev IF followed suit. In 2018, FC Djursland became the elite branch of Grenaa IF Fodbold.)	2	—	2010–11	2013–14	Jyllandsserien	Jutland	
Dragør BK	16	4	1939–40	1996–97	Københavnsserien	Copenhagen	
SC Egedal (Note: SC Egedal was a professional superstructure, formed by Ølstykke FC and Stenløse BK, becoming the parent clubs' joint first team between 2011 and 2015. The founding clubs played with status as reserve teams at a lower ranking amateur league level.)	2	—	2011–12	2013–14	Defunct	Zealand	
Esbjerg B 47 (Note: Founded in 1992, Esbjerg IF 92 is a merger between Esbjerg B 47 and Østerbyen BK. The founding clubs ceased to exist as entities.)	2	—	1968	1976	Defunct	Jutland	
Esbjerg fB	93	61	1928–29	—	1. division	Jutland	
Esbjerg fB (2)	5	—	2005–06	2009–10	Reserveligaen (as EfB reserves)	Jutland	
Fredensborg BK&IF	1	—	2016–17	2016–17	Sjællandsserien	Zealand	
Fredericia BK (Note: Founded in 1953, Fredericia fF is a merger between Fredericia BK and ØB Fredericia. The founding clubs ceased to exist as entities.)	7	2	1927–28	1937–38	Defunct	Jutland	
FC Fredericia	30.5	—	1991–92	—	1. division	Jutland	
Fredericia KFUM	4	—	1987	1990	DBU Jyllands Serie 2 (as FCF reserves)	Jutland	
Frederiksberg Alliancen 2000	3	—	2019–20	—	2. division	Copenhagen	
Frederiksberg BK	11	—	1959	1977	Københavnsserien	Copenhagen	
Frederiksborg IF	3	1	1928–29	1930–31	DBU Sjællands Serie 4	Zealand	
Frederikshavn fI (Note: Founded as Hjørring IF, the club's professional section changed its name to FC Hjørring in 2006. In 2013, Vendsyssel FF was originally formed as a professional superstructure by FC Hjørring and Frederikshavn fI. The following year, in 2014, Frederikshavn fI discontinued their engagement at senior level.)	32.5	5	1956–57	2000–01	Jyllandsserien	Jutland	
Frederikssund IK	1	—	2010–11	2010–11	Danmarksserien	Zealand	
IK Freja Aalborg	10	1	1928–29	1980	DBU Jyllands Serie 1	Jutland	
BK Frem	92	58.5	1927–28	—	3. division	Copenhagen	
BK Frem Sakskøbing	15	2	1927–28	1969	Lolland-Falsterserien	Lolland-Falster	
BK Fremad Amager	92	19.5	1927–28	—	1. division	Copenhagen	
BK Fremad Valby	10	—	1979	1990	Københavnsserien	Copenhagen	
IF Fuglebakken (Note: Founded in 1973, IF Hasle Fuglebakken is a merger between IF Fuglebakken and Hasle BK. In 2008, the club merged with KFUMs Boldklub Aarhus to create Fuglebakken KFUM Århus. In each case, the founding clubs ceased to exist as entities.)	10	—	1964	1973	Defunct	Jutland	
FC Fyn	7	—	2006–07	2012–13	Defunct	Funen	
Gentofte-Vangede IF	3	—	1936–37	2014–15	Danmarksserien	Zealand (1927–1944); Copenhagen (1944–present)	
Gladsaxe BK (Note: Founded in 1979, Gladsaxe-Hero BK is a merger between BK Hero and Gladsaxe BK. The founding clubs ceased to exist as entities.)	1	—	1968	1968	Defunct	Zealand	
Gladsaxe-Hero BK	5	—	1980	1988	Sjællandsserien	Zealand	
BK Glostrup Albertslund	3	—	2009–10	2011–12	Defunct	Zealand	
IF 32 Glostrup (Note: Founded in 2003, Glostrup FK is a merger between IF 32 Glostrup Fodbold, Glostrup IC Fodbold and Hvissinge FC. The football departments of the founding clubs ceased to exist as entities.)	15	—	1972	1999–2000	Defunct	Zealand	
Glostrup FK	9	—	2000–01	2008–09	Sjællandsserien	Zealand	
Glostrup IC	17	—	1973	1990	Defunct	Zealand	
Greve Fodbold (Note: Founded in 1935 as Greve IF Fodbold, the football department was reorganised as a separate club in 2004 under the name Greve Fodbold.)	16.5	—	1984	2017–18	Danmarksserien	Zealand	
Handelsstandens BK	1	1	1927–28	1927–28	Københavnsserien	Copenhagen	
IF Hasle Fuglebakken	7	—	1974	1980	Defunct	Jutland	
Haslev FC (Note: Founded in 1902 as Haslev Boldklub, the football department changed its name to Boldklubben Skjold Haslev shortly hereafter, before the club was renamed to Haslev Idræts Klub in 1906, and ultimately refounded as Haslev Idræts Forening in 1918. The sports club's football department was refounded as a separate association football club named Haslev Fodbold Club in 1972.)	5	4	1927–28	1944–45	Sjællandsserien	Zealand	
HB Køge (Note: HB Køge is a professional superstructure formed in 2009 by Herfølge BK and Køge BK, becoming the parent clubs' joint first team. The founding clubs play with status as reserve teams at a lower ranking amateur league level.)	13	2	2009–10	—	1. division	Zealand	
FC Helsingør (Note: Elite 3000 Fodbold is a professional superstructure formed in 2005 by Helsingør IF, Helsingør FC, IF Frem Hellebæk, Vapnagaard FK72 and Snekkersten IF, becoming the parent clubs' joint first team. The founding clubs play with status as reserve teams at a lower ranking amateur league level. In 2012, the superstructure changed its name to FC Helsingør.)	12	1	2010–11	—	1. division	Zealand	
Helsingør IF	64	8	1931–32	1999–2000	DBU Sjællands Serie 4 (as FCH reserves)	Zealand	
BK Herning Fremad (Note: FC Midtjylland is a professional superstructure founded in July 1999 by BK Herning Fremad and originally Ikast FS, becoming the parent clubs' joint first team. In July 2018, Ikast FC would technically replace Ikast FS as parent club. The parent clubs play with status as reserve teams at a lower-ranking amateur league level.)	37	2	1950–51	1998–99	Transformation to FCM 2	Jutland	
BK Herning Fremad (FCM 2)	0.5	—	1999–2000	1999–2000	Jyllandsserien (as FCM reserves)	Jutland	
BK Hero	12	—	1962	1978	Defunct	Copenhagen	
Hellerup IK	88	10	1928–29	—	2. division	Copenhagen	
Herfølge BK	40	16	1970	2008–09	Sjællandsserien (as HBK reserves)	Zealand	
Herlev IF	8	—	1992–93	—	3. division	Zealand	
Hillerød Fodbold	5	—	2017–18	—	2. division	Zealand	
Hobro IK	17	5	2005–06	—	1. division	Jutland	
Holbæk B&IF (Note: Between 2008 and 2014, Holbæk B&IF's professional section was named Nordvest FC.)	49.5	4	1937–38	2020–21	Danmarksserien	Zealand	
Holstebro BK	37	—	1934–35	2020–21	Danmarksserien	Jutland	
Holte IF (Note: Founded in 1966, Søllerød BK is a merger between the football departments of Holte IF and Søllerød-Nærum IK. In 2002, the club merged with Vedbæk BK to create BK Søllerød-Vedbæk. In each case, the founding clubs ceased to exist as entities.)	1	—	1964	1964	Defunct	Zealand	
Horbelev BK (Note: Founded in 1968, Horbelev IF is a merger between Horbelev BK and Horbelev S&GF. The founding clubs ceased to exist as entities.)	2	—	1959	1961	Defunct	Lolland-Falster	
AC Horsens (Note: In 1994, AC Horsens was originally founded as a professional superstructure by Horsens FS, FC Horsens and Stensballe IK. Stensballe IK only had a co-operation at the youth level. After five seasons, FC Horsens discontinued their engagement at senior level and hence AC Horsens continued as the professional branch of Horsens FS.)	28.5	12	1993–94	—	1. division	Jutland	
Horsens FS	54.5	9	1927–28	1993–94	Jyllandsserien (as ACH reserves)	Jutland	
Hvidovre IF	63.5	19	1949–50	—	1. division	Copenhagen	
Humlebæk BK	0.5	—	1999–2000	1999–2000	DBU Sjællands Serie 3	Zealand	
Ikast FS (Note: Founded in July 2018, Ikast FC is a merger at amateur level between Ikast FS and Ikast KFUM. The founding clubs' football departments ceased to exist as separate entities.)	44	16.5	1955–56	1998–99	Defunct	Jutland	
Ikast FS (FCM 2)	4	—	2006–07	2009–10	Reserveligaen (as FCM reserves)	Jutland	
Jammerbugt FC (Note: Founded as Jetsmark IF, the club's professional section changed its name to Blokhus FC in 2008 and then Jammerbugt FC in 2013.)	20	—	2002–03	—	1. division	Jutland	
Jyderup BK (Note: Founded in 1885 as Jyderup SG&IF with association football being admitted in 1910, the sport club's football department was refounded as a separate association football club named Jyderup BK in 1991.)	8	—	1978	1985	DBU Sjællands Serie 4	Zealand	
FC Copenhagen	30	30	1992–93	—	Superligaen	Copenhagen	
Kalundborg GF&BK	10	—	1963	2005–06	DBU Sjællands Serie 3	Zealand	
Karlslunde IF	1	—	2021–22	—	3. division	Zealand	
Kastrup BK (Note: Founded in September 2002, Amager United was a superstructure between Kastrup BK and Tårnby BK. The co-operation was dissolved in June 2007.)	28.5	9	1960	1995–96	Københavnsserien	Copenhagen	
KFUM København	36	6	1930–31	1975	Danmarksserien	Copenhagen	
Kjellerup IF	6	—	2011–12	2018–19	Danmarksserien	Jutland	
Kjøbenhavns BK	64.5	59	1927–28	1991–92	Transformation to FCK 2	Copenhagen	
Kjøbenhavns BK (FCK 2)	5	—	2005–06	2009–10	Reserveligaen (as FCK reserves)	Copenhagen	
Kolding BK (Note: Kolding FC was a professional superstructure, formed by Kolding IF and Kolding BK, becoming the parent clubs' joint first team between 2002 and 2011. The founding clubs played with status as reserve teams at a lower ranking amateur league level.)	1	—	2014–15	2014–15	Jyllandsserien	Jutland	
Kolding FC (Note: Vejle Boldklub Kolding was a professional superstructure, formed by Vejle BK and Kolding FC, becoming the parent clubs' joint first team between 2011 and 2013. The founding clubs played with status as reserve teams at a lower ranking amateur league level.)	10	—	2001–02	2010–11	Defunct	Jutland	
Kolding IF	38.5	2	1960	—	2. division	Jutland	
Korsør BK (Note: Founded in 2008, FC Storebælt is a merger between Korsør BK and Halskov B98. The founding clubs ceased to exist as entities.)	18	8	1927–28	1959	Defunct	Zealand	
Korup IF	3.5	—	1999–2000	2002–03	DBU Fyns Serie 2	Funen	
Køge BK	72	39	1935–36	2008–09	DBU Sjællands Serie 1 (as HBK reserves)	Zealand	
Køge Nord FC (Note: Founded in 1971 as Rishøj IF, the sport club's football department was refounded as a separate association football club named Rishøj BK in 2004. In 2017, the club was renamed Køge Nord FC.)	5	—	2010–11	2014–15	Danmarksserien	Zealand	
Lendemark BK (Note: Founded in 1964, Stege-Lendemark IF is a merger between Lendemark BK and Stege IF. The founding clubs ceased to exist as entities.)	7	—	1954–55	1961	Defunct	Zealand	
Lindholm IF (Note: Founded in 2015, Nørresundby FB is a merger between Nørresundby BK and Lindholm IF. The football departments of the founding clubs ceased to exist as entities.)	2	—	2010–11	2011–12	Defunct	Jutland	
Lolland-Falster Alliancen	14.5	—	1995–96	2012–13	Defunct	Lolland-Falster	
Lyngby BK (Note: Between 1994 and 2001, Lyngby BK's professional section went under the name Lyngby FC.)	63	30	1953–54	—	1. division	Zealand	
IF Lyseng	2	—	2017–18	—	3. division	Jutland	
Maribo BK	1	—	1974	1974	Sjællandsserien	Lolland-Falster	
BK Marienlyst	13	—	1935–36	2018–19	Danmarksserien	Funen	
Middelfart BK (Note: Founded in 1948 as Middelfart G&BK, the club's professional section changed its name to Middelfart Fodbold in 2011. In 2015, the club's professional branch was reorganised under the name Middelfart BK.)	16	—	1960	—	2. division	Funen	
FC Midtjylland	23	22	1999–2000	—	Superligaen	Jutland	
Nakskov BK (Note: Founded in 2015, FC Nakskov is a merger between Nakskov BK and BK Velo Nakskov. The football departments of the founding clubs ceased to exist as entities.)	46	5	1929–30	1985	Defunct	Lolland-Falster	
NB Bornholm (Note: Founded in 1915, Nexø BK went bankrupt in 1990. Shortly hereafter, a phoenix club was set up referred to as Nexø Boldklub af 1990. In 2009, the name of the first team was changed to NB Bornholm.)	3	—	1960	2012–13	Københavnsserien	Bornholm	
FC Nordsjælland (Note: Founded as Farum BK in January 1991, the club's professional branch changed its name to FC Nordsjælland in July 2003.)	24.5	20	1997–98	—	Superligaen	Zealand	
Nyborg G&IF	14	—	1953–54	1974	DBU Fyns Serie 1	Funen	
Nykøbing FC	9	—	2013–14	—	1. division	Lolland-Falster	
Næsby BK	22	—	1984	—	3. division	Funen	
Næstved BK (Note: In 1996, Næstved IF's professional section was founded under the name Næstved BK, while the parent club continued playing at a lower level under its original name.)	85	24.5	1932–33	—	2. division	Zealand	
Nørresundby BK	22	—	1979	2001–02	Defunct	Jutland	
Nørre Aaby IK	6.5	—	1991	1996–97	DBU Fyns Serie 2	Funen	
Odder I&GF	6	—	2013–14	2018–19	Danmarksserien	Jutland	
Odense BK	88	70.5	1927–28	—	Superligaen	Funen	
Odense BK (2)	3	—	2007–08	2009–10	Reserveligaen (as OBK reserves)	Funen	
Odense Kammeraternes SK	13.5	—	1980	1992–93	Danmarksserien	Funen	
Odense KFUM	34	—	1939–40	1990	DBU Fyns Serie 1	Funen	
Otterup B&IK	8	—	1956–57	2012–13	Fynsserien	Funen	
Randers FC (Note: Randers FC is a professional superstructure formed in 2003 by Dronningborg BK, Hornbæk SF, Kristrup BK, Randers SK Freja, Randers KFUM and Vorup Frederiksberg BK, becoming the parent clubs' joint first team. The founding clubs play with status as reserve teams at a lower ranking amateur league level.)	19.5	16	2002–03	—	Superligaen	Jutland	
Randers SK Freja (Note: In the 1990s, Randers SK Freja's professional section went under the name Randers Freja FC.)	63.5	15	1933–34	2002–03	Transformation til RFC 2	Jutland	
Randers SK Freja (RFC 2)	2	—	2008–09	2009–10	Reserveligaen (as RFC reserves)	Jutland	
Ringkøbing IF	6	—	2012–13	2019–20	Danmarksserien	Jutland	
Ringsted IF	4.5	—	1989	1992–93	Danmarksserien	Zealand	
Roskilde BK (Note: FC Roskilde is a professional superstructure founded in 2004 by Roskilde BK, Svogerslev BK and Himmelev-Veddelev BK, becoming the parent clubs' joint first team. The parent clubs play with status as reserve teams at a lower ranking amateur league level.)	33	—	1959	1999–2000	Sjællandsserien (as FCR reserves)	Zealand	
Roskilde KFUM	2	—	2020–21	—	3. division	Zealand	
FC Roskilde	18	—	2004–05	—	3. division	Zealand	
Rødby BK	2	—	1960	1962	Lolland-Falsterserien	Lolland-Falster	
BK Rødovre	11	—	1958	1982	DBU Københavns Serie 1	Copenhagen	
Rønne BK	1	1	1927–28	1927–28	Defunct	Bornholm	
Rønne IK	9	—	1961	1978	Bornholmsserien	Bornholm	
SfB-Oure FA (Note: SfB-Oure FA is a professional superstructure formed in 2018 by Svendborg fB and Oure FA, becoming the parent clubs' joint first team. The founding clubs play with status as reserve teams at a lower ranking amateur league level.)	1	—	2020–21	2020–21	Danmarksserien	Funen	
Silkeborg IF	56	28	1961	—	Superligaen	Jutland	
Silkeborg IF (2)	2	—	2005–06	2006–07	Reserveligaen (as SIF reserves)	Jutland	
Skamby BK (Note: Founded in 2021, Skamby-Hårslev BK is a superstructure, formed by Skamby BK and Hårslev BK, that merged all the parent club's senior men's teams, with no cooperation at youth level.)	1	—	1978	1978	Inactive	Funen	
FC Skanderborg	2	—	2012–13	2013–14	DBU Jyllands Serie 1	Jutland	
Skive IK	30.5	—	1960	—	2. division	Jutland	
BK Skjold	11	—	2001–02	2011–12	Københavnsserien	Copenhagen	
IF Skjold Birkerød	24	—	1946–47	2013–14	Sjællandsserien	Zealand	
IK Skovbakken (Note: FC Aarhus was a professional superstructure, originally formed by Aarhus Fremad and IK Skovbakken, becoming the parent clubs' joint first team in 1999. After six months, IK Skovbakken discontinued their engagement and FC Aarhus continued as the professional branch of Aarhus Fremad until 2004.) (Note: Founded in 2016, VSK Aarhus is a merger between IK Skovbakken and Vejlby IK. The football departments of the founding clubs ceased to exist as entities.)	38	—	1961	2015–16	Defunct	Jutland	
Skovlunde IF	6	—	1983	2008–09	Defunct	Zealand	
Skovshoved IF	43.5	13	1927–28	2020–21	Danmarksserien	Zealand (1927–1929); Copenhagen (1929–present)	
Slagelse BK&IF (Note: Between 2008 and 2015, Slagelse BK&IF's professional section went under the name FC Vestsjælland.)	49	10	1938–39	—	3. division	Zealand	
BK Standard (Note: Founded in 1946, BK Standard Kammeraterne is a merger between BK Standard and Amager Kammeraterne. The founding clubs ceased to exist as entities.)	1	—	1932–33	1932–33	Defunct	Copenhagen	
Stenløse BK	6	—	2005–06	2010–11	DBU Sjællands Serie 1	Zealand	
Stoholm IF	3	—	1967	1969	DBU Jyllands Serie 4	Jutland	
FC Sydvest 05 Tønder (Note: Founded in 2015 as FC Sydvest 05, the club is a superstructure between Ballum IF, Bredebro IF, Løgum IF and Tønder SF. In 2013, an agreement was reached to create an independent club under the name FC Sydvest 05 Tønder.)	8	—	2012–13	2020–21	Danmarksserien	Jutland	
Svaneke BK (Note: Founded in 2008, Svaneke IK is a merger between Svaneke BK and Svaneke Ibsker G&IF. The founding clubs ceased to exist as entities.)	—	—	1939–40	1939–40	Defunct	Bornholm	
Svebølle BK&IF (Note: Founded in 1924, Svebølle BK&IF went bankrupt in 2016. Shortly hereafter, a phoenix club was set up named Svebølle Boldklub 2016, officially known as Svebølle BK&IF 2016.)	4	—	2011–12	2014–15	DBU Sjællands Serie 1	Zealand	
Svendborg BK (Note: Founded in 1961, Svendborg fB is a merger between Svendborg BK and Kammeraternes BK. The founding clubs ceased to exist as separate entities.)	3	—	1959	1961	Defunct	Funen	
Svendborg fB (Note: Between 2008 and 2017, Svendborg fB's professional section went under the name FC Svendborg.)	48	—	1962	2016–17	Fynsserien (as SFB-OFA reserves)	Funen	
BK Søllerød-Vedbæk (Note: Founded in 2002, BK Søllerød-Vedbæk (known as BSV) went bankrupt in 2016. Shortly hereafter, a phoenix club was set up named BSV af 2016. In 2020, the phoenix club merged with Rudersdal BK to form FC Rudersdal with the parent clubs ceasing to exist.)	10	—	2005–06	2014–15	Defunct	Zealand	
SønderjyskE (Note: Founded as Haderslev FK, the club's professional section changed its name to HFK Sønderjylland in 2001. In 2004, the club's first team became the football section of the superstructure SønderjyskE, that was originally formed by Haderslev FK, Vojens Ishockey Klub and TM Tønder.)	33.5	16	1959	—	Superligaen	Jutland	
Tarup-Paarup IF	1	—	2018–19	2018–19	Fynsserien	Funen	
Thisted FC	17	—	2005–06	—	2. division	Jutland	
Tjørring IF	2	—	2009–10	2010–11	Jyllandsserien	Jutland	
Toreby-Grænge BK	2	—	1941–42	1942–43	Lolland-Falsterserien	Lolland-Falster	
Tårnby BK	6.5	—	1986	1999–2000	Defunct	Copenhagen	
Taastrup IK 90 (Note: Taastrup FC was originally a superstructure, formed by the football departments of Taastrup IK 90 and Tåstrup B 70, becoming the parent clubs' joint first team between 2001 and 2005. In 2005, the board of the clubs agreed to a merger between the clubs. Hereafter, the founding clubs ceased to exist as entities.)	7	—	1967	1973	Defunct	Zealand	
Vanløse IF	54	2	1952–53	—	3. division	Copenhagen	
Varde IF (Note: Founded in 1975 as Varde IF, the professional branch changed its name to Varde IF Elite in 2012 and have since then been using a different logo.)	17.5	—	1982	2014–15	Danmarksserien	Jutland	
Vejgaard BK	3	—	2016–17	2019–20	Danmarksserien	Jutland	
BK Velo Nakskov	1	—	1965	1965	Defunct	Lolland-Falster	
Vendsyssel FF	39.5	1	1958	—	1. division	Jutland	
Vejle BK	84	51.5	1931–32	—	Superligaen	Jutland	
Vejle BK (2)	1	—	2006–07	2006–07	Reserveligaen (as VBK reserves)	Jutland	
Vejle BK Kolding	2	—	2011–12	2012–13	Defunct	Jutland	
Vejen SF	30.5	7	1932–33	1999–2000	DBU Jyllands Serie 2	Jutland	
Viborg FF	62	19.5	1927–28	—	Superligaen	Jutland	
Viby IF	1	—	2011–12	2011–12	Jyllandsserien	Jutland	
IK Viking	30	1	1928–29	1989	Bornholmsserien	Bornholm	
BK Viktoria	2	1	1928–29	1931–32	DBU Københavns Serie 1	Copenhagen	
Virum-Sorgenfri BK	0.5	—	1999–2000	1999–2000	DBU Sjællands Serie 2	Zealand	
Vordingborg IF	2	—	1985	1986	Sjællandsserien	Zealand	
Vorup Frederiksberg BK	11.5	—	1962	2000–01	Jyllandsserien (as RFC reserves)	Jutland	
VSK Aarhus	5	—	2016–17	—	3. division	Jutland	
Værløse BK	4	—	2004–05	2008–09	DBU Sjællands Serie 1	Zealand	
Young Boys FD (Note: Founded in 1918 as Silkeborg KFUM, the club's professional section changed its name to Young Boys FD in mid-July 2021.)	1	—	2021–22	—	3. division	Jutland	
Ølstykke FC	20.5	—	1988	2008–09	DBU Sjællands Serie 1	Zealand	
Østerbros BK (Note: Founded in 1998, Østerbro IF is a merger between Østerbros BK and Ryvang FC. The founding clubs ceased to exist as entities.)	18	10	1928–29	1952–53	Defunct	Copenhagen	
Aabenraa BK	17	—	1968	1990	Jyllandsserien	Jutland	
Aalborg BK	94	70	1928–29	—	Superligaen	Jutland	
Aalborg BK (2)	3	—	2007–08	2009–10	Reserveligaen (as AaB reserves)	Jutland	
IK Chang Aalborg (Note: Between 2001 and 2004, IK Chang Aalborg's professional section went under the name FC Nordjylland.)	41.5	3	1931–32	2003–04	Jyllandsserien	Jutland	
Aarhus FC (Note: Aarhus FC was founded in 1929 and dissolved in 1938, when the club became part of the football department of Aarhus Idrætsforening af 1900.)	2	—	1933–34	1934–35	Defunct	Jutland	
Aarhus Fremad (Note: Founded in 1897 as Aarhus Idrætsclub Fremad, the football department was established in 1947 as Aarhus Fremad Fodbold. The professional branch of the club is simply named Aarhus Fremad and have been using a modified logo since the spring of 2016.)	26	2	1995–96	—	2. division	Jutland	
Aarhus GF	95	84	1927–28	—	Superligaen	Jutland	
Aarhus GF (2)	3	—	2007–08	2009–10	Reserveligaen (as AGF reserves)	Jutland	
Aarup BK	2	—	1965	2011–12	DBU Fyns Serie 1	Funen	
