= Bardhec Bytyqi =

Albanian footballer (born 1997)

Personal information
- Full name: Bardhec Ahmet Bytyqi
- Date of birth: 8 January 1997 (age 29)
- Place of birth: Nørresundby, Denmark
- Height: 1.88 m (6 ft 2 in)
- Position: Left midfielder

Youth career
- Nørresundby
- –2005: NUBI
- 2005–2016: AaB

Senior career*
Years	Team	Apps	(Gls)
2016–2019	AaB	1	(0)
2018	→ Skive (loan)	9	(1)
2019	→ Jammerbugt (loan)	14	(1)
2019–2022	Jammerbugt	64	(17)
2022–2024	Esbjerg	47	(1)
2024–2026	Middelfart	37	(5)

International career
2017	Albania U21	3	(1)
- * Club domestic league appearances and goals as of 7 December 2025

Bardhec Ahmet Bytyqi (Albanian pronunciation: [byˈtytʃi]; born 8 January 1997) is a professional footballer who plays as a left midfielder.

In the course of his career, Bytyqi has played professionally for AaB, Skive IK, Jammerbugt FC, and Esbjerg fB. Born in Denmark, he has played for the Albania national U21 team.

== Club career ==
=== Early career ===
Born in Nørresundby, Denmark, to Albanian parents, Bytyqi started playing football with his hometown club Nørresundby, from where he moved to Nr. Uttrup & Bouet Idrætsforening (NUBI), before moving to the youth academy of AaB at age 8. Following impressive performances with under-19 where he scored also 1 goal, in July 2016, he was promoted to the AaB first team alongside six other youth players, including Joakim Mæhle and Magnus Christensen.

=== AaB ===
He made his senior debut for AaB on 7 September 2016 in a local match in the Danish Cup against his hometown club Nørresundby, playing the entire match in a 1–5 away win, assisting Thomas Enevoldsen's 2–0 goal in the first half. Meanwhile, during the 2016–17 season he played 8 matches for the under-19 scoring also 6 goals. On 6 July 2017, it was announced that Bytyqi had signed a two-year contract extension, keeping him in Aalborg until 30 June 2019.

==== Loan to Skive ====
In the 2017–18 season first-half, he was part of the team in 7 league matches and 1 cup match without playing any minute. Bytyqi was sent on a six-month loan to the second-tier 1st Division club Skive IK in January 2018, as Bytyqi had no prospect of first-team in AaB. He managed to make nine appearances and score a goal for Skive in the Danish 2nd Division in the spring of 2018. The one goal came on 17 April against FC Roskilde, described as a "dream goal".

==== Return to AaB ====
He returned to AaB in the summer of 2018 as his loan deal expired. He made his debut in the Danish Superliga on 27 August 2018, when he came on as a substitute in the 87th minute instead of Kristoffer Pallesen in a 0–1 defeat at home to Esbjerg fB. In addition to his Superliga debut, he made only one appearance in the autumn of 2018 on 26 September 2018 in a 0–5 away win over FC Roskilde in the Danish Cup.

=== Jammerbugt ===
Due to lacking prospects of playing time in AaB in the spring of 2019, Bytyqi was loaned out to Jammerbugt FC in the 2nd Division for the rest of the season on 24 January 2019. He managed to score a goal on 13 April 2019 against Kjellerup which served to open the scoring but however wasn't enough as eventually the match was lost away 3–2. When the loan deal expired in the summer of 2019, he left AaB permanently at the end of the season, as his contract terminated.

Bytyqi continued on a permanent contract with Jammerbugt. Bytyqi played 4 matches during the 2019–20 Danish 2nd Divisions. In the next season 2020–21 he managed to score 10 goals in 7 matches in the 2020–21 Danish 2nd Divisions and 2 more goals in 3 cup matches to help his team in getting the promotion to the Danish 1st Division. In June 2021, Bytyqi signed a new one-year deal with Jammerbugt.

In the 2021–22 Danish 1st Division first half, he was an undisputed starter playing 15 consecutive full 90-minutes matches with 2 upcomings being substituted off in the second half and managing 3 goals.

=== Esbjerg ===
He moved to Esbjerg fB on 10 January 2022 for the second part of the season on a deal until the end of 2024, in order to help the team to avoid relegation. He was an unused substitute in the first match in February, but managed to play in all three matches of the March in where Esbjerg failed to score any goal taking only one goalless draw in which Bytyqi managed to play the full 90-minutes. Esbjerg was put in relegation group where played 10 more matches with Bytyqi mostly as a starter, but receiving lack of results collecting only 1 win and 5 draws relegating in the 2nd Division after finishing in the penultimate place of the ranking.

In the 2022–23 Danish 2nd Division he lost his starting place playing often as a substitute.

=== Middelfart ===
On 12 July 2024, ahead of the 2024–25 season, Danish 2nd Division club Middelfart Boldklub confirmed that Bytyqi had joined the club.

On 5 February 2026, Middelfart and Bytyqi mutually agreed to terminate his contract with the club.

== International career ==
Bytyqi was first called up for the Albania national U21 team by just appointed coach Alban Bushi for a gathering in Durrës, Albania from 18 to 25 January 2017. He was recalled two months later in two friendly matches against Moldova on 25 and 27 March 2017. In the second match played at Selman Stërmasi Stadium, Bytyqi scored in the second half of a match that Albania won 2–0 after a goal by Kristal Abazaj in the first half.

=== 2019 UEFA European Under-21 Championship qualification ===
He was later called up for the friendly match against France U21 on 5 June 2017 and the 2019 UEFA European Under-21 Championship qualification Group 2 against Estonia on 12 June. The day before the friendly against France, however, he suffered an injury, causing him to miss both matches. On 22 August 2017 he received Albanian citizenship, thus becoming eligible to play also in the competitive matches. He was called up only in 2 matches of the 2019 UEFA Euro U-21 qualification Group 2 against Iceland on 10 October 2017 and Northern Ireland on 10 November 2017, being an unused substitute against the former and playing last minutes against the later which ended in a 1–1 home draw.

== Career statistics ==
=== Club ===
As of match played 15 June 2024

Appearances and goals by club, season and competition
Club	Season	League			Danish Cup		Other		Total	
Club	Season	Division	Apps	Goals	Apps	Goals	Apps	Goals	Apps	Goals
AaB	2016–17	Danish Superliga	0	0	1	0	—		1	0
AaB	2017–18	Danish Superliga	0	0	0	0	—		0	0
AaB	2018–19	Danish Superliga	1	0	1	0	—		2	0
AaB	Total		1	0	2	0	—		3	0
Skive	2017–18	Danish 1st Division	9	1	—		—		9	1
Jammerbugt	2018–19	Danish 2nd Division	1	1	—		—		1	1
Jammerbugt	2019–20	Danish 2nd Division	4	0	—		—		4	0
Jammerbugt	2020–21	Danish 2nd Division	7	10	3	2	—		10	12
Jammerbugt	2021–22	Danish 1st Division	17	3	2	0	—		19	3
Jammerbugt	Total		29	14	5	2	—		34	16
Esbjerg	2021–22	Danish 1st Division	13	0	—		—		13	0
Esbjerg	2022–23	Danish 2nd Division	10	0	1	0	—		11	0
Esbjerg	2023–24	Danish 2nd Division	24	1	2	1	—		26	2
Esbjerg	Total		47	1	3	1	—		50	2
Career total			86	16	10	3	—		96	19

== Honours ==
Jammerbugt

- Danish 2nd Division: 2020–21

Esbjerg fB

- Danish 2nd Division: 2023–24
