= 1964 Jutland Series =

Jyllandsserien
- Season: 1964
- Dates: 30 March – 8 November 1964 (regular season); 15 November 1964 (league final)
- Champions: Aarhus GF (II) (11th title)
- Promoted: IK Aalborg Freja; Silkeborg IF
- Relegated: Struer IF; AIA (II); Aabyhøj IF Thrott
- Matches: 265
- Top goalscorer: Herluf Bang (28 goals)
- Biggest home win: Vejle BK (reserves) 9–0 Aabyhøj IF Thrott (8 August 1964)
- Biggest away win: Aabyhøj IF Thrott 0–7 Aarhus GF (reserves) (15 August 1964)
- Highest scoring: IK Chang Aalborg 8–3 Holstebro BK (13 September 1964)

The 1964 Jutland Series (Danish: Jyllandsserien 1964) was the 66th edition of the Danish fifth-tier association football division since its establishment in 1902. Governed by the Jutland Football Association (JBU), the season was launched on 30 March 1964, and the last round of regular league matches concluded on 8 November 1964, with the league championship final being played on 15 November 1964. Silkeborg IF, Vorup Frederiksberg BK, Brande IF and Holstebro BK entered as relegated teams from last season's fourth-tier, while Hobro IK, Vejen SF, Viborg FF (reserves) and Aabyhøj IF Thrott entered as promoted teams from the 1963 JBUs Serie 1. Fixtures for the 1964 season were announced on 13 March 1964, 2½ weeks prior the season's start. The league featured reserve teams for higher ranking league clubs, whose players could indiscriminately be used on both the league and reserve teams, after a quarantine period of one match day.

The reserve team of Aarhus GF won the league final, securing their eleventh Jutlandic League Championship title, while IK Aalborg Freja and Silkeborg IF were promoted to the fourth-tier, returning to the nationwide leagues of the Danmarksturneringen after 27 and one year(s) respectively. At the end of the season, the three clubs with the fewest points in the final league standings, Struer IF, AIA (reserves) and Aabyhøj IF Thrott, were relegated to the 1965 JBUs Serie 1. Centerforward Herluf Bang of Silkeborg IF was the league's top scorer, netting 28 goals, corresponding to 43.75 percent of his own team's goals.

== Summary ==
The 1964 season was inaugurated on 30 March, on the 2nd day of Easter, following the announcement of the season's fixtures on 13 March 1964 by the Jutland FA. The first match day saw the postponement of two league matches due to the condition of the field caused by the weather. In the northern group, Vorup Frederiksberg BK opened the season with four victories, having goalkeeper Niels Hougård and the defense not concede any goals until their fifth match against the Aalborg BK's reserve team. Vorup Frederiksberg BK lost their second league match and the top spot in the league standings on 10 May, when they clashed against IK Aalborg Freja. Hobro IK held the top position shortly, but lost it the following match day. IK Freja officially overtook the first place on 20 May, when the Aalborg-based club won an evening game against local rivals IK Chang Aalborg – due to better head-to-head points against Vorup Frederiksberg BK and with one of their league games having been postponed. The club finished the spring season as the only undefeated team in the Jutland Series.

IK Aalborg Freja played a local derby against the reserve team of Aalborg BK in front of 2,000 spectators at their home ground at Vesterkæret (aka Frejaparken), winning the game 2 to 1. The first match day of the fall season experienced the biggest home win of 9–0 take place between Vejle BK (II) versus Aabyhøj IF Thrott on 8 August 1964 at Vejle Stadium, with five goals being scored by forward Helge Jensen.

The majority of players on JBU's selected regional league squad (JBUs udvalgte serieunionshold) played in the Jyllandsserien, while the remaining players came from fourth-tier JBU teams. They were for instance selected to the match against the Zealand FA (SBU) on 7 May 1964.

IK Aalborg Freja had a 19 match-long undefeated run, and their only loss of the league season occurred after they secured the northern league group title on 11 October 1964 against IK Chang Aalborg, while their closest competitor in the group, Vorup Frederiksberg BK, suffering a defeat away against Skive IK. A total of nineteen players was used in the line-ups for the league matches, with the majority of the players being 22–23 years old. The players, that was part of the line-up in the decisive game, that secured the club the promotion spot on ? against ?, featured goalkeeper Jørgen "Nønne" Bach, defenders Mogens Madsen and Per "Nigger" Nielsen, midfielders Ole "Sjulle" Schultz, Erik "Koppi" Juul Christensen and Freddie "Lange Freddy" Jensen, forwards John "Dion" Meyer, Per "Lille-Per" Larsen, Christian Frederiksen, Jens Ole "Sømand" Nielsen and Leif "Lazy" Larsen. Additionally, the following players took part in one or more games throughout the season, Reidar Gundersen, Jørgen Lund Petersen, Laurits Krogh, Ole Olsen, Børge Hasselgren, Hans Jørgen Nielsen, Per Hjørringgård and Jørgen Abildgård. The senior team was coached by Arne Holt, a former footballer with over 400 caps on IK Aalborg Freja's best squad, who resigned after the conclusion of the season. IK Aalborg Freja returned to the Danmarksturneringen i fodbold's league system for the first time since the 1936–37 season.

With the reserve team of Aarhus GF not being eligible for promotion, second-placed Silkeborg IF was the second team to gain promotion to the fourth-tier, returning after just a one-year absence. Silkeborg IF was placed higher than Vejen SF in the classification due to higher head-to-head points, despite Vejen SF having a better goal average. As winners of their respective groups, Aarhus GF and IK Aalborg Freja qualified for the league championship play-offs. Struer IF and Aabyhøj IF Thrott finished last in both their respective league groups and were relegated to the 1965 JBUs Serie 1. The tournament rules stipulated that a total of four should be relegated to the regional second-tier. Due to only one Jutland FA member club being relegated from the 1964 Kvalifikationsturneringen, the total number of relegations were reduced to three. As Holstebro BK had more points than IF Thrott Fodbold as the other second bottom team, they were reprieved from relegation for numerical reasons. Vejgaard BK was placed ahead of Holstebro BK in the classification due to head-to-head points.

== Teams ==
Twenty-four teams competed in the league, split into two groups with each twelve teams – sixteen teams from the previous season, four teams relegated from the fourth tier and four teams promoted from the four groups of the regional second-tier. The promoted teams were Hobro IK, Aabyhøj IF Thrott and the reserve team of Viborg FF, who were all playing in the regional top-flight league for the first time, while Vejen SF returned after a one-year absence. They replaced Lindholm IF, Skagen IK, Frederikshavn fI (reserves), Viby IF, IK Skovbakken (reserves) and Ikast FS (reserves), ending their regional top flight spells of two, one, twelve, seventeen, one and six year(s) respectively. The relegated teams were Silkeborg IF, who was experiencing their second consecutive relegation, while Vorup Frederiksberg BK, Brande IF and Holstebro BK, were returning to the sixth tier after a two, one and one season(s) respectively in the Jyllandsserien.

=== Stadia and locations ===
Locations of the 1964 Jutland Series teams.

Club	Location	Stadium	Capacity	Ref
IK Aalborg Freja	Aalborg	Baneanlægget i Vesterkæret	2,000	
Vorup Frederiksberg BK	Frederiksberg, Randers	Frederiksberg Stadium		
Aalborg BK (II)	Aalborg	Baneanlægget ved Ny Kærvej		
Viborg FF (II)	Viborg			
Skive IK	Skive	Skive Stadium	10,000	
Hjørring IF	Hjørring	Hjørring Stadium		
Hobro IK	Hobro	Hobro Stadium		
Randers SK Freja (II)	Randers	Randers Stadium		
IK Chang Aalborg (II)	Aalborg	Banen ved Provstejorden		
Vejgaard BK	Aalborg	Vejgaard Stadium		
Holstebro BK	Holstebro	Holstebro Idrætspark		
Struer IF	Struer	Struer Stadium		
Aarhus GF (II)	Aarhus	Aarhus Idrætspark; Aarhus Idrætspark (training field)	22,000	
Silkeborg IF	Silkeborg	Silkeborg Stadium		
Vejen SF	Vejen	Vejen Stadium		
Vejle BK (II)	Vejle	Vejle Stadium (athletics stadium)	20,000	
Esbjerg fB (II)	Esbjerg	Esbjerg Idrætspark (football stadium)	20,000	
Esbjerg KFUM	Esbjerg	Esbjerg Idrætspark (athletics stadium)		
Brande IF	Brande	Brande Stadium		
BK Herning Fremad	Herning	Herning Stadium ved Nørregaards Allé	9,000	
Haderslev FK	Haderslev	Haderslev Stadium (athletics stadium)		
Aabenraa BK	Aabenraa	Aabenraa Stadium		
AIA (II)	Aarhus	Aarhus Idrætspark (stadium); Aarhus Idrætspark (training field)		
Aabyhøj IF Thrott	Aarhus	Aabyhøj Stadium; Aarhus Idrætspark	22,000	

=== Personnel ===
Team	Head coach (Note: The line-up for each game was decided by members of a match selection committee, referred to as udtagelseskomite (UK) or spilleudvalg, while the coach was responsible for the physical training and game tactics. The rules stated that the coach was not allowed to instruct his players from the bench.)	Captain	Ref
IK Aalborg Freja	(Denmark) Arne Holt	(Denmark) Erik Juul Kristensen	
Vorup Frederiksberg BK	(Denmark) Roald Andersen		
Aalborg BK (II)	(Denmark) Arne Olsen		
Viborg FF (II)			
Skive IK			
Hjørring IF	(Denmark) Knud Jensen (Note: Knud Jensen resigned his senior coaching position due to a personal relocation to the city of Vejle.) (Denmark) Elo Kjær (Note: The club's then 23 years old youth coach Elo Kjær took over the role as senior coach on 30 April 1964 for the remaining part of the season.)		
Hobro IK	(Denmark) Frank Petersen (Note: According to plan Frank Petersen was contractually employed for two months, from 11 January until 29 February 1964.) (Denmark) Robert Andreasen (Note: Robert Andreasen took over as coach on 1 March 1964 for the remaining part of the season.)		
Randers SK Freja (II)	(Denmark) Carlo Bendtsen		
IK Chang Aalborg (II)			
Vejgaard BK	(Denmark) Ingemann Christensen		
Holstebro BK	? (Austria) Walther Pheiffer		
Struer IF	(Austria) Alois Pheiffer (Note: Alois Pheiffer was contractually employed from 1 January until his sacking on 28 April 1964.) (Denmark) Einer Jeppesen (Note: The club's then youth coach Einer Jeppesen was also engaged as senior coach on 29 April 1964 for the remaining part of the season.)		
Aarhus GF (II)		(Denmark) Erik Christensen	
Silkeborg IF	(Denmark) Poul Bjerre	(Denmark) Bjarne Jensen	
Vejen SF	(Denmark) Hans Henning Jacobsen		
Vejle BK (II)			
Esbjerg fB (II)			
Esbjerg KFUM			
Brande IF	(Denmark) Karl Emil Velling	(Denmark) Poul Munkholm	
BK Herning Fremad	(Denmark) Niels Poulsen		
Haderslev FK	(Hungary) Jozsef Szentgyörgyi		
Aabenraa BK	(Denmark) Edward Bodilsen	(Denmark) Sven Dall	
AIA (II)			
Aabyhøj IF Thrott			

=== Coaching changes ===
Team	Outgoing coach	Manner of departure	Date of vacancy	Position in table	Incoming coach	Date of appointment	Ref
Struer IF	(Austria) Rudi Strittich	End of contract	30 November 1963	Pre-season	(Austria) Alois Pheiffer	1 January 1964	
Aabenraa BK	(Hungary) Jozsef Szentgyörgyi	End of contract	31 December 1963	Pre-season	(Denmark) Edward Bodilsen	1 January 1964	
Silkeborg IF	(Denmark) Vestervig Madsen	End of contract	31 December 1963	Pre-season	(Denmark) Poul Bjerre	1 January 1964	
Vorup Frederiksberg BK	(Denmark) Søren Düür	End of contract	31 December 1963	Pre-season	(Denmark) Roald Andersen	1 January 1964	
Brande IF	(Denmark) Niels Peter Sørensen	End of contract	31 December 1963	Pre-season	(Denmark) Karl Emil Velling	1 January 1964	
Haderslev FK	(Denmark) Laurits "Lause" Andersen	End of contract	31 December 1963	Pre-season	(Hungary) Jozsef Szentgyörgyi	1 January 1964	
BK Herning Fremad	(Denmark) Karl Emil Velling	End of contract	31 December 1963	Pre-season	(Denmark) Niels Poulsen	1 January 1964	
Randers SK Freja	(Denmark) Alex Clausen	End of contract	31 December 1963	Pre-season	(Denmark) Carlo Bendtsen (Note: Carlo Bendtsen was already head coach for the club's senior team in the 2nd Division in the previous season.)	1 January 1964	
Vejgaard BK	(Denmark) John Quist	?	1963	Pre-season	(Denmark) Ingemann Christensen	1 January 1964	
Hobro IK	(Denmark) Egund Vestergaard	End of contract	31 December 1963	Pre-season	(Denmark) Frank Petersen	11 January 1964	
Hobro IK	(Denmark) Frank Petersen	End of contract	29 February 1964	Pre-season	(Denmark) Robert Andreasen	March 1964	
Struer IF	(Austria) Alois Pheiffer	Sacked	28 April 1964	11th	(Denmark) Einer Jeppesen	29 April 1964	
Hjørring IF	(Denmark) Knud Jensen	Resignation	29 April 1964	10th	(Denmark) Elo Kjær	30 April 1964	
Holstebro BK	(Denmark) Robert Andreasen	?	? 1963	Pre-season	?	? 1964	
Holstebro BK	?	?	? 1964	?	(Austria) Walther Pheiffer	13 August 1964	
Aabyhøj IF Thrott	(Denmark) Søren Hansen	?	? 1963	?	?	? 1964	

== League tables ==
Every team played two games against the other teams, at home and away, totaling 22 games each. Teams received two points for a win and one point for a draw. If two or more teams were tied on points, places were determined by goal average. The team with the most points were crowned winners of the league group, and qualified for the championship play-offs. The highest placed eligible non-reserve teams in each group were promoted to the 1965 Kvalifikationsturneringen. As a starting point, the two teams in each group with the fewest points would be relegated to the 1965 JBUs Serie 1, but the number of relegations would decrease or increase depending on the number of JBU member teams relegated from the 1964 Kvalifikationsturneringen.

=== Nordkredsen table ===
Pos	Team	Pld	W	D	L	GF	GA	GR	Pts	Promotion, qualification or relegation
1	IK Aalborg Freja (P)	22	17	4	1	59	22	2.682	38	Promotion to the 1965 Kvalifikationsturneringen & qualification for Championship play-offs
2	Vorup Frederiksberg BK	22	15	1	6	57	33	1.727	31	
3	Aalborg BK (II) (Note: Reserve teams were not eligible to be promoted to the 1965 Kvalifikationsturneringen.)	22	13	4	5	51	27	1.889	30	
4	Viborg FF (II)	22	10	2	10	49	53	0.925	22	
5	Skive IK	22	10	1	11	51	51	1.000	21 (Note: Skive IK finished ahead of Hjørring IF on head-to-head points: Skive IK 2–0 Hjørring IF (9 May 1964), Hjørring IF 1–1 Skive IK (26-27.09.1964).)	
6	Hjørring IF	22	8	5	9	34	45	0.756	21	
7	Hobro IK	22	8	4	10	42	47	0.894	20	
8	Randers SK Freja (II)	22	7	5	10	47	53	0.887	19	
9	IK Chang Aalborg (II)	22	7	3	12	50	58	0.862	17	
10	Vejgaard BK	22	6	4	12	40	51	0.784	16 (Note: Tied on head-to-head points; Vejgaard BK 1–0 Holstebro BK (23 May 1964), Holstebro BK 3–2 Vejgaard BK (24 October 1964). Overall goal average was used as the tiebreaker, hence Vejgaard BK finished ahead of Holstebro BK.)	
11	Holstebro BK	22	6	4	12	35	52	0.673	16	Reprieved from relegation; transferred to the 1965 Jutland Series, southern group (Note: As a result of only one Jutland FA member club being relegated from the fourth-tier, the number of relegations were reduced to three, and with Holstebro BK having more points than AIA as the two second bottom teams, they were reprieved from relegation for numerical reasons.)
12	Struer IF (R)	22	4	5	13	33	56	0.589	13	Relegation to the 1965 JBUs Serie 1

Rules for classification: 1) Points 2) Head-to-head points 3) Goal average
(P) Promoted; (R) Relegated

=== Sydkredsen table ===
Pos	Team	Pld	W	D	L	GF	GA	GR	Pts	Promotion, qualification or relegation
1	Aarhus GF (II) (Note: Reserve teams were not eligible to be promoted to the 1965 Kvalifikationsturneringen.) (C)	22	15	3	4	72	28	2.571	33	Qualification for Championship play-offs
2	Silkeborg IF (P)	22	13	3	6	64	45	1.422	29 (Note: Silkeborg IF finished ahead of Vejen SF and Vejle BK (II) on head-to-head points: Silkeborg IF 8, Vejen SF 4, Vejle BK (II) 0.)	Promotion to the 1965 Kvalifikationsturneringen
3	Vejen SF	22	14	1	7	59	35	1.686	29	
4	Vejle BK (II)	22	13	3	6	74	29	2.552	29	
5	Esbjerg fB (II)	22	12	4	6	57	27	2.111	28	
6	Esbjerg KFUM	22	10	4	8	31	46	0.674	24	
7	Brande IF	22	8	4	10	40	47	0.851	20	
8	BK Herning Fremad	22	6	6	10	35	49	0.714	18 (Note: Tied on head-to-head points; Haderslev FK 1–2 BK Herning Fremad (19 April 1964), BK Herning Fremad 4–5 Haderslev FK (6 September 1964). Overall goal average was used as the tiebreaker, hence BK Herning Fremad finished ahead of Haderslev FK.)	
9	Haderslev FK	22	7	4	11	41	67	0.612	18	
10	Aabenraa BK	22	7	3	12	29	45	0.644	17	
11	AIA (II) (R)	22	6	1	15	39	81	0.481	13	Relegation to the 1965 JBUs Serie 1
12	Aabyhøj IF Thrott (R)	22	1	4	17	27	69	0.391	6	Relegation to the 1965 JBUs Serie 1

Rules for classification: 1) Points 2) Head-to-head points 3) Goal average
(C) Champions; (P) Promoted; (R) Relegated

== Results ==
=== Nordkredsen results ===
Home \ Away	AAF	VFB	AAB	VFF	SIK	HIF	HIK	RSF	AAC	VBK	HBK	SIF
IK Aalborg Freja	—	2–1	2–1	4–2	5–1	4–0	2–2	4–0	1–0	3–2	2–0	2–1
Vorup Frederiksberg BK	1–1	—	0–2	8–1	2–0	1–3	5–3	4–2	1–0	4–0	2–0	5–1
Aalborg BK (II)	0–3	4–2	—	5–1	0–2	5–1	1–1	1–0	4–2	2–2	3–1	4–0
Viborg FF (II)	2–5	3–2	1–2	—	0–1	2–2	4–2	5–2	3–0	2–0	1–0	4–1
Skive IK	2–4	3–2	1–2	2–1	—	2–0	4–6	3–6	4–1	1–3	6–1	4–0
Hjørring IF	2–2	0–1	2–0	1–6	1–1	—	1–0	4–1	5–2	3–1	1–1	2–1
Hobro IK	1–1	0–4	2–3	1–3	2–1	1–3	—	3–1	2–1	1–3	5–2	0–2
Randers SK Freja (II)	4–1	0–1	1–1	3–3	4–6	3–1	1–0	—	6–2	4–1	1–0	2–2
IK Chang Aalborg (II)	0–4	2–3	1–1	1–2	4–3	3–0	3–1	7–3	—	3–3	8–3	1–1
Vejgaard BK	0–2	2–3	2–1	1–3	3–2	5–1	1–2	1–1	2–3	—	1–0	2–2
Holstebro BK	0–2	1–2	0–6	7–1	3–1	2–0	2–2	1–1	3–1	3–2	—	2–1
Struer IF	0–3	4–2	0–4	2–0	0–1	1–1	0–4	1–2	3–5	6–3	3–3	—

Legend: Blue = home team win; Yellow = draw; Red = away team win.

=== Sydkredsen results ===
Home \ Away	AGF	SIF	VSF	VBK	EFB	EKF	BIF	BHF	HFK	ABK	AIA	AIF
Aarhus GF (II)	—	1–2	1–3	0–0	1–0	2–3	4–1	3–1	6–3	3–0	7–0	3–1
Silkeborg IF	1–6	—	4–2	0–3	2–1	2–2	2–3	5–2	6–1	1–1	0–3	5–2
Vejen SF	1–5	3–4	—	5–0	0–3	1–0	3–1	2–2	5–3	0–1	8–0	2–0
Vejle BK (II)	2–1	0–4	0–1	—	3–3	6–0	7–0	2–2	6–0	0–1	8–0	9–0
Esbjerg fB (II)	0–1	1–2	3–2	2–1	—	0–0	2–1	1–1	7–0	3–0	6–0	4–2
Esbjerg KFUM	2–3	1–5	0–3	1–4	1–1	—	2–1	1–0	3–1	2–1	2–0	1–0
Brande IF	1–5	2–1	2–3	3–1	1–6	6–0	—	0–0	0–1	2–2	5–1	3–1
BK Herning Fremad	2–3	0–5	2–5	1–5	1–4	0–0	1–0	—	4–5	4–0	1–0	2–1
Haderslev FK	1–1	3–3	1–0	1–6	2–1	2–4	1–1	1–2	—	1–2	5–4	2–2
Aabenraa BK	2–2	2–3	1–3	1–4	2–4	5–1	0–2	2–0	1–2	—	1–2	2–1
AIA (II)	3–7	4–2	0–5	1–3	4–3	1–2	0–1	3–6	2–5	5–0	—	4–2
Aabyhøj IF Thrott	0–7	3–3	1–2	2–4	0–2	2–3	4–4	1–1	1–0	0–2	2–2	—

Legend: Blue = home team win; Yellow = draw; Red = away team win.

== Statistics ==
=== Scoring ===
==== Top scorers ====
Rank	Player	Club	Goals
1	(Denmark) Herluf Bang	Silkeborg IF	28
—	(Denmark) Jan Nielsen	Silkeborg IF	12

==== Hat-tricks ====
Player	For	Against	Result	Date	Ref
(Denmark) Per Madsen^{4}	Vejen SF	AIA (reserves)	8–0 (H)	12 April 1964	
(Denmark) Peter Thøgersen	Esbjerg fB (reserves)	AIA (reserves)	6–0 (H)	21 May 1964	
(Denmark) Per Gaardsøe	Randers SK Freja (reserves)	Viborg FF (reserves)	3–3 (H)	2 June 1964	
(Denmark) Helge Jensen^{5}	Vejle BK (reserves)	Aabyhøj IF Thrott	9–0 (H)	8 August 1964	
(Denmark) Egon Andreasen	Vejen SF	Aabenraa BK	3–1 (A)	16 August 1964	
(Denmark) Bjarne Knudsen	IK Chang Aalborg (reserves)	Holstebro BK	8–3 (H)	13 September 1964	
(Denmark) John Amdisen^{4}	Aarhus GF (reserves)	AIA (reserves)	7–3 (A)	20 September 1964	

^{4} Player scored 4 goals
^{5} Player scored 5 goals
(H) – Home team
(A) – Away team

=== Clean sheets ===
Rank	Player	Club	Matches	Clean sheets	Ref
—	(Denmark) Niels Hougård	Vorup Frederiksberg BK	5	4	
—	(Denmark) Hans E. Christensen	Skive IK	1	1	
—	(Denmark) Jørgen Bach	IK Aalborg Freja	1	1	
—	(Denmark) Bent Petersen	Aabenraa BK	1	1 (Note: Shortly before the halftime break in the match between Vejle BK (II) and Aabenraa BK on 3 May 1964, due to a knee injury, half back Fritz Jørgensen had to replace goalkeeper Bent Petersen before returning to the field a couple of minutes into the second half.)	

=== Discipline ===
==== Player ====
- Most warnings: 1
  - (Denmark) Heine Hald (Aalborg BK reserves) on 19 April 1964 against Hjørring IF
  - (Denmark) William Fahlberg (Vorup Frederiksberg BK) on 25 April 1964 against Aalborg BK reserves
  - (Denmark) Erik Hyldahl (Vorup Frederiksberg BK) on 25 April 1964 against Aalborg BK reserves
  - (Denmark) Henning Christensen (Holstebro BK) on 26 April 1964 against IK Chang Aalborg reserves
  - (Denmark) Bent Nissen (IK Chang Aalborg reserves) on 26 April 1964 against Holstebro BK
  - (Denmark) Knud Erik Jensen (Esbjerg KFUM) of 2 May 1964 against BK Herning Fremad
- Most evictions: 1
  - (Denmark) Bjarne Knudsen (IK Chang Aalborg reserves) on 26 April 1964 against Holstebro BK
  - (Denmark) Jørgen Hansen (Vejen SF) on 3 May 1964 against Haderslev FK
  - (Denmark) Allan Voigt (Vorup Frederiksberg BK) on 24 May 1964 against Struer IF

==== Club ====
- Most warnings: 2
  - Vorup Frederiksberg BK
- Most evictions: 1
  - IK Chang Aalborg (reserves), Vejen SF and Vorup Frederiksberg BK

== Championship play-offs ==
=== Summary ===
The final for the Jutlandic Series League Championship was contested at Hobro Stadium between the winners of the northern and southern groups, IK Aalborg Freja and the reserve team of Aarhus GF. An agreement on the location and date/time of the final could not be reached among the clubs themselves, so on 11 November the Jutland FA determined that the match would be played at a neutral ground in Hobro on 15 November 1964 – at the exact same time that the final top-flight league match of the season involving Aarhus GF's first senior team. The line-up of Aarhus GF consisted of seven footballers, that had previously played on the club's senior team in the top-flight league, while Leif Olsen, Per Simonsen, Søren Knoth and Christian Kryger were relatively young players. Full back and Erik Christensen was the only player on Aarhus GF's team to have played in every single match of the season. Left winger Christian Kryger had previously played on Odense BK's first senior team. Jørgen Abildgaard replaced Per left full back Per Nielsen, but otherwise the line-up of IK Aalborg Freja for the final was the same as in the previous league matches.

Twenty minutes into the match, Aarhus GF's center forward Verner Hermansen received a hard kick to the leg after a collision with the opponent's Jørgen Abildgård, making him to leave the field for a few minutes to recover before entering the game again, but shortly thereafter he was forced to leave the game completely and watch the rest of the final from the spectator stands. Playmaker Kjeld Jensen moved in as the new center forward. While the Aarhus GF players had the best start to the match, they did not manage to get past IK Aalborg Freja's defense and goalkeeper Jørgen Bach. At the end of the first half, the IK Aalborg Freja players had several scoring opportunities against Aarhus GF's remaining ten players on the field. On one occasion, when battling for the ball in front of Aarhus GF's goal line in the 35th minute of play, the Aarhus GF player Leif Olsen was attempting to kick the ball, resulting in the ball rolling towards the goal with the full back Arne Jensen trying to clear the ball, but instead accidentally hit his teammate, winger Viggo Holm, and the ball went into the goal.

At the very start of the second half, a heavy downpour set in, making the field very greasy and hampered the game for the rest of the match. After eight minutes of play in the second half, Aarhus GF tied the match. The referee awarded a controversial penalty kick, following a foul for use of hands committed by right half back Ole Schultz, which was executed by Aarhus GF's left inner winger Søren Knoth. Three minutes later, the Aarhus-based team secured their victory in the match, when right winger Kjeld Jensen got clear of the defense and managed to net the decisive ball close to one of the goal posts outside the reach of goalkeeper Jørgen Bach.

The Jutlandic Football League Championship was the 11th title won by Aarhus GF of which nine had been won by the first team up to and including the 1935–36 season and the two subsequent titles by the reserve team. At the award ceremony right after the conclusion of the match, the Jutland FA representative C. M. Nielsen handed Aarhus GF's captain Erik Christensen a gift of remembrance and pins with an emblem to each of the players, before asking the opponents to rise and say hurrah for the winners.

=== Details ===
15 November 1964
13:00 CET

Aarhus GF (reserves)	2–1	IK Aalborg Freja
Viggo Holm 35' (o.g.); Søren Knoth 53' (pen.); Kjeld Jensen 56'

Hobro Stadium, Hobro

Aarhus GF (reserves)	IK Aalborg Freja

GK	1	(Denmark) John Leo Jensen
FB	2	(Denmark) Erik Christensen (c)
FB	3	(Denmark) Arne Jensen
HB	4	(Denmark) Leif Olsen
HB	5	(Denmark) Viggo Holm
HB	6	(Denmark) Per Simonsen
FW	7	(Denmark) Kjeld Jensen
FW	8	(Denmark) Ove Sørensen
FW	9	(Denmark) Verner Hermansen
FW	10	(Denmark) Søren Knoth
FW	11	(Denmark) Christian Kryger
Head coach:
—

GK	1	(Denmark) Jørgen Bach
FB	2	(Denmark) Mogens Madsen
FB	3	(Denmark) Jørgen Abildgaard
HB	4	(Denmark) Ole Schultz
HB	5	(Denmark) Erik Juul Kristensen (c)
HB	6	(Denmark) Christian Frederiksen
FW	7	(Denmark) Per Hjørringgaard
FW	8	(Denmark) Per Larsen
FW	9	(Denmark) John Meyer
FW	10	(Denmark) Jens Ole Nielsen
FW	11	(Denmark) Leif Larsen
Head coach:
(Denmark) Arne Holt

Match rules

- 90 minutes.
- No substitutes.
