= 2021–22 Danish 3rd Division =

Danish 3rd Division
- Season: 2021–22

The 2021–22 Danish 3rd Division was the first edition of the reinstated Danish 3rd Division since the 1990 season. The season started with a group of twelve teams. After 22 rounds the group was split in a promotion group and a relegation group. The top two teams of the promotion group was promoted to the 2022–23 Danish 2nd Division.

== Participants ==
Karlslunde IF, Herlev IF, IF Lyseng, and Young Boys FD were promoted from the 2020–21 Denmark Series.

=== Stadia and locations ===
Locations of the 2021–22 Danish 3rd Division teams. Copenhagen teams: Frem, Herlev, and Vanløse
Roskilde teams: FC Roskilde and KFUM Roskilde

Club	Location	Stadium	Turf	Capacity	2020–21 position
Dalum IF	Odense	Dalum Stadion	Natural	4,000	9th in Group 1
FC Roskilde	Roskilde	Roskilde Idrætspark	Natural	6,000	7th in Group 2
Frem	Copenhagen	Valby Idrætspark	Natural	12,000	8th in Group 1
Herlev IF	Herlev	Herlev Stadion	Natural	3,500	DS, 2nd P1
IF Lyseng	Aarhus	Lyseng Idrætscenter	Artificial	2,000	DS, 1st P2
Karlslunde IF	Karlslunde	Karlslunde Stadion	Natural	1,500	DS, 1st P1
KFUM Roskilde	Roskilde	Lillevang Idrætscenter	Natural	1,500	10th in Group 2
Næsby BK	Odense	ALPI Arena Næsby	Natural	2,500	10th in Group 1
Slagelse B&I	Slagelse	Harboe Arena Slagelse	Natural	10,000	9th in Group 2
Vanløse IF	Copenhagen	Vanløse Idrætspark	Natural	10,000	8th in Group 2
VSK Aarhus	Aarhus	Vejlby Stadium	Natural	5,000	7th in Group 1
Young Boys FD	Silkeborg	Søholt Idrætsanlæg	Natural	1,500	DS, 2nd P2

== League table ==
Pos	Team	Pld	W	D	L	GF	GA	GD	Pts	Promotion or Relegation
1	FC Roskilde	22	13	8	1	67	29	+38	47	Qualification to Promotion Group
2	BK Frem	22	11	8	3	49	23	+26	41	Qualification to Promotion Group
3	VSK Aarhus	22	10	7	5	41	29	+12	37	Qualification to Promotion Group
4	Næsby BK	22	9	7	6	36	29	+7	34	Qualification to Promotion Group
5	IF Lyseng	22	9	4	9	33	45	−12	31	Qualification to Promotion Group
6	Dalum IF	22	7	9	6	32	29	+3	30	Qualification to Promotion Group
7	Young Boys FD	22	8	5	9	40	38	+2	29	Qualification to Relegation Group
8	Vanløse IF	22	8	4	10	25	34	−9	28	Qualification to Relegation Group
9	KFUM Roskilde	22	6	7	9	29	35	−6	25	Qualification to Relegation Group
10	Karlslunde IF	22	7	4	11	32	46	−14	25	Qualification to Relegation Group
11	Slagelse B&I	22	6	6	10	26	39	−13	24	Qualification to Relegation Group
12	Herlev IF	22	3	1	18	16	50	−34	10	Qualification to Relegation Group

Updated to match(es) played on 9 April 2022. Source: Danish FA
Rules for classification: 1) points; 2) goal difference; 3) number of goals scored

== Promotion Group ==
The top 6 teams will compete for 2 spots in the 2022–23 Danish 2nd Division. Points and goals carried over in full from the regular season.

Pos	Team	Pld	W	D	L	GF	GA	GD	Pts	Qualification or relegation	ROS	FRE	VSK	NSB	DAL	LYS
1	FC Roskilde (P)	32	20	9	3	93	38	+55	69	Promotion to Danish 2nd Division	—	0–2	5–0	2–2	3–0	4–0
2	BK Frem (P)	32	17	9	6	72	38	+34	60	Promotion to Danish 2nd Division	1–4	—	3–1	4–1	1–2	6–2
3	VSK Aarhus	32	15	8	9	56	45	+11	53		2–0	1–1	—	4–2	3–1	2–0
4	Næsby BK	32	13	8	11	53	46	+7	47		1–2	2–1	1–2	—	3–0	3–1
5	Dalum IF	32	11	9	12	42	47	−5	42		1–4	1–2	2–0	1–0	—	2–1
6	IF Lyseng	32	11	4	17	40	68	−28	37		0–2	1–2	1–0	0–2	1–0	—

Updated to match(es) played on 11 June 2022. Source: Danish Football Association (in Danish), Soccerway
Legend: Blue = home team win; Yellow = draw; Red = away team win.
Rules for classification: 1) Points; 2) Goal difference; 3) Goals scored; 4) Away goals scored; 5) Play-off (played on neutral ground if determining teams for different rounds); 6) Draw.
(P) Promoted

== Relegation Group ==
The bottom 6 teams will compete to avoid the 4 relegations spots to the 2022–23 Denmark Series. Points and goals carried over in full from the regular season.

Pos	Team	Pld	W	D	L	GF	GA	GD	Pts	Qualification or relegation	YOU	VAN	KAR	SLA	KFU	HER
1	Young Boys FD	32	13	10	9	57	48	+9	49		—	2–2	1–1	1–1	1–1	2–0
2	Vanløse IF	32	13	8	11	40	40	0	47		1–2	—	0–0	1–0	0–0	3–0
3	Karlslunde IF (R)	32	11	6	15	59	57	+2	39	Relegation to Denmark Series	1–2	1–2	—	4–1	4–0	10–0
4	Slagelse B&I (R)	32	10	9	13	40	52	−12	39	Relegation to Denmark Series	0–0	1–3	2–1	—	2–0	3–0
5	KFUM Roskilde (R)	32	7	9	16	38	57	−19	30	Relegation to Denmark Series	0–2	0–3	2–1	2–3	—	2–3
6	Herlev IF (R)	32	5	3	24	27	81	−54	18	Relegation to Denmark Series	3–4	0–0	1–4	1–1	3–2	—

Updated to match(es) played on 11 June 2022. Source: Danish Football Association (in Danish), Soccerway
Legend: Blue = home team win; Yellow = draw; Red = away team win.
Rules for classification: 1) Points; 2) Goal difference; 3) Goals scored; 4) Away goals scored; 5) Play-off (played on neutral ground if determining teams for different rounds); 6) Draw.
(R) Relegated
