= List of Kastrup Boldklub seasons =

The following is a list of seasons played by Kastrup Boldklub from the founding of the club up to the most recent season.

== Key ==
- P = Played
- W = Games won
- D = Games drawn
- L = Games lost
- F = Goals for
- A = Goals against
- Pts = Points
- Position = Final position in table
- Level = Level in the football league system
- Avg. Att. = Average attendance at home
- Europe = European competition entered
- Other = Other relevant competitions
- Result = Result in that competition
- — = Did not Qualify
- Group = Group stage
- DSQ = Disqualified
- DNE = Did not enter
- QR1 = First Qualifying Round
- QR2 = Second Qualifying Round
- QR3 = Third Qualifying Round
- R1 = Round 1
- R2 = Round 2
- R3 = Round 3
- R4 = Round 4
- R16 = Round of 16
- QF = Quarter-finals
- SF = Semi-finals
- RU = Runners-Up
- W = Winners

1st or W	Winners/Champions
2nd or RU	Runners-up
↑	Promoted
↓	Relegated
♦	Top scorer in division

== Danmarksturneringen i fodbold ==
Season	League										Cup	Europe / Other		Avg. Home Attendance^{1}	Top goalscorer(s)^{1}	
Season	Level	Division	P	W	D	L	F	A	Pts	Position	Cup	Competition	Result	Avg. Home Attendance^{1}	Name	Goals
1934–35	5	KBUs B-række	18				30	68	9	16th of 19	—N/a	—		—N/a	—N/a	—N/a
1935–36	5	KBUs B-række	17				21	83	4	18th of 18	—N/a	—		—N/a	—N/a	—N/a
1936–37	5	KBUs B-række	15				17	67	6	14th of 16	—N/a	—		—N/a	—N/a	—N/a
1937–38	5	KBUs B-række	14				21	55	5	14th of 15	—N/a	—		—N/a	—N/a	—N/a
1938–39	5	KBUs B-række	13				32	35	10	10th of 14	—N/a	—		—N/a	—N/a	—N/a
1939–40	5	KBUs B-række	13				27	47	8	11th of 14	—N/a	—		—N/a	—N/a	—N/a
1940–41	3	KBUs B-række	15				43	41	15	9th of 16	—N/a	—		—N/a	—N/a	—N/a
1941–42	3	KBUs B-række	18				64	39	25	5th of 19	—N/a	—		—N/a	—N/a	—N/a
1942–43	3	KBUs B-række	17				74	23	27	3rd of 18	—N/a	—		—N/a	—N/a	—N/a
1943–44	3	KBUs B-række	18				76	43	32	2nd of 19	—N/a	—		—N/a	—N/a	—N/a
1944–45	3	KBUs B-række	14				39	20	19	4th of 15	—N/a	—		—N/a	—N/a	—N/a
1945–46	5	KBUs B-række	15							? of 16	—N/a	—		—N/a	—N/a	—N/a
1946–47	5	KBUs B-række	15				39	40	16	8th of 16	—N/a	—		—N/a	—N/a	—N/a
1947–48	6	KBUs A-række	18				52	27	26	2nd of 10	—N/a	—		—N/a	—N/a	—N/a
1948–49	6	KBUs A-række	18				66	18	26	2nd of 10	—N/a	—		—N/a	—N/a	—N/a
1949–50	6	KBUs A-række	18				71	17	30	1st of 10	—N/a	—		—N/a	—N/a	—N/a
1950–51	5	KBUs Mellemrække	18				42	22	22	4th of 10	—N/a	—		—N/a	—N/a	—N/a
1951–52	5	KBUs Mellemrække	18				45	29	22	3rd of 10	—N/a	—		—N/a	—N/a	—N/a
1952–53	5	KBUs Mellemrække	18				66	27	28	1st of 10	—N/a	—		—N/a	—N/a	—N/a
1953–54	4	Copenhagen Series	18							6th of 10	—N/a	—		—N/a	—N/a	—N/a
1954–55	4	Copenhagen Series	18							1st of 10	—N/a	—		—N/a	—N/a	—N/a
1955–56	4	Copenhagen Series	18							5th of 10	—N/a	—		—N/a	—N/a	—N/a
1956–57	4	Copenhagen Series	18							4th of 10	—N/a	—		—N/a	—N/a	—N/a
1958	4	Copenhagen Series	18							5th of 10	—N/a	—		—N/a	—N/a	—N/a
1959	5	Copenhagen Series	18							1st of 10	—N/a	—		—N/a	—N/a	—N/a
1960	4	Kvalifikationsturneringen	22	12	5	5	41	27	29	3rd of 12	—N/a	—		—N/a	—N/a	—N/a
1961	4	Kvalifikationsturneringen	22	3	5	14	26	62	11	11th of 12	—N/a	—		—N/a	—N/a	—N/a
1962	5	Copenhagen Series	18							4th of 10	—N/a	—		—N/a	—N/a	—N/a
1963	5	Copenhagen Series	18							4th of 10	—N/a	—		—N/a	—N/a	—N/a
1964	5	Copenhagen Series	18							2nd of 10	—N/a	—		—N/a	—N/a	—N/a
1965	5	Copenhagen Series	22							8th of 12	—N/a	—		—N/a	—N/a	—N/a
1966	5	Copenhagen Series	22							1st of 12	—N/a	—		—N/a	—N/a	—N/a
1967	5	Copenhagen Series	22							1st of 12	—N/a	—		—N/a	—N/a	—N/a
1968	4	Denmark Series, Group 1	22							6th of 12	—N/a	—		—N/a	—N/a	—N/a
1969	4	Denmark Series, Group 1	22							1st of 12	—N/a	—		—N/a	—N/a	—N/a
1970	3	3rd Division East	22	5	6	11	23	34	16	9th of 12	—N/a	—		—N/a	—N/a	—N/a
1971	3	3rd Division East	22	10	4	8	39	41	24	5th of 12	—N/a	—		—N/a	—N/a	—N/a
1972	3	3rd Division East	22	7	7	8	38	39	21	6th of 12	—N/a	—		—N/a	—N/a	—N/a
1973	3	3rd Division East	22	14	2	6	48	28	30	3rd of 12	—N/a	—		—N/a	—N/a	—N/a
1974	3	3rd Division East	22	14	4	4	51	23	32	1st of 12; Won Division title final	—N/a	—		—N/a	—N/a	—N/a
1975	2	2nd Division	30	19	7	4	70	37	45	1st of 16	—N/a	—		—N/a	—N/a	—N/a
1976	1	1st Division	30	9	8	13	38	45	26	10th of 16	—N/a	—		—N/a	—N/a	—N/a
1977	1	1st Division	30	14	6	10	45	36	34	6th of 16	—N/a	—		—N/a	—N/a	—N/a
1978	1	1st Division	30	9	7	14	38	40	25	11th of 16	—N/a	—		—N/a	—N/a	—N/a
1979	1	1st Division	30	13	11	6	45	30	37	4th of 16	—N/a	—		—N/a	—N/a	—N/a
1980	1	1st Division	30	9	9	12	34	35	27	13th of 16	—N/a	IC	G2, 3rd	—N/a	—N/a	—N/a
1981	1	1st Division	30	6	11	13	30	42	23	14th of 16	—N/a	—		—N/a	—N/a	—N/a
1982	2	2nd Division	30	15	9	6	40	26	39	4th of 16	—N/a	—		—N/a	—N/a	—N/a
1983	2	2nd Division	30	13	11	6	46	22	37	4th of 16	—N/a	—		—N/a	—N/a	—N/a
1984	2	2nd Division	30	18	5	7	51	29	41	3rd of 16	—N/a	—		—N/a	—N/a	—N/a
1985	1	1st Division	30	12	6	12	35	37	30	9th of 16	—N/a	—		—N/a	—N/a	—N/a
1986	1	1st Division	26	4	6	16	19	39	14	12th of 14	—N/a	—		—N/a	—N/a	—N/a
1987	1	1st Division	26	1	6	19	19	62	8	14th of 14	—N/a	—		—N/a	—N/a	—N/a
1988	2	2nd Division	26	3	8	15	27	56	14	14th of 14	—N/a	—		—N/a	—N/a	—N/a
1989	3	3rd Division East	26	7	9	10	34	46	23	10th of 14	—N/a	—		—N/a	—N/a	—N/a
1990	3	3rd Division West	26	12	9	5	48	31	33	4th of 14	—N/a	—		—N/a	—N/a	—N/a
1991 spring	3	2nd Division East, playoffs	18	4	5	9	23	29	13	10th of 10	—N/a	—		—N/a	—N/a	—N/a
1991 autumn	3	2nd Division East, preliminary play	18	5	4	9	19	21	14	8th of 10	—N/a	—		—N/a	—N/a	—N/a
1992 spring	4	2nd Division East, playoffs	14	5	4	5	17	18	14	5th of 8	—N/a	—		—N/a	—N/a	—N/a
1992 autumn	3	2nd Division East, preliminary play	18	5	5	8	24	31	19	8th of 10	—N/a	—		—N/a	—N/a	—N/a
1993 spring	4	2nd Division East, playoffs	14	5	5	4	—N/a	—N/a	15	4th of 8	—N/a	—		—N/a	—N/a	—N/a
1993 autumn	3	2nd Division East, preliminary play	18	4	5	9	25	38	18 (5)	8th of 10	—N/a	—		—N/a	—N/a	—N/a
1994 spring	4	2nd Division East, playoffs	14	4	3	7	20	36	11	5th of 8	—N/a	—		—N/a	—N/a	—N/a
1994 autumn	3	2nd Division East, preliminary play	18	7	1	10	32	42	19 (4)	8th of 10	—N/a	—		—N/a	—N/a	—N/a
1995 spring	4	2nd Division East, playoffs	14	0	1	13	8	43	1	8th of 8	—N/a	—		—N/a	—N/a	—N/a
1995 autumn	3	2nd Division East	14	4	3	7	30	32	15	7th of 8	—N/a	—		—N/a	—N/a	—N/a
1996	4	Denmark Series, Group 1	26	14	4	8	64	46	46	3rd of 14	—N/a	—		—N/a	—N/a	—N/a
1997	4	Denmark Series, Group 1	26	6	7	13	49	61	25	12th of 14	—N/a	—		—N/a	—N/a	—N/a
1998	5	Denmark Series, Group 1	26	5	4	17	32	62	19	12th of 14	—N/a	—		—N/a	—N/a	—N/a
1999	6	Copenhagen Series	26	14	6	6	47	32	48	4th of 14	—N/a	—		—N/a	—N/a	—N/a
2000	6	Copenhagen Series	26	7	6	13	52	51	27	11th of 14	—N/a	—		—N/a	—N/a	—N/a
2001	6	Copenhagen Series	26	12	7	7	45	31	43	6th of 14	—N/a	—		—N/a	—N/a	—N/a
2001	6	Copenhagen Series	26	12	7	7	45	31	43	6th of 14	—N/a	—		—N/a	—N/a	—N/a
2002	6	Copenhagen Series	26	9	5	12	47	50	32	7th of 14	—N/a	—		—N/a	—N/a	—N/a
2003	6^{2}	Reserve team for Amager United														
2004	6^{2}	Reserve team for Amager United														
2005 spring	5^{2}	Reserve team for Amager United														
2005–06	4^{2}	Reserve team for Amager United														
2006–07	4^{2}	Reserve team for Amager United														
2007–08	4	Denmark Series, Group 1	30	12	4	14	48	54	45	9th of 16	R1	—		—N/a	—N/a	—N/a
2008–09	4^{3}	Denmark Series, Group 1	26	11	5	10	39	34	38	8th of 14; Administrative regulation	—N/a	—		—N/a	—N/a	—N/a
2009–10	6	KBU Series 1, Group 1	26	17	2	7	76	39	53	4th of 14	—N/a	—		—N/a	—N/a	—N/a
2010–11	6	DBU Copenhagen Series 1, Group 1	26	19	4	3	90	32	61	2nd of 14	R3	—		—N/a	—N/a	—N/a
2011–12	5	Copenhagen Series	26	14	10	2	57	24	52	2nd of 14; Won promotion playoffs	R2	—		—N/a	—N/a	—N/a
2012–13	4	Denmark Series, Group 1	26	4	9	13	34	44	21	13th of 14	QR3	—		—N/a	Martin Skov Petersen	17 ♦
2013–14	5	Copenhagen Series	26	17	2	7	54	36	53	1st of 14	QR4	—		—N/a	—N/a	—N/a
2014–15	4	Denmark Series, Group 1	26	9	7	10	49	48	34	7th of 14	QR4	—		—N/a	Martin Skov Petersen	15
2015–16	4	Denmark Series, Group 1	26	13	7	6	51	40	46	2nd of 14; Lost promotion playoffs	QR4	—		—N/a	Kristoffer Heeris	14
2016–17	4	Denmark Series, Group 1	27	12	4	11	46	42	40	5th of 10	—N/a	—		—N/a	—N/a	—N/a
2017–18	4	Denmark Series, Group 1	27	7	8	12	46	64	29	7th of 10	—N/a	—		—N/a	—N/a	—N/a
2018–19	4	Denmark Series, Group 2	27	—N/a	—N/a	—N/a	—N/a	—N/a	—N/a	—N/a	—N/a	—		—N/a	—N/a	—N/a

^{1}: League games only, not including championship, promotion and relegation play-offs
^{2}: Status as reserve team for Amager United. Amager United played using Kastrup Boldklub's league license
^{3}: Status as reserve team for FC Amager
