= 1964 Kvalifikationsturneringen =

Kvalifikationsturneringen
- Season: 1964
- Dates: 26 March – 15 November 1964
- Champions: BK Fremad Amager (1st title)
- Promoted: BK Fremad Amager; IF Fuglebakken
- Relegated: Frederiksberg BK; BK Rødovre; Holte IF; BK Dalgas; Brønderslev IF; B 1921; Assens G&IK
- Matches: 132
- Goals: 475 (3.6 per match)
- Top goalscorer: Bjarne Hinrichsen (21 goals)
- Biggest home win: BK Dalgas 9–0 Assens G&IK (3 May 1964)
- Biggest away win: IK Viking 0–6 BK Fremad Amager (15 November 1964)
- Highest scoring: Holte IF 6–3 Assens G&IK (23 August 1964); BK Dalgas 9–0 Assens G&IK (3 May 1964)

The 1964 Kvalifikationsturneringen (Danish: Danmarksturneringens Kvalifikationsturnering 1964) was the fourteenth edition of the Danish fourth-tier association football division since its establishment in 1950 as part of the Danmarksturneringen's nation-wide league structure. Governed by the Danish FA, the season was launched in March 1964, and the last round of matches concluded on 15 November 1964. KFUM København and BK Rødovre entered as relegated teams from last season's third division, while IK Viking, BK Dalgas, Assens G&IK, IF Fuglebakken, Brønderslev IF, B 1921 and Holte IF entered as promoted teams from the 1963 Bornholm Series, 1963 Copenhagen Series, 1963 Funen Series, 1963 Jutland Series, 1963 Lolland-Falster Series and 1963 Zealand Series respectively. The twelve teams in the division entered the 1964–65 Danish Cup in the cup tournament's qualifying rounds. Fixtures for the 1964 season were announced on 6 January 1964.

BK Fremad Amager won the league, securing their first fourth-tier division title, and returning to the third-tier league after a two-years absence, with IF Fuglebakken becoming the runners-up, gaining promotion to the third-tier league for the first time in the club's history. At the end of the season, the seven clubs with the fewest points in the final league standings, Frederiksberg BK, BK Rødovre, Holte IF, BK Dalgas, Brønderslev IF, B 1921 and Assens G&IK, were relegated to the regional top-flight leagues. Bjarne Hinrichsen of Frederiksberg BK became the league's top scorer, netting a total of 21 goals.

== Summary ==
Fixtures for the 1964 season were announced by the Danish FA's tournament committee on 6 January 1964, and featured a nine weeks long summer break.

BK Fremad Amager and IF Fuglebakken both secured their promotions to the third-tier on 26 October 1964 by winning their home games against BK Dalgas and B 1921 respectively, while the then closest competitor Kalundborg GF&BK only managed to tie their away game against Assens G&IK – gaining a seven-point lead with just two rounds remaining. The league division title was determined and won by BK Fremad Amager on match 22. The award ceremony was held during the break of the match between IK Viking and BK Fremad Amager on 15 November with the Danish FA's representative Preben Engset (Svaneke) presenting the league trophy to the captain of BK Fremad Amager.

== Teams ==
Twelve teams competed in the league – three teams from the previous season, two teams relegated from the third tier and seven teams promoted from the regional top-flight leagues of Bornholm, Copenhagen, Funen, Jutland, Lolland-Falster and Zealand. The promoted teams were Brønderslev IF, IF Fuglebakken, Holte IF, Assens G&IK, BK Dalgas, all five clubs entered the fourth-tier league for the first time in their history, B 1921, returning after a two-year absence, and IK Viking, returning after a one-year absence. They replaced Silkeborg IF, Brande IF, Otterup B&IK, Holstebro BK, Rønne IK, Vorup-Frederiksberg BK and Helsingør IF, ending their fourth-tier spells of one, one, one, one, one, two and two years respectively. The relegated teams were KFUM København and BK Rødovre, both entered the fourth nation-wide division for the first time, replacing Svendborg fB, who entered the third division for the first time, ending their spell in the fourth-tier of two years, and Nakskov BK, who returned to the third division after a four years absence.

=== Stadiums and locations ===
Locations of the 1964 Kvalifikationsturneringen teams.

| Club | Location | Stadium | Capacity | Ref |
|---|---|---|---|---|
| BK Fremad Amager | Sundbyvester, Copenhagen | Sundby Idrætspark | | |
| IF Fuglebakken | Aarhus | Riisvangen Stadium | | |
| Kalundborg GF&BK | Kalundborg | Gisseløre Stadium | | |
| KFUM København | Emdrup, Copenhagen | Emdrupparken | | |
| IK Viking | Rønne | Rønne Stadion Nord | | |
| Frederiksberg BK | Frederiksberg | Frederiksberg Idrætspark | | |
| BK Rødovre | Rødovre | Rødovre Stadium | | |
| Holte IF | Holte | Rudegaard Stadium | | |
| BK Dalgas | Frederiksberg | Frederiksberg Idrætspark | | |
| Brønderslev IF | Brønderslev | Brønderslev Stadium | | |
| B 1921 | Nykøbing Falster | Nykøbing Falster Stadium | | |
| Assens G&IK | Assens | Assens Stadium | | |

=== Personnel ===
| Team | Head coach (Note: The line-up for each game was decided by members of a match selection committee, referred to as udtagelseskomite (UK) or spilleudvalg, while the coach was responsible for the physical training and game tactics. The rules stated that the coach was not allowed to instruct his players from the bench.) | Captain | Ref |
|---|---|---|---|
| BK Fremad Amager | (Denmark) Oluf Wiborg | | |
| IF Fuglebakken | (Denmark) Jens Iversen | | |
| Kalundborg GF&BK | (Denmark) Harald Gronemann | | |
| KFUM København | (Denmark) Arnold Olsen (Note: Arnold Olsen was contractually employed from 196? until his resignation on 13 September 1964.) (Denmark) Jørgen Hvidemose (Note: Jørgen Hvidemose took over as coach on 22 September 1964 for the remaining part of the season.) | | |
| IK Viking | (Denmark) Aksel Mogensen | | |
| Frederiksberg BK | (Denmark) Erik Dennung | | |
| BK Rødovre | (Denmark) Bent Østerholdt | | |
| Holte IF | (Denmark) Aage Boe | | |
| BK Dalgas | (Denmark) Kristian Jensen | | |
| Brønderslev IF | (Denmark) Edvard Thomsen | (Denmark) Kaj Nørkjær | |
| B 1921 | (Denmark) Orla Henriksen | | |
| Assens G&IK | (Denmark) Knud Clemmensen | | |

=== Coaching changes ===
| Team | Outgoing coach | Manner of departure | Date of vacancy | Position in table | Incoming coach | Date of appointment | Ref |
|---|---|---|---|---|---|---|---|
| IK Viking | (Denmark) Herman Blangshøj | Sacked | October/November 1963 | Pre-season | (Denmark) Aksel Mogensen | 1 January 1964 | |
| BK Rødovre | (Denmark) Henning Jensen | End of contract | 31 December 1963 | Pre-season | (Denmark) Bent Østerholdt | 1 January 1964 | |
| KFUM København | (Denmark) K. K. Hansen | End of contract | 31 December 1963 | Pre-season | (Denmark) Arnold Olsen | 1 January 1964 | |
| KFUM København | (Denmark) Arnold Olsen | Resignation | 13 September 1964 | 4th | (Denmark) Jørgen Hvidemose | 22 September 1964 | |

== League table ==
| Pos | Team | Pld | W | D | L | GF | GA | GR | Pts | Promotion, qualification or relegation |
|---|---|---|---|---|---|---|---|---|---|---|
| 1 | BK Fremad Amager (C, P) | 22 | 16 | 4 | 2 | 59 | 18 | 3.278 | 36 | Promotion to the 1965 Danish 3rd Division |
| 2 | IF Fuglebakken (P) | 22 | 13 | 5 | 4 | 45 | 31 | 1.452 | 31 | Promotion to the 1965 Danish 3rd Division |
| 3 | Kalundborg GF&BK | 22 | 11 | 5 | 6 | 57 | 27 | 2.111 | 27 | |
| 4 | KFUM København | 22 | 11 | 4 | 7 | 42 | 26 | 1.615 | 26 | |
| 5 | IK Viking | 22 | 12 | 2 | 8 | 41 | 48 | 0.854 | 26 | |
| 6 | Frederiksberg BK (R) | 22 | 8 | 9 | 5 | 48 | 49 | 0.980 | 25 | Relegation to the 1965 Copenhagen Series |
| 7 | BK Rødovre (R) | 22 | 8 | 4 | 10 | 33 | 30 | 1.100 | 20 | Relegation to the 1965 Copenhagen Series |
| 8 | Holte IF (R) | 22 | 9 | 1 | 12 | 33 | 40 | 0.825 | 19 | Relegation to the 1965 Zealand Series |
| 9 | BK Dalgas (R) | 22 | 5 | 6 | 11 | 38 | 39 | 0.974 | 16 | Relegation to the 1965 Copenhagen Series |
| 10 | Brønderslev IF (R) | 22 | 4 | 7 | 11 | 17 | 30 | 0.567 | 15 | Relegation to the 1965 Jutland Series |
| 11 | B 1921 (R) | 22 | 5 | 2 | 15 | 29 | 64 | 0.453 | 12 | Relegation to the 1965 Lolland-Falster Series |
| 12 | Assens G&IK (R) | 22 | 4 | 3 | 15 | 33 | 73 | 0.452 | 11 | Relegation to the 1965 Funen Series |

Rules for classification: 1) Points 2) Goal average
(C) Champions; (P) Promoted; (R) Relegated

== Results ==
| Home \ Away | BFA | IFF | KGB | KFU | IKV | FBK | BKR | HIF | BKD | BIF | B21 | AGI |
|---|---|---|---|---|---|---|---|---|---|---|---|---|
| BK Fremad Amager | — | 4–3 | 3–1 | 2–1 | 3–0 | 5–0 | 1–2 | 3–0 | 3–0 | 2–0 | 6–0 | 2–1 |
| IF Fuglebakken | 0–0 | — | 2–1 | 1–0 | 5–0 | 3–2 | 2–5 | 0–2 | 1–1 | 1–1 | 4–2 | 5–2 |
| Kalundborg GF&BK | 0–3 | 0–2 | — | 2–1 | 4–0 | 4–4 | 1–1 | 4–0 | 7–1 | 3–0 | 1–2 | 7–0 |
| KFUM København | 0–3 | 2–2 | 2–2 | — | 2–0 | 4–0 | 0–1 | 3–0 | 1–1 | 2–1 | 1–0 | 4–1 |
| IK Viking | 0–6 | 1–2 | 2–1 | 3–2 | — | 3–0 | 3–2 | 0–5 | 2–2 | 2–1 | 4–0 | 2–2 |
| Frederiksberg BK | 3–3 | 1–1 | 1–1 | 3–1 | 3–5 | — | 3–2 | 5–3 | 2–1 | 2–1 | 3–2 | 5–1 |
| BK Rødovre | 2–2 | 0–1 | 0–2 | 0–2 | 2–4 | 2–2 | — | 0–1 | 1–0 | 0–0 | 3–0 | 0–1 |
| Holte IF | 1–2 | 1–2 | 0–2 | 0–1 | 1–2 | 1–1 | 2–0 | — | 1–0 | 3–0 | 1–0 | 6–3 |
| BK Dalgas | 1–2 | 3–0 | 0–4 | 2–3 | 3–1 | 1–1 | 1–3 | 5–1 | — | 1–1 | 4–0 | 9–0 |
| Brønderslev IF | 0–0 | 0–2 | 0–4 | 0–0 | 1–2 | 0–0 | 1–0 | 1–2 | 1–0 | — | 0–1 | 5–1 |
| B 1921 | 1–3 | 2–4 | 2–5 | 1–5 | 0–3 | 3–3 | 0–5 | 2–1 | 2–0 | 2–2 | — | 4–2 |
| Assens G&IK | 2–1 | 1–2 | 1–1 | 1–5 | 1–2 | 2–4 | 1–2 | 4–1 | 2–2 | 0–1 | 4–3 | — |

Legend: Blue = home team win; Yellow = draw; Red = away team win.

== Statistics ==
=== Scoring ===
==== Top scorers ====
| Rank | Player | Club | Goals |
|---|---|---|---|
| 1 | (Denmark) Bjarne Hinrichsen | Frederiksberg BK | 21 |
| 2 | (Denmark) Keld Møller | IK Viking | 20 |
| 3 | (Denmark) Ib Petersen | BK Fremad Amager | 18 |
| 4 | (Denmark) Jens Bessermann | KFUM København | 15 |
| 5 | (Denmark) Jørn Rasmussen | Kalundborg GF&BK | 10 |
| 5 | (Denmark) Flemming Mortensen | Kalundborg GF&BK | 10 |
| 7 | (Denmark) Gunnar Petersen | Kalundborg GF&BK | 9 |
| 7 | (Denmark) Torben Lübker | IF Fuglebakken | 9 |
| 7 | (Denmark) Torben Nielsen | IF Fuglebakken | 9 |
| 7 | (Denmark) Ole Andreasen | BK Dalgas | 9 |
| 11 | (Denmark) Svendborg Andersen | IK Viking | 8 |
| 11 | (Denmark) Peter Sloth | Holte IF | 8 |
| 11 | (Denmark) Helge Dessler | Assens G&IK | 8 |
| 11 | (Denmark) Peter Hansen | BK Fremad Amager | 8 |

==== Hat-tricks ====
| Player | For | Against | Result | Date | Ref |
|---|---|---|---|---|---|
| (Denmark) Ole Andreasen | BK Dalgas | IF Fuglebakken | 3–0 (H) | 19 April 1964 | |
| (Denmark) Kaj Pedersen | Brønderslev IF | Assens G&IK | 5–1 (H) | 19 April 1964 | |
| (Denmark) Keld Skov | IK Viking | Frederiksberg BK | 3–0 (H) | 3 May 1964 | |
| (Denmark) Kurt Sørensen | BK Dalgas | Assens G&IK | 9–0 (H) | 3 May 1964 | |
| (Denmark) John H. Petersen^{4} | BK Dalgas | Assens G&IK | 9–0 (H) | 3 May 1964 | |
| (Denmark) Egon Hansen | KFUM København | Assens G&IK | 5–1 (A) | 10 May 1964 | |
| (Denmark) Tommy Nielsen^{4} | BK Fremad Amager | B 1921 | 6–0 (H) | 9 August 1964 | |
| (Denmark) Peter Sloth | Holte IF | Brønderslev IF | 3–0 (H) | 20 September 1964 | |
| (Denmark) Bjarne Hinrichsen^{4} | Frederiksberg BK | Holte IF | 5–3 (H) | 25 October 1964 | |
| (Denmark) Gunnar Nielsen | Assens G&IK | B 1921 | 4–3 (H) | 8 November 1964 | |
| (Denmark) Ib Petersen^{4} | BK Fremad Amager | IK Viking | 6–0 (A) | 15 November 1964 | |
| (Denmark) Jens Hansen^{5} | BK Rødovre | IF Fuglebakken | 5–2 (A) | 15 November 1964 | |
| (Denmark) Gunnar Petersen | Kalundborg GF&BK | BK Dalgas | 7–1 (H) | 15 November 1964 | |

- ^{4} Player scored 4 goals
- ^{5} Player scored 5 goals

=== Discipline ===
==== Player ====
- Most warnings: 1
  - (Denmark) Jørgen Nielsen (IF Fuglebakken) on 23 August 1964 against BK Fremad Amager
  - (Denmark) Ib Petersen (BK Fremad Amager) on 25 October 1964 against BK Dalgas - the player had previously received two warnings in two other matches
- Most evictions: 1
  - (Denmark) John H. Petersen (BK Dalgas) on 15 November 1964 against Kalundborg GF&BK

==== Club ====
- Most evictions: 1
  - BK Dalgas
