= Rønne Stadion Nord =

Multi-use Stadium in Bornholm, Denmark

Coordinates: 55°06′40″N 14°42′38″E

The Rønne Stadion Nord, known for sponsorship reasons as the ØBM Arena, is a multi-use stadium at Torneværksvej 1 in Rønne on Bornholm, Denmark. It is the home ground of R.I.K. Fodbold Bornholm and is used by the Bornholm national football team and other local clubs; the naming-rights agreement with Øens Byg & Montage was announced in 2023 for an initial three-year term.
