= 2022–23 Danish 2nd Division =

32nd season of Danish 2nd Division

Danish 2nd Division
- Season: 2022–23
- Dates: Regular season: 6 August 2022 – 10 April 2023; Play-offs: 15 April 2023 – 17 June 2023
- Champions: Kolding IF (1st title)
- Promoted: Kolding IF; B.93
- Relegated: BK Frem; Jammerbugt FC (expelled)
- Matches: 382
- Goals: 559 (1.46 per match)
- Top goalscorer: Frederik Ellegaard (18 goals)
- Biggest home win: AB 5–0 BK Frem (26 August 2022)
- Biggest away win: Thisted FC 0–4 Aarhus Fremad (7 August 2022); Skive IK 0–4 Kolding IF (4 November 2022)
- Highest scoring: FC Roskilde 4–6 Aarhus Fremad (3 September 2022)
- Highest attendance: 7,255; Esbjerg fB 1–2 B.93
- Lowest attendance: 0 (various)
- Average attendance: 582

The 2022–23 Danish 2nd Division was the 32nd season of the Danish 2nd Division since its establishment in 1991. The season started on 6 August 2022 with a group of twelve teams. After 22 rounds the group was split in a promotion group and a relegation group. The top two teams of the promotion group were promoted to the 2023–24 Danish 1st Division.

== Participants ==
Esbjerg fB and Jammerbugt FC finished the 2020–21 season of the Danish 1st Division in 11th and 12th place, respectively, and were relegated to the 2nd Division. They replaced Næstved BK and Hillerød Fodbold, who were promoted to the 2022–23 Danish 1st Division.

=== Stadia and locations ===
Locations of the 2022–23 Danish 2nd Division teams. Copenhagen teams: Akademisk Boldklub, B.93, BK Frem and HIK

Club	Location	Stadium	Turf	Capacity	2021–22 position
Aarhus Fremad	Aarhus	Riisvangen Stadium	Natural	5,000	7th
Akademisk Boldklub	Gladsaxe	Gladsaxe Stadium	Natural	13,800	5th
B.93	Copenhagen	Østerbro Stadium	Natural	7,000	4th
Brabrand IF	Brabrand	Brabrand Stadion	Natural	1,000	10th
Esbjerg fB	Esbjerg	Blue Water Arena	Natural	18,000	1D, 11th
Frem	Copenhagen	Valby Idrætspark	Natural	12,000	3D, 2nd
HIK	Hellerup	Gentofte Sportspark	Natural	15,000	6th
Jammerbugt FC	Pandrup	Jetsmark Stadion	Natural	6,000	1D, 12tn
Kolding IF	Kolding	Autocentralen Park	Natural	10,000	8th
FC Roskilde	Roskilde	Roskilde Idrætspark	Natural	6,000	3D, 1st
Skive IK	Skive	SPAR Nord Arena	Natural	10,000	9th
Thisted FC	Thisted	Sparekassen Thy Arena	Natural	3,000	3rd

== League table ==
Pos	Team	Pld	W	D	L	GF	GA	GD	Pts	Promotion or Relegation
1	B.93	22	16	2	4	47	24	+23	50	Qualification to Promotion Group
2	Aarhus Fremad	22	14	6	2	47	19	+28	48	Qualification to Promotion Group
3	Kolding IF	22	14	5	3	44	18	+26	47	Qualification to Promotion Group
4	Esbjerg fB	22	13	4	5	42	23	+19	43	Qualification to Promotion Group
5	AB Gladsaxe	22	12	6	4	51	28	+23	42	Qualification to Promotion Group
6	Thisted FC	22	8	4	10	26	31	−5	28	Qualification to Promotion Group
7	Brabrand IF	22	7	5	10	24	33	−9	26	Qualification to Relegation Group
8	HIK	22	7	3	12	25	41	−16	24	Qualification to Relegation Group
9	Skive IK	22	5	8	9	27	35	−8	23	Qualification to Relegation Group
10	FC Roskilde	22	5	6	11	31	34	−3	21	Qualification to Relegation Group
11	Frem	22	3	7	12	23	38	−15	16	Qualification to Relegation Group
12	Jammerbugt FC	22	0	0	22	1	64	−63	0	Forced relegation to Tier 6 (Three rounds played)

Updated to match(es) played on 10 April 2023. Source: Danish FA
Rules for classification: 1) points; 2) goal difference; 3) number of goals scored

== Promotion Group ==
The top 6 teams will compete for 2 spots in the 2023–24 Danish 1st Division. Points and goals carried over in full from the regular season.

Pos	Team	Pld	W	D	L	GF	GA	GD	Pts	Qualification or relegation	KOL	B93	AAF	ESB	ABG	THI
1	Kolding IF (P)	32	21	6	5	64	25	+39	69	Promotion to 1st Division	—	1–1	0–2	3–0	1–0	1–0
2	B.93 (P)	32	20	6	6	63	38	+25	66	Promotion to 1st Division	1–5	—	2–1	1–2	3–3	1–1
3	Aarhus Fremad	32	19	6	7	64	35	+29	63		1–3	0–2	—	1–3	5–2	2–1
4	Esbjerg fB	32	19	5	8	59	36	+23	62		1–0	1–2	3–1	—	0–2	2–1
5	AB Gladsaxe	32	13	9	10	63	51	+12	48		1–3	0–3	0–3	1–1	—	2–2
6	Thisted FC	32	9	7	16	34	48	−14	34		0–3	0–0	0–1	1–4	2–1	—

Updated to match(es) played on 17 June 2023. Source: Danish Football Association (in Danish), Soccerway
Rules for classification: 1) Points; 2) Goal difference; 3) Goals scored; 4) Away goals scored; 5) Play-off (played on neutral ground if determining teams for different rounds); 6) Draw. ]
(P) Promoted

== Relegation Group ==
The bottom 6 teams will compete to avoid the 2 relegations spots to the 2023–24 Danish 3rd Division. Points and goals carried over in full from the regular season.

Pos	Team	Pld	W	D	L	GF	GA	GD	Pts	Qualification	ROS	BRA	HIK	SKI	FRE	JAM
1	FC Roskilde	32	13	8	11	52	39	+13	47		—	1–0	1–0	1–1	3–0	3–0
2	Brabrand IF	32	11	8	13	39	45	−6	41		1–1	—	1–0	2–2	2–1	3–0
3	HIK	32	12	4	16	43	49	−6	40		0–1	1–3	—	1–2	4–0	3–0
4	Skive IK	32	9	10	13	43	50	−7	37		1–2	3–1	0–2	—	1–3	3–0
5	Frem (R)	32	7	9	16	41	56	−15	30	3rd Division	2–5	1–1	2–2	3–0	—	3–0
6	Jammerbugt FC (R)	32	0	0	32	1	94	−93	0	Jutland Series (Tier 6)	0–3	0–3	0–3	0–3	0–3	—

Updated to match(es) played on 17 June 2023. Source: Danish Football Association (in Danish), Soccerway
Rules for classification: 1) Points; 2) Goal difference; 3) Goals scored; 4) Away goals scored; 5) Play-off (played on neutral ground if determining teams for different rounds); 6) Draw. ]
(R) Relegated
