= KFUM Roskilde =

Danish football club

- Full name: KFUM's Boldklub Roskilde
- Founded: 14 May 1929; 96 years ago
- Ground: Lillevang
- Chairman: Allan Markussen
- Manager: Jesper Pedersen
- League: Denmark Series (V)
- 2021–22: 3rd Division, 9th of 12 (relegated)
- Website: http://www.roskilde-kfum.dk/
Home colours

KFUM's Boldklub Roskilde is an association football club based in the town of Roskilde, Denmark, that competes in the Denmark Series, the fifth tier of the Danish football league system. Founded in 1929, it is affiliated to DBU Zealand. The team plays its home matches at Lillevang Idrætscenter where it has been based since 1979. The club reached promotion to the third tier in the 2019–20 season for the first time in club history after a 1–0 win over Ledøje-Smørum.

== History ==
=== Early decades ===
KFUM's Boldklub Roskilde was founded on 14 May 1929, with its first chairman becoming A. Møller. The club grew quickly, and had four teams by 1931. In 1942, the first team won DBU Zealand's B-række, the second highest regional level. However, due to World War II, less football was played during the coming years.

In 1957, Roskilde KFUM became champions of the A-række, the highest regional tier, reaching promotion to the national leagues for the first time in club history.

In 1976, construction of a new home ground began. The stadium, Lillevang Idrætscenter, was completed by 1979 and was initiated in the year of the club's 50th anniversary.

=== Recent history and 2020 promotion ===
In recent decades, Roskilde KFUM has become established in the Denmark Series, the fourth highest tier in the Danish football league system. In 2007, the club became an affiliated team of Brøndby IF from the Danish Superliga. Brøndby chairman, Per Bjerregaard subsequently stated, that Roskilde KFUM had proven that they "had a skilled academy, which had supplied players to some of the best clubs in the Superliga". Furthermore, he said that "Roskilde KFUM is a club from which we can benefit both in the short and long term by working more closely together." In 2013, KFUM beat Brøndby 2–1 in a pre-season friendly at home in front of more than 1,000 spectators. The most famous product of the Roskilde KFUM academy is Danish international Frederik Sørensen, who has played for Juventus and 1. FC Köln. Due to his success abroad, the club has several times received solidarity payments as part of the UEFA Financial Fair Play Regulations.

In December 2019, a DKK 9 million plan for installing pitches with artificial turf was initiated by Roskilde Municipality, giving KFUM's home ground an extra pitch from 2020 and onwards.

KFUM Roskilde reached promotion to the Danish 2nd Division, the third tier of the Danish football league system, for the first time in club history during the 2019–20 season after the Danish FA had implemented an expansion of the division from 2021. The promotion was secured on 20 June 2020 after a 1–0 win over Ledøje-Smørum after a first-half goal by Rasmus Tangvig.

== Honours and accolades ==
=== Domestic ===
==== National leagues ====
- Fourth Highest Danish League^{4}
  - Group 1 Winners (1): 2019–20^{‡}

==== Regional leagues ====
- Sjællandsserien^{5}
  - Winners (2): 2003, 2012–13
- SBU Serie 1^{6}
  - Winners (2): 1974, 2011

==== Cups ====
- DBU Pokalen
  - Third round (1): 2015–16
- SBUs Seriepokal
  - Runners-up (1): 1967

- ^{4}: Level 4: Kvalifikationsturneringen (1946–1965), Danmarksserien for herrer (1966–present)
- ^{5}: Level 5 (Level 1 under DBU Zealand): Sjællandsmesterskabet (1902–1927), SBUs Mesterrække (1927–1945), Sjællandsserien (1945–present)
- ^{6}: Level 6 (Level 2 under DBU Zealand): DBU Sjælland Serie 1
