= Karlslunde IF =

Danish football club

- Full name: Karlslunde Idrætsforening
- Founded: 26 May 1914; 111 years ago
- Ground: Karlslunde Stadion, Karlslunde, Greve Municipality, Denmark
- Capacity: 1,500
- League: Denmark Series (V)
- Website: http://www.karlslundefodbold.dk/
Home colours

Karlslunde IF is a Danish association football club from Karlslunde, Greve Municipality. The football team is part of a sports club with approximately 900 members, and departments for badminton, table tennis, gymnastics, and shooting sports, as well as other activities.

The football department was founded in 1914, when it was established as a department within the club "Carlslunde-Carlstrup Skyttelag" from 1866.

To the 2025-26 season Karlslunde IF and Greve IF merged their respectively top tier teams to form FC Sydkysten.
