= 2021–22 Danish 1st Division =

82nd season of Danish 1st Division

NordicBet Liga
- Season: 2021–22
- Champions: AC Horsens; 2nd Danish 1st Division title
- Promoted: AC Horsens; Lyngby
- Relegated: Esbjerg fB; Jammerbugt
- Matches: 192
- Goals: 574 (2.99 per match)
- Top goalscorer: Mathias Kristensen (Nykøbing) (18 goals)
- Biggest home win: Lyngby 5–0 Esbjerg fB (7 August 2021); Hobro 5–0 Fremad Amager (1 October 2021); AC Horsens 6–1 Fremad Amager (7 November 2021)
- Biggest away win: Jammerbugt 0–6; Helsingør (28 August 2021)
- Highest scoring: Nykøbing 4–4 Fredericia (1 August 2021); Hobro 2–6 Esbjerg fB (29 October 2021)
- Highest attendance: 4,426; Lyngby 0–0 Helsingør (29 October 2021)
- Lowest attendance: 187; Jammerbugt 1–1 Fremad Amager (19 February 2022)
- Average attendance: 1,207

The 2021–22 Danish 1st Division (known as the NordicBet Liga due to sponsorship by NordicBet) marked the 26th season of the league operating as the second tier of Danish football and the 82nd season overall under the 1st Division name. The league is governed by the Danish Football Association (DBU).

== Participants ==
Lyngby Boldklub and AC Horsens finished the 2020–21 season of the Superliga in 11th and 12th place, respectively, and were relegated to the 1st Division. They replaced Viborg FF and Silkeborg IF, who were promoted to the 2021–22 Danish Superliga.

Nykøbing FC and Jammerbugt FC won promotion from the 2020–21 Danish 2nd Divisions. They replaced Kolding IF and Skive IK.

=== Stadia and locations ===
Locations of the 2021–22 Danish 1st Division teams.

Club	Location	Stadium	Turf	Capacity	2020–21 position
AC Horsens	Horsens	CASA Arena Horsens	Natural	10,400	Superliga, 12th
Esbjerg fB	Esbjerg	Blue Water Arena	Natural	18,000	3rd
FC Fredericia	Fredericia	Monjasa Park	Natural	4,000	5th
FC Helsingør	Helsingør	Helsingør Stadion	Natural	4,500	4th
BK Fremad Amager	Copenhagen	Sundby Idrætspark	Artificial	7,200	8th
HB Køge	Herfølge/Køge	Capelli Sport Stadion	Artificial	4,000	6th
Hobro IK	Hobro	DS Arena	Natural	10,700	9th
Hvidovre IF	Hvidovre	Hvidovre Stadion	Natural	12,000	7th
Jammerbugt FC	Pandrup	Jetsmark Stadion	Natural	6,000	2D, 1st
Lyngby	Kongens Lyngby	Lyngby Stadium	Natural	8,000	Superliga, 11th
Nykøbing FC	Nykøbing Falster	CM Arena	Natural	10,000	2D, 1st
Vendsyssel FF	Hjørring	Hjørring Stadion	Natural	7,500	10th

=== Personnel and sponsoring ===
Note: Flags indicate national team as has been defined under FIFA eligibility rules. Players and Managers may hold more than one non-FIFA nationality.

Team	Head coach	Captain	Kit manufacturer	Shirt sponsor
AC Horsens	(Denmark) Jens Berthel Askou	(Denmark) Janus Drachmann	Hummel	NG ZINK A/S
Esbjerg fB	(Denmark) Steffen Ernemann (caretaker)	(Denmark) Mads Larsen	Nike	Viking
FC Fredericia	(Denmark) Michael Hansen	(Denmark) Christian Ege Nielsen	Hummel	Monjasa
FC Helsingør	(Denmark) Morten Eskesen	(Denmark) Nikolaj Hansen	Diadora	GardinXperten
BK Fremad Amager	(Denmark) Peter Løvenkrands	(Denmark) Kristoffer Munksgaard	Adidas	Øens Erhvervsnetværk
HB Køge	(Denmark) Daniel Agger	(Guinea-Bissau) Eddi Gomes	Capelli	Castus
Hobro IK	(Denmark) Martin Thomsen	(Denmark) Jonas Damborg	Puma	DS Gruppen, Spar Nord
Hvidovre IF	(Denmark) Per Frandsen	(Denmark) Christopher Østberg	Nike	KBS Byg
Jammerbugt FC	(Germany) Nabil Trabelsi	(Denmark) Christian Rye	Hummel	Sparekassen Vendsyssel
Lyngby Boldklub	(Iceland) Freyr Alexandersson	(Denmark) Kasper Enghardt	Adidas	Jetbull
Nykøbing FC	(Denmark) Claus Jensen	(Denmark) Lars Pleidrup	Nike	Jyske Bank
Vendsyssel FF	(Denmark) Henrik Pedersen	(Denmark) Mikkel Wohlgemuth	Diadora	Nordjyske Bank

=== Managerial changes ===
Team	Outgoing manager	Manner of departure	Date of vacancy	Replaced by	Date of appointment	Position in table
HB Køge	(Lithuania) Aurelijus Skarbalius	Made Global Director	31 May 2021	(Denmark) Daniel Agger	1 June 2021	Pre-Season
Hobro IK	(Denmark) Michael Kryger	Mutual consent	31 May 2021	(Denmark) Martin Thomsen	11 June 2021	Pre-Season
Lyngby Boldklub	(Denmark) Carit Falch	Signed by Vejle Boldklub	8 June 2021	(Iceland) Freyr Alexandersson	22 June 2021	Pre-Season
Vendsyssel FF	(Denmark) Michael Schjønberg	Resigned	26 June 2021	(Denmark) Henrik Pedersen	2 July 2021	Pre-Season
Esbjerg fB	(Denmark) Lars Vind	End of tenure as caretaker	30 June 2021	(Germany) Peter Hyballa	1 July 2021	Pre-Season
Fremad Amager	(Denmark) Jesper Christiansen	End of tenure as caretaker	30 June 2021	(Denmark) Peter Løvenkrands	1 July 2021	Pre-Season
Esbjerg fB	(Germany) Peter Hyballa	Resigned	11 August 2021	(Germany) Roland Vrabec	11 August 2021	11th
Jammerbugt FC	(Denmark) Bo Zinck	Made Head of Sports	31 December 2021	(Germany) Nabil Trabelsi	1 January 2022	10th
Esbjerg fB	(Germany) Roland Vrabec	Sacked	9 March 2022	(Denmark) Michael Kryger	30 March 2022	9th
Esbjerg fB	(Denmark) Michael Kryger	Resigned	20 April 2022	(Denmark) Steffen Ernemann (caretaker)	20 April 2022	10th

== League table ==
Pos	Team	Pld	W	D	L	GF	GA	GD	Pts	Promotion or Relegation
1	FC Helsingør	22	15	6	1	52	20	+32	51	Qualification to Promotion Group
2	Lyngby Boldklub	22	12	7	3	45	21	+24	43	Qualification to Promotion Group
3	Hvidovre IF	22	13	4	5	37	22	+15	43	Qualification to Promotion Group
4	AC Horsens	22	12	4	6	37	21	+16	40	Qualification to Promotion Group
5	FC Fredericia	22	11	4	7	38	36	+2	37	Qualification to Promotion Group
6	Nykøbing FC	22	7	4	11	35	37	−2	25	Qualification to Promotion Group
7	HB Køge	22	6	7	9	28	32	−4	25	Qualification to Relegation Group
8	Vendsyssel FF	22	5	9	8	25	31	−6	24	Qualification to Relegation Group
9	Hobro IK	22	5	7	10	31	38	−7	22	Qualification to Relegation Group
10	Esbjerg fB	22	5	5	12	24	38	−14	20	Qualification to Relegation Group
11	Fremad Amager	22	5	3	14	24	48	−24	18	Qualification to Relegation Group
12	Jammerbugt FC	22	4	4	14	19	48	−29	16	Qualification to Relegation Group

Updated to match(es) played on 18 March 2022. Source: Danish FA
Rules for classification: 1) points; 2) goal difference; 3) number of goals scored

=== Positions by round ===
Team ╲ Round	1	2	3	4	5	6	7	8	9	10	11	12	13	14	15	16	17	18	19	20	21	22
FC Helsingør	4	1	2	2	3	2	1	1	1	1	1	1	1	2	1	1	1	1	1	1	1	1
Lyngby Boldklub	3	2	1	1	1	1	3	3	4	2	2	2	2	1	3	2	2	3	2	2	2	2
Hvidovre IF	5	3	3	4	4	4	4	4	3	5	5	4	4	4	2	4	3	2	3	3	3	3
AC Horsens	11	5	6	6	5	5	5	5	5	4	3	5	5	5	5	5	5	4	4	4	4	4
FC Fredericia	1	4	4	3	2	3	2	2	2	3	4	3	3	3	4	3	4	5	5	5	5	5
Nykøbing FC	9	8	8	5	6	6	6	6	6	6	6	6	6	6	6	6	6	6	7	7	6	6
HB Køge	1	6	5	7	8	9	8	11	9	8	9	7	8	7	8	7	7	7	6	6	7	7
Vendsyssel FF	5	7	7	9	9	8	7	10	11	11	11	10	11	11	10	10	9	9	9	8	8	8
Hobro IK	11	11	9	10	10	10	10	12	12	12	12	11	12	12	12	11	11	12	12	10	9	9
Esbjerg fB	5	10	11	11	11	12	12	9	7	10	7	8	10	8	7	8	8	8	8	9	10	10
Fremad Amager	10	12	12	12	12	11	11	8	10	9	10	12	9	10	11	12	12	11	10	11	11	11
Jammerbugt FC	5	9	10	8	7	7	9	7	8	7	8	9	7	9	9	9	10	10	11	12	12	12

Updated to match(es) played on 18 March 2022. Source: Worldfootball

== Promotion Group ==
The top 6 teams will compete for 2 spots in the 2022–23 Danish Superliga. Points and goals carried over in full from the regular season. Champions AC Horsens and Lyngby Boldklub won promotion to the Superliga.

Pos	Team	Pld	W	D	L	GF	GA	GD	Pts	Qualification or relegation	HOR	LYN	HVI	HEL	FRE	NYK
1	AC Horsens (P)	32	19	7	6	55	29	+26	64	Promotion to Danish Superliga	—	2–1	1–1	3–3	0–0	3–2
2	Lyngby Boldklub (P)	32	18	9	5	62	29	+33	63	Promotion to Danish Superliga	1–2	—	1–0	2–1	1–0	5–0
3	Hvidovre IF	32	17	6	9	49	31	+18	57		0–1	0–0	—	2–0	3–1	2–0
4	FC Helsingør	32	16	7	9	65	44	+21	55		0–1	1–2	1–2	—	2–1	2–3
5	FC Fredericia	32	15	5	12	55	53	+2	50		0–4	1–3	2–1	4–0	—	5–1
6	Nykøbing FC	32	10	5	17	50	63	−13	35		0–1	1–1	2–1	4–3	2–3	—

Updated to match(es) played on 29 May 2022. Source: Danish Football Association (in Danish), Soccerway
Legend: Blue = home team win; Yellow = draw; Red = away team win.
Rules for classification: 1) Points; 2) Goal difference; 3) Goals scored; 4) Away goals scored; 5) Play-off (played on neutral ground if determining teams for different rounds); 6) Draw. ]
(P) Promoted

== Relegation Group ==
The bottom 6 teams will compete to avoid the 2 relegations spots to the 2022–23 Danish 2nd Division. Esbjerg fB and Jammerbugt FC, which came in last place, were relegated to the 2nd Division. Points and goals carried over in full from the regular season.

Pos	Team	Pld	W	D	L	GF	GA	GD	Pts	Qualification or relegation	HBK	HOB	VEN	AMA	ESB	JAM
1	HB Køge	32	10	12	10	45	41	+4	42		—	4–4	3–0	1–1	2–1	2–0
2	Hobro IK	32	9	12	11	47	50	−3	39		1–1	—	2–0	1–1	1–2	1–0
3	Vendsyssel FF	32	8	12	12	39	44	−5	36		1–1	0–1	—	2–0	0–0	4–1
4	Fremad Amager	32	9	6	17	39	62	−23	33		1–0	0–0	1–4	—	2–0	4–1
5	Esbjerg fB (R)	32	6	10	16	36	54	−18	28	Relegation to Danish 2nd Division	0–0	2–2	2–2	2–3	—	2–2
6	Jammerbugt FC (R)	32	7	5	20	32	74	−42	26	Relegation to Danish 2nd Division	0–3	2–3	2–1	3–2	2–1	—

Updated to match(es) played on 28 May 2022. Source: Danish Football Association (in Danish), Soccerway
Legend: Blue = home team win; Yellow = draw; Red = away team win.
Rules for classification: 1) Points; 2) Goal difference; 3) Goals scored; 4) Away goals scored; 5) Play-off (played on neutral ground if determining teams for different rounds); 6) Draw. ]
(R) Relegated
