= FC Amager =

Danish football club

- Full name: Football Club Amager
- Short name: FCA
- Founded: 1 July 2008
- Dissolved: 30 March 2009
- Ground: Sundby Idrætspark, Copenhagen
- Capacity: 7,200
- Chairman: Todi Jónsson
- Manager: Michael Madsen
- League: Danish 1st Division
Home colours	Away colours

FC Amager (or FCA) was a Danish football club, formed on 1 July 2008, which declared itself bankrupt on 30 March 2009. FC Amager was a merger between football clubs Boldklubben Fremad Amager, Kløvermarkens Forenede Boldklubber and Amager Fodbold Forening. The team played its home games at Sundby Idrætspark.

== Big visions ==
The vision for the Amager merger was announced at a press conference at Fremad Amager headquarters on Tuesday 20 March 2007 by Faroese footballer and future club owner, Todi Jónsson; real estate agent, sponsor and member of the Fremad Amager board, Hanne Nørrisgaard; new sponsor Eik Bank representative, Claus Bodenhoff; and former Fremad Amager chairman Karsten Østergaard. The primary goal of FC Amager was promotion to the Danish Superliga by the 2010/2011 season at the latest and to function as a football academy for young promising footballers from the Faroe Islands and Amager. The plan was for the football academy to house 20–25 young players from the Faroe Islands and other small nations.

The press conference was followed by another press conference on 26 March in Tórshavn, Faroe Islands, due to the great interest shown by the country's private sector and the investors close connections to the country.

The reason why the team did not exist before August 2008, is that the deficit of 3 million DKK in Fremad Amager had to be paid out by the former majority share holder before the Dansk Boldspil-Union deadline of submission on 31 March 2007. As it was not realistic to keep the original plans of playing from 2007, it was decided to postpone the merge for one year. Furthermore, none of the participating clubs had the organisation or facilities needed to secure promotion to the Superliga.

== Background ==
Before the press conference, the merge and new professional team was known under different work titles: 'Amager FC' (a different football club already exists under this name), 'Øens Hold' (English: The Islass Team, not to be mistaken with Odense Boldklub and the cooperation between Funenian clubs) and finally plain 'Amager' (a joint team for promising youngsters from Amager) and had been underway since the summer of 2005.

However, the plans did not proceed before a group consisting of four Faroese investors under the name of Fremad Amager Invest A/S and with the footballer Todi Jónsson as the front man, at an extraordinary press general assembly on 15 March 2007, took over the majority of the shares (51.7%) of Fremad Amager.

The other investors in the new company were composed by an investment group from the Faroe Islands and two investors from the Copenhagen IT-business, and had a starting capital of 1.5 million DKK. The previous majority stockholder, controversial real estate agent Hanne Nørrisgaard, represented a third of the shares. According to Todi Jónsson, the plans to take over a club in Denmark to use for Faroese players started two years prior to the takeover, with concrete dialogue with Fremad Amager starting 1.5 years prior to the takeover.

Kastrup Boldklub were to have joined the merger, but due to their engagement in Amager United and the conflicts in getting out of that arrangement, including the court trial against Amager United Aps in connection with the break-up, the club chairman, Søren Mogensen, stated that this would not happen.

It was expected that Kastrup Boldklub would join the merger at a later stage, as the club was one of the two original promoters of the Øens Hold-project. The question of joining FC Amager was raised at a general assembly with a positive result, and the promoters and investors of FC Amager had stated that there was an open invitation to all football clubs on Amager to join the new team.

The last attempt to join the football clubs of Amager and create a competitive professional team with Superliga ambitions came at the initiative of a number of people in Kastrup Boldklub and Fremad Amager, when it was realized that no Amager club would be economically strong enough to survive in the Superliga on its own.

Fremad Amager contacted Kastrup Boldklub and Tårnby Boldklub (the two clubs behind Amager United) to discuss the possibilities of a future collaboration, to which the Kastrup Boldklub board were positive. After an informal meeting in June 2005 (XX) between Karsten Østergaard (then chairman of the amateur side of Fremad Amager and member of the board) and Gorm Thorius (then chairman of Kastrup Boldklub) as well as Søren Mortensen (then representative of Kastrup Boldklub in the board of Amager United), the group invited all 35 football clubs from Amager to a co-operation through a grand meeting on 13 October 2005. Representatives from 10 clubs showed up and expressed a wish to join non-binding discussions about future collaboration and the completion of a work document for the basis of decision for establishing of the team. Later, however, it turned out that the idea of a joint professional team did not have the backing of a number of the clubs' boards and general assemblies. After the meeting in June 2005, Gorm Thorius and Søren Mortensen left the Amager United board, due to accusations of being disloyal to the club when entering talks with Fremad Amager. The disagreements between Kastrup Boldklub and Tårnby Boldklub were to be characteristic for the future of Amager united.

On 14 November 2006, after a long debate among the members of Kastrup Boldklub the vote was 80.2% for and 19.8% against. Shortly after the general assemblies in Amager FF and Kløvermarkens FB also agreed. Fremad Amager did not need a general assembly, as the amateur part of the club had waived the right to decide over the professional part of the club when Fremad Amager became a public limited company.

Shortly after the grand meeting, Tårnby Boldklub withdrew from Øens Hold due to their engagement in Amager United. Likewise AB 70 also withdrew from the talks due to their newly won promotion to the 2nd Division, as the merge would mean a relegation of their team to Danmarksserien.

In October 2006, this was followed up by the board of B1908 which had two representatives in Øen Hold. The board did not feel that the existing document for the basis of decision was good enough to be accepted at an extraordinary general assembly. Furthermore, they could not surrender the sovereignty of the club, as they did not feel that the project was sustainable due to the lack of concrete major sponsors. Dragør Boldklub did raise the question at a general assembly on 5 December 2006, however the club was not given the mandate to participate, as only one of the members of the club voted for the project. Neither Sundby Boldklub nor Sønderbro Fight agreed to a formal collaboration.

== Logo and mascot ==
The logo of FC Amager was drawn by the Faroese communication bureau Sansir and features a pair of angel wings (from the Fremad Amager nickname), a shield with Dannebrog and the club name in abbreviated form as the central elements of the design. FC Amager's club kits will be a combination of blue and white colors.

On 21 May 2007 Amager Bladet announced a contest to find the character to represent FC Amager as a mascot. The result was to be announced at the Fremad Amager home game against Aarhus Fremad on 10 June 2007. The name of the mascot was found in a separate contest in Amager Bladet during the summer of 2007.

== Finance and bankruptcy ==
The club was immediately ambitious since its founding of summer 2008. Brian Mollerup was headhunted as a chairman after serving as Anja Andersen's right-hand for the Danish handball team, Slagelse, and director of the grocery chain SPAR. After some months in the post, Brian Mollerup made the rest of the board aware that the team's ambitions and economic situation were at odds with one another. After disagreements about the future strategy of the club, Brian Mollerup resigned from the team on 5 February 2009.

On 28 March 2009, the Director Todi Jónsson told Danish Football Association the club was filing for bankruptcy, and withdrew from 1. division only 8 months after the club was founded.
