= Christina Markus Lassen =

Danish diplomat

Her Excellency Christina Markus Lassen R.
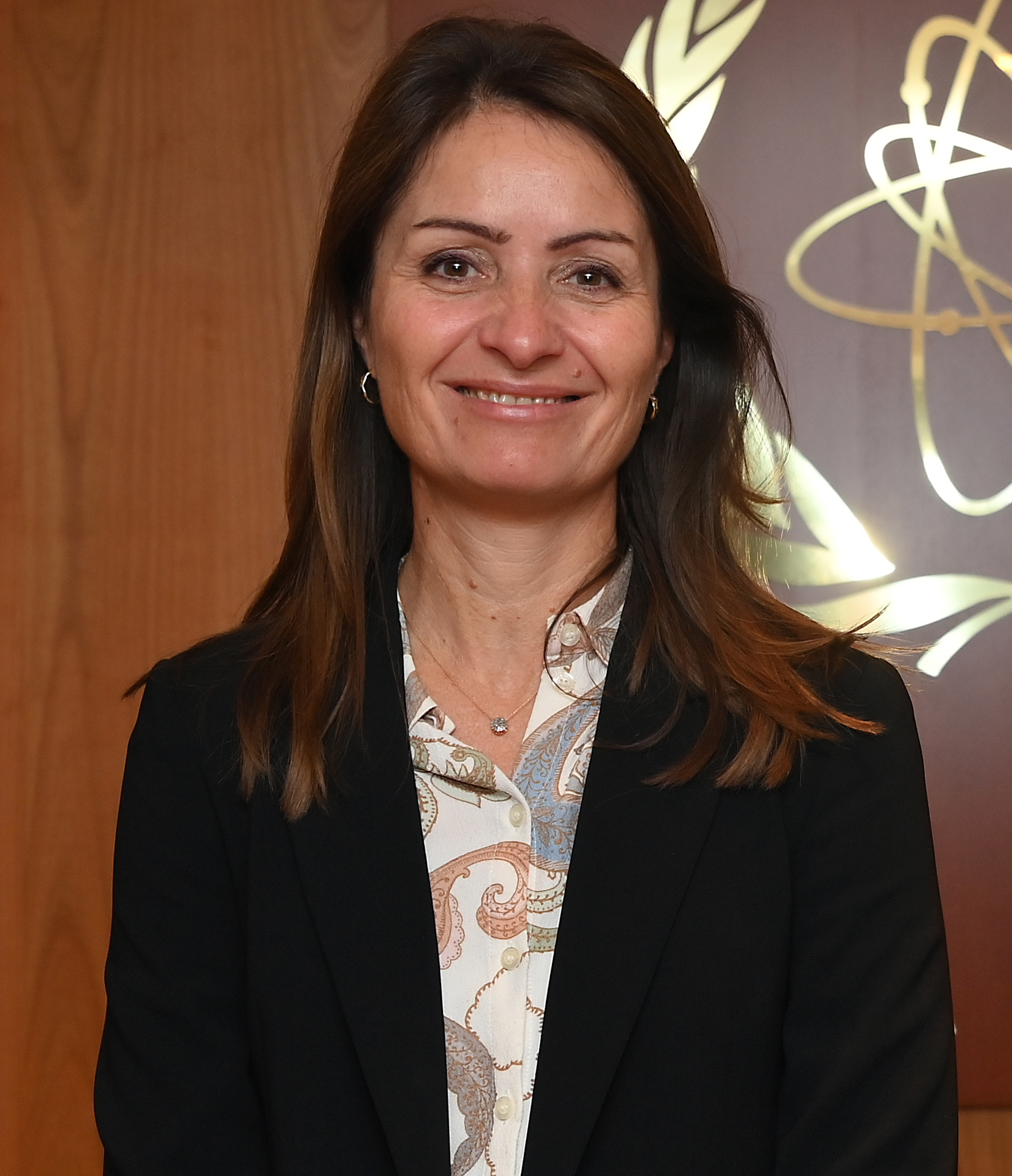
- Lassen in 2021

Permanent Representative of Denmark to the United Nations
- Incumbent
- Assumed office 1 September 2023
- Monarchs: Margrethe II; Frederik X
- Prime Minister: Mette Frederiksen
- Preceded by: Martin Bille Hermann

Ambassador of Denmark to the United States
- In office 1 September 2022 – 1 September 2023
- Monarch: Margrethe II
- Prime Minister: Mette Frederiksen
- Preceded by: Lone Dencker Wisborg
- Succeeded by: Jesper Møller Sørensen

Personal details
- Born: 17 December 1970 (age 55) Copenhagen, Denmark
- Education: Copenhagen Business School; Sorbonne University; American University; Harvard University

Christina Markus Lassen R. (born 17 December 1970) is a Danish diplomat, who has served as the Permanent representative of Denmark to the United Nations since 2023. She previously served as Ambassador of Denmark to the United States and as Under Secretary of State for Foreign Policy at the Ministry of Foreign Affairs.

In her current position as UN Ambassador in New York, Lassen is responsible for working in partnership with Denmark's special representative, Holger K. Nielsen, to advance Denmark's candidacy for a seat in the UN Security Council for the period 2025-2026. Prior to her current appointment, Lassen held diplomatic roles, including Ambassador and Head of the EU Delegation to Lebanon, and Danish Ambassador to Syria and Jordan, during a period of regional instability, including the Arab Spring and specifically the Syrian revolution in 2011.

== Early life and education ==
Christina Markus Lassen was born on 17 December 1970 in Copenhagen, Denmark.

In 1997, Lassen obtained a Master of Science in International relations and Business from Copenhagen Business School. In 1993, during her master's programme, she studied foreign policy at American University in Washington, D.C.

In 2012–13, she did a fellowship at the Weatherhead Center for International Affairs, Harvard University, conducting research on the Arab uprisings, and their implications and consequences for relations between the Arab world and the EU/US.

== Diplomatic career ==
Lassen began her career at the Ministry of Foreign Affairs in Copenhagen in 1997 as Head of Section, before becoming First Secretary in the Political Department at the Danish Embassy in Washington, D.C., from 2000 to 2004, a post she held during the September 11 terrorist attacks. She was afterwards Special Advisor to the Prime Minister's Office for Middle Eastern and Transatlantic Affairs.

In 2005, she became the Head of the Executive Secretariat of the Ministry of Foreign Affairs. In 2007, she was appointed the leader of an internal commission within the Ministry tasked with overseeing organizational restructuring. Under her leadership, the commission, composed of younger employees, developed proposals for a more flexible and horizontally structured ministry. This resulted in the dissolution of the traditional north and south groups and the establishment of multiple specialized centres.

In September 2009, Lassen assumed her first ambassadorial appointment, concurrently representing Denmark in both Syria and Jordan, from the Danish Embassy in Damascus. At the age of 38, she became the youngest woman to hold such a position in the history of the Danish Foreign Service. During the Syrian revolution, she corresponded tightly with ambassadors Robert Ford from the US, Éric Chevallier from France and Simon Collins from the UK, forming a unified 'Western' approach. She, and her embassy staff, had an "excellent network of contacts", that the Americans relied on.

In a 2020 interview with Berlingske, she reflected on her work, stating, "Since 11 September, I have spent much of my energy trying to understand what it is that separates us - what went wrong between the West and the Middle East". Her time as Ambassador to Syria was marked by the onset of the civil war in the country. She described her personal connection to the conflict, saying, "The war in Syria is very personal for me. Seeing the regime's extremely brutal response to the initially peaceful demonstrations and how violent it all quickly turned was extremely depressing".

She returned to Denmark in 2013 as the Director for Public Diplomacy and Communication at the Ministry of Foreign Affairs, a position she held until 2014, where she became the Director for Stabilization and Security Policy from 2014 to 2015.

Described as being part of the "younger generation of diplomats", Lassen's extensive tenure and positions within the Danish Foreign Service, has contributed to the Ministry's adaptation to a global agenda.

Lassen was appointed Ambassador and Head of the EU Delegation to Lebanon in 2015. During this time, she was the Diplomat in Residence at the American University in Beirut, and Fellow of the Issam Fares Institute. She attended the 2015 Bilderberg Conference as EU Ambassador to Lebanon.

In 2019, she returned to Denmark as Political Director and Under Secretary of State for Foreign Policy at the Ministry of Foreign Affairs, before becoming Ambassador of Denmark to the United States, in 2022.

During the 2023 ambassadorial reshuffle, Lassen was appointed Permanent representative of Denmark to the United Nations, tasked with spearheading the Danish candidacy for a seat on the UN Security Council in 2025. On 6 June 2024, Denmark was elected with 184 votes to the UN Security Council from the Western European and Others Group, and Lassen will thereby represent Denmark in the country's fifth turn in the Security Council for a two-year period from 2025-2026.

== Honours ==
Lassen served as the Ministry of Foreign Affairs' Representative in the Danish Institute for International Studies (DIIS) and as a Member of the advisory board at the Danish Foreign Policy Society.

=== National ===
- Denmark:
  - Knight of the Order of the Dannebrog (2007)
