= 1964 in Denmark =

- Decades: 1940s; 1950s; 1960s; 1970s; 1980s
- See also: Other events of 1964; List of years in Denmark

Events from the year 1964 in Denmark.

== Incumbents ==
- Monarch – Frederik IX
- Prime minister – Jens Otto Krag

== Events ==
- 21 March – Denmark hosts the Eurovision Song Contest and finishes in 9th place.
- 22 September – The 1964 parliamentary election is held.

== Sport ==
- January–February – Denmark participates in the 1964 Winter Olympics.
- October – Denmark participates in the 1964 Summer Olympics and wins six medals.

=== Badminton ===
- 1–4 April – All England Open Badminton Championships
  - Knud Aage Nielsen wins gold in Men's Single
  - Finn Kobberø and Jørgen Hammergaard Hansen win gold in Men's Double
  - Karin Jørgensen and Ulla Strand win gold in Women's Double

=== Football ===
- 19 April – Naja Abelsen, painter and illustrator
- 30 March – the 1964 Jutland Series is launched
- 7 May – Esbjerg fB wins the 1963–64 Danish Cup by defeating KFUMs Boldklub Odense 2–1 in the final.
- 17–20 June – Denmark participates in 1964 European Nations' Cup in France.
  - 17 June – Denmark is defeated by the Soviet Union in the semi-final.
  - 20 June – Denmark is defeated by Hungary in the bronze match.
- 15 November – the 1964 Jutland Series final is played

== Births ==
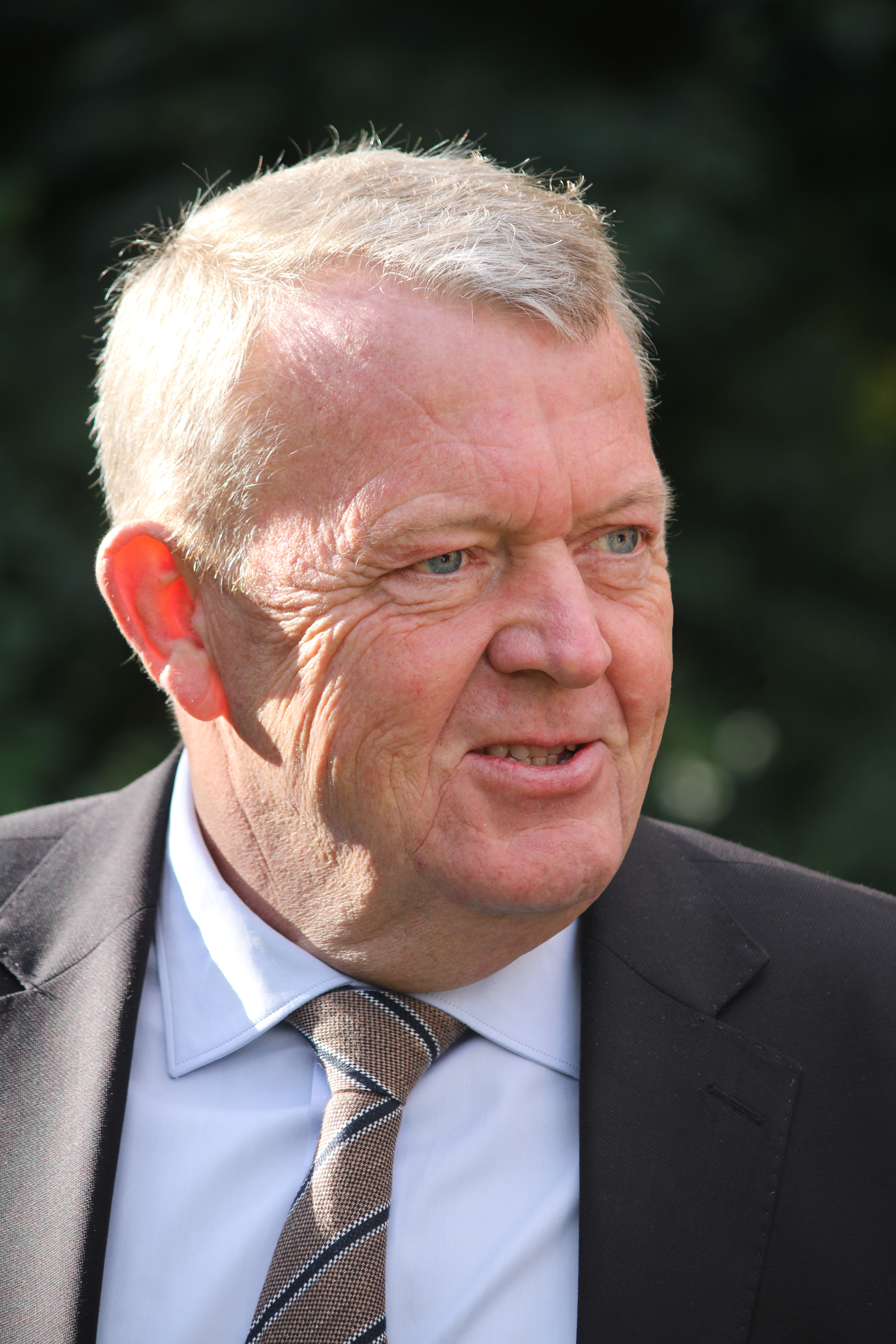
Lars Løkke Rasmussen.

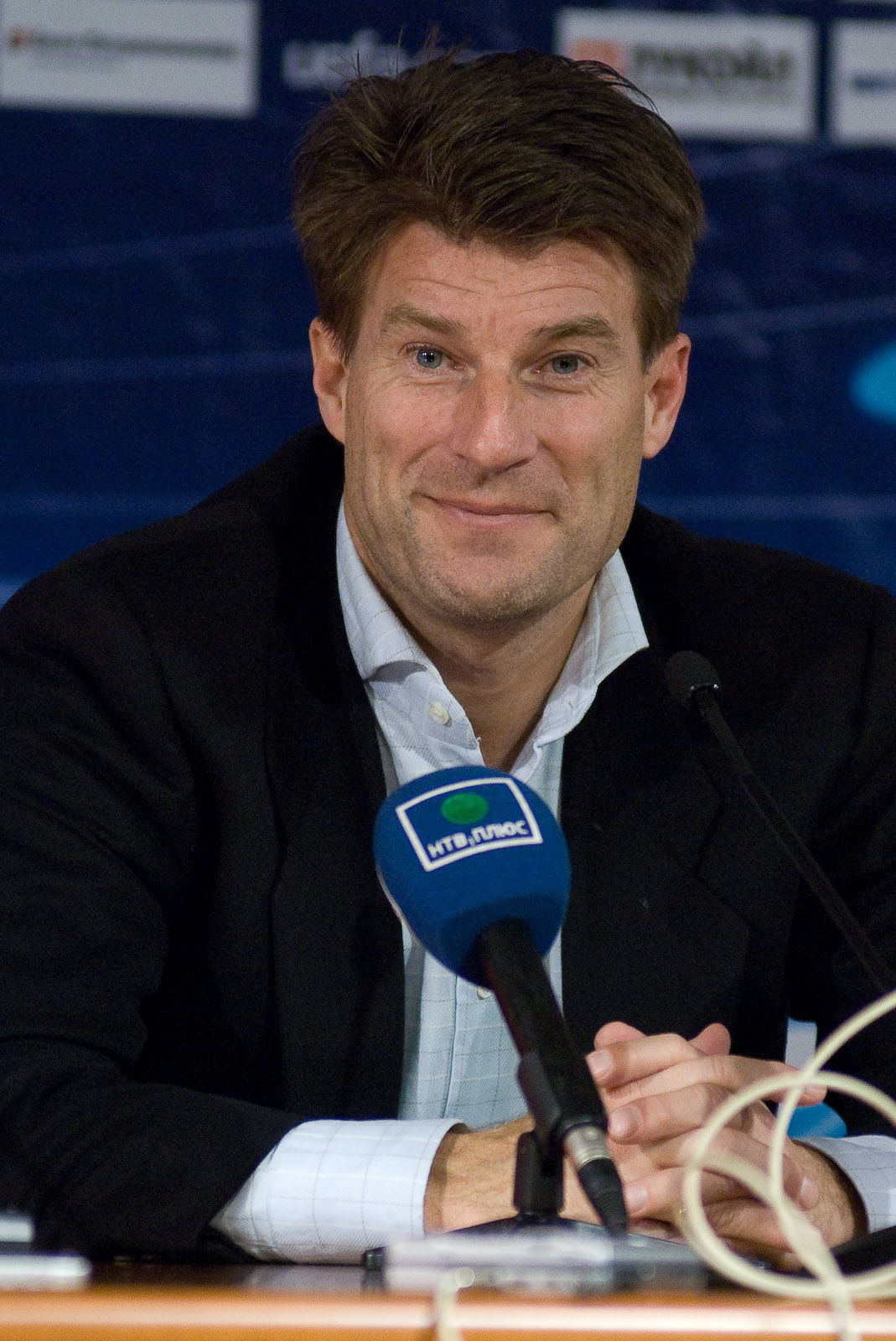
Michael Laudrup.

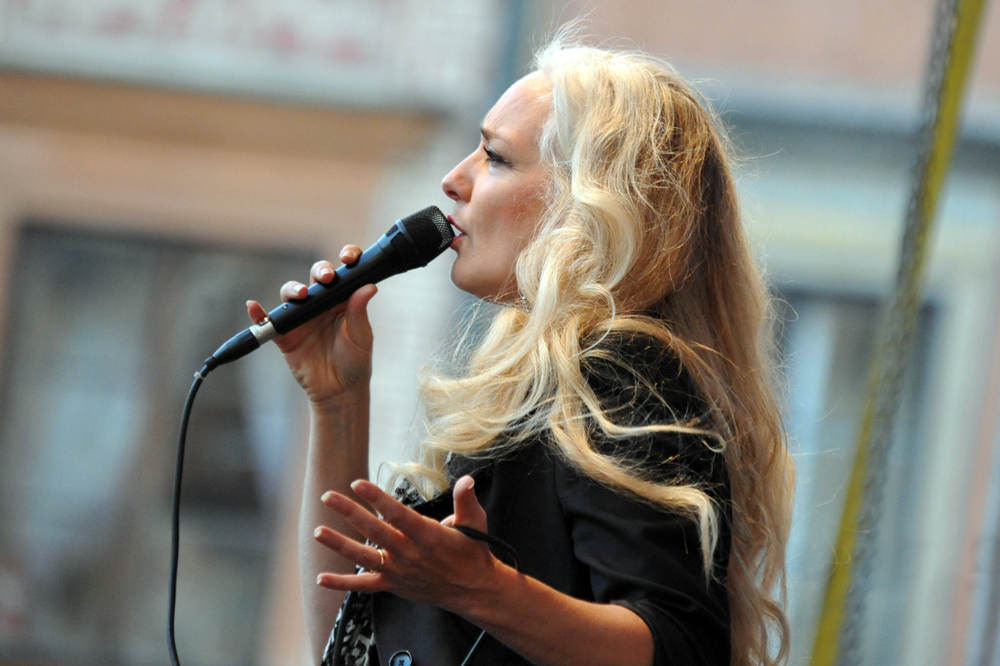
Cæcilie Norby.

=== January–March ===
- 13 January – Claus Nielsen, footballer
- 30 January – Torsten Gejl, politician
- 4 February – Marianne Gaarden, bishop
- 21 March – Jesper Skibby, cyclist

=== April–June ===
- 3 April – Bjarne Riis, cyclist
- 8 April – Janne Teller, author
- 22 April – Bo Gunge, composer
- 6 May – Lars Mikkelsen, actor
- 10 May – Mai Gehrke, mathematician
- 15 May – Lars Løkke Rasmussen, 25th Prime Minister of Denmark
- 1 June – Marianne Florman, handball player
- 15 June – Michael Laudrup, football player
- 30 June – Alexandra, Countess of Frederiksborg, Ex-wife of Prince Joachim of Denmark

=== July–September ===
- 6 August Sara Blædel, author
- 9 September – Cæcilie Norby, jazz and rock singer
- 18 September – Curt Hansen, chess grandmaster
- 25 September – Ida Jessen, author

=== October–December ===
- 11 October – Christian Dyvig, businessman
- 3 November – Paprika Steen, actress
- 11 December – Niels Christian Meyer, television host
- 20 December – Morten Løkkegaard, politician

== Deaths ==
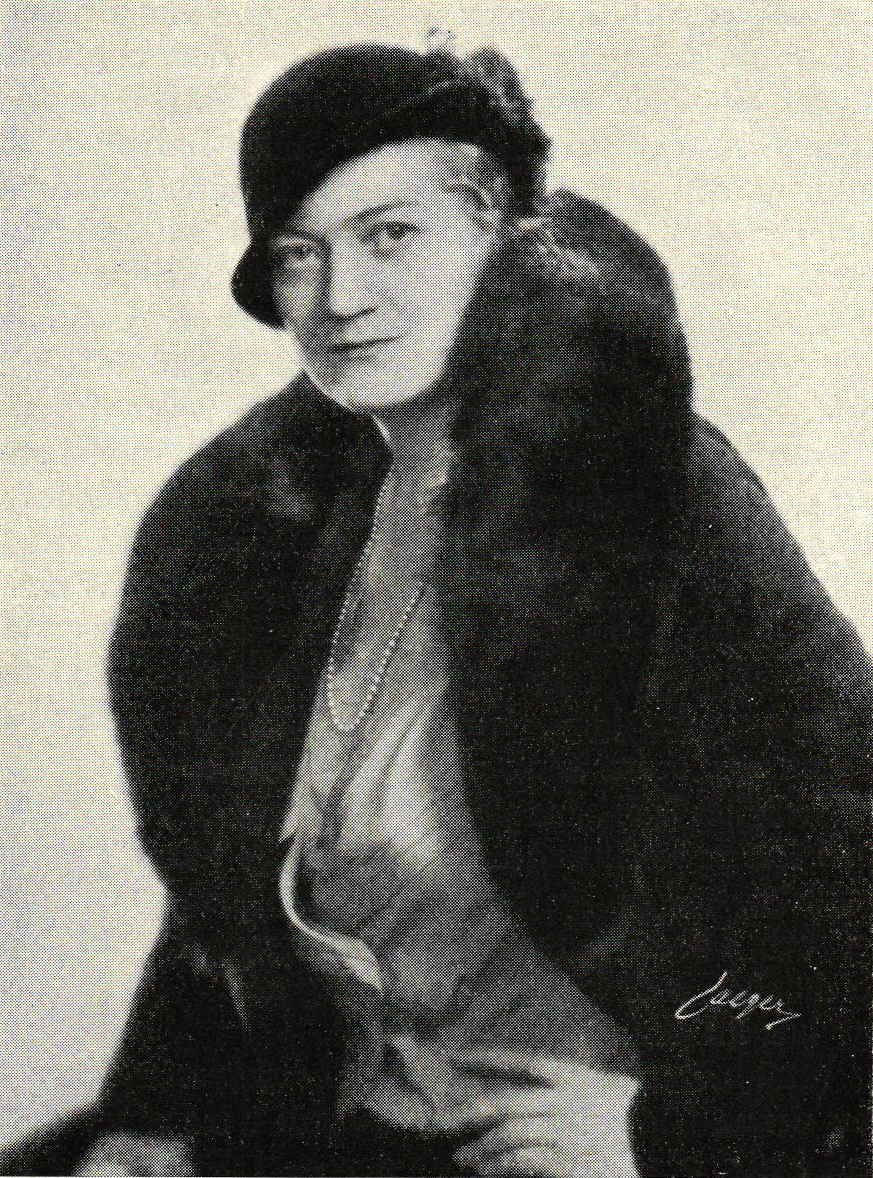
Bodil Ipsen.

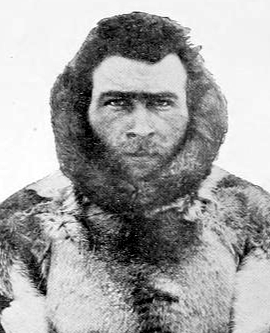
Lauge Koch.

=== January–March ===
- 1 January – Thyge Petersen, boxer (born 1902)
- 16 February – Jette Bang photographer (born 1914)
- 27 March – Emil Reesen, composer, conductor and pianist (born 1887)

=== April–June ===
- 10 May – Harald Tandrup, writer (born 1874)
- 5 June – Lauge Koch, geologist and Arctic explorer (born 1892)
- 21 May – Sigurd Kielland Brandt, painter (born 1886)

=== July–September ===
- 14 July – Prince Axel of Denmark (born 1888)
- 12 August – Jørgen Skafte Rasmussen, businessman, company founder (born 1878)
- 28 September – Arild Rosenkrantz, nobleman, painter, sculptor, stained-glass artist and illustrator (born 1870)

=== October–December ===
- 21 October – Carl Johan Hviid, actor (born 1899)
- 26 November – Bodil Ipsen, actress and film director (born 1889)

== See also ==
- 1964 in Danish television
