= Friis Arne Petersen =

Danish diplomat (born 1952)

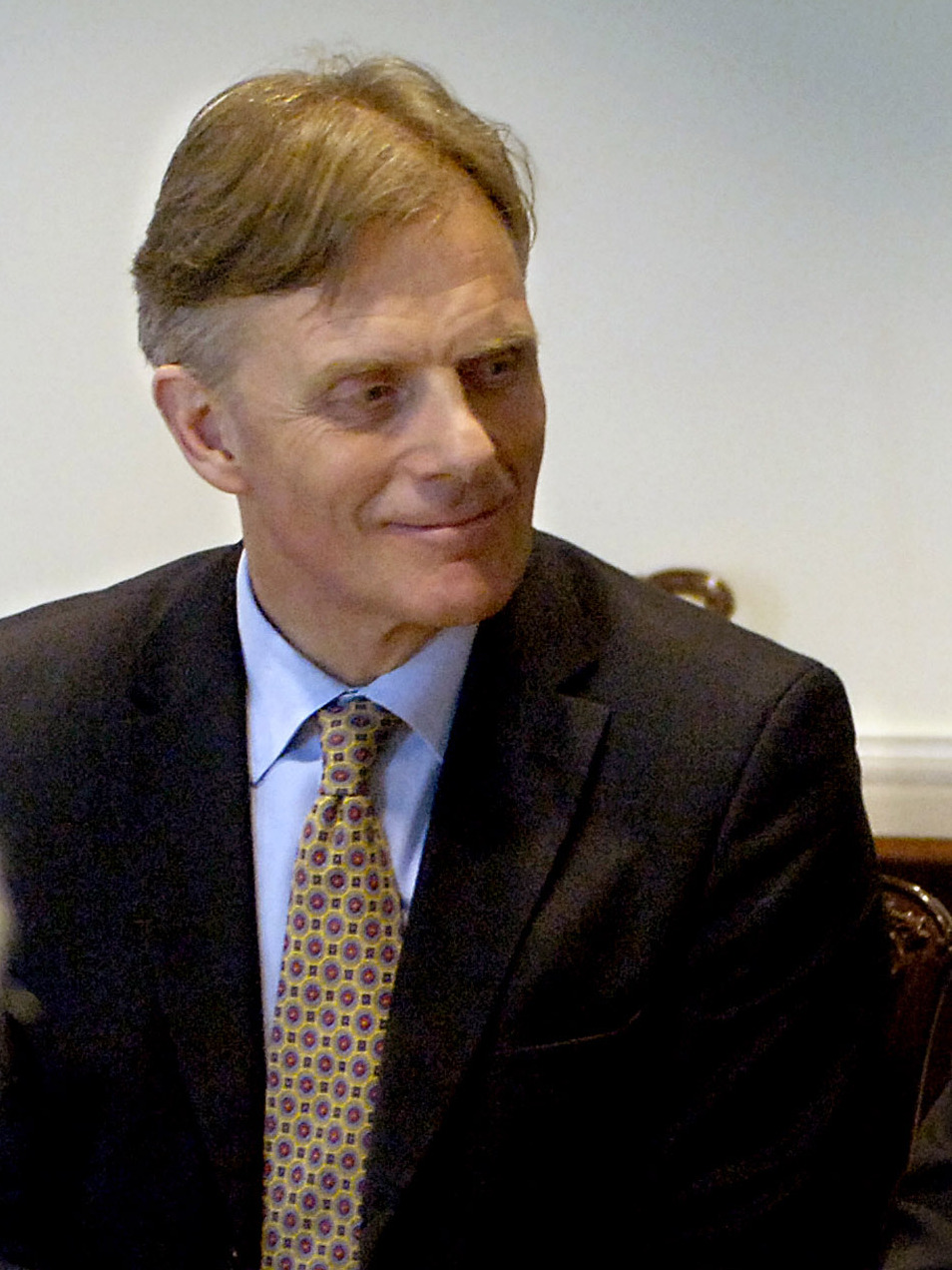
- Petersen in 2008

Danish Ambassador to Germany
- In office 15 August 2015 – 31 August 2020
- Preceded by: Per Poulsen-Hansen
- Succeeded by: Susanne Hyldelund

Danish Ambassador to China
- In office 2010 – 31 July 2015
- Preceded by: Jeppe Tranholm-Mikkelsen
- Succeeded by: Carsten Damsgaard

Danish Ambassador to the United States
- In office 2005–2010
- Preceded by: Ulrik Federspiel
- Succeeded by: Peter Taksøe-Jensen

Personal details
- Born: 25 November 1952 (age 73) Skagen, Denmark
- Education: University of Copenhagen

Friis Arne Petersen (born 25 November 1952) is a Danish diplomat.

== Early life ==
Petersen was born in 1952 in Skagen, Denmark. He was the middle of three children. Persuaded by teachers, he attended upper secondary school in Frederikshavn, before studying economics at the University of Copenhagen. Upon graduation, he was hired at the Ministry of Foreign Affairs.

== Career ==
From 1997 to 2005, Petersen served as Director of the Ministry of Foreign Affairs.

In 2005, Petersen was named as the Danish ambassador to the United States, a position he held until 2010. He then served as Danish ambassador to China from 2010 to 2015, when he then became ambassador to Germany. From 2015 to 2020, during his time as ambassador to Germany, he was also the accredited ambassador to both Switzerland and Liechtenstein.

In November 2025, Petersen accepted a position at Australian mining company Energy Transition Minerals.

== Personal life ==
Petersen married Birgitte Wilhelmsen in 1989. They have three children.
