= Sten Rynning =

Danish political scientist

Academic work
- Discipline: Political science
- Sub-discipline: War studies International relations
- Institutions: University of Southern Denmark
- Main interests: NATO, military alliances, strategy and transatlantic relations
- Notable works: NATO in Afghanistan (2012); NATO: From Cold War to Ukraine (2024)

Sten Rynning is a Danish political scientist and professor of war studies at the University of Southern Denmark. His research concerns NATO, military alliances, military strategy, international security and transatlantic relations. He founded the university's Center for War Studies in 2011 and became director of the Danish Institute for Advanced Study in August 2023.

Rynning has written several books about NATO, military history and transatlantic security. His 2024 book, NATO: From Cold War to Ukraine, was the subject of a multi-author review forum in International Affairs and received separate reviews in the Financial Times, the London Review of Books and The Times Literary Supplement.

== Academic career ==
Rynning has held teaching, research and administrative positions at the University of Southern Denmark. He established its Center for War Studies in 2011 and directed the centre until 2019. He subsequently served as vice dean for research in the university's Faculty of Business and Social Sciences from 2019 to 2022 and as interim dean from November 2021 to May 2022.

He was a visiting fellow at the NATO Defense College in Rome in 2012 and a scholar in residence at the American University School of International Service in Washington, D.C., in 2017. He later served as a non-resident associate fellow at the NATO Defense College.

Rynning became director of the Danish Institute for Advanced Study on 1 August 2023, succeeding Marianne Holmer. The institute is an interdisciplinary research unit within the University of Southern Denmark.

== Research and reception ==
Rynning's research has addressed alliance politics, military transformation, European security and the relationship between political ideas and international power. Much of his work examines NATO's development as an international organization, its military operations and its position within the European security order.

In a 2008 article written with Jens Ringsmose, Rynning argued that classical realism could help explain why some revisionist states seek to change the international order. They maintained that structural realist theories did not fully explain the domestic, historical and political sources of revisionist behaviour.

=== Books on NATO ===
Rynning's NATO Renewed: The Power and Purpose of Transatlantic Cooperation, published in 2005, examined the alliance's adaptation during the post-Cold War era, including the development of its crisis management and counterterrorism roles. The book was reviewed by political scientist Matthias Dembinski in the peer-reviewed journal Cooperation and Conflict.

His 2012 book, NATO in Afghanistan: The Liberal Disconnect, analysed NATO's involvement in the war in Afghanistan and the relationship between the alliance's political objectives and military operations. In a book review for H-War, part of H-Net, Douglas Peifer praised the book's analysis of NATO's internal dynamics and adaptation during the conflict, while criticizing its repetition and limited attention to the implementation of policy at the local level. The book was also selected as a 2013 Choice Outstanding Academic Title.

In 2024, Yale University Press published NATO: From Cold War to Ukraine, a History of the World's Most Powerful Alliance. The book follows the alliance from the signing of the North Atlantic Treaty in 1949 through the Cold War, the post-Cold War enlargement of NATO and the Russo-Ukrainian war.

The book received extensive critical attention. A review forum in International Affairs examined its account of NATO's political foundations, institutional development and strategic choices. John Paul Rathbone reviewed it in the Financial Times alongside Peter Apps's Deterring Armageddon, discussing Rynning's interpretation of the political ideas underlying the alliance. Tom Stevenson offered a more critical assessment in the London Review of Books, questioning the book's favourable interpretation of NATO's development and policies. Lawrence Freedman also reviewed the book in The Times Literary Supplement.

A review published by the Australian Institute of International Affairs described the book as a detailed history of NATO and discussed Rynning's treatment of alliance cohesion, enlargement and Russia–NATO relations.

== Public service ==
Rynning was a member of the commission appointed by the Norwegian government to evaluate Norway's military and civilian involvement in Afghanistan. The commission conducted its work in 2015 and 2016 and published the report A Good Ally: Norway in Afghanistan 2001–2014.

He also contributed to an official review of Danish foreign and security policy led by ambassador Peter Taksøe-Jensen. He later advised a commission examining Denmark's participation in military operations in the Kosovo War, the war in Afghanistan and the Iraq War.

Rynning has been used by Reuters as an analyst of NATO, European defence and relations between the United States and its European allies. His commentary has appeared in reporting on European military dependence on the United States and NATO summit diplomacy.

== Selected works ==
- Changing Military Doctrine: Presidents and Military Power in Fifth Republic France, 1958–2000. Praeger, 2001. ISBN 978-0-275-97286-8.
- NATO Renewed: The Power and Purpose of Transatlantic Cooperation. Palgrave Macmillan, 2005. ISBN 978-1-4039-7065-7.
- NATO in Afghanistan: The Liberal Disconnect. Stanford University Press, 2012. ISBN 978-0-8047-8238-8.
- Transforming Military Power since the Cold War: Britain, France, and the United States, 1991–2012. With Theo Farrell and Terry Terriff. Cambridge University Press, 2013. ISBN 978-1-107-04432-6.
- South Asia and the Great Powers: International Relations and Regional Security. Editor. I.B. Tauris, 2017. ISBN 978-1-78453-753-1.
- War Time: Temporality and the Decline of Western Military Power. Co-edited with Olivier Schmitt and Amélie Theussen. Brookings Institution Press, 2021. ISBN 978-0-8157-3894-7.
- NATO: From Cold War to Ukraine, a History of the World's Most Powerful Alliance. Yale University Press, 2024. ISBN 978-0-300-27011-2.

== See also ==
- International relations
- Security studies
- Strategic studies
- War studies
- NATO
- University of Southern Denmark
