= List of ambassadors of Denmark to the United States =

Ambassador of Denmark to the United States
- State Coat of Arms of the Kingdom of Denmark

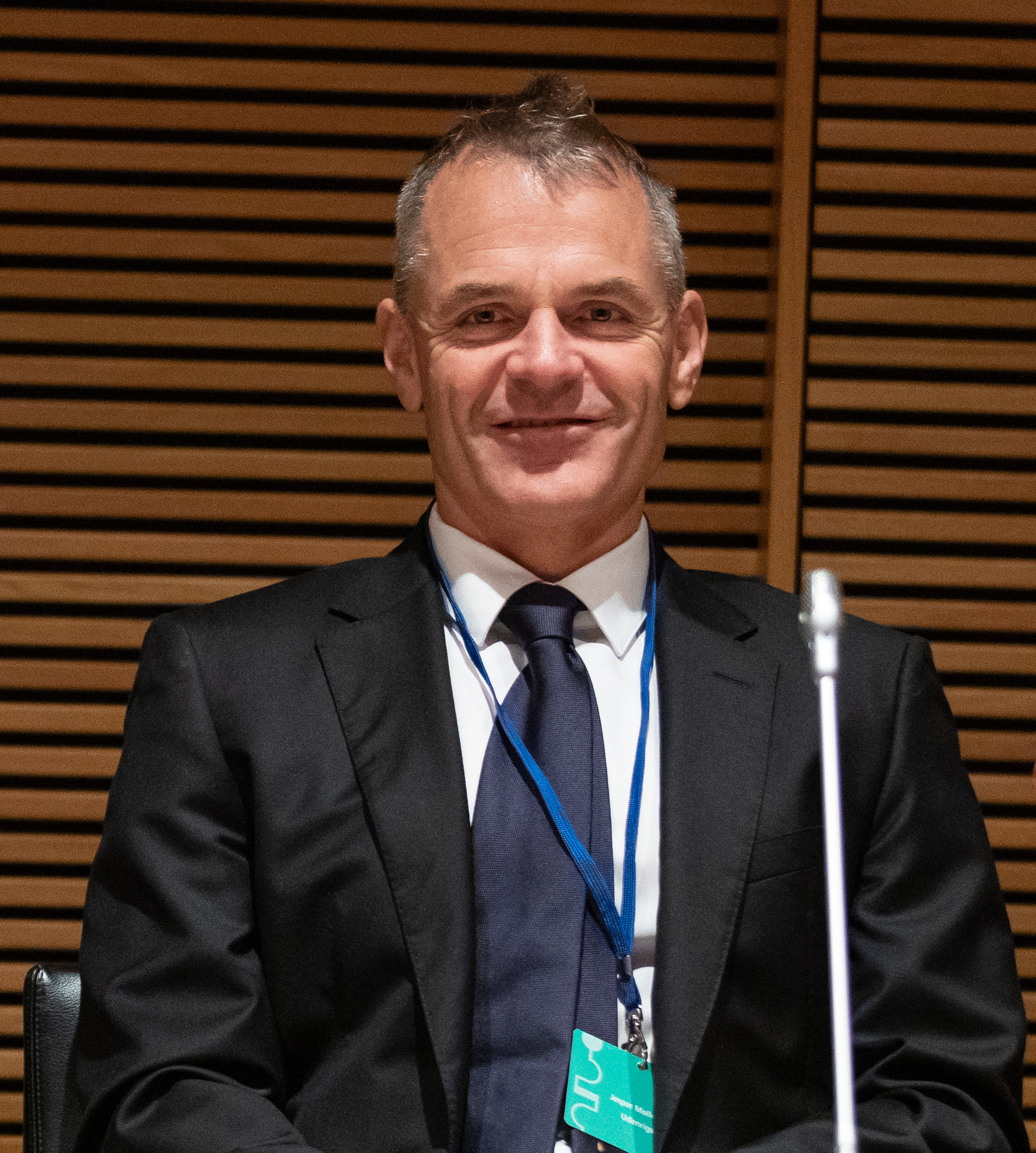
- Incumbent; Jesper Møller Sørensen since 1 September 2023
- Ministry of Foreign Affairs
- Style: Her Excellency (formal); Madam Ambassador (informal)
- Type: Ambassador
- Seat: Embassy of Denmark, Washington, D.C.
- Nominator: Ministry of Foreign Affairs
- Appointer: The monarch
- Formation: 1800
- First holder: J. Blicker Olson
- Website: Official website

The Danish ambassador in Washington, D. C. is the official representative of the Government in Copenhagen to the Government of the United States.

== History ==
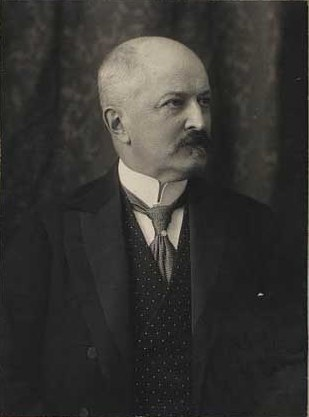
Poul Ludvig Ernst de Løvenørn (1839-1922), Minister from 1884 to 1888.

The Danish Legation was raised to Embassy status on February 6, 1947 during the leadership of Danish Minister Hans Hedtoft and U.S. President Harry S. Truman.

== List of representatives ==
Diplomatic agrément	Diplomatic accreditation	Ambassador	Observations	List of Danish government ministries	List of presidents of the United States	Term end
1800		Peder Blicher Olsen	Minister Resident		John Adams; Thomas Jefferson	1805
1805		Peder Pedersen	Minister Resident		Thomas Jefferson; James Madison; James Monroe; John Quincy Adams	1826
1826		Steen Bille	Chargé d'affaires		John Quincy Adams; Andrew Jackson; Martin Van Buren; William Henry Harrison; John Tyler; James K. Polk; Zachary Taylor; Millard Fillmore; Franklin Pierce	1854
1854		Torben Bille	Chargé d'affaires		Franklin Pierce; James Buchanan	1858
1858		Valdemar Rudolph von Raasløff	Chargé d'affaires		James Buchanan; Abraham Lincoln; Andrew Johnson	1866
1866		Johan Hegermann-Lindencrone	Chargé d'affaires		Andrew Johnson; Ulysses S. Grant; Rutherford B. Hayes	1880
1880		Carl Steen Andersen Bille	Minister Resident		Rutherford B. Hayes; James A. Garfield; Chester A. Arthur	1884
1884		P. L. E. de Lövenörn	Minister Resident		Chester A. Arthur; Grover Cleveland	1888
1888		E. W. Sponneck	Minister Resident		Grover Cleveland; Benjamin Harrison	1893
October 20, 1893		Count F. de Reventlow	Count Reventlow was appointed to the Ministry for Foreign Affairs in 1909.	Jacob Estrup	Grover Cleveland	
October 21, 1895	June 1, 1895	Constantin Brun		Tage Reedtz-Thott	Grover Cleveland	
November 10, 1908		Carl Moltke		Niels Neergaard	Theodore Roosevelt	
November 8, 1912		Constantin Brun		Klaus Berntsen	Barack Obama	
December 1, 1930		Hubert de Wichfeld (1886 - 1979)	Chargé d'affaires	Thorvald Stauning	Herbert C. Hoover	
December 22, 1930		Otto Wadsted (1881-1961)		Thorvald Stauning	Herbert C. Hoover	
August 22, 1939	August 26, 1939	Henrik Kauffmann		Thorvald Stauning	Franklin D. Roosevelt	
February 6, 1947			Legation Raised to Embassy	Hans Hedtoft	Harry S. Truman	
February 6, 1947	March 8, 1947	Henrik Kauffmann	Ambassador-designate	Hans Hedtoft	Harry S. Truman	
October 9, 1958	October 31, 1958	Count Kjeld Gustav Knuth-Winterfeldt		Hans Christian Svane Hansen	Dwight D. Eisenhower	
April 6, 1965	April 13, 1965	Torben Ronne		Jens Otto Krag	Lyndon B. Johnson	
August 20, 1971		Hans J. Christensen	Chargé d'affaires	Jens Otto Krag	Richard Nixon	
September 3, 1971	September 21, 1971	Eyvind Bartels		Jens Otto Krag	Richard Nixon	
November 26, 1975		Peter Pedersen Dyvig	Chargé d'affaires, (*February 23, 1934 in Nordborg) A ambassador to London, Washington and Paris. Father of Christian Dyvig	Anker Jørgensen	Gerald Ford	
February 5, 1976	February 24, 1976	Otto Borchlda		Anker Jørgensen	Gerald Ford	
November 20, 1983	January 9, 1984	Eigil Jørgensen		Poul Schlüter	Ronald Reagan	
June 5, 1989	August 3, 1989	Peter Pedersen Dyvig		Poul Schlüter	George H. W. Bush	
September 5, 1995	September 15, 1995	Knud Erik Tygesen		Poul Nyrup Rasmussen	Bill Clinton	
May 9, 2000	June 14, 2000	Ulrik Federspiel		Poul Nyrup Rasmussen	Bill Clinton	
October 3, 2005	October 3, 2005	Friis Arne Petersen		Anders Fogh Rasmussen	George W. Bush	
September 1, 2010	September 16, 2010	Peter Taksøe-Jensen		Lars Løkke Rasmussen	Barack Obama	31 July 2015
August 19, 2015	September 17, 2015	Lars Gert Lose		Lars Løkke Rasmussen	Barack Obama	1 January 2019
	8 April 2019	Lone Dencker Wisborg		Lars Løkke Rasmussen	Donald Trump	1 September 2022
September 1, 2023	September 15, 2023	Jesper Møller Sørensen		Mette Frederiksen	Joe Biden	

== See also ==
- List of ambassadors of the United States to Denmark
- Denmark–United States relations
