= Denmark's role in maritime security in NATO =

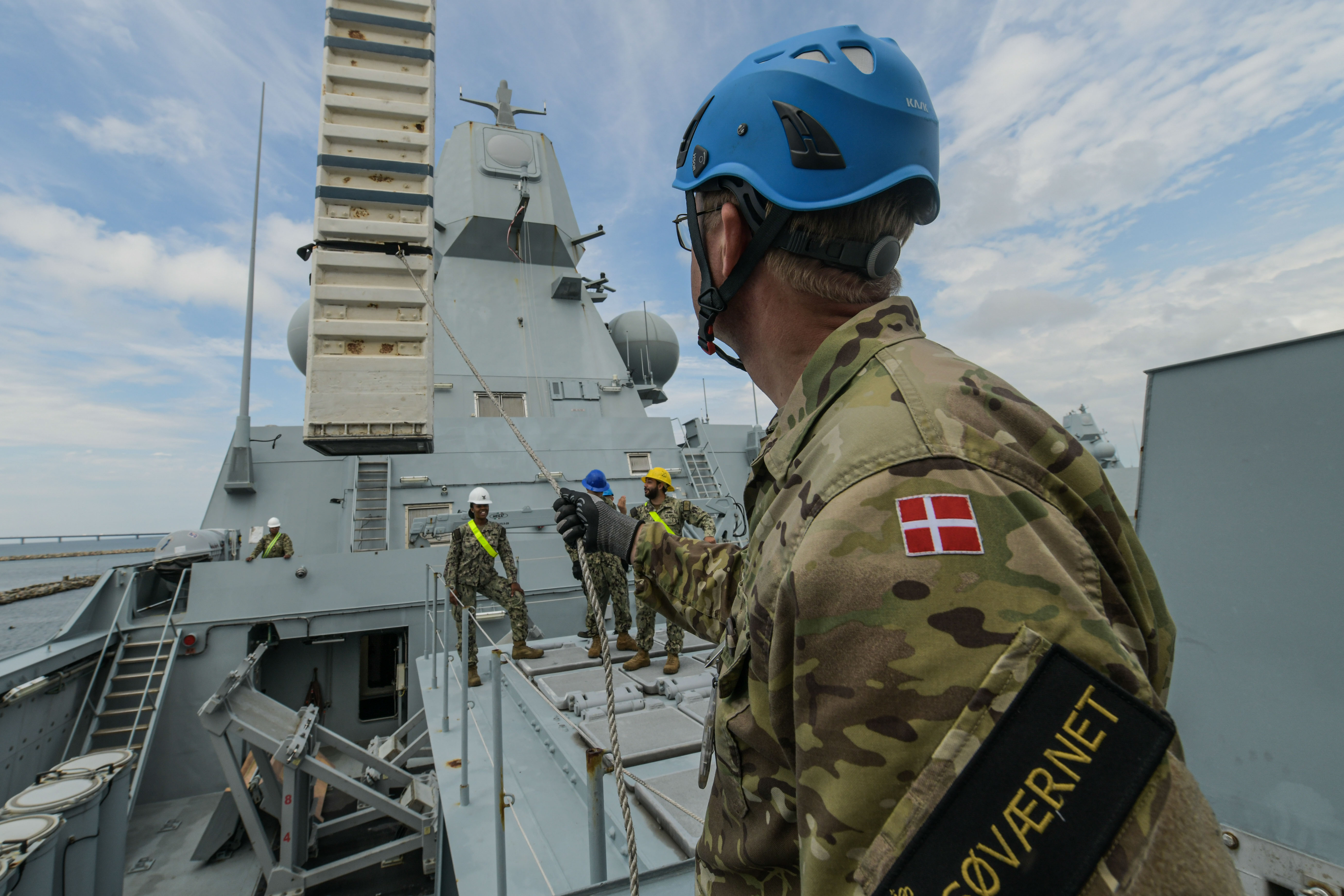
Missiles being loaded by Danish forces during a NATO military exercise

Denmark participates in NATO as a maritime security ally. It has a maritime heritage and a position bridging Europe and the Arctic.

== Historical commitment and naval modernization ==
Following World War II, Denmark rebuilt its entire naval fleet. The decision to join NATO in 1949 accelerated naval modernization efforts and was supported by other nations in NATO.

=== Cold War ===
During the Cold War, Denmark played a role in NATO's maritime defense strategy, particularly in the Baltic Sea region. Despite imposing limitations on full military integration within NATO, Denmark actively participated in exercises and regional defense initiatives.

== Contributions to NATO's maritime operations ==
NATO's articulated its commitment to maritime security in its 2022 Strategic Concept. In order to realize this commitment, NATO conducts maritime operations covering deterrence, crisis management, and cooperative security. Denmark, as a NATO member, plays a role within the alliance's naval forces, contributing to maritime initiatives.

=== Standing Naval Forces (SNF) ===
The Standing Naval Forces (SNF) of NATO comprise four groups, operating across the alliance's maritime area of responsibility. These groups include the Standing NATO Maritime Groups (SNMG1 and SNMG2) and the Standing NATO Mine Countermeasures Groups (SNMCMG1 and SNMCMG2), which are all components of the NATO Response Force (NRF). Denmark's participation in these forces bolsters NATO's maritime defense posture.

=== Operation Active Endeavour (OAE) and Operation Sea Guardian (OSG) ===
Operation Active Endeavour (OAE) was launched in the Mediterranean following the September 11, 2001 terrorist attacks. Denmark has continuously contributed to this operation with the corvettes Niels Juel, Olfert Fischer, and Peter Tordenskiold, the submarine Sælen, the missile vessels Ravnen and Viben, as well as a LYNX helicopter. The Danish command support ships Absalon and Esbern Snare have also been used in OAE, sailing through the Mediterranean to the Gulf of Aden as part of NATO's now-closed Operation Ocean Shield, where they were involved in combating piracy.

At the NATO Summit in Warsaw in July 2016, it was decided to transition the Article 5 operation Active Endeavour to a non-Article 5 operation named Operation Sea Guardian (OSG).

=== Operation Ocean Shield ===
NATO's Operation Ocean Shield aimed to combat piracy in the waters off the Horn of Africa. From August 5 to early December 2010, Denmark contributed to this operation with the support vessel Esbern Snare as well as a helicopter. A Danish force commander led the operation during the same period. Denmark's participation in NATO's Operation Ocean Shield was part of its involvement in NATO's Standing NATO Maritime Group 1. Due to the size of Denmark's merchant fleet, Operation Ocean Shield has been a priority in the nation. Denmark has contributed to the operation on several occasions with the support vessels Absalon and Esbern Snare, the frigate Iver Huitfeldt, and a Challenger surveillance aircraft conducting reconnaissance flights over the operational area.

At the Warsaw Summit, it was decided to restructure NATO's maritime operations. In connection with this decision, it was subsequently decided in December 2016, due to the improved security situation off the Horn of Africa, to close down Operation Ocean Shield. Although Operation Ocean Shield has concluded, NATO continues to monitor the situation off the Horn of Africa to be prepared to counter any resurgence of piracy if necessary.

=== Aegean Sea operations ===
In February 2016, it was decided that NATO would provide support to Greece, Turkey, and the EU in their efforts to manage the refugee crisis. Denmark contributed with the support ship Absalon.

== Location of Denmark ==
Denmark is located near potential flashpoints in the Baltic Sea and the Arctic.

=== The role of Greenland ===
Denmark has a strategic relationship with Greenland. Recent geopolitical shifts have revived American interest in Greenland and the North Atlantic region. Leveraging its influence over Greenland, Denmark can enhance transatlantic relations, particularly in bolstering Arctic coast guard capacities.

=== The Baltic Sea ===
NATO has had security challenges in the Baltic Sea region and Denmark has been involved in addressing the Russian invasion of Ukraine. Due to NATO's expansion and Russia's actions, Denmark's location plays a role in monitoring and responding to regional security threats and is actively involved in NATO's defense transformation initiatives.
