= Embassy of Denmark, Washington, D.C. =

Danish Embassy, Washington, D.C.
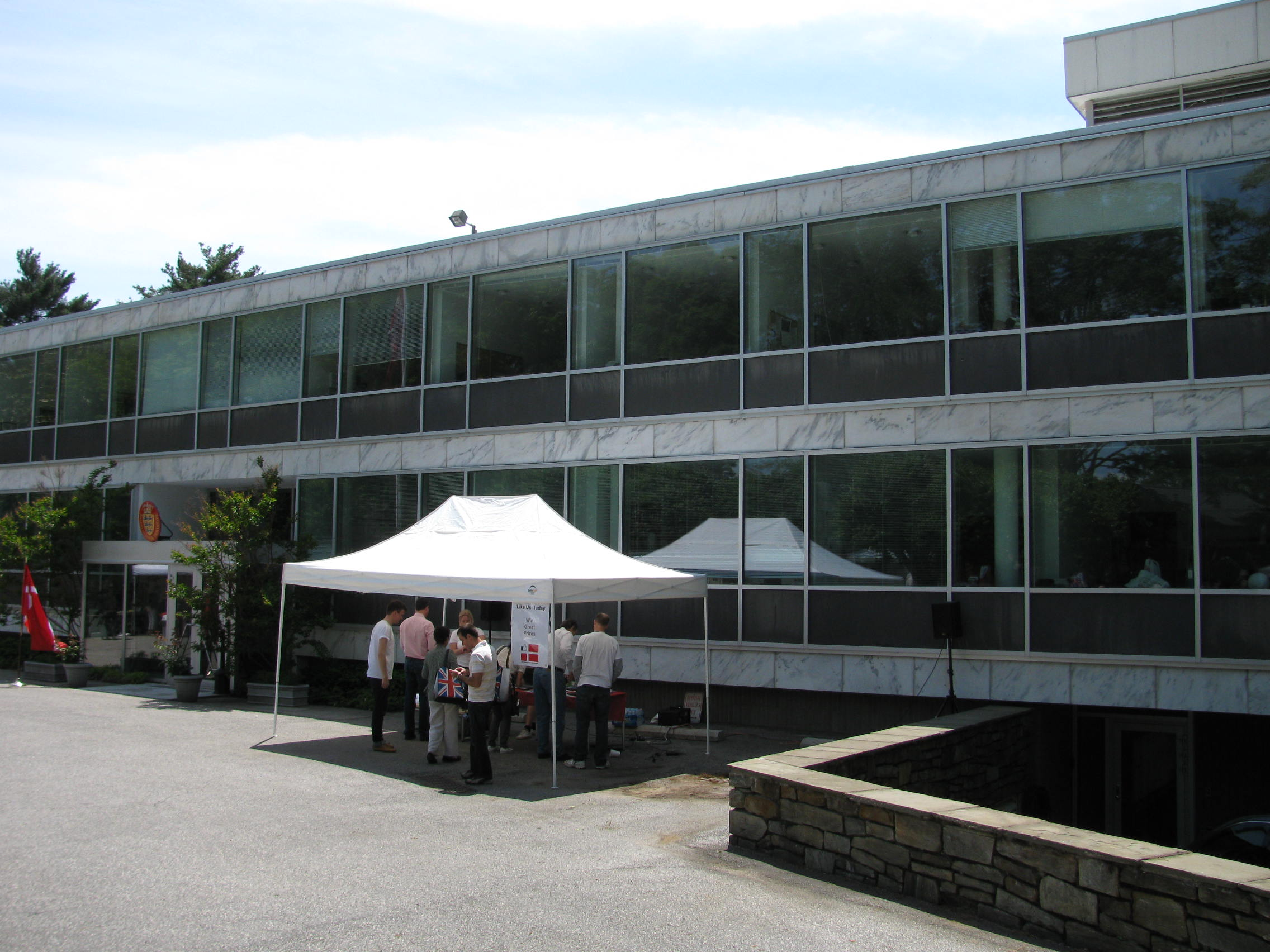
- The embassy in 2011
- Location: Washington, D.C.
- Address: 3200 Whitehaven St., NW
- Coordinates: 38°55′2″N 77°3′47″W
- Ambassador: Lone Dencker Wisborg
- Website: usa.um.dk

The Danish Embassy in Washington, D.C. is the Kingdom of Denmark's diplomatic mission to the United States. It is located at 3200 Whitehaven St., NW in Washington, D.C. The embassy also operates consulates-general in Chicago, Houston, New York City and in Palo Alto, California.

== History ==
After World War II, Danish Ambassador to the United States Henrik Kauffmann (1888–1963) suggested that Denmark needed a new embassy and he found that the best solution would be to construct a new purpose-built embassy on a recently acquired piece of land. Leading Danish Modernist architect Vilhelm Lauritzen was charged with the commission and the building was completed in 1960. It was the first modern embassy building to be built in the United States.

On June 4, 2010 the 50th anniversary of the embassy was celebrated with a ceremony attended by Crown Prince Frederik of Denmark.

== Building ==
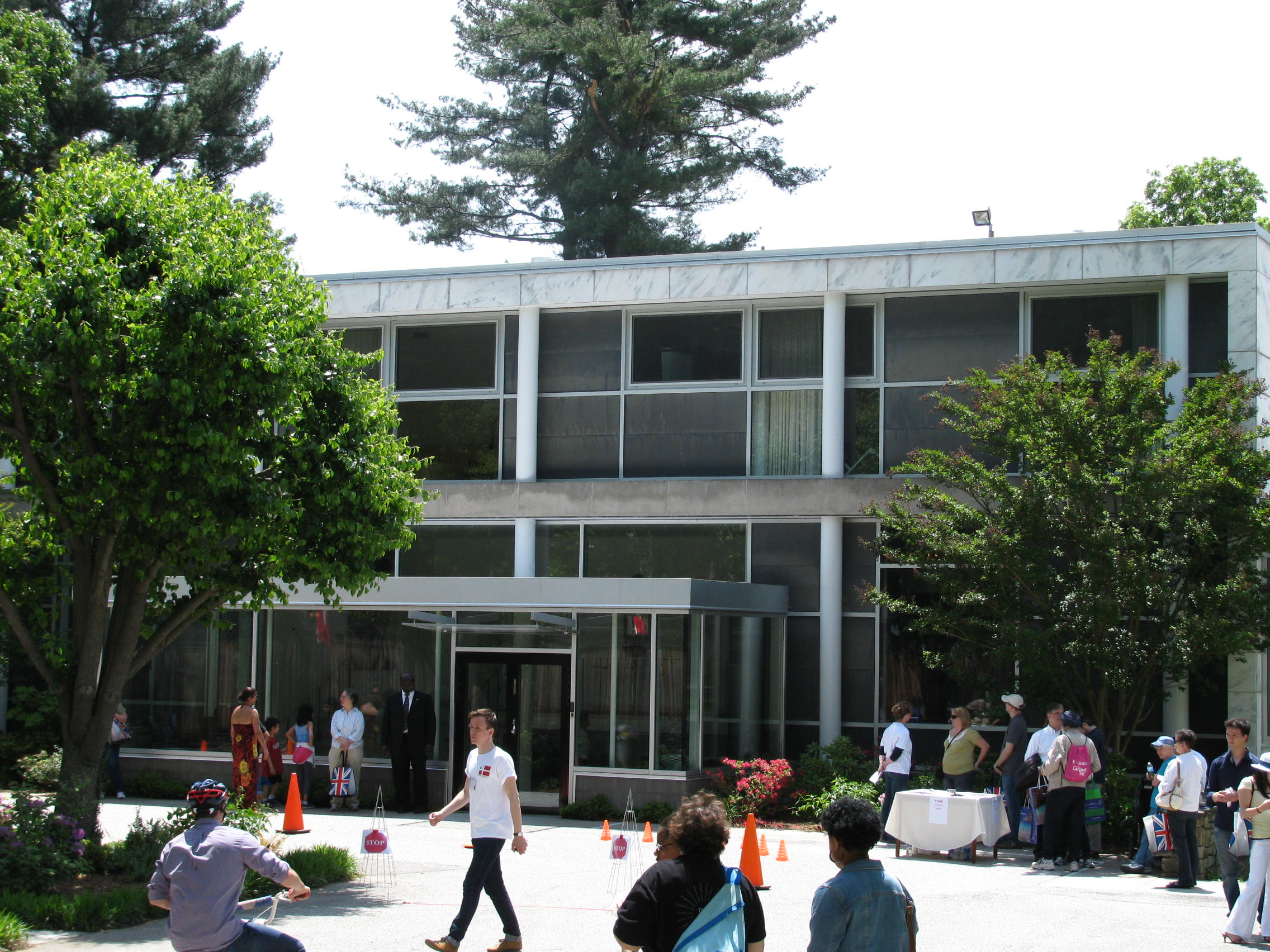
Ambassador's residence

The embassy building is perched on a hilltop, set back from the street, and houses both the Ambassador's residence and the chancellery. It is built to a simple and restrained Modernist design. Both the exterior and interior is clad in marble from Greenland.

Finn Juhl, another leading Danish Modernist designer, was put in charge of interior decorations and he furnished the embassy both with furniture of his own and design and other Danish furniture classics, such as Arne Jacobsen chairs and Poul Henningsen lighting.

The Ugly Duckling fountain, by Marshall Fredericks, was installed in 1994.

== See also ==
- Denmark–United States relations
- List of diplomatic missions of Denmark
- List of diplomatic missions in Washington, D.C.
