= Lone Dencker Wisborg =

Danish diplomat, lawyer and civil servant

Her Excellency Lone Dencker Wisborg R.1 gcYC
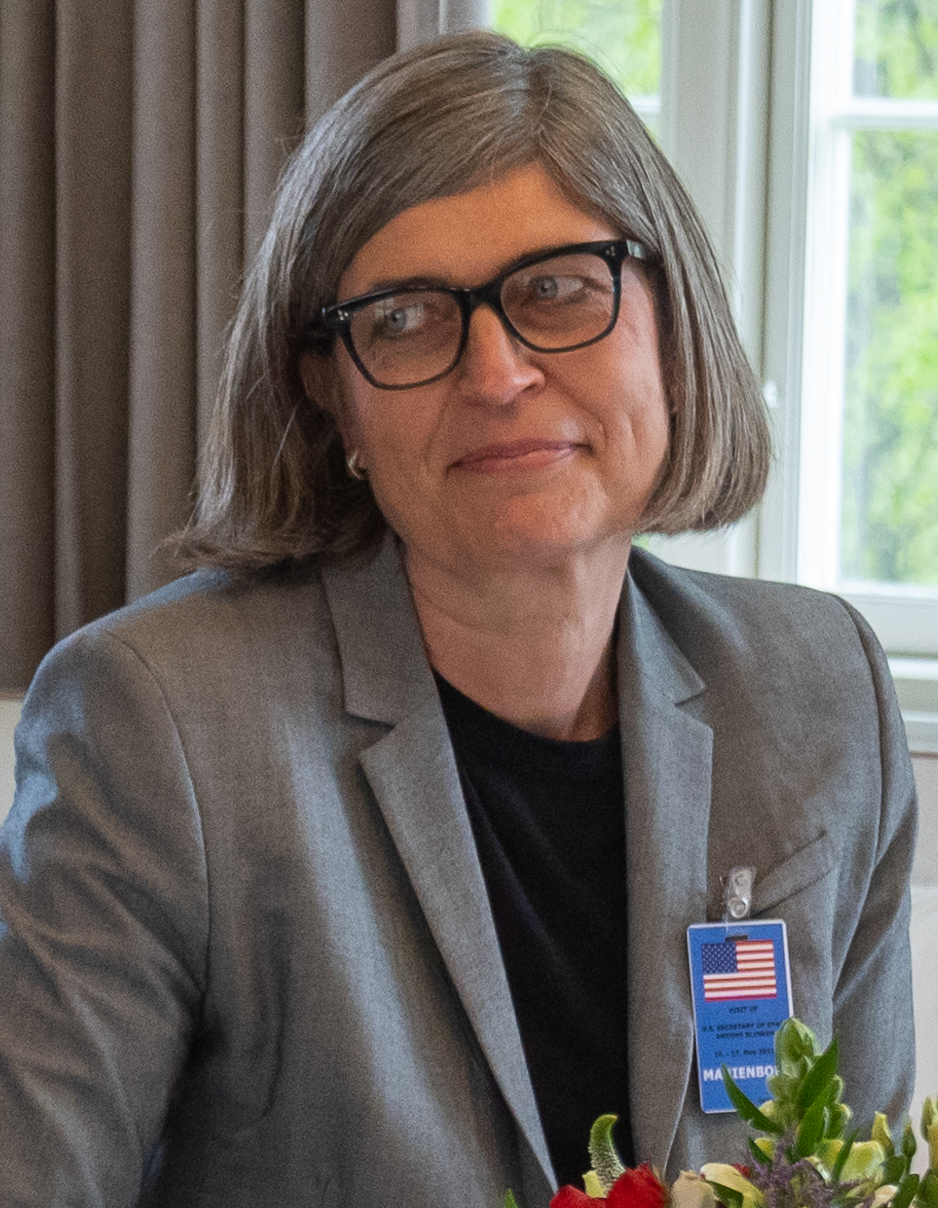
- Lone Dencker Wisborg in 2021.

Permanent Representative of Denmark to NATO
- In office 2 September 2022 – 1 January 2025
- Monarchs: Margrethe II; Frederik X
- Prime Minister: Mette Frederiksen
- Preceded by: Liselotte Plesner
- Succeeded by: Kasper Høeg-Jensen

Ambassador of Denmark to the United States
- In office 8 April 2019 – 1 September 2022
- Monarch: Margrethe II
- President: Donald Trump; Joe Biden
- Prime Minister: Lars Løkke Rasmussen; Mette Frederiksen
- Preceded by: Lars Gert Lose
- Succeeded by: Christina Markus Lassen

Ambassador of Denmark to Spain
- In office September 2011 – August 2015
- Monarch: Margrethe II
- Prime Minister: Helle Thorning-Schmidt; Lars Løkke Rasmussen
- Succeeded by: John Nielsen

Personal details
- Born: 31 January 1966 (age 60) Brønderslev, Denmark
- Education: Aarhus University

Lone Dencker Wisborg (born 31 January 1966) is a Danish diplomat, lawyer and civil servant. She was the Permanent Representative of Denmark to NATO between 2022 and 2025, having previously served as Ambassador of Denmark to the United States, from 2019 to 2022, the first woman to hold that position.

== Early life and education ==
Lone Dencker Wisborg was born on 31 January 1966 in Brønderslev, Denmark. She grew up in Brønderslev in Northern Jutland, with her mother, father and an older brother four years her senior.

In 1991, she obtained a Master of Laws (cand.jur) degree from Aarhus University.

== Diplomatic career ==
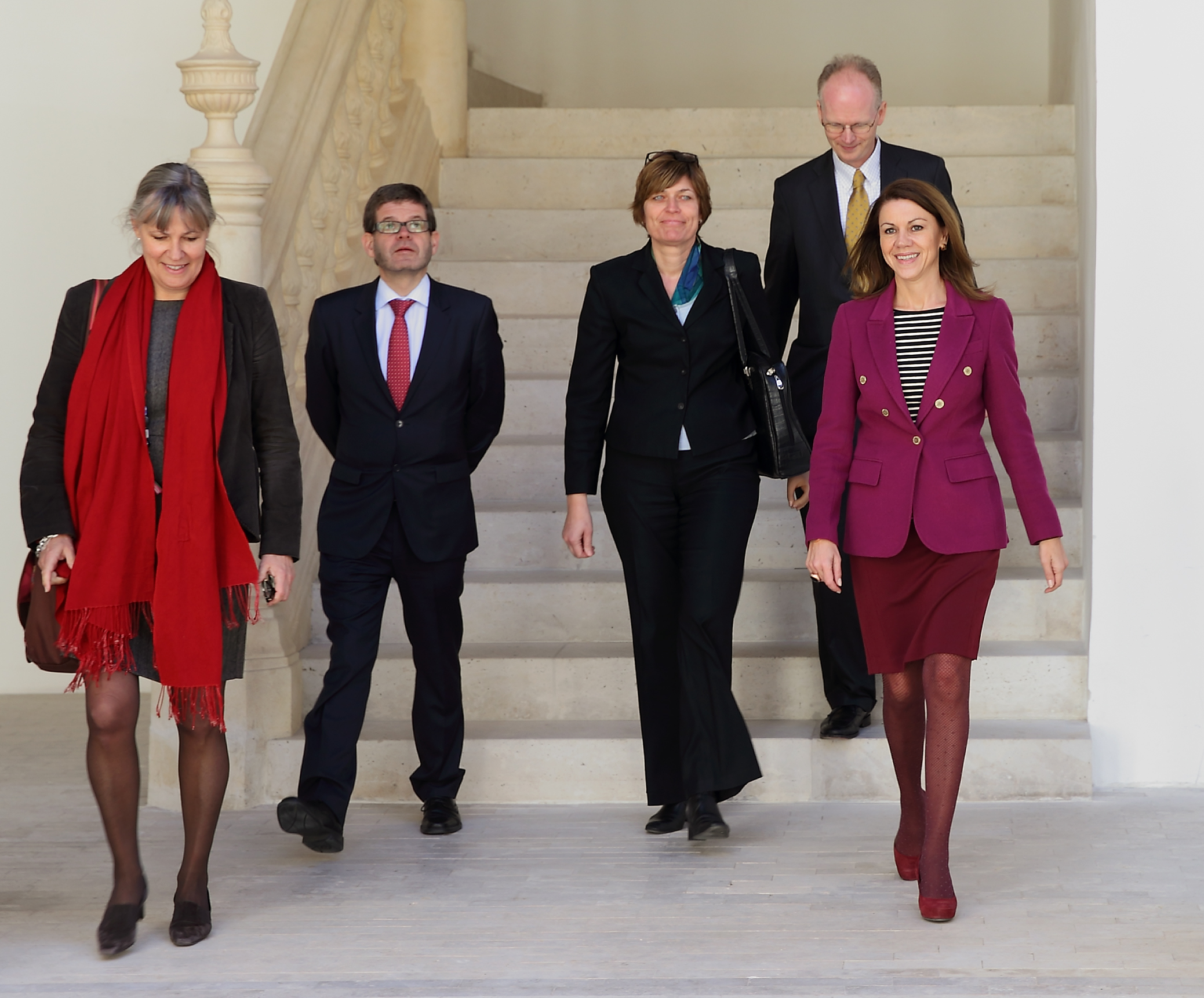
Wisborg in 2013, during a meeting with Spanish Defence Minister, María Dolores de Cospedal, together with the other ambassadors from the Nordic countries.

Wisborg began her diplomatic career at the Ministry of Foreign Affairs in 1992 as Head of Section with responsibility for development assistance, assistance to Eastern Europe and international law, a post she held until 1995. She was then assigned to the Danish Embassy in Estonia as First Secretary, from 1995 to 1998. Thereafter, she worked as Head of the International Department and Secretary to the Defence Committee at the Danish Parliament, and subsequently served as Private Secretary to the Minister for Foreign Affairs from 2001 to 2003, and then posted as Deputy Chief of Mission, Royal Danish Embassy in Warsaw, Poland, from 2004 to 2006. She had a brief interlude as Chief Operating Officer (COO) for the Bikuben Foundation, before becoming Head of the Department of Security Policy at the Ministry of Foreign Affairs from 2007 to 2009. From 2009 to 2011, she was Under-Secretary for Global Security.

In 2011, Wisborg assumed her first ambassadorial appointment, becoming the Ambassador of Denmark to the Kingdom of Spain. During her time as ambassador, Wisborg advocated for e.g. increased agricultural support for impoverished Spanish regions at EU-level, modernization of the European Union, ⁣renewable energy transition and environmental awareness. She served concurrently as Denmark's responsible diplomat to Andorra and was simultaneously side-accredited in Algeria.

She was recalled to Denmark in 2015, and acted as State Secretary for Foreign Policy, becoming chief operating officer in the Danish Ministry of Foreign Affairs in 2017.

=== United States ===
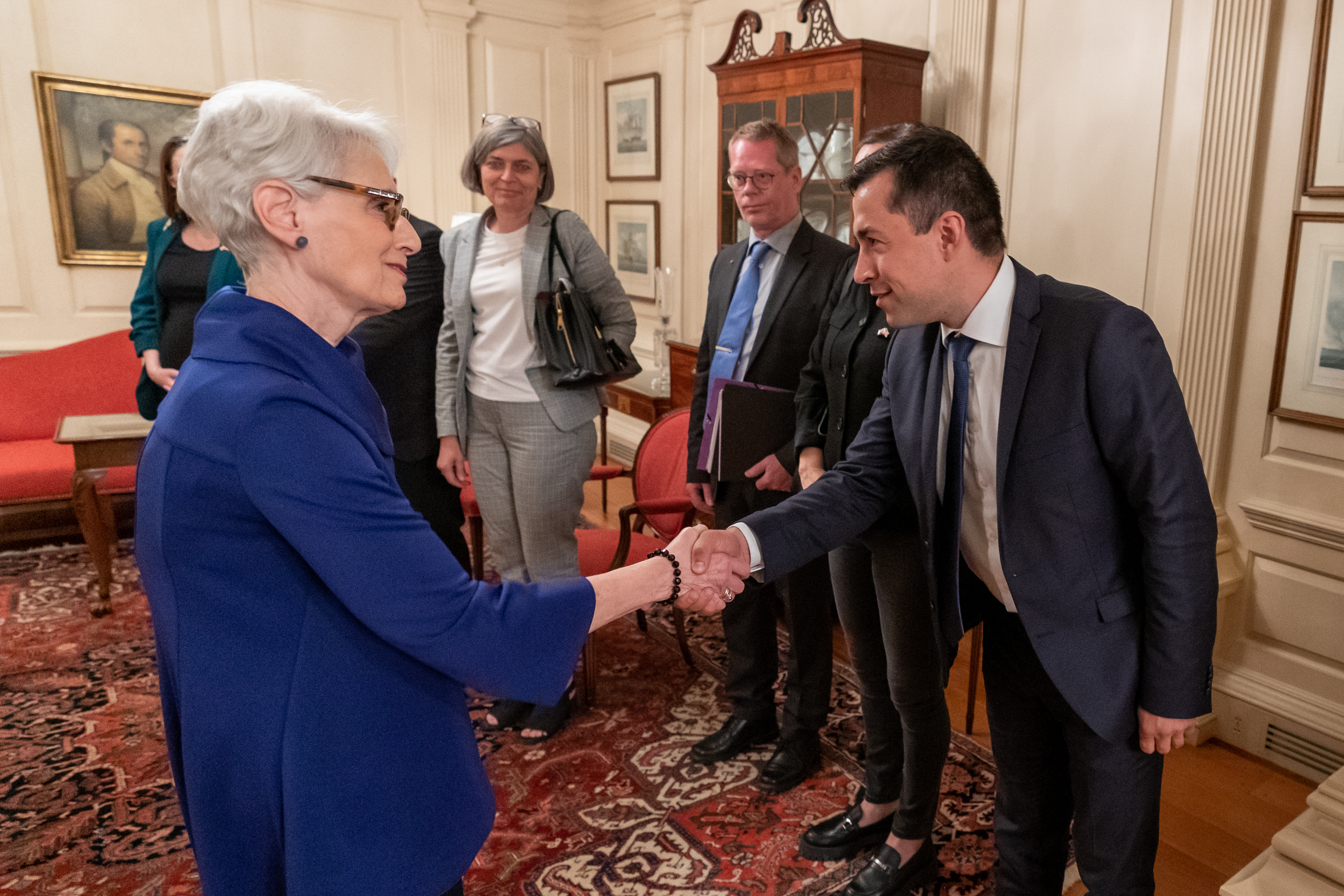
Lone D. Wisborg (in the background) and Greenlandic officials meet with US Deputy Secretary of State, Wendy Sherman.

In the 2019 ambassadorial reshuffle, Wisborg was appointed Ambassador of Denmark to the United States, as the first woman to hold the position. She presented her credentials to President Donald J. Trump at the White House, on 8 April 2019, having previously, on 1 April, presented these to Ambassador Sean Lawler, Chief of Protocol of the United States, in a ceremony at the State Department.

==== Trump's Greenland proposal and diplomatic tensions ====
In August 2019, during Lone Dencker Wisborg’s ambassadorship in Washington, President Donald Trump unexpectedly proposed that the United States purchase Greenland, an unprecedented suggestion that rapidly escalated into a diplomatic crisis between Denmark and its closest ally. The proposal was widely criticized, with Kim Kielsen, the Premier of Greenland, firmly affirming that the territory was not for sale. Danish Prime Minister Mette Frederiksen calling the notion "absurd". In response, Trump described Frederiksen’s comments as “nasty” and cancelled a planned state visit to Denmark, originally scheduled to take place two weeks later.

Upon hearing of the cancellation while en route to Denmark for the annual Ambassadors' Conference in Copenhagen, Wisborg returned immediately to Washington to manage the fallout. Coordinating with the Danish Ministry of Foreign Affairs and Prime Minister's Office and drawing on extensive diplomatic channels, she rapidly facilitated "several meetings" with the US Department of State, the National Security Council, and the Pentagon to de-escalate tensions. She also helped re-establish formal dialogue between the Danish and American governments, culminating in a call between Frederiksen and Trump. Speaking to multiple American media outlets afterwards, he unexpectedly lauded Frederiksen as a "wonderful woman".

Despite the unusual nature of the episode, Wisborg’s efforts contributed to a constructive aftermath. The U.S. consulate in Nuuk, closed since 1953, was subsequently reopened, and a protracted dispute over the Pituffik Space Base service contract was resolved in a manner favourable to Greenlandic enterprises.

Initially, she publicly declined to comment on Trump's interest in buying Greenland. However, reflecting on the incident in a 2025 interview, Wisborg noted the inherent difficulties of managing diplomacy under the Trump administration, and stated that she and her diplomatic team initially regarded Donald Trump's desire as "a joke". Wisborg described the Trump administration’s diplomacy as particularly challenging due to its unpredictability and lack of internal coherence. Diplomats, she explained, had to consult multiple sources, ranging from the State Department to the National Security Council and private think tanks, to ascertain intentions, none of which could be considered fully authoritative. “Unpredictability is one of his strongest cards, and he plays on it,” she noted.

==== Policy areas ====
As ambassador, Wisborg facilitated discussions related to US-Danish cooperation in green water technology, signing a memorandum of understanding regarding a cooperation agreement on Danish water technology to Houston, Texas. She also advocated for increased collaboration between American and Danish researchers in quantum technology, emphasizing that it is "crucial that democratic governments take the lead in ensuring the responsible development and use of quantum technologies". Additionally, she engaged in meetings with Under Secretary for Political Affairs David Hale during her time as Ambassador.

The working paper that Wisborg received from the Danish government before officially beginning her ambassadorship, outlined the direction of the embassy's activities, with a special emphasis on the work between Danish and American soldiers during joint missions. The correspondence on mutual defence policies resulted in Denmark committing to send an additional 500 soldiers to international missions in September 2019, as well as taking over responsibility from Canada for NATO's training mission for Iraqi soldiers

In October 2019, she, together with the four other Nordic US ambassadors, Bergdis Ellertsdottir (Iceland), Karin Olufsdotter (Sweden), Kirsti Kauppi (Finland) and Kåre R. Aas (Norway), formed a unified Nordic front, advocating for climate change action in Washington, highlighting Scandinavian solutions and initiatives.

She participated in the 2022 Arctic Encounter symposium in Anchorage, Alaska.

=== NATO ===
In the 2023 ambassadorial reshuffle, Wisborg was appointed Permanent Representative of Denmark to NATO, and represented Denmark in the North Atlantic Council. She served in this position until 2025, when she became self-employed and started the firm Wisborg Advisory to advise companies on geopolitical challenges.

== Personal life ==
She is the mother of a son born via a donor. She is the owner of three dogs and enjoys tennis, golf and politics.

== Honours ==
=== National ===
Denmark:

- Knight 1st Class of the Order of the Dannebrog (2016)

=== International ===
Spain:

- Knight Grand Cross of the Order of Isabella the Catholic (2015)
