= 1964 in Danish television =

This is a list of Danish television related events from 1964.

== Events ==
- 15 February – Bjørn Tidmand is selected to represent Denmark at the 1964 Eurovision Song Contest with his song "Sangen om dig". He is selected to be the eighth Danish Eurovision entry during Dansk Melodi Grand Prix held at the Tivolis Koncertsal in Copenhagen.
- 21 March – The 9th Eurovision Song Contest is held at the Tivolis Koncertsal in Copenhagen. Italy wins the contest with the song "Non ho l'età", performed by Gigliola Cinquetti.

== Births ==
- 4 January – Mek Pek, singer, actor & TV host
- 1 June – Marianne Florman, handball player & TV host
- 3 November – Paprika Steen, actress

== See also ==
- 1964 in Denmark
