= Ugly Duckling fountain =

Sculpture by Marshall Fredericks

- Artist: Marshall Fredericks
- Location: United States

Ugly Duckling fountain is a sculpture by Marshall Fredericks.

== Examples ==
There are eight examples, including Danish Village, Rochester Hills, Michigan, Greenville, Michigan, and the Danish Embassy, Washington, D.C. In 2007, the Danish Village example was restored.
