= Mai Gehrke =

Danish mathematician

Mai Gehrke (born 10 May 1964) is a Danish mathematician who studies the theory of lattices and their applications to mathematical logic and theoretical computer science. She is a director of research for the French Centre national de la recherche scientifique (CNRS), affiliated with the Laboratoire J. A. Dieudonné (LJAD) at the University of Nice Sophia Antipolis.

== Education ==
As a child, Gehrke was educated at a French school in Algiers, which used a Bourbakist and very abstract mathematics curriculum. As a high school student in Denmark, she spent a year as an exchange student in Houston studying painting, but was brought back to mathematics by a Polish mathematics teacher who taught her point-set topology according to the Moore method.

She earned her Ph.D. from the University of Houston in 1987. Her dissertation, Order Structure of Stone Spaces and the TD-axiom, was supervised by Klaus Hermann Kaiser.

== Career ==
After postdoctoral study at Vanderbilt University, Gehrke joined the faculty of New Mexico State University in 1990. She moved to Radboud University Nijmegen in 2007, and to CNRS in 2011. From 2011 to 2017 her work for CNRS was associated with the Laboratoire d'Informatique Algorithmique: Fondements et Applications (LIAFA) at Paris Diderot University; in 2017 she moved to LJAD in Sophia Antipolis.
