= Denmark–United States relations =

Bilateral relations

- Denmark: United States

Diplomatic mission
- Embassy of Denmark, Washington, D.C.: Embassy of the United States, Copenhagen

Envoy
- Danish Ambassador to the United States Jesper Møller Sørensen: Chargé d'affaires Mark Stroh

Diplomatic relations between Denmark and the United States of America began in 1783. Both countries are founding members of the Arctic Council, OECD, OSCE, NATO and the United Nations.

== History ==
=== 1776-1826 ===
Diplomatic relations date back to 1783, when Denmark signed a commercial treaty with the United States. In 1792, Denmark recognized the independence of the United States. In 1801, diplomatic relations were established, and an American legation was opened in Denmark. The diplomatic relations have never experienced an interruption, since 1801.

In 1801, Denmark became an ally of France in its war against Great Britain, and the Danish Navy seized American merchant ships. A treaty of commerce was signed in 1826, and Denmark agreed to pay the United States an indemnity of $650,000.

==== Agreements - US and Kingdom of Denmark 1776–1826 ====
Year	Event	Description	Primary Source Link
1783	Commercial Treaty Negotiations	Denmark and the United States negotiate an initial commercial treaty framework to regulate growing maritime commerce.	N/A
1792	Official Recognition & Consular Relations	Denmark officially recognizes the independence of the United States on June 9, 1792, granting an exequatur to the first U.S. Consul at Copenhagen.	U.S. Consular Records
1801	Establishment of Diplomatic Relations	Continuous, formal diplomatic ties begin on October 12, 1801, when the Danish Minister Resident to the United States officially presents credentials.	U.S. Diplomatic Dispatches
1801–1814	Napoleonic Maritime Friction	As a French ally, the Danish Navy seizes several American merchant ships during the Napoleonic Wars, sparking long-running indemnity disputes.	N/A
1826	General Convention of Friendship, Commerce, and Navigation	Signed on April 26, 1826, this landmark treaty establishes mutual most-favored-nation status and resolves lingering merchant indemnity claims.	8 Stat. 340 (Wikisource)

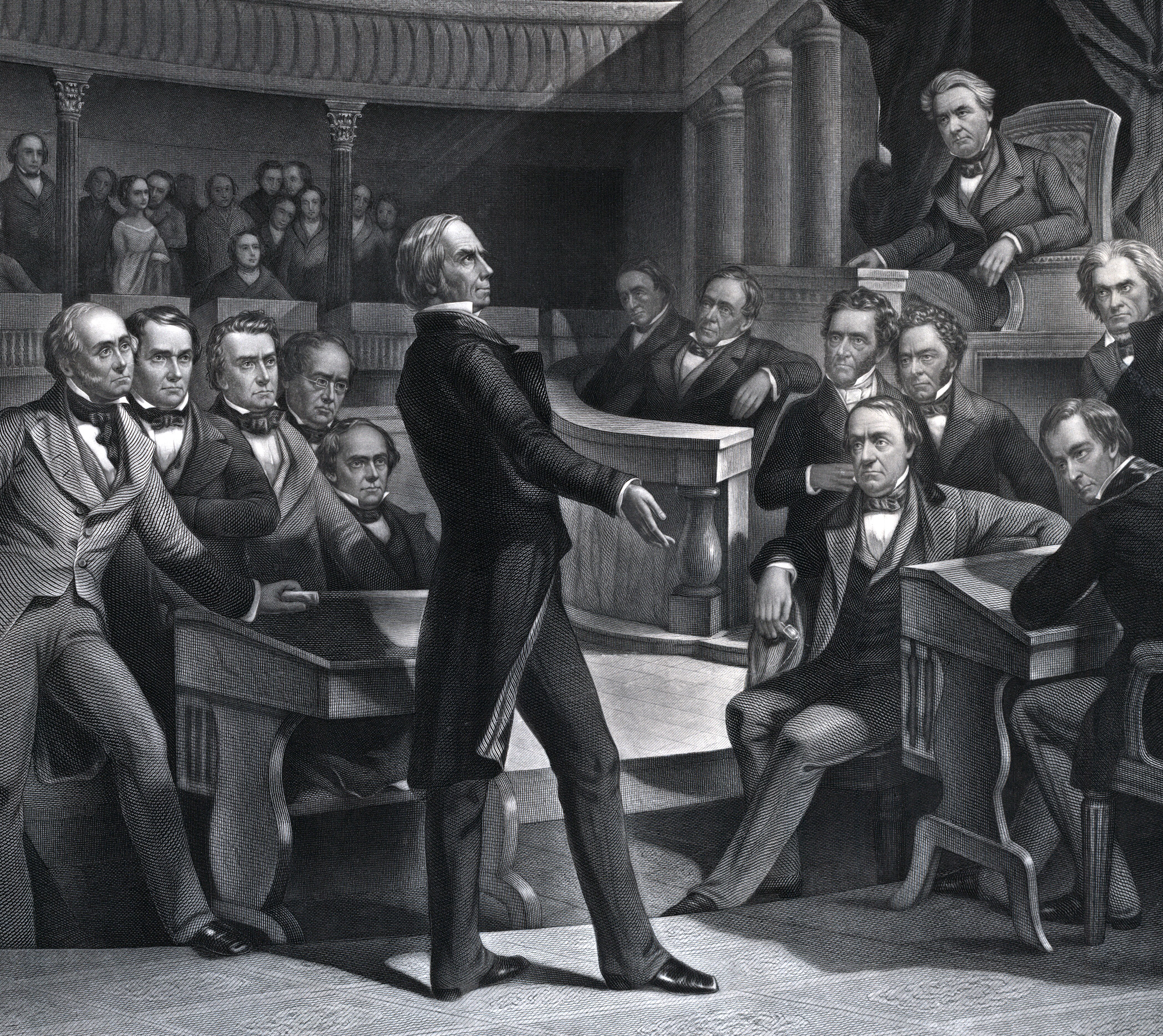
Henry Clay negotiated the 1826 treaty with the Kingdom of Denmark. He was part of the "Great Triumvirate," of Daniel Webster of Massachusetts, John C. Calhoun of South Carolina, and Clay of Kentucky.

=== 1826-1914 ===
During the Pierce administration, Pierce noted in a speech:

Negotiations are pending with Denmark to discontinue the practice of levying tolls on our vessels and their cargoes passing through the Sound. I do not doubt that we can claim exemption therefrom as a matter of right. It is admitted on all hands that this exaction is sanctioned, not by the general principles of the law of nations, but only by special conventions which most of the commercial nations have entered into with Denmark. The fifth article of our treaty of 1826 with Denmark provides that there shall not be paid on the vessels of the United States and their cargoes when passing through the Sound higher duties than those of the most favored nations. This may be regarded as an implied agreement to submit to the tolls during the continuance of the treaty, and consequently may embarrass the assertion of our right to be released therefrom. There are also other provisions in the treaty which ought to be modified. It was to remain in force for ten years and until one year after either party should give notice to the other of intention to terminate it. I deem it expedient that the contemplated notice should be given to the Government of Denmark.

During the American Civil War, Lincoln proposed to purchase the Danish West Indies to better maintain its blockade of the Confederacy. The United States Senate refused to go along, and negotiations continued intermittently for five more decades, but both sides had internal opposition.

=== World War I ===
Denmark was neutral in World War I, but suffered a significant disruption in trade, and decided its colonies were a financial burden, especially as the inhabitants were restive. The United States did not want Germany to purchase the islands of Saint Thomas, Saint Croix, and Saint John. In 1916, Denmark sold their Danish West Indies to the United States, and both countries signed the Treaty of the Danish West Indies. The sale for $25 million deal was finalized on 17 January 1917. On 31 March 1917, the United States took possession of the islands and the territory was renamed the Virgin Islands of the United States.

=== World War II ===
During World War II, in April 1941, the United States worked with Henrik Kauffmann, Denmark's ambassador to Washington, to establish a temporary protectorate over Greenland.

=== 1945–present ===
Agreement relating to the Defense of Greenland
Agreement Pursuant to the North Atlantic Treaty Between the Government of the United States of America and the Government of the Kingdom of Denmark Concerning the Defense of Greenland
- Type: Bilateral defense agreement
- Context: Cold War / Implementation of the North Atlantic Treaty
- Signed: 27 April 1951
- Location: Copenhagen, Denmark
- Effective: 8 June 1951
- Condition: Notification of Danish parliamentary approval
- Expiration: Co-extensive with the North Atlantic Treaty
- Signatories: (United States) Eugenie Anderson (Denmark) Ole Bjørn Kraft
- Parties: United States; Denmark
- Citations: TIAS 2292; 2 UST 1485
- Language: English, Danish

Full text
- Agreement relating to the Defense of Greenland at Wikisource

In 1947, the Danish Legation to the United States was upgraded to embassy status by President Truman.

Rejecting Denmark's long history of neutrality, it joined NATO as a founding member in 1949. Danish troops deployed to Bosnia and Herzegovina as part of the United Nations peacekeeping force were assigned to the American sector, coming under direct American command.

Denmark was active in Afghanistan from 2001-2021 and Kosovo as well as a leader in the Baltic region. Former Danish Prime Minister Anders Fogh Rasmussen reaffirmed that Denmark would remain engaged in Iraq even as its troop levels declined. Denmark was the only Scandinavian country to approve of the American Invasion of Iraq, and Denmark and the United States consult closely on European political and security matters. Denmark shares US views on the positive ramifications of NATO enlargement. Denmark is an active coalition partner in the war on terrorism, and Danish troops are supporting American-led stabilization efforts in Afghanistan and Iraq. The United States also engages Denmark in a broad cooperative agenda through the Enhanced Partnership in Northern Europe, a US policy structure to strengthen US–Nordic–Baltic policy and program coordination.

==== Russo-Ukrainian war ====
Denmark, a member of the European Union, sanctioned Russia after its invasion of Ukraine. In 2023, US President Joe Biden met with Danish Prime Minister Mette Frederiksen at the Oval Office and praised Denmark for "standing up" for Ukraine in war with Russia.

In the following days, Denmark, the United States, the United Kingdom, and the Netherlands released a joint statement on delivering 'high priority' air defence equipment to Ukraine.

==== Second Donald Trump administration (2025–present) ====
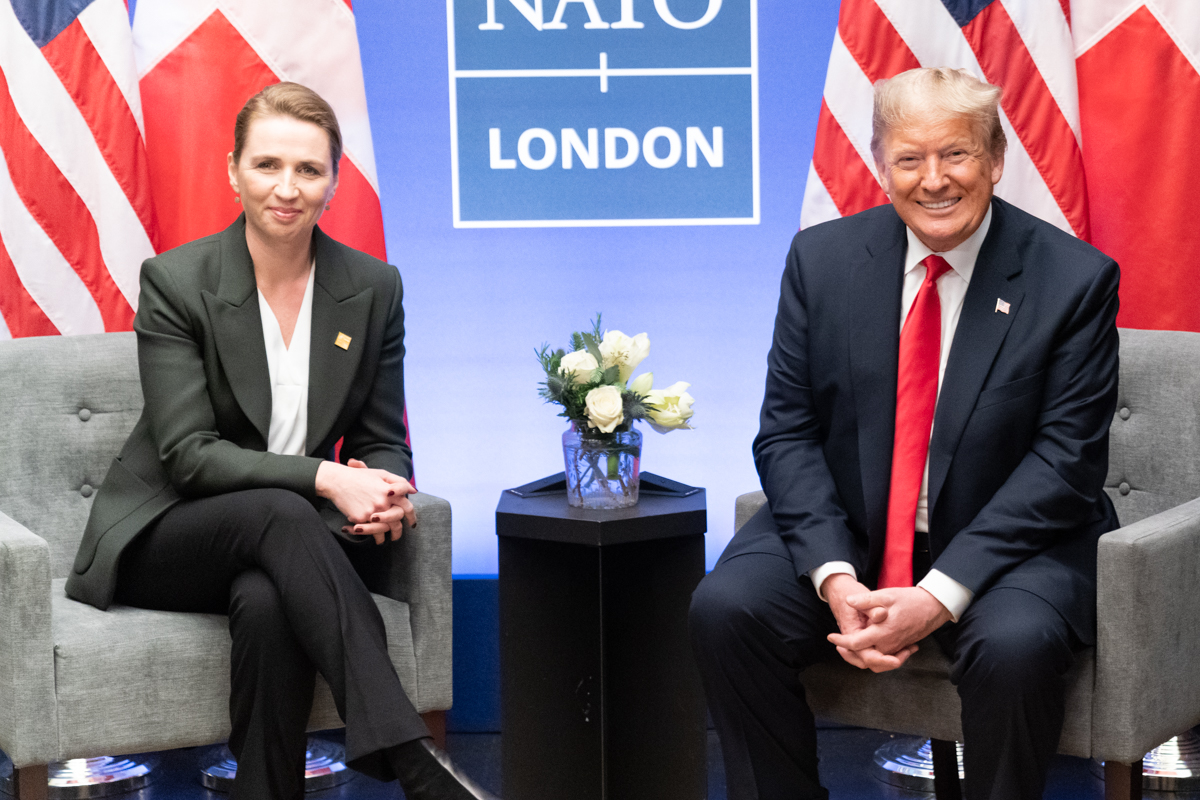
Danish Prime Minister Mette Frederiksen and US President Donald Trump at the 2019 London NATO summit

Donald Trump had expressed a desire to acquire Greenland for the United States in his second term. This was met with opposition from Danish Prime Minister Mette Frederiksen, who stated that "Europe won't be blackmailed" in response to President Trump, who had at that point not ruled out force to acquire Greenland.

The landmark treaty (Long Title: Agreement between the Government of the United States of America and the Government of the Kingdom of Denmark together with the Government of Greenland to Amend and Supplement the Agreement of 27 April 1951 Concerning the Defense of Greenland) was signed on 22 September 2026 under the backdrop of 81st United Nations Conference.

The treaty provides the United States with expedited approvals for security related physical infrastructure, two new defense bases, and embedded cooperation with Greenland authorities. These being above and beyond the concessions granted in the 1951 agreement.

2026 Agreement between the Government of the United States of America and the Government of the Kingdom of Denmark together with the Government of Greenland to Amend and Supplement the Agreement of 27 April 1951 Concerning the Defense of Greenland: Concessions Gained
Category	Concession Gained / Key Provision	Primary Beneficiary	Strategic Details
Military Base Expansion	Establishment of two new military bases	United States	New installations granted at Narsarsuaq (southern Greenland) and Mestersvig (east coast).
Military Base Expansion	Modernization of Pituffik Space Base	United States	Authorization granted to expand and modernize existing infrastructure at the United States' primary active base on the island.
Access & Transit Rights	Flyover & Landing Rights	United States	US military aircraft gain unrestricted transit and landing rights throughout all of Greenland.
Access & Transit Rights	Undersea & Maritime Rights	United States	US naval vessels gain comprehensive maritime and undersea operational rights in all Greenlandic territorial waters.
Access & Transit Rights	Permanent Security Control	United States	Solidifies long-term, permanent control over defense coordination, replacing the baseline framework constraints of the 1951 treaty.
Strategic Exclusion	Non-NATO Military Prohibition	NATO / All Parties	Explicitly bars non-NATO nations from establishing any military base or maintaining a troop presence on the island.
Strategic Exclusion	Foreign Investment Restrictions	United States / NATO	Prohibits non-allied nations and foreign adversaries from investing in Greenland's critical minerals and mining sectors.
Sovereignty & Independence	Independence Contingency Clause	Greenland / Denmark	If Greenland chooses independence in the future, it is legally bound to remain in NATO and seamlessly inherit all treaty rights and obligations.

United States–Denmark–Greenland Security Agreement
- Official name: Agreement between the Government of the United States of America and the Government of the Kingdom of Denmark together with the Government of Greenland to Amend and Supplement the Agreement of 27 April 1951 Concerning the Defense of Greenland
- Type: Defense and security pact
- Strategic context: Arctic security and strategic defense
- Date signed: September 22, 2026
- Place signed: New York City, United States (at the United Nations General Assembly)
- Effective: Pending parliamentary approval by Denmark and Greenland
- Parties: United States; Denmark; Greenland
- Signatories: (United States) Donald Trump (Denmark) Mette Frederiksen (Greenland) Jens-Frederik Nielsen
- Languages: English, Danish, Greenlandic
- Objective: Expand strategic Arctic defense integration; Modernize radar, early-warning, and communications arrays; Counter growing non-NATO influence and dual-use investments in the region
- Concessions (Beyond 1951 Agreement): Establishes new "Defense Areas" in Narsarsuaq and Mestersvig; Permits the deployment of offensive defensive assets at Pituffik Space Base (formerly Thule); Grants U.S. forces unimpeded access and operational control over assigned zones; Enforces strict investment screening on critical infrastructure and mining sectors
- Website: White House Statement
- Chronology: ← Igaliku Agreement (2004)

== Greenland ==
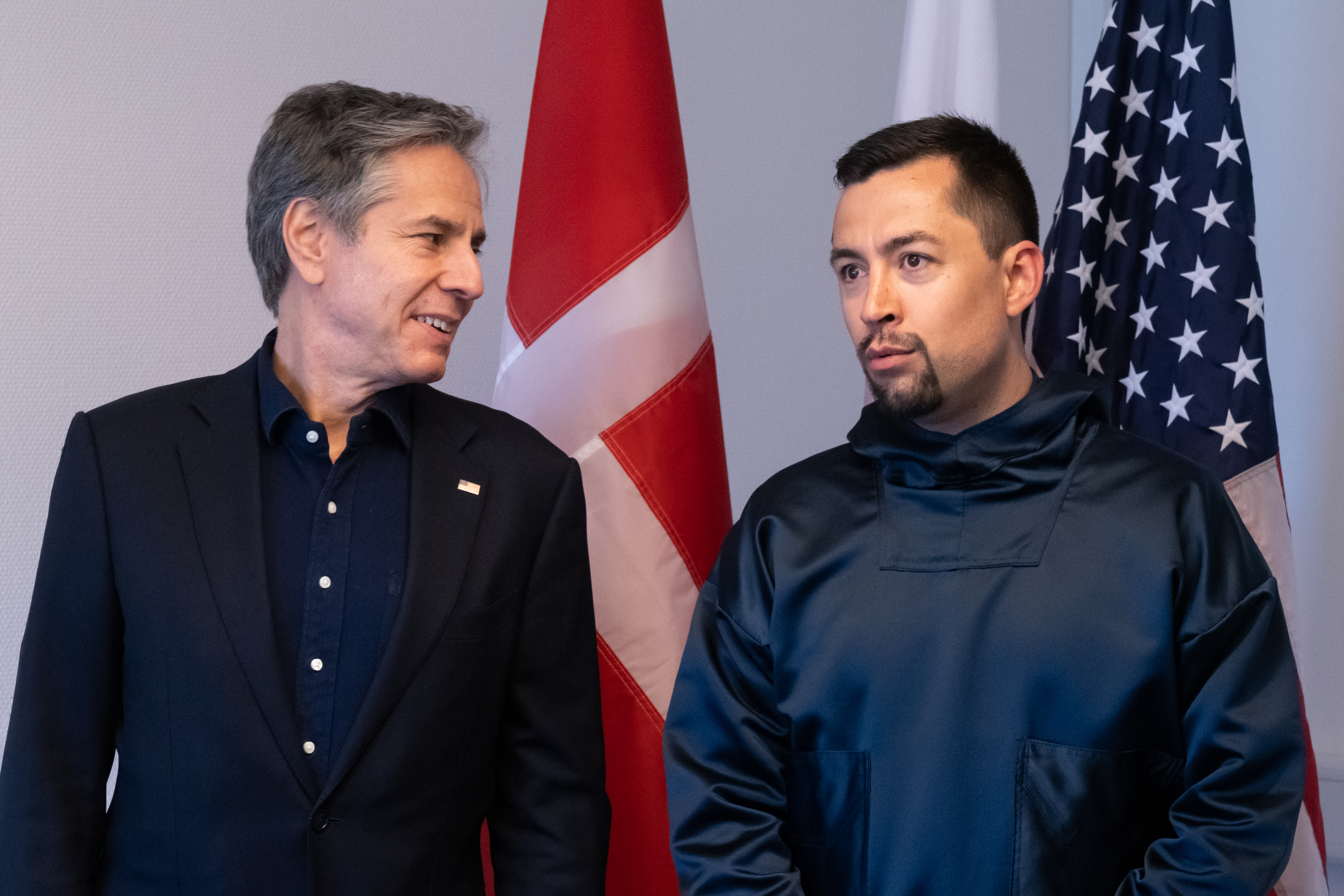
US Secretary of State Antony Blinken meets with Greenlandic Premier Múte Bourup Egede in 2021.

Shortly before the purchase of Alaska from the Russian Empire, United States Secretary of State William H. Seward attempted to buy both Greenland and Iceland from Denmark, but was unsuccessful.

Following World War II, the United States developed a geopolitical interest in Greenland, and in 1946, the United States offered to buy Greenland from Denmark for $100,000,000, but Denmark refused to sell.

Pituffik Space Base - the US Space Force base and early warning radar at Thule, North Star Bay, Greenland (a Danish self-governing territory) - serves as a vital link in western defenses. In August 2004, the Danish and Greenland Home Rule governments gave permission for the early warning radar to be updated in connection with a role in the US ballistic missile defense system. At the same time, agreements were signed to enhance economic, technical, and environmental cooperation between the United States and Greenland.

The United States expressed interest in investing in the resource base of Greenland and in tapping hydrocarbons off the Greenlandic coast. In August 2019, US President Donald Trump proposed to buy the country, prompting Greenlandic Prime Minister Kim Kielsen to issue the statement, "Greenland is not for sale and cannot be sold, but Greenland is open for trade and cooperation with other countries—including the United States."

On 10 June 2020, the United States reopened its consulate in Nuuk, Greenland. The first US consulate in Nuuk closed in 1953.

Following his re-election in 2024, Donald Trump posted on Truth Social, prior to taking office, that "For purposes of National Security and Freedom throughout the World, the United States of America feels that the ownership and control of Greenland is an absolute necessity", to which Prime Minister Múte Egede responded in a written comment: "Greenland is ours. We are not for sale and will never be for sale. We must not lose our long struggle for freedom." The US government's insistence on acquiring Greenland has caused diplomatic tensions between the two NATO members. It comes as Denmark is reassessing its relations with the United States. In its 2025 annual report, the Danish Defence Intelligence Service classified the United States as a potential threat to Denmark's and Europe's national security. The report mentions the use of economic weapons, especially tariffs, but also notes that Washington will no longer rule out the possibility of resorting to force, even against one of its partners.

=== 1968 Thule Air Base B-52 crash ===
The 1968 Thule Air Base B-52 crash was an accident on 21 January 1968, involving a US Air Force B-52 bomber. The aircraft was carrying four hydrogen bombs on a Cold War "Chrome Dome" alert mission over Baffin Bay when a cabin fire forced the crew to abandon the aircraft before they could carry out an emergency landing at Thule Air Base. Six crew members ejected safely, but one who did not have an ejection seat was killed while trying to bail out. The bomber crashed onto sea ice in North Star Bay, Greenland, causing the nuclear payload to rupture and disperse, which resulted in widespread radioactive contamination. The United States and Denmark launched an intensive clean-up and recovery operation, but the secondary of one of the nuclear weapons could not be accounted for after the operation completed.

=== Trump administrations ===
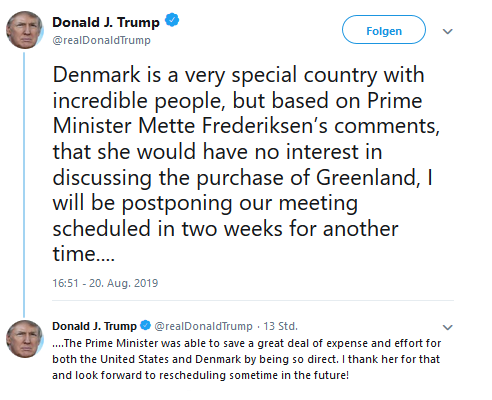
Tweet by Donald Trump announcing the postponement of his first visit to Denmark as president

In 2019, President Donald Trump discussed the idea of purchasing Greenland with senior advisers. Numerous Greenlandic and Danish politicians, including the Premier of Greenland and the Prime Minister of Denmark, rebuffed the idea, saying that the island is not for sale. A few days later, Trump abruptly postponed a planned state visit to Denmark just days before, citing their unwillingness to discuss his proposal of buying Greenland.

In late 2024, Trump wrote in Truth Social that the United States has an absolute necessity to own and control Greenland, citing reasons of "national security" and "freedom throughout the world." Trump's claims have been rejected by the Danish government, and 85% of Greenlandic adults surveyed oppose the move. Former first Trump presidency Department of Homeland Security (DHS) chief of staff, Miles Taylor, also indicated that Trump might consider swapping Puerto Rico for Greenland during his presidency.

On January 7, 2025, President-elect Trump stated that he was not ruling out military action to take control of Greenland, emphasizing its strategic importance to the United States but without providing specific details.

In a February 2025, interview with Maria Bartiromo on Fox News, US Vice President JD Vance stated that Denmark was "not being a good ally" and declared that "the US does not care what the EU screams at them" regarding Greenland. In the same interview, Vance falsely claimed that 55,000 citizens of Greenland want to be part of the US; a contemporary poll indicated that only six percent of Greenland's population supports the idea of joining the United States.

In early May 2025, the Danish government summoned the United States Ambassador to Denmark in response to a Wall Street Journal report that officials working for Director of National Intelligence Tulsi Gabbard had instructed the heads of the Central Intelligence Agency, National Security Agency and Defense Intelligence Agency to collect intelligence on Greenland's independence movement and the attitudes to American resource extraction efforts in the territory.

In late August 2025, the Danish government again summoned the US ambassador after at least three American citizens, allegedly with ties to Trump, were reported attempting covert operations to foment secessionism. DR reported that one American was attempting to gather a list of Greenlanders to recruit for a secessionist movement.

In December 2025, the Danish government once again summoned the US ambassador after Trump announced that Louisiana governor Jeff Landry was appointed as special envoy to Greenland. Landry said he will "make Greenland part of the U.S."

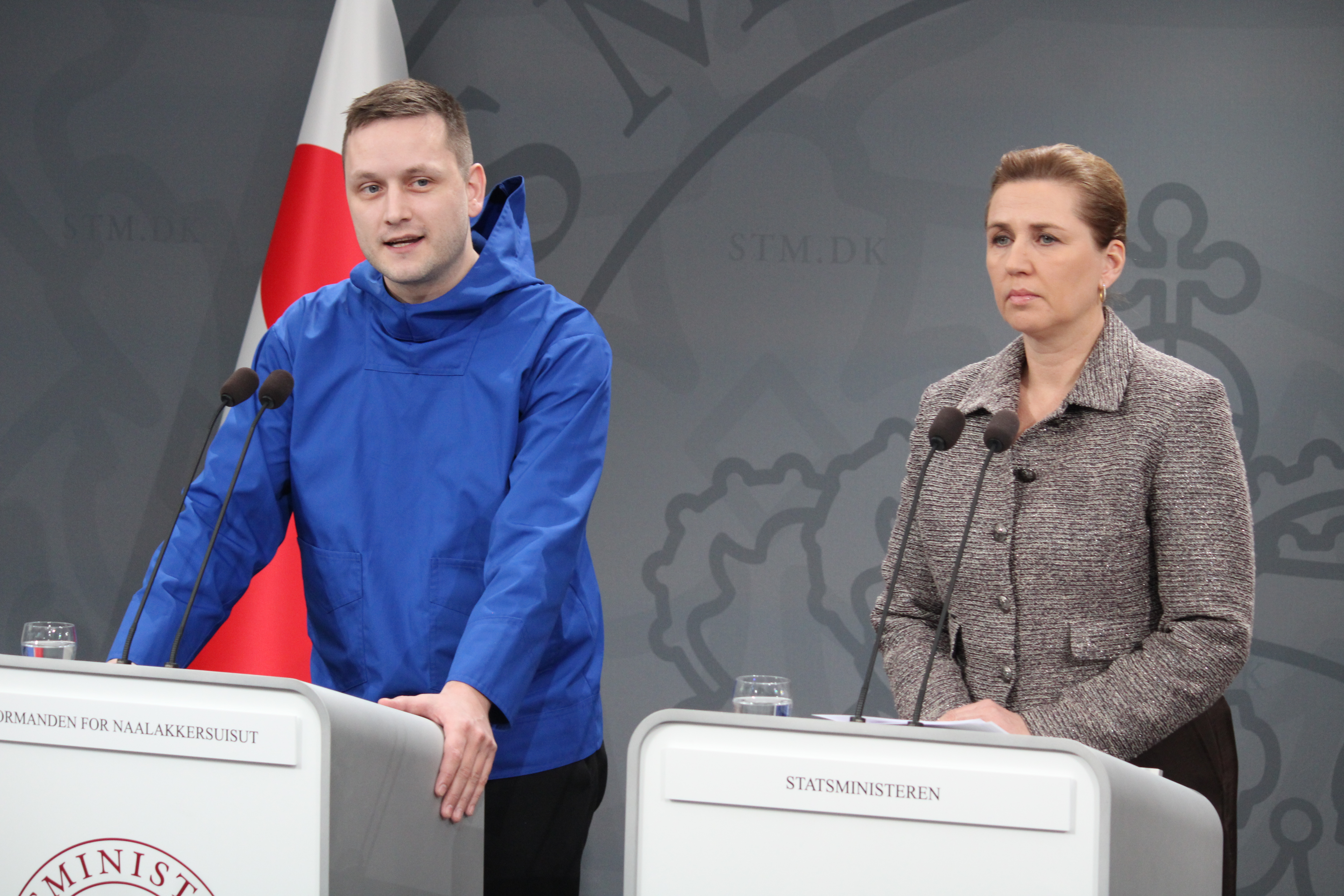
Greenlandic leader Jens Frederik-Nielsen announcing "We choose Denmark" at a January 2026 press conference with Mette Frederiksen in response to Trump's threats to invade or annex the country

In January 2026, Trump stated he would not rule out military force to take Greenland. This comment drew reactions immediately. Lars Løkke Rasmussen and Vivian Motzfeldt, the Foreign Ministers of Denmark and Greenland respectively, requested a meeting with US Secretary of State Marco Rubio. The Danish Prime Minister Mette Frederiksen warned that a US takeover of Greenland would end NATO. US allies in Europe released a statement saying, "Greenland belongs to its people. It is for Denmark and Greenland, and them only, to decide on matters concerning Denmark and Greenland." Hours later, the White House issued its own response. Trump called anything but a total takeover of Greenland "unacceptable" ahead of a meeting between the American and Danish foreign ministers.

On January 23, 2026, Danish Prime Minister Mette Frederiksen visited Greenland to express support for the people and the island's self-governing government, following comments by U.S. President Donald Trump indicating his willingness to annex the territory. Trump had previously discussed strengthening security in the Arctic region with NATO Secretary General Mark Rutte. Both the Danish and Greenlandic governments have affirmed that the island's sovereignty is indisputable but remain open to discussions on issues such as security and economic development. The crisis eased after Trump withdrew threats of force and new tariffs.

On September 18, 2026, Trump posted on Truth social that the United States and Denmark reached a deal where Denmark is handing the United States control over the security of Greenland.

== Trade ==
Denmark's active liberal trade policy in the European Union, Organisation for Economic Co-operation and Development, and World Trade Organization largely coincides with US interests. The US is Denmark's largest non-European trade partner with about 5% of Danish merchandise trade. Denmark's role in European environmental and agricultural issues and its strategic location at the entrance to the Baltic Sea have made Copenhagen a center for US agencies and the private sector dealing with the Nordic/Baltic region.

=== Trade balance ===
The following chart shows dollar figures from the US Census Bureau's Trade in Goods page. In positive columns, the US exported less than it imported.

== State visits ==
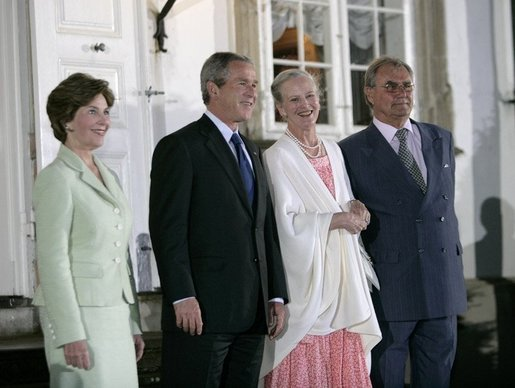
Queen Margrethe II and Prince Henrik of Denmark welcome George W. Bush and Laura Bush, 2005.

In 1967, Princess Margrethe and Prince Henrik visited the United States.

Former President Bill Clinton visited Denmark in July 1997, and again in 2005 and 2007. American President George W. Bush made an official visit to Copenhagen in July 2005, and Danish Prime Minister Anders Fogh Rasmussen met with Bush at Camp David in June 2006.

Former President Barack Obama and former First Lady Michelle Obama traveled to Denmark to support the Chicago bid for the 2016 Summer Olympics in October 2009, and in December 2009, Obama visited Denmark again for the 2009 United Nations Climate Change Conference. In March 2009, former Danish Foreign Minister Lene Espersen met former Secretary of State Hillary Clinton in the Gaza Donor Conference, and again in a NATO meeting in April 2010, where they met in Estonia.

In March 2009, Crown Prince Frederik and Princess Mary visited the Midwest. They visited The Danish Home in Chicago, and the Danish villages of Elk Horn, Ames, Kimballton and the Grand View University in Iowa. In Nebraska, the couple visited Dana College. "States like Iowa and Nebraska boast numerous examples of Danish settlements ... Both universities have made great strides to become highly recognized institutions of higher learning, as well as strengthening ties between Denmark and the United States", Crown Prince Frederik said.

On 9 March 2011, Obama met with former Danish Prime Minister Lars Løkke Rasmussen in the White House, where they discussed counter-terrorism, the Arab Spring and environmental issues.

On 30 March 2017, Rasmussen visited President Donald Trump in the United States. Discussion points were the state of the bilateral relations as well as counter-terrorism, economic opportunities, and NATO.

On 20 August 2019, President Donald Trump abruptly postponed a state visit to Denmark just days after the Danish Prime Minister Mette Frederiksen had declined Trump's offer to buy Greenland, saying that the island is not for sale.

== Resident diplomatic missions ==
- Denmark has an embassy in Washington, D.C., and has consulates-general in Chicago, Houston, New York City and Palo Alto. In March 2023, it was announced that Prince Joachim of Denmark would be moving to Washington to take up the role of defense industry attaché at the Danish Embassy from September 2023.
- United States has an embassy in Copenhagen and has a consulate in Nuuk, Greenland.
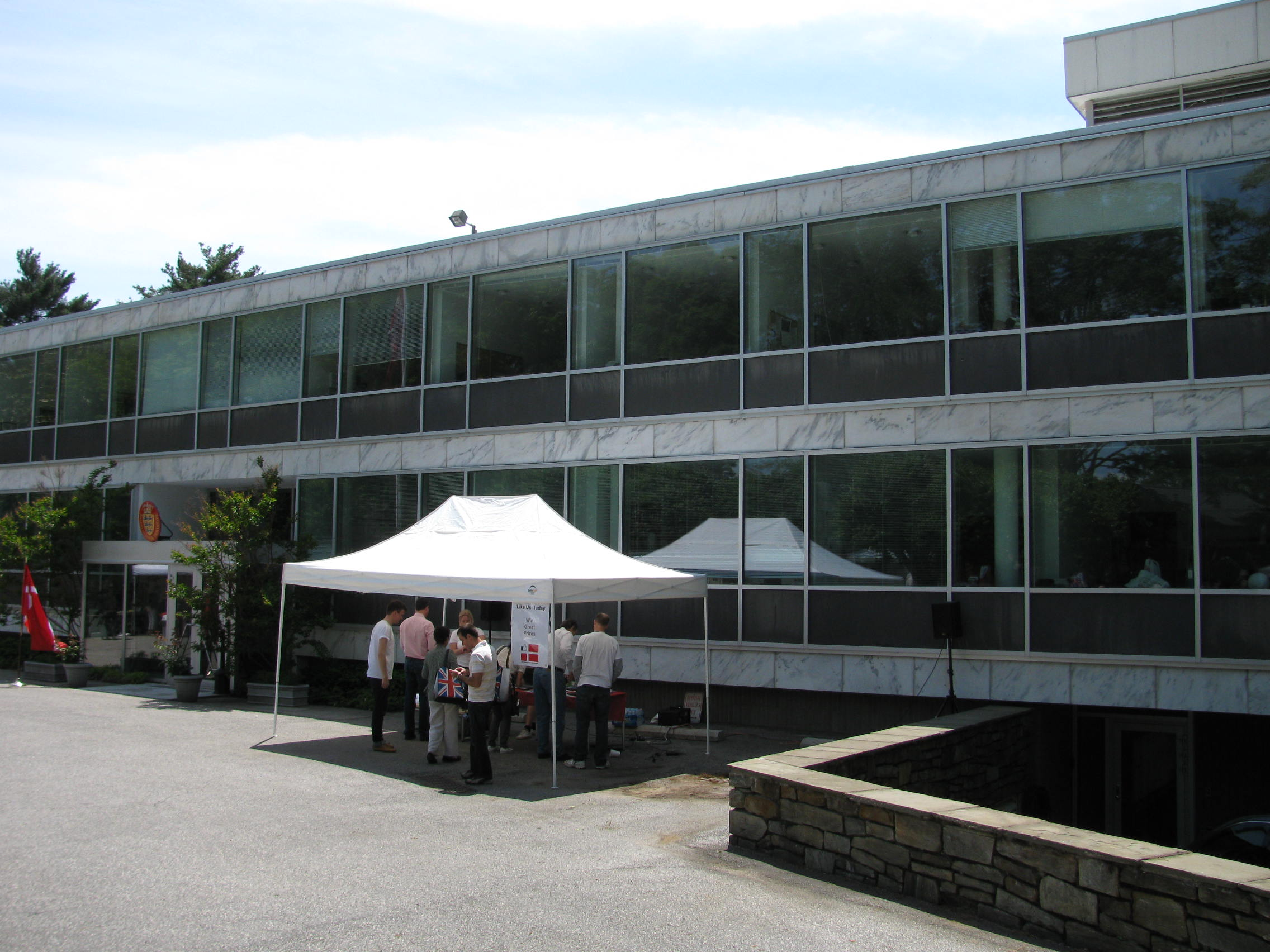
Embassy of Denmark in Washington, D.C.

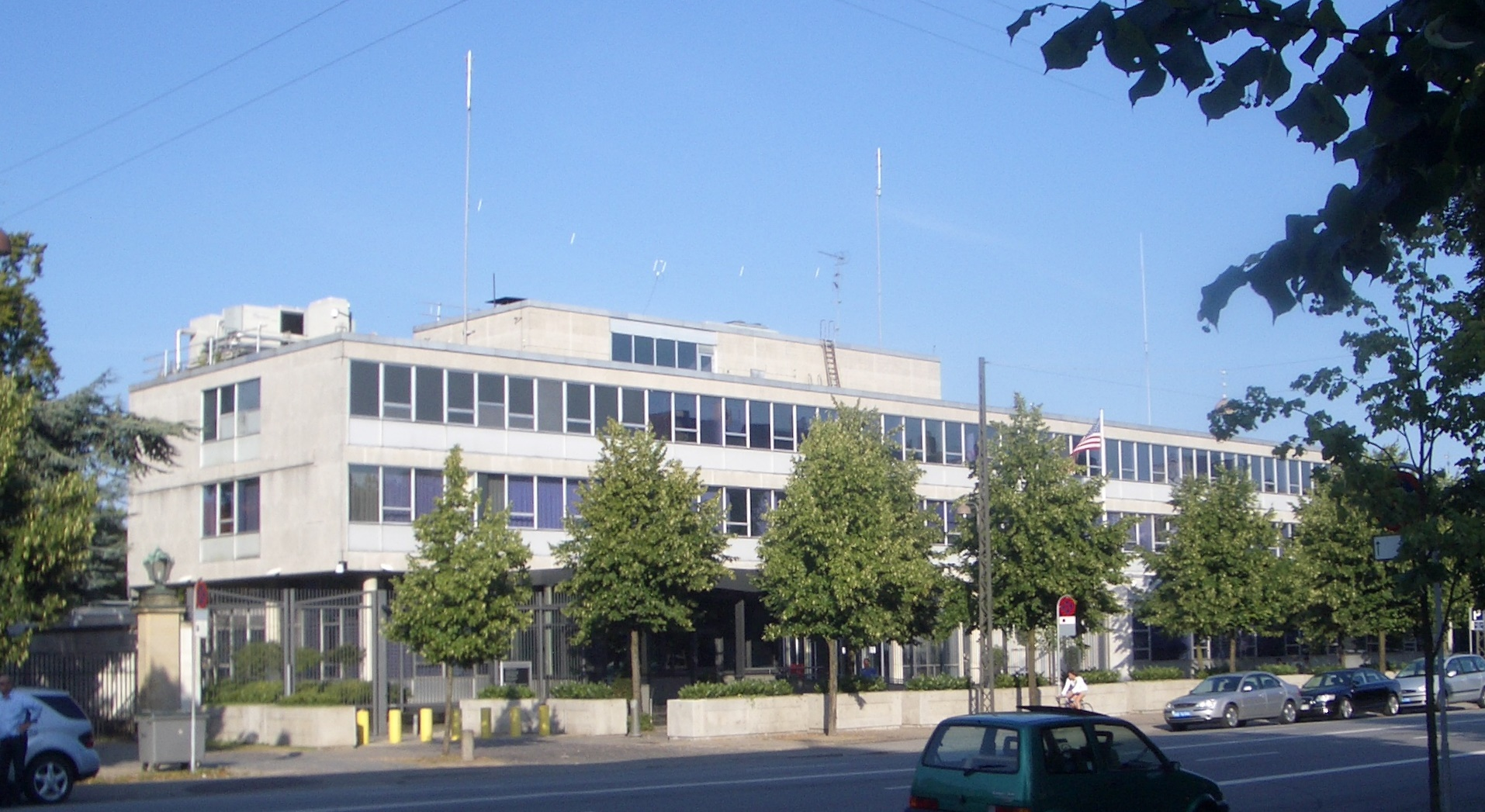
Embassy of the United States in Copenhagen

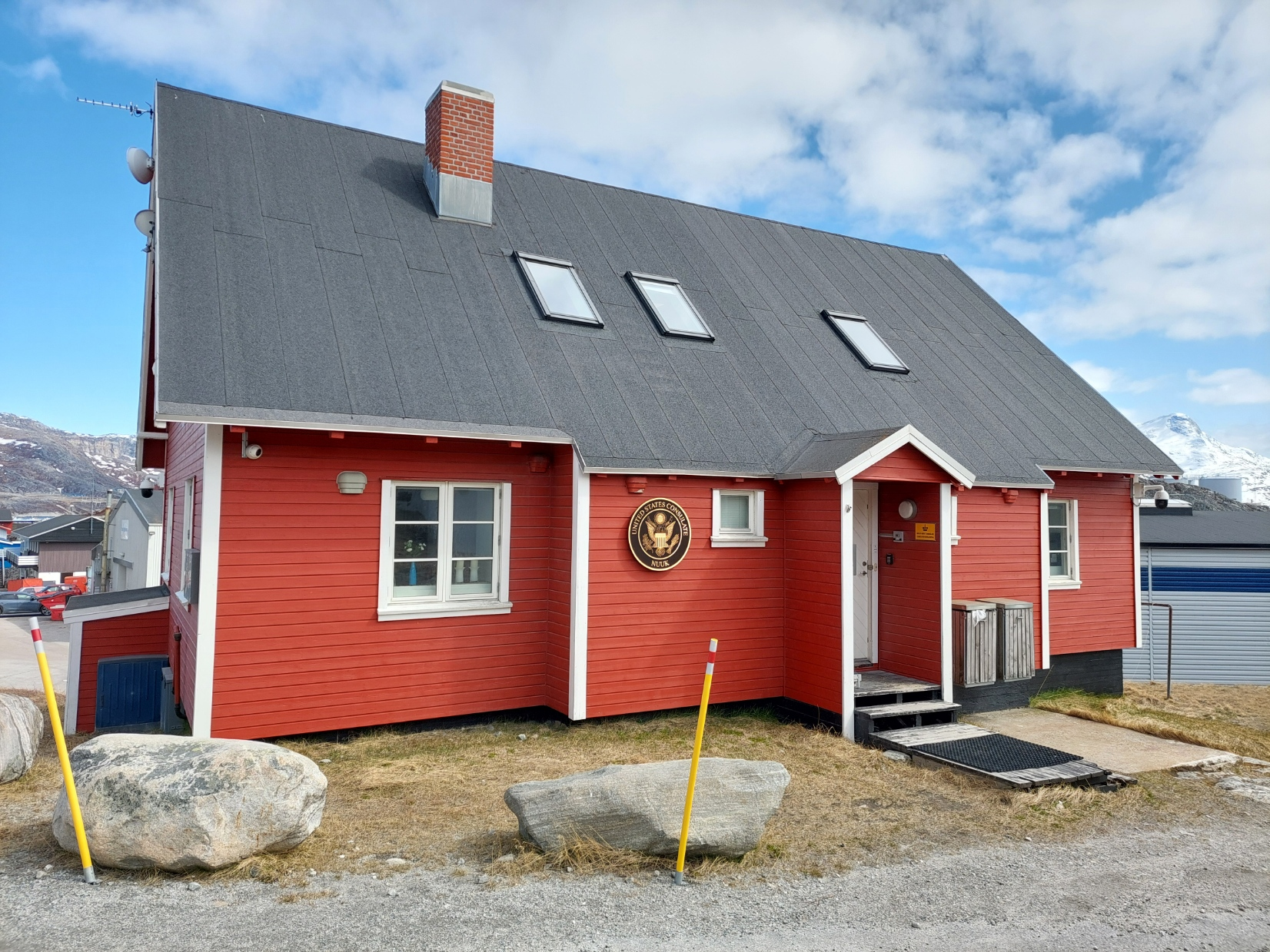
Consulate of the United States in Nuuk

== Table of key documents between the United States and Denmark ==
Key Bilateral Documents and Treaties between the United States and Denmark
Date Signed	Document Title	Key Scope / Summary	Wikisource / Source Link
April 26, 1826	Treaty of Friendship, Commerce, and Navigation	Established the foundational commercial, maritime, and diplomatic relations between the two nations, ensuring mutual most-favored-nation trading rights.	Wikisource
April 11, 1857	Treaty of Copenhagen (Sound Dues Convention)	Abolished the centuries-old "Sound Dues" transit taxes collected by Denmark on foreign ships passing through the Danish Straits; the U.S. agreed to a one-time compensatory payment.	Wikisource
April 17, 1914	Treaty for the Advancement of General Peace	Part of the "Bryan Peace Treaties," creating a commission to investigate international disputes between both nations before resorting to military action.	Wikisource
August 4, 1916	Treaty of the Danish West Indies	Ceded the Danish West Indies to the United States for $25 million (becoming the U.S. Virgin Islands). In an attached declaration, the U.S. formally recognized Danish sovereignty over all of Greenland.	Wikisource
April 9, 1941	Agreement relating to the Defense of Greenland (Kauffmann Treaty)	Signed by Danish Minister Henrik Kauffmann during the German occupation of Denmark; allowed the U.S. military to build bases and protect Greenland from Nazi interference.	Wikisource
June 29, 1948	Agreement Respecting Economic Cooperation	Facilitated the rollout of the Marshall Plan aid to post-WWII Denmark to support economic reconstruction.	State Dept
April 4, 1949	The North Atlantic Treaty	Multilateral pact making both countries founding members of the NATO collective defense framework.	Wikisource
April 27, 1951	1951 Greenland Defense Agreement	Superseded the 1941 pact under NATO auspices, granting the U.S. military extensive rights to build facilities (such as Thule/Pituffik Space Base) while explicitly preserving Danish sovereignty.	Wikisource
August 6, 2004	Igaliku Agreement	Modernized the 1951 defense pact to permit the upgrade of early-warning radar systems at Thule and formalized tripartite economic and environmental cooperation involving Greenland's Home Rule government.	State Dept
August 19, 2009	Agreement on Science and Technology Cooperation	Formulated structured technical and scientific collaboration between U.S. and Danish research bodies in clean energy, physics, and climate initiatives.	State Dept
December 21, 2023	Defense Cooperation Agreement (DCA)	Created a modern bilateral security framework under the NATO Status of Forces Agreement (SOFA), establishing conditions for U.S. forces operating on the Danish mainland.	State Dept
September 22, 2026	Greenland Defense Amendment & Supplement Agreement	Trilateral pact (U.S., Denmark, and Greenland) updating the 1951 framework to expand North Atlantic and Arctic security infrastructure, establishing long-term defensive safeguards against non-NATO infrastructure investment.	White House

== See also ==
- Danish Americans
- List of ambassadors of Denmark to the United States
- List of ambassadors of the United States to Denmark
- Greenland crisis
