= Christian Dyvig =

Danish lawyer, businessman and investor

Christian Peter Dyvig (born 11 October 1964) is a Danish lawyer, businessman and investor. He is the CEO and founder of C. P. Dyvig & Co. and Dyvig Holdings in Copenhagen.

== Career ==
Dyvig obtained a LL:M: degree from University of Copenhagen in 1987. He then practiced as a lawyer at Reumert & Partnere and served as an external lecturer in Human Rights at University of Copenhagen until 1992 when he went to Switzerland where he obtained an MBA with honours from the International Institute for Management Development in 1993. From October 1993 he worked for Morgan Stanley in London and later Frankfurt where he served as a Managing Director in the Mergers and Acquisitions Department where he headed first the Nordic and later the German activity. He was a partner in Nordic Capital from 2003 to 2009 and was involved in the private equity firms’s investments in Falck and Nycomed. In 2009 he established his own firm C. P. Dyvig & Co. and in 2011 he became CEO of Lundbeckfonden. Dyvig left Lundbeckfonden in 2014 to focus on private investments after he bought Kompan alongside management and pension fund PFA.

== Private life ==
Christian Dyvig is the son of Peter Dyvig, a former Danish ambassador to London, Washington and Paris. He is married to lawyer Mia F. Stefansen and lives in Copenhagen. His interests include ballet and he is a board member of the Royal Danish Ballet's Foundation.
