= Peter Taksøe-Jensen =

Danish diplomat

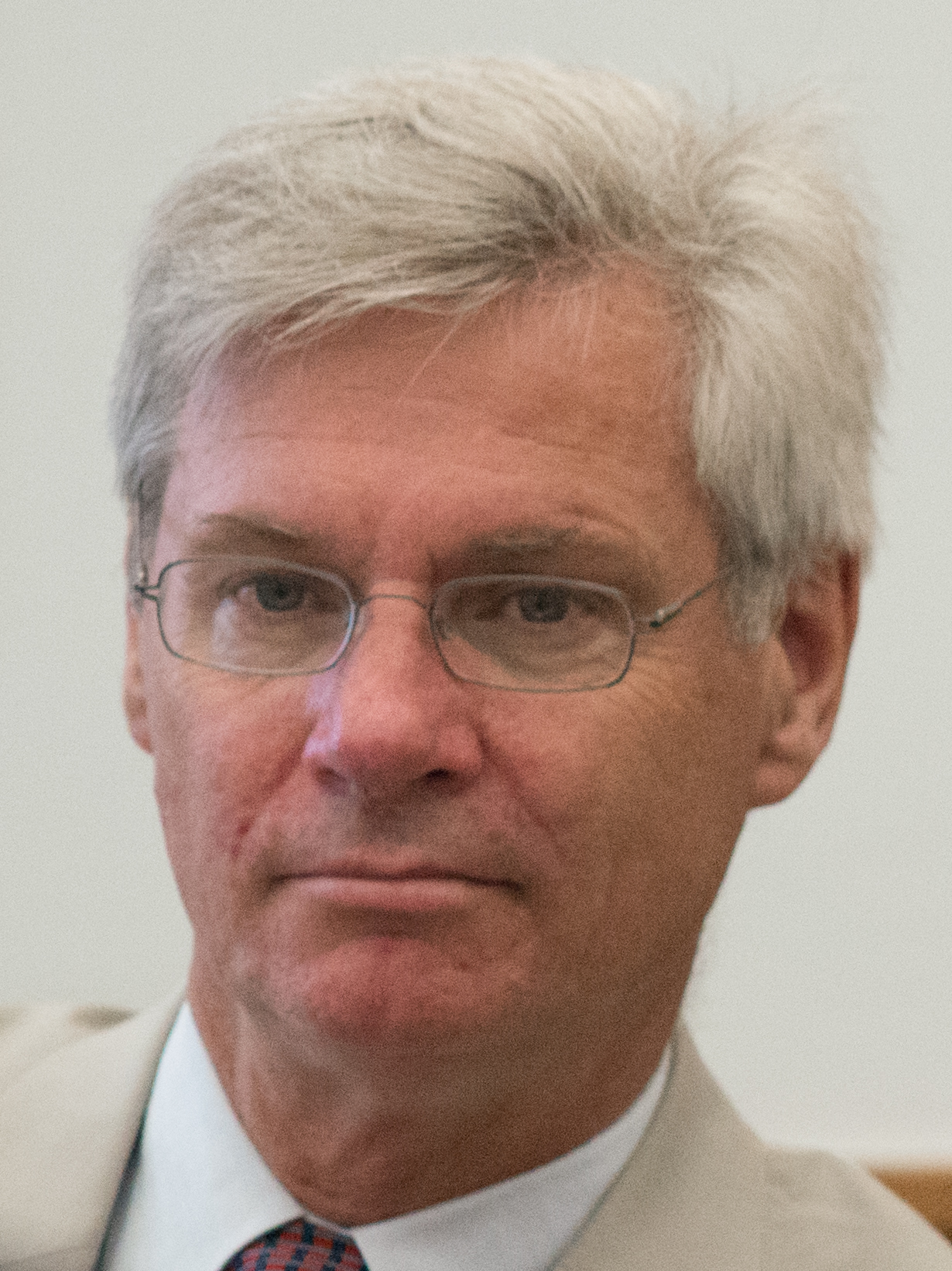
Peter Taksøe-Jensen in 2014

Peter Taksøe-Jensen (born in 1959 in Copenhagen, Denmark) is a Danish diplomat. He has been the Danish Ambassador to Japan since 2019. The Ambassador represents the government of Denmark in Japan and is responsible for the direction and work of the Embassy.

== Early life and education ==
Taksøe-Jensen is from a family of jurists, being the son of the late professor, dr.jur. Finn Taksøe-Jensen (1934–2020). He obtained his law degree in 1986 from the University of Copenhagen

== Career ==
Following graduation, Taksøe-Jensen joined the international law department of the Danish Ministry of Foreign Affairs in 1987. He worked in different areas in the ministry including the Legal Service, the Security Policy Department and the European Union Law Department and on various government commissions. He was posted to different places including to Vienna and to Brussels. Taksøe-Jensen served as Under-Secretary for Legal Affairs and Head of the Legal Service in the Danish Ministry from 2004.

In 2008, Taksøe-Jensen was by appointed by UN Secretary-General Ban Ki-moon as Assistant Secretary-General for Legal Affairs at the United Nations, replacing Larry Johnson. In this capacity, he was responsible for supporting the overall direction and management of the United Nations Office of Legal Affairs.

Before his current post, Taksøe-Jensen was Denmark's Ambassador to the United States from 2010 to 2015 and to India from 2015 to 2019.

From 2016 to 2018, Taksøe-Jensen was chairman of a conciliation commission established under the United Nations Convention on the Law of the Sea to resolve a long-running maritime border dispute between Australia and Timor-Leste. In 2026, he was one of two conciliators appointed by Cambodia for a compulsory conciliation process under the United Nations Convention on the Law of the Sea (UNCLOS) it had initiated to resolve ‌a long-running maritime dispute with Thailand.

== Recognition ==
On 16 April 2007, Taksøe-Jensen received the Order of the Dannebrog Knight 1st Class.
