= 2025 Greve municipal election =

Municipal election in Denmark

| ← 2021 | 18 November 2025 | 2029 → |

All 21 seats to the Greve municipal council 11 seats needed for a majority
- Turnout: 28,526 (68.6%) ▲3.1%
| | First party | Second party | Third party |
|---|---|---|---|
| | V | A | O |
| Party | Venstre | Social Democrats | Danish People's Party |
| Last election | 9 seats, 37.7% | 6 seats, 27.3% | 1 seat, 6.2% |
| Seats won | 8 | 6 | 2 |
| Seat change | ▼1 | 0 | ▲1 |
| Popular vote | 9,114 | 6,308 | 2,403 |
| Percentage | 32.4% | 22.4% | 8.5% |
| Swing | ▼5.3% | ▼4.9% | ▲2.4% |
| | Fourth party | Fifth party | Sixth party |
| | C | I | Ø |
| Party | Conservatives | Liberal Alliance | Red-Green Alliance |
| Last election | 2 seats, 12.0% | 0 seats, 0.7% | 1 seat, 4.5% |
| Seats won | 2 | 1 | 1 |
| Seat change | 0 | ▲1 | 0 |
| Popular vote | 2,197 | 2,173 | 1,963 |
| Percentage | 7.8% | 7.7% | 7.0% |
| Swing | ▼4.2% | ▲7.0% | ▲2.5% |
| | Seventh party |
| | F |
| Party | Green Left |
| Last election | 1 seat, 3.8% |
| Seats won | 1 |
| Seat change | 0 |
| Popular vote | 1,400 |
| Percentage | 5.0% |
| Swing | ▲1.2% |
Mayor before election
Pernille Beckmann
Venstre
Mayor after election
Pernille Beckmann
Venstre

The 2025 Greve Municipal election was held on November 18, 2025, to elect the 21 members to sit in the regional council for the Greve Municipal council, in the period of 2026 to 2029. Pernille Beckmann from Venstre, would secure re-election.

== Background ==
Following the 2021 election, Pernille Beckmann from Venstre became mayor for her third term. She would run a fourth term.

== Electoral system ==
For elections to Danish municipalities, a number varying from 9 to 31 are chosen to be elected to the municipal council. The seats are then allocated using the D'Hondt method and a closed list proportional representation. Greve Municipality had 21 seats in 2025.

== Electoral alliances ==
=== Electoral Alliance 1 ===
| Party | | Political alignment |
|---|---|---|
| A | Social Democrats | Centre-left |
| B | Social Liberals | Centre to Centre-left |
| E | Lokallisten Mennesker Først | Local politics |
| F | Green Left | Centre-left to Left-wing |
| Ø | Red-Green Alliance | Left-wing to Far-Left |

=== Electoral Alliance 2 ===
| Party | | Political alignment |
|---|---|---|
| C | Conservatives | Centre-right |
| U | Jesper Løvenbalk Fisker | Local politics |
| Æ | Denmark Democrats | Right-wing to Far-right |

=== Electoral Alliance 3 ===
| Party | | Political alignment |
|---|---|---|
| I | Liberal Alliance | Centre-right to Right-wing |
| O | Danish People's Party | Right-wing to Far-right |

=== Electoral Alliance 4 ===
| Party | | Political alignment |
|---|---|---|
| K | Christian Democrats | Centre to Centre-right |
| L | Vores Lokalliste | Local politics |
| M | Moderates | Centre to Centre-right |
| V | Venstre | Centre-right |

== Results by polling station ==
| Division | A | B | C | E | F | I | K | L | M | O | U | V | Æ | Ø |
| Division | % | % | % | % | % | % | % | % | % | % | % | % | % | % |
|---|---|---|---|---|---|---|---|---|---|---|---|---|---|---|
| Arenaskolen ved Greve Kultur-Base | 26.6 | 2.0 | 9.0 | 1.1 | 5.1 | 5.8 | 0.2 | 2.5 | 0.8 | 11.7 | 0.2 | 22.8 | 1.3 | 10.9 |
| Greve Idrætscenter | 21.1 | 2.9 | 8.5 | 1.1 | 4.8 | 8.9 | 0.1 | 2.0 | 1.0 | 7.9 | 0.4 | 32.6 | 1.3 | 7.3 |
| Mosedeskolen | 21.2 | 2.7 | 9.0 | 1.2 | 4.4 | 10.6 | 0.1 | 2.5 | 1.2 | 6.5 | 0.1 | 36.6 | 0.7 | 3.2 |
| Karlslundehallerne | 19.4 | 2.5 | 9.5 | 1.0 | 5.6 | 8.8 | 0.1 | 2.6 | 1.6 | 6.6 | 0.2 | 37.7 | 1.4 | 3.0 |
| Tunehallerne | 21.5 | 1.7 | 4.4 | 2.0 | 4.0 | 4.8 | 0.1 | 3.4 | 0.7 | 8.5 | 0.1 | 43.4 | 1.9 | 3.4 |
| Holmeagerskolen | 24.9 | 2.4 | 7.5 | 1.2 | 5.8 | 8.8 | 0.1 | 3.2 | 0.8 | 9.4 | 0.2 | 28.6 | 1.3 | 5.7 |
| Sundhedshuset | 26.1 | 4.6 | 5.2 | 0.6 | 5.2 | 4.9 | 0.2 | 1.7 | 0.9 | 11.3 | 0.1 | 18.1 | 1.8 | 19.4 |

== Results ==
| Party | | Votes | % | +/- | Seats | +/- |
Greve Municipality
| V | Venstre | 9,114 | 32.41 | -5.29 | 8 | -1 |
| A | Social Democrats | 6,308 | 22.43 | -4.90 | 6 | 0 |
| O | Danish People's Party | 2,403 | 8.54 | +2.36 | 2 | +1 |
| C | Conservatives | 2,197 | 7.81 | -4.22 | 2 | 0 |
| I | Liberal Alliance | 2,173 | 7.73 | +6.98 | 1 | +1 |
| Ø | Red-Green Alliance | 1,963 | 6.98 | +2.51 | 1 | 0 |
| F | Green Left | 1,400 | 4.98 | +1.22 | 1 | 0 |
| B | Social Liberals | 748 | 2.66 | +0.54 | 0 | 0 |
| L | Vores Lokalliste | 712 | 2.53 | New | 0 | New |
| Æ | Denmark Democrats | 386 | 1.37 | New | 0 | New |
| E | Lokallisten Mennesker Først | 331 | 1.18 | New | 0 | New |
| M | Moderates | 290 | 1.03 | New | 0 | New |
| U | Jesper Løvenbalk Fisker | 61 | 0.22 | New | 0 | New |
| K | Christian Democrats | 36 | 0.13 | -0.28 | 0 | 0 |
| Total | | 28,122 | 100 | N/A | 21 | N/A |
| Invalid votes | | 99 | 0.24 | -0.04 | | |
| Blank votes | | 305 | 0.73 | +0.25 | | |
| Turnout | | 28,526 | 68.56 | +3.14 | | |
Source: valg.dk

== Opinion polls ==
| Polling firm | Fieldwork date | Sample size | V | A | C | O | Ø | F | B | I | K | E | L | M | U | Æ | Others | Lead |
|---|---|---|---|---|---|---|---|---|---|---|---|---|---|---|---|---|---|---|
| Epinion | 4 Sep - 13 Oct 2025 | 493 | 34.0 | 22.3 | 9.1 | 9.4 | 3.2 | 6.2 | 2.2 | 7.4 | – | – | – | 3.3 | – | 1.7 | 1.3 | 11.7 |
| 2024 european parliament election | 9 Jun 2024 | | 19.2 | 16.7 | 10.2 | 9.0 | 4.1 | 11.6 | 5.7 | 8.5 | – | – | – | 8.1 | – | 5.1 | – | 2.5 |
| 2022 general election | 1 Nov 2022 | | 19.3 | 26.3 | 4.8 | 4.0 | 2.2 | 6.7 | 2.7 | 8.5 | 0.3 | – | – | 12.7 | – | 6.2 | – | 7.0 |
| 2021 regional election | 16 Nov 2021 | | 30.9 | 29.2 | 13.4 | 5.8 | 4.5 | 5.0 | 3.1 | 1.7 | 0.7 | – | – | – | – | – | – | 1.7 |
| 2021 municipal election | 16 Nov 2021 | | 37.7 (9) | 27.3 (6) | 12.0 (2) | 6.2 (1) | 4.5 (1) | 3.8 (1) | 2.1 (0) | 0.7 (0) | 0.4 (0) | – | – | – | – | – | – | 10.4 |
