= 2021 Greve municipal election =

← 2017	16 November 2021	2025 →

All 21 seats to the Greve Municipal Council 11 seats needed for a majority
- Turnout: 25,727 (64.6%) ▼5.7pp
	First party	Second party	Third party
	V	A	C
Party	Venstre	Social Democrats	Conservatives
Last election	9 seats, 36.6%	7 seats, 28.9%	1 seat, 5.1%
Seats won	9	6	2
Seat change	0	▼1	▲1
Popular vote	9,575	6,941	3,055
Percentage	37.7%	27.3%	12.0%
Swing	▲1.1%	▼1.6%	▲6.9%
	Fourth party	Fifth party	Sixth party
	O	Ø	D
Party	Danish People's Party	Red–Green Alliance	New Right
Last election	2 seats, 12.0%	1 seat, 4.1%	0 seats, 1.3%
Seats won	1	1	1
Seat change	▼1	0	▲1
Popular vote	1,570	1,136	974
Percentage	6.2%	4.5%	3.8%
Swing	▼5.8%	▲0.4%	▲2.5%
	Seventh party	Eighth party
	F	I
Party	Green Left	Liberal Alliance
Last election	0 seats, 2.5%	1 seat, 3.3%
Seats won	1	0
Seat change	▲1	▼1
Popular vote	954	189
Percentage	3.8%	0.7%
Swing	▲1.3%	▼2.6%
Mayor before election
Pernille Beckmann
Venstre
Mayor after election
Pernille Beckmann
Venstre

Since the 2007 municipal reform, only parties of the blue bloc had held the mayor's position in Greve Municipality. Current mayor coming into this election was Pernille Beckmann from Venstre, who had been mayor following the 2013 election and the 2017 election . In the 2017 election, the blue bloc had won 13 of the 21 seats.

In this election, no dramatic changes occurred. The Social Democrats, Liberal Alliance and Danish People's Party would all lose a seat. The Conservatives gained 1 seat, but did not come anywhere near the 9 seats Venstre won, despite having held the mayor's position before in the municipality. The New Right would win representation with 1 seat for the first time in the party's history, while the Green Left would win representation with 1 seat, for the first time since the 2009 election. Again the blue bloc had won 13 seats, and Pernille Beckmann looked likely to continue for a third term. This would later be confirmed.

== Electoral system ==
For elections to Danish municipalities, a number varying from 9 to 31 are chosen to be elected to the municipal council. The seats are then allocated using the D'Hondt method and a closed list proportional representation. Greve Municipality had 21 seats in 2021

Unlike in Danish General Elections, in elections to municipal councils, electoral alliances are allowed.

== Electoral alliances ==
=== Electoral Alliance 1 ===
Party		Political alignment
C	Conservatives	Centre-right
K	Christian Democrats	Centre to Centre-right

=== Electoral Alliance 2 ===
Party		Political alignment
D	New Right	Right-wing to Far-right
I	Liberal Alliance	Centre-right to Right-wing
O	Danish People's Party	Right-wing to Far-right
V	Venstre	Centre-right

=== Electoral Alliance 3 ===
Party		Political alignment
B	Social Liberals	Centre to Centre-left
F	Green Left	Centre-left to Left-wing
G	Vegan Party	Single-issue
Ø	Red–Green Alliance	Left-wing to Far-Left

== Results by polling station ==
W = Party Parti

Division	A	B	C	D	F	G	I	K	O	V	W	Ø
Division	%	%	%	%	%	%	%	%	%	%	%	%
Arenaskolen	34.6	1.6	13.7	4.7	3.2	0.3	0.4	0.4	7.3	25.8	1.4	6.6
Greve Idrætscenter	29.2	2.4	11.9	3.6	3.7	0.2	0.6	0.4	6.2	33.8	1.5	6.5
Mosedeskolen	22.9	2.3	14.3	3.7	3.5	0.1	0.8	0.1	5.7	43.2	0.9	2.3
Karlslunde Hallerne	21.7	2.0	12.4	3.8	4.1	0.2	1.3	0.7	5.5	45.3	0.7	2.5
Tune Hallerne	28.9	1.5	8.5	4.1	4.1	0.2	0.6	0.3	6.8	41.7	1.4	2.0

== Results ==
Party		Votes	%	+/-	Seats	+/-
Greve Municipality
V	Venstre	9,575	37.70	+1.11	9	0
A	Social Democrats	6,941	27.33	-1.58	6	-1
C	Conservatives	3,055	12.03	+6.88	2	+1
O	Danish People's Party	1,570	6.18	-5.86	1	-1
Ø	Red-Green Alliance	1,136	4.47	+0.42	1	0
D	New Right	974	3.84	+2.51	1	+1
F	Green Left	954	3.76	+1.29	1	+1
B	Social Liberals	539	2.12	+0.62	0	0
W	Party Parti	314	1.24	New	0	New
I	Liberal Alliance	189	0.74	-2.51	0	-1
K	Christian Democrats	103	0.41	+0.13	0	0
G	Vegan Party	47	0.19	New	0	New
Total		25,397	100	N/A	21	N/A
Invalid votes		110	0.28	+0.18		
Blank votes		220	0.56	-0.14		
Turnout		25,727	65.41	-5.90		
Source: valg.dk
