= Outline of the Danish Armed Forces at the end of the Cold War =

Order of battle as of 1989

The following is a hierarchical outline for the Danish armed forces at the end of the Cold War. It is intended to convey the connections and relationships between units and formations. In wartime all Danish military units would have come under the joint West German/Danish NATO command Allied Forces Baltic Approaches (BALTAP). BALTAP was a principal subordinate command under the Allied Forces Northern Europe Command (AFNORTH). The commander-in-chief of (BALTAP) was always a Danish Lieutenant General or Vice Admiral, who had the designation Commander Allied Forces Baltic Approaches (COMBALTAP). In peacetime BALTAP had only a few communication units allocated and all other units remained under national command of West Germany's Bundeswehr and Denmark's Forsvaret.

== Forsvaret ==
Forsvaret (Danish Defence) was the unified armed forces of the Kingdom of Denmark, charged with the defence of Denmark and its overseas territories of Greenland and the Faroe Islands. Forsvaret had four service branches:

- Royal Danish Army
- Royal Danish Navy
- Royal Danish Air Force
- Danish Home Guard

The Forsvaret headquarters also had operational control of the following entities:

- Danish Defence Intelligence Service
  - Dueodde SIGINT station, on Bornholm
- Royal Danish Defence College
- Judge Advocate Corps
- Lyngby Radio

=== Royal Danish Army ===
The Royal Danish Army Command was based in Karup and tasked to train, maintain and prepare the army for war. However operational control in peacetime rested with the Western and the Eastern Regional Command. In wartime the former would have transferred its units to LANDJUT, while the latter would have become the LANDZEALAND command.

- Royal Danish Army, Karup
  - Jaegerkorpset, at Aalborg Air Base, (Long range reconnaissance and special operations)
  - Army Material Command, Hjørring
    - Army Depot Service
    - Army Maintenance Service
    - Army Ammunition Arsenal

==== Western Regional Command ====
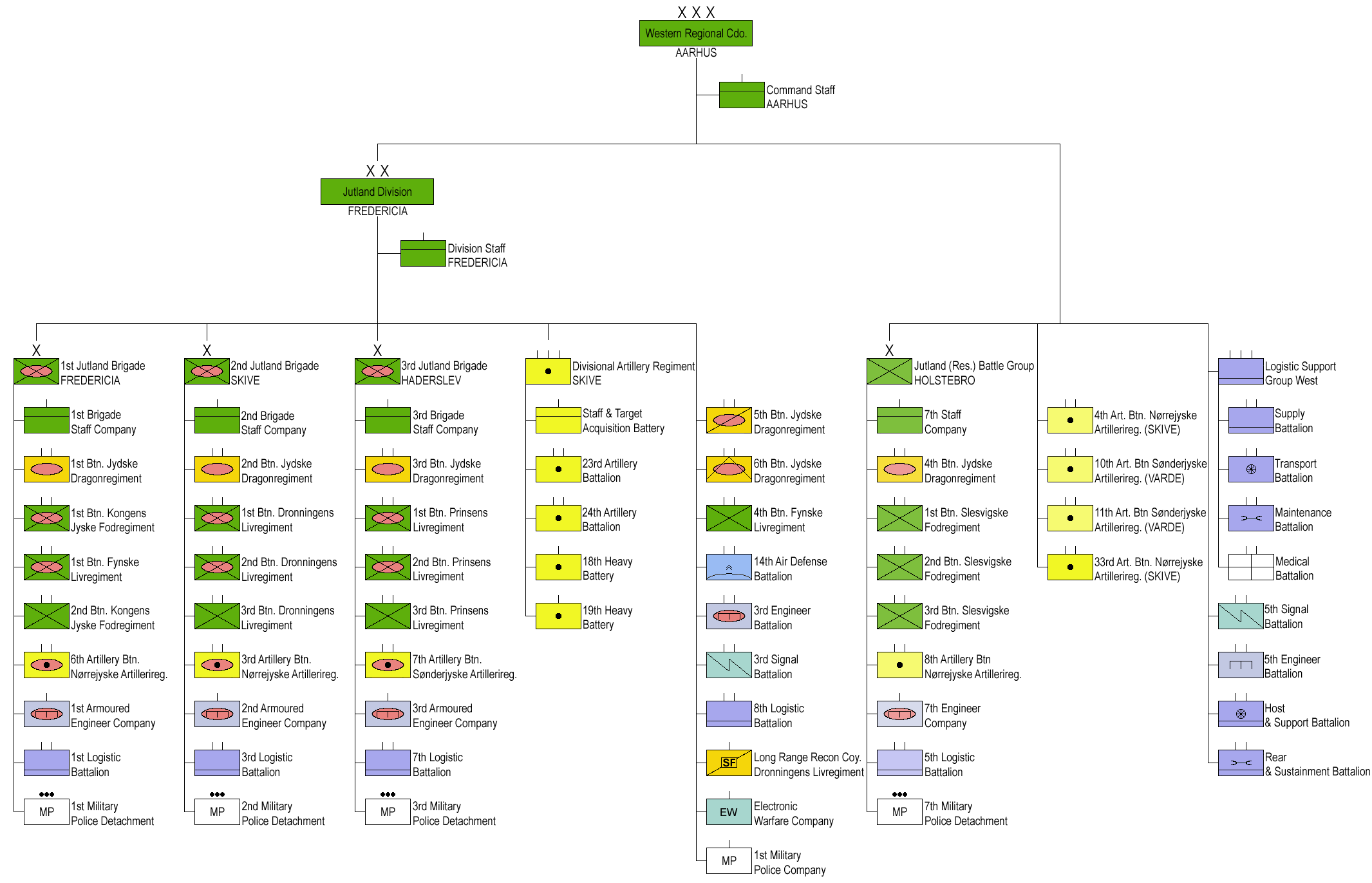
Structure of the Western Regional Command in 1989 (click to enlarge)

Western Regional Command units in 1989
Brigades Battle Groups (Reserve) Corps Artillery

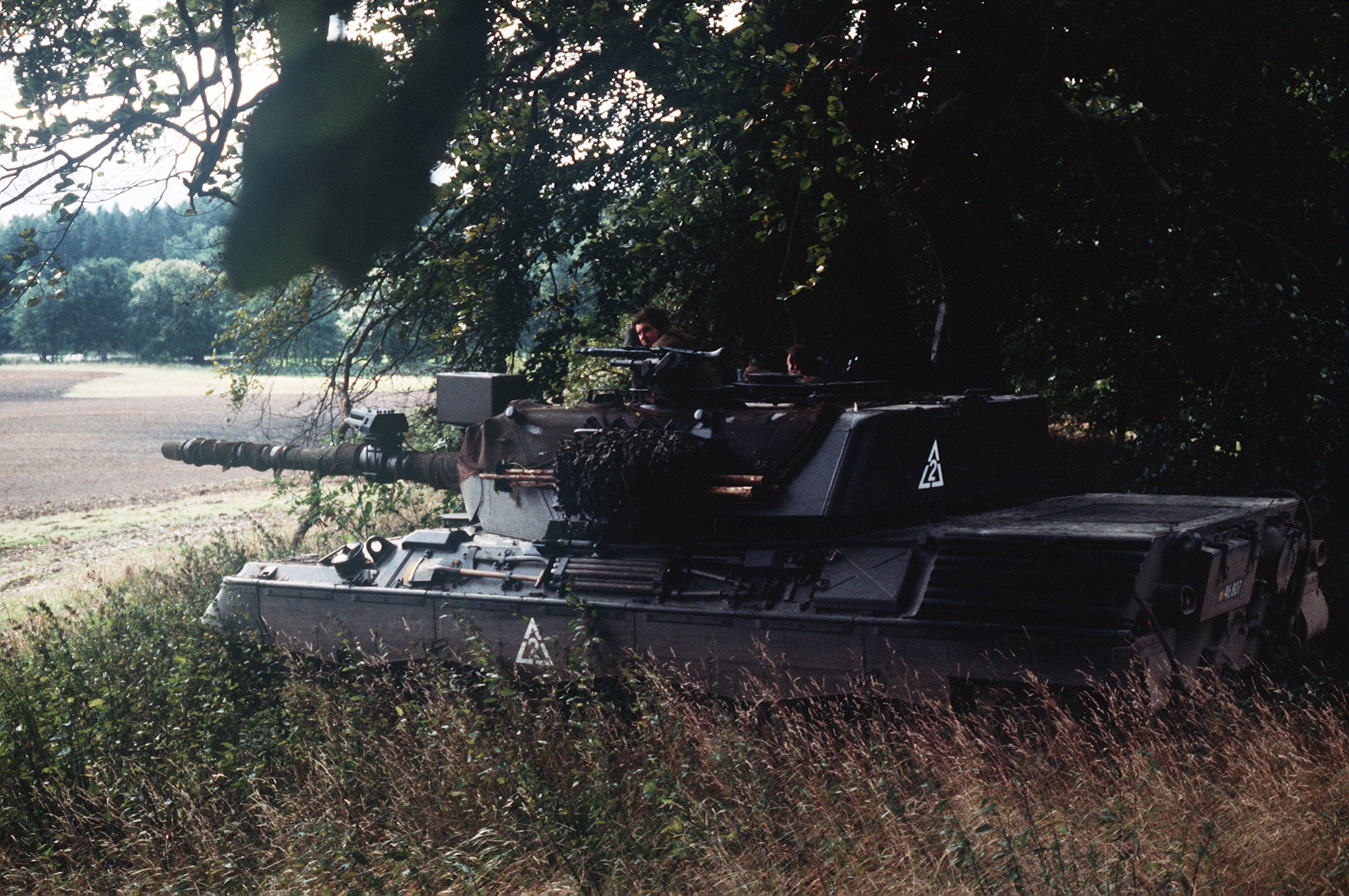
A Danish Leopard 1A3 during an exercise in 1984

The Western Regional Command was based in Aarhus and commanded by a major general. In case of war it would have transferred command of all its units to NATO's Commander, Allied Land Forces Schleswig-Holstein and Jutland (LANDJUT). The command was responsible for the South Jutland, Ribe, Vejle, Ringkjøbing, Viborg, North Jutland and Aarhus counties, which together form the Danish part of the Jutland peninsula, and also for the island of Funen, which with the surrounding islands formed the Funen County.

- Western Regional Command, Aarhus
  - Jutland Division, Fredericia
    - 3rd Signal Battalion
    - 1st Jutland Brigade, Fredericia
      - 1st Brigade Staff Company (5 × M113, 8 × TOW on Land Rover)
      - 1st Battalion, Jydske Dragonregiment, (20 × Leopard 1A3, 21 × M113 (including 4 with TOW), 4 × M125 mortar carriers, 2 × TOW on Land Rover)
      - 1st Battalion, Kongens Jyske Fodregiment, (10 × Leopard 1A3, 32 × M113 (including 4 with TOW), 4 × M125, 4 × TOW on Land Rover)
      - 1st Battalion, Fynske Livregiment, (10 × Leopard 1A3, 32 × M113 (including 4 with TOW), 4 × M125, 4 × TOW on Land Rover)
      - 2nd Battalion, Kongens Jyske Fodregiment, (Light Infantry)
      - 6th Artillery Battalion, Nørrejyske Artilleriregiment, (12 × M109A3 howitzer, 8 × M114/39 155 mm howitzer, 15 × M113)
      - 1st Armoured Engineer Company (6 × M113)
      - 1st Logistic Battalion
      - 1st Military Police Detachment
    - 2nd Jutland Brigade, Skive
      - 2nd Brigade Staff Company (5 × M113, 8 × TOW on Land Rover)
      - 2nd Battalion, Jydske Dragonregiment, (20 × Leopard 1A3, 21 × M113 (including 4 with TOW), 2 × M125)
      - 1st Battalion, Dronningens Livregiment, (10 × Leopard 1A3, 32 × M113 (including 4 with TOW), 4 × M125, 4 × TOW on Land Rover)
      - 2nd Battalion, Dronningens Livregiment, (10 × Leopard 1A3, 32 × M113 (including 4 with TOW), 4 × M125, 4 × TOW on Land Rover)
      - 3rd Battalion, Dronningens Livregiment, (Light Infantry)
      - 3rd Artillery Battalion, Nørrejyske Artilleriregiment, (12 × M109A3 howitzer, 8 × M114/39 155 mm howitzer)
      - 2nd Armoured Engineer Company
      - 3rd Logistic Battalion
      - 2nd Military Police Detachment
    - 3rd Jutland Brigade, Haderslev
      - 3rd Brigade Staff Company (5 × M113, 8 × TOW on Land Rover)
      - 3rd Battalion, Jydske Dragonregiment, (20 × Leopard 1A3, 21 × M113 (including 4 with TOW), 2 × M125)
      - 1st Battalion, Prinsens Livregiment, (10 × Leopard 1A3, 32 × M113 (including 4 with TOW), 4 × M125, 4 × TOW on Land Rover)
      - 2nd Battalion, Prinsens Livregiment, (10 × Leopard 1A3, 32 × M113 (including 4 with TOW), 4 × M125, 4 × TOW on Land Rover)
      - 3rd Battalion, Prinsens Livregiment, (Light Infantry)
      - 7th Artillery Battalion, Sønderjyske Artilleriregiment, (12 × M109A3 howitzer, 8 × M114/39 howitzer)
      - 3rd Armoured Engineer Company
      - 7th Logistic Battalion
      - 3rd Military Police Detachment
    - Divisional Artillery Regiment, Skive
      - Staff and Target Acquisition Battery
      - 23rd Artillery Battalion, (18 × M114/39 155 mm howitzer)
      - 24th Artillery Battalion, (18 × M114/39 155 mm howitzer)
      - 18th Heavy Battery, (4 × M115 203 mm howitzer)
      - 19th Heavy Battery, (4 × M115 203 mm howitzer)
    - 4th Battalion, Fynske Livregiment, (Light Infantry)
    - 5th Battalion, Jydske Dragonregiment, (Reconnaissance: 18 × M41 DK-1, 9 × M113, 9 × M125)
    - 6th Battalion, Jydske Dragonregiment, (Tank destroyer Battalion: 50 × Centurion Mk V (84 mm gun))
    - 33rd Artillery Battalion, Skive, Nørrejyske Artilleriregiment (18 × M59 155 mm gun, would have joined LANDJUT's Corps Artillery)
    - 14th Air Defence Battalion, (Stinger, Bofors 40 mm L/70)
    - 3rd Engineer Battalion
    - 8th Logistic Battalion
    - Long Range Reconnaissance Company, Dronningens Livregiment
    - Electronic Warfare Company
    - Heavy Transport Company
    - 1st Military Police Company

Western Regional Command reserve units:

- Jutland Battle Group, Holstebro
  - 7th Staff Company
  - 4th Btn, Jydske Dragonregiment, (Armored)
  - 1st Btn, Slesvigske Fodregiment, (Light Infantry)
  - 2nd Btn, Slesvigske Fodregiment, (Light Infantry)
  - 3rd Btn, Slesvigske Fodregiment, (Light Infantry)
  - 8th Artillery Btn, Nørrejyske Artilleriregiment, (6 × M114/39 155 mm howitzer, 12 × M101 105 mm howitzer)
  - 7th Engineer Company
  - 5th Logistic Battalion
  - 7th Military Police Detachment
- 4th Artillery Battalion, Skive, Nørrejyske Artilleriregiment (24 × M101 105 mm howitzer, would have joined LANDJUT's Corps Artillery)
- 10th Artillery Battalion, Varde, Sønderjyske Artilleriregiment (24 × M101 105 mm howitzer, would have joined LANDJUT's Corps Artillery)
- 11th Artillery Battalion, Varde, Sønderjyske Artilleriregiment (24 × M101 105 mm howitzer, would have joined LANDJUT's Corps Artillery)
- 5th Signal Battalion
- 5th Engineer Battalion
- Host and Support Battalion (Supporting arrival of NATO reinforcements in Jutland and northern Germany)
- Rear and Sustainment Battalion
- Logistics Support Group West (LSG-W)
  - Supply Battalion
  - Transport Battalion
  - Medical Battalion (incl. Medical Train)
  - Maintenance Battalion
  - Field Replacement Commando

==== Eastern Regional Command ====
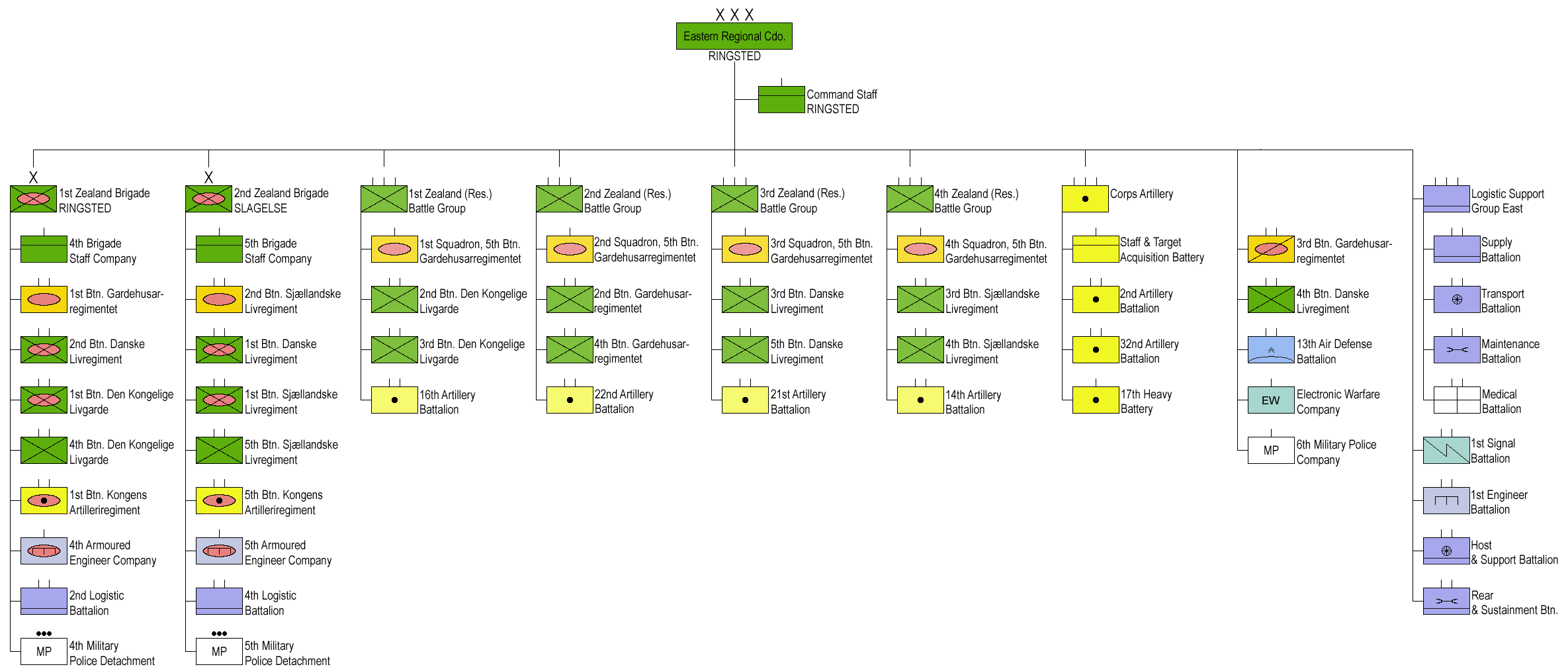
Structure of the Eastern Regional Command in 1989 (click to enlarge)

Eastern Regional Command units in 1989
Brigades Battle Groups (Reserve) Corps Artillery

The Eastern Regional Command was based in Ringsted and commanded by a major general, who in case of war would have become Commander, Allied Land Forces Zealand (LANDZEALAND). The command was responsible for the Copenhagen and Frederiksberg municipalities, and the Copenhagen, Frederiksborg, Roskilde, West Zealand and Storstrøm counties.

- Eastern Regional Command, Ringsted
  - 1st Signal Battalion
  - 1st Zealand Brigade
    - 4th Brigade Staff Company (5 × M113, 8 × TOW on Land Rover)
    - 1st Btn, Gardehusarregimentet, (30 × Centurion (105 mm L7 gun), 21 x M113 (including 4 with TOW), 2 × M106)
    - 2nd Btn, Danske Livregiment, (10 × Centurion (105 mm L7 gun), 46 × M113 (including 4 with TOW), 6 × M106, 4 TOW on Land Rover)
    - 1st Btn, Den Kongelige Livgarde, (10 × Centurion (105 mm L7 gun), 46 × M113 (including 4 with TOW), 6 × M106, 4 TOW on Land Rover)
    - 4th Btn, Den Kongelige Livgarde, (Light Infantry)
    - 1st Btn, Kongens Artilleriregiment, (12 × M109A3, 8 × M114/39)
    - 4th Armoured Engineer Company
    - 2nd Logistic Battalion
    - 4th Military Police Detachment
  - 2nd Zealand Brigade
    - 5th Brigade Staff Company (5 × M113, 8 × TOW on Land Rover)
    - 2nd Btn, Sjællandske Livregiment, (30 × Centurion (105 mm L7 gun), 21 x M113 (including 4 with TOW), 2 × M106),
    - 1st Btn, Danske Livregiment, (10 × Centurion (105 mm L7 gun), 46 × M113 (including 4 with TOW), 6 × M106, 4 TOW on Land Rover)
    - 1st Btn, Sjællandske Livregiment, (10 × Centurion (105 mm L7 gun), 46 × M113 (including 4 with TOW), 6 × M106, 4 TOW on Land Rover)
    - 5th Btn, Sjællandske Livregiment, (Light Infantry)
    - 5th Btn, Kongens Artilleriregiment, (12 × M109A3, 8 × M114/39)
    - 5th Armoured Engineer Company
    - 4th Logistic Battalion
    - 5th Military Police Detachment
  - Corps Artillery
    - Staff and Target Acquisition Battery
    - 2nd Artillery Battalion, (18 × M114/39 155 mm howitzer)
    - 32nd Artillery Battalion, (18 × M59 155 mm gun)
    - 17th Heavy Battery, (4 × M115 203 mm howitzer)
  - 3rd Btn, Gardehusarregimentet, (Reconnaissance: 18 × M41 DK-1, 12 × M113, 9 × M106)
  - 4th Btn, Danske Livregiment, (Light Infantry)
  - 13th Air Defence Battalion, (Stinger)
  - 1st Engineer Battalion
  - 6th Logistic Battalion
  - Electronic Warfare Company
  - 6th Military Police Company

Eastern Regional Command reserve units:

- 1st Zealand Battle Group
  - 1st Antitank Squadron Gardehusarregimentet, (8 × Centurion (84 mm gun))
  - 2nd Btn, Den Kongelige Livgarde, (Light Infantry)
  - 3rd Btn, Den Kongelige Livgarde, (Light Infantry)
  - 16th Artillery Battalion, (24 × M101)
- 2nd Zealand Battle Group
  - 2nd Antitank Squadron, Gardehusarregimentet, (8 × Centurion(84 mm gun))
  - 2nd Btn, Gardehusarregimentet, (Light Infantry)
  - 4th Btn, Gardehusarregimentet, (Light Infantry)
  - 22nd Artillery Battalion, (24 × M101)
- 3rd Zealand Battle Group
  - 3rd Antitank Squadron Gardehusarregimentet, (8 × Centurion(84 mm gun))
  - 3rd Btn, Danske Livregiment, (Light Infantry)
  - 5th Btn, Danske Livregiment, (Light Infantry)
  - 21st Artillery Battalion, (24 × M101)
- 4th Zealand Battle Group
  - 4th Antitank Squadron, Gardehusarregimentet, (8 × Centurion(84 mm gun))
  - 3rd Btn, Sjællandske Livregiment, (Light Infantry)
  - 4th Btn, Sjællandske Livregiment, (Light Infantry)
  - 14th Artillery Battalion, (24 × M101)
- Host and Support Battalion (Supporting arrival of NATO reinforcements on Zealand)
- Rear and Sustainment Battalion
- Logistics Support Group East (LSG-E)
  - Supply Battalion
  - Transport Company
  - Medical Battalion
  - Maintenance Battalion
  - Field Replacement Commando

==== Bornholms Værn ====
In wartime the island of Bornholm was, due to the long distance from Zealand, an independent command. Furthermore, agreements signed after World War II forbade the stationing on Bornholm or reinforcing of Bornholm, by foreign troops. Therefore, the island was only guarded by one Battle Group with a single active light infantry battalion. However, during the transition to war this Battle Group would have been augmented and reinforced by local reservists.

- Bornholms Værn's Battle Group
  - Staff and Signal Company
  - 1st Battalion, Bornholms Værn (infantry) (4 × TOW on Land Rover)
  - 2nd Battalion, Bornholms Værn (infantry) (reserve) (4 × TOW on Land Rover)
  - 3rd Battalion, Bornholms Værn (infantry) (reserve) (12 x 106 mm RR on Jeep M38)
  - Light Tank Squadron, "Bornholm Dragoons" (10 × M41 DK-1)
  - Light Reconnaissance Squadron (6 × M41 DK-1)
  - 12th Artillery Battalion (18 × M101)
  - Air Defence Battery (Stinger)
  - Motorized Engineer Company
  - Maintenance & Logistic Company

==== Royal Danish Army Aircraft Inventory 1989 ====
The inventory of the Royal Danish Army in 1989 consisted of the following aircraft:

- 14 × Hughes 500M, observation
- 12 × AS350 L1 Écureuil, armed with TOW anti-tank missiles
- 8 × T-17 Supporter, liaison and observation

=== Royal Danish Air Force ===
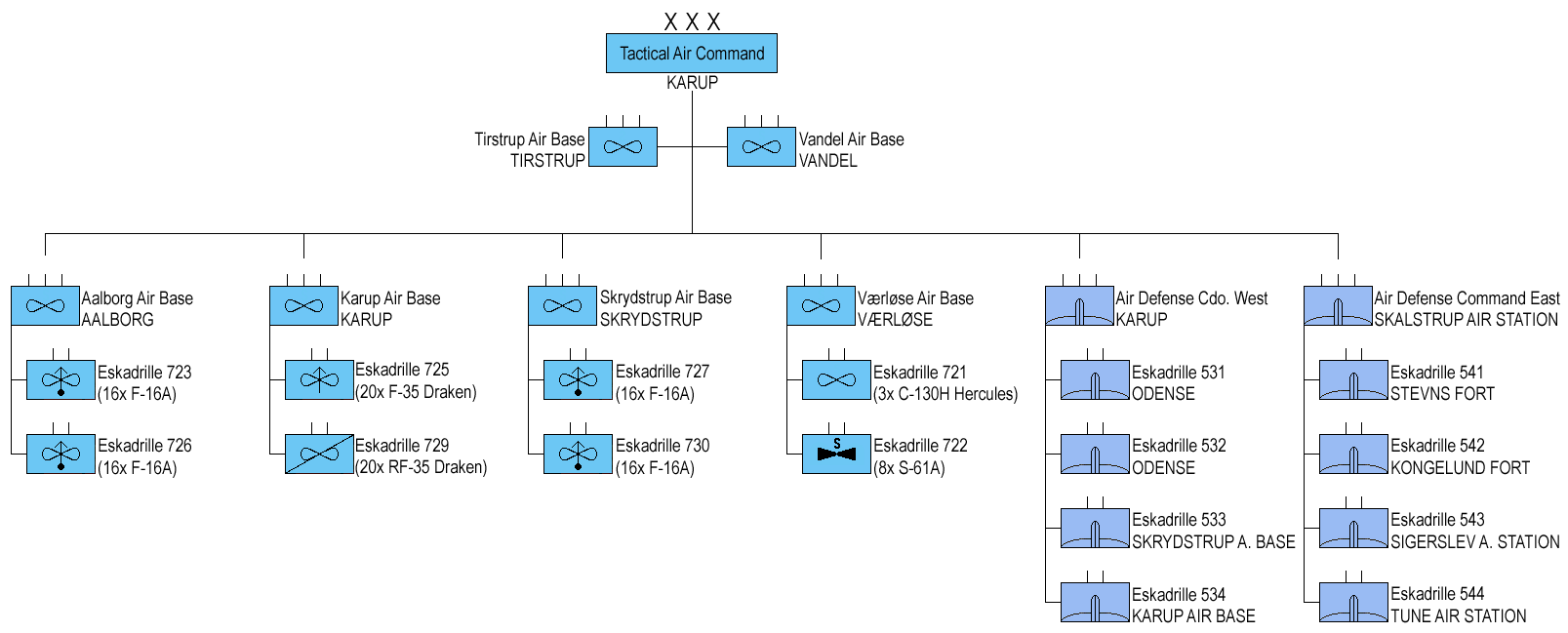
Structure of the Tactical Air Command in 1989 (click to enlarge)

Royal Danish Air Force bases in 1989

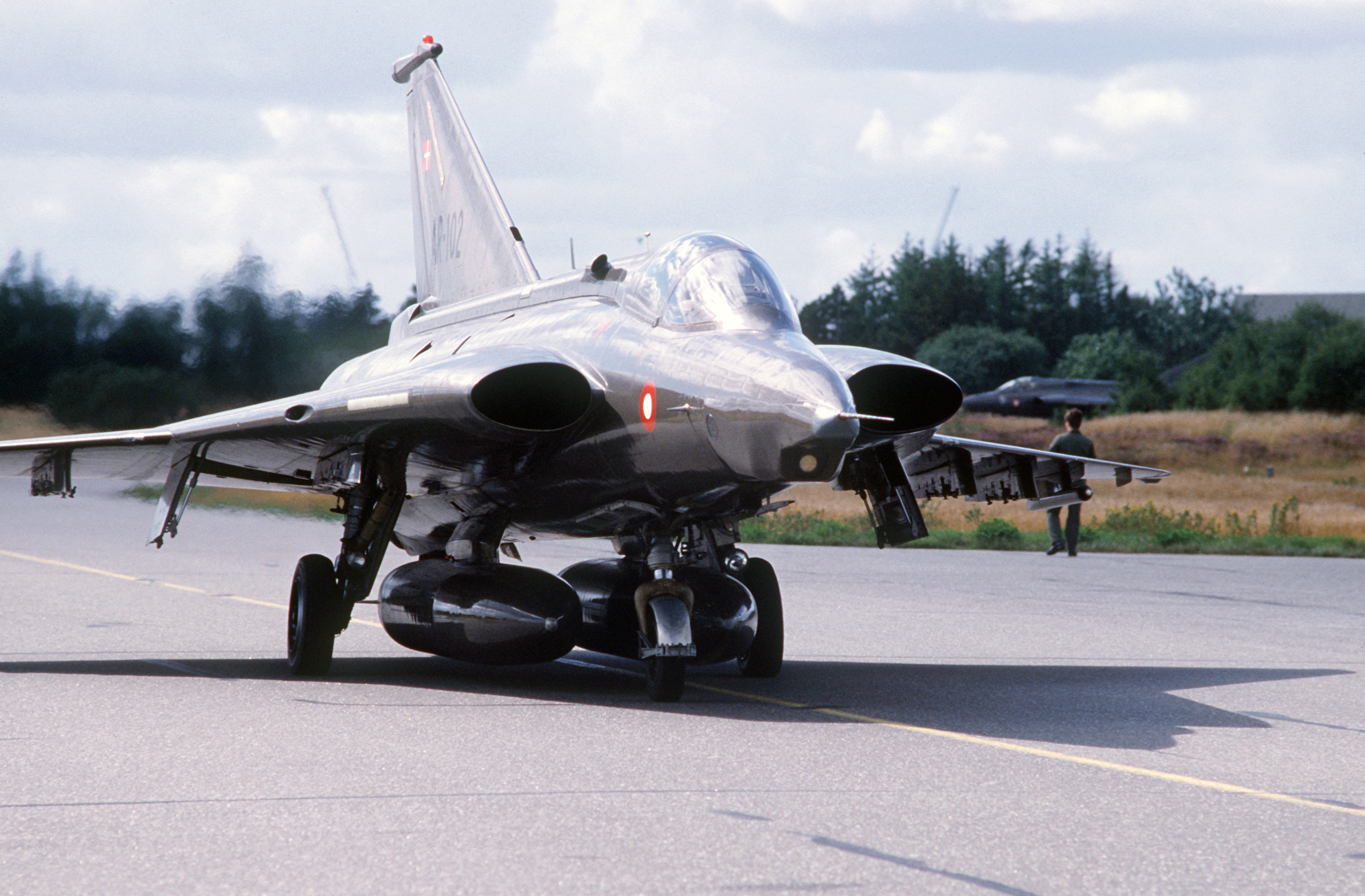
An RF-35 Draken taxiing into takeoff position during Exercise OKSBOEL '86 at Karup Air Base.

The Royal Danish Air Force Command was headquartered at Karup Air Base and tasked to train, maintain and prepare the army for war. However operational control in peacetime rested with the Tactical Air Command. In wartime the air force's commander would have become the commander of Allied Air Forces Baltic Approaches (AIRBALTAP). AIRBALTAP commanded all flying units, flying reinforcements, all ground-based radar systems and stations, all air defence units and airfields in its sector. In war the entire Royal Danish Air Force would have come under AIRBALTAP.

In 1989 the Royal Danish Air Force consisted of the following units:

- Royal Danish Air Force, in Karup, commanded by a Danish lieutenant general
  - Flyveskolen (Basic Flying School), Avnø Air Base, T-17 Supporter
  - Air Force Materiel Command, Karup
    - Air Force Depot Service
    - Air Force Maintenance Service
    - Air Force Ammunition Arsenal
  - Tactical Air Command, Karup
    - Aalborg Air Base
      - Eskadrille 723, F-16A
      - Eskadrille 726, F-16A
    - Karup Air Base
      - Eskadrille 725, F-35 Draken, TF-35 Draken
      - Eskadrille 729, Reconnaissance, RF-35 Draken, TF-35 Draken
    - Tirstrup Air Base
      - Co-located Operating Base to be reinforced by U.S. Air Force / Royal Air Force squadrons
    - Vandel Air Base
      - Co-located Operating Base to be reinforced by U.S. Air Force / Royal Air Force squadrons
    - Skrydstrup Air Base
      - Eskadrille 727, F-16A
      - Eskadrille 730, F-16A
    - Værløse Air Base
      - Eskadrille 721, Transport, C-130H Hercules, Gulfstream III
      - Eskadrille 722, Search and rescue, S-61A helicopters
  - Air Defence Command East, Skalstrup Air Station
    - Eskadrille 541, Stevns Fort, with 1 × I-Hawk battery (6 × launchers)
    - Eskadrille 542, Kongelund Fort near Aflangshagen Air Station, with 1 × I-Hawk battery (6 × launchers)
    - Eskadrille 543, Sigerslev Air Station, with 1 × I-Hawk battery (6 × launchers)
    - Eskadrille 544, Tune near Skalstrup Air Station, with 1 × I-Hawk battery (6 × launchers)
  - Air Defence Command West, Karup
    - Eskadrille 531, Odense, with 1 × I-Hawk battery (6 × launchers)
    - Eskadrille 532, Odense, with 1 × I-Hawk battery (6 × launchers)
    - Eskadrille 533, Skrydstrup Air Base, with 1 × I-Hawk battery (6 × launchers)
    - Eskadrille 534, Karup Air Base, with 1 × I-Hawk battery (6 × launchers)

==== Royal Danish Air Force Inventory 1989 ====
The inventory of the RDAF in 1989 consisted of the following aircraft:

- 70 × F-16A/B Falcon, fighter (last 12 × delivered in 1989)
- 16 × F-35 Draken, fighter
- 18 × RF-35 Draken, reconnaissance
- 9 × TF-35 Draken, training
- 3 × C-130H Hercules, transport
- 3 × Gulfstream III, VIP
- 8 × S-61A Search and Rescue helicopters
- 20 × T-17 Supporter, training and liaison

=== Royal Danish Navy ===
Danish naval bases and coastal fortresses in 1989

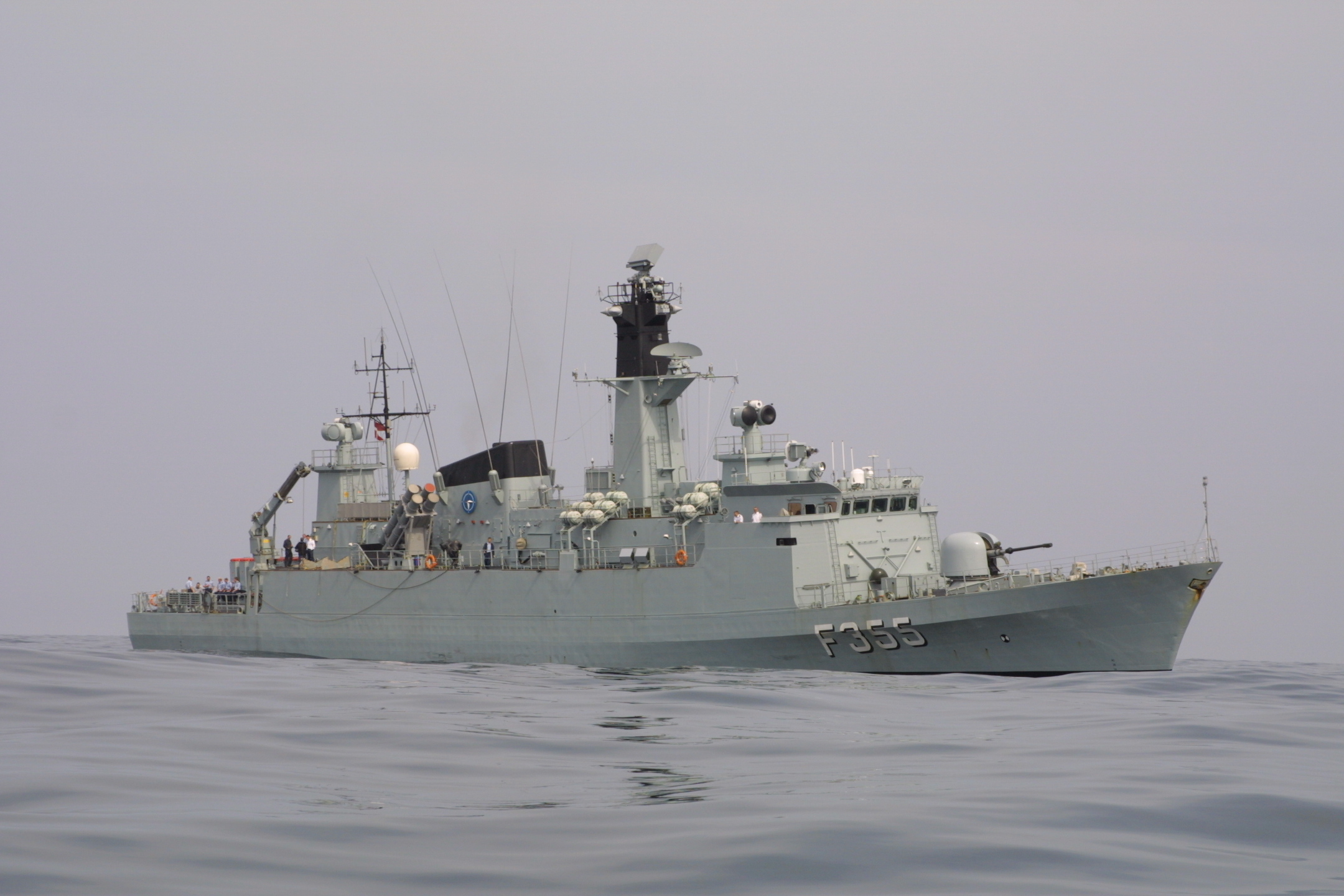
Corvette F355 Olfert Fischer underway

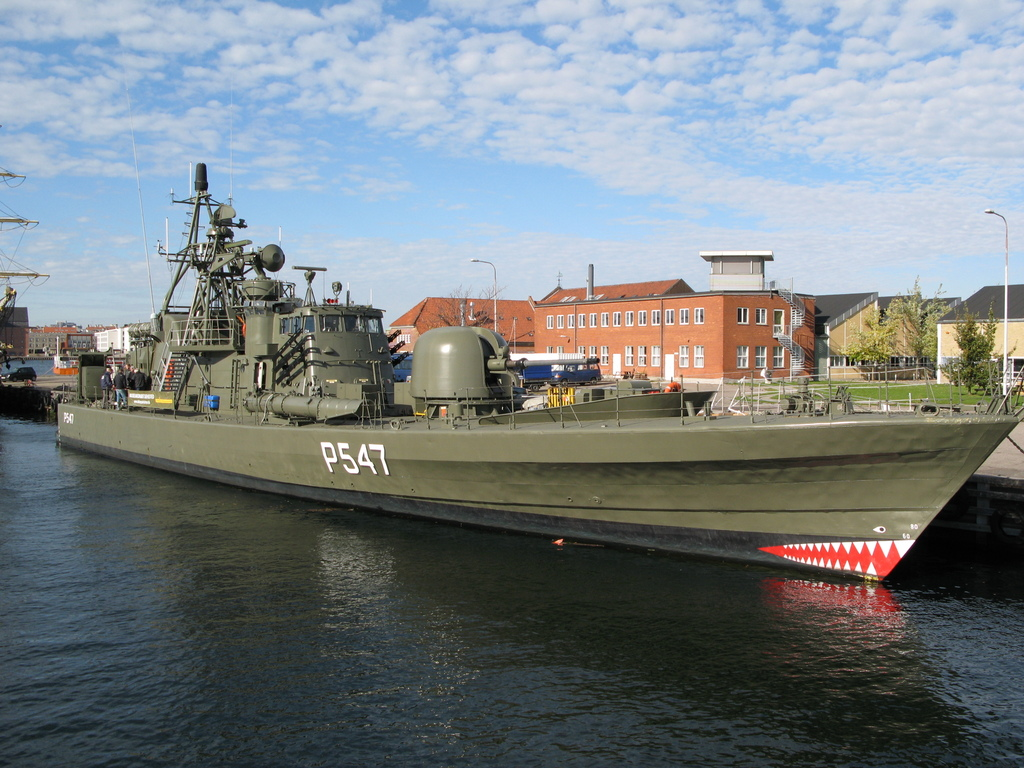
Missile boat P547 Sehested in port

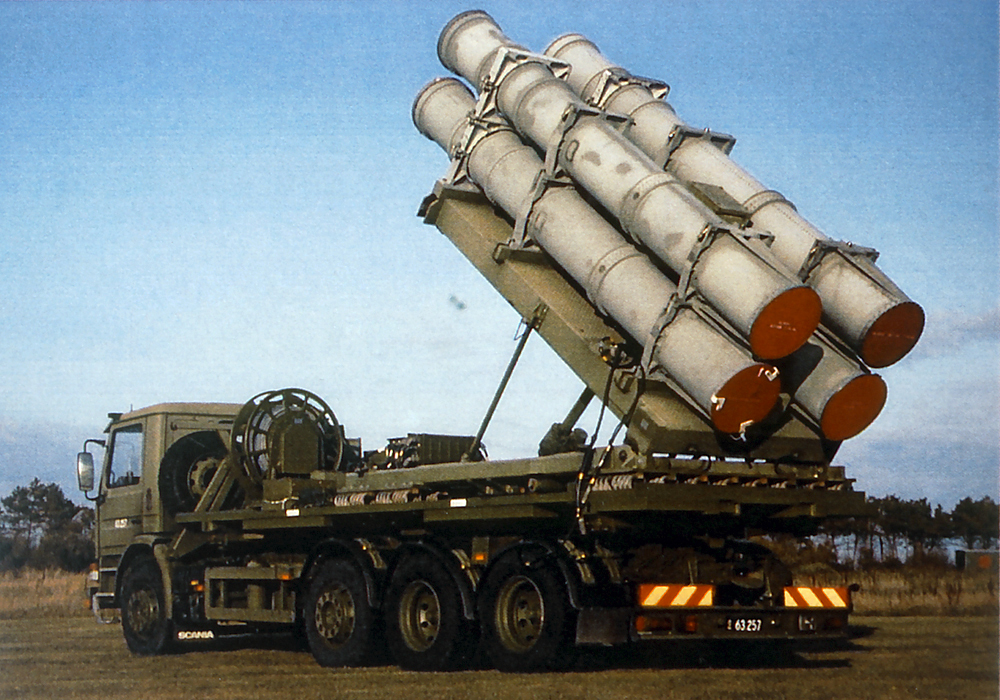
Danish mobile Harpoon anti-ship missile launcher

The Royal Danish Navy Command was based in Aarhus and tasked to train, maintain and prepare the navy for war. However operational command in peacetime rested with the Navy Operational Command. In war, the commander of the Royal Danish Navy would have come as "Flag Officer Denmark (FOD)" under the command of Allied Naval Forces Baltic Approaches (NAVBALTAP), which was commanded alternatingly by a Danish or German vice admiral. However Danish ships and units based in Greenland and the Faroe Islands would have come under command of NATO's Command Eastern Atlantic Area (EASTLANT), who would also have taken command of Island Command Greenland and Island Command Faroes.

Together with German Fleet under the Flag Officer Germany (FOG) the Royal Danish Navy would have tried to keep the Warsaw Pact's United Baltic Sea Fleets, consisting of the Soviet Baltic Fleet, Polish Navy and East German Volksmarine bottled up in the Baltic Sea by blocking the Danish Straits and thus ensuring NATOs unchallenged control of the North Sea. Additionally, NAVBALTAP was to prevent amphibious landings on the Danish coast. To fulfill its mission the navy fielded a large number of minelayers and fast attack crafts. The first would have been used to mine all sea lanes and potential landings beaches, while the latter would have harassed the enemy fleet with continuous hit and run attacks.

At the beginning of 1989 the Royal Danish Navy consisted of the following ships.

- Royal Danish Navy, in Aarhus, commanded by a vice admiral
  - Navy Materiel Command, Aarhus
    - Navy Depot Service
    - Navy Maintenance Service
    - Navy Ammunition Arsenal
  - Frogman Corps, at Torpedo Station Kongsøre
  - Sirius Dog Sled Patrol, Daneborg, Greenland
  - Navy Operational Command, Aarhus
    - Kattegat Marine District, Frederikshavn (Maritime Surveillance Center and tactical control of sea units)
    - Bornholm Marine District, Rytterknægten (Maritime Surveillance Center and tactical control of sea units)
      - Frigate Squadron
        - Peder Skram-class frigates: F352 Peder Skram, F353 Herluf Trolle
        - Niels Juel-class corvettes: F354 Niels Juel, F355 Olfert Fischer, F356 Peter Tordenskiold
        - Daphne-class seaward defence vessels (in the process of being replaced by Flyvefisken-class patrol vessels): P530 Daphne, P531 Dryaden, P533 Havfruen, P534 Najaden, P535 Nymfen, P536 Neptun (decommissioned 30 October 30, 1989), P537 Ran, P538 Rota (decommissioned 31 October 1989)
        - Oiler: A559 Sleipner
      - Torpedo Boat Squadron
        - Søløven-class fast torpedo boats (in the process of being replaced by Flyvefisken-class patrol vessels): P510 Søløven, P511 Søridderen, P512 Søbjørnen, P513 Søhesten, P514 Søhunden, P515 Søulven
        - Willemoes-class fast missile boats: P540 Bille, P541 Bredal, P542 Hammer, P543 Huitfeldt, P544 Krieger, P545 Norby, P546 Rodsteen, P547 Sehested, P548 Suenson, P549 Willemoes
        - Flyvefisken-class patrol vessel: P550 Flyvefisken (commissioned 19 December 1989)
        - Oilers: A568 Rimfaxe, A569 Skinfaxe
        - Land-based Mobile Base (MOBA) with approximately 40 trucks, which supplied fuel, ordnance, and freshwater, and provided repair facilities outside the naval bases to the torpedo boats. MOBA also had mobile radars for tactical surveillance and target acquisition, and
      - Submarine Squadron
        - Narwhal-class submarines: S320 Narhvalen, S321 Nordkaperen
        - Kobben-class submarine: S322 Tumleren (bought from Norway and commissioned on 20 October 1989)
        - Dolphin-class submarines: S327 Spækhuggeren (decommissioned 31 July 1989), S329 Springeren
      - Mine Vessels Squadron
        - Lindormen-class cable minelayers: N43 Lindormen, N44 Lossen
        - Falster-class minelayers: N80 Falster, N81 Fyen, N82 Møen, N83 Sjælland
        - Sund-class minesweepers (in the process of being replaced by Flyvefisken-class patrol vessels): M572 Alssund (decommissioned 30 November 1989), M573 Egernsund (decommissioned 31 December 1989), M574 Grønsund, M575 Guldborgsund, M577 Ulvsund (had been refitted as a minehunter, decommissioned 31 December 1989), M578 Vilsund
      - Fishery Protection Squadron
        - Hvidbjørnen-class offshore patrol frigates: F348 Hvidbjørnen, F349 Vædderen, F350 Ingolf, F351 Fylla
        - Beskytteren-class offshore patrol frigate: F340 Beskytteren
        - Agdlek-class arctic patrol cutters: Y386 Agdlek, Y387 Agpa, Y388 Tulugaq
        - Barsø-class naval patrol cutters: Y300 Barsø, Y301 Drejø, Y302 Romsø, Y303 Samsø, Y304 Thurø, Y305 Vejrø, Y306 Farø, Y307 Læsø, Y308 Rømø
      - Danish Naval Air Squadron, Værløse Air Base (8 × Lynx Mk.80 helicopters)
      - Coastal artillery, with truck-mounted AGM-84 Harpoon anti-ship missiles

==== Navy Bases ====
Main bases:

- Holmen Naval Base
- Frederikshavn Naval Base
- Korsor Naval Base

Minor naval bases:

- Marine Station Aarhus (Danish Navy fleet command base)
- Marine Station Esbjerg (NATO reinforcements port)
- Marine Station Grønnedal in Greenland
- Marine Station Thorshavn in the Faroe Islands
- Torpedo Station Kongsøre (Frogman Corps and mine divers base)
- Lyngsbæk Pier (Naval mines depot)

Coastal fortifications:

- Stevnsfortet at the southern entrance to Øresund
- Langelandsfortet at the southern entrance to the Great Belt

Sea surveillance stations:

- Marine Station Møn
- Marine Station Gedser
- Marine Station Bornholm

==== Royal Danish Navy Aircraft Inventory 1989 ====
The inventory of the Royal Danish Navy in 1989 consisted of the following aircraft:

- 1 × Lynx 23
- 6 × Lynx 80
- 2 × Lynx 90

=== Home Guard ===
The Danish Home Guard was a volunteer military organization in a permanent state of readiness. The task of the Home Guard was to support the armed forces. The Home Guard Command was based in Copenhagen and administered the home guard during peacetime. In case of war the home guard units would have reinforced the other three armed services.

==== Army Home Guard ====
The Army Home Guard was commanded by a major general. Home guard units were tasked to secure and guard key infrastructure, and report and delay enemy infiltrations by air or sea in their area of operation. The Army Home Guard divided Denmark into seven territorial regions, which were each commanded by a Colonel.

- Army Home Guard
  - Special Support and Reconnaissance, Haderslev Company (Long Range Reconnaissance Company for LANDZEALAND)
  - 1st Territorial Region (Northern Jutland), Aalborg, responsible for North Jutland County
    - 4th Btn, Dronningens Livregiment, (Light Infantry)
    - Tank Destroyer Squadron, Dronningens Livregiment, (8 × Centurion Mk V (84 mm gun))
    - 15th Light Battery, (8 × M101 105 mm howitzer)
    - Engineer Company
    - 6 × Homeguard Districts
      - 6 × Homeguard Staff Companies
      - 31 × Area Companies
      - 6 × Homeguard Military Police Companies
  - 2nd Territorial Region (Middle Jutland), Viborg, responsible for Viborg, Ringkjøbing and Aarhus counties
    - 4th Btn, Prinsens Livregiment, (Light Infantry)
    - Tank Destroyer Squadron, Prinsens Livregiment, (8 × Centurion Mk V (84 mm gun))
    - 9th Light Battery, (8 × M101 105 mm howitzer)
    - Engineer Company
    - 10 × Homeguard Districts
      - 10 × Homeguard Staff Companies
      - 56 × Area Companies
      - 10 × Homeguard Military Police Companies
  - 3rd Territorial Region (Southern Jutland), Haderslev, responsible for the South Jutland, Ribe and Vejle counties
    - 4th Btn, Slesvigske Fodregiment, (Light Infantry)
    - 3rd Btn, Kongens Jyske Fodregiment, (Light Infantry)
    - Tank Destroyer Squadron, Slesvigske Fodregiment, (8 × Centurion Mk V (84 mm gun))
    - Tank Destroyer Squadron, Kongens Jyske Fodregiment, (8 × Centurion Mk V (84 mm gun))
    - 15th Artillery Battalion, (16 × M101 105 mm howitzer)
    - Engineer Company
    - 11 × Homeguard Districts
      - 11 × Homeguard Staff companies
      - 53 × Area Companies
      - 11 × Homeguard Military Police Companies
  - 4th Territorial Region, Odense, responsible for Funen County
    - 2nd Btn, Fynske Livregiment, (Light Infantry)
    - 3rd Btn, Fynske Livregiment, (Light Infantry)
    - 1st Tank Destroyer Squadrons, Fynske Livregiment, (8 × Centurion Mk V (84 mm gun))
    - 2nd Tank Destroyer Squadrons, Fynske Livregiment, (8 × Centurion Mk V (84 mm gun))
    - Artillery Battalion, (16 × M101 105 mm howitzer)
    - Engineer Company
    - 5 × Homeguard Districts
      - 5 × Homeguard staff companies
      - 32 × Area Companies
      - 5 × Homeguard Military Police Companies
  - 5th Territorial Region (Zealand) in Ringsted, responsible for Roskilde, West Zealand and Storstrøm counties
    - Engineer Company
    - 9 × Homeguard Districts
      - 9 × Homeguard Staff Companies
      - 50 × Area Companies
      - 9 × Homeguard Military Police Companies
  - 6th Territorial Region (Northern Zealand/Copenhagen) in Copenhagen, responsible for Copenhagen and Frederiksberg municipalities, and Copenhagen and Frederiksborg counties. Den Kongelige Livgarde and the Mounted Hussar Squadron were active units.
    - Den Kongelige Livgarde (Infantry, in case of wartime upgrade to double battalion size and had 2 × Heavy Mortar platoons (4x120 mm MT))
    - Mounted Hussar Squadron, Gardehusarregimentet, (Infantry, in case of wartime upgrade to battalion size)
    - Engineer Company
    - 4 × Homeguard Districts (Northern Zealand)
      - 4 × Homeguard Staff Companies
      - 29 × Area Companies
      - 4 × Homeguard Military Police Companies
    - ? x Homeguard Districts (Copenhagen)
      - ? x Homeguard Staff Company
      - ? x Area Company
      - ? x Homeguard Military Police Company
  - 7th Territorial Region (Bornholm), responsible for Bornholm
    - 1 × Homeguard District
      - Homeguard Staff Company
      - 5 × Homeguard Area Companies
      - Homeguard Military Police Company

==== Air Force Home Guard ====
The Air Force Home Guard would have provided additional ground and air defence personnel to the Air Force, and would have manned the co-located operating base at which U.S. Air Force reinforcement would have been based.

==== Naval Home Guard ====
The Naval Home Guard (Marinehjemmeværnet (MHV)) was fielded a small number of ships for coastal surveillance.

- MH-90-class home guard cutters: MHV 90 Bopa, MHV 91 Brigaden, MHV 92 Holger Danske, MHV 93 Hvidsten, MHV 94 Ringen, MHV 95 Speditøren

== Sources ==
- Peter Monte, Die Rolle der Marine der Bundesrepublik Deutschland in der Verteidigungsplanung für Mittel- und Nordeuropa von den 50er Jahren bis zur Wende 1989/90; in: Werner Rahn (Hrsg.), Deutsche Marinen im Wandel, S. 565 ff.. München 2005. ISBN 3-486-57674-7
- Norbert Rath; Headquarter Allied Forces Baltic Approaches (HQ BALTAP); in Marineforum 4–1997, S. 3ff.

== Literature ==
- Thomas-Durell Young, Command in NATO After the Cold War: Alliance, National and Multinational Considerations
