= List of ship commissionings in 1974 =

The list of ship commissionings in 1974 includes a chronological list of ships commissioned in 1974. In cases where no official commissioning ceremony was held, the date of service entry may be used instead.

| Date | Operator | Ship | Class and type | Notes |
|---|---|---|---|---|
| 26 January | United States Navy | Pharris | Knox-class frigate | |
| 16 February | United States Navy | California | California-class cruiser | |
| March 12 | Royal Danish Navy | HDMS Agdlek | Agdlek-class cutter | |
| March 15 | Royal Danish Navy | HDMS Agpa | Agdlek-class cutter | |
| June 28 | (Denmark) DFDS Seaways | Dana Regina | Ferry | |
| July 5 | (Finland) Rederi Ab Sally | Viking 5 | Ferry | For Viking Line traffic |
| July 27 | United States Navy | Valdez | Knox-class frigate | |
| August | People's Liberation Army Navy | Changzheng 1 | Type 091 submarine | Date of initial operational capability |
| September 30 | Soviet Navy | Razumnyy (201) | Project 1135 large anti-submarine ship | |
