= Listed buildings in Greve Municipality =

This is a list of listed buildings in Greve Municipality, Denmark.

== List ==
Listing name	Image	Location	Coordinates	Description
Old School and Degneboligen		Degnestræde 3 and 7, 2670 Greve		
Old School and Degneboligen		Degnestræde 3 and 7, 2670 Greve		
Greve Rectory		Michael Gjøes Vej 1, 2670 Greve	1790s	
Greve Rectory		Michael Gjøes Vej 1, 2670 Greve	1790s	
Greve Rectory		Michael Gjøes Vej 1, 2670 Greve	1790s	
Revsmosegård		Mosede Bygade 51, 2670 Greve		
Revsmosegård		Mosede Bygade 51, 2670 Greve		
Revsmosegård		Mosede Bygade 51, 2670 Greve		
