= Hedebo Greenway =

The Hedebo Greenway (Danish: Hedebostien) is an under-construction footpath and cycleway which will run from Roskilde Fjord at Roskilde to the Bay of Køge in the western and southern part of metropolitan Copenhagen, Denmark. The total length is 21.7 kilometres (13.5 mi).

"The Hedebo Greenway – from inlet to bay" is developed as a collaboration between Roskilde, Greve and Solrød municipalities with economic support from the Nordea Foundation. A number of fitness stations as well as interpretive boards with information on cultural and natural sites will be placed along the route.

== Route ==
- Vindinge Nature Playground, Vindinge
- Tune Hallerne, Tune
- Karlstrup Nyskov
- Karlstrup and Engstrup moser
- Køge Bugt Strandpark

== See also ==
- Copenhagen Super Bikeways
- Hedeland
