= Hedeland =

Park in Høje-Taastrup Municipality, Denmark

Coordinates: 55.6250°N 12.1722°E

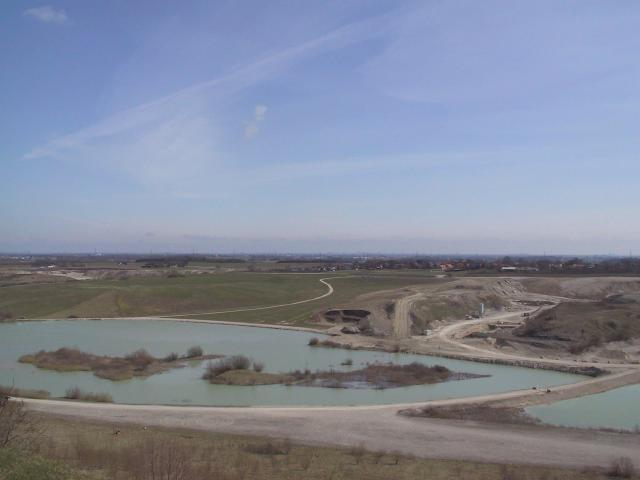
A former gravel pit

Hedeland^{da} is a 15-square-kilometre recreational area located between the towns of Hedehusene, Tune and Vindinge, some 20 km west of central Copenhagen, Denmark. The undulating landscape has emerged as a result of comprehensive extraction of gravel followed by environmental restoration since the late 1970s. The area is owned by a company, I/S Hedeland, which is owned by the municipalities of Høje-Taastrup, Greve and Roskilde.

The landscape consists of both woods and open land and has a varied flora and bird life. Many of the former gravel pits have been converted into lakes and ponds. Hedeland is also home to a wide selection of recreational facilities, including a golf course, a kart circuit, a vintage railway, equestrian centre, amphitheatre and fishing ponds.

The Danish Scout Council has hosted Jamboree Denmark there in 2022 and 2026.

== Name ==
The name has been created from the words hede, meaning heath. The flat and fertile moraine landscape between Roskilde, Køge and Copenhagen was from the Middle Ages known as Hedeboegnen or simply Heden ("The Heath").

== Facilities ==
=== Equestrian centre ===
Hedehusgården Equestrian Centre is located at Brandhøjgårdsvej 2 in the northeastern corner of Hedeland. Hedehusgården is an old farmhouse which in 1892 was purchased by an engineer who wanted to extract gravel from its land. The equestrian club traces its roots back to 1946 but took over Hedehusgården in 1976.

=== Vintage railway ===
Hedeland Vintage Railway (HVB), (IBK), (Hedeland veteran jernbane, Hedelands Veteranbane^{da}) is a 5.2 km narrow gauge railway operated by the Danish Industrial Railway Society. Built by members of the society, construction began in 1975 and the first short stretch was opened in 1977. It currently offers a 10 km return trip but plans exist to extend the railway all the way to Tune which will increase its length to 7 km. Service is both steam and diesel locomotives. Most of the tracks and rolling stock come from defunct industrial rail lines that were used for transporting sugar beets on the island of Lolland.

=== Brandhøj Miniature Railway ===
Brandhøj Miniature Railway (Brandhøj Banen^{da}) covers 18,000 m^{2} and has a total length of more than 1,200 metres. Construction began in 1984.

=== Motor sports ===
Roskilde Racing Center is located next to Roskilde Airport at Tune. Hedeland Motor Club (Hedelands Motorklub), a club with more than 500 members, opened a kart circuit there in 2001. It has a length of 1250 metres. There is also a cross circuit.

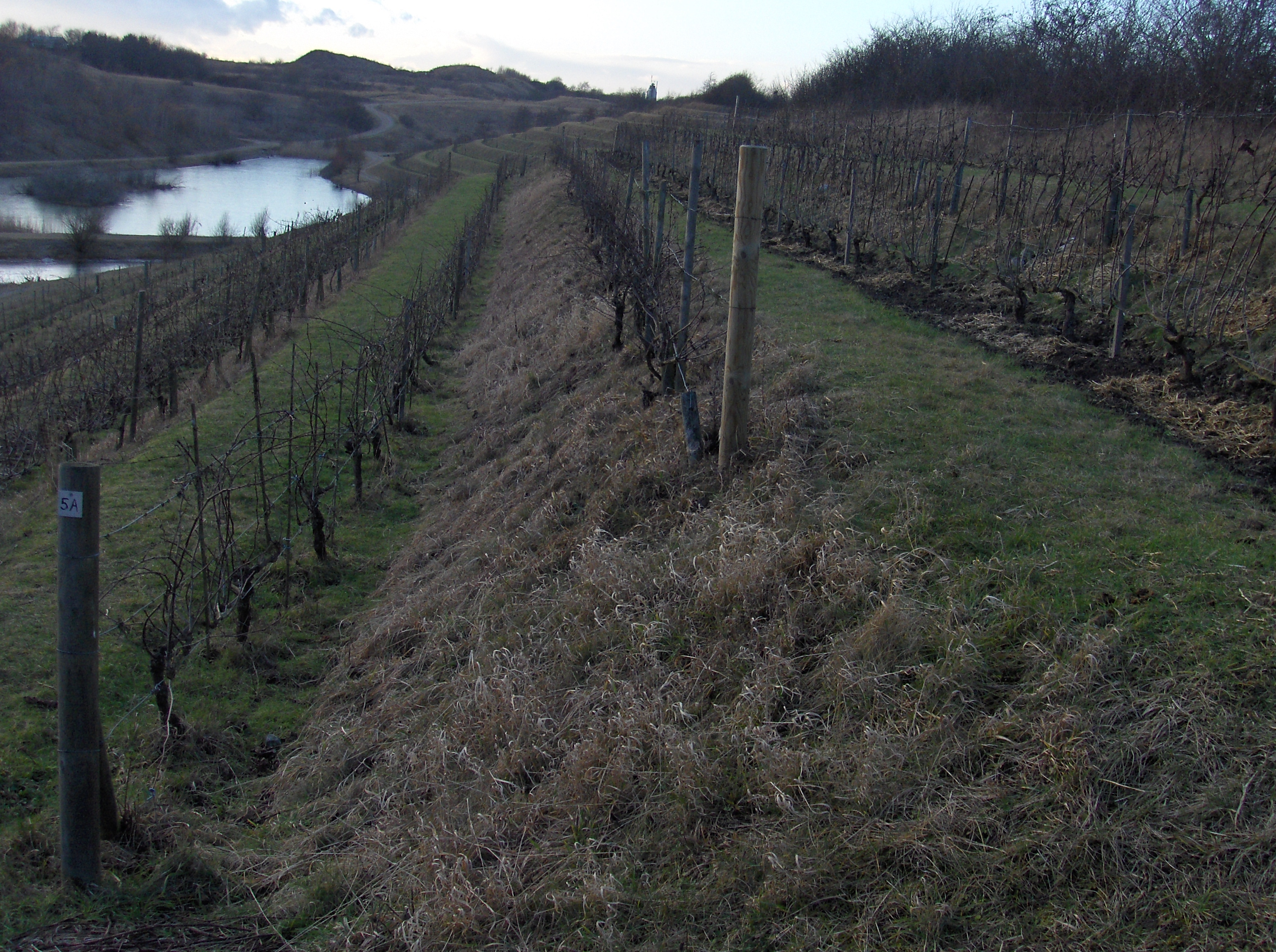
The vineyard

=== Vineyard ===
In 1984, 1,000 grape vines were planted on a southwest-facing slope on the north side of an artificial lake. The number has later been increased to 3,000, of which half are Marechal Foch and half are Léon Millot.

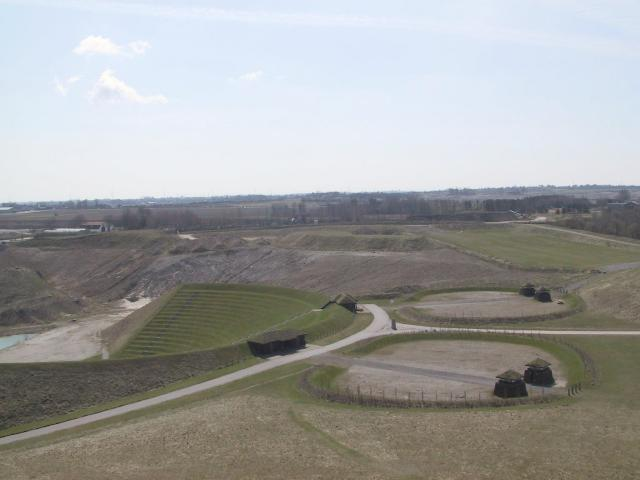
The amphitheatre

=== Amphitheatre ===
The amphitheatre was constructed between 1994 and 1996 and seats 3,500. A self-owning, Hedeland Theater, now Opera Hedeland, was founded on 1 July 2002. It produces an annual opera. Previous performances are Tosca' (2005), Nabucco (2006), Carmen (2007), Turandot The Magic Flute (2009), Norma (2010), La Traviata (2011), Don Giovani (2012), Madame Butterfly (2013), Il trovatore (2014).

=== Golf course ===
Hedeland is also home to an 18-hole golf course. It is operated by Hedeland Golf Club.

=== Temple of Tokamak ===
The Temple of Tokamak, designed by Annie-Locke Scherer, is a structure originally built by participants of the participatory art event The Borderland in 2019. The inspiration for its design was a Tokamak reactor, a torus-shaped device that generates a powerful magnetic field to create fusion. This is meant to be a symbol of the unifying forces of humanity that bring us together. This project was fully funded by Borderland art grants.

The Temple of Tokamak is an example of parametric modeling techniques used for architectural and structural design.

== Cultural references ==
One of the old gravel pits in Hedeland is used as a location at 1:30:13 in the 1969 Olsen-banden film The Olsen Gang in a Fix.

== See also ==
- Køge Bugt Strandpark
- Hedebo Greenway
