= Rasmus Tholstrup =

Danish dairy manufacturer

- Born: Rasmus Peder Rasmussen Tholstrup; 15 November 1861; Albøge Parish, Djursland, Denmark
- Died: 20 December 1929 (aged 68); Roskilde, Denmark
- Citizenship: Danish
- Occupation: Cheesemaker
- Known for: Founder of Tholstrup Cheese a/s

Rasmus Peder Rasmussen Tholstrup (15 November 1861 – 20 December 1929) was a Danish dairy manufacturer and founder of Tholstrup Cheese a/s, one of the leading suppliers of cheese in Denmark.

== Early and personal life ==
Tholstrup was born in Djursland on 15 November 1861 as the son of a farmer. His first experiences with the preparation of butter and cheese was in his mother's kitchen, where she would keep a brass kettle over the fire on Djursland in the mid-1800s. He thus decided to dedicate his life to cheese-making and traveled around the world to gain experience and knowledge.

Tholstrup married Sørine Larsen (1871–1946), with whom he had eight children, Henrik (1893), Lili (1894), Laurits (1896), Poul (1898), Hans (1901), Erik (1902), Knud (1904), and Jacob (1906). Tholstrup and his wife Sørine were also active in the Christian Science movement, were members of the Retsforbundet and known as political debaters.

== Professional career ==
Trained as a dairyman and having important qualities such as courage, curiosity, drive, and willpower; Tholstrup soon got his footing in dairy operations and founded the Tholstrup Dairy in Karlslunde in 1893. He then became the manager of various increasingly large dairies, first in Southern Jutland, then in Zealand, where he seriously started with cheese production. It was initially about low-fat cottage cheese, a hand-kneaded skimmed milk cheese. Inspired by Italian cheeses, Tholstrup began making blue cheese, which he established in 1893 under the name Castello Creamy Blue, currently known simply as the Castello cheeses. Later he became one of the first to throw himself over to the sliced cheese and developed Dansk Schweitzer and, among other things, Table cheese. They did not have any of these recipes, so experiments and bets had to be made, and in fact, Tholstrup invested in experimenting and developing its products. His cheeses quickly garnered silver medals, the highest recognition.

In the early days, the dairy was private with Tholstrup as lessee. When it later became a cooperative dairy, milk from several herds with different fat content began to be mixed with the continuous centrifuge that had been developed at Maglekilde Maskinfabrik in Roskilde by designer I.C. Nielsen; this change was important for the co-operative movement, as it reduced the costs of production. Tholstrup, however, only had two main interests: High hygiene at the dairy and high-quality milk, since the necessity of both for successful dairy production where relevant, as he argued eagerly in journals. As far as the quality of the milk was concerned, he became more and more concerned with the problems surrounding the correct feed composition.

In 1908, Tholstrup switched to large-scale pig breeding, buying two large farms in Himmelev near Roskilde in 1916, and within just two years, he already had established pig herds of 1,500 pigs, and developed a successful pig feed brand: Svineheld.

After the dairy had become a co-operative dairy in 1918, production grew, and they expanded in 1925 with a major rebuild, in which a machine and foam hall were added, and overall the building was extensively renovated. This conversion was inspired by the movement "Bedre byggeskik", an association formed in 1915 to beautify buildings in the countryside. The central building raised its floor and unloaded ramps for the milkers. Initially, the gable wall was torn down every time new machines were to be brought in, but over time a gate was built into the gable instead. The dairy was continued by his oldest son Henrik and thanks to the expansion of both, Tholstrup Cheese is today one of the largest suppliers of quality cheese in Denmark.

Even though his schooling had only been a few hours every other day until his 13th birthday, Tholstrup went to work in a highly scientific manner and even learned to speak foreign languages in order to be informed through foreign journals.

== Death ==
Tholstrup died in Roskilde on 20 December 1929, at the age of 68. In his obituary, it was written, among other things: "Tholstrup appeared as a star of high rank and brilliance. Not only here in the region and in the entire country alone, but far beyond its borders, this peculiar man was known and treasured as the wise and enterprising man he was."

== Legacy ==
He also developed the cheese that was later named Samsø, but that does not originate on the island. The cheese was a so-called Swiss cheese and it was named Dansk Samsø in 1952 because the Madebjerggård Dairy on Samsø produced a particularly good Swiss at the time. It was then that all major cheese types were given uniform names by law from the Ministry of Agriculture.

His son Henrik received a recognition award in 1963 for his massive effort in making the Castello blue cheese popular not only in Denmark, but all over the world.

In 1993, the Tholstrup family celebrated their 100 years and 3 generations in cheese by publishing a jubilee book written by Annette Tholstrup.
