= Castello cheeses =

Danish cheese brand

Castello
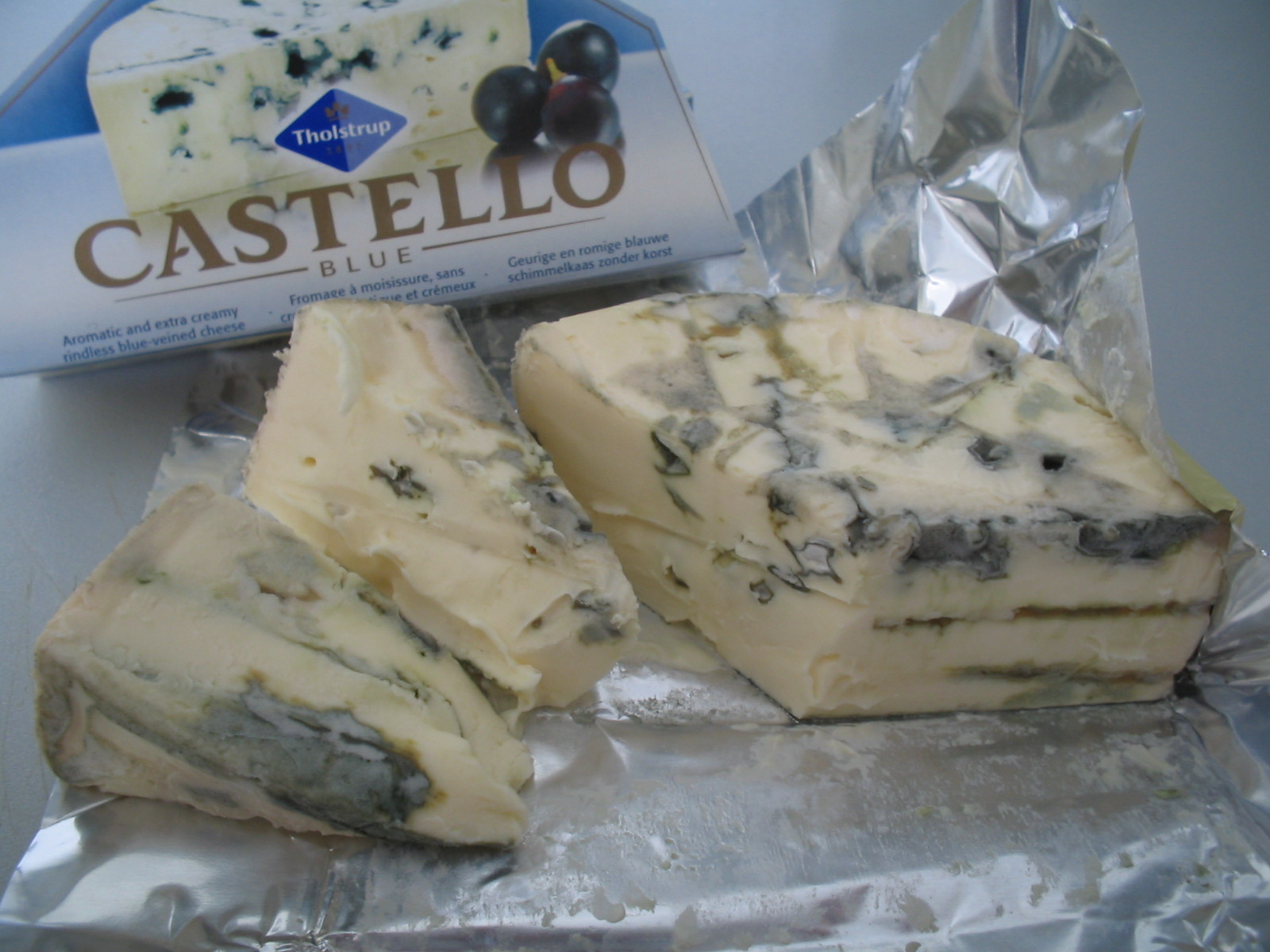
- Country of origin: Denmark
- Pasteurized: Yes
- Texture: Soft

Castello is a brand of cheeses produced by Arla Foods amba, a Danish-Swedish agricultural marketing co-operative based in Viby, Aarhus. Worldwide, a variety of cheeses are marketed under the Castello name, including semi-soft cheeses, semi hard cheeses, blue cheeses, and cream cheeses.

For the European market, Castello markets soft ripened cheeses called Golden and White; Organic Brie; semi hard cheeses Herrgård and Präst; blue cheeses Black, Creamy Blue, Danablu, Danablu Gold, Organic Blue, Organic Mild; and a line of cream cheeses.

For the North American market, Castello markets a Camembert, a Brie, and several varieties of blue cheese, named Noble Blue Cheese, Extra Danish Creamy Blue (also available sliced), Soft Blue, and Crumbled Blue Cheese. In 2012, the Denmark's Finest Havarti Cheeses were added to the Castello brand, followed by Saga Blue Brie in 2013.

The Alps Selection Cheeses; Hirten, Bergkase, and Weissbier, were launched in the United States in the end of 2012, and were the first of their kind available in the United States. In some markets, the name Blue Castello is used for a triple cream blue cow's milk cheese.

== History ==
Castello was established in 1893 by Rasmus Tholstrup of Denmark. His son, Henrik, bought a Swedish dairy and produced the popular Bianco cheese, followed by the Castello cheese, a white cheese that was developed over ten years before its debut. In 1958, Henrik expanded the cheese brand, with the purchase of several dairies in Denmark. After four years, the number of Castello cheeses produced per day had increased to 2,200. Thirty years later, 60,000 Castello cheeses were being produced every day.

In 1963, Henrik received the Danish Cheesemonger's award, having made “A tremendous effort by introducing the new Castello cheese, which has made Danish cheese production highly successful and in a few years has gained remarkable popularity both in Denmark and abroad.” Castello was acquired by Arla Foods, who expanded Castello into cheese markets in North America.

== Blue cheese production ==
Castello blue cheeses were developed in the 1960s. The curds are dipped into salt water, drained, and put into molds. The cheese is punctured with tiny holes and then brought into the ripening room, where it stays for about 15 days. It is then washed, cut, packed, and put in a "cooling room" for about a week at a temperature close to freezing. The washed rind hosts various molds that add to the cheese's mildly spicy flavor. It has a smooth, rich texture much like Brie.

== Awards ==
=== 2005, 2004, 2003, 2002, 2001 ===
American Culinary Institute Gold Medal “Best Taste” Award: According to a blind taste test conducted by American Culinary Chefs (ACC), the nation's best tasting imported Blue cheese is Castello:Rosenborg. Castello:Rosenborg has been honoured as the best tasting by ACC five consecutive years.

=== 2003, 2002, 2001 ===
American Tasting Institute: Castello Rosenborg Danish Blue Cheese, Extra Creamy Danish Blue Cheese, and Mellow Blue Danish Cheese won “Gold Medal” and “Best of Show.”

=== 1998 ===
Wisconsin Cheese Makers World Championship Contest: 3rd Place Blue Cheese – Traditional Danish Blue Cheese, Rosenborg® brand.

=== 1996 ===
Wisconsin Cheese Makers World Championship Contest: World's Best Blue Cheese – Extra Creamy Danish Blue Cheese, Rosenborg® brand.

=== 1994 ===
Wisconsin Cheese Makers World Championship Contest: World's Best Cheese Overall – Extra Creamy Danish Blue Cheese, Rosenborg brand. 3rd Place Blue Cheese – Traditional Danish Blue Cheese, Rosenborg brand.

=== 1992 ===
Wisconsin Cheese Makers World Championship Contest: World's Best Cheese Overall – Extra Creamy Danish Blue Cheese, Rosenborg® brand.

=== 1990 ===
Wisconsin Cheese Makers World Championship Contest: World's Best Blue Cheese – Traditional Danish Blue Cheese, Rosenborg® brand.

=== 1986 ===
Wisconsin Cheese Makers World Championship Contest: Traditional Danish Blue wins “Best of Class.”

=== 1980 ===
Wisconsin Cheese Makers World Championship Contest: Traditional Danish Blue wins “World Championship.”

== See also ==
- List of cheeses
