= Hans Tholstrup (sailor) =

Danish sailor

Personal information
- Nationality: Danish
- Born: 8 February 1901 Karlslunde, Denmark
- Died: 21 February 1946 (aged 45) Middelfart, Denmark

Sailing career
- Sport: Sailing
- Club: Royal Danish Yacht Club
- Class: 8 Metre

Hans Tholstrup (8 February 1901 – 21 September 1946) was a Danish sailor. He competed in the 8 Metre event at the 1936 Summer Olympics. He was born as the fifth of eight children of Rasmus Tholstrup and Sørine Larsen.
