= Olaf Lodal =

Danish long-distance runner

Personal information
- Nationality: Danish
- Born: 6 July 1885 Tune, Denmark
- Died: 31 August 1969 (aged 84) Chicago, Illinois, United States

Sport
- Sport: Long-distance running
- Event: Marathon

Olaf Lodal (6 July 1885 – 31 August 1969) was a Danish long-distance runner. He competed in the marathon at the 1912 Summer Olympics.
