= Agdlek-class cutter =

Ship class of cutters

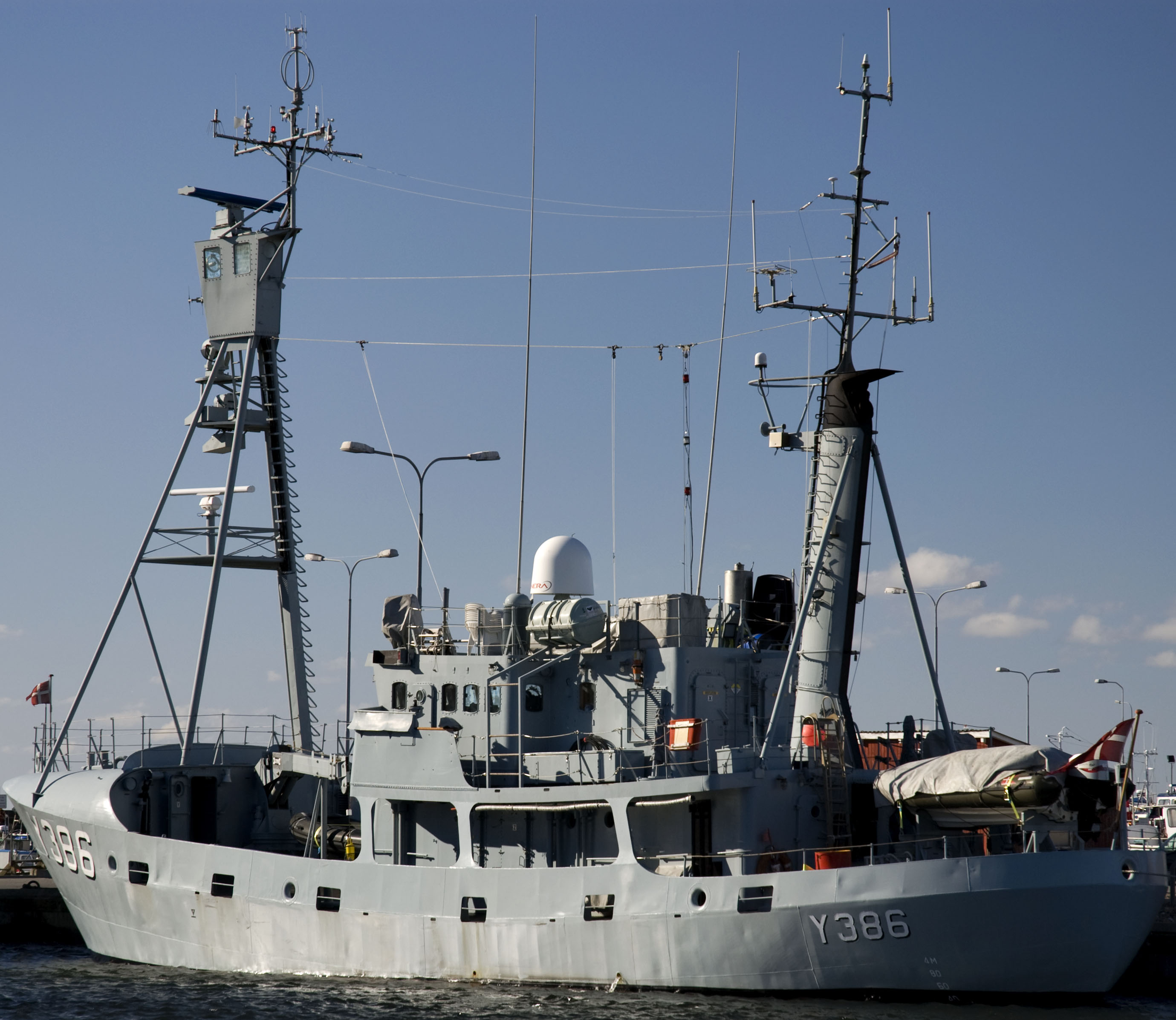
- Y386 Agdlek

Class overview
- Builders: Svendborg Shipyard Ltd.
- Operators: Royal Danish Navy
- Succeeded by: Knud Rasmussen class
- Built: 1973–1974
- In commission: 1974–2017
- Completed: 3
- Retired: 3

General characteristics
- Type: Cutter
- Displacement: 330 tons
- Speed: 11 knots (20 km/h; 13 mph)
- Complement: 14
- Armament: 12.7 mm automatic weapons

The Agdlek-class cutter is a ship class of cutters built for and operated by the Royal Danish Navy for patrol duty in the waters of Greenland. The cutters were replaced one for one with the much larger Knud Rasmussen-class patrol vessel.

These three ice-strengthened vessels are 330 tons, travel at less than 11 knots (20 km/h; 13 mph); are crewed by a complement of 14; and are armed by 12.7-millimetre (0.50 in) automatic weapons. Normally two vessels will be on station, while the third would be on its way to, returning from, or being serviced in its homeport, back in Denmark.

== List of ships ==
| Pennant number | Name | Launched | Commissioned | Decommissioned |
|---|---|---|---|---|
| Y386 | Agdlek | 30 September 1973 | 12 March 1974 | 23 April 2008 |
| Y387 | Agpa | 15 March 1974 | 14 May 1974 | 25 March 2009 |
| Y388 | Tulugaq | 20 October 1978 | 26 June 1979 | 1 December 2017 |
