= HDMS Tulugaq =

Royal Danish Navy cutter

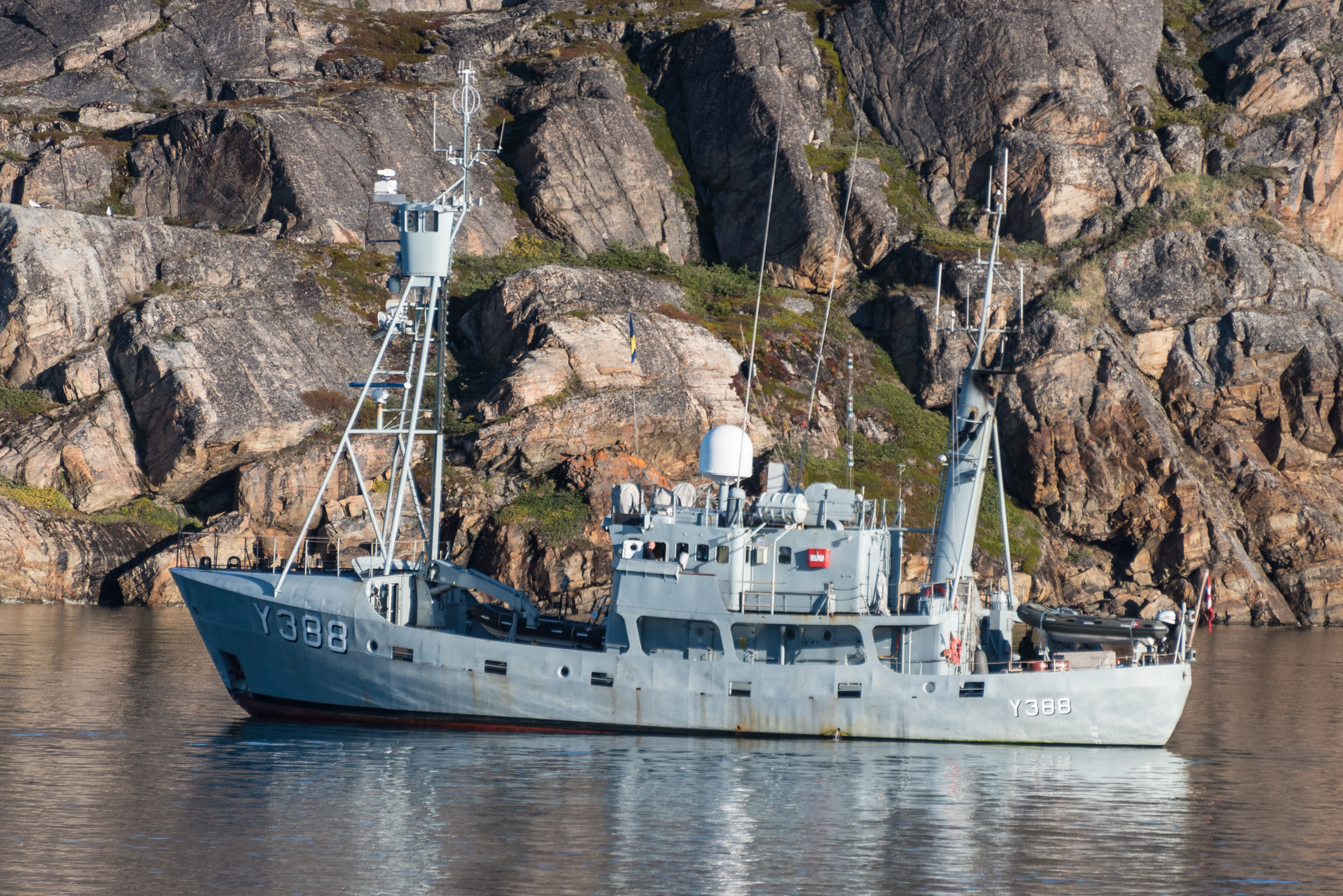
- HDMS Tulugaq (Y388) in Sisimiut Harbor, Greenland on September 4, 2017, prior to decommissioning.

History

Kingdom of Denmark
- Name: Tulugaq
- Builder: Svendborg Shipyard Ltd.
- Laid down: 22 May 1978
- Launched: 20 September 1978
- Commissioned: 26 June 1979
- Decommissioned: 1 December 2017
- Identification: MMSI number: 219528000; Callsign: OUGU

General characteristics
- Class & type: Agdlek-class cutter
- Displacement: 330 tons
- Complement: 12

HDMS Tulugaq [Du-lou-ack] (Kalaallisut: Winter Raven) was a Royal Danish Navy Agdlek-class cutter which until 21 December 2017 was stationed in Greenland. On 22 December 2017, she was sold by an internet auction into private ownership.
