= Greve Strand =

Town in Zealand, Denmark

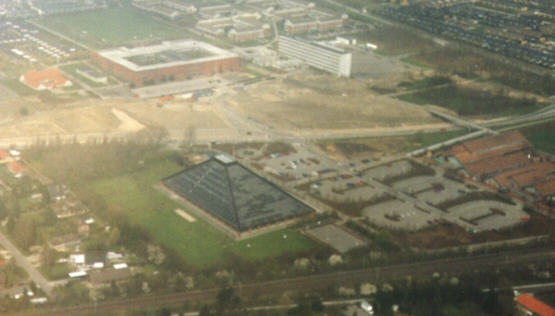
- Aerial view of Greve parish

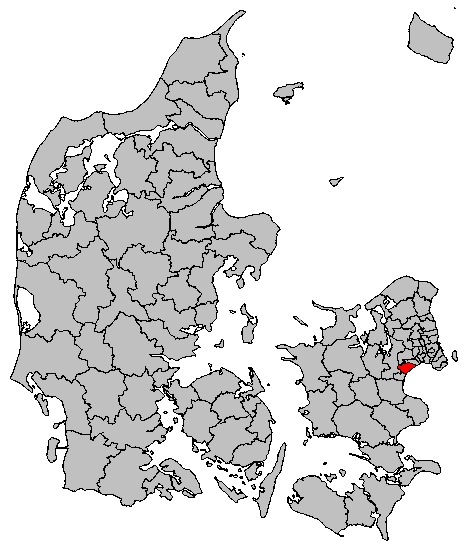
- Coordinates: 55°34′N 12°18′E
- Country: Denmark
- Region: Zealand (Sjælland)
- Municipality: Greve

Government
  - Mayor: Pernille Beckmann

Area
  - Total: 22.1 km^{2} (8.5 sq mi)

Population (1. January 2026)
  - Total: 46,106
  - Density: 2,090/km^{2} (5,400/sq mi)
- Time zone: UTC+1 (Central Europe Time)
  - Summer (DST): UTC+2

Greve Strand (commonly also known simply as Greve) is a Danish town, seat of the Greve Municipality, in the Region Sjælland. Its population is 46,106 (1. January 2026).

== History ==
Until the 1960s, the area was primarily agricultural: most businesses in town were concentrated along the coastal road "Strandvejen".

== Geography ==
Greve Strand is located on the eastern side of the Zealand island, not too far (approx. 25 km) from Copenhagen and is a part of its urban area.

== Notable people ==
- Max Jørgensen (1923 in Kildebrønde – 1992) a Danish cyclist, competed in the team pursuit at the 1948 Summer Olympics
- Rune Ohm (born 1980 in Greve) a Danish handball player
- Mie Lacota (born 1988 in Greve) a professional road and track cyclist
- Nadia Offendal (born 1994 in Greve) a Danish handball player
- Andreas Bruus (born 1999 in Greve) a Danish footballer
- Amalie Magelund (born 2000) a Danish badminton player, lives in Greve

== See also ==
- Greve railway station
