= HDMS Agdlek =

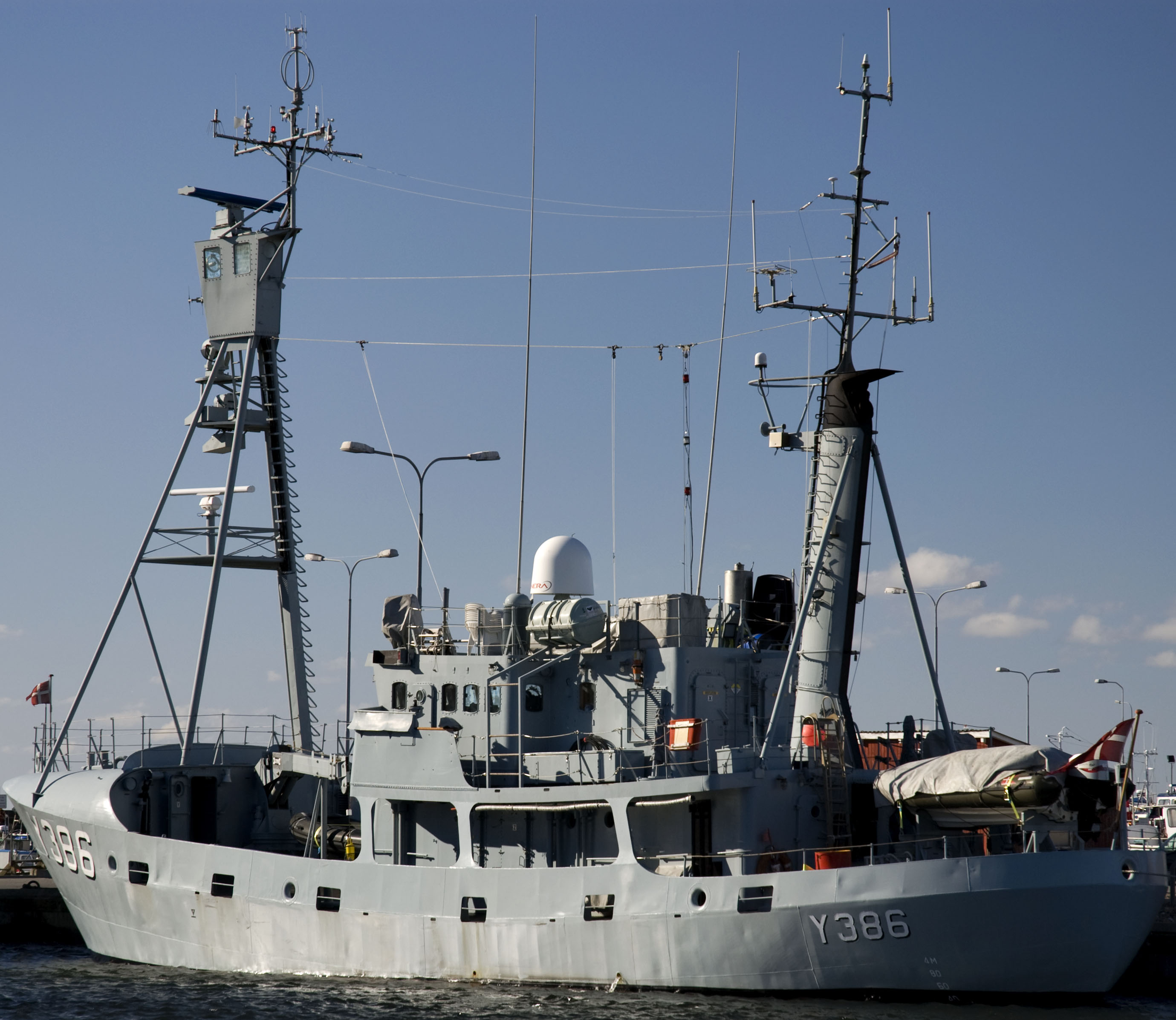
- HDMS Agdlek (Y386)

History

Kingdom of Denmark
- Name: Agdlek
- Builder: Svendborg Shipyard Ltd.
- Laid down: 6 July 1973
- Launched: 30 October 1973
- Commissioned: 12 March 1974
- Decommissioned: 23 April 2008
- Identification: IMO number: 8739619; MMSI number: 231005000; Callsign: OW2127
- Fate: Sold at auction for DKK 2,725,000

General characteristics
- Class & type: Agdlek-class cutter
- Displacement: 330 tons
- Complement: 12

HDMS Agdlek [Ash-laerc] (from Greenlandic alleq "long-tailed duck") was the lead ship of the Agdlek class of arctic patrol cutter in the Royal Danish Navy. Agdlek was commissioned in March 1974 and decommissioned in April 2008 after 34 years of service.

== Sources ==
- "AGDLEK (1974-2008)". 16 August 2008.
