= HDMS Agpa =

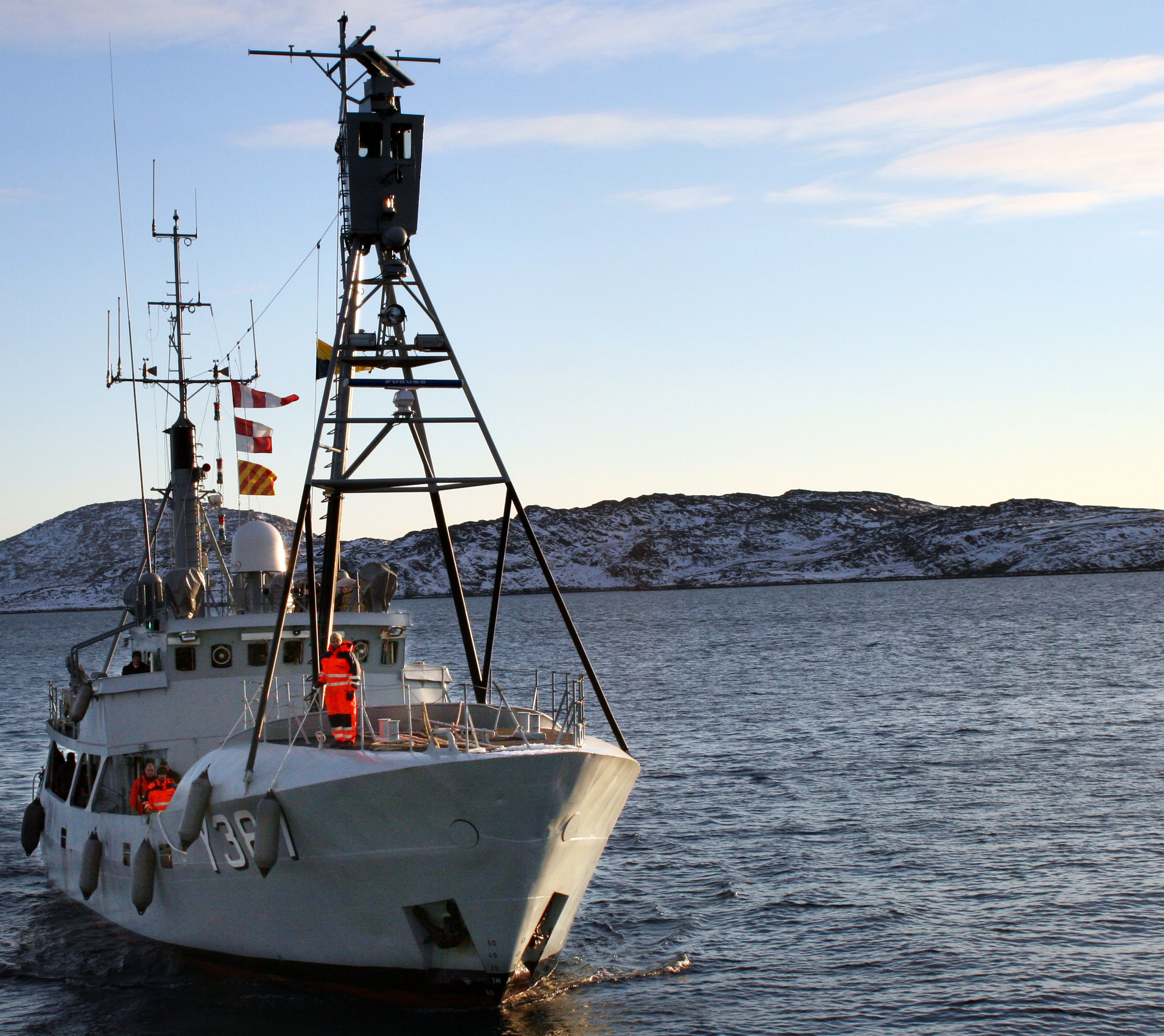

History

Kingdom of Denmark
- Name: Agpa
- Builder: Svendborg Shipyard Ltd.
- Laid down: 2 November 1973
- Launched: 15 March 1974
- Commissioned: 14 May 1974
- Decommissioned: 25 March 2009
- Identification: MMSI number: 219527000; Callsign: OUGY
- Fate: Sold at auction for DKK 1,400,000

General characteristics
- Class & type: Agdlek-class cutter
- Displacement: 330 tons
- Complement: 12

HDMS Agpa [Ap-pa] ((in Greenlandic): common guillemot) was an Agdlek-class cutter of the Royal Danish Navy that was used primarily on arctic patrols from Greenland.
