= Tune, Denmark =

Tune
- Town
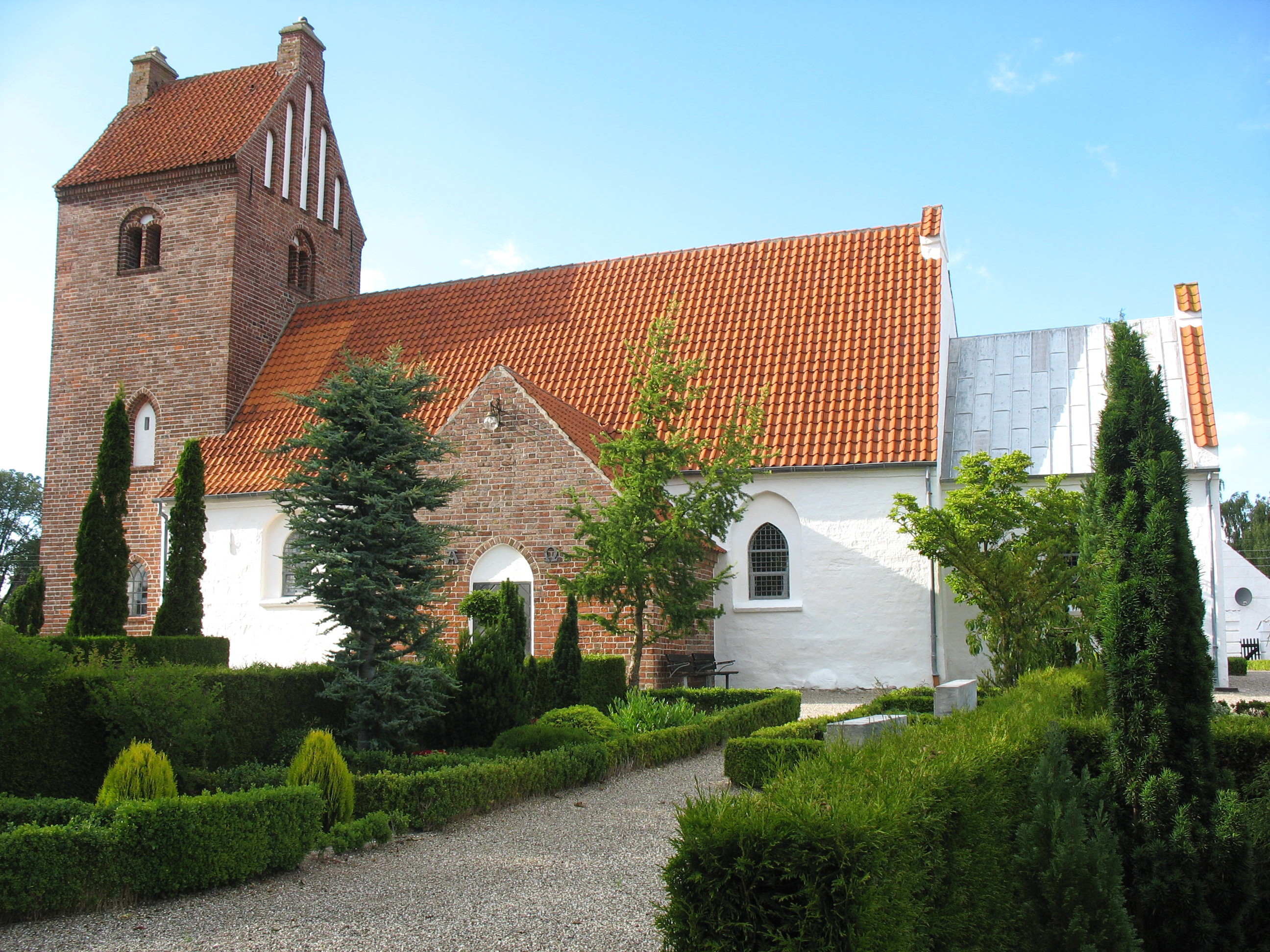
- Tune Church

- Location in Denmark Tune (Denmark Region Zealand)
- Coordinates: 55°35′37″N 12°10′12″E
- Country: Denmark
- Region: Zealand (Sjælland)
- Municipality: Greve

Area
  - Urban: 2.5 km^{2} (0.97 sq mi)

Population (2026)
  - Urban: 5,681
  - Urban density: 2,300/km^{2} (5,900/sq mi)
  - Gender: 2,801 males and 2,880 females
- Time zone: UTC+1 (CET)
  - Summer (DST): UTC+2 (CEST)
- Postal code: DK-4030 Tune

Tune is a town in Greve Municipality, located 5 km southeast of Roskilde and 26 km southwest of Copenhagen City Hall Square, in metropolitan Copenhagen, Denmark. It is mainly known for its airport. As of 2026, the town has a population of 5,681.

== History ==
Tune is one of the oldest settlements in the area with a history that dates back at least 1800 years. Tune was a large village, with mostly farms. It was also an intermediate station for the kings, traveling from Roskilde to the natural harbor at Mosede at the Bay of Køge.

Founded in 1866, Gjøes Folkehøjskole was the first folk high school to open in the Greve area. It was later converted into an agricultural school under the name Tune Landboskole.

== Description ==
Tune is mainly a residential town with mostly single-family detached homes but there are also small commercial and industrial areas. The original village with winding streets and old houses is located on a small hill in the western part of the town. Tune Church dates from the 12th century.

Facilities include two schools, one for 0-5th grade and the other 5-9th grade, a small mall with a public library, two supermarkets, a couple of cloth shops, two real estate agents, a restaurant and three pizzerias, a bank and other shops. Tune Hallerne is the local sports venue. Roskilde Racing Center is also located near the town.

== Surroundings ==
The vast recreational area Hedeland is located to the northwest of Tune. The Hedebo Greenway will pass the town on its way from Roskilde Fjord to the Bay of Køge.

== Notable people ==
- Olaf Lodal (1885 in Tune – 1969) a Danish long-distance runner, competed in the marathon at the 1912 Summer Olympics
