= Karlslunde =

Coordinates: 55°34′N 12°14′E

Karlslunde is a suburb 25 km (16 mi) south-west of central Copenhagen, Denmark. The suburb is a part of Greve municipality. Karlslunde is generally divided into Karlslunde Landsby and Karlslunde Strand split by Karlslunde Landevej (Taastrupvejen). The suburb is connected with the S-train network lines A and E.

The city has a fairly rich history, since the Danish king Svend Grathe in 1153 fought an important battle against the Wends in Karlslunde, in which he defeated them. Karlslunde was also part of Tunestillingen which was a defensive line to protect Copenhagen against a possible attack from the Germans under World War I. Mosede Fort (also in Karlslunde) is an old fort which was a key part of this defensive line. Mosede Fort also has a very interesting interactive museum where you can learn more about Tunestillingen and the central role Karlslunde played in it.

== Notable people ==
- Simon Rieche Taarning (born 1763 in Weissheim, Germany) a German priest who came to Karlslunde in the early 1800s. Known for having 21 children with 21 wives all in Karlslunde
- Vilhelm Pedersen (born 1820 in Karlslunde – 1859) a painter and illustrator of the fairy tales of Hans Christian Andersen
- Hans Tholstrup (1901 in Karlslunde – 1946) a Danish sailor, competed at the 1936 Summer Olympics
- Michael Christensen (born 1990 in Karlslunde) a Danish racing driver
