= Greve Municipality =

Greve Municipality Greve Kommune (Danish)
- Municipality
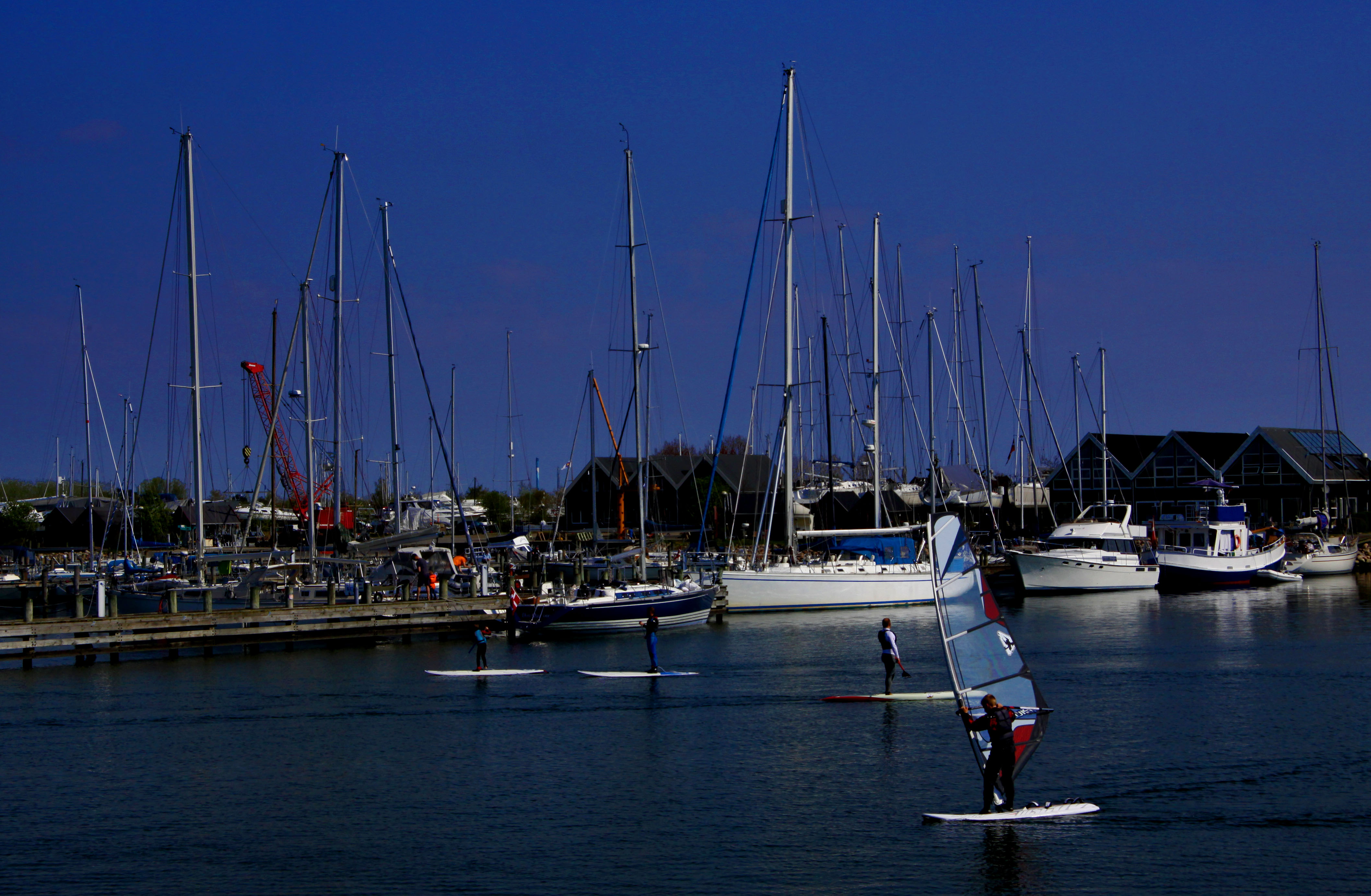

- Coat of arms

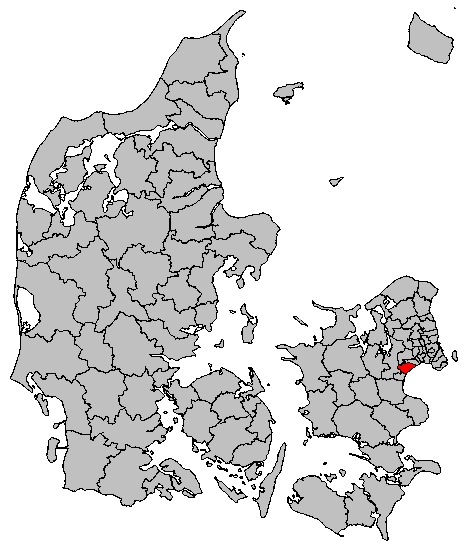
- Coordinates: 55°35′02″N 12°17′43″E
- Country: Denmark
- Region: Zealand
- Established: 1 April 1970
- Seat: Greve Strand

Government
  - Mayor: Pernille Beckmann (V)

Area
  - Total: 60.18 km^{2} (23.24 sq mi)

Population (1 January 2026)
  - Total: 54,120
  - Density: 899.3/km^{2} (2,329/sq mi)
- Time zone: UTC+1 (CET)
  - Summer (DST): UTC+2 (CEST)
- Postal code: 2670
- Municipal code: 253
- Website: greve.dk

Greve Municipality (Danish: Greve Kommune) is a kommune about 21 km south-west of Copenhagen in Region Sjælland on the east coast of the island of Zealand (Sjælland) in eastern Denmark. The municipality covers an area of 60 km^{2}, and has a total population of 54,120 (2026).

The site of its municipal council is the town of Greve Strand.

It serves primarily as a residential municipality, functioning as a suburb for the larger Copenhagen area.

== History ==
Until the 1960s the area was primarily agricultural, and most businesses in town were concentrated along the coastal road "Strandvejen". With numerous holiday cottages near the coast of Køge Bugt (Køge Bay), this was also the destination for many inhabitants of Copenhagen on holiday away from the hustle and bustle of the city.

During the late 1960s and into the 1970s, many people moved permanently out of Copenhagen and into new homes in places like Greve. What was formerly farmers' fields quickly turned into districts of detached houses, whilst most of the shops and similar businesses near the coastal road moved into central shopping malls such as Hundige Storcenter and Greve Midtby Center. Around 1980 the S-train railroad network was expanded towards Køge, and the stations Greve and Hundige were placed adjacent to the shopping malls.

Greve Municipality was formed in 1970, as part of the kommunalreform ("Municipal Reform") of that year. It was established by combining the following parishes:

- Greve
- Hundige
- Karlslunde
- Karlslunde Strand
- Kildebrønde
- Mosede
- Tune

Greve municipality was one of the municipalities that was not merged 1 January 2007 in the nationwide Kommunalreformen ("The Municipal Reform" of 2007).

== Locations ==
Greve Strand	43,300
Tune	5,300
Greve Landsby	720
Kildebrønde	380

== Politics ==
Greve's municipal council consists of 21 members, elected every four years. The municipal council has six political committees.

=== National results ===
	Blue Bloc	Red Bloc	Other
1998	17,629 (58.5%)	12,429 (41.3%)	63 (0.2%)
2001	20,235 (65.7%)	10,542 (34.3%)	0 (0%)
2005	18,764 (64.2%)	10,109 (34.6%)	355 (1.2%)
2007	19,482 (64.9%)	10,558 (35.1%)	0 (0%)
2011	18,938 (62.2%)	11,529 (37.8%)	4 (0%)
2015	18,986 (62.5%)	11,369 (37.4%)	16 (0.1%)
2019	15,658 (51.6%)	13,147 (43.3%)	1,552 (5.1%)

=== Municipal council ===
Below are the municipal councils elected since the Municipal Reform of 2007.

=== 2005 election results ===
2005 local election results:

Party	Votes	%	+/–	Seats
Venstre	10,170	41.55	–5.0	8
Social Democrats	6,682	27.30	+1.1	6
Danish People's Party	2,653	10.84	+1.6	2
The Conservative People's Party	2,055	8.40	+0.6	2
Socialist People's Party	1,088	4.44	–1.3	1
Danish Social Liberal Party	987	4.03	+4.0	1
Borgerlisten	358	1.46	+1.5	–
Red–Green Alliance	304	1.24	+1.2	–
Other	180	0.74		–
Total	24,477	100.00	–	20
Registered voters/turnout	35,886	68.8%		
Source: KMD, KMD

=== 2009 election results ===
2009 local election results:

Party	Votes	%	+/–	Seats	+/–
Venstre	8,449	35.40	–6.1	8	0
Social Democrats	5,610	23.51	–3.8	5	–1
The Conservative People's Party	3,786	15.86	+7.5	4	+2
Socialist People's Party	2,669	11.18	+6.8	2	+1
Danish People's Party	2,632	11.03	+0.2	2	0
Danish Social Liberal Party	459	1.92	–2.1	–	–1
Borgerlisten	184	0.77	–0.7	–	–
Other	75	0.31	–0.4	–	–
Total	23,864	100.00	–	21	–
Registered voters/turnout	35,997	67.0			
Source: KMD, KMD

=== 2013 election results ===
2013 local election results:

Party	Votes	%	+/–	Seats	+/–
Venstre	9,782	36.33	+0.9	9	+1
Social Democrats	5,866	21.79	–1.7	5	0
Danish People's Party	4,228	15.70	+4.7	3	+1
The Conservative People's Party	2,510	9.32	–6.6	2	–2
Red–Green Alliance	988	3.67	+3.7	1	+1
Borgerliberale i Greve	915	3.40	+3.4	–	+0
Socialist People's Party	913	3.39	–7.8	–	–2
Liberal Alliance	617	2.29	+2.3	1	+1
Tune Borgerliste	586	2.18	+3.4	–	–
Danish Social Liberal Party	521	1.93	0.0	–	–
Total	26,926	100.00	–	21	–
Registered voters/turnout	36,935	74.2			
Source: KMD, KMD

=== 2017 election results ===
2017 local election results:

Party	Votes	%	+/–	Seats	+/–
Venstre	9,951	36.59	+0.3	9	0
Social Democrats	7,861	28.91	+7.1	7	+2
Danish People's Party	3,274	12.04	–3.7	2	–1
The Conservative People's Party	1,400	5.15	–4.2	1	–1
Red–Green Alliance	1,102	4.05	+0.3	1	0
Liberal Alliance	886	3.26	+0.9	1	0
Socialist People's Party	671	2.47	–0.9	–	–
Danish Social Liberal Party	409	1.50	–0.4	–	–
Other	1,639	6.03		–	–
Total	27,193	100.00	–	21	–
Registered voters/turnout	38,610	71.3			
Source: KMD, KMD

=== 2021 election results ===
2021 local election results:

Party	Votes	%	+/–	Seats	+/–
Venstre	9,575	37.70	+1.11	9	0
Social Democrats	6,941	27.33	–1.58	6	–1
The Conservative People's Party	3,055	12.03	+6.88	2	+1
Danish People's Party	1,570	6.18	–5.86	1	–1
Red–Green Alliance	1,136	4.47	+0.42	1	0
New Right	974	3.84	+3.84	1	+1
Socialist People's Party	954	3.76	+1.29	1	+1
Danish Social Liberal Party	539	2.12	+0.62	0	–1
Liberal Alliance	189	0.74	–2.52	–	–
Other	464	1.83	–4.20	–	–
Total	25,397	100.00	–	21	–
Registered voters/turnout	39,331	65.4			
Source: KMD, KMD
