= 2007–08 Danish Superliga =

18th season of Danish Superliga

SAS Ligaen
- Season: 2007–08
- Champions: AaB; 3rd Superliga title 3rd top-flight Danish title
- Relegated: Viborg FF; Lyngby BK
- Champions League: AaB (Second qualifying round)
- UEFA Cup: Brøndby IF (First qualifying round; via Danish Cup); FC Midtjylland (First qualifying round); F.C. Copenhagen (First qualifying round); FC Nordsjælland (First qualifying round; via Fair Play)
- Intertoto Cup: OB (second round)
- Goals scored: 543
- Average goals/game: 2.74
- Top goalscorer: Jeppe Curth (17)
- Biggest home win: FC Midtjylland 5–0 Brøndby IF (2007-07-29); Randers FC 5–0 AaB (2007-08-01)
- Biggest away win: Viborg FF 0–5 Esbjerg fB (2007-07-22); Lyngby BK 1–6 Esbjerg fB (2007-08-20)
- Highest scoring: AGF 3–5 AaB (2007-10-08); AaB 5–3 Lyngby BK (2007-12-02); FC Nordsjælland 5–3 Viborg FF (2008-04-27) (8 goals)
- Longest winning run: 6 – AaB (26 August-20 October)
- Longest unbeaten run: 12 – F.C. Copenhagen (25 July-28 October)
- Longest losing run: 7 – Viborg FF (24 September-25 November)
- Highest attendance: 32,153 – F.C. Copenhagen v Brøndby IF (2007-12-02)
- Lowest attendance: 1,501 – Lyngby BK v Randers FC (2008-04-13)
- Average attendance: 8,424

The 2007–08 Danish Superliga season, known officially as the SAS Ligaen for title sponsor Scandinavian Airlines, was the 18th season of the Danish Superliga league championship, which determined the winners of the Danish football championship. It was governed by the Danish Football Association. It started with the first match on July 18, 2007 and ended with the final match on May 24, 2008.

The Danish champions qualified for UEFA Champions League 2008-09. The runners-up and no. 3 qualified for the UEFA Cup 2008-09. The 4th placed team qualified for the UEFA Intertoto Cup 2008. The 11th and 12th placed teams were relegated to the 1st Division. The 1st Division champions and runners-up are promoted to the Superliga.

== Participants ==
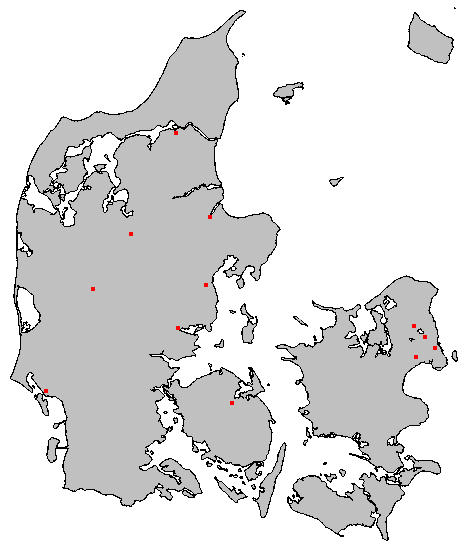

Clubs placed on map

Club	Finishing position last season	First season in top division	First season of current spell in top division
AaB	3rd	1928–29	1987
AC Horsens	10th	1929–30	2005–06
AGF	2nd in 1st Division	1918–19	2007–08
Brøndby IF	6th	1982	1982
Esbjerg fB	7th	1928–29	2001–02
F.C. Copenhagen	1st	1992–93	1992–93
FC Midtjylland	2nd	2000–01	2000–01
FC Nordsjælland	5th	2002–03	2002–03
Lyngby BK	1st in 1st Division	1980	2007–08
OB	4th	1927–28	1999-00
Randers FC	8th	1941–42	2006–07
Viborg FF	9th	1927–28	1998–99

== League table ==
Pos	Team	Pld	W	D	L	GF	GA	GD	Pts	Qualification or relegation
1	AaB (C)	33	22	5	6	60	38	+22	71	Qualification to Champions League second qualifying round
2	Midtjylland	33	18	8	7	53	36	+17	62	Qualification to UEFA Cup first qualifying round
3	Copenhagen	33	17	9	7	51	29	+22	60	Qualification to UEFA Cup first qualifying round
4	OB	33	12	16	5	46	27	+19	52	Qualification to Intertoto Cup second round
5	Horsens	33	14	10	9	47	43	+4	52	
6	Randers FC	33	13	8	12	41	33	+8	47	
7	Esbjerg fB	33	13	6	14	59	54	+5	45	
8	Brøndby (Note: Brøndby qualified for UEFA Cup first qualifying round by winning the 2007–08 Danish Cup.)	33	11	10	12	44	44	0	43	Qualification to UEFA Cup first qualifying round
9	Nordsjælland (Note: Nordsjælland qualified for UEFA Cup first qualifying round via UEFA Fair Play ranking.)	33	11	10	12	47	51	−4	43	Qualification to UEFA Cup first qualifying round
10	AGF	33	7	8	18	33	51	−18	29	
11	Viborg FF (R)	33	5	5	23	29	68	−39	20	Relegation to Danish 1st Division
12	Lyngby Boldklub (R)	33	3	9	21	33	69	−36	18	Relegation to Danish 1st Division

Source: Danish Football Association
Rules for classification: 1) points; 2) goal difference; 3) number of goals scored.
(C) Champions; (R) Relegated

== Results ==
To read this table, the home team is listed in the left-hand column.

Home \ Away	ACH	AGF	BIF	EFB	FCK	FCM	FCN	LBK	OB	RFC	VFF	AAB	ACH	AGF	BIF	EFB	FCK	FCM	FCN	LBK	OB	RFC	VFF	AAB
AC Horsens		0–0	4–2	4–3	3–2	2–1	2–0	2–1	2–2	1–0	1–1	1–1			1–3	3–1		1–1				1–0		1–2
AGF	1–2		1–1	0–1	0–1	2–0	1–2	0–0	0–2	0–0	0–0	3–5	1–2				0–2		3–3	3–1	0–2			
Brøndby IF	3–0	0–1		2–1	0–1	2–1	2–2	3–0	1–1	1–1	1–1	0–1		2–1			2–1		3–0	3–0	0–2	3–1		
Esbjerg fB	1–3	2–2	1–0		2–1	2–0	1–2	2–1	0–0	1–3	2–1	1–2		0–1	3–2			3–2				3–2		1–1
FC Copenhagen	1–0	1–1	1–1	5–2		0–0	1–1	2–0	2–1	1–0	3–1	4–0	1–0			2–1		0–2		3–1		0–1	3–0	
FC Midtjylland	1–1	2–0	5–0	2–2	2–2		1–0	2–1	2–1	3–2	1–0	2–1		3–2	1–1						3–1	2–1	2–1	2–0
FC Nordsjælland	0–0	3–2	1–0	3–1	1–0	1–1		0–1	3–3	2–1	4–0	1–2	1–2			3–2	1–2	0–3		0–0			5–3	
Lyngby BK	0–0	1–3	2–2	1–6	1–4	1–2	0–0		0–3	0–3	2–0	3–4	4–1			1–3		1–2				0–0		0–2
Odense BK	3–3	2–0	0–0	1–1	0–0	0–1	3–0	1–1		0–0	4–0	1–1	2–0			1–1	0–0		1–1	1–1			1–0	
Randers FC	0–0	0–1	2–1	1–0	2–1	3–0	1–1	2–2	0–0		2–0	5–0		4–1					2–1		0–2		0–2	1–0
Viborg FF	2–1	2–0	1–1	0–5	2–3	1–1	2–3	2–1	0–2	0–1		0–1	1–3	0–2	1–2	0–4				3–2				
AaB	1–0	2–0	3–0	2–0	1–1	1–0	2–1	5–3	2–3	3–0	3–2			3–1	2–0		0–0		3–1		2–0		2–0	

Source: Danskfodbold.com

== Season statistics ==
=== Scoring ===
- First goal of the season: Thomas Dalgaard for Randers against Viborg (18 July 2007)
- Fastest goal in a match: Søren Friis (18 seconds) for Horsens against Viborg (14 April 2008)
- Widest Winning Margin: Viborg 0–5 Esbjerg (22 July 2007) / Midtjylland 5–0 Brøndby (29 July 2007) / Randers 5–0 AaB (1 August 2007) / Lyngby 1–6 Esbjerg (20 August 2007)
- Most Goals in a Match: AGF 3–5 AaB (8 October 2007) / AaB 5–3 Lyngby (2 December 2007) / Nordsjælland 5–3 Viborg (27 April 2008)
- First hat-trick of the season: Rajko Lekic for Esbjerg against Viborg (22 July 2007)

=== Cards ===
- First yellow card: Robert Åhman-Persson for Viborg against Randers (18 July 2007)
- First red card: Aílton José Almeida for Copenhagen against Viborg (28 August 2007)
- Fastest red card in a match: Atle Roar Håland (7 seconds) for OB against Horsens (11 May 2008)

=== Attendances ===
Team	Average	Highest	Lowest
Copenhagen	19,454	32,153	13,851
Brøndby	15,906	25,313	9,865
AGF	9,827	14,077	4,148
OB	9,012	14,616	6,149
Midtjylland	8,971	11,763	4,909
AaB	8,945	13,647	4,729
Randers	6,884	11,053	3,815
Esbjerg	6,610	11,008	4,089
Viborg	4,416	6,981	2,952
Nordsjælland	4,197	9,045	2,299
Horsens	3,992	6,700	2,115
Lyngby	2,474	6,955	1,035

== Goals ==
=== Top goalscorers ===
Pos	Player	Club	Goals
1	(Denmark) Jeppe Curth	AaB	17
2	(Denmark) Martin Bernburg	FC Nordsjælland	14
3	(Denmark) Peter Graulund	AGF	13
3	(Denmark) Henrik Hansen	AC Horsens	13
5	(Denmark) Frank Kristensen	FC Midtjylland	12
6	(Faroe Islands) Christian Holst	Lyngby BK	9
6	(Brazil) Gilberto Macena	AC Horsens	9
6	(Denmark) Morten Nordstrand	F.C. Copenhagen	9
6	(Sweden) Rade Prica	AaB	9
10	(Sweden) Marcus Allbäck	F.C. Copenhagen	8
10	(Denmark) Hans Henrik Andreasen	OB	8
10	(Denmark) Mikkel Beckmann	Lyngby BK	8
10	(Canada) Atiba Hutchinson	F.C. Copenhagen	8
10	(Sweden) Rawez Lawan	AC Horsens	8

7 goals

- AaB: Andreas Johansson
- Brøndby IF: Martin Ericsson, Morten "Duncan" Rasmussen
- Esbjerg fB: Njogu Demba-Nyrén, Søren Rieks, Martin Vingaard
- FC Nordsjælland: Issey Nakajima-Farran
- OB: Baye Djiby Fall
- Randers FC: Bédi Buval, Thomas Dalgaard

6 goals

- AaB: Siyabonga Nomvethe
- Esbjerg fB: Jesper Lange, Rajko Lekic, Michaël Murcy
- FC Nordsjælland: Bajram Fetai, Thomas Kristensen
- OB: Jonas Borring
- Randers FC: Marc Nygaard, Tidiane Sane

5 goals

- AaB: Kasper Risgård
- AGF: Dioh Williams
- Brøndby IF: Stefán Gíslason, Chris Katongo
- Esbjerg fB: Jesper Bech
- F.C. Copenhagen: Libor Sionko
- FC Midtjylland: Mikkel Thygesen
- OB: Johan Absalonsen
- Viborg FF: Christian Muomaife

=== Hat-tricks ===
Scorer	Game	Date
(Denmark) Rajko Lekic	Viborg v Esbjerg	22 July 2007
(Denmark) Thomas Dalgaard	Randers v AaB	1 August 2007
(Denmark) Jeppe Curth	AGF v AaB	8 October 2007
(Denmark) Peter Graulund	AGF v Nordsjælland	28 November 2007
(Senegal) Baye Djiby Fall	Lyngby v OB	4 April 2008

== Kits 2007–2008 ==
Team	Kit maker	Shirt sponsor	Notes
AaB	hummel	Spar Nord	Same kits as 06/07 until November 25, 2007 where a new home kit was introduced. It doesn't have the white field on the front, and it also features gold printings.
AC Horsens	hummel	Telia Stofa	Spar Nord and 3-stjernet replaced as sponsors by cable TV company Telia Stofa. New home kit, and new gray/black away kit.
AGF	hummel	Ceres/Faxe Kondi	Same kits as 06/07.
Brøndby IF	adidas	Codan	Same home and 3rd kit as 06/07. New brown away shirt with light blue details.
Esbjerg fB	Umbro	Frøs Herreds Sparekasse	New home kit with several stripes, and strides on the sleeves. Gold printings.
F.C. Copenhagen	Kappa	Carlsberg	New kits with blue collar and gold printings on the back.
FC Midtjylland	Puma	SPAR	New kits in regular PUMA-style.
FC Nordsjælland	H_{2}O	Jyske Bank	Same kits as 06/07 until December 2, 2007, where a new purple home kit was introduced.
Lyngby BK	Nike	Herbalife	New home kit with white sleeves. New red away kit.
OB	Nike	Carlsberg	Same home kit as spring 07. New black away kit.
Randers FC	Umbro	Forenede Rengøring	Same kits as 06/07
Viborg FF	PUMA	Telia	Same kits as 06/07

== Stadiums ==
Team	Stadium	Capacity
F.C. Copenhagen	Parken Stadium	34,098
Brøndby IF	Brøndby Stadium	29,000
AGF	NRGi Park	20,200
OB	Fionia Park	15,761
AaB	Energi Nord Arena	13,800
Esbjerg fB	Blue Water Arena	13,282
Lyngby BK	Lyngby Stadion	12,000
Randers FC	Essex Park Randers	12,000
FC Midtjylland	SAS Arena	11,809
FC Nordsjælland	Farum Park	10,000
Viborg FF	Viborg Stadion	9,566
AC Horsens	Casa Arena Horsens	6,700

== Managerial changes ==
Team	Outgoing manager	Manner of departure	Date of vacancy	Replaced by	Date of appointment
OB	(Scotland) Bruce Rioch	Quit	12 March 2007	(Denmark) Lars Olsen	1 July 2007
Randers FC	(Denmark) Lars Olsen	End of contract	30 June 2007	(England) Colin Todd	1 July 2007
Viborg FF	(Sweden) Anders Linderoth	Mutual consent	9 November 2007	(Sweden) Hans Eklund	1 January 2008

== Promoted teams ==
The following teams were promoted to the Superliga at the end of last season:

- Lyngby BK (Winners of the 1st Division)
- AGF (Runners-up in the 1st Division)

== Relegated teams ==
The following teams were relegated from the Superliga last season:

- Vejle B (Won 2–1 away to AC Horsens on May 24, 2007, but Viborg won also.)
- Silkeborg IF (Drew 1–1 with FC Nordsjælland on May 20, 2007 when they needed a win.)

== See also ==
- 2007-08 in Danish football
- Sports in Denmark
