= History of F.C. Copenhagen =

Danish football club history

The history of F.C. Copenhagen details the development of Danish professional football (soccer) club F.C. Copenhagen. Even though F.C. Copenhagen was founded in 1992, the club traces its roots back to 1876. Kjøbenhavns Boldklub (KB) was founded in 1876, making it one of the oldest football clubs in Continental Europe, and Boldklubben 1903 was founded in 1903. The two Copenhagen clubs merged first teams to found F.C. Copenhagen on 1 July 1992. KB were the very first Danish football champions and won the Danish championship 15 times. B1903 have been champions seven times and won the Danish Cup twice. Both clubs put their mark on Danish football through the 20th century.

== The superstructure ==
Professional football was introduced in Denmark by the Danish Football Association in 1978. KB twice tried to run a professional football business in the 1980s, but on both occasions the club failed to gain enough financial support. Following the club's last Danish championship win in 1980, KB ran dry with football success at the highest level. On the other hand, B1903 had success in the Danish Superliga up until 1992. The club had disappointing attendances with less than 2,000 spectators at home games on average, but in local entrepreneur Alex Friedmann, the club had an important financial supporter. KB was therefore happy to have a team playing professional football, while B1903 had a good squad but a doubtful future, when it was clear that Friedmann was unable to guarantee his support for much longer.

With the rebuilding of the Parken Stadium, Denmark's national team stadium, the new club had a ready-made, top-modern stadium to play at. They moved away from the outdated facilities at Gentofte Stadion and Frederiksberg Idrætspark, where B1903 and KB played, respectively. KB and B1903 maintained a role in F.C. Copenhagen, and became bases for talent development for the professional team of FCK.

=== Scope ===
1992 was a golden year in Denmark's sports history, as the Denmark national football team surprised Europe and won the Euro 92 championship, after replacing the barred Yugoslavia team shortly before tournament kick-off. F.C. Copenhagen therefore set off on a wave of football interest and national football pride.

The first ambition of the club was attaining a high enough placing in the Danish Superliga, as to qualify for one of the European competitions every season. This goal was to be reached through a solid economy build upon a big fan base, and through an "attractive and positive style of football".

== 1992-1994: A good start ==
In the first two seasons of the club, they got good results in the Superliga. In the 1992-93 season, they won the Danish championship only one point ahead of Odense BK in second place, and two points ahead of third placed Brøndby IF. FCK also competed in the UEFA Intertoto Cup and they won their group after 4 wins, 1 draw and a single defeat. With the Intertoto Cup win, FCK qualified for the UEFA Cup, where they were eliminated in 2nd round by AJ Auxerre. In the Cup, FCK was knocked out in the semi-finals by OB with 1-4 agg., after in the 5th round eliminating defending league champions Brøndby and Hvidovre in the quarter-finals.

In the 1993-94 season the expectations were high for FCK, but they could not stand up to the pressure, and went on winter break with a second place, after a quite good season start, which was overshadowed by a 6-0 collapse to A.C. Milan in the Champions League qualification. The cup result had in the autumn also been disappointing after a 3-0 B 1909 defeat. In the spring, Silkeborg IF looked to win the league, but after a hard fight from F.C. Copenhagen, it was very exciting when the two teams met in the second last round, at Parken. In front of a record high attendance (26,679) FCK won the match 4–1, but lost the championship after a 3–2 defeat in the last round.

=== 1995-1997: Three sad years ===
The next three seasons, were sad on results, and only two cup triumphs saved the honour. After the new manager Keld Kristensen came to the club, FCK won only a single of eight league matches in the 1994-95 season, and got a very disappointing 0-1 FC Jazz UEFA Cup-defeat, and this led to the re-hiring of successful manager Benny Johansen. After a very disappointing autumn, with elimination in the UEFA Cup by Slovan Bratislava, they went to the winter break in 7th place. The spring season wasn't much better, and they ended 6th. After the weak season the team won the Cup final against AB with a superior 5–0 win, qualifying for the European football once again, despite the otherwise mediocre results in the league.

With new manager Michael Schäfer, FCK was near relegation in the 1995-96 season. In the Cup Winners' Cup they lost totally 2–7 to SK Hradec Králové, and in the Superliga they ended 7th. In the cup they lost to AGF. After the season Schäfer was fired as manager.

Instead of Schäfer, Kim Brink took over the poor performing FCK-team. This season should be as the last. FCK competed in the Intertoto Cup, but 3 wins and a draw, was not enough to continue to the UEFA Cup. The only thing to be happy about for the team was the cup sensation, in which they won the final against Ikast FS with 2–0. In the league, they once again ended up as number 7th way below the club's ambitions of grandeur.

== 1997-1998: The Don Ø take-over ==
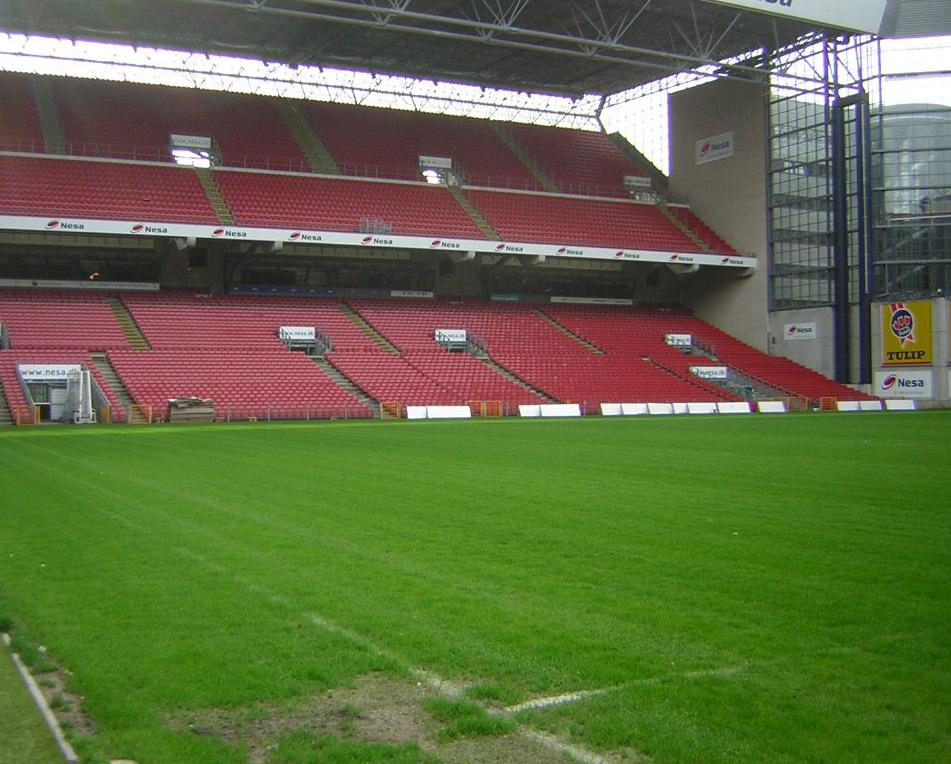
Parken.

In the new season, FCK got a new CEO and Chairman, Flemming Østergaard, lovingly referred to as Don Ø by the club's fans for his mafioso-like antics, and a new manager, Kent Karlsson. With Don Ø in front, the economy of the club came under control, and as the season drew to an end, F.C. Copenhagen bought their stadium, Parken. In November 1997, FCK was introduced on the Copenhagen Stock Exchange through a successful IPO.

On the pitch the team had a very fine autumn, in which they only lost three games. In the Cup Winners' Cup, they lost to Real Betis, and in the Danish Cup, FCK went to the final, where they lost to the arch rivals Brøndby. The spring season was not as good as the autumn, and FCK ended third.

=== 1998-2000: There is something about Jutland ===
In the 1998-99 season, FCK was close on European success in the Cup Winners' Cup. After a 10-0 (over two legs) victory against Azerbaijani FK Karabakh and 6–1 against Bulgarian PFC Levski Sofia, FCK was going to face Chelsea F.C. After a dramatically 1–1 on Stamford Bridge, Chelsea won the second game at Parken - a goal scored by the Dane Brian Laudrup. On the post-match press conference, it was announced that Brian Laudrup was signing FCK from New Year, and FCK's Bjarne Goldbæk was signing Chelsea. After half a year in the club Laudrup switched to Ajax Amsterdam, where he stopped his career after a year.

Manager Kent Karlsson stopped in the middle of the autumn, and Kim Brink took over until New Year. At this point Christian Andersen took the manager-seat, but after just 30 controversial days he was fired and Brink was manager for the third time.

In the Superliga FCK could not win in Jutland, and began to draw their home matches. They ended 7th.

The next season was a fiasco in Europe. FCK lost the first round of the Intertoto Cup against a Polish team Polonia Warszawa. The Jutland-disaster continued, and they ended 8th in the table. FCK won a lot of home matches, amongst those a 7–2 victory against Vejle BK. The attendance at Parken rose, and for most games there was more than 10,000 visitors.

In the winter break Sibusiso Zuma was bought by the club.

=== 2000-2006: The new era ===
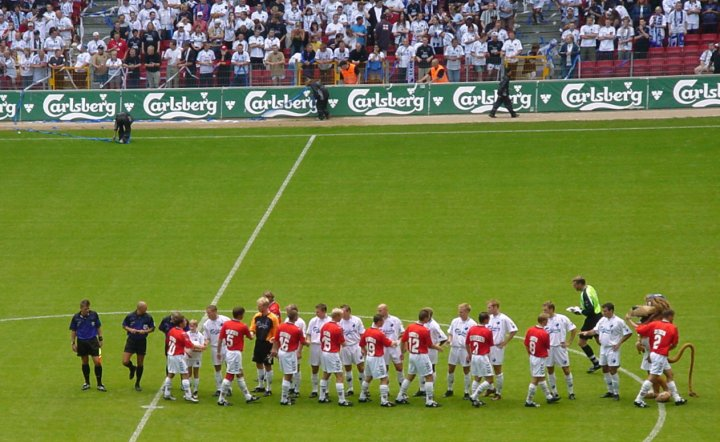
2001: FCK playing Vejle Boldklub in Parken.

From the 2000-01 season, English coach Roy Hodgson was hired. Things got off to a good start, where in the season's return fixture of the Copenhagen derby at Parken, FCK won 3-1. In that same match, from standing position Zuma received the ball from teammate Thomas Thorninger at chest height, lifting the ball with his chest, and in the same motion making the overhead kick, Zuma lobbed the ball into the far corner, out of reach of the Brøndby keeper, Mogens Krogh. That bicycle kick from Zuma was the goal that made the score 2-0. This culminated in the team winning their second Superliga championship.

In the next season there was finally some European success. In the Champions League qualification, FCK faced Georgian FC Torpedo Kutaisi who they defeated 4–2. The first leg of the Kutaisi game was the first game with new coach Hans Backe. He took over after Hodgson who broke his contract with FCK a few weeks after celebrating the championship signing the Italian side Udinese. Backe was to be to longest serving coach for FCK to this day. In third qualification round, Italian S.S. Lazio waited. FCK won the first game 2–1, but lost the second 1–4. Now FCK entered the UEFA Cup. Serbian FK Obilić whom they defeated 4–2, but in the next round Dutch Ajax Amsterdam was waiting. After a goalless match at Parken, FCK won at Amsterdam ArenA 1–0, after a goal by left back Niclas Jensen. In the third round Borussia Dortmund proved too big a hurdle for FCK. 0-1 defeats in both legs ended the European campaign for Byens Hold. The national competitions ended in bitter disappointment for FCK. Archrivals Brøndby won the championship on goal difference after FCK had caught up with Brøndbys 10 point lead in a half season. On top of that FCK lost in the cup final to OB, who had been sent home from Parken with 0–4 defeat a few weeks earlier. FCK qualified for the UEFA Cup.

2002-03 was not the best European season for FCK, in which they lost 3–1 to Swedish Djurgården. In the second last round in the Superliga, FCK faced Brøndby at Brøndby Stadium. In extra time, Hjalte Nørregaard scored his first goal for FCK. This was the goal which brought the championship back to Parken.

In the Champions League second qualifying round 2004-05 FCK won the first match against ND Gorica 2-1 but later lost, in a sensational defeat, at Parken with 0–5.

Since then, FCK has won two championships (2004 & 2006), and a cup title (2004). F.C. Copenhagen won the inaugural Royal League tournament in 2004-05, after tying IFK Göteborg in the final 1-1 and beating them in a penalty shootout, 12–11.
They won also the second season of the tournament, after this time winning against Lillestrøm S.K. in the final 1–0.

In the 2006–07 season, Byens Hold played in the Champions League qualifiers, with reinforcements as Jesper Grønkjær, Oscar Wendt and Fredrik Berglund ousting Dutch team Ajax Amsterdam. For the first time in the club's history FCK entered the group stage of the Champions League, being grouped with Celtic, Benfica and Manchester United. FCK has also won the Royal League, the Scandinavian championships, both seasons this two-year-old tournament has been played.

== See also ==
- The New Firm
