= 2009–10 Danish Superliga =

20th season of Danish Superliga

Danish Superliga
- Season: 2009–10
- Champions: FC Copenhagen
- Relegated: AGF; HB Køge
- Champions League: FC Copenhagen
- Europa League: OB; Brøndby IF; FC Nordsjælland (via Cup); Randers FC (via fair play)
- Matches: 198
- Goals: 515 (2.6 per match)
- Top goalscorer: Peter Utaka (18)
- Biggest home win: Copenhagen 7–1 Køge
- Biggest away win: Køge 0–5 AaB
- Highest scoring: Brøndby 6–3 Nordsjælland
- Longest winning run: 6 – FC København (22 Nov–21 Mar)
- Longest unbeaten run: 16 – Randers FC (29 Nov–9 May)
- Longest winless run: 17 – Randers FC (19 Jul–29 Nov)
- Longest losing run: 6 – HB Køge (21 Nov–21 Mar)
- Highest attendance: 30,191 – Copenhagen v Brøndby (14 Mar)
- Lowest attendance: 707 – Køge v Silkeborg (7 Mar)
- Average attendance: 8,315

The 2009–10 Danish Superliga season was the 20th season of the Danish Superliga league championship, which determinates the winners of the Danish football championship. It is governed by the Danish Football Association. The tournament started on 18 July 2009 and concluded on 16 May 2010.

The Danish champions qualify for 2010–11 UEFA Champions League qualification. Runners-up and 3rd placed team qualify for 2010–11 UEFA Europa League qualification. The 11th and 12th placed teams will be relegated to the 1st Division. The 1st Division champions and runners-up will be promoted to the Superliga.

On 5 May 2010, FC Copenhagen (FC København) won the title for the eighth time in 17 years after defeating HB Køge 4–0.

== Participants ==
Locations of the Danish Superliga 2009–10 teams

Club	Finishing position last season	First season in top division	First season of current spell in top division
AaB	7th	1928–29	1987
AGF	6th	1918–19	2007–08
Brøndby	3rd	1982	1982
Copenhagen	1st	1992–93	1992–93
Esbjerg	9th	1928–29	2001–02
HB Køge	1st in 1st Division	2009–10	2009–10
Midtjylland	4th	2000–01	2000–01
Nordsjælland	8th	2002–03	2002–03
OB	2nd	1927–28	1999–2000
Randers	5th	1941–42	2006–07
Silkeborg	2nd in 1st Division	1988	2009–10
SønderjyskE	10th	2000–01	2008–09

== League table ==
Pos	Team	Pld	W	D	L	GF	GA	GD	Pts	Qualification or relegation
1	Copenhagen (C)	33	21	5	7	61	22	+39	68	Qualification to Champions League third qualifying round
2	OB	33	17	8	8	46	34	+12	59	Qualification to Europa League third qualifying round
3	Brøndby	33	15	7	11	57	50	+7	52	Qualification to Europa League second qualifying round
4	Esbjerg fB	33	13	11	9	48	43	+5	50	
5	AaB	33	13	9	11	36	30	+6	48	
6	Midtjylland	33	14	5	14	45	48	−3	47	
7	Nordsjælland	33	12	7	14	40	41	−1	43	Qualification to Europa League third qualifying round (Note: FC Nordsjælland gained their Europa League-spot through winning the 2009–10 Danish Cup)
8	Silkeborg IF	33	12	7	14	47	51	−4	43	
9	SønderjyskE	33	11	8	14	32	37	−5	41	
10	Randers FC	33	10	10	13	37	43	−6	40	Qualification to Europa League first qualifying round (Note: Randers FC gained their Europa League-spot through the fair play competition.)
11	AGF (R)	33	10	8	15	36	47	−11	38	Relegation to Danish 1st Division
12	HB Køge (R)	33	4	7	22	30	69	−39	19	Relegation to Danish 1st Division

Source: Danish Football Association (in Danish)
Rules for classification: 1) points; 2) goal difference; 3) number of goals scored.
(C) Champions; (R) Relegated

== Results ==
=== Matchday 1–11 ===
Home \ Away	AaB	AGF	BIF	EfB	FCK	FCM	FCN	HBK	OB	RFC	SIF	SJE
AaB					1–2	1–0	1–0				0–1	1–0
AGF	1–0					2–4		2–1	2–2		2–2	2–1
Brøndby	0–2	1–0				3–1	6–3	6–1	2–2			
Esbjerg fB	2–0	3–2	2–1					3–2	1–2			
Copenhagen		0–1	1–1	2–1				7–1		3–0	1–1	
Midtjylland				0–0	1–4		0–2	2–1		4–1		0–2
Nordsjælland		0–2		0–4	2–0					2–2	3–0	
HB Køge	0–5						1–1		1–3		1–1	1–0
OB	2–1				1–1	1–0	2–0			1–0		3–1
Randers FC	0–3	2–3	1–3	0–1				1–1			1–2	
Silkeborg IF			4–1	2–3		4–0			3–1			1–1
SønderjyskE			2–4	1–1	0–1		1–0			1–0		

Source: Danish Football Association (in Danish)
Legend: Blue = home team win; Yellow = draw; Red = away team win.

=== Matchday 12–33 ===
Home \ Away	AaB	AGF	BIF	EfB	FCK	FCM	FCN	HBK	OB	RFC	SIF	SJE
AaB		0–0	1–2	0–0	1–0	3–2	2–1	0–0	1–0	1–1	1–0	1–1
AGF	0–2		1–0	1–1	0–0	2–2	0–2	0–3	0–3	0–0	1–2	1–2
Brøndby	2–0	1–0		2–4	0–2	1–1	0–1	1–3	1–3	1–1	2–2	1–1
Esbjerg fB	1–1	0–4	1–1		0–0	2–1	3–3	2–1	1–2	0–0	4–0	2–0
Copenhagen	2–0	5–0	2–0	3–2		2–0	0–2	4–0	2–0	2–0	1–0	3–1
Midtjylland	2–0	1–0	2–4	3–0	3–2		1–0	2–1	2–2	2–1	3–0	0–0
Nordsjælland	1–1	0–1	0–1	1–0	0–3	3–0		1–1	0–2	1–1	0–1	3–1
HB Køge	0–3	1–1	1–2	1–2	0–2	1–0	1–2		1–2	1–2	1–4	1–2
OB	1–1	2–0	0–1	0–0	0–2	1–2	2–1	1–0		1–3	1–0	1–1
Randers FC	3–1	2–1	1–3	4–0	1–0	2–0	0–0	2–1	1–1		0–2	0–0
Silkeborg IF	1–1	1–4	3–0	2–2	2–0	0–2	1–4	3–0	0–1	1–3		1–2
SønderjyskE	2–0	1–0	1–3	1–0	0–2	0–2	0–1	0–0	2–0	0–1	4–0	

Source: Danish Football Association (in Danish)
Legend: Blue = home team win; Yellow = draw; Red = away team win.

== Goals ==
Source: DBU (in Danish)

=== Top goalscorers ===
Pos	Player	Club	Goals
1	(Nigeria) Peter Utaka	OB	18
2	(Netherlands) Tim Janssen	Esbjerg fB	15
3	(Senegal) Dame N'Doye	F.C. Copenhagen	14
4	(Denmark) Rajko Lekic	Silkeborg IF	13
5	(Denmark) Morten "Duncan" Rasmussen	Brøndby IF	12
6	(Faroe Islands) Christian Holst	Silkeborg IF	11
6	(Brazil) César Santin	FC Copenhagen	11
8	(Denmark) Mikkel Beckmann	Randers FC	10
8	(Denmark) Kenneth Fabricius	SønderjyskE	10
10	(Denmark) Frank Kristensen	FC Midtjylland	9

=== Own goals ===
- Allan K. Jepsen (Randers) for Brøndby (17 August 2009)
- Jim Larsen (Silkeborg) for AGF (22 August 2009)
- Nicklas Svendsen (HB Køge) for Odense (20 September 2009)
- Nicklas Svendsen (HB Køge) for Odense (20 September 2009)
- Mikkel Vendelbo (Esbjerg) for AGF (28 September 2009)
- Anders Egholm (SønderjyskE) for AGF (3 October 2009)
- Nenad Novaković (Nordsjælland) for Brøndby (4 October 2009)
- Winston Reid (Midtjylland) for AGF (31 October 2009)
- Jens Gjesing (AGF) for Midtjylland (31 October 2009)
- Jens Gjesing (AGF) for HB Køge (7 November 2009)
- Jim Larsen (Silkeborg) for Odense (7 November 2009)
- Kevin Conboy (Esbjerg) for Brøndby (8 November 2009)
- Kian Hansen (Esbjerg) for Nordsjælland (21 March 2010)
- Anders Østli (SønderjyskE) for Copenhagen (21 March 2010)
- Kasper Bøgelund (AaB) for Randers FC (5 May 2010)
- Jakob Poulsen (AGF) for SønderjyskE (6 May 2010)
- Mikkel Bischoff (Brøndby IF) for Randers FC (16 May 2010)

=== Hat-tricks ===
Scorer	Game	Date
(Denmark) Rajko Lekic	Silkeborg v Midtjylland	26 July 2009
(Denmark) Morten "Duncan" Rasmussen	Brøndby v Nordsjælland	4 October 2009
(Brazil) César Santin	Copenhagen v AGF	7 March 2010
(Faroe Islands) Christian Holst	Silkeborg v HB Køge	28 March 2010
(Netherlands) Tim Janssen	Esbjerg v Silkeborg	6 May 2010

== Season statistics ==
=== Scoring ===
- First goal of the season: Stephan Petersen for Nordsjælland against Copenhagen (18 July 2009)
- Fastest goal in a match: Peter Graulund (16 seconds) for AGF against AaB (20 July 2009)
- Widest Winning Margin: Copenhagen 7–1 HB Køge (25 July 2009)
- Most Goals in a Match: Brøndby 6–3 Nordsjælland (4 October 2009)
- First hat-trick of the season: Rajko Lekic for Silkeborg against Midtjylland (26 July 2009)

=== Cards ===
- First yellow card: Benjamin Kibebe for Nordsjælland against Copenhagen (18 July 2009)
- First red card: Tim Janssen for Esbjerg against Brøndby (26 July 2009)
- Fastest red card in a match: Johan Absalonsen (55 minutes) for OB against AGF (3 August 2009)

=== Attendances ===
Source: DanskFodbold.com (in Danish)

Team	Average	Highest	Lowest
Copenhagen	19,338	30,191	12,046
Brøndby	14,372	22,795	9,349
AGF	11,879	19,210	7,038
Esbjerg	9,052	15,316	5,306
OB	8,670	14,569	4,553
AaB	7,517	10,561	4,851
Midtjylland	7,107	9,869	5,487
Randers	5,977	11,824	2,649
Silkeborg	4,656	8,340	2,552
Nordsjælland	4,636	7,609	2,787
SønderjyskE	3,419	5,852	1,554
HB Køge	2,068	5,079	707

== Venues ==
The Danish Football Association has listed a number of requirements to the venues hosting Superliga football. These include a minimum capacity of 10,000, hereof at least 3,000 seats. Further is under-soil heating a demand. It is possible for a club to get dispensation for some of the requirements for a year, after promotion to the league.

Team	Stadium	Town	Capacity	Notes
F.C. Copenhagen	Parken Stadium	Copenhagen	38,065	All-seater
Brøndby IF	Brøndby Stadium	Brøndbyvester	29,000	23,400 seats
AGF	NRGi Park	Aarhus	21,000	All-seater
Esbjerg fB	Blue Water Arena	Esbjerg	18,000	11,451 seats
OB	Fionia Park	Odense	15,790	13,990 seats
AaB	Energi Nord Arena	Aalborg	13,797	8,997 seats
Randers FC	Essex Park Randers	Randers	12,000	6,114 seats
FC Midtjylland	MCH Arena	Herning	11,809	7,409 seats
FC Nordsjælland	Farum Park	Farum	10,100	9,800 seats. No under-soil heating.
Silkeborg IF	Silkeborg Stadion	Silkeborg	10,000	5,500 seats. No under-soil heating.
SønderjyskE	Haderslev Fodboldstadion	Haderslev	10,000	1,650 seats.
HB Køge	SEAS-NVE Park	Herfølge	8,000	3,400 seats. No under-soil heating. Alternative venue is Køge Stadion.

== Managerial changes ==
Team	Outgoing manager	Manner of departure	Date of vacancy	Replaced by	Date of appointment	Position in table
SønderjyskE	(Denmark) Carsten Broe	Resigned	6 June 2009	(Denmark) Michael Hemmingsen	Unknown	Pre-season
FC Midtjylland	(Denmark) Thomas Thomasberg	Sacked	11 August 2009	(Denmark) Allan Kuhn	12 August 2009	9th
Randers FC	(Denmark) John Jensen	Sacked	6 October 2009	(Denmark) Ove Christensen	7 October 2009	12th
Brøndby IF	(Denmark) Kent Nielsen	Sacked	25 March 2010	(Denmark) Henrik Jensen	26 March 2010	7th

- ^1 Did not become official until date he gained his P-licence. Frank Andersen briefly served as interim manager.

== See also ==
- 2009–10 in Danish football
