= 2006–07 Danish Superliga =

17th season of Danish Superliga

SAS Ligaen
- Season: 2006–07
- Champions: F.C. Copenhagen
- Relegated: Vejle BK; Silkeborg IF

The 2006–07 Danish Superliga season was the 17th season of the Danish Superliga league championship, which determined the winners of the Danish football championship. It was governed by the Danish Football Association. It took place from the first match on July 19, 2006 to the final match on May 27, 2007. The ending date was discussed to be postponed to mid-June, if the Danish under-21 national team missed qualification for the UEFA U-21 Championship 2007, as they did, but instead the date was moved from Pentecost Monday to Pentecost Sunday.

The Danish champions qualified for UEFA Champions League 2007–08 qualification. The runners-up qualified for UEFA Cup 2007–08 qualification. The third-place finishers qualified for the UEFA Intertoto Cup 2007. The 11th and 12th placed teams were relegated to the 1st Division. The 1st Division champions and runners-up are promoted to the Superliga.

The fixture schedule can be seen here.

== Participants ==
Club	Finishing position last season	First season in top division	First season of current spell in top division
Aalborg BK	5th	1928–29	1987
AC Horsens	10th	1929–30	2005–06
Brøndby IF	2nd	1982	1982
Esbjerg fB	6th	1928–29	2001–02
F.C. Copenhagen	1st	1992–93	1992–93
FC Midtjylland	7th	2000–01	2000–01
FC Nordsjælland	9th	2002–03	2002–03
Odense BK	3rd	1927–28	1999-00
Randers FC	2nd in 1st Division	1941–42	2006–07
Silkeborg IF	8th	1988	2004–05
Vejle BK	1st in 1st Division	1940–41	2006–07
Viborg FF	4th	1927–28	1998–99

== League standings ==
Pos	Team	Pld	W	D	L	GF	GA	GD	Pts	Qualification or relegation
1	Copenhagen (C)	33	23	7	3	60	23	+37	76	Qualification to Champions League second qualifying round
2	Midtjylland	33	18	9	6	58	39	+19	63	Qualification to UEFA Cup first qualifying round
3	AaB	33	18	7	8	55	35	+20	61	Qualification to Intertoto Cup second round
4	OB	33	17	7	9	45	36	+9	58	Qualification to UEFA Cup first qualifying round (Note: OB qualified for UEFA Cup first qualifying round by winning the 2006–07 Danish Cup.)
5	Nordsjælland	33	16	9	8	68	40	+28	57	
6	Brøndby IF	33	13	10	10	50	38	+12	49	
7	Esbjerg fB (Note: The April 26, 2007 match between Esbjerg and Silkeborg had the original scoreline of 1–2 altered by the Danish Football Association. Due to the use of ineligible player Jesper Lange, Esbjerg had one goal deducted and Silkeborg one added, changing the scoreline to 0–3.)	33	10	10	13	46	51	−5	40	
8	Randers	33	10	8	15	41	53	−12	38	
9	Viborg	33	8	5	20	34	64	−30	29	
10	Horsens	33	6	10	17	29	53	−24	28	
11	Vejle (R)	33	6	7	20	35	64	−29	25	Relegation to Danish 1st Division
12	Silkeborg IF (R)	33	5	7	21	34	60	−26	22	Relegation to Danish 1st Division

Rules for classification: 1) points; 2) goal difference; 3) number of goals scored.
(C) Champions; (R) Relegated

== Results ==
To read this table, the home team is listed in the left-hand column.

Home \ Away	ACH	BIF	EFB	FCK	FCM	FCN	OB	RFC	SIF	VBK	VFF	AAB	ACH	BIF	EFB	FCK	FCM	FCN	OB	RFC	SIF	VBK	VFF	AAB
AC Horsens		0–0	1–1	0–1	2–2	2–3	0–2	2–1	2–1	1–2	2–2	0–0			1–1	1–3			1–2				3–1	1–4
Brøndby IF	3–0		2–0	0–1	1–3	2–1	1–0	3–0	1–1	2–1	3–0	1–2	2–0		2–1			2–0			3–1	4–0	3–1	
Esbjerg fB	0–1	1–1		2–2	4–2	3–5	1–2	3–1	2–1	3–3	2–2	1–2				0–0	3–0	1–0			0–3	1–0		0–2
FC Copenhagen	3–1	1–0	1–2		2–1	1–0	1–1	2–1	3–1	3–0	3–0	0–2		3–1			2–2	1–1	4–2	1–0				1–2
FC Midtjylland	1–2	1–1	3–1	1–4		2–2	3–0	2–1	3–1	2–2	3–1	1–0	1–0	1–1				1–1		2–1				2–1
FC Nordsjælland	0–0	3–3	1–1	0–1	1–4		2–1	5–0	1–0	1–0	2–0	1–1	4–0							4–2	5–1	3–0	4–1	
Odense BK	2–0	2–2	0–2	0–0	1–1	2–1		1–1	2–0	3–2	2–0	1–1		1–0	0–0		1–0	0–1		1–2			2–3	
Randers FC	1–0	1–1	3–1	0–2	0–0	1–6	1–2		0–0	2–1	3–2	1–1	2–1	2–0	3–2						1–1	0–1		
Silkeborg IF	0–2	2–1	1–2	1–4	0–2	1–1	0–1	0–0		1–1	1–2	0–2	1–1			0–1	0–1		1–3					4–6
Vejle BK	2–2	3–0	3–0	0–4	2–5	3–2	1–3	0–2	2–4		2–0	1–1	0–0			0–0	1–2		1–2		0–2			
Viborg FF	1–0	1–1	0–4	1–3	0–1	1–2	0–2	3–2	2–3	1–0		0–2			1–1	0–1	0–1			1–1	2–1	2–1		
AaB	4–0	1–1	2–0	0–1	0–2	0–3	0–1	2–1	1–0	4–0	3–1			3–2				1–1	3–1	0–4		2–0	0–2	

Source: Danskfodbold.com

== Top goalscorers ==
Pos	Player	Club	Goals
1	(Sweden) Rade Prica	Aalborg BK	19
2	(Denmark) Morten Nordstrand	FC Nordsjælland	18
3	(Denmark) Morten Rasmussen	Brøndby IF	15
4	(Senegal) Baye Djiby Fall	Randers FC	13
5	(Denmark) Frank Kristensen	FC Midtjylland	12
5	(Brazil) Gilberto Macena	AC Horsens	12
7	(Sweden) Marcus Allbäck	F.C. Copenhagen	11
7	(Denmark) Jesper Bech	Esbjerg fB	11
7	(Denmark) Christian Olsen	FC Midtjylland	11
7	(Denmark) Dennis Sørensen	FC Midtjylland	11

== Attendances ==
No.	Club	Average	Highest
1	FC København	23,792	40,463
2	Brøndby IF	13,944	25,083
3	FC Midtjylland	8,717	11,488
4	AaB	8,611	13,882
5	OB	7,893	13,670
6	Esbjerg fB	6,835	13,487
7	Randers FC	6,524	9,652
8	Vejle BK	4,478	8,104
9	Viborg FF	4,427	5,863
10	FC Nordsjælland	3,859	8,922
11	AC Horsens	3,693	5,525
12	Silkeborg IF	3,424	5,832

== See also ==
- 2006-07 in Danish football
