= Ståle Solbakken =

Norwegian footballer and manager (born 1968)

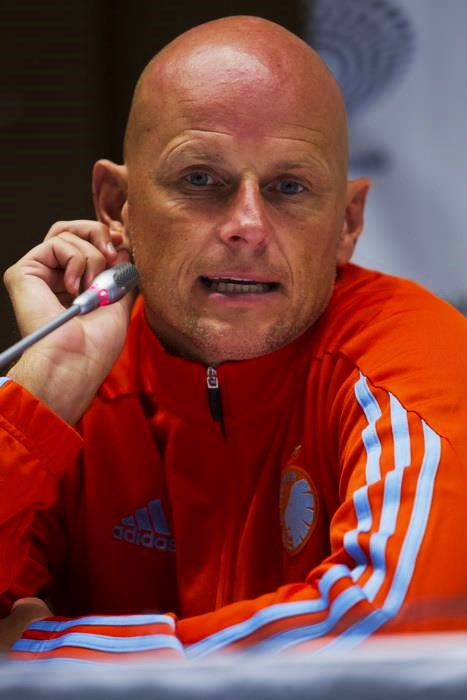
- Solbakken as manager of Copenhagen in 2014

Personal information
- Full name: Ståle Solbakken
- Date of birth: 27 February 1968 (age 58)
- Place of birth: Kongsvinger, Norway
- Height: 1.90 m (6 ft 3 in)
- Position: Midfielder

Team information
- Current team: Norway (head coach)

Youth career
- –1989: Grue

Senior career*
| Years | Team | Apps | (Gls) |
| 1989–1994 | Hamarkameratene | 100 | (35) |
| 1994–1997 | Lillestrøm | 99 | (34) |
| 1997–1998 | Wimbledon | 6 | (1) |
| 1998–2000 | AaB | 79 | (13) |
| 2000–2001 | Copenhagen | 14 | (4) |
| Total | | 298 | (87) |

International career
| 1992 | Norway U21 | 2 | (0) |
| 1994–2000 | Norway | 58 | (9) |

Managerial career
- 2002–2005: Hamarkameratene
- 2006–2011: Copenhagen
- 2011–2012: 1. FC Köln
- 2012–2013: Wolverhampton Wanderers
- 2013–2020: Copenhagen
- 2020–: Norway
- * Club domestic league appearances and goals

Ståle Solbakken (born 27 February 1968) is a Norwegian professional football manager and former player who is the head coach of the Norway national team. He is the first manager to take Norway to the FIFA World Cup since Egil Olsen in 1998.

During his playing career, Solbakken was named 1995 Norwegian Midfielder of the Year and won the Danish Superliga championship with both Aalborg and Copenhagen (in 1999 and 2001, respectively). He played 58 matches and scored nine goals for Norway during the end of the 1990s and represented the country at the 1998 World Cup and 2000 European Championship tournaments. He ended his playing career in March 2001 following a heart attack.

As a manager, Solbakken was named 2004 Norwegian Manager of the Year and won eight Superliga championships with Copenhagen. He was also in charge of German club 1. FC Köln during the 2011–12 Bundesliga season and then managed the English side Wolverhampton Wanderers in a six-month tenure. Following his second period at Copenhagen, he was appointed coach of the Norwegian national team in 2020 and, in 2025, qualified them for their first World Cup since 1998, winning all eight of their qualifying group games.

Solbakken led Norway to the quarter-finals of the 2026 FIFA World Cup in North America, the country's best-ever World Cup result. Norway beat Côte d'Ivoire 2–1 in the round of 32 and five-time world champions Brazil 2–1 in the round of 16, before losing 2–1 after extra time to England in the quarter-finals. In December 2025, Solbakken extended his contract with the Norwegian Football Federation to run until Euro 2028.

== Club career ==
=== Early clubs ===
Solbakken, a midfielder, started his career in Norway, playing for his local lower league team Grue. After five seasons with Grue, he moved to HamKam, a then-second tier club, in 1989.

He was the club's top goalscorer in the 1990 season, where he netted nine times. The following season he scored 14 goals to help the club to promotion to the top-flight Norwegian Premier League. After narrowly avoiding relegation in his first season at the top level, Solbakken was part of the HamKam side that finished fifth in 1993 – a position they have not bettered since.

=== Lillestrøm ===
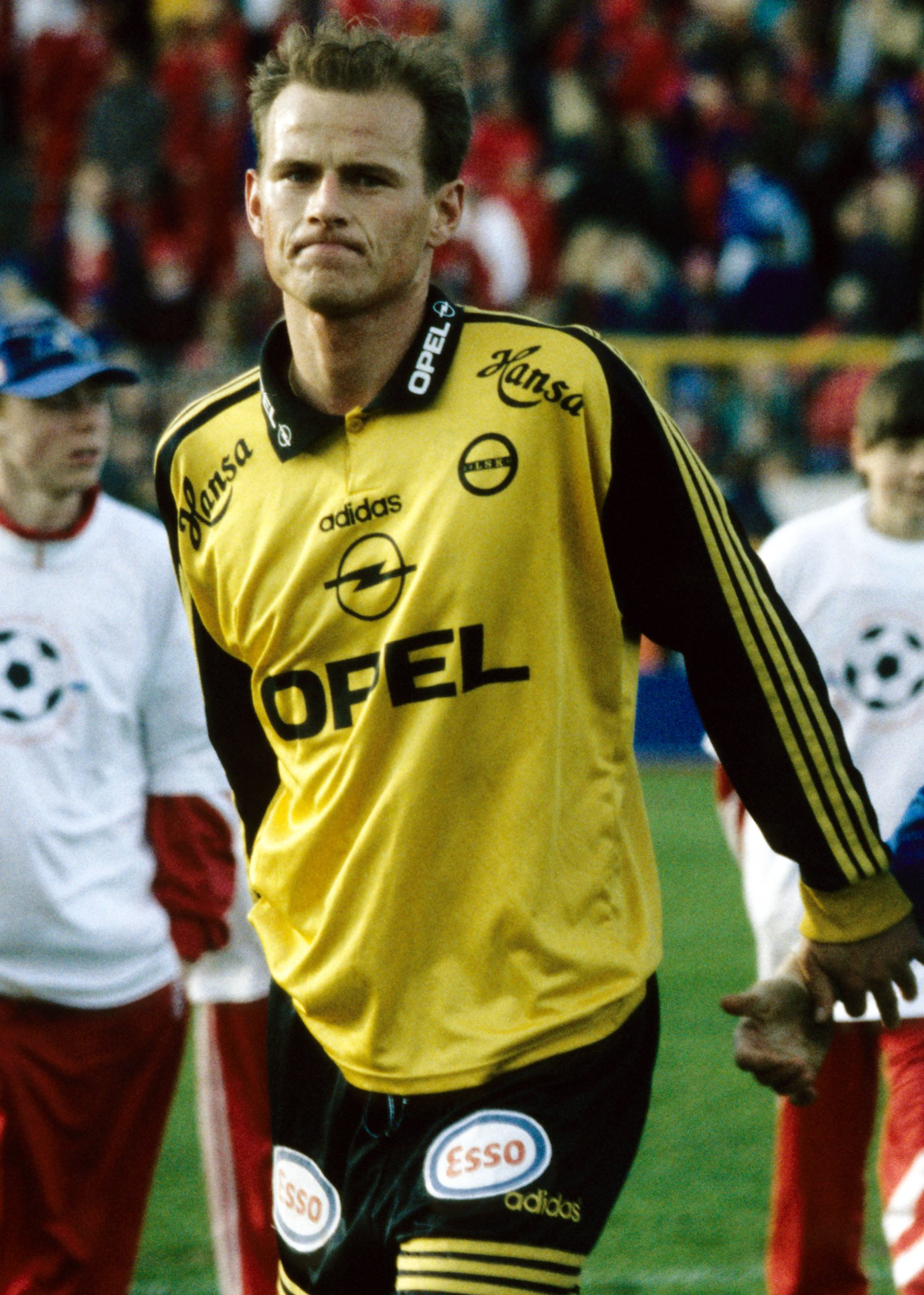
Solbakken playing for Lillestrøm in 1996

In 1994, he transferred to their Premier League rivals Lillestrøm where he finished as runner-up in the league during his first season. Although the club finished in fourth during the following campaign, Solbakken's performances saw him win the Kniksen award as the Norwegian Midfielder of the Season.

He was appointed club captain by Lillestrøm and helped the side again finish runners-up in 1996 before he serving one final season in 1997 for the Canaries. In total, he made 99 league appearances for the club, scoring 34 times.

=== Moves abroad ===
In October 1997, Solbakken joined English Premier League club Wimbledon for £250,000. In his six league games for Wimbledon, Solbakken scored one goal against West Ham United and was twice named "man of the match", but he fell out with team manager Joe Kinnear and was banned from club training shortly thereafter.

Solbakken was quickly sold to Danish side Aalborg in March 1998. He became Aalborg's captain and guided the club to the 1998–99 Danish Superliga championship as well as the final of the 1998–99 Danish Cup tournament. He won Danish football's Player of the Year Award in 2000. In total, he played 79 games and scored 13 goals for AaB in the Danish Superliga.

In August 2000, Solbakken departed to Danish league rivals Copenhagen. He quickly became a regular player in the side and helped push them to the top of the table but he was unable to complete the season after suffering a heart attack in March 2001. The club went on to win the 2001 Superliga championship and give Solbakken a second championship medal as a player.

=== Health problems ===
During training on 13 March 2001, Solbakken had a heart attack. He was rapidly attended to by the club doctor, Frank Odgaard, who found that Solbakken's heart had stopped beating. Odgaard asked a player to call an ambulance and to tell them it was critical, while he continued to administer cardiac massage. Upon the ambulance's arrival, Solbakken was pronounced clinically dead at the scene. On the way to the hospital in the ambulance, he was revived nearly seven minutes later.

He survived the episode and now has a pacemaker fitted. The heart attack was the result of a previously undetected heart defect. Shortly after, on medical advice, Solbakken announced his retirement from playing.

== International career ==
Solbakken made his international debut for the Norway national team on 9 March 1994 in a 3–1 friendly win in Wales. Although he was not named in the squad for the 1994 World Cup, he became a regular feature in the squad soon after.

He was a member of the Norwegian team that qualified for 1998 World Cup, where he appeared in two of their group games (against Morocco and Scotland) as well as their second round exit to Italy.

His country qualified for the next major tournament, the 2000 European Championship, but Solbakken picked up an injury shortly before the finals. In the end, he was only able to appear in one tournament game: a goalless draw with Slovenia that eliminated them in the group stage. After this exit, he announced his international retirement, aged 32.

In total, Solbakken earned 58 caps for Norway, scoring nine times.

=== International goals ===
Scores and goals list Norway's goal tally first

| No. | Date | Opponent | Score | Result | Venue | Competition |
|---|---|---|---|---|---|---|
| 1. | 2 June 1996 | Azerbaijan | 1–0 | 5–0 | Ullevaal, Oslo | 1998 World Cup qualifier |
| 2. | 2 June 1996 | Azerbaijan | 3–0 | 5–0 | Ullevaal, Oslo | 1998 World Cup qualifier |
| 3. | 1 September 1996 | Georgia | 1–0 | 1–0 | Ullevaal, Oslo | Friendly |
| 4. | 29 March 1997 | United Arab Emirates | 4–1 | 4–1 | Sharjah Stadium, Sharjah | Friendly |
| 5. | 20 August 1997 | Finland | 1–0 | 4–0 | Olympic Stadium, Helsinki | 1998 World Cup qualifier |
| 6. | 10 September 1997 | Switzerland | 2–0 | 5–0 | Ullevaal, Oslo | 1998 World Cup qualifier |
| 7. | 6 September 1998 | Latvia | 1–1 | 1–3 | Ullevaal, Oslo | Euro 2000 qualifier |
| 8. | 22 January 1999 | Estonia | 1–0 | 3–3 | Municipal Stadium, Umm al-Fahm | Friendly |
| 9. | 29 March 2000 | Switzerland | 1–0 | 2–2 | Cornaredo Stadium, Lugano | Friendly |

== Managerial career ==
=== Ham-Kam ===
In 2002, Solbakken returned to Norway and started his managerial career at his old club HamKam, positioned at the second tier. He had great success at HamKam, as the club won the league and was promoted to the top-flight Tippeligaen. His "resurrection", and the "salvation" (i.e. promotion) of HamKam, earned him the nickname "Ståle Salvatore", often cited in Norwegian press since.

The next season, Solbakken managed HamKam to a fifth place in the Tippeligaen 2004 season, and he won the 2004 Kniksen award as Norwegian Manager of the Year. In late 2005, Solbakken was named as new manager of another of his former clubs, Copenhagen.

=== Copenhagen ===
In his first years at the club, Solbakken guided Copenhagen to the 2006 and 2007 Danish Superliga championship, as well as the 2006 Royal League trophy. He managed Copenhagen through to the group stage of the 2006–07 UEFA Champions League, after beating Ajax in the final qualifying round on 23 August 2006. Copenhagen finished last in its group, though they won a meriting 1–0 victory against later semi-finalists Manchester United.

In May 2009, Solbakken led Copenhagen to the Double of both the 2009 Danish Cup and the 2009 Superliga championship, the seventh championship in club history. On 3 November 2009, it was announced that he would not renew his contract which ended on 30 June 2011. Instead, he agreed a letter of intent to become Norway national team manager either in January 2012 or after the Euro 2012, should Norway qualify. However, this agreement was ultimately not to come to fruition.

=== 1. FC Köln ===
On 15 May 2011, it was announced that Solbakken would take over as manager of 1. FC Köln of the German Bundesliga from sporting director Volker Finke, who acted as interim manager after Frank Schaefer quit during the season. Solbakken had been due to take the Norway national team job in January 2012, but Köln bought out his contract for a reported €400,000.

He won his first game in charge, a DFB Cup tie at SC Wiedenbrück, but took four league games to register his first victory. By the winter break Köln sat in tenth place, but their form plummeted in the second half of the campaign and they dropped into a relegation battle. This decline in form was coupled with several negative incidents involving their squad misbehaving off the field. Solbakken later quipped that "Jesus and José Mourinho would have struggled together at that club this year".

Solbakken was dismissed by Köln on 12 April 2012 following a 0–4 loss at Mainz, with the team sat in 16th place. He was replaced by former coach Frank Schaefer, who oversaw the final four games of the season, during which the club dropped to 17th place and were therefore relegated.

=== Wolverhampton Wanderers ===
On 11 May 2012, English club Wolverhampton Wanderers announced that Solbakken was to become their new manager. He officially took over from acting manager Terry Connor on 1 July 2012. Solbakken began his Wolves tenure with the club in the Football League Championship having been relegated from the English Premier League at the end of the 2011–12 season. His first competitive game in charge was a League Cup tie against Aldershot Town, which his side won on penalties.

Solbakken failed to stop the club's slump that had brought relegation and despite at one time lifting the club to third place, they had slumped as low as 18th by the turn of the year. He was sacked on 5 January 2013, following an FA Cup elimination by at that time non-league Luton Town, which was his fourth consecutive defeat.

=== Return to Copenhagen ===
On 21 August 2013, Solbakken returned as head coach of Copenhagen, two years after his departure.

Solbakken had a seven-year reign at Copenhagen in which he won three championships in 2016, 2017 and 2019. However, due to a bad start to the 2020–21 Danish Superliga, poor domestic results during 2020 and a failure to qualify for the 2020–21 UEFA Europa League group stage, Solbakken was fired as manager on 10 October 2020.

For his two tenures at Copenhagen, Solbakken was awarded the title as the 'Biggest Manager in Superliga History' by a jury of 38 experts on the Danish Superliga including former Danish national coach Morten Olsen and former football player Rasmus Würtz, who is accredited with most Superliga games played to date with 452 caps.

=== Norway national team ===
On 3 December 2020, Solbakken became the Norway international manager on a four-year deal, after the resignation of Lars Lagerbäck. In his first match the following 24 March, the side won 3–0 away to Gibraltar in 2022 FIFA World Cup qualification. Norway failed to qualify, and Solbakken criticised the decision to host the tournament in Qatar due to human rights issues and the manner of the vote; the Norwegian Football Federation sent only one representative, an analyst to monitor the team's next opponents, Spain.

In the 2026 FIFA World Cup qualification campaign, Solbakken led Norway to qualification for the tournament, finishing top of their group ahead of Italy and securing qualification with a 4–1 away victory over the latter in their final match. During the tournament, Norway reached the quarter-finals for the first time in their history after a 2–1 victory over Brazil in the round of 16. Their run ended in the quarter-finals with a 2–1 defeat to England after extra time.

== Personal life ==
His son Markus Solbakken is a footballer, who made his debut for the Norwegian national team under his father's management in 2023.

== Managerial statistics ==
As of match played 17 November 2026

Managerial record by team and tenure
| Team | Nat. | From | To | Record | | | | | Ref. |
| Team | Nat. | From | To | G | W | D | L | Win % | Ref. |
|---|---|---|---|---|---|---|---|---|---|
| HamKam | (Norway) | 26 November 2002 | 31 December 2005 | 82 | 37 | 21 | 24 | 45.12 | |
| Copenhagen | (Denmark) | 1 January 2006 | 15 May 2011 | 252 | 153 | 47 | 52 | 60.71 | |
| 1. FC Köln | (Germany) | 15 May 2011 | 12 April 2012 | 32 | 9 | 5 | 18 | 28.13 | |
| Wolverhampton Wanderers | (England) | 1 July 2012 | 5 January 2013 | 30 | 10 | 5 | 15 | 33.33 | |
| Copenhagen | (Denmark) | 21 August 2013 | 10 October 2020 | 357 | 203 | 77 | 77 | 56.86 | |
| Norway | (Norway) | 7 December 2020 | Present | 68 | 39 | 12 | 17 | 57.35 | |
| Career Total | | | | 821 | 451 | 167 | 203 | 54.93 | |

== Honours ==
=== Player ===
AaB

- Danish Superliga: 1998–99

Copenhagen

- Danish Superliga: 2000–01

=== Manager ===
Copenhagen

- Royal League: 2005–06
- Danish Superliga: 2005–06, 2006–07, 2008–09, 2009–10, 2010–11, 2015–16, 2016–17, 2018–19
- Danish Cup: 2008–09, 2014–15, 2015–16, 2016–17

=== Individual ===
- 1995 Kniksen award as Norwegian Midfielder of the Year
- 2004 Kniksen award as Norwegian Manager of the Year
- Danish Superliga Manager of the Year: 2007, 2011
