= Mikkel Bischoff =

Danish footballer (born 1982)

Personal information
- Full name: Mikkel Rufus Mutahi Bischoff
- Date of birth: 3 February 1982 (age 44)
- Place of birth: Copenhagen, Denmark
- Height: 1.93 m (6 ft 4 in)
- Position: Centre-back

Youth career
- KB
- Fremad Amager
- AB

Senior career*
Years	Team	Apps	(Gls)
2001–2002	AB	10	(0)
2002–2006	Manchester City	1	(0)
2004–2005	→ Wolverhampton Wanderers (loan)	11	(1)
2006	→ Sheffield Wednesday (loan)	4	(0)
2006–2007	Coventry City	3	(0)
2007–2011	Brøndby	54	(1)
2011	Lyngby	0	(0)
Total		83	(2)

International career
2002–2003	Denmark U21	4	(0)
- * Club domestic league appearances and goals

Mikkel Rufus Mutahi Bischoff (born 3 February 1982) is a Danish football pundit and former professional player who played as a centre-back. Having started his senior career with AB in 2001, he joined Manchester City a year later. For Manchester City, he only made two appearances in four years and was loaned out to Wolverhampton Wanderers and Sheffield Wednesday. After leaving Manchester City, he spent half a season at Coventry City before returning to Denmark with Brøndby where he remained for a few years. He ended his career with Lyngby in 2011. He also played four games for the Denmark under-21 national team.

== Career ==
Born in Copenhagen, Bischoff made his senior debut with Danish club Akademisk Boldklub, where he made just eleven Danish league appearances. On 15 May 2002, he moved abroad to join English club Manchester City for a fee of £750,000. He was the fourth Dane to sign for Manchester City in less than a year, with Peter Schmeichel, Niclas Jensen and Kevin Stuhr Ellegaard at City already. Signing Bischoff was part of a move to strengthen the team's prospects for the future, and he made his debut for the Danish under-21 national team upon his arrival at City. After making his one and only league appearance for City against Blackburn Rovers in September 2002, he underwent a hernia operation, and was unable to make an impression for the club. He was under the knife again in the summer of 2003 after picking up a foot injury playing for the Denmark under-21 side.

Things did not get much better for Bischoff during the 2003–04 season. He returned for just one game – making an appearance in the starting lineup for the second-leg UEFA Cup win over League of Wales club The New Saints in August. Bischoff returned to the reserves.

At the end of September 2004, Bischoff joined Championship side Wolverhampton Wanderers on a month-long loan deal, in order to gain some valuable first team experience. After impressing in seven appearances and a goal against Nottingham Forest, he remained at Molineux as he signed a season-long loan deal with the club on the last day of the transfer window.

Bischoff returned to Manchester City at the end of the season, but after another half-year as a substitute, he signed a loan deal with Sheffield Wednesday in March 2006 and made his "Owls" debut against QPR the following day. In spite of suffering a small injury, Bischoff played his part in helping Wednesday avoid relegation from the Football League Championship. At the end of the season, he was released by Manchester City, along with nine teammates, following the expiration of his contract. He went on to sign for Coventry City several weeks later, in June 2006. After three games in seven months, Bischoff moved back to Denmark on a free transfer in the January 2007 transfer window, in order to play for Brøndby IF. He played regularly during his first couple of seasons at the club, before retiring at age 30 on 10 August 2012.

== Personal life ==
Bischoff was born in Denmark to a Kenyan father and Danish mother. His daughter, Mila Bischoff, is also a footballer, currently playing for Brøndby IF. His nephew, Clement Bischoff, is also a professional footballer.

== Career statistics ==
Appearances and goals by club, season and competition
Club	Season	League			National cup		League cup		Europe		Others		Total		Ref.
Club	Season	Division	Apps	Goals	Apps	Goals	Apps	Goals	Apps	Goals	Apps	Goals	Apps	Goals	Ref.
AB	2001–02	Danish Superliga	10	0			–		0	0	0	0	10	0	
Manchester City	2002–03	Premier League	1	0	0	0	0	0	0	0	0	0	1	0	
Manchester City	2003–04	Premier League	0	0	0	0	0	0	1	0	0	0	1	0	
Manchester City	Total		1	0	0	0	0	0	1	0	0	0	2	0	–
Wolverhampton Wanderers (loan)	2004–05	Championship	11	1	0	0	0	0	0	0	0	0	11	1	
Sheffield Wednesday (loan)	2005–06	Championship	4	0	0	0	0	0	0	0	0	0	4	0	
Coventry City	2006–07	Championship	3	0	0	0	0	0	0	0	0	0	3	0	
Brøndby IF	2006–07	Danish Superliga	6	0			–		0	0	0	0	6	0	
Brøndby IF	2007–08	Danish Superliga	2	0			–		0	0	0	0	2	0	
Brøndby IF	2008–09	Danish Superliga	13	0			–		1	0	0	0	14	0	
Brøndby IF	2009–10	Danish Superliga	26	0			–		5	1	0	0	31	1	
Brøndby IF	2010–11	Danish Superliga	7	1			–		5	0	0	0	12	1	
Brøndby IF	Total	Danish Superliga	54	1	0	0	0	0	11	1	0	0	65	2	–
Career total			83	2	0	0	0	0	12	1	0	0	95	3	–
