= 1997–98 Danish Superliga =

8th season of Danish Superliga

Faxe Kondi Ligaen
- Season: 1997-98
- Champions: Brøndby IF
- Relegated: Ikast FS; Odense BK

The 1997–98 Danish Superliga season was the 8th season of the Danish Superliga league championship, governed by the Danish Football Association. It took place from the first match on July 25, 1997, to final match on June 1, 1998.

The Danish champions qualified for the UEFA Champions League 1998-99 qualification, while the second and third placed teams qualified for the qualification round of the UEFA Cup 1998-99. The fourth to six placed teams qualified for the UEFA Intertoto Cup 1998, while the two lowest placed teams of the tournament was directly relegated to the Danish 1st Division. Likewise, the Danish 1st Division champions and runners-up were promoted to the Superliga.

== Table ==
Pos	Team	Pld	W	D	L	GF	GA	GD	Pts	Qualification or relegation
1	Brøndby IF (C)	33	24	4	5	81	33	+48	76	Qualification to Champions League second qualifying round
2	Silkeborg IF	33	17	12	4	55	31	+24	63	Qualification to UEFA Cup second qualifying round
3	FC København	33	18	7	8	66	48	+18	61	Qualification to Cup Winners' Cup qualifying round
4	Vejle BK	33	16	4	13	53	51	+2	52	Qualification to UEFA Cup second qualifying round
5	AB Copenhagen	33	13	8	12	61	52	+9	47	Qualification to Intertoto Cup second round
6	Lyngby FC	33	13	6	14	53	62	−9	45	Qualification to Intertoto Cup first round
7	Aalborg BK	33	12	8	13	54	48	+6	44	
8	Aarhus GF	33	11	10	12	53	52	+1	43	
9	Herfølge BK	33	9	7	17	44	69	−25	34	
10	Aarhus Fremad	33	9	6	18	51	73	−22	33	
11	Ikast FS (R)	33	8	5	20	51	86	−35	29	Relegation to Danish 1st Division
12	Odense BK (R)	33	6	7	20	40	57	−17	25	Relegation to Danish 1st Division

Rules for classification: 1) points; 2) goal difference; 3) number of goals scored.
(C) Champions; (R) Relegated

== Results ==
Home \ Away	AB	AGF	BIF	FCK	HBK	IFS	LFC	OB	SIF	VB	AAB	AAF	AB	AGF	BIF	FCK	HBK	IFS	LFC	OB	SIF	VB	AAB	AAF
AB		4–4	1–1	1–1	2–1	1–2	4–4	2–1	1–2	3–2	2–0	6–1			3–1	2–1			2–0	1–3			4–2	
AGF	1–1		0–3	1–3	2–0	3–1	1–1	5–2	2–2	1–2	0–1	1–1	3–2			2–2			0–1	1–1		0–0	4–1	
Brøndby IF	2–1	2–0		2–0	5–1	5–0	2–1	3–2	1–2	1–2	1–0	4–2		1–1			0–0	3–1			0–0	5–0		7–1
FC Copenhagen	2–1	2–1	4–1		3–1	3–1	3–2	0–2	1–1	2–1	4–3	1–1			1–4			3–1				4–1	0–4	3–1
Herfølge BK	0–0	1–3	1–2	2–2		2–1	2–4	4–1	0–2	3–1	1–2	0–2	0–3	2–2		1–0			2–1	1–0	0–4			
Ikast FS	0–4	1–3	2–4	1–2	4–1		1–1	1–4	2–2	1–3	0–2	2–1	1–1	3–1			4–3				2–1			1–2
Lyngby BK	1–1	3–0	1–7	0–4	1–1	5–4		1–0	4–1	0–2	4–1	0–2			0–2	2–1		3–4		4–0			2–1	
Odense BK	3–0	1–2	0–1	2–3	3–3	1–2	0–1		1–3	2–1	0–0	1–1			0–1	1–2		5–0					0–1	1–3
Silkeborg IF	1–0	2–0	1–2	1–1	2–0	3–2	0–0	1–1		2–1	4–0	3–1	1–0	0–2		1–1			3–0	1–1		2–1		
Vejle BK	1–4	1–0	1–4	1–0	3–0	2–0	1–0	2–0	1–1		1–1	4–2	1–0				4–2	4–0	3–0	3–0				3–3
AaB	6–1	2–4	3–0	0–1	2–3	2–2	5–0	1–1	2–2	3–0		1–0			0–1		2–3	1–1			0–0	1–0		3–1
Aarhus Fremad	2–3	2–1	1–3	2–6	1–2	5–3	2–3	2–0	1–3	4–0	1–1		1–0	1–2			1–1		0–3		0–1			

Source: Danskfodbold.com

== Top goalscorers ==
Rank	Player	Club	Goals
1	(Denmark) Ebbe Sand	Brøndby IF	28
2	(Denmark) Søren Hermansen	Aarhus Fremad	19
3	(Denmark) Lars Brøgger	Ikast fS	17
4	(Denmark) Chris Hermansen	Herfølge/AB	16
5	(Denmark) Christian Lundberg	Ikast fS	15
6	(Denmark) Bo Hansen	Brøndby IF	14
7	(Denmark) Nocko Jokovic	Silkeborg IF	13
7	(Denmark) Peter Graulund	Vejle BK	13
9	(Denmark) Jesper Falck	AB Cph.	12
10	(Denmark) David Nielsen	FC København	11
10	(Denmark) Steffen Højer	Aalborg BK	11
10	(Denmark) Claus Jensen	Lyngby FC	11

== Attendances ==
No.	Club	Average	Highest
1	FC København	11,679	33,124
2	Brøndby IF	11,468	17,612
3	AGF	6,983	13,200
4	AaB	6,963	13,964
5	OB	6,239	13,059
6	Silkeborg IF	4,975	7,270
7	Vejle BK	4,376	8,236
8	AB	3,060	9,304
9	Aarhus Fremad	3,018	15,500
10	Lyngby BK	2,826	8,176
11	Ikast fS	2,355	5,113
12	Herfølge BK	2,083	6,091

== See also ==
- 1997-98 in Danish football
