= Kenneth Jensen =

Danish footballer (born 1969)

Personal information
- Date of birth: 14 October 1969 (age 57)
- Position: Winger

Senior career*
Years	Team	Apps	(Gls)
1991–1992	B 1913		
1993–1994	B 1909		
1994–1996	Odense BK		
1997	B 1909		
1997–1998	FC København		
1999–2004	Herfølge BK		
- * Club domestic league appearances and goals

Kenneth Jensen (born 14 October 1969) is a Danish former footballer.

== Club career ==
Jensen is mostly remembered for being part of the Herfølge team that surprisingly won the 1999–2000 Danish Superliga. That season he was topscorer for the club and scored goal of the year as well.

Jensen retired in 2004, after avoiding relegation from the Danish Superliga with Herfølge. Before his move to the club in 1999, he played for FC Copenhagen, OB, B 1909, B 1913 and OKS. Jensen mainly played as a left winger during his career, which was plagued by injuries.
