= New Firm =

New Firm may refer to the following football rivalries:

- Copenhagen derby, or New Firm, between Brøndby and Copenhagen
- New Firm (Scotland), between Aberdeen and Dundee United
