= Allan Jensen =

Allan Jensen may refer to:

- Al Jensen (born 1958), former Canadian ice hockey goaltender
- Allan Jensen (footballer) (1922–2003), Australian rules footballer
- Allan Ravn Jensen (born 1974), Danish footballer
- Allan Bak Jensen (born 1978), Danish footballer
