= Kevin Stuhr Ellegaard =

Danish footballer (born 1983)

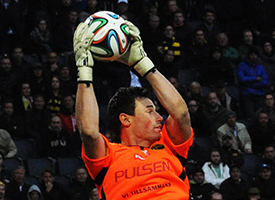
- Ellegaard in 2014

Personal information
- Full name: Kevin Stuhr Ellegaard
- Date of birth: 23 May 1983 (age 43)
- Place of birth: Copenhagen, Denmark
- Height: 1.98 m (6 ft 6 in)
- Position: Goalkeeper

Team information
- Current team: B.93 (goalkeeper coach)

Youth career
- Brøndby
- Hvidovre
- BSV
- KB
- Nordsjælland

Senior career*
Years	Team	Apps	(Gls)
2002–2005	Manchester City	4	(0)
2005	→ Blackpool (loan)	2	(0)
2005–2007	Hertha BSC	2	(0)
2005–2007	→ Hertha BSC II	31	(0)
2007–2010	Randers	95	(0)
2010–2011	Heerenveen	28	(0)
2012–2019	IF Elfsborg	216	(0)
2020–2021	Helsingør	45	(0)
2022	AaB	0	(0)
Total		423	(0)

International career
1998–1999	Denmark U16	6	(0)
1999–2000	Denmark U17	17	(0)
2000–2002	Denmark U19	7	(0)
2003–2004	Denmark U20	6	(0)
2004–2006	Denmark U21	20	(0)

Managerial career
- 2025–: B.93 (goalkeeper coach)
- * Club domestic league appearances and goals

Kevin Stuhr Ellegaard (né Larsen born 23 May 1983) is a Danish retired professional footballer who played as a goalkeeper. He is currently the goalkeeper coach of B.93.

He has played for Manchester City and Blackpool in England, as well as German club Hertha BSC and Dutch club SC Heerenveen.

Ellegaard played 56 games for various Danish youth selections, including 20 games for the Denmark U21 national team. He was named in several squads for the Denmark national team but never made an appearance at senior level.

== Club career ==
Born in Copenhagen, Ellegaard spent his youth years in various Zealand clubs. In July 2002 he moved from Farum BK to Manchester City. In the 2003–04 season, he made two full appearances and two substitute appearances for the club in the league, replacing David Seaman both times when coming on as a substitute. He was loaned out to Blackpool for a month in January 2005, where he played two league matches in League One. Stuhr-Ellegaard moved to Germany to play for Hertha BSC in summer 2005. He had a hard time forcing his way into the starting line-up, and only played two Bundesliga games for the team. He moved to Danish club Randers FC as a free agent in the summer 2007.

In his first half season with Randers, Ellegaard conceded only 15 goals in 18 matches. He went on to play all Randers games in his first two seasons with the club, helping Randers finish sixth in the 2007–08 and fifth in the 2008–09 Superliga season. In the 2009–10 Superliga season, Ellegaard conceded 15 goals in the first seven games, and was dropped from the starting lineup by coach John Jensen in August. As Randers' results did not improve with new goalkeeper Nathan Coe, Ellegaard was reinstated in October 2009, and conceded only eight goals in the 16-game unbeaten run that secured Randers another season in the top flight. Ellegaard left Randers in June 2010 as they could not agree on a new contract.

In season 2010–11, Dutch club SC Heerenveen had big problems with their goalkeepers, so they decided that they needed to contract a new goalkeeper for a short period. First choice keeper Brian Vandenbussche got injured during a training session, which left Heerenveen with only one other keeper, Kenny Steppe. Heerenveen gave Ellegaard a trial at the club, which led to him signing a one-year contract. In the beginning, Heerenveen saw him as a backup keeper behind Steppe, but Ellegard impressed so much in training that the trainer Ron Jans made him first choice. Despite Ellegard playing 28 matches and impressing both the fans and coaching staff with his play, they decided not to renew his contract because Vandenbussche was coming back from his injury.

On 23 January 2012, Ellegaard signed a three-year contract with Swedish club IF Elfsborg as a free agent.

On 24 January 2020, Ellegaard returned to Denmark and signed with Danish 2nd Division club FC Helsingør. He reached promotion to the Danish 1st Division in his first six months with the club. On 22 December 2021, 38-year old Ellegaard announced his retirement from football. However, on 2 May 2022, Ellegaard came out of retirement when he signed a short-term contract with Danish Superliga club AaB for the rest of the season.

== International career ==
Ellegaard made his debut for the Danish under-16 youth national team in September 1998, and went on to represent various youth national teams for a combined total of 56 games. He made his debut for the Denmark U21 national team in September 2004, and represented the team at the 2006 Under-21 European Championship tournament in May 2006.

While at Manchester City, Ellegaard served as a stand-in for Thomas Sørensen in the initial Denmark national team training sessions ahead of the 2004 European Championship. He was not a part of the Danish squad at the tournament. In the fall of 2007, while playing for Randers, Ellegaard was called up as the Danish third choice goalkeeper due to the injury of Jesper Christiansen. In August 2008, Ellegaard was called up for the national team again, due to a new Jesper Christiansen injury.

== Post retirement and coaching career ==
In February 2022, Ellegaard was hired as a TV expert at Discovery+ in Denmark. He held this position until summer 2024.

On January 24, 2025, Ellegaard was hired as goalkeeper coach at the Danish 1st Division club B.93 under manager Kasper Lorentzen, who Ellegaard previously played with at Randers FC. For Ellegaard, it was his first experience as a coach, in addition to his time in Helsingør where he also coached a bit at the club's academy.

== Career statistics ==
Appearances and goals by club, season and competition
Club	Season	League			National Cup		League Cup		Continental		Other		Total	
Club	Season	Division	Apps	Goals	Apps	Goals	Apps	Goals	Apps	Goals	Apps	Goals	Apps	Goals
Manchester City	2003–04	Premier League	4	0	2	0	1	0	—		—		7	0
Manchester City	2004–05	Premier League	0	0	0	0	0	0	—		—		0	0
Manchester City	Total		4	0	2	0	1	0	—		—		7	0
Blackpool (loan)	2004–05	League One	2	0	1	0	0	0	—		—		3	0
Hertha BSC II	2005–06	Regionalliga Nord	22	0	—		—		—		—		22	0
Hertha BSC II	2006–07	Regionalliga Nord	9	0	—		—		—		—		9	0
Hertha BSC II	Total		31	0	—		—		—		—		31	0
Hertha BSC	2005–06	Bundesliga	2	0	0	0	0	0	—		—		2	0
Hertha BSC	2006–07	Bundesliga	0	0	0	0	0	0	0	0	—		0	0
Hertha BSC	Total		2	0	0	0	0	0	0	0	—		2	0
Randers FC	2007–08	Danish Superliga	33	0	1	0	—		—		—		34	0
Randers FC	2008–09	Danish Superliga	33	0	1	0	—		—		—		34	0
Randers FC	2009–10	Danish Superliga	29	0	1	0	—		6	0	—		36	0
Randers FC	Total		95	0	3	0	—		6	0	—		104	0
SC Heerenveen	2010–11	Eredivisie	28	0	2	0	—		—		—		30	0
IF Elfsborg	2012	Allsvenskan	19	0	1	0	—		5	0	—		25	0
IF Elfsborg	2013	Allsvenskan	29	0	3	0	—		11	0	—		43	0
IF Elfsborg	2014	Allsvenskan	28	0	8	0	—		5	0	1	0	42	0
IF Elfsborg	2015	Allsvenskan	29	0	4	0	—		6	0	—		39	0
IF Elfsborg	2016	Allsvenskan	30	0	4	0	—		—		—		34	0
IF Elfsborg	2017	Allsvenskan	29	0	5	0	—		—		—		34	0
IF Elfsborg	2018	Allsvenskan	30	0	2	0	—		—		—		32	0
IF Elfsborg	2019	Allsvenskan	22	0	3	0	—		—		—		25	0
IF Elfsborg	Total		216	0	30	0	—		27	0	1	0	274	0
FC Helsingør	2020–21	Danish 2nd Division	27	0	0	0	—		—		—		27	0
FC Helsingør	2021–22	Danish 1st Division	18	0	1	0	—		—		—		19	0
FC Helsingør	Total		45	0	1	0	—		—		—		46	0
Career total			423	0	39	0	1	0	33	0	1	0	497	0

== Honours ==
IF Elfsborg

- Allsvenskan: 2012
- Svenska cupen: 2014

Individual

- Randers FC Player of the year: 2007–08
- Eredivisie ING Fair Play-reward
- Denmark's best penalty keeper – Recent statistics showed that out of 29 Danish keepers, Ellegaard is the best one in saving penalties, making him a penalty specialist. He is known for his "double save" in a penalty against AFC Ajax. He had a fantastic 45% rate in penalty saves, which made him the best Danish penalty keeper.
