= Frank Løndal =

Danish footballer (born 1962)

Personal information
- Full name: Frank Løndal Jensen
- Date of birth: 23 March 1962 (age 64)
- Place of birth: Denmark
- Position: Forward

Senior career*
Years	Team	Apps	(Gls)
- Herfølge Boldklub
1989	Næstved Boldklub		
- Herfølge Boldklub

International career
1984	Denmark	1	(0)
- * Club domestic league appearances and goals

Frank Løndal Jensen (born 23 March 1962 in Denmark) is a Danish retired footballer.

== Career ==
Løndal started his career with Herfølge Boldklub, helping them achieve promotion to the Danish top flight with 24 goals at the age of 22. Despite interest from German Bundesliga side SV Werder Bremen, Roda JC in the Netherlands, English club Watford, Panathinaikos in Greece, as well as Rangers, one of the most successful Scottish teams, he signed for Danish top flight outfit Næstved Boldklub before returning to Herfølge Boldklub.

On the 22nd of April 1984, Løndal made his solitary appearance for the Denmark national team against Poland but soon suffered an injury, causing him to miss out on the UEFA Euro 1984 squad.
