= Christian Muomaife =

Nigerian footballer (born 1987)

Chris Muomaife
Personal information
- Full name: Christian Muomaife
- Date of birth: 20 December 1987 (age 38)
- Place of birth: Nigeria
- Position: Striker

Team information
- Current team: ÍF Fuglafjørður
- Number: 9

Youth career
- Planners football club, Viborg F.F. Football Academy

Senior career*
Years	Team	Apps	(Gls)
2006–present–	Viborg FF	56	(14)
2010	→Hobro IK		
2011	→ÍF Fuglafjørður	14	(12)
- * Club domestic league appearances and goals as of 24 August 2009

Christian "Chris" Muomaife (born 20 December 1987) is a Nigerian professional football player, who currently is playing at ÍF Fuglafjørður. He used to play for the Danish team Viborg FF.
