= Christian Olsen =

Danish footballer (born 1983)

Christian Steen Olsen
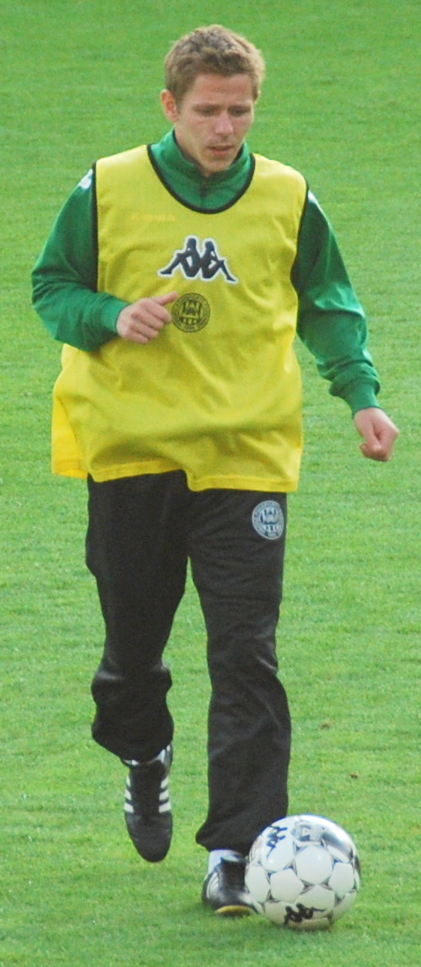
- Christian Olsen, May 2011 (Photo: Lars Schmidt)

Personal information
- Date of birth: 9 November 1983 (age 42)
- Place of birth: Middelfart, Denmark
- Height: 1.74 m (5 ft 8 1/2 in)
- Position: Striker

Team information
- Current team: Playing assistant – Struer Boldklub

Youth career
- Middelfart GB

Senior career*
Years	Team	Apps	(Gls)
2006–2008	FC Midtjylland	34	(13)
2008	→ Viborg FF (loan)	14	(2)
2008–2011	Viborg FF	5	(2)
2011–2012	Skive IK	0	(0)
2012–2013	ÍBV	22	(9)
2013–2014	Tjele Vest Sport		
2014–	Struer Boldklub		

Managerial career
- 2014–: Struer Boldklub (playing assistant)
- * Club domestic league appearances and goals

Christian Olsen (born 9 November 1983) is a Danish football striker, who currently is playing as a playing assistant for Struer Boldklub.

Playing for amateur club Middelfart GB in the Danish fourth division (Danmarksserien), Olsen was the league top goalscorer in the 2005–06 season. He had trials with both Odense BK and Viborg FF, from the top-flight Danish Superliga championship. They did not sign him, and he moved to Superliga club FC Midtjylland (FCM) instead. He was known as "Speedy" when he was there for his quick acceleration and incredible speed.

He dived straight into the Superliga level for FCM, and made himself noticed with five goals in his first five games, all of them as a substitute. In the first half of the 2006–07 season, he took part in 14 of 18 games, 11 of those as a substitute. He scored seven goals in 597 minutes of play, equalling more than a goal per game, in effective playing time.

On 24 June he moved to Skive IK following a highly successful trial at the club.

On 20 Mars 2012 he moved to Icelandic team ÍBV, which was in third place the two seasons before. After the end of the 2012 season, he chose to retire from football at his age 29, deciding to prioritize his family.
