= Copenhagen derby =

Danish football rivalry

- Other names: New Firm
- Location: Greater Copenhagen
- Teams: Brøndby; Copenhagen
- First meeting: Brøndby 1–1 Copenhagen (6 September 1992); 1992–93 Danish Superliga
- Latest meeting: Copenhagen 1–0 Brøndby (8 November 2026); 2026–27 Danish Superliga
- Next meeting: TBD
- Stadiums: Brøndby Stadium (Brøndby); Parken Stadium (Copenhagen)

Statistics
- Total meetings: 136
- Most wins: Copenhagen (65)
- All-time series: Brøndby: 41; Drawn: 30; Copenhagen: 65
- Largest victory: Brøndby 5–0 Copenhagen (16 May 2005); 2004–05 Danish Superliga

The Copenhagen derby, also known as the New Firm, is a Danish football rivalry between Brøndby and Copenhagen. It has been described as the fiercest sporting rivalry in Denmark.

After FC Copenhagen's women's team's promotion to the A-Liga in the 2025–26 season, the first ever women's Copenhagen Derby was played on 29 August 2026. FC Copenhagen surprisingly won the match 3–1. The second Copenhagen Derby in Parken broke the A-Liga attendance record with 8,047 spectators.

== Matches ==
=== Men's football ===
Updated 8 November 2026

Date	Venue	Home	Score	Away	Comp
6 September 1992	Brøndby Stadium	Brøndby IF	1–1	F.C. Copenhagen	DSL
7 October 1992	Parken Stadium	F.C. Copenhagen	2–0	Brøndby IF	DC
15 November 1992	Parken Stadium	F.C. Copenhagen	0–0	Brøndby IF	DSL
25 April 1993	Parken Stadium	F.C. Copenhagen	0–4	Brøndby IF	DSL
13 June 1993	Brøndby Stadium	Brøndby IF	2–3	F.C. Copenhagen	DSL
8 August 1993	Brøndby Stadium	Brøndby IF	0–1	F.C. Copenhagen	DSL
16 October 1993	Parken Stadium	F.C. Copenhagen	3–1	Brøndby IF	DSL
24 April 1994	Parken Stadium	F.C. Copenhagen	2–1	Brøndby IF	DSL
29 May 1994	Brøndby Stadium	Brøndby IF	1–0	F.C. Copenhagen	DSL
23 September 1994	Parken Stadium	F.C. Copenhagen	2–1	Brøndby IF	DSL
30 October 1994	Brøndby Stadium	Brøndby IF	0–4	F.C. Copenhagen	DSL
17 April 1995	Brøndby Stadium	Brøndby IF	2–3	F.C. Copenhagen	DSL
18 June 1995	Parken Stadium	F.C. Copenhagen	1–0	Brøndby IF	DSL
27 August 1995	Brøndby Stadium	Brøndby IF	1–4	F.C. Copenhagen	DSL
24 March 1996	Parken Stadium	F.C. Copenhagen	0–3	Brøndby IF	DSL
23 May 1996	Parken Stadium	F.C. Copenhagen	0–4	Brøndby IF	DSL
31 July 1996	Parken Stadium	F.C. Copenhagen	2–3	Brøndby IF	DSL
20 October 1996	Parken Stadium	F.C. Copenhagen	1–2	Brøndby IF	DSL
19 May 1997	Brøndby Stadium	Brøndby IF	2–0	F.C. Copenhagen	DSL
22 August 1997	Parken Stadium	F.C. Copenhagen	4–1	Brøndby IF	DSL
20 March 1998	Brøndby Stadium	Brøndby IF	2–0	F.C. Copenhagen	DSL
21 May 1998	Parken Stadium	F.C. Copenhagen	1–4	Brøndby IF	DC
24 May 1998	Parken Stadium	F.C. Copenhagen	1–4	Brøndby IF	DSL
30 August 1998	Parken Stadium	F.C. Copenhagen	1–0	Brøndby IF	DSL
14 March 1999	Brøndby Stadium	Brøndby IF	3–2	F.C. Copenhagen	DSL
28 May 1999	Parken Stadium	F.C. Copenhagen	1–0	Brøndby IF	DSL
20 September 1999	Brøndby Stadium	Brøndby IF	3–1	F.C. Copenhagen	DSL
7 November 1999	Parken Stadium	F.C. Copenhagen	1–1	Brøndby IF	DSL
21 May 2000	Brøndby Stadium	Brøndby IF	1–1	F.C. Copenhagen	DSL
27 August 2000	Parken Stadium	F.C. Copenhagen	2–1	Brøndby IF	DSL
8 November 2000	Brøndby Stadium	Brøndby IF	2–0	F.C. Copenhagen	DC
1 April 2001	Brøndby Stadium	Brøndby IF	1–2	F.C. Copenhagen	DSL
10 June 2001	Parken Stadium	F.C. Copenhagen	3–1	Brøndby IF	DSL
16 September 2001	Brøndby Stadium	Brøndby IF	2–0	F.C. Copenhagen	DSL
9 December 2001	Brøndby Stadium	Brøndby IF	1–0	F.C. Copenhagen	DSL
12 May 2002	Parken Stadium	F.C. Copenhagen	1–1	Brøndby IF	DSL
24 August 2002	Parken Stadium	F.C. Copenhagen	2–1	Brøndby IF	DSL
6 April 2003	Parken Stadium	F.C. Copenhagen	1–1	Brøndby IF	DSL
9 April 2003	Brøndby Stadium	Brøndby IF	1–0	F.C. Copenhagen	DC
18 June 2003	Brøndby Stadium	Brøndby IF	0–1	F.C. Copenhagen	DSL
23 August 2003	Brøndby Stadium	Brøndby IF	0–1	F.C. Copenhagen	DSL
9 November 2003	Brøndby Stadium	Brøndby IF	2–2	F.C. Copenhagen	DSL
13 May 2004	Parken Stadium	F.C. Copenhagen	1–0	Brøndby IF	DSL
19 September 2004	Parken Stadium	F.C. Copenhagen	1–3	Brøndby IF	DSL
5 December 2004	Parken Stadium	F.C. Copenhagen	1–1	Brøndby IF	RL
17 February 2005	Brøndby Stadium	Brøndby IF	0–2	F.C. Copenhagen	RL
6 April 2005	Brøndby Stadium	Brøndby IF	1–0	F.C. Copenhagen	DC
10 April 2005	Parken Stadium	F.C. Copenhagen	3–0	Brøndby IF	DSL
20 April 2005	Parken Stadium	F.C. Copenhagen	2–2	Brøndby IF	DC
16 May 2005	Brøndby Stadium	Brøndby IF	5–0	F.C. Copenhagen	DSL
21 September 2005	Brøndby Stadium	Brøndby IF	1–1	F.C. Copenhagen	DSL
8 December 2005	Parken Stadium	F.C. Copenhagen	1–1	Brøndby IF	RL
9 February 2006	Brøndby Stadium	Brøndby IF	1–2	F.C. Copenhagen	RL
5 March 2006	Brøndby Stadium	Brøndby IF	1–0 (a.e.t.)	F.C. Copenhagen	DC
12 March 2006	Brøndby Stadium	Brøndby IF	3–0	F.C. Copenhagen	DSL
30 April 2006	Parken Stadium	F.C. Copenhagen	0–0	Brøndby IF	DSL
1 October 2006	Parken Stadium	F.C. Copenhagen	1–0	Brøndby IF	DSL
5 November 2006	Parken Stadium	F.C. Copenhagen	3–1	Brøndby IF	DSL
11 February 2007	Parken Stadium	F.C. Copenhagen	0–1	Brøndby IF	RL
18 February 2007	Brøndby Stadium	Brøndby IF	1–3	F.C. Copenhagen	RL
15 March 2007	Brøndby Stadium	Brøndby IF	1–0	F.C. Copenhagen	RL
9 May 2007	Brøndby Stadium	Brøndby IF	0–1	F.C. Copenhagen	DSL
23 September 2007	Brøndby Stadium	Brøndby IF	0–1	F.C. Copenhagen	DSL
2 December 2007	Parken Stadium	F.C. Copenhagen	1–1	Brøndby IF	DSL
18 May 2008	Brøndby Stadium	Brøndby IF	2–1	F.C. Copenhagen	DSL
31 August 2008	Brøndby Stadium	Brøndby IF	1–0	F.C. Copenhagen	DSL
2 March 2009	Brøndby Stadium	Brøndby IF	0–1	F.C. Copenhagen	DSL
17 May 2009	Parken Stadium	F.C. Copenhagen	4–0	Brøndby IF	DSL
30 August 2009	Parken Stadium	F.C. Copenhagen	1–1	Brøndby IF	DSL
14 March 2010	Parken Stadium	F.C. Copenhagen	2–0	Brøndby IF	DSL
2 May 2010	Brøndby Stadium	Brøndby IF	0–2	F.C. Copenhagen	DSL
19 September 2010	Parken Stadium	F.C. Copenhagen	2–0	Brøndby IF	DSL
20 March 2011	Parken Stadium	F.C. Copenhagen	3–1	Brøndby IF	DSL
8 May 2011	Brøndby Stadium	Brøndby IF	1–1	F.C. Copenhagen	DSL
24 September 2011	Brøndby Stadium	Brøndby IF	1–2	F.C. Copenhagen	DSL
27 October 2011	Brøndby Stadium	Brøndby IF	0–3	F.C. Copenhagen	DC
20 November 2011	Brøndby Stadium	Brøndby IF	2–1	F.C. Copenhagen	DSL
5 April 2012	Parken Stadium	F.C. Copenhagen	3–1	Brøndby IF	DSL
18 August 2012	Parken Stadium	F.C. Copenhagen	1–1	Brøndby IF	DSL
21 October 2012	Parken Stadium	F.C. Copenhagen	1–0	Brøndby IF	DSL
28 November 2012	Brøndby Stadium	Brøndby IF	1–0 (a.e.t.)	F.C. Copenhagen	DC
5 May 2013	Brøndby Stadium	Brøndby IF	0–0	F.C. Copenhagen	DSL
28 September 2013	Brøndby Stadium	Brøndby IF	3–2	F.C. Copenhagen	DSL
1 December 2013	Brøndby Stadium	Brøndby IF	1–3	F.C. Copenhagen	DSL
4 May 2014	Parken Stadium	F.C Copenhagen	1–1	Brøndby IF	DSL
21 September 2014	Parken Stadium	F.C. Copenhagen	1–0	Brøndby IF	DSL
8 March 2015	Parken Stadium	F.C. Copenhagen	3–1	Brøndby IF	DSL
6 April 2015	Brøndby Stadium	Brøndby IF	0–0	F.C. Copenhagen	DSL
27 September 2015	Brøndby Stadium	Brøndby IF	1–0	F.C. Copenhagen	DSL
8 November 2015	Brøndby Stadium	Brøndby IF	0–0	F.C. Copenhagen	DSL
6 April 2016	Parken Stadium	F.C. Copenhagen	1–1	Brøndby IF	DC
17 April 2016	Parken Stadium	F.C. Copenhagen	2–0	Brøndby IF	DSL
20 April 2016	Brøndby Stadium	Brøndby IF	0–1	F.C. Copenhagen	DC
28 August 2016	Brøndby Stadium	Brøndby IF	1–1	F.C. Copenhagen	DSL
19 February 2017	Parken Stadium	F.C. Copenhagen	0–0	Brøndby IF	DSL
17 April 2017	Brøndby Stadium	Brøndby IF	0–1	F.C. Copenhagen	DSL
14 May 2017	Parken Stadium	F.C. Copenhagen	1–0	Brøndby IF	DSL
25 May 2017	Parken Stadium	F.C. Copenhagen	3–1	Brøndby IF	DC
6 August 2017	Brøndby Stadium	Brøndby IF	1–0	F.C. Copenhagen	DSL
5 November 2017	Parken Stadium	F.C. Copenhagen	0–1	Brøndby IF	DSL
4 February 2018	Parken Stadium	F.C. Copenhagen	0–1	Brøndby IF	DC
15 April 2018	Brøndby Stadium	Brøndby IF	2–1	F.C. Copenhagen	DSL
6 May 2018	Parken Stadium	F.C. Copenhagen	1–1	Brøndby IF	DSL
12 August 2018	Parken Stadium	F.C. Copenhagen	3–1	Brøndby IF	DSL
4 November 2018	Brøndby Stadium	Brøndby IF	0–1	F.C. Copenhagen	DSL
14 April 2019	Brøndby Stadium	Brøndby IF	1–2	F.C. Copenhagen	DSL
5 May 2019	Parken Stadium	F.C. Copenhagen	3–2	Brøndby IF	DSL
6 October 2019	Brøndby Stadium	Brøndby IF	3–1	F.C. Copenhagen	DSL
1 December 2019	Parken Stadium	F.C. Copenhagen	2–1	Brøndby IF	DSL
21 June 2020	Brøndby Stadium	Brøndby IF	1–1	F.C. Copenhagen	DSL
12 July 2020	Parken Stadium	F.C. Copenhagen	0–0	Brøndby IF	DSL
20 September 2020	Parken Stadium	F.C. Copenhagen	1–2	Brøndby IF	DSL
7 March 2021	Brøndby Stadium	Brøndby IF	2–1	F.C. Copenhagen	DSL
11 April 2021	Brøndby Stadium	Brøndby IF	1–3	F.C. Copenhagen	DSL
16 May 2021	Parken Stadium	F.C. Copenhagen	2–1	Brøndby IF	DSL
8 August 2021	Parken Stadium	F.C. Copenhagen	4–2	Brøndby IF	DSL
24 October 2021	Brøndby Stadium	Brøndby IF	2–1	F.C. Copenhagen	DSL
18 April 2022	Parken Stadium	F.C. Copenhagen	2–0	Brøndby IF	DSL
8 May 2022	Brøndby Stadium	Brøndby IF	1–1	F.C. Copenhagen	DSL
7 August 2022	Parken Stadium	F.C. Copenhagen	4–1	Brøndby IF	DSL
16 October 2022	Brøndby Stadium	Brøndby IF	1–1	F.C. Copenhagen	DSL
30 April 2023	Parken Stadium	F.C. Copenhagen	0–1	Brøndby IF	DSL
14 May 2023	Brøndby Stadium	Brøndby IF	1–3	F.C. Copenhagen	DSL
24 September 2023	Brøndby Stadium	Brøndby IF	2–3	F.C. Copenhagen	DSL
12 November 2023	Parken Stadium	F.C. Copenhagen	0–0	Brøndby IF	DSL
1 April 2024	Parken Stadium	F.C. Copenhagen	1–2	Brøndby IF	DSL
12 May 2024	Brøndby Stadium	Brøndby IF	1–3	F.C. Copenhagen	DSL
1 September 2024	Parken Stadium	F.C. Copenhagen	3–1	Brøndby IF	DSL
27 October 2024	Brøndby Stadium	Brøndby IF	0–0	F.C. Copenhagen	DSL
13 April 2025	Parken Stadium	F.C. Copenhagen	1–2	Brøndby IF	DSL
4 May 2025	Brøndby Stadium	Brøndby IF	0–3	F.C. Copenhagen	DSL
13 September 2025	Brøndby Stadium	Brøndby IF	2–1	F.C. Copenhagen	DSL
23 November 2025	Parken Stadium	F.C. Copenhagen	1–0	Brøndby IF	DSL
21 May 2026	Brøndby Stadium	Brøndby IF	1–3 (a.e.t.)	F.C. Copenhagen	DSL EUPO
20 September 2026	Brøndby Stadium	Brøndby IF	0–1	F.C. Copenhagen	DSL
8 November 2026	Parken Stadium	F.C. Copenhagen	1–0	Brøndby IF	DSL

==== Total ====
This gives a total of:

	Matches	Wins F.C. Copenhagen	Draws	Wins Brøndby IF
Danish Superliga	116	58	26	32
Danish Cup	13	4	2	7
Royal League	7	3	2	2
Total	136	65	30	41

=== Women's football ===
Updated 3 October 2026

Date	Venue	Home	Score	Away	Comp
29 August 2026	Brøndby Stadium	Brøndby IF	1–3	F.C. Copenhagen	A-LIGA
3 October 2026	Parken Stadium	F.C. Copenhagen	1–2	Brøndby	A-LIGA

=== Abbreviations ===
- DSL – Danish Superliga
  - EUPO – European play-off match
- DC – Danish Cup
- RL – Royal League

=== Other statistics ===
The biggest win in the series came in the Superliga on 16 May 2005 at Brøndby Stadium, when Brøndby defeated Copenhagen by a scoreline of 5–0.

Highest attendance: 41,201

== Honours ==
Brøndby	Competition	Copenhagen
11	Danish Superliga	16
8	Danish Cup	10
1	Royal League	2
20	Total	28
