= Søren Friis =

Danish footballer (born 1976)

Personal information
- Full name: Søren Engell Friis
- Date of birth: 13 December 1976 (age 49)
- Place of birth: Denmark
- Height: 1.87 m (6 ft 2 in)
- Position: Midfielder

Youth career
- FC Horsens

Senior career*
Years	Team	Apps	(Gls)
1994–2010	AC Horsens		
2000–2001	→ Stensballe IK (loan)		
2010–2012	FC Fredericia		
2012–2014	Brabrand IF		
- * Club domestic league appearances and goals

Søren Engell Friis (born 13 December 1976) is a Danish former professional football midfielder.

Friis played a big part in AC Horsens' promotion to the Superliga in 2004/05, when he was a regular starter at the left wing scored the crucial deciding goal in the second-last match of the season against BK Skjold in Copenhagen. It was in that game the promotion was secured.

During the club's time in the Superliga Friis has been on and off the team, but has, however, participated in many important matches and scored 3 league goals.
