= Chris Hermansen =

Danish footballer (born 1975)

Personal information
- Full name: Chris Mikkelborg Hermansen
- Date of birth: 23 January 1975 (age 51)
- Place of birth: Esbjerg, Denmark
- Height: 1.80 m (5 ft 11 in)
- Position: Forward

Senior career*
Years	Team	Apps	(Gls)
1992–1994	Esbjerg fB		
1994	1. FC Köln		
1995	Ikast FS		
1995–1996	Esbjerg fB		
1996–1998	Herfølge BK		
1998–2000	AB		
2000–2004	Herfølge BK		
2004–2005	Vejle BK		
2006–2007	Kolding FC		

International career
1993–1995	Denmark U19	3	(0)
1997	Denmark U21	3	(0)
- * Club domestic league appearances and goals

Chris Hermansen (born 23 January 1975) is a retired football player, who most notably won the 1999 Danish Cup with Akademisk Boldklub (AB). He played as a forward and scored 73 goals in 174 games in the Danish Superliga from 1996 to 2004. Hermansen played five games for Danish youth selections, including three games for the Denmark national under-21 football team.

During his club career, Hermansen played for Esbjerg fB, 1. FC Köln, Ikast FS, Herfølge BK, AB, Vejle BK and Kolding FC.

After retiring as a player, Hermansen took up coaching, and became the coach in the football club Løsning IF.

Hermansen was part of the Herfølge squad that won the 1999–2000 Danish Superliga, having re-joined them half way through that season from AB.

== Honours ==
Akademisk Boldklub

- Danish Cup: 1998–99
