= 1941–42 Danish War Tournament =

Danish War Tournament
- Season: 1941–42
- Champions: Boldklubben af 1893

Statistics of Danish War Tournament in the 1941/1942 season.

== Series 1 ==
Pos	Team	Pld	W	D	L	GF	GA	GD	Pts
1	Boldklubben 1909	18	11	3	4	65	31	+34	25
2	Aalborg Boldspilklub	18	10	4	4	36	22	+14	24
3	Aarhus Gymnastikforening	18	11	1	6	41	29	+12	23
4	Odense Boldklub	18	8	3	7	53	48	+5	19
5	Esbjerg fB	18	6	5	7	42	44	−2	17
6	Boldklubben 1913	18	7	3	8	36	38	−2	17
7	Randers Sportsklub Freja	18	8	1	9	38	44	−6	17
8	Vejle Boldklub	18	8	0	10	34	50	−16	16
9	Vejen SF	18	4	4	10	24	41	−17	12
10	AIA	18	4	2	12	34	56	−22	10

== Series 2 ==
Pos	Team	Pld	W	D	L	GF	GA	GD	Pts
1	Østerbros Boldklub	18	13	3	2	73	22	+51	29
2	KFUM	18	11	5	2	60	30	+30	27
3	B 1901	18	11	3	4	42	35	+7	25
4	Helsingør IF	18	11	2	5	89	34	+55	24
5	Boldklubben 1908	18	9	3	6	57	40	+17	21
6	Slagelse B&I	18	8	2	8	53	63	−10	18
7	Nakskov	18	5	5	8	35	42	−7	15
8	Dragør Boldklub	18	5	0	13	49	82	−33	10
9	Toreby-Grænge BK	18	2	3	13	27	64	−37	7
10	Korsør Boldklub	18	2	0	16	23	96	−73	4

== Series 3 ==
Pos	Team	Pld	W	D	L	GF	GA	GD	Pts
1	Boldklubben Frem	14	11	0	3	49	22	+27	22
2	Boldklubben af 1893	14	9	2	3	40	26	+14	20
3	Kjøbenhavns Boldklub	14	7	3	4	34	28	+6	17
4	Akademisk Boldklub	14	7	2	5	36	30	+6	16
5	Fremad Amager	14	7	0	7	35	37	−2	14
6	Køge BK	14	5	1	8	34	38	−4	11
7	Boldklubben 1903	14	3	2	9	20	40	−20	8
8	Hellerup IK	14	1	2	11	19	46	−27	4

== Quarterfinals ==
- Aalborg Boldspilklub 0–1 Akademisk Boldklub
- Kjøbenhavns Boldklub 2–1 KFUM
- Boldklubben 1909 2–2 Boldklubben Frem
  - Boldklubben 1909 was awarded winner by lot.
- Boldklubben af 1893 5–0 Østerbros Boldklub

== Semifinals ==
- Akademisk Boldklub 2–1 Kjøbenhavns Boldklub
- Boldklubben 1909 0–5 Boldklubben af 1893

== Final ==
- Boldklubben af 1893 3–2 Akademisk Boldklub
