= Lars Brøgger =

Danish footballer (born 1970)

Personal information
- Full name: Lars Bang Brøgger
- Date of birth: 22 March 1970 (age 56)
- Place of birth: Copenhagen, Denmark
- Height: 1.82 m (6 ft 0 in)
- Position: Midfielder

Senior career*
Years	Team	Apps	(Gls)
1990–1991	Frem	22	(8)
1991–1996	Fortuna Düsseldorf	25	(2)
1994	→ OB (loan)	21	(4)
1994–1996	→ Dordrecht '90 (loan)	16	(1)
1996–1998	Ikast	62	(21)
1998–2003	Silkeborg	112	(24)
2003–2006	Frem	72	(19)
2006	Fremad Amager	2	(1)
2007	AB 70	5	(0)
- * Club domestic league appearances and goals

Lars Brøgger (born 22 March 1970) is a Danish former professional footballer who played as a midfielder.

== Career ==
Brøgger made his debut in the Danish Superliga as part of Boldklubben Frem on 28 April 1991 in a 1–0 win over Ikast FS. He scored a hat-trick in the on 28 July 1991 in a match against OB.
