= 2000–01 Danish Superliga =

11th season of Danish Superliga

- Season: 2000–01
- Champions: F.C. Copenhagen
- Relegated: Herfølge BK; HFK Sønderjylland

The 2000–01 Danish Superliga season was the 11th season of the Danish Superliga league championship, governed by the Danish Football Association. It took place from the first match on July 22, 2000 to final match on June 13, 2001.

The Danish champions qualified for the second UEFA Champions League 2001-02 qualification round, while the second to third placed teams qualified for the first qualification round of the UEFA Cup 2001-02. The fourth and fifth placed teams qualified for the UEFA Intertoto Cup 2001, while the two lowest placed teams of the tournament was directly relegated to the Danish 1st Division. Likewise, the Danish 1st Division champions and runners-up were promoted to the Superliga.

== Table ==
Pos	Team	Pld	W	D	L	GF	GA	GD	Pts	Qualification or relegation
1	FC København (C)	33	17	12	4	55	27	+28	63	Qualification to Champions League second qualifying round
2	Brøndby IF	33	17	7	9	71	42	+29	58	Qualification to UEFA Cup qualifying round
3	Silkeborg IF	33	15	11	7	49	36	+13	56	Qualification to UEFA Cup first round (Note: Silkeborg IF qualified for UEFA Cup first round by winning the 2000–01 Danish Cup.)
4	FC Midtjylland	33	14	11	8	54	43	+11	53	Qualification to UEFA Cup qualifying round
5	Aalborg BK	33	13	10	10	51	49	+2	49	
6	Viborg FF	33	13	7	13	52	42	+10	46	
7	Odense BK	33	13	7	13	49	45	+4	46	Qualification to Intertoto Cup second round
8	Aarhus GF	33	13	5	15	54	58	−4	44	Qualification to Intertoto Cup first round
9	Lyngby BK	33	12	8	13	40	53	−13	44	
10	AB Copenhagen	33	8	15	10	43	41	+2	39	
11	Herfølge BK (R)	33	7	9	17	41	65	−24	30	Relegation to Danish 1st Division
12	Haderslev FK/HFK Sønderjylland (R)	33	1	8	24	30	88	−58	11	Relegation to Danish 1st Division

Rules for classification: 1) points; 2) goal difference; 3) number of goals scored.
(C) Champions; (R) Relegated

== Results ==
Home \ Away	AB	AGF	BIF	FCK	FCM	HBK	HFK	LBK	OB	SIF	VFF	AAB	AB	AGF	BIF	FCK	FCM	HBK	HFK	LBK	OB	SIF	VFF	AAB
AB		2–0	0–4	2–2	1–1	1–3	4–0	0–1	3–1	1–1	2–0	1–1			1–1			0–0	1–1	4–0	0–0	0–1		
AGF	1–3		2–0	1–0	3–0	1–1	1–1	1–4	4–1	1–2	3–4	4–0	0–0			0–3	2–0		1–0	5–2				
Brøndby IF	4–2	1–2		1–2	1–1	5–0	6–1	1–2	0–0	1–0	2–0	2–1		2–1				2–2	4–2		1–2		2–1	2–0
FC Copenhagen	1–0	4–0	2–1		3–0	1–1	5–1	1–2	1–0	2–2	1–0	1–1	0–0		3–1				4–0	1–1	2–1			
FC Midtjylland	1–1	1–4	2–2	1–0		2–0	5–1	4–0	1–1	0–0	3–5	1–0	4–2		1–1	2–2			6–0	0–0				
Herfølge BK	0–3	3–1	3–2	0–2	0–1		3–0	2–3	1–1	0–0	1–5	2–3		1–2		3–4	0–2					0–2	1–1	1–2
HFK Sønderjylland	1–1	2–2	0–4	1–2	2–3	1–2		2–4	1–4	1–1	0–4	1–2						1–2		1–3	4–2	0–1		1–1
Lyngby BK	2–1	0–1	1–3	0–0	1–1	3–1	1–1		0–2	0–2	1–0	2–1			3–0			1–1			1–3		0–2	0–0
Odense BK	2–1	4–0	1–2	0–1	1–2	3–1	3–1	1–1		1–0	0–1	2–0		0–4			1–2	4–2					2–1	2–3
Silkeborg IF	1–2	2–1	1–7	0–0	2–1	1–2	0–0	3–0	2–1		2–0	3–0		2–2	0–1	1–1	3–1			3–1	0–1			
Viborg FF	1–1	2–0	1–3	0–0	0–0	3–0	2–1	3–0	1–1	1–1		1–2	0–0	4–2		2–1	1–2		3–1			2–4		
AaB	2–2	2–1	2–2	1–2	1–2	2–2	1–0	2–0	1–1	1–2	1–0		4–1	5–1		1–1	2–1					4–4	2–1	

Source: Danskfodbold.com

== Top goal scorers ==
Rank	Player	Club	Goals
1	(Denmark) Peter Graulund	Brøndby IF	21
2	(Denmark) Henrik Pedersen	Silkeborg IF	20
3	(Denmark) Søren Frederiksen	Viborg FF	19
4	(Denmark) Allan Bak Jensen	FC Midtjylland	16
5	(Sweden) Mattias Jonson	Brøndby IF	14
6	(Denmark) Chris Hermansen	Herfølge BK	13
6	(Denmark) Bo Nielsen	Aarhus GF	13
7	(Faroe Islands) Todi Jónsson	FC København	12
8	(Denmark) Søren Andersen	Odense BK	11
8	(Denmark) Steffen Højer	Viborg FF	11
8	(Denmark) Heine Fernandez	VFF/FCK	11

== Attendances ==
No.	Club	Average	Highest
1	FC København	17,302	40,281
2	Brøndby IF	13,352	28,416
3	AaB	6,557	8,728
4	AGF	5,925	9,623
5	OB	5,808	12,537
6	Silkeborg IF	4,550	9,261
7	FC Midtjylland	3,786	6,259
8	Lyngby BK	3,083	8,191
9	AB	3,065	5,346
10	Viborg FF	2,514	4,132
11	SønderjyskE	2,371	5,234
12	Herfølge BK	1,985	4,468

== See also ==
- 2000-01 in Danish football
