= 1998–99 Danish Superliga =

9th season of Danish Superliga

Faxe Kondi Ligaen
- Season: 1998–99
- Champions: Aalborg BK
- Relegated: Aarhus Fremad; B.93

The 1998–99 Danish Superliga season was the 9th season of the Danish Superliga league championship, governed by the Danish Football Association. It took place from the first match on July 26, 1998, to final match on June 16, 1999.

The Danish champions and runners-up qualified for their respective UEFA Champions League qualification stages, while the third placed team qualified for the qualification round of the 1999–2000 UEFA Cup. The fourth and fifth placed teams qualified for the UEFA Intertoto Cup 1999, while the two lowest placed teams of the tournament were directly relegated to the Danish 1st Division. Likewise, the Danish 1st Division champions and runners-up were promoted to the Superliga.

== Table ==
Pos	Team	Pld	W	D	L	GF	GA	GD	Pts	Qualification or relegation
1	Aalborg BK (C)	33	17	13	3	65	37	+28	64	Qualification to Champions League third qualifying round
2	Brøndby IF	33	19	4	10	73	37	+36	61	Qualification to Champions League second qualifying round
3	AB Copenhagen	33	17	5	11	49	36	+13	56	Qualification to UEFA Cup first round (Note: AB Copenhagen qualified for UEFA Cup first round by winning the 1998–99 Danish Cup.)
4	Lyngby FC	33	14	10	9	55	60	−5	52	Qualification to UEFA Cup qualifying round
5	Herfølge BK	33	12	11	10	44	36	+8	47	Qualification to Intertoto Cup first round
6	Vejle BK	33	14	5	14	54	48	+6	47	
7	FC København	33	12	10	11	55	52	+3	46	Qualification to Intertoto Cup second round
8	Viborg FF	33	13	5	15	61	59	+2	44	
9	Silkeborg IF	33	10	14	9	52	53	−1	44	
10	Aarhus GF	33	11	10	12	45	55	−10	43	
11	Aarhus Fremad (R)	33	7	8	18	51	73	−22	29	Relegation to Danish 1st Division
12	Boldklubben 1893 (R)	33	3	3	27	22	80	−58	12	Relegation to Danish 1st Division

Rules for classification: 1) points; 2) goal difference; 3) number of goals scored.
(C) Champions; (R) Relegated

== Results ==
Home \ Away	AB	AGF	B93	BIF	FCK	HBK	LFC	SIF	VB	VFF	AAB	AAF	AB	AGF	B93	BIF	FCK	HBK	LFC	SIF	VB	VFF	AAB	AAF
AB		1–1	7–0	0–4	4–1	1–0	1–3	4–2	0–1	1–1	1–1	1–0		1–0	1–3		0–0	2–1			2–0		0–1	
AGF	3–1		2–1	1–3	2–1	2–1	1–0	2–3	2–1	3–2	1–0	3–2				3–3			1–1	2–3		0–0		1–1
B 1893	0–1	1–2		1–5	0–0	1–2	1–3	0–1	0–1	0–5	1–5	1–3		4–2		1–0	1–2				0–2		0–3	
Brøndby IF	0–1	4–1	4–1		3–2	5–1	2–3	3–0	1–2	2–5	1–2	2–0	3–0					1–0	6–0	3–0		2–1		1–1
FC Copenhagen	1–0	0–2	1–0	1–0		0–3	5–1	2–2	0–1	3–2	2–2	2–2		1–1		1–0		0–1	2–0			4–2		3–0
Herfølge BK	0–1	1–1	3–1	1–2	2–3		0–2	1–1	2–2	4–1	0–0	3–1		0–0	0–0						2–0		3–2	2–2
Lyngby FC	0–3	1–1	2–1	2–6	3–1	0–0		0–0	2–0	2–3	2–2	1–1	3–2		1–0			1–3		2–2		3–1	1–1	
Silkeborg IF	1–2	2–0	2–0	1–2	3–3	0–1	1–1		1–0	1–2	0–0	4–1	1–1		2–2		2–2	1–1			4–3		0–0	
Vejle BK	0–2	3–0	2–0	1–2	1–3	1–1	1–2	4–1		4–0	0–1	4–2		2–2		0–0	1–0		1–2			4–1		4–1
Viborg FF	0–1	3–1	5–0	2–0	1–0	0–3	5–2	2–1	0–1		1–2	2–4	1–0		5–1			1–0		3–3			0–0	
AaB	2–0	4–0	2–0	1–0	3–3	1–1	3–3	2–4	5–2	1–1		3–1		2–1		0–0	4–3				4–2			3–2
Aarhus Fremad	1–4	2–1	2–0	1–3	3–3	0–1	1–2	2–2	3–3	3–1	1–3		1–3		2–0				2–4	0–1		3–2		

Source: Danskfodbold.com

== Top goalscorers ==
Rank	Player	Club	Goals
1	(Denmark) Heine Fernandez	Viborg FF	23
2	(Denmark) Chris Hermansen	AB Copenhagen	19
2	(Denmark) Ebbe Sand	Brøndby IF	19
4	(Denmark) Søren Hermansen	Lyngby FC	18
5	(Denmark) Søren Frederiksen	Aalborg BK	17
6	(Denmark) Carsten Fredgaard	Lyngby FC	16
6	(Denmark) Henrik Pedersen	Silkeborg IF	16
8	(Denmark) David Nielsen	FC København	15
9	(Denmark) Kasper Dalgas	Vejle BK	13
10	(Denmark) Bo Hansen	Brøndby IF	12
10	(Denmark) Bo Nielsen	Aarhus GF	12

== Attendances ==
#	Football club	Average attendance
1	FC København	12,165
2	AaB	10,224
3	Brøndby IF	10,143
4	AGF	5,382
5	VB	4,138
6	Silkeborg IF	3,852
7	AB	3,202
8	Viborg FF	2,543
9	Lyngby FC	2,455
10	Herfølge BK	2,254
11	B.93	1,481
12	Aarhus Fremad	1,456

== See also ==
- 1998-99 in Danish football
