= 1987 Danish 1st Division =

42nd season of Danish 1st Division

Danish 1st Division
- Season: 1987

The 1987 Danish 1st Division season was the 42nd season of the Danish 1st Division league championship, governed by the Danish Football Association.

The Danish champions qualified for the European Cup 1988-89 qualification, while the second placed team qualified for the qualification round of the UEFA Cup 1988-89. The two lowest placed teams of the tournament was directly relegated to the Danish 2nd Division. Likewise, the Danish 2nd Division champions and runners-up were promoted to the 1st Division.

== Table ==
Pos	Team	Pld	W	D	L	GF	GA	GD	Pts
1	Brøndby IF	26	22	3	1	63	17	+46	47
2	Ikast FS	26	16	6	4	53	26	+27	38
3	Aarhus GF	26	15	6	5	43	22	+21	36
4	Odense BK	26	12	7	7	39	26	+13	31
5	Vejle BK	26	13	4	9	53	39	+14	30
6	Næstved IF	26	11	6	9	56	46	+10	28
7	Brønshøj BK	26	10	7	9	32	33	−1	27
8	Lyngby BK	26	9	8	9	42	38	+4	26
9	B 1903	26	8	10	8	36	35	+1	26
10	Aalborg BK	26	7	6	13	27	38	−11	20
11	KB	26	6	6	14	30	43	−13	18
12	Herfølge BK	26	5	5	16	17	53	−36	15
13	Hvidovre IF	26	5	4	17	25	57	−32	14
14	Kastrup BK	26	1	6	19	19	62	−43	8

== Results ==
Home \ Away	AaB	AGF	B03	BIF	BBK	HBK	HIF	IFS	KAS	KBK	LBK	NIF	OB	VBK
Aalborg BK	—	0–1	2–2	1–2	2–1	0–1	2–1	0–3	2–0	3–1	2–1	2–1	0–1	2–3
Aarhus GF	1–1	—	2–1	0–2	2–0	7–1	3–1	1–0	1–0	2–1	3–3	2–2	0–0	4–0
B 1903	0–0	0–2	—	2–1	2–3	1–1	2–2	2–3	5–0	4–0	0–2	2–1	1–1	0–2
Brøndby IF	3–1	1–0	2–1	—	4–1	3–1	4–0	2–2	3–0	5–0	2–1	1–0	2–0	2–1
Brønshøj BK	2–1	1–0	0–0	1–2	—	2–0	1–1	0–2	2–1	2–1	1–1	2–3	2–0	1–2
Herfølge BK	1–0	0–1	0–0	0–2	0–3	—	2–1	0–1	2–2	0–0	1–4	0–0	2–1	0–4
Hvidovre IF	1–0	1–3	1–1	0–3	0–0	2–0	—	1–0	2–1	0–2	3–0	3–4	0–2	3–6
Ikast FS	4–0	3–1	1–1	0–4	2–0	4–0	3–1	—	1–0	2–2	1–0	5–1	4–0	4–0
Kastrup BK	0–0	0–2	0–1	1–1	1–2	1–2	1–0	2–2	—	0–4	2–2	1–3	0–1	2–4
Kjøbenhavns BK	0–2	1–1	0–1	0–1	1–1	2–0	3–0	1–3	5–1	—	1–1	0–4	0–2	1–3
Lyngby BK	1–0	0–0	2–2	1–2	1–1	3–0	3–0	5–0	2–2	2–1	—	4–1	0–4	1–5
Næstved IF	1–1	2–3	6–2	0–3	1–2	4–3	6–0	1–1	3–0	3–2	1–0	—	2–2	5–2
Odense BK	2–2	1–0	1–2	0–3	2–0	3–0	3–1	1–1	4–0	0–0	1–2	3–1	—	3–0
Vejle BK	4–1	0–1	0–1	3–3	1–1	2–0	2–0	0–1	6–1	0–1	2–0	0–0	1–1	—

Legend: Blue = home team win; Yellow = draw; Red = away team win.

== Top goalscorers ==
Position	Player	Club	Goals
1	Claus Nielsen	Brøndby IF	20
