= Allan Bak Jensen =

Danish footballer (born 1978)

Personal information
- Date of birth: 21 March 1978 (age 48)
- Place of birth: Herning, Denmark
- Positions: Midfielder; winger; forward

Senior career*
Years	Team	Apps	(Gls)
- Tjørring IF
	Ikast FC	18+	(0+)
-2001	FC Midtjylland	33+	(16+)
2001-2002	SC Heerenveen	7	(1)
- * Club domestic league appearances and goals

Allan Bak Jensen (born 21 March 1978) is a Danish retired footballer.

== Career ==
In 2000/01, Bak Jensen scored 16 goals in the Danish Superliga, and was the second top scorer that season.

At the age of 25, he retired from football due to a long-term back injury.

After retirement, he became an agent and founded Elite Consulting, which is considered to be Denmark's most successful agent group.
