= 2002–03 Danish Superliga =

13th season of Danish Superliga

SAS Ligaen
- Season: 2002–03
- Champions: F.C. Copenhagen
- Relegated: Silkeborg IF; Køge BK

The 2002–03 Danish Superliga season was the 13th season of the Danish Superliga league championship, governed by the Danish Football Association. It took place from the first match on July 27, 2002, to final match on June 22, 2003.

The Danish champions qualified for the second UEFA Champions League 2003-04 qualification round, while the second and third placed teams qualified for the first qualification round of the UEFA Cup 2003-04. The two lowest placed teams of the tournament were directly relegated to the Danish 1st Division. Likewise, the Danish 1st Division champions and runners-up were promoted to the Superliga.

== Table ==
Pos	Team	Pld	W	D	L	GF	GA	GD	Pts	Qualification or relegation
1	FC København (C)	33	17	10	6	51	32	+19	61	Qualification to Champions League second qualifying round
2	Brøndby IF	33	15	11	7	61	35	+26	56	Qualification to UEFA Cup first round
3	Farum BK	33	16	3	14	49	58	−9	51	Qualification to UEFA Cup qualifying round
4	Odense BK	33	12	12	9	55	50	+5	48	Qualification to UEFA Cup qualifying round
5	Esbjerg fB	33	12	11	10	65	57	+8	47	Qualification to UEFA Cup qualifying round
6	Aalborg BK	33	14	4	15	42	45	−3	46	
7	FC Midtjylland	33	11	11	11	49	45	+4	44	
8	Viborg FF	33	11	10	12	58	55	+3	43	
9	AB Copenhagen	33	10	12	11	44	48	−4	42	
10	Aarhus GF	33	10	10	13	49	59	−10	40	
11	Silkeborg IF (R)	33	9	9	15	52	54	−2	36	Relegation to Danish 1st Division
12	Køge BK (R)	33	8	3	22	45	82	−37	27	Relegation to Danish 1st Division

Rules for classification: 1) points; 2) goal difference; 3) number of goals scored.
(C) Champions; (R) Relegated

== Results ==
Home \ Away	AB	AGF	BIF	EFB	FBK	FCK	FCM	KBK	OB	SIF	VFF	AAB	AB	AGF	BIF	EFB	FBK	FCK	FCM	KBK	OB	SIF	VFF	AAB
AB		2–2	1–1	1–2	2–0	0–0	0–3	2–2	0–4	1–0	1–1	3–1		3–1		1–4	1–2			3–1	1–1	3–1		
AGF	1–2		2–2	2–2	2–0	2–2	3–2	1–3	3–2	2–1	1–3	1–0			2–1	1–1	2–2				4–1		2–4	
Brøndby IF	1–3	1–1		1–1	7–1	0–1	4–0	1–2	2–0	2–0	4–0	1–0	0–0			1–1			3–1	2–1	4–0		2–1	
Esbjerg fB	1–1	4–1	1–2		0–2	3–0	3–2	3–4	5–0	1–1	1–5	1–2						0–0	4–1	6–1	4–4			0–1
Farum BK	2–0	2–0	1–2	3–4		0–1	1–0	1–0	2–1	3–2	3–2	1–3			1–1	2–3				2–1	2–1		1–0	
FC Copenhagen	1–0	2–0	2–1	1–0	2–1		1–1	1–0	1–1	2–1	2–2	0–1	1–1	4–1	1–1		4–0					3–0	2–3	
FC Midtjylland	1–1	1–2	1–1	2–0	1–0	2–2		5–0	2–2	2–0	3–1	2–0	3–3	1–1			2–0	1–2				2–1		2–1
Køge BK	2–3	2–0	0–2	1–4	4–2	1–3	2–3		1–2	0–4	2–0	0–2		1–4				0–5	1–1			1–3		1–1
Odense BK	0–0	2–2	1–1	1–1	2–2	0–1	2–0	2–1		2–2	3–0	3–0						2–0	1–0	3–1		4–3	3–1	3–1
Silkeborg IF	3–0	1–0	0–3	1–1	0–1	3–0	1–1	3–4	1–1		1–1	0–0		2–1	4–3	2–2	5–1						2–3	
Viborg FF	2–1	0–0	1–1	6–0	1–3	0–3	1–1	1–4	0–0	0–0		2–2	3–0			4–1			0–0	6–1				1–3
AaB	1–0	1–2	3–1	0–1	1–3	3–0	1–0	1–0	2–1	1–0	2–3		0–4	2–0	1–2		1–2	1–1				3–4		

Source: Danskfodbold.com

== Top goal scorers ==
Rank	Player	Club	Goals
1	(Denmark) Søren Frederiksen	Viborg FF	18
1	(Denmark) Jan Kristiansen	Esbjerg fB	18
2	(Denmark) Frank Kristensen	FC Midtjylland	15
3	(Denmark) Tommy Bechmann	Esbjerg fB	13
4	(Denmark) Sammy Youssouf	Akademisk Boldklub	12
5	(Egypt) Mohamed Zidan	Akademisk Boldklub	11
5	(Denmark) Jess Thorup	Esbjerg fB	11
5	(Faroe Islands) Todi Jónsson	FC København	11
5	(Sweden) Mattias Jonson	Brøndby IF	11
5	(Denmark) Peter Møller	FC København	11

== Attendances ==
No.	Club	Average	Highest
1	FC København	22,009	40,254
2	Brøndby IF	14,734	31,508
3	AGF	10,454	20,104
4	AaB	7,835	11,286
5	OB	6,865	14,528
6	Esbjerg fB	5,037	10,641
7	Silkeborg IF	4,395	7,229
8	Viborg FF	4,100	8,663
9	FC Nordsjælland	3,329	9,755
10	AB	3,072	7,321
11	FC Midtjylland	2,993	6,438
12	Køge BK	2,000	5,502
