= Frank Kristensen =

Danish footballer (born 1977)

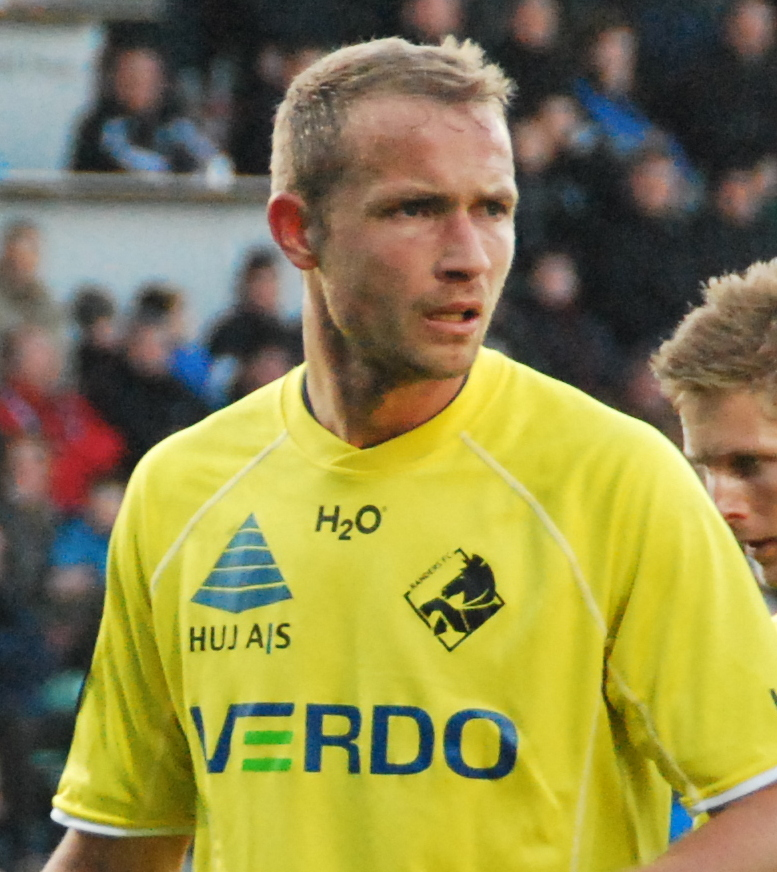
- Kristensen in 2012

Personal information
- Full name: Frank Rosendahl; Kristensen Michalski
- Date of birth: 10 March 1977 (age 49)
- Place of birth: Agger, Thisted, Denmark
- Height: 1.86 m (6 ft 1 in)
- Position: Forward

Youth career
- Vestervig/Agger IF
- 1996–1997: Ikast FS

Senior career*
Years	Team	Apps	(Gls)
1997–1999	Ikast FS	15	(4)
1999–2011	Midtjylland	330	(136)
2011–2012	Randers	39	(10)
2013–2014	Midtjylland	17	(0)
Total		401	(150)

International career
1999	Denmark U21	3	(0)

Managerial career
- 2014–2015: FC Midtjylland (forward coach)
- 2017: Vendsyssel FF (assistant)
- 2018: Vildbjerg SF (women)
- 2019–: Sportsstar College
- * Club domestic league appearances and goals

Frank Rosendahl Kristensen Michalski (born 10 March 1977) is a Danish football coach and former professional player who played as a forward.

He is nicknamed Farlige Frank ("Dangerous Frank").
