= 1999–2000 Danish Superliga =

10th season of Danish Superliga

Faxe Kondi Ligaen
- Season: 1999–2000
- Champions: Herfølge BK
- Relegated: Vejle BK; Esbjerg fB

The 1999–2000 Danish Superliga season was the 10th season of the Danish Superliga league championship, governed by the Danish Football Association. It took place from the first match on July 24, 1999, to final match on May 28, 2000.

The Danish champions qualified for the third UEFA Champions League 2000-01 qualification round, the runner-up entered the Champions League in the second qualification round, while the third placed team qualified for the first qualification round of the UEFA Cup 2000-01. The fourth and fifth placed teams qualified for the UEFA Intertoto Cup 2000, while the two lowest placed teams of the tournament was directly relegated to the Danish 1st Division. Likewise, the Danish 1st Division champions and runners-up were promoted to the Superliga.

== Table ==
Pos	Team	Pld	W	D	L	GF	GA	GD	Pts	Qualification or relegation
1	Herfølge BK (C)	33	16	8	9	52	49	+3	56	Qualification to Champions League third qualifying round
2	Brøndby IF	33	15	9	9	56	37	+19	54	Qualification to Champions League second qualifying round
3	AB Copenhagen	33	14	10	9	52	35	+17	52	Qualification to UEFA Cup qualifying round
4	Viborg FF	33	15	7	11	56	50	+6	52	Qualification to UEFA Cup first round (Note: Viborg FF qualified for UEFA Cup first round by winning the 1999–2000 Danish Cup.)
5	Aalborg BK	33	12	13	8	57	40	+17	49	Qualification to Intertoto Cup second round
6	Silkeborg IF	33	13	10	10	49	33	+16	49	Qualification to Intertoto Cup first round
7	Lyngby FC	33	14	5	14	51	55	−4	47	
8	FC København	33	12	8	13	44	37	+7	44	
9	Odense BK	33	11	10	12	42	44	−2	43	
10	Aarhus GF	33	9	9	15	36	55	−19	36	
11	Vejle BK (R)	33	7	11	15	38	68	−30	32	Relegation to Danish 1st Division
12	Esbjerg fB (R)	33	8	4	21	40	70	−30	28	Relegation to Danish 1st Division

Rules for classification: 1) points; 2) goal difference; 3) number of goals scored.
(C) Champions; (R) Relegated

== Results ==
Home \ Away	AB	AGF	BIF	EFB	FCK	HBK	LFC	OB	SIF	VB	VFF	AAB	AB	AGF	BIF	EFB	FCK	HBK	LFC	OB	SIF	VB	VFF	AAB
AB		1–0	2–0	1–2	1–2	2–2	3–0	0–2	1–1	1–1	6–0	1–1		2–3	2–0		0–2	3–0	2–2		2–0			
AGF	2–2		0–2	1–0	1–0	1–1	3–0	3–3	2–1	1–2	0–4	1–1				4–3	1–0	2–3		0–1		2–0		
Brøndby IF	3–0	3–0		3–1	3–1	2–2	1–0	2–1	1–0	4–0	4–1	1–0		2–0		2–3	1–1	5–0	2–2		0–0			
Esbjerg fB	0–1	0–1	2–0		2–0	1–2	2–3	2–0	0–3	1–1	1–2	0–0	0–0							0–2		3–1	1–2	0–0
FC Copenhagen	1–2	2–1	1–1	3–0		0–1	1–2	1–0	4–1	1–0	2–1	0–2				3–1		2–0		1–1		1–4		0–0
Herfølge BK	1–2	1–1	0–2	2–0	1–1		4–1	1–0	3–2	1–1	2–1	3–1				3–2				3–3	4–1	3–1	3–2	0–2
Lyngby FC	0–2	3–1	3–0	5–1	1–0	1–2		2–0	1–3	5–1	1–3	3–2		3–0		4–6	0–4	1–0			0–0	0–1		
Odense BK	0–3	4–0	2–1	4–1	2–0	0–1	0–0		0–4	1–1	1–1	2–2	1–1		1–1				1–3				0–1	1–4
Silkeborg IF	1–0	2–0	1–1	4–0	0–0	1–1	3–0	0–1		2–2	1–1	1–1		4–1		2–0	2–1			1–0			1–0	
Vejle BK	0–0	1–1	0–4	2–1	2–7	0–2	4–0	1–1	0–4		2–3	2–2	3–1		1–1					0–1	2–1		0–2	1–1
Viborg FF	1–3	1–1	2–0	2–3	2–1	1–0	2–0	2–4	1–1	3–0		7–2	2–1	1–1	2–2		1–1		0–2					
AaB	2–2	1–0	3–1	7–1	0–0	4–0	0–2	1–2	2–1	7–1	2–0		0–2	1–1	3–1				1–1		1–0		1–2	

Source: Danskfodbold.com

== Top goalscorers ==
Rank	Player	Club	Goals
1	(Denmark) Peter Lassen	Silkeborg IF	16
2	(Denmark) Søren Frederiksen	Aalborg BK	14
2	(Sweden) Hans Eklund	Viborg FF	14
2	(Denmark) Søren Andersen	Odense BK	14
5	(Denmark) Heine Fernandez	Viborg FF	13
5	(Denmark) Bent Christensen	Brøndby IF	13
5	(Denmark) Henrik Pedersen	Silkeborg IF	13
8	(Denmark) Jesper Falck	Herfølge BK	10
8	(Denmark) Kenneth Jensen	Herfølge BK	10
8	(Denmark) Ruben Bagger	Brøndby IF	10

== Attendances ==
No.	Club	Average	Highest
1	FC København	12,341	28,818
2	Brøndby IF	11,024	19,283
3	AaB	8,424	10,803
4	OB	6,624	12,485
5	Esbjerg fB	5,493	8,603
6	AGF	5,200	7,705
7	AB	4,356	8,663
8	Silkeborg IF	3,966	6,700
9	Lyngby BK	3,313	6,730
10	Herfølge BK	3,191	7,831
11	Vejle BK	3,139	5,502
12	Viborg FF	2,797	4,832

== See also ==
- 1999-2000 in Danish football
