= 1992–93 Danish Superliga =

3rd season of Danish Superliga

Danish Superliga
- Season: 1992–93
- Champions: F.C. Copenhagen
- Relegated: BK Frem; B 1909

The 1992–93 Danish Superliga season was the 3rd season of the Danish Superliga league championship, governed by the Danish Football Association.

The tournament was held in two rounds. The first round was in the autumn of 1992, and the second in the spring of 1993. The teams placed first to eighth in the first round, and played in the second round. Their scores were reset to zero, and their mutual points were shorted to half.

The two teams placed ninth and tenth in the first round, played in the qualification league in the spring. They had respectively 8 and 7 points with.

The Danish champions qualified for the UEFA Champions League 1993-94 qualification, while the second and third placed teams qualified for the qualification round of the UEFA Cup 1993-94. The teams placed first and second in the qualification league promoted.

== Autumn 1992 ==
=== Table ===
Pos	Team	Pld	W	D	L	GF	GA	GD	Pts	Qualification or relegation
1	FC København	18	9	8	1	29	14	+15	26	Qualification to Spring 1993 competition
2	Odense BK	18	10	3	5	31	17	+14	23	Qualification to Spring 1993 competition
3	Aalborg BK	18	7	7	4	25	17	+8	21	Qualification to Spring 1993 competition
4	Brøndby IF	18	6	9	3	21	20	+1	21	Qualification to Spring 1993 competition
5	Silkeborg IF	18	7	5	6	30	16	+14	19	Qualification to Spring 1993 competition
6	Aarhus GF	18	6	7	5	24	21	+3	19	Qualification to Spring 1993 competition
7	Lyngby BK	18	4	8	6	20	22	−2	16	Qualification to Spring 1993 competition
8	Næstved IF	18	4	7	7	25	35	−10	15	Qualification to Spring 1993 competition
9	BK Frem	18	3	8	7	23	39	−16	14	Qualification to Qualification League
10	B 1909	18	0	6	12	15	42	−27	6	Qualification to Qualification League

Rules for classification: 1) points; 2) goal difference; 3) number of goals scored.

=== Results ===
Home \ Away	AGF	B09	BKF	BIF	FCK	LBK	NIF	OB	SIF	AAB
AGF		1–1	1–1	0–1	0–0	1–0	0–1	3–2	1–0	1–1
B 1909	0–4		1–1	1–2	2–4	1–4	2–2	0–1	0–0	1–2
BK Frem	1–2	3–1		2–2	0–3	0–0	3–1	2–1	2–2	1–1
Brøndby IF	0–0	1–1	3–3		1–1	2–2	2–1	2–0	2–0	0–0
F.C. Copenhagen	3–1	2–1	5–1	0–0		2–2	0–3	1–1	0–0	0–0
Lyngby BK	1–1	3–1	2–1	0–2	1–1		1–1	0–1	1–1	0–2
Næstved IF	2–3	2–2	2–2	1–1	0–2	2–1		0–4	3–1	2–2
OB	3–2	2–0	5–0	2–1	0–2	0–0	4–1		0–3	4–1
Silkeborg IF	1–1	6–0	4–0	3–0	1–2	2–0	4–0	0–1		0–2
AaB	3–2	2–0	3–0	3–0	0–1	1–2	1–1	0–0	1–2	

== Spring 1993 ==
=== Table ===
Pos	Team	Pld	W	D	L	GF	GA	GD	Pts	Qualification or relegation
1	FC København (C)	14	8	3	3	31	23	+8	32	Qualification to Champions League first round
2	Odense BK	14	8	3	3	19	15	+4	31	Qualification to Cup Winners' Cup qualifying round
3	Brøndby IF	14	8	3	3	29	16	+13	30	Qualification to UEFA Cup first round
4	Aalborg BK	14	5	5	4	23	23	0	26	Qualification to UEFA Cup first round
5	Silkeborg IF	14	4	5	5	17	17	0	23	
6	Aarhus GF	14	4	3	7	24	29	−5	21	
7	Lyngby BK	14	4	2	8	22	22	0	18	
8	Næstved IF	14	1	4	9	16	36	−20	14	

Rules for classification: 1) points; 2) goal difference; 3) number of goals scored.
(C) Champions

=== Results ===
Home \ Away	AGF	BIF	FCK	LBK	NIF	OB	SIF	AAB
AGF		1–3	3–5	3–7	1–1	2–2	2–0	2–1
Brøndby IF	2–1		2–3	0–4	3–3	0–1	3–1	5–0
F.C. Copenhagen	3–1	0–4		2–2	2–0	3–1	0–0	4–6
Lyngby BK	0–3	0–2	0–2		5–0	0–1	1–2	1–0
Næstved IF	1–3	1–2	0–3	3–1		1–3	1–4	1–1
OB	2–1	0–0	2–0	2–0	2–0		2–1	0–0
Silkeborg IF	0–0	0–2	1–1	1–0	2–2	4–0		0–2
AaB	2–1	1–1	1–3	1–1	4–2	3–1	1–1	

== Top goalscorers ==
Rank	Player	Club	Goals
1	(Denmark) Peter Møller	Aalborg BK	22
2	(Denmark) Martin Johansen	FC København	12
2	(Denmark) Henrik Jørgensen	Lyngby FC	12
2	(Denmark) Lars Elstrup	Odense BK	12
5	(Denmark) Søren Andersen	Aarhus GF	11
5	(Denmark) Lars Højer Nielsen	FC København	11
7	(Denmark) Peter Rasmussen	Aalborg BK	10
7	(Denmark) Kim Vilfort	Brøndby IF	10
7	(Denmark) Søren Juel	Næstved IF	10
10	(Denmark) Steen Nedergaard	Odense BK	9

== See also ==
- 1992-93 in Danish football
