= Herfølge Boldklub =

Danish football club

- Full name: Herfølge Boldklub 1921
- Nickname: Hærfuglene (The Hoopoes)
- Founded: 1921; 105 years ago
- Ground: Herfølge Stadion
- Website: www.hb.dk
Home colours	Away colours

Herfølge Boldklub is a Danish football club founded in 1921. It is based in Herfølge, a southern suburb of Køge in the eastern part of Zealand. In 2009, the club shared its licence, and merged its professional football with Køge BK to form HB Køge.

== History ==
On 27 February 2007, the club agreed, at an extraordinary general meeting, a professional football merger with Køge Boldklub, to form HB Køge. The merger was halted by the Danish Football Association in March 2007, due to a missed deadline. Because Køge Boldklub got into financial problems in April 2007, the merger was abandoned.

Eventually, in 2009, the club merged its first team with Køge BK and formed HB Køge, but kept their youth selections separate.

== Former players ==
- Frank Løndal – made one appearance for the Denmark national team

== Honours ==
- Danish Superliga
  - Champions: 1999–2000
- Zealand Series
  - Winners: 1990^{‡}
  - Runners-up: 1993^{‡}

^{‡}: Won by reserve team

== Season-by-season results ==
Season	Pos	Pts	Pld	W	D	L	GF	GA	GD
08-09: Viasat Sport Divisionen	#1/16	71	30	22	5	3	77	27	+50
07-08: Viasat Sport Divisionen	#4/16	51	30	15	6	9	55	43	+12
06-07: Viasat Sport Divisionen	#9/16	43	30	12	7	11	54	41	+13
05-06: Viasat Sport Divisionen	#9/16	40	30	11	7	12	51	41	+10
04-05: SAS Ligaen	#11/12	25	33	6	7	20	29	71	−42
03-04: SAS Ligaen	#10/12	31	33	8	7	18	34	57	−23
02-03: 1. Division	#1/16	69	30	22	3	5	74	38	+36
01-02: 1. Division	#5/16	53	30	15	8	7	58	36	+22
00-01: Faxe Kondi Ligaen	#11/12	30	33	7	9	17	41	65	−24
99-00: Faxe Kondi Ligaen	#1/12	56	33	16	8	9	52	49	+3
98–99: Faxe Kondi Ligaen	#5/12	47	33	12	11	10	44	36	+8

Green denotes promotion, red denotes relegation.
