= Brian Chrøis =

Danish footballer (born 1959)

Personal information
- Date of birth: 12 November 1959 (age 66)
- Place of birth: Copenhagen, Denmark
- Position: Midfielder

Youth career
- Avarta

Senior career*
| Years | Team | Apps | (Gls) |
| 1976–1979 | Avarta | 71 | (?) |
| 1980–1984 | Brøndby | 161 | (65) |
| 1984–1985 | Granada | | |
| 1985–1987 | Bellinzona | | |
| 1987–1990 | Brøndby | 42 | (5) |
| 1990–1992 | Helsingør | | |

International career
| 1983 | Denmark u-21 | 1 | (0) |
| 1983–1984 | Denmark | 7 | (1) |

Managerial career
- 1992–1993: Helsingør IF
- 1993–1996: Frem Hellebæk IF
- 1996–1998: Taarbæk IF
- 2006–2007: Humlebæk BK
- 2008–2009: Allerød FK
- * Club domestic league appearances and goals

Brian Chrøis (born 12 November 1959) is a Danish former professional footballer who scored 68 goals in 239 games as a defensive midfielder for Danish club Brøndby IF. He scored a single goal in seven games for the Denmark national football team. Besides Denmark, Chrois has played in Switzerland and Spain.

== Biography ==
Born in Copenhagen, Chrøis started playing football with local team Boldklubben Avarta. He made his senior debut at Avarta, and established himself as a defensive midfielder with fine finishing. He was part of a team reaching consecutive promotions to the Copenhagen Series to the Denmark Series before reaching the then third-tier 3rd Division. He moved to Brøndby IF before the 1980 season, and was named 1980 "Brøndby Player of the Year". He helped the club win the 1981 2nd Division, and secure promotion to the top-flight Danish 1st Division. In 1981, before the 1982 season, he became the first fully professional player in Danish football, when Brøndby chairman Per Bjerregaard offered him a full-time contract. He was Brøndby's topscorer with 13 league goals in the 1983 season, and was called up for the Danish national team in May 1983, by national manager Sepp Piontek. He played seven games in Denmark's unsuccessful qualification campaign for the 1984 Summer Olympics, scoring a goal against Norway.

In 1984, he was offered an economically improved full-time contract by Brøndby's rival team Hvidovre IF, which he accepted. As Bjerregaard did not want his young midfielder moving to a rival club, he used a clause in Chrøis' contract, to sell him to a foreign club. Chrøis moved to Spanish club Granada CF in the secondary Segunda División league. He enjoyed life in Spain, but he was soon far from the Danish national team, and decided to move on after a year. This caused problems getting his wage from Granada, but with the intervention of Per Bjerregaard, FIFA got involved, and Chrøis received the approximately £25.000 the club had withheld.

He moved to Switzerland, to play for AC Bellinzona in the secondary Challenge League division. He helped the club win promotion for the top-flight Swiss Super League in 1986, before he decided to move back to Denmark in 1987. He rejoined Brøndby under manager Ebbe Skovdahl, and helped the club win the 1987 and 1988 Danish championships, as well as the 1989 Danish Cup. Brøndby hired new manager Morten Olsen in January 1990, and Chrøis was one of several older players who did not feature in Olsen's plans for the future. Chrøis moved to lower league club Helsingør IF, alongside Brøndby players Erik Rasmussen and Ole Østergaard. He played one and a half year at the club, before an achilles tendon injury forced him to retire in 1992. He went on to coach Helsingør alongside Birger Peitersen, and coached a number of smaller Danish teams before leaving football in 1998. He later returned to football and coached Humlebæk BK and Allerød FK.

== Honours ==
- Brøndby Player of the Year: 1980
- Danish Championships: 1987 and 1988
- Danish Cup: 1989

== Sources ==
- Mads Rømert, "Fuldtidsproffen: Chrøis var første prof i Brøndby", Jyllands-Posten, September 4, 2000
- Brian Chrøis national team profile at the Danish Football Association (in Danish)
