= Ruben Bagger =

Danish footballer (born 1972)

Personal information
- Date of birth: 16 January 1972 (age 54)
- Place of birth: Svogerslev, Denmark
- Positions: Winger; forward

Youth career
- Svogerslev Boldklub
- Jyllinge GIF
- Roskilde Boldklub 1906

Senior career*
Years	Team	Apps	(Gls)
1993–2007	Brøndby IF	243	(64)
- * Club domestic league appearances and goals

Ruben Bagger (born 16 January 1972) is a Danish former footballer who spent his entire professional career for Brøndby in the Danish Superliga, and played more than 300 matches for the club. He won five Danish Superliga championships and three Danish Cup trophies with Brøndby. Bagger played in the position of left winger or forward.

== Biography ==
Bagger started playing amateur football with Danish clubs Svogerslev Boldklub and Jyllinge GIF, and made his senior debut with Roskilde Boldklub 1906. He was spotted by Brøndby coach Tom Køhlert, and moved to Brøndby IF in the summer 1993. He became a part of the senior team under Brøndby manager Ebbe Skovdahl, and made his debut on 13 November 1993, when he came on as a substitute in the 1-0 win against Ikast fS. Bagger signed a fully professional two-year contract with Brøndby from July 1994, and went on to compete with a host of Danish international forwards for a place in the Brøndby team. He initially competed with Bo Hansen, for a place in the starting line-up alongside Mark Strudal. When Strudal left the club in July 1995, Bagger saw renewed competition from forwards Peter Møller and Ebbe Sand.

From 1996 to 1998, Bagger was a part of a Brøndby team which won three Danish Superliga championships in a row, as well as the 1998 Danish Cup. In the European competitions, Bagger first made his mark, when he scored twice in the games against German team Karlsruher SC in the 1996-97 UEFA Cup. Brøndby were trailing 0-3 in the first game against Karlsruher SC, when Bagger reduced to 1-3 in the dying moments of the game. When the two teams met two weeks later, Bagger opened the score in a game which Brøndby won 5-0, beating Karlsruher SC 6-3 on aggregate. He also took part in Brøndby's 1998-99 UEFA Champions League campaign. Bagger set a Brøndby scoring record of 12 goals in 51 European games.

His best season came, when he scored 13 goals to help Brøndby win the 2001-02 Superliga championship. Under new manager Michael Laudrup, Bagger saw less playing time. From 2003, he was plagued by lesser or larger injuries, though he emerged to score in the 2003 Danish Cup final against FC Midtjylland as Brøndby won 3-0. He also played the 2005 Danish Cup final, and scored the winning goal as Brøndby beat FC Midtjylland 3-2 in extra time. Bagger retired in December 2007. He played a combined total of 338 games and scored 88 goals for Brøndby, including 243 games and 64 goals in the Superliga championship, making him the second most scoring Brøndby player in the Superliga following Ebbe Sand.

== Honours ==
- Danish Superliga (5): 1995-96, 1996-97, 1997-98, 2001-02, 2004-05
- Danish Cup: 1998, 2003 and 2005
