= Per Nielsen =

Danish footballer (born 1973)

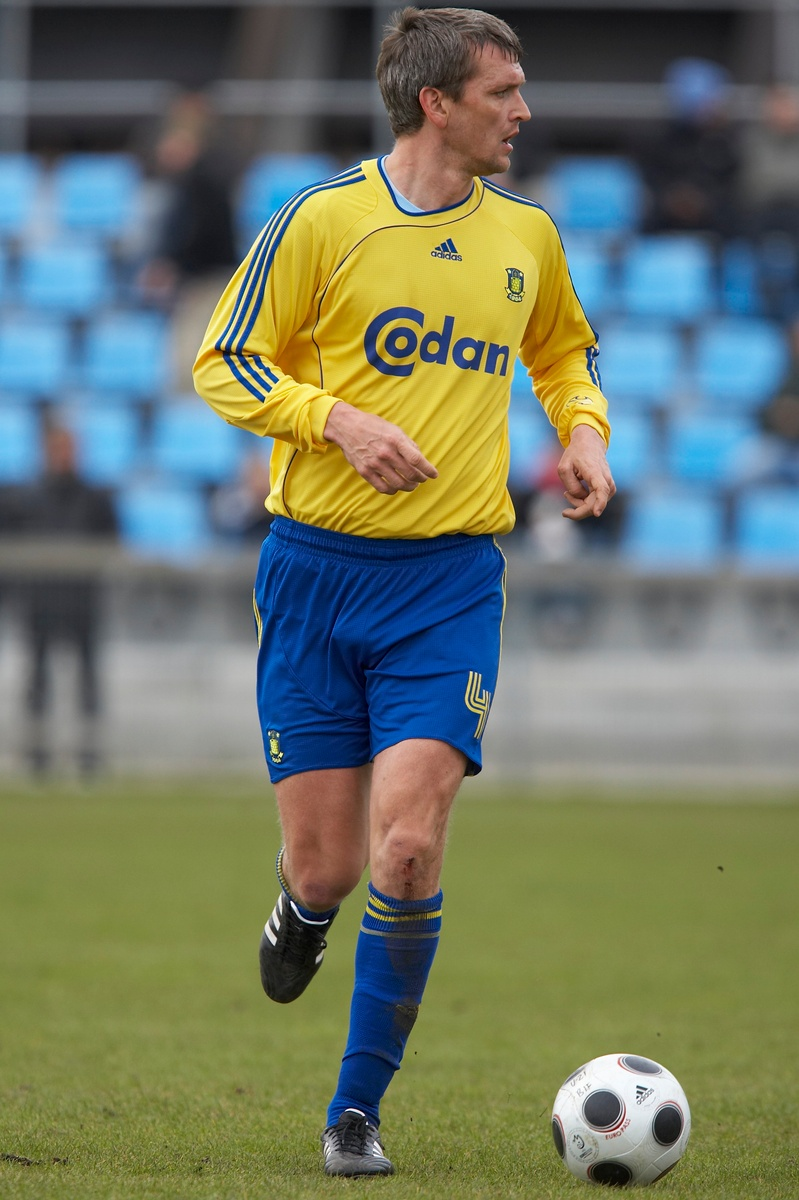

Personal information
- Full name: Per Lundgren Nielsen
- Date of birth: 15 October 1973 (age 53)
- Place of birth: Århus, Denmark
- Height: 1.91 m (6 ft 3 in)
- Position: Defender

Youth career
- 1979–1993: Brøndby IF

Senior career*
Years	Team	Apps	(Gls)
1993–2008	Brøndby IF	394	(23)

International career
1993	Denmark U-19	1	(0)
1994–1996	Denmark U-21	19	(2)
2002–2006	Denmark	10	(0)

Managerial career
- 2008–2010: Brøndby IF (youth)
- 2011–2014: Hvidovre IF
- 2015–2024: Brøndby IF (women)
- * Club domestic league appearances and goals

Per Lundgren Nielsen (Danish pronunciation: [ˈpʰɛɐ̯ ˈne̝lsn̩]; born 15 October 1973) is a Danish former professional footballer who played in the central defense of Brøndby IF in the Danish Superliga for his entire club career. With Brøndby, Nielsen won five Danish championships and three Danish Cups since his senior debut in 1993. He played 547 official games for Brøndby IF and scored 26 goals, and from 2002 to 2008 he was named team captain. He played 10 matches for the Denmark national football team and is noted for 19 matches for the national under-21 team from 1994 to 1996. Following his retirement, he has worked as first as an assistant coach, later as head coach. He coached Brøndby's women's team from 2015 to 2024.

== Club career ==
Born in Århus, Nielsen's parents moved to Brøndby when he was a child, and he enrolled at Brøndby IF at the age of five. Nielsen made his senior debut in the Brøndby IF jersey on 26 June 1993, and debuted in the Danish Superliga championship in March 1995. Nielsen was touted as the long-term successor of central defender Uche Okechukwu and was permanently moved into the senior squad in December 1993, coming from a Brøndby youth team that included several future first team regulars, including Kim Daugaard, Allan Ravn and later Danish national team player Ebbe Sand.

Nielsen became a mainstay in the team during the 1995–96 Superliga season, as Brøndby won the Danish championship, and established himself as a regular starter. He helped Brøndby repeat the Superliga win in the 1996–97 Superliga and the Double of both Superliga championship and Danish Cup title in 1998. Following the 2001–02 Superliga championship triumph with Brøndby, Danish international goalkeeper Mogens Krogh retired, and Nielsen was chosen as new team captain. After his second Danish Cup triumph in 2003, Nielsen was elected the 2003 Brøndby IF Player of the Year.

In 2004, the Danish football players' association announced a strike action. Brøndby was still in European competition, and would be forced to field a team consisting of retired Brøndby professionals, youth team players and recent signings who had yet to become members of the players' association, in the August 2004 UEFA Cup qualification re-match against FK Ventspils. Two days before the match, Nielsen and teammate Dan Anton Johansen broke the strike and returned to the Brøndby training, causing a lot of controversy in the process. The day after, the players' and football clubs' associations reached a provisorical agreement, and Brøndby's first team players were selected for the match, though they were eliminated on aggregate.

He captained Brøndby to the Double of the 2004–05 Superliga and Danish Cup titles, and was named 2006 Brøndby IF Player of the Year. In February 2008, Nielsen chose to resign from the position of team captain, stating that he would spend his remaining one and a half years at Brøndby helping the club move on, also if that meant him taking a place on the bench. Stefán Gíslason was named his successor. Nielsen helped Brøndby win the 2008 Danish Cup, his last trophy with the team. Nielsen announced that he would retire as an active footballer in late June 2008. Instead he will continue as a scout in Brøndby. His last game in the blue and yellow jersey was his testimonial match against Spanish team Deportivo La Coruna on 12 July 2008. Nielsen played a total 547 games in all competitions, including 394 games and scored 23 goals for Brøndby in the Superliga.

== Coaching career ==
Following three years Brondby IF youth coach, he spent four years as Hvidovre IF head coach. In 2015, he took over as coach for Danish women's champions Brondby IF. In April 2019 Per Nielsen prolonged his contract with Brondby IF so that he would stay with the team until 2021. The team won the championship in 2019.

== International career ==
Nielsen's first international game was a single under-19 national team match in December 1993. He was called up to play for the Danish national under-21 team in March 1994, and went on to play 19 games and score two goals for the under-21 national team until July 1996.

Despite winning several trophies with Brøndby, Nielsen never broke into the Danish national team, but he was selected to play for the league national team, consisting of the best players from the domestic Danish Superliga championship. He went on his first trip with the league national team in 1997, playing three games at the US Cup in California, United States. He likewise took part in the league national team campaign in Colombia, Ecuador and Venezuela in 1999, with injuries forcing him out of the 1998 tour. Nielsen was once again included in the Danish league national team's trip to California in 2004, where he made his 10th and last appearance for the team, with injuries forcing him out of the 2003 tour. In January 2006, Nielsen was called up for his sixth trip with the Danish league national team. However, he chose not to travel with the team to the Carlsberg Cup in Hong Kong, citing personal reasons, which national team coach Morten Olsen fully supported.

Nielsen finally debuted for the Danish national team in September 2002 as a late substitute, and he would go on to be among the fringe players of the Danish squad. He played a total 10 national team games until November 2006, helping Denmark qualify for the 2004 European Championship.

== Honours ==
=== Player ===
- Danish Superliga: 1995–96, 1996–97, 1997–98, 2001–02, 2004–05
- Danish Cup: 1997–98, 2002–03, 2004–05, 2007–08
- Brøndby IF Player of the Year: 2003, 2006

=== Manager ===
- Danish Women League: 2015, 2017, 2019
