= Bjarne Jensen (footballer) =

Danish footballer (born 1959)

Personal information
- Full name: Bjarne Jensen
- Date of birth: 16 April 1959 (age 67)
- Place of birth: Brøndby, Denmark
- Position: Defender

Youth career
- 1968–1978: Brøndby

Senior career*
Years	Team	Apps	(Gls)
1978–1992	Brøndby	402	(22)

International career
1988–1989	Denmark	4	(0)

Managerial career
- 1995–1998: Virum-Sorgenfri
- 2000–2001: Brønshøj
- 2005–2006: Allerød
- 2007: Hvidovre
- 2008–2009: Herlev
- 2009–2010: Elite 3000 Helsingør
- 2010: Brøndby IF (assistant)
- * Club domestic league appearances and goals

Bjarne Jensen (Danish pronunciation: [ˈpjɑːnə ˈjensn̩]; born 16 April 1959) is a Danish former footballer who played as a defender. Jensen continues to hold the record of most appearances for Brøndby IF with 556, of which 402 were in the Danish leagues. He continued as a manager after his playing career.

== Club career ==
Jensen spent all 14 seasons of his playing career with Brøndby IF before retiring at age 33 in 1992. From his senior debut in 1978, where the club competed in the 2nd Division (second-tier) until his retirement, Jensen won 5 Danish championships and 1 Danish Cup. He won the award of Brøndby Player of the Year twice; in 1984 and 1988, while also winning Danish Player of the Year in the latter. Jensen played his final Brøndby game in November 1992, before ending his career. He still holds Brøndby IF's record of most appearances with 556 senior games, in which he scored 32 goals.

== International career ==
Jensen gained four caps for the Denmark national team, in which he scored no goals.

== Honours ==
Brøndby

- 1st Division^{(I)}: 1985, 1987, 1988, 1990, 1991
- 2nd Division^{(II)}: 1981
- Danish Cup: 1988–89
- Danish League Cup^{(C)}: 1984
