= Aurelijus Skarbalius =

Lithuanian footballer and manager (born 1973)

Auri Skarbalius
Personal information
- Full name: Aurelijus Skarbalius
- Date of birth: 12 May 1973 (age 53)
- Place of birth: Vilnius, Lithuanian SSR, Soviet Union
- Height: 1.76 m (5 ft 9 in)
- Position: Full-back

Team information
- Current team: HB Køge (sporting director)

Youth career
- Žalgiris Vilnius

Senior career*
Years	Team	Apps	(Gls)
1992–1994	Žalgiris Vilnius	43	(6)
1994–1995	Inkaras Kaunas	27	(4)
1995–2005	Brøndby	194	(2)
2005	→ Herfølge (loan)	8	(0)
2006–2008	Herfølge	39	(0)
Total		311	(12)

International career
1991–2005	Lithuania	65	(5)

Managerial career
- 2006–2009: Herfølge
- 2009–2011: HB Køge
- 2011–2013: Brøndby
- 2013: Haslev FC
- 2014–2015: Viborg FF
- 2015–2016: Brøndby IF U19
- 2016: Brøndby (caretaker)
- 2016: Brøndby IF U19
- 2017–2018: Žalgiris Vilnius
- 2018–2019: FK Trakai
- 2020–2021: HB Køge
- 2021–2024: HB Køge (technical director)
- 2024–: HB Køge (sporting director)
- * Club domestic league appearances and goals

Aurelijus Skarbalius (Danish pronunciation: [ˈɑwʁi]; born 12 May 1973) is a Lithuanian professional football manager and former player, who started his career as a winger, but played mostly as either left- or right-sided full-back. He is the Global Director of Capelli Sport, the owner of his former club HB Køge.

== Club career ==
Auri started his career in Lithuanian clubs Žalgiris Vilnius and Inkaras Kaunas, before he was bought by Danish Superliga club Brøndby IF for $150,000 in 1995, after he and Inkaras met Brøndby in the 1995 UEFA Cup. At Brøndby he immediately won silverware, as the club won three Danish championships in a row in the 1995–96, 1996–97, and 1997–98 seasons. Despite only playing 17 games over the three championship winning seasons, Auri earned himself a cult following in the stands during his early years at Brøndby, as he did not succeed in scoring any goals for the club. Apart from this, he was well liked for his high work ethics and team spirit.

He was a part of Brøndby's first stint in the 1998–99 UEFA Champions League main tournament, with the job to mark David Beckham of Manchester United and Luís Figo of FC Barcelona. Skarbalius got his big breakthrough in the 2000–01 season, playing 28 of 33 games in the Superliga, and in the championship winning season of 2001–02 he scored his only two goals for Brøndby, one in the Superliga, and one in the UEFA Champions League qualification against Dinamo Tirana. Incidentally Skarbalius was voted Brøndby's Player of the year 2002 that season.

Following the summer 2002 arrival of new manager Michael Laudrup, new player Asbjørn Sennels was bought for the left side of the defence in the following December. Sennels was a part of the Denmark national team at the time, and even though Sennels initially didn't find his feet at the club, Auri played the rest of the season as a substitute for the left and right side of the defence. Auri spent the next few years mainly on the bench in Brøndby, and for the last half of the 2004–05 season he was put on loan at Superliga relegation battlers Herfølge Boldklub. Herfølge ended the season with relegation, and Auri returned to Brøndby to collect his 5th Danish championship title for Brøndby, for the games he played in the first half of the season.

For the first half of the 2005–06 season Skarbalius only took part in three matches for a combined 72 minutes on the pitch, and his contract was mutually terminated of 31 December 2005 to allow Auri to become a playing assistant coach at Herfølge in the Danish 1st Division. Before leaving Brøndby he managed to become the most capped foreign player in the club's history with almost 200 appearances.

== International career ==
Skarbalius is a former captain of the Lithuania national team, and he previously held the record number of appearances for Lithuania with 65 international caps, during which he has scored five goals. He retired from international football in October 2005 after spending all 14 years with the national team since Lithuania gained independence.

== Coaching career ==
In November 2006, he was promoted to head coach of the Herfølge BK. When Herfølge in 2009 merged with Køge Boldklub, Skarbalius continued as manager of the new club called HB Køge. On 8 June 2011, it was announced, that Auri would be taking the job as assistant manager for Henrik Jensen at his former club Brøndby IF starting in January 2012, but when Jensen was sacked on 24 October, Auri was appointed as caretaker manager for the remainder of 2011.

In October 2012, with Brøndby last in the 2012–13 Superliga table, Skarbalius was expected to be sacked soon, according to Danish bookmakers. However, he remained as head coach for the remainder of the season and on 20 May 2013 a new Superliga contract was secured in the last game away to Horsens. A new club board sacked him and sports director Ole Bjur on 10 June 2013 and Auri was replaced by Thomas Frank.

In September 2013, he was announced as manager of minor Danish club Haslev FC. He managed Haslev until Christmas 2013, and in February 2014 he was announced as the replacement for the knee injured Ove Christensen at Viborg FF. Skarbalius could not save the club from relegation, but in the following season he helped the team to promote to the Danish Superliga once again. However, following the promotion he left the club by mutual consent.

In the autumn of 2015 Skarbalius became youth coach at Brøndby IF. When Brøndby-manager Thomas Frank resigned in March 2016 following criticism from the chairman, Skarbalius was once again made manager of the club.

On 27 November 2017, it was announced that Skarbalius has signed a contract to become head coach of his first club Žalgiris Vilnius. He was sacked on 22 June 2018.

In December 2018, Auri became head coach of FK Trakai. After 2019–20 UEFA Europa League first qualifying round, when the club had changed its name to FK Riteriai in the meantime, and had struggled against KÍ Klaksvík, he left the club team.

On 5 December 2019, it was announced that Skarbalius would return as manager of HB Køge on 1 January 2020. In March 2021, the club confirmed that Skarbalius would be the club's Technical Director from the coming season. Three years later, in June 2024, Skarbalius became the club's Sports Director.

== Career statistics ==
Scores and results list Lithuania's goal tally first, score column indicates score after each Skarbalius goal.

List of international goals scored by Aurelijus Skarbalius
No.	Date	Venue	Opponent	Score	Result	Competition
1	17 November 1991	Kretinga City Stadium, Kretinga, Lithuania	Latvia	1–1	1–1	1991 Baltic Cup
2	17 August 1994	Eyravallen, Örebro, Sweden	Sweden	2–3	2–4	Friendly
3	7 September 1994	Republican Stadium, Kyiv, Ukraine	Ukraine	2–0	2–0	UEFA Euro 1996 qualification
4	20 May 1995	Daugava Stadium, Riga, Latvia	Estonia	1–0	7–0	1995 Baltic Cup
5	29 July 1995	Žalgiris Stadium, Vilnius, Lithuania	Belarus	1–0	1–1	Friendly

== Managerial statistics ==
As of 26 May 2021

Team	Nat	From	To	Record				
Team	Nat	From	To	G	W	D	L	Win %
Herfølge Boldklub	Denmark	1 January 2006	30 June 2009	90	49	18	23	54.44
HB Køge	Denmark	1 July 2009	24 November 2011	82	28	13	41	34.15
Brøndby IF	Denmark	25 November 2011	10 June 2013	59	18	19	22	30.51
Haslev FC	Denmark	20 September 2013	3 November 2013	8	5	3	0	62.50
Viborg FF	Denmark	10 February 2014	6 June 2015	49	18	18	13	36.73
Brøndby IF	Denmark	9 March 2016	30 May 2016	15	7	2	6	46.67
Žalgiris Vilnius	Lithuania	27 November 2017	22 June 2018	11	5	4	2	45.45
FK Trakai	Lithuania	21 December 2018	18 July 2019	19	8	7	4	42.11
HB Køge	Denmark	1 January 2020	31 May 2021	50	14	13	23	28.00
Total				383	152	97	134	39.69

== Honours ==
Žalgiris Vilnius

- Baltic Cup: 1991
- Lithuanian Championship: 1991, 1992
- Lithuanian Cup: 1993, 1994

Inkaras Kaunas

- Lithuanian Championship: 1995
- Lithuanian Cup: 1995

Brøndby

- Danish Superliga: 1995–96, 1996–97, 1997–98, 2001–02, 2004–05
- Danish Cup: 1997–98, 2002–03, 2004–05

Individual

- Brøndby IF Player of the year: 2002
- A Lyga Coach of the Month: May 2018
