= John Sinding =

Danish footballer and manager (born 1941)

Personal information
- Full name: John Sinding
- Date of birth: 16 May 1941 (age 85)
- Place of birth: Denmark
- Position: Goalkeeper

Youth career
- Skovshoved

Senior career*
Years	Team	Apps	(Gls)
19??–19??	Vordingborg IF		
19??–19??	Glostrup IC		
19??–19??	Skovshoved		

Managerial career
- 196?–1968: Glostrup IC
- 1970–1972: Brøndby
- 1972–1974: Ballerup
- 1975: Brøndby
- 1977: Skovshoved
- 1977–1979: B.93
- 1979–1983: Hvidovre
- 1983–1984: Glostrup IC
- 1984–1985: Hvidovre
- 1988–1990: Fremad Amager
- 1991–1992: Skovshoved
- 1993: RB 1906
- 2002: Hvidovre
- * Club domestic league appearances and goals

John Sinding (Danish pronunciation: [ˈtjʌn ˈse̝nte̝ŋ]; born 16 May 1941) is a Danish former football manager and player.

As a footballer, he appeared for Vordingborg IF and Glostrup IC in the lower-tier local divisions and for Skovshoved IF in the higher divisions. After retiring as a player, Sinding decided to continue as a coach and in a span of 25 years he was employed as head coach, youth coach, goalkeeping coach and manager of 10 different Danish football clubs. The culmination of his coaching career took place in the early 1980s, when he led Hvidovre IF to a Danish Cup win in the 1979–80 season – the club's first cup title. He subsequently helped secure the club's third Danish championship in the 1981 season.

Outside football, Sinding has been director and owner of the company W. Johansen ApS.

== Playing career ==
Sinding's playing career began in the youth department at Skovshoved IF. In his active playing career as a senior player, he represented Vordingborg IF, Glostrup IC and his childhood club Skovshoved IF in the 1960s. There, he appeared both in the lower tier local divisions for Glostrup and Vordingborg, as well as in the higher divisions for Skovshoved.

== Managerial career ==
=== Beginnings ===
Sinding began his coaching career in Glostrup IC. In 1968, Sinding was hired as the new coach in the youth department of Brøndby IF, which was then a lower tier club. Under his management the club's U17 team were promoted to the highest division in 1969, where they ended up in fourth place in the table in their first season. Sinding remained in the position as youth coach at the club for a year and a half.

=== 1970–1978: Brøndby ===
At the young age of 29, Sinding became head coach of Brøndby's senior team in 1970, which competed in the local divisions under the Zealand FA (SBU). He initially only planned to coach the team for one season, which thus became his first season as a senior coach. After the complete merger of the largest sports clubs in Brøndbyøster and Brøndbyvester in 1964 – which resulted in the formation of Brøndby IF – the board of the club from Vestegnen decided that the new football club should aim to compete at a higher level. The first team's final position in the league standings – 10th place in the Sjællandsserien (Zealand Series) – in the 1969 season had been deemed unsatisfactory, and the collaboration with the then head coach Ib Jensen was discontinued and a major overhaul of the first-team squad was made. With his new appointment, Sinding thus set the goal of assembling an almost completely new first team and lead the team to promotion from the Zealand Series, ensuring the club a place in Danmarksserien (Denmark Series) by 1971. The goal was finally fulfilled when Brøndby managed to win in the last matchday of the season which secured the Zealand Series title in the 1971 season which meant automatic promotion to the Denmark Series in 1972 with a squad consisting of players such as Per Bjerregaard, Tom Køhlert and Ebbe Skovdahl, who would all go on to become key figures in the club afterwards. This achievement marked the club's second promotion since its foundation where it had been incepted in the Serie 1, the sixth tier of the Danish football league system. In the following season, however, the club's board chose to appoint Mogens Johansen as new head coach and shortly afterwards, former professional player Finn Laudrup took over as player-coach for the first team.

After his first stint at Brøndby IF, Sinding continued as head coach of Ballerup IF in the period 1972–1974. There, he led the team from the Denmark Series to the third highest tier (3rd Division East under the former league structure) in 1974, which was the first time this occurred in the club's history. The team, which in the 1972 season had just missed out on promotion by a single point, won its Denmark Series group by beating Brøndby IF in the decisive match, after which they won the whole division after beating Viborg FF 1–0 in the divisional finals. Sinding returned to the position of head coach at Brøndby IF in 1975 to coach the newly promoted 3rd Division team. The goal from the board's side was this time position in the top six and a continuation of the club's attacking style of play. Sinding's stay at the club this time lasted two seasons, and ended short of the desired promotion.

After leaving Brøndby again, Sinding held head coaching positions at Skovshoved IF and the 1st Division (first-tier) club B.93, where he was hired as a new coach to replace the outgoing Erik Gynild. Sinding coached the side for a total of 80 matches (26 wins, 19 draws and 35 losses) between 1977–1979 and for a short period in the 1977 season he also coached the club's 2nd senior team in the Denmark Series together with player-coach Erling Bøje. At the halfway point of the 1979 season, after two years at B.93 with 13th place and 7th place finishes, respectively, the board of the club decided to dismiss Sinding due to the first team's relegation battle. The team had at that point lost six games in a row and bottom of the 1st Division, after which Bøje took over as head coach for the remaining 15 matches of the season and managed to heed the club from relegation, which was secured in the penultimate matchday against Slagelse B&I.

=== 1979–1987: Hvidovre ===
Subsequently, in 1979, he became head coach of Hvidovre IF, whom he led to the 1979–80 final of the Danish Cup, which the team won after a 5–3 win over Lyngby Boldklub in Københavns Idrætspark. The cup win secured Hvidovre IF qualification for the European Cup Winners' Cup in the 1980–81 season, where the team defeated Icelandic club Fram Reykjavík in the first round, but then suffered a defeat over two legs in the second round against Dutch side Feyenoord. In the 1981 season, the team also became Danish champions for the third time – a single point ahead of Lyngby Boldklub in second place. He stepped back as head coach of Hvidovre IF at around the same time as Michael Manniche moved to Portuguese club Benfica from Hvidovre in the summer of 1983. On his favorite coach, Manniche stated:

John could both be comfortable to be around and crude. But in the right way. He could motivate people. There are many "school teachers" in Danish football, but no one is going to make me say that there are too many. My mentality is just more aligned with John Sinding's values.

After a short period as head coach of Glostrup IC who competed in the 2nd Division (second-tier), he returned to Hvidovre in the position of manager responsible for tactics, team selection, handling contract negotiations, outreach work and collaboration with the youth department around talent work, whereas Hvidovre's former coach Kurt Stendahl continued as responsible for day-to-day training. This was also taken care of by Sinding himself later on. In October 1985, just over a year after his re-employment at Hvidovre, Sinding was sacked after first-team players threatened the management with a major player flight if Sinding stayed on as manager. Sinding reacted to the dismissal by launching a lawsuit at the Østre Landsret (High Court) against Hvidovre IF with a compensation claim of DKK 350,000 for unjustified dismissal instead of trying to find a settlement. Hvidovre IF suffered relegation from the top tier after the 1985 season.

=== 1988–1994: Lower leagues ===
Prior to the 1988 season, Sinding moved to newly promoted 2nd Division (second-tier) club Fremad Amager on a three-year contract. Four months before his contract expired, the board decided to dismiss Sinding with immediate notice on 18 August 1990, which was justified with "a lack of tactical abilities" – despite the team going through an undefeated stretch of eleven matches. After the 1990 season, the team relegated to the Danish 2nd Division (third-tier), (Note: Founded in 1991, the Danish Superliga replaced the 1st Division as the highest league of football in Denmark. This meant that the 2nd Division had become the new third-tier. Source: "Superligaens historie". www.superstats.dk.) and his replacement as head coach, who had already been introduced two months before Sinding's dismissal, was former Fremad player Tonni Nielsen. The dismissal of Sinding caused the chairman of Fremad Amager's professional department, Henning Bjerre, to resign the following day due to his dissatisfaction with the circumstances behind the decision to dismiss, which had been made by the three other board members.

In the autumn of 1991, Sinding took over as the new head coach of Skovshoved IF, competing in the 2nd Division East (third-tier), for the remaining three matches in the competition. The club had requested his assistance after firing former head coach Leif Staun the week before. Sinding, however, could not prevent the relegation of his childhood club.

On 1 July 1993, Sinding was appointed the new head coach of 2nd Division club RB 1906 on a six-month contract. He replaced the outgoing Benny Jensen, who had resigned during the summer break, as he had felt that he could no longer implement his ideas, and had, as a result, moved to Vanløse IF instead. RB 1906, who had lost half of their players from the spring season, ended the autumn season in 1993 in the penultimate place in the 2nd Division East, which meant relegation to the Denmark Series after 18 seasons as a club in the top three divisions. In the spring of 1994, Sinding was replaced by RB 1906's new head coach Carsten Broe, who held the position of head coach for four years.

=== 1994–2008: Later career ===
In September 1996, then-head coach Kim Brink picked up Sinding at short notice to become a substitute goalkeeper coach for F.C. Copenhagen to train the club's two goalkeepers, Karim Zaza and Finnish international Antti Niemi. This was because the club's regular goalkeeping coach, former Danish international Ole Qvist, was at a four-week holiday in the United States.

After two-and-a-half years, Peter Schmeichel ended his involvement in the 1st Division (second-tier) club Hvidovre IF's professional department, Hvidovre Fodbold A/S, on 30 June 2002, whereupon the club was left with no capital (Schmeichel had made sure that the club had no more outstanding debt) or a coach, after the former manager Jan Sørensen's departure during the summer 2002. Since the club had to start all over again with no finances and a new squad mainly consisting of lower tier players, their management therefore contacted Sinding and persuaded him to take over as the manager of the team in the autumn season of 2002 in an unpaid / volunteering managerial role with Sten Ziegler as the one responsible for the day-to-day practice. The goal was to stabilize Hvidovre IF's first team in the second-tier and avoid relegation as well as securing a much-needed financial respite. During the winter break of the 2002–03 season, the club's management dismissed Sinding, in order for new head coach Jan Christensen, coming over from fourth-tier club Gladsaxe-Hero Boldklub, to take over the position as of 1 January 2003.

In January 2008, Brøndby IF briefly engaged John Sinding again, in a position as "talent scout", and in this connection he was sent to Brazil to keep an eye out for attacking-oriented youth players for the youth academy together with the former goalkeeping coach Jørgen Henriksen.

== Outside football ==
Alongside his football career, Sinding, who became self-employed in 1980 after 12 years at offshore supplier Semco, has been director and owner of a private installation company, W. Johansen ApS. A company of more than 33 employees located in Brønshøj, W. Johansen ApS specializes in ventilation, air conditioning and electrical installation. Sinding took over the company in January 1979 and subsequently co-founded W. Ventilation ApS in January 1981 and W. Johansen EL in February 1984, respectively. Since then, Sinding has divested his shares in the company.

== Honours ==
Brøndby

- Zealand Series^{(V)}: 1971

Ballerup

- Denmark Series^{(IV)}: 1973

Hvidovre

- 1st Division^{(I)}: 1981
- Danish Cup: 1979–80
