= Mark Howard (footballer, born January 1986) =

English footballer (born 1986)

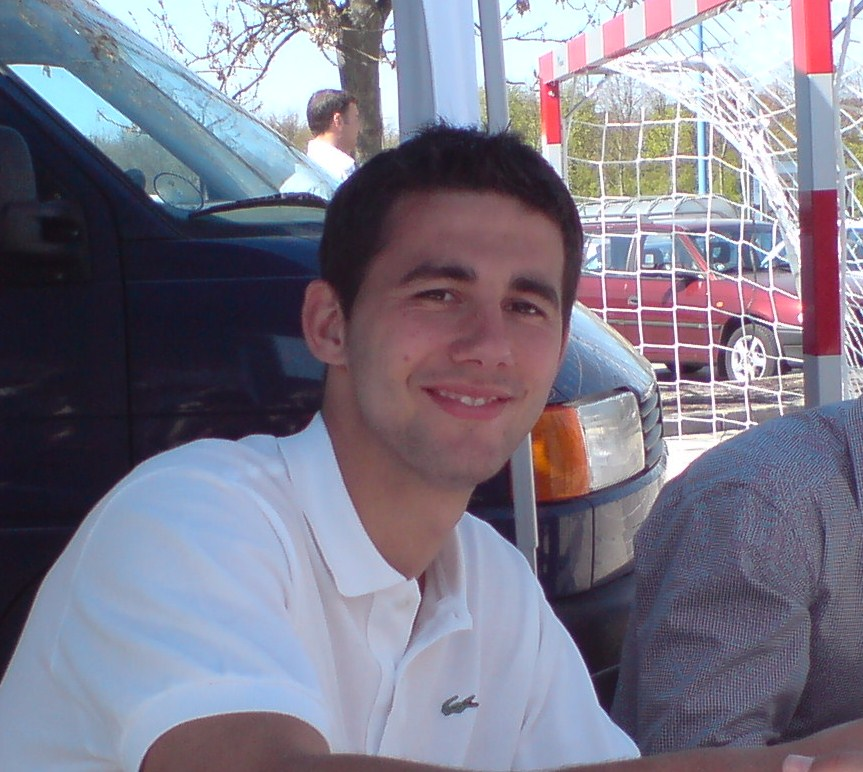
- Howard with Brøndby IF in May 2007

Personal information
- Date of birth: 29 January 1986 (age 40)
- Place of birth: Salford, England
- Position: Centre-back

Team information
- Current team: Oklahoma City Energy (assistant coach)

Youth career
- Barr Hill Lads Club
- ?–2004: Manchester United

Senior career*
Years	Team	Apps	(Gls)
2004–2006	Manchester United	0	(0)
2006–2008	Brøndby	67	(1)
2009–2012	AGF	51	(2)
2014	Oklahoma City Energy	19	(1)
Total		137	(4)
- * Club domestic league appearances and goals

Mark James Howard (born 29 January 1986) is an English football coach and former player. He works as an assistant coach for American club Oklahoma City Energy, for whom he played for a season before retiring from playing.

== Career ==
Born in Salford, Greater Manchester, Howard attended Hope High School, Salford, with fellow Manchester United players Phil Bardsley and Mark Redshaw. Howard began his career playing for the Barr Hill Lads Club in Salford. He signed for Manchester United as a junior player, and played a number of years in the youth and reserve teams of the club. Having failed to make an impact in the first team, Howard was amongst seven United players given a free transfer at the end of the 2005–06 season.

Howard moved to Danish Superliga runners-up Brøndby IF, that had recently hired Manchester United reserve team coach René Meulensteen as manager. Howard participated in training sessions and played a friendly match against German team 1. FC Nürnberg, before signing a three-year contract with Brøndby on 28 July 2006. He made his senior debut for Brøndby in August 2006, and played 13 of 18 league games as Brøndby finished in seventh place after the first half of the 2006–07 Superliga season.

When Meulensteen left the club in January 2007, new manager Tom Køhlert brought in Danish defender Mikkel Bischoff in contention for Howard's place in the central defence. When Bischoff suffered an injury, Howard proved himself once again and continued in the starting 11 for the rest of the season. He was also a part of the Brøndby team which won the 2006–07 Royal League cup on 15 March 2007. In the final match of the cup, Howard received a penalty kick, which Martin Ericsson converted to a goal, securing Brøndby a 1–0 win over F.C. Copenhagen.

Having secured his place in the starting eleven during the first half of the 2007–08 season, Howard was awarded the player of the year in Brøndby on 1 December 2007. On 10 December 2008, he signed a three-and-a-half-year contract with AGF.

Howard signed with the Oklahoma City Energy on 11 March 2014 for an undisclosed amount until the end of the year. On 29 June 2014, he scored his first goal in America and was named in the team of the week for his performances

== Honours ==
=== Club ===
- Danish Cup: 2007–08
- Royal League: 2007

=== Individual ===
- Brøndby Player of the Year: 2007
