= Carsten V. Jensen =

Danish football executive (born 1963)

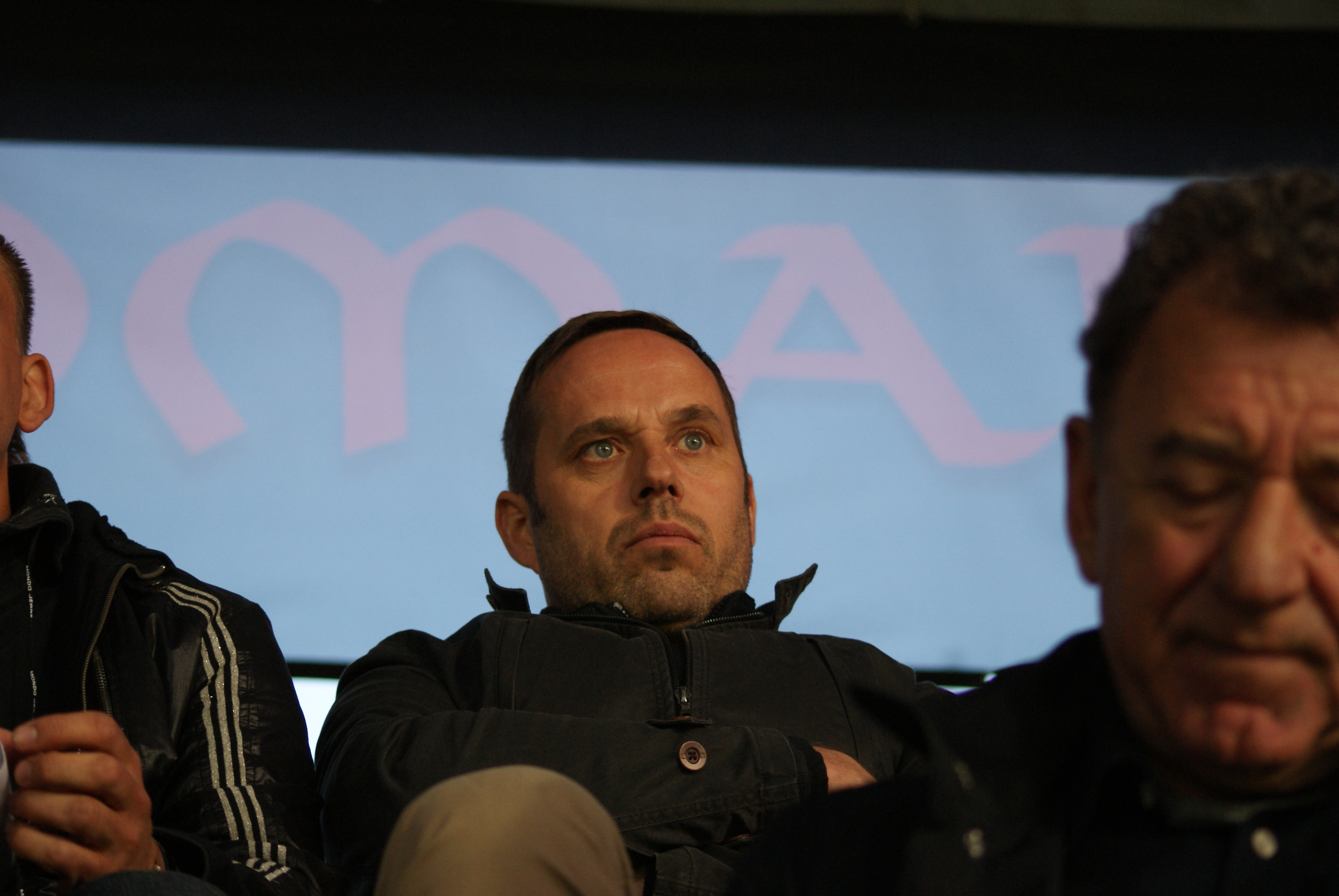
- Jensen in 2011

Personal information
- Full name: Carsten Vagn Jensen
- Date of birth: 28 February 1963 (age 63)
- Place of birth: Copenhagen, Denmark
- Height: 1.83 m (6 ft 0 in)
- Position: Midfielder

Senior career*
Years	Team	Apps	(Gls)
1978–1986	Næstved	7	(0)
1987–1989	Herfølge	29	(0)
1989–1989	B 1903	29	(0)
1990–1991	Brøndby	34	(1)
1991–1993	Næstved	49	(6)
1993–1998	Copenhagen	113	(4)

Managerial career
- 2000–2005: Copenhagen (assistant)
- 2012: Copenhagen
- * Club domestic league appearances and goals

Carsten Vagn Jensen (Danish pronunciation: [ˈkʰɑːstn̩ ˈvɑwˀn ˈjensn̩]; born 28 February 1963), colloquially known as Carsten V. Jensen or simply CV, is a Danish former footballer and coach, who was most recently the director of football of Brøndby IF.

== Career ==
He started his career with Næstved IF in 1983. He went on to play for Herfølge BK and B 1903. He moved to Brøndby IF, where he won the 1990 and 1991 Danish championships. When Jensen wasn't selected by Brøndby IF manager Morten Olsen for the 1991 UEFA Europa League semi-finals against Italian club AS Roma, the disappointed Jensen moved back to Næstved IF. In 1993, he was brought to F.C. Copenhagen, Brøndby IF's local rivals. F.C. Copenhagen reached the 1995 Danish Cup final, where Jensen was named man of the match as the club won 5–0 against Akademisk Boldklub. He ended his career in 1998, after a combined 138 games and five goals for F.C. Copenhagen.

In 2006, he left his job as assistant coach in F.C. Copenhagen, to replace Niels-Christian Holmstrøm as head of sports in the club.

In January 2012, he replaced F.C. Copenhagen's head coach Roland Nilsson, who was fired earlier the same day. He will continue functioning as director of football, as well. On 25 May 2012 after he failed to secure the 2011–12 Danish Championship, it was announced that he would step down as manager and continue only as Director of Football.

On 28 April 2014, Jensen was fired as director of football in F.C. Copenhagen after declining results for the team.

In June 2015, Jensen was appointed sporting director at FC Nordsjælland. He left the job in July 2019, to become executive director of football at Brøndby IF. He left the club by mutual consent on 8 October 2024, after five years in the role, during which Brøndby won the Danish league title in 2021, their first championship in 16 years.

== Honours ==
Brøndby

- Danish Football Championship: 1990, 1991

Copenhagen

- Danish Cup: 1994–95, 1996–97
- Danish Super Cup: 1995
