= Asbjørn Sennels =

Danish footballer (1979–2023)

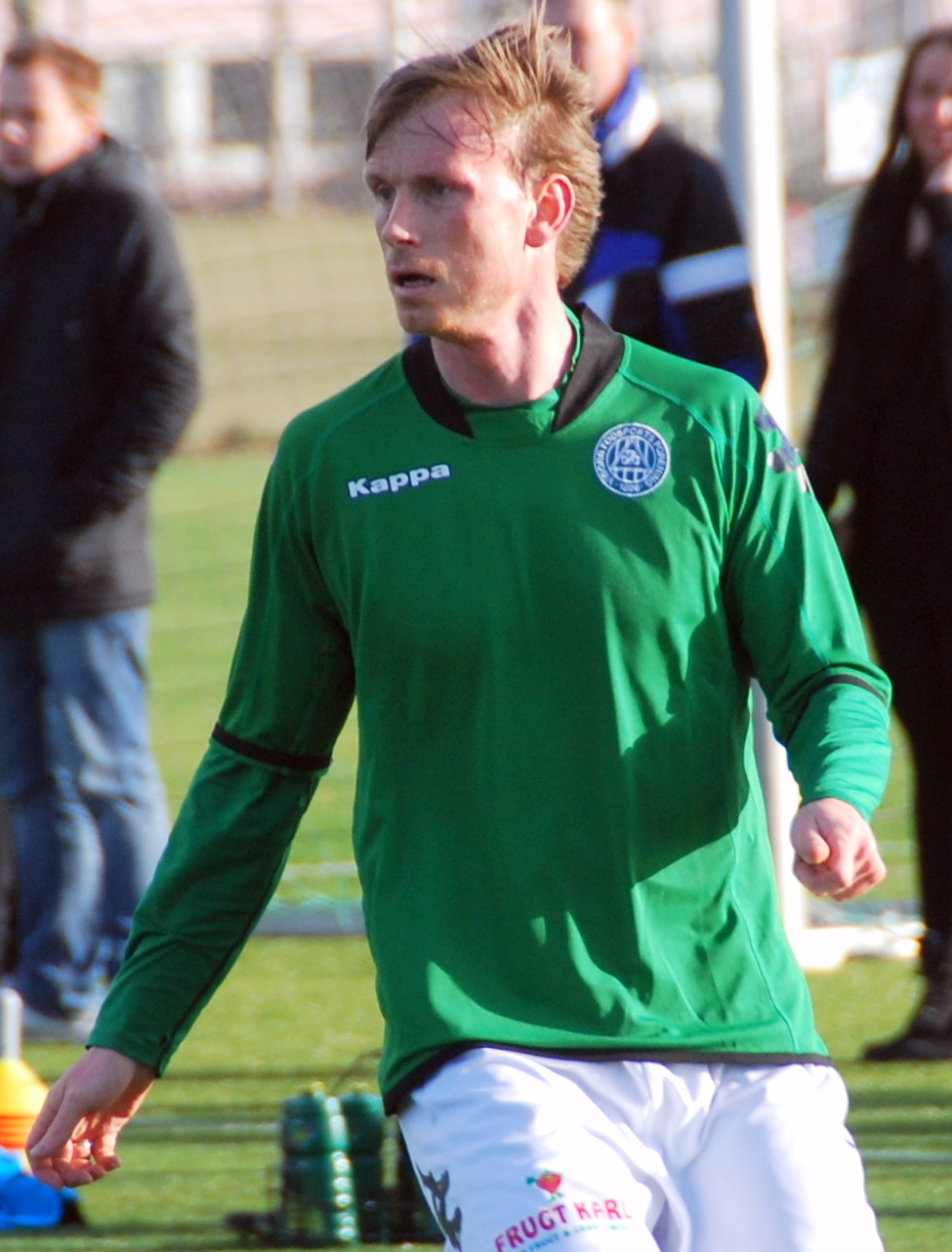
- Sennels in 2012

Personal information
- Date of birth: 17 January 1979
- Place of birth: Brabrand, Denmark
- Date of death: 9 July 2023 (aged 44)
- Position: Left-back

Youth career
- Brabrand IF

Senior career*
| Years | Team | Apps | (Gls) |
| 1998–1999 | Skovbakken | | |
| 1999–2004 | Viborg | 108 | (2) |
| 2004–2007 | Brøndby | 74 | (1) |
| 2007–2010 | Viborg | 59 | (2) |
| 2010–2012 | Tjele Vest Sport | | |
| 2012 | Viborg | 11 | (0) |

International career
| 2000–2001 | Denmark U21 | 10 | (0) |
| 2003–2004 | Denmark League XI | 4 | (0) |
| 2003–2004 | Denmark | 2 | (0) |

Managerial career
- 2017–2018: Viborg FF II (player-assistant)
- 2018–2020: Tjele Vest Sport (player-assistant)
- 2020–2022: Tjele Vest Sport (player-manager)
- * Club domestic league appearances and goals

Asbjørn Sennels (17 January 1979 – 9 July 2023) was a Danish professional footballer who played as a left-back. He made two appearances for the Denmark national team.

== Club career ==
Born in Brabrand, Aarhus Municipality, Denmark, Sennels started his football career playing for local lower-league clubs Brabrand IF and Skovbakken. "As a boy, I was a bit too small and too slow. I wasn't always good enough for the first team, but I believe that adversity has benefited me in the long run," he told in an interview with Jyllands-Posten in 2003.

He made his breakthrough with Danish Superliga club Viborg in the 1999–2000 Superliga season, making his professional debut on 21 May 2000 as a starter in a convincing 7–2 victory against AaB. He made 108 league appearances for Viborg during his five years at the club.

In February 2004, Sennels was signed by league rivals Brøndby. Their manager, Michael Laudrup, brought in Sennels to fill the left-back position previously held by Aurelijus Skarbalius. Sennels made his debut for Brøndby in the UEFA Cup matches against Barcelona in 2004. Initially, he struggled to perform well in his first appearances for Brøndby, partly because he was replacing fan-favourite Skarbalius. However, he gradually found his rhythm and went on to appear in all 33 matches for Brøndby in the 2004–05 season, during which the club secured both the league title and the Danish Cup. Laudrup later brought in Joseph Elanga to compete with Sennels for the left-back position, resulting in Sennels playing in 19 out of 33 matches in the subsequent season.

When René Meulensteen took over as manager of Brøndby, Sennels faced even tougher competition for his position due to the arrival of on-loan left-back Adam Eckersley from Manchester United. With Meulensteen's departure halfway through the 2006–07 season, Sennels was informed by the caretaker manager, Tom Køhlert, that he had no future at the club. Consequently, he returned to Viborg in the summer of 2007, before leaving as his contract expired in 2010.

== International career ==
Sennels was called up for the Denmark under-21 national team after making his breakthrough for Viborg, and made his international debut for the U21 team in a friendly against Germany U21 on 14 November 2000, starting in a 2–2 draw. He would gain ten caps for the under-21 side.

Sennels was called up to the Denmark senior squad for the first time on 11 August 2003 by national team manager Morten Olsen. At that point, he had already made two appearances for the Denmark League XI team. He made his Denmark international debut in a friendly against Finland at Parken on 20 August, replacing René Henriksen after 64 minutes of a 1–1 draw. He would go on to make one more appearance for the national team.

== Later life ==
Sennels retired from professional football in the summer 2012, as his job as a high school teacher did not harmonise with his football career. However, he still played for Viborg FF's reserve team in the Denmark Series and as of the summer 2017, he functioned as a player-assistant coach for the team.

In the summer 2018, Sennels returned to Danish seventh division club Tjele Vest Sport as a player-assistant coach. In January 2020, he was promoted to player-head coach.

== Death ==
Sennels died on 9 July 2023, after having been diagnosed with small cell carcinoma in the spring of the same year. He was 44.

== Honours ==
Brøndby

- Danish Superliga: 2004–05
- Danish Cup: 2004–05
