= Brøndby IF =

Danish association football club

- Full name: Brøndbyernes Idrætsforening
- Nicknames: Drengene Fra Vestegnen (The Boys from Vestegnen)
- Founded: 3 December 1964; 61 years ago
- Stadium: Brøndby Stadium
- Capacity: 28,000
- Owner(s): Global Football Holdings (50.1%); Jan Bech Andersen (10%); Minority stockholders [<5%] (39.9%)
- Chairman: Jan Bech Andersen
- Head coach: Thomas Nørgaard
- League: Superliga
- 2025–26: Superliga, 4th of 12
- Website: brondby.com
Home colours	Away colours

Brøndbyernes Idrætsforening (Danish pronunciation: [ˈpʁɶnˌpyˀɐnəs ˈitʁætsfɒˌe̝ˀne̝ŋ]), usually abbreviated to Brøndby IF (Danish pronunciation: [ˈpʁɶnˌpyˀ ˌiˀˈef]), is a Danish professional football club based in Brøndbyvester. Brøndby is the professional football section of Brøndbyernes Idrætsforening, which was founded on 3 December 1964 by a merger of the football clubs Brøndbyøster Idrætsforening (founded on 10 October 1928) and Brøndbyvester Idrætsforening (founded on 1 February 1909). The club's first team, which plays in the Danish Superliga, plays its home games at Brøndby Stadium in the clubs colours of blue and yellow.

The club has excelled both nationally and internationally by reaching the quarter-finals of the European Champions Cup in 1986-87 and the semi-finals of the UEFA Cup 1990–91. In addition, the club qualified for the UEFA Champions League in 1998, where Brøndby beat Bayern Munich in the group stage, and for the UEFA Cup / Europa League several times.

Through the 1980s, Brøndby's role in Danish football became more prominent after winning the Danish Superliga in 1985, 1987, 1988, 1990, and 1991. Between 1996 and 1998, Brøndby won three Danish championships in a row. In 1998, the club also won the Danish Cup and thus brought home "the double". Brøndby won the Danish Superliga in 2002 and the Danish Cup in 2005. The team recently won the Danish Cup in 2018 and the Danish Superliga in 2021.

Brøndby have a longstanding rivalry with city neighbours Copenhagen, against which they contest the Copenhagen Derby. The fixture is also referred to as the "Battle of Copenhagen" or the "New Firm".

== History ==
=== Formation (1964–1977) ===
Brøndbyernes Idrætsforening was formed on 3 December 1964 following a merger between two local rivals – Brøndbyøster IF and Brøndbyvester IF. The merger was to be completed as a prerequisite for the construction of a new stadium by Brøndby Municipality. Brøndby IF spent its inaugural season as an amateur club in the 6th tier of the 11 Danish leagues, the Serie 1, where they finished their two first seasons in fourth place. Among the players of the early years was team captain Per Bjerregaard, a doctor who had moved to Copenhagen from Randers in Jutland, and Hans Gregersen, who was the mascot of the team until his death by syphilis in 1967. In 1967, the club hired coach Leif Andersen who instantly secured promotion to Sjællandsserien (the Zealand series). After a few mediocre years, a new coach, John Sinding, was brought in, and the club won promotion to Danmarksserien (the Denmark series).

In 1973, Per Bjerregaard stopped his active career at 27 years of age and became chairman of Brøndby; his first action was to sack head coach Sinding. In his place, Brøndby hired former professional and Denmark national team player Finn Laudrup, who took over as head coach while he still took actively part in the matches as a player. Laudrup joined his brother-in-law Ebbe Skovdahl in the Brøndby team, and he brought his two young sons Brian and Michael Laudrup with him to the club. Under Finn Laudrup's influence, the club's playing style was changed to a more attacking strategy, even though Laudrup decided to fully concentrate his efforts as a player after only a year. After winning promotion in 1974, Laudrup left Brøndby in the third Division in 1976 to play for KB in the Danish top-flight league (then named the 1st Division) and a year later Michael Laudrup, the brightest talent in Danish football, followed.

=== Professional football (1977–1987) ===
In 1977, Brøndby moved up into the second Division, and were one of the clubs who quickly adapted to the new times of paid football in the best Danish leagues in 1978. Per Bjerregaard persuaded Finn Laudrup into returning to Brøndby in 1981 on a professional contract, and following a season of 85 goals in 30 matches, Brøndby won promotion to the top-flight 1st Division under coach Tom Køhlert. Finn Laudrup subsequently ended his career at age 36, but in his place Michael Laudrup returned for the 1982 season, being one of ten players leaving KB that year.

Brøndby won their 1st Division debut match 7–1 over fellow promoted team B 1909 in a match which featured two goals from Michael Laudrup. He was subsequently called up for the Denmark national team, and on 15 June 1982 he became the first Brøndby player to win a cap for the national team. Brøndby finished their first 1st Division season in fourth place with Laudrup the league's third top goal scorer with 15 goals, earning him the Danish Player of the Year award. In 1983, Laudrup was sold to Juventus in the then-biggest transfer deal in Denmark, giving Brøndby the economic foundation to expand further.

After four years in the top division, Brøndby won their first Danish championship in 1985 and played its first European match when the club beat Hungarian champions Budapest Honvéd 4–1 in the 1986 European Cup. In 1986, Brøndby became the first Danish club of fully professionals when ten players were signed full-time, and the club was introduced at the Copenhagen Stock Exchange in 1987.

=== European success (1987–1992) ===
Throughout the second half of the 1980s, the team dominated the league and did not finish lower than second place until 1992. The team was built around talented Danish players, and from 1987 to 1991 players from Brøndby won the Danish Player of the Year award every year. The recipients formed the backbone of the Denmark national team which later won UEFA Euro 1992, and was the first goalscorer in the 2–0 Euro 1992 final win John "Faxe" Jensen (1987), national team captain Lars Olsen (1988), the World's Best Goalkeeper 1992 and 1993 award winner Peter Schmeichel (1989), four-time Danish Player of the Year award winner Brian Laudrup (1990) and the second goalscorer of the Euro 1992 final Kim Vilfort (1991). The club became used to winning the national title and turned its attention towards European success.

In 1990, Brøndby hired former national team captain Morten Olsen as coach, and under his reign, the 1990–91 UEFA Cup became the high point in the short history of the club. Especially the meriting wins over German sides Eintracht Frankfurt and Bayer Leverkusen, and Russian club Torpedo Moscow saw the many Danish profiles shine, and the club was minutes from qualifying for the final match of the tournament. In the 88th minute of the semi-final, however, a Rudi Völler goal denied Brøndby a trip to the UEFA Cup final in favour of Roma. Following the impressive European display by the comparatively small club, important members of the team, including Lars Olsen, top scoring striker Bent "Turbo" Christensen and star goalkeeper Peter Schmeichel, left the club.

The following year, 1992, was the worst year in the club's history as the intended takeover of the Danish bank Interbank went awry. It was expected that European Cup success would boost the Brøndby stock value in order to finance the buy, but as the club was beaten by Dynamo Kyiv in the 1991–92 European Cup qualification, the stocks never reached the value necessary to finalize the deal. It had been arranged for financial backers Hafnia Insurance Company to step in and take over the buy in case Brøndby could not finance it, but as Hafnia went bankrupt, Brøndby were forced to buy Interbank and financial collapse was imminent as club debts amassed to 400 million DKK. A long-term rescue plan was initiated to save the club, but these events influenced the performance of the team and the championship, now called the Danish Superliga, was not won again until 1996.

=== Rebuilding (1992–2002) ===
The rebuilding of the team was led by head coach Ebbe Skovdahl, who deployed the team in a 4-4-2 formation. The return to the club of Euro 1992 veterans John Jensen and captain Lars Olsen combined with the emergence of goalkeeper Mogens Krogh and striker Ebbe Sand got the club back on its feet. The rebuilding culminated in the 1995–96 UEFA Cup elimination of Liverpool, though Roma once again knocked Brøndby out. Including that year, Brøndby won three Danish championships in a row, and the next year's UEFA Cup saw one of the biggest upsets in Brøndby history, as a 3–1 home defeat to Karlsruher SC was changed to an aggregate win when Brøndby beat the team of Euro 1996 winner Thomas Häßler 5–0 away in Germany. Most importantly for the club's economy, Brøndby qualified for the new format of the European Cup, rebranded as the UEFA Champions League.^{[A]}

The Champions League qualification meant six guaranteed matches in a group stage with three of the biggest teams of Europe, and when they were paired with Barcelona and later finalists Manchester United and Bayern Munich, Brøndby faced very economically attractive matches. Despite winning 2–1 over Bayern in the first match of the group stage, Brøndby conceded 18 goals in 6 matches and were eliminated with a single win to their name.

Skovdahl decided to take a stab at coaching at Scottish club Aberdeen and Brøndby took a more Scandinavian approach, in search of stable success in the European competitions with Norwegian club Rosenborg the role model. The club hired Norwegian manager Åge Hareide in 2000, who proclaimed a shift in line-up to a more attacking 4–3–3 system. With Hareide came a handful of Scandinavian players of whom especially Sweden national team player Mattias Jonson became a fan favourite.

The year 2000 was also the year the club finalized a planned expansion of Brøndby Stadion from a 20,000 to a 29,000 capacity, making it the second largest stadium in Denmark, only trailing the Parken Stadium of Copenhagen. At the cost of 250 million DKK, the vast expenditure was seen as a sign that the club was out of its former financial crisis. The building project was finalized in Autumn 2000, and on 22 October, 28,416 spectators saw Brøndby beat AB 4–2 in the opening match of the rebuilt stadium.

Hareide's visions of a 4–3–3 system never worked out, and the team soon returned to the well-known 4–4–2 setup. As he slowly lost hold of a ten-point lead to rivals Copenhagen, gained in a great first half of the 2001–02 Superliga season, Hareide took his leave in spring 2002 before the last matches of the season. He was replaced by youth team coach Tom Køhlert, who, though reluctant to take the job, gave first team debuts to the top youth team players, most notably Thomas Kahlenberg, who helped the club narrowly secure the championship win on goal difference.

=== The Laudrup years (2002–2006) ===
In the 2002–03 pre-season, Brøndby announced that Danish icon Michael Laudrup was taking the manager seat in his old club with John Jensen, also a club legend, as his assistant. In their first season, there were massive cuts from the very large squad; ten players were put in the reserves squad or sold and a talent squad was established. The club was to rely even more home grown players, as Brøndby was already famous for developing very talented players. In the process, Laudrup told several players to find new clubs as he thought they would not fit in the playing style he wanted to implement.

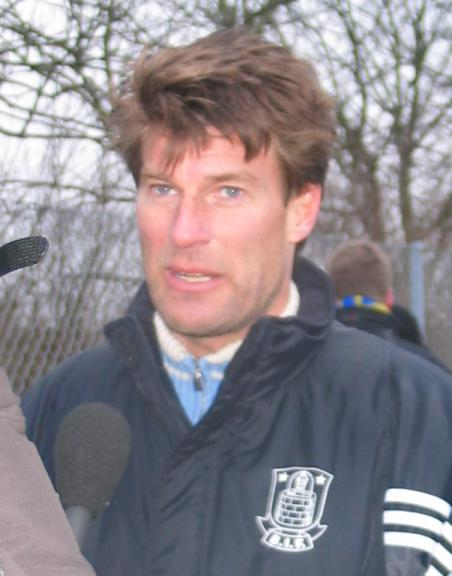
Laudrup as Brøndby manager

During the Laudrup era, Brøndby won the Double in 2005. The club was relatively successful in the European competitions as Schalke 04 was beaten 2–1 in the 2003–04 UEFA Cup, but were later beaten by Laudrup's former club Barcelona, 0–1.

In May 2006, it was announced that Laudrup and Jensen could not agree with the board of Brøndby regarding an extension of their contracts, and the duo left the club.

=== Years of crisis (2006–2013) ===
The two were replaced by Dutch coach René Meulensteen, who had a rough start in charge of the first team. Together with newly appointed Anders Bjerregaard – son of director Per Bjerregaard – Meulensteen bought a number of questionable players in the final days of the summer transfer window. In the first matches, the new coach struggled with injuries among the key players and the team had problems living up to the expectations.

Meulensteen resigned after six months, leaving Brøndby in seventh position halfway through the 2006–07 Superliga. The official explanation for his departure was that his family could not settle in Denmark, but soon after, the former coach revealed major infrastructural problems in the club's organization, calling the club "a very sick patient requiring immediate attention", as well as cliques inside the first team. In order to solve the clique problems, he had gone to director Per Bjerregaard to fire three key players – Marcus Lantz, Thomas Rytter and one club man Per Nielsen – in order to reestablish the balance in the first team squad, a demand Danish football experts later described as the quickest way of getting sacked.

Tom Køhlert took the managerial reins once more, this time as a permanent solution on a two-and-a-half-year contract.

After losing 2–4 to Horsens on 26 August, their 23rd consecutive away match without a victory, the team was met by approximately 200 furious fans and cries like "die mercenaries" and "we are Brøndby, who are you?" on their return to Brøndby.

On 31 August 2007, Per Bjerregaard announced that he resigned from the position as director of Brøndby, and instead took over as chairman of the board. Shortly after his resignation, Peter Schmeichel announced that he was ready to purchase Brøndby and become a director. The announcement divided the fans. Some praised the former player for trying to save the club, while others criticized him for bringing investor Aldo Petersen along, a keen supporter and former stockholder of rivals Copenhagen. Schmeichel's offer, however, was rejected. On 1 April 2008, Hermann Haraldsson was appointed to the vacant position.

Following a disappointing beginning of the 2007–08 Superliga season with only five points gained from seven matches, manager Tom Køhlert made it clear in August 2007 that the Danish Cup now had a higher priority for the club. The change of priorities was successful, and Brøndby won their first domestic title in almost three years on 1 May 2008 when Esbjerg were defeated 3–2 in the final of the 2007–08 Danish Cup. Soon after, manager Køhlert declared his job complete, prompting club chairman Bjerregaard to search for his replacement. On 16 June 2008, the club announced the appointment of former player and head coach of Horsens, Kent Nielsen. Nielsen took charge of the first team on 1 January 2009. Former legendary coach Køhlert in the meantime led Brøndby to the first place, where they stayed until Nielsen arrived.

On 1 July 2008, KasiGroup replaced Codan as the main sponsor of the club. The partnership involved a cooperation with UNICEF, making Brøndby the third club in Europe next to Barcelona and Swedish side Hammarby to wear the UNICEF logo on their shirts. Furthermore, KasiGroup entered a sponsorship for the stadium and promised substantial funds for strengthening the first-team squad. During the 2008 summer transfer window, this contributed to Brøndby signing five new players with national team experience in order to strengthen the team.

On 30 December 2009, KasiGroup owner Jesper Nielsen got in trouble with Brøndby and refused to pay the remainder of the pledged money. On 31 August 2012, Brøndby told the Danish media B.T. that KasiGroup owed the club more than DKK 45 million (€6,000,000 / £5,000,000). Nielsen told B.T. that he could recognize the amount but that his lawyer thought they could make a settlement at a much lower figure than the 45 million. Nielsen was the owner of AG, which went bankrupt on 31 July 2012. He was thus chased by both Brøndby and the Danish tax authorities, and a lawsuit followed. The case came to a close years later, in 2018, when Brøndby and Nielsen reached a multi-million Danish kroner settlement, depending on Nielsen's active arbitration case against jewellery manufacturer Pandora.

=== The Jan Bech era ===
==== Thomas Frank and "Oscar-gate" (2013–2016) ====
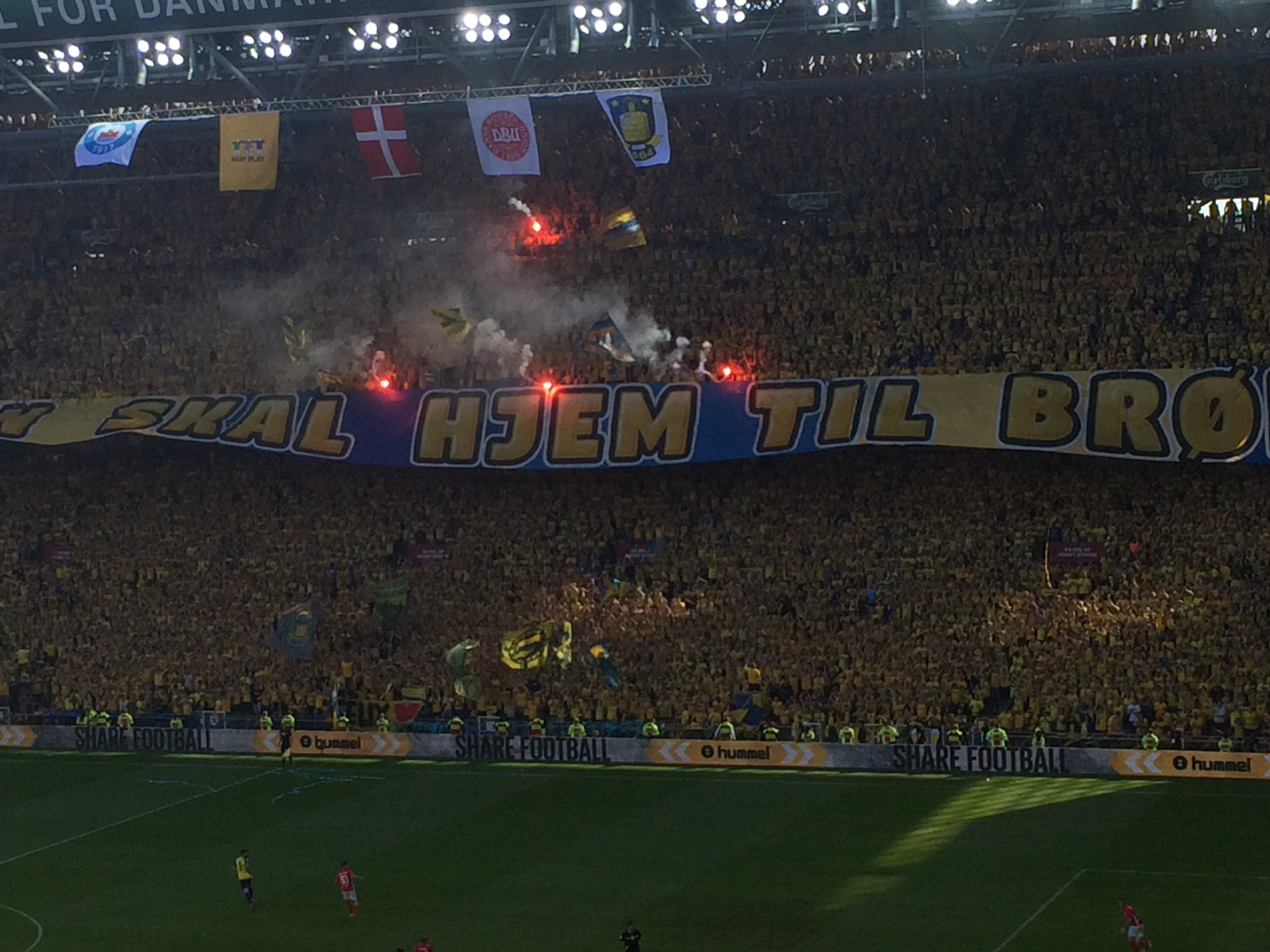
Brøndby fans at Parken Stadium ahead of their Danish Cup win over Silkeborg in 2018.

In May 2013, the club was again close to bankruptcy, but was taken over and saved by a small group of investors led by Ole Abildgaard and Aldo Pedersen. On 10 April 2014, the new main investor, Jan Bech Andersen, took over as chairman and replaced the board with his own team. On 14 July 2014, the club announced they had signed a one-year contract with Danish betting company Bet25 as their main sponsor, with the option to extend the contract for an additional two years. The deal was said to be worth "a significant amount in the million Danish kroner range". The deal includes a strategic partnership between Brøndby and Bet25. As part of the contract, Danish telecommunications company TDC A/S (which owns 51% of Bet25), installed Wi-Fi in Brøndby Stadion in December 2014. On 15 January 2015, it was announced Brøndby and Bet25 extended their contract until summer 2017.

In 2016, Thomas Frank announced his resignation as Brøndby manager after chairman Jan Bech Andersen had discredited him on an online chat-forum under the name of "Oscar", the case being referred to as "Oscar-gate" by the media. Bech Andersen stepped down as chairman after the incident but continued as board member.

==== Zorniger and the German years (2016–2019) ====
In April 2016, the board of directors presented Strategi 6.4 (Strategy 6.4), a plan for the future course of the club. The main value presented was "community" (Danish: "fællesskab"), and a vision for Brøndby was also laid out. Between 2016 and 2019, the club was to make the Superliga championship playoff every year, become more transparent and reach economic viability by the end of the period. Finally, between 2020 and 2023, Brøndby was to reach European football every season and continue to improve in areas of community, transparency and economy. In addition, the team should strive for a tactic with strong pressing and return to having one of the best youth academies in Denmark again.

On 17 May 2016, Brøndby named German coach Alexander Zorniger as their new head coach. His first two seasons as head coach resulted in two second-place league finishes and a Danish Cup win. The focal point of Brøndby under Zorniger was an extreme form of the German Gegenpressing tactic, popularly translated to overfaldsfodbold (assault football) in Denmark; a style which proved to be a success. During the 2017–18 season, Brøndby mounted an eventful title charge to eventually finish second behind Midtjylland after being top of the table in the penultimate round. Zorniger was sacked in February 2019, following a poor start to the new campaign. His position had earlier been called into question after a match against Hobro in December 2018, where Brøndby's starting lineup featured no Danes. After the match, Zorniger criticised the Brøndby youth department for lacking quality and the Danish mentality for being poor. Martin Retov and Matthias Jaissle, former assistants under Zorniger, were appointed as caretaker managers the next day.

==== Frederiksen, "CV" and Superliga Champions (2019–2022) ====
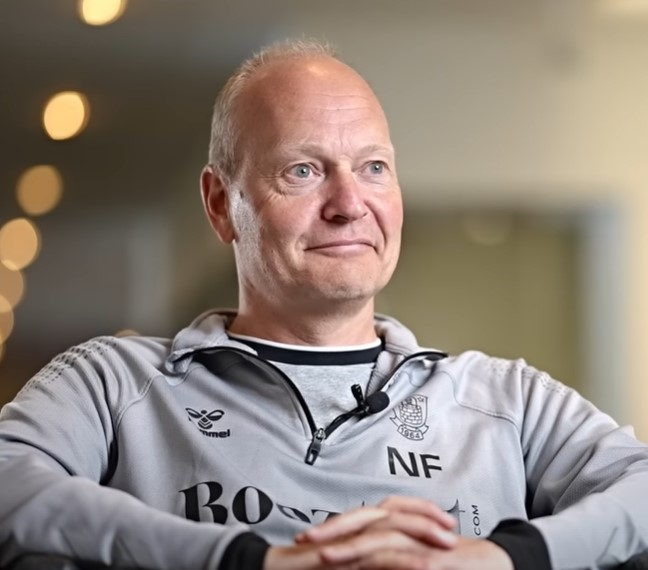
Niels Frederiksen led Brøndby to their first Superliga title in 16 years

In June 2019, former Denmark national U21 coach, Niels Frederiksen, was presented as the new head coach of Brøndby. A month later, Carsten "CV" Jensen was appointed as Director of Football in Brøndby, and became the person responsible for meeting the requirements of implementing Strategi 6.4. In Frederiksen's first season, Brøndby ended in fourth place of the league table, as the team failed to reach qualification to the Europa League. However, the team was largely seen to be in a rebuilding phase, with the departures of important first-team player such as Kamil Wilczek, Dominik Kaiser and Hany Mukhtar in the January transfer window, and the emergence of younger players such as Morten Frendrup, Jesper Lindstrøm and Anis Ben Slimane in the starting lineup.

On 24 May 2021, Brøndby won its first Danish league title in 16 years with a 2–0 win over Nordsjælland. Brøndby finished the season ahead of Midtjylland and arch-rivals Copenhagen.

=== Global Football Holdings ownership (2022–present) ===
In August 2022, chairman of the club Jan Bech Andersen sold over half of his shares to Global Football Holdings (GFH), an American sports investment company owned by David Blitzer. Andersen continued as chairman of the board. On 14 November, Frederiksen was dismissed from his position after Brøndby ended 2022 in tenth place in the league table. In January 2023, Brøndby announced Jesper Sørensen, formerly Frederiksen's assistant coach, as their new head coach. On the final matchday of the championship round in the 2023–24 season, Brøndby lost 3–2 at home against AGF, which resulted in them losing the title to Midtjylland by just one point.

On 8 October 2024, director of football Carsten V. Jensen left the position by mutual consent. Vice chairman Scott McLachlan took over as caretaker. Sørensen was dismissed on 11 December 2024, with Frederik Birk taking over first as caretaker and since as permanent head coach. On 30 December 2024, Brøndby announced Benjamin Schmedes as their new director of football. Steve Cooper was named head coach in September 2025.

== Stadium ==
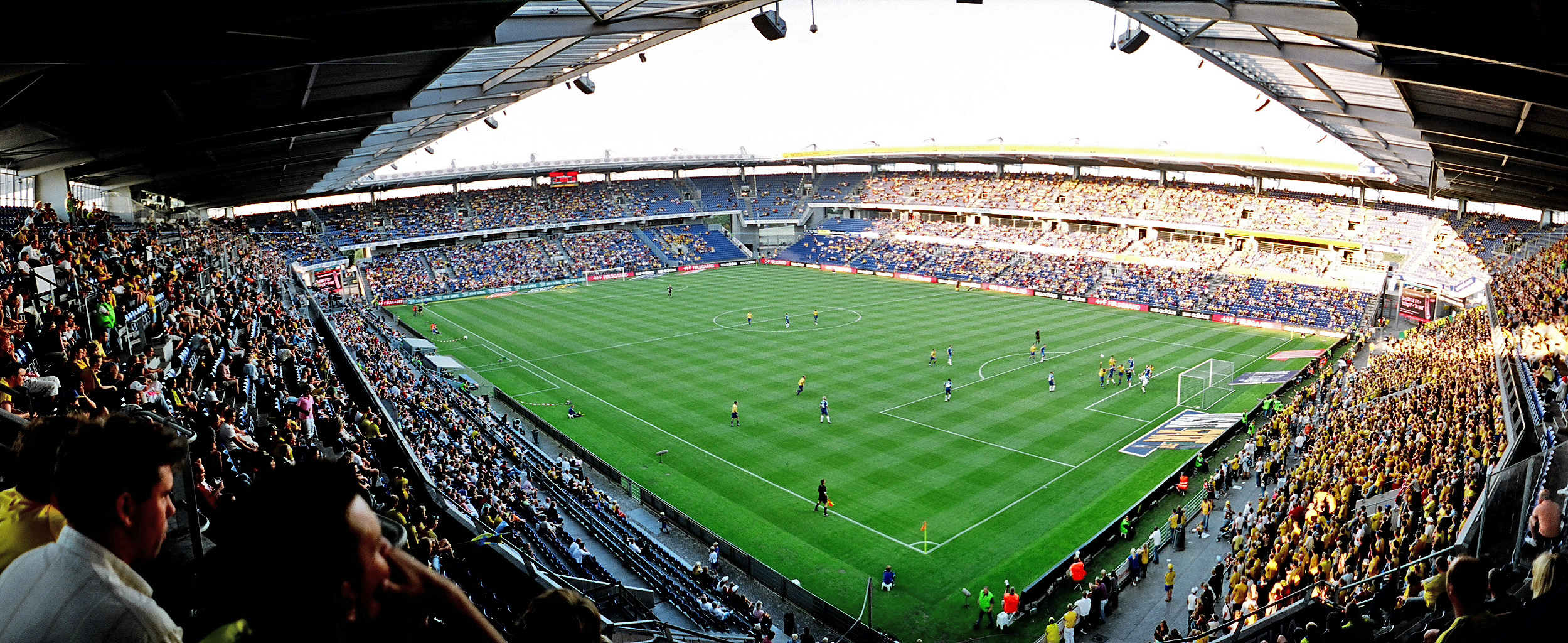
Panorama view of Brøndby Stadion at the 3–0 win against Horsens on 5 August 2006

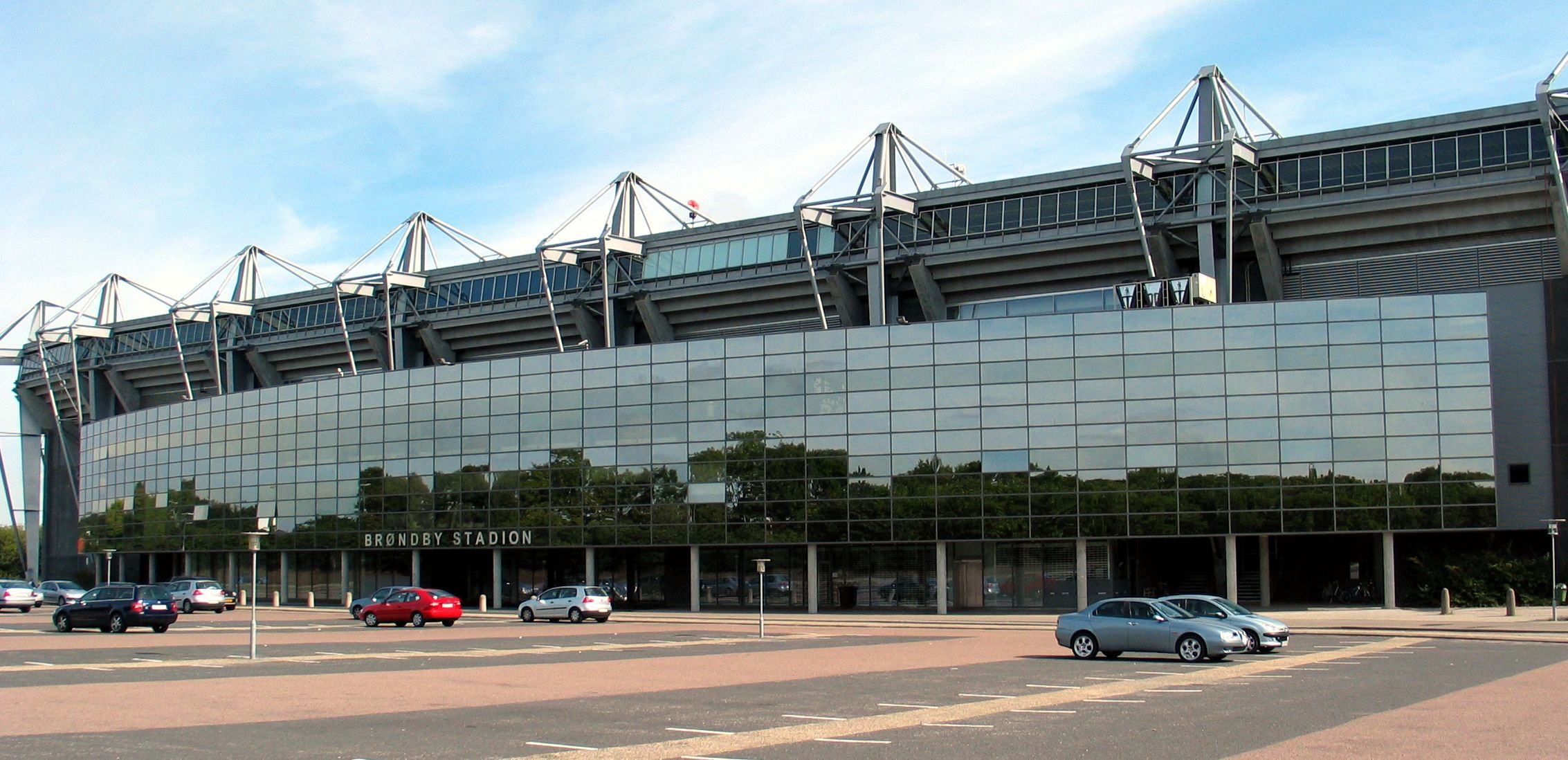
2005: The facade of the rebuilt Brøndby Stadion.

Brøndby have always played their matches at Brøndby Stadion. A part of the merging of Brøndbyvester IF and Brøndbyøster IF was a promise by the Brøndby municipality mayor to build a ground, and in 1965 it was ready for the club to play in. Through the first years in the secondary Danish leagues, the stadium was little more than a grass field with an athletics track circling the field of play. In 1978, the main stand was built, which supports a capacity of 1,200 seated spectators. In 1982, concrete terraces opposite the main stand were constructed, allowing for a crowd of 5,000 additional people. Following the first years of success in the top-flight, the athletic track was removed and a further 2,000 seats were installed on top of the concrete stands from 1989 to 1990.

When Brøndby played matches against other successful European teams in the 1990–91 UEFA Cup, the then capacity of up to 10,000 spectators was quickly dwarfed by the ticket interest. As the Denmark national stadium Idrætsparken in Copenhagen was being rebuilt, the club began to use scaffolding stands, which boosted the stadium capacity to 18,000 in the semi-final leg of the tournament, a 0–0 draw with Roma. The club inaugurated its end stands in 1992, allowing for a total of 22,000 spectators.

In May 1998, the club bought Brøndby Stadion from the Brøndby municipality for 23.5 million DKK and immediately spent double that amount to modernize the stadium. When the club qualified for the 1998–99 UEFA Champions League, the stadium was still under construction and the matches were moved to archrival Copenhagen's Parken Stadium. In 2000, all stands were standardized and built to the same height, allowing for crowds of 29,000 at domestic matches and 22,000 in the European matches, which allow only all-seated crowds. Since then, the stadium has seen a number of lesser or larger infrastructural and technical enhancements, and the February 2004 European match against Barcelona was played in front of a 26,031-spectator crowd.

== Support ==
Brøndby is the most widely popular football club in Denmark, with a 2015 study having showed that Brøndby matches have by far the most viewers, both in terms of attendance and TV ratings, with Brøndby's rivals Copenhagen coming in second. Copenhagen have in recent years surpassed Brøndby in terms of attendance by several thousands.

Brøndby Support is the official fan club of Brøndby. It was founded in 1993 and has approximately 12,000 members.

Fanafdelingen is in some ways the spiritual successor to Brøndby Supporters Trust, which was a supporters trust with the dedicated goal of gaining influence in the club. Brøndby Supporters Trust managed to gain a board seat in the professional club in 2013. In 2018 BST was given the task of organising the groups of Brøndby Supporters Trust, Alpha Brøndby, Brøndby Support and Svinget under a common umbrella organisation. As a result of this, Fanafdelingen was born. Fanafdelingen, among other things, organises a yearly election for the board seat for the fan representative in the club.

Brøndby is also renowned for its ultra fanscene. The most prominent group is Alpha. Founded in 2006, the group is placed in the centre of the Southside Stand and are the main organizers of songs, flags, banners and tifo. Other prominent groups are Suburban Casuals, Southside United, Svinget, Deling 43 and Fri Sport.

== Honours ==
- Danish Football Championship
  - Winners (11): 1985, 1987, 1988, 1990, 1991, 1995–96, 1996–97, 1997–98, 2001–02, 2004–05, 2020–21
  - Runner–up (12): 1986, 1989, 1994–95, 1998–99, 1999–2000, 2000–01, 2002–03, 2003–04, 2005–06, 2016–17, 2017–18, 2023–24
- Danish Cup
  - Winners (7): 1988–89, 1993–94, 1997–98, 2002–03, 2004–05, 2007–08, 2017–18
  - Runner–up (4): 1987–88, 1995–96, 2016–17, 2018–19
- Danish League Cup
  - Winners (2): 2005, 2006
- Danish Super Cup
  - Winners (4): 1994, 1996, 1997, 2002
- Royal League (3 participations)
  - Winners: 2006–07
- Atlantic Cup
  - Winners: 2023, 2025
- Denmark Series (fourth tier)
  - Group winners: 1974 (g1)
- Zealand Series (fifth tier)
  - Winners: 1971

== Players ==
See also Brøndby IF players

More than 500 players have represented Brøndby in the Danish leagues, cups and the European competitions since 1964.

=== Current squad ===
As of 2 September 2026

Note: Flags indicate national team as defined under FIFA eligibility rules; some limited exceptions apply. Players may hold more than one non-FIFA nationality.

No.	Pos.	Nation	Player
1	GK	AUT	Patrick Pentz
2	DF	DEN	Oliver Villadsen
3	DF	AUT	Christopher Olivier
4	DF	SCO	Luis Binks (captain)
7	FW	DEN	Olti Hyseni
9	FW	DEN	Patrick Mortensen
10	MF	DEN	Daniel Wass (club captain)
11	FW	DEN	Filip Bundgaard
13	GK	USA	Gavin Beavers
15	MF	DEN	Casper Winther
16	GK	DEN	Adrian Kappenberger
17	FW	NGR	Emmanuel Dennis
18	MF	DEN	Max Ejdum
19	FW	JPN	Shō Fukuda

No.	Pos.	Nation	Player
21	FW	AUS	Marcus Younis
24	DF	CRO	Marko Divković
27	DF	GER	Mats Köhlert
29	MF	DEN	Mads Frøkjær-Jensen
30	DF	BEL	Jordi Vanlerberghe
32	DF	DEN	Frederik Alves
34	DF	DEN	Lukas Larsen
36	MF	DEN	Viggo Poulsen
37	DF	DEN	Raphael Canut
38	FW	DEN	Jacob Ambæk
50	GK	DEN	William Sonne-Schmidt
51	FW	DEN	Oskar Fenger
99	MF	POL	Bartosz Slisz (vice-captain)

=== Youth players in use ===
Note: Flags indicate national team as defined under FIFA eligibility rules; some limited exceptions apply. Players may hold more than one non-FIFA nationality.

No.	Pos.	Nation	Player
43	MF	DEN	Ali Al-Najar

=== Out on loan ===
Note: Flags indicate national team as defined under FIFA eligibility rules; some limited exceptions apply. Players may hold more than one non-FIFA nationality.

No.	Pos.	Nation	Player
—	GK	SLE	Mamadou Jalloh (at Vaasan Palloseura until 31 November 2026)
—	MF	DEN	André Escobar Jensen (at Thisted until 31 December 2026)
—	MF	BIH	Benjamin Tahirović (at Genk until 30 June 2027)

No.	Pos.	Nation	Player
—	FW	JPN	Kōtarō Uchino (at Mito HollyHock until 30 June 2027)
—	FW	SEN	Ousmane Sow (at Jagiellonia until 30 June 2027)

=== Player of the year ===
Starting from 1980, the club has annually named its player of the year. Players still playing for the club are marked in bold:

- 1980: (Denmark) Brian Chrøis
- 1981: (Denmark) Ole Østergaard
- 1982: (Denmark) Michael Laudrup
- 1983: (Denmark) John Widell
- 1984: (Denmark) Bjarne Jensen
- 1985: (Denmark) Claus Nielsen
- 1986: (Denmark) Ole Madsen
- 1987: (Denmark) Lars Olsen
- 1988: (Denmark) Bjarne Jensen (2)
- 1989: (Denmark) Henrik Jensen
- 1990: (Denmark) Peter Schmeichel
- 1991: (Denmark) Kim Vilfort
- 1992: (Nigeria) Uche Okechukwu
- 1993: (Denmark) Jes Høgh
- 1994: (Denmark) Ole Bjur
- 1995: (Denmark) Allan Nielsen
- 1996: (Denmark) Søren Colding
- 1997: (Denmark) Ebbe Sand
- 1998: (Denmark) Kim Daugaard
- 1999: (Denmark) Mogens Krogh
- 2000: (Denmark) Dan Anton Johansen
- 2001: (Sweden) Krister Nordin
- 2002: (Lithuania) Aurelijus Skarbalius
- 2003: (Denmark) Per Nielsen
- 2004: (Denmark) Martin Retov
- 2005: (Sweden) Johan Elmander
- 2006: (Denmark) Per Nielsen (2)
- 2007: (England) Mark Howard
- 2008: (Denmark) Thomas Rasmussen
- 2009: (Denmark) Stephan Andersen
- 2010: (Denmark) Michael Krohn-Dehli
- 2011: (Denmark) Michael Krohn-Dehli (2)
- 2012: (Denmark) Mike Jensen
- 2013: (Denmark) Simon Makienok
- 2014: (Finland) Lukas Hradecky
- 2015: (Denmark) Riza Durmisi
- 2016: (Denmark) Frederik Rønnow
- 2017: (Denmark) Christian Nørgaard
- 2018: (Poland) Kamil Wilczek
- 2019: (Poland) Kamil Wilczek (2)
- 2020: (Denmark) Andreas Maxsø
- 2021: (Denmark) Mikael Uhre
- 2022: (Denmark) Mads Hermansen
- 2023: (Denmark) Nicolai Vallys
- 2024: (Austria) **Patrick Pentz**
- 2025: (Denmark) Noah Nartey

=== Wall of Honour ===
Since Michael Laudrup became the first player to represent Brøndby on the Denmark national team in June 1982, more than 80 players have donned the national team jersey of their respective countries. Apart from Denmark, players from Nigeria, Norway, Lithuania, Burkina Faso, Sweden, Faroe Islands, Morocco, Iceland, Zambia, Australia, Gambia, United States, Finland, North Macedonia, South Africa, Costa Rica, Poland, Hungary, Czech Republic, Kosovo, South Korea, Tunisia and Paraguay have represented their countries. The players are displayed on the "Wall of Honour", according to their year of national team debut. Players still playing for the club are marked in bold:

1980s

- (Denmark) Michael Laudrup (1982)
- (Denmark) Ole Madsen (1983)
- (Denmark) Brian Chrøis (1983)
- (Denmark) Ole Østergaard (1983)
- (Denmark) Lars Lunde (1983)
- (Denmark) Kim Christofte (1984)
- (Denmark) John Helt (1985)
- (Denmark) Lars Olsen (1986)
- (Denmark) John "Faxe" Jensen (1986)
- (Denmark) Claus Nielsen (1986)
- (Denmark) Kim Vilfort (1987)
- (Denmark) Per Steffensen (1987)
- (Denmark) Brian Laudrup (1987)
- (Denmark) Kent Nielsen (1987)
- (Denmark) Peter Schmeichel (1987)
- (Denmark) Bjarne Jensen (1988)
- (Denmark) Jan Bartram (1988)
- (Denmark) Bent "Turbo" Christensen (1989)
- (Denmark) Per Frimann (1989)

1990s

- (Denmark) Erik Rasmussen (1990)
- (Nigeria) Uche Okechukwu (1990)
- (Nigeria) Friday Elahor (1990)
- (Denmark) Brian Jensen (1991)
- (Denmark) Frank Pingel (1991)
- (Denmark) Mogens Krogh (1992)
- (Denmark) Marc Rieper (1992)
- (Denmark) Mark Strudal (1993)
- (Denmark) Jes Høgh (1993)
- (Norway) Dan Eggen (1993)
- (Denmark) Jesper Kristensen (1994)
- (Denmark) Jens Risager (1994)
- (Denmark) Bo Hansen (1995)
- (Denmark) Allan Nielsen (1995)
- (Denmark) Peter Møller (1996)
- (Denmark) Ole Bjur (1996)
- (Denmark) Søren Colding (1996)
- (Lithuania) Aurelijus Skarbalius (1996)
- (Denmark) Ebbe Sand (1998)
- (Burkina Faso) Oumar Barro (1999)

2000s

- (Sweden) Magnus Svensson (2000)
- (Sweden) Mattias Jonson (2000)
- (Denmark) Peter Madsen (2001)
- (Denmark) Mads Jørgensen (2001)
- (Denmark) Morten Wieghorst (2002)
- (Denmark) Per Nielsen (2002)
- (Faroe Islands) Jón Rói Jacobsen (2003)
- (Denmark) Thomas Kahlenberg (2003)
- (Sweden) Andreas Jakobsson (2003)
- (Morocco) Karim Zaza (2004)
- (Denmark) Asbjørn Sennels (2004)
- (Denmark) Martin Retov (2004)
- (Denmark) Morten Skoubo (2004)
- (Sweden) Johan Elmander (2004)
- (Denmark) Daniel Agger (2005)
- (Iceland) Hannes Sigurðsson (2006)
- (Sweden) Martin Ericsson (2006)
- (Zambia) Chris Katongo (2007)
- (Iceland) Stefán Gíslason (2007)
- (Sweden) Samuel Holmén (2008)
- (Denmark) Thomas Rasmussen (2008)
- (Denmark) Anders Randrup (2008)
- (Australia) David Williams (2008)
- (Sweden) Max von Schlebrügge (2008)
- (Denmark) Stephan Andersen (2008)
- (The Gambia) Ousman Jallow (2008)
- (Denmark) Michael Krohn-Dehli (2008)
- (Denmark) Morten "Duncan" Rasmussen (2008)
- (Sweden) Mikael Nilsson (2009)
- (Denmark) Martin Bernburg (2009)

2010s

- (Denmark) Mike Jensen (2010)
- (Denmark) **Daniel Wass** (2011)
- (Australia) Brent McGrath (2011)
- (United States) Clarence Goodson (2011)
- (Denmark) Dennis Rommedahl (2011)
- (Faroe Islands) René Joensen (2012)
- (Denmark) Simon Makienok (2013)
- (Finland) Lukáš Hrádecký (2013)
- (North Macedonia) Ferhan Hasani (2014)
- (Paraguay) José Ariel Núñez (2014)
- (Finland) Teemu Pukki (2014)
- (Iceland) Hólmbert Friðjónsson (2015)
- (South Africa) Lebogang Phiri (2015)
- (Denmark) Riza Durmisi (2015)
- (Denmark) Frederik Rønnow (2016)
- (Costa Rica) Marco Ureña (2016)
- (Poland) Kamil Wilczek (2016)
- (South Korea) Yun Suk-young (2017)
- (Finland) Paulus Arajuuri (2017)
- (Hungary) Zsolt Kalmár (2017)
- (Czech Republic) Jan Kliment (2017)
- (Kosovo) Besar Halimi (2017)
- (Iceland) Hjörtur Hermannsson (2017)
- (Sweden) Johan Larsson (2018)
- (Sweden) Simon Tibbling (2019)

2020s

- (Sweden) Simon Hedlund (2020)
- (Tunisia) Anis Ben Slimane (2020)
- (Paraguay) Blás Riveros (2020)
- (Denmark) Jesper Lindstrøm (2020)
- (Denmark) Andreas Maxsø (2020)
- (Denmark) Mikael Uhre (2021)
- (New Zealand) Joe Bell (2022)
- (Norway) Ohikhuaeme Omoijuanfo (2022)
- (Denmark) **Nicolai Vallys** (2023)
- (Austria) **Patrick Pentz** (2024)
- (Japan) Yuito Suzuki (2024)
- (Bosnia and Herzegovina) **Benjamin Tahirović** (2025)
- (Denmark) Mathias Kvistgaarden (2025)
- (Austria) **Michael Gregoritsch** (2025)
- (Poland) **Bartosz Slisz** (2026)
- (Scotland) **Luis Binks** (2026)
- (Australia) **Marcus Younis** (2026)

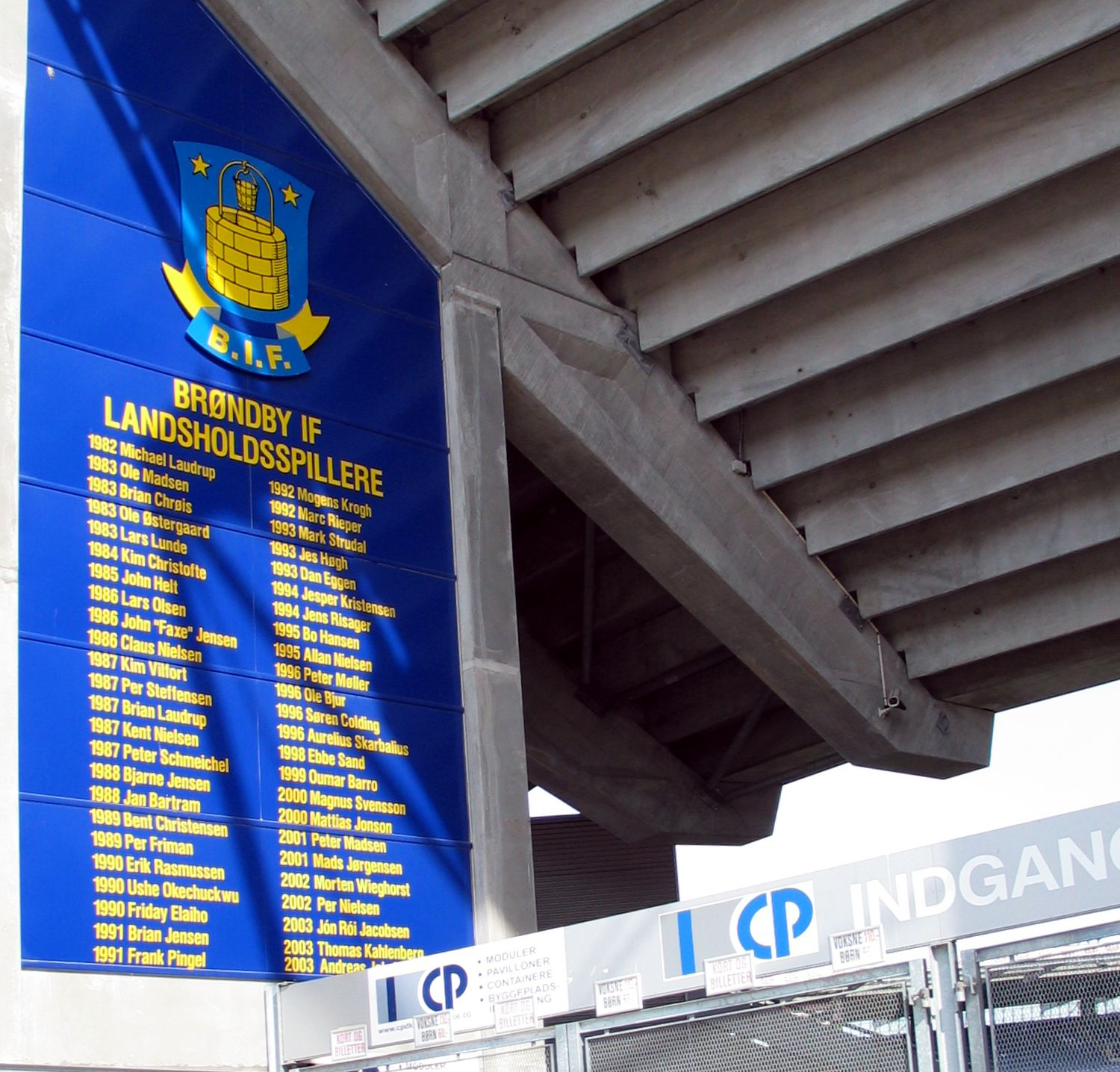
The "Wall of Honour" chronicling Brøndby's national team players, of varying nationalities, since 1982.

== Coaching staff ==
As of 12 June 2026

=== First team ===
Name	Role
(Denmark) Thomas Nørgaard	Head coach
(Denmark) Lasse Frølund	Assistant coach
(Denmark) Kevin Mensah	Individual coach
(Germany) Justin Merz	Goalkeeper coach
(England) David Tivey (Germany) Bennet Kästner	Fitness coach
(Denmark) Søren Frederiksen (Denmark) Carl-Emil Lopdrup	Analysts
(Denmark) Leif Mortensen	Team manager

== Senior management ==
Updated 22 May 2026

Name	Role
(Denmark) Jan Bech Andersen	Chairman of Board
(England) Scott McLachlan	Vice chairman
(Denmark) Vacant	CEO
(Denmark) Mikkel Jønsen	CFO
(Germany) Julius Ohnesorge	Executive Football Director

== Managerial history ==
The person responsible for direction of the first senior team has traditionally been given the title of head coach/trainer.

Name	Nationality	From	To	Refs
Egon Knudsen	Denmark	1964	1967	
Leif Andersen	Denmark	1967	1969	
Ib Jensen	Denmark	1969	1970	
John Sinding	Denmark	1970; ~1975	1972; ~1975	
Finn Laudrup ‡	Denmark	~1973	~1973	
Mogens Johansen	Denmark	~1973	~1973	
Kaj Møller	Denmark	~1974	~1974	
Jørgen Hvidemose	Denmark	1975	1980	
Tom Køhlert	Denmark	1 January 1981; 1 January 1999 †; 15 April 2002 †; 21 January 2007 †	30 June 1985; 30 June 1999 †; 30 June 2002 †; 31 December 2008 †	
Ebbe Skovdahl	Denmark	1 January 1986; 1 July 1988; 1 January 1992	30 June 1987; 31 December 1989; 30 June 1999	
Birger Peitersen	Denmark	1987	1988	
Morten Olsen	Denmark	1 January 1990	10 May 1992	
Åge Hareide	Norway	1 January 2000	15 April 2002	
Michael Laudrup	Denmark	1 July 2002	30 June 2006	
René Meulensteen	Netherlands	1 July 2006	17 January 2007	
Kent Nielsen	Denmark	1 January 2009	26 March 2010	
Henrik Jensen	Denmark	26 March 2010	24 October 2011	
Aurelijus "Auri" Skarbalius	Lithuania	25 October 2011; 9 March 2016 †	10 June 2013; 30 June 2016 †	
Thomas Frank	Denmark	11 June 2013	9 March 2016	
Alexander Zorniger	Germany	1 July 2016	18 February 2019	
Martin Retov †	Denmark	18 February 2019	1 June 2019	
Niels Frederiksen	Denmark	1 June 2019	14 November 2022	
Jesper Sørensen	Denmark	2 January 2023	11 December 2024	
Frederik Birk	Denmark	8 January 2025	9 September 2025	
Steve Cooper	Wales	9 September 2025	22 May 2026	

- † Managers with this symbol in the "Name" column are italicised to denote caretaker appointments.
- ‡ Persons with this symbol in the "Name" column denote status as a playing head coach/trainer.

== Records ==
- Record home win: 7–0 against Herfølge, Danish Superliga, 11 July 2005
- Record away win:

7–0 against Esbjerg, Danish Superliga, 26 August 2001
7–0 against AGF, Danish Superliga, 21 August 2016

- Record home defeat: 1–6 against Esbjerg, Danish Superliga, 14 March 2004
- Record away defeat: 0–5 against Midtjylland, Danish Superliga, 29 July 2007
- Record European win: 9–0 against Juvenes/Dogana, UEFA Europa League first qualifying round, 2 July 2015
- Record European defeat:

0–5 against Manchester United, UEFA Champions League group stage, 4 November 1998
0–5 against PAOK, UEFA Europa League play-off round, 20 August 2015

- Highest attendance, Brøndby Stadion: 31,508 vs. Copenhagen, 18 June 2003
- Highest average home attendance, season: 21,647, 2023–24
- Most appearances, total: 556, Bjarne Jensen
- Most European appearances: 70, Per Nielsen
- Most goals scored, Danish league history: 82, Bent Christensen
- Most goals scored, season, Danish Superliga: 28, Ebbe Sand 1997–98
- Most goals scored, Danish Superliga: 71, Kamil Wilczek
- Most goals scored, European matches: 12, Ruben Bagger
- Most goals scored, total: 121, Kim Vilfort'
- Most matches in a row without scoring: 6, 8 February to 7 April 2026
- Most matches in a row without a win: 12, 5 August 2012 to 11 November 2012

== Recent history ==
Season		Pos.	Pl.	W	D	L	GS	GA	P	Cup	Europe
1995–96	SL	1	33	20	7	6	71	32	67	Runner-Up	Third Round UEFA Cup
1996–97	SL	1	33	20	8	5	57	38	68	Semi-Finals	Quarter-Finals UEFA Cup
1997–98	SL	1	33	24	4	5	81	33	76	Winners	First Round UEFA Cup
1998–99	SL	2	33	19	4	10	73	37	61	Semi-Finals	Group Stage UEFA Champions League
1999–00	SL	2	33	15	9	9	56	37	54	Semi-Finals	Third Qualifying Round UEFA Champions League/First Round UEFA Cup
2000–01	SL	2	33	17	7	9	71	42	58	Quarter-Finals	First Round UEFA Cup
2001–02	SL	1	33	20	9	4	74	28	58	5th Round	Third Round UEFA Cup
2002–03	SL	2	33	17	11	7	51	32	56	Winners	First Round UEFA Cup
2003–04	SL	2	33	20	7	6	55	29	67	Semi-Finals	Third Round UEFA Cup
2004–05	SL	1	33	20	9	4	61	23	69	Winners	Second Qualifying Round UEFA Cup
2005–06	SL	2	33	21	4	8	60	32	67	Semi-Finals	Third Qualifying Round UEFA Champions League/Group Stage UEFA Cup
2006–07	SL	6	33	13	10	10	50	38	49	Fourth Round	First Round UEFA Cup
2007–08	SL	8	33	11	10	12	44	44	43	Winners	First Round UEFA Cup
2008–09	SL	3	33	21	5	7	55	31	68	Semi-Finals	First Round UEFA Cup
2009–10	SL	3	33	15	7	11	57	50	52	Fourth Round	Playoff Round UEFA Europa League
2010–11	SL	3	33	9	9	15	35	46	36	Third Round	Playoff Round UEFA Europa League
2011–12	SL	9	33	13	12	8	52	39	51	Fourth Round	Third Qualifying Round UEFA Europa League
2012–13	SL	9	33	9	12	12	39	45	39	Semi-Finals	
2013–14	SL	4	33	13	13	7	47	38	52	Second Round	Third Qualifying Round Europa League
2014–15	SL	3	33	16	7	10	43	29	55	Quarter-Finals	Playoff Round Europa League
2015–16	SL	4	33	16	6	11	43	37	54	Semi-Finals	Playoff Round Europa League
2016–17	SL	2	36	18	8	10	62	40	62	Runner-Up	Second Qualifying Round Europa League
2017–18	SL	2	36	24	9	3	82	37	81	Winners	Third Qualifying Round Europa League
2018–19	SL	4	36	15	7	14	60	52	52	Runner-Up	Playoff Round Europa League
2019–20	SL	4	36	16	8	12	56	42	56	Quarter-Finals	Third Qualifying Round Europa League
2020–21	SL	1	32	19	4	9	58	38	61	Fourth Round	
2021–22	SL	4	32	13	9	10	40	41	48	Quarter-Finals	Europa League Group Stage
2022–23	SL	5	32	12	8	12	48	52	44	Third Round	Third Qualifying Round Conference League
2023–24	SL	2	32	18	8	6	60	35	62	Quarter-Finals	
2024–25	SL	3	32	13	12	7	58	46	51	Semi-Finals	Third Qualifying Round Conference League
2025–26	SL	4	32	13	6	13	44	35	45	Fourth round	Play-off round Conference League

== Brøndby in European competitions ==
Brøndby's first competitive European match was on 17 September 1986 in the 1986–87 European Cup, defeating Budapest Honvéd 4–1 and later on Dynamo Berlin en route to a spot in the quarter-finals, where they lost to Porto. Since then, the club has been a regular fixture in European competitions, and reached the group stages of the UEFA Champions League and the UEFA Europa League several times. They also achieved one European semi-final in 1991, as well as another European quarter-final in 1997.

== UEFA club coefficient ranking ==
As of 31 October 2025

Rank	Team	Points
160	(Slovenia) Maribor	10.000
161	(Estonia) Flora Tallinn	10.000
162	(Denmark) Brøndby	9.500
163	(Northern Ireland) Linfield	9.500
164	Austria Wien	9.500

== Footnotes ==
A. Danish club Aalborg played in the 1995–96 Champions League tournament as a result of the bribing scandal of Dynamo Kyiv, thus they did not qualify through the qualification rounds.
