= 1991 Danish Superliga =

1st season of Danish Superliga

Danish Superliga
- Season: 1991
- Champions: Brøndby IF
- Relegated: Ikast FS

The 1991 Danish Superliga season was the 1st season of the Danish Superliga league championship, governed by the Danish Football Association.

After about 33 years it had been decided to abandon the format where the league would follow the calendar year, therefore the first superliga season was a short dash through the spring of 1991. The following season would kick off in August and end in May.

There was no continental qualification as it had been decided the previous year, with Brøndby IF qualifying for the 1991–92 European Cup, and B 1903 qualifying for the 1991–92 UEFA Cup along with Ikast fS. Odense, however, qualified for the 1991–92 European Cup Winners' Cup through the 1990–91 Danish Cup.

The lowest placed team of the tournament was directly relegated to the Danish 1st Division. Likewise, the Danish 1st Division champions were promoted to the Superliga. The second lowest team in the Superliga and the 1st Division runners-up played a promotion game, for competing in the Superliga.

== Table ==
Pos	Team	Pld	W	D	L	GF	GA	GD	Pts	Qualification or relegation
1	Brøndby (C)	18	10	6	2	26	15	+11	26	
2	Lyngby Boldklub	18	10	4	4	35	18	+17	24	
3	AGF	18	6	8	4	29	26	+3	20	
4	Frem	18	6	7	5	25	24	+1	19	
5	OB	18	3	11	4	21	20	+1	17	Qualification to Cup Winners' Cup first round
6	AaB	18	6	5	7	29	33	−4	17	
7	B 1903	18	6	4	8	19	18	+1	16	
8	Vejle BK	18	5	6	7	20	22	−2	16	
9	Silkeborg IF (O)	18	4	7	7	23	33	−10	15	Qualification to relegation play-off matches
10	Ikast FS (R)	18	3	4	11	9	27	−18	10	Relegation to Danish 1st Division

Source: danskfodbold.com
Rules for classification: 1) points; 2) goal difference; 3) number of goals scored.
(C) Champions; (O) Play-off winners; (R) Relegated

=== Relegation play-off ===
Team 1	Agg.	Team 2	1st leg	2nd leg
Silkeborg IF	5–4	B 1909	3–4	2–0

Silkeborg IF overcame a home first leg defeat to remain in the Superliga.

== Results ==
Home \ Away	AGF	B03	BKF	BIF	IFS	LBK	OB	SIF	VBK	AAB
AGF		2–1	2–1	1–2	3–2	1–1	3–1	2–1	0–0	6–1
B 1903	3–0		0–1	0–1	0–0	2–0	0–0	1–1	3–0	4–1
BK Frem	2–2	1–2		1–1	1–0	2–1	3–0	2–2	1–1	1–2
Brøndby IF	0–0	1–0	4–1		2–1	0–3	0–0	2–1	3–1	2–2
Ikast FS	1–1	1–0	2–1	0–1		1–0	0–0	1–2	0–2	0–0
Lyngby BK	2–1	4–1	1–1	1–1	5–0		1–0	5–2	1–0	2–0
OB	0–0	0–0	1–1	1–1	3–0	1–1		6–0	4–2	1–1
Silkeborg IF	3–3	0–1	1–1	1–0	1–0	4–3	2–2		0–0	1–1
Vejle BK	1–1	1–0	1–2	1–3	3–0	0–2	0–0	1–0		5–1
AaB	4–1	4–1	1–2	0–2	2–0	1–2	5–1	2–1	1–1	

== Top goalscorers ==
Bent Christensen was the top goalscorer, scoring 11 in 18 appearances.

Rank	Player	Club	Goals
1	(Denmark) Bent Christensen	Brøndby IF	11
2	(Denmark) Peter Møller	AaB	9
2	(Denmark) Per Pedersen	Lyngby BK	9
4	(Denmark) Flemming Christensen	Lyngby BK	8
4	(Denmark) Søren Andersen	Aarhus GF	8
6	(Denmark) Heine Fernandez	Silkeborg IF	7
7	(Denmark) Peter Nielsen	Lyngby BK	6
7	(Denmark) Torben Frank	Lyngby BK	6
7	(Denmark) Thomas Thorninger	Vejle BK	6
7	(Denmark) Torben Christensen	Aarhus GF	6
7	(Denmark) Jan Bartram	Aarhus GF	6
