= Jørgen Hvidemose =

Danish football manager (born 1940)

Personal information
- Date of birth: 12 May 1940 (age 86)
- Place of birth: Denmark

Managerial career
- Years: Team
- 1965–1966: KFUMs Boldklub
- 1967–1968: Brønshøj
- 1969: Glostrup IC
- 1970–1971: AB
- 1972–1975: Lyngby
- 1976: Glostrup IF32
- 1977–1979: Brøndby
- 1980: Glostrup IF32
- 1981–1986: Lyngby
- 1987–1988: Ølstykke
- 1989–1990: KB
- 1991: B 1903
- 1996–2000: Denmark Women

Jørgen Hvidemose (Danish pronunciation: [ˈjɶːʌn ˈviːðəˌmoːsə]; born 12 May 1940) is a Danish municipal politician and former football manager. He led Lyngby Boldklub to the Danish championship in 1983 and won the Danish Cup with the club in 1984 and 1985.

== Managerial career ==
Hvidemose made his breakthrough as a coach in the 1st Division (first-tier) for Akademisk Boldklub (AB) at just 30 years old in 1970. The club was only one goal short of winning the Danish championship, which instead went to B 1903 on the last matchday. He became head coach of lower tier Lyngby Boldklub in 1972 and led them to promotion to the 2nd Division (second-tier) in 1974. He repeated this feat in 1977, where he as head coach of Brøndby IF ensured the club's promotion to the 2nd Division – a crucial promotion for Brøndby, as professional football was introduced in Denmark the following year. Hvidemose was dismissed from his position halfway through the 1979 season after which Tom Køhlert took over.

In 1981, Hvidemose returned as head coach of Lyngby. In his first season in charge, the club managed to finish in second place in the 1st Division. Two years later, the club won its first Danish championship, and Hvidemose also led the team to two Danish Cup wins in both 1984 and 1985. In 1989, he was appointed as the new coach of Kjøbenhavns Boldklub (KB), and manage to win promotion from the 2nd Division once again. In total, Hvidemose managed to achieve eight promotions with different clubs during his career.

In 1996, Hvidemose signed a contract with the Danish Football Association (DBU) to manage the Danish women's national team, which under his leadership qualified for the UEFA Women's Euro 1997 and the 1999 FIFA Women's World Cup.

== Political career ==
Hvidemose was elected to the Ølstykke Municipality city council in 1993 as a representative of the Social Democrats. In 2005, he was elected to the city council in the newly created Egedal Municipality – which Ølstykke had merged into as part of the Kommunalreformen ("The Municipal Reform" of 2007). He was a representative there until 2013. From 2010, he became an independent member of the city council.
