= Tom Køhlert =

Danish footballer and manager (born 1947)

Personal information
- Full name: Tom Køhlert
- Date of birth: 30 April 1947 (age 79)
- Place of birth: Glostrup, Denmark
- Position: Defender

Team information
- Current team: Gilleleje FK

Youth career
- AB
- Glostrup IF32
- Brøndbyvester

Senior career*
Years	Team	Apps	(Gls)
1966–1971	Brøndby	62	(1)

Managerial career
- 1972–1979: Brøndby
- 1979: Brøndby (assistant)
- 1979–1985: Brøndby
- 1986–1990: Roskilde
- 1999: Brøndby (caretaker)
- 2002: Brøndby (caretaker)
- 2007–2008: Brøndby
- 2011–2016: Vallensbæk IF
- 2016–2018: FC Gribskov
- 2018–2019: Gilleleje FK
- * Club domestic league appearances and goals

Tom Køhlert (Danish pronunciation: [ˈtsʰʌmˀ ˈkʰøːlˀʌt]; born 30 April 1947) is a Danish football manager and former player who managed Brøndby IF from 1979 to 1985 and several times later as a caretaker. He led the club to its first ever Danish championship in 1985. He has also functioned as a caretaker for the club's first team on two occasions.

== Playing career ==
A Brøndby IF club legend, Køhlert began his career as a player for Akademisk Boldklub (AB) before shortly moving to Glostrup IF 32 and finally to the former Brøndbyvester IF. A year later, Brøndbyvester merged with Brøndbyøster IF and became Brøndby IF, where he made his debut in 1966. He later stated, that he was not an ambitious player, refusing to train three times a week when new Brøndby coach John Sinding took over.

In 1971, after making 62 appearances for Brøndby, Køhlert retired due to persistent knee injuries.

== Managerial career ==
Køhlert was appointed as a youth coach in Brøndby by chairman and former teammate, Per Bjerregaard, in 1972. After training different youth teams, he was promoted to first-team head coach in 1979 after having led the team to a fifth-place finish the season before, as former head coach Jørgen Hvidemose had been sacked. He led the club to its first Danish championship in 1985, Køhlert then left the position, as star players such as Michael Laudrup moved away and increasing media attention had changed his role as head coach.

In 1986, Køhlert took the position as head coach for Roskilde in the second division, a team he coached for more than three years. In 1990, he returned as a youth coach for Brøndby.

Køhlert would return to first-team management in 1999, taking over as a caretaker manager after former head coach Ebbe Skovdahl had left for Aberdeen and his replacement, Åge Hareide, would only start on 1 January 2000. After Hareide proved a mismatch as a Brøndby coach, Køhlert once again took over as caretaker in the spring of 2002, leading the club to its ninth championship.

After leaving professional management, he coached the first team of lower-tier clubs Vallensbæk IF, FC Gribskov and Gilleleje FK.

== Honours ==
Brøndby

- 1st Division / Superliga (2): 1985, 2001–02
- 2nd Division: 1981
- Carlsberg Grand Prix: 1984
