= Allerød FK =

Football club in Lillerød, Denmark

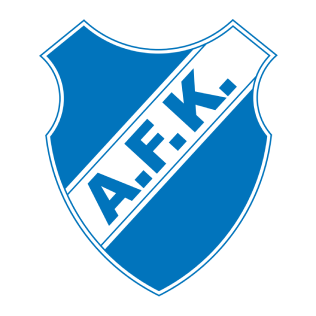
- Full name: Allerød Fodbold Klub
- Founded: 12 July 1927; 99 years ago
- Ground: Allerød Idrætspark, Lillerød
- Capacity: 2,000
- Chairman: Henrik Greve
- Head coach: Dennis Foss
- League: Denmark Series
- 2023–24: Denmark Series – Group 1, 5th of 10; Promotion group East, 9th of 10
- Website: alleroedfk.dk
Home colours	Away colours

Allerød Fodbold Klub is an association football club based in Lillerød, Denmark, that competes in the Denmark Series, the fifth tier of the Danish football league system. Founded in 1922, it is affiliated to the regional DBU Zealand football association. The team plays its home matches at Allerød Idrætspark, which has a capacity of 2,000.

Founded as Lillerød IF on 12 July 1927, the club was a part of the first Danish Cup tournament in 1955, and made two further cup appearances in 1983 and 1991. On 1 January 2004, the club changed its name to Allerød FK.

== History ==
=== Early decades ===
Around 1918–20, Lillerød Boldklub was founded, mainly featuring men's and women's gymnastics. In 1927, the various associations merged and formed Lillerød Idrætsforening (Lillerød IF). The club had a joint board, which looked after the interests of all sport disciplines.

As there was high unemployment at the time, the parish council used, as an aid to the club, one of the many crisis laws where one could receive state subsidies for school sports grounds. Grants were sought on the grounds that the pitch was also to be used as a sports track for the local school (Lillerød School). This was granted and in 1934 the pitch was ready and the clubhouse was built at the end of what would later be called V. Heisesvej. For the next 19 years, Lillerød Idrætsforening was responsible for the maintenance of the grounds and the clubhouse. To secure a regular income, a football match was organised every summer where the city's bourgeoisie played against each other.

In 1951, Lillerød Municipality took over the pitches and clubhouse and the club was thus exempted from bearing the costs of maintenance. At Lillerød IF's general assembly on 28 January 1953 held at Lillerød School, a proposal was adopted to divide the sports club into subdivisions with their own board and a main board consisting of a representative from each subdivision. The adoption of the proposal meant that extraordinary general assemblies had to be held for the individual departments, e.g. table tennis, football, handball, gymnastics and orienteering. The football club's extraordinary general assembly was held at Mølcks Konditori on 10 February 1953 and Eigil Petersen was elected as the football club's first chairman. In 1969, the current Skovvang Stadium with its associated clubhouse was inaugurated. There was a joint march through the town from Lillerød School and in the afternoon an exhibition game was played against Akademisk Boldklub (AB).

The final design of the ground had taken a long time. Since the early 1960s, there had been a vocal support in the town for an indoor arena to be constructed in the city. In the original project, this arena was intended to be located where the old stadium with its clubhouse had been located in 1934. However, after some debate, the desired location for the arena was changed.

=== Recent years ===
The club changed its name to Allerød FK on 1 January 2004, aligning it with the name of the municipality.

On 29 August 2007, Allerød played Brøndby IF in the second round of the Danish Cup, losing 1–4 at home in front of 3,510 spectators. Peter Madsen scored a brace for the away side, with Kasper Lorentzen and David Williams scoring the other goals. At that point, Brøndby legend Bjarne Jensen had recently left the coaching position after having led the team from the Zealand Series to the fourth-tier Denmark Series.

Allerød FK reached promotion to the third-tier Danish 2nd Division ahead the 2009–10 season, where they finished second in their Denmark Series group after a 4–3 win over Nivå-Kokkedal FK on 14 June 2009. This was the second time in club history, that they reached the third tier, after having played six months in the division before in 1995 when the league structure was reorganised in Danish football.
