= Jan Bartram =

Danish footballer (born 1962)

Personal information
- Full name: Jan Lewis Bartram
- Date of birth: 6 March 1962 (age 64)
- Place of birth: Frederiksberg, Denmark
- Height: 1.88 m (6 ft 2 in)
- Position: Midfielder

Senior career*
| Years | Team | Apps | (Gls) |
| 1982–1987 | AGF | 127 | (18) |
| 1988 | Rangers | 11 | (3) |
| 1988 | Brøndby IF | 14 | (2) |
| 1988–1991 | Bayer 05 Uerdingen | 74 | (9) |
| 1991–1996 | AGF | 49 | (7) |
| Total | | 275 | (39) |

International career
| 1985–1991 | Denmark | 32 | (5) |
- * Club domestic league appearances and goals

Jan Lewis Bartram (born 6 March 1962 as Jan Louis Bartram) is a Danish former professional association football player in the midfielder position. He played for Scottish team Rangers and Bayer 05 Uerdingen in Germany, as well as Danish teams AGF and Brøndby IF. He earned 32 caps and scored five goals for the Denmark national team and was in the Danish squad for the 1986 FIFA World Cup.

== Club career ==
Bartram signed his first contract with Aarhus Gymnastik Forening (AGF) in 1982. He got his national breakthrough with AGF in the top-flight Danish 1st Division championship as a left-sided attacking midfielder, and helped the club win the 1986 1st Division championship. After the 1987 First Division season, he moved to play abroad.

He signed for Scottish club Rangers, but his stay was a short one. He was assured by Rangers manager Graeme Souness that he would fit into his tactics, but found himself deployed as a strictly defensive full back. He gained some notoriety for having his thoughts on Souness published in an interview with Danish paper Ekstra Bladet, allegedly calling Souness a beast or hooligan. He and Souness denounced the interview together, but Bartram repeated some of the accusations in his 1998 autobiography. He left Rangers after six months, in the summer of 1988.

He moved back to Denmark, and signed for defending Danish champions Brøndby IF. He stayed there for less than half a year, playing a total 23 games for the club. Bartram was soon sold on to Bayer 05 Uerdingen in the German Bundesliga by Brøndby CEO Per Bjerregaard, in a deal which yielded a DKK3.5 million surplus for Brøndby. He made his Uerdingen debut in November 1988 and played 74 games in his three seasons at the club, playing alongside fellow Danish international and former Brøndby player Brian Laudrup. Bartram did not take to the strict discipline of new coach Timo Konietzka and played his last Uerdingen game in March 1991, before he was fired for arriving late at a training session.

He moved back to AGF in the Danish top-flight, now known as the Danish Superliga, and made his Superliga debut for AGF in April 1991. He played 14 Superliga games until June 1991, when he took a sabbatical year away from football, and travelled around the world. He returned to AGF's Superliga team in August 1992, and played a further 35 games for the club until April 1996. From May 1994 to June 1996 he was also AGF's sports director.

== International career ==
Bartram made his international debuted for the Denmark national team in January 1985. Having played three internationals, he was included in the Danish team for the 1986 FIFA World Cup, though he did not play any games at the tournament. He was a mainstay in the national team during his many club changes. Following three games in the qualification campaign for Euro 1992, Bartram decided to quit the national team in November 1990 alongside Brian Laudrup and Michael Laudrup, but he returned to the team for a game in April 1991. He played his last national team game in May 1991, having participated in 32 national team games and scored five international goals.
