= Egon Knudsen =

Danish footballer (1915–1994)

Personal information
- Date of birth: 15 March 1915
- Date of death: 24 June 1994 (aged 79)

International career
Years	Team	Apps	(Gls)
1938–1940	Denmark	2	(0)

Egon Knudsen (15 March 1915 – 24 June 1994) was a Danish footballer. He played in two matches for the Denmark national football team from 1938 to 1940.
