= Birger Peitersen =

Danish football manager (born 1945)

Personal information
- Full name: Birger Bloch Peitersen
- Date of birth: 7 March 1945 (age 81)
- Place of birth: Aarhus, Denmark
- Position: Midfielder

Senior career*
Years	Team	Apps	(Gls)
196?–196?	IK Skovbakken		
1969–1972	Helsingør IF		

Managerial career
- 1978–1981: Helsingør IF
- 1985–1988: Denmark Women
- 1987–1988: Brøndby IF
- * Club domestic league appearances and goals

Birger Bloch Peitersen (Danish pronunciation: [ˈpiwɐ ˈplʌk ˈpʰɑjˀtʌsn̩]; born 7 March 1945) is a Danish former football manager and player. After his career in football, he featured as a sports pundit. He is currently employed at the Department of Sports at the University of Copenhagen.

== Career ==
After playing as a midfielder for IK Skovbakken and Helsingør IF, Peitersen graduated in Sports and History degrees at the University of Copenhagen in 1972. He then went on to become a sports consultant in Zambia for the Danish International Development Agency (DANIDA). In 1975, Peitersen became employed as a gymnasie (high school) teacher at Rungsted Gymnasium, before joining the UCPH Department of Nutrition, Exercise and Sports in 1981.

As a player, Peitersen made appearances for Skovbakken in the 2nd Division (third-tier). In 1978, he started his career in management as the head coach of Helsingør IF, a position he held until starting at the UCPH Department of Nutrition, Exercise and Sports. From 1985 until 1988, he was the coach of the Denmark women's national football team. In 1987, he shortly coached Brøndby IF after the departure of Ebbe Skovdahl to Benfica, where he led the team to the Danish championship in the same year. He worked as Brøndby's head coach alongside his position as women's national team coach, but stopped in Brøndby when Skovdahl returned to his former position in the following year.

Since 1984, Peitersen has been a pundit on several Danish television channels, including DR, TV3 and Kanal 5. He retired from punditry in 2010.

== Honours ==
Brøndby

- 1st Division^{(I)}: 1987
