= Thomas Thorninger =

Danish footballer (born 1972)

Personal information
- Full name: Thomas Thorninger
- Date of birth: 20 October 1972 (age 54)
- Place of birth: Denmark
- Height: 1.80 m (5 ft 11 in)
- Positions: Attacking midfielder; forward

Youth career
- ????–1988: Holstebro
- 1989–1990: PSV Eindhoven

Senior career*
Years	Team	Apps	(Gls)
1990–1992	Vejle Boldklub	41	(12)
1992–1994	PSV	9	(0)
1994–1997	AGF	90	(45)
1998	Perugia	0	(0)
1998–2001	Copenhagen	108	(18)
2002–2003	Udinese	1	(0)
2003–2004	AGF	35	(9)
Total		284	(84)

International career
1994–1997	Denmark U21	3	(2)
- * Club domestic league appearances and goals

Thomas Thorninger (born 20 October 1972) is a Danish former football player. He played for PSV Eindhoven in the Netherlands, Italian clubs Perugia Calcio and Udinese Calcio, as well as Vejle Boldklub, AGF Aarhus and F.C. Copenhagen in Denmark. He played three games and scored two goals for the Denmark national under-21 football team.

== Honours ==
- AGF Aarhus :
  - Danish Cup: 1996
  - Danish Superliga topscorer: 1995–96
- FC København :
  - Danish championship: 2000–01
  - Danish Super Cup: 2001
