= 2001–02 Danish Superliga =

12th season of Danish Superliga

SAS Ligaen
- Season: 2001–02
- Champions: Brøndby IF
- Relegated: Vejle BK; Lyngby FC

The 2001–02 Danish Superliga season was the 12th season of the Danish Superliga league championship, governed by the Danish Football Association. It took place from the first match on July 21, 2001, to final match on May 16, 2002.

The Danish champions qualified for the second UEFA Champions League 2002–03 qualification round, while the second and third placed teams qualified for the first qualification round of the UEFA Cup 2002–03. The fourth placed team qualified for the UEFA Intertoto Cup 2002, while the two lowest placed teams of the tournament was directly relegated to the Danish 1st Division. Likewise, the Danish 1st Division champions and runners-up were promoted to the Superliga.

== Table ==
Pos	Team	Pld	W	D	L	GF	GA	GD	Pts	Qualification or relegation
1	Brøndby IF (C)	33	20	9	4	74	28	+46	69	Qualification to Champions League second qualifying round
2	FC København	33	20	9	4	62	25	+37	69	Qualification to UEFA Cup qualifying round
3	FC Midtjylland	33	16	9	8	47	27	+20	57	Qualification to UEFA Cup qualifying round
4	Aalborg BK	33	16	6	11	52	45	+7	54	
5	AB Copenhagen	33	13	11	9	48	38	+10	50	Qualification to Intertoto Cup first round
6	Odense BK	33	13	10	10	56	51	+5	49	Qualification to UEFA Cup qualifying round (Note: OB qualified for UEFA Cup qualifying round by winning the 2001–02 Danish Cup.)
7	Esbjerg fB	33	13	6	14	42	44	−2	45	
8	Viborg FF	33	10	11	12	46	45	+1	41	
9	Silkeborg IF	33	8	8	17	41	50	−9	32	
10	Aarhus GF	33	7	10	16	42	56	−14	31	
11	Vejle BK (R)	33	6	10	17	38	72	−34	28	Relegation to Danish 1st Division
12	Lyngby BK (R)	33	2	9	22	25	92	−67	15	Relegation to Danish 1st Division

Rules for classification: 1) points; 2) goal difference; 3) number of goals scored.
(C) Champions; (R) Relegated

== Results ==
Home \ Away	AB	AGF	BIF	EFB	FCK	FCM	LBK	OB	SIF	VB	VFF	AAB	AB	AGF	BIF	EFB	FCK	FCM	LBK	OB	SIF	VB	VFF	AAB
AB		0–0	1–3	2–0	2–2	0–1	3–1	4–3	1–0	4–0	1–2	1–0		1–0	1–2	0–0			3–0				1–2	
AGF	1–1		1–2	1–6	1–2	0–1	7–0	0–1	2–2	3–0	4–3	1–3						2–3		1–3	4–0	0–0		2–2
Brøndby IF	5–0	5–0		1–0	2–0	1–2	2–0	2–0	4–0	2–1	0–0	0–0		2–2			1–0			4–1	0–1	6–1	2–2	
Esbjerg fB	1–2	4–1	0–7		2–1	0–1	5–0	2–0	1–1	1–1	1–0	0–1		2–0	0–2		1–3			2–0		0–2		
FC Copenhagen	0–2	3–0	1–1	6–0		1–1	1–0	1–1	2–1	4–1	2–1	3–0	0–0	0–0					4–1	4–0		2–1	2–1	
FC Midtjylland	2–2	2–0	1–1	0–2	0–0		0–0	0–1	1–0	5–0	1–1	0–1	2–0		1–3	1–1	0–1		4–0				3–1	
Lyngby BK	0–1	1–1	1–0	2–0	0–3	0–4		2–2	0–5	2–5	2–2	0–7		0–1	2–2	0–2				2–3			1–5	
Odense BK	2–2	5–0	4–3	2–1	1–1	0–2	4–0		3–1	5–1	0–1	0–2	2–2					2–1			2–1	1–0		1–2
Silkeborg IF	1–1	1–0	1–2	3–4	0–2	0–1	0–0	2–2		1–0	1–1	1–2	1–1			0–0	0–1	2–3	5–2					2–0
Vejle BK	1–1	0–3	1–1	2–0	1–3	1–1	2–2	1–1	3–0		1–2	1–3	0–4					0–0	2–2		0–4			4–2
Viborg FF	2–1	0–0	1–1	0–2	0–2	2–1	1–1	2–2	2–0	1–2		2–3		0–0		0–1				1–1	3–2	4–1		0–1
AaB	0–2	1–4	1–3	2–1	1–1	2–1	2–1	1–1	0–2	2–2	2–1		2–1		1–2	0–0	2–4	0–1	4–0					

Source: Danskfodbold.com

== Top goalscorers ==
Rank	Player	Club	Goals
1	(Denmark) Peter Madsen	Brøndby IF	22
1	(Denmark) Kaspar Dalgas	Odense BK	22
3	(Denmark) Morten Skoubo	FC Midtjylland	19
4	(Denmark) Bo Nielsen	Silkeborg IF	15
5	(Denmark) Ruben Bagger	Brøndby IF	13
5	(Denmark) Søren Frederiksen	Viborg FF	13
5	(Estonia) Indrek Zelinski	Aalborg BK	13
8	(Nigeria) Abdul Sule	AB Copenhagen	11
8	(Denmark) Thomas Frandsen	Viborg FF	11
8	(Australia) Sasho Petrovski	Viborg FF	11

== Attendances ==
No.	Club	Average	Highest
1	Brøndby IF	15,168	28,116
2	FC København	14,784	40,186
3	AaB	7,113	13,516
4	AGF	6,644	19,279
5	OB	4,860	7,795
6	Esbjerg fB	4,065	9,334
7	Silkeborg IF	3,166	6,513
8	Vejle BK	2,982	5,830
9	FC Midtjylland	2,634	5,505
10	AB	2,627	6,017
11	Viborg FF	2,381	6,031
12	Lyngby BK	1,585	5,393

== See also ==
- 2001-02 in Danish football
