= 1985 Danish 1st Division =

40th season of Danish 1st Division

Danish 1st Division
- Season: 1985

The 1985 Danish 1st Division season was the 40th season of the Danish 1st Division league championship, governed by the Danish Football Association.

The Danish champions qualified for the European Cup 1986-87 qualification, while the second placed team qualified for the qualification round of the UEFA Cup 1986-87. The four lowest placed teams of the tournament was directly relegated to the Danish 2nd Division. Likewise, the Danish 2nd Division champions and runners-up were promoted to the 1st Division.

== Table ==
Pos	Team	Pld	W	D	L	GF	GA	GD	Pts
1	Brøndby IF	30	16	11	3	50	27	+23	43
2	Lyngby BK	30	15	7	8	49	36	+13	37
3	Aarhus GF	30	15	6	9	54	30	+24	36
4	Odense BK	30	15	5	10	52	43	+9	35
5	Herfølge BK	30	12	9	9	47	37	+10	33
6	Næstved IF	30	13	6	11	48	43	+5	32
7	Vejle BK	30	12	8	10	41	41	0	32
8	Esbjerg fB	30	11	9	10	49	42	+7	31
9	Kastrup BK	30	12	6	12	35	37	−2	30
10	Brønshøj BK	30	12	6	12	47	55	−8	30
11	Ikast FS	30	11	7	12	54	48	+6	29
12	B 1903	30	11	7	12	46	43	+3	29
13	BK Frem	30	11	5	14	40	51	−11	27
14	Hvidovre IF	30	9	5	16	33	40	−7	23
15	Køge BK	30	6	5	19	21	68	−47	17
16	B.93	30	5	6	19	28	53	−25	16

== Results ==
Home \ Away	AGF	B93	B03	BIF	BBK	EfB	BKF	HBK	HIF	IFS	KAS	KBK	LBK	NIF	OB	VBK
Aarhus GF	—	3–2	0–0	0–1	2–0	1–0	3–2	2–2	0–1	3–1	1–2	6–0	1–3	2–2	6–1	0–0
B.93	0–2	—	1–2	0–1	1–1	0–2	0–1	0–2	4–1	1–2	0–3	1–1	1–2	0–1	2–1	3–0
B 1903	0–4	0–0	—	0–1	5–1	3–0	0–0	0–1	3–0	2–1	1–3	4–2	2–2	1–2	2–2	5–2
Brøndby IF	0–0	3–0	3–3	—	5–2	1–3	0–1	4–3	0–0	0–0	0–2	2–1	1–0	2–2	3–2	2–0
Brønshøj BK	1–5	1–0	3–2	2–5	—	0–0	3–1	0–0	1–0	5–1	0–0	4–1	0–3	2–2	1–1	1–3
Esbjerg fB	2–3	1–1	0–0	1–1	1–3	—	2–1	3–1	3–1	1–2	3–0	6–0	2–3	3–2	3–1	1–3
BK Frem	1–0	2–1	3–0	0–3	2–3	1–1	—	0–0	1–3	1–5	3–1	4–1	3–1	1–2	0–1	1–0
Herfølge BK	1–0	2–0	4–2	0–0	4–1	2–2	4–0	—	2–1	2–3	0–0	1–2	0–2	1–0	0–0	2–2
Hvidovre IF	3–1	1–0	0–1	1–3	0–3	0–0	0–2	1–1	—	4–0	0–1	4–0	1–2	3–0	0–1	2–3
Ikast FS	0–1	4–0	1–0	1–1	1–3	3–3	4–0	3–0	1–1	—	0–2	7–0	2–1	2–2	1–2	0–1
Kastrup BK	2–0	0–2	1–2	0–1	1–0	3–1	2–2	0–4	2–1	1–3	—	0–1	0–1	2–0	1–2	0–0
Køge BK	0–4	0–2	2–1	0–0	2–3	0–1	1–1	0–3	0–0	3–1	1–0	—	0–2	1–1	0–1	0–2
Lyngby BK	1–0	1–1	0–1	1–1	2–0	0–1	4–2	3–1	2–0	2–2	2–2	0–1	—	0–2	1–1	2–1
Næstved IF	1–2	2–2	3–1	0–1	2–0	3–2	3–1	3–1	1–2	3–2	4–0	2–1	1–2	—	0–2	0–1
Odense BK	0–1	6–2	1–0	2–2	1–0	3–1	2–1	1–3	0–1	2–0	1–3	4–0	5–3	1–2	—	1–3
Vejle BK	1–1	5–1	0–3	0–3	2–3	0–0	1–2	2–0	2–1	1–1	1–1	1–0	1–1	2–0	1–4	—

Legend: Blue = home team win; Yellow = draw; Red = away team win.

== Top goalscorers ==
Position	Player	Club	Goals
1	Lars Bastrup	Ikast FS	20
