= 1995–96 Danish Superliga =

6th season of Danish Superliga

Danish Superliga
- Season: 1995–96
- Dates: 30 July 1995 – 27 May 1996
- Champions: Brøndby IF
- Relegated: Ikast FC; Næstved Boldklub
- UEFA Champions League: Brøndby IF
- UEFA Cup Winners' Cup: Aarhus GF
- UEFA Cup: Odense Boldklub; Lyngby Boldklub
- UEFA Intertoto Cup: Aalborg BK; Silkeborg IF; FC København
- Matches: 363
- Goals: 579 (1.6 per match)

The 1995–96 Danish Superliga season was the 6th season of the Danish Superliga league championship, governed by the Danish Football Association.

The Danish champions qualified for the UEFA Champions League 1996-97 qualification, while the second and third placed teams qualified for the qualification round of the UEFA Cup 1996-97. The fourth, fifth and sixth placed teams qualified for the UEFA Intertoto Cup 1996, while the two lowest placed teams of the tournament was directly relegated to the Danish 1st Division. Likewise, the Danish 1st Division champions and runners-up were promoted to the Superliga. However, the 1st, the 3rd, the 4th, and the 6th played the UEFA Cup after the preliminary rounds.

== Table ==
Pos	Team	Pld	W	D	L	GF	GA	GD	Pts	Qualification or relegation
1	Brøndby IF (C)	33	20	7	6	71	32	+39	67	Qualification to Champions League qualifying round
2	Aarhus GF	33	18	12	3	61	28	+33	66	Qualification to Cup Winners' Cup first round
3	Odense BK	33	17	9	7	57	33	+24	60	Qualification to UEFA Cup qualifying round
4	Lyngby FC	33	14	11	8	61	35	+26	53	Qualification to UEFA Cup qualifying round
5	Aalborg BK	33	15	6	12	57	38	+19	51	Qualification to Intertoto Cup group stage
6	Silkeborg IF	33	14	7	12	44	42	+2	49	Qualification to Intertoto Cup group stage
7	FC København	33	13	9	11	48	49	−1	48	Qualification to Intertoto Cup group stage
8	Viborg FF	33	9	11	13	48	67	−19	38	
9	Vejle BK	33	8	9	16	34	50	−16	33	
10	Herfølge BK	33	6	9	18	41	62	−21	27	
11	Ikast FS (R)	33	5	10	18	28	63	−35	25	Relegation to Danish 1st Division
12	Næstved IF (R)	33	5	8	20	29	80	−51	23	Relegation to Danish 1st Division

Rules for classification: 1) points; 2) goal difference; 3) number of goals scored.
(C) Champions; (R) Relegated

== Results ==
Home \ Away	AGF	BIF	FCK	HBK	IFS	LYN	NÆV	OB	SIF	VEJ	VFF	AAB	AGF	BIF	FCK	HBK	IFS	LYN	NÆV	OB	SIF	VEJ	VFF	AAB
AGF		3–1	2–0	3–0	3–0	2–1	3–0	2–2	0–0	0–0	1–1	1–0		3–3	2–1	1–1	1–1		3–1	1–1				
Brøndby IF	1–2		1–4	3–2	1–0	2–2	6–1	1–1	4–1	4–0	4–0	1–0					2–0	1–2			1–1	6–0	1–1	2–0
F.C. Copenhagen	1–3	0–3		0–0	1–1	2–2	3–1	2–1	1–0	1–2	4–1	2–1		0–4		2–1			1–1		1–0		2–0	
Herfølge BK	1–5	0–1	0–3		1–0	2–2	2–0	1–2	5–2	2–4	3–3	1–1		0–0			4–1	1–1				1–1	2–2	
Ikast FS	2–2	1–2	4–2	1–0		0–4	1–2	1–3	1–0	2–1	1–1	0–3			1–1			0–5			1–2		0–0	1–1
Lyngby FC	0–1	1–3	2–2	2–0	3–2		1–1	0–2	1–2	3–0	4–0	0–0	0–2		4–0				2–0	0–1	2–3	1–1		
Næstved IF	2–4	0–1	2–2	3–2	1–1	1–4		0–4	1–0	0–0	6–2	1–1		0–1		0–4	0–2			1–1		1–0		
OB	1–0	0–3	0–0	0–2	2–0	2–2	5–0		1–0	1–0	3–1	1–1		2–0	2–1	5–1	2–0						3–1	5–1
Silkeborg IF	0–3	2–0	3–1	1–0	1–1	1–1	5–0	2–1		1–2	0–2	2–1	2–1			1–0			1–1	1–1		3–1		
Vejle BK	0–0	1–3	0–1	2–1	1–1	0–3	2–0	1–1	1–1		3–3	1–3	0–1		1–2		5–0			2–0			0–1	
Viborg FF	1–1	2–2	2–2	2–1	3–1	0–2	4–0	2–1	0–3	0–2		4–0	0–0					0–2	6–2		2–1			0–2
AaB	2–4	0–3	1–0	4–0	3–0	0–1	4–0	3–0	4–1	1–0	8–1		2–1			4–0		1–1	2–0		0–1	2–0		

Source: Danskfodbold.com

== Top goal scorers ==
Rank	Player	Club	Goals
1	(Denmark) Thomas Thorninger	Aarhus GF	20
2	(Denmark) Per Pedersen	Odense BK	16
2	(Denmark) Steffen Højer	Viborg FF	16
4	(Denmark) Peter Møller	Brøndby IF	15
5	(Denmark) Erik Bo Andersen	Aalborg BK	13
6	(Denmark) Ebbe Sand	Brøndby IF	12
7	(Denmark) Henrik Larsen	Lyngby FC	11
7	(Denmark) Søren Frederiksen	Viborg FF	11
9	(Denmark) David Nielsen	Lyngby FC	10
9	(Denmark) Miklos Molnar	Herfølge BK	10
9	(Norway) Håvard Flo	Aarhus GF	10

== Attendances ==
No.	Club	Average	Highest
1	AGF	12,071	19,800
2	Brøndby IF	11,046	18,302
3	FC København	9,462	39,640
4	AaB	7,842	12,450
5	OB	5,197	11,280
6	Silkeborg IF	4,735	7,724
7	Vejle BK	4,333	9,433
8	Lyngby BK	2,877	7,497
9	Ikast fS	2,794	5,346
10	Viborg FF	2,689	4,923
11	Næstved BK	2,668	7,138
12	Herfølge BK	1,630	4,882

== See also ==
- 1995-96 in Danish football
