= Per Bjerregaard =

Danish doctor and football executive (born 1946)

- Born: Per Anders Bjerregaard Larsen; 23 January 1946 (age 80); Randers, Denmark
- Occupations: Physician; Former chairman and footballer for Brøndby IF; Publisher for Brøndus
- Years active: 1973–2012
- Known for: Brøndby IF
- Spouse: Alice Bjerregaard
- Children: 2
Parents
- Rudolf Larsen
  Association football career
  - Position: Defender
  Youth career
  - 1956–1962: Randers Freja
  - 1962: KB
  - 1962–1964: Brøndbyøster IF
  Senior career*
  Years	Team	Apps	(Gls)
  1964–1973	Brøndby IF		
  - * Club domestic league appearances and goals
  (father)
- Esther Greve (mother)

Per Anders Bjerregaard (Danish pronunciation: [ˈpjɛɐ̯ɑˌkɒˀ]; born 23 January 1946) is a Danish educated physician (cand.med.) and former footballer, executive director and chairman of Danish football club Brøndby IF.

== Career ==
Born in Randers, Bjerregaard moved to Copenhagen where he played football for Brøndby IF. He was the captain of the senior team as well as the player representative at the board of the club in 1972, and in 1973 he stopped his active career and became chairman of the club. Since then, he has held a number of posts in Danish football, including membership of the board of the Danish Football Association from 1979 to 1991 and again from 2002 onward, and he was one of the main forces behind Royal League.

In January 2006, it was estimated he had sold Brøndby players for more than £27.6 million, and in 2005 alone he sold Thomas Kahlenberg (£2.8m), Daniel Agger (£5.8m) and Morten Skoubo (£1.8m) to foreign clubs. He was the Brøndby transfer negotiator, but this function was taken over by his son and former Brøndby player Anders Bjerregaard in 2006. Anders left the job in December 2009.
