= List of Boldklubben Frem seasons =

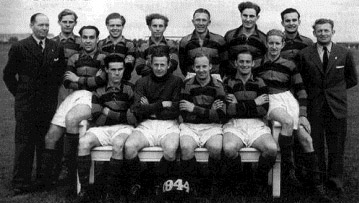
Frem's last Danish championship winning squad in the 1943–44 season. Standing, l-r: Axel Rasmussen (masseur), Svend Frederiksen, Johannes Pløger, Kaj Christiansen, Leo Nielsen, John Hansen, Walther Christensen, and Pauli Jørgensen (coach) Sitting, l-r: Helmuth Søbirk, Hans Colberg, Egon Sørensen (goalkeeper), Leo Christiansen, Erling Sørensen, and Knud Larsen.

Season by season results for Boldklubben Frem.

== Domestic results ==
=== 1880s ===
Season	Tier	Division	Position	Playoff	Significant Events	Cup	Top scorer
1889–90	I	Football Tournament	5th				N/A

=== 1890s ===
Season	Tier	Division	Position	Playoff	Significant Events	Cup	Top scorer
1890–91	I	Football Tournament	4th				N/A
1891–92	I	Football Tournament	4th				N/A
1892–93	I	Football Tournament	3rd				N/A
1893–94	I	Football Tournament	3rd				N/A
1894–95	I	Football Tournament	3rd				N/A
1895–96	Did not participate						
1896–97	I	Football Tournament	5th				N/A
1897–98	I	Football Tournament	4th				N/A
1898–99	I	Football Tournament	2nd-4th				N/A
1899–1900	I	Football Tournament	3rd				N/A

=== 1900s ===
Season	Tier	Division	Position	Playoff	Significant Events	Cup	Top scorer
1900–01	I	Football Tournament	2nd				N/A
1901–02	I	Football Tournament	1st		Unofficial Danish Champions		N/A
1902–03	I	Football Tournament	2nd				N/A
The tournament is now organized by the Copenhagen FA – winners can no longer be considered Danish Champions
1903–04	I	Copenhagen A	1st		Copenhagen Champions		N/A
1904–05	I	Copenhagen A	4th				N/A
1905–06	I	Copenhagen A	2nd				N/A
1906–07	I	Copenhagen A	5th				N/A
1907–08	I	Copenhagen A	2nd				N/A
1908–09	I	Copenhagen A	3rd				N/A
1909–10	I	Copenhagen A	2nd				N/A

=== 1910s ===
Season	Tier	Division	Position	Playoff	Significant Events	Cup	Top scorer
1910–11	I	Copenhagen A	2nd			1st round	N/A
Frem, AB, B 93 and KB created their own piracy league and cup tournaments for the five-month-long season of 1911
1911	I	Baneklubberne	3rd		Baneklubberne Cup Winners	Winners	N/A
1912	I	Copenhagen A	3rd		Frem joined Stævnet	1st round	N/A
National playoffs are introduced – the winners are considered official Danish Champions
1912–13	I	Copenhagen A	3rd	DNQ		Runners-up	N/A
1913–14	I	Copenhagen A	3rd	DNQ		Q/F	N/A
1914–15	I	Copenhagen A	4th	No national playoffs due to World War I		Q/F	N/A
1915–16	I	Copenhagen A	4th	DNQ		1st round	N/A
1916–17	I	Copenhagen A	5th	DNQ		Q/F	N/A
1917–18	I	Copenhagen A	2nd	DNQ		Runners-up	N/A
1918–19	I	Copenhagen A	4th	DNQ		Runners-up	N/A
1919–20	I	Copenhagen A	5th	DNQ		S/F	N/A

=== 1920s ===
Season	Tier	Division	Position	Playoff	Significant Events	Cup	Top scorer
1920–21	I	Copenhagen A	5th	DNQ		Q/F	N/A
1921–22	I	Copenhagen A	2nd	DNQ		Runners-up	N/A
1922–23	I	Copenhagen A	1st	Winners	Danish Champions		N/A
1923–24	I	Copenhagen A	5th	DNQ		Runners-up	N/A
1924–25	I	Copenhagen A	5th	DNQ	Copenhagen Cup Winners	Winners	N/A
1925–26	I	Copenhagen A	3rd	DNQ		S/F	N/A
1926–27	I	Copenhagen A	4th	DNQ	Copenhagen Cup Winners	Winners	N/A
1927–28	I	Danmarksturneringen	1st	1st	Tournament annulled	Q/F	N/A
1928–29	I	Danmarksturneringen	1st	4th		Q/F	N/A
One nationwide league is introduced and playoffs are abandoned
1929–30	I	Mesterskabsserien	2nd			Runners-up	N/A

=== 1930s ===
Season	Tier	Division	Position	Playoff	Significant Events	Cup	Top scorer	
1930–31	I	Mesterskabsserien	1st		Danish Champions	S/F	N/A	
1931–32	I	Mesterskabsserien	5th			Q/F	N/A	
1932–33	I	Mesterskabsserien	1st		Danish Champions	Q/F	N/A	
1933–34	I	Mesterskabsserien	3rd			Runners-up	N/A	
1934–35	I	Mesterskabsserien	2nd			S/F	N/A	
1935–36	I	Mesterskabsserien	1st		Danish Champions	S/F	N/A	
1936–37	I	Mesterskabsserien	2nd				Pauli Jørgensen	19
1937–38	I	Mesterskabsserien	2nd		Copenhagen Cup Winners	Winners	Knud Larsen	16
1938–39	I	Mesterskabsserien	5th			Runners-up		
1939–40	I	Mesterskabsserien	5th		Copenhagen Cup Winners	Winners		

=== 1940s ===
Season	Tier	Division	Position	Playoff	Significant Events	Cup	Top scorer	
Due to World War II the system with regional leagues and national playoffs was re-introduced between 1940 and 1945
1940–41	I	Danmarksturneringen	1st	Winners	Danish Champions		Johannes Pløger	11
1941–42	I	Danmarksturneringen	1st	Q/F			Johannes Pløger	15
1942–43	I	Danmarksturneringen	4th	Q/F	Copenhagen Cup Winners	Winners	Kaj Christiansen	9
1943–44	I	Danmarksturneringen	4th	Winners	Danish Champions	Runners-up	Kaj Christiansen	15
1944–45	I	Danmarksturneringen	4th	S/F			John Hansen	11
1945–46	I	1. Division	4th		Copenhagen Cup Winners	Winners	Kaj Christiansen	9
1946–47	I	1. Division	7th				John Hansen	12
1947–48	I	1. Division	2nd				John Hansen	20
1948–49	I	1. Division	8th				Hansen/Bengtsson	8
1949–50	I	1. Division	6th				Bendt Jørgensen	6

=== 1950s ===
Season	Tier	Division	Position	Playoff	Significant Events	Cup	Top scorer	
1950–51	I	1. Division	6th				Henning Jensen	6
1951–52	I	1. Division	7th				Henning Jensen	6
1952–53	I	1. Division	8th				Ib Bengtsson	5
1953–54	I	1. Division	4th				Henning Jensen	9
The nationwide Danish Cup is introduced
1954–55	I	1. Division	3rd			5th round	Henning Jensen	17
1955–56	I	1. Division	7th		Cup Winners	Winners	Henning Jensen	5
1956–57	I	1. Division	3rd			S/F	Søren Andersen	27
1958	I	1. Division	2nd			4th round	John Hansen	22
1959	I	1. Division	8th			4th round	Søren Andersen	15

=== 1960s ===
Season	Tier	Division	Position	Playoff	Significant Events	Cup	Top scorer	
1960	I	1. Division	12th		Relegated	Q/F	Andersen/Poulsen	8
1961	II	2. Division	4th			S/F	Henning Petersen	9
1962	II	2. Division	5th			2nd round	Leif Nielsen	10
1963	II	2. Division	1st		Promoted	S/F	Leif Nielsen	14
1964	I	1. Division	9th			3rd round	Leif Nielsen	8
1965	I	1. Division	4th			4th round	Leif Nielsen	9
1966	I	1. Division	2nd			Q/F	Leif Nielsen	9
1967	I	1. Division	2nd			4th round	Leif Nielsen	15
1968	I	1. Division	3rd			Q/F	Henning Hansen	13
1969	I	1. Division	9th			Runners-up	Jan B. Poulsen	10

=== 1970s ===
Season	Tier	Division	Position	Playoff	Significant Events	Cup	Top scorer	
1970	I	1. Division	6th			4th round	Ole Mørch	10
1971	I	1. Division	3rd			Runners-up	Jørn Jeppesen	9
1972	I	1. Division	7th			S/F	Jørn Jeppesen	11
1973	I	1. Division	10th			3rd round	Jørn Jeppesen	12
1974	I	1. Division	7th			4th round	Jørn Jeppesen	6
1975	I	1. Division	11th			S/F	Brian Juul-Nielsen	9
1976	I	1. Division	2nd			4th round	Ole Mørch	12
1977	I	1. Division	11th			4th round	Ole Mørch	13
1978	I	1. Division	10th		Cup Winners	Winners	Frank Faber	5
1979	I	1. Division	7th			4th round	Lars Larsen	9

=== 1980s ===
Season	Tier	Division	Position	Playoff	Significant Events	Cup	Top scorer	
1980	I	1. Division	15th		Relegated	3rd round	Anders Sundstrup	7
1981	II	2. Division	4th			Runners-up	Kim Vilfort	15
1982	II	2. Division	1st		Promoted	3rd round	Kim Vilfort	25
1983	I	1. Division	5th			2nd round	Kim Vilfort	19
1984	I	1. Division	12th			S/F	Kim Vilfort	15
1985	I	1. Division	13th		Relegated	Q/F	Kim Vilfort/Bo With	8
1986	II	2. Division	3rd			3rd round	Michael Lyng	15
1987	II	2. Division	4th			1st round	Søren Lyng	18
1988	II	2. Division	2nd		Promoted	Q/F	Michael Lyng	10
1989	I	1. Division	8th			3rd round	Miklos Molnar	14

=== 1990s ===
Season	Tier	Division	Position	Playoff	Significant Events	Cup	Top scorer	
1990	I	1. Division	5th			3rd round	Søren Lyng	13
1991	I	Superligaen	4th			4th round	Søren Lyng	5
1991–92 I	I	Superligaen	6th			4th round	Lars Brøgger	8
1991–92 II	I	Superligaen	3rd			4th round	Jasar/Thøgersen	5
1992–93 I	I	Superligaen	9th		Relegated	S/F	Dan Eggen	5
1992–93 II	II	Kvalifikationsligaen	3rd			S/F	Folkmann/Strudal	7
1993–94 I	II	1. Division	8th		Bankruptcy and demotion	4th round	Christian Clem	6
1994	IV	Denmark Series Pool 2	3rd			4th round	Kenny Sørensen	15
1995	IV	Denmark Series Pool 2	3rd		Promoted	3rd round	Kenny Sørensen	12
1995–96 II	III	2. Division (East)	3rd			3rd round	Kenny Sørensen	7
1996–97 I	III	2. Division (East)	4th			5th round	Casper Larsen	10
1996–97 II	III	2. Division (East)	1st		Promoted	5th round	Casper Larsen	9
1997–98	II	1. Division	9th			1st round	Casper Larsen	11
1998–99	II	1. Division	9th			4th round	Kim Kristensen	12
1999–2000	II	1. Division	7th			4th round	Martin Jeppesen	13

=== 2000s ===
Season	Tier	Division	Position	Playoff	Significant Events	Cup	Top scorer	
2000–01	II	1. Division	4th			4th round	Martin Jeppesen	16
2001–02	II	1. Division	4th			4th round	Mirko Selak	20
2002–03	II	1. Division	2nd		Promoted	4th round	Mirko Selak	18
2003–04	I	Superligaen	11th		Relegated	5th round	Søren Larsen	11
2004–05	II	1. Division	3rd			5th round	Mirko Selak	13
2005–06	II	1. Division	10th			Q/F	Wassim El Banna	13
2006–07	II	1. Division	5th			3rd round	Wassim El Banna	14
2007–08	II	1. Division	11th		Docked 6 points due to compulsory composition	1st round	Tommy Olsen	9
2008–09	II	1. Division	11th			3rd round	Søren Weibel	11
2009–10	II	1. Division	15th		Relegated and went Bankrupt, demoted to Copenhagen Series.	2nd round	Søren Weibel	9

=== 2010s ===
Season	Tier	Division	Position	Playoff	Significant Events	Cup	Top scorer	
2010–11	V	Copenhagen Series	1st		Promoted	DSQ	Simon Sinkjær	23
2011–12	IV	Denmark Series Pool 1	1st		Promoted	2nd round	Nicolaj Harms	18
2012–13	III	2. Division (East)	7th			DNQ	Jeppe Østenkær	9
2013–14	III	2. Division (East)			Pending	2nd round		

== International results ==
=== Inter-Cities Fairs Cup ===
==== 1967–68 ====
===== 1st round =====
13 September 1967
19:00

Boldklubben Frem	0–1	(Spain) Athletic Bilbao
	(Report)	Arroyo 14'

Valby Idrætspark, Copenhagen
Attendance: 6,000
20 September 1967
20:00

Athletic Bilbao (Spain)	3–2	Boldklubben Frem
Arraiz 19'; Uriarte 49'; Arieta 77'	(Report)	Nielsen 20'; Printzlau 56'

San Mamés, Bilbao
Attendance: 30,000
Referee: Jennings (ENG)

Athletic Bilbao won 4-2 on aggregate

=== UEFA Cup Winners' Cup ===
==== 1969–70 ====
===== 1st round =====
17 September 1969
19:00

Boldklubben Frem	2–1	(Switzerland) FC St. Gallen
Hansen 22' 35'	(Report)	Nafziger 16'

Valby Idrætspark, Copenhagen
Attendance: 5,000
Referee: Curt Liedberg (SWE)
1 October 1969
20:30

FC St. Gallen (Switzerland)	1–0	Boldklubben Frem
Cornioley 54'	(Report)

Espenmoos, St. Gallen
Attendance: 4,000
Referee: Janus Birroczky (HUN)

St. Gallen 2-2 Frem on aggregate. St. Gallen won on away goals.

==== 1978–79 ====
===== 1st round =====
13 September 1978
19:00

Boldklubben Frem	2–0	(France) AS Nancy-Lorraine
Jan Jacobsen 28'; Per Hester Hansen 81'	(Report)

Valby Idrætspark, Copenhagen
Attendance: 1,136
Referee: Malcolm Moffatt (NIR)
27 September 1978

AS Nancy-Lorraine (France)	4–0	Boldklubben Frem
Carlos Curbelo 2'; Philippe Jeannol 70' 77'; Bernard Zénier 86'	(Report)

Stade Marcel Picot, Nancy
Attendance: 15,000
Referee: Joaquim Inacio de Almeida (POR)

AS Nancy-Lorraine won 4-2 on aggregate.

=== UEFA Cup ===
==== 1972–73 ====
===== 1st round =====
13 September 1972

FC Sochaux (France)	1–3	Boldklubben Frem
Lechantre 7'	(Report)	Mortensen 39'; Ahlberg 54'; Mørch 62'

Stade Auguste Bonal, Montbéliard
Attendance: 6,452
Referee: Antoine Queudeville (LUX)
27 September 1972
19:00

Boldklubben Frem	2–1	(France) FC Sochaux
Madsen 16'; Mørch 68'	(Report)	Pirrin 86'

Valby Idrætspark, Copenhagen
Attendance: 1,919
Referee: Ronald Jones (WAL)

Boldklubben Frem won 5-2 on aggregate.

===== 2nd round =====
25 October 1972
19:00

Boldklubben Frem	0–5	(Netherlands) FC Twente
	(Report)	Jeuring 1' 7' 55' 60'; Achterberg 83'

Valby Idrætspark, Copenhagen
Attendance: 3,566
Referee: Henry Øberg (NOR)
8 November 1972

FC Twente (Netherlands)	4–0	Boldklubben Frem
Van der Vall 1'; Jeuring 25' 45'; Van de Kerkhof 64'	(Report)

Diekman Stadion, Enschede
Attendance: 9,555
Referee: Ove Dahlberg (SWE)

Twente won 9-0 on aggregate.

==== 1977–78 ====
===== 1st round =====
14 September 1977
19:00

Boldklubben Frem	0–2	(Switzerland) Grasshoppers
	(Report)	Rudolf Elsener 33'; Becker 39'

Valby Idrætspark, Copenhagen
Attendance: 1,956
28 September 1977
20:00

Grasshoppers (Switzerland)	6–1	Boldklubben Frem
Meyer 8' 70'; Becker 40'; Rudolf Elsener 58'; Raimondo Ponte 82' 83'	(Report)	Jørn Mikkelsen 44'

Hardturm, Zürich
Attendance: 3,500
Referee: Horst Brummeier (AUT)

Grasshoppers won 8-1 on aggregate.

==== 1992–93 ====
===== 1st round =====
15 September 1992
20:00

Neuchâtel Xamax (Switzerland)	2–2	Boldklubben Frem
Beat Sutter 51'; Manfredo 52'	(Report)	Kim Mikkelsen 17'; Stéphane Henchoz 22' (o.g.)

Stade de la Maladière, Neuchâtel
Attendance: 4,000
Referee: Marc Batta (FRA)
29 September 1992
19:00

Boldklubben Frem	4–1	(Switzerland) Neuchâtel Xamax
Haren 14' 32'; Henrik Imre Jensen 16' (pen.); Thøgersen 53'	(Report)	Manfredo 24'

Valby Idrætspark, Copenhagen
Attendance: 3,476
Referee: Marnix Sandra (BEL)

Boldklubben Frem won 6-3 on aggregate.

===== 2nd round =====
22 October 1992
19:00

Boldklubben Frem	0–1	(Spain) Real Zaragoza
	(Report)	Gustavo Poyet 12'

Valby Idrætspark, Copenhagen
Attendance: 2,852
Referee: Andrew Wilson Waddell (SCO)
3 November 1992
21:00

Real Zaragoza (Spain)	5–1	Boldklubben Frem
Dorin Mateuţ 8' 39' 83'; Manuel Pena Escontbela 40' 67'	(Report)	Søren Colding 74'

La Romareda, Zaragoza
Attendance: 3,000
Referee: Arturo Martino (SUI)

Real Zaragoza won 6-1 on aggregate.
