= 2002–03 Danish Cup =

DBU Pokalen (The DBU Cup)

Tournament details
- Country: Denmark

Final positions
- Champions: Brøndby IF
- Runners-up: FC Midtjylland

The 2002–03 Danish Cup was the 49th season of the Danish Cup. The final was played on 29 May 2003.

The cup winner qualified for UEFA Cup qualification.

== First round ==
In first round competed 48 teams from the "series" (2001 Denmark Series and lower) and 16 teams from 2001–02 Danish 2nd Divisions.

Team 1	Score	Team 2
Sorø IF Freja	1–3	Værløse BK
Vejleåparkens BK	2–5	BK Skjold
Trundholm FC	0–3	Nivå-Kokkedal Fodbold
FC Lejre/Ogsted	5–0	Døllefjelde-Musse IF
Fredensborg BI	2–2 (a.e.t.) (4–3 p)	Sundby BK
Amager FF	1–3	Albertslund IF
Stenløse BK	0–1	Ølstykke FC
KFUM Roskilde	1–2	FC Bornholm
Vedbæk BK	2–3	Kalundborg GB
Maribo BK	1–3 (a.e.t.)	FK Prespa
Nykøbing FA	4–0	AB 70
Østerbro IF	0–4	Frederikshavn fI
Tved BK	0–5	Næstved BK
Glostrup FK	1–2	IF Skjold Birkerød
Fremad Amager	6–3	Hellerup IK
Roskilde BK	2–3	B 1908
Søndersø BK	2–2 (a.e.t.) (3–4 p)	Nørre Snede GF
Vinding SF	1–2	Thurø BK
Vejen SF	4–2	Sædding/Guldager IF
Krogsbølle-Roerslev FK	1–4	Næsby BK
Egebjerg IF	0–2	Svendborg fB
Billund IF	2–3	Korup IF
Esbjerg IF 92	1–1 (a.e.t.) (5–4 p)	Dalum IF
BK Marienlyst	0–2	Tårup IF
Løgstør IF	0–7	Nørresundby BK
Dronningborg IF	0–2	Hjørring IF
Brønderslev IF	0–3	FC Nordjylland
Herning KFUM	4–2 (a.e.t.)	Jetsmark IF
Viby IF	2–5	Frederikshavn fI
Søndermarkens IF	2–0	Aalborg Freja
Vildbjerg SF	2–4	Hjørring AIK Frem
Tjørring IF	1–4	Holstebro BK

== Second round ==
In second round competed 32 winning teams from 1st round and 8 teams from 2001–02 Danish 1st Division (no. 9 to 16).

Team 1	Score	Team 2
FC Lejre/Ogsted	0–4	BK Skjold
Næstved BK	4–0	IF Skjold
Fredensborg BI	1–3	Kalundborg GB
BK Prespa	1–0	Værløse BK
Næsby BK	2–1	B.93
B 1908	1–3	Nykøbing FA
FC Bornholm	1–0	Fremad Amager
Albertslund IF	0–3	Hvidovre IF
Frederiksberg BK	1–3 (a.e.t.)	Nivå-Kokkedal Fodbold
Herning KFUM	1–2 (a.e.t.)	Hjørring IF
Holstebro BK	5–3	Korup IF
Nørre Snede GF	2–1	Vejen SF
Esbjerg IF 92	1–7	B 1909
Tårup IF	0–1	Skive IK
Frederikshavn fI	1–4	Kolding FC
Brønshøj BK	1–0 (a.e.t.)	Ølstykke FC
Nørresundby BK	1–2	FC Fredericia
Søndermarkens IF	1–4	Svendborg fB
Hjørring AIK Frem	1–2	FC Aarhus
Thurø BK	0–2	FC Nordjylland

== Third round ==
In third round competed 20 winning teams from 2nd round, 6 teams from 2001–02 Danish 1st Division (no. 3 to 8) and 2 teams from 2001–02 Danish Superliga (no. 11 and 12).

Team 1	Score	Team 2
FC Nordjylland	2–2 (a.e.t.) (4–5 p)	Vejle BK
Randers Freja	3–0	FC Fredericia
Hjørring IF	1–4	FC Aarhus
Holstebro BK	2–0	AC Horsens
Næsby BK	1–2 (a.e.t.)	Skive IK
Nørre Snede GF	0–1	Kolding FC
Svendborg fB	2–6	HFK Sønderjylland
B 1909	2–5 (a.e.t.)	BK Skjold
Lyngby BK	0–3	Herfølge BK
Nivå-Kokkedal Fodbold	2–1	B 1913
BK Prespa	1–0	Hvidovre IF
FC Bornholm	1–4	BK Frem
Nykøbing FA	1–3	Brønshøj BK
Kalundborg GB	2–3	Næstved BK

== Fourth round ==
In fourth round competed 14 winning teams from 3rd round, 2 teams from 2001–02 Danish 1st Division (no. 1 and 2) and 4 teams from 2001–02 Danish Superliga (no. 7 to 10).

Team 1	Score	Team 2
Køge BK	1–3	Esbjerg fB
Kolding FC	0–4	Silkeborg IF
FC Aarhus	2–1	BK Frem
BK Skjold	3–2	Randers Freja
BK Prespa	1–5	Skive IK
Nivå-Kokkedal Fodbold	1–5	Næstved BK
Holstebro BK	0–2	Farum BK
Brønshøj BK	3–4 (a.e.t.)	Herfølge BK
Vejle BK	1–0	HFK Sønderjylland
Viborg FF	3–0	AGF

== Fifth round ==
In fifth round competed 10 winning teams from 4th round and 6 teams from 2001–02 Danish Superliga (no. 1 to 6).

Team 1	Score	Team 2
Næstved BK	2–1 (a.e.t.)	Vejle BK
AaB	3–0	Silkeborg IF
AB	1–2	FC Midtjylland
BK Skjold	1–2	Esbjerg fB
Herfølge BK	0–2	F.C. Copenhagen
Brøndby IF	1–1 (a.e.t.) (5–4 p)	Odense BK
Skive IK	0–2	Farum BK
FC Aarhus	0–3	Viborg FF

== Quarter-finals ==
Team 1	Score	Team 2
Brøndby IF	1–0	F.C. Copenhagen
Viborg FF	5–2	Farum BK
FC Midtjylland	3–1	Esbjerg fB
Næstved BK	1–4	AaB

== Semi-finals ==
The semi finals are played on home and away basis.

Team 1	Agg.	Team 2	1st leg	2nd leg
Brøndby IF	4–1	AaB	1–0	3–1
Viborg FF	2–3	FC Midtjylland	0–0	2–3

== Final ==
The final was played at Parken Stadium.

29 May 2003
15:00 CEST

Brøndby IF	3–0	FC Midtjylland
Dalgas 38'; Bagger 84'; Jørgensen 89'

Parken Stadium, Copenhagen
Attendance: 32,660
Referee: Emil Laursen

== See also ==
- Football in Denmark
- 2002–03 Danish Superliga
- 2002–03 Danish 1st Division
