= 2001–02 Danish Cup =

DBU Pokalen (The DBU Cup)

Tournament details
- Country: Denmark

Final positions
- Champions: Odense BK
- Runners-up: F.C. Copenhagen

The 2001–02 Danish Cup was the 48th season of the Danish Cup. The final was played on 9 May 2002.

The winner qualified for UEFA Cup qualification.

== First round ==
In first round competed 48 teams from the "series" (2000 Denmark Series and lower) and 16 teams from 2000–01 Danish 2nd Divisions.

Team 1	Score	Team 2
Aarup BK	1–3	B 1909
BK Marienlyst	1–2	Dalum IF
Slagelse B&I	0–2	Korup IF
Nyborg G&IF	4–5 (a.e.t.)	Tved BK
Thurø BK	1–2	Svendborg fB
Aalborg Freja	1–2	Vorup Frederiksberg BK
Taars-Ugilt IF	1–3	FC Nordjylland
Dronninglund IF	3–2	Jetsmark IF
Grindsted G&IF	1–2	FC Fredericia
Bov IF	2–1	Vejen SF
Skærbæk BK	2–0	Kolding FC
Ringkøbing IF	0–4	Holstebro BK
Herning KFUM	3–1	Vildbjerg SF
Søndermarkens IF	5–0	Braband IF
Odder IGF	2–4	IK Skovbakken
Silkeborg KFUM	5–2	Viby IF
Nykøbing FA	1–3	Næstved BK
B 1938	0–8	BK Frem Sakskøbing
B 70 Taastrup	3–0	Stensved IF
Dragør BK	2–5	Vedbæk BK
BK Friheden	1–0	Holbæk B&I
Frederiksværk FK	3–8	Glostrup FK
KFUM København	3–0	Måløv BK
Hvalsø IF	2–5	VLI Frederiksberg IF
BK Skjold	4–2	Hellerup IK
Amager FF	1–2	Svogerslev BK
Værløse BK	2–0	Roskilde KFUM
BK Fremad Valby	2–3	AC Ballerup
Thisted FC	3–0	Nørresundby BK
Ringe BK	2–3 (a.e.t.)	Middelfart G&BK
Hjørring AIK Frem	4–3 (a.e.t.)	Frederikshavn fI
FC Bornholm	1–1 (a.e.t.) (3–5 p)	Frederiksberg BK

== Second round ==
In second round competed 32 winning teams from 1st round and 8 teams from 2000–01 Danish 1st Division (no. 9 to 16).

Team 1	Score	Team 2
Søndermarkens IF	1–1 (a.e.t.) (6–5 p)	Thisted FC
B 1909	2–3	FC Aarhus
Skærbæk BK	1–9	Holstebro BK
Middelfart G&BK	0–2	Hjørring AIK Frem
IK Skovbakken	1–0	Vorup Frederiksberg BK
Bov IF	0–8	Skive IK
Herning KFUM	2–3 (a.e.t.)	Korup IF
Dronninglund IF	2–7	FC Nordjylland
Silkeborg KFUM	2–4	Randers Freja
Dalum IF	1–0	FC Fredericia
Vedbæk BK	2–4	BK Skjold
Næstved BK	2–0	IF Skjold Birkerød
Frederiksberg BK	1–4	Ølstykke FC
BK Frem Sakskøbing	3–1	AC Ballerup
Svendborg fB	0–1	Hvidovre IF
Tved BK	0–3	Brønshøj BK
B 70 Taastrup	1–2	Glostrup FK
Svogerslev BK	2–3	Fremad Amager
Værløse BK	2–3 (a.e.t.)	KFUM København
BK Friheden	4–2	VLI Frederiksberg IF

== Third round ==
In third round competed 20 winning teams from 2nd round, 6 teams from 2000–01 Danish 1st Division (no. 3 to 8) and 2 teams from 2000–01 Danish Superliga (no. 11 and 12).

Team 1	Score	Team 2
BK Frem Sakskøbing	1–2	Brønshøj BK
Ølstykke FC	0–1	BK Frem
KFUM København	0–3	Fremad Amager
B.93	1–1 (a.e.t.) (4–3 p)	Herfølge BK
BK Friheden	2–4	BK Skjold
Glostrup FK	0–4	Hvidovre IF
Køge BK	4–2	Farum BK
AC Horsens	2–3	Randers Freja
FC Aarhus	2–4	HFK Sønderjylland
Søndermarkens IF	1–2	Næstved BK
Holstebro BK	3–2	B 1913
Hjørring AIK Frem	1–2	FC Nordjylland
IK Skovbakken	0–1	Dalum IF
Korup IF	2–1	Skive IK

== Fourth round ==
In fourth round competed 14 winning teams from 3rd round, 2 teams from 2000–01 Danish 1st Division (no. 1 and 2) and 4 teams from 2000–01 Danish Superliga (no. 7 to 10).

Team 1	Score	Team 2
FC Nordjylland	0–2	AGF
BK Skjold	1–0 (a.e.t.)	HFK Sønderjylland
Holstebro BK	1–2	Lyngby BK
Vejle BK	1–2	Odense BK
B.93	0–2	Randers Freja
BK Frem	2–3	Esbjerg fB
Korup IF	4–1	Dalum IF
Hvidovre IF	0–0 (a.e.t.) (5–6 p)	Køge BK
Brønshøj BK	0–1	AB
Fremad Amager	0–1	Næstved BK

== Fifth round ==
In fifth round competed 10 winning teams from 4th round and 6 teams from 2000–01 Danish Superliga (no. 1 to 6).

Team 1	Score	Team 2
FC Midtjylland	1–1 (a.e.t.) (2–4 p)	AaB
AGF	1–2	Esbjerg fB
Korup IF	0–0 (a.e.t.) (4–5 p)	Randers Freja
Næstved BK	4–2	Lyngby BK
Køge BK	2–3	AB
Viborg FF	0–2	F.C. Copenhagen
BK Skjold	1–3	Silkeborg IF
Brøndby IF	2–4	Odense BK

== Quarter-finals ==
Team 1	Score	Team 2
Næstved BK	1–5	F.C. Copenhagen
Odense BK	1–1 (a.e.t.) (5–4 p)	AaB
Esbjerg fB	1–0	AB
Randers Freja	3–2	Silkeborg IF

== Semi-finals ==
The semi finals are played on home and away basis.

Team 1	Agg.	Team 2	1st leg	2nd leg
Odense BK	1–0	Randers Freja	1–0	0–0
F.C. Copenhagen	1–0	Esbjerg fB	1–0	0–0

== Final ==
The final was played at Parken Stadium.

9 May 2002
15:00 CEST

F.C. Copenhagen	1–2	Odense BK
Lønstrup 83'		Berg 9'; Siim 12'

Parken Stadium, Copenhagen
Attendance: 28,841
Referee: Tonny K. Poulsen

== See also ==
- Football in Denmark
- 2001–02 Danish Superliga
- 2001–02 Danish 1st Division
