= 2004 Danish Cup final =

- Event: 2003–04 Danish Cup
AaB	Copenhagen
0	1
- Date: 20 May 2004
- Venue: Parken, Copenhagen
- Man of the Match: Hjalte Bo Nørregaard (Copenhagen)
- Referee: Michael Svendsen
- Attendance: 38,095

The 2004 Danish Cup final was the final and deciding match of the 2003–04 Danish Cup. It took place on Thursday 20 May 2004 at Parken Stadium in Copenhagen and saw the Superliga leaders F.C. Copenhagen beat no. 5 in the league Aalborg Boldspilklub (AaB).

F.C. Copenhagen have won the Cup on two previous occasions (1995 and 1997). AaB have won the Cup in 1966 and 1970.

Referee Michael Svendsen officiated the match.

== Road to Copenhagen ==
AaB			F.C. Copenhagen	
Esbjerg fB [DS] A 2–1	Ericsson 64; Lundberg	Fifth round	FC Nordsjælland [SL] A 4–2	Zuma 35; Bisgaard 58; Møller 78; Bergvold 83
Viborg FF [DS] H 2–0	Ericsson 21; Lundberg 63	Quarter finals	Skive IK [2D] A 2–0	Møller 63, 67
Brøndby IF [SL] A 0–0	-	Semi finals First leg	Odense BK [DS] H 3–1	Álvaro 3 Christiansen 54; Jacobsen 78
Brøndby IF [SL] H 2–1	Nielsen; Lundberg	Second leg	Odense BK [DS] A 4–2	Bisgaard 19; Møller 65; Álvaro 74; Traoré 90

- Both teams started in fifth round.
- Square brackets [ ] represent the opposition's division.

== Match facts ==
20 May 2004
15:00 CEST

AaB	0–1	F.C. Copenhagen
		Bisgaard 28'

Parken Stadium, Copenhagen
Attendance: 38,095
Referee: Michael Svendsen

AAB
GK	1	(Denmark) Jimmy Nielsen (C)
RB	16	(Denmark) Allan Olesen
CB	2	(Norway) Bård Borgersen
CB	8	(Norway) Trond Andersen
LB	15	(Denmark) Allan K. Jepsen
RM	9	(Denmark) Thomas Augustinussen	(yellow card) 27' (substituted off) 77'
CM	22	(Denmark) Rasmus Würtz
CM	18	(Sweden) Martin Ericsson
LM	17	(Denmark) Stefan Schmidt
FW	10	(Denmark) David Nielsen
FW	14	(Denmark) Christian Lundberg
Substitutes:
DF	28	(Denmark) Martin Pedersen
DF	4	(Denmark) Jacob Krüger
MF	6	(Denmark) Allan Gaarde	(substituted on) 77'
Manager:
(Sweden) Erik Hamrén

F.C. COPENHAGEN
GK	1	(Sweden) Magnus Kihlstedt
RB	2	(Denmark) Lars Jacobsen
CB	17	(Denmark) Ole Tobiasen
CB	4	(Denmark) Bo Svensson (C)	(yellow card) 22'
LB	15	(Denmark) Peter Christiansen	(yellow card) 20'
RM	8	(Denmark) Michael Silberbauer	(substituted off) 61'
CM	25	(Denmark) Hjalte Nørregaard	(yellow card) 87'
CM	24	(Denmark) Christian Traoré
LM	21	(Denmark) Morten Bisgaard
FW	18	(Brazil) Álvaro Santos	(substituted off) 57'
FW	32	(Denmark) Peter Møller	(red card) 67'
Substitutes:
GK	16	(Hungary) Balázs Rabóczki
FW	12	(Faroe Islands) Todi Jónsson	(substituted on) 57'
FW	27	(Denmark) Jesper Bech	(substituted on) 51'
MF	28	(Denmark) Martin Bergvold
Manager:
(Sweden) Hans Backe

MATCH RULES

- 90 minutes.
- 2 x 15 minutes of extra-time if necessary.
- Penalty shootout if scores still level.
- Four named substitutes
- Maximum of 3 substitutions.

== See also ==
- 2003–04 Danish Cup for details of the current competition.
