= 2004–05 Danish Cup =

DBU Pokalen (The DBU Cup)

Tournament details
- Country: Denmark

Final positions
- Champions: Brøndby IF
- Runners-up: FC Midtjylland

The 2004–05 Danish Cup was the 51st season of the Danish Cup. The first round was played on about 28 July 2004 and the final was played on 5 May 2005.

Brøndby IF ended as cup winner, but as they also won the Danish Superliga, the UEFA Cup-spot went to the cup runner-up FC Midtjylland.

== First round ==
In first round competed 48 teams from the "series" (2003 Denmark Series and lower) and 16 teams from 2003–04 Danish 2nd Divisions.

| Team 1 | Score | Team 2 |
|---|---|---|
24 July 2004
| BK Rødovre | 2–1 | Stenløse BK |
27 July 2004
| Skovlunde Fodbold | 1–4 | Holbæk B&I |
| Holstebro BK | 1–0 | Jetsmark IF |
| Hirtshals BK | 0–2 | Viby IF |
28 July 2004
| FC Bornholm | 3–1 | Slagelse B&I |
| Sorø IF Freja | 1–0 | Døllefjelde-Musse IF |
| Bagsværd BK | 6–1 | Kløvermarkens fB |
| Albertslund IF | 1–2 | FC Roskilde |
| BK Frem Sakskøbing | 1–7 | Lyngby BK |
| Dragør BK | 1–4 | Hvidovre IF |
| BK Avarta | 2–1 | Hellerup IK |
| Nakskov BK | 0–5 | Næsby BK |
| Glostrup FK | 3–2 | Næstved BK |
| Ejby IF | 2–5 | Gladsaxe-Hero BK |
| Husum BK | 3–0 | B 1908 |
| Vanløse IF | 0–1 | Kalundborg GB |
| Allerød FK | 3–2 | Nivå-Kokkedal Fodbold |
| Ishøj BK | 3–5 | Amager FF |
| Tjørring IF | 1–3 | Braband IF |
| Aars IK | 1–4 | Hjørring IF |
| Lystrup IF | 0–5 | Thisted FC |
| Silkeborg KFUM | 2–1 | Aabyhøj IF |
| Søndermarkens IF | 1–3 (a.e.t.) | Skive IK |
| Vejgaard BSK | 2–1 (a.e.t.) | Frederikshavn fI |
| Hammel GF | 3–1 | Hobro IK |
| Skjern GF | 2–1 (a.e.t.) | Korup IF |
| SUB Sønderborg | 1–3 (a.e.t.) | FC Horsens |
| Allesø GF | 1–15 | Kolding FC |
| Varde IF | 3–1 | B 1909 |
| Middelfart G&BK | 5–3 | Bramming BK |
| Tved BK | 1–2 | Dalum IF |
| Stige BK | 0–1 | OKS |

== Second round ==
In second round competed 32 winning teams from 1st round and 8 teams from 2003–04 Danish 1st Division (no. 9 to 16).

| Team 1 | Score | Team 2 |
|---|---|---|
10 August 2004
| Braband IF | 1–8 | B 1913 |
| Aarhus Fremad | 4–2 | Kolding FC |
| FC Roskilde | 4–4 (a.e.t.) (1–3 p) | Brønshøj BK |
| Amager FF | 2–7 | Kalundborg GB |
11 August 2004
| FC Bornholm | 0–3 | Lyngby BK |
| FC Nordjylland | 0–3* | Dalum IF |
| Varde IF | 1–3 | FC Fredericia |
| OKS | 1–3 | Vejle BK |
| Skjern GF | 0–4 | Hjørring IF |
| FC Horsens | 1–3 | Næsby BK |
| Viby IF | 3–2 | Vejgaard BSK |
| Silkeborg KFUM | 2–1 | Skive IK |
| Middelfart G&BK | 3–0 | Holstebro BK |
| Hammel GF | 0–7 | Thisted FC |
| Allerød FK | 1–2 | B.93 |
| Bagsværd BK | 1–4 | Holbæk B&I |
| Husum BK | 1–4 | Glostrup FK |
| BK Rødovre | 2–3 | Gladsaxe-Hero BK |
| Sorø IF Freja | 1–4 | Fremad Amager |
| Hvidovre IF | 1–2 | BK Avarta |

*Dalum won without match.

== Third round ==
In third round competed 20 winning teams from 2nd round, 6 teams from 2003–04 Danish 1st Division (no. 3 to 8) and 2 teams from 2003–04 Danish Superliga (no. 11 and 12).

| Team 1 | Score | Team 2 |
|---|---|---|
1 September 2004
| Brønshøj BK | 2–4 | BK Frem |
7 September 2004
| Silkeborg KFUM | 1–4 | Dalum IF |
| Gladsaxe-Hero BK | 2–7 | Fremad Amager |
8 September 2004
| Viby IF | 0–2 | Næsby BK |
| Middelfart G&BK | 0–5 | Kalundborg GB |
| Aarhus Fremad | 0–5 | SønderjyskE |
| Thisted FC | 0–2 | AC Horsens |
| B 1913 | 5–4 (a.e.t.) | Vejle BK |
| Ølstykke FC | 4–1 | Nykøbing FA |
| Hjørring IF | 1–3 | FC Fredericia |
| Lyngby BK | 2–4 | Køge BK |
| Glostrup FK | 3–2 | Holbæk B&I |
| AB | 0–1 | BK Skjold |
22 September 2004
| BK Avarta | 0–0 (a.e.t.) (5–4 p) | B.93 |

== Fourth round ==
In fourth round competed 14 winning teams from 3rd round, 2 teams from 2003–04 Danish 1st Division (no. 1 and 2) and 4 teams from 2003–04 Danish Superliga (no. 7 to 10).

| Team 1 | Score | Team 2 |
|---|---|---|
28 September 2004
| Næsby BK | 0–1 | Herfølge BK |
29 September 2004
| BK Avarta | 1–2 (a.e.t.) | Ølstykke FC |
| Dalum IF | 0–2 | FC Nordsjælland |
| Kalundborg GB | 1–4 | Køge BK |
| BK Frem | 3–0 | Randers FC |
| Fremad Amager | 3–2 | FC Fredericia |
| AC Horsens | 4–3 (a.e.t.) | Silkeborg IF |
| B 1913 | 2–5 | AGF |
| BK Skjold | 1–0 | Viborg FF |
| Glostrup FK | 1–3 | SønderjyskE |

== Fifth round ==
In fifth round competed 10 winning teams from 4th round and 6 teams from 2003–04 Danish Superliga (no. 1 to 6).

| Team 1 | Score | Team 2 |
|---|---|---|
27 October 2004
| Ølstykke FC | 3–1 | SønderjyskE |
| AC Horsens | 2–1 | AaB |
| BK Frem | 0–2 | BK Skjold |
| Køge BK | 1–2 | AGF |
| Fremad Amager | 3–2 | FC Nordsjælland |
| F.C. Copenhagen | 2–1 | Odense BK |
| Herfølge BK | 1–4 | FC Midtjylland |
| Esbjerg fB | 0–1 | Brøndby IF |

== Quarter-finals ==
| Team 1 | Score | Team 2 |
|---|---|---|
10 November 2004
| Ølstykke FC | 0–3 | FC Midtjylland |
| AC Horsens | 3–1 (a.e.t.) | AGF |
6 March 2005
| BK Skjold | 0–2 | Brøndby IF |
| Fremad Amager | 1–3 | F.C. Copenhagen |

== Semi-finals ==
The semi finals are played on home and away basis. The legs were played on 6 and 20 April 2005.

| Team 1 | Agg. | Team 2 | 1st leg | 2nd leg |
|---|---|---|---|---|
| Brøndby IF | 3–2 | F.C. Copenhagen | 1–0 | 2–2 |
| AC Horsens | 0–5 | FC Midtjylland | 0–4 | 0–1 |

== Final ==
5 May 2005
15:00 CEST

| Brøndby | 3–2 (a.e.t.) | FC Midtjylland |
|---|---|---|
| Skoubo 41'; Daugaard 76'; Bagger 111' | | Hansen 47'; Pimpong 60' |

Parken Stadium, Copenhagen
Attendance: 34,026
Referee: Knud Erik Fisker

== See also ==
- Football in Denmark
- 2004–05 in Danish football
- 2004–05 Danish Superliga
- 2004–05 Danish 1st Division
