= 1997–98 Danish 1st Division =

53rd season of Danish 1st Division

Danish 1st Division
- Season: 1997–98

The 1997–98 Danish 1st Division season was the 53rd season of the Danish 1st Division league championship and the 12th consecutive as a second tier competition governed by the Danish Football Association.

The division-champion and runner-up promoted to the 1998–99 Danish Superliga. The teams in the 13th to 16th spots relegated to the 1998–99 Danish 2nd Division.

== Table ==
Pos	Team	Pld	W	D	L	GF	GA	GD	Pts	Promotion or relegation
1	Viborg FF (C, P)	30	20	7	3	72	29	+43	67	Promotion to Danish Superliga
2	B 93 (P)	30	22	1	7	73	41	+32	67	Promotion to Danish Superliga
3	Herning Fremad	30	20	5	5	72	31	+41	65	
4	Køge BK	30	14	5	11	41	29	+12	47	
5	AC Horsens	30	12	8	10	49	44	+5	44	
6	Esbjerg fB	30	13	5	12	46	49	−3	44	
7	Svendborg fB	30	11	7	12	49	46	+3	40	
8	Hvidovre IF	30	11	7	12	52	52	0	40	
9	BK Frem	30	12	4	14	46	47	−1	40	
10	BK Fremad Amager	30	11	4	15	42	50	−8	37	
11	Næstved IF	30	11	4	15	35	57	−22	37	
12	Glostrup IF 32	30	9	9	12	40	49	−9	36	
13	RB 1906 (R)	30	10	5	15	35	48	−13	35	Relegation to Danish 2nd Divisions
14	Aalborg Chang (R)	30	10	5	15	42	60	−18	35	Relegation to Danish 2nd Divisions
15	B 1913 (R)	30	6	4	20	33	71	−38	22	Relegation to Danish 2nd Divisions
16	Ølstykke FC (R)	30	5	6	19	37	61	−24	21	Relegation to Danish 2nd Divisions

Rules for classification: 1) points; 2) goal difference; 3) number of goals scored.
(C) Champions; (P) Promoted; (R) Relegated

== Top goalscorers ==
Position	Player	Club	Goals
1	Thomas Ambrosius	Herning Fremad	17
-	Abdul Sule	Herning Fremad	17
3	Thomas Maale	Ølstykke FC	15
-	Morten Poulsen	Viborg FF	15
5	Michael Pedersen	Esbjerg fB	14
-	Kent Hangaard	Aalborg Chang	14

== See also ==
- 1997–98 in Danish football
- 1997–98 Danish Superliga
