= 2000–01 Danish Cup =

Tournament details
- Country: Denmark

Final positions
- Champions: Silkeborg IF
- Runners-up: Akademisk Boldklub

The 2000–01 Danish Cup was the 47th season of the Danish Cup, the highest football competition in Denmark. The final was played on 24 May 2001.

== First round ==
Team 1	Score	Team 2
AB 70	3–6	Gladsaxe-Hero BK
AC Ballerup	8–4	Virum/Sorgenfri BK
B 1950 Bolderslev	1–4	Holbæk B&I
Billund IF	1–4	Lystrup IF
Braband IF	0–2	Frederikshavn fI
Bramming BK	0–3	Holstebro BK
Brønderslev IF	2–3 (a.e.t.)	Støvring IF
Døllefjelde-Musse IF	3–2	BK Skjold
Fjordager IF	0–10	Hjørring AIK Frem
FIF Hillerød	1–0	Skælskør B&I
Grindsted G&IF	0–1	Thisted FC
Græsted IF	4–2	FC Bornholm
Hørsholm-Usserød IK	0–3	Roskilde BK
Haarby BK	3–2	Aalborg Freja
Kastrup BK	1–7	Brønshøj BK
Kerteminde BK	4–1	Brande IF
Korup IF	0–0 (a.e.t.) (6–7 p)	B 1913
Måløv BK	0–1	Albertslund IF
Nykøbing FA	4–3	IF Skjold Birkerød
Nordfalster FB	0–5	Næstved BK
Næsby BK	4–3 (a.e.t.)	Tved BK
Sanderum BK	0–3	Nørresundby BK
Skagen IK	5–1	Skjern GF
Slagelse B&I	1–2	Hellerup IK
Starup UIF	2–3	Ringkøbing IF
Sorø IF Freja	0–1	BK Fremad Valby
Tårnby BK	0–3	Glostrup IF 32
Valby BK	5–2	KFUM Roskilde
Søndermarkens IF	8–4	Skive IK
Viby IF	0–4	Aalborg Chang
VLI Frederiksberg IF	2–4 (a.e.t.)	Helsingør IF
Aabyhøj IF	1–5	Vejen SF

== Second round ==
Team 1	Score	Team 2
Albertslund IF	1–2	Døllefjelde-Musse IF
Brønshøj BK	3–0	Hvidovre IF
FC Fredericia	1–2	FC Aarhus
FIF Hillerød	0–4	AC Ballerup
BK Fremad Valby	2–3	Roskilde BK
Gladsaxe-Hero BK	2–1 (a.e.t.)	Næstved BK
Glostrup FK	2–1	Holbæk B&I
Græsted IF	1–6	Nykøbing FA
Helsingør IF	0–3	Ølstykke FC
Haarby BK	1–1 (a.e.t.) (2–3 p)	Nørresundby BK
Hellerup IK	2–1	B 1913
Kerteminde BK	1–4	Ringkøbing IF
Lystrup IF	1–2	Svendborg fB
Næsby BK	1–2	Holstebro BK
Skagen IK	1–2	Støvring IF
Thisted FC	3–2	Frederikshavn fI
Valby BK	1–2	Fremad Amager
Vejen SF	2–1	Hjørring AIK Frem
Søndermarkens IF	2–6	Dalum IF
Aalborg Chang	0–2	B 1909

== Third round ==
Team 1	Score	Team 2
AC Ballerup	3–2	Glostrup FK
Dalum IF	1–2	Vejle BK
Døllefjelde-Musse IF	4–2 (a.e.t.)	Ølstykke FC
Fremad Amager	2–1	Farum BK
Gladsaxe-Hero BK	2–5 (a.e.t.)	Brønshøj BK
Hellerup IK	1–2 (a.e.t.)	BK Frem
Holstebro BK	4–1	Randers Freja
Nykøbing FA	2–4 (a.e.t.)	B.93
Nørresundby BK	0–0 (a.e.t.) (1–3 p)	AC Horsens
Ringkøbing IF	1–3	FC Aarhus
Roskilde BK	1–4	Køge BK
Støvring IF	1–2	Vejen SF
Svendborg fB	0–3	Esbjerg fB
Thisted FC	0–2	B 1909

== Fourth round ==
Team 1	Score	Team 2
AC Ballerup	2–0	Haderslev FK
B 1909	0–3	Odense BK
B.93	4–1	Lyngby BK
Brønshøj BK	1–2	Vejle BK
Døllefjelde-Musse IF	0–2	Holstebro BK
Esbjerg fB	2–1	Køge BK
FC Aarhus	1–0	AGF
Fremad Amager	1–5	FC Midtjylland
AC Horsens	0–0 (a.e.t.) (4–2 p)	BK Frem
Vejen SF	1–5	F.C. Copenhagen

== Fifth round ==
Team 1	Score	Team 2
FC Midtjylland	3–0	Herfølge BK
Holstebro BK	2–0	Esbjerg fB
AaB	3–3 (a.e.t.) (3–4 p)	Silkeborg IF
Viborg FF	2–0	Odense BK
AC Ballerup	0–5	FC Aarhus
Brøndby IF	2–0	F.C. Copenhagen
Vejle BK	0–2	AB
AC Horsens	3–4	B.93

== Quarter-finals ==
Team 1	Score	Team 2
B.93	2–2 (a.e.t.) (3–4 p)	FC Midtjylland
FC Aarhus	0–1	Silkeborg IF
Holstebro BK	1–2 (a.e.t.)	AB
Viborg FF	2–0	Brøndby IF

== Semi-finals ==
Team 1	Agg.	Team 2	1st leg	2nd leg
AB	1–0	Viborg FF	1–0	0–0
FC Midtjylland	1–4	Silkeborg IF	1–1	0–3

== Final ==
24 May 2001
15:00 CEST

AB	1–4	Silkeborg IF
Akida 14'	Report	B. Pedersen 50'; Poulsen 63'; H. Pedersen 74', 89'

Parken Stadium, Copenhagen
Attendance: 14,743
Referee: Nicolai Vollquartz
