= Jochumsen =

Jochumsen is a surname, likely of Danish origin. Notable people with the surname include:

- Anders Jochumsen (born 1981), Danish football manager and former professional footballer
- Søren Jochumsen (born 1976), Danish former professional footballer
