= FC Fredericia =

Danish football club

- Full name: Fodbold Club Fredericia af 1991
- Founded: 1 January 1991; 35 years ago
- Ground: Monjasa Park
- Capacity: 6,000
- Owner: Fodbold Club Fredericia 1991 ApS
- Chairman: Morten Rahbek
- Manager: Michael Hansen
- League: Danish 1st Division
- 2025–26: Superliga, 11th of 12 (relegated)
- Website: fcfredericia.dk
| Home colours | Away colours | Third colours |

Fodbold Club Fredericia af 1991 (Danish pronunciation: [fʁeðɐˈʁetɕæ, fʁæðɐˈʁætɕæ]), simply known as FC Fredericia, is a professional association football club based in the town of Fredericia, Denmark, that competes in the Danish 1st Division, the 2nd tier of the Danish football league system. Founded in 1991 as a merger between Fredericia fF and Fredericia KFUM, it is affiliated to DBU Jutland. The team plays its home matches at Fredericia Stadium, named Monjasa Park for sponsorship reasons, where it has been based since 2006.

In 2002, Fredericia fF pulled out of the merger, which means that FC Fredericia today continues to be the professional branch of Fredericia KFUM. Despite this, FC Fredericia has enjoyed considerable success since its foundation as they have risen through the pyramid; from their inception when they competed in the Denmark Series, the fourth tier of Danish football.

== History ==
=== Early history ===
FC Fredericia was officially established on 3 January 1991 at two extraordinary general meetings in Fredericia fF and Fredericia KFUM, respectively. Members overwhelmingly supported an agreement of cooperation between the two clubs, which their respective boards had previously agreed to. With effect from 1 January 1991, FC Fredericia became reality. The merger was in fact a superstructure between Fredericia's two highest ranked teams, competing in the Denmark Series, the fourth tier of the Danish football league system, and Series 1, a regional division which is the sixth level in the pyramid. The formation of a professional club by uniting the best teams of the town, two former rivals even, was supported unequivocally by sponsors and Fredericia Municipality.

The club reached promotion to the Danish 2nd Division, the third tier, in its inaugural season. In the 1994–95 season, Fredericia qualified for promotion play-offs after ending third in the promotion group of the 2nd Division West. After facing AC Horsens over two legs, which ended 3–3 and 1–1, respectively, Fredericia reached promotion to the Danish 1st Division, the third tier, on away goals.

In 2002, Fredericia fF pulled out of the project, so as of 2003 FC Fredericia continued to be the professional branch of Fredericia KFUM. In the autumn of 2005, they won the first edition of the former Fionia Bank Cup, beating out Kolding FC and Vejle Boldklub on goal difference. The following year, Fredericia moved into their new home ground, Fredericia Stadium.

=== New ambitions ===
The club achieved its highest ever league position, third in the second tier, under Peter Sørensen in 2009–10, only missing out on promotion to the Danish Superliga by three points. In the following seasons, after Sørensen was appointed manager for AGF, Fredericia again became a midtable side. A high point, however, occurred in the 2012–13 season where the club found themselves in the race for promotion after a highly successful autumn. However, a series of poor results in the spring saw coach Thomas Thomasberg sacked in April 2013, and the club finished the season in fifth place; out of reach of promotion.

During the 2017–18 season, FC Fredericia went on a historic run in the Danish Cup, knocking out AGF (1–0), HB Køge (2–0) and AaB (3–1) en route to the semi-finals, in which the club faced Silkeborg IF in a home game on 25 April 2018. In front of 3,905 spectators at Monjasa Park, the club lost 0–1 after an own goal by Oliver Fredsted.

In May 2020, Fredericia Municipality announced at a press conference plans for upgrading Monjasa Park. A new stand with a seating capacity of 1,400 and terracing able to hold 500 away-fans were planned for construction before the end of the year. The plans would see stadium infrastructure improve and prepare FC Fredericia for a possible future promotion to the Danish Superliga, which mayor Jacob Bjerregaard stated could happen within the "next 2–3 years". The announcement came at a point where the Danish Football Union had suspended the Danish leagues, including the Danish 1st Division due to the coronavirus pandemic. At that point, the team, coached by Jonas Dal were third in the league, nine points from archrivals Vejle Boldklub in the promotion spot. The new stand was completed in April 2021, bringing the total capacity to 6,000.

On 9 May 2025, the club earned promotion to the Danish Superliga for the first time in their existence, ending a 24 year spell in the 1st Division.

== Players ==
=== Current squad ===
As of 3 September 2026

Note: Flags indicate national team as defined under FIFA eligibility rules; some limited exceptions apply. Players may hold more than one non-FIFA nationality.

| No. | Pos. | Nation | Player |
|---|---|---|---|
| 3 | DF | DEN | Adam Nygaard |
| 4 | DF | DEN | Jeppe Kudsk |
| 5 | DF | DEN | Frederik Rieper (captain) |
| 6 | MF | DEN | Felix Winther |
| 7 | FW | DEN | Alexander Lyng |
| 8 | FW | NOR | Bork Bang-Kittilsen |
| 9 | FW | DEN | Patrick Egelund |
| 10 | MF | DEN | Emilio Simonsen |
| 11 | FW | DEN | Elias Hansborg-Sørensen |
| 12 | DF | DEN | Svenn Crone |
| 13 | MF | DEN | William Madsen |
| 14 | DF | DEN | Anders Dahl |
| 15 | DF | DEN | Malthe Ladefoged |

| No. | Pos. | Nation | Player |
|---|---|---|---|
| 16 | DF | DEN | Lauritz Dauerhøj |
| 17 | FW | GRL | Nemo Thomsen |
| 18 | MF | DEN | Andreas Pyndt |
| 19 | FW | DEN | Asbjørn Bøndergaard |
| 20 | MF | DEN | Daniel Haarbo |
| 21 | DF | DEN | Oliver Vest |
| 22 | MF | DEN | Frederik Bunten (on loan from Midtjylland) |
| 23 | MF | DEN | Jonatan Lindekilde (on loan from Midtjylland) |
| 24 | MF | DEN | Casper Jørgensen |
| 31 | GK | DEN | Andreas Gülstorff |
| 44 | GK | DEN | Christian Risom |
| 90 | GK | DEN | Valdemar Birksø |
| 99 | GK | DEN | Victor Øberg |

=== Youth players in use 2026-27 ===
Note: Flags indicate national team as defined under FIFA eligibility rules; some limited exceptions apply. Players may hold more than one non-FIFA nationality.

| No. | Pos. | Nation | Player |

=== Out on loan ===
Note: Flags indicate national team as defined under FIFA eligibility rules; some limited exceptions apply. Players may hold more than one non-FIFA nationality.

| No. | Pos. | Nation | Player |

=== Notable former players ===
- (Denmark) Kim Nørholt

== Backroom staff ==
=== Club officials ===
| Position | Staff |
|---|---|
| Chairman | Morten Rahbek |
| Director | Stig Pedersen |
| Vice-chairman | Niels Kruse |
| Board of Directors | Hans Henrik Davidsen; Morten Kollerup Nielsen; Klaus Andersen; Mads Thejl Hansen; Stig Andresen; David Gulløv |

Source: FC Fredericia | Bestyrelsen

| Position | Name |
|---|---|
| Head coach | (Denmark) Michael Hansen |
| Assistant manager | (Denmark) Christian Ege |
| Goalkeeping coach | (Denmark) Carsten Christensen |

Source: FC Fredericia | Holdet

== Honours ==
=== Domestic ===
==== National leagues ====
- Second Highest Danish League^{2}
  - Best league performance:
    Runners-up (1): 2024–25
- Third Highest Danish League^{3}
  - Best league performance:
    Runners-up (2): 1998–99, 2000–01
- Fourth Highest Danish League^{4}
  - Group 3 Winners (1): 1991

==== Cups ====
- DBU Pokalen
  - Best cup performance:
    Semi-finals (2): 2017–18, 2023–24

- ^{2}: Level 2: 1. Division (1991–present)
- ^{3}: Level 3: 2. Division (1991–present)
- ^{4}: Level 4: Danmarksserien for herrer (1966–present)

== Recent results ==
| Season | Position | Played | W | D | L | GF | GA | Points | Cup result | Notes |
|---|---|---|---|---|---|---|---|---|---|---|
| 2025-26 (Superliga) | 11/12 | 32 | 9 | 7 | 16 | 45 | 68 | 34 | Round of 16 | Relegated |
| 2024-25 (1st Division/NordicBet Liga) | 2/12 | 32 | 20 | 4 | 8 | 65 | 30 | 64 | Third round | Promoted |
| 2023-24 (1st Division/NordicBet Liga) | 4/12 | 32 | 13 | 8 | 11 | 46 | 42 | 47 | Semi finals | |
| 2022-23 (1st Division/NordicBet Liga) | 11/12 | 32 | 13 | 6 | 13 | 56 | 48 | 45 | Second round | avoided relegation in the playoffs |
| 2021-22 (1st Division/NordicBet Liga) | 5/12 | 32 | 15 | 5 | 12 | 55 | 53 | 50 | Fourth round | |
| 2020-21 (1st Division/NordicBet Liga) | 5/12 | 32 | 13 | 5 | 14 | 42 | 44 | 44 | First round | |
| 2019–20 (1st Division/NordicBet Liga) | 3/12 | 33 | 15 | 7 | 11 | 60 | 51 | 52 | Fourth round | |
| 2018-19 (1st Division/NordicBet Liga) | 6/12 | 33 | 14 | 5 | 14 | 51 | 47 | 47 | Third round | |
| 2017–18 (1st Division/NordicBet Liga) | 6/12 | 33 | 11 | 9 | 13 | 48 | 47 | 42 | Semi finals | |
| 2016–17 (1st Division/NordicBet Liga) | 8/12 | 33 | 11 | 10 | 12 | 36 | 43 | 43 | Third round | |
| 2015–16 (1st Division/bet25 Liga) | 6/12 | 33 | 12 | 11 | 10 | 45 | 45 | 47 | Fourth round | |
| 2014–15 (1st Division) | 10/12 | 33 | 6 | 16 | 11 | 28 | 40 | 34 | Second round | |
| 2013–14 (1st Division/NordicBet Liga) | 8/12 | 33 | 12 | 7 | 14 | 47 | 45 | 43 | Fourth round | |
| 2012–13 (1st Division/Betsafe Liga) | 5/12 | 33 | 11 | 11 | 11 | 53 | 48 | 44 | Third round | |
| 2011–12 (1st Division) | 7/14 | 26 | 9 | 8 | 9 | 33 | 30 | 35 | Quarter finals | |
| 2010–11 (1st Division) | 6/16 | 30 | 13 | 6 | 11 | 53 | 41 | 45 | Fourth round | |
| 2009–10 (1st Division) | 3/16 | 30 | 18 | 5 | 7 | 56 | 22 | 59 | Quarter finals | |
| 2008–09 (1st Division/Viasat Divisionen) | 7/16 | 30 | 14 | 8 | 8 | 58 | 43 | 47 | Fourth round | |
| 2007–08 (1st Division) /Viasat Divisionen) | 5/16 | 30 | 12 | 8 | 10 | 49 | 36 | 44 | Third round | |
| 2006–07 (1st Division) | 4/16 | 30 | 16 | 5 | 9 | 50 | 37 | 53 | Fourth round | |
| 2005–06 (1st Division) | 7/16 | 30 | 12 | 5 | 13 | 48 | 40 | 41 | Third round | |
| 2004–05 (1st Division) | 9/16 | 30 | 10 | 8 | 12 | 48 | 50 | 38 | Fourth round | |
| 2003–04 (1st Division) | 10/16 | 30 | 9 | 9 | 12 | 42 | 47 | 36 | Third round | |
| 2002–03 (1st Division) | 3/16 | 30 | 14 | 9 | 7 | 50 | 29 | 51 | Third round | |
| 2001–02 (1st Division) | 11/16 | 30 | 7 | 9 | 14 | 45 | 46 | 30 | Second round | |
| 2000–01 (2nd Division) | 2/16 | 30 | 20 | 3 | 7 | 73 | 39 | 63 | Second round | Promoted |
| 1999–2000 (1st Division) | 15/16 | 30 | 4 | 5 | 21 | 24 | 61 | 17 | First round | Relegated |

== See also ==
- Fionia Bank Cup
