= Fionia =

Fionia may refer to:

- Fionia Bank Cup, a Danish football tournament
- Funen, the third-largest island of Denmark
- MS Fionia, a Danish ocean-going diesel motor ship, sister ship of MS Selandia
- Odense Stadium, a football stadium once called Fionia Park
