= Sebastian Hausner =

Danish footballer (born 2000)

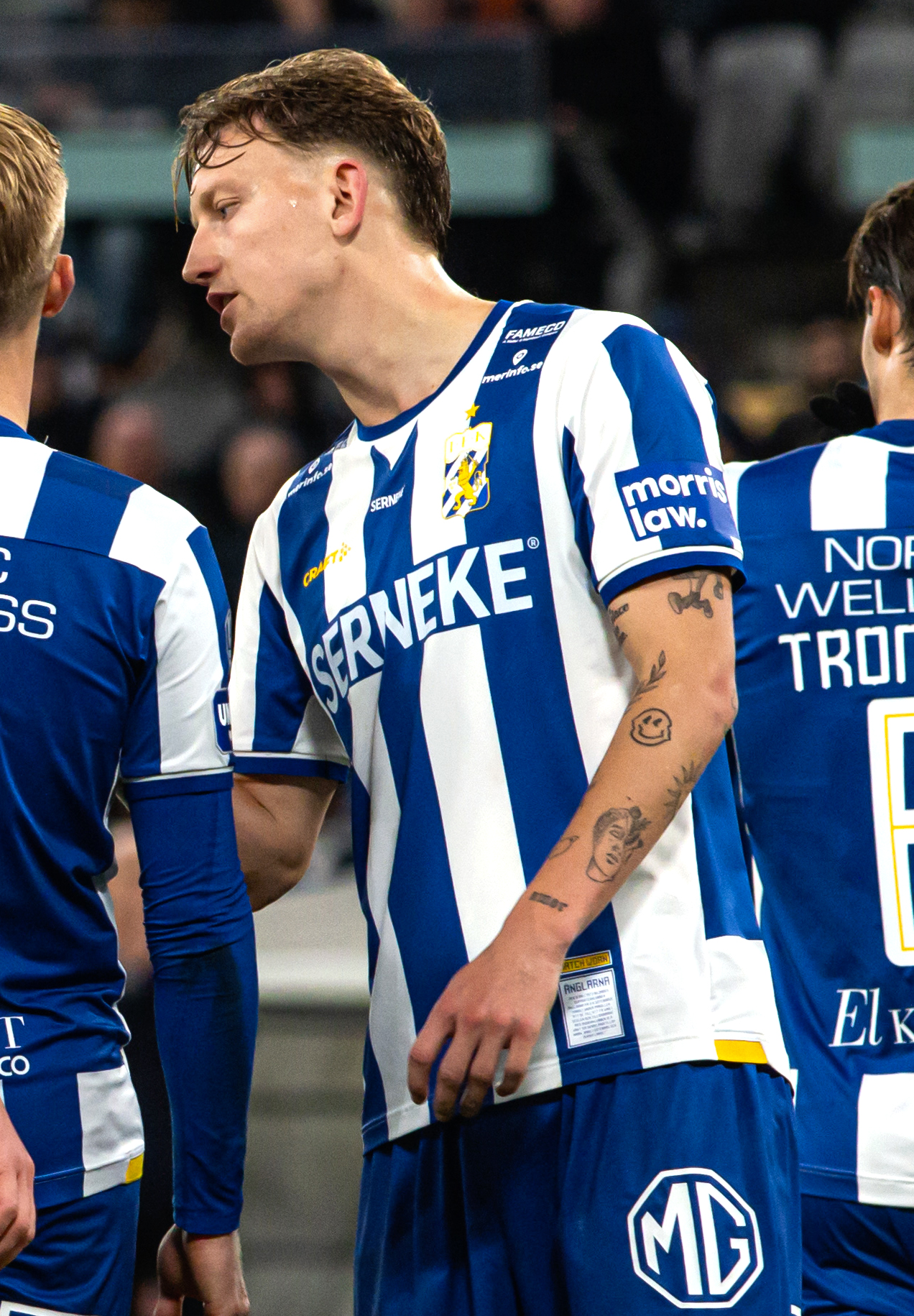

Personal information
- Full name: Sebastian Lund Hausner
- Date of birth: 11 April 2000 (age 26)
- Place of birth: Tyrsted, Denmark
- Height: 1.88 m (6 ft 2 in)
- Position: Centre-back

Team information
- Current team: AIK (on loan from AC Horsens)
- Number: 20

Youth career
- 2006–2012: FC Horsens
- 2012–2013: Horsens fS
- 2013–2014: AC Horsens
- 2014–2019: AGF

Senior career*
Years	Team	Apps	(Gls)
2019–2023	AGF	80	(0)
2023–2024	IFK Göteborg	37	(1)
2024–	AC Horsens	47	(2)
2026–	→ AIK (loan)	2	(0)

International career
2016	Denmark U16	6	(0)
2016–2017	Denmark U17	11	(0)
2017–2018	Denmark U18	6	(0)
2018–2019	Denmark U19	4	(1)
2020–2021	Denmark U21	7	(0)
- * Club domestic league appearances and goals as of 16:32, 23 September 2026 (UTC)

Sebastian Lund Hausner (born 11 April 2000) is a Danish professional footballer who plays as a centre-back for Allsvenskan club AIK, on loan from Danish Superliga club AC Horsens.

A native of Tyrsted, a suburb of Horsens, Hausner progressed through various youth teams in the area, most notable AC Horsens, before moving to the AGF youth academy in 2014 at age 14. He broke through to the first team in 2017, and became established as a starter in defense in the 2019–20 season under head coach David Nielsen. In 2023, he moved to Allsvenskan club IFK Göteborg.

He has played for several national youth teams, and was called up for his country at under-21 level in August 2020.

== Club career ==
=== Early career ===
Growing up in Tyrsted, a southern suburb of Horsens, Hausner started playing football as a six-year-old for local club FC Horsens. At under-13 level he moved to Horsens fS, which became the youth academy of AC Horsens – the major professional club in the area – a year after his arrival. As a defensive midfielder, he was part of the team winning the Jutland Championship for U13-teams in his first year at the club. At under-14 level, Hausner grew into team captain, and was lauded for his leadership and aggressive playing style.

=== AGF ===
In November 2014, 14-year old Hausner joined AGF from AC Horsens. One and a half year later, he signed his first youth contract with the club.

In March 2017, Hausner was called up to the first team for the Danish Cup quarterfinal against his former club AC Horsens. AGF was under pressure due to the many injuries in the defence but Hausner did not make his debut in that game. Two months later, he was promoted into the first team squad permanently at the age of 17. In the following season, Hausner sat on the bench for four games in the Danish Superliga.

His official debut came on 26 September 2018 in the Danish Cup against Aarhus Fremad where he played the last 15 minutes. Hausner also got his Danish Superliga debut in March 2019 against Vendsyssel FF.

In July 2019, he signed a four-year contract extension to his contract for four years. That season, he experienced his breakthrough for the club under head coach David Nielsen, making 18 appearances – 17 as a starter – in the Superliga, as AGF finished in third place and secured medals for the first time since 1997.

At the same time as teammate Albert Grønbæk, Hausner signed another contract extension in mid-December 2020, valid until the end of 2025. He remained a starter in defense for most of the 2020–21 season, as AGF once again qualified for the championship round and finished in the top spots in the league table. Due to his performances, rumours of a summer move materialised. On 20 May 2021, Hausner made a mistake that led to Mikael Uhre from Brøndby IF scoring the 2–1 winner, bringing the club one game away from their first league title in 16 years. Afterwards, he received online threats and accusations of match fixing. Director of communication in AGF Søren Højlund Carlsen called the accusations "violent", and said that "they were derogatory terms from the ugliest side of the dictionary, which must stop", and further called for a "need to talk to each other properly".

=== IFK Göteborg ===
On 30 January 2023, Hausner signed with Allsvenskan club IFK Göteborg on a deal until 2026. He made his debut for the club on 5 March, starting in a 4–0 home defeat against IFK Norrköping in Svenska Cupen. He was criticised after the game by pundit Astrit Ajdarević, after failing to clear the ball which led to Norrköping's opening goal. His league debut following on 2 April, the first matchday of the season, again featuring in the starting lineup as Göteborg lost 1–0 at home to IFK Värnamo. On 27 August, he scored his first goal for Blåvitt, as well as his first professional goal, helping them to a 4–2 home victory against BK Häcken. Hausner ended the season with one goal in 25 total appearances for the club.

=== AC Horsens ===
On 17 July 2024, Hausner signed with Danish 1st Division club AC Horsens on a four-year contract.

On 31 August 2026, Hausner joined Allsvenskan club AIK on a loan until the end of the 2026 season.

== International career ==
Hausner played six times for the under-16 national team in 2016 and in 11 games for the under-17 from 2016 to 2017. From 2017 to 2018 Hausner played in 6 games for the under-18 and from 2018 to 2019 in 4 games for the Denmark under-19 team.

On 24 August 2020, Hausner was called up by Denmark under-21 national coach Albert Capellas for the squad for the 2021 UEFA European Under-21 Championship qualifiers against Ukraine and Northern Ireland.

== Career statistics ==
As of match played 20 September 2026

Appearances and goals by club, season and competition
Club	Season	League			National cup (Note: Includes Danish Cup, Svenska Cupen)		Europe		Other		Total	
Club	Season	Division	Apps	Goals	Apps	Goals	Apps	Goals	Apps	Goals	Apps	Goals
AGF	2018–19	Danish Superliga	6	0	1	0	—		—		7	0
AGF	2019–20	Danish Superliga	18	0	4	0	—		1 (Note: Appearances in the Danish Superliga Europa League playoff)	0	23	0
AGF	2020–21	Danish Superliga	27	0	4	0	1 (Note: Appearances in UEFA Europa League)	0	1	0	33	0
AGF	2021–22	Danish Superliga	24	0	1	0	1 (Note: Appearances in UEFA Europa Conference League)	0	—		26	0
AGF	2022–23	Danish Superliga	5	0	2	0	—		—		7	0
AGF	Total		80	0	12	0	2	0	2	0	96	0
IFK Göteborg	2023	Allsvenskan	24	1	1	0	—		—		25	1
IFK Göteborg	2024	Allsvenskan	13	0	3	0	—		—		16	0
IFK Göteborg	Total		37	1	4	0	—		—		41	1
AC Horsens	2024–25	Danish 1st Division	25	1	1	0	—		—		26	1
AC Horsens	2025–26	Danish 1st Division	21	1	1	0	—		—		22	1
AC Horsens	2026–27	Danish Superliga	1	0	0	0	—		—		1	0
AC Horsens	Total		47	2	2	0	—		—		49	2
AIK (loan)	2026	Allsvenskan	2	0	0	0	—		—		2	0
Career total			166	3	18	0	2	0	2	0	188	3
