= 2000–01 Danish 1st Division =

56th season of Danish 1st Division

Danish 1st Division
- Season: 2000–01

The 2000–01 Danish 1st Division season was the 56th season of the Danish 1st Division league championship and the 15th consecutive as a second tier competition governed by the Danish Football Association.

The division-champion and runner-up promoted to the 2001–02 Danish Superliga. The teams in the 14th, 15th and 16th relegated to the 2001–02 Danish 2nd Division.

== Table ==
Pos	Team	Pld	W	D	L	GF	GA	GD	Pts	Promotion or relegation
1	Esbjerg fB (C, P)	30	19	8	3	79	29	+50	65	Promotion to Danish Superliga
2	Vejle BK (P)	30	17	8	5	73	37	+36	59	Promotion to Danish Superliga
3	Køge BK	30	16	8	6	60	36	+24	56	
4	BK Frem	30	16	7	7	64	34	+30	55	
5	Farum BK	30	15	5	10	62	48	+14	50	
6	B 93	30	13	5	12	52	46	+6	44	
7	AC Horsens	30	11	10	9	41	38	+3	43	
8	B 1913	30	11	9	10	42	46	−4	42	
9	Brønshøj BK	30	13	2	15	54	57	−3	41	
10	Hvidovre IF	30	10	8	12	55	55	0	38	
11	Randers Freja	30	9	6	15	42	57	−15	33	
12	FC Aarhus	30	8	9	13	42	65	−23	33	
13	Skive IK	30	8	8	14	52	73	−21	32	
14	BK Fremad Amager (R)	30	8	7	15	43	64	−21	31	Relegation to Danish 2nd Divisions
15	Ølstykke FC (R)	30	8	6	16	38	76	−38	30	Relegation to Danish 2nd Divisions
16	Birkerød IF Skjold (R)	30	3	4	23	42	80	−38	13	Relegation to Danish 2nd Divisions

Rules for classification: 1) points; 2) goal difference; 3) number of goals scored.
(C) Champions; (P) Promoted; (R) Relegated

== Top goalscorers ==
Position	Player	Club	Goals
1	Jeppe Tengbjerg	Farum BK	25
2	Tommy Olsen	Køge BK	20
3	Kasper Dalgas	Vejle BK	19
4	Mads Junker	BK Fremad Amager	16
-	Martin Jeppesen	BK Frem	16
6	Nicolas Drost	B 1913	15
-	Henrik Nielsen	Esbjerg fB	15
8	Kenneth Fuhr Pedersen	Ølstykke FC	14
-	Michael Hansen	Esbjerg fB	14
10	Kim Christensen	BK Frem	13
-	Johnny Tveen	Skive IK	13

== See also ==
- 2000–01 in Danish football
- 2000–01 Danish Superliga
