= Aleksandrs Roslovs =

Latvian association football player (born 1983)

Personal information
- Date of birth: 11 March 1983 (age 43)
- Place of birth: Liepāja, Latvia
- Position: Defender

Senior career*
Years	Team	Apps	(Gls)
- FK Liepājas Metalurgs
- FK Auda
- FC Bornholm
- Randers Sportsklub Freja
- Randers FC
2003-2004	FC Hämeenlinna	14	(0)
- Fremad Amager
- Ølstykke FC
- Fremad Amager
- Hellerup IK
- Ølstykke FC
- Køge Boldklub
- Ølstykke FC
- Allerød FK
- IF Skjold Birkerød
- * Club domestic league appearances and goals

Aleksandrs Roslovs (born 11 March 1983) is a Latvian retired footballer.

== Career ==
After leaving Latvian club FK Auda, Roslovs joined Bornholm in the Danish amateur leagues, becoming the first Latvian to play in Denmark in the process.

For 2003, he signed for Hämeenlinna in the Finnish top flight, where he made 14 league appearances over two seasons.
