= 1998–99 Danish 1st Division =

54th season of Danish 1st Division

Danish 1st Division
- Season: 1998–99

The 1998–99 Danish 1st Division season was the 54th season of the Danish 1st Division league championship and the 13th consecutive as a second tier competition governed by the Danish Football Association.

The division-champion and runner-up promoted to the 1999–2000 Danish Superliga. The teams in the 13th to 16th spots were relegated to the 1999–2000 Danish 2nd Division.

== Table ==
Pos	Team	Pld	W	D	L	GF	GA	GD	Pts	Promotion or relegation
1	Odense BK (C, P)	30	24	2	4	81	24	+57	74	Promotion to Danish Superliga
2	Esbjerg fB (P)	30	19	7	4	69	33	+36	64	Promotion to Danish Superliga
3	Ikast fS	30	19	5	6	73	43	+30	62	
4	Herning Fremad	30	15	4	11	61	41	+20	49	
5	Haderslev FK	30	14	5	11	76	58	+18	47	
6	AC Horsens	30	13	5	12	47	44	+3	44	
7	BK Fremad Amager	30	12	6	12	48	48	0	42	
8	Køge BK	30	12	6	12	49	56	−7	42	
9	BK Frem	30	12	5	13	45	63	−18	41	
10	Svendborg fB	30	10	8	12	39	43	−4	38	
11	Hvidovre IF	30	10	7	13	36	53	−17	37	
12	B 1909	30	8	10	12	52	58	−6	34	
13	Glostrup IF 32 (R)	30	8	9	13	48	60	−12	33	Relegation to Danish 2nd Divisions
14	Holstebro BK (R)	30	7	4	19	42	66	−24	25	Relegation to Danish 2nd Divisions
15	Næstved IF (R)	30	7	4	19	44	82	−38	25	Relegation to Danish 2nd Divisions
16	Brønshøj BK (R)	30	5	3	22	41	79	−38	18	Relegation to Danish 2nd Divisions

Rules for classification: 1) points; 2) goal difference; 3) number of goals scored.
(C) Champions; (P) Promoted; (R) Relegated

== Top goalscorers ==
Position	Player	Club	Goals
1	Christian Lundberg	Ikast fS	21
-	Mwape Miti	Odense BK	21
3	Thomas Ambrosius	Herning Fremad	18
4	Peter Rasmussen	B 1909	17
-	Henrik Asmussen	Haderslev FK	17
-	Claus Bech Jørgensen	AC Horsens	17
7	Iddi Alkhag	Esbjerg fB	15
-	Per Andersen	Holstebro BK	15
9	Claus Andersen	Køge BK	14
10	Anders Clausen	Næstved IF	13

== See also ==
- 1998–99 in Danish football
- 1998–99 Danish Superliga
