= 2003–04 Danish 1st Division =

59th season of Danish 1st Division

Danish 1st Division
- Season: 2003–04

The 2003–04 Danish 1st Division season was the 59th season of the Danish 1st Division league championship and the 18th consecutive as a second tier competition governed by the Danish Football Association.

The division-champion and runner-up promoted to the 2004–05 Danish Superliga. The teams in the 14th, 15th and 16th relegated to the 2004–05 Danish 2nd Division.

== Table ==
Pos	Team	Pld	W	D	L	GF	GA	GD	Pts	Promotion or relegation
1	Silkeborg IF (C, P)	30	21	4	5	70	25	+45	67	Promotion to Danish Superliga
2	Randers FC (P)	30	21	3	6	85	43	+42	66	Promotion to Danish Superliga
3	AC Horsens	30	19	5	6	50	26	+24	62	
4	Køge BK	30	18	7	5	62	39	+23	61	
5	BK Skjold	30	16	4	10	62	50	+12	52	
6	SønderjyskE	30	15	6	9	72	51	+21	51	
7	Ølstykke FC	30	13	4	13	59	53	+6	43	
8	NFA	30	13	4	13	46	51	−5	43	
9	FC Nordjylland	30	10	9	11	34	42	−8	39	
10	FC Fredericia	30	9	9	12	42	47	−5	36	
11	BK Fremad Amager	30	9	7	14	42	53	−11	34	
12	Vejle BK	30	8	6	16	44	59	−15	30	
13	B 93	30	7	7	16	44	50	−6	28	
14	Brønshøj BK (R)	30	6	6	18	43	77	−34	24	Relegation to Danish 2nd Divisions
15	FC Aarhus (R)	30	5	5	20	29	72	−43	20	Relegation to Danish 2nd Divisions
16	B 1913 (R)	30	3	8	19	27	73	−46	17	Relegation to Danish 2nd Divisions

Rules for classification: 1) points; 2) goal difference; 3) number of goals scored.
(C) Champions; (P) Promoted; (R) Relegated

== See also ==
- 2003–04 in Danish football
- 2003–04 Danish Superliga
