= Fionia Bank Cup =

Danish football tournament

The Fionia Bank Cup was a Danish football tournament between the three Triangle Region clubs, FC Fredericia, Kolding FC and Vejle Boldklub. The tournament was sponsored by the Danish Fionia Bank, and ran for one season.

== Rules ==
The tournament was played twice a season, once for the autumn, and once for the spring-season. The results from the Danish 1st Division between the teams were used.

=== Prize money ===
The champion received 40,000 Danish kroner, runners-up 20,000 DKK and third place got 15,000 DKK.

== Results ==
=== Spring 2006 ===
Team	Pld	W	D	L	GF	GA	GD	Pts
1. Kolding FC	2	1	1	0	3	2	+1	4
1. Vejle Boldklub	2	1	1	0	3	2	+1	4
3. FC Fredericia	2	0	0	2	0	2	−2	0

==== Matches ====
March 26, 2006
FC Fredericia	0-1	Vejle Boldklub	13:00	Fredericia Stadion
April 7, 2006
FC Fredericia	0-1	Kolding FC	17:30	Fredericia Stadion
June 18, 2006
Kolding FC	2-2	Vejle Boldklub	15:00	Kolding Stadion

=== Autumn 2005 ===
Team	Pld	W	D	L	GF	GA	GD	Pts
1. FC Fredericia	2	1	0	1	5	3	+2	3
2. Kolding FC	2	1	0	1	3	4	−1	3
3. Vejle Boldklub	2	1	0	1	2	3	−1	3

==== Matches ====
August 7, 2005
Kolding FC	3-2	FC Fredericia	13:00	Kolding Stadion
September 23, 2005
Vejle Boldklub	2-0	Kolding FC	15:00	Vejle Stadion
November 6, 2005
Vejle Boldklub	0-3	FC Fredericia	15:00	Vejle Stadion
