= Kaspar Dalgas =

Danish footballer (born 1976)

Personal information
- Full name: Kaspar Buhl Dalgas
- Date of birth: 11 May 1976 (age 50)
- Place of birth: Vejle, Denmark
- Height: 1.78 m (5 ft 10 in)
- Position: Striker

Youth career
- Vejle FC
- Vejle Boldklub

Senior career*
Years	Team	Apps	(Gls)
1994–2001	Vejle Boldklub	129	(44)
2001–2002	OB	39	(24)
2002–2006	Brøndby	45	(8)
Total		213	(76)

International career
1997	Denmark U21	1	(0)
- * Club domestic league appearances and goals

Kaspar Buhl Dalgas (born 11 May 1976) is a Danish former professional footballer who was the joint top scorer of the 2001–02 Danish Superliga season with 22 goals in 31 games. He represented the Denmark U21 team once, in 1997.

== Career ==
Dalgas spent his youth years at Vejle Boldklub, alongside Thomas Gravesen, and made his senior debut for the club in April 1995. He was called up for the Denmark under-21 national team in September 1997, and played a single game for the team. Dalgas played several seasons as an attacking midfielder for Vejle, but following the club's difficulties in remaining in the top-flight Danish Superliga division, he moved to Superliga club Odense Boldklub (OB) in 2001.

At OB he experienced a short, but extremely successful, stint, playing as a forward. His year at the club resulted in 22 league goals and the joint league top scorer title with Peter Madsen from Brøndby IF. After the season, he was bought by new Brøndby IF coach Michael Laudrup. He would play all league matches in his first year at Brøndby, and Dalgas was named man of the match when he scored in the 2003 Danish Cup 3–0 final win against FC Midtjylland.

Injuries ruined his next season, as he was struggling to recover from a complicated knee injury. He would not play a single match for Brøndby from April 2004 to November 2005. He came on as a substitute in the November 2005 Royal League match against Kalmar FF, which was to be his last professional game. Dalgas ended his career in March 2006, as a knee scan had shown no healing of his knee injury.

== Honours ==
OB

- Danish Cup: 2001–02

Brøndby

- Danish Cup: 2002–03
