= Tyrsted Parish =

Parish in Horsens Municipality, Denmark

Tyrsted Parish Tyrsted Sogn
- Parish
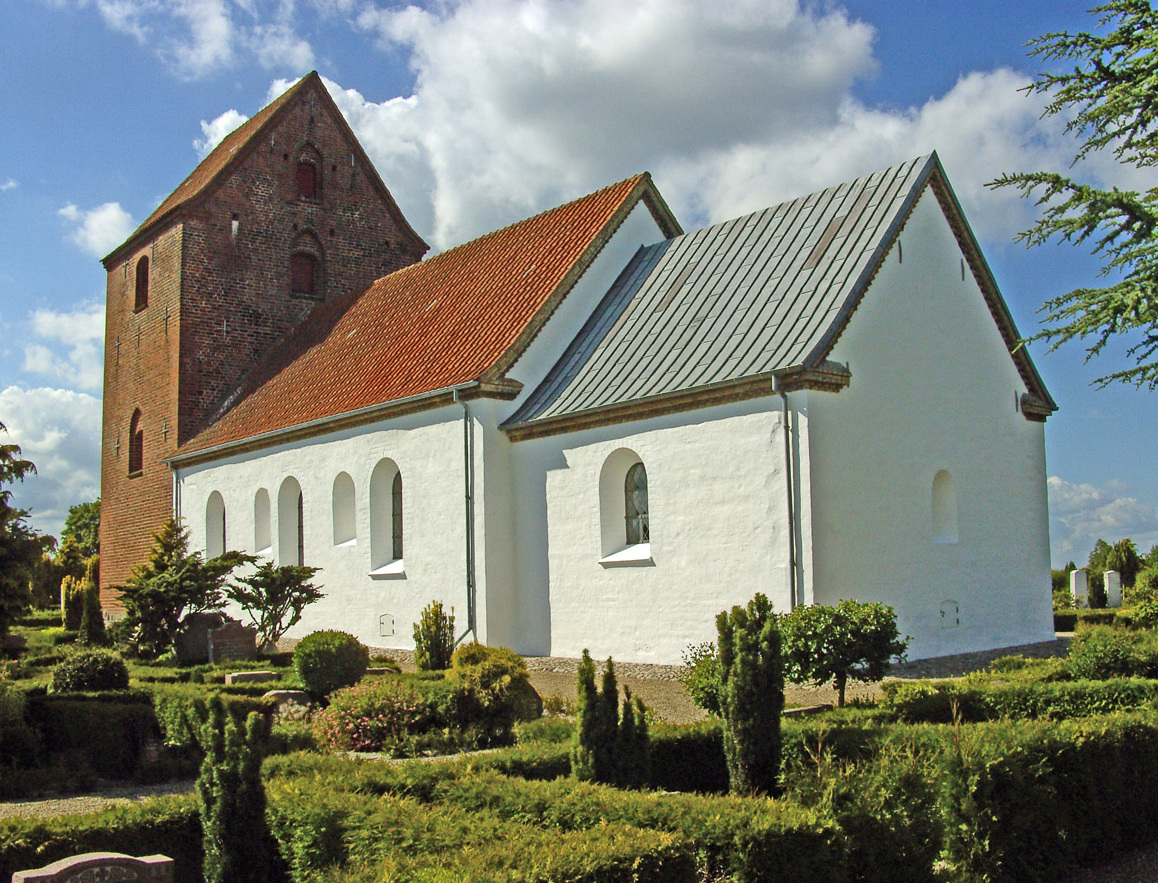
- Tyrsted Church
- Interactive map of Tyrsted Parish
- Coordinates: 55°50′N 9°52′E
- Country: Denmark
- Region: Central Denmark
- Municipality: Horsens Municipality
- Diocese: Aarhus

Population (2025)
  - Total: 12,521
- Parish number: 7967

Tyrsted Parish (Danish: Tyrsted Sogn) is a parish in the Diocese of Aarhus in Horsens Municipality, Denmark. It is located 2 miles southeast of Horsens, Jutland, Denmark.

== Notable people ==
- Inger Kathrine Jacobsen (1867 in Tyrsted – 1939) a New Zealand midwife
- Sebastian Hausner (born 2000) a Danish footballer
