= Inger Kathrine Jacobsen =

New Zealand midwife (1867–1939)

Inger Kathrine Jacobsen (5 September 1867 – 22 October 1939) was a New Zealand midwife. She was born in Tyrsted, Denmark on 5 September 1867.
