= Søren Jochumsen =

Danish footballer (born 1976)

Personal information
- Date of birth: 1 August 1976 (age 50)
- Place of birth: Horsens, Denmark
- Height: 1.80 m (5 ft 11 in)
- Position: Goalkeeper

Youth career
- 1982–1990: Torsted IF
- 1990–1994: FC Horsens

Senior career*
Years	Team	Apps	(Gls)
1994–2012	AC Horsens	521	(16)
2019	AC Horsens	0	(0)
- * Club domestic league appearances and goals

Søren Jochumsen (born 1 August 1976) is a Danish retired professional football (soccer) player, who played as a goalkeeper. Despite his lack of height, he is known as one of the most reliable goalkeepers of the league.

He played for Torsted IF until 1990, where he moved to FC Horsens. In 1994, FC Horsens became a part of the superstructure AC Horsens, and Jochumsen moved to the new team, where he has played since.

== Honours ==
- Danish 1st Division:
  - Runner-up: 2004-05
- Danish 2nd Division:
  - Runner-up: 1996-97
