= Dennis Siim =

Danish footballer (born 1983)

Personal information
- Full name: Dennis Michael Siim
- Date of birth: 10 April 1976 (age 50)
- Place of birth: Denmark
- Position: Midfielder

Senior career*
Years	Team	Apps	(Gls)
1994–2000	AGF	146	(3)
2001–2003	OB	83	(4)
2004	→ Sønderjyske (loan)		
2005	FH	6	(0)
2005–2006	Randers		
2006–2009	FH	47	(3)
- * Club domestic league appearances and goals

Dennis Michael Siim (born 10 April 1976) is a Danish former footballer who played as a midfielder for AGF.

== Early life ==
Siim was born in 1976 in Denmark. He joined the youth academy of Danish side AGF at the age of five.

== Career ==
Siim started his career with Danish side AGF. In 2001, he signed for Danish side OB. In 2004, he was sent on loan to Danish side Sønderjyske. In 2005, he signed for Icelandic side FH. After that, he signed for Danish side Randers. In 2006, he returned to Icelandic side FH. On 10 August 2006, he debuted for the club against Fylkir.

== Style of play ==
Siim mainly operated as a midfielder. He operated as a left-back while playing for Danish side AGF.

== Personal life ==
Siim's family has been based in Aarhus, Denmark. He has a daughter.

== Honours ==
OB

- Danish Cup: 2001–02
