= Kaj Christiansen =

Danish footballer (1921-2008)

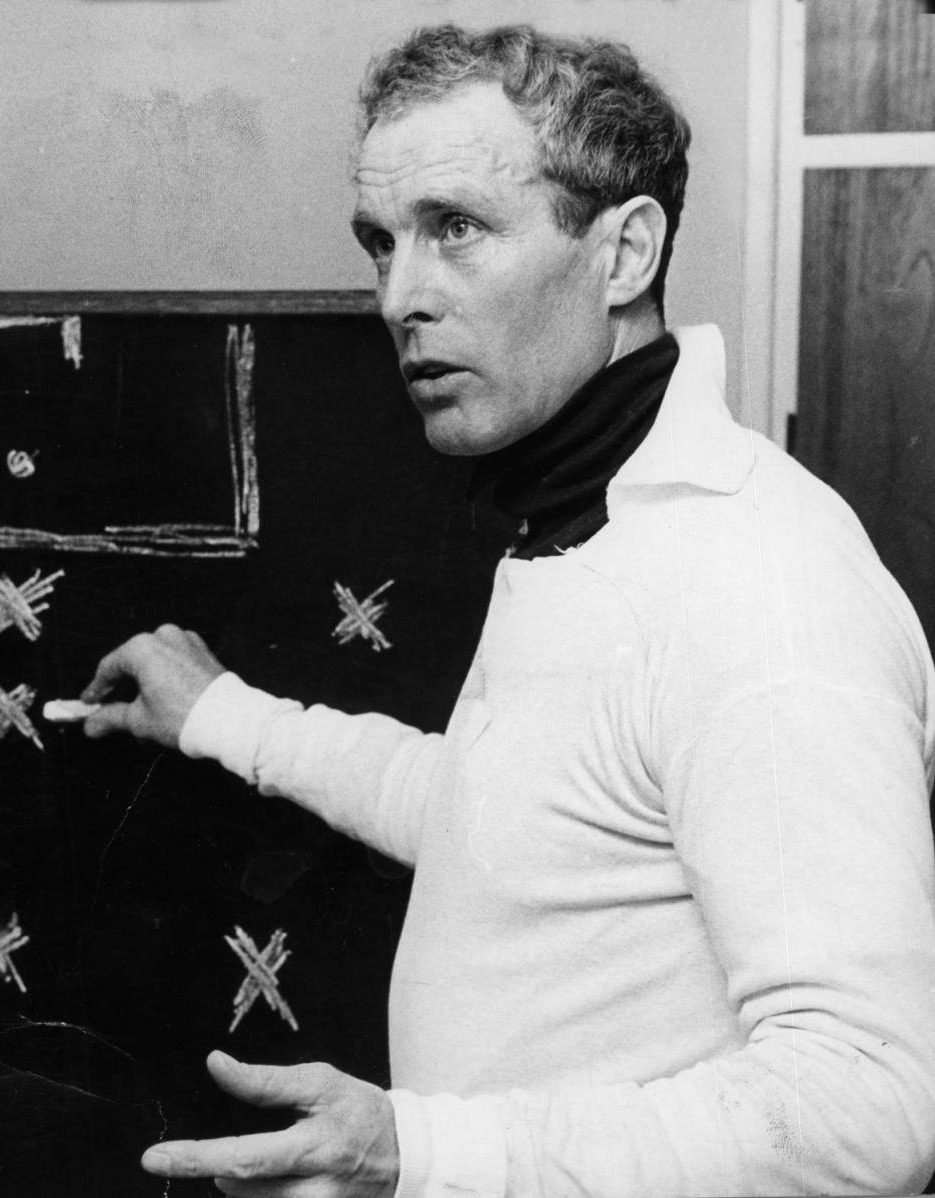
- Kaj Christiansen in 1943

Personal information
- Full name: Kaj Frederik Christiansen
- Date of birth: 19 March 1921
- Place of birth: Vanløse, Denmark
- Date of death: 14 January 2008 (aged 86)
- Place of death: Hyères, France
- Position: Forward

Youth career
- Frem
- KFUM

Senior career*
Years	Team	Apps	(Gls)
1939–1941	KFUM		
1942	Hørsholm		
1942	KFUM		
1942	Roskilde		
1942–1948	Frem	103	(76)
1948–1949	Stade Français	21	(7)
1949–1952	Le Havre	61	(20)
1952–1954	Lyon	52	(14)
1954–1955	Grenoble	20	(2)

International career
1943–1948	Denmark	5	(6)

Managerial career
- Boldklubben Frem
- 1965–1967: Randers Freja
- Vorup FB
- * Club domestic league appearances and goals

Kaj Frederik Christiansen (19 March 1921 – 14 January 2008) was a Danish football player and manager. He began his career as an amateur player for BK Frem, winning the 1944 Danish Championship. He played professionally for French clubs Stade Français, Le Havre AC, Olympique Lyonnais, and Grenoble Foot 38, winning the 1954 French Division 2 with Olympique Lyonnais. Kaj Christiansen scored six goals in five matches for the Denmark national football team between 1943 and 1948. He was named 1943 Danish Sports Talent of the Year. As a manager, he was named 1964 Manager of the Year in France, and won the 1967 Danish Cup with Randers Freja.

== Biography ==
Kaj Christiansen started his amateur footballing career with KFUM's Boldklub, but like so many of his prolific KFUM teammates, he eventually moved to a larger Copenhagen club to make his national breakthrough. Christiansen moved to BK Frem, where he made his senior debut against Kjøbenhavns Boldklub (KB) on 21 March 1943. He scored four goals in the first half, but KB retaliated with six goals in the second half, and Frem lost 4–6. Playing in the centre forward position, Christiansen was seen as the natural successor of Frem's club icon and the most popular Danish footballer of his time, centre forward Pauli Jørgensen. Rather than Jørgensen's physical style, Kaj Christiansen was a quick player of great anticipation.

Just months after his debut for Frem, Christiansen made his debut for the Denmark national football team in June 1943, the last Danish international game during the Second World War. He scored two goals on headers in the debut game, a 3–2 win against the Sweden men's national football team, with Danish King Christian X in attendance. He was subsequently named 1943 Danish Sports Talent of the Year. In his first season with Frem, Kaj Christiansen and the team won the 1943–44 Danish Championship. When the Danish national team played its next games in 1945, Christiansen played two games and scored two goals that year. He scored two additional goals in another two international games, playing one each in 1946 and 1948. In 1948, Kaj Christiansen signed a professional contract. He was thus ineligible to play for the amateur-only Danish national team, and was not picked for the Danish team which won bronze medals at the 1948 Summer Olympics.

Kaj Christiansen played seven seasons as a professional in French football. He signed with French team Stade Français in 1948. He played a single season in the club, finishing 10th in the 1948–49 French Division 1 season. He then moved to Division 2 team Le Havre AC, which he helped finish 2nd in the 1949–50 French Division 2, winning promotion for Division 1. He stayed a further two seasons with Le Havre, helping the club to impressive 3rd and 7th-place finishes in the Division 1. In 1952, Christiansen moved to newly relegated Division 2 team Olympique Lyonnais. In his second year at the club, Lyonnais won the 1953–54 French Division 2 and secured promotion for Division 1. Kaj Christiansen moved on to Division 2 team Grenoble Foot 38, for whom he played his last season as an active player.

Following his active career, Christiansen turned to the role of football coach. He took a coaching license in France, and was named 1964 Manager of the Year in France. He returned to Denmark, and coached Randers Freja for some years, culminating in winning the 1967 Danish Cup tournament. He also coached minor team Vorup and his old club BK Frem. In 1969, he and his family moved back to live in Hyères, France. Here, he coached several French teams, and got a job as a physical education teacher.

== Honours ==
=== Club ===
Frem

- Danish Championship: 1943–44

Lyon

- French Division 2: 1953–54

=== Individual ===
- Danish Sports Talent of the Year: 1943
- Manager of the Year in France: 1964

=== Coach ===
Randers Freja

- Danish Cup: 1967
