= Fredericia Stadium =

Football stadium in Fredericia, Denmark

Fredericia Stadium Monjasa Park
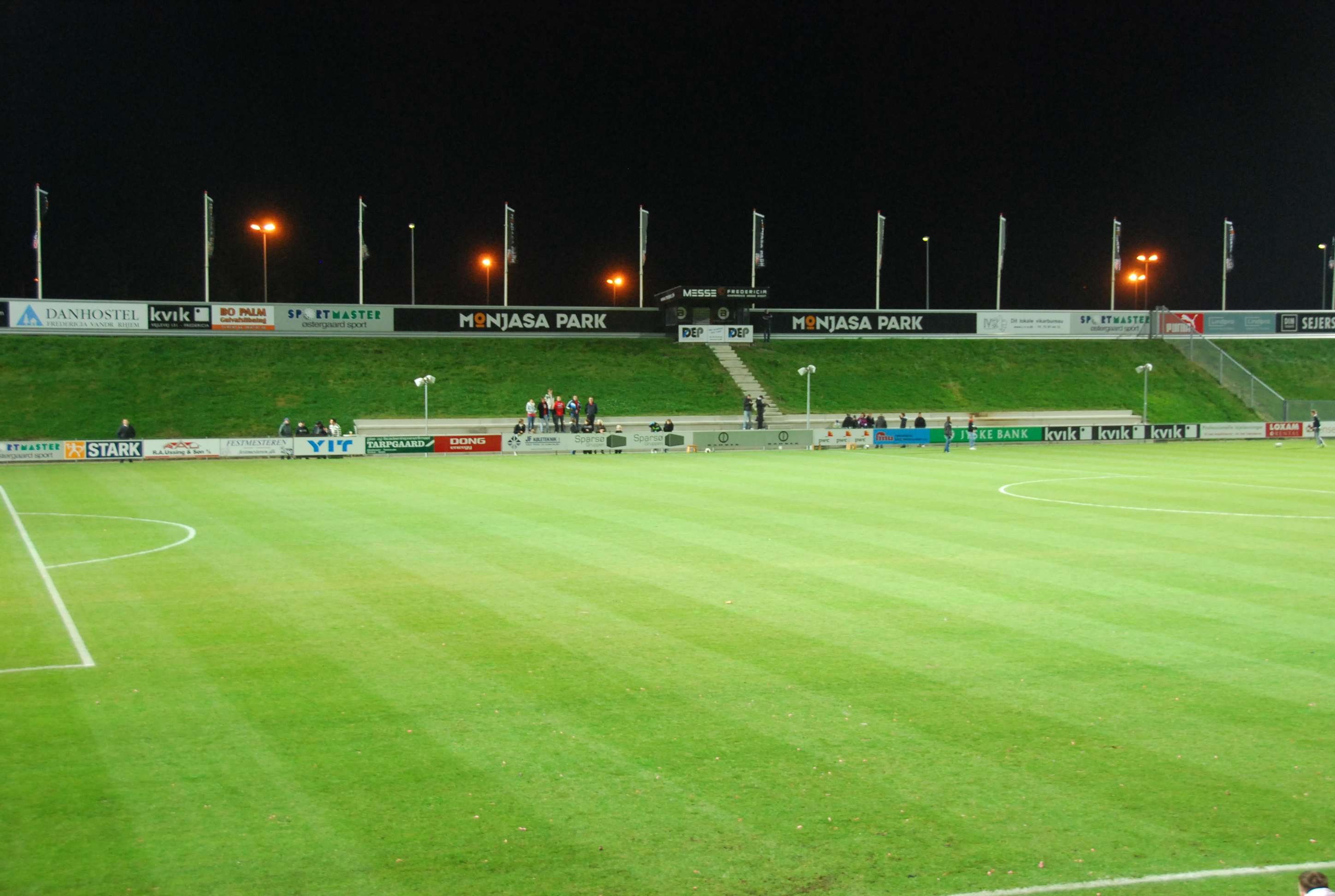
- Monjasa Park in 2011
- Interactive map of Fredericia Stadium; Monjasa Park
- Full name: Fredericia Stadion
- Location: Vestre Ringvej 102; Fredericia; Denmark
- Coordinates: 55°34′42″N 9°43′43″E
- Owner: Fredericia Municipality
- Capacity: 10,000
- Surface: Grass
- Record attendance: 5,100 (FC Fredericia vs FC Copenhagen, 26 September 2007)
- Field size: 105 by 68 metres (114.8 yd × 74.4 yd)

Construction
- Groundbreaking: December 2005
- Built: 2005–2006
- Opened: 2 September 2006; 20 years ago
- Expanded: 2025
- Cost: DKK 50 million (2004)

Tenant
- FC Fredericia

Fredericia Stadium (Danish: Fredericia Stadion, Danish pronunciation: [fʁeðɐˈʁetɕæ ˈstɛˀtjʌn, fʁæðɐˈʁætɕæ -]), currently known as Monjasa Park (Danish pronunciation: [mʌnˈtɕæsæ ˈpʰɑːk]) for sponsorship reasons, is a football stadium in Fredericia, Denmark. It was inaugurated on 2 September 2006 and serves as the home ground of Danish 1st Division club FC Fredericia. The stadium has a capacity of 6,000 spectators.

In May 2020, Fredericia Municipality announced plans to modernise Monjasa Park, including the construction of a new stand with 1,400 seats and terracing for 500 away supporters. The upgrades aimed to improve infrastructure and bring the stadium in line with requirements for a potential promotion to the Danish Superliga, which then-mayor Jacob Bjerregaard stated could occur within "the next 2–3 years". The new stand was completed in April 2021, bringing the total capacity to 6,000.
