= Stefan Schmidt (footballer, born 1975) =

Danish footballer (born 1975)

Personal information
- Date of birth: 7 November 1975 (age 50)
- Place of birth: Holbæk, Denmark
- Height: 1.82 m (6 ft 0 in)
- Position: Midfielder

Senior career*
Years	Team	Apps	(Gls)
1996–1997	Næstved BK	30	
1997–1998	Aarhus GF	1	(0)
1998–2000	→ Holbæk B&IF (loan)		
2000–2001	Farum BK		
2001	Lyngby FC	16	(2)
2001–2004	Aalborg BK	56	(5)
2004–2007	Brøndby IF	21	(0)
2007–2009	Silkeborg IF	34	(3)
2009–2010	FC Roskilde	13	(3)
2010–2012	Brønshøj BK		
2012–????	Skovshoved IF		
2016–2021	FC Græsrødderne		
- * Club domestic league appearances and goals

Stefan Schmidt (born 7 November 1975) is a Danish retired professional footballer. Generally playing a defensive midfielder and central midfielder role, Schmidt was a midfield workhorse with a strong tackle and good technical and passing skills. His long range shooting ability has earned him quite a few goals.

== Biography ==
Schmidt signed his first contract, when he was brought to Danish 1st Division club Næstved BK from lower league club Holbæk B&IF in the summer 1996. He played 30 games for the club, and was brought to Aarhus GF (AGF) under manager Peter Rudbæk in August 1997. He played his only game in his two years at AGF, in the top-flight Danish Superliga championship on 29 August 1997. A recurring knee injury kept him from playing, and in July 1998 he suffered a bout of salmonella. When he recovered, Schmidt was loaned out to his youth club Holbæk B&IF in the Danish 2nd Division from October 1998 and the year out, when his AGF contract would be mutually terminated.

He played at Holbæk until he was brought to 1st Division club Farum BK in July 2000. He played one year at Farum, before moving back to the Danish Superliga to play for Lyngby FC in June 2001. When Lyngby went bankrupt in December 2001, Schmidt was brought to league rivals Aalborg Boldspilklub (AaB) by Peter Rudbæk in January 2002. Despite Lyngby only playing half a season, Schmidt was voted as player of the year by the Lyngby FC fanclub. His longest and arguably most successful period as a footballer came during his stay in AaB. He initially had a hard time forcing his way into the team in competition with midfielder Rasmus Würtz, but the 2003-04 season would be his national breakthrough. Schmidt scored five goals in 27 Superliga games, as AaB finished in fifth place, and helped the club to the 2004 Danish Cup final.

When his contract ran out in July 2004, he moved on to Superliga rivals Brøndby IF on a free transfer. He was brought to the club as a replacement for the aging star Morten Wieghorst. In his first game for the club in July 2004, Schmidt suffered a serious knee injury which forced him out for a year of recovery. He returned in August 2005, but received limited playing time at Brøndby. Schmidt did not have many first team appearances, following small injuries and the competition with Martin Retov, Marcus Lantz and Kim Daugaard for the central midfield places in the Brøndby squad. In December 2006, he announced his intent to leave Brøndby when his contract was set to expire in June 2007. He moved to league rivals Silkeborg IF on a free transfer in January 2007.

He returned to his former strength there and become the best player at Silkeborg, but the club was relegated to the Danish first division. Schmidt had offers from Superliga clubs but was offered a very good contract and decided to stay at Silkeborg though playing in the second tier league.

In 2009, he moved to Danish 1st Division club FC Roskilde. In 2010 Roskilde got Carsten Broe as new manager, and he stated that Schmidt was not a part of his future plans for the club, and Schmidt's contract was annulled. In September 2010 he signed with Brønshøj Boldklub.

== Honours ==
- Danish Superliga: 2005
