= 2001–02 Danish 1st Division =

57th season of Danish 1st Division

Danish 1st Division
- Season: 2001–02

The 2001–02 Danish 1st Division season was the 57th season of the Danish 1st Division league championship and the 16th consecutive as a second tier competition governed by the Danish Football Association.

The division-champion and runner-up promoted to the 2002–03 Danish Superliga. The teams in the 15th and 16th relegated to the 2002–03 Danish 2nd Division.

== Table ==
Pos	Team	Pld	W	D	L	GF	GA	GD	Pts	Promotion or relegation
1	Køge BK (C, P)	30	21	4	5	62	33	+29	67	Promotion to Danish Superliga
2	Farum BK (P)	30	20	6	4	69	33	+36	66	Promotion to Danish Superliga
3	HFK Sønderjylland	30	17	4	9	61	50	+11	55	
4	BK Frem	30	15	9	6	54	37	+17	54	
5	Herfølge BK	30	15	8	7	58	36	+22	53	
6	Randers Freja	30	15	6	9	62	38	+24	51	
7	AC Horsens	30	12	8	10	39	31	+8	44	
8	B 1913	30	11	10	9	42	49	−7	43	
9	FC Aarhus	30	11	9	10	42	42	0	42	
10	Hvidovre IF	30	8	8	14	43	52	−9	32	
11	FC Fredericia	30	7	9	14	45	46	−1	30	
12	B 1909	30	8	5	17	46	67	−21	29	
13	Brønshøj BK	30	7	7	16	42	63	−21	28	
14	B 93	30	7	7	16	37	59	−22	28	
15	Kolding IF (R)	30	7	6	17	45	65	−20	27	Relegation to Danish 2nd Divisions
16	Skive IK (R)	30	3	6	21	36	82	−46	15	Relegation to Danish 2nd Divisions

Rules for classification: 1) points; 2) goal difference; 3) number of goals scored.
(C) Champions; (P) Promoted; (R) Relegated

== Top goalscorers ==
Position	Player	Club	Goals
1	Mirko Selak	BK Frem	20
2	Tommy Olsen	Køge BK	18
3	Jeppe Tengbjerg	Farum BK	16
4	Brian Jochumsen	FC Fredericia	15
5	Lars Larsen	Randers Freja	14
6	Chris Hermansen	Herfølge BK	12
-	Martin Jeppesen	BK Frem	12
-	Henrik Asmussen	HFK Sønderjylland	12
-	Mogens Hjort	Kolding IF	12
-	Michael Laursen	Randers Freja	12

== See also ==
- 2001–02 in Danish football
- 2001–02 Danish Superliga
