= Henning Gronemann =

Danish footballer (1929–2016)

Henning Gronemann (born Henning Jensen, 26 December 1929 – 6 January 2016 ) was a Danish amateur football (soccer) player, who played for BK Frem in Denmark. He was the top goalscorer of the 1955 Danish football championship. He played one game for the Denmark national football team in 1954, and also played for the Denmark national under-21 football team.
