= Ole Mørk =

Danish football manager and former player

Personal information
- Full name: Ole Mørk
- Date of birth: 28 May 1948 (age 78)
- Place of birth: Copenhagen, Denmark
- Position: Forward

Youth career
- Boldklubben Frem

Senior career*
Years	Team	Apps	(Gls)
1967–1980	Boldklubben Frem	345	(110)

International career
1970	Denmark U21	4	(0)

Managerial career
- 1981: Boldklubben Frem (reserves)
- 1982–1984: Tårnby BK
- 1985–1989: Helsingør IF
- 1990–1993: Boldklubben Frem
- 1993–1998: Herfølge BK
- 1998–2000: Akademisk Boldklub
- 2000–2001: Trelleborgs FF
- 2001–2003: Boldklubben Frem
- 2005: B93
- 2010–2011: HB Køge (youth)
- * Club domestic league appearances and goals

Ole Mørk (born 28 May 1948), sometimes known as Ole Mørch, is a Danish football manager and former player, who was most recently youth coach at HB Køge. He has worked for several TV stations as a commentator and recently as a football columnist from January until June 2007 with Danish newspaper Politiken. From 2007 until 2010 he was self-employed as a personal coach.

== Honours ==
=== Manager ===
Akademisk Boldklub

- Danish Cup: 1998–99
