= Søren Lyng =

Danish footballer

Personal information
- Full name: Søren Lyng Christiansen
- Date of birth: 8 July 1966 (age 60)
- Place of birth: Gentofte, Denmark
- Position: Forward

Youth career
- 1971–1981: Virum-Sorgenfri
- 1981–1984: Akademisk Boldklub

Senior career*
Years	Team	Apps	(Gls)
1984–1986	Akademisk Boldklub		
1987–1991	Frem	131	(58)
1991–1992	B 1903		
1992–1993	F.C. Copenhagen	14	(6)
1994–1995	Lyngby	15	(5)
1995–1997	Herfølge Boldklub		
1997–1998	Vedbæk		

International career
1990–1991	Denmark	2	(0)
- * Club domestic league appearances and goals

Søren Lyng Christiansen (born 8 July 1966) is a Danish former professional football forward who won the 1993 Danish football championship with F.C. Copenhagen and made two international caps.

== Honours ==
Club

- Danish Championships: 1992-93 with F.C. Copenhagen
