= Baneklubberne Tournaments =

1911 Danish football tournaments

The Baneklubberne Tournaments were two Danish football tournaments held in the autumn of 1911, in Copenhagen. One round-robin style league tournament, and one knockout-based cup tournament were played.

Football clubs in Copenhagen would usually participate in the league and cup tournaments organized by the Copenhagen Football Association, but in 1911 a dispute between the clubs that owned their own fields, and those that did not, meant that only those not owning their own field participated in the regular tournaments. These clubs were known as Fælledklubberne (Danish for the green clubs). The field owning clubs, known as Baneklubberne (Danish for the field clubs) created their own tournaments.

== League ==
Pos	Club	Pld	W	D	L	F	A	Pts
1	KB	6	5	1	0	22	6	11
2	AB	6	2	2	2	16	25	6
3	Frem	6	2	0	4	21	22	4
4	B 93	6	1	1	4	15	21	3

P = Matches played; W = Matches won; D = Matches drawn; L = Matches lost; F = Goals for; A = Goals against; Pts = Points

== Cup ==
Quarterfinals
B 93	8
Dania	3

Semifinals
B 93	1
Frem	7
KB	8
AB	0

Finals
Frem	3
KB	2
