= Leif Nielsen (footballer, born 1943) =

Danish footballer

Personal information
- Full name: Leif Nielsen
- Date of birth: 31 March 1943 (age 83)
- Place of birth: Copenhagen, Denmark
- Position: Forward

Youth career
- Fremad Amager
- BK Frem

Senior career*
Years	Team	Apps	(Gls)
1962–1972	BK Frem	202	(98)

International career
1964–1965	Denmark U21	4	(4)
- * Club domestic league appearances and goals

Leif Nielsen (born 31 March 1943) is a Danish former football (soccer) player, who played for Fremad Amager and BK Frem in Denmark. Nielsen was the top goalscorer of the 1967 Danish football championship. He played four games and scored four goals for the Denmark national under-21 football team.
