= 1999–2000 Danish 1st Division =

55th season of Danish 1st Division

Danish 1st Division
- Season: 1999–2000

The 1999–2000 Danish 1st Division season was the 55th season of the Danish 1st Division league championship and the 14th consecutive as a second tier competition governed by the Danish Football Association.

The division-champion and runner-up promoted to the 2000–01 Danish Superliga. The teams in the 13th to 16th spots relegated to the 2000–01 Danish 2nd Division.

== Table ==
Pos	Team	Pld	W	D	L	GF	GA	GD	Pts	Promotion or relegation
1	FC Midtjylland (C, P)	30	24	4	2	78	17	+61	76	Promotion to Danish Superliga
2	Haderslev FK (P)	30	19	5	6	67	42	+25	62	Promotion to Danish Superliga
3	B 93	30	18	7	5	69	39	+30	61	
4	Køge BK	30	15	8	7	65	40	+25	53	
5	AC Horsens	30	14	8	8	57	31	+26	50	
6	Randers Freja	30	15	4	11	57	49	+8	49	
7	BK Frem	30	12	9	9	55	48	+7	45	
8	Farum BK	30	12	6	12	48	58	−10	42	
9	Hvidovre IF	30	11	7	12	55	52	+3	40	
10	Ølstykke FC	30	9	9	12	42	60	−18	36	
11	BK Fremad Amager	30	10	5	15	43	48	−5	35	
12	FC Aarhus	30	8	11	11	38	43	−5	35	
13	Dalum IF (R)	30	8	8	14	35	57	−22	32	Relegation to Danish 2nd Divisions
14	Svendborg fB (R)	30	5	5	20	27	56	−29	20	Relegation to Danish 2nd Divisions
15	FC Fredericia (R)	30	4	5	21	24	61	−37	17	Relegation to Danish 2nd Divisions
16	B 1909 (R)	30	3	5	22	32	90	−58	14	Relegation to Danish 2nd Divisions

Rules for classification: 1) points; 2) goal difference; 3) number of goals scored.
(C) Champions; (P) Promoted; (R) Relegated

== Top goalscorers ==
Position	Player	Club	Goals
1	Christian Lundberg	FC Midtjylland	22

== See also ==
- 1999–2000 in Danish football
- 1999–2000 Danish Superliga
