= Søren Andersen (footballer, born 1937) =

Danish footballer (1937–1960)

Søren Andersen (16 July 1937 – 16 July 1960) was a Danish amateur association footballer who played as a forward for BK Frem. He was the top goalscorer of the 1957 Danish football championship, and played four games and scored two goals for the Denmark national under-21 football team.

On his 23rd birthday, Andersen was one of eight players killed in an air crash near Copenhagen travelling to a trial match before the 1960 Olympic tournament.
