= Michael Pedersen (footballer) =

Danish footballer (born 1963)

Michael "Mex" Pedersen
Personal information
- Date of birth: 11 June 1963 (age 63)
- Place of birth: Esbjerg, Denmark
- Position: Striker

Senior career*
| Years | Team | Apps | (Gls) |
| 1982–1985 | Esbjerg | 114 | (46) |
| 1985–1987 | Osasuna | 18 | (1) |
| 1987–1989 | Esbjerg fB | 45 | (22) |
| 1990–1991 | Ikast | 16 | (0) |
| 1992–1997 | Esbjerg fB | 188 | (76) |
| Total | | 381 | (145) |

Managerial career
- 2015: Esbjerg fB (caretaker)
- 2017–2019: Denmark U16
- 2017–2018: Denmark U17
- 2019–2020: Denmark U17
- 2022–2023: Ringkøbing
- * Club domestic league appearances and goals

Michael "Mex" Pedersen (born 11 June 1963) is a Danish football manager and former footballer who most recently managed Ringkøbing IF.

== Career ==
Pedersen started his career with Danish side Esbjerg, where he became the club's all-time top scorer. He was described as a "club legend". While playing football in Denmark, he also worked in advertising. In 1986, he signed for Spanish La Liga side Osasuna, becoming the first foreign player to sign for the club. He was regarded to not have performed well for them.

== Style of play ==
Pedersen mainly operated as a striker and was known for his shooting ability in Denmark.

== Managerial career ==
After retiring from professional football, Pedersen worked as a youth manager, where he managed players including Denmark international Martin Braithwaite. In 2015, he was appointed caretaker manager of Danish side Esbjerg.

Pedersen managed Denmark Series club Ringkøbing from 2022 to 2023, where he stepped down due to personal reasons.

== Personal life ==
Pedersen speaks Danish, English, and German.
