= Mirko Selak =

Croatian footballer (born 1978)

Personal information
- Full name: Mirko Selak
- Date of birth: 30 January 1978 (age 48)
- Place of birth: Split, SFR Yugoslavia
- Height: 1.82 m (6 ft 0 in)
- Position: Striker

Youth career
- Zmaj Makarska
- Hajduk Split

Senior career*
Years	Team	Apps	(Gls)
1997–2000	Mosor		
2000–2001	B 93	34	(13)
2001–2005	Frem	101	(57)
2005–2007	Metalurh Zaporizhzhia	24	(3)
2007	Istra 1961	12	(1)
2007	Mosor	13	(1)
2008	Anagennisi Artas		
2008	Pyrsos Grevena		
2009	Anagennisi Karditsas	3	(0)
2009–2011	Zmaj Makarska	54	(19)
2011–2013	Urania Baška Voda	20+	(2+)
2013–2019	Zmaj Makarska	115	(6)

International career
- Croatia U17
- Croatia U19
- * Club domestic league appearances and goals as of 3 October 2023

Mirko Selak (born 30 January 1978) is a Croatian retired football forward.

== Career ==
Starting in his local club NK Zmaj Makarska before moving on to the HNK Hajduk Split academy, Selak played his first few senior seasons at Hajduk's then satellite club NK Mosor, before being signed by B 93 in Denmark. Selak was the top scorer in the Danish first division in 2002.

Selak competed in the UEFA Europa League for Ukrainian club FC Metalurh Zaporizhzhya in 2006.

== Honours ==
- Danish 1st Division Top Goalscorer: 2001–02
