= Christian Lundberg =

Danish footballer (born 1970)

Personal information
- Date of birth: 25 February 1975 (age 51)
- Place of birth: Skive, Denmark
- Height: 1.78 m (5 ft 10 in)
- Position: Forward

Senior career*
Years	Team	Apps	(Gls)
1990–1991	Vejle	7	(2)
1991–1992	Esbjerg		
1992–1995	Skive		
1996–1999	Ikast	46	(21)
1999–2001	Midtjylland	37	(25)
2001	AB	28	(10)
2002	Ethnikos Asteras	4	(0)
2002–2003	Aarhus Fremad		
2003–2004	Aalborg	34	(17)
2005	Randers	14	(3)
2005–2006	Skive		
2006	KÍ Klaksvík	14	(3)
2007	GÍ Gøta	11	(13)
Total		195	(94)
- * Club domestic league appearances and goals

Christian Lundberg (born 24 August 1970) is a Danish retired football striker. He was the top goal scorer of the 1999–2000 Danish 1st Division.
