= AC Ballerup =

Danish football club

- Full name: Alliance Club Ballerup
- Founded: 1 January 1996
- Dissolved: 30 June 2002
- Ground: Ballerup Idrætspark, Copenhagen
- Capacity: 4,000
Home colours

Alliance Club Ballerup (or AC Ballerup, ACB) is a former Danish football club, located in Ballerup outside of Copenhagen, that was founded on 1 January 1996 and folded on 30 June 2002.

The club was the result of a superstructure over several other football clubs; Ballerup Idræts Forening, Grantoftens Idræts Forening, Ballerup Fodbold Club Lundegården and Lille Hema af 1973, and was composed of one senior team and a couple of youth teams. At one point Skovlunde Idrætsforening, which was their league license the club was using, was also involved, but the club pulled out shortly before the club was dissolved in 2002. The club never reached higher than the fourth level in Danish football.
