= 2002–03 Danish 1st Division =

58th season of Danish 1st Division

Danish 1st Division
- Season: 2002–03

The 2002–03 Danish 1st Division season was the 58th season of the Danish 1st Division league championship and the 17th consecutive as a second-tier competition governed by the Danish Football Association.

The division-champion and runner-up promoted to the 2003–04 Danish Superliga. The teams in the 14th, 15th and 16th relegated to the 2003–04 Danish 2nd Division.

== Table ==
Pos	Team	Pld	W	D	L	GF	GA	GD	Pts	Promotion or relegation
1	Herfølge BK (C, P)	30	22	3	5	74	38	+36	69	Promotion to Danish Superliga
2	BK Frem (P)	30	18	4	8	64	43	+21	58	Promotion to Danish Superliga
3	FC Fredericia	30	14	9	7	50	29	+21	51	
4	Randers FC	30	15	6	9	65	49	+16	51	
5	Vejle BK	30	15	4	11	65	58	+7	49	
6	HFK Sønderjylland	30	13	8	9	64	54	+10	47	
7	BK Skjold	30	14	4	12	50	38	+12	46	
8	Ølstykke FC	30	11	8	11	65	61	+4	41	
9	FC Aarhus	30	12	4	14	53	56	−3	40	
10	Brønshøj BK	30	11	6	13	48	53	−5	39	
11	AC Horsens	30	9	9	12	45	49	−4	36	
12	B 93	30	10	6	14	44	52	−8	36	
13	B 1913	30	8	6	16	37	60	−23	30	
14	Hvidovre IF (R)	30	7	8	15	34	57	−23	29	Relegation to Danish 2nd Divisions
15	B 1909 (R)	30	7	7	16	52	75	−23	28	Relegation to Danish 2nd Divisions
16	Hellerup IK (R)	30	5	6	19	37	75	−38	21	Relegation to Danish 2nd Divisions

Source: RSSSF
Rules for classification: 1) points; 2) goal difference; 3) number of goals scored.
(C) Champions; (P) Promoted; (R) Relegated

== See also ==
- 2002–03 in Danish football
- 2002–03 Danish Superliga
