= Ølstykke FC =

Danish association football club

- Full name: Ølstykke Fodbold Club af 1918
- Short name: ØFC
- Founded: 18 May 1918; 108 years ago
- Ground: Ølstykke Stadium, Ølstykke
- Capacity: 3,000 (400 seats)
- Chairman: Jakob Dietzer-Fog
- Manager: Kasper Riis
- League: Zealand Series
- 2023–24: DBU Zealand Series 1, Group 1, 3rd of 14 (promoted)
Home colours	Away colours

Ølstykke Fodbold Club af 1918 Danish pronunciation: [ˈølstøkə]; also known as Ølstykke FC or ØFC) is an association football club based in the town of Ølstykke on Zealand, Denmark. The men's team competes in the Zealand Series, one of the sixth tiers of the Danish football league system and the first tier of the regional DBU Zealand competitions.

The club was founded on 18 May 1918 as Ølstykke Idrætsforening, as the club also had a basketball department. In 1986, the name was changed to Ølstykke FC as the club wanted to focus solely on football.

== History ==
=== Formation and rise through the divisions ===
Ølstykke Idrætsforening (Ø.I.F.) was founded as a sports association on 18 May 1918 with Aksel Larsen as the club's first chairman, and over the years had both association football and basketball as its main departments. The club joined the Zealand FA in 1938. In September 1986, the sports association was dissolved, but already in January 1986, the football department was formed as an independent association under the new name Ølstykke Fodbold Club 1918 (ØFC) at a general board meeting. On 11 January 1986, Ølstykke Idræts Union was established at the founding general meeting and was to function as an umbrella organization for all sports associations in Ølstykke and a mouthpiece for, among others, Ølstykke Municipality. The board had a year before expressed a desire to focus solely on football and channel future funds and income to the club's first team under the project Resultater for alle pengene ("Results for all the money"). The first team experienced a series of successive promotions, starting from the local DBU Zealand Series 1 in 1981, to the Denmark Series in 1986 and finally advancing to the then third best Danish football series, 3rd Division East, in the 1988 season.

The club had previously flirted with the idea of becoming the first non-professional club in the Danish Superliga, the highest tier of the Danish football league system, which was said in half-serious half-joking fashion, and was to signal that the club's management had no intentions of running a professional football organization despite a promotion. This stance changed at the beginning of 1996, when permission was granted to introduce professional football, including a new Aktieselskab (a holding company of sorts) with its own separate management, with the aim of ensuring greater continuity in the first-team squad. The club's first team played in the second tier for a number of seasons, with the team's best result being a 5th place (only one spot and three points from promotion to the Superliga), which happened in the spring season of 1995 in the former Kvalifikationsligaen. The club's best result in the Danish Cup is reaching the semi-finals two consecutive seasons (1989–90 season and the 1990–91 season). Former first team coaches for the club's first team include Michael Schäfer (1996–1998), Benny Johansen (2002–2004), Michele Guarini (2004–2006) and Clement Cliford (2008).

=== Plans of Egedal mergers ===
At the beginning of the 2000s, a youth collaboration was formed for the age groups U16, U17 and U19 between Ølstykke FC and nearby football clubs Stenløse Boldklub and Slagslunde-Ganløse Idrætsforening under the common team name "Team Egedal".

The first team which was represented in the higher tiers was renamed FC Egedal on 1 July 2009, and a new logo was created alongside a new green and white uniform, with plans of functioning as a professional superstructure of its parent club after an approval was granted by the Danish Football Union (DBU). Prior to this, the club board had failed in an attempt to buy out neighbour club Stenløse Boldklub to establish a broad elite superstructure between the two clubs. Italian head coach, Giuseppe Favasuli, who took over as head coach in Ølstykke in May 2008, was scheduled to continue as the first head coach of the elite club's senior team in the Danish 2nd Division West. However, all plans were abandoned shortly after, at the end of July of the same year, due to major financial problems in the professional company behind the elite team. As a consequence of its filing for bankruptcy in the DBU, the first team was forcibly relegated down two divisions before the start of the new season, and had to start the 2009–10 season in the highest regional division of the DBU Zealand, the Zealand Series.

In 2011, the club eventually merged with the neighboring club Stenløse Boldklub and became SC Egedal. In 2015, Stenløse left the merger, and Ølstykke FC was re-established in Series 3, one of the bottom tiers of Danish football.

== Honours ==
- Danish Cup
  - Best result: Semi-finals (1989, 1990)

== Seasons ==
Season	League											DBU- Pokal	Top goalscorer(s)	
Season	Div	League	Pld	W	D	L	GF	GA	GD	Pts	Pos.	DBU- Pokal	Player(s)	Goals
1998–99	3	2nd D	30	14	9	7	72	52	+20	51	3rd	R2	?	?
1999–2000	2	1st D	30	9	9	12	42	60	-18	36	10th	R3	?	?
2000–01	2	1st D	30	8	6	16	38	76	-38	30	15th	R3	(Denmark) Kenneth Fuhr Pedersen	14
2001–02	3	2nd D	30	18	5	7	60	32	+28	59	2nd	R3	?	?
2002–03	2	1st D	30	11	8	11	65	61	+ 4	41	8th	R2	(Denmark) Danny Jung	16
2003–04	2	1st D	30	13	4	13	59	54	+6	43	7th	R5	(Denmark) Mads Junker	19
2004–05	2	1st D	30	8	6	16	39	68	-29	30	13th	QF	?	?
2005–06	2	1st D	30	12	5	13	41	40	+1	41	8th	R2	(Denmark) Christian L. Brøndum	11
Total	–	–	240	93	52	95	416	443	-26	331	—	—	—	

2. Top goalscorer(s) includes League goals only.

== See also ==
- Ølstykke FC players
