= FC Horsens =

Danish football club

- Full name: Football Club Horsens
- Founded: 31 October 1987; 37 years ago
- Ground: Bankager Stadion, Horsens
- Chairman: Mogens Hansen
- Manager: Kurt Ross
- League: Series 2 – Group 19 (seventh tier)
Home colours	Away colours

FC Horsens, founded 31 October 1987 as a merger between Dagnæs IF and B 1940, is a Danish football club, based in southern Horsens. They are currently playing in the Series 2 of the DBU Jutland, the seventh tier of Danish football but have also played in the Denmark Series (fourth tier) as well as the Qualification Series. FC Horsens competed in the 2005 and 2006 Danish Cup tournaments.

At youth level, the club is a part of the AC Horsens superstructure. However at senior level, it is an independent club. One of FC Horsens most notably former players is the present AC Horsens goalkeeper Søren Jochumsen.
