= Martin Jeppesen =

Danish footballer (born 1970)

Personal information
- Full name: Martin Jeppesen
- Date of birth: 29 December 1970 (age 55)
- Place of birth: Denmark
- Height: 1.87 m (6 ft 2 in)
- Positions: Attacking midfielder; winger; striker

Youth career
- 1981–1992: BK Frem

Senior career*
Years	Team	Apps	(Gls)
1992–1994	BK Frem	21	(5)
1994–1996	Herfølge BK	7	(0)
1996–2007	BK Frem	247	(83)
2010–2011	BK Frem		

Managerial career
- 2010–2011: BK Frem (player assistant)
- 2011–2013: BK Frem (assistant)
- * Club domestic league appearances and goals

Martin Jeppesen (left) & Henrik Jensen (right) in their first training match with Frem

Martin Jeppesen or just Jeppe (born 29 December 1970) is a Danish football player who has spent the majority of his career with Boldklubben Frem.

Jeppesens father Jørn Jeppesen made around 260 first-team appearances for Frem, scoring 99 goals. Jeppesen was said to be chasing this record.

Jeppesen is also related to Jim Voss, the former chairman of BK Frem's amateur branch.

Jeppesen retired from football in 2007, but after the BK Frem bankruptcy in 2010, joined his former club as playing assistant manager to John 'Tune' Kristiansen.
