= Tommy Olsen =

Danish footballer and manager

Personal information
- Full name: Tommy Olsen
- Date of birth: 8 March 1973 (age 53)
- Place of birth: Denmark
- Height: 1.80 m (5 ft 11 in)
- Position: Striker

Team information
- Current team: Såby Fodbold (manager)

Senior career*
| Years | Team | Apps | (Gls) |
- Tåstrup IF
- Albertslund
| –2003 | Køge Boldklub | 170 | (82) |
| 2003–2006 | FC Nordsjælland | 83 | (29) |
| 2006–2009 | Boldklubben Frem | 61 | (26) |

Managerial career
- 201?–2016: Taastrup FC (assistant)
- 2015–2017: Taastrup FC
- 2018: Køge Nord FC
- 2021–: Såby Fodbold
- * Club domestic league appearances and goals

Tommy Olsen (born 8 March 1973) is a Danish football manager and former professional player who played as a striker. He is the current manager for Såby Fodbold and previous for Taastrup FC and Køge Nord FC.
