= FC Nordjylland =

Danish football club

FC Nordjylland was the professional team of Danish football club Aalborg Chang from season 2001–02 until its liquidation at the end of season 2003–04. The team earned promotion to Danish 1st Division in its final season of existence but had to be disbanded after the main sponsor withdrew his financial support.
