= AC Horsens =

Danish football club

- Full name: Alliance Club Horsens
- Nickname: Den Gule Fare (The Yellow Danger)
- Founded: 1994; 32 years ago
- Ground: Hybel Arena Horsens, Horsens
- Capacity: 10,400 (7,500 seated)
- Chairman: William Harrison Binnie
- Head coach: Niki Zimling
- League: Danish Superliga
- 2025–26: Danish 1st Division, 2nd of 12 (promoted)
- Website: achorsens.dk
Home colours	Away colours

Alliance Club Horsens (Danish: [æliˈɑŋsə ˈkʰlup ˈhɒːsn̩s]), commonly referred to as AC Horsens (Danish: [ɛˀˈse̝ˀ ˈhɒːsn̩s]) or simply Horsens, is a Danish professional football club based in Horsens, Central Denmark Region. Founded in 1994, as a superstructure on Horsens fS (founded 1915), Stensballe IK and FC Horsens, the club competes in the Danish Superliga following promotion in 2025-2026 from the 1st Division, the second tier of the Danish football league system. Both Stensballe IK and FC Horsens has later left the cooperation, and only Horsens fS remains.

== History ==
When the new team started in 1994, Horsens fS had finished sixth in the 1994–95 1st Division season, which qualified AC Horsens to play for promotion to the 1994–95 Superliga through the 1994 Qualifying League. As AC Horsens only won two of 14 matches, and finished last in the Qualifying League, they missed their opportunity of instant promotion for the Superliga.

In the first half of the 1994–95 1st Division season, AC Horsens finished at the bottom of the table after winning only a single game, and did not proceed to the Qualification League. In the second half of the season, AC Horsens managed three victories, but finished last and were relegated to the 2nd Division. AC Horsens spent two seasons in the 2nd Division before winning promotion back to the 1st Division. From the 1997–98 1st Division season forward, AC Horsens established itself as a consistent part of the 1st Division, as they finished just below the promotion candidates for five consecutive seasons.

In July 2001, Horsens hired former Danish international Kent Nielsen as their new manager. The 2002–03 1st Division season did not go well for Den Gule Fare (The Yellow Danger). After the winterbreak halfway through the season, the club was close to relegation to the 2nd Division, but a good ending of the season secured an 11th place, seven points from the relegation zone. In the next season, ACH started out on amazing form. After 15 matches, AC Horsens were leading the 1st Division with 40 points, but a weak finish to the season saw the club surpassed by Silkeborg IF and Randers FC, who won promotion to the Superliga four points ahead of Horsens. In the 2004–05 1st Division season, Horsens finally succeeded in winning promotion. Though amassing only one point more than in the 2003–04 season, AC Horsens finished in the runner-up spot, trailing winners SønderjyskE by a single point.

In their first year in the Superliga, AC Horsens became famous for their strong defence, as they finished in 10th place and avoided relegation. They drew 13 of 33 matches; 8 of them ending 0–0. They conceded just 41 goals in 33 matches, a statistic only bettered by the defences of the top-three finishing teams that season.

The Superliga season of 2006–07 saw AC Horsens take an early lead over relegation rivals Vejle Boldklub and Silkeborg IF. In the spring of 2007, a slew of strong performances were followed by a series of disappointing defeats and draws, which again brought AC Horsens dangerously close to relegation. New offensive midfielder Henrik Hansen joined the squad midway through the season and became a key player, whereas striker and Canadian national Ali Gerba finished a half-year loan period in the summer of 2007 without being offered a contract. Instead, Brazilian Gilberto Macena from the Danish 2nd Division East team Holbæk B&I became the top scorer for AC Horsens, netting twelve times during the season. The team was relegated from Superliga to 1st Division following the 2020–21 season then promoted back to Superliga after winning the 1st Division in the 2021–22 season.

The 2022–23 season proved challenging for Horsens. The team struggled to maintain a clean sheet from October 2022 to June 2023, conceding a league-high 58 goals. Ultimately, their relegation occurred due to goal difference, narrowly missing out to Lyngby, who had not won in the first 16 fixtures of the season.

== Players ==
=== First-team squad ===
As of 2 September 2026

Note: Flags indicate national team as defined under FIFA eligibility rules; some limited exceptions apply. Players may hold more than one non-FIFA nationality.

No.	Pos.	Nation	Player
1	GK	CRO	Matej Delač (captain)
3	DF	DEN	Christian Vestergaard
5	DF	DEN	Andreas Bruus
6	MF	DEN	Jakob Bonde
7	DF	BIH	Ivan Miličević
11	FW	ENG	Kelvin Ehibhatiomhan
12	DF	CIV	Valassina Diomande
14	MF	DEN	Julius Madsen
15	FW	FRO	Adrian Justinussen
16	MF	GHA	Abdul Moro
17	MF	SWE	Adam Herdonsson
18	FW	FIN	Julius Körkkö
19	MF	FIN	Jimi Tauriainen
20	MF	CRO	Karlo Lusavec

No.	Pos.	Nation	Player
21	DF	GRE	Anestis Tricholidis
22	FW	GHA	John Batigi
23	GK	GER	Dennis Smarsch
24	DF	NOR	Ole Martin Kolskogen
25	FW	SEN	Fallou Sene
26	DF	ISL	Victor Pálsson
27	FW	BEN	Yamirou Ouorou
28	DF	GAM	Alagie Saine
29	MF	DEN	Frederik Brandhof
30	DF	CIV	Seniko Doua
31	GK	DEN	Anders Hoff
37	MF	CIV	Abdoulaye Gouba
77	FW	GAM	Omar Jarju

=== Out on loan ===
Note: Flags indicate national team as defined under FIFA eligibility rules; some limited exceptions apply. Players may hold more than one non-FIFA nationality.

No.	Pos.	Nation	Player
4	DF	DEN	Sebastian Hausner (at AIK until 31 December 2026)
19	FW	KOS	Muhamet Hyseni (at FCV Farul Constanța until 30 June 2027)

== Coaches ==
- (Denmark) Per Bie (1994)
- (Denmark) Christian Møller (1994–96)
- (Denmark) Kim Poulsen (1996–97)
- (Denmark) Troels Bech (1998–99)
- (Denmark) Kim Poulsen (1999)
- (Denmark) Uffe Pedersen (1999–2001)
- (Denmark) Kent Nielsen (July 2001 – December 2008)
- (Denmark) Henrik Jensen (Jan–June 2009)
- (Denmark) Johnny Mølby (July 2009 – June 2014)
- (Denmark) Bo Henriksen (July 2014 – Aug 2020)
- (Denmark) Jonas Dal (Aug 2020 – Dec 2020)
- (Denmark) Jens Berthel Askou (Jan 2021 – Jun 2023)
- (Sweden) Joakim Persson (Jun 2023 – Mar 2024)
- (Denmark) Claus Troelsen (Mar 2024 – Jun 2024)
- (Denmark) Martin Retov (Jul 2024 – Mar 2025)
- (Denmark) David Nielsen (Mar 2025 – Mar 2026)
- (Denmark) Mads Kristensen (Mar 2026 – Apr 2026)
- (Denmark) Niki Zimling (Apr 2026 – Present)

== Honours ==
- Danish Football Championship:
  - Bronze Medalists (1): 1967 (as Horsens FS)
- Danish Cup:
  - Runners-up (1): 2011–12
- UEFA Europa League:
  - Qualified (1): 2012–13 (Playoff Round)
- UEFA Intertoto Cup:
  - Participation (2): 1968 (as Horsens FS), 1970 (as Horsens FS)
- 10 seasons in the Highest Danish League
- 34 seasons in the second highest Danish league
- 24 seasons in the third highest Danish league

== European record ==
Season	Competition	Round	Club	1st leg	2nd leg	Aggregate
2012–13	UEFA Europa League	Third qualifying round	(Sweden) Elfsborg	1–1	3–2	4–3
2012–13	UEFA Europa League	Play-off round	(Portugal) Sporting CP	1–1	0–5	1–6

== Season overview ==
Season		Pos.	Pl.	W	D	L	GS	GA	P	Cup	Notes
1994 spring	QL	8	14	2	4	8	14	30	11	Did not compete	Relegated
1994 autumn	1D	10	18	1	6	11	15	50	8	Third round	
1995 spring	1D	8	14	3	6	5	15	26	12	Third round	Relegated
1995 autumn	2D	6	14	5	3	6	27	29	18	Fourth round	
1996 spring	2D	3	14	6	6	2	27	14	24	Fourth round	
1996 autumn	2D	3	14	9	2	3	35	22	29	Second round	
1997 spring	2D	2	14	8	4	2	32	10	28	Second round	Promoted
1997–98	1D	5	30	12	8	10	49	44	44	Fourth round	
1998–99	1D	6	30	13	5	12	47	44	44	Fourth round	
1999-00	1D	5	30	14	8	8	57	31	50	Fourth round	
2000–01	1D	7	30	11	10	9	41	38	43	Fifth round	
2001–02	1D	7	30	12	8	10	39	31	44	Third round	
2002–03	1D	11	30	9	9	12	45	49	36	Third round	
2003–04	1D	3	30	19	5	6	50	26	62	Quarter-final	
2004–05	1D	2	30	19	6	5	51	23	63	Semi-final	Promoted
2005–06	SL	10	33	8	13	12	29	41	37	Fifth round	
2006–07	SL	10	33	6	10	17	29	53	28	Quarter-final	
2007–08	SL	5	33	14	10	9	47	43	52	Third round	
2008–09	SL	12	33	5	9	19	35	58	24	Quarter-final	Relegated
2009–10	1D	1	30	21	3	6	67	27	66	Third round	Promoted
2010–11	SL	9	33	9	10	14	29	40	37	Quarter-final	
2011–12	SL	4	33	17	6	10	53	39	57	Final	Qualified for 2012–13 UEFA Europa League
2012–13	SL	11	33	8	10	15	31	49	34	Semi-final	Relegated
2013–14	1D	5	33	15	7	11	60	48	52	Semi-final	
2014–15	1D	6	33	10	12	11	43	42	42	Third round	
2015–16	1D	3	33	18	6	9	52	34	60	Third round	Promoted
2016–17	SL	10	36	8	16	12	43	57	40	Fourth round	
2017–18	SL	6	36	8	16	12	43	57	40	Third round	
2018–19	SL	10	34	9	10	15	34	56	33	Fourth round	
2019–20	SL	8	34	13	8	13	38	54	47	Semi-finals	
2020–21	SL	12	32	5	9	18	30	59	24	Fourth round	Relegated
2021–22	1D	1	32	19	7	6	55	29	64	Fourth round	Promoted
2022–23	SL	11	32	7	7	18	33	58	28	round of 16	Relegated
2023–24	1D	8	32	12	7	13	37	45	-8	First Round	
2024–25	1D	3	32	15	6	11	49	48	1	Second Round	
2025–26	1D	2	32	15	9	8	42	27	15	Second Round	
