= List of Danish football transfers summer 2024 =

This is a list of Danish football transfers for the 2024 summer transfer window. Only transfers featuring Danish Superliga and 1. Division are listed.

== Danish Superliga ==
Note: Flags indicate national team as has been defined under FIFA eligibility rules. Players may hold more than one non-FIFA nationality.

=== Midtjylland ===
In:

No.	Pos.	Nation	Player
4	DF	SEN	Ousmane Diao (from (Portugal) Mafra)
17	MF	NOR	Kristoffer Askildsen (from (Italy) Sampdoria)
18	FW	POL	Adam Buksa (from (France) Lens, previously on loan at (Turkey) Antalyaspor)
19	MF	COL	Pedro Bravo (from (Colombia) América de Cali, previously on loan at (Portugal) Mafra)
21	MF	ECU	Denil Castillo (from (Ukraine) Shakhtar Donetsk, previously on loan at (Serbia) Partizan)
30	GK	ENG	Ovie Ejeheri (from (England) Arsenal)

Out:

No.	Pos.	Nation	Player
14	DF	DEN	Henrik Dalsgaard (to AGF)
15	DF	ISL	Sverrir Ingi Ingason (to (Greece) Panathinaikos)
34	DF	ISL	Daníel Freyr Kristjánsson (on loan to Fredericia)
35	MF	BRA	Charles (to (Brazil) Corinthians)
37	MF	BIH	Armin Gigović (loan return to (Russia) Rostov)
50	GK	AUT	Martin Fraisl (to (Portugal) Mafra)
90	GK	DEN	Oscar Hedvall (to Viborg)
—	FW	BRA	Júnior Brumado (on loan to (Brazil) Coritiba, previously on loan at (Germany) Hansa Rostock)
—	GK	DEN	Valdemar Birksø (to Fredericia)
—	GK	NGA	Mark Ugboh (to (Portugal) Mafra, previously on loan at Holstebro)
—	DF	DEN	Mikkel Fischer (to (Norway) Haugesund, previously on loan at Fredericia)

=== Brøndby ===
In:

No.	Pos.	Nation	Player
1	GK	AUT	Patrick Pentz (from (Germany) Bayer Leverkusen, previously on loan)

Out:

No.	Pos.	Nation	Player
20	MF	POL	Mateusz Kowalczyk (on loan to (Poland) GKS Katowice)
40	GK	DEN	Jonathan Ægidius (on loan to Kolding)

=== Copenhagen ===
In:

No.	Pos.	Nation	Player
1	GK	ENG	Nathan Trott (from (England) West Ham United, previously on loan at Vejle)
4	DF	ZIM	Munashe Garananga (from (Belgium) Mechelen)
13	DF	MEX	Rodrigo Huescas (from (Mexico) Cruz Azul)
22	DF	GEO	Giorgi Gocholeishvili (on loan from (Ukraine) Shakhtar Donetsk)
27	MF	DEN	Thomas Delaney (from (Spain) Sevilla, previously on loan at (Belgium) Anderlecht)

Out:

No.	Pos.	Nation	Player
1	GK	POL	Kamil Grabara (to (Germany) VfL Wolfsburg)
5	DF	GEO	Davit Khocholava (retired)
19	DF	DEN	Elias Jelert (to (Turkey) Galatasaray)
22	DF	DEN	Peter Ankersen (to Nordsjælland)
26	DF	SCO	Scott McKenna (loan return to (England) Nottingham Forest)
39	MF	DEN	Oscar Højlund (to (Germany) Eintracht Frankfurt)
44	FW	DEN	Emil Højlund (to (Germany) Schalke 04)
—	FW	FRA	Mamoudou Karamoko (on loan to (Hungary) Újpest, previously on loan at (Hungary) Fehérvár)
—	GK	DEN	Andreas Dithmer (to (Netherlands) Jong Utrecht, previously on loan)
—	MF	ISL	Ísak Bergmann Jóhannesson (to (Germany) Fortuna Düsseldorf, previously on loan)
—	MF	DEN	Daniel Haarbo (to Fredericia, previously on loan at Aarhus Fremad)

=== Nordsjælland ===
In:

No.	Pos.	Nation	Player
2	DF	DEN	Peter Ankersen (from Copenhagen)
17	FW	CIV	Levy Nene (from (Ghana) Right to Dream)

Out:

No.	Pos.	Nation	Player
5	DF	DEN	Martin Frese (to (Italy) Hellas Verona)
8	FW	DEN	Andreas Schjelderup (loan return to (Portugal) Benfica)
14	FW	GHA	Ibrahim Osman (to (England) Brighton & Hove Albion)
17	FW	DEN	Christian Rasmussen (loan return to (Netherlands) Ajax)
25	GK	FIN	Carljohan Eriksson (to (Norway) Sarpsborg)
47	MF	DEN	Magnus Munck (on loan to (Belgium) RSCA Futures)
—	MF	CIV	Mohamed Diomande (to (Scotland) Rangers, previously on loan)
—	MF	CIV	Lasso Coulibaly (to (France) Auxerre, previously on loan at Randers)

=== AGF ===
In:

No.	Pos.	Nation	Player
3	DF	DEN	Henrik Dalsgaard (from Midtjylland)
18	FW	GHA	Richmond Gyamfi (from Hobro)
20	MF	DEN	Mikkel Duelund (from (Ukraine) Dynamo Kyiv, previously on loan)
22	GK	SWE	Leopold Wahlstedt (from (England) Blackburn Rovers)
24	DF	DEN	Aksel Halsgaard (from Copenhagen youth)

Out:

No.	Pos.	Nation	Player
3	DF	NED	Mats Knoester (loan return to (Hungary) Ferencváros)
13	FW	GER	Janni Serra (on loan to (Germany) 1. FC Nürnberg)
15	MF	NOR	Magnus Knudsen (loan return to (Russia) Rostov)
16	MF	DEN	Julius Beck (loan return to (Italy) Spezia)
22	MF	DEN	Benjamin Hvidt (to Esbjerg)
45	GK	NIR	Bailey Peacock-Farrell (loan return to (England) Burnley)
46	DF	AUS	Diesel Herrington (to (Australia) Central Coast Mariners)
—	FW	AUS	Jing Reec (to (Australia) Melbourne Victory, previously on loan at (Australia) Central Coast Mariners)

=== Silkeborg ===
In:

No.	Pos.	Nation	Player
2	DF	DEN	Andreas Poulsen (from AaB, previously on loan)
4	DF	POR	Pedro Ganchas (from (Portugal) Paços de Ferreira)
7	MF	KAZ	Ramazan Orazov (from (Kazakhstan) Aktobe)
8	MF	DEN	Jeppe Andersen (from (Norway) Sarpsborg 08)
10	FW	DEN	Younes Bakiz (from AaB)
33	MF	DEN	Mads Freundlich (from Hobro)

Out:

No.	Pos.	Nation	Player
4	DF	DEN	Joel Felix (to (Germany) Arminia Bielefeld)
7	MF	DEN	Kasper Kusk (to Vendsyssel)
8	MF	ISL	Stefán Teitur Þórðarson (to (England) Preston North End)
13	DF	DEN	Oscar Fuglsang (on loan to Fredericia)
15	FW	DEN	Asbjørn Bøndergaard (on loan to Fredericia)
24	DF	ZAM	Lubambo Musonda (loan return to Horsens)
29	DF	DEN	Frederik Rieper (to Fredericia)
—	FW	DEN	Frederik Carstensen (to (Norway) Sarpsborg 08, previously on loan at Fredericia)

=== Randers ===
In:

No.	Pos.	Nation	Player
1	GK	AUS	Paul Izzo (from (Australia) Melbourne Victory)
7	FW	AUS	Mohamed Toure (from (France) Reims, previously on loan at (France) Paris FC)
10	FW	JAM	Norman Campbell (from (Serbia) Vojvodina)
23	DF	DEN	Christian Østergaard (from (Germany) VfL Wolfsburg youth)
26	FW	FRA	Florian Danho (from (Switzerland) Stade Lausanne Ouchy, previously on loan at (Portugal) Famalicão)
44	DF	DEN	Nikolas Dyhr (from (United States) St. Louis City)

Out:

No.	Pos.	Nation	Player
1	GK	SWE	Patrik Carlgren (free agent)
2	DF	DEN	Jeppe Kudsk (to Fredericia)
7	DF	DEN	Mikkel Kallesøe (to Horsens)
17	MF	DEN	Mads Albæk (to (Germany) Weiche Flensburg 08)
20	FW	NGA	Mustapha Isah (on loan to (Norway) Start)
23	FW	DEN	Muamer Brajanac (to (Norway) Vålerenga)
28	MF	CIV	Lasso Coulibaly (loan return to Nordsjælland)
45	FW	AUT	Marvin Egho (to Horsens)
77	FW	GHA	Mohammed Fuseini (loan return to (Austria) Sturm Graz)

=== Viborg ===
In:

No.	Pos.	Nation	Player
15	FW	DEN	Isak Jensen (from (United States) St. Louis City, previously on loan)
16	GK	DEN	Oscar Hedvall (from Midtjylland)
17	FW	DEN	Charly Nouck (from OB)

Out:

No.	Pos.	Nation	Player
3	DF	DEN	Mads Lauritsen (retired)
9	FW	CUW	Nigel Thomas (on loan to (Portugal) Nacional)
16	GK	FIN	Lasse Schulz (loan return to (Germany) Greuther Fürth)
17	MF	DEN	Jakob Bonde (to OB)
29	FW	GHA	Malik Abubakari (loan return to (Sweden) Malmö)
58	GK	GER	Nico Mantl (loan return to (Austria) Red Bull Salzburg)
—	FW	POR	Paulinho (on loan to (Turkey) Bandırmaspor, previously on loan at (Portugal) Torreense)
—	MF	CZE	Jan Žambůrek (to (Netherlands) Heracles Almelo, previously on loan at (Czech Republic) Slovan Liberec)
—	FW	SWE	Marokhy Ndione (free agent, previously on loan at (Portugal) Feirense)

=== Vejle ===
In:

No.	Pos.	Nation	Player
14	DF	NED	Damian van Bruggen (from (Netherlands) Almere City)
18	FW	DEN	Anders K. Jacobsen (from Horsens, previously on loan)
25	DF	CRO	Luka Hujber (from (Croatia) Istra 1961)
38	DF	CRO	David Čolina (reloan from (Germany) FC Augsburg)
71	MF	JPN	Masaki Murata (from (Azerbaijan) Sumgayit)

Out:

No.	Pos.	Nation	Player
1	GK	ENG	Nathan Trott (loan return to (England) West Ham United)
2	DF	SWE	Gustav Granath (to (Sweden) Västerås)
6	DF	ESP	Raúl Albentosa (free agent)
19	FW	DEN	Victor Lind (loan return to Midtjylland)
35	MF	AUS	Tyrese Francois (loan return to (England) Fulham)
—	FW	FIN	Jasin-Amin Assehnoun (to (Greece) Volos, previously on loan)

=== Lyngby ===
In:

No.	Pos.	Nation	Player
8	MF	DEN	Mathias Hebo (from (Poland) Cracovia)
22	FW	ISL	Andri Guðjohnsen (from (Sweden) Norrköping, previously on loan)

Out:

No.	Pos.	Nation	Player
8	MF	BDI	Parfait Bizoza (to (Norway) Haugesund)
16	DF	DEN	Johan Meyer (on loan to Esbjerg)
22	FW	ISL	Andri Guðjohnsen (to (Belgium) Gent)
25	DF	DEN	Gustav Mortensen (on loan to Vendsyssel)
42	MF	DEN	Tochi Chukwuani (to (Austria) Sturm Graz)
—	DF	DEN	Mikkel Juhl Andersen (to Roskilde, previously on loan at Fredericia)
—	FW	DEN	Magnus Kaastrup (to Vendsyssel, previously on loan at (Netherlands) VVV-Venlo)

=== Sønderjyske ===
In:

No.	Pos.	Nation	Player
9	FW	CMR	Ivan Djantou (from (Albania) Skënderbeu)
11	FW	DEN	Alexander Lyng (on loan from (Switzerland) Servette)
16	GK	DEN	Jakob Busk (from (Germany) Union Berlin)
28	MF	TUR	Hamza Akman (from (Turkey) Galatasaray)
31	MF	GUI	Mohamed Cherif Haidara (from Ishøj)

Out:

No.	Pos.	Nation	Player
2	DF	DEN	Christoffer Remmer (to Frem)
8	MF	DEN	Troels Kløve (loan return to OB)
11	FW	DEN	Emil Berggreen (free agent)
15	MF	DEN	Marcus Christensen (to Roskilde)
16	DF	DEN	Jonas Thorsen (free agent)
28	GK	DEN	Jonas Dakir (to Hobro)
31	DF	DEN	Jacob Buus (free agent)
—	MF	DEN	Mads Hansen (free agent, previously on loan at Middelfart)

=== AaB ===
In:

No.	Pos.	Nation	Player
1	GK	GER	Vincent Müller (from (Germany) MSV Duisburg)
2	DF	SEN	Oumar Diakhité (from (Germany) VfL Osnabrück)
5	DF	DEN	Marc Nielsen (from Hvidovre)
6	MF	NED	Mylian Jimenez (from (Netherlands) Jong PSV)
13	DF	GER	Bjarne Pudel (from (Germany) Borussia Dortmund II)
17	MF	USA	Andres Jasson (from (United States) New York City)
19	FW	AUS	John Iredale (from (Germany) Wehen Wiesbaden)
27	FW	TAN	Kelvin John (from (Belgium) Jong Genk)

Out:

No.	Pos.	Nation	Player
1	GK	CRO	Josip Posavec (to (Croatia) Rijeka)
3	DF	DEN	Jakob Ahlmann (retired)
10	FW	DEN	Younes Bakiz (to Silkeborg)
16	MF	KEN	Richard Odada (loan return to (United States) Philadelphia Union)
17	MF	GHA	Emmanuel Toku (loan return to (Belgium) OH Leuven)
18	MF	SWE	Daniel Ask (on loan to (Sweden) Västerås)
24	DF	SWE	André Álvarez Pérez (loan return to (Sweden) Malmö)
40	GK	AUS	Max Vartuli (loan return to (Australia) Sydney FC)
—	DF	DEN	Andreas Poulsen (to Silkeborg, previously on loan)
—	FW	DEN	Marco Ramkilde (to AB, previously on loan at Hvidovre)
—	FW	SRB	Milan Makarić (to (Israel) Hapoel Tel Aviv, previously on loan at (Bosnia and Herzegovina) Borac Banja Luka)

== 1. Division ==
Note: Flags indicate national team as has been defined under FIFA eligibility rules. Players may hold more than one non-FIFA nationality.

=== OB ===
In:

No.	Pos.	Nation	Player
6	MF	DEN	Jakob Bonde (from Viborg)

Out:

No.	Pos.	Nation	Player
3	DF	DEN	Nicklas Mouritsen (to B.93)
6	MF	GER	Sven Köhler (to (Germany) Eintracht Braunschweig)
9	FW	DEN	Bashkim Kadrii (free agent)
13	GK	DEN	Hans Christian Bernat (to (Bulgaria) Botev Plovdiv)
15	MF	GER	Tom Trybull (free agent)
21	FW	DEN	Charly Nouck (to Viborg)
25	DF	SWE	Filip Helander (to (Cyprus) Omonia)
26	FW	ALB	Agon Muçolli (to Fredericia)
27	GK	DEN	Magnus Worsøe Nielsen (to Vendsyssel)
—	DF	DEN	Christian Vestergaard (to Kolding, previously on loan)
—	MF	ITA	Franco Tongya (to (Italy) Salernitana, previously on loan at (Cyprus) AEK Larnaca)
—	MF	BIH	Alen Mustafić (to (Slovakia) Slovan Bratislava, previously on loan at (Poland) Śląsk Wrocław)
—	MF	DEN	Troels Kløve (retired, previously on loan at Sønderjyske)

=== Hvidovre ===
In:

No.	Pos.	Nation	Player
9	FW	DEN	Frederik Høgh (from Aarhus Fremad)

Out:

No.	Pos.	Nation	Player
4	MF	DEN	Matti Lund Nielsen (retired)
9	FW	DEN	Tobias Thomsen (to (Portugal) Torreense)
11	MF	DEN	Thomas Jørgensen (loan return to Copenhagen youth)
13	GK	DEN	Adrian Kappenberger (to Hillerød)
19	FW	DEN	Marco Ramkilde (loan return to AaB)
26	DF	DEN	Marc Nielsen (to AaB)
—	FW	DEN	Morten Olsen (to HIK, previously on loan)

=== Kolding ===
In:

No.	Pos.	Nation	Player
2	DF	DEN	Jakob Vadstrup (from Helsingør)
4	DF	DEN	Christian Vestergaard (from OB, previously on loan)
9	FW	FIN	Momodou Sarr (from (Finland) Gnistan)
15	DF	DEN	Christian Enemark (from Næstved)
24	MF	DEN	Casper Jørgensen (from Køge)
—	GK	DEN	Jonathan Ægidius (on loan from Brøndby)

Out:

No.	Pos.	Nation	Player

=== Hobro ===
In:

No.	Pos.	Nation	Player
25	GK	DEN	Jonas Dakir (from Sønderjyske)

Out:

No.	Pos.	Nation	Player
19	FW	GHA	Richmond Gyamfi (to AGF)
33	MF	DEN	Mads Freundlich (to Silkeborg)

=== Fredericia ===
In:

No.	Pos.	Nation	Player
4	DF	DEN	Jeppe Kudsk (from Randers)
5	DF	DEN	Frederik Rieper (from Silkeborg)
15	DF	DEN	Oscar Fuglsang (on loan from Silkeborg)
16	FW	DEN	Asbjørn Bøndergaard (on loan from Silkeborg)
17	DF	ISL	Daníel Freyr Kristjánsson (on loan from Midtjylland)
20	MF	DEN	Daniel Haarbo (from Copenhagen, previously on loan at Aarhus Fremad)
90	GK	DEN	Valdemar Birksø (from Midtjylland)
98	FW	ALB	Agon Muçolli (from OB)

Out:

No.	Pos.	Nation	Player
4	DF	DEN	Mikkel Fischer (loan return to Midtjylland)
5	DF	DEN	Mikkel Juhl Andersen (loan return to Lyngby)
12	FW	DEN	Frederik Carstensen (loan return to Silkeborg)

=== Vendsyssel ===
In:

No.	Pos.	Nation	Player
1	GK	FIN	Lasse Schulz (from (Germany) Greuther Fürth, previously on loan at Viborg)
2	DF	DEN	Gustav Mortensen (on loan from Lyngby)
10	FW	DEN	Magnus Kaastrup (from Lyngby, previously on loan at (Netherlands) VVV-Venlo)
16	GK	DEN	Magnus Worsøe Nielsen (from OB)
17	MF	DEN	Kasper Kusk (from Silkeborg)

Out:

No.	Pos.	Nation	Player

=== Hillerød ===
In:

No.	Pos.	Nation	Player
1	GK	DEN	Adrian Kappenberger (from Hvidovre)

Out:

No.	Pos.	Nation	Player

=== Horsens ===
In:

No.	Pos.	Nation	Player
25	DF	DEN	Mikkel Kallesøe (from Randers)
45	FW	AUT	Marvin Egho (from Randers)

Out:

No.	Pos.	Nation	Player
—	DF	ZAM	Lubambo Musonda (to (Germany) 1. FC Magdeburg, previously on loan at Silkeborg)
—	FW	DEN	Anders K. Jacobsen (to Vejle, previously on loan)

=== B.93 ===
In:

No.	Pos.	Nation	Player
3	DF	DEN	Nicklas Mouritsen (from OB)

Out:

No.	Pos.	Nation	Player

=== Køge ===
In:

No.	Pos.	Nation	Player

Out:

No.	Pos.	Nation	Player
24	MF	DEN	Casper Jørgensen (to Kolding)

=== Esbjerg ===
In:

No.	Pos.	Nation	Player
22	MF	DEN	Benjamin Hvidt (from AGF)
25	DF	DEN	Johan Meyer (on loan from Lyngby)

Out:

No.	Pos.	Nation	Player

=== Roskilde ===
In:

No.	Pos.	Nation	Player
2	DF	DEN	Mikkel Juhl Andersen (from Lyngby, previously on loan at Fredericia)
8	MF	DEN	Marcus Christensen (from Sønderjyske)

Out:

No.	Pos.	Nation	Player

== See also ==
- 2024–25 Danish Superliga
- 2024–25 Danish 1st Division
