= Henrik Rasmussen (footballer) =

Danish footballer (born 1968)

Personal information
- Date of birth: 13 June 1968 (age 58)
- Place of birth: Løgstør, Denmark
- Height: 1.84 m (6 ft 0 in)
- Position: Midfielder

Youth career
- –1987: Løgstør IF
- 1987–1990: Nørresundby

Senior career*
Years	Team	Apps	(Gls)
1990–2002	AaB	322	(27)
- * Club domestic league appearances and goals

Henrik Rasmussen (born 13 June 1968) is a Danish former footballer who spent his entire professional career with AaB. A midfielder and set-piece specialist, he made 423 appearances and scored 34 goals for the club, winning the Danish Superliga in 1994–95 and 1998–99. He also played in four Danish Cup finals, all of which AaB lost, and represented the club in European competition, including the UEFA Champions League. Rasmussen also made one appearance for the Denmark League XI.

== Career ==
=== Early life and youth career ===
Born in Løgstør, Rasmussen began his career with local club Løgstør IF before moving to Nørresundby Boldklub. He joined AaB in 1990 together with Poul Erik Andreasen, having already established himself in senior football with Nørresundby.

=== AaB ===
Rasmussen made his first-team debut for AaB in 1990 and went on to spend the rest of his career with the club. A technically gifted midfielder, he became a central figure in the side during the 1990s and early 2000s, and was particularly noted for his set piece ability.

He was part of the AaB side that won the club's first Danish championship in the 1994–95 season, and also featured in the team that won the title again in 1998–99. In both championship-winning seasons, he played in every league match. In 1995, he also represented AaB in the group stage of the UEFA Champions League, when the club became the first Danish side to compete at that stage of the competition.

Rasmussen played in four Danish Cup finals during his time with AaB, though the club lost on each occasion. He retired at the end of 2002, having made 423 appearances and scored 34 goals for AaB, at the time the second-highest appearance total in the club's history.

== International career ==
Rasmussen made one appearance for the Denmark League XI.

== Personal life ==
After retiring from football, Rasmussen worked with vulnerable young people at a residential institution.

== Honours ==
AaB

- Danish Superliga: 1994–95, 1998–99
