= AAB =

AAB, AaB or Aab may refer to:

== Aviation ==
- Abelag Aviation in Belgium
- Air Assault Badge, a US Army military badge
- Anti-aircraft battery, a weapons system component for anti-aircraft warfare
- Arrabury Airport in Queensland, Australia (IATA airport code AAB)

== Companies and organizations ==
- Aalborg Boldspilklub, a sports club in Aalborg in Denmark
  - AaB A/S, Aalborg Boldspilklub A/S, a Danish company
- ABN AMRO, the largest bank in the Netherlands
- Aboriginal Arts Board, an historical name for part of the Australian Council for the Arts
- Adyar Ananda Bhavan, a food business in India
- Akita Asahi Broadcasting, a television station in Akita Prefecture, Japan
- Arubaanse Atletiek Bond, the governing body for the sport of athletics in Aruba
- Athletics Association of Barbados, the governing body for the sport of athletics in Barbados
- Association of Applied Biologists, a UK-based learned society promoting applied biology

== People ==
- Aab (surname)
- Alice Bailey, new age writer often referred to by her initials as AAB
- Akbar Al Baker, Qatar Airways CEO often referred to by his initials as AAB

== Other uses ==
- .aab, the filename extension for Android App Bundles
- Alumu language, a Niger–Congo language of Nigeria (ISO 639-3 code "aab")
- Acetic acid bacteria, classified under alphaproteobacteria which are used in making vinegar
- Aniline Yellow or aminoazobenzene
- Bar form, a musical form of the pattern AAB
- Antigua and Barbuda, a Caribbean country
