= Danish Football Manager of the Year =

Annual football award in Denmark

The Danish Football Manager of the Year (Danish: Årets fodboldtræner) is a yearly award presented by the Danish Football Association. The award has been presented yearly since 1968.

The award was originally presented by Spillerforeningen until 2006. Upon its inception, the award was named Award of the Year (Danish: Årets Pris) and was not limited to coaches. At that time, the award was eligible to be given to any person or group who was deemed to have benefited football in Denmark. The criteria and award name were changed in 1979 to Top Manager of the Year (Danish: Årets Top-Træner). Since 2006, the Danish Football Association and TV 2 began presenting their own award as part of the annual football awards. The award again changed format beginning in 2026, as the DBU began awarding it for the previous season. In June 2026, Jakob Poulsen received the award for the 2025–26 season.

== Winners ==
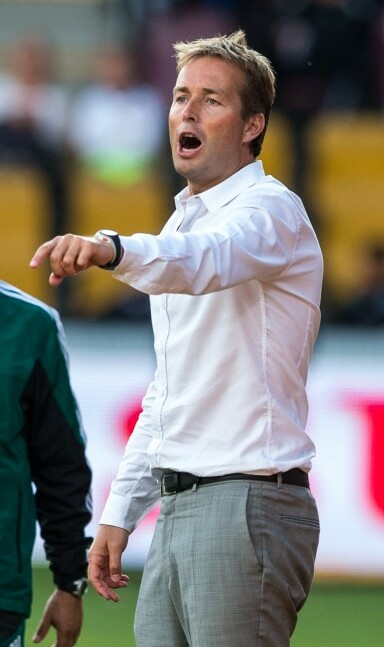
Kasper Hjulmand has won the award as manager of two different teams

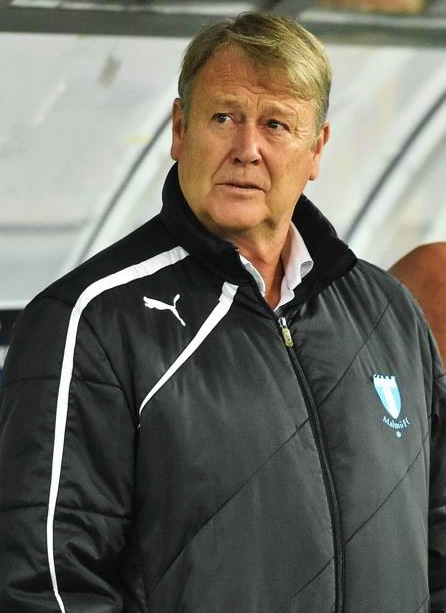
Åge Hareide won in consecutive years, 2018 and 2019

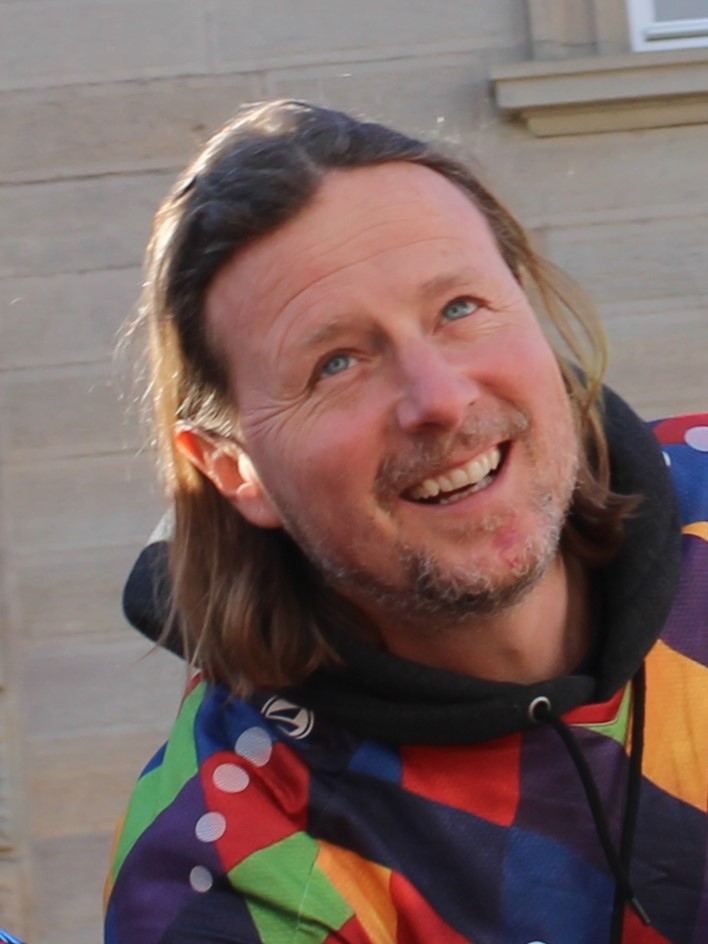
Bo Henriksen won the award for 2024

Year	Winner	Team	Ref.
1984	Poul Erik Bech	Vejle	
1987	Peter Rudbæk	AaB	
1988	Viggo Jensen	Silkeborg	
1989	Roald Poulsen	OB	
1992	Not awarded		
1993	Ebbe Skovdahl	Brøndby	
1994	Bo Johansson	Silkeborg	
1995	Poul Erik Andreasen	AaB	
1996	Peter Rudbæk	AGF	
1997	Ole Fritsen	Vejle	
1998	Benny Lennartsson	Lyngby FC	
1999	Poul Hansen	Lyngby FC	
2000	John Jensen	Herfølge Boldklub	
2001	Morten Olsen	Denmark national football team	
2002	Ove Pedersen	Midtjylland	
2003	Michael Laudrup	Brøndby	
2004	Hans Backe	Copenhagen	
2005	Michael Laudrup	Brøndby	
2006	Lars Olsen	Randers	
2007	Ståle Solbakken	Copenhagen	
2008	Erik Hamrén	AaB	
2009	Morten Olsen	Denmark national football team	
2010	Ove Christensen	Randers	
2011	Ståle Solbakken	Copenhagen	
2012	Kasper Hjulmand	Nordsjælland	
2013	Jess Thorup	Esbjerg	
2014	Kent Nielsen	AaB	
2015	Jakob Michelsen	SønderjyskE	
2016	Ståle Solbakken	Copenhagen	
2017	Kasper Hjulmand	Nordsjælland	
2018	Åge Hareide	Denmark national football team	
2019	Åge Hareide	Denmark national football team	
2020	Thomas Frank	Brentford	
2021	Kasper Hjulmand	Denmark national football team	
2022	Thomas Frank	Brentford	
2023	Jacob Neestrup	Copenhagen	
2024	Bo Henriksen	Mainz 05	
2026 (Note: Beginning in 2026, the award was handed out for the previous season, rather than calendar year. The 2026 award was given for the 2025–26 season.)	Jakob Poulsen	AGF	

== See also ==
- Danish Football Hall of Fame
- Danish Football Player of the Year
- Danish Sports Name of the Year
