= Vitalij =

Vitalij is a given name. Notable people with the name include:

- Vitalij Aab (born 1979), German ice hockey player
- Vitalij Mikhajlovich Abalakov (1906–1986), Soviet mountaineer and inventor
- Vitalij Danilchenko (born 1978), Ukrainian figure skater
- Vitalij Dubin (born 1980), former pair skater who competed for both Ukraine and Russia
- Vitalij Lazarevics Ginzburg (1916–2009), Soviet and Russian theoretical physicist, astrophysicist, Nobel laureate, etc
- Vitalij Gracev, the stage name of Vitaliy Vladasovich Grachov, a Ukrainian singer and songwriter
- Vitalij Kalojev (born 1956), architect and deputy minister of housing from Vladikavkaz, North Ossetia, Russia
- Vitalij Klyčko (born 1971), Ukrainian politician and the current mayor of Kiev
- Vitalij Korjakin (born 1983), male freestyle wrestler from Tajikistan
- Vitalij Kozlov (born 1987), Lithuanian runner who specializes in the 800 metres
- Vitalij Kuprij (born 1974), Ukrainian-American pianist, composer, music teacher and keyboardist for Ring of Fire and Trans-Siberian Orchestra
- Vitalij Margulis (1928–2011), Ukrainian classical pianist
- Vitalij Mikhajlov (born 1986), Belarusian long track speed skater
- Vitalij Rumiancev (born 1985), alpine skier from Lithuania
- Vitalij Trubila (born 1985), Belarusian football player
- Vitalij Durkin (born 1979), Russian badminton player

== See also ==
- Vitali
