= Henrik Rasmussen =

Henrik Rasmussen is the name of:

- Henrik Rasmussen (footballer), Danish footballer
- Henrik Rasmussen (politician), Danish politician
