= Torben Boye =

Danish footballer (born 1966)

Personal information
- Full name: Torben Boye
- Date of birth: 2 May 1966 (age 60)
- Place of birth: Aalborg, Denmark
- Height: 1.89 m (6 ft 2 in)
- Position: Defender

Senior career*
Years	Team	Apps	(Gls)
1983–2002	AaB Aalborg	560	(22)
- * Club domestic league appearances and goals

Torben Boye (born 2 May 1966) is a Danish former professional football (soccer) player, who played his entire career for Danish Superliga club Aalborg Boldspilklub (AaB). Boye has set a number of records for the club, including most played games, as he played 560 matches for AaB. He debuted for AaB as a midfielder in 1984, and following a couple of seasons as a right back he ended in the centre back position. He stopped at the top level following the Danish Superliga 2001-02 season.

Boye joined AaB in the Danish 3rd Division, and he saw the club rise through the ranks of Danish football, including two Danish football championships in the 1995 and 1999 seasons. On the European stage, he played 10 European games for AaB, including the UEFA Champions League 1995-96 tournament.

Torben Boye never got to represent the Denmark national football team, but he was very close. Originally a part of the Danish squad for the King Fahd Cup 1995 tournament, he had to return home before any games were played, in order to receive treatment for an apparent liver problem. The condition was quickly recovered, but his chance of national team games had passed. He did play five matches for the national league team, or national B-team, and had a club career without peers at AaB.

Following his retirement, the club stopped further use of his shirt number, number 12, in honour of his accomplishments and loyalty to the club.

== Honours ==
- Danish Superliga: 1995 and 1999

== See also ==
- One-club man
