= Marcus Bonde =

Danish footballer

Personal information
- Full name: Marcus Bonde
- Date of birth: 11 February 2007 (age 19)
- Place of birth: Hjørring, Denmark
- Position: Midfielder

Team information
- Current team: AaB
- Number: 26

Youth career
- Skibsby-Højene IF
- AaB

Senior career*
Years	Team	Apps	(Gls)
2025–	AaB	17	(0)
- * Club domestic league appearances and goals as of 2 June 2026

Marcus Bonde (born 11 February 2007) is a Danish footballer who plays as a midfielder for Danish 1st Division club AaB.

== Club career ==
=== AaB ===
Bonde transferred to AaB from Skibsby-Højene IF as a U13 player. He worked his way up through the club's academy.

In the summer of 2024, 17-year-old Bonde began gaining his first senior experience when he joined the first team's pre-season.

On 18 May 2025, Bonde got his official debut for AaB in a Danish Superliga game against Silkeborg IF, where he came onto the pitch just 25 minutes into the match as a substitute for an injured Kasper Davidsen.

Bonde also made a substitute appearance in the subsequent Superliga match—the last of the season—and in July 2025, it was announced that he had extended his contract until June 2028. He was also permanently moved up to the first-team squad ahead of the 2025–26 season, when AaB would play in the 2025-26 Danish 1st Division.

== Personal life ==
Marcus Bonde is the son of former Fortuna Hjørring player and legend, Christina Bonde.
