= Erik Hamrén =

Swedish footballer and manager

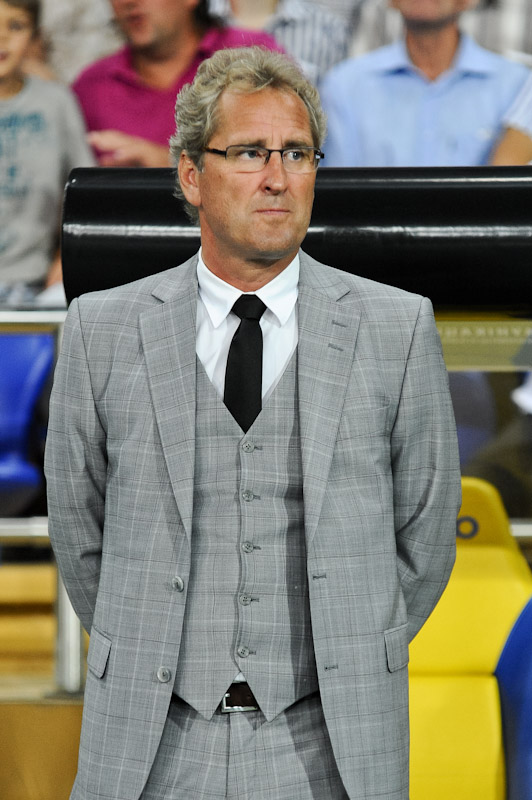
- Hamrén with Sweden in August 2011

Personal information
- Full name: Erik Anders Hamrén
- Date of birth: 27 June 1957 (age 69)
- Place of birth: Ljusdal, Sweden
- Position: Midfielder

Managerial career
- Years: Team
- 1987–1988: Enköpings SK
- 1989: Väsby IK
- 1990–1991: IF Brommapojkarna
- 1992–1993: Vasalunds IF
- 1994: Degerfors IF
- 1995–1997: AIK
- 1998–2003: Örgryte IS
- 2004–2008: AaB
- 2008–2010: Rosenborg BK
- 2009–2016: Sweden
- 2018–2020: Iceland
- 2022–2023: AaB

Erik Anders Hamrén (born 27 June 1957) is a Swedish manager and former football player, who most recently was the manager of Danish Superliga club AaB. He also previously coached the Sweden national team between 2009 and 2016 and the Iceland national football team from 2018 to 2020.

== Playing career ==
Hamrén played in local team Ljusdals IF before starting his coaching career. An injury ended his playing career.

== Coaching career ==
Hamrén coached Norwegian team Rosenborg BK to league championship in his first full season with the club. His previous job was as manager of the Danish Superliga side Aalborg BK, where he guided the team to a 5th-place finish in the 2005–06 season, a 3rd place in the 2006–07 season, and to the championship in the 2007–08 season.

Following heavy speculation in Swedish and Norwegian media, it was confirmed on 4 November 2009 that Hamrén would assume part-time responsibility of the Sweden national football team while also managing Rosenborg. This happened until Rosenborg relieved him from his contract on 1 September 2010. From that point, Hamrén would assume full-time responsibilities for the Swedish team. After heavy discussions with RBK (Erik Hoftun, Terje Svendsen, Nils Skutle, Lars Aune), Hamren eventually was confirmed as manager for the Sweden national team.

On 16 October 2012, he presided over a game where the national team finished with a 4–4 draw from 4–0 down in Berlin against Germany in 2014 FIFA World Cup qualification – UEFA Group C. Hamrén qualified Sweden for Euro 2012 and Euro 2016, before stepping down as the manager of Sweden.

On 8 August 2018, Hamrén was named as manager of the Iceland national football team, where he succeeded Heimir Hallgrímsson. On 15 November 2020, following Iceland's failure to qualify for Euro 2020 and their poor performance in the 2020–21 UEFA Nations League A that led to their relegation for the succeeding season, Hamren announced that he would resign as manager after Iceland's last match of the year.

On 15 September 2022 he returned to AaB in the Danish Superliga, when Lars Friis was sacked. On 20 March 2023, Hamrén was sacked after a poor run of results with AaB in last place in the Superliga.

== Personal life ==
Erik Hamrén was raised primarily in Ljusdal as the son of Pelle, a train dispatcher, and his wife Kerstin. He is married and has two daughters.

== Honours ==
=== As manager ===
AIK

- Svenska Cupen: 1995–1996, 1996-1997

Örgryte IS

- Svenska Cupen: 1999–2000

AaB Fodbold

- Danish Superliga Championship: 2007–08

Rosenborg

- Tippeligaen: 2009, 2010
- Superfinalen: 2010

Individual

- Danish Football Manager of the Year: 2008
- Norwegian Football Manager of the Year: 2009

=== As technical director ===
Mamelodi Sundowns

- Nedbank Cup: 2018

== Managerial statistics ==
As of 19 March 2023

Team	Nat.	From	To	Record				
Team	Nat.	From	To	G	W	D	L	Win %
Örgryte IS	(Sweden)	January 1998	December 2003	168	76	40	52	45.24
AaB	(Denmark)	January 2004	May 2008	84	58	8	18	69.05
Rosenborg	(Norway)	June 2008	May 2010	77	43	23	11	55.84
Sweden	(Sweden)	November 2009	June 2016	86	46	17	23	53.49
Iceland	(Iceland)	August 2018	November 2020	28	9	5	14	32.14
AaB	(Denmark)	September 2022	March 2023	15	4	3	8	26.67
Career totals				458	236	96	126	51.53
