= Peter Rudbæk =

Danish football manager (born 1955)

Personal information
- Date of birth: 5 February 1955 (age 71)

Managerial career
- Years: Team
- 1976–1979: Nørresundby (youth)
- 1980–1982: AaB (youth)
- 1983–1989: AaB
- 1990–1993: Viborg
- 1993–2000: AGF
- 2000–2002: AaB

Peter Rudbæk (born 5 February 1955) is a Danish football manager.

Rudbæk managed AaB from 1983 to 1989, Viborg FF from 1990 to 1993, AGF from 1993 to 2000 and AaB again from 2000 to 2002. From 2005 to 2020 he worked as a head of coach development in the Danish Football Union. He received the Danish Football Manager of the Year award in 1987 and 1996. The latter came after winning the 1995-96 Danish Cup with AGF.

He was sacked by AGF in 2000, though he recorded the best point-per-game score in AGF's modern history with 1.28. He was however surpassed by his two immediate successor, acting manager Kent Nielsen (1.36 PPG) as well as Peter Sørensen (1.32 PPG).

Joining AaB for a second stint as manager in 2000, he was relieved of the job after a fourth place in the 2001-02 Danish Superliga, since the AaB directors "were uncertain about whether Rudbæk would be able to live up to Aalborg's ambitions for the future".

Rudbæk immediately went on to Danish radio where was an expert commentator during the 2002 FIFA World Cup.
