= Aab (surname) =

Family name

Aab is a surname. Notable people with the surname include:

- Jaak Aab (born 1960), Estonian politician
- Vitalij Aab (born 1979), German ice hockey player
