= Poul Erik Andreasen =

Danish footballer and manager (born 1949)

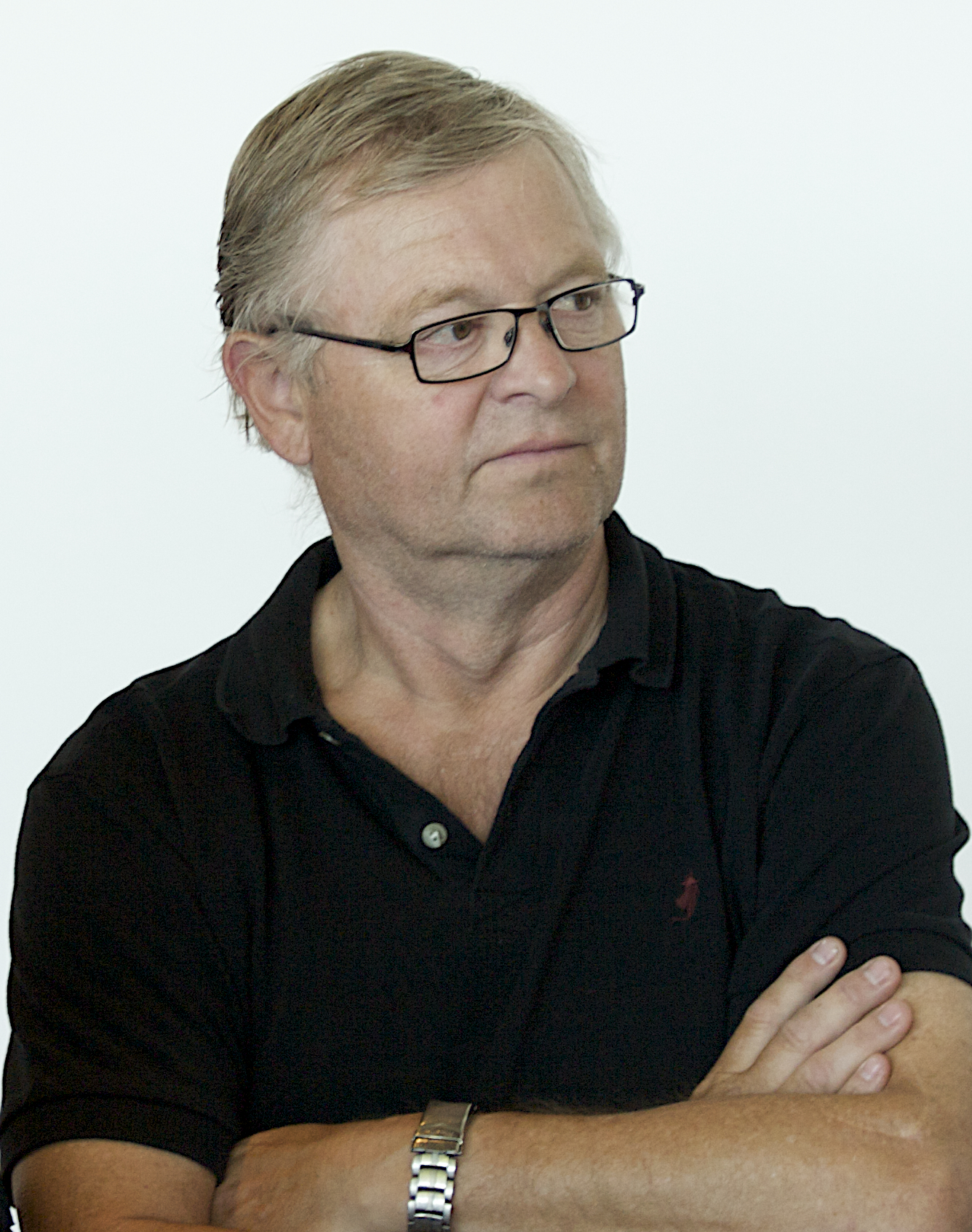

Personal information
- Date of birth: 17 December 1949 (age 76)
- Place of birth: Denmark
- Position: Striker

Senior career*
Years	Team	Apps	(Gls)
–1972	Nørresundby Boldklub		
1972–1973	B1903		
1973–1978	Aalborg BK		

International career
1973	Denmark U-21	2	(1)

Managerial career
- 1979–1982: Nibe
- 1983–1984: Aalborg BK
- 1985–1988: Nørresundby Boldklub
- 1989: Lindholm
- 1990–1995: Aalborg BK
- 1996–1999: Viking
- 2000–2001: Vejle BK
- 2001–2019: Aalborg BK (Development manager)
- 2002–2003: Aalborg BK
- 2008: Aalborg BK (assistant)
- * Club domestic league appearances and goals

Poul Erik Andreasen (born 17 December 1949) is a Danish ex-football (soccer) player and manager, who managed the Danish Superliga side Aalborg BK (AaB) during their 1994-95 Superliga victory. In 1996-1999 he coached Norwegian Viking FK from Stavanger. He is currently a youth coach at AaB. In his active career, he played more than 100 games for AaB between 1973 and 1978.
