= Marc Nielsen =

Danish footballer (born 2001)

Personal information
- Full name: Marc Langskov Nielsen
- Date of birth: 16 May 2001 (age 25)
- Place of birth: Rønne, Denmark
- Position: Left-back

Team information
- Current team: AaB
- Number: 5

Youth career
- Rønne IK
- Hvidovre

Senior career*
Years	Team	Apps	(Gls)
2021–2024	Hvidovre	80	(0)
2024–	AaB	39	(3)
- * Club domestic league appearances and goals as of 2 June 2026

Marc Langskov Nielsen (born 16 May 2001) is a Danish professional footballer who plays as a left-back for Danish 1st Division club AaB.

== Career ==
Born in Rønne on the Danish island of Bornholm in the Baltic Sea, Nielsen started his career at local club Rønne Idrætsklub, before later moving to Copenhagen in Zealand, where he became a part of Hvidovre IF's youth sector.

Nielsen started on the club's U-19 team and then became part of the club's U-23 team. On 7 October 2020, Nielsen made his debut for Hvidovre's first team, playing all 90 minutes in a cup match against KFUMs Boldklub København. Later that month, on 30 October 2020, Nielsen also made his league debut for Hvidovre in a match against Kolding IF. Nielsen then played in nine matches before signing his first contract with Hvidovre on 26 May 2021. His good form also attracted interest in the summer window, but Hvidovre did not want to sell the young left-back.

In the following two seasons, Nielsen was a regular at left-back. With 21 appearances in the 2022–23 season, Nielsen played an important role in Hvidovre's promotion to the 2023–24 Danish Superliga. Nielsen made his debut in the top Danish league on 21 July 2023, against FC Midtjylland.

=== AaB ===
On July 9, 2024, newly promoted Danish Superliga side AaB confirmed that they had bought Nielsen free in Hvidovre, but only from January 2025. Nielsen signed a deal until June 30, 2028.

Since Hvidovre switched to a full-time setup from the summer of 2024, all players had to play on full-time contracts. Because Nielsen had signed with AaB from January 2025, he could not go on a full-time contract, so Nielsen could not train with the team. The reason was that part-time professionals were not allowed to train in the morning, as Hvidovre had switched to doing. The situation was resolved by AaB buying Nielsen out on July 20, 2024, and Nielsen moved to the club from Aalborg with immediate effect.
