= AaB A/S =

Danish sports corporation

Aalborg Boldspilklub A/S
- Company type: Public
- Traded as: Nasdaq Copenhagen: AaB; LSE: 0JIT
- Founded: 1 July 1987
- Headquarters: Aalborg, Denmark
- Key people: Lynge Jacobsen; Finn V. Nielsen
- Products: Sports, conference, education, sportswear
- Revenue: 251,853,000 DKK (2008)
- Net income: 31,081,000 DKK (2008)
- Number of employees: 129 (2008)
- Website: http://www.aabsport.dk/

Aalborg Boldspilklub A/S (also AaB A/S) is a Danish sports corporation based in Aalborg Denmark. Founded on 1 July 1987, AaB A/S is most noted for ownership of the professional football (soccer) team AaB Fodbold. Other holdings has until included professional handball and hockey teams, a retail sports chain, a conference and sports center and a sports college but all of these activities has been closed or sold off due to financial problems. The company's stock is traded on the Copenhagen Stock Exchange as AaB.

== Management ==
AaB A/S is headed by director Lynge Jacobsen and seven board members, with Finn V. Nielsen as chairman of the board. Each department has its own division director.

== Shareholders ==
At 31 December 2008 Aalborg Boldspilklub A/S had about 9,600 shareholders. Two companies owned more than 5%. They are Nordjyske Holding A/S with 19.8% and Sebc Holding ApS with 5.3%.
