= Jonas Dakir =

Danish footballer (born 1997)

Personal information
- Full name: Jonas Dakir
- Date of birth: 18 April 1997 (age 29)
- Place of birth: Aarhus, Denmark
- Height: 1.91 m (6 ft 3 in)
- Position: Goalkeeper

Team information
- Current team: Hobro
- Number: 25

Youth career
- Viby IF
- Midtjylland
- Randers

Senior career*
Years	Team	Apps	(Gls)
2016–2022	Randers	5	(0)
2022–2023	Hillerød	28	(0)
2023–2024	SønderjyskE	0	(0)
2024–	Hobro	58	(0)
- * Club domestic league appearances and goals as of 2 June 2026

Jonas Dakir (born 18 April 1997) is a Danish footballer who plays as a goalkeeper for Hobro IK in the Danish 1st Division.

== Club career ==
=== Randers FC ===
Dakir joined Randers FC after being discarded from FC Midtjylland as a U16 player. He sat on the bench for the first team of Randers three times in the 2016–17 season and at the end of the season, he signed his first professional contract with the club, becoming the third choice on the goalkeeper post on the first team. He got his debut for the first team on 26 August 2017 in the Danish Cup. Dakir played two more games in that season, both in the Danish Cup as well.

In February 2018 Randers announced, that they had extended Dakir's contract from the summer 2018, where he would become a full-time professional player.

Randers sold Frederik Due in the beginning of 2019 and with his departure, Dakir became the second choice. On 27 October 2019, Dakir got his debut in the Danish Superliga against Lyngby Boldklub. Dakir came on the pitch in the 59th minute after first choice Patrik Carlgren was sent off. Two weeks later, he signed a contract extension until June 2022. He left the club at the end of the 2021–22 season.

=== Danish 1st Division clubs ===
On 1 August 2022, Dakir joined newly promoted Danish 1st Division club Hillerød. After a season at Hillerød, Dakir signed with SønderjyskE on 31 May 2023 ahead of the 2023–24 season, binding him to the club for three years.

On July 25, 2024 Hobro IK confirmed that Dakir joined the club on a deal until June 2027.

== Personal life ==
Born in Denmark, Dakir is of Moroccan descent.

== Honours ==
Randers

- Danish Cup: 2020–21
