= Gustav Mortensen =

Danish footballer (born 2004)

Personal information
- Full name: Gustav Julius Mortensen
- Date of birth: 19 March 2004 (age 22)
- Place of birth: Denmark
- Position: Left-back

Team information
- Current team: Standard Liège
- Number: 3

Youth career
- 2009–2011: Nivå-Kokkedal
- 2011–2021: Lyngby

Senior career*
Years	Team	Apps	(Gls)
2021–2026	Lyngby	23	(2)
2024–2025	→ Vendsyssel (loan)	29	(1)
2026–	Standard Liège	22	(0)

International career^{‡}
2019–2020	Denmark U16	10	(1)
2020	Denmark U17	1	(0)
2021–2022	Denmark U18	6	(1)
2021–2023	Denmark U19	12	(0)
2023–2024	Denmark U20	12	(0)
2025–	Denmark U21	5	(0)
- * Club domestic league appearances and goals as of 31 May 2026 ‡ National team caps and goals as of 22 September 2026

Gustav Julius Mortensen (born 19 March 2004) is a Danish footballer who plays as a left-back for Belgian Pro League club Standard Liège.

== Career ==
=== Lyngby BK ===
Mortensen started playing football at Nivå-Kokkedal FK in Nivå and joined Lyngby Boldklub in 2011. He is a product of Lyngby's youth sector and fought his way up through the youth ranks. On 20 May 2021, Mortensen became the youngest debutant in the history of Lyngby - at the age of 17 years, 2 months and 1 day - when he came off the bench in a Danish Superliga game against OB on 20 May 2021. This was his only first team appearance in that season. In the upcoming 2021–22 season, where Lyngby played in the Danish 1st Division, Mortensen only made two appearances: both in the Danish Cup.

In August 2022, Mortensen signed a new contract until June 2025. Mortensen made a total of four appearances for Lyngby in the 2022–23 season.

After just five appearances (29 minutes in the league and 67 minutes in the cup), Lyngby confirmed on 20 June 2024 that Mortensen would be on loan to Danish 1st Division club Vendsyssel FF for the coming season. On 19 July 2024 he made his debut when he was in the starting lineup in the league match against FC Roskilde.

On 8 September 2024, Lyngby confirmed that Mortensen - who was on loan to Vendsyssel at the time - had signed a 1-year contract extension, so his deal now expired in June 2027. After a season that ended in relegation for Vendsyssel, it was confirmed that Mortensen would return to Lyngby following the conclusion of his loan spell.

=== Standard Liège ===
On 15 January 2026, Mortensen joined Belgian Pro League club Standard Liège on a deal until June 2030.
