= Vitalij Aab =

German ice hockey player (born 1979)

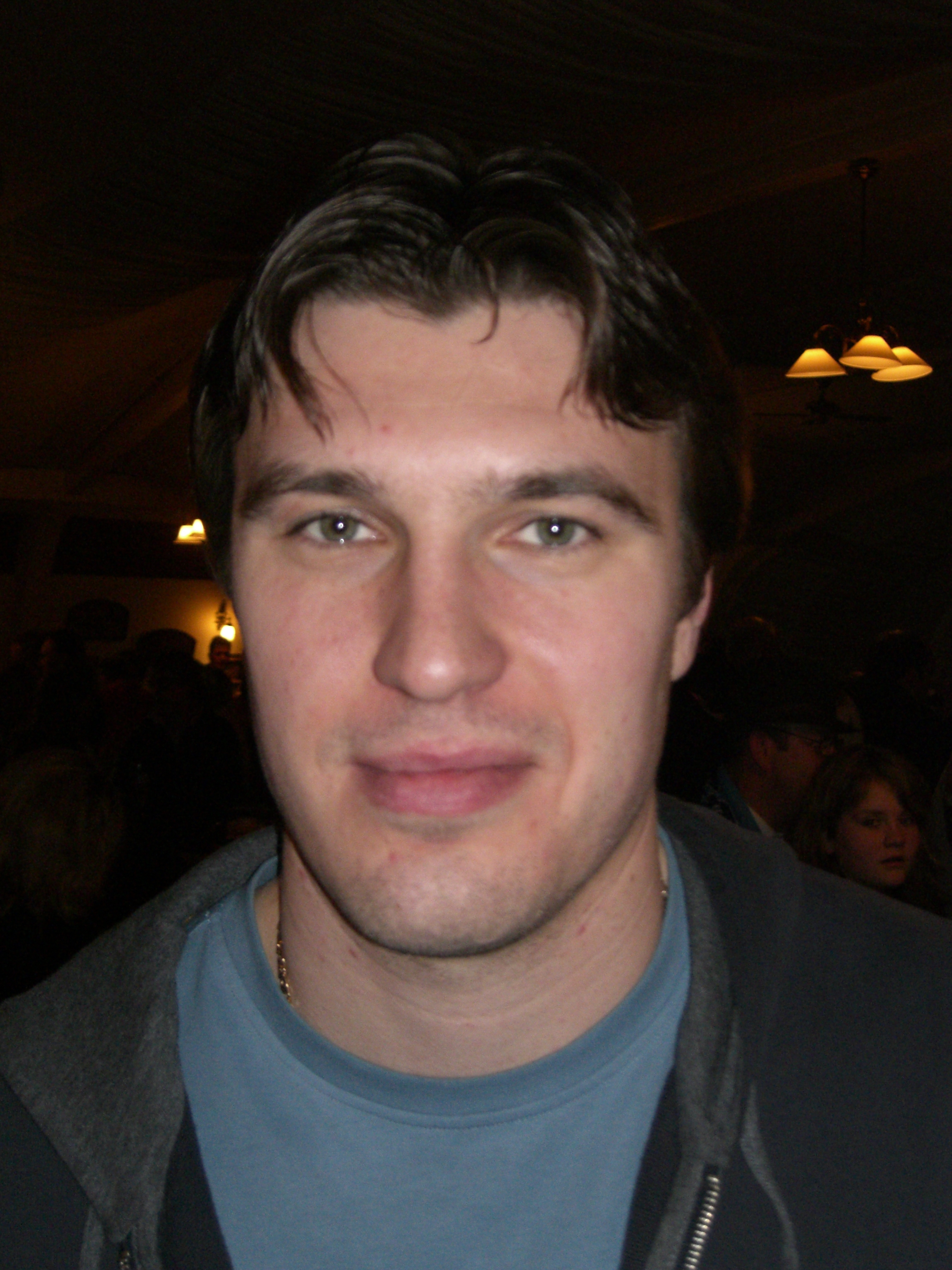
- Born: November 14, 1979 (age 46) Karaganda, Kazakh SSR, Soviet Union
- Height: 6 ft 2 in (188 cm)
- Weight: 198 lb (90 kg; 14 st 2 lb)
- Position: Wing
- Shoots: Right
- Oberliga team Former teams: Höchstadter EC; Nürnberg Ice Tigers; Adler Mannheim; Iserlohn Roosters; Hamburg Freezers
- National team: Germany
- Playing career: 1997–present

Vitalij Aab (born November 14, 1979) is a German ice hockey player who is currently playing for Höchstadter EC in the German Oberliga.

== Playing career ==
Vitalij Aab's professional debut was at the age of 17 for EC Wilhelmshaven. In his second season, he scored 28 points. In 1999, he was promoted into the second division with Wilhelmshaven. Two years later, he transferred to the Nürnberg Ice Tigers, where he played for three years. During this time he played so well that the German national coach called him up to play for the German national ice hockey team. Aab had the worst season of his career in 2004–05 with the Adler Mannheim; he only scored 24 points in 48 games, and therefore received very little ice time at the end of the season.

He left Mannheim after only one season and switched to the Iserlohn Roosters. After struggling at first, Aab's performance improved dramatically. At the end of the season, he was the highest scorer in Germany. Before the 2006–07 season, he signed with the Hamburg Freezers.

Aab returned to the Ice Tigers, now known at that time as the Thomas Sabo Ice Tigers, in 2010.

== Career statistics ==
=== Regular season and playoffs ===
			Regular season					Playoffs
Season	Team	League	GP	G	A	Pts	PIM	GP	G	A	Pts	PIM
1997–98	EC Wilhelmshaven	2.GBun	54	16	12	28	6	—	—	—	—	—
1998–99	EC Wilhelmshaven	3.GBun	36	16	18	34	26	—	—	—	—	—
1999–00	EC Wilhelmshaven	2.GBun	40	10	5	15	71	—	—	—	—	—
2000–01	EC Wilhelmshaven	2.GBun	49	20	14	34	20	—	—	—	—	—
2001–02	Nürnberg Ice Tigers	DEL	58	13	20	33	8	4	0	0	0	0
2002–03	Nürnberg Ice Tigers	DEL	52	18	10	28	24	5	1	0	1	0
2003–04	Nürnberg Ice Tigers	DEL	51	11	12	23	24	6	1	3	4	2
2004–05	Adler Mannheim	DEL	48	11	13	24	12	10	0	0	0	2
2005–06	Iserlohn Roosters	DEL	52	16	17	33	12	—	—	—	—	—
2006–07	Hamburg Freezers	DEL	52	11	17	28	32	7	0	4	4	0
2007–08	Hamburg Freezers	DEL	56	14	18	32	46	8	4	2	6	4
2008–09	Hamburg Freezers	DEL	34	15	17	32	22	9	3	4	7	6
2009–10	Hamburg Freezers	DEL	55	11	18	29	30	—	—	—	—	—
2010–11	Thomas Sabo Ice Tigers	DEL	51	13	18	31	12	2	0	0	0	0
2011–12	Thomas Sabo Ice Tigers	DEL	48	12	15	27	41	—	—	—	—	—
2012–13	Thomas Sabo Ice Tigers	DEL	27	1	0	1	10	—	—	—	—	—
DEL totals			584	146	175	321	273	51	9	13	22	14
