= AaB Fodbold =

Danish football club

Coordinates: 57°2′37″N 10°1′15″E

AaB
- Full name: Aalborg Boldspilklub af 1885
- Nicknames: De Røde (The Reds); De Bolchestribede (The Candy-Cane Striped)
- Short name: AaB
- Founded: 13 May 1885; 141 years ago
- Ground: Aalborg Portland Park
- Capacity: 13,800 (7,700 seated)
- Owner: AaB A/S
- Sports director: John Møller
- Head coach: Steffen Højer
- League: Danish 1st Division
- 2025–26: Danish 1st Division, 7th of 12
- Website: aabsport.dk
| Home colours | Away colours | Third colours |

AaB, (full name: Aalborg Boldspilklub, pronounced [ˈʌlˌpɒˀ ˈpʌlˀtspe̝lˌkʰlup]) internationally referred to commonly as Aalborg BK, and occasionally referred to as AaB Aalborg, is a professional football club based in Aalborg, Denmark. The club currently competes in the Danish 1st Division, the second tier of Danish football. AaB is one of the oldest and most historically significant clubs in Danish football, having been founded on 13 May 1885. Initially formed as a cricket club by English railway engineers, the club adopted football in 1902 and has competed under the name Aalborg Boldspilklub af 1885 since 1906.

AaB has traditionally been a mainstay in the Danish top flight, and has won the Danish Superliga four times, in 1994–95, 1998–99, 2007–08, and 2013–14. The latter season remains the club's most successful, as AaB won the domestic double by securing both the league title and the Danish Cup. In total, the club has lifted the national cup three times. After a period of decline in the early 2020s, AaB was relegated from the top tier at the end of the 2022–23 season for the first time in 36 years. The club secured immediate promotion in 2023–24 but was relegated again the following season, returning to the Danish 1st Division for the 2025–26 campaign.

On the European stage, AaB holds the distinction of being the first Danish club to reach the group stage of the UEFA Champions League, doing so in 1995–96 after replacing Dynamo Kyiv, who were expelled for disciplinary reasons. The club later qualified directly for the group stage in 2008–09, and remains one of Denmark's most frequent participants in the competition, second only to F.C. Copenhagen in appearances.

== History ==
AaB was founded on 13 May 1885 by English engineers who were building Jutland's railway system, and the first years was concentrated on the game of cricket. It was initially named Aalborg Cricketklub (Aalborg Cricket club) but the name of the club was changed to Aalborg Boldklub (Aalborg ballclub) in 1899. Football was adopted on an amateur basis in 1902, and has since been the main sport, as the name was changed to the current Aalborg Boldspilklub af 1885 (Aalborg ballgameclub of 1885) in 1906.

Aalborg BK was part of the top-flight Danish leagues from the 1928–29 season, until the relegation of the club in 1947. The club returned to the best league in 1963, and except from the years of 1972, 1978 and 1981–1986, Aalborg BK has since been a part of the various editions of the Danish football championship. Despite its many years in the Danish championship, the club never won a championship title, but Aalborg BK won the Danish Cup competition in 1966 and 1970. Paid football was introduced in Denmark by the Danish Football Association in 1978. As Aalborg BK returned to the best Danish league, the club founded the professional branch of AaB A/S in 1987 to run a professional football team.

During the 1990s, AaB emerged as one of Denmark's leading clubs, winning its first two national championships. In the 1994–95 season, under head coach Poul Erik Andreasen, the team secured the league title with forward Erik Bo Andersen finishing as the division's top scorer with 24 goals. Although the club was initially eliminated by Dynamo Kyiv in the qualifying rounds of the 1995–96 UEFA Champions League, Dynamo were later expelled from the tournament due to a match-fixing scandal. As a result, AaB were reinstated and became the first Danish club to participate in the group stage of the Champions League. Competing in Group A, AaB earned a 2–1 home victory over Panathinaikos and drew 2–2 with Porto, but were eliminated after finishing third in the group. Following the campaign, Andersen transferred to Rangers in Scotland. His departure was offset by the emergence of Søren Frederiksen, who scored 17 goals in the 1998–99 season as AaB claimed their second league title, this time under Swedish manager Hans Backe. That season also saw AaB return to Champions League qualification, where they were again drawn against Dynamo Kyiv. The Danish side lost the home leg 2–1 and drew 2–2 in Ukraine, with a late AaB goal controversially ruled not to have crossed the line, resulting in another early exit from the competition.

Following their domestic title in 1998–99, AaB established themselves as a stable presence in the upper half of the Danish Superliga. The club secured a third-place finish in the 2006–07 season, earning qualification for the 2007 UEFA Intertoto Cup. In the Intertoto Cup, AaB progressed past Finnish side FC Honka, advancing on the away goals rule after a 2–2 draw in the away leg and a 1–1 draw in Aalborg. In the third and final round, they faced Belgian club Gent, drawing 1–1 away and winning 2–1 at home to secure a place in the second qualifying round of the 2007–08 UEFA Cup. In the UEFA Cup qualifiers, AaB were drawn against Finnish champions HJK Helsinki. After a 2–1 defeat in the first leg in Helsinki, AaB responded with a 3–0 victory in the return leg at home, advancing to the first round proper. There, they were paired with Italian side Sampdoria, who featured high-profile players such as Antonio Cassano and Vincenzo Montella. Despite the challenge, AaB advanced on away goals, drawing 2–2 in Genoa and holding Sampdoria to a 0–0 draw in Aalborg—becoming the first Danish club to eliminate an Italian team from European competition. In the group stage, AaB were seeded in the lowest pot and drawn into a challenging group alongside Anderlecht, Tottenham Hotspur, Getafe, and Hapoel Tel Aviv. They opened with a home draw against Anderlecht, followed by a narrow 3–2 defeat to Tottenham Hotspur in London after having led 2–0 at half-time. A subsequent 2–1 home loss to Getafe left AaB unable to progress to the knockout stage.

In the 2007–08 season, Aalborg won their third Danish Championship and qualified for the 2008–09 UEFA Champions League qualifying rounds. in the second qualifying round, Aalborg easily eliminated FK Modriča 7–1 on aggregate. In the third round, before the group stage, they defeated FBK Kaunas 2–0 both at home and away and reached the group stage of the Champions League for the second time, the first time a Danish team achieved this. In the group stage, they were drawn in Group E along with defending champions Manchester United, Villarreal and Celtic. Aalborg finished third in the group, ahead of Celtic, with 6 points and progressed to the 2008–09 UEFA Cup knockout stage.

Their first match in their UEFA Cup run was against Spanish side Deportivo de La Coruña. Aalborg BK won the first leg at home 3–0 and the second leg at the Estadio Riazor 1–3, securing a 6–1 aggregate. Aalborg BK thereby earned a place among the last 16 teams. where they faced Manchester City. After a 2–0 loss in Manchester in the first leg Aalborg BK fought back to tie the score with a 2–0 win at home. The tie ended in agony however, as Aalborg were defeated by 4–3 on penalties.

On 11 May 2014, the club won their 4th Danish Championship, and four days later the double was secured, as the club defeated F.C. Copenhagen 4–2 in the Cup final.

On 3 June 2023, AaB suffered relegation to Danish 1st Division for the first time since 1986 and the first after the establishment of the Danish Superliga in 1991, due to finishing in last place.

== Ownership ==
The German sports consultancy and football investment group BPTC Sports became associated with AaB through the investor group SSE22, which acquired a significant stake in the club in 2023 and later became majority owners. In July 2024, Jan Peters of BPTC Sports became chairman of the club.

During the ownership period, AaB was relegated from the Danish Superliga in 2023, promoted in 2024, and relegated again in 2025. During the 2025–26 season, the club failed to qualify for the promotion play-offs in the Danish 1st Division.

The ownership period was marked by financial challenges, organisational changes and sustained criticism from supporters, sponsors and local stakeholders. Danish media covered recurring protests against SSE22 and BPTC Sports, including criticism from Aalborg's mayor.

In June 2025, Jan Peters resigned as chairman, and SSE22 withdrew from the club's day-to-day management while remaining majority owners. In March 2026, SSE22 changed its name to Nordic Football Group.

In April 2026, an investment group led by BPTC Sports acquired a minority stake in the Dutch football club VVV-Venlo, with plans to become majority owners pending regulatory approval.

In July 2026, AaB supporter group Unitas Norde announced that it would boycott the club for as long as it remained under BPTC Sports ownership, citing, among other things, concerns over the group's multi-club ownership model.

== Stadium ==
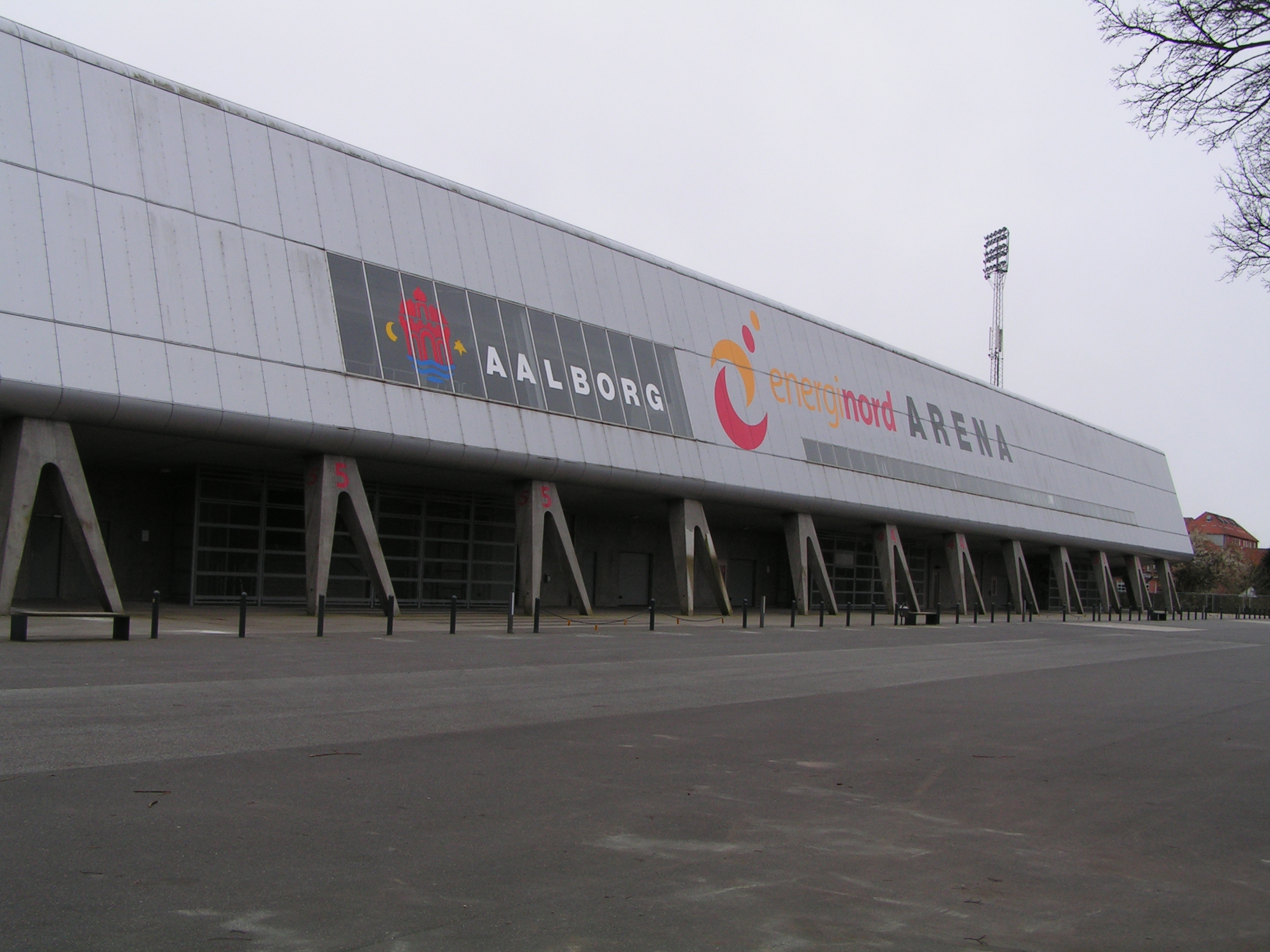
The northern facade of Nordjyske Arena, 2008

Since 1920, Aalborg BK has played its games at Aalborg Stadion. The stadium was opened on 18 July 1920 with a north–south aligned playing field. The first spectator seats were built in 1927, and in 1937 a wooden terrace for 3,000 standing spectators was built. In 1960, the stadium burned down and a new east-western aligned concrete stadium was opened in 1962. In recent years the stadium has been enlarged and rebuilt so that it now has modern facilities and roof over all spectator stands. The stadium currently has a capacity of 13,997 people (8,997 seats) or 10,500 people (all seats).

== Supporters and rivalries ==
Aalborg BK's official fanclub is AaB Support Club. Formed in 1990, it is one of the oldest fanclubs in Denmark. Aalborg BK's fan-culture is thriving, with both official and unofficial groups like Auxilia Ultras, AaB Tifo Kaos and Generationen offering fanatical support at all games home and away. All fan groups for Aalborg BK, both official and unofficial also work together under the name "Vesttribunen" (The Western-Stand), in reference to the tribune where the active fans stand. Some Ultras of Aalborg BK have a friendship with those of Hammarby IF, SK Brann and AZ Alkmaar.

AaB's traditional rivals are AGF with whom they contest "Den Jyske Klassiker" (The Jutland Classic), a match between the two largest cities and most popular clubs in Jylland. The rivalry was most prominent in the 70's, 80's and 90's and has since declined in tension due to both clubs starting to see FC Copenhagen and Brøndby IF as greater rivals. The creation of Randers FC also saw a new local-rivalry for AGF which eased the tension with AaB as AGF developed a new and very intense rivalry with Randers FC. The Jutland Classic is however still considered one of the biggest games in Danish football, and the history and rivalry between the two clubs shows on matchday with massive crowds, bold chanting and fanatical support between both sets of fans. The fans of both clubs still considers it one of the biggest and most important games of the season.

== Players ==
=== Current squad ===
As of 3 September 2026

Note: Flags indicate national team as defined under FIFA eligibility rules; some limited exceptions apply. Players may hold more than one non-FIFA nationality.

| No. | Pos. | Nation | Player |
|---|---|---|---|
| 1 | GK | GER | Vincent Müller |
| 2 | DF | DEN | Mikkel Kallesøe |
| 4 | DF | DEN | Benjamin Tiedemann |
| 5 | DF | DEN | Marc Nielsen |
| 7 | FW | ENG | Jubril Adedeji |
| 8 | MF | NOR | Alexander Håpnes |
| 9 | FW | DEN | Nicklas Helenius |
| 11 | FW | NOR | Kornelius Normann |
| 13 | DF | GER | Bjarne Pudel |
| 14 | FW | DEN | Mathias Kubel |
| 15 | DF | DEN | Cornelius Olsson |
| 16 | DF | BEL | Tibo Persyn |
| 17 | MF | USA | Andres Jasson |
| 18 | MF | NED | Mathijs Tielemans |

| No. | Pos. | Nation | Player |
|---|---|---|---|
| 19 | FW | JPN | Brian Nwadike |
| 21 | DF | DEN | Philip Søndergaard |
| 22 | GK | NED | Rody de Boer |
| 23 | MF | NOR | Markus Kaasa |
| 24 | DF | ISL | Nóel Atli Arnórsson |
| 25 | MF | DEN | Frederik Børsting |
| 26 | MF | DEN | Marcus Bonde |
| 27 | FW | TAN | Kelvin John |
| 28 | MF | DEN | Valdemar Møller |
| 30 | FW | DEN | William Thomsen |
| 33 | DF | SWE | Elison Makolli |
| 39 | FW | DEN | Bertram Skovgaard |
| 40 | GK | DEN | Bertil Grønkjær |

=== Youth players in use 2026-27 ===
Note: Flags indicate national team as defined under FIFA eligibility rules; some limited exceptions apply. Players may hold more than one non-FIFA nationality.

| No. | Pos. | Nation | Player |

=== Out on loan ===
Note: Flags indicate national team as defined under FIFA eligibility rules; some limited exceptions apply. Players may hold more than one non-FIFA nationality.

| No. | Pos. | Nation | Player |
|---|---|---|---|
| — | DF | MDA | Christian Tcacenco (at Skive IK until 1 July 2027) |

=== Retired numbers ===
12 – (Denmark) Torben Boye, defender (1984–2001)

== Current management ==
| Position | Staff |
|---|---|
| Sports director | (Denmark) John Møller (2025–) |
| Head coach | (Denmark) Steffen Højer (2025–) |
| Assistant coach | (Denmark) Bo Zinck (2025–) |
| Goalkeeping coach | (Denmark) Poul Buus (2007–) |
| Head of Performance | (Germany) Pierre Gillo (2024–) |

AaB Fodbold is owned by AaB A/S.

== Head coaches ==
- (Finland) Kaarlo Niilonen (1960–70)

The following managers have coached AaB since it re-entered the Danish top-flight in 1986:

- (Denmark) Peter Rudbæk (1983–89)
- (Denmark) Poul Erik Andreasen (1 July 1990–95)
- (Germany) Sepp Piontek (1 July 1995–96)
- (Denmark) Per Westergaard (1996–97)
- (Denmark) Lars Søndergaard (1997)
- (Sweden) Hans Backe (1998–00)
- (Denmark) Peter Rudbæk (2000–02)
- (Denmark) Poul Erik Andreasen (2002–03)
- (Denmark) Søren Kusk Larsen (2003)
- (Sweden) Erik Hamrén (1 January 2004 – 30 May 2008)
- (Scotland) Bruce Rioch (1 July 2008 – 23 October 2008)
- (Denmark) Allan Kuhn (interim) (24 October 2008 – 31 December 2008)
- (Sweden) Magnus Pehrsson (1 January 2009 – 11 October 2010)
- (Denmark) Kent Nielsen (11 October 2010 – 30 June 2015)
- (Denmark) Lars Søndergaard (22 June 2015 – 15 December 2016)
- (Denmark) Morten Wieghorst (2 January 2017 – 25 November 2018)
- (Denmark) Jacob Friis (25 November 2018 – 29 October 2020)
- (Denmark) Peter Feher (interim) (29 October 2020 – 31 December 2020)
- (Spain) Martí Cifuentes (1 January 2021 – 24 January 2022)
- (Sweden) Oscar Hiljemark (interim) (24 January 2022 – 9 March 2022)
- (Denmark) Lars Friis (9 March 2022 – 15 September 2022)
- (Sweden) Erik Hamrén (15 September 2022 – 20 March 2023)
- (Sweden) Oscar Hiljemark (20 March 2023 – 16 April 2024)
- (Norway) Mathias Haugaasen (interim) (16 April 2024 – 27 May 2024)
- (Netherlands) Menno van Dam (27 May 2024 – 20 April 2025)
- (Denmark) Kristoffer Wichmann (23 April 2025 – 26 May 2025)
- (Denmark) Bo Zinck (interim) (19 June 2025 – 29 July 2025)
- (Denmark) Steffen Højer (29 July 2025 – )

== Honours ==
=== Domestic ===
==== Leagues ====
- Danish Superliga
  - Winner (4): 1994–95, 1998–99, 2007–08, 2013–14
  - 3rd place (3): 1935–36, 1969, 2006–07
- Danish 1st Division
  - Winner (2): 1962, 1978
  - 2nd place (1): 2023–24
- Danish 2nd Division
  - Winner (1): 1984
- 49 seasons in the Highest Danish League
- 19 seasons in the Second Highest Danish League
- 5 seasons in the Third Highest Danish League

==== Cups ====
- Danish Cup
  - Winner (3): 1965–66, 1969–70, 2013–14
  - Runner-up (10): 1966–67, 1986–87, 1990–91, 1992–93, 1998–99, 1999–2000, 2003–04, 2008–09, 2019–20, 2022–23
- Danish Supercup
  - Runner-up (3): 1995, 1999, 2004
- Viasat Cup
  - Runner-up (1): 2006
- Provinsmesterskabsturneringen
  - Winner (1): 1928
  - Runner-up (1): 1929

=== European ===
- UEFA Champions League
  - Group stage (2): 1995–96, 2008–09
  - Play-off round (1): 2014–15
  - 3rd qualifying round (1): 1999–2000
- UEFA Europa League
  - Round of 16 (1): 2008–09
  - Round of 32 (1): 2014–15
  - Group stage (1): 2007–08
  - 1st round (3): 1993–94, 1999–2000, 2004–05
  - 2nd qualifying round (2): 2009–10, 2013–14
- UEFA Cup Winners' Cup
  - 1st round (3): 1966–67, 1970–71, 1987–88
- UEFA Intertoto Cup
  - Co-winner (1): 2007
  - Group participants (3): 1996, 1997, 2000

== Seasons ==
Performance graph of Aalborg Boldspilklub

Some matches is regular seasons were played as knockout matches, as a result these are shown in the regular league columns instead of the cup column and with position replaced with win/loss.

| Season | Competition | Pos. | Pl. | W | D | L | GS | GA | P | Cup |
|---|---|---|---|---|---|---|---|---|---|---|
| Spring 1895 | Jutland A-Series Final | W | 1 | N/A | | | 3 | 1 | N/A | N/A |
| Spring 1903 | Jutland A-Series Final | W | 1 | N/A | | | 3 | 1 | N/A | N/A |
| 1906–1907 | Jutland A-Series Final | W | Unknown | | | | | | | N/A |
| 1907–08 | Jutland Circuit | W | Unknown | | | | | | | N/A |
| 1907–08 | Jutland A-Series North Circuit Semi-final | L | 1 | N/A | | | 0 | 2 | N/A | N/A |
| 1908–09 | Unknown | | | | | | | | | N/A |
| 1909–10 | Jutland A-Series North Circuit Final | W | 1 | N/A | | | 3 | 0 | N/A | N/A |
| 1909–10 | Jutland A-Series Final | W | 1 | N/A | | | 4 | 1 | N/A | N/A |
| 1910–11 | Jutland A-Series North Circuit Final | W | 1 | N/A | | | 2 | 1 | N/A | N/A |
| 1910–11 | Jutland A-Series Final | D | 1 | N/A | | | 1 | 1 | N/A | N/A |
| 1910–11 | Jutland A-Series Final Replay | W | 1 | N/A | | | 1 | 0 | N/A | N/A |
| 1911–12 | Jutland A-Series North Circuit Final | W | 1 | N/A | | | 3 | 1 | N/A | N/A |
| 1911–12 | Jutland A-Series Final | L | 1 | N/A | | | 1 | 5 | N/A | N/A |
| 1912–13 | Jutland A-Series North Circuit Final | W | 1 | N/A | | | 4 | 0 | N/A | DNQ |
| 1912–13 | Jutland A-Series Final | L | 1 | N/A | | | 2 | 4 | N/A | DNQ |
| 1913–14 | Jutland A-Series North Circuit Final | W | 1 | N/A | | | 9 | 0 | N/A | DNQ |
| 1913–14 | Jutland A-Series Final | L | 1 | N/A | | | 2 | 4 | N/A | DNQ |
| 1914–15 | Jutland A-Series North Circuit 1 | 2 | 3 | 2 | 0 | 1 | 4 | 3 | 4 | DNQ |
| 1914–15 | Jutland A-Series North Circuit 1 1st place rematch | W | 1 | N/A | | | 4 | 1 | N/A | DNQ |
| 1914–15 | Jutland A-Series North Circuit Final | W | 1 | N/A | | | 5 | 1 | N/A | DNQ |
| 1914–15 | Jutland A-Series Final | L | 1 | N/A | | | 1 | 2 | N/A | DNQ |
| 1915–16 | Jutland A-Series North Circuit 3 | 2 | 6 | 3 | 2 | 1 | unk. | unk. | 8 | DNQ |
| 1916–17 | Jutland A-Series North Circuit 1 | 3 | 6 | 1 | 1 | 4 | 6 | 12 | 3 | DNQ |
| 1917–18 | Jutland A-Series North Circuit 2 | 2 | 6 | 4 | 0 | 2 | unk. | unk. | 8 | DNQ |
| 1918–19 | Jutland A-Series North Circuit 1 | 1 | 6 | 4 | 2 | 0 | 23 | 8 | 10 | DNQ |
| 1918–19 | Jutland A-Series Circuit Final | L | 1 | N/A | | | 0 | 2 | N/A | DNQ |
| 1919–20 | Jutland A-Series North Circuit 2 | 1 | 6 | 5 | 0 | 1 | 27 | 9 | 10 | DNQ |
| 1919–20 | Jutland A-Series Circuit Semi-final | W | 1 | N/A | | | 7 | 4 | N/A | DNQ |
| 1919–20 | Jutland A-Series Circuit Final | W | 1 | N/A | | | 5 | 1 | N/A | DNQ |
| 1919–20 | Jutland A-Series Final | L | 1 | N/A | | | 3 | 5 | N/A | DNQ |
| 1920–21 | Jutland A-Series North Circuit 1 | 1 | 8 | 5 | 2 | 1 | 34 | 19 | 12 | DNQ |
| 1920–21 | Jutland A-Series Circuit Final | L | 1 | N/A | | | 3 | 5 | N/A | DNQ |
| 1921–22 | Jutland A-Series North Circuit 1 | 2 | 6 | 2 | 1 | 3 | 15 | 12 | 5 | DNQ |
| 1922–23 | Jutland A-Series 1st Circuit | 2 | 8 | unk. | | | | | 12 | DNQ |
| 1923–24 | Jutland A-Series 2nd Circuit | 2 | 7 | unk. | | | | | 9 | DNQ |
| 1924–25 | Jutland A-Series 1st Circuit | 1 | 6 | 5 | 1 | 0 | 22 | 4 | 11 | DNQ |
| 1924–25 | Jutland A-Series Circuit Semi-finals | W | 1 | N/A | | | 3 | 2 | N/A | DNQ |
| 1924–25 | Jutland A-Series Circuit Finals | W | 1 | N/A | | | 11 | 0 | N/A | DNQ |
| 1924–25 | Jutland A-Series Final | W | 1 | N/A | | | 8 | 1 | N/A | DNQ |
| 1924–25 | Jutland Qualification to Championship Series | W | 1 | N/A | | | 2 | 1 | N/A | DNQ |
| 1925–26 | Jutland Championship Series | 2 | 10 | 4 | 3 | 3 | 27 | 22 | 11 | DNQ |
| 1926–27 | Jutland Championship North Circuit | 2 | 10 | 6 | 0 | 4 | 41 | 24 | 12 | DNQ |
| 1927–28 | Jutland Championship North Circuit | 1 | 10 | 6 | 3 | 1 | 29 | 20 | 15 | N/A |
| 1927–28 | Jutland Championship Finals | W | 2 | 2 | 0 | 0 | 6 | 0 | 4 | N/A |
| 1928–29 | Danish Championship Tournament 3rd Circuit | 3 | 4 | 2 | 0 | 2 | 10 | 14 | 4 | N/A |
| 1928–29 | Jutland Championship North Circuit | 1 | 10 | 9 | 0 | 1 | 36 | 13 | 18 | N/A |
| 1928–29 | Jutland Championship Finals | W | 2 | 2 | 0 | 0 | 7 | 4 | 3 | N/A |
| 1929–30 | Championship Series | 7 | 9 | 2 | 2 | 5 | 19 | 34 | 6 | N/A |
| 1929–30 | Jutland Championship North Circuit | 1 | 10 | 8 | 0 | 2 | 38 | 19 | 16 | N/A |
| 1929–30 | Jutland Championship Finals | W | 2 | 2 | 0 | 0 | 7 | 2 | 4 | N/A |
| 1930–31 | Championship Series | 7 | 9 | 3 | 0 | 6 | 26 | 46 | 6 | N/A |
| 1930–31 | Jutland Championship North Circuit | 2 | 10 | 6 | 0 | 4 | 37 | 25 | 12 | N/A |
| 1931–32 | Championship Series | 6 | 9 | 3 | 2 | 4 | 28 | 34 | 8 | N/A |
| 1931–32 | Jutland Championship North Circuit | 1 | 10 | 6 | 1 | 3 | 31 | 21 | 13 | N/A |
| 1931–32 | Jutland Championship Finals | W | 3 | 2 | 0 | 1 | 10 | 7 | 4 | N/A |
| 1932–33 | Championship Series | 5 | 9 | 4 | 2 | 3 | 28 | 15 | 10 | N/A |
| 1932–33 | Jutland Championship North Circuit | 1 | 14 | 12 | 0 | 2 | 50 | 25 | 24 | N/A |
| 1932–33 | Jutland Championship Finals | W | 3 | 2 | 0 | 1 | 6 | 4 | 4 | N/A |
| 1933–34 | Championship Series | 8 | 9 | 3 | 0 | 6 | 24 | 39 | 6 | N/A |
| 1933–34 | Jutland Championship North Circuit | 2 | 14 | 8 | 2 | 4 | 49 | 28 | 18 | N/A |
| 1934–35 | Championship Series | 9 | 9 | 2 | 1 | 6 | 17 | 21 | 5 | N/A |
| 1934–35 | Jutland Championship North Circuit | 2 | 14 | 7 | 3 | 4 | 38 | 29 | 17 | N/A |
| 1935–36 | Championship Series | 3 | 9 | 4 | 2 | 3 | 25 | 16 | 10 | N/A |
| 1935–36 | Jutland Championship North Circuit | 2 | 14 | 9 | 1 | 4 | 39 | 23 | 19 | N/A |
| 1936–37 | Championship Series | 6 | 18 | 7 | 2 | 9 | 28 | 45 | 16 | N/A |
| 1936–37 | Jutland Championship Series Semi-finals | L | 1 | N/A | | | 2 | 3 | N/A | N/A |
| 1937–38 | Championship Series | 7 | 18 | 5 | 5 | 8 | 44 | 41 | 15 | N/A |
| 1938–39 | Championship Series | 4 | 18 | 7 | 4 | 7 | 31 | 28 | 18 | N/A |
| 1938–39 | Jutland Championship Series Semi-finals | L | 1 | N/A | | | 1 | 3 | N/A | N/A |
| 1939–40 | Championship Series | 7 | 18 | 7 | 3 | 8 | 30 | 32 | 17 | N/A |
| 1940–41 | Danish Tournament 1st Circuit | 3 | 12 | 6 | 4 | 2 | 21 | 12 | 16 | N/A |
| 1940–41 | Danish Tournament Quarter-final | L | 1 | N/A | | | 2 | 5 | N/A | N/A |
| 1940–41 | Jutland Championship Series Semi-finals | W | 1 | N/A | | | 1 | 0 | N/A | N/A |
| 1940–41 | Jutland Championship Series Finals | W | 1 | N/A | | | 3 | 1 | N/A | N/A |
| 1941–42 | Danish Tournament 1st Circuit | 2 | 18 | 10 | 4 | 4 | 36 | 22 | 24 | N/A |
| 1941–42 | Danish Tournament Quarter-final | L | 1 | N/A | | | 0 | 1 | N/A | N/A |
| 1941–42 | Jutland Championship Series Semi-finals | W | 1 | N/A | | | 4 | 3 | N/A | N/A |
| 1941–42 | Jutland Championship Series Finals | W | 1 | N/A | | | 3 | 1 | N/A | N/A |
| 1942–43 | Danish Tournament 1st Circuit | 5 | 18 | 9 | 1 | 8 | 28 | 31 | 19 | N/A |
| 1943–44 | Danish Tournament 1st Circuit | 5 | 18 | 7 | 3 | 8 | 35 | 36 | 17 | N/A |
| 1944–45 | Danish Tournament 1st Circuit | 3 | 6 | 1 | 2 | 3 | 8 | 14 | 4 | N/A |
| 1945–46 | Danish 1st Division | 9 | 18 | 6 | 2 | 10 | 19 | 38 | 14 | N/A |
| 1946–47 | Danish 1st Division | 10 | 18 | 4 | 1 | 13 | 22 | 51 | 9 | N/A |
| 1947–48 | Danish 2nd Division | 3 | 18 | 9 | 3 | 6 | 36 | 32 | 21 | N/A |
| 1948–49 | Danish 2nd Division | 4 | 18 | 7 | 5 | 6 | 30 | 19 | 19 | N/A |
| 1949–50 | Danish 2nd Division | 6 | 18 | 7 | 3 | 8 | 29 | 35 | 17 | N/A |
| 1949–50 | Jutland Championship Series Semi-final | W | 1 | N/A | | | 2 | 1 | N/A | N/A |
| 1949–50 | Jutland Championship Series Final | L | 1 | N/A | | | 0 | 1 | N/A | N/A |
| 1950–51 | Danish 2nd Division | 3 | 18 | 9 | 4 | 5 | 37 | 26 | 22 | N/A |
| 1951–52 | Danish 2nd Division | 9 | 18 | 3 | 5 | 10 | 29 | 42 | 11 | N/A |
| 1952–53 | Danish 2nd Division | 8 | 18 | 6 | 1 | 11 | 28 | 37 | 13 | N/A |
| 1953–54 | Danish 2nd Division | 5 | 18 | 7 | 4 | 7 | 41 | 42 | 18 | N/A |
| 1954–55 | Danish 2nd Division | 10 | 18 | 3 | 5 | 10 | 23 | 45 | 11 | 4th round |
| 1955–56 | Danish 3rd Division | 5 | 22 | 9 | 5 | 8 | 47 | 45 | 23 | 4th round |
| 1956–57 | Danish 3rd Division | 5 | 33 | 18 | 5 | 10 | 84 | 50 | 41 | 3rd round |
| 1958 | Danish 2nd Division | 8 | 22 | 6 | 6 | 10 | 33 | 46 | 18 | 3rd round |
| 1959 | Danish 2nd Division | 7 | 22 | 8 | 4 | 10 | 46 | 53 | 20 | 2nd round |
| 1960 | Danish 2nd Division | 6 | 22 | 7 | 7 | 8 | 33 | 38 | 21 | 2nd round |
| 1961 | Danish 2nd Division | 3 | 22 | 12 | 6 | 4 | 53 | 30 | 30 | 2nd round |
| 1962 | Danish 2nd Division | 1 | 22 | 12 | 5 | 5 | 43 | 40 | 29 | 4th round |
| 1963 | Danish 1st Division | 11 | 22 | 7 | 4 | 11 | 30 | 46 | 18 | 3rd round |
| 1964 | Danish 2nd Division | 2 | 22 | 14 | 3 | 5 | 56 | 32 | 31 | 3rd round |
| 1965 | Danish 1st Division | 7 | 22 | 7 | 7 | 8 | 32 | 27 | 21 | 2nd round |
| 1966 | Danish 1st Division | 9 | 22 | 9 | 2 | 11 | 32 | 32 | 20 | Winner |
| 1967 | Danish 1st Division | 5 | 22 | 7 | 9 | 6 | 38 | 36 | 23 | final |
| 1968 | Danish 1st Division | 7 | 22 | 7 | 7 | 8 | 37 | 35 | 21 | quarter-final |
| 1969 | Danish 1st Division | 3 | 22 | 12 | 5 | 5 | 52 | 26 | 29 | semi-final |
| 1970 | Danish 1st Division | 8 | 22 | 9 | 3 | 10 | 34 | 29 | 21 | Winner |
| 1971 | Danish 1st Division | 11 | 22 | 7 | 4 | 11 | 37 | 47 | 18 | 3rd round |
| 1972 | Danish 2nd Division | 2 | 22 | 12 | 4 | 6 | 60 | 40 | 28 | 3rd round |
| 1973 | Danish 1st Division | 6 | 22 | 6 | 9 | 7 | 32 | 30 | 21 | 3rd round |
| 1974 | Danish 1st Division | 10 | 22 | 6 | 7 | 9 | 35 | 41 | 19 | semi-final |
| 1975 | Danish 1st Division | 7 | 30 | 14 | 5 | 11 | 63 | 49 | 33 | semi-final |
| 1976 | Danish 1st Division | 4 | 30 | 15 | 7 | 8 | 55 | 41 | 37 | 4th round |
| 1977 | Danish 1st Division | 14 | 30 | 6 | 10 | 14 | 33 | 43 | 22 | semi-final |
| 1978 | Danish 2nd Division | 1 | 30 | 17 | 8 | 5 | 64 | 36 | 42 | semi-final |
| 1979 | Danish 1st Division | 12 | 30 | 10 | 6 | 14 | 42 | 45 | 26 | 2nd round |
| 1980 | Danish 1st Division | 16 | 30 | 2 | 2 | 26 | 27 | 85 | 6 | 2nd round |
| 1981 | Danish 2nd Division | 14 | 30 | 8 | 5 | 17 | 26 | 55 | 21 | 3rd round |
| 1982 | Danish 3rd Division | 10 | 30 | 11 | 6 | 13 | 45 | 40 | 28 | 3rd round |
| 1983 | Danish 3rd Division | 10 | 30 | 12 | 6 | 12 | 45 | 43 | 30 | 1st round |
| 1984 | Danish 3rd Division | 1 | 30 | 21 | 6 | 3 | 77 | 37 | 48 | 4th round |
| 1985 | Danish 2nd Division | 5 | 30 | 14 | 8 | 8 | 60 | 48 | 36 | semi-final |
| 1986 | Danish 2nd Division | 2 | 30 | 13 | 12 | 5 | 56 | 36 | 38 | 2nd round |
| 1987 | Danish 1st Division | 10 | 26 | 7 | 6 | 13 | 27 | 38 | 20 | final |
| 1988 | Danish 1st Division | 11 | 26 | 8 | 6 | 12 | 33 | 50 | 22 | 4th round |
| 1989 | Danish 1st Division | 11 | 26 | 5 | 9 | 12 | 30 | 39 | 19 | quarter-final |
| 1990 | Danish 1st Division | 10 | 26 | 8 | 10 | 8 | 32 | 34 | 26 | 4th round |
| 1991 | Danish Superliga | 6 | 18 | 6 | 5 | 7 | 29 | 33 | 17 | final |
| 1991–92 | Danish Superliga | 4 | 18 | 6 | 7 | 5 | 29 | 25 | 19 | quarter-final |
| 1991–92 | Danish Superliga Playoffs | 5 | 14 | 4 | 5 | 5 | 16 | 19 | 13+10 | quarter-final |
| 1992–93 | Danish Superliga | 3 | 18 | 7 | 7 | 4 | 25 | 17 | 21 | final |
| 1992–93 | Danish Superliga Playoffs | 4 | 14 | 5 | 5 | 4 | 23 | 23 | 15+11 | final |
| 1993–94 | Danish Superliga | 6 | 18 | 4 | 9 | 5 | 28 | 25 | 17 | quarter-final |
| 1993–94 | Danish Superliga Playoffs | 5 | 14 | 4 | 6 | 4 | 18 | 19 | 14+9 | quarter-final |
| 1994–95 | Danish Superliga | 2 | 18 | 12 | 2 | 4 | 44 | 25 | 26 | semi-final |
| 1994–95 | Danish Superliga Playoffs | 1 | 14 | 7 | 4 | 3 | 30 | 13 | 18+13 | semi-final |
| 1995–96 | Danish Superliga | 5 | 33 | 15 | 6 | 12 | 57 | 38 | 51 | quarter-final |
| 1996–97 | Danish Superliga | 5 | 33 | 12 | 11 | 10 | 46 | 40 | 47 | quarter-final |
| 1997–98 | Danish Superliga | 7 | 33 | 12 | 8 | 13 | 54 | 48 | 44 | quarter-final |
| 1998–99 | Danish Superliga | 1 | 33 | 17 | 13 | 3 | 65 | 37 | 64 | final |
| 1999–00 | Danish Superliga | 5 | 33 | 12 | 13 | 8 | 57 | 40 | 49 | final |
| 2000–01 | Danish Superliga | 5 | 33 | 13 | 10 | 10 | 51 | 49 | 49 | 5th round |
| 2001–02 | Danish Superliga | 4 | 33 | 16 | 6 | 11 | 52 | 45 | 54 | quarter-final |
| 2002–03 | Danish Superliga | 6 | 33 | 14 | 4 | 15 | 42 | 45 | 46 | semi-final |
| 2003–04 | Danish Superliga | 5 | 33 | 16 | 9 | 8 | 55 | 41 | 57 | final |
| 2004–05 | Danish Superliga | 4 | 33 | 15 | 8 | 10 | 59 | 45 | 53 | 5th round |
| 2005–06 | Danish Superliga | 5 | 33 | 11 | 12 | 10 | 48 | 44 | 45 | semi-final |
| 2006–07 | Danish Superliga | 3 | 33 | 18 | 7 | 8 | 55 | 34 | 61 | 2nd round |
| 2007–08 | Danish Superliga | 1 | 33 | 22 | 5 | 6 | 60 | 38 | 71 | 4th round |
| 2008–09 | Danish Superliga | 7 | 33 | 9 | 12 | 12 | 40 | 49 | 39 | final |
| 2009–10 | Danish Superliga | 5 | 33 | 13 | 9 | 11 | 36 | 30 | 48 | 4th round |
| 2010–11 | Danish Superliga | 10 | 33 | 8 | 11 | 14 | 38 | 48 | 35 | quarter-final |
| 2011–12 | Danish Superliga | 7 | 33 | 12 | 8 | 13 | 42 | 48 | 44 | 2nd round |
| 2012–13 | Danish Superliga | 5 | 33 | 13 | 8 | 12 | 51 | 46 | 47 | 4th round |
| 2013–14 | Danish Superliga | 1 | 33 | 18 | 8 | 7 | 60 | 38 | 62 | Winner |
| 2014–15 | Danish Superliga | 5 | 33 | 13 | 9 | 11 | 39 | 31 | 48 | quarter-final |
| 2015–16 | Danish Superliga | 5 | 33 | 15 | 5 | 13 | 56 | 44 | 50 | semi-final |
| 2016–17 | Danish Superliga | 10 | 34 | 10 | 8 | 16 | 31 | 49 | 38 | quarter-final |
| 2017–18 | Danish Superliga | 5 | 36 | 10 | 15 | 11 | 38 | 44 | 45 | quarter-final |
| 2018–19 | Danish Superliga | 9 | 34 | 10 | 12 | 12 | 44 | 44 | 42 | semi-final |
| 2019–20 | Danish Superliga | 5 | 36 | 16 | 6 | 14 | 54 | 44 | 54 | final |
| 2020–21 | Danish Superliga | 7 | 32 | 12 | 10 | 10 | 44 | 41 | 46 | 4th round |
| 2021–22 | Danish Superliga | 5 | 32 | 13 | 6 | 13 | 47 | 45 | 45 | 4th round |
| 2022–23 | Danish Superliga | 12 | 32 | 6 | 9 | 17 | 34 | 45 | 27 | final |
| 2023–24 | Danish 1st Division | 2 | 32 | 19 | 8 | 5 | 66 | 38 | 65 | 3rd round |
| 2024–25 | Danish Superliga | 12 | 32 | 5 | 9 | 18 | 34 | 67 | 24 | quarter final |
| 2025–26 | Danish 1st Division | 7 | 32 | 12 | 10 | 10 | 50 | 47 | 46 | ? |

== See also ==
- AaB Women
