= Nørresundby FB =

Danish football club

- Full name: Nørresundby Forenede Boldklubber
- Founded: 1 July 2015; 10 years ago
- Ground: Nordjyske Bank Arena, Nørresundby
- Capacity: 1,200
- Chairman: Thomas Bunch Jensen
- Head coach: Casper Bøge Fallingborg
- League: Denmark Series
- 2024–25: Denmark Series; Promotion Group 2, 9th of 10
- Website: www.nørresundbyfb.dk
Home colours

Nørresundby Forenede Boldklubber (Danish pronunciation: [nɶɐ̯ʌˈsɔnpyˀ fʌˈe̝ˀnəð̩ ˈpʌltkʰlupɐ]; commonly known as Nørresundby FB) is an association football club based in the town of Nørresundby, Aalborg Municipality, Denmark, that competes in the Denmark Series, the fifth tier of the Danish football league system. Founded in 2015 as a merger between Lindholm IF and Nørresundby Boldklub, it is affiliated to the regional football association, DBU Jutland. The team plays its home matches at Lindholm Høje Stadion where it has been based since its foundation. The stadium has a capacity of 1,200.

== History ==
=== Foundation and background ===
Plans for a merger between Lindholm IF and Nørresundby Boldklub (NBK) were initiated in November 2008. These plans originated in decades of cooperation between different clubs in Nørresundby, and took a more definitive form in 2008 with the merger of youth departments between Lindholm, NBK and NUBI. The youth academy was named FC Solsiden. When a concrete merger and the establishment of a superstructure of the senior sides was put to a vote in the three clubs in the spring of 2014, terms were accepted at the general assembly meetings at Lindholm and NBK while NUBI decided to leave to collaboration. The founding date of the new club, named Nørresundby Forenede Boldklubber (Nørresundby FB), was officially set to 1 July 2015. The name was chosen among members of the two parent clubs, as well as the red home colours.

One of the two parent clubs, Nørresundby Boldklub, had an illustrious history. Founded on 6 June 1946 as a merger between the two clubs Thor and Velo, the club spent the following decades in the lower tiers of the Danish football league system while being mostly known for its strong youth academy. Thus, Danish international Henning Jensen made his start in the club before signing with Borussia Mönchengladbach in 1972. NBK reached the national divisions in 1978, after reaching promotion from the regional leagues in 1978 under new head coach, Scottish Don Mackay, who was mostly known for his tenure as a player for Dundee United. After struggling to establish itself in the third division for some seasons, the club stabilised under new head coach Kjeld Seneca who led the side to wins over main rival AaB in a derby which became known as Kampen om Limfjorden ("The Battle of the Limfjord"). NBK's golden era was between 1988 and 1993 under head coaches Poul Erik Andreasen and later Ove Christensen, who led the team from the fourth division to the second division of Danish football in two years; a division then called Kvalifikationsligaen. NBK suffered relegation in 1993, and would struggle in the two following decades.
