= 1994–95 Danish Superliga =

5th season of Danish Superliga

Coca-Cola Ligaen
- Champions: Aalborg BK
- Relegated: BK Fremad Amager

The 1994–95 Danish Superliga season was the 5th season of the Danish Superliga league championship, governed by the Danish Football Association.

The tournament was held in two rounds. The first round was in autumn 1994, and the second in spring 1995. The teams that placed first to eighth in first round, played in second round. Their goal scores were reset to zero, and their mutual points were shorted to the half.

The two teams placed ninth and tenth in first round, played in the qualification league in the spring. They had respectively 8 and 7 points with.

The Danish champions qualified for the UEFA Champions League 1995-96 qualification, while the second and third placed teams qualified for the qualification round of the UEFA Cup 1995-96. The fourth and sixth placed teams qualified for the UEFA Intertoto Cup 1995. The teams placed first to fourth in the qualification league promoted.

== Autumn 1994 ==
=== Table ===
Pos	Team	Pld	W	D	L	GF	GA	GD	Pts	Qualification or relegation
1	Brøndby IF	18	12	3	3	41	19	+22	27	Qualification to Spring 1995 competition
2	Aalborg BK	18	12	2	4	44	25	+19	26	Qualification to Spring 1995 competition
3	Odense BK	18	10	4	4	31	21	+10	24	Qualification to Spring 1995 competition
4	Lyngby FC	18	6	7	5	34	27	+7	19	Qualification to Spring 1995 competition
5	Silkeborg IF	18	5	7	6	21	23	−2	17	Qualification to Spring 1995 competition
6	Næstved IF	18	5	7	6	26	31	−5	17	Qualification to Spring 1995 competition
7	FC København	18	6	4	8	30	34	−4	16	Qualification to Spring 1995 competition
8	Aarhus GF	18	5	5	8	21	35	−14	15	Qualification to Spring 1995 competition
9	Ikast FS	18	3	5	10	22	29	−7	11	Qualification to Qualification League
10	BK Fremad Amager	18	4	0	14	21	47	−26	8	Qualification to Qualification League

Rules for classification: 1) points; 2) goal difference; 3) number of goals scored.

=== Results ===
Home \ Away	AGF	BIF	FCK	FA	IFS	LFC	NIF	OB	SIF	AAB
AGF		0–2	3–1	2–1	0–2	2–0	2–2	5–0	0–5	0–3
Brøndby IF	5–1		0–4	3–0	1–0	3–2	2–0	1–1	0–0	6–2
F.C. Copenhagen	1–1	2–1		2–3	3–2	0–3	1–1	0–1	3–0	2–0
Fremad Amager	0–1	1–6	3–2		3–2	0–5	1–2	0–2	1–3	1–2
Ikast FS	1–1	0–2	2–0	4–0		2–2	1–2	1–4	1–1	1–2
Lyngby FC	2–2	0–3	0–0	2–3	2–0		2–2	2–1	3–2	3–0
Næstved IF	4–1	2–3	2–3	2–1	2–2	2–2		1–3	0–0	1–1
OB	1–0	0–0	4–1	2–1	1–1	2–1	2–0		3–0	2–4
Silkeborg IF	0–0	0–2	3–3	1–0	1–0	2–2	0–1	1–1		2–1
AaB	5–0	4–1	5–2	4–2	2–0	1–1	4–0	2–1	2–0	

== Spring 1995 ==
=== Table ===
Pos	Team	Pld	W	D	L	GF	GA	GD	Pts	Qualification or relegation
1	Aalborg BK (C)	14	7	4	3	30	13	+17	31	Qualification to Champions League qualifying round
2	Brøndby IF	14	6	3	5	21	18	+3	29	Qualification to UEFA Cup preliminary round
3	Silkeborg IF	14	6	3	5	23	16	+7	24	Qualification to UEFA Cup preliminary round
4	Aarhus GF	14	7	2	5	21	23	−2	24	Qualification to Intertoto Cup group stage
5	Næstved IF	14	5	4	5	21	22	−1	23	Qualification to Intertoto Cup group stage
6	FC København	14	5	4	5	21	28	−7	22	Qualification to Cup Winners' Cup first round
7	Lyngby FC	14	5	1	8	20	28	−8	21	
8	Odense BK	14	3	3	8	17	26	−9	21	Qualification to Intertoto Cup group stage

Rules for classification: 1) points; 2) goal difference; 3) number of goals scored.
(C) Champions

=== Results ===
Home \ Away	AGF	BIF	FCK	LFC	NIF	OB	SIF	AAB
AGF		3–0	3–0	3–2	0–0	2–1	1–0	2–1
Brøndby IF	4–1		2–3	1–2	2–1	2–0	0–0	2–1
F.C. Copenhagen	2–2	1–0		3–2	2–1	1–1	2–2	0–4
Lyngby FC	2–0	0–3	1–0		3–2	1–4	2–0	2–2
Næstved IF	1–2	2–2	3–2	2–1		3–1	0–0	1–1
OB	3–1	1–1	1–2	3–1	0–2		2–4	0–4
Silkeborg IF	3–1	2–0	4–1	4–1	1–2	2–0		0–2
AaB	4–0	1–2	2–2	1–0	5–1	0–0	2–1	

== Top goal scorers ==
Rank	Player	Club	Goals
1	(Denmark) Erik Bo Andersen	Aalborg BK	24
2	(Denmark) Peter Rasmussen	Aalborg BK	16
3	(Denmark) Mark Strudal	Brøndby IF	12
3	(Denmark) Per Frandsen	F.C. Copenhagen	12
3	(Denmark) Lars Højer Nielsen	F.C. Copenhagen	12
6	(Denmark) Bo Hansen	Brøndby IF	11
7	(Denmark) Ove Hansen	Ikast fS/Odense BK	10
7	(Denmark) Per Pedersen	Lyngby BK	10
7	(Denmark) Alex Nielsen	Næstved IF	10
7	(Denmark) Heine Fernandez	Silkeborg IF	10

== Attendances ==
No.	Club	Average
1	Brøndby	10,124
2	AaB	9,765
3	København	8,715
4	AGF	7,494
5	Silkeborg	5,127
6	OB	4,075
7	Næstved	2,977
8	Lyngby	2,890
9	Fremad Amager	2,425
10	Ikast	1,758

== See also ==
- 1994-95 in Danish football
