= 2008–09 Danish Cup =

DBU Pokalen (The DBU Cup)

Tournament details
- Country: Denmark

Final positions
- Champions: F.C. Copenhagen
- Runners-up: Aalborg BK

The 2008–09 Danish Cup was the 55th season of only Danish football cup competition. It was the first time since 2004 that the cup had a sponsor name: the daily newspaper Ekstra Bladet has signed a 3-year contract with the Danish Football Association (DBU), making the official name Ekstra Bladet Cup 2008–09.

The competition started on 12 August 2008 with the first round and concluded on 21 May 2009, with the final, held at Parken Stadium.

== First round ==
In this round entered 96 teams. These include 55 teams from lower divisions, who have qualified through preliminary cups held by the regional associations, 25 teams from 2007–08 Second Divisions and all 16 teams from First Division.

The draw for the First Round was held at Ekstra Bladet's premises at The City Hall Square in Copenhagen. The matches were played around 13 August 2008.

=== West group ===
The west group consisted of 46 teams. These were split into 5 minor groups.

==== North group ====
12 August 2008	Nibe B	0–4	Blokhus FC	Nibe
18:30 CEST			N. Thomsen 52'; Tranberg 53'; Andresen 70'; J. Thomsen 87'	Stadium: Nibe Stadion; Referee: Lars Østergaard Poulsen

13 August 2008	Sæby IF Skjold	0–2	Aalborg Freja	Sæby
18:30 CEST				Stadium: Sæby Stadion; Referee: Henrik Larsen

13 August 2008	Møldrup/Tostrup IF	2–1	Aars FC	Møldrup
18:30 CEST				Stadium: Møldrup Stadion; Referee: Henrik Nystrup Kragh

13 August 2008	Tårs/Ugilt IF	2–1	FC Hjørring	Tårs
18:30 CEST				Stadium: Tårs Stadion; Referee: Rasmus Møller Bøjer

13 August 2008	Skagen IK	2–0	Kvik/Aalestrup IF	Skagen
18:30 CEST				Stadium: Skagen Stadion; Referee: Lars Halskov

13 August 2008	Thisted FC	0–1	Hobro IK	Thisted
19:00 CEST			Povlsen 51'	Stadium: Sparekassen Thy Arena; Attendance: 451; Referee: Michael Svendsen

==== Central group ====
12 August 2008	Christiansbjerg IF	5–1	Lemvig GF	Aarhus
18:30 CEST				Stadium: CIF's Anlæg; Referee: Peter Kjærsgaard-Andersen

13 August 2008	Hammerum IF	1–3	Holstebro BK	Herning
18:30 CEST	Kristensen		Ramsdal; Givskov	Stadium: Hammerum Stadion; Referee: Henning Jensen

13 August 2008	Aarhus Fremad	1–3	Silkeborg IF	Aarhus
18:30 CEST	Jensen 57'		Pedersen 39'; Lekic 75'; Svensson 90+1'	Stadium: Riisvangen Stadion; Attendance: 283; Referee: Heine Sørensen

13 August 2008	ASA	0–2	Viby IF	Aarhus
18:30 CEST				Stadium: ASA's Idrætsanlæg; Referee: Henrik Overgaard

13 August 2008	Ringkøbing IF	5–1	Viborg Søndermarken IK	Ringkøbing
18:30 CEST				Stadium: Alkjær Stadion; Referee: Jens Ø. Poulsen

13 August 2008	Skovbakken IK	3–3 (a.e.t.) (3–4 p)	Skive IK	Aarhus
18:30 CEST	Poulsen 42'; Sivertsen 112'; Nørdam 116'		Ankjær 88', 114'; Dyring 110' (pen.)	Stadium: Vejlby Stadion; Referee: Jens Maae
	Penalties
	Nørlem (penalty scored); Sivertsen (penalty missed); Rittig (penalty missed); Rajcetic (penalty scored); Ulrich (penalty scored)		(penalty scored) Dyring; (penalty scored) P. Nielsen; (penalty scored) Ankjær; (penalty missed) Lawal; (penalty scored) J. Nielsen

==== South group ====
12 August 2008	Vinding SF	15–0	Hviding IF	Vejle
18:30 CEST	Junker; Bechmann; Apr; Melson; Jensen; Møller			Stadium: Vinding Stadion; Referee: Allan Staal

13 August 2008	BPI	0–7	Vejle Boldklub	Fredericia
18:30 CEST			Lawal 18' (pen.); Zivkovic 19'; Arrieta 24'; Præst 40'; Nørlund 42', 44'; Lund 75'	Stadium: Pjedsted Stadion; Attendance: 754; Referee: Claus Bo Larsen

13 August 2008	Esbjerg IF 92	0–2	Varde IF	Esbjerg
18:30 CEST			77' (o.g.); Andersen 90'	Stadium: Skibhøj Anlæg; Referee: Jørgen Nielsen

13 August 2008	Tjæreborg IF	3–1	Fredericia fF	Tjæreborg
18:30 CEST				Stadium: Tjæreborg IF's Anlæg; Referee: Dennis Mogensen

13 August 2008	Brabrand IF	0–1	FC Fredericia	Aarhus
18:30 CEST			Kristensen 6'	Stadium: Brabrand Stadion; Attendance: 187; Referee: Jakob Kehlet

13 August 2008	SønderjyskE	2–1	Kolding FC	Haderslev
19:00 CEST	Lauridsen 25'; Gormsen 90+4'		Christiansen 60'	Stadium: Haderslev Fodboldstadion; Attendance: 623; Referee: Mads-Kristoffer Kristoffersen

==== Funen group ====
12 August 2008	Glamsbjerg IF	0–5	Assens FC	Glamsbjerg
18:30 CEST			Nielsen 8', 86'; Uldal 14'; West-Hansen 31', 77'	Stadium: Glamsbjerg Stadion; Attendance: 150; Referee: Hans-Henrik Høite Hansen

13 August 2008	Sanderum BK	1–2	Næsby BK	Odense
18:30 CEST				Stadium: Vestfalen Stadion; Referee: Tom Krøyer

13 August 2008	BK Chang	0–4	Marstal/Rise	Odense
18:30 CEST				Stadium: Chang Kochsgade; Referee: Hans-Henrik Høite Hansen

13 August 2008	Stige BK	0–1	FC Fyn	Odense
18:30 CEST			Andreasen 32'	Stadium: Stige Stadion; Referee: Casper Kristensen

13 August 2008	Tåsinge fB	0–2	OKS	Svendborg
18:30 CEST			Møller; Bramming	Stadium: Tåsingehallen; Referee: Kent Bøgelund

==== East/south group ====
13 August 2008	Faxe BK	1–6	FC Vestsjælland	Faxe
18:30 CEST				Stadium: Fakse Stadion; Referee: Thomas Kurt Nielsen

13 August 2008	B73 Slagelse	4–3	Nakskov BK	Slagelse
18:30 CEST	Pedersen 29', 55'; J. Christensen 58'; R. Christensen 84'		Jensen 54', 80'; Ottesen 83'	Stadium: Stadion Vest; Referee: Benjamin Helm Svedborg

13 August 2008	BK Frem Sakskøbing	2–0	Maribo BK	Sakskøbing
18:30 CEST				Stadium: Sakskøbing Stadion; Referee: Michael Schlander

13 August 2008	Ørslev GIF	0–6	Herfølge BK	Vordingborg
18:30 CEST			Toft 15', 28'; Benjaminsen 20'; Belling 35'; Rynell 44'; Simonsen 45'	Stadium: Ørslev Sportsplads; Attendance: 425; Referee: Martin Olsgaard

13 August 2008	Næstved BK	3–0	Lolland-Falster Alliancen	Næstved
19:00 CEST	Jensen 44', 82'; Johansen 73'			Stadium: Næstved Stadion; Attendance: 561; Referee: Jens Jørgen Jensen

=== East group ===
The east group consisted of 40 teams.

12 August 2008	BK Viktoria	1–3	AB 70	Copenhagen
18:30 CEST				Stadium: Fælledparken; Referee: Morten Skov

12 August 2008	B 1960	0–4	B 1908	Copenhagen
18:30 CEST			Bisp 20'; Damstoft 24', 69'; Haustein 87'	Stadium: Grønnemosen; Referee: Thomas Lautrup Thorgaard

13 August 2008	Rønne fB	0–3	BK Frem	Rønne
16:30 CEST			Weibel 2'; Ilsø 26'; Simonsen 71'	Stadium: Rønne Stadion Nord; Referee: Christian Brixen

13 August 2008	Østerbro IF	0–3	B.93	Copenhagen
18:30 CEST				Stadium: Fælledparken; Referee: Bjarne Nigaard

13 August 2008	Gentofte-Vangede IF	0–2	FC Roskilde	Gentofte
18:30 CEST				Stadium: GVI Nymosen; Referee: Lars Muusmann

13 August 2008	Værløse BK	0–3	Greve Fodbold	Værløse
18:30 CEST			Berg 4', 40'; Bogh 54' (o.g.)	Stadium: Værløse Stadion; Referee: Jesper Dahl

13 August 2008	FC Lejre	4–2	FB	Lejre
18:30 CEST				Stadium: Lejrehallen; Referee: Christian Lindberg

13 August 2008	BK Fix	0–6	Brønshøj BK	Copenhagen
18:30 CEST			König 22', 39'; Tronborg 23', 69', 82'; Larsen 85'	Stadium: Gadelandet; Attendance: 300; Referee: Darko Haramija

13 August 2008	Ledøje-Smørum Fodbold	0–1	Jægersborg BK	Smørum
18:30 CEST				Stadium: Ledøje Idrætscenter; Referee: Anders Poulsen

13 August 2008	Hundested IK	1–2	Solrød FC	Hundested
18:30 CEST				Stadium: Hundestedhallen; Referee: Paul Knudsen

13 August 2008	Vanløse IF	5–1 (a.e.t.)	BSV	Copenhagen
18:30 CEST				Stadium: Vanløse Idrætspark; Referee: Lars Skibild Jensen

13 August 2008	Rishøj BK	4–1	Herlev IF	Køge
18:30 CEST				Stadium: Rishøj Stadion; Referee: Kenneth Sørensen

13 August 2008	BK Rødovre	0–4	BK Avarta	Rødovre
18:30 CEST			Kjølbye 18'; Fosgaard 24'; Christensen 31', 62'	Stadium: Rødovre Stadion; Attendance: 350; Referee: Thomas Lautrup Thorgaard

13 August 2008	Allerød FK	3–1	BK Skjold	Allerød
18:30 CEST				Stadium: Skovvang Stadion; Referee: Morten Skov

13 August 2008	Fredensborg BI	1–3	HIK	Fredensborg
18:30 CEST				Stadium: Fredensborg Stadion; Referee: Philip Gojko Pilipovic

13 August 2008	Skovlunde IF	1–4	FC Amager	Copenhagen
18:30 CEST	Meisler 45'		Abdalas 4'; Josephsen 50'; Qvist 60'; Holmberg 65'	Stadium: Ballerup Idrætspark; Attendance: 201; Referee: Lars Christoffersen

13 August 2008	Nordvest FC	3–1	Stenløse BK	Holbæk
18:30 CEST				Stadium: Holbæk Stadion; Referee: Emil Laursen

13 August 2008	AB	5–1	Køge BK	Copenhagen
19:00 CEST	Theilgaard 3'; Boysen 36', 53'; Lyngsø Olsen 84' (pen.), 90'		47'	Stadium: Gladsaxe Stadion; Attendance: 441; Referee: Ulrik van der Leerden

13 August 2008	Ølstykke FC	1–6	Hvidovre IF	Ølstykke
19:00 CEST				Stadium: Ølstykke Stadion; Referee: Anders Hermansen

19 August 2008	Albertslund IF	0–3	Glostrup FK	Albertslund
18:30 CEST				Stadium: Albertslund Stadion; Referee: Tom Krøyer

== Second round ==
The winners from the First Round progressed to the Second Round. Eight additional teams, placed fifth to twelfth in the 2007–08 Superliga, contested in this round.

The draw for the Second Round was held at Ekstra Bladet's premises at The City Hall Square in Copenhagen. The matches were played on 23 and 24 August 2008.

=== West group ===
The west group consisted of 28 teams.

23 August 2008	Christiansbjerg IF	1–3	Varde IF	Aarhus
13:30 CEST	Axelsen 60'		Kruse 32'; L. Nielsen 34'; Jessen 70'	Stadium: CIF's anlæg Referee: Jens Ø. Poulsen

23 August 2008	OKS	0–1	Hobro IK	Odense
14:00 CEST			Hammershøj 89'	Stadium: OKSON-Park; Referee: Michael Schlander

23 August 2008	Tjæreborg IF	1–10	Esbjerg fB	Tjæreborg
15:00 CEST	Vind 71'		Fribrock 13', 18'; Mehl 23'; Hansen 31'; Vingaard 61'; Rieks 67', 90'; Thorvaldsson 68', 85'; Thiago 78'	Stadium: Tjæreborg IF's Anlæg; Attendance: 1,246; Referee: Henning Jensen

23 August 2008	Ringkøbing IF	1–5	Skive IK	Ringkøbing
15:30 CEST	Lauritzen 32'		Thomsen 38', 80'; Shahpar 46', 62', 82'	Stadium: Alkjær Stadion; Referee: Michael Tykgaard

23 August 2008	Aalborg Freja	0–2	FC Fyn	Aalborg
16:00 CEST			Fagerberg 21'; Fønss 84'	Stadium: Frejaparken; Attendance: 175; Referee: Rasmus Møller Bøjer

23 August 2008	Vinding SF	1–5	FC Fredericia	Vejle
16:00 CEST				Stadium: Vinding Stadion; Attendance: 300; Referee: Mads-Kristoffer Kristoffersen

23 August 2008	Skagen IK	0–1	Blokhus FC	Skagen
16:00 CEST			Tranberg 72' (pen.)	Stadium: Skagen Stadion; Attendance: 295; Referee: Henrik Larsen

23 August 2008	Viby IF	0–8	AGF	Aarhus
17:00 CEST			Graulund 2', 27'; Rafael 16'; Lucena 22'; Vibe 54', 90'; Williams 79', 85'	Stadium: Viby Idrætspark; Attendance: 1,437; Referee: Henrik Nystrup Kragh

23 August 2008	Møldrup/Tostrup IF	0–5	Randers FC	Møldrup
18:00 CEST			Ahmed; Nguyen; Olsen; Buval; Holdgaard	Stadium: Møldrup Stadion; Referee: Nicolai Vollquartz

24 August 2008	Assens FC	0–4	SønderjyskE	Assens
14:00 CEST			Ilsø; Stolberg; Kristoffersen	Stadium: Assens Stadion; Referee: Kent Bøgelund

24 August 2008	Marstal/Rise	2–7	Viborg FF	Marstal
14:00 CEST	Goal		Kryger; Tüchsen; Vestergaard; Muomaife	Stadium: Marstal Stadion; Referee: Tom Krøyer

24 August 2008	Holstebro BK	4–1	Næsby BK	Holstebro
15:00 CEST				Stadium: Holstebro Idrætspark; Referee: Michael Svendsen

24 August 2008	Silkeborg IF	1–2	AC Horsens	Silkeborg
15:00 CEST	Pedersen 8'		Lawan 66'; Gil 89'	Stadium: Silkeborg Stadion; Attendance: 1,291; Referee: Claus Bo Larsen

24 August 2008	Tårs/Ugilt IF	0–8	Vejle Boldklub	Tårs
18:00 CEST			Borre 30', 57', 68'; Lai 37'; Nørlund 38'; 47' (o.g.); Kielstrup 50'; Lawal 89'	Stadium: Tårs Stadion; Referee: Lars Østergaard Poulsen

=== East group ===
The east group consisted of 28 teams.

23 August 2008	Jægersborg BK	0–2	Næstved BK	Gentofte
11:00 CEST			Jensen 19', 64'	Stadium: JB's anlæg Attendance: 100; Referee: Jesper Dahl

23 August 2008	Rishøj BK	2–3	Brønshøj BK	Køge
13:00 CEST	11' 14'		König 3'; Tronborg 45'; Larsen 87'	Stadium: Rishøj Stadion; Referee: Thomas Dahl

23 August 2008	Greve Fodbold	1–9	FC Nordsjælland	Greve
14:00 CEST	T. Pedersen 46' (pen.)		Storm 9', 31', 83', 88'; Dahl 11'; N. Pedersen 18'; Pode 43'; Rasmussen 58'; Fetai 65'	Stadium: Greve Idræts Center; Attendance: 188; Referee: Michael Johansen

23 August 2008	FC Lejre	0–3	Hvidovre IF	Osted
15:00 CEST				Stadium: Osted Stadion; Referee: Thomas Kurt Nielsen

23 August 2008	AB 70	0–4	BK Avarta	Copenhagen
15:00 CEST			Fosgaard 6'; Larsen 47'; Rosnell 50'; Christensen 74' (pen.)	Stadium: Vestamager Idrætspark; Attendance: 75; Referee: Johnnie Espersen

23 August 2008	B 1908	3–5	FC Vestsjælland	Copenhagen
15:00 CEST	Haustein 11'; Witt 73'; Speiermann 74'		Mortensen 21', 58'; Festersen 27', 64'; Tengbjerg 90'	Stadium: Sundby Idrætspark; Attendance: 84; Referee: Claus Høegh-Jensen

23 August 2008	B.93	1–4	Lyngby Boldklub	Copenhagen
15:00 CEST	Bakovic		Kristensen; Beckmann; Aabech	Stadium: Valby Idrætspark; Attendance: 400; Referee: Brian Lindorf Hansen

23 August 2008	Solrød FC	2–5	Herfølge BK	Solrød Strand
15:00 CEST	Jørgensen 26'; Guldborg 78' (o.g.)		Toft 31', 90'; Benjaminsen 38', 85'; Andersen 60'	Stadium: Solrød Idrætscenter; Attendance: 138; Referee: Martin Olsgaard

23 August 2008	HIK	2–3	Vanløse IF	Gentofte
15:00 CEST	Kirk 29'; Jensen 46'		Andersen 68'; Thorsvang 79'; Krog 89'	Stadium: Gentofte Stadion; Referee: Darko Haramija

23 August 2008	Allerød FK	0–3	FC Amager	Allerød
15:30 CEST			Nielsen 4'; Wichmann 20', 88'	Stadium: Skovvang Stadion; Attendance: 27; Referee: Thomas Lautrup Thorgaard

24 August 2008	Nordvest FC	3–0	Glostrup FK	Holbæk
13:00 CEST				Stadium: Holbæk Stadion; Referee: Philip Gojko Pilipovic

24 August 2008	B73 Slagelse	0–10	BK Frem	Slagelse
15:00 CEST			Palka 18'; Jürgensen 19', 31'; Olsen 27'; Weibel 29', 63'; Simonsen 40'; Andersen 50', 73'; Mikkelsen 71'	Stadium: Stadion Vest; Referee: John Gantfeldt

24 August 2008	AB	4–0	FC Roskilde	Copenhagen
15:00 CEST	Andersen 5'; Hübertz 15'; Boysen 22'; Rønne 86'			Stadium: Gladsaxe Stadion; Attendance: 633; Referee: Henrik Priegel

24 August 2008	BK Frem Sakskøbing	1–7	Brøndby IF	Sakskøbing
17:30 CEST	Lohse 44'		Kristiansen 16'; Madsen 31', 42' (pen.), 62'; Mortensen 50', 87'; Howard 90'	Stadium: Sakskøbing Stadion; Attendance: 2,147; Referee: Lars Skibild Jensen

== Third round ==
The winners from the Second Round progressed to the Third Round. Four additional teams, placed first to fourth in the 2007–08 Superliga, contested in this round.

The draw for this round was held at Ekstra Bladet's premises at The City Hall Square in Copenhagen. The matches were played between 26 and 29 September 2008.

26 September 2008	Brønshøj BK	2–3 (a.e.t.)	AaB	Copenhagen
16:30 CEST	Frost 36'; Petersen 57'		Augustinussen 18'; Saganowski 85'; Risgård 99'	Stadium: Tingbjerg Idrætspark; Referee: Emil Laursen

26 September 2008	Viborg FF	1–2	AC Horsens	Viborg
18:30 CEST	Pedersen 28'		Eckersley 17'; Friis 87'	Stadium: Viborg Stadion; Attendance: 2,707; Referee: Michael Svendsen

27 September 2008	FC Fredericia	2–2 (a.e.t.) (6–5 p)	Herfølge BK	Fredericia
13:30 CEST	Smedegaard 62'; Fakkenor 90'		Ake 11'; Rynell 51'	Stadium: Fredericia Ny Stadion; Attendance: 316; Referee: Michael Tykgaard
	Penalties
	Johasen (penalty scored); Nielsen (penalty scored); Smedegaard (penalty scored); Henriksen (penalty scored); Haysen (penalty scored); Philipp (penalty scored)		(penalty scored) Rynell; (penalty scored) Ismael; (penalty scored) Kronborg; (penalty scored) Sørensen; (penalty scored) Funch; (penalty missed) Christoffersen

27 September 2008	Varde IF	0–3	Lyngby Boldklub	Varde
15:00 CEST			Christiansen 4'; Timm 6'; Wihlborg 23'	Stadium: Sydbank Stadion; Attendance: 251; Referee: Heine Sørensen

27 September 2008	FC Vestsjælland	0–4	F.C. Copenhagen	Slagelse
17:00 CEST			Kvist 56'; Júnior 67' (pen.); Aílton 84', 88'	Stadium: Slagelse Stadion; Attendance: 2,000; Referee: Anders Hermansen

28 September 2008	BK Frem	0–6	FC Nordsjælland	Copenhagen
13:00 CEST			Fetai 2', 23'; Pedersen 8'; Krølle 15'; Dahl 32'; Kildentoft 60'	Stadium: Valby Idrætspark; Attendance: 879; Referee: Lars Skibild Jensen

28 September 2008	Hvidovre IF	3–1 (a.e.t.)	Vejle Boldklub	Copenhagen
13:00 CEST	Boateng 53'; Bech 96'; Sørensen 112'		El Banna 43'	Stadium: Hvidovre Stadion; Referee: Dario Haramija

28 September 2008	BK Avarta	1–2	AGF	Copenhagen
13:00 CEST	Fosgaard 32'		Graulund 12'; Rafael 63'	Stadium: Espelundens Idrætspark; Referee: Michael Johansen

28 September 2008	Nordvest FC	1–0	SønderjyskE	Holbæk
13:00 CEST	Keskin 60'			Stadium: Holbæk Stadion; Referee: Henrik Priegel

28 September 2008	Blokhus FC	0–2	Randers FC	Pandrup
13:30 CEST			Buval 28'; Nguyen 88'	Stadium: Jetsmark Stadion; Referee: Henrik Nystrup Kragh

28 September 2008	Hobro IK	0–3	Næstved BK	Hobro
15:00 CEST			Madsen 3' (pen.), 45' (pen.); Johansen 25'	Stadium: Hobro Stadion; Referee: Mads-Kristoffer Kristoffersen

28 September 2008	FC Amager	1–3	OB	Copenhagen
15:00 CEST	Nielsen 67'		Utaka 37'; Djiby Fall 66'; Ruud 81'	Stadium: Sundby Idrætspark; Attendance: 1,441; Referee: Jesper Bæk Overgaard

28 September 2008	Skive IK	2–1	Esbjerg fB	Skive
15:00 CEST	Dalgaard 31', 66'		Lange 62'	Stadium: Skive Stadion; Attendance: 850; Referee: Michael Svendsen

28 September 2008	Holstebro BK	1–1 (a.e.t.) (4–2 p)	Vanløse IF	Holstebro
15:00 CEST	Kristensen 40' (pen.)		Thorsvang 6'	Stadium: Holstebro Idrætspark; Referee: Jakob Kehlet

28 September 2008	FC Fyn	2–3	Brøndby IF	Brøndby
17:30 CEST	Fagerberg 87'; Fønss 90+1'		Lorentzen 30', 59'; Krohn-Dehli 89'	Stadium: Brøndby Stadion; Attendance: 3,071; Referee: Peter Rasmussen

29 September 2008	AB	1–0	FC Midtjylland	Copenhagen
19:00 CEST	Darlie 20'			Stadium: Gladsaxe Stadion; Attendance: 1,571; Referee: Emil Laursen

== Fourth round ==
The winners from the Third Round progressed to the Fourth Round.

The draw for this was held at Ekstra Bladet's premises at The City Hall Square in Copenhagen. The matches were played around 29 October 2008.

29 October 2008	FC Fredericia	0–1	AaB	Fredericia
18:15 CET			Due 8'	Stadium: Fredericia Ny Stadion; Attendance: 1,470; Referee: Peter Rasmussen

29 October 2008	Nordvest FC	1–1 (a.e.t.) (4–2 p)	AB	Holbæk
19:00 CET	Lundberg 90'		Hübertz 90'	Stadium: Holbæk Stadion; Attendance: 708; Referee: Anders Hermansen
	Penalties
	Hülz (penalty scored); Lysgaard (penalty scored); Jensen (penalty scored); Aslan (penalty scored)		(penalty missed) Heinze; (penalty scored) Lykke; (penalty scored) Sørensen; (penalty missed) Jørgensen

29 October 2008	Lyngby BK	5–2	Skive IK	Kongens Lyngby
19:00 CET	Aabech 5'; Lund 7', 45'; Melchiorsen 28'; Gundersen 76'		Lawal 48'; Møller 83'	Stadium: Lyngby Stadion; Attendance: 506; Referee: Henrik Priegel

29 October 2008	Hvidovre IF	3–3 (a.e.t.) (4–2 p)	FC Nordsjælland	Hvidovre
19:00 CET	Cieslewicz 17'; Clausen 72', 100'		Fetai 15'; Kildentoft 82'; Pedersen 108'	Stadium: Hvidovre Stadion; Attendance: 855; Referee: Michael Johansen

29 October 2008	AC Horsens	3–2	Randers FC	Horsens
19:00 CET	Gilberto 25'; Mayasi 74'; Kortegaard 86'		Nguyen 29'; Nygaard 57'	Stadium: Casa Arena Horsens; Attendance: 1,248; Referee: Nicolai Vollquartz

29 October 2008	OB	1–0	AGF	Odense
20:15 CET	Absalonsen 88'			Stadium: Fionia Park; Attendance: 4,942; Referee: Henning Jensen

30 October 2008	Næstved BK	0–3	F.C. Copenhagen	Næstved
18:15 CET			Aílton 19', 77'; Júnior 87'	Stadium: Næstved Stadion; Attendance: 3,412; Referee: Emil Laursen

30 October 2008	Holstebro BK	1–2	Brøndby IF	Holstebro
20:15 CET	Kristensen 37'		Jallow 66', 68'	Stadium: Holstebro Idrætspark; Attendance: 3,386; Referee: Henrik Nystrup Kragh

== Quarter-finals ==
The draw for the Fifth Round was held at Ekstra Bladet's premises at The City Hall Square in Copenhagen. The matches were played on 12 November 2008.

12 November 2008	Lyngby BK	0–0 (a.e.t.) (2–4 p)	F.C. Copenhagen	Kongens Lyngby
18:00 CET				Stadium: Lyngby Stadion; Attendance: 2,421; Referee: Anders Hermansen
	Penalties
	Melchiorsen (penalty scored); Lund Nielsen (penalty missed); Aabech (penalty scored); Hamalainen (penalty missed)		(penalty scored) Nordstrand; (penalty scored) Santin; (penalty scored) Sionko; (penalty missed) Nørregaard; (penalty scored) Hutchinson

12 November 2008	Nordvest FC	2–1	AC Horsens	Holbæk
19:00 CET	Keskin 34'; Rama 89'		Macena 90'	Stadium: Holbæk Stadion; Referee: Jesper Bæk Overgaard

12 November 2008	FC Nordsjælland	1–2	AaB	Farum
19:00 CET	Bernburg 24'		Jakobsen 45' (pen.); Cacá 84'	Stadium: Farum Park; Referee: Lars Christoffersen

12 November 2008	OB	0–1	Brøndby IF	Odense
20:00 CET			Farnerud 89'	Stadium: Fionia Park; Attendance: 6,537; Referee: Michael Svendsen

== Semi-finals ==
The semifinals will be played on home and away basis. The first legs were played on 15 and 16 April and second on 29 April 2009.

=== First legs ===
15 April 2009	Brøndby IF	3–3	AaB	Brøndby
18:00 CEST	Randrup 10', 37'; Kristiansen 66'		Risgård 22'; Shelton 63'; Johansson 77'	Stadium: Brøndby Stadion; Attendance: 8,094; Referee: Nicolai Vollquartz

16 April 2009	Nordvest FC	0–4	F.C. Copenhagen	Holbæk
18:30 CEST			Jensen 33'; Nørregaard 53'; N'Doye 83', 90'	Stadium: Holbæk Stadion; Attendance: 6,132; Referee: Michael Svendsen

=== Second leg ===
28 April 2009	F.C. Copenhagen	2–1 (6–1 agg.)	Nordvest FC	Copenhagen
18:00 CEST	N'Doye 18'; Nordstrand 56'		Håkansson 1'	Stadium: Parken Stadium; Attendance: 6,916; Referee: Anders Hermansen

29 April 2009	AaB	1–1 (4–4 (a) agg.)	Brøndby IF	Aalborg
18:00 CEST	Cacá 60'		Duncan 67'	Stadium: Energi Nord Arena; Attendance: 12,068; Referee: Michael Svendsen

== Final ==
The final was held at Parken Stadium on 21 May 2009.

21 May 2009
15:00 CEST

AaB	0–1	F.C. Copenhagen
	Report	Kvist 31'

Parken Stadium, Copenhagen
Attendance: 29,249
Referee: Peter Rasmussen
