= 2010–11 Danish Cup =

DBU Pokalen (The DBU Cup)

Tournament details
- Country: Denmark

Final positions
- Champions: FC Nordsjælland
- Runners-up: FC Midtjylland

The 2010–11 Danish Cup was the 57th season of the Danish football cup competition. For the third year, the sponsor of the competition was Ekstra Bladet, a daily newspaper, who signed a 3-year contract with the Danish Football Association (DBU) in 2008, making the official name Ekstra Bladet Cup 2010–11.

The competition opened on 9 August 2010 with the first round and concluded on 22 May 2011 with the final at the Parken Stadium.

== First round ==
In this round entered 96 teams. There were 48 matches in the First Round, taking place between 9 and 17 August 2010.

Tie no	Home team	Score	Away team
1	Egen UI	0–1	BK Marienlyst
2	Frederikshavn fI	1–4	Hobro IK
3	Hirtshals BK	3–1	Birkelse IF
4	Ringkøbing IF	2–1	Tjørring IF
5	Aarhus Fremad	1–2	Brabrand IF
6	Viborg Søndermarken IK	0–2	Skive IK
7	Bredstrup-Pjedsted IF	0–9	Kolding FC
8	KFUM's BK Odense	0–10	Varde IF
9	Ringe BK	0–4	Aabenraa BK
10	DSIO Odense	1–5	FC Fyn
11	BK Frem Sakskøbing	2–5	Næstved BK
12	Herlufsholm GF	0–1	Lolland-Falster Alliancen
13	Elite 3000 Fodbold	4–3	Akademisk Boldklub
14	Gentofte-Vangede IF	0–3	Nordvest FC
15	Helsinge fB	1–6	Hellerup IK
16	Brønshøj BK	7–1	Allerød FK
17	Frederiksberg Alliancen 2000	3–4	BK Fremad Valby
18	Avedøre IF	4–1	BK Søllerød-Vedbæk
19	IF Lyseng	0–1	IK Skovbakken
20	Aars IK	0–2	Blokhus FC
21	Gladsaxe-Hero BK	5–3	Boldklubben 1973 Herlev
22	Stenløse BK	2–1	BK Avarta
23	Virum-Sorgenfri BK	1–4	Vanløse IF
24	Fremad Amager	0–1	Hvidovre IF

Tie no	Home team	Score	Away team
25	AB Tårnby	0–1	NB Bornholm
26	Ledøje-Smørum Fodbold	1–3	Svebølle B&IF
27	Herlev IF	0–4	Boldklubben 1908
28	Frederiksberg BK	2–1	BK Skjold
29	IF Skjold Birkerød	3–2	FC Roskilde
30	Døllefjelde-Musse	0–12	FC Vestsjælland
31	FC Broby	5–6	ØB
32	Næsby BK	2–3	FC Fredericia
33	Funder GF	2–6	Viby IF
34	Lemvig GF	2–4	Odder IGF
35	Aalborg Chang	1–3	Thisted FC
36	Skagen IK	1–4	FC Hjørring
37	Bjerringbro IF	1–6	FC Skanderborg
38	Kjellerup	0–2	Viborg FF
39	Otterup B&IK	2–3	Vejle Boldklub
40	Kværndrup BK	2–4	FC Svendborg
41	Nakskov BK	0–5	HB Køge
42	Kastrup BK	5–3	Greve Fodbold
43	Glostrup FK	0–2	Boldklubben af 1893
44	Holstebro BK	1–4	Aarhus Gymnastikforening
45	Grindsted GIF	2–4	Lystrup IF
46	Bolbro G&IF	6–4	Vinding SF
47	Jægersborg BK	3–0	Boldklubben Frem
48	Tuse IF	3–2	Værløse BK

== Second round ==
The clubs who placed 5–10 in the 2009–10 Superliga – AaB, Midtjylland, Nordsjælland, Silkeborg, SønderjyskE and Randers – as well as the top two clubs from the 2009–10 First Division – Horsens and Lyngby – received a bye into the second round. These matches were played from 24 to 26 August 2010.

Tie no	Home team	Score	Away team
49	NB Bornholm	0–1	Hellerup IK
50	Tuse IF	0–2	Boldklubben af 1893
51	IF Skjold Birkerød	1–4	Brønshøj BK
52	Blokhus FC	0–3	AaB
53	Hirtshals BK	2–4	Skive IK
54	Bolbro G&IF	0–5	FC Hjørring
55	Ringkøbing IF	0–3	Viborg FF
56	ØB	1–3	Thisted FC
57	Lystrup IF	0–5	Varde IF
58	Aabenraa BK	1–4	Hobro IK
59	BK Marienlyst	2–1	Boldklubben 1908
60	Svebølle B&IF	2–4	HB Køge
61	Avedøre IF	3–1 (a.e.t.)	Lolland-Falster Alliancen
62	Gladsaxe-Hero BK	0–1	Næstved BK

Tie no	Home team	Score	Away team
63	Viby IF	0–0 (3–2 p)	Kolding FC
64	Odder IGF	0–1	Aarhus Gymnastikforening
65	IK Skovbakken	1–4	Randers
66	Brabrand IF	1–4	Horsens
67	Elite 3000 Fodbold	1–3	FC Vestsjælland
68	Kastrup BK	2–2 (4–3 p)	Stenløse BK
69	Jægersborg BK	0–1	Hvidovre IF
70	BK Fremad Valby	2–5	Nordvest FC
71	Frederiksberg BK	2–3 (a.e.t.)	FC Svendborg
72	FC Fredericia	4–0	SønderjyskE
73	FC Fyn	0–1	Lyngby
74	Vejle Boldklub	2–4 (a.e.t.)	Silkeborg
75	FC Skanderborg	1–3	Midtjylland
76	Vanløse IF	0–5	Nordsjælland

== Third round ==
The top four teams from the 2008–09 Superliga – Copenhagen, OB, Brøndby and Esbjerg – received a bye into the third round. These matches took place on 22, 23 and 29 September 2010.

Team 1	Score	Team 2
B.93	0–5	Silkeborg
Viby	1–4	Copenhagen
Hobro	0–1	Viborg
Brønshøj	0–1	Hvidovre
Varde	4–2	Brøndby
Avedøre	2–3	Midtjylland
Svendborg	0–3	Esbjerg
Marienlyst	0–2	OB
Kastrup	1–2	Lyngby
Nordvest	1–5	Randers
Vestsjælland	2–6	Horsens
Næstved	0–1	AaB
AGF	6–3	Skive
Hellerup	1–2	Fredericia
Thisted	1–3	HB Køge
Hjørring	0–1	Nordsjælland

== Fourth round ==
The sixteen winners in Round 3 took part in Round 4. The draw occurred on 25 September 2010. The matches took place between 26 and 28 October 2010.

Team 1	Score	Team 2
Viborg	1–1 (4–5 p)	AaB
Copenhagen	2–4	Horsens
Esbjerg	2–0	Silkeborg
OB	2–3	Nordsjælland
HB Køge	0–4	Midtjylland
Fredericia	1–2	Randers
Hvidovre	2–2 (4–5 p)	Lyngby
Varde	0–1	AGF

== Quarter-finals ==
The eight winners from the previous round competed in this round. These matches took place between 9 and 11 November 2010.

9 November 2010	AaB	0–2	Esbjerg fB	Aalborg
19:00		Report	Lange 83'; Mehl 85'	Stadium: Energi Nord Arena; Referee: Peter Rasmussen

10 November 2010	AGF Aarhus	0–1	FC Midtjylland	Aarhus
18:30		Report	Igboun 40'	Stadium: Atletion; Referee: Henrik Nystrup Kragh

11 November 2010	Randers FC	3–0	Lyngby BK	Randers
18:00	Sane 1', 87'; Cramer 83'	Report		Stadium: Essex Park Randers; Referee: Nicolai Vollquartz

11 November 2010	AC Horsens	0–1	FC Nordsjælland	Horsens
20:00		Report	Kildentoft 16'	Stadium: CASA Arena Horsens; Referee: Thomas Vejlgaard

== Semi-finals ==
The four winners from the Quarter Finals will compete in this round. This round will be played as a two-legged tie. The legs will be played on 27 April and 4 May 2011.

Team 1	Agg.	Team 2	1st leg	2nd leg
FC Nordsjælland	1–0	Randers FC	1–0	0–0
FC Midtjylland	3–3 (5–4 p)	Esbjerg fB	1–2	2–1

=== First leg ===
27 April 2011	FC Midtjylland	1–2	Esbjerg fB	Herning
18:00	Hvilsom 68'	Report	Janssen 28'; Lange 53' (pen.)	Stadium: MCH Arena; Referee: Jakob Kehlet

28 April 2011	FC Nordsjælland	1–0	Randers FC	Farum
18:00	Lawan 31'	Report		Stadium: Farum Park; Referee: Anders Hermansen

=== Second leg ===
4 May 2011	Randers FC	0–0 (0–1 agg.)	FC Nordsjælland	Randers
18:00				Stadium: Essex Park Randers; Referee: Henning Jensen

5 May 2011	Esbjerg fB	1–2 (a.e.t.) (3–3 agg.) (4–5 p)	FC Midtjylland	Esbjerg
18:00	Bechmann Timm 90+1'		Thygesen 58'; Hassan 60'	Stadium: Blue Water Arena; Referee: Michael Svendsen
	Penalties
	Lange (penalty scored); Karlsen (penalty scored); Vendelbo (penalty scored); Bechmann Timm (penalty scored); Conboy (penalty missed)		(penalty scored) Bak Nielsen; (penalty scored) Juelsgård Kristensen; (penalty scored) Albæk; (penalty scored) Igboun; (penalty scored) Poulsen

== Final ==
The final was played on 22 May 2011.

22 May 2011
18:45 CEST (UTC+02)

FC Nordsjælland	3–2	FC Midtjylland
Lawan 16', 54'; Christensen 90+2'		Thygesen 37', 72'

Parken, Copenhagen
Attendance: 8,863
Referee: Claus Bo Larsen
