= List of Danish football transfers summer 2009 =

This is a list of Danish football transfers for the 2009 summer transfer window. Only moves featuring at least one Danish Superliga club are listed.

The Danish Superliga 2008–09 season ended on May 31(2009), with the Danish Superliga 2009–10 season starting on July 18(2009). The summer transfer window opened on 1 July 2009, although a few transfers took place prior to that date; including carry-overs from the winter 2008–09 transfer window. The window closed at midnight on 31 August 2009.

== Transfers ==
Date	Name	Nat	Moving from	Moving to	Fee
2009-01-15^{1}	Emil Farver	DEN	B.93	Silkeborg	Undisclosed
2009-01-16^{1}	Jan Frederiksen	DNK	Randers	Brøndby	Free
2009-01-28^{1}	Kevin Bechmann Timm	DNK	Copenhagen	Esbjerg	Free
2009-04-08^{1}	Mikael Nilsson	SWE	(Greece) Panathinaikos	Brøndby	Free
2009-04-27^{1}	Thomas Augustinussen	DNK	AaB	(Austria) Red Bull Salzburg	Undisclosed
2009-05-18^{1}	Paul Jatta	GAM	(The Gambia) Banjul Hawks	Brøndby	Undisclosed
2009-05-25^{1}	Danni König	DNK	Brønshøj	Randers	Free
2009-06-05	Thomas Gaardsøe	DNK	Unattached	AaB	Free
2009-06-08^{1}	Tim Janssen	NED	(Netherlands) Nijmegen	Esbjerg	Undisclosed
2009-06-09^{1}	Kasper Risgård	DNK	AaB	(Germany) Arminia Bielefeld	Free
2009-06-10^{1}	Louay Chanko	SYR	(Sweden) Hammarby	AaB	Undisclosed
2009-06-11^{1}	Steffen Ernemann	DNK	Silkeborg	(Belgium) Zulte Waregem	Free
2009-06-11^{1}	Kian Christensen	DNK	Randers	Hobro	Free
2009-06-11^{1}	Peter Nymann	DNK	OB	Esbjerg	Free
2009-06-12^{1}	Allan K. Jepsen	DNK	(Norway) Vålerenga	Randers	Undisclosed
2009-06-15^{1}	Jesper Bech	DNK	Esbjerg	Silkeborg	Free
2009-06-16^{1}	Kasper Lorentzen	DNK	Brøndby	Randers	Free
2009-06-18^{1}	Frank Hansen	DNK	Esbjerg	Silkeborg	Free
2009-06-18^{1}	Siyabonga Nomvethe	RSA	AaB	(South Africa) Moroka Swallows	Free
2009-06-18^{1}	Emil Ousager	DNK	Randers	OB	Free
2009-06-19^{1}	Timmi Johansen	DNK	(Netherlands) Heerenveen	OB	Free
2009-06-19^{1}	Carsten Fredgaard	DEN	Randers	AB	Free
2009-06-23^{1}	Alexander Fischer	DNK	Lyngby	Randers	Free
2009-06-24	Arek Onyszko	POL	OB	Unattached	Released
2009-06-25^{1}	Andreas Dahl	SWE	Nordsjælland	(Sweden) Hammarby	Undisclosed
2009-06-26^{1}	Michael Nørgaard	DEN	Silkeborg	Fyn	Free
2009-06-30^{1}	Kenneth Emil Petersen	DNK	Horsens	AaB	Undisclosed
2009-07-01	Remco van der Schaaf	NLD	Brøndby	(England) Burnley	Loan return
2009-07-01	Nicklas Svendsen	DNK	Frem	Køge	Free
2009-07-01	John Mosquera	COL	SønderjyskE	(Germany) Werder Bremen	Loan return
2009-07-01	Ole Budtz	DNK	AGF	Unattached	End of contract
2009-07-01	Morten Beck Andersen	DNK	AGF	Unattached	End of contract
2009-07-01	Thiago Pinto Borges	BRA	Esbjerg	Unattached	End of contract
2009-07-01	Samel Sabanovic	MNE	Esbjerg	(Switzerland) Grasshoppers	Loan return
2009-07-01	Jacob Neestrup	DEN	Copenhagen	Unattached	End of contract
2009-07-01	José Junior	BRA	Nordsjælland	Copenhagen	Loan return
2009-07-01	Baba Collins	GHA	Vejle	Midtjylland	Loan return
2009-07-01	Bo Storm	DEN	Nordsjælland	Unattached	End of contract
2009-07-01	Mohammed Abdalas	DEN	Nordsjælland	Unattached	End of contract
2009-07-01	Lasse Rostholm	DEN	Køge	Unattached	End of contract
2009-07-01	Steen Träger	DEN	Køge	Unattached	End of contract
2009-07-01	Matti Lund Nielsen	DEN	Lyngby	OB	Loan return
2009-07-01	Morten Bisgaard	DEN	OB	Retirement	Out of contract
2009-07-01	David Preece	ENG	OB	Retirement	Out of contract
2009-07-01	Tiago Targino	POR	Randers	Unattached	End of contract
2009-07-01	Bédi Buval	FRA	Randers	Unattached	End of contract
2009-07-01	Jeppe Brandrup	DEN	Silkeborg	Unattached	Out of contract
2009-07-01	Thomas Olsen	DEN	Silkeborg	Unattached	End of contract
2009-07-01	Stefan Schmidt	DEN	Silkeborg	Unattached	Released
2009-07-01	Mikkel Buur Simonsen	DEN	Silkeborg	Unattached	End of contract
2009-07-01	Steve Olfers	NLD	AaB	Unattached	End of contract
2009-07-01	Luton Shelton	JAM	AaB	(Norway) Vålerenga	Loan return
2009-07-03	Arthur Sorin	FRA	AGF	(France) Sedan	Loan
2009-07-03	Arek Onyszko	POL	Unattached	Midtjylland	Free
2009-07-06	Lasse Heinze	DNK	Midtjylland	Silkeborg	Loan
2009-07-06	Cacá	BRA	AaB	OB	Undisclosed
2009-07-06	Srđan Radonjić	MNE	OB	(Montenegro) Mogren	Undisclosed
2009-07-09	Rasmus Würtz	DNK	Copenhagen	AaB	Undisclosed
2009-07-09	Daniel Fredheim Holm	NOR	(Norway) Vålerenga	AaB	Undisclosed
2009-07-13	Anders Lindegaard	DEN	(Norway) Ålesund	OB	Loan return
2009-07-14	Abbas Hassan	SWE	(Sweden) Elfsborg	AaB	Loan
2009-07-14	Kenneth Stenild	DNK	AaB	Horsens	Undisclosed
2009-07-14	Rúrik Gíslason	ISL	Viborg	OB	Undisclosed
2009-07-14	Jacob Berthelsen	DNK	Brøndby	AB	Loan
2009-07-15	David Williams	AUS	Brøndby	(Australia) North Queensland Fury	Loan
2009-07-16	Rawez Lawan	SWE	Horsens	Nordsjælland	Undisclosed
2009-07-20	Kári Arnason	ISL	AGF	(England) Plymouth Argyle	Free
2009-07-22	Jakob Ahlmann Nielsen	DNK	Midtjylland	AaB	Undisclosed
2009-07-28	Renato Arapi	ALB	Silkeborg	Unattached	Released
2009-07-29	Johnny Lundberg	SWE	Nordsjælland	(Sweden) Halmstad	Undisclosed
2009-07-29	Ismael Miranda	BRA	Køge	Unattached	Released
2009-07-30	Andreas Granskov	DNK	Unattached	Nordsjælland	Free
2009-08-05	Christian Nielsen	DEN	Nordsjælland	Unattached	Released
2009-08-05	Martin Bernburg	DEN	Nordsjælland	Brøndby	Undisclosed
2009-08-13	Nathan Coe	AUS	Copenhagen	Randers	Undisclosed
2009-08-17	Roy Carroll	NIR	(England) Derby	OB	Undisclosed
2009-08-18	Tobias Mikkelsen	DEN	Brøndby	Nordsjælland	Undisclosed
2009-08-19	Daniel Wass	DEN	Brøndby	Fredrikstad	Loan
2009-08-19	José Junior	BRA	Copenhagen	Randers	Loan
2009-08-21	Jesper Blicher	DNK	AGF	Næstved	Loan
2009-08-25	Joakim Steiness	DEN	Esbjerg	FC Fyn	Undisclosed
2009-08-26	Ayinde Lawal	GHA	Midtjylland	Skive	Undisclosed
2009-08-29	Anders Lindegaard	DEN	OB	(Norway) Ålesund	Undisclosed
2009-08-29	Thomas Enevoldsen	DEN	AaB	(Netherlands) Groningen	DKK9,300,000
2009-08-30	Dino Avdic	SWE	(Sweden) Ängelholm	Køge	Undisclosed
2009-08-30	Andrew Ornoch	CAN	Esbjerg	(Netherlands) Heracles	Free
2009-08-31	Morten Nordstrand	DEN	Copenhagen	(Netherlands) Groningen	Loan
2009-08-31	Rune Pedersen	DEN	Lyngby	OB	Loan
2009-08-31	Esben Hansen	DEN	OB	Randers	Loan
2009-09-01	Andreas Granskov	DNK	Nordsjælland	AB	Loan
2009-09-01	Anders Nielsen	DNK	Næstved	AGF	Undisclosed
2009-09-01	Stefan Hansen	DEN	Hvidovre	Køge	Undisclosed
2009-09-01	Patrick Mortensen	DEN	Brøndby	Lyngby	Loan
2009-09-01	Nicolaj Agger	DEN	Brøndby	SønderjyskE	Loan
2009-09-01	Rune Nilssen	NOR	(Norway) Start	Copenhagen	Loan
2009-09-01	Maros Klimpl	SVK	Midtjylland	(Scotland) Motherwell	Loan
2009-09-01	Sekou Oliseh	NGR	Midtjylland	(Russia) CSKA Moscow	Loan
2009-09-01	Martin Albrechtsen	DEN	(England) Derby County	Midtjylland	Undisclosed
2009-09-01	Ken Ilsø	DEN	SønderjyskE	Midtjylland	Undisclosed
2009-09-01	Poul Hübertz	DEN	AB	Midtjylland	Undisclosed
2009-09-01	Andreas Bjelland	DEN	Lyngby	Nordsjælland	Undisclosed
2009-09-01	Pierre Bengtsson	SWE	(Sweden) AIK	Nordsjælland	Undisclosed
2009-09-01	Issey Nakajima-Farran	CAN	Nordsjælland	Horsens	Undisclosed
2009-09-01	Magnus Tappert	SWE	Køge	Unattached	Released
2009-09-01	Morten Avnskjold	DEN	SønderjyskE	Roskilde	Free
2009-09-01	Dennis Marshall	CRC	(Costa Rica) Herediano	AaB	Undisclosed

== Notes ==
- ^1 Player will officially join his new club on 1 July 2009.
