= 2012–13 Danish Cup =

DBU Pokalen (The DBU Cup)

Tournament details
- Country: Denmark

Final positions
- Champions: Esbjerg fB
- Runners-up: Randers FC

The 2012–13 Danish Cup was the 59th season of the Danish Cup competition. It was the second season since its rebranding as the DBU Pokalen (The DBU Cup). The winner of the competition qualified for the play-off round of the 2013–14 UEFA Europa League.

== Overview ==
Round	Matches	Clubs remaining	Clubs involved	Winners from previous round	New entries this round	Teams entering at this round
First round 14-16, 22 August 2012	48	108	96	48^{a}	48	First Division (16 clubs), Second Divisions (32 clubs), Regional qualification (48 clubs)
Second round 28–29 August, 4, 11–12 September 2012	28	60	56	48	8	Superliga (8 clubs – places 5-10 from 2011–12 Superliga and places 1-2 from 2011–12 1st Division)
Third round 25–26 September, 3, 24 October 2012	16	32	32	28	4	Superliga (4 clubs – places 1–4)
Fourth round 31 October, 1, 7–8 November 2012	8	16	16	16	0	
Quarter-finals	4	8	8	8	0	
Semi-finals	2	4	4	4	0	
Final	1	2	2	2	0	

From regional qualification

== First round ==
96 teams were drawn into the first round - 16 teams from the First Division, 32 teams from the Second Divisions and 48 clubs from regional qualification. Matches were played on 14-16 and 22 August 2012.

Home team	Score	Away team
CSC	1–3	AB Tårnby
Østerbro	0–1	NB Bornholm
Gug Boldklub	0–2	Lindholm IF
Hadsund	3–4	FC Hjørring
IK Aalborg Freja	6–2	Frederikshavn fI
Borbjerg GU	1–4	Lystrup IF
DGL 2000	1–3	Aarhus Fremad
Vatanspor	2–3	Kjellerup IF
Allesø GF	0–3	BK Marienlyst
Egebjerg IF	0–3	FC Sønderborg
Morud IF	1–0	Marstal IF/Rise SIF
Søhus Stige	0–2	Varde IF
Fløng/Hedehusene	0–1	IF Føroyar
Lundtofte	0–6	Frederikssund IK
Avedøre IF	5–4	B 1908
BSV	3–1	FC Roskilde
Nakskov BK	0–9	HB Køge
Sydalliancen	3–2	Frem Sakskøbing
Tuse IF	1–4	Herlufsholm GF
Svebølle BI	5–2	Næsby BK
B 93	4–0	BK Avarta
LFA	1–5	FC Vestsjælland
FC Amager	2–7	HIK
Jægersborg BK	1–4	Hvidovre IF

Home team	Score	Away team
Nordvestmors BK	1–4	Skive IK
Hjørring Frem	0–9	Blokhus FC
Odder IGF	1–5	Viborg FF
FC Djursland	2–3	Skovbakken IK
Ringkøbing IF	3–2	Brabrand IF
Tjørring IF	0–4	Viby IF
Aalborg Chang	3–0	FC Fredericia
Esbjerg IF 92	3–2	FC Fyn
Sædding/Guldager IF	0–1	FC Svendborg
Tved BK	0–5	Aarup BK
Ubberud IF	0–13	Vejle Boldklub Kolding
FC Sydvest 05	3–4	Otterup B&IK
Femhøj IF	0–1	Vanløse IF
Vallensbæk IF	1–0	Allerød FK
Virum-Sorgenfri BK	0–2	Rishøj BK
FC Helsingør	3–0	Herlev IF
IF Skjold Birkerød	2–4	SC Egedal
Kalundborg GB	1–1 (1–2 p)	Nordvest FC
Ringsted IF	1–4	Næstved BK
Thisted FC	2–3	Hobro IK
BGA	1–6	Lyngby
BK Skjold	2–0	AB
BK Heimdal	4–10	Ledøje-Smørum
Fremad Amager	1–4	Brønshøj BK

== Second round ==
The teams who finished in positions 5–10 in last season's Superliga and the two promoted teams from last season's First Division entered the competition in the second round. The matches were played on 28–29 August, 4, 11–12 September.

Home team	Score	Away team
Hobro IK	1–4	SønderjyskE
Ringkøbing IF	1–2	Aarhus Fremad
Esbjerg IF 92	3–3 (4–2 p)	Lindholm IF
BK Marienlyst	2–3	Rishøj BK
Ledøje-Smørum	0–1	Hvidovre IF
Nordvest FC	1–2	Brøndby
NB Bornholm	0–1	OB
Herlufsholm GF	0–3	Brønshøj BK
IK Aalborg Freja	0–1	Randers
FC Sønderborg	1–2	FC Fredericia
Kjellerup IF	1–7	FC Hjørring
Viby IF	2–0	Skive IK
FC Helsingør	4–4 (7–8 p)	FC Vestsjælland
Frederikssund IK	0–3	BSV

Home team	Score	Away team
Sydalliancen	0–4	Lyngby
Avedøre IF	0–1	Næstved BK
AB Tårnby	1–7	HB Køge
Viborg FF	1–1 (10–11 p)	Esbjerg
FC Svendborg	0–2	Silkeborg IF
Lystrup IF	1–9	Blokhus FC
Morud IF	1–3	Otterup B&IK
Aarup BK	1–3	Vejle Boldklub Kolding
BK Skjold	0–2	Svebølle BI
Skovbakken IK	0–3	AaB
Vallensbæk IF	1–1 (5–6 p)	B 93
IF Føroyar	0–4	HIK
Varde IF	1–4	AGF

== Third round ==
The teams who finished in positions 1–4 in last season's Superliga entered the competition in the third round. The matches were played on 25–26 September, 3 and 24 October.

Home team	Score	Away team
Vanløse IF	1–0	BSV
Svebølle BI	1–3 (a.e.t.)	Nordsjælland
Næstved BK	1–2	Randers
Aarhus Fremad	0–3	AGF
Rishøj BK	0–1	Midtjylland
Viby IF	1–6	Lyngby
Blokhus FC	0–1	Silkeborg IF
B 93	0–3	Brøndby

Home team	Score	Away team
Hvidovre IF	3–7	OB
Vejle Boldklub Kolding	3–1	FC Vestsjælland
FC Fredericia	0–3	FC Copenhagen
Brønshøj BK	1–3	AaB
Otterup B&IK	2–3	AC Horsens
Esbjerg IF 92	0–3	Esbjerg
HIK	3–2	HB Køge
FC Hjørring	0–4	SønderjyskE

== Fourth round ==
The matches are being played on 31 October, 1, 7 and 8 November.

Team 1	Score	Team 2
SønderjyskE	0–3	FC Copenhagen
Vanløse IF	0–3	OB
Lyngby	3–2	AGF
Nordsjælland	2–3 (a.e.t.)	Midtjylland
Vejle Boldklub Kolding	0–1	Randers
HIK	0–4	AC Horsens
Brøndby	3–0	Silkeborg IF
Esbjerg	0–0 (4–2 p)	AaB

== Quarter-finals ==
28 November 2012	Lyngby	1–2	Esbjerg	Lyngby
19:00	Perdedaj 74'	Report	Fabricius 35'; Knudsen 47'	Stadium: Lyngby Stadion; Attendance: 1,092; Referee: Michael Johansen

28 November 2012	Brøndby	1–0 (a.e.t.)	FC Copenhagen	Copenhagen
20:30	Jensen 92'	Report		Stadium: Brøndby Stadion; Attendance: 13,652; Referee: Kenn Hansen

29 November 2012	Randers	2–1	Midtjylland	Randers
19:00	Schwartz 48'; Fischer 61'	Report	Andersson 43'	Stadium: AutoC Park Randers; Attendance: 3,704; Referee: Michael Tykgaard

5 December 2012	OB	2–4 (a.e.t.)	AC Horsens	Odense
17:45	Johansson 12'; Høegh 82'	Report	Bjerregaard 3'; Spelmann 5' (pen.), 112' (pen.); Kryger 98'	Stadium: TRE-FOR Park; Attendance: 2,442; Referee: Jakob Kehlet

== Semi-finals ==
Team 1	Agg.	Team 2	1st leg	2nd leg
Randers	4–2	AC Horsens	1–0	3–2
Brøndby	2–4	Esbjerg	1–1	1–3 (a.e.t.)

=== First leg ===
13 March 2013	Brøndby	1−1	Esbjerg	Copenhagen
18:15	J. Larsen 74' (pen.)	Report	Toutouh 33'	Stadium: Brøndby Stadion; Attendance: 5,127; Referee: Jakob Kehlet

10 April 2013	Randers	1−0	AC Horsens	Randers
18:00	Brock-Madsen 52'	Report		Stadium: AutoC Park Randers; Attendance: 6,178; Referee: Mads-Kristoffer Kristoffersen

=== Second leg ===
17 April 2013	AC Horsens	2–3 (2–4 agg.)	Randers	Horsens
18:15	Takyi 26'; Toft 30'	Report	Spelmann 29' (o.g.); Schwartz 56'; Boya 80'	Stadium: Forum Horsens Stadion; Attendance: 7,371; Referee: Michael Tykgaard

18 April 2013	Esbjerg	3–1 (a.e.t.) (4–2 agg.)	Brøndby	Esbjerg
20:30	Braithwaite 79', 103'; Lange 117'	Report	Rommedahl 22'	Stadium: Blue Water Arena; Attendance: 8,870; Referee: Henning Jensen

== Final ==
9 May 2013
15:00 CEST (UTC+02)

Randers FC	0–1	Esbjerg fB
	Report	Toutouh 55'

Parken, Copenhagen
Attendance: 26,194
Referee: Kenn Hansen
