= Jimmy Mayasi =

Danish footballer (born 1987)

Personal information
- Date of birth: June 6, 1987 (age 39)
- Place of birth: Silkeborg, Denmark
- Height: 1.83 m (6 ft 0 in)
- Position: Forward

Youth career
- Silkeborg

Senior career*
Years	Team	Apps	(Gls)
2007–2008	Silkeborg	20	(9)
2008–2011	Horsens	30	(5)
2011–2012	Skive	14	(1)
2012	Tarxien Rainbows	16	(4)
2012–2013	Brønshøj	3	(0)
2013	Hvidovre	0	(0)
2013–2014	BK Frem	15	(0)
2014–2015	Egedal	15	(13)
2015–2017	GVI		
2017	AB Tårnby		
2018	GVI		
2019–2020	VB 1968		
2021	Fremad Valby		
- * Club domestic league appearances and goals

Jimmy Mayasi (born June 6, 1987) is a Danish former professional football forward of Congolese origins.
