= 2013 Danish Cup final =

- Event: 2012–13 Danish Cup
Randers FC	Esbjerg fB
0	1
- Date: 9 May 2013
- Venue: Parken, Copenhagen
- Referee: Kenn Hansen
- Attendance: 26,194

The 2013 Danish Cup final was a football match that decided the winner of the 2012–13 Danish Cup. It was played on 9 May 2013 at 15:00 CEST.

== Route to the final ==
Randers FC				Esbjerg fB
Opponent	Result	Legs	Round	Opponent	Result	Legs
IK Aalborg Freja	1–0	1–0 away	Second round	Viborg FF	1–1 (11–10 p)	1–1 away
Næstved BK	2–1	2–1 away	Third round	Esbjerg IF 92	3–0	3–0 away
Vejle Boldklub Kolding	1–0	1–0 away	Fourth round	AaB	0–0 (4–2 p)	0–0 home
Midtjylland	2–1	2–1 home	Quarter-finals	Lyngby	2–1	2–1 away
AC Horsens	4–2	1–0 home; 3–2 away	Semi-finals	Brøndby	4–2	1–1 away; 3–1 home (a.e.t.)

== Match ==
9 May 2013
15:00 CEST (UTC+02)

Randers FC	0–1	Esbjerg fB
	Report	Toutouh 55'

Parken, Copenhagen
Attendance: 26,194
Referee: Kenn Hansen

Randers FC	Esbjerg fB

GK	1	(Denmark) David Ousted
RB	4	(Denmark) Johnny Thomsen
CB	13	(Denmark) Mads Fenger
CB	15	(Denmark) Chris Sørensen	(yellow card) 90'
LB	33	(Mali) Adama Tamboura	(yellow card) 90+4'
RM	17	(Denmark) Jonas Kamper	(yellow card) 52'
CM	3	(Denmark) Christian Keller (C)
CM	7	(Iceland) Elmar Bjarnason
LM	21	(Denmark) Alexander Fischer		(substituted off) 60'
CF	11	(Denmark) Ronnie Schwartz	(yellow card) 81'
CF	44	(Denmark) Nicolai Brock-Madsen		(substituted off) 72'
Substitutions:
GK	25	(Denmark) Peter Friis Jensen
DF	22	(Denmark) Jacob Dehn Andersen
MF	29	(Denmark) Jonas Borring		(substituted on) 60'
MF	8	(Netherlands) Lorenzo Davids
MF	19	(Denmark) Oliver Feldballe
FW	20	(Cameroon) Pierre Boya		(substituted on) 72'
FW	10	(United States) Charlie Davies
Manager:
(England) Colin Todd

GK	1	(Finland) Lukas Hradecky
RB	3	(Denmark) Peter Ankersen	(yellow card) 90'
CB	2	(Denmark) Kian Hansen
CB	4	(Germany) Davidson Drobo-Ampem
LB	23	(Denmark) Jonas Knudsen
RM	19	(Denmark) Jakob Ankersen
CM	6	(Norway) Magnus Lekven
CM	20	(Denmark) Hans Henrik Andreasen
LM	15	(Denmark) Youssef Toutouh		(substituted off) 70'
CF	32	(Denmark) Martin Braithwaite		(substituted off) 78'
CF	9	(Iceland) Arnór Smárason		(substituted off) 90+2'
Substitutions:
GK	30	(Denmark) Mathias Rosenørn
DF	24	(Denmark) Nicolai Høgh		(substituted on) 90+2'
MF	12	(Denmark) Sebastian Andersen		(substituted on) 70'
MF	7	(Denmark) Steffen Ernemann
MF	21	(Philippines) Jerry Lucena
MF	10	(Denmark) Emil Lyng		(substituted on) 78'
FW	11	(Denmark) Mikkel Agger
Manager:
(Denmark) Jess Thorup
