= Thomas Maale =

Danish footballer and coach (born 1974)

Personal information
- Full name: Thomas Ørdal Maale
- Date of birth: 22 October 1974 (age 52)
- Place of birth: Gentofte, Denmark
- Position: Forward

Team information
- Current team: BSF (ladys fitness coach)

Youth career
- 1980–1989: Skovlunde IF
- 1989: AB
- 1990–1991: Værløse BK
- 1991–1992: Lyngby BK

Senior career*
Years	Team	Apps	(Gls)
1992–1994	Lyngby BK	19	(0)
1994–1998	Ølstykke FC	120	(58)
1998–1999	B93	37	(6)
2000	Ølstykke FC		
2000–2003	BK Fremad Amager	93	(48)
2003	Valur	8	(0)
2004	Hvidovre IF	14	(4)
2004–2006	Kalundborg GB		
2006–2007	Brønshøj BK	44	(15)
2008	Glostrup FK		

International career
1992–1993	Denmark U19	5	(1)

Managerial career
- 2008–2011: Glostrup FK / BGA
- 2011–2013: Nordvest FC
- 2017–2019: BSF
- * Club domestic league appearances and goals

Thomas Ørdal Maale (born 22 October 1974) is a Danish former footballer and physical coach at HB Køge.

He played for a number of Danish clubs including Lyngby BK, Fremad Amager and Hvidovre IF.

In July 2008 he was named new manager of Glostrup FK. He continued as manager of the club, after it merged with Albertslund IF in 2009 to form BGA.

In July 2011 he succeeded Freddy Andersen as manager of Nordvest FC. He left the club in 2013 in order to become fitness coach at HB Køge.
