= Norlund =

Norlund, Nørlund or Nõrlund may refer to:

- Niels Erik Nørlund (1885–1980), Danish mathematician
  - Nørlund–Rice integral
  - Nõrlund mean
- Alex Nørlund, Danish football player
- Louise Nørlund (1854–1919), Danish feminist
- Poul Nørlund (1888-1951), Danish historian and archaeologist

Places

- Norlund Alps, Greenland
- Norlund Land, Greenland
- Norlund Slot (Nørlund castle) in Funen
