= Mogens Krogh =

Danish footballer and manager (born 1963)

Personal information
- Date of birth: 31 October 1963 (age 62)
- Place of birth: Hjørring, Denmark
- Height: 1.91 m (6 ft 3 in)
- Position: Goalkeeper

Youth career
- Horne KFUM
- Tårs Ugilt

Senior career*
Years	Team	Apps	(Gls)
1981–1991	Ikast fS	301	(0)
1991–2002	Brøndby IF	353	(1)
Total		654	(1)

International career
1992–1998	Denmark	10	(0)

Managerial career
- 2008–2009: Hvidovre IF
- 2011–2013: Nordvest FC (goalkeeping coach)
- 2013–2014: Nordvest FC
- 2014–2017: Næstved BK
Medal record
Men's football
Representing Denmark
UEFA European Championship
Winner	1992 Sweden
FIFA Confederations Cup
Winner	1995 Saudi Arabia
CONMEBOL–UEFA Cup of Champions
Runner-up	1993 Argentina
- * Club domestic league appearances and goals

Mogens Krogh (Danish pronunciation: [ˈmɔwns ˈkʰʁɔːw]; born 31 October 1963) is a Danish former professional football player who was most recently manager of Næstved BK. In his playing career, Krogh was the first choice goalkeeper of Ikast fS between 1981 and 1991 and of Brøndby from 1991 to his retirement in December 2002, playing 464 first team matches for the latter. Krogh also played 10 matches for the Denmark national football team. He has won both the UEFA European Championship and the FIFA Confederations Cup.

== Biography ==
Born in Hjørring, Denmark, Krogh started his career at small clubs Horne KFUM and Tårs Ugilt, before playing in the topflight Danish 1st Division for Ikast fS. In 1991, the Danish champions from the two years prior, Brøndby, sold their first choice keeper Peter Schmeichel, and Krogh was bought as a replacement. Brøndby did not initially find the success they sought, though Krogh would prove his worth in the domestic league. In the 1995–96 Danish Superliga (formerly known as 1st Division) season, Brøndby was trailing AGF in the league. In the direct match-up of the two teams late in the season, Brøndby was losing 2–3 when Krogh went into the attack at a corner kick, and headed the ball in goal for the 3–3 result that spurred Brøndby on to make a comeback and win the season title. He won four Danish league titles during his career.

On the international scene, Krogh played 66 matches for Brøndby IF, including highlights like the game against CD Tenerife in the 1997 UEFA Cup, when Krogh saved a penalty kick in a game Brøndby won 1–0. One of his best games was the 1998–99 UEFA Champions League match against Bayern Munich which Brøndby won 2–1, and Krogh was subsequently named 1999 Brøndby IF Player of the Year.

For the Danish national team, Krogh stood in the shadow of clear first choice keeper Peter Schmeichel, but Krogh was a stable understudy who was selected in the Danish squads for the 1992 European Championship (Euro 1992) and Euro 1996, as well as the 1998 FIFA World Cup without playing a single match. He was one in a trio, also counting Lars Høgh and Peter Kjær, who took turns in being first reserve for Schmeichel. Krogh would, however, shine in the King Fahd Cup 1995, when he came on as a substitute and saved two penalty kicks from Marcelino Bernal and Luis García Postigo in the semi-final against Mexico before playing the 2–0 win in the final against Argentina. This tournament is today named the FIFA Confederations Cup.

Following his retirement as a player in 2002, Krogh got a job in the public relations department of Brøndby IF. After three years in the job, Krogh decided in December 2005 to quit his job and leave the club, citing he wanted new challenges and only wanted to work in a football club if he had direct contact with the sporting aspect. One month later it was revealed that Krogh was hired for Brøndby as a coach for the young goalkeepers in the club, working under head talent scout Kim Vilfort, one of only three people to have played more matches for Brøndby than Krogh.

In January 2008 Krogh became employed in the sponsorship department of Hvidovre IF and manager of the club's reserve team. In 2009, he became new director of Hvidovre IF. He left the club at the end of 2010.

In 2011 Krogh became new sponsor consultant at Danish 2nd Divisions club Nordvest FC. In the summer of 2013 he replaced Thomas Maale as manager of the club.

Following a successful first season as manager Krogh was hired as manager of Næstved BK in the summer of 2014. He led the club to promotion to the Danish 1st Division in his first season and managed to avoid relegation in his second. In his third season as manager of the club, Næstved was struggling and Krogh was relieved of his duties in March 2017.

== Honours ==
Brøndby

- Danish Cup: 1993–94, 1997–98
- Danish Superliga: 1995–96, 1996–97, 1997–98, 2001–02

Denmark

- UEFA European Football Championship: 1992
- FIFA Confederations Cup: 1995
