= Kenneth Sørensen =

Danish footballer (born 1982)

Personal information
- Date of birth: 14 March 1982 (age 44)
- Place of birth: Denmark
- Height: 1.88 m (6 ft 2 in)
- Position: Midfielder

Senior career*
Years	Team	Apps	(Gls)
2003–2006	Holbæk B&I		
2006–2008	AC Horsens	15	(0)
2008–2009	Herfølge BK		
2009–2010	HB Køge	20	(1)
2010–2011	FC Hjørring	14	(0)
2012–2014	Flekkeroy IF	3	(0)
2014–2015	Gentofte VI		
2015–2017	Brønshøj BK		
- * Club domestic league appearances and goals

Kenneth Sørensen (born 14 March 1982) is a Danish former professional footballer who played as a midfielder for Holbæk B&I, AC Horsens, Herfølge BK, HB Køge, FC Hjørring, Flekkeroy IF, Gentofte VI and Brønshøj BK.

== Career ==
Sørensen started his career at Holbæk B&I but did not make a senior appearance. He joined AC Horsens in 2006 making his debut in a 2–0 loss against Odense BK. After making one appearance in his second season, Sørensen joined Danish 1st Division side Herfølge BK in 2008.

Sørensen signed for Danish Superliga side HB Køge in 2009 where he made 20 appearances and scored his first league goal. Following relegation, HB Køge announced they were not going to renew the contracts of five players, including Sorensen.

In 2010, Sørensen signed a one-year contract with FC Hjørring, who had achieved promotion from the Danish 2nd Division the season before. Sørensen departed at the end of the season and after spending a year without a club, joined Norwegian side Flekkeroy IF in 2012.

Sørensen would go on to join Gentofte VI and Brønshøj BK as an unused squad player, before announcing his retirement from professional football on 1 January 2017.
