= Martin Heinze =

Danish footballer (born 1983)

Personal information
- Date of birth: 28 February 1983 (age 43)
- Place of birth: Esbjerg, Denmark
- Position: Midfielder

Youth career
- 1990–1995: Sædding-Guldager IF
- 1995–2001: Esbjerg fB

Senior career*
Years	Team	Apps	(Gls)
2001–2004	Esbjerg fB	36	(5)
2004–2005	→ Horsens (loan)	28	(0)
2004–2007	Horsens	28	(0)
2007–2010	AB		
2009–2010	NB Bornholm		
2010	BK Skjold		
2010–2011	KFUM Roskilde		
2011–2014	FA 2000		
2014	Herlufsholm GF		

International career^{‡}
1999	Denmark U16	2	(0)
1999–2000	Denmark U17	5	(0)
2000–2002	Denmark U19	13	(1)
2002–2003	Denmark U20	6	(0)
- * Club domestic league appearances and goals as of 18 March 2007 ‡ National team caps and goals as of 25 September 2003

Martin Heinze (born 28 February 1983) is a Danish former professional footballer who played as a midfielder.
