= Tommy Løvenkrands =

Danish footballer (born 1974)

Personal information
- Full name: Tommy Løvenkrands
- Date of birth: 30 May 1974 (age 52)
- Place of birth: Hørsholm, Denmark
- Position: Midfielder

Youth career
- Lillerød
- Skjold Birkerød
- AB

Senior career*
Years	Team	Apps	(Gls)
1998–2000	AB	32	(3)
2000–2003	St Johnstone	71	(8)
2003–2006	Esbjerg	54	(2)
2006–2007	SønderjyskE	36	(2)
Total		157	(13)
- * Club domestic league appearances and goals

Tommy Løvenkrands (born 30 May 1974) is a Danish former professional football player. He most recently played as a winger for Danish club SønderjyskE. He is the older brother of Danish international winger Peter Løvenkrands.

== Career ==
Løvenkrands began his career at Akademisk Boldklub (AB) in the top-flight Danish Superliga in 1998, playing alongside his brother Peter Løvenkrands. He joined Scottish Premier League club St Johnstone in May 2000, after impressing then-manager Sandy Clark during a testimonial match for veteran Saints forward Roddy Grant. His brother Peter joined Rangers the following month. The brothers faced each other for the first time when Rangers faced Saints at McDiarmid Park in October 2000.

After the Perth club was relegated from the SPL in 2002, they could no longer offer Løvenkrands a similar pay deal, leading to his departure from the club in the summer of 2003.

He returned to Denmark to join Superliga club Esbjerg fB. Struggling to win a place in the starting line-up, he left the club in the summer 2006 to join league rivals SønderjyskE. In December 2007 he decided to end his career.

Since returning from professional football, Løvenkrads played in the Danish eighth division, for Esbjerg fB's second team in the Jutland Series and later also in the Danish Series 1 for Sædding/G IF, where he - among others - played for former professional Jesper Lange and his own son, Christian Løvenkrands. As of January 2021, 46-year old Løvenkrads was still active as a player for Sædding/G IF.
