= Jesper Kristoffersen =

Danish footballer (born 1984)

Personal information
- Date of birth: 2 February 1984 (age 42)
- Place of birth: Denmark
- Height: 1.95 m (6 ft 5 in)
- Position: Defender

Senior career*
Years	Team	Apps	(Gls)
–2008	Hvidovre IF		
2008–2010	SønderjyskE	16	(0)
2010–2011	Hvidovre IF	13	(2)
2011–2013	BK Avarta		

Managerial career
- 2013–: Avedøre IF (assistant)
- * Club domestic league appearances and goals as of 16 May 2010

Jesper Kristoffersen (born 2 February 1984) is a Danish former professional football defender.
