= Mikkel Christoffersen =

Danish footballer (born 1983)

Personal information
- Full name: Mikkel Christoffersen
- Date of birth: 10 August 1983 (age 43)
- Place of birth: Denmark
- Height: 1.87 m (6 ft 2 in)
- Position: Centre-back

Youth career
- OB

Senior career*
Years	Team	Apps	(Gls)
2004–2005	AB	0	(0)
2005–2006	Værløse BK	11	(0)
2006–2009	Herfølge	49	(3)
2009–2010	HB Køge	22	(0)
2010–2013	Fremad Amager		
2013–2014	B.93		
- * Club domestic league appearances and goals

Mikkel Christoffersen (born 10 August 1983) is a Danish former professional footballer who played as a centre-back.

== Career ==
Christoffersen played in the Danish Superliga for Herfølge Boldklub in 2006, and later also made 21 appearances for HB Køge at the highest level in the 2009–10 season. His contract with Køge was not renewed in 2010, and he went on trial at AB and Lyngby. However, he instead started higher education and signed for Denmark Series club Fremad Amager. He served as team captain before leaving in 2013.

== Retirement ==
In 2018, he became principal at Brøndby Idrætsefterskole, a boarding school for lower secondary students with a focus on physical education.
