= Steffen Rasmussen =

Danish footballer (born 1982)

Personal information
- Full name: Steffen Bjørnebo Rasmussen
- Date of birth: 30 September 1982 (age 44)
- Place of birth: Stenvad, Denmark
- Height: 1.80 m (5 ft 11 in)
- Position: Goalkeeper

Youth career
- Stenvad Boldklub
- AGF

Senior career*
Years	Team	Apps	(Gls)
1999–2001	Grenaa IF		
2001–2018	AGF	404	(1)

International career
2003	Denmark U-21	2	(0)
2010	Danish League XI	2	(0)
- * Club domestic league appearances and goals

Steffen Bjørnebo Rasmussen (born 30 September 1982), known as Steffen Rasmussen, is a Danish former professional footballer who played as a goalkeeper, spending most of his career with AGF. He made two appearances for the Denmark U21 national team.

== Club career ==
Born in Stenvad near Grenaa, Steffen Rasmussen played his youth football in minor club Stenvad Boldklub, before joining the youth setup of AGF Aarhus. He spent a year with lower-league Jutland Series club Grenaa IF, before returning to AGF. He established himself as second-choice keeper behind Erik Boye, and signed a professional contract with AGF in March 2002.

Under new manager Poul Hansen, Rasmussen made his Danish Superliga debut for AGF against Odense Boldklub on 10 November 2002, replacing Boye at half-time. As Boye suffered a back injury, Rasmussen played the next three games in a row. Boye returned to the starting line-up, but following another injury, Rasmussen established himself as AGF's first choice, playing the last 13 games of the 2002–03 Danish Superliga season. In August 2003, AGF brought in Rune Pedersen to replace the retiring Boye. Rasmussen began the 2003–04 Danish Superliga season as starting goalkeeper, but lost his place to Pedersen in April 2004 following a slump in form. He was second choice for the 2004–05 Danish Superliga season, but following an injury to Pedersen in April 2005, Rasmussen got another chance and again established himself in the starting line-up.

He was the undisputed first-choice goalkeeper for the 2005–06 Danish Superliga season, missing only four games through a hand injury. He was named the AGF player of the season, but could not keep AGF from being relegated. He stayed with AGF in the Danish 1st Division. He suffered a shoulder injury during the season, but helped the club bounce right back into the Superliga. He played all 33 games of the 2007–08 Danish Superliga season. Before the 2008–09 Danish Superliga season, he was named captain of the team by AGF coach Ove Pedersen, replacing Peter Graulund. He missed only two games that season, due to a hand injury. In a 1–0 defeat to FC Midtjylland on 14 April 2010, Rasmussen got his first red card in his AGF career, following a foul on Jonas Borring. He missed two games through suspension. Despite playing 31 of 33 games, Rasmussen could not keep AGF from being relegated at the end of the 2009–10 Danish Superliga season.

== International career ==
Having made his breakthrough with AGF, Rasmussen was called up for the Denmark U21 national team in March 2003, serving as a backup to Stephan Andersen. He made his under-21 debut in an April 2003 friendly match, and played an additional friendly game for the team in August that year.

Denmark senior national team coach Morten Olsen considered including Rasmussen in the squad for the 2010 FIFA World Cup qualification games against Portugal and Albania in September 2009, but chose Kim Christensen from IFK Göteborg instead. In January 2010, he was called up for the Denmark League XI to replace the injured Stephan Andersen, playing one unofficial national team game for the team.

== Retirement ==
On 20 March 2018, it was confirmed that Rasmussen retired from football.

== Style of play ==
Rasmussen's strengths were in one-on-one situations, relying on his quick reactions and vision for the game, but he was criticized for not commanding his field on especially corner kicks and free kicks, due to his lack of height.

Sporting positions
Preceded by (Denmark) Peter Graulund	AGF captain 2008–	Succeeded by Incumbent
