= Peter Graulund =

Danish footballer (born 1976)

Personal information
- Full name: Peter Graulund
- Date of birth: 20 September 1976 (age 50)
- Place of birth: Brørup, Denmark
- Height: 1.75 m (5 ft 9 in)
- Position: Striker

Youth career
- Vejen SF
- Kolding B

Senior career*
Years	Team	Apps	(Gls)
1995–1998	Vejle	93	(25)
1998–2001	Brøndby	53	(28)
2001–2004	VfL Bochum	21	(5)
2003	→ AGF (loan)	33	(14)
2004–2006	Helsingborgs IF	45	(17)
2006–2012	AGF	147	(53)
Total		392	(142)

International career
	Denmark U19	2	(0)
	Denmark U21	6	(2)

Managerial career
- 2012–2013: AGF U19 (assistant)
- * Club domestic league appearances and goals

Peter Graulund (born 20 September 1976) is a Danish former professional footballer who played as a striker. He played for Danish clubs Vejle Boldklub, Brøndby IF and AGF, German side VfL Bochum, and Swedish club Helsingborgs IF. He played six games and scored two goals for the Denmark national under-21 football team.

Graulund was a fan favourite at AGF, not only because of his goal scoring abilities but also due to his notorious fighting spirit. He was considered to be one of the best strikers in the Danish Superliga and is seventh on the list of top goalscorers all-time in the league. On 29 August 2011, he scored his 100th goal in the league in a win over AC Horsens. Graulund announced his retirement due to injuries on 12 October 2012.

== Club career ==
=== Domestic success (1995–2001) ===
Born in Brørup, Graulund played as a youth for Vejen SF and Kolding Boldklub before moving to Vejle Boldklub where he made his professional debut on 19 March 1995, aged 18, in a 1–0 win over Ikast FS. Head coach Ole Fritsen had promoted him to the first team, and he helped the club reach promotion to the Danish Superliga in his first season at the club. Before that, he had been a key player on the club's youth teams. In the 1996–97 season, he was part of the Vejle team that finished as runners-up in the Superliga alongside players such as Thomas Gravesen, Jesper Søgaard, Alex Nørlund and Jesper Mikkelsen. During that season, Graulund made 28 league appearances in which he scored five goals.

In 1998, Graulund moved to Brøndby IF, where he initially struggled. However, in the 2000–01 season, he began playing more regularly under head coach Åge Hareide and finished a great season as top goalscorer in the Superliga.

=== Years abroad (2001–2004) ===
After becoming top scorer, Graulund signed with recently promoted German Bundesliga club VfL Bochum for DM 2.8 million, where he never got a breakthrough; after a long period as a reserve player, he was loaned out to AGF in February 2003. There, he had great success as a goal scorer, but when AGF due to a poor financial situation could not afford buy him out of his contract in Bochum, he instead continued his career with Swedish club Helsingborgs IF, where he played for two seasons.

=== AGF (2004–2012) ===
In 2006, Graulund returned to AGF, where he captained the first team until 2008. Steffen Rasmussen then took over the captains armband. A few weeks later, Graulund scored the winner against former club Brøndby, which he later described as "saving my career at AGF", after the disappointment of losing his role as captain.

His time at AGF was tumultuous, and the club suffered two relegations from the Superliga – in 2005–06 and 2009–10. The team bounced back in both seasons down in the second-tier 1st Division, with Graulund finishing as top goalscorer in both seasons.

On 29 August 2011, Graulund scored his 100th goal in the Danish Superliga in a match against AC Horsens. On 26 October 2011, he tore one of his achilles tendons, which expected to keep him sidelined for nine months. Many experts therefore did not predict Graulund a comeback, as he was already 35 years old. However, Graulund returned to the pitch for AGF after only five months. In his first two matches after returning, he was substituted on with 30 minutes remaining, but managed to score in both matches, which AGF lost.

On 12 October 2012, however, Graulund was forced to retire effective immediately. He could no longer keep playing after several serious injuries, including the torn achilles tendon the year before. He scored his last Superliga goal when AGF beat Silkeborg 4–0 on 1 September 2012.

Graulund finished his career with 290 Danish Superliga appearance. With his 107 goals, he is number seven on the list of the top goalscorers in the league, surpassed only by Morten "Duncan" Rasmussen, Søren Frederiksen, Peter Møller, Heine Fernandez, Steffen Højer and Frank Kristensen. Of all his appearances, 219 appearances and 100 goals were in the AGF jersey, 93 matches in the Vejle jersey, and 53 matches in the Brøndby jersey. He also made 45 and 21 appearances for Helsingborgs IF and VfL Bochum, respectively.

Besides his club career, Graulund gained six caps and scored two goals for the Denmark national under-21 team.

== Honours ==
Individual

- AGF Player of the Season: 2010–11
- 1st Division Player of the Year: 2010
- Superliga top scorer: 2000–01 (21 goals)
- 1st Division top scorer: 2006–07 (17 goals), 2010–11 (20 goals)

Sporting positions
Preceded by Jesper Sørensen	AGF captain 2006–2008	Succeeded by Steffen Rasmussen
