= Anders Randrup =

Danish footballer (born 1988)

Personal information
- Full name: Anders Degn Randrup
- Date of birth: 16 July 1988 (age 38)
- Place of birth: Herlev, Denmark
- Height: 1.81 m (5 ft 11 in)
- Position: Right back

Youth career
- Avarta
- Brøndby

Senior career*
Years	Team	Apps	(Gls)
2007–2013	Brøndby	126	(2)
2013–2014	Horsens	31	(2)
2014–2015	Vestsjælland	22	(0)
2016–2017	IF Elfsborg	35	(1)
2018–2020	Helsingborgs IF	57	(0)
2020	Hvidovre	14	(0)
Total		285	(5)

International career
2004–2005	Denmark U17	15	(1)
2005–2006	Denmark U18	3	(0)
2006–2007	Denmark U19	11	(0)
2007–2009	Denmark U21	14	(0)
2008	Denmark	1	(0)
- * Club domestic league appearances and goals

Anders Degn Randrup (born 16 July 1988) is a Danish former professional footballer who played as a right back.

== Club career ==
Randrup played youth football alongside Daniel Wass in Avarta and later the Brøndby academy. As part of the latter club, former Brøndby head coach, Tom Køhlert often praised Randrups abilities, numerous times calling him a star player for the future. His first senior games for Brøndby were in the middle of one of the major crises of the club, struggling against relegation from the Danish Superliga, and Randrup initially failed to impress. However, in the second half of the 2007–08 season, with former Danish international Thomas Rytter demoted to the reserves, Randrup established himself as first choice for right back, and became an immediate fan- and media favourite after strong performances in the opening games.

In the summer of 2013, Randrup signed a two-year contract with AC Horsens, which had just been relegated from the Superliga to the 1st Division. There, he was appointed to replace Alexander Juel Andersen, who had just moved to AGF. Randrup made his official debut for Horsens on 28 July 2013, when he was substituted in the 71st minute instead of Henrik Toft in a 4–1 victory at home over Akademisk Boldklub.

After one year in Horsens, Randrup moved to FC Vestsjælland on 26 June 2014, where he signed a two-year contract. Vestsjælland picked him up on a free transfer. On 8 September 2014, Randrup suffered a knee injury in the Superliga match against Randers. Ten days later he underwent knee surgery and it was announced by the club that he would be sidelined for six months, after having played only three games in the previous season. He made a comeback in the Superliga in the last round when he was in the starting lineup and played all 90 minutes on 7 June 2015 in a 3–1 victory at home over Silkeborg.

On 21 December 2015 it was confirmed, that Randrup had signed a contract with IF Elfsborg in Sweden.

After a few years in Sweden, Randrup returned to Denmark on 1 September 2020, signing with Danish 1st Division club Hvidovre IF. Randrup decided to retire on 15 December 2020.

== International career ==
On 22 March 2008, Randrup was called up for the national team for a friendly game against the Czech Republic, where he came on as a substitute after 60 minutes for Thomas Kristensen, thus receiving his first cap.
