= Ulrik Johansen =

Danish footballer

Personal information
- Date of birth: 12 March 1980 (age 46)
- Place of birth: Denmark
- Height: 1.83 m (6 ft 0 in)
- Position: Midfielder

Team information
- Current team: FC Fredericia
- Number: 24

Youth career
- 1985–1995: Korinth IF
- 1996–1999: Odense Boldklub

Senior career*
Years	Team	Apps	(Gls)
1999–2003	Odense Boldklub		
2003–2004	Boldklubben 1909		
2004–2007	Vejle Boldklub	58	(6)
2007–present	FC Fredericia	1	(0)
- * Club domestic league appearances and goals as of 14 March 2008

Ulrik Johansen (born 12 March 1980) is a Danish professional football player, who is playing for the Danish 1st Division club FC Fredericia.

== Honours ==
OB

- Danish Cup: 2001–02
