= Holbæk Stadium =

Multi-use sports stadium in Holbæk, Denmark

- Interactive map of Holbæk Stadium
- Full name: Holbæk Stadium
- Location: Borgmestergårdsvej 11, 4300 Holbæk, Denmark
- Coordinates: 55°42′32″N 11°43′26″E
- Capacity: 10,500

Construction
- Opened: 1948
- Demolished: 2019

Holbæk Stadium (Danish: Holbæk Stadion) was a multi-use stadium in Holbæk, Denmark. It was currently used mostly for football matches and was the home stadium of Holbæk B&I (Holbæk Bold & Idrætsforening) and Nordvest FC. The stadium held 10,500 people.

== History ==
Built in 1948, the Holbæk Stadium was the home of Holbæk B&I. It was also an athletics stadium and hosted motorcycle speedway between 1950 and 1954. It held the final of the Danish Individual Speedway Championship in 1954.

In 2019, Holbæk B&I moved to play at the newly constructed Holbæk Sportsby (Sports City) football stadium.

The stadium was demolished to make way for housing.
