= Karsten Jensen =

Danish footballer (born 1950)

Personal information
- Full name: Karsten Lennart Jensen
- Date of birth: 10 April 1950 (age 76)
- Place of birth: Nørre Tranders, Denmark
- Position: Defender

Senior career*
Years	Team	Apps	(Gls)
1970–1975	AaB		
1975–1977	FC Groningen		
1978–1980	AaB		

International career
1973	Denmark	2	(0)
- * Club domestic league appearances and goals

Karsten Lennart Jensen (born 10 April 1950) is a Danish former footballer who played as a defender. He made two appearances for the Denmark national team in 1973.
