= Henrik Smedegaard =

Danish footballer (born 1985)

Personal information
- Date of birth: 6 June 1985 (age 41)
- Place of birth: Snejbjerg, Herning, Denmark
- Height: 1.78 m (5 ft 10 in)
- Position: Right back

Youth career
- 1990–98: Snejbjerg IF
- 1998–2003: Ikast FS

Senior career*
Years	Team	Apps	(Gls)
2003–2004	FC Midtjylland	11	(0)
2004–2007	Vejle Boldklub	48	(8)
2007–2008	Kolding FC	4	(0)
2008–2012	FC Fredericia	115	(8)
2012	AC Horsens	4	(0)

International career^{‡}
2001–2002	Denmark U-17	9	(0)
2003–2004	Denmark U-19	5	(1)
2004–2005	Denmark U-20	6	(0)
- * Club domestic league appearances and goals as of 26 March 2013 ‡ National team caps and goals as of 16 November 2006

Henrik Smedegaard (born 6 June 1985) is a Danish retired professional football player.

After terminating his contract with AC Horsens in the last day of the year 2012, he decided to retire from playing professionally in his age 27th, earlier on average. He said he will study for a master's degree in law.
