= Rune Pedersen (footballer) =

Danish footballer (born 1979)

Personal information
- Date of birth: 9 October 1979 (age 47)
- Place of birth: Copenhagen, Denmark
- Position: Goalkeeper

Senior career*
Years	Team	Apps	(Gls)
2000–2003	Copenhagen	32	(0)
2003	Modena		
2003–2005	AGF	25	(0)
2005–2007	Nottingham Forest	19	(0)
2007–2012	Lyngby Boldklub	99	(0)
2009–2010	→ OB (loan)	0	(0)
2012	Nordsjælland	0	(0)
2012–2013	AB	18	(0)

International career
1995	Denmark U16	2	(0)
1995–1996	Denmark U17	6	(0)
1996	Denmark U19	1	(0)
2000–2001	Denmark U21	8	(0)
- * Club domestic league appearances and goals

Rune Pedersen (born 9 October 1979) is a Danish former professional footballer who played as a goalkeeper.

Pedersen won two Danish Superliga championships with his first club Copenhagen, and went on to play for Danish clubs AGF, Lyngby, OB, and Nordsjælland as well as Italian club Modena and Nottingham Forest in England. At international level, he amassed a total 17 youth caps for Denmark under four different age groups.

== Club career ==
Born in Copenhagen, Pedersen started his career at clubs in his hometown. He played youth football with Hvidovre IF, before moving to Kjøbenhavns Boldklub (KB), the reserve team of Copenhagen (FCK) in the top-flight Danish Superliga championship. He got his first team debut for FCK in August 2000, when he replaced the injured Michael Stensgaard. He went on to win two Superliga championships with FCK, but never fully established himself as FCK's starting goalkeeper. He saw competition from a number of goalkeepers, including Swedish international goalkeeper Magnus Kihlstedt and Norwegian international goalkeeper Thomas Myhre. After two and a half years with FCK, he rejected a contract offer from the club in January 2003.

He trained with English club Chelsea, but did not get a contract offer. Instead, he was sold to Italian club Modena in the Serie A championship. Pedersen only spent half a year with the club, before he was released in the summer 2003, after claiming he did not enjoy life in Italy.

He trained with an English club again, this time Portsmouth, but finally moved back to Denmark to play for AGF in August 2003. Initially a substitute for the three years younger Steffen Rasmussen, Pedersen made his AGF debut in April 2004, and was subsequently kept as starting goalkeeper. During the 2004–05 season, Pedersen and five other players were fined for partying on a night where the team lost to Aalborg BK. He denied paying the fine, and even though the club later dropped the claim, Pedersen was finished in AGF.

He linked up with English side Nottingham Forest during their pre-season tour of Denmark in preparation for the 2005–06 season and whilst on trial won himself a two-year contract at the City Ground. After starting the season as first choice keeper the return to fitness of Paul Gerrard and the arrival of Russell Hoult on loan from West Bromwich Albion relegated Pedersen to third choice goalkeeper. The departure of manager Gary Megson, Hoult returning to West Brom and further injury to Paul Gerrard presented Pedersen with another chance. Pedersen performed well in the eyes of many Forest fans and contributed to a resurgence in form which saw Forest climb to within two points of a play-off berth by the end of the season. The appointment of Colin Calderwood as the new manager of Nottingham Forest in June 2006 and the arrival of Southampton goalkeeper Paul Smith limited Rune to just a handful of appearances during the 2006–07 season. His contract was not renewed by the English club and consequently he became a free agent on 30 June 2007.

Rune then signed with Danish Superliga club Lyngby BK. Lyngby were relegated following the 2007–08 season, but Pedersen stayed with the club in the Danish 1st Division. On 29 August 2009 he was loaned to Superliga club Odense Boldklub for the rest of the year, but served as a back-up to Roy Carroll before returning to Lyngby in January 2010. Back at Lyngby, he helped the club finish second in the 2010 1st Division and gain promotion for the Superliga.

== International career ==
While at KB, Pedersen was called up for a number of national youth team matches from April 1995 to September 1996. Having made his breakthrough with FCK, he was called up for the Denmark under-21 national team in November 2000, and played eight games for the team until September 2001.

== Honours ==
Copenhagen

- Danish Superliga: 2000–01, 2002–03
- Danish Super Cup: 2001

Nordsjælland

- Danish Superliga: 2011–12
