= Lasse Ankjær =

Danish footballer (born 1983)

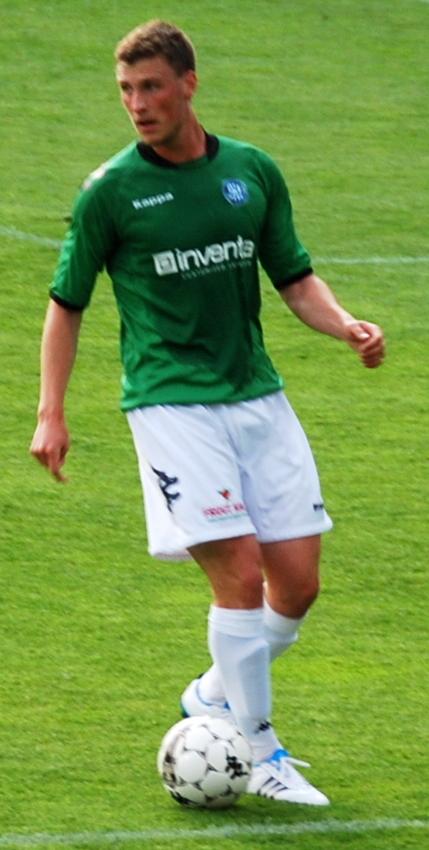

Personal information
- Date of birth: 30 March 1983 (age 43)
- Place of birth: Kalundborg, Denmark
- Height: 1.87 m (6 ft 2 in)
- Position: Forward

Team information
- Current team: Hobro IK
- Number: 28

Youth career
- Raklev GI
- Kalundborg GB
- 2000 – 2002: Silkeborg Fodbold College

Senior career*
Years	Team	Apps	(Gls)
2002 – 2006	Silkeborg IF	13	(0)
2007	→ Skive IK (loan)		
2007 – 2009	Skive IK		
2009 – 2012	Viborg FF	86	(6)
2012 –	Hobro IK	1	(1)
- * Club domestic league appearances and goals as of 2 August 2012

Lasse Ankjær (born 30 March 1983) is a Danish football forward, who plays for the Danish 1st Division club Hobro IK.
