= SC Egedal =

Danish football club

- Full name: Sports Club Egedal
- Short name: SC Egedal
- Founded: 1 July 2011; 14 years ago
- Dissolved: 30 June 2015; 10 years ago
- Ground: Ølstykke Stadion, Ølstykke
- Capacity: 3,000
Home colours	Away colours

Sports Club Egedal (Danish: [ˈspɒːtsˌkʰlup ˈe̝ːjəˌtɛˀl]; simply known as SC Egedal or SCE) was a Danish football club from Egedal which was founded on 1 July 2011. The club was the result of a partial merger between the women's and men's senior teams of Stenløse Boldklub and Ølstykke FC. At the extraordinary general assemblies of the two parent clubs in January and February 2011, the members of the clubs voted by a large majority to merge the two senior departments, and the Danish Football Association (DBU) approved the partial merger on 2 April 2011.

The Zealand-based team played their home matches at Ølstykke Stadium, which has a total capacity of 3,000 spectators (of which 752 seated). The club was a member of DBU and the local football association, DBU Zealand, and played in red jersey, navy blue shorts and navy blue socks. The club's logo symbolized the Veksø helmets, which are unique to both Egedal's local history and Danish cultural perception. The two helmets can be dated to the Late Bronze Age, approximately 1,000 to 800 BC.

After a historically strong Danish 2nd Division East group in 2011–12, SC Egedal suffered relegation to the fourth-tier Denmark Series (2012–13) despite achieving 32 points and a goal score of only −3. Despite the relegation, SC Egedal managed to hold on to a core group of players, and mixed with a larger group of young talents from Team Egedal, the red-blues managed to return to the higher divisions after only a season's absence. The team won the Denmark Series Group 2 ahead of GVI on goal difference, to which especially Thomas Wagner was a major contributor with no less than 40 season goals.

The following season in the 2nd Division East 2013–14 was one long battle for avoiding relegation, and the team eventually had to see themselves suffered relegation to the Denmark Series again at the end of the season. At the start of the new season, SC Egedal dismissed head coach Jimmy Kastrup on 6 October 2014, after disappointing results, and the club ended the season as 11th in the league table.

On 24 February 2015, Stenløse Boldklub held an extraordinary general meeting, where it was decided that at the end of the season, Stenløse Boldklub would withdraw from SC Egedal. This meant that the club was dissolved as of 30 June 2015, and that Stenløse Boldklub had to continue the upcoming season in the fifth-tier Zealand Series while Ølstykke FC had to compete in the DBU Zealand Series 3, the eight-tier in the Danish football league system.
