= Anders Simonsen =

Danish footballer (born 1983)

Personal information
- Full name: Anders Dahl Simonsen
- Date of birth: 9 March 1983 (age 43)
- Place of birth: Denmark
- Height: 1.88 m (6 ft 2 in)
- Position: Midfielder

Team information
- Current team: B.93
- Number: 19

Senior career*
Years	Team	Apps	(Gls)
2003–2005	Herfølge BK	3	(0)
2005–2006	Brønshøj BK	28	(1)
2006–2009	Herfølge BK	59	(15)
2009–2010	HB Køge	4	(0)
2010	FC Roskilde	12	(2)
2010–2012	Rishøj BK		
2012–2013	Melbourne Sharks	16	(3)
2013	Rishøj BK		
2013–	B.93	42	(3)
- * Club domestic league appearances and goals as of 8 March 2015

Anders Dahl Simonsen (born 9 March 1983) is a Danish football player currently playing for Danish 2nd Division East side B.93. He plays as a midfielder.
