= Morten Christiansen (footballer) =

Danish footballer (born 1978)

Personal information
- Date of birth: 4 January 1978 (age 48)
- Place of birth: Århus, Denmark
- Position: Midfielder

Team information
- Current team: Lyngby BK
- Number: 7

Senior career*
Years	Team	Apps	(Gls)
- IK Skovbakken
- Vejlby-Risskov IK
- Aarhus Fremad
????–2004	AC Horsens		
2004–2012	Lyngby BK		
2012–present	FC Royal		
- * Club domestic league appearances and goals as of 1 July 2007

Morten Christiansen (born 4 January 1978) is a Danish professional football midfielder, who currently plays for FC Royal.
