= John Dyring =

Danish footballer (born 1983)

Personal information
- Full name: John Dyring
- Date of birth: 14 July 1983 (age 43)
- Place of birth: Vridsted, Denmark
- Height: 1.84 m (6 ft 0 in)
- Position: Midfielder

Youth career
- Vridsted IF
- Viborg

Senior career*
Years	Team	Apps	(Gls)
2000–2006	Viborg	26	(2)
2005	→ Horsens (loan)		
2006	→ Thisted (loan)		
2007–2011	Skive	79	(11)
2011–2013	Hobro	36	(6)
2013–2018	Skive	70	(6)
2022	Skive II		

Managerial career
- 2018–2019: Skive (head of academy)
- 2019–2020: Midtjylland (U14)
- 2020–2021: Midtjylland (U13)
- * Club domestic league appearances and goals

John Dyring (born 14 July 1983) is a Danish former professional footballer who played as a midfielder.

Dyring played most of his career for Skive IK in the second-tier Danish 1st Division, becoming a key player in midfield and team captain. His late career was hampered by injuries, and he has since talked about mental issues as part of injuries. Since his retirement, he has worked as a youth coach and as a sales manager.

== Club career ==
=== Early career ===
Dyring was born in Vridsted, Viborg Municipality, and began his career at local club Vridsted IF before moving to the Viborg FF youth academy. He made his professional debut in the Danish Superliga in 2001, when he came on as a substitute and played the final 10 minuted of a 3–1 home win over HFK Sønderjylland. His last match in the Superliga was on 6 November 2005 – he made a total of 26 appearances in the Superliga.

On 1 January 2007, Dyring moved to second-tier Danish 1st Division club Skive IK, after having been loaned out to AC Horsens and Thisted FC. In Skive, he became team captain, among other things. After five years as a key player for Skive, Dyring had his contract with the club terminated at the end of August 2011. This happened after being sidelined with a serious injury and subsequently struggling to make the first team.

Following the termination of the contract with Skive IK, Dyring signed with fellow 1st Division club Hobro IK on 1 September 2011.

On 10 June 2013, Dyring returned to Skive IK, where he signed a two-year contract. Skive had recently been relegated to the third-tier 2nd Division West, which resulted in Skive finding a new head coach, Jakob Michelsen. In Dyring's first match after returning to Skive IK, however, he was injured and was out for a month.

=== Retirement and coaching ===
On 30 August 2018, Dyring announced his retirement from football after suffering from a recurring achilles tendon injury. Immediately after he retired, he was hired as sports and talent manager for the youth department at Skive IK. Beside that, he also worked as sales manager in a sporting goods retail company.

He left his position at Skive in the summer 2019, to go to FC Midtjylland, where he had been hired as U14 coach. For the 2020–21 season, he was in charge of the U13 team.

He left the position at Midtjylland in December 2021, to start a new career as a teacher at a secondary school, where he would also be part of the football coaching team. On 1 March 2022 it was also confirmed, that 38-year old Dyring would play for the reserve team of Skive IK in the Danish Series 1.

== Personal life ==
After his retirement, Dyring has talked about depression, loneliness and mental problems related to injuries in football and been a proponent of mental coaches and openness related to psychological problems in the sport.
