= Mikael Rynell =

Swedish footballer

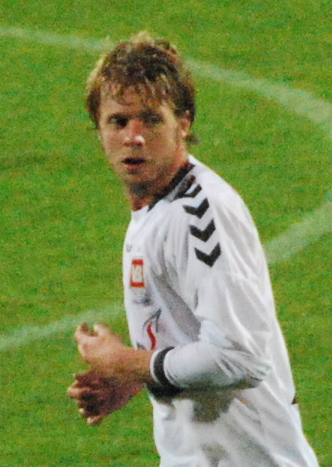
- Rynell in September 2011

Personal information
- Date of birth: 25 February 1982 (age 44)
- Place of birth: Stockholm, Sweden
- Height: 1.83 m (6 ft 0 in)
- Position: Midfielder

Youth career
- –1999: Hammarby TFF

Senior career*
Years	Team	Apps	(Gls)
2000–2002	Brommapojkarna	74	(4)
2003–2005	Landskrona BoIS	41	(0)
2005–2008	Herfølge BK	34	(11)
2009–2011	Esbjerg fB	23	(0)
2010–2011	→ Vejle BK (loan)	22	(7)
2011–2012	Vejle Kolding	12	(5)
2012–2013	Hammarby IF	43	(2)
2014–2016	FC Fredericia	53	(1)
2016–2019	FC Gute		
- * Club domestic league appearances and goals as of 8 July 2016

Mikael Rynell (born 25 February 1982) is a Swedish former professional footballer who last played for FC Gute as a midfielder.
