= Niclas Tüchsen =

Danish footballer (born 1989)

Personal information
- Date of birth: July 28, 1989 (age 37)
- Place of birth: Solrød, Denmark
- Height: 1.83 m (6 ft 0 in)
- Position: Midfielder

Team information
- Current team: Rishøj BK

Youth career
- Køge BK

Senior career*
Years	Team	Apps	(Gls)
- Hvidovre IF
2008–2010	Viborg FF	10	(0)
2009	→ Hobro IK (loan)	?	(4)
2010	FC Copenhagen Res.		
2010–2011	Hvidovre IF		
2011	FB		
2011–2012	Hvidovre IF		
2012–	Rishøj BK		

International career
2007–2008	Denmark U19	3	(0)
- * Club domestic league appearances and goals as of 11 March 2015

Niclas Tüchsen (born July 28, 1989) is a Danish football midfielder, who plays for the Rishøj BK. He played two games for Viborg FF in the Danish Superliga 2007-08 season.
