= Nicolai Melchiorsen =

Danish footballer (born 1984)

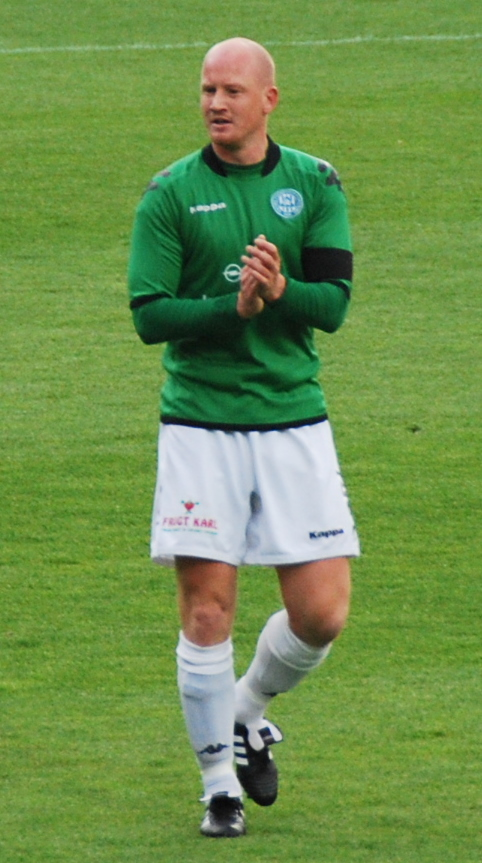
- Nicolai Melchiorsen, May 2011. (Photo: Lars Schmidt)

Personal information
- Date of birth: 9 March 1984 (age 42)
- Place of birth: Denmark
- Height: 1.81 m (5 ft 11 in)
- Position: Midfielder

Youth career
- Virum-Sorgenfri BK

Senior career*
Years	Team	Apps	(Gls)
2003–2005	AB	27	(0)
2006–2010	Lyngby BK	108	(6)
2010–2011	Viborg FF	23	(3)
2011–2012	AB	10	(0)
2012–2013	HIK		

International career
2000	Denmark U-16	3	(0)
2000–2001	Denmark U-17	11	(0)
2001–2003	Denmark U-19	6	(0)
- * Club domestic league appearances and goals as of 24 July 2012

Nicolai Melchiorsen (born 9 March 1984) is a Danish professional football midfielder. He played for Lyngby BK before signing for Viborg FF in 2010.
