= Poul Hübertz =

Danish footballer (born 1976)

Personal information
- Date of birth: 21 September 1976 (age 50)
- Place of birth: Roskilde, Denmark
- Height: 1.95 m (6 ft 5 in)
- Position: Forward

Senior career*
Years	Team	Apps	(Gls)
1998–2000	FC Roskilde		
2000	BK Frem	25	(8)
2001–2003	Farum	43	(13)
2003	→ BK Frem (loan)	15	(8)
2003–2005	Herfølge	56	(16)
2005–2006	AaB	26	(3)
2006–2007	Millwall	34	(9)
2007–2008	Northampton Town	40	(13)
2008–2009	AB	29	(14)
2009–2010	FC Midtjylland	7	(1)
2010	FC Roskilde	12	(3)
2010–2011	KFUM Roskilde		
2011	Hvidovre IF		
2011–2014	KFUM Roskilde		
2014–XXXX	Karlslunde IF		

Managerial career
- 2014–XXXX: Karlslunde IF (player/assistant-coach)
- * Club domestic league appearances and goals

Poul Hübertz (born 21 September 1976) is a Danish former professional footballer who played as a forward. He previously played for a number of Danish clubs, including Farum BK, Herfølge BK, AaB, and FC Midtjylland in the Danish Superliga, and has also represented English football clubs Millwall and Northampton Town. With his long legs and unelegant style, he was known in Denmark as a somewhat atypical striker.

== Club career ==
Born in Roskilde, Denmark, Hübertz started his career with local club Roskilde Boldklub 1906 in the Danish 2nd Division. He moved to Danish 1st Division club BK Frem, making his Frem debut in March 2000. In January 2001, he was bought be 1st Division rivals Farum BK. He helped the club win promotion for the Danish Superliga, but following only five games in the first half of the 2002–03 Danish Superliga season, he spent six months on loan back with Frem.

In the summer 2003, Hübertz moved on to Superliga club Herfølge BK. He played two full seasons with Herfølge, scoring 11 goals as Herfølge were relegated during the 2004–05 Danish Superliga season. He was then bought by Superliga club AaB. He only scored three goals in 26 league games for the team, and was replaced in the AaB squad by Rade Prica.

=== English career ===
Hübertz sought a new club, and eventually signed with English club Millwall in July 2006. He was very popular with the Millwall fans and was most effective when he came off the bench in the final 20 mins of a game.

After a 2–0 loss to Port Vale on 24 March 2007, Port Vale chairman Bill Bratt accused Hübertz of playing a part in the melee leading to the red card given to Vale's left back Jason Talbot. The reason was that Hübertz ran over 30 yards to the referee, to say his piece about a foul on Millwall's Ryan Smith by Jason Talbot, which led to the red card. Bill Bratt called Hübertz's actions "unforgivable". Hubertz had said that he would like to extend his Millwall contract but was not wanted by Millwall manager Willie Donachie.

He then joined Northampton Town on an initial 12-month deal in August 2007. Hübertz scored his first goal for the Cobblers in a 2–1 defeat at home against Yeovil Town on 25 August 2007. On 1 January 2008, in a game against his former club Millwall he was sent off after a clash with ex-teammate Neil Harris. At the end of the 2007–08 season, despite being the club's top scorer, Northampton decided not to offer Hubertz a new contract as he wanted to return to his native country.

=== Return to Denmark ===
Hübertz returned to Denmark and signed on to play for AB in the 1st Division in summer 2008. He was released from AB on the penultimate day of the 2009 summer transfer window. He signed for Superliga club FC Midtjylland on the same day, joining the club under manager Allan Kuhn whom he knew from his time at AaB. On 20 January 2010, he signed with his childhood club Roskilde in the 1st Division, now known as FC Roskilde.
