= Jesper M. Kristensen =

Danish footballer (born 1986)

Jesper Mølgaard Kristensen
Personal information
- Full name: Jesper Mølgaard Kristensen
- Date of birth: 16 September 1986 (age 40)
- Place of birth: Denmark
- Position: Midfielder

Youth career
- HIK
- B.93

Senior career*
Years	Team	Apps	(Gls)
2003–2009	Lyngby BK	52	(2)
2008–2009	Brønshøj BK	1	(0)
- * Club domestic league appearances and goals

Jesper Mølgaard Kristensen (born 16 September 1986) is a Danish former professional football midfielder, who played 52 matches for Lyngby BK including 13 matches in the Danish Superliga.
