= Jonas Thomsen =

Danish footballer and player-manager (born 1991)

Personal information
- Full name: Jonas Thomsen
- Date of birth: 5 February 1991 (age 35)
- Place of birth: Denmark
- Height: 1.88 m (6 ft 2 in)
- Positions: Defensive midfielder; centre-back

Youth career
- Kalundborg G&B
- Holbæk B&I
- 2009–2011: Silkeborg IF

Senior career*
Years	Team	Apps	(Gls)
2008–2009	Holbæk B&I		
2009–2011	Silkeborg IF II		
2011–2012	Svebølle B&I		
2012–2015	FC Vestsjælland	45	(0)
2015	→ HB Køge (loan)	14	(0)
2015–2016	Kalundborg GB		
2016–2018	Holbæk B&I	25	(6)
2018–2025	Svebølle B&I		

Managerial career
- 2018–2025: Svebølle B&I (player-manager)
- * Club domestic league appearances and goals

Jonas Thomsen (born 5 February 1991) is a retired Danish footballer and manager.

== Career ==
=== Holbæk B&I ===
Thomsen got his debut for the first team, at the age of 16. In a period, he trained with FC Midtjylland, but they didn't get to any agreement, because they seemed he was to thin.

=== Silkeborg IF ===
Thomsen transferred to Silkeborg IF in 2009 on a two-year contract, where he basically was going to play for the under-19 team. He was 17 years old at this time.

After joining his new club, he also joined the Silkeborg Sports College. As the time went, he also played matches for the reserve team.

=== FC Vestsjælland ===
On 15 December 2012, he signed a 2,5-year contract with FC Vestsjælland, who also was his first professional contract.

=== Loan to HB Køge ===
On 6 January 2015, Thomsen joined HB Køge on a loan deal until the summer.

=== Kalundborg G&B ===
In the summer 2015, Thomsen returned to his child-club Kalundborg G&B.

=== Holbæk B&I ===
Thomsen joined Holbæk B&I in the summer 2016.
