= Tjørring IF =

Danish football club

- Full name: Tjørring Idrætsforening
- Short name: TIF
- Founded: 19 June 1945; 81 years ago
- Ground: Tjørring Stadion, Herning, Denmark
- Capacity: 500
- Chairman: Peter Nowack
- Manager: Casper Johnsen
- League: Series 2 (VIII)
Home colours	Away colours

Tjørring Idrætsforening is an association football club based in Tjørring, a suburb of Herning, Denmark, that competes in the Series 2, the eighth tier of the Danish football league system. Founded in 1945, it is affiliated to DBU Jutland. The team plays its home matches at Tjørring Stadion, which has a capacity of 1,200.

The club received some media coverage when they gained promotion to the second division, in spite of only finishing sixth in their Denmark Series pool, from which only two teams promote. However, since the rules state that a maximum of eight Superliga-second teams are allowed in the second division, and eight Superliga clubs' second squads already were qualified for the second division, and four of the top five spots were occupied by Superliga clubs' second squads, Tjørring was given the promotion spot. This was their third promotion in three seasons.

== Colours ==
The club's distinctive colour has often been commented on, as they are atypical in Danish football. Originally, the club's colours were yellow and black. But in 1983, it was decided that the club should have new colours. The choice was placed in the hands of the English Football League First Division, so the winner of the match in the upcoming Tipslørdag, would be Tjørring IF's new colors. Tipslørdag broadcast the match between West Ham United and Tottenham Hotspur, a match which West Ham won 3–0 and thus the colors were chosen. As a result, Tjørring IF has since played in claret and sky blue that characterise them today.
