= Kevin Bechmann Timm =

Danish footballer (born 1989)

Personal information
- Date of birth: 9 July 1989 (age 37)
- Place of birth: Denmark
- Height: 1.84 m (6 ft 1/2 in)
- Positions: Midfielder; forward

Youth career
- –2009: FC Copenhagen

Senior career*
Years	Team	Apps	(Gls)
2009–2012	Esbjerg fB	7	(0)
2012	FC Roskilde	12	(1)
2012–2014	AB	46	(6)
2014–2017	Næstved BK		
2017–2020	Brønshøj BK		
2020–2021	FC Græsrødderne		
2022	Brønshøj BK		
- * Club domestic league appearances and goals

Kevin Bechmann Timm (born 9 July 1989) is a Danish footballer who plays as a midfielder or a forward.

== Career ==
Bechmann Timm played for FC Copenhagen as a youth player until he moved to Esbjerg fB in the summer of 2009.

In Esbjerg fB he played in the Superliga but after a disappointing year in 2012, he asked for his release in March 2012. Bechmann Timm then had a short stay at FC Roskilde the first half of year 2012.

On 30 July 2012 Bechmann Timm signed a 2-year deal with Akademisk Boldklub.

Later he went to Næstved Boldklub, where he helped them move from second to first division. After three years he left the club to go to his Fathers favorite club Brønshøj Boldklub. For three consecutive years he became the top scorer and stopped his career due to difficult economical conditions in Danish football.

He now work as trainer and mentor for young talents.
