= Thiago (footballer, born October 1988) =

Brazilian footballer (born 1988)

Personal information
- Full name: Thiago Pinto Borges
- Date of birth: 22 October 1988 (age 38)
- Place of birth: São Paulo, Brazil
- Height: 1.71 m (5 ft 7 in)
- Position: Midfielder

Team information
- Current team: Novigrad

Youth career
- Bahia
- 2003–2006: Esbjerg

Senior career*
Years	Team	Apps	(Gls)
2006–2009	Esbjerg	16	(1)
2010	Mosor	12	(1)
2011–2012	Trelleborgs FF	26	(4)
2013–2016	Vestsjælland	32	(6)
2015	→ AB (loan)	14	(0)
2015–2016	→ Skive (loan)	17	(0)
2016–2016	Þróttur	20	(2)
2017	07 Vestur	17	(0)
2017–2019	Avarta	65	(11)
2019–2021	Mosor		
2021–	Novigrad		
- * Club domestic league appearances and goals as of 21:36, 1 January 2020 (UTC)

Thiago Pinto Borges (born 22 October 1988), commonly known simply as Thiago, is a Brazilian footballer who plays for Croatian Third Football League club Novigrad.

== Career ==
From 2006 until 2009, Thiago played football in Denmark. From 2010 until 2011 he played in Sweden, before returning to Denmark. From early 2016 he played in Iceland. In November 2016, he moved on a free transfer to the newly promoted Faroe Islands club 07 Vestur. In May 2017, he joined Danish club Avarta. He left the club in the summer 2019 and returned to Croatian club NK Mosor in October 2019. On 1 August 2021, Thiago signed with Croatian Third Football League club Novigrad.
