= Rawez Lawan =

Swedish footballer (born 1987)

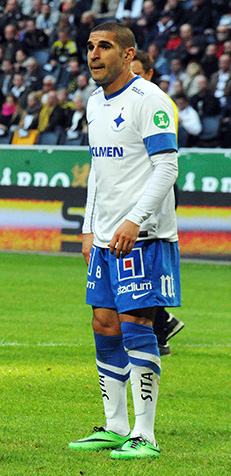

Personal information
- Full name: Rawez Farhad Lawan
- Date of birth: 4 October 1987 (age 39)
- Place of birth: Malmö, Sweden
- Height: 1.77 m (5 ft 10 in)
- Position: Midfielder

Youth career
- 1999–2002: Kvarnby IK
- 2003–2004: Malmö FF

Senior career*
Years	Team	Apps	(Gls)
2005–2006	Malmö FF	7	(0)
2006–2009	AC Horsens	83	(14)
2009–2012	FC Nordsjælland	85	(13)
2013–2015	IFK Norrköping	57	(4)
2016–2020	Dalkurd FF	103	(11)
2020	Vasalund	9	(0)

International career
2004	Sweden U17	8	(1)
2006	Sweden U19	3	(1)
2007–2008	Sweden U21	7	(0)
- * Club domestic league appearances and goals

Rawez Farhad Lawan (born 4 October 1987) is a Swedish former professional footballer who played primarily as a midfielder.

Lawan joined AC Horsens in the summer of 2006, and played an important role in the club's successful struggle against relegation during the 2006–07 Danish Superliga season.

In summer 2009 he signed a 4-year contract with FC Nordsjælland.

On 7 January 2013 he signed a 3-year deal with Swedish side IFK Norrköping.

On 18 December 2006 Lawan was called up for the Sweden U21 team.

== Honours ==
=== Club ===
- Allsvenskan:
  - Winners: 2015
- Danish Superliga:
  - Winners: 2011–12
- Danish Cup:
  - Winners (2): 2009–10, 2010–11
