= Avedøre IF =

Association football club in Hvidovre, Denmark

- Full name: Avedøre Idrætsforening
- Founded: 1 April 1932; 93 years ago
- Ground: Avedøre Stadion, Hvidovre
- Capacity: 1,200
- League: Zealand Series
- 2022–23: Zealand Series Group 1, 11th of 14
- Website: www.avedore-fodbold.dk
Home colours

Avedøre Idrætsforening, commonly known as Avedøre IF, is a sports club based in Avedøre, Hvidovre Municipality, Denmark. The club is mostly known for its association football team that competes in the Zealand Series, of the sixth tiers of the Danish football league system. Founded in 1932, with the football team being formed in 1973, it is affiliated to the regional DBU Zealand football association. The team plays its home matches at the 1,200 spectator capacity Avedøre Stadion.

== History ==
The club's first chairman was Jens Andresen, while teacher Henry Aabo was elected as the club's first treasurer. In the first years after the club's founding in 1932, association football was played in the summer, which started with practice on the military grounds at the aircraft hangars on Gammel Køgevej, and gymnastics in the winter at the nearby Avedøre School. Since then, the football department in the club changed its home ground several times. In 1933, players wore blue blouses and white pants. In 1944, they received their own clubhouse and also a membership magazine. In the 1940s, a handball department was started at the same time. On 27 November 1972, it was decided to change the club's statutes and divide Avedøre IF into three departments – the main department, the handball department and the football department – so that Avedøre IF Fodbold was established at a founding general meeting on 25 October 1973. In 1990, square dance was also on the program.

The first team in the club's football division has fluctuated between Series 3 and the Danish 2nd Division. On 22 September 2010, Avedøre lost 2–3 to Danish Superliga club FC Midtjylland in the third round of the Danish Cup.
