= Jeppe Mehl =

Danish footballer (born 1986)

Personal information
- Date of birth: 21 September 1986 (age 40)
- Place of birth: Thisted, Denmark
- Height: 1.85 m (6 ft 1 in)
- Position: Midfielder

Team information
- Current team: Holstebro
- Number: 18

Youth career
- Thisted

Senior career*
Years	Team	Apps	(Gls)
2005–2007	Thisted	14	(1)
2007–2011	Esbjerg	92	(8)
2011–2018	Horsens	154	(12)
2018–2020	Thisted	41	(3)
2020–	Holstebro	9	(0)

Managerial career
- 2019–2020: Thisted FC (player-assistant)
- * Club domestic league appearances and goals

Jeppe Mehl (born 21 September 1986) is a Danish footballer who plays as a midfielder for Danish 2nd Division club Holstebro Boldklub.

== Career ==
On 20 April 2018, it was confirmed that Mehl would return to Thisted FC for the 2018–19 season after playing multiple years in the higher Danish divisions for Esbjerg fB and AC Horsens . Mehl was promoted to playing assistant manager at the end of June 2019 for the upcoming season.

In June 2020, Mehl moved to fourth-tier Denmark Series club Holstebro Boldklub, who he helped to promotion to the third tier in his first months at the club after play-offs against Silkeborg KFUM.
