= Ismael (footballer, born 1983) =

Brazilian footballer

Personal information
- Full name: Ismael Raul da Silva Miranda
- Date of birth: September 12, 1983 (age 43)
- Place of birth: Porto Alegre, Brazil
- Height: 1.82 m (5 ft 11 1/2 in)
- Position: Left back

Senior career*
Years	Team	Apps	(Gls)
2001–2004	Internacional	6	(0)
- Brasil de Pelotas
2005	América		
- Paysandu
2005	Caxias		
2006	Portuguesa Santista		
2007–2009	Herfølge Boldklub	42	(3)
2009	HB Køge	0	(0)
2010	Caxias		
2011	Porto Alegre		
2011	Aimoré		
2011	Luverdense	2	(0)
- * Club domestic league appearances and goals as of 20 June 2011

Ismael Raul da Silva Miranda, known as just Ismael, is a Brazilian professional football defender.
