= Christian Nielsen (footballer) =

Danish footballer (born 1985)

Personal information
- Full name: Christian Nielsen
- Date of birth: March 24, 1985 (age 41)
- Place of birth: Denmark
- Height: 1.88 m (6 ft 2 in)
- Positions: Defender; midfielder

Youth career
- Herfølge BK

Senior career*
| Years | Team | Apps | (Gls) |
| 2004–2007 | Herfølge BK | | |
| 2007–2009 | FC Nordsjælland | 20 | (1) |
| 2010–2012 | Stenløse BK | | |
| 2012 | Fremad Amager | | |
| 2012–2014 | B93 | | |
- * Club domestic league appearances and goals

Christian Nielsen (born 24 March 1985), nicknamed Krølle (English: Curly), is a Danish former football player.

Coming from Herfølge BK on July 1, 2007, he has mostly been used as a marginal player not having his final breakthrough, however, being a versatile player, he has played some games now on different positions on the field - mainly defence and midfield.

He left FC Nordsjælland in 2009.
