= Mohammed Abdalas =

Danish-Moroccan footballer (born 1986)

Personal information
- Full name: Mohammed Abdalas
- Date of birth: 26 October 1986 (age 40)
- Place of birth: Denmark
- Height: 1.75 m (5 ft 9 in)
- Position: Midfielder

Team information
- Current team: AB Tårnby (manager)

Youth career
- Fremad Amager

Senior career*
Years	Team	Apps	(Gls)
2004–2008	Fremad Amager		
2008–2009	FC Amager	9	(2)
2009	Nordsjælland	1	(0)
2009	Vanløse		
2009–2010	Kristianstad		
2010	Hvidovre	10	(0)
2010–2018	Fremad Amager		

Managerial career
- 2018–2024: Fremad Amager (youth)
- 2024–: AB Tårnby
- * Club domestic league appearances and goals

Mohammed Abdalas (born 26 October 1986) is a Danish-Moroccan retired professional footballer who played as a midfielder. He is currently the manager of AB Tårnby.

He made one appearance for FC Nordsjælland in the Danish Superliga. It came on 9 May 2009 in a 3–1 defeat at F.C. Copenhagen.
