= Bo Storm =

Danish footballer and manager (born 1987)

Personal information
- Full name: Bo Storm
- Date of birth: 3 February 1987 (age 39)
- Place of birth: Nordborg, Denmark
- Height: 1.71 m (5 ft 7 in)
- Position: Attacking midfielder

Team information
- Current team: FC Roskilde (assistant)

Youth career
- –2003: AGF
- 2003–2005: Heerenveen

Senior career*
Years	Team	Apps	(Gls)
2005–2007	Heerenveen	3	(0)
2007–2009	FC Nordsjælland	24	(1)
2009–2010	Pergocrema	14	(0)
2010–2013	HB Køge	72	(10)
2013–2016	SønderjyskE	9	(1)
2016–2018	FC Roskilde	22	(1)

International career
2002	Denmark U16	3	(0)
2003–2004	Denmark U17	21	(2)
2004	Denmark U18	2	(0)
2006	Denmark U20	2	(0)
2006–2008	Denmark U21	8	(2)

Managerial career
- 2018–: FC Roskilde (assistant)
- * Club domestic league appearances and goals

Bo Storm (born 3 February 1987 in Nordborg) is a Danish retired footballer, who currently is the assistant manager of Danish 1st Division club FC Roskilde.

== Career ==
He has played several games for the Danish youth national teams (U-16, U-17, U-18, U-20 and U-21). Storm played youth football with AGF Aarhus, but began his career in a small town club called Odder. He joined SC Heerenveen in 2003 and currently plays for Danish side FC Roskilde.

On 11 December 2015 it was confirmed, that Storm would leave SønderjyskE at the end of the year.
