= Jesper Lange =

Danish footballer (born 1986)

Personal information
- Date of birth: 11 January 1986 (age 40)
- Place of birth: Marstal, Denmark
- Height: 1.78 m (5 ft 10 in)
- Position: Forward

Team information
- Current team: Esbjerg fB (backroom staff)

Youth career
- Tarup-Paarup IF
- B 1913
- OB

Senior career*
Years	Team	Apps	(Gls)
2004–2006	OB	3	(0)
2006–2013	Esbjerg fB	184	(42)
2013–2016	AGF	72	(8)
2016–2017	Helsingborgs IF	25	(7)
2018–2019	Ringkøbing	13	(5)
2019	Middelfart	4	(1)
2020–2021	Sædding/Guldager		

International career
2007–2008	Denmark U-21	10	(1)

Managerial career
- 2018–2019: Ringkøbing (player-assistant)
- 2022: Esbjerg fB (U19 assistant)
- 2022–: Esbjerg fB (backroom staff)
- * Club domestic league appearances and goals as of 23:44, 11 May 2019 (UTC)

Jesper Lange (born 11 January 1986) is a Danish former professional football forward.

== Career ==
Jesper Lange signed with Esbjerg fB in the summer of 2006.

From 1. Juli he will play for AGF on a 3-year deal.

On 1 August 2018, Lange signed with Danish 2nd Division club Ringkøbing IF as a playing assistant coach. He left the club on 23 January 2019 by mutual termination.

He then signed with Middelfart G&BK on 29 January 2019. 33-year-old Lange announced on 6 January 2020, that he would retire and that his body had said stop after three surgeries as a result of a cruciate ligament injury he suffered two and a half years ago.

=== Later career ===
After retiring from professional football, Lange returned to Esbjerg to play for Danish amateur club Sædding/Guldager IF in the Jutland Series in March 2020, where former professional Tommy Løvenkrands also was playing. Lange would also function as an individual coach for Sædding/Guldager IF and was also affiliated with Esbjerg fB's academy, where he took on a role as an individual coach.

On 1 February 2022, Esbjerg fB confirmed that Lange had been promoted to U19 assistant. Besides that, he would also function as an individual and offensive coach for the academy teams. Esbjerg announces that Lange would join the first team coaching staff of the club, where he would have a special focus on the offensive and some individual training. The former striker would also be assigned as transition coach, where his task would be to make the transition from youth to senior easier for the club's talents.

On 6 August 2024, 38-year-old Lange was part of Esbjerg's squad for a Danish Cup match against Fredericia fF.
