= Alexander Fischer =

Danish footballer (born 1986)

Personal information
- Date of birth: 16 September 1986 (age 40)
- Place of birth: Holte, Denmark
- Height: 1.76 m (5 ft 9 1/2 in)
- Position: Right-back

Team information
- Current team: Young Boys FD (Manager)

Youth career
- 199?–1997: B82 Virum
- 1997–2005: Lyngby

Senior career*
Years	Team	Apps	(Gls)
2005–2009	Lyngby	41	(0)
2009–2017	Randers	240	(10)
2017–2021	Viborg	101	(1)
2021–2022	Skive	31	(0)

Managerial career
- 2021–2022: Skive (player-assistant)
- 2022–2023: Skive
- 2023–: Young Boys FD
- * Club domestic league appearances and goals

Alexander Fischer (born 16 September 1986) is a Danish retired professional footballer who played as a right-back and current manager of Young Boys FD. He has been used more as a winger after he moved to Randers FC. In Lyngby he was used as a full back.
