= Henrik Toft =

Danish footballer (born 1981)

Personal information
- Full name: Henrik Toft
- Date of birth: 15 April 1981 (age 45)
- Place of birth: Christiansfeld, Denmark
- Height: 1.96 m (6 ft 5 in)
- Position: Striker

Team information
- Current team: Kolding BK

Youth career
- Haderslev

Senior career*
Years	Team	Apps	(Gls)
1996–2002	Haderslev	61	(23)
2002–2004	Lyngby BK	24	(13)
2004–2005	Fremad Amager	45	(18)
2005–2007	Vejle BK	32	(7)
2007–2009	Herfølge BK	43	(22)
2009–2010	HB Køge	33	(7)
2010–2011	OB	25	(2)
2011–2014	AC Horsens	67	(11)
2014–	Kolding BK		

International career
2002	Denmark U-20	4	(1)
- * Club domestic league appearances and goals as of 11 March 2015

Henrik Toft (born 15 April 1981) is a Danish professional footballer, who currently plays for club Kolding BK.

Toft is a striker with a height of 1.96 meters and heading ability.

== Honours ==
- 2005 Danish 1st Division Player of the Year
