= Alex Nørlund =

Danish footballer (born 1975)

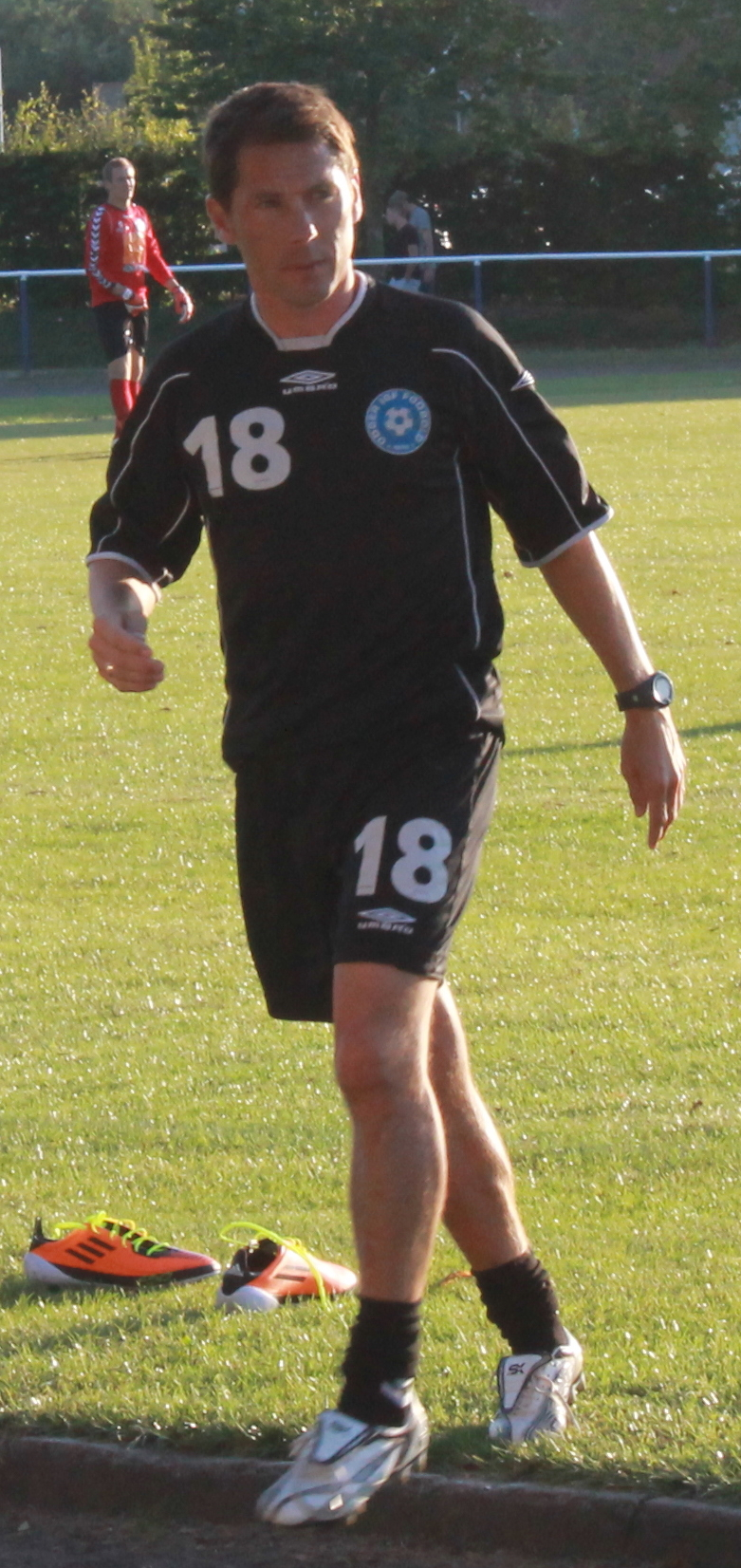

Personal information
- Full name: Alex Nørlund Andersen
- Date of birth: 28 January 1975 (age 51)
- Place of birth: Denmark
- Height: 1.67 m (5 ft 5 1/2 in)
- Position: Midfielder

Team information
- Current team: Vejle Boldklub II (manager)

Youth career
- Jelling IF

Senior career*
Years	Team	Apps	(Gls)
1993–1999	Vejle Boldklub	117	(20)
1999–2001	Viborg FF	54	(7)
2001–2002	Vejle Boldklub	31	(9)
2002–2004	Aarhus GF	38	(3)
2004–2006	Viborg FF	62	(6)
2006–2009	Vejle Boldklub	56	(4)

International career
1995–1997	Denmark under-21	6	(2)

Managerial career
- 2013: Odder IGF
- 2014–2018: Hedensted IF
- 2019–: Vejle Boldklub (II)
- * Club domestic league appearances and goals

Alex Nørlund Andersen (born 28 January 1975) is a Danish former football player in the attacking midfielder position. He played 229 games for Vejle Boldklub, and also represented Danish Superliga clubs Viborg FF and AGF, winning the 2000 Danish Cup with Viborg. He played six games and scored two goals for the Denmark national under-21 football team.

== Biography ==
Norlund started playing youth football for Jelling IF, before becoming a part of the youth team setup at Vejle Boldklub (VB). He made his debut for VB in a June 1993 game against the Zambian national team, and was called up for the Danish under-21 national team in March 1995. With VB, Norlund attempted to gain promotion for the top-flight Danish Superliga. This was accomplished when the club finished second in the 1995 Danish 1st Division season, with Norlund and Jesper Søgaard the brightest talents of the team.

In VB's first season in the Superliga, Norlund suffered an inflammation in his knee, and spent almost a year in recovery. He returned in January 1997, and scored a single goal as VB finished runners-up in the 1996-97 season. He was recalled for the Danish under-21 national team in May 1997, and scored two goals in four under-21 national team matches, before becoming too old to be eligible for the team.

Norlund played a further two seasons at VB, before his contract ran out in the summer 1999. He underwent training sessions with foreign teams Aris Thessaloniki (Greece), Brescia Calcio (Italy) and Grazer AK (Austria), but with no success. He stayed in Denmark, and moved to VB's league rivals Viborg FF on a free transfer in September 1999. He was a part of the Viborg team that won the 2000 Danish Cup, before his Viborg contract ran out in the summer 2001. He trained with English club Walsall F.C. without success in February 2001, before moving back to play for VB on a semi-professional contract in July 2001.

As VB were relegated to the Danish 1st Division in the 2001-02 season, Norlund moved to Superliga club Aarhus GF (AGF). Following less and less playing time for AGF, his contract was mutually terminated in March 2004, and Norlund moved to his former club Viborg as an amateur player. After three months as an amateur player, Norlund penned a two-year professional contract with Viborg in June 2004. He soon found a place in Viborg's starting line-up, and became the natural playmaker of the team. When VB won promotion for the 2006-07 Superliga season, Norlund moved back to his childhood club. As his VB contract was not renewed in the summer 2009, he chose to end his footballing career.

== Honours ==
Viborg FF

- Danish Cup
  - 1999–2000
- Danish Super Cup
  - 2000
