= AB Tårnby =

Association football club in Denmark

- Full name: Amager Boldklub Tårnby
- Founded: 1 January 2009; 17 years ago
- Ground: Tårnby Stadium
- Capacity: 10,000 (350 seated)
- Chairman: Daniel Sandal Gadegaard
- Head coach: Mohammed Abdalas
- League: Denmark Series
- 2024–25: Denmark Series Group 1, 4th of 10; Promotion Group 1, 10th of 10
- Website: http://www.abtaarnby.dk/
Home colours	Away colours

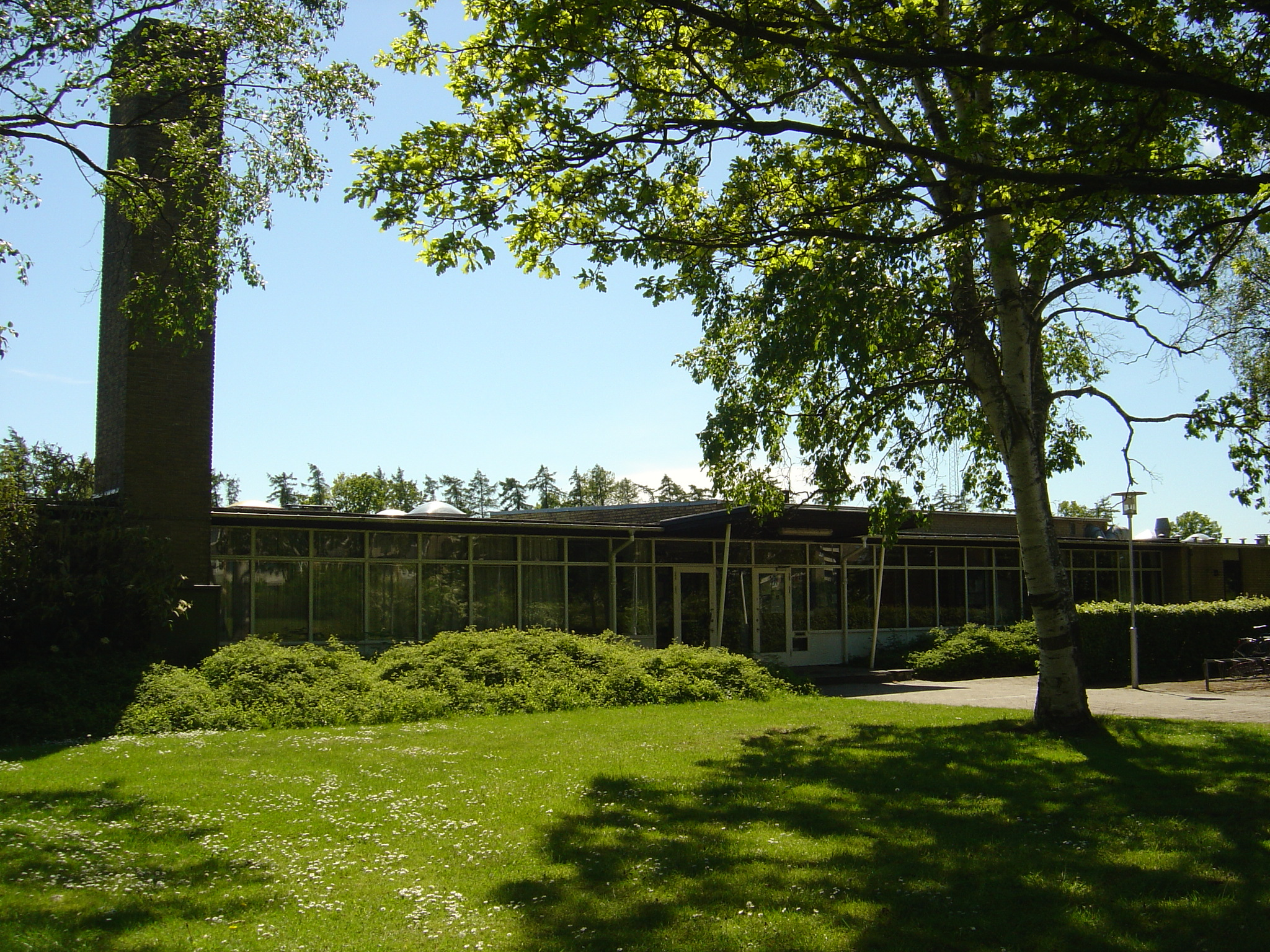
Tårnby Boldklub members' building before the merger in May 2007 located at Tårnby Stadium.

Amager Boldklub Tårnby (Danish pronunciation: [ˈɑˌmɑˀ ˈpʌlˀtkʰlup ˈtsʰɒːnˌpyˀ]; commonly known as AB Tårnby) is an association football club based in the town of Tårnby, Capital Region of Denmark, Denmark, that competes in the Denmark Series, the fifth tier of the Danish football league system. Founded in 2009 as a merger between Tårnby Boldklub and AB 70, it is affiliated to the regional football association, DBU Copenhagen. The team plays its home matches at Tårnby Stadium where it has been based since its foundation. The stadium has a capacity of 10,000.

== History ==
On 1 January 2009, Tårnby Boldklub merged with neighboring Amager Boldklub af 1970 (AB70), and the new association was named AB Tårnby. In the 2019–20 Denmark Series, AB Tårnby ended first in their respective group. In June 2020, after the season was resumed following the COVID-19 pandemic, AB Tårnby played two promotion matches with the second position team Karlslunde IF. AB Tårnby tied their first match against Karlslunde but won the second match 2–1 at their home ground earning them promotion to the Danish 2nd Division.

== Honours ==
=== Domestic ===
==== National leagues ====
- Denmark Series
  - Winners (1) 2014–15 (q)
  - Winners (1): 2019–20 (q)
