= Nexø Boldklub Bornholm =

Danish football club

NB Bornholm
- Full name: Nexø Boldklub Bornholm
- Nickname(s): NB Bornholm
- Founded: 1990; 35 years ago
- Ground: Nexø Stadion, Nexø
- Capacity: 3,000
- Chairman: Anders Jørgensen
- Manager: Thomas Jørgensen
- League: Copenhagen Series
- 2024–25: Copenhagen Series, 5th of 14
Home colours	Away colours

Nexø Boldklub Bornholm (NB Bornholm) is a Danish football club based in Nexø on the island of Bornholm. Founded in 1915 as Nexø Boldklub and re-formed in 1990 following bankruptcy, the club has since competed under its present name from 2009. They play in the Copenhagen Series, the sixth tier of the Danish league system, and host home matches at Nexø Stadion, which has a capacity of around 5,000. NB Bornholm's peak in the national pyramid was a campaign in the third-tier Danish 2nd Division in 2012–13 after a rapid rise through the regional ranks. During that campaign, the squad included Malawi international defender Clement Kafwafwa.
