= Værløse Boldklub =

Danish football club

Værløse
- Full name: Værløse Boldklub
- Founded: 1950
- Ground: Værløse Stadium, Værløse
- Capacity: 1,500
- Chairman: Søren Jensen
- Manager: Martin Beck
- League: DBU Zealand Series 1
- 2023–24: DBU Zealand Series 1, Group 1, 5th of 14
- Website: vbold.dk
Home colours	Away colours

Værløse Boldklub (Danish pronunciation: [ˈvɛɐ̯ˌløːsə ˈpʌlˀtkʰlup]; also known as Værløse BK) is a Danish football club based in the town of Værløse. They play in the seventh-tier Series 1 and their home field is the 1,500 capacity Værløse Stadium.

== History ==
Værløse Boldklub was originally part of IF Værløse, which was founded in 1924. The association football branch was founded in 1950. Værløse Stadium, where the team practice and have their home matches, is centrally located in the townnear Værløsehallerne and is also called "Daugaard Grounds" after the club's first honorary member field inspector Ejvind Daugaard.

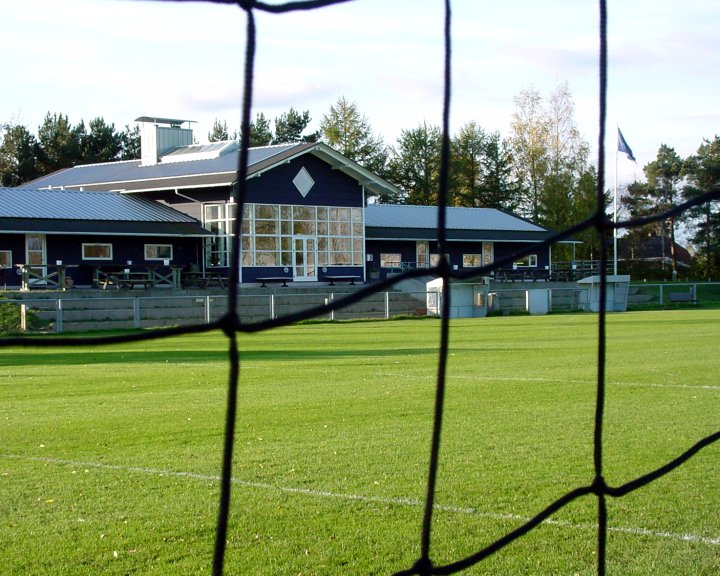
Værløse Stadium

From 2000, the club won three promotions in a row, from Series 1 (2000) via the Zealand Series (2001), ultimately reaching the Denmark Series for the first time in club history after a decisive match against Lyngby Boldklub. After that, they stayed in the Denmark Series for a year, after which they won another promotion and moved up to the Danish 2nd Division in 2004. The club's first season in the third best tier ended with a last place, but due to a restructuring of Danish divisions, they remained in the division. Head coach Finn Christoffersen and assistant coach Jens Jørgensen, led the team through promotions, and were later succeeded by former Brøndby IF profile and Denmark national team player Bent "Turbo" Christensen.

Since the early 2000s, Værløse slid down the divisions again. In June 2009, the club suffered relegation to the Denmark Series, and they have since settled in Series 1.
