= Nordvest FC =

Danish football club

- Full name: Nordvest FC
- Short name: NvFC
- Founded: 2008
- Dissolved: 2014
- Ground: Holbæk Stadion, Holbæk
- Capacity: 10,500
- Chairman: Steen Juul
- Head Coach: Mogens Krogh
- League: Danish 2nd Division East
- 2013–14: Danish 2nd Division East, 6th
Home colours	Away colours

Nordvest FC was a Danish association football club. They played their home matches at Holbæk Stadion in Holbæk, which has a capacity of 10,000 (1,100 seats). Nordvest FC was the professional structure comprising the first team of the mother club, Holbæk B&I (HB&I), and officially took effect on July 1, 2008. The professional structure was abandoned in June 2014 and the first team of the club went back to using the original name, Holbæk B&I.

In 2009, the club managed to qualify for the Danish Cup Semifinal as an amateur team by beating the top flight teams SønderjyskE in the earlier rounds and AC Horsens in the quarterfinal. They lost the semifinal to FC København 6-1 over two legs.

== Current squad ==
Up to date as of 2012-01-05

Note: Flags indicate national team as defined under FIFA eligibility rules; some limited exceptions apply. Players may hold more than one non-FIFA nationality.

No.	Pos.	Nation	Player
1	GK	DEN	Lasse Sømmergaard
2	DF	DEN	Kristoffer Dirksen
3	DF	DEN	Andreas Elkjær
5	DF	DEN	Mathias Lysgaard
6	DF	DEN	Andreas Holm
7	MF	DEN	Rasmus Lundberg
8	MF	DEN	Kristian Holm
9	FW	DEN	Martin Koch
10	MF	DEN	Thomas Jensen
11	FW	PAK	Hassan Bashir
13	FW	DEN	Mikkelm Vestergaard
14	FW	DEN	Mohammed Ashrihi

No.	Pos.	Nation	Player
16	GK	DEN	Christian Mortensen
17	MF	DEN	Ferdinand Bangsgaard
18	FW	DEN	Ricki Olsen
19	DF	DEN	Mads Bøjesen
20	DF	DEN	Birol Serinkanli
22	DF	DEN	Frederik Tingager
