= Gentofte-Vangede Idrætsforening =

Danish football club

GVI
- Full name: Gentofte-Vangede Idrætsforening
- Short name: GVI
- Founded: 21 August 1921; 104 years ago
- Ground: Nymosen, Vangede
- Capacity: 100
- Chairman: Jesper Sørensen
- Head coach: Søren Fjorting
- League: Denmark Series (V)
- 2023–24: Copenhagen Series, 1st of 14 (promoted)
- Website: http://www.gvi-fodbold.dk
Traditional colours

Gentofte-Vangede Idrætsforening (commonly known as GVI) is a Danish football club based in the Copenhagen suburban area Vangede. The club was founded 21 August 1921 and has since the foundation been playing at Nymosen Sports Park. The club was founded as merger between Gentofte Boldklub and Vangede Idrætsforening before the start of the 1921–22 tournament administrated by the Zealand Football Association (SBU). The founding clubs had previously been part of Nordre Birks Boldspil-Union and Københavns Forstadsklubbers Bold Union (KFBU), before being accepted as members of SBU during a general meeting on 29 May 1921.

The club is currently playing in the Denmark Series.
