= List of Danish footballers =

This is a list of Danish association football players:

Contents:	Top - A B C D E F G H I J K L M N O P Q R S T U V W X Y Z

== A ==
- Kim Aabech
- Johan Absalonsen
- Daniel Agger
- Nicolaj Agger
- Muhammed Akinci
- Martin Albrechtsen
- Steffen Algreen
- Iddi Alkhag
- Erik Bo Andersen
- Henrik Andersen
- Jesper Andersen
- Søren Andersen
- Stephan Andersen
- Thomas Andie
- Casper Ankergren
- Lasse Ankjær
- Frank Arnesen
- Jens Berthel Askou
- Thomas Augustinussen
- Yasin Avcı

== B ==
- Kristian Bak Nielsen
- Ronni Bagge
- Ruben Bagger
- Ulrik Balling
- Jesper Bech
- Tommy Bechmann
- Mikkel Beck
- Nicklas Bendtner
- Martin Bergvold
- Martin Bernburg
- Mathias Bersang Sørensen
- Jacob Berthelsen
- Morten Bertolt
- Mikkel Bischoff
- Martin Borre
- Jonas Borring
- Martin Braithwaite
- Jeppe Brandrup
- Kenneth Brylle Larsen
- Simon Bræmer

== C ==
- Dennis Cagara
- Kim Christensen (born 1979, goalkeeper)
- Kim Christensen (born 1980, forward)
- René Christensen
- Søren Christensen
- Jesper Christiansen (forward)
- Jesper Christiansen (goalkeeper)
- Peter Christiansen
- Søren Colding
- Jeppe Curth
- Morten Cramer

== D ==
- Thomas Dalgaard
- Kaspar Dalgas
- Rebekka Danielsen
- Kim Daugaard
- Rasmus Daugaard
- Peter Degn
- Willads Delvin

== E ==
- Ronnie Ekelund
- Preben Elkjær
- Thomas Enevoldsen
- Christian Eriksen
- Steffen Ernemann

== F ==
- Jamil Fearrington
- Christian Flindt Bjerg
- Dennis Flinta
- Per Frandsen
- Thomas Frandsen
- Carsten Fredgaard
- Søren Friis
- Viktor Fischer

== G ==
- Thomas Gaardsøe
- Per Gade
- Benny Gall
- Jakob Glerup
- Bjarne Goldbæk
- Thomas Gravesen
- Michael Gravgaard
- Rasmus Grønborg Hansen
- Jesper Grønkjær
- Thomas Guldborg Christensen
- Peter Graulund

== H ==
- Martin Halle
- Esben Hansen
- Frank Hansen
- Jesper Hansen
- Michael Hansen
- Nikolaj Hansen
- Rasmus Hansen
- Lasse Heinze
- Martin Heinze
- Thomas Helveg
- Casper Henningsen
- René Henriksen
- Mads Hermansen
- Jan Hoffmann
- Lars Høgh
- Nicolai Høgh
- Steffen Højer
- Rasmus Højlund
- Søren Holdgaard
- Lasse Holmgaard
- Thorbjørn Holst Rasmussen
- Nikolaj Hust
- Dennis Høegh

== I ==
- Mads Ibenfeldt
- Gustav Isaksen

== J ==
- Anders Post Jacobsen
- Casper Jacobsen
- Lars Jacobsen
- Michael Jakobsen
- Claus Jensen
- Daniel Jensen (defender)
- Daniel Jensen (midfielder)
- Jonas Jensen
- Lars Jensen
- Martin S. Jensen
- Mike Jensen
- Søren Jensen
- Leon Jessen
- Søren Jochumsen
- Karsten Johansen
- Ulrik Johansen
- Jesper Jørgensen
- Mads Jørgensen
- Martin Jørgensen
- Nicolai Jørgensen

== K ==
- Klaus Kærgård
- Thomas Kahlenberg
- Morten Karlsen
- Steffen Kielstrup
- Henrik Kildentoft
- Kristian Kirk
- Kasper Klausen
- Thomas Kortegaard
- Bjørn Kristensen
- Frank Kristensen
- Kim Kristensen
- Patrick Kristensen
- Thomas Kristensen
- Jan Kristiansen
- Søren Krogh
- Per Krøldrup
- Lasse Kronborg
- William Kvist

== L ==
- Jesper Lange
- Lars Larsen
- Michael Larsen
- Brian Laudrup
- Finn Laudrup
- Michael Laudrup
- Martin Laursen
- Ulrik Laursen
- Rajko Lekic
- Anders Lindegaard
- Ulrik Lindkvist
- Thomas Lindrup
- Niels Lodberg
- Kasper Lorentzen
- Peter Løvenkrands
- Tommy Løvenkrands
- Jerry Lucena
- Mathias Lykke Hansen

== M ==
- Claus Madsen
- Rasmus Marvits
- Jesper Mikkelsen
- Patrick Mtiliga
- Jan Mølby
- Peter Møller
- Anders Møller Christensen
- Kenneth Møller Pedersen
- Simon Makienok (born 1990, striker)

== N ==
- Simon Nagel
- Allan Nielsen
- Brian Nielsen
- David Nielsen
- Jesper Nielsen
- Jimmy Nielsen
- Kent Nielsen
- Lars Christian Nielsen
- Lasse Nielsen
- Per Nielsen
- Peter Nielsen
- Anders Nøhr
- Morten Nordstrand
- Alex Nørlund
- Hjalte Nørregaard
- Peter Nymann

== O ==
- Allan Olesen
- Allan Arenfeldt Olesen
- Jacob Olesen
- Jesper Olesen
- Christian Olsen
- Danny Olsen
- Kenni Olsen
- Kim Olsen
- Lars Olsen
- Marc Olsen
- Morten Olsen
- Martin Ørnskov Nielsen

== P ==
- Søren Pallesen
- Henrik Pedersen
- Martin Pedersen (defender)
- Simon Azoulay Pedersen
- Søren Pedersen
- René Petersen
- Stephan Petersen
- Kenneth Perez
- Sladan Peric
- Christian Poulsen
- Christopher Poulsen
- Jakob Poulsen
- Simon Poulsen
- Brian Priske

== Q ==
- Lasse Qvist
- Ole Qvist

== R ==
- Nick Ragus
- Mikkel Rask
- Anders Rasmussen
- David Rasmussen
- Morten "Duncan" Rasmussen (striker)
- Morten Rasmussen (defender)
- Steffen Rasmussen
- Theis F. Rasmussen
- Thomas Rasmussen
- Thomas Raun
- Martin Retov
- Michael Ribers
- Jonathan Richter
- Simon Richter
- Søren Rieks
- Mads Rieper
- Kasper Risgård
- Thomas Røll
- Dennis Rommedahl
- Thomas Rytter

== S ==
- Ebbe Sand
- John Sandberg
- Mathias Sauer
- Kasper Schmeichel
- Peter Schmeichel
- Stefan Schmidt
- Ronnie Schwartz
- Thomas Seidelin
- Asbjørn Sennels
- Michael Silberbauer
- Christian Sivebæk
- Morten Skoubo
- Henrik Smedegaard
- Martin Spelmann
- Allan Søgaard
- Chris Sørensen
- Dennis Sørensen
- Jacob Sørensen (born 1983)
- Jacob Sørensen (born 1998)
- Jan Sørensen
- Jens-Kristian Sørensen
- Kenneth Sørensen
- Thomas Sørensen
- Kris Stadsgaard
- Kenneth Stenild
- Kevin Stuhr Ellegaard
- Sebastian Svärd
- Bo Svensson

== T ==
- Thomas Tengstedt
- Dan Thomassen
- Mikkel Thygesen
- Mads Timm
- Henrik Toft
- Stig Tøfting
- Jon Dahl Tomasson
- Mads Toppel
- Michael Tørnes
- Mads Torry
- Christian Traoré
- Magnus Troest

== U ==
- Mikael Uhre
- Kaj Uldaler
- Iørn Uldbjerg
- Einer Ulrich

== V ==
- Mikkel Vendelbo
- Søren Ulrik Vestergaard
- Thomas Villadsen
- Martin Vingaard
- Ulrich Vinzents

== W ==
- Morten Wieghorst
- Lars Winde
- Rasmus Würtz

== Y ==
- Sammy Youssouf

== Z ==
- Niki Zimling
- Bora Zivkovic

== See also ==
- Danish Football Hall of Fame
