= 2008–09 Danish Superliga =

19th season of Danish Superliga

Danish Superliga
- Season: 2008–09
- Champions: F.C. Copenhagen; 7th Superliga title 7th top-flight Danish title
- Relegated: Vejle Boldklub; AC Horsens
- Champions League: F.C. Copenhagen
- Europa League: Odense BK; Brøndby IF; AaB (via domestic cup); Randers (via Fair Play)
- Goals: 544
- Average goals/game: 2.75
- Top goalscorer: Morten Nordstrand; Marc Nygaard (16 goals both)
- Biggest home win: Nordsjælland 6–1 Randers (10 April 2009); Odense 6–1 AGF (4 May 2009)
- Biggest away win: SønderjyskE 0–6 Brøndby (22 November 2008)
- Highest scoring: Brøndby 4–3 AC Horsens (3 November 2008); F.C. Copenhagen 5–2 AC Horsens (7 December 2008); Nordsjælland 6–1 Randers (10 April 2009); Odense 6–1 AGF (4 May 2009) (7 goals)
- Longest winning run: 5 – Odense BK (6 April to 23 April 2009) and Randers FC (13 April to 3 May 2009)
- Longest unbeaten run: 12 – Odense BK (6 April to 31 May 2009), Brøndby IF (31 August to 6 December 2008) and AaB (10 September 2008 to 5 April 2009)
- Longest losing run: 6 – SønderjyskE (22 March to 22 April 2009)
- Highest attendance: 32,856 – F.C. Copenhagen v Randers (31 May 2009)
- Lowest attendance: 1,609 – SønderjyskE v Midtjylland (7 December 2008)
- Average attendance: 8,814

The 2008–09 Danish Superliga was the 19th season of Danish Superliga league championship, which determines the winners of the Danish football championship, governed by the Danish Football Association. The season started on 19 July 2008 and ended on 31 May 2009. The defending champions were Aalborg BK.

The Danish champions qualified for the 2009–10 UEFA Champions League qualifying round. Runners-up and 3rd placed team qualified for 2009–10 UEFA Europa League qualifying rounds. 11th and 12th placed teams were relegated to the 1st Division. The 1st Division champions and runners-up were promoted to the Superliga.

== Promotion and relegation ==
The following teams were promoted to Superliga after the end of the 2007–08 season:

- Vejle BK (winners)
- SønderjyskE (runners-up)

The following teams were relegated from Superliga after the end of the 2007–08 season:

- Viborg FF (11th placed)
- Lyngby BK (12th placed)

== Participating clubs ==
Location of teams in Danish Superliga 2008–09

| Club | Finishing position the previous season | First season in top division | First season of current spell in top division |
|---|---|---|---|
| AaB | 1st | 1928–29 | 1987 |
| AC Horsens | 5th | 1929–30 | 2005–06 |
| AGF | 10th | 1918–19 | 2007–08 |
| Brøndby IF | 8th | 1982 | 1982 |
| Esbjerg fB | 7th | 1928–29 | 2001–02 |
| F.C. Copenhagen | 3rd | 1992–93 | 1992–93 |
| FC Midtjylland | 2nd | 2000–01 | 2000–01 |
| FC Nordsjælland | 9th | 2002–03 | 2002–03 |
| OB | 4th | 1927–28 | 1999–2000 |
| Randers FC | 6th | 1941–42 | 2006–07 |
| SønderjyskE | 2nd in 1st Division | 2000–01 | 2008–09 |
| Vejle BK | 1st in 1st Division | 1940–41 | 2008–09 |

== Stadia and locations ==
| Team | City | Stadium | Capacity |
|---|---|---|---|
| AaB | Aalborg | Energi Nord Arena | 13,800 |
| AC Horsens | Horsens | Casa Arena Horsens | 8,000 |
| AGF | Aarhus | NRGi Park | 21,000 |
| Brøndby IF | Brøndby | Brøndby Stadium | 29,000 |
| Esbjerg fB | Esbjerg | Blue Water Arena | 18,000 |
| F.C. Copenhagen | Copenhagen | Parken Stadium | 34,098 |
| FC Midtjylland | Herning | SAS Arena | 11,809 |
| FC Nordsjælland | Farum | Farum Park | 10,000 |
| OB | Odense | Fionia Park | 15,761 |
| Randers FC | Randers | Essex Park Randers | 12,000 |
| SønderjyskE | Haderslev | Haderslev Fodboldstadion | 10,000 |
| Vejle BK | Vejle | Vejle Stadion | 10,500 |

== Managerial changes ==
| Team | Outgoing manager | Manner of departure | Date of vacancy | Replaced by | Date of appointment | Position in table |
|---|---|---|---|---|---|---|
| AaB | (Sweden) Erik Hamrén | End of contract | 30 June 2008 | (Scotland) Bruce Rioch | 1 July 2008 | Pre-season |
| FC Midtjylland | (Denmark) Erik Rasmussen | Resigned | 30 June 2008 | (Denmark) Thomas Thomasberg | 1 July 2008 | Pre-season |
| AaB | (Scotland) Bruce Rioch | Sacked | 23 October 2008 | (Sweden) Magnus Pehrsson | 1 January 2009 | 11th |
| Esbjerg fB | (Denmark) Troels Bech | Sacked | 16 November 2008 | (Denmark) Ove Pedersen | 1 January 2009 | 12th |
| Brøndby IF | (Denmark) Tom Køhlert | Mutual consent | 31 December 2008 | (Denmark) Kent Nielsen | 1 January 2009 | 1st |
| AC Horsens | (Denmark) Kent Nielsen | Resigned | 31 December 2008 | (Denmark) Henrik Jensen | 1 January 2009 | 12th |
| AGF | (Denmark) Ove Pedersen | Sacked | 31 December 2008 | (Denmark) Erik Rasmussen | 1 January 2009 | 5th |
| Randers FC | (England) Colin Todd | Mutual consent | 5 January 2009 | (Denmark) John Jensen | 5 January 2009 | 7th |
| Vejle BK | (Denmark) Ove Christensen | Sacked | 17 March 2009 | (Sweden) Mats Gren | 1 July 2009 | 12th |

== League table ==
| Pos | Team | Pld | W | D | L | GF | GA | GD | Pts | Qualification or relegation |
|---|---|---|---|---|---|---|---|---|---|---|
| 1 | Copenhagen (C) | 33 | 23 | 5 | 5 | 67 | 26 | +41 | 74 | Qualification to Champions League second qualifying round |
| 2 | Odense | 33 | 21 | 6 | 6 | 65 | 31 | +34 | 69 | Qualification to Europa League third qualifying round (Note: Because F.C. Copenhagen, winners of 2008–09 Danish Cup, also won the league, Odense BK as league runners-up earned a spot in the third while cup runners-up AaB qualified for the second qualifying round of the UEFA Europa League.) |
| 3 | Brøndby | 33 | 21 | 5 | 7 | 55 | 31 | +24 | 68 | Qualification to Europa League second qualifying round |
| 4 | Midtjylland | 33 | 16 | 7 | 10 | 55 | 46 | +9 | 55 | |
| 5 | Randers | 33 | 11 | 13 | 9 | 52 | 50 | +2 | 46 | Qualification to Europa League first qualifying round (Note: Denmark was ranked second in the UEFA Fair Play Ranking and thereby earned an additional Europa League spot, with the winners of national Fair Play competition entering in the first qualifying round of the UEFA Europa League. That spot was granted to Randers FC because they were the best team in the national Fair Play competition which has not already qualified for Europe.) |
| 6 | Aarhus | 33 | 13 | 6 | 14 | 39 | 44 | −5 | 45 | |
| 7 | Aalborg | 33 | 9 | 12 | 12 | 40 | 49 | −9 | 39 | Qualification to Europa League second qualifying round |
| 8 | Nordsjælland | 33 | 9 | 8 | 16 | 44 | 53 | −9 | 35 | |
| 9 | Esbjerg | 33 | 7 | 11 | 15 | 32 | 41 | −9 | 32 | |
| 10 | SønderjyskE | 33 | 5 | 13 | 15 | 30 | 56 | −26 | 28 | |
| 11 | Vejle (R) | 33 | 4 | 13 | 16 | 30 | 59 | −29 | 25 | Relegation to Danish 1st Division |
| 12 | Horsens (R) | 33 | 5 | 9 | 19 | 35 | 58 | −23 | 24 | Relegation to Danish 1st Division |

Source: Danish Superliga
Rules for classification: 1) points; 2) goal difference; 3) number of goals scored
(C) Champions; (R) Relegated

== Results ==
=== Matchday 1–11 ===
| Home \ Away | AaB | ACH | AGF | BIF | EfB | FCK | FCM | FCN | OB | RFC | SJE | VB |
|---|---|---|---|---|---|---|---|---|---|---|---|---|
| AaB | | 1–1 | 0–2 | | 1–1 | | 1–2 | 1–2 | 0–3 | | | |
| Horsens | | | | 0–1 | | 0–1 | | | 1–2 | 1–1 | 2–0 | 0–0 |
| AGF | | 3–1 | | 2–1 | | | | 0–3 | | | 2–1 | 2–1 |
| Brøndby | 2–1 | | | | 2–1 | 1–0 | 3–0 | | | 0–3 | | |
| Esbjerg fB | | 0–1 | 1–0 | | | | | 1–1 | | | 0–0 | 0–1 |
| Copenhagen | 3–0 | | 1–0 | | 1–0 | | 3–1 | 2–1 | 0–0 | | | |
| Midtjylland | | 2–1 | 2–1 | | 3–1 | | | 1–0 | 4–0 | | | 1–1 |
| Nordsjælland | | 3–1 | | 0–2 | | | | | | 1–1 | 0–2 | 2–1 |
| OB | | | 3–1 | 0–1 | 4–2 | | | 3–1 | | 2–1 | 2–0 | |
| Randers FC | 2–2 | | 3–1 | | 1–1 | 1–1 | 0–0 | | | | | 1–1 |
| SønderjyskE | 1–2 | | | 2–2 | | 1–1 | 1–1 | | | 1–0 | | |
| Vejle BK | 2–3 | | | 0–0 | | 0–3 | | | 1–3 | | 2–1 | |

Source: dbu.dk (in Danish)
Legend: Blue = home team win; Yellow = draw; Red = away team win.

=== Matchday 12–33 ===
| Home \ Away | AaB | ACH | AGF | BIF | EfB | FCK | FCM | FCN | OB | RFC | SJE | VB |
|---|---|---|---|---|---|---|---|---|---|---|---|---|
| AaB | | 2–2 | 1–1 | 0–0 | 2–1 | 3–1 | 3–2 | 1–1 | 0–1 | 1–2 | 1–1 | 0–0 |
| Horsens | 0–1 | | 1–1 | 3–0 | 1–1 | 0–2 | 2–3 | 2–3 | 2–1 | 2–2 | 0–3 | 0–0 |
| AGF | 1–2 | 1–0 | | 1–0 | 3–1 | 0–1 | 2–1 | 1–0 | 2–1 | 1–2 | 0–0 | 1–1 |
| Brøndby | 2–0 | 4–3 | 2–0 | | 1–0 | 0–1 | 2–4 | 2–1 | 0–0 | 3–0 | 5–1 | 2–0 |
| Esbjerg fB | 3–1 | 1–0 | 1–0 | 1–2 | | 0–1 | 1–0 | 1–2 | 1–2 | 2–2 | 0–0 | 3–2 |
| Copenhagen | 3–0 | 5–2 | 2–1 | 4–0 | 0–2 | | 2–1 | 3–1 | 2–1 | 3–3 | 4–0 | 4–1 |
| Midtjylland | 2–1 | 3–1 | 3–2 | 1–1 | 1–1 | 0–3 | | 3–0 | 1–1 | 0–2 | 2–4 | 2–0 |
| Nordsjælland | 2–2 | 1–2 | 0–0 | 1–2 | 1–1 | 0–3 | 0–2 | | 1–4 | 6–1 | 0–0 | 4–1 |
| OB | 1–1 | 2–1 | 6–1 | 0–1 | 2–1 | 3–2 | 2–1 | 3–0 | | 3–1 | 2–0 | 2–0 |
| Randers FC | 1–2 | 5–1 | 1–1 | 0–2 | 1–0 | 0–3 | 1–2 | 3–2 | 0–0 | | 3–1 | 3–2 |
| SønderjyskE | 1–1 | 2–0 | 0–3 | 0–6 | 1–1 | 1–2 | 0–0 | 1–3 | 1–1 | 1–4 | | 0–0 |
| Vejle BK | 0–3 | 1–1 | 2–1 | 1–3 | 1–1 | 1–1 | 2–3 | 1–1 | 0–5 | 1–1 | 3–2 | |

Source: dbu.dk (in Danish)
Legend: Blue = home team win; Yellow = draw; Red = away team win.

== Goals ==
Source: dbu.dk (in Danish)

=== Top goalscorers ===
| Pos | Player | Club | Goals |
|---|---|---|---|
| 1 | (Denmark) Morten Nordstrand | F.C. Copenhagen | 16 |
| 1 | (Denmark) Marc Nygaard | Randers FC | 16 |
| 3 | (Denmark) Frank Kristensen | FC Midtjylland | 15 |
| 4 | (Brazil) Gilberto Macena | AC Horsens | 12 |
| 4 | (Nigeria) Peter Utaka | OB | 12 |
| 6 | (Brazil) Aílton José Almeida | F.C. Copenhagen | 11 |
| 6 | (Denmark) Martin Bernburg | FC Nordsjælland | 11 |
| 6 | (Senegal) Baye Djiby Fall | OB | 11 |
| 6 | (Brazil) César Santín | F.C. Copenhagen | 11 |
| 10 | (Denmark) Søren Berg | Randers FC | 10 |
| 10 | (Denmark) Jonas Borring | FC Midtjylland | 10 |
| 10 | (Denmark) Bajram Fetai | FC Nordsjælland | 10 |

9 goals

- AGF: Peter Graulund
- Brøndby IF: Ousman Jallow, Morten "Duncan" Rasmussen
- OB: Hans Henrik Andreasen
- SønderjyskE: Ken Ilsø

8 goals

- AaB: Cacá
- Brøndby IF: Alexander Farnerud
- FC Nordsjælland: José Júnior
- Randers FC: Bédi Buval

7 goals

- Brøndby IF: Jan Kristiansen
- OB: Njogu Demba-Nyrén, Björn Runström

6 goals

- AaB: Andreas Johansson
- AGF: Jakob Poulsen
- FC Midtjylland: Danny Olsen
- FC Nordsjælland: Nicklas Pedersen

5 goals

- AaB: Thomas Augustinussen
- AGF: Nando Rafael, Dioh Williams
- Brøndby IF: Michael Krohn-Dehli, Samuel Holmén
- Esbjerg fB: Jesper Lange, Søren Rieks
- F.C. Copenhagen: Atiba Hutchinson
- FC Midtjylland: Mikkel Thygesen
- OB: Johan Absalonsen
- SønderjyskE: Jesper Kjærulff
- Vejle BK: Babajide Collins Babatunde, Brian Nielsen

4 goals

- AaB: Kasper Risgård
- AC Horsens: Besart Berisha, Rawez Lawan, Niels Lodberg
- Esbjerg fB: Jesper Bech, Samel Šabanović
- F.C. Copenhagen: William Kvist, Libor Sionko, Martin Vingaard
- FC Midtjylland: Jude Nworuh
- FC Nordsjælland: Jonathan Richter
- OB: Espen Ruud
- Randers FC: Tidiane Sane

3 goals

- AaB: Jeppe Curth, Marek Saganowski
- AGF: Jeremiah White
- Brøndby IF: Max von Schlebrügge
- Esbjerg fB: Jesper Jørgensen
- OB: Henrik Hansen, Chris Sørensen
- Randers FC: Rasmus Hansen, Ricki Olsen
- SønderjyskE: Kenneth Fabricius, John Jairo Mosquera, Sölvi Ottesen
- Vejle BK: Eduardo Delani, Steffen Kielstrup

2 goals

- AaB: Anders Due, Thomas Enevoldsen
- AC Horsens: Søren Friis, Casper Johansen
- AGF: Ole Budtz, Ulrik Lindkvist
- Brøndby IF: Kasper Lorentzen
- Esbjerg fB: Jeppe Mehl, Emmanuel Ukpai
- F.C. Copenhagen: Jesper Grønkjær, Dame N'Doye, Zdeněk Pospěch, Oscar Wendt
- FC Midtjylland: Kim Christensen, Winston Reid
- FC Nordsjælland: Søren Christensen
- Randers FC: Issah Ahmed, Mikkel Beckmann, Carsten Fredgaard, Kenneth Møller Pedersen
- SønderjyskE: Morten Bertolt
- Vejle BK: Valentino Lai, Ibrahim Salou

1 goal

- AaB: Michael Beauchamp, Luton Shelton, Marcus Tracy
- AC Horsens: Adam Eckersley, Thomas Kortegaard, Jimmy Mayasi, Simon Nagel, Kenneth Emil Petersen, Allan Søgaard
- AGF: Davit Devdariani, Frederik Krabbe, Michael Lumb, Dan Thomassen
- Brøndby IF: Stefán Gíslason, Peter Madsen, Thomas Rasmussen, Joseph Elanga
- Esbjerg fB: Kári Árnason, Gunnar Heiðar Þorvaldsson, Mikkel Vendelbo
- F.C. Copenhagen: Hjalte Nørregaard
- FC Midtjylland: Ken Fagerberg, Gheorghe Florescu, Christian Sivebæk
- FC Nordsjælland: Benjamin Kibebe, Henrik Kildentoft, Issey Nakajima-Farran, Stephan Petersen, Simon Richter
- OB: Eric Djemba-Djemba
- Randers FC: Tiago Targino
- SønderjyskE: Anders Egholm
- Vejle BK: Martin Borre, Adda Djeziri, Allan Gaarde, Adeshina Lawal, Sladan Peric, Pablo Piñones-Arce, Chidi Dauda Omeje, Thomas Røll, Rasmus Würtz, Bora Zivkovic

=== Own goals ===
- Frank Hansen (Esbjerg) for Vejle (27 July 2008)
- Sladan Peric (Vejle) for AaB (2 August 2008)
- Morten Rasmussen (Horsens) for Midtjylland (3 August 2008)
- Michael Beauchamp (AaB) for Copenhagen (21 September 2008)
- Alexander Östlund (Esbjerg) for OB (19 October 2008)
- Michael Stryger (SønderjyskE) for Randers (2 November 2008)
- Michael Jakobsen (AaB) for Esbjerg (16 November 2008)
- Jacob Stolberg (SønderjyskE) for Brøndby (22 November 2008)
- Søren Berg (Randers) for Brøndby (21 March 2009)
- Kristijan Ipša (Midtjylland) for AGF (13 April 2009)
- Adam Eckersley (Horsens) for Copenhagen (25 April 2009)
- Sölvi Ottesen (SønderjyskE) for Midtjylland (27 April 2009)

=== Hat-tricks ===
| Scorer | Game | Date |
|---|---|---|
| (Nigeria) Babajide Collins Babatunde | Midtjylland v OB | 10 August 2008 |
| (Denmark) Jan Kristiansen | SønderjyskE v Brøndby | 22 November 2008 |
| (Denmark) Martin Bernburg | Nordsjælland v Randers | 10 April 2009 |
| (Denmark) Bajram Fetai | Nordsjælland v Vejle | 18 May 2009 |

== Season statistics ==
=== Scoring ===
- First goal of the season: Bédi Buval for Randers against AGF (19 July 2008)
- Fastest goal in a match: Frank Kristensen (17 seconds) for Midtjylland against Brøndby (31 May 2009)
- Widest Winning Margin: SønderjyskE 0–6 Brøndby (22 November 2008)
- Most Goals in a Match: Brøndby 4–3 Horsens (3 November 2008) / Copenhagen 5–2 Horsens (7 December 2008) / Nordsjælland 6–1 Randers (10 April 2009) / OB 6–1 AGF (4 May 2009)
- First hat-trick of the season: Babajide Collins Babatunde for Midtjylland against OB (10 August 2008)

=== Cards ===
- First yellow card: Lee Nguyen for Randers against AGF (19 July 2008)
- First red card: Martin Pedersen for AaB against Midtjylland (20 July 2008)
- Fastest red card in a match: Michael Beauchamp (17 minutes) for AaB against OB (17 August 2008)

=== Attendances ===
Source: hvemvandt.dk (in Danish)

| Team | Average | Highest | Lowest |
|---|---|---|---|
| Copenhagen | 20,038 | 32,856 | 11,286 |
| Brøndby | 16,908 | 26,014 | 9,689 |
| AGF | 11,516 | 18,239 | 8,246 |
| OB | 10,218 | 15,486 | 6,662 |
| Midtjylland | 7,777 | 10,613 | 5,670 |
| Esbjerg | 7,229 | 12,081 | 4,049 |
| AaB | 7,168 | 9,470 | 5,415 |
| Vejle | 6,524 | 10,092 | 3,429 |
| Randers | 6,059 | 8,550 | 3,322 |
| Horsens | 4,685 | 8,217 | 2,604 |
| Nordsjælland | 4,020 | 8,443 | 2,019 |
| SønderjyskE | 3,420 | 6,988 | 1,609 |

== Player of the Month ==
| Month | Winner | Runners-ups |
|---|---|---|
| July/August | (Senegal) Baye Djiby Fall (OB) | (Denmark) Christopher Poulsen (Midtjylland) (Senegal) Tidiane Sane (Randers) |
| September | (Senegal) Baye Djiby Fall (OB) | (Brazil) César Santin (Copenhagen) (Denmark) Stephan Andersen (Brøndby) |
| October | (Denmark) Michael Krohn-Dehli (Brøndby) | (Senegal) Baye Djiby Fall (OB) (Brazil) César Santin (Copenhagen) |
| November | (Denmark) Michael Krohn-Dehli (Brøndby) | (Denmark) Morten Nordstrand (Copenhagen) (Denmark) Hans Henrik Andreasen (OB) |
| March | (Sweden) Andreas Johansson (AaB) | (Sweden) Fredrik Björck (Esbjerg) (Denmark) Jimmy Nielsen (Vejle) |
| April | (Nigeria) Peter Utaka (OB) | (Denmark) Jesper Grønkjær (Copenhagen) (Denmark) Marc Nygaard (Randers) |
| May | (Brazil) Aílton José Almeida (Copenhagen) | (Denmark) Søren Berg (Randers) (Denmark) Jakob Poulsen (AGF) |

== Kits ==
| Team | Kit maker | Shirt sponsor | Notes |
|---|---|---|---|
| AaB | hummel | Spar Nord | Same as 2007–08 |
| AC Horsens | hummel | TeliaSonera | Same as 2007–08 |
| AGF | hummel | Ceres / Faxe Kondi | New home and away kits |
| Brøndby IF | adidas | KasiGroup/UNICEF | KasiGroup replaced Codan as head sponsors, and gave the sponsorship place to UNICEF. New home kits. |
| Esbjerg fB | Umbro | Frøs Herreds Sparekasse | New away kit without black stripe along the sides |
| F.C. Copenhagen | Kappa | Carlsberg | New kits and printings |
| FC Midtjylland | Puma | SPAR | Same as 2007–08 |
| FC Nordsjælland | H_{2}O | Jyske Bank | Same as 2007–08 |
| OB | Puma | Carlsberg | Puma replaced Nike as kit makers |
| Randers FC | Umbro | none | Forenede Rengøring stopped being head sponsors. New kits. |
| SønderjyskE | hummel | Sydbank | New home kit |
| Vejle BK | hummel | Champions Club | Same as 2007–08 |

== See also ==
- 2008–09 Danish Cup
- 2008–09 Danish 1st Division
- 2008–09 in Danish football
