= List of FC Midtjylland players =

== List of notable players ==
Statistics are up to date as of 22 August 2012.

Please help to expand this list.

Note: the source for the Career dates and Total apps/goals for a number of the below players is unclear and the reference used should be added.

Name	Nationality	Position	FC Midtjylland career	Total apps	Total goals
Frank Kristensen	Denmark	FW	1999–2011, 2013-	331	136
Kristian Bak Nielsen	Denmark	DF	2000–2007, 2010-	225	16
Tim Sparv	Finland	MF	2014–2020	132	3
Ulrik Lindkvist	Denmark	DF	2000–2007	149	5
Claus Madsen	Denmark	MF	2000–2007	101	10
Razak Pimpong	Ghana	MF	2000–2006	125	22
Mikkel Thygesen	Denmark	MF	2004–2007, 2007–2011	193	34
Morten Skoubo	Denmark	FW	1999–2002	54	24
Mohamed Zidan	Egypt	FW	2003–2005	47	30
Jesper Juelsgård	Denmark	DF	2007–	120	1
Mads Albæk	Denmark	MF	2008-2012	112	6
Danny Olsen	Denmark	MF	2007–	164	36
Kolja Afriyie	Germany	DF	2006–2010, 2011-	161	5
Peter Skov-Jensen	Denmark	GK	1999–2005	166	0
Jonas Lössl	Denmark	GK	2008–	92	8
Jonas Borring	Denmark	MF	2008–2012	121	24
Jude Nworuh	Nigeria	FW	2008–2012	88	17
Kristijan Ipša	Croatia	DF	2008–2012	112	7
Rilwan Olanrewaju Hassan	Nigeria	MF	2010–	82	8
Izunna Uzochukwu	Nigeria	MF	2009–	105	3
Sylvester Igboun	Nigeria	FW	2010–	83	10
Adigun Salami	Nigeria	MF	2006–2012	106	2
Winston Reid	New Zealand	DF	2005–2010	86	2
Magnus Troest	Denmark	DF	2005–2008	75	6
Jakob Poulsen	Denmark	MF	2010–2012	54	9
Dennis Sørensen	Denmark	MF	2004–2007	102	25
Søren Skriver	Denmark	MF	1999–2006	165	?
Jesper Mikkelsen	Denmark	MF	2000–2007	227	22
Rasmus Daugaard	Denmark	DF	2003–2006	77	4
Leon Jessen	Denmark	DF	2005–2010	99	3
Simon Poulsen	Denmark	DF	2005–2007	63	5
