= 2005 Danish Cup final =

- Event: 2004–05 Danish Cup
| Brøndby | Midtjylland |
| 3 | 2 |
- After extra time
- Date: 5 May 2005
- Venue: Parken, Copenhagen
- Man of the Match: Johan Elmander (Brøndby)
- Referee: Knud Erik Fisker
- Attendance: 35,716

The 2005 Danish Cup final was the final and deciding match of the 2004–05 Danish Cup. It took place on Thursday 5 May 2005 at Parken Stadium in Copenhagen and saw the Superliga leaders Brøndby IF beat no. 3 in the league FC Midtjylland after extra time.

Brøndby have won the Cup on four previous occasions (1989, 1994, 1998 and 2003). Midtjylland have never won the Cup.

Referee Knud Erik Fisker officiated the match.

== Road to Copenhagen ==
| Brøndby | | | FC Midtjylland | |
|---|---|---|---|---|
| Esbjerg fB [SL] A 1–0 | Kamper 17 | Fifth round | Herfølge BK [SL] A 4–1 | Rathe 27; Sørensen 44; Madsen 78; Zidan 85 |
| BK Skjold [1D] A 2–0 | Skoubo 14; Nielsen 25 | Quarter finals | Ølstykke FC [1D] A 3–0 | Zidan 50, 63; Sørensen 70 |
| F.C. Copenhagen [SL] H 1–0 | Skoubo 78 | Semi finals First leg | AC Horsens [1D] A 4–0 | Bak Nielsen; Sørensen (2); Mikkelsen |
| F.C. Copenhagen [SL] A 2–2 | Skoubo 38; Kahlenberg 71 | Second leg | AC Horsens [1D] H 1–0 | Frandsen |

- Both teams started in fifth round.
- Square brackets [ ] represent the opposition's division.

== Match facts ==
5 May 2005
15:00 CEST

| Brøndby | 3–2 (a.e.t.) | FC Midtjylland |
|---|---|---|
| Skoubo 41'; Daugaard 76'; Bagger 111' | | Hansen 47'; Pimpong 60' |

Parken Stadium, Copenhagen
Attendance: 34,026
Referee: Knud Erik Fisker

BRØNDBY IF
| GK | 1 | (Denmark) Casper Ankergren |
| RB | 6 | (Denmark) Sebastian Svärd |
| CB | 4 | (Denmark) Per Nielsen (C) |
| CB | 2 | (Denmark) Daniel Agger |
| LB | 20 | (Denmark) Asbjørn Sennels | (substituted off) 70' |
| RM | 9 | (Denmark) Martin Retov |
| CM | 7 | (Denmark) Kim Daugaard |
| CM | 11 | (Denmark) Mads Jørgensen | (substituted off) 62' |
| LM | 7 | (Denmark) Thomas Kahlenberg |
| FW | 17 | (Denmark) Morten Skoubo | (substituted off) 91' |
| FW | 19 | (Sweden) Johan Elmander |
Substitutes:
| GK | 16 | (Morocco) Karim Zaza |
| DF | 5 | (Denmark) Dan Anton Johansen | (substituted on) 91' |
| MF | 12 | (Denmark) Jonas Kamper | (substituted on) 62' |
| FW | 15 | (Denmark) Ruben Bagger | (substituted on) 70' |
Manager:
(Denmark) Michael Laudrup

FC MIDTJYLLAND
| GK | 1 | (Denmark) Anders Rasmussen |
| RB | 12 | (Denmark) Jesper Mikkelsen | (yellow card) 119' |
| CB | 32 | (Denmark) Kristian Bak Nielsen (C) |
| CB | 9 | (Denmark) Rasmus Daugaard |
| LB | 31 | (Denmark) Ulrik Lindkvist |
| RM | 24 | (Denmark) Dennis Sørensen |
| CM | 10 | (Denmark) Michael Hansen | (substituted off) 79' |
| CM | 11 | (Ghana) Razak Pimpong | (yellow card) 33' (yellow-red card) 65' |
| LM | 5 | (Denmark) Thomas Frandsen | (yellow card) 45' (substituted off) 48' |
| FW | 8 | (Denmark) David Nielsen | (yellow card) 120' |
| FW | 23 | (Denmark) Frank Kristensen | (substituted off) 74' |
Substitutes:
| GK | 16 | (Sweden) Ola Tidman |
| MF | 4 | (Denmark) Thomas Rathe | (substituted on) 48' |
| MF | 7 | (Denmark) Claus Madsen | (substituted on) 74' |
| MF | 21 | (Denmark) Mikkel Thygesen | (substituted on) 79' |
Manager:
(Denmark) Erik Rasmussen

MATCH RULES

- 90 minutes.
- 2 x 15 minutes of extra-time if necessary.
- Penalty shootout if scores still level.
- Four named substitutes
- Maximum of 3 substitutions.

== See also ==
- 2004–05 Danish Cup for details of the current competition.
