= 2001–02 Sporting CP season =

Sporting CP
2001–02 season
- President: António Dias da Cunha
- Head coach: László Bölöni
- Stadium: Estádio José Alvalade
- Primeira Liga: 1st
- Taça de Portugal: Winners
- UEFA Cup: Third round
- Top goalscorer: League: Mário Jardel (42); All: Mário Jardel (48)

The 2001–02 season was Sporting Clube de Portugal's 96th season in existence and the club's 68th consecutive season in the top flight of Portuguese football. In addition to the domestic league, Sporting CP participated in this season's editions of the Taça de Portugal and UEFA Cup. The season covers the period from 1 July 2001 to 30 June 2002.

== Players ==
=== First-team squad ===
Note: Flags indicate national team as defined under FIFA eligibility rules; some limited exceptions apply. Players may hold more than one non-FIFA nationality.

No.	Pos.	Nation	Player
1	GK	POR	Nélson
2	MF	POR	Diogo
3	MF	POR	Dimas
4	MF	POR	Rui Bento
5	DF	IRL	Phil Babb
6	DF	POR	André Cruz
7	FW	ROU	Marius Niculae
8	MF	POR	Pedro Barbosa
9	FW	CRO	Robert Špehar
10	FW	POR	Sá Pinto
11	MF	CHI	Rodrigo Tello
12	GK	POR	Tiago
13	MF	CZE	Pavel Horváth
15	MF	POR	Hugo
16	FW	BRA	Mário Jardel
17	MF	POR	Paulo Bento
18	DF	POR	Luís Filipe

No.	Pos.	Nation	Player
19	MF	ANG	Lourenço
20	MF	POR	Ricardo Quaresma
21	FW	GRE	Dimitris Nalitzis
22	DF	POR	Beto
23	DF	POR	Rui Jorge
24	GK	POR	Beto
25	MF	POR	João Pinto
26	DF	ARG	Facundo Quiroga
27	MF	POR	Custódio
29	DF	BRA	César Prates
31	GK	POR	Alemão
32	DF	ANG	Jorge Vidigal
35	DF	ARG	Santamaria
45	MF	POR	Hugo Viana
47	MF	POR	Afonso Martins
51	MF	POR	Gisvi
52	DF	MOZ	Paíto

== Competitions ==
=== Overall record ===
Competition	First match	Last match	Starting round	Final position	Record							
Competition	First match	Last match	Starting round	Final position	Pld	W	D	L	GF	GA	GD	Win %
Primeira Liga	12 August 2001	5 May 2002	Matchday 1	Winners	34	22	9	3	74	25	+49	64.71
Taça de Portugal	12 December 2001	12 May 2002	Fifth round	Winners	7	6	1	0	17	5	+12	85.71
UEFA Cup	20 September 2001	6 December 2001	First round	Third round	6	4	1	1	14	6	+8	66.67
Total					47	32	11	4	105	36	+69	68.09

Source: Competitions

=== Primeira Liga ===
==== League table ====
Pos	Team	Pld	W	D	L	GF	GA	GD	Pts	Qualification or relegation
1	Sporting CP (C)	34	22	9	3	74	25	+49	75	Qualification to Champions League third qualifying round
2	Boavista	34	21	7	6	53	20	+33	70	Qualification to Champions League second qualifying round
3	Porto	34	21	5	8	66	34	+32	68	Qualification to UEFA Cup first round
4	Benfica	34	17	12	5	66	37	+29	63	Qualification to UEFA Cup first round
5	Belenenses	34	17	6	11	54	44	+10	57	Qualification to Intertoto Cup second round

Source: Primeira Divisão
Rules for classification: 1) points; 2) head-to-head points; 3) head-to-head goal difference; 4) goal difference; 5) number of goals scored
(C) Champions

==== Results summary ====
Overall								Home						Away					
Pld	W	D	L	GF	GA	GD	Pts	W	D	L	GF	GA	GD	W	D	L	GF	GA	GD
34	22	9	3	74	25	+49	75	13	3	1	37	7	+30	9	6	2	37	18	+19

==== Results by round ====
Round	1	2	3	4	5	6	7	8	9	10	11	12	13	14	15	16	17	18	19	20	21	22	23	24	25	26	27	28	29	30	31	32	33	34
Ground	H	A	H	A	H	A	H	A	H	A	A	H	A	H	A	H	A	A	H	A	H	A	H	A	H	A	H	H	A	H	A	H	A	H
Result	W	L	L	D	W	W	W	L	D	W	W	W	W	W	D	W	W	D	W	W	W	D	W	W	D	W	W	W	D	W	W	D	D	W
Position	7	12	16	15	9	4	2	4	6	4	4	4	3	1	1	1	1	1	1	1	1	2	1	1	1	1	1	1	1	1	1	1	1	1

Source: FootballPortugal
A = Away; H = Home; W = Win; D = Draw; L = Loss

==== Matches ====
12 August 2001 1	Sporting CP	1–0	Porto	Lisbon
				Stadium: Estádio José Alvalade

18 August 2001 2	Belenenses	3–0	Sporting CP

25 August 2001 3	Sporting CP	0–1	Alverca	Lisbon
				Stadium: Estádio José Alvalade

8 September 2001 4	União de Leiria	1–1	Sporting CP

14 September 2001 5	Sporting CP	3–1	Gil Vicente	Lisbon
				Stadium: Estádio José Alvalade

23 September 2001 6	Farense	1–3	Sporting CP

1 October 2001 7	Sporting CP	5–0	Vitória de Guimarães	Lisbon
				Stadium: Estádio José Alvalade

13 October 2001 8	Braga	2–1	Sporting CP

22 October 2001 9	Sporting CP	0–0	Santa Clara	Lisbon
				Stadium: Estádio José Alvalade

27 October 2001 10	Paços de Ferreira	0–6	Sporting CP

6 November 2001 11	Salgueiros	1–5	Sporting CP

26 November 2001 12	Sporting CP	2–0	Boavista	Lisbon
				Stadium: Estádio José Alvalade

1 December 2001 13	Marítimo	0–2	Sporting CP

9 December 2001 14	Sporting CP	4–0	Varzim	Lisbon
				Stadium: Estádio José Alvalade

15 December 2001 15	Benfica	2–2	Sporting CP	Lisbon

22 December 2001 16	Sporting CP	1–0	Vitória de Setúbal	Lisbon
				Stadium: Estádio José Alvalade

5 January 2002 17	Beira-Mar	1–2	Sporting CP

12 January 2002 18	Porto	2–2	Sporting CP

20 January 2002 19	Sporting CP	2–0	Belenenses	Lisbon
				Stadium: Estádio José Alvalade

26 January 2002 20	Alverca	1–3	Sporting CP

2 February 2002 21	Sporting CP	4–1	União de Leiria	Lisbon
				Stadium: Estádio José Alvalade

10 February 2002 22	Gil Vicente	1–1	Sporting CP

17 February 2002 23	Sporting CP	1–0	Farense	Lisbon
				Stadium: Estádio José Alvalade

22 February 2002 24	Vitória de Guimarães	0–1	Sporting CP

2 March 2002 25	Sporting CP	2–2	Braga	Lisbon
				Stadium: Estádio José Alvalade

10 March 2002 26	Santa Clara	0–3	Sporting CP

16 March 2002 27	Sporting CP	3–0	Paços de Ferreira	Lisbon
				Stadium: Estádio José Alvalade

23 March 2002 28	Sporting CP	2–0	Salgueiros	Lisbon
				Stadium: Estádio José Alvalade

30 March 2002 29	Boavista	0–0	Sporting CP

7 April 2002 30	Sporting CP	4–0	Marítimo	Lisbon
				Stadium: Estádio José Alvalade

13 April 2002 31	Varzim	1–3	Sporting CP

21 April 2002 32	Sporting CP	1–1	Benfica	Lisbon
				Stadium: Estádio José Alvalade

27 April 2002 33	Vitória de Setúbal	2–2	Sporting CP

5 May 2002 34	Sporting CP	2–1	Beira-Mar	Lisbon
				Stadium: Estádio José Alvalade

=== Taça de Portugal ===
17 November 2001 Fourth Rd	Sporting CP	3–1	Vilanovense	Lisbon
	Jardel 45' (pen.), 83', 89'		Nuno Rocha 33' (pen.)	Stadium: Estádio José Alvalade; Referee: Emanuel Câmara

12 December 2001 Fifth Rd	Sporting CP	4–1	Farense	Lisbon
	Quaresma 53'; Jardel 75' (pen.), 87'; Cruz 80'		Mestre 49'	Stadium: Estádio José Alvalade; Referee: Paulo Paraty

28 December 2001 Sixth Rd	Alverca	0–0 (a.e.t.)	Sporting CP	Alverca do Ribatejo
				Stadium: Complexo Desportivo FC Alverca; Referee: António Costa

9 January 2002 6R Replay	Sporting CP	2–1	Alverca	Lisbon
	João Pinto 76'; Jardel 86' (pen.)		Zeferino 11'	Stadium: Estádio José Alvalade; Referee: Paulo Costa

16 January 2002 Quarter-finals	Vila Real	0–4	Sporting CP	Vila Real
			Luís Filipe 22', 55'; André Cruz 35'; Quaresma 74'	Stadium: Complexo Desportivo Monte Da Forca; Referee: António Costa

6 February 2002 Semi-finals	Sporting CP	3–2 (a.e.t.)	Marítimo	Lisbon
21:00	Nalitzis 65'; André Cruz 85'; João Pinto 92'		Sabry 30'; Gaúcho 81'	Stadium: Estádio José Alvalade; Referee: Paulo Costa

12 May 2002 Final	Sporting CP	1–0	Leixões	Oeiras
17:00	Jardel 40'			Stadium: Estádio Nacional; Attendance: 37,500; Referee: Olegário Benquerença

=== UEFA Cup ===
==== First round ====
20 September 2001 First leg	Midtjylland (Denmark)	0–3	(Portugal) Sporting CP	Ikast, Denmark
		Report	Babb 50'; Beto 63'; Jardel 90'	Stadium: Ikast Stadion; Attendance: 5,150; Referee: Mircea Salomir (Romania)

27 September 2001 Second leg	Sporting CP (Portugal)	3–2 (6–2 agg.)	(Denmark) Midtjylland	Lisbon, Portugal
	Jardel 4', 45'; Skriver 85' (o.g.)	Report	Lindkvist 54'; Skoubo 56'	Stadium: Estádio José Alvalade; Attendance: 16,000; Referee: Miroslav Radoman (FR Yugoslavia)

==== Second round ====
18 October 2001 First leg	Halmstad (Sweden)	0–1	(Portugal) Sporting CP	Halmstad, Sweden
20:00		Report	Niculae 53'	Stadium: Örjans vall Attendance: 3,141; Referee: Pascal Garibian (France)

1 November 2001 Second leg	Sporting CP (Portugal)	6–1 (7–1 agg.)	(Sweden) Halmstad	Lisbon, Portugal
21:00	Jardel 30' (pen.), 76', 90'; João Pinto 39'; Niculae 61'; Paulo Bento 71'	Report	Nordstrand 41'	Stadium: Estádio José Alvalade; Attendance: 17,800; Referee: Philippe Leuba (Switzerland)

==== Third round ====
22 November 2001 First leg	Milan (Italy)	2–0	(Portugal) Sporting CP	Milan, Italy
20:45	Shevchenko 37'; Inzaghi 77'	Report		Stadium: San Siro; Attendance: 10,132; Referee: Juan Fernández Marin (Spain)

6 December 2001 Second leg	Sporting CP (Portugal)	1–1 (1–3 agg.)	(Italy) Milan	Lisbon, Portugal
21:00	Niculae 49'	Report	Moreno 90'	Stadium: Estádio José Alvalade; Attendance: 38,000; Referee: Ryszard Wójcik (Poland)
