= Mathias Hansen =

Mathias Hansen may refer to:

- Mathias Hansen House, a former Renaissance-style townhouse located in central Copenhagen, Denmark
- Mathias Bau Hansen (born 1993) is a Danish ice hockey player
- Mathias Lykke Hansen (born 1984), Danish professional football player
- Mathias Lee Hansen (born 1987), Danish gymnast
