= René Christensen =

René Christensen may refer to:

- René Christensen (footballer) (born 1988), Danish footballer
- René Christensen (politician) (born 1970), Danish politician and MF
