= Nick Ragus =

Nick Ragus may refer to:

- Nick Ragus (coach) (1908–1981), American football and basketball coach
- Nick Ragus (footballer) (born 1987), Danish professional football midfielder
