= Nuno Rocha =

Nuno Rocha may refer to two footballers.

- Nuno Miguel Teixeira Rocha, Portuguese footballer
- Nuno Miguel Monteiro Rocha, Cape Verdean footballer
