= Michael Stryger =

Danish footballer (born 1983)

Personal information
- Date of birth: 15 May 1983 (age 43)
- Place of birth: Denmark
- Height: 1.75 m (5 ft 9 in)
- Positions: Midfielder; right back

Team information
- Current team: Nykøbing FC

Senior career*
Years	Team	Apps	(Gls)
2001–2007	LFA	77	(1)
2007–2011	SønderjyskE	70	(1)
2011–2012	Vejle-Kolding	14	(0)
2012–2014	FC Roskilde	0	(0)
2015–	Nykøbing FC		
- * Club domestic league appearances and goals as of 9 March 2015

Michael Stryger (born 15 May 1983) is a Danish professional football midfielder, who currently plays for the Danish 2nd Division club Nykøbing FC.
