= Muhammed Akinci =

Danish footballer (born 1983)

Personal information
- Date of birth: 20 April 1983 (age 43)
- Place of birth: Turkey
- Position: Midfielder

Senior career*
Years	Team	Apps	(Gls)
2001–2007	Silkeborg IF	75	(5)
2007–2008	Konyaspor	2	(0)
2008–2009	Konya Şekerspor		
2009–2011	Blokhus		
- * Club domestic league appearances and goals

Muhammed Akinci (born 20 April 1983) is a Danish retired footballer.

== Career ==
Debuting for Silkeborg IF against Aarhus Gymnastikforening, in 2004/05 Akinci started 26 league games for the club and was considered one of the top prospects in the Danish top flight at the time. In 2007, he signed for Konyaspor in Turkey, saying that "there is a huge difference from the time in Silkeborg. It is not at all the same as in Denmark. I can easily feel that I have come to a bigger club with the spectators and the expectations that are for us." However, Akinci sustained an in Turkey which kept him out of the game before joining Danish third division outfit Jammerbugt.
