= Mathias Bersang Sørensen =

Danish footballer (born 1991)

Personal information
- Full name: Mathias Bersang Sørensen
- Date of birth: 24 November 1991 (age 34)
- Place of birth: Randers, Denmark
- Height: 1.80 m (5 ft 11 in)
- Position: Midfielder

Youth career
- –2010: Randers

Senior career*
Years	Team	Apps	(Gls)
2010–2012	Randers	0	(0)
2012–2016	Hobro	64	(6)
2016–2020	Skive	70	(7)
Total		134	(13)
- * Club domestic league appearances and goals

Mathias Bersang Sørensen (born 24 November 1991) is a Danish former professional footballer who played as a midfielder.

== Career ==
=== Randers ===
After several seasons in Randers FC's academy, Bersang Sørensen first came to prominence with two substitutions in the Europa League. He made his debut on 1 July 2010 in a 6–1 win over F91 Dudelange, coming on in the 85th minute for Ricki Olsen. He was mostly used as a reserve during his time in Randers.

=== Hobro ===
On 22 December 2011, it was announced that Bersang Sørensen had signed a two-and-a-half-year contract with Danish 1st Division club Hobro IK. Due to some great performances for the team, he signed a contract extension in October 2013 until 2016.

=== Skive ===
Bersang Sørensen transferred to Skive IK in the summer 2016, as his contract with Hobro had expired. He left the club in 2020, after suffering a concussion which ruled him out indefinitely.
