= Emmanuel Ukpai =

Nigerian footballer

Personal information
- Full name: Emmanuel Ukpai
- Date of birth: October 11, 1987 (age 39)
- Place of birth: Yenagoa, Nigeria
- Height: 1.85 m (6 ft 1 in)
- Position: Striker

Youth career
- 2001–2005: Douanes Lomé

Senior career*
Years	Team	Apps	(Gls)
2006	Frem	6	(1)
2006–2007	Ølstykke	40	(22)
2008–2010	Esbjerg	36	(2)
2011	HB Køge	0	(0)
2011	FC Fyn	1	(1)
2012	B68 Toftir	5	(0)
- * Club domestic league appearances and goals

Emmanuel Ukpai (born 11 October 1987) is a former Nigerian football striker.

== Career ==
He began his career in Togo by Douane FC joined in January 2006 to Boldklubben Frem and played his first game on 14 May 2006 against Lolland-Falster Alliancen. He left after 6 months Copenhagen and moved to Ølstykke FC by the club played 46 matches making 22 goals. Than transferred to Esbjerg fB he left also Ølstykke FC from the second Danish tier in January 2008.
