= Ronni Bagge =

Danish footballer

Ronni Moesgaard Bagge
Personal information
- Date of birth: October 5, 1984 (age 42)
- Place of birth: Grædstrup, Denmark
- Height: 1.80 m (5 ft 11 in)
- Position: Midfielder

Youth career
- 1989–1997: Brædstrup IF
- 1998–2002: Silkeborg IF
- 2002–2003: Vejle Boldklub

Senior career*
Years	Team	Apps	(Gls)
2003–2006	Vejle Boldklub	50	(2)
2006–?	Thisted FC (On loan)		
- * Club domestic league appearances and goals as of January 27, 2007

Ronni Moesgaard Bagge (born October 5, 1984, in Grædstrup) is a Danish former professional football player who played for Danish Superliga club Vejle Boldklub.

He's currently the owner of an real estate agency.
