= René Petersen =

Danish footballer

Personal information
- Place of birth: Denmark
- Position: Midfielder

Senior career*
Years	Team	Apps	(Gls)
1996–1999	Sint-Truidense V.V.	45	(2)
1999–2000	Kidderminster Harriers F.C.	18	(3)
2000–20xx	Hvidovre IF		
- * Club domestic league appearances and goals

René Petersen is a Danish retired footballer.

== Career ==
Petersen started his senior career in Denmark. In 1996, he signed for Sint-Truidense V.V. in the Belgian Pro League, where he made over forty appearances and scored two league goals. After that, he played for English club Kidderminster Harriers and Danish club Hvidovre IF before retiring.
