= Casper Jacobsen =

Danish footballer (born 1979)

Personal information
- Full name: Casper Dalsgaard Jacobsen
- Date of birth: 12 July 1979 (age 47)
- Place of birth: Viborg, Denmark
- Height: 1.90 m (6 ft 3 in)
- Position: Goalkeeper

Youth career
- 1998–1999: Viborg FF

Senior career*
| Years | Team | Apps | (Gls) |
| 1999–2002 | Viborg FF | - | (-) |
| 2002–2003 | Aarhus GF | - | (-) |
| 2004–2005 | Viborg FF | - | (-) |
| 2005–2007 | Aalborg BK | 7 | (0) |
| 2007–2009 | Breiðablik UBK | 24 | (0) |
| 2009 | Viborg Søndermarken IK | | |
| 2009–2010 | Vejle Boldklub | 0 | (0) |

International career
| 2000 | Denmark U21 | 1 | (0) |
- * Club domestic league appearances and goals

Casper Dalsgaard Jacobsen (born 12 July 1979) is a Danish former footballer, who last played as a semi-professional goalkeeper for Vejle Boldklub in the Danish 1st Division.
