= Bora Živković =

Danish footballer (born 1974)

Personal information
- Date of birth: 4 September 1974 (age 52)
- Place of birth: Aarhus, Denmark
- Height: 1.87 m (6 ft 2 in)
- Position: Centre-back

Senior career*
Years	Team	Apps	(Gls)
1994–2002	Silkeborg	189	(14)
2002–2004	Copenhagen	48	(5)
2004	Herfølge	12	(1)
2004–2006	Fredrikstad	45	(2)
2006–2009	Vejle	89	(5)
2009–2011	Hjørring		

Managerial career
- 2011–2012: Hjørring (assistant)
- 2014–2016: Sydvest 05
- * Club domestic league appearances and goals

Bora Živković (born 4 September 1974) is a Danish former professional football coach and former player. A centre-back, he played 310 games in the Danish Superliga, representing Silkeborg IF for the majority of the games. He has won the 1994 Danish championships and 2001 Danish Cup with Silkeborg, as well as two Danish championships and the 2004 Danish Cup with F.C. Copenhagen.

== Playing style ==
Even though he was a defender, Živković had a certain skill to score goals often by heading. This has resulted in him scoring in all the clubs he has ever played for and in his debut for both Herfølge Boldklub on 14 March 2004 and for Vejle Boldklub on 19 July 2006. He came close to do the same in his debut for Fredrikstad FK on 25 July 2004 but missed a penalty.

== Club career ==
Zivkovic got his breakthrough with Danish Superliga club Silkeborg IF, making his league debut in August 1993. The one game was his only contribution, as Silkeborg won the 1993–94 Danish Superliga championship. He established himself in the starting line-up in April 1995, and was a mainstay in the team from then on. He was a part of the Silkeborg team which won the 2001 Danish Cup final 4–1 against AB. He suffered a knee injury in the Cup final, and Silkeborg hesitated in extending his contract. With six months left of his Silkeborg contract, Zivkovic signed a pre-contract with defending Superliga champions F.C. Copenhagen in August 2001. He played a total 189 games and scored 14 goals for Silkeborg in the Superliga.

He joined F.C. Copenhagen in the winter break of the 2001–02 Danish Superliga, where he found himself in contention with later Danish international defenders Martin Albrechtsen and Bo Svensson for the starting positions. He played 48 games and scored five goals in the Superliga during two years with F.C. Copenhagen, and won the 2003 Superliga, as well as the Double in 2004 of both Superliga and Danish Cup trophies. He never secured a long-term place in the F.C. Copenhagen starting line-up, and was loaned out to Superliga relegation battlers Herfølge BK in February 2004, helping Herfølge finish in 10th place.

In July 2004, he left F.C. Copenhagen permanently to play for Norwegian Premier League team Fredrikstad FK. He played two years in Fredrikstad as the leader of the defense, and was team captain in his last six months at the club. When Zivkovic disliked the tactics of new Fredrikstad coach Egil Olsen, he looked to leave the club. He moved back to Denmark in June 2006, to play for newly promoted Superliga team Vejle Boldklub. He was named team captain, but could not prevent Vejle from being relegated to the Danish 1st Division at the end of the 2006–07 Danish Superliga season. He stayed with the club and helped Vejle bounce back to the Superliga the following year. Vejle were also relegated after the 2008–09 Danish Superliga season, and Zivkovic left the club as his contract expired.

He initially ended his career, but eventually chose to continue his career with Danish 2nd Division club FC Hjørring in August 2009. He ended his career in June 2011.

== International career ==
Born of Serbian ancestry, Zivkovic got a Danish citizenship in 1996. In his last year with Silkeborg, he was called up for the Denmark national football team in May 2001. He was not a part of the match day squad, and was not called up again.

== Managerial career ==
On 15 July 2011, Zivkovic was appointed assistant manager of the new FC Hjørring-manager Boye Habekost.

== Honours ==
Silkeborg

- Danish Superliga: 1993–94
- UEFA Intertoto Cup: 1996
- Danish Cup: 2001

Copenhagen

- Danish Superliga: 2002–03, 2003–04
- Danish Cup: 2004
