= Ole Budtz =

Danish footballer (born 1979)

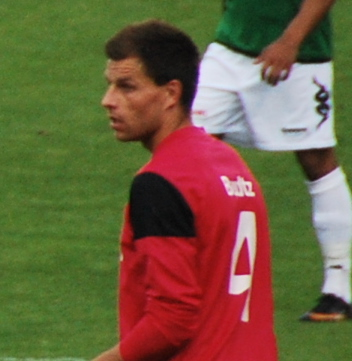
- Budtz in 2011

Personal information
- Date of birth: 20 April 1979 (age 47)
- Place of birth: Hillerød, Denmark
- Height: 1.96 m (6 ft 5 in)
- Positions: Central defender; striker

Youth career
- Skovshoved IF

Senior career*
Years	Team	Apps	(Gls)
–2002	RB 1906		
2002–2004	Cercle Brugge	33	(13)
2004–2006	Kickers Offenbach	38	(2)
2006–2009	AGF	67	(5)
2009	Notodden	8	(2)
2010	Brabrand	14	(0)
2010–2011	FC Fyn	18	(3)
2011–2013	Roskilde		
2013–2014	Lejre		

Managerial career
- 2008–2009: AGF reserves
- * Club domestic league appearances and goals

Ole Budtz (born 20 April 1979, in Hillerød) is a Danish former professional footballer who played as a central defender. He played for Belgian club Cercle Brugge and for German side Kickers Offenbach. He has also played for Roskilde, AGF and Brabrand IF. He later moved to the Danish 1st Division with FC Roskilde from FC Fyn.

== Career ==
Budtz started his career as a forward. He was the top goal scorer for Cercle in the 2002–03 season, scoring 13 goals in 30 competition matches. He was converted to a defender while playing with Offenbach Kickers.

== Personal life ==
His twin brother, Jan Budtz, is a goalkeeper.
