= Willads Delvin =

Danish footballer

Personal information
- Full name: Willads Blaxkjær Delvin
- Date of birth: 2 May 2001 (age 25)
- Height: 1.72 m (5 ft 8 in)
- Position: Left winger

Team information
- Current team: Nykøbing FC
- Number: 12

Youth career
- –2018: Holbæk B&I
- 2018–2021: Lyngby

Senior career*
Years	Team	Apps	(Gls)
2020–2021	Lyngby	3	(0)
2021–	Nykøbing FC	32	(2)
- * Club domestic league appearances and goals as of 17 November 2023

Willads Blaxkjær Delvin (born 2 May 2001) is a Danish professional footballer who plays for Nykøbing FC.

== Club career ==
He made his Danish Superliga debut for Lyngby on 23 October 2020 in a game against OB. He suffered relegation to the Danish 1st Division with the club on 9 May 2021 after a loss to last placed AC Horsens.
