= Gisvi =

Portuguese footballer

Personal information
- Full name: Gisvi Isaque Andrade Antunes
- Date of birth: 6 March 1982 (age 44)
- Place of birth: Windhoek, South-West Africa
- Height: 1.87 m (6 ft 2 in)
- Position: Forward

Youth career
- 1994–1996: União Santarém
- 1997–1999: Alcanenense
- 1999–2001: Sporting CP

Senior career*
| Years | Team | Apps | (Gls) |
| 2001–2004 | Sporting B | 79 | (14) |
| 2004 | Lousada | 18 | (5) |
| 2005 | Fátima | 18 | (5) |
| 2005 | Ovarense | 8 | (4) |
| 2006 | Ethnikos Asteras | 1 | (0) |
| 2006–2007 | Lixa | 25 | (6) |
| 2007–2009 | Zamora B | 10 | (5) |
| 2009–2012 | Olímpico Montijo | 22 | (8) |
| 2012–2013 | Luso Morense | | |
| 2017–2018 | Alcochetense | | |
| Total | | 181 | (47) |

International career
| 2000 | Portugal U17 | 4 | (1) |
| 2002 | Portugal U20 | 5 | (0) |
- * Club domestic league appearances and goals

Gisvi Isaque Andrade Antunes (born 6 March 1982 in Windhoek, South-West Africa), known simply as Gisvi, is a Portuguese former footballer who played as a forward.

== Honours ==
Sporting

- Taça de Portugal: 2001–02
