= Jesper Kjærulff =

Danish footballer (born 1983)

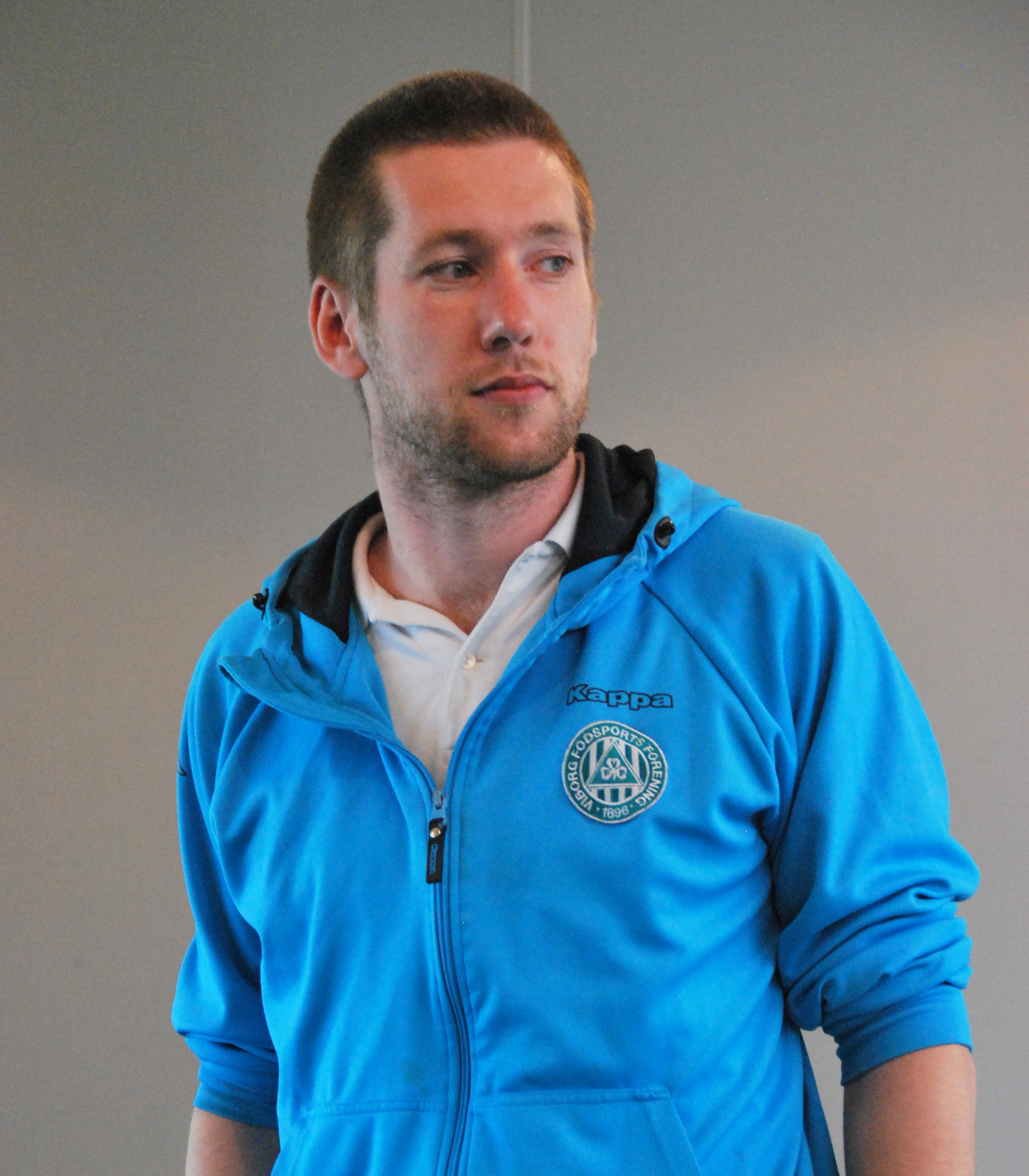
- Kjærulff in 2011

Personal information
- Full name: Jesper Lyngsø Kjærulff
- Date of birth: 7 October 1983 (age 43)
- Place of birth: Denmark
- Height: 1.86 m (6 ft 1 in)
- Position: Forward

Senior career*
| Years | Team | Apps | (Gls) |
| 2002–2005 | Holbæk B&I | | |
| 2005–2006 | Dalum | | |
| 2006–2007 | Fyn | 28 | (20) |
| 2007–2010 | SønderjyskE | 92 | (18) |
| 2010–2012 | Viborg | 56 | (11) |
| 2012–2013 | Fyn | 17 | (3) |
| 2013–2018 | Broby | | |
| 2018–2019 | BBB | | |
| 2019–2021 | Fjordager | 20 | (22) |
- * Club domestic league appearances and goals

Jesper Lyngsø Kjærulff (born 7 October 1983) is a Danish former professional footballer who played as a forward.

== Career ==
=== Professional ===
In his early career, Kjærulff played for lower division clubs Holbæk B&I, Dalum and FC Fyn. In the summer of 2007, Kjærulff entered into a two-year agreement with SønderjyskE in the second-tier Danish 1st Division. Before moving to SønderjyskE, he was the top goalscorer for Fyn in the 2nd Division West, where in the 2006–07 season he scored 19 goals in 31 appearances. In the first two seasons with SønderjyskE, Kjærulff marked himself as a key player at the club and was a regular in the first team, which in the summer of 2009 was rewarded with a contract extension for another two seasons. After that, his playing time diminished.

In August 2010, Kjærulff was signed by Danish 1st Division club Viborg on a two-year contract. There, he played until the expiration of his contract in the summer of 2012, when the club chose not to extend his contract.

After leaving Viborg, Kjærulff moved to newly promoted 1st Division club FC Fyn in July 2012, where he signed a one-year contract, reuniting him with his former club. His contract with the Funen-based club meant that Kjærulff went from being a full-time professional to being part-time, as he worked as a physiotherapist besides playing football.

=== Lower tiers ===
He was released along with the rest of FC Fyn's squad when the club suspended its activities on 31 January 2013 due to financial problems. Afterwards, he played on lower level with FC Broby, BBB and Fjordager IF. Kjærulff won the award of best striker in the fall of 2020 in the Funen Series.

Kjærulff retired from football in February 2021 at age 37, instead pursuing a career in coaching. At that point, he worked as assistant manager for Dalum.
