= Davit Devdariani =

Georgian footballer (born 1987)

David Devdariani
Personal information
- Full name: David Devdariani
- Date of birth: 28 October 1987 (age 39)
- Place of birth: Georgia
- Height: 1.88 m (6 ft 2 in)
- Position: Midfielder

Youth career
- 1994–1999: Dinamo Tbilisi
- 1999–2004: FC Tbilisi

Senior career*
| Years | Team | Apps | (Gls) |
| 2004–2005 | FC Tbilisi | 2 | (0) |
| 2005–2006 | FC Tbilisi 2 | 28 | (4) |
| 2006–2007 | USL Dunkerque | 0 | (0) |
| 2007–2008 | Olimpi Rustavi | 20 | (4) |
| 2008–2015 | AGF | 105 | (18) |

International career
| 2008 | Georgia U-21 | 2 | (0) |
| 2008–2012 | Georgia | 7 | (0) |
- * Club domestic league appearances and goals

David Devdariani (Georgian: დავით დევდარიანი; born 28 October 1987) is a Georgian footballer who currently is unemployed. He played for the Georgian national team.

He began his career as a professional football player in 2004 at FC Tbilisi in Georgia and later signed a contract with Danish Superliga side AGF Aarhus in August 2008.
