= Thomas Seidelin =

Danish footballer

Personal information
- Full name: Thomas Tobias Seidelin
- Date of birth: April 1, 1987 (age 39)
- Place of birth: Denmark
- Height: 1.87 m (6 ft 2 in)
- Position: Goalkeeper

Team information
- Current team: BSV
- Number: 1

Youth career
- 1998–2002: AB
- 2002–2008: Lyngby BK

Senior career*
Years	Team	Apps	(Gls)
2007–2008	Lyngby Ungdom	23	(0)
2008	Lyngby BK	4	(0)
2008–2009	BK Frem	17	(0)
2009	AB	0	(0)
2010–present	BSV		

International career
2002	Denmark U-16	3	(0)
2006	Denmark U-20	1	(0)
- * Club domestic league appearances and goals

Thomas Tobias Seidelin (born 1 April 1987 ) is a Danish professional footballer, who currently plays for Danish 2nd Division East side BK Søllerød-Vedbæk.
