= Mathias Lykke Hansen =

Danish footballer (born 1984)

Personal information
- Date of birth: 22 June 1984 (age 42)
- Place of birth: Denmark
- Height: 1.78 m (5 ft 10 in)
- Position: Midfielder

Youth career
- –1997: Løsning IF
- 1997–2003: Vejle Boldklub

Senior career*
Years	Team	Apps	(Gls)
2003–2008	Vejle Boldklub	39	(2)

International career^{‡}
2000	Denmark U-16	2	(0)
2001	Denmark U-17	1	(0)
2002	Denmark U-18	1	(0)
2001–02	Denmark U-19	3	(1)
2003	Denmark U-19	4	(0)
- * Club domestic league appearances and goals as of 7 April 2008 ‡ National team caps and goals as of 7 April 2008

Mathias Lykke Hansen (born 22 June 1984) is a Danish former professional football player.
