= Thomas Frandsen =

Danish footballer (born 1976)

Personal information
- Date of birth: March 25, 1976 (age 50)
- Place of birth: Kalundborg, Denmark
- Position: Midfielder

Senior career*
Years	Team	Apps	(Gls)
1995–1996	Viborg FF	11	(0)
1996–1997	OB	3	(0)
1997–2003	Viborg FF	141	(26)
2003–2005	FC Midtjylland	55	(7)
2005–2008	Viborg FF	82	(10)
2008–2009	Skive IK		

International career
1995–1996	Denmark U21	4	(0)
2002	Denmark	1	(0)

Managerial career
- 2008–2009: Skive IK (player assistant)
- 2015-2016: Holstebro Boldklub
- * Club domestic league appearances and goals

Thomas Frandsen (born March 25, 1976) is a Danish former professional association football player, who played as a midfielder. He has played one game for the Denmark national football team.

== Career ==
Frandsen was not selected for the Denmark squad for the 2002 World Cup, despite being seriously considered.

== Honours ==
Viborg FF

- Danish Cup
  - 1999–2000
- Danish Super Cup
  - 2000
