= Nick Ragus (footballer) =

Danish footballer (born 1987)

Personal information
- Date of birth: 19 February 1987 (age 39)
- Place of birth: Denmark
- Height: 1.80 m (5 ft 11 in)
- Position: Midfielder

Team information
- Current team: Næsby BK

Youth career
- B 1913
- FC Midtjylland

Senior career*
Years	Team	Apps	(Gls)
2006–2008	FC Midtjylland	0	(0)
2008–2009	Viborg FF	-	(-)
2009–2010	Brabrand IF		
2010–2013	Næsby BK		
2014–	Næsby BK		

International career^{‡}
2004	Denmark U-18	2	(0)
- * Club domestic league appearances and goals as of 1 July 2007 ‡ National team caps and goals as of 9 September 2004

Nick Ragus (born 19 February 1987) is a Danish professional football midfielder, who currently plays for the Danish club Næsby BK.
