= Søren Skriver =

Danish footballer

Soren Skriver
Personal information
- Date of birth: 10 June 1973 (age 53)
- Place of birth: Denmark
- Positions: Defender; midfielder; striker

Senior career*
Years	Team	Apps	(Gls)
- Sdr. Omme IF
1994-2004	FC Midtjylland	131+	(13+)
- * Club domestic league appearances and goals

Søren Skriver (born 10 June 1973 in Denmark) is a Danish retired footballer.
