= René Christensen (footballer) =

Danish footballer (born 1988)

Personal information
- Full name: René Sjøgren Christensen
- Date of birth: 21 January 1988 (age 38)
- Place of birth: Denmark
- Height: 1.80 m (5 ft 11 in)
- Position: Defender

Senior career*
Years	Team	Apps	(Gls)
2006–2008	AC Horsens		
- * Club domestic league appearances and goals

René Sjøgren Christensen (born 21 January 1988) is a Danish former professional football midfielder.

He played two years in the Danish Superliga side AC Horsens, before giving up a professional career and start working and take an education.
