= Nuno Rocha (Portuguese footballer) =

Portuguese footballer

Personal information
- Full name: Nuno Miguel Teixeira da Rocha
- Date of birth: 1 March 1977 (age 49)
- Place of birth: Porto, Portugal
- Height: 1.86 m (6 ft 1 in)
- Position: Attacking midfielder

Youth career
- 1987–1994: Ermesinde
- 1994–1996: Porto

Senior career*
Years	Team	Apps	(Gls)
1996–1997	Trofense		
1997	Paços Ferreira	7	(0)
1998	Leça	4	(0)
1998–1999	Académica	3	(0)
1999–2000	Trofense	30	(5)
2000–2002	Vilanovense	58	(16)
2002–2003	Braga B	17	(3)
2002–2004	Braga	23	(2)
2004	Santa Clara	10	(0)
2004–2005	Chaves	25	(1)
2005–2006	Gondomar	11	(0)
2006–2009	Varzim	40	(5)
2009–2010	Aliados Lordelo	6	(0)
Total		234	(32)
- * Club domestic league appearances and goals

Nuno Miguel Teixeira da Rocha (born 1 March 1977) is a Portuguese retired footballer who played as an attacking midfielder.

== Club career ==
Rocha was born in Porto. During his career, spent mainly in the lower leagues, he represented C.D. Trofense (two spells, the first of those in the fourth division), F.C. Paços de Ferreira, Leça FC, Académica de Coimbra, Vilanovense FC, S.C. Braga, C.D. Santa Clara, G.D. Chaves, Gondomar SC, Varzim S.C. and Aliados Lordelo FC.

With Braga, from 2002 to 2004, he appeared in 23 Primeira Liga matches, five of those coming in the second season against the Big Three – three late substitute appearances, three 2–0 away losses; he had previously made his competition debut with Leça, in early 1998.
