= Sladan Peric =

Danish footballer and manager (born 1982)

Slađan Perić
Personal information
- Date of birth: 15 April 1982 (age 44)
- Place of birth: Denmark
- Height: 1.88 m (6 ft 2 in)
- Position: Defender

Youth career
- 1993–1995: B.93
- 1995–2000: KB

Senior career*
Years	Team	Apps	(Gls)
2000–2002	Schalke 04	0	(Perić joined FC Schalke 04 in 2000. Although he did not make a Bundesliga appearance for the first team, he made his senior debut for Schalke 04 in the DFB-Pokal on 1 November 2000, coming on for Ebbe Sand in the 115th minute of Schalke's 3–1 extra-time victory away to FC St. Pauli. He also appeared for FC Schalke 04 II in the DFB-Pokal against VfL Bochum on 26 August 2001. In autumn 2002, Perić returned to Denmark and made his debut for B.93 in a Danish Cup match against Næsby. He remained at the club until 2004, making 57 appearances and scoring once.)
2003–2004	B.93		
2004–2005	Herfølge	23	(3)
2005–2009	Vejle	100	(6)
2009–2014	Vestsjælland	95	(10)
2014	Skovshoved		

International career
2000	Denmark U19	2	(0)

Managerial career
- Copenhagen U19 (assistant)
- 2016: B.93 (assistant)
- * Club domestic league appearances and goals

Slađan Perić (born 15 April 1982) is a Danish former professional footballer who played as a defender.

== Playing career ==
Perić, born in Denmark to Serbian parents, started his career as a youth player in the two clubs in Copenhagen, B93 and KB. His time in KB resulted in the club winning the Danish Championship for youth teams in 2000, which draw a lot of attention to the talented team, even from abroad. This led to Peric being offered a contract from the German Bundesliga club Schalke 04. But the new surroundings proved difficult for him, and he left Gelsenkirchen after two years and returned to Denmark. He turned his back on soccer for a short period and concentrated on getting an education, but when his childhood club B93 offered him a contract, soccer became his main priority again. He then played one season in the club and later joined Herfølge Boldklub. In 2005 Perić signed a contract with Vejle Boldklub, where he made his debut on 3 August 2005 against HIK.
