= Thomas Kahlenberg =

Danish footballer (born 1983)

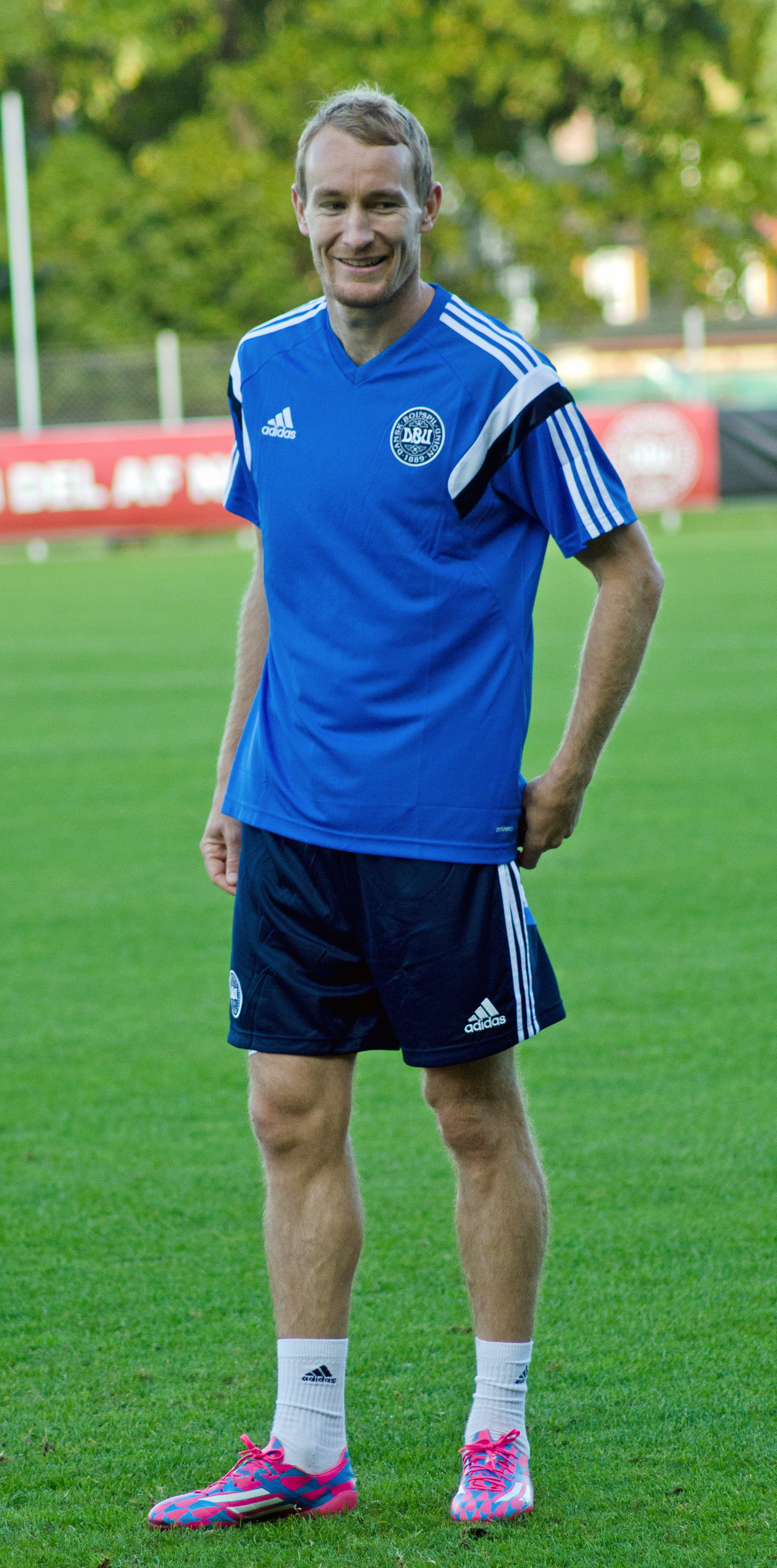
- Kahlenberg training with the Denmark national team in 2014

Personal information
- Full name: Thomas Zeuthen Kahlenberg
- Date of birth: 20 March 1983 (age 43)
- Place of birth: Hvidovre, Denmark
- Height: 1.83 m (6 ft 0 in)
- Position: Attacking midfielder

Youth career
- 1997–1998: Hvidovre
- 1998–2001: Brøndby

Senior career*
| Years | Team | Apps | (Gls) |
| 2001–2005 | Brøndby | 97 | (28) |
| 2005–2009 | Auxerre | 130 | (19) |
| 2009–2013 | VfL Wolfsburg | 39 | (1) |
| 2012 | → Evian (loan) | 15 | (2) |
| 2013–2017 | Brøndby | 57 | (5) |
| Total | | 338 | (55) |

International career
| 1999–2000 | Denmark U17 | 9 | (1) |
| 2000–2002 | Denmark U19 | 7 | (0) |
| 2004 | Denmark U20 | 1 | (0) |
| 2002–2006 | Denmark U21 | 26 | (10) |
| 2003–2015 | Denmark | 47 | (5) |

Managerial career
- 2018–2020: HIK (youth coach)
- 2020–2024: Denmark U16 (assistant)
- * Club domestic league appearances and goals

Thomas Zeuthen Kahlenberg (Danish pronunciation: [ˈkʰɑˀln̩ˌpɛɐ̯ˀ]; born 20 March 1983) is a Danish former professional footballer who played as an attacking midfielder. He started his career with Brøndby IF, winning two Danish Superliga championships, and played abroad at French club Auxerre and German club VfL Wolfsburg. He has played 46 games and scored five goals for the Denmark national team, and represented Denmark at the 2004 European Championship, 2010 FIFA World Cup and 2012 European Championship. He was named 2004 Danish under-21 Player of the Year.

== Club career ==
=== Brøndby ===
Born in Hvidovre, Denmark, Kahlenberg was fifteen years old when he moved from lower-league club Hvidovre IF to Brøndby. Kahlenberg progressed through the ranks at the club's youth system and said that he learned a lot from development to "behaving as a professional footballer". In April 2002, Kahlenberg signed his first professional contract with Brøndby. After the club's youth team coach Tom Køhlert was promoted to head coach, he made his Superliga debut against arch-rivals, København on 12 May 2002, in a 1–1 draw, at the penultimate match of the 2001–02 season and helped Brøndby secure the 2001–02 Danish championship on goal difference. Kahlenberg went on to make two appearances in all competitions.

At the start of the 2002–03 season, Kahlenberg played in the central midfield for Brøndby, where he set up the attacks with his great technique and view for the game. Kahlenberg made his UEFA Champions League debut, coming against Dinamo Tirana in the first leg of the tournament second round, starting a match and played 67 minutes before being substituted, in a 1–0 win. In the return leg, Kahlenberg started the whole game, as he helped the club win 4–0 to progress to the next round. Kahlenberg made an interview over his frustration to score his first goal despite making good chances. But on 10 November 2002 he scored his first goal for Brøndby, in a 1–1 draw against Esbjerg fB. His performance led him to sign a contract extension, keeping him until 2006. Two weeks later on 23 November 2002, Kahlenberg scored his second goal for the club, in a 7–1 win against Farum BK. A month later, he was named Talent of the Year by the Players' Association and Ekstrabladet. His performance attracted interests from European clubs, leading his agent stating Kahlenberg is worth 5 million kroner. He later scored two more goals later in the 2002–03 season, coming against FC Midtjylland and Odense BK. However, Brøndby failed to defend the league title after they ended up finishing second place in the league. Despite this, Kahlenberg helped the club reach the Danish Cup Final after beating AaB 4–1 on aggregate. In the final against FC Midtjylland, he started the whole game, as Brøndby won 3–0 to win the tournament. Despite suffering injuries during the 2002–03 season, he ended the season, making forty–three appearances and scoring four times in all competitions.

At the start of the 2003–04 season, Kahlenberg continued to establish himself in the starting eleven, playing in the central midfield for Brøndby. However, in a match against Viborg on 17 August 2003, he was sent–off for a second bookable offence, in a 2–2 draw and served a one match suspension as a result. Amid to serving a one match suspension, Kahlenberg played in both legs of the UEFA Cup Qualification Round, as he helped the club win 5–0 on aggregate against Dinamo Minsk. Kahlenberg returned to the starting line–up against FC Nordsjælland on 31 August 2003 and set up Brøndby's only goal of the game, in a 1–0 win. This was followed up by scoring his first goal of the season, in a 3–0 win against Akademisk Boldklub. Six days later, on 20 September 2003, he scored his second goal of the season, in a 1–0 win against Nordsjælland. It was announced on 3 October 2003 that Kahlenberg signed a contract with Brøndby, keeping him until 2008. This was followed up by scoring in the next two matches against Esbjerg fB (brace) and AGF. He then scored two more goals by the end of the year. Kahlenberg also played an important role in the UEFA Cup matches when he helped the club beat Viktoria Žižkov and Schalke 04. A month later, Kahlenberg, once again, was named Talent of the Year by the Players' Association and Ekstrabladet. Despite signing a contract with Brøndby, his performance continued to attract interests from European clubs, mostly from Germany, but he ended up staying at the club. Kahlenberg then scored two separate in two separate matches; the first one came between 18 April 2004 and 24 April 2004 against AaB and Viborg respectively; and the second one came between 16 May 2004 and 23 May 2004 against FC Midtjylland and BK Frem. However, Brøndby, once again, finished second in the league. Despite facing setbacks during the 2003–04 season, he went on to make forty–two appearances and scoring twelve times in all competitions, making him the club's top scorer.

In the 2004–05 season, Kahlenberg was moved out as left midfielder, following the sale of Swedish international left winger Mattias Jonson. He started the season well by setting up two goals in the first two league matches of the season. However, Kahlenberg was sent–off for a second bookable offence against FK Ventspils in the second leg of the UEFA Cup second round qualification, as the club were eliminated from the tournament. On 25 September 2004 Kahlenberg scored twice for the club, as they won 4–1 against Herfølge Boldklub. He later scored three more goals, including a brace against AGF on 21 November 2004. Cutting into the field from his wide position, Kahlenberg scored eight more goals, including a two braces against København and Herfølge Boldklub. Kahlenberg managed to become Brøndby's 2004–05 league top goal scorer with 13 goals. He also helped the club win the Double, both the league and Danish Cup. At the end of the 2004–05 season, Kahlenberg went on to make forty appearances and scoring thirteen times in all competitions.

By the time he departed the club, Kahlenberg played a combined total of 130 games for Brøndby IF, including 97 games and 28 goals in the Danish Superliga championship. Since leaving Brøndby, the club would suffered a set-back when they find themselves in relegation threatening and economic problems. Kahlenberg expressed sadness and sympathy of the club of what they been through.

=== Auxerre ===
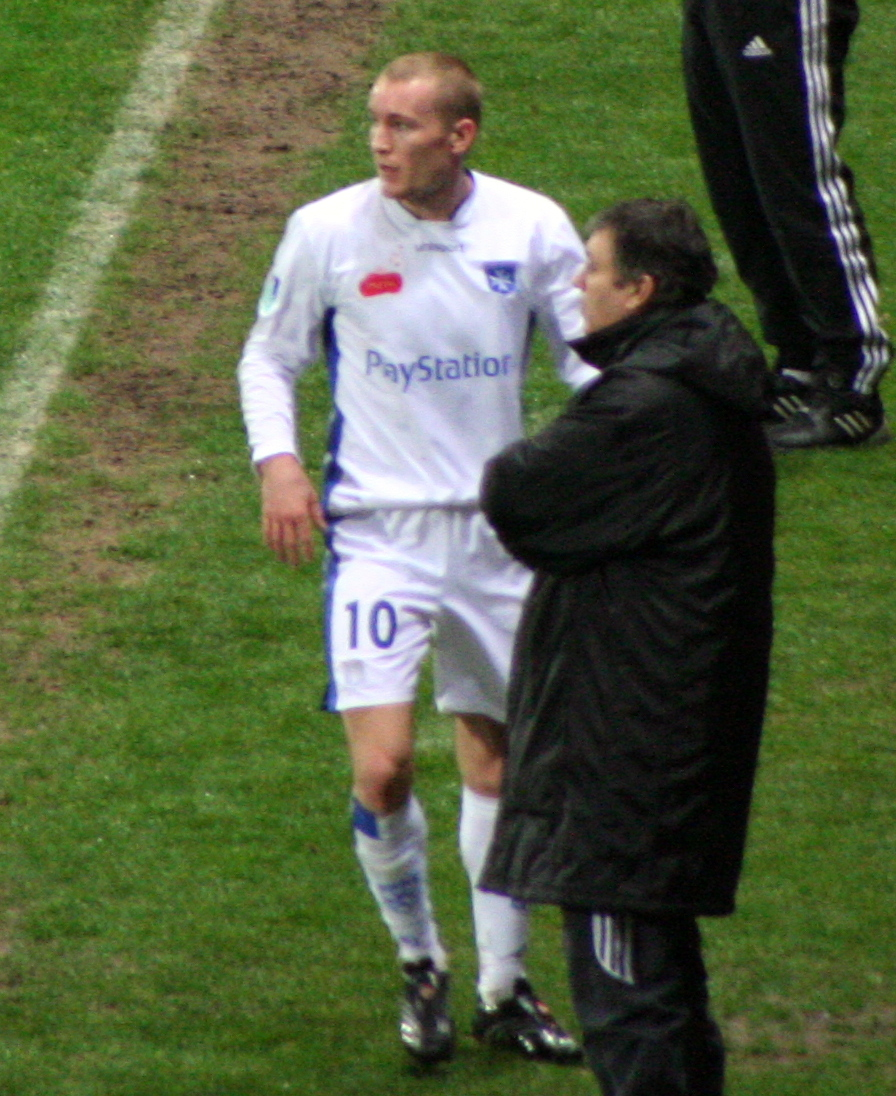
Kahlenberg playing for Ligue 1 side Auxerre in 2006.

It was announced on 13 July 2005 that the French club Auxerre signed Kahlenberg on a four–year contract with the club for a fee of £2.5 million (30 million. kr). After the move, Kahlenberg says he is looking forward to play in Ligue 1.

Kahlenberg made his debut for Auxerre debut, starting the whole game, in a 4–1 loss against Lyon in the Trophée des Champions. In a follow–up match, he made his league debut for the club, starting the whole game, in a 0–0 draw against Strasbourg in the opening game of the season. Since joining Auxerre, Kahlenberg quickly established himself in the starting eleven, playing in the midfield position. On 24 September 2005 he scored his first goal for the club, in a 3–0 win against Sochaux. Kahlenberg then scored his second goal of the season, as well as, setting up one of Auxerre's goals, in a 2–1 win against AS Monaco on 5 January 2006. Following the match, he was named Team of the Week by L’Equipe. This was followed up by scoring against Olympique Noisy-le-Sec in the first round of the Coupe de France. Kahlenberg scored his fourth goal of the season, in a 2–0 win against Rennes on 28 January 2006. He later scored five more goals later in the 2005–06 season, including two consecutive goals in two separate matches. Kahlenberg also made the most assists of all players in the 2005–06 championship season. In his first season at the club, he went on to make forty–three appearances and scoring nine times in all competitions.

At the start of the 2006–07 season, Kahlenberg started the season well when he scored his first goal of the season to help Auxerre beat Farul Constanța 4–2 on aggregate in the third round of the UEFA Intertoto Cup. Kahlenberg continued to establish himself in the first team, playing in the midfield position. He then played a role for Auxerre by setting up two goals, in a 2–1 win against AS Monaco on 9 September 2006. Kahlenberg scored his first goal of the season a week later on 20 September 2006, in a 2–0 win against Strasbourg. He helped the club beat Dinamo Zagreb 5–2 on aggregate to reach the group stage of the UEFA Cup. However, during a 1–0 loss against Lens on 28 October 2006, Kahlenberg suffered a knee injury and was substituted in the 9th minute; and was sidelined somewhere between six and eight weeks. On 6 January 2007 he scored on his return to the starting line–up against Chamois Niortais in the first round of Coupe de France, as the club lost 5–4 in a penalty shootout following a 2–2 draw. Three weeks later on 28 January 2007 when Kahlenberg scored his fourth goal of the season, as well as, setting up one of Auxerre's goals, in a 2–0 win against AS Nancy. He later scored three more goals later in the season, including scoring consecutive goals coming against Lille and Valenciennes in the last two remaining matches of the 2006–07 season. In his second season at the club, Kahlenberg went on to make thirty–nine appearances and scoring seven times in all competitions. At some point during the 2006–07 season, he signed a contract extension with the club, keeping him until 2010.

Ahead of the 2007–08 season, Kahlenberg was linked a move away from Auxerre, with European clubs wanted to sign him, but he ended up staying at the club. At the start of the 2007–08 season, Kahlenberg continued to establish himself in the first team, playing in the midfield position. He then helped Auxerre with a hat–trick of assists, in a 5–3 win against Lorient on 20 October 2007. On 10 November 2007 Kahlenberg scored his first goal of the season, in a 1–1 draw against Sochaux. This was followed up by providing two assists, in a 3–0 win against Le Mans. This was also followed by scoring his second goal of the season, in a 1–0 win against Metz on 1 December 2007. He then captained the club for the first time against Saint-Étienne on 6 January 2008 in the first round of Coupe de France and scored his third goal of the season, in a 3–2 win after playing extra time. However, Kahlenberg suffered a knee injury that kept him out for a month. On 5 April 2008 he returned to the first team from injury, coming on as a 72nd-minute substitute, in a 1–0 loss against Sochaux. Since returning from injury, Kahlenberg was featured in the last remaining six matches of the 2007–08 season. In his third season at Auxerre, he went on to make thirty–nine appearances and scoring seven times in all competitions.

At the start of the 2008–09 season, Kahlenberg suffered a hip injury while on international duty and was sidelined for a month. On 13 September 2008 he returned to the starting line–up from injury and set up Auxerre's opening goal of the game, in a 1–1 draw against AS Nancy. Two weeks later on 27 September 2008, Kahlenberg scored his first goal of the season, as well as, setting up one of the club's goals, in a 3–0 win against Le Havre. Since the start of the 2008–09 season, he continued to establish himself in the first team, playing in the midfield position. In a match against Lille on 14 February 2009, Kahlenberg set up Auxerre's second goal of the game, but was sent–off in the 78th minute, as the club won 2–0. After a successful appeal, he returned to the starting line–up against Le Havre in a follow–up and scored his third goal of the season, in a 2–0 win. Kahlenberg later scored three more goals later in the 2008–09 season, coming against Lyon, Sochaux and Monaco. In his fourth season at Auxerre, he went on to make thirty–seven appearances and scoring times times in all competitions. In his four seasons at Auxerre, Kahlenberg played 130 games and scored 19 goals in the Ligue 1.

=== VfL Wolfsburg ===
In May 2009, Kahlenberg signed a four-year contract with the defending German champions Wolfsburg for a €4 million transfer fee, effective from the end of the season. He was also linked with a move to La Liga side Getafe before decided to move to Die Wölfe instead.

Immediately after joining the club, Kahlenberg suffered a hip injury which kept him out until October 2009. While on the sidelines, he was dropped from Wolfsburg's 25-man squad for the UEFA Champions League. Kahlenberg made his Bundesliga debut for Wolfsburg in the 3–3 draw with Mainz on 31 October 2009. However, since returning from injury, Kahlenberg struggled to make his progress into the first team at Wolfsburg, having failed to make an impact and found his playing time from the substitute bench. This led to him contemplated his future at the club, as it could affect his chances of being chosen in the FIFA World Cup. Despite this, he went on to make twelve appearances in all competitions. Following this, Kahlenberg, along with Karim Ziani, was informed by the club that they are no longer needed.

Having started out on the substitute bench at the start of the 2010–11 season, Kahlenberg was featured more often in the first team for the next two months, under new manager Steve McClaren. On 2 October 2010, he soon scored his first goal for the club, in a 1–1 draw against Borussia Mönchengladbach. By November, however, Kahlenberg found his playing time, mostly from the substitute bench. In mid-February, both he and Alexander Madlung, were suspended by Wolfsburg's interim manager Pierre Littbarski, citing lack of commitment. A month after his suspension, Kahlenberg went on trial with English Premier League side Blackburn Rovers, but did not earn a contract. On 14 May 2011 he returned to the first team in the last game of the season against 1899 Hoffenheim, starting a match and played 57 minutes before being substituted, in a 3–1 win. At the end of the 2010–11 season, Kahlenberg went on to make seventeen appearances and scoring once in all competitions.

Ahead of the 2011–12 season, Kahlenberg was considering leaving Wolfsburg as a result of lack of first team opportunities, but ended up staying at the club. Amid to his future at Wolfsburg, Manager Felix Magath placed him to VfL Wolfsburg II. He also faced with his own injury concern along the way. In November, Magath announced that Kahlenberg, along with Patrick Helmes, would not be needed at the club. By the time he was loaned out to Evian, Kahlenberg made no appearances for Wolfsburg.

After a loan spell at Evian, Kahlenberg returned to Wolfsburg's pre–season training ahead of the 2012–13 season. However, he continued to remain in the club's transfer list and wasn't given a squad number. Kahlenberg was given a number 38 shirt and made his first appearance of Wolfsburg, starting the whole game, in a 0–0 draw against FC Augsburg on 14 September 2012. In a follow–up match against Greuther Fürth, he set up the club's equalising goal, in a 1–1 draw. After the match, Manager Magath praised his performance. However, Kahlenberg continued to find his playing time, mostly from the substitute bench for the rest of the 2012–13 season. He also faced sidelining on three occasions along the way. But on 15 March 2013, Kahlenberg was given a rare start against Fortuna Düsseldorf, starting a match and played 74 minutes before being substituted, as Wolfsburg drew 1–1, in what turned out to be his last appearance. At the end of the 2012–13 season, he went on to make thirteen appearances in all competitions. Following this, Kahlenberg was released by the club.

=== Evian (loan) ===
In January transfer window in 2012, it announced that Kahlenberg has returned to Ligue 1, but joined Evian on loan, until the end of the 2011–12 season. Upon moving to the club, he was joined by compatriots Daniel Wass, Stephan Andersen and Christian Poulsen and was also given the eleven number shirt. Kahlenberg had been linked a move to Saint-Étienne.

He made his debut for Evian on 14 January 2012, coming on as a substitute for Cédric Barbosa in the 61st minute, in a 3–1 loss against Dijon. Since joining the club, Kahlenberg was involved in a number of matches for the rest of the 2011–12 season. On 17 March 2012, he scored his first goal for the club, in a 2–0 win over against his former club, Auxerre. After the match, Kahlenberg is expected to join Evian on a permanent deal at the end of the season. On 1 May 2012, he scored his second goal for the club, in a 2–2 draw against Montpellier. In an interview with the Sporten, Kahlenberg says if he never moved to Evian, then he would dead and buried. At the end of the 2011–12 season, Kahlenberg went on to make nineteen appearances and scoring two times in all competitions.

However, his hopes of permanent move to the club was apparently broken down after Wolfsburg's reluctance to discuss a fee, resulting in its cancellation. Once again, he was linked with a move to Saint-Étienne after the club rekindled his interests signing him. However, according to Kahlenberg, the move never materialised.

=== Brøndby ===
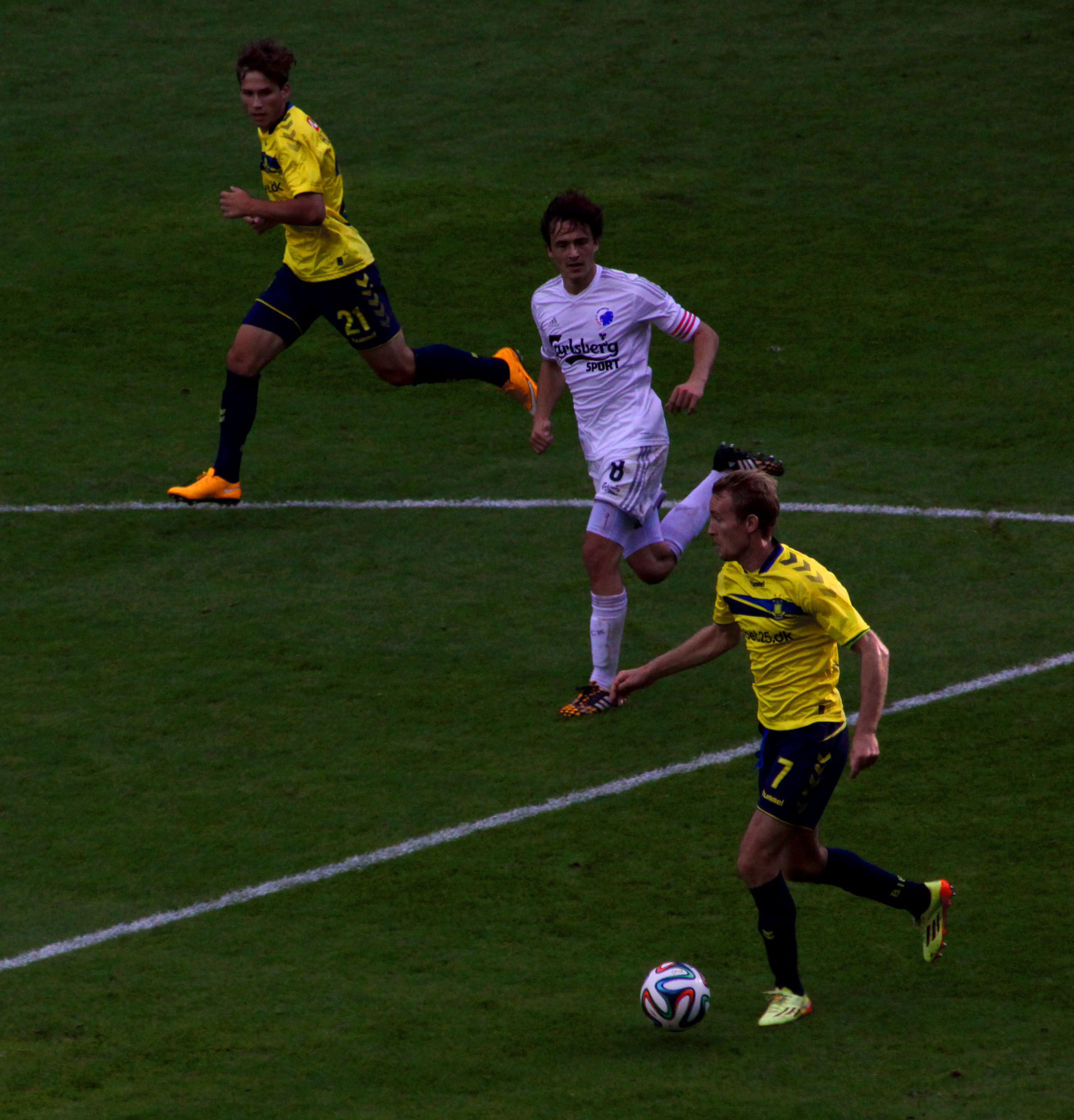
Kahlenberg dribbling to attack during a match between Brøndby and København on 21 September 2014.

On 21 August 2013, Kahlenberg signed a four-year contract with his former club Brøndby after being away from Denmark for eight years. Upon joining the club, he expressed his delight to return to Brøndby, calling it a "special place for him" and was given a number seven shirt.

Kahlenberg made his second debut for the club, starting a match and playing 88 minutes before being substituted, in a 0–0 draw against Randers on 25 August 2013. Since making his debut for Brøndby, he started in the next five matches for the club, playing in the midfield position. However, Kahlenberg suffered an injury that kept him out for a month. On 24 November 2013, he returned to the first team, coming on as a 66th-minute substitute, in a 1–0 win against FC Midtjylland. Following an injury of Mikkel Thygesen, Kahlenberg was appointed captain in his absence. He captained his first match for Brøndby, starting a match and played 62 minutes before being substituted, in a 3–1 loss against Copenhagen on 1 December 2013. Kahlenberg then continued to establish himself in the starting eleven for the club, playing in the midfield position, as well as, being the captain. He then scored his first goal of the season, as well as, setting up one of Brøndby's goals, in a 2–2 draw against AaB on 23 February 2014. Two weeks later on 9 March 2014, Kahlenberg set up two goals, as he helped the club win 4–1 against Nordsjælland. On 21 April 2014, he scored his second goal of the season, in a 2–1 win against AGF. After missing a match due to suspension, Kahlenberg returned to the starting line–up against Nordsjælland in the last game of the season and set up two goals, as Brøndby drew 2–2. His performance throughout the 2013–14 season led the club's supporters to name him the best player in the league. In his first season back at Brøndby, he went to make twenty–four appearances and scoring two times in all competitions.

Ahead of the start of the 2014–15 season, it was announced that Kahlenberg was named as Thygesen's successor as Brøndby's new captain. He continued to establish himself in the starting eleven for the club, playing in the midfield position, as well as, being the captain. On 31 August 2014, Kahlenberg scored his first goal of the season, as well as, setting up one of Brøndby's goals, in a 3–0 win against FC Nordsjælland. In a match against AaB on 5 October 2014, he set up a goal for Teemu Pukki, who went on to score twice to help the club win 2–1. This was followed up by scoring his second goal of the season, in a 5–0 win against Vestsjælland. Reflecting in the first half of the season, Kahlenberg said: "We have a high top level, and on our good days we are perhaps the best playing team in Denmark. But we have also seen that we have a too low bottom level and have been too easy to kiss. So that is our biggest challenge. The most disappointing have been the outcomes we have had in three or four matches, where the bottom level has simply been too low. We have, of course, been disappointed in ourselves. Also on behalf of the club and the supporters. We have felt a little stupid." However, he suffered a hip injury that eventually sidelined for the rest of the 2014–15 season. It was announced that Kahlenberg would be out somewhere between four and five months following surgery. In his second season at the club, he went on to make twenty–four appearances and scoring two times in all competitions.

The 2015–16 season continued to see Kahlenberg recover from a hip injury and made a full recovery and returned to training by late–August. On 27 September 2015, he made his first appearance of the season, coming on as a 62nd-minute substitute, in a 1–0 win against Copenhagen. Kahlenberg captained his first match of the season, coming against FC Midtjylland on 25 October 2015 and set up Brøndby's second goal of the game, in a 2–1 win. A week later on 1 November 2015, he scored his first goal of the season, in a 5–2 win against Odense BK. Kahlenberg then found himself competing in the midfield position for a starting place for the club, which saw him placed on the substitute bench as a result. On 2 March 2016, he scored his second goal of the season, in a 3–0 win against Skive in the quarter–finals of the Danish Cup. A month later, however, Kahlenberg suffered a thigh injury that kept him out for the rest of the 2015–16 season. In his third season at Brøndby, he went on to make eighteen appearances and scoring two times in all competitions.

Most of the 2016–17 season saw Kahlenberg continuing to recover from a thigh injury. By February, he stated in an interview about his aim to return in playing in the league just before the season ends and successfully predicted his return in April. In May 2017, Kahlenberg returned to the substitute bench for a match against FC Midtjylland as Brøndby 4–2. After returning to play for the club's reserve, Kahlenberg made his first league appearance of the season, coming on as a second-half substitute, in a 3–0 loss against SønderjyskE on 21 May 2017. He made his first start as captain of the season and played 48 minutes before being substituted, in a 2–1 loss against FC Nordsjælland in the last game of the season. While being substituted, Kahlenberg received a standing ovation from Brøndby's supporters. At the end of the 2016–17 season, he went on to make appearances for the side in all competitions.

On 28 May 2017, Kahlenberg announced his retirement from professional football, fulfilling his promises he made two years ago.

== International career ==
=== Youth career ===
While playing youth football at Brøndby IF, Kahlenberg played a number of games for various Danish youth national teams on under-17 and under-19 levels from August 1999 to February 2002.

In September 2002, Kahlenberg, who was recognized as one of the most talented Danish midfielders, was called up to Denmark under-21 national team for the first time. In his third appearance for the U21 side against Bosnia and Herzegovina U21 on 1 April 2003, he set up two goals, as Denmark U21 won 3–0. Later in the year, Kahlenberg played in both legs of the UEFA European Under-21 Championship qualification play-offs against Italy U21, as the U21 side lost through away goal following a 1–1 draw. In December 2004, he subsequently won the 2004 Danish under-21 Player of the Year award. Following UEFA European Under-21 Football Championship's qualification, Poulsen was called up to the Denmark U21 squad in November 2005. He played in both legs against Russia U21, as the U21 side won 4–1 on aggregate. Kahlenberg continued to play for the Denmark under-21 team until May 2006, when he was selected for the Danish squad for the 2006 European Under-21 Championship. As age restrictions are calculated from the start of the qualification matches, in September 2006, he competed in the tournament at age 23. Even though Denmark was eliminated in the preliminary group stage, Kahlenberg managed to score three goals in three games, and he was selected for the "Team of the Tournament". He ended his under-21 national team career after the tournament, having scored 10 goals in 26 matches for the Denmark under-21s.

=== Senior career ===
In April 2003, the senior national team coach Morten Olsen called Kahlenberg to the squad for the first time. He made his debut for the national team, coming on as a 76th-minute substitute, in a 1–0 friendly win against Ukraine on 30 April 2003. In March 2004, Kahlenberg was called up to the senior squad once and made his second appearance for Denmark, coming on as a 78th-minute substitute, in a 2–0 loss against Spain on 31 March 2004. In May 2004, he was selected as the youngest Danish player for the 2004 European Championship. However, Kahlenberg did not play any games at the tournament, as he was placed on the substitute bench.

In August 2005, Kahlenberg was called up to the national team for the first time in ten months and came on as a second-half substitute, in a 4–1 win against England on 17 August 2005. On 16 August 2006 he made his first start for Denmark, starting the whole game, in a 2–0 win against Poland. Two weeks later on 1 September 2006, Kahlenberg scored his first goal for Denmark, as well as, setting up of the national side's goals, in a 4–2 win against Portugal. He was involved in a number of matches for Denmark's qualifying matches for the UEFA Euro 2008, as they failed to qualify for the tournament after finishing fourth place. Despite this, scored his second goal for Denmark, in a 3–0 win against Iceland on 21 November 2007.

After a lay-off from the senior national team, Kahlenberg was recalled for the 2010 World Cup qualifiers. In his second start of the qualifiers, he scored the winning goal against rivals Sweden, which helped Denmark qualify for the main tournament. In May 2010, Morten Olsen announced that Kahlenberg would be part of the final squad of 23 participating in the FIFA World Cup in South Africa. He made his tournament debut against Netherlands, starting a match and played 73 minutes before being substituted, as Denmark lost 2–0 on 14 June 2010. Kahlenberg appeared two more times in the tournament, as the national side were eliminated in the group stage.

Following the World Cup tournament, Kahlenberg was called up to the Denmark squad two months later. He scored his first national team goal, in a 1–0 win against Iceland on 7 September 2010. Kahlenberg later made one more appearance for Denmark by the end of the year. After a two-year absence, Kahlenberg was called up to the national team squad for Euro 2012. He made his first Denmark in two years, starting a match and played 65 minutes before being substituted, in a 3–1 loss against Brazil on 26 May 2012. This was followed up by making another appearance against Australia on 2 June 2012, coming on as a second-half substitute, as the national team lost 2–0. However, Kahlenberg did not play in the tournament and was placed on the substitute bench, as Denmark were eliminated in the group stage.

After a one and a half year absent, on 3 March 2014 Kahlenberg was called up to the Denmark squad against England but did not play. On 22 May 2014 he made his first appearance for the national side in two years, coming on as a 79th-minute substitute, in a 2–2 draw against Hungary. Four months later on 7 September 2014, Kahlenberg scored his fifth goal for Denmark, in a 2–1 win against Armenia. The next two years saw him play four more times in the national team's qualifying matches, as Denmark failed to qualify for the UEFA Euro 2016 following a 4–3 defeat on aggregate. Following this, he was never called up to the national team again despite being available.

== Coaching career ==
After announcing his retirement from professional football, he moved to coaching. He was hired as a youth coach at HIK in March 2018. After two years in HIK, on 28 May 2020, Kahlenberg was appointed assistant coach of Denmark's U-16 national team. He left the position in July 2024.

== Personal life ==
In August 2009, Kahlenberg married his long–term girlfriend, Anne Zeuthen Jensen. They have three children, daughters Karla and Alma and son, Max.

In addition to speaking Danish, Kahlenberg speaks German, having learned the language from school, and French, from his time at Auxerre. In September 2003, he hired Per Steffensen as his new agent in attempt to move abroad. He attended Falkonergårdens Gymnasium. Early in his football career, Kahlenberg quickly earned a fan club called 'Tommy Crew'.

In December 2004, Kahlenberg was in Thailand when Indian Ocean earthquake and tsunami took place, but escaped unharmed. Throughout his professional football career, he lived in Denmark, France and Germany.

On 5 March 2020, Kahlenberg tested positive for the novel coronavirus disease called COVID-19 during the current pandemic, after having been infected at a birthday party in Amsterdam. This forced Brøndby, Lyngby and Ajax to place some of their players and coaches, who had recently met with Kahlenberg, into quarantine. Kahlenberg described his symptoms as similar to a flu and he was placed in home quarantine. Peter Madsen, another retired Danish football player who attended the same Amsterdam birthday party as Kahlenberg, also tested positive for the coronavirus. On 12 March, Kahlenberg was declared fully recovered.

== Career statistics ==
=== International ===
Appearances and goals by national team and year
| National team | Year | Apps | Goals |
|---|---|---|---|
| Denmark | 2003 | 1 | 0 |
| Denmark | 2004 | 2 | 0 |
| Denmark | 2005 | 3 | 0 |
| Denmark | 2006 | 5 | 1 |
| Denmark | 2007 | 12 | 1 |
| Denmark | 2008 | 2 | 0 |
| Denmark | 2009 | 3 | 1 |
| Denmark | 2010 | 8 | 1 |
| Denmark | 2011 | 0 | 0 |
| Denmark | 2012 | 3 | 0 |
| Denmark | 2013 | 0 | 0 |
| Denmark | 2014 | 7 | 1 |
| Denmark | 2015 | 1 | 0 |
| Total | | 47 | 5 |

Scores and results list Denmark's goal tally first, score column indicates score after each Kahlenberg goal.

List of international goals scored by Thomas Kahlenberg
| No. | Date | Venue | Opponent | Score | Result | Competition |
|---|---|---|---|---|---|---|
| 1 | 1 September 2006 | Brøndby Stadion, Copenhagen, Denmark | Portugal | 2–1 | 4–2 | Friendly |
| 2 | 21 November 2007 | Telia Parken, Copenhagen, Denmark | Iceland | 3–0 | 3–0 | UEFA Euro 2008 Qualification |
| 3 | 6 June 2009 | Råsundastadion, Solna, Sweden | Sweden | 1–0 | 1–0 | FIFA World Cup 2010 Qualification |
| 4 | 7 September 2010 | Telia Parken, Copenhagen, Denmark | Iceland | 1–0 | 1–0 | UEFA Euro 2012 Qualification |
| 5 | 7 September 2014 | Telia Parken, Copenhagen, Denmark | Armenia | 2–1 | 2–1 | UEFA Euro 2016 Qualification |

== Honours ==
Brøndby IF

- Danish Superliga: 2001–02, 2004–05
- Danish Cup: 2002–03, 2004–05

Individual

- Danish U-21 Player of the Year: 2004
