= Claus Madsen =

Danish footballer and coach (born 1975)

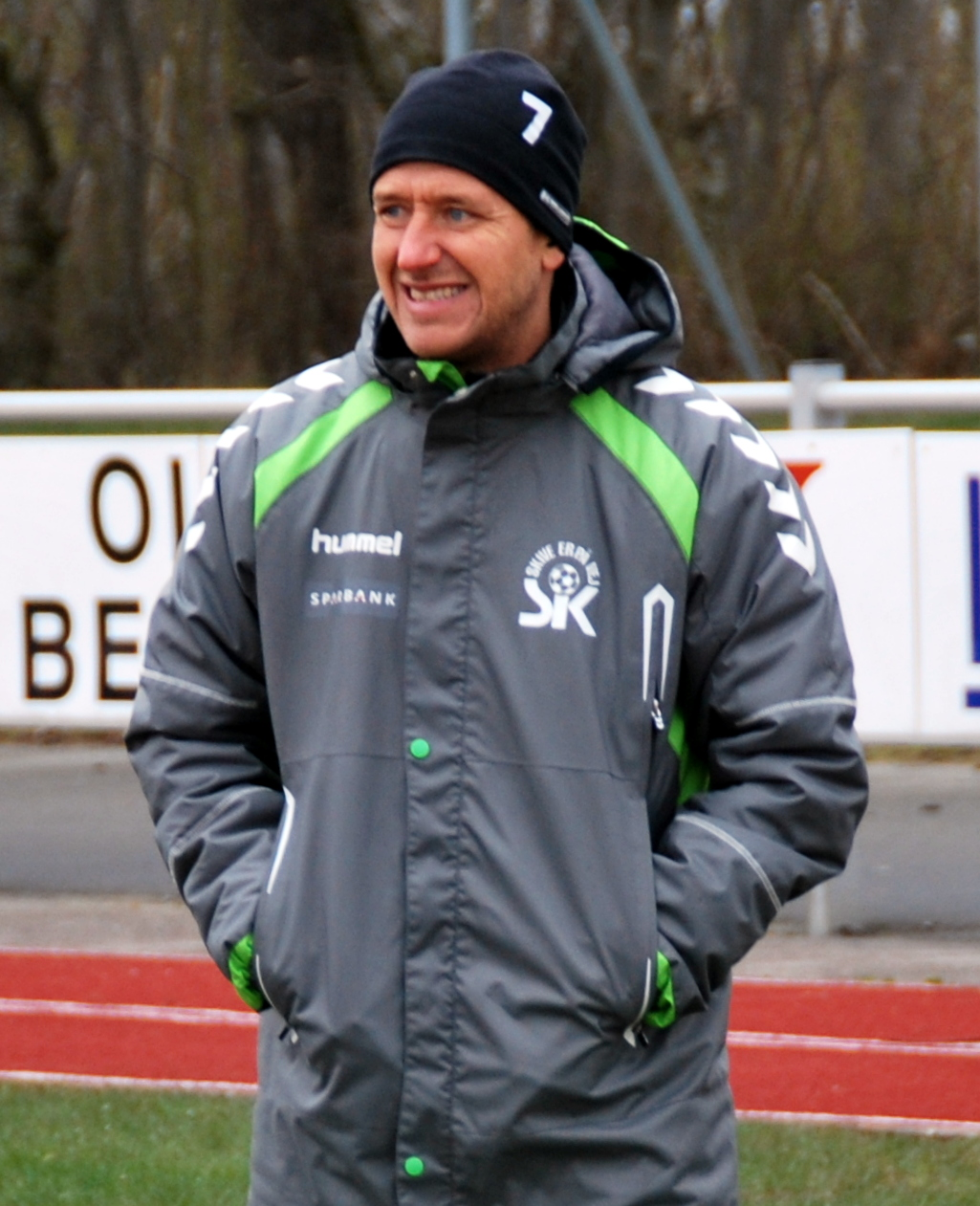
- Claus Madsen in April 2012.

Personal information
- Date of birth: March 11, 1975 (age 51)
- Place of birth: Odense, Denmark
- Height: 1.80 m (5 ft 11 in)
- Position: Midfielder

Team information
- Current team: Næsby (assistant)

Senior career*
Years	Team	Apps	(Gls)
1995	Nørre Aaby		
1998–2002	OB	56	(6)
2002–2009	Midtjylland	126	(8)
2021	Bording IF		

Managerial career
- 2010–2013: Skive (assistant)
- 2013–2014: Skive
- 2014: Skive (assistant)
- 2014–2015: Fredericia (assistant)
- 2022–: Næsby (assistant)
- * Club domestic league appearances and goals

Claus Madsen (born March 11, 1975) is a Danish former football player who played as a midfielder and current assistant coach of Næsby Boldklub.

In his active career, Madsen played for Danish Superliga clubs FC Midtjylland and Odense BK, winning the 2002 Danish Cup with Odense.

== Career ==
=== Club career ===
Madsen made his Superliga debut with Odense BK in July 1999, and spent three seasons with the club, winning the 2002 Danish Cup. When Odense manager Troels Bech moved to league rivals FC Midtjylland (FCM) in the summer 2002, Madsen joined him, and went on to become a mainstay in the FCM. Madsen spent seven seasons with FCM, scoring eight goals in 126 Superliga games for the club. Known for a good technique, he suffered from an increasing number of injuries, and decided to end his career in January 2010.

=== Coaching and later career ===
He went on to coach second-tier club Skive IK, with former FCM teammate Michael Hansen as manager.

On June 24, 2013 got promoted and was assigned lead manager of Skive IK, as the club got relegated and the former manager left the club, leaving the manager seat empty. The club had many candidates but found that Claus Madsen was the perfect choice and the right manager to lead Skive IK to win the division and earn promotion to move back up to the Danish 1st Division. On 5 March 2014 he resigned as manager of Skive for personal reasons.

In July 2021 46-year old Madsen revealed, that he would play for Danish amateur club Bording IF, where his former FC Midtjylland teammate, Christopher Poulsen, also was playing. In February 2022 it was confirmed, that Madsen had left Bording, as he had been appointed assistant coach of Næsby Boldklub.

== Honours ==
- 2002 Danish Cup

Sporting positions
Preceded by (Denmark) Kristian Bak Nielsen	F.C. Midtjylland captain 2007-2008	Succeeded by (Denmark) Mikkel Thygesen
