= Kristian Bach Bak =

Danish footballer (born 1982)

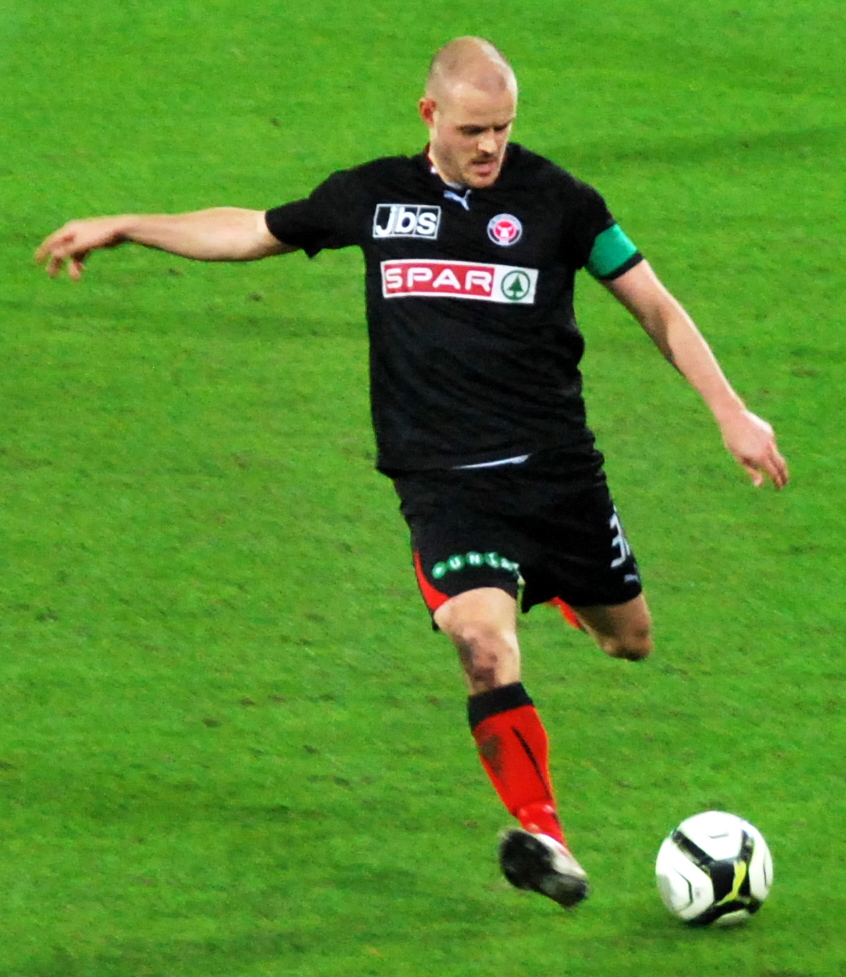

Personal information
- Date of birth: 20 October 1982 (age 44)
- Place of birth: Kibæk, Denmark
- Height: 1.82 m (6 ft 0 in)
- Positions: Centre-back; right-back

Team information
- Current team: Midtjylland (assistant)

Youth career
- –1998: Kibæk IF
- 1998–2000: Ikast fS

Senior career*
Years	Team	Apps	(Gls)
2000–2007	Midtjylland	138	(8)
2007–2010	Heerenveen	72	(6)
2010–2016	Midtjylland	122	(9)
Total		332	(23)

International career
2003	Denmark U21	1	(0)

Managerial career
- 2016–: Midtjylland (assistant)
- * Club domestic league appearances and goals

Kristian Bach Bak (né Bak Nielsen; born 20 October 1982) is a Danish former professional footballer. Bak usually played centre-back, but he has a past as a striker. He has played one game for the Danish under-21 national team.

== Club career ==
=== Midtjylland ===
Born in Kibæk, Herning Municipality, Bak's first football club was Kibæk IF, but he already started began playing in the youth department of Ikast fS at age 16. Ikast fS later merged with Herning Fremad and created FC Midtjylland.

Bak started his senior career with Midtjylland in 2000. He helped the club win the 1999–2000 Danish 1st Division and gain promotion to the Danish Superliga. In his first years at the club, he played as a striker, but eventually settled as a centre-back.

He played all Midtjylland's matches during the 2003–04 Danish Superliga season and was rewarded with a new contract in November 2004, keeping him at the club until 2007. In 2005, he became the club's captain.

=== Heerenveen ===
On 19 June 2007, Bak signed a four-year contract with the Dutch Eredivisie club SC Heerenveen. He was sidelined with an ankle injury from the end of the December 2007. He made his league return on 5 October 2008 in a 5–2 win over Ajax. He played a total of 72 league matches for Heerenveen through three seasons. On 10 February 2010 he was fined €1,000 by the Royal Dutch Football Association (KNVB) prosecutor for allegations against referee Kevin Blom. Bak was also given a conditional suspension of one match. He had claimed after a 2–1 loss to ADO Den Haag that Blom had deliberately let the opponent win: "After the 1–1, I asked Blom what he was doing. He said he wanted ADO to win," he told on the Heerenveen website.

=== Return to Midtjylland ===
In August 2010, Bak returned to Midtjylland on a four-year deal. On 21 May 2015, he won the first national title of his career, winning the Superliga after a 0–0 draw against Vestsjælland.

== International career ==
Bak was first called up for the Danish under-21 national team in October 2003. He played a single under-21 national match, against the Bosnia and Herzegovina under-21s. He replaced Thomas Kahlenberg in the extra time of the second half, in a match which Denmark won 3–0.

On 20 November 2006, he was called up for the Denmark League XI, playing unofficial games against the United States, El Salvador and Honduras in January 2007, by national team manager Morten Olsen. He was called up for the Danish national team in March 2007 as a replacement for the injured Per Nielsen.

== Coaching and later career ==
After he retired from football in 2016, he was announced as the new assistant coach of the club.

In May 2019, Bak joined Denmark Series 4 amateur club TIF All Stars.

In June 2022, Bak changed position in Midtjylland to assistant Sporting Director.

== Personal life ==
Bak married Diana Bach on 16 November 2013, and on that occasion changed his name from Kristian Bak Nielsen to Kristian Bach Bak.

== Honours ==
Midtjylland

- Superliga: 2014–15
- 1st Division: 1999–2000

Heerenveen

- KNVB Cup: 2008–09

Sporting positions
Preceded by Mikkel Thygesen	FC Midtjylland captain 2011–2016	Succeeded by Jakob Poulsen
