= Dennis Sørensen =

Danish footballer (born 1981)

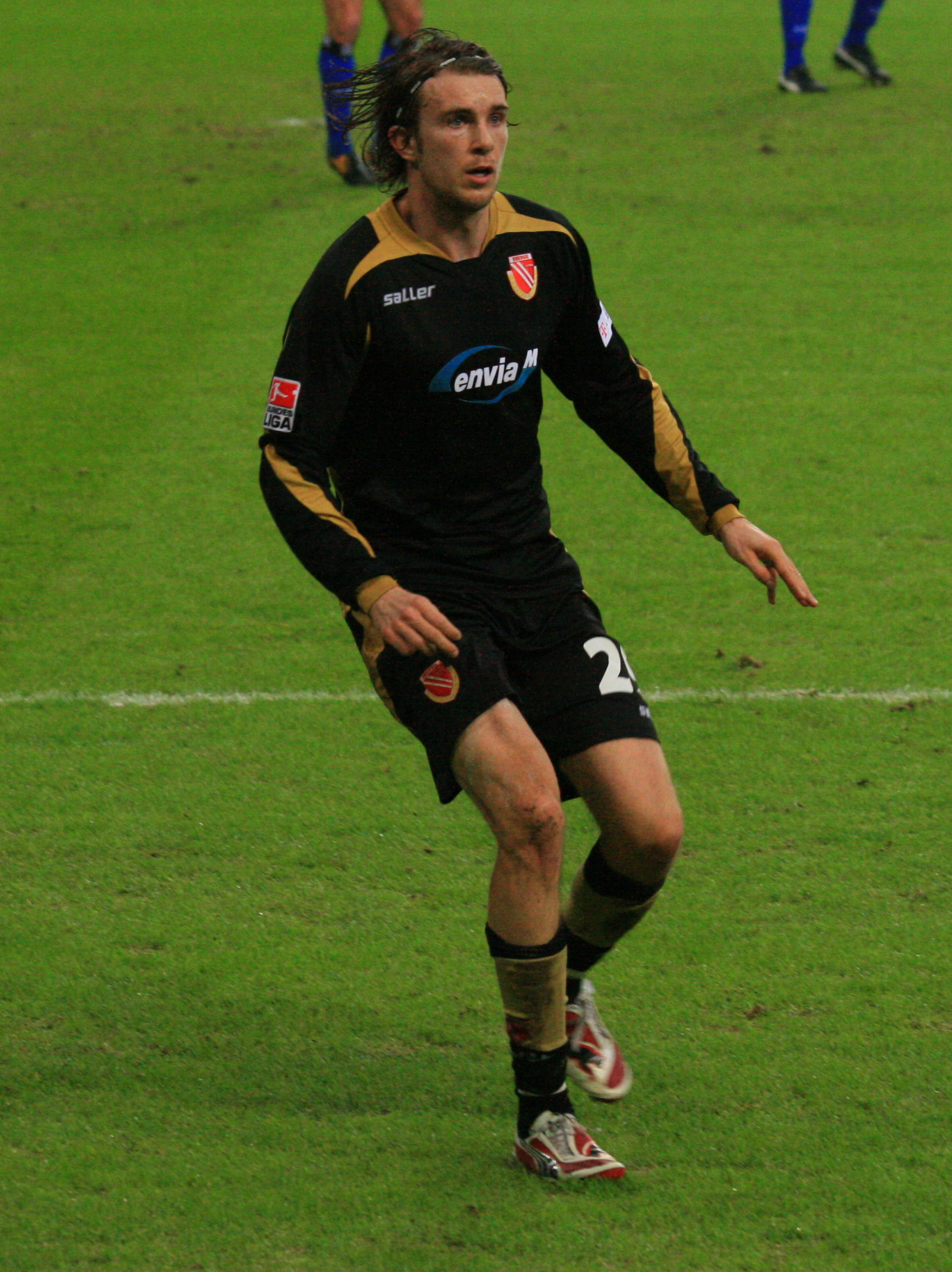

Personal information
- Full name: Dennis Dechmann Sørensen
- Date of birth: 24 May 1981 (age 45)
- Place of birth: Herlev, Denmark
- Height: 1.93 m (6 ft 4 in)
- Positions: Winger; striker

Youth career
- Skovlunde IF
- Farum BK

Senior career*
Years	Team	Apps	(Gls)
1999–2004	FC Nordsjælland	51	(5)
2004–2007	FC Midtjylland	102	(25)
2007–2013	Energie Cottbus	128	(15)
2013–2015	FC Vestsjælland	60	(8)
2015–2016	Lyngby BK	14	(1)

International career
1999–2000	Denmark U19	7	(1)
2002	Denmark U20	4	(0)
2000–2003	Denmark U21	23	(2)
2006	Denmark	5	(0)
- * Club domestic league appearances and goals as of 21 June 2016

Dennis Dechmann Sørensen (sometimes Sörensen) (born 24 May 1981 in Herlev) is a Danish retired professional footballer.

== Career ==
From 2000 to 2003, he played 23 games and scored two goals for the Denmark national under-21 football team. He started his senior career for Farum BK (later known as FC Nordsjælland) in 1999, before moving to FC Midtjylland in 2004. In 2007, he moved to FC Energie Cottbus where he played 128 matches and scored 15 goals, before returning to Denmark in 2013, to play for FC Vestsjælland. He played his first game for FCV against Brøndby IF on 21 July 2013. Sørensen scored a goal and the game ended 1–1.

Sørensen had his first cap for the Denmark national football team on 11 October 2006 vs. Liechtenstein.
