= Rasmus Daugaard =

Danish footballer (born 1976)

Personal information
- Full name: Rasmus Daugaard Hansen
- Date of birth: 15 September 1976 (age 50)
- Place of birth: Copenhagen, Denmark
- Height: 1.85 m (6 ft 1 in)
- Position: Defender

Senior career*
Years	Team	Apps	(Gls)
1996–1999	Ølstykke		
1999–2003	AB	116	(7)
2003–2006	Midtjylland	77	(4)
2006–2007	Lyn	17	(1)
2007–2008	Lyngby		
2016–2021	FC Græsrødderne		
- * Club domestic league appearances and goals

Rasmus Daugaard (born September 15, 1976) is a Danish retired professional footballer. He played 210 games in the Danish Superliga with Akademisk Boldklub, FC Midtjylland, and Lyngby BK, and has also played for Lyn Oslo in Norway. He ended his career in August 2008.
