= Jesper Mikkelsen =

Danish footballer (born 1980)

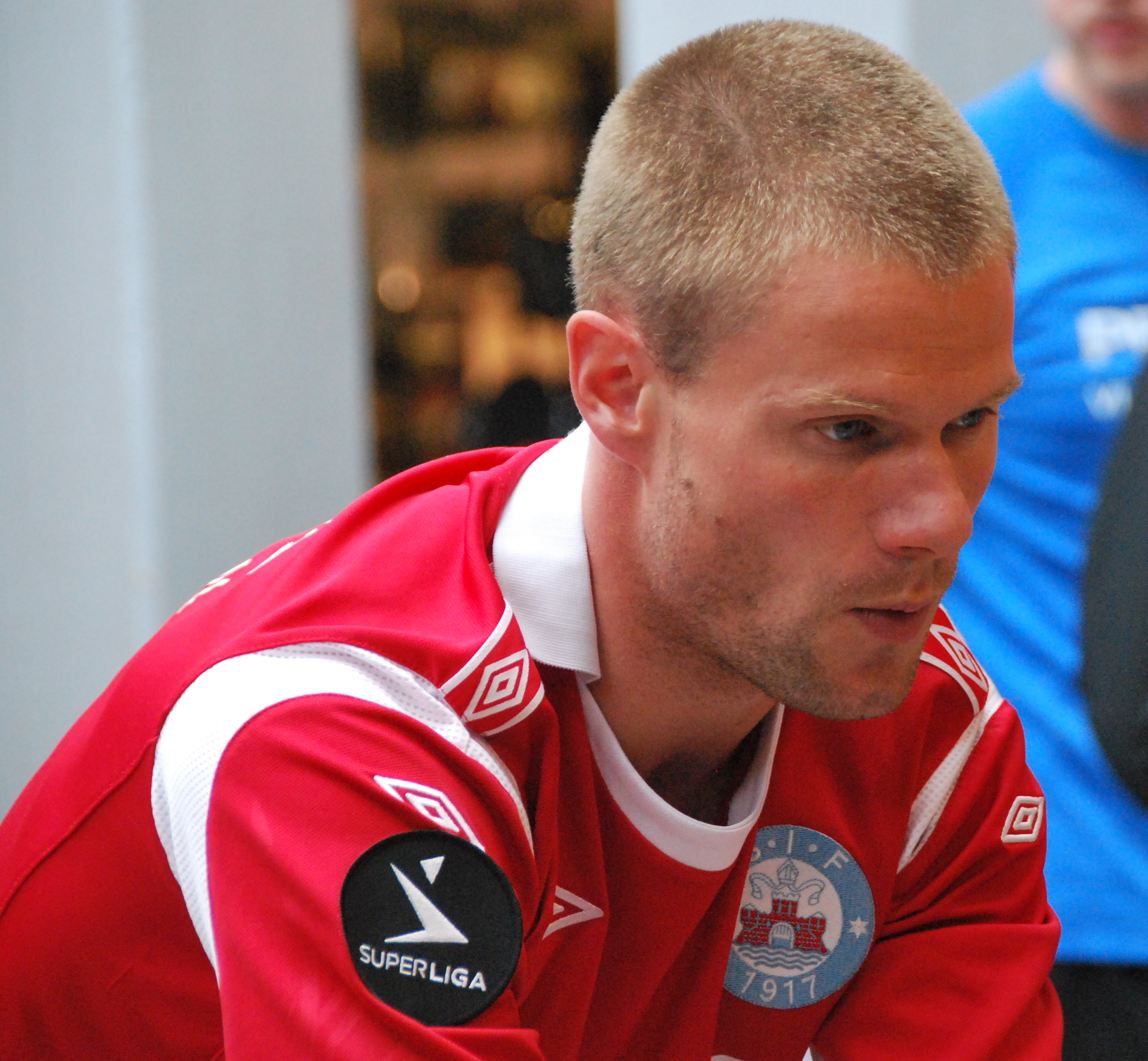

Personal information
- Date of birth: 26 July 1980 (age 46)
- Place of birth: Hillerød, Denmark
- Height: 1.81 m (5 ft 11 1/2 in)
- Position: Left back

Team information
- Current team: Silkeborg IF (youth coach)

Youth career
- Skive IK
- Holstebro BK
- Ikast FS

Senior career*
Years	Team	Apps	(Gls)
2000–2007	FC Midtjylland	227	(22)
2007	Esbjerg fB	15	(2)
2008–2010	Troyes	28	(0)
2010–2015	Silkeborg IF	103	(5)
Total		373	(29)

Managerial career
- 2015–: Silkeborg IF (youth)
- * Club domestic league appearances and goals

Jesper Mikkelsen (born 26 July 1980) is a Danish former footballer who played as a left back for Danish Superliga side Silkeborg IF.

Mikkelsen made his breakthrough with Danish Superliga side FC Midtjylland, playing 179 games for the club from 2000 to 2007. He played six months with Superliga rivals Esbjerg fB, before moving abroad to join French club Troyes AC. In May 2010, he signed a two-year deal with Superliga club Silkeborg IF.
