= Mikkel Thygesen =

Danish footballer (born 1984)

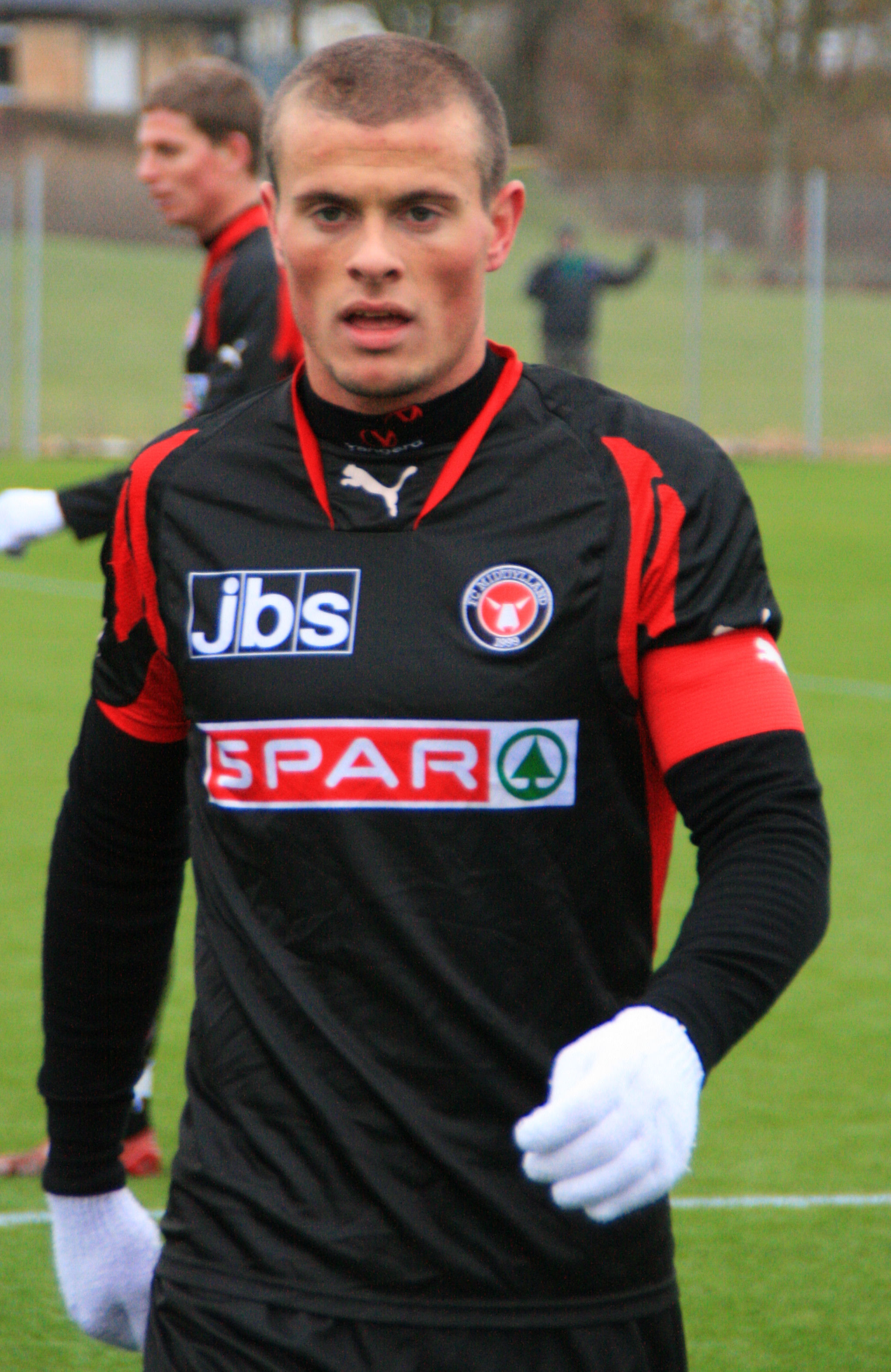
- Thygesen with FC Midtjylland in 2009

Personal information
- Date of birth: 22 October 1984 (age 42)
- Place of birth: Copenhagen, Denmark
- Height: 1.84 m (6 ft 0 in)
- Position: Midfielder

Team information
- Current team: Nykøbing (Manager)

Youth career
- Greve Fodbold
- Brøndby
- Frem

Senior career*
| Years | Team | Apps | (Gls) |
| 2002–2004 | Frem | 45 | (5) |
| 2004–2007 | Midtjylland | 77 | (11) |
| 2007 | Borussia Mönchengladbach | 5 | (0) |
| 2007–2011 | Midtjylland | 116 | (23) |
| 2011–2015 | Brøndby | 90 | (9) |
| 2015 | Hobro | 9 | (1) |
| 2015 | Randers | 1 | (0) |
| 2015–2019 | Roskilde | 111 | (16) |

International career
| 2004 | Denmark U-20 | 4 | (1) |
| 2004–2006 | Denmark U-21 | 12 | (2) |
| 2006–2008 | Denmark | 3 | (0) |

Managerial career
- 2019–2023: Helsingør (assistant)
- 2023–2024: Roskilde
- 2025–: Nykøbing
- * Club domestic league appearances and goals

Mikkel Thygesen (born 22 October 1984) is a Danish football coach and former player, currently in charge of Danish 2nd Division side Nykøbing FC.

Thygesen was capped three times for the Denmark national team, all friendlies.

== Club career ==
=== Early career ===
Born in Copenhagen, Thygesen started playing youth football for Greve Fodbold and later Brøndby IF, before getting his senior debut with Danish 1st Division (second tier) club BK Frem in the 2002–03 season. He helped Frem win promotion to the Danish Superliga in his second season, and was a part of Frem's starting line-up in the top-flight Danish championship. He played 30 out of 33 possible matches and scored five goals, which saw Frem relegated at the end of the season.

=== Midtjylland ===
Thygesen decided to stay in the Superliga, signing for FC Midtjylland in the summer of 2004. Here, he quickly established himself in the starting line-up.

Originally bought as a winger by Midtjylland, Thygesen made his breakthrough as a central midfielder, when he scored seven goals for the club in the first half of the 2006–07 season.

=== Borussia Mönchengladbach ===
On 9 January 2007, he was signed by Borussia Mönchengladbach in the German Bundesliga. Rumours had initially sent him to Alemannia Aachen, but they were unwilling to pay the transfer fee demanded by Midtjylland. He joined Mönchengladbach at their January training camp, which meant he had to drop the league national team tour. On 27 January 2007, he made his Bundesliga debut against Energie Cottbus, which Mönchengladbach lost 1–3. He made two appearances under head coach Jupp Heynckes, before the latter was fired, which meant that Thygesen had a hard time finding his way into the first team. Thygesen had failed to break into the team under new coach Jos Luhukay, playing only three of the remaining 15 league games.

Borussia Mönchengladbach were relegated from the Bundesliga at the end of the season, and Thygesen looked to leave the club in the summer 2007. He returned to FC Midtjylland on 1 July 2007, looking to strengthen his former club before their 2007-08 UEFA Cup campaign.

=== Brøndby ===
On 1 June 2011, he signed a three-year deal with Brøndby IF.

== International career ==
Thygesen made his debut for the Danish under-21 national team in November 2004, when he replaced Sebastian Svärd in the second half of the 2006 European Under-21 Championship qualification match against the Georgia under-21s. He scored a goal in the game, which the Denmark under-21s won 4–2. In May 2006, he was selected for the Danish squad at the 2006 European Under-21 Championship main tournament.

On 15 November 2006, he got his debut for the senior Danish national team under national team manager Morten Olsen. Thygesen came on as a substitute for Christian Poulsen in the second half of a friendly match against the Czech Republic. Five days later, he was called up for the league national team, for the trip to the United States, El Salvador and Honduras in January 2007.

== Coaching career ==
After four years at FC Roskilde, it was announced on 8 July 2019 that he had left the club. Two weeks later he announced, that he had retired and would continue at FC Helsingør as an assistant manager. Thygesen left the position in February 2023.

On 4 September 2023, he was announced as new manager of FC Roskilde succeeding Jesper Håkansson. He guided the club to promotion to the Danish 1st Division, but on 10 October 2024, he resigned as manager of the club.

On January 6, 2025, Thygesen was presented as the new manager of Danish 2nd Division side Nykøbing FC, where he signed a 2.5-year contract. In his first half season, his team finished last in the table and was thus relegated to the Danish 3rd Division.

== Honours ==
=== Manager ===
Nykøbing

- Danish 3rd Division: 2025–26

Sporting positions
| Preceded by (Denmark) Claus Madsen | F.C. Midtjylland captain 2009–2011 | Succeeded by (Denmark) Kristian Bak Nielsen |
| Preceded by (Denmark) Dennis Rommedahl | Brøndby IF captain 2013–2014 | Succeeded by (Denmark) Thomas Kahlenberg |
