= Ulrik Lindkvist =

Danish footballer (born 1981)

Personal information
- Date of birth: 5 March 1981 (age 45)
- Place of birth: Sunds, Denmark
- Height: 1.80 m (5 ft 11 in)
- Position: Defender

Youth career
- Sunds IF
- Ikast fS

Senior career*
| Years | Team | Apps | (Gls) |
| 2000–2007 | Midtjylland | 149 | (5) |
| 2007–2010 | AGF | 44 | (4) |
| 2010–2011 | Vejle | 15 | (0) |
| 2011 | Horsens | 2 | (0) |

International career
| 1998 | Denmark U19 | 1 | (0) |
| 2002 | Denmark U20 | 1 | (0) |
| 2002 | Denmark U21 | 1 | (0) |
- * Club domestic league appearances and goals as of 10 October 2012

Ulrik Lindkvist (born 5 March 1981), is a Danish retired professional football (soccer) player, who played as a defender. He played three games for various Danish youth national team selections.

Lindkvist played for FC Midtjylland (FCM), and he is a product of the youth work in the club. He mostly plays the position of left back, although he can play almost every position on the field. He prefers to play in the right side, in more attacking positions of the field.

In July 2010 he made a transfer to Vejle in the Danish First Division.
