= 2006 Danish Cup final =

- Event: 2005–06 Danish Cup
Esbjerg	Randers
0	1
- Date: 11 May 2006
- Venue: Parken, Copenhagen
- Man of the Match: Carsten Fredgaard (Randers)
- Referee: Kim Milton Nielsen
- Attendance: 23,825

The 2006 Danish Cup final was the final and deciding match of the 2005–06 Danish Cup. It took place on Thursday 11 May 2006 at Parken Stadium in Copenhagen and saw the 1st Division leaders Randers FC beat Superliga club Esbjerg fB after extra time.

Randers have won the Cup on three previous occasions (1967, 1968 and 1973). As well as 1976, Esbjerg also won the Cup in 1964.

In the Superliga in 2005-06, Esbjerg finished sixth and in Viasat Sport Division is Randers currently leading.

Referee Kim Milton Nielsen officiated the match.

== Road to Copenhagen ==
Esbjerg			Randers FC	
		Third round	Sædding/Guldager IF [JS] A 13–0	Johansen 7, 70; Larsen 20; Rask 24, 27, 42, 51; Pedersen 26, 37; Sandberg 32, 60; Fabinho 80, 88
		Fourth round	AGF [SL] H 2–0	Sandberg 45; Hansen 66
Lyngby BK [1D] A 5–4p	-	Fifth round	AC Horsens [SL] H 2–0	Fabinho 15; Lundberg 87
B 1909 [2D] A 3–1	Berglund 1, 75; Klarström 54	Quarter finals	BK Frem [1D] H 3–0	Fabinho 50 da Silva 80; Johansen 85
Brøndby IF [SL] H 5–2	Zimling 11; Lucena 31; Hansen 33 (p); Berglund 80, 90	Semi finals First leg	AaB [SL] H 0–0	-
Brøndby IF [SL] A 0–1	-	Second leg	AaB [SL] A 1–1	Jakobsen 73 (og)

- Randers started in third round.
- Esbjerg started in fifth round.
- Square brackets [ ] represent the opposition's division.

== Match facts ==
11 May 2006
19:00 CEST

Esbjerg fB	0–1 (a.e.t.)	Randers FC
		Johansen 116'

Parken Stadium, Copenhagen
Attendance: 23,825
Referee: Kim Milton Nielsen

ESBJERG FB
GK	16	(Denmark) Lars Winde (C)
RB	2	(Denmark) Frank Hansen
CB	3	(Denmark) Anders Møller Christensen	(substituted off) 87'
CB	17	(Denmark) Lars Christian Nielsen
LB	13	(Denmark) Martin Jensen
RM	25	(France) Michaël Murcy	(substituted off) 68'
CM	6	(Denmark) Niki Zimling
CM	21	(Denmark) Jerry Lucena
LM	5	(Denmark) Anders Nøhr	(substituted off) 81'
FW	9	(The Gambia) Njogu Demba-Nyrén
FW	11	(Sweden) Fredrik Berglund
Substitutes:
GK	1	(Denmark) Jan Hoffmann
DF	4	(Germany) Kolja Afriyie	(substituted on) 87'
FW	8	(Denmark) Lasse Kryger	(substituted on) 81'
MF	15	(Sweden) Andreas Klarström	(substituted on) 68'
Manager:
(Denmark) Troels Bech

RANDERS FC
GK	1	(Denmark) Martin S. Jensen
RB	8	(Denmark) Søren Pedersen
CB	3	(Denmark) Ralf Pedersen(C)
CB	5	(Denmark) John Sandberg
LB	12	(Denmark) Jonas Damborg
RM	7	(Brazil) Alex da Silva	(substituted off) 71'
CM	99	(Denmark) Stig Tøfting	(yellow card) 75'
CM	14	(Denmark) Kenneth Møller Pedersen
LM	16	(Denmark) Carsten Fredgaard	(substituted off) 110'
FW	10	(Denmark) Karsten Johansen	(yellow card) 101' (yellow-red card) 116'
FW	23	(Denmark) Lars Larsen	(substituted off) 77'
Substitutes:
GK	26	(Denmark) Mads Toppel
FW	9	(Denmark) Jesper Christiansen	(substituted on) 77'
DF	13	(Denmark) Søren Holdgaard	(substituted on) 110'
MF	15	(Denmark) Rasmus Hansen	(substituted on) 71'
Manager:
(Denmark) Lars Olsen

MATCH RULES

- 90 minutes.
- 2 x 15 minutes of extra-time if necessary.
- Penalty shootout if scores still level.
- Four named substitutes
- Maximum of 3 substitutions.
