= List of Danish football transfers summer 2008 =

This is a list of Danish football transfers for the 2008 summer transfer window. Only moves featuring at least one Danish Superliga club are listed.

The 2007–08 Danish Superliga season ended on May 24, 2008, with the 2008–09 Danish Superliga season starting on July 19, 2008. The summer transfer window opened on 1 July 2008, although a few transfers took place prior to that date; including carry-overs from the winter 2007–08 transfer window. The window closed at midnight on 31 August 2008. Players without a club may join one at any time, either during or in between transfer windows. If need be, clubs may sign a goalkeeper on an emergency loan, if all others are unavailable.

== Transfers ==
Date	Name	Nat	Moving from	Moving to	Fee
2008-01-22^{1}	Allan Olesen	DNK	AaB	Vejle Boldklub	Free
2008-02-01^{1}	Bechara Oliveira	BRA	OB	Vejle Boldklub	Free
2008-02-16^{1}	Simon Kjær	DNK	FC Midtjylland	(Italy) U.S. Città di Palermo	DKK 30,000,000
2008-03-04	Igors Stepanovs	LAT	Esbjerg fB	(Russia) FC Shinnik Yaroslavl	Undisclosed
2008-03-12	Theis F. Rasmussen	DNK	BK Frem	FC Nordsjælland	Free
2008-03-13	Kim Christensen	DNK	FC Nordsjælland	(Sweden) IFK Göteborg	Undisclosed
2008-03-23	Jan Tore Ophaug	NOR	OB	(Norway) Fredrikstad FK	Undisclosed
2008-03-26	José Mota	BRA	AaB	(Norway) Molde FK	Loan
2008-04-01	Dan Anton Johansen	DNK	Unattached	Viborg FF	Free
2008-03-27	David Nielsen	DNK	OB	(Norway) Strømsgodset IF	Loan
2008-04-02^{1}	Marcus Allbäck	SWE	F.C. Copenhagen	(Sweden) Örgryte IS	Free
2008-04-19^{1}	Danny Califf	USA	AaB	FC Midtjylland	Free
2008-04-20^{1}	Fabinho	BRA	Randers FC	Herfølge Boldklub	Free
2008-04-21^{1}	Martin Mikkelsen	DNK	AGF	FC Fredericia	Free
2008-04-25	Peguero Jean Philippe	HTI	Brøndby IF	(United States) MLS (San Jose)	Loan
2008-05-03	Jimmy Høyer	DNK	AGF	(Iceland) Knattspyrnufélagið Víkingur	Undisclosed
2008-05-08	Ivo Vazgec	SWE	Unattached	AaB	Free
2008-05-12	Rasmus Hansen	DEN	Randers FC	(Faroe Islands) Valur	Released
2008-05-13^{1}	Anders Syberg	DNK	AGF	FC Sjælland	Free
2008-05-14^{1}	Filip Marčić	CRO	(Croatia) NK Rijeka	FC Midtjylland	DKK 3,000,000
2008-05-15^{1}	Oluwafemi Ajilore	NGA	FC Midtjylland	(Netherlands) FC Groningen	DKK 24,600,000
2008-05-15^{1}	Andreas Schultz	DNK	AGF	FC Sjælland	Free
2008-05-20^{1}	Allan Arenfeldt Olesen	DNK	FC Nordsjælland	Randers FC	Free
2008-05-21^{1}	Simon Nagel	DNK	Viborg FF	AC Horsens	Free
2008-05-22^{1}	Dennis Cagara	DNK	(Germany) Hertha BSC Berlin	FC Nordsjælland	Free
2008-05-23^{1}	Søren Ulrik Vestergaard	DNK	Randers FC	Viborg FF	Undisclosed
2008-05-26^{1}	Michael Silberbauer	DNK	F.C. Copenhagen	(Netherlands) FC Utrecht	Free
2008-05-27^{1}	Nabil Aslam	DNK	BK Frem	AC Horsens	Free
2008-05-30^{1}	Brian Priske	DNK	(Belgium) Club Brugge K.V.	Vejle Boldklub	Undisclosed
2008-06-04^{2}	Espen Ruud	NOR	(Norway) Odd Grenland	OB	Exchange
2008-06-04^{2}	Søren Jensen	DNK	OB	(Norway) Odd Grenland	Exchange
2008-06-04^{1}	Emil Lyng	DNK	AGF	(France) Lille OSC	DKK 3,725,000
2008-06-04	Björn Runström	SWE	Unattached	OB	Free
2008-06-04^{1}	Rajko Lekic	DEN	Esbjerg fB	Silkeborg IF	Loan
2008-06-05^{1}	Nando Rafael	ANG	(Germany) Borussia Mönchengladbach	AGF	DKK 3,500,000
2008-06-06^{1}	Thomas Hansen	DNK	AGF	Silkeborg IF	Undisclosed
2008-06-06^{1}	Nick Ragus	DNK	FC Midtjylland	Viborg FF	Undisclosed
2008-06-11^{1}	Kenneth Sørensen	DNK	AC Horsens	Herfølge Boldklub	Undisclosed
2008-06-11^{1}	Martin Thomsen	DEN	SønderjyskE	Kolding FC	Free
2008-06-12^{1}	Ulrik Balling	DNK	Vejle Boldklub	Næstved BK	Undisclosed
2008-06-13^{1}	Sölvi Ottesen	ISL	(Sweden) Djurgårdens IF	SønderjyskE	DKK 750,000
2008-06-13^{1}	Michaël Murcy	FRA	Esbjerg fB	(France) Clermont Foot	Free
2008-06-16^{1}	Morten Rasmussen	DNK	Brøndby IF	AC Horsens	Undisclosed
2008-06-16^{1}	Gunnar Thorvaldsson	ISL	(Germany) Hannover 96	Esbjerg fB	DKK 1,000,000
2008-06-16^{1}	Lars Christian Nielsen	DNK	Esbjerg fB	Kolding FC	Undisclosed
2008-06-16^{1}	Jeppe Brandrup	DNK	Randers FC	Silkeborg IF	Loan
2008-06-16^{1}	Timmi Johansen	DNK	(Netherlands) SC Heerenveen	OB	Loan
2008-06-17^{1}	Michael Beauchamp	AUS	(Germany) 1. FC Nürnberg	AaB	DKK 1,100,000
2008-06-18^{1}	Kasper Klausen	DNK	AC Horsens	Hvidovre IF	Free
2008-06-19^{1}	Hélder Cabral	POR	(Portugal) C.F. Estrela da Amadora	Vejle Boldklub	Undisclosed
2008-06-20^{1}	Kasper Bøgelund	DNK	(Germany) Borussia Mönchengladbach	AaB	Free
2008-06-20^{1}	Georges N'Doum	CMR	(Germany) MSV Duisburg	AC Horsens	Free
2008-06-21	John Mosquera	COL	(Germany) Werder Bremen	SønderjyskE	Loan
2008-06-23^{1}	Jonas Borring	DNK	OB	FC Midtjylland	DKK 19,000,000
2008-06-23	Kim Christensen	DNK	(England) Barnsley F.C.	FC Midtjylland	Free
2008-06-23^{2}	Dan Thomassen	DNK	(Norway) Vålerenga I.F.	AGF	DKK 5,000,000
2008-06-24^{1}	Christian Olsen	DNK	FC Midtjylland	Viborg FF	Undisclosed
2008-06-25^{1}	Patrice Bernier	CAN	(Germany) 1. FC Kaiserslautern	FC Nordsjælland	Free
2008-06-25^{1}	Edin Cakovic	SWE	(Sweden) IFK Malmö	Vejle Boldklub	Undisclosed
2008-06-26^{1}	Jon Jönsson	SWE	(France) Toulouse FC	Brøndby IF	DKK 3,700,000
2008-06-26^{1}	Anders Rasmussen	DNK	FC Midtjylland	Viborg FF	Free
2008-06-26^{1}	Martin Fribrock	SWE	(Sweden) Halmstads BK	Esbjerg fB	DKK 4,000,000
2008-06-27^{1}	Marc Olsen	DEN	SønderjyskE	Hvidovre IF	Free
2008-06-29^{1}	Adrian Cann	CAN	(Canada) Vancouver Whitecaps	Esbjerg fB	Undisclosed
2008-06-30^{1}	Ricki Olsen	DNK	Brøndby IF	Randers FC	Undisclosed
2008-07-01	Adam Eckersley	ENG	(England) Port Vale F.C.	AC Horsens	Free
2008-07-01	Lars Jensen	DEN	AC Horsens	Retirement	End of contract
2008-07-01	Ibrahim Babatunde	DEN	AC Horsens	Unattached	Out of contract
2008-07-01	Mads Jørgensen	DEN	AGF	Retirement	End of contract
2008-07-01	Peter Foldgast	DEN	AGF	(Faroe Islands) EB/Streymur	Free
2008-07-01	Trond Andersen	NOR	Brøndby IF	Retirement	End of contract
2008-07-01	Per Nielsen	DEN	Brøndby IF	Retirement	End of contract
2008-07-01	Lasse Qvist	DEN	F.C. Copenhagen	Unattached	End of contract
2008-07-01	Jesper Juelsgaard	DEN	Skive IK	FC Midtjylland	Loan return
2008-07-01	Christian Sivebæk	DEN	Skive IK	FC Midtjylland	Loan return
2008-07-01	Emmanuel Ake	NGR	FC Nordsjælland	Herfølge Boldklub	Free
2008-07-01	Mustapha Papa Diop	SEN	OB	Unattached	End of contract
2008-07-01	Andreas Sørensen	DEN	Vejle Boldklub	AB	Free
2008-07-01	Kim Kristensen	DEN	Vejle Boldklub	Unattached	End of contract
2008-07-01	Lars Nilsson	SWE	AaB	(France) Saint-Etienne	Loan return
2008-07-01	Ivo Vazgec	SWE	AaB	Unattached	End of contract
2008-07-03	Jón Rói Jacobsen	FRO	AaB	BK Frem	Undisclosed
2008-07-04	Søren Krogh	DNK	FC Nordsjælland	BK Frem	Free
2008-07-06	Michael Gravgaard	DNK	F.C. Copenhagen	(France) FC Nantes	DKK 29,000,000
2008-07-07	Kristijan Ipša	CRO	(Germany) FC Energie Cottbus	FC Midtjylland	Undisclosed
2008-07-07	Kenni Olsen	DNK	FC Nordsjælland	AB	Loan
2008-07-08	Morten Bertolt	DNK	F.C. Copenhagen	SønderjyskE	DKK 1,000,000
2008-07-08	Anders Østli	NOR	BK Skjold	SønderjyskE	Free
2008-07-08	Alexander Farnerud	SWE	(Germany) VfB Stuttgart	Brøndby IF	DKK 6,000,000
2008-07-08	Martin Retov	DNK	Brøndby IF	(Germany) FC Hansa Rostock	DKK 7,500,000
2008-07-08	Anders Qvist	DNK	FC Nordsjælland	FC Amager	Free
2008-07-08^{3}	Benjamin Kibebe	SWE	(Norway) Aalesunds FK	FC Nordsjælland	Free
2008-07-11	Magnus Troest	DNK	FC Midtjylland	(Italy) Parma F.C.	DKK 3,700,000
2008-07-11	Tiago Targino	POR	(Portugal) Vitória S.C.	Randers FC	Loan
2008-07-14	Henrik Hansen	DNK	AC Horsens	OB	Undisclosed
2008-07-14	Henrik Bødker	DNK	FC Nordsjælland	SønderjyskE	Undisclosed
2008-07-14	Dalil Benyahia	SWE	(Sweden) IF Brommapojkarna	Vejle Boldklub	Undisclosed
2008-07-15	Thomas Kristensen	DNK	FC Nordsjælland	F.C. Copenhagen	Undisclosed
2008-07-15	Per Gade	DEN	AC Horsens	Unattached	Released
2008-07-16	Jan Kristiansen	DNK	(Germany) 1. FC Nürnberg	Brøndby IF	Free
2008-07-16	Eric Djemba-Djemba	CMR	Qatar SC	OB	Free
2008-07-17	Mike Jensen	DNK	Brøndby IF	(Sweden) Malmö FF	Loan
2008-07-18^{4}	César Santin	BRA	(Sweden) Kalmar FF	F.C. Copenhagen	DKK 15,000,000
2008-07-18	Jimmy Mayasi	DNK	Silkeborg IF	AC Horsens	Undisclosed
2008-07-18	Benedict Vilakazi	RSA	AaB	(South Africa) Mamelodi Sundowns FC	Undisclosed
2008-07-20	David Addy	GHA	(Ghana) International Allies	Randers FC	Undisclosed
2008-07-22	Adeola Lanre Runsewe	NGA	FC Midtjylland	Skive IK	Loan
2008-07-22	Ayinde Jamiu Lawal	NGA	FC Midtjylland	Skive IK	Loan
2008-07-25	Peter Larsson	SWE	(Sweden) Halmstads BK	F.C. Copenhagen	DKK 15,000,000
2008-07-25	Martin Spelmann	DNK	Brøndby IF	AC Horsens	Undisclosed
2008-07-25^{6}	Alex Valencia	NOR	AGF	(Norway) Odd Grenland	Undisclosed
2008-07-28	Casper Grønn Larsen	DNK	SønderjyskE	BK Frem	Loan
2008-08-01	Martin Borre	DNK	(Norway) IK Start	Vejle Boldklub	Undisclosed
2008-08-01	Emmanuel Clottey	GHA	(Ghana) Great Olympics	OB	Loan
2008-08-01	Wassim El Banna	DNK	Unattached	Vejle Boldklub	Free
2008-08-01	Peguero Jean Philippe	HTI	(United States) MLS (San Jose)	Brøndby IF	Loan return
2008-08-01	Fernando Derveld	NLD	Esbjerg fB	Unattached	Released
2008-08-04	Chris Katongo	ZAM	Brøndby IF	(Germany) Arminia Bielefeld	Undisclosed
2008-08-05	Allan Nielsen	DNK	Unattached	AC Horsens	Free
2008-08-05	Gustavo Adolfo Cabrera	GUA	(Guatemala) Comunicaciones	AGF	Undisclosed
2008-08-05	Srdjan Radonjic	MNE	OB	(Norway) IK Start	Loan
2008-08-07	Marek Saganowski	POL	(England) Southampton	AaB	Loan
2008-08-07	Will John	USA	Randers FC	(Serbia) FC Cukaricki	Free
2008-08-08	David Preece	ENG	Silkeborg IF	OB	Free
2008-08-14	Jakob Poulsen	DNK	(Netherlands) SC Heerenveen	AGF	Undisclosed
2008-08-15	Mads Timm	DEN	OB	Unattached	Released
2008-08-18	Benny Feilhaber	USA	(England) Derby County	AGF	Undisclosed
2008-08-25	Alexander Östlund	SWE	Unattached	Esbjerg fB	Free
2008-08-25	Steffen Algreen	DNK	AC Horsens	FC Fyn	Free
2008-08-25	Thomas Rytter	DEN	Brøndby IF	Retirement	Released
2008-08-30	Michael Krohn-Dehli	DNK	(Netherlands) AFC Ajax	Brøndby IF	Undisclosed
2008-08-30	Peter Utaka	NGA	(Belgium) Royal Antwerp FC	OB	Undisclosed
2008-08-31	Mikkel Beckmann	DNK	Lyngby Boldklub	Randers FC	Undisclosed
2008-08-31	Ousman Jallow	GAM	(United Arab Emirates) Al Ain FC	Brøndby IF	Undisclosed
2008-08-31	Andrei Sidorenkov	EST	(Estonia) FC Flora Tallinn	SønderjyskE	Undisclosed
2008-08-31	Davit Devdariani	GEO	(Georgia (country)) FC Olimpi Rustavi	AGF	Undisclosed
2008-08-31	Matti Lund Nielsen	DNK	OB	Lyngby Boldklub	Loan
2008-08-31	Anders Lindegaard	DNK	OB	Kolding FC	Loan
2008-08-31	Anders K. Jacobsen	DNK	OB	Vejle Boldklub	Loan
2008-08-31	Ralf Pedersen	DNK	Randers FC	Viborg FF	Undisclosed
2008-08-31	Steven Pressley	SCO	Unattached	Randers FC	Free
2008-08-31	Maros Klimpl	SVK	FC Midtjylland	(Scotland) Motherwell	Loan

== Notes ==
- ^1 Player will officially join his new club on 1 July 2008.
- ^2 Player will officially join his new club on 7 July 2008.
- ^3 Player will officially join his new club on 23 July 2008.
- ^4 Player will officially join his new club on 24 July 2008.
- ^5 Player will officially join his new club on 1 August 2008.
