= List of Danish football transfers winter 2008–09 =

This is a list of Danish football transfers for the 2008-09 winter transfer window. Only moves featuring at least one Danish Superliga club are listed.

The 2008-09 Danish Superliga had its winter break between 8 December 2008 and 28 February 2009. The winter transfer window opened on 1 January 2009, although a few transfers took place prior to that date; although a carry-over from the summer 2008 transfer window. The window closed at midnight on 2 February 2009. Players without a club may join one at any time, either during or in between transfer windows. If need be, clubs may sign a goalkeeper on an emergency loan, if all others are unavailable.

== Transfers ==
Date	Name	Nat	Moving from	Moving to	Fee
2008-06-22^{1}	Bobbie Friberg da Cruz	SWE	(Sweden) GAIS	Randers FC	Undisclosed
2008-07-07^{1}	Arthur Sorin	FRA	(Sweden) Kalmar FF	AGF	Free
2008-07-19^{1}	Niki Zimling	DNK	Esbjerg fB	(Italy) Udinese Calcio	Free
2008-07-28^{1}	Johan Wiland	SWE	(Sweden) IF Elfsborg	F.C. Copenhagen	DKK 8,000,000
2008-09-01^{1}	José Mota	BRA	AaB	(Norway) Molde FK	Undisclosed
2008-10-15^{1}	Nicolai Stokholm	DNK	(Norway) Viking FK	FC Nordsjælland	Undisclosed
2008-11-06^{1}	Cristian Bolaños	CRI	Odense Boldklub	(Norway) IK Start	DKK 3,000,000
2008-11-14	Peguero Jean Philippe	HAI	Brøndby IF	Retirement	Released
2008-11-15	Anders Jacobsen	DEN	Vejle Boldklub	Odense Boldklub	Loan terminated
2008-11-21^{1}	Adda Djeziri	DNK	FC Hjørring	Vejle Boldklub	Undisclosed
2008-11-28	Bechara Oliveira	BRA	Vejle Boldklub	Unattached	Released
2008-12-01^{1}	Martin Ericsson	SWE	Brøndby IF	(Sweden) IF Elfsborg	DKK 2,850,000
2008-12-02^{1}	Magne Sturød	NOR	AC Horsens	(Norway) Kongsvinger IL	Undisclosed
2008-12-09^{1}	Michael Parkhurst	USA	(United States) MLS (New England)	FC Nordsjælland	Free
2008-12-10^{1}	Mark Howard	ENG	Brøndby IF	AGF	Undisclosed
2008-12-10^{1}	Andreas Augustsson	SWE	(Sweden) IF Elfsborg	AC Horsens	Undisclosed
2008-12-12^{1}	Jones Kusi-Asare	SWE	(Sweden) Djurgårdens IF Fotboll	Esbjerg fB	Free
2008-12-16	Theis Rasmussen	DEN	FC Nordsjælland	Unattached	Released
2008-12-20	Georges Ndoum	CMR	AC Horsens	Unattached	Released
2008-12-21^{1}	Henrik Dalsgaard	DEN	Møldrup/Tostrup IF	AaB	Undisclosed
2008-12-22^{1}	Martin Vingaard	DNK	Esbjerg fB	F.C. Copenhagen	DKK 7,000,000
2008-12-23^{1}	Rajko Lekic	DNK	Esbjerg fB	Silkeborg IF	Undisclosed
2008-12-23^{1}	Mikael Rynell	SWE	Herfølge Boldklub	Esbjerg fB	Undisclosed
2008-12-28^{1}	Simon Bræmer	DEN	AaB	AB	Free
2009-01-01	Maroš Klimpl	SVK	FC Midtjylland	(Scotland) Motherwell	Loan
2009-01-01	Joseph Elanga	CMR	AC Horsens	Brøndby IF	Loan return
2009-01-01	Morten Hyldgaard	DEN	AGF	Unattached	End of contract
2009-01-01	Gustavo Cabrera	GUA	AGF	Unattached	End of contract
2009-01-01	Mike Jensen	DEN	(Sweden) Malmö FF	Brøndby IF	Loan return
2009-01-01	Kim Daugaard	DEN	Brøndby IF	Retirement	End of contract
2009-01-01	Nikolaj Hansen	DEN	F.C. Copenhagen	Unattached	End of contract
2009-01-01	Christian Pihl Pedersen	DEN	FC Nordsjælland	Unattached	Released
2009-01-01	Emmanuel Clottey	GHA	Odense Boldklub	(Ghana) Accra Olympics	Loan return
2009-01-01	Steven Pressley	SCO	Randers FC	Unattached	Out of contract
2009-01-01	Lars Larsen	DEN	Randers FC	Unattached	Out of contract
2009-01-01	Søren Holdgaard	DEN	Randers FC	Unattached	Out of contract
2009-01-01	Thomas Røll	DEN	Vejle Boldklub	FC Midtjylland	Loan return
2009-01-01	Danilo Arrieta	DEN	Vejle Boldklub	Unattached	Out of contract
2009-01-01	Wassim El Banna	DEN	Vejle Boldklub	Unattached	Out of contract
2009-01-01	Marek Saganowski	POL	AaB	(England) Southampton	Loan return
2009-01-05	Nicklas Pedersen	DNK	FC Nordsjælland	(Netherlands) FC Groningen	DKK 16,300,000
2009-01-07	Nenad Novaković	SRB	(Italy) Reggina Calcio	FC Nordsjælland	Undisclosed
2009-01-07	Cheikh Sarr	DEN	AGF	Unattached	Released
2009-01-08	Besart Berisha	ALB	(England) Burnley	AC Horsens	Loan
2009-01-08	Kjetil Wæhler	NOR	(Norway) Vålerenga IF Fotball	AaB	Undisclosed
2009-01-09	Lukas Hradecky	FIN	Unattached	Esbjerg fB	Free
2009-01-10	Dennis Flinta	DNK	FC Midtjylland	Silkeborg IF	Undisclosed
2009-01-12	Victor Pálsson	ISL	AGF	(England) Liverpool	Undisclosed
2009-01-12	Andreas Laudrup	DNK	Lyngby Boldklub	FC Nordsjælland	Free
2009-01-12	Serghei Dadu	MDA	FC Midtjylland	(Russia) Alania Vladikavkaz	Undisclosed
2009-01-12	Dame N'Doye	SEN	(Greece) OFI	F.C. Copenhagen	DKK 15,000,000
2009-01-14	Mads Laudrup	DNK	F.C. Copenhagen	Herfølge BK	Undisclosed
2009-01-14	Ayinde Jamiu Lawal	NGA	FC Midtjylland	Skive IK	Loan
2009-01-14	Adeola Lanre Runsewe	NGA	FC Midtjylland	Skive IK	Loan
2009-01-14	Hélder Cabral	POR	Vejle Boldklub	Unattached	Released
2009-01-15	Lee Nguyen	USA	Randers FC	(Vietnam) Hoàng Anh Gia Lai	Free
2009-01-15	Marcus Tracy	USA	(United States) Wake Forest University	AaB	Free
2009-01-15	Baba Collins	NGA	FC Midtjylland	Vejle Boldklub	Loan
2009-01-15	Petter Furuseth Olsen	NOR	FC Midtjylland	(Norway) FC Lyn	Undisclosed
2009-01-15	Allan Gaarde	DNK	(Norway) Viking FK	Vejle Boldklub	Undisclosed
2009-01-16	Adeshina Lawal	NGA	Vejle Boldklub	Lyngby Boldklub	Loan
2009-01-19	Michael Præst	DNK	Vejle Boldklub	Kolding FC	Loan
2009-01-21	Kári Árnason	ISL	AGF	Esbjerg fB	Loan
2009-01-22	Marcus Pode	SWE	FC Nordsjælland	(Sweden) Trelleborgs FF	Undisclosed
2009-01-23	Martin Pedersen	DNK	AaB	Vejle Boldklub	Undisclosed
2009-01-23	Tally Hall	USA	Esbjerg fB	(United States) MLS (Houston Dynamo)	Undisclosed
2009-01-24	Dalil Benyahia	SWE	Vejle Boldklub	(Sweden) IF Brommapojkarna	Undisclosed
2009-01-26	Njogu Demba-Nyrén	GAM	(Norway) SK Brann	Odense Boldklub	Undisclosed
2009-01-26	David Nielsen	DNK	Odense Boldklub	(Norway) SK Brann	Undisclosed
2009-01-26	Anders Rasmussen	DNK	Viborg FF	AGF	Undisclosed
2009-01-28	Tobias Grahn	SWE	Unattached	Randers FC	Free
2009-01-28	Luton Shelton	JAM	(Norway) Vålerenga IF Fotball	AaB	Loan
2009-01-31	Anders Lindegaard	DNK	Odense Boldklub	(Norway) Aalesunds FK	Loan
2009-01-31	Samel Šabanović	MNE	(Switzerland) Grasshopper Club Zürich	Esbjerg fB	Loan
2009-02-02	Thomas Røll	DNK	FC Midtjylland	Viborg FF	Undisclosed
2009-02-02	Rasmus Würtz	DNK	F.C. Copenhagen	Vejle Boldklub	Loan
2009-02-02	Ibrahim Salou	GHA	(Germany) MSV Duisburg	Vejle Boldklub	Undisclosed
2009-02-02	Srđan Radonjić	MNE	Odense Boldklub	(Austria) SCR Altach	Loan
2009-02-02	Remco van der Schaaf	NED	(England) Burnley	Brøndby IF	Loan
2009-02-02	Kristian Lassen	DNK	IK Skovbakken	AGF	Free
2009-02-02	Matti Lund Nielsen	DNK	Odense Boldklub	Lyngby Boldklub	Loan
2009-02-02	Jacob Stolberg	DNK	SønderjyskE	FC Sydvest 05	Free
2009-02-02	Júnior	BRA	F.C. Copenhagen	FC Nordsjælland	Loan
2009-02-02	Razak Salifu	GHA	AGF	Kolding FC	Loan
2009-02-16^{2}	Ibrahim Gnanou	BFA	FC Midtjylland	(Russia) Alania Vladikavkaz	Undisclosed
2009-03-04^{3}	Pablo Piñones-Arce	SWE	Vejle Boldklub	(Sweden) Brommapojkarna	Loan
2009-03-12^{4}	Kristian Flittie Onstad	NOR	Esbjerg	(Norway) Brann	Loan
2009-03-12^{2}	Baye Djiby Fall	SEN	Odense Boldklub	(Russia) Lokomotiv Moscow	DKK 35,000,000
2009-03-14^{3}	Nathan Coe	AUS	F.C. Copenhagen	(Sweden) Örgryte	Loan

== Notes ==
- ^1 The player officially joined his new club on 1 January 2009.
- ^2 The deal went through during the transfer window of the Russian Premier League.
- ^3 The deal went through during the transfer window of the Swedish Allsvenskan.
- ^4 The deal went through during the transfer window of the Norwegian Premier League.
