= 2008 Danish Cup final =

- Event: 2007–08 Danish Cup
Brøndby	Esbjerg
3	2
- Date: 1 May 2008
- Venue: Parken, Copenhagen
- Man of the Match: Samuel Holmén (Brøndby)
- Referee: Claus Bo Larsen
- Attendance: 33,154

The 2008 Danish Cup final was the final and deciding match of the 2007–08 Danish Cup. It took place on Thursday, 1 May 2008 at Parken Stadium in Copenhagen. Brøndby IF, the Superliga number 9 of the day, met the then number 8 Esbjerg fB.

Brøndby had won the Cup on five previous occasions (1989, 1994, 1998, 2003, and 2005), while Esbjerg took the trophy in 1964 and 1976, but lost the final in 2006 to Randers FC.

Referee Claus Bo Larsen officiated the match.

Brøndby defeated Esbjerg 3–2.

== Road to Copenhagen ==
Brøndby IF			Esbjerg fB	
Allerød FK [DS] A 4–1	Williams 6 Lorentzen 10; Madsen 45, 69	Second round	Vanløse IF [2D] A 2–0	Lekic 32; Demba-Nyrén 48
Silkeborg IF [1D] A 2–1	Retov 47; T. Rasmussen 88	Third round	Værløse BK [2D] A 4–1	Jørgensen 31 (pen.), 59 (pen.); Demba-Nyrén 68; Bech 74
OB [SL] A 1–0	Lorentzen 119	Fourth round	Herfølge BK [1D] A 1–0	Zimling 103
Randers FC [SL] H 2–1	Gislason 50; Duncan Rasmussen 58	Quarter finals	Skive IK [1D] A 4–0	Lange 13, 88; Bech 44; Murcy 60
FC Midtjylland [SL] H 3–0	Katongo 34, 73; Holmén 63	Semi finals First leg	F.C. Copenhagen [SL] A 1–0	Murcy 66
FC Midtjylland [SL] A 2–0	Katongo 10 von Schlebrügge 80	Second leg	F.C. Copenhagen [SL] H 2–2	Bech 104; Lange 119

- Both sides entered the competition in its second round.
- Square brackets [ ] represent the opposition's division.

== Match details ==
1 May 2008
15:00 CEST

Brøndby IF	3–2	Esbjerg fB
Holmén 15' von Schlebrügge 69'; Retov 85'		Rieks 62', 79'

Parken Stadium, Copenhagen
Attendance: 33,154
Referee: Claus Bo Larsen

Brøndby IF	Esbjerg fB

BRØNDBY IF
GK	16	(Denmark) Stephan Andersen
RB	32	(Denmark) Anders Randrup
CB	5	(England) Mark Howard
CB	18	(Sweden) Max von Schlebrügge
LB	21	(Denmark) Thomas Rasmussen (c)
DM	20	(Iceland) Stefán Gíslason
RM	6	(Sweden) Samuel Holmén
LM	7	(Denmark) Kasper Lorentzen	(substituted off) 73'
AM	9	(Denmark) Martin Retov
FW	10	(Sweden) Martin Ericsson
FW	28	(Zambia) Chris Katongo	(substituted off) 88'
Substitutes:
GK	30	(Denmark) Michael Tørnes
MF	8	(Denmark) Kim Daugaard	(substituted on) 88'
MF	25	(Denmark) Tobias Mikkelsen	(substituted on) 73'
DF	29	(Denmark) Daniel Wass
Manager:
(Denmark) Tom Køhlert

ESBJERG FB
GK	16	(Denmark) Lars Winde (c)
RB	2	(Denmark) Frank Hansen
CB	20	(Norway) Kristian Flittie Onstad
CB	21	(Sweden) Fredrik Björck
LB	15	(Sweden) Andreas Klarström
RM	31	(Denmark) Søren Rieks	(yellow card) 50'	(substituted off) 90'
CM	7	(Denmark) Jesper Jørgensen
CM	14	(Denmark) Martin Vingaard
LM	10	(Brazil) Thiago Pinto Borges		(substituted off) 46'
FW	11	(Denmark) Jesper Bech
FW	25	(France) Michaël Murcy		(substituted off) 46'
Substitutes:
GK	1	(United States) Tally Hall
DF	6	(Denmark) Niki Zimling		(substituted on) 46'
MF	13	(Denmark) Kevin Conboy		(substituted on) 90'
FW	22	(Denmark) Jesper Lange	(yellow card) 90+4'	(substituted on) 46'
Manager:
(Denmark) Troels Bech

Man of the Match (Pokalfighter):
Samuel Holmén (Brøndby IF)

Assistant referees:
Bill René Hansen
Ole V. Hansen
Fourth official:
Lars Christoffersen

Match rules:

- 90 minutes.
- 2 x 15 minutes of extra-time if necessary.
- Penalty shootout if scores still level.
- Four named substitutes
- Maximum of 3 substitutions.

== See also ==
- 2007–08 Danish Cup for details of the current competition
