= Lars Winde =

Danish footballer (born 1975)

Personal information
- Date of birth: 3 December 1975 (age 50)
- Place of birth: Aalborg, Denmark
- Height: 1.85 m (6 ft 1 in)
- Position: Goalkeeper

Youth career
- Gjøl BK
- AaB

Senior career*
Years	Team	Apps	(Gls)
1994–2000	AaB	38	(0)
2001–2002	SW Bregenz	47	(0)
2002	AaB	0	(0)
2003–2012	Esbjerg fB	290	(0)
Total		375	(0)

International career
1995	Denmark U19	2	(0)
1996–1997	Denmark U21	7	(0)

Managerial career
- 2012–2021: Esbjerg fB (goalkeeper coach)
- 2021-: AC Horsens (goalkeeper coach)
- * Club domestic league appearances and goals

Lars Winde (born 3 December 1975) is a Danish former professional footballer who played as a goalkeeper for Danish Superliga clubs Esbjerg fB and Aalborg BK (AaB) as well as Austrian Bundesliga side SW Bregenz. Winde played seven games for the Denmark U21 national team.

== Career ==
Lars Winde is the son of former 1960s Aalborg BK (AaB) goalkeeper Kurt Winde. As a child, he played football as an outfield player, but ultimately chose the goalkeeper position due to asthma. In January 1994, at the age of 18, Winde became the understudy of Norway international goalkeeper Thomas Gill. He signed a one-year professional contract with AaB in the Summer 1994, and was an unused substitute as AaB won the 1994–95 Danish Superliga championship. In June 1995, he extended his contract by an additional year.

Winde got his senior breakthrough with AaB during the 1995–96 Danish Superliga season. He was handed his Superliga debut in August 1995 by manager Sepp Piontek, replacing the injured Gill. When Gill suffered another injury in November 1995, Winde was praised for his displays for AaB. Even though Gill was ready for action in December 1995, Winde was preferred for the 1995–96 UEFA Champions League group stage game against Portuguese team FC Porto, which ended a 2–2 draw. As Gill left AaB in January 1996, Winde consolidated himself as AaB's first choice goalkeeper. He signed a two-year contract extension in May 1996.

In April 1997, Winde suffered a shoulder injury which forced him out of the team. In his place, reserve 'keeper Jimmy Nielsen impressed enough, that Winde was demoted to the role of reserve once he had regained his fitness later that month. He and Nielsen were seen by AaB manager Hans Backe to be very much on par, and Winde opted to sign a contract until the Summer 1999, eventually extending it until 2004. He spent the entire season on the bench once more, as AaB won the 1998–99 Danish Superliga championship.

By February 2000, Winde made public his desire to leave AaB on a loan contract. He was loaned out to Austrian Bundesliga club SW Bregenz in January 2001, brought in by manager Ove Flindt Bjerg, a former AaB player. He stayed with Bregenz for one-and-a-half years as the starting goalkeeper, before returning to AaB in May 2002.

Having played no Superliga games for AaB since April 1997, Winde agreed a January 2003 move to Superliga rivals Esbjerg fB. Winde forced Martin S. Jensen out of the team, and only missed a single Superliga game until September 2005, at which time he incurred a knee injury. He regained the starting position from understudy Jan Hoffmann in April 2006, and was part of the Esbjerg team which reached the 2006 Danish Cup Final, losing to Randers FC. He and Esbjerg also reached the 2008 Danish Cup Final, which was lost to Brøndby IF. Winde made the starting position his until the beginning of the 2010–11 Danish Superliga season. Following four straight Superliga defeats, Esbjerg manager Ove Pedersen decided to make Lukáš Hrádecký the starting goalkeeper in August 2010. Winde eventually reclaimed his position and Ove Pedersen made him Esbjerg team captain in March 2011.
