= Alex da Silva (footballer, born 1981) =

Brazilian footballer (born 1981)

Personal information
- Date of birth: 27 December 1981 (age 44)
- Place of birth: Catanduva, Brazil
- Height: 1.78 m (5 ft 10 in)
- Positions: Right midfielder; right-back

Youth career
- Internacional

Senior career*
Years	Team	Apps	(Gls)
2001–2002	Entrerriense		
2002	→ Botafogo (loan)		
2003	Vasco da Gama	8	(0)
2004–2005	Paraná Clube	3	(0)
2005–2007	Randers	53	(7)
2008–2010	Viborg FF	35	(5)
2010	Grêmio Catanduvense	22	(1)
2012–2013	Santacruzense	6	(0)
2016	Grêmio Catanduvense		
2017	Olímpia	1	(0)
2018	Penapolense	5	(0)
- * Club domestic league appearances and goals

Alessandro "Alex" da Silva (born 27 December 1981) is a Brazilian former professional footballer who played as a midfielder.

== Career ==
Born in Catanduva, São Paulo, Da Silva progressed through the Internacional academy, before making his senior debut as part of Entrerriense in the Campeonato Carioca. Afterwards, he played for Botafogo, Vasco da Gama and Paraná Clube.

In January 2005, Da Silva joined Danish 1st Division club Randers FC after director Jacob Nielsen and head coach Lars Olsen had scouted him on a trip to Brazil. He officially signed with the club on 19 July 2005 on a three-year deal, after having impressed in a friendly against AGF. His stint at the club was marked by injuries, but he managed to contribute with goals when healthy. During the 2007–08 Danish Superliga season, he struggled to find a place in the starting line-up, despite putting in several good performances.

Da Silva signed with Viborg FF on 31 January 2008 alongside Randers teammate Søren Ulrik Vestergaard. Viborg had signed and sold on many players during the January transfer window after the dismissal of head coach Anders Linderoth and the arrival of new manager Hans Eklund.

His contract with Viborg was terminated on 23 January 2010 because he chose not to return to training after the winter break, unlike the rest of the squad.

After leaving Denmark, Da Silva played for several clubs in his native Brazil before retiring from football altogether in 2018 as part of Penapolense.

== Honours ==
Vasco da Gama

- Campeonato Carioca: 2003

Randers

- Danish Cup: 2005–06
