= 2005–06 Danish 1st Division =

61st season of Danish 1st Division

Danish 1st Division
- Season: 2005–06
- Champions: Vejle; 2nd Danish 1st Division title 6th 2nd tier title
- Promoted: Vejle; Randers
- Relegated: LFA; BK Skjold; Brønshøj
- Matches: 240
- Goals: 769 (3.2 per match)
- Top goalscorer: Morten Nordstrand (Lyngby) (27 goals)
- Average attendance: 1,190

The 2005–06 Danish 1st Division season was the 61st season of the Danish 1st Division league championship and the 20th consecutive as a second tier competition governed by the Danish Football Association.

The division-champion, Vejle, and runner-up, Randers, promoted to the 2006–07 Danish Superliga. The teams in the 14th, 15th and 16th places, LFA, BK Skjold and Brønshøj, relegated to 2006–07 Danish 2nd Divisions, and would be divided between the 2nd Division east and west, based on location.

== Table ==
Pos	Team	Pld	W	D	L	GF	GA	GD	Pts	Promotion or relegation
1	Vejle (C, P)	30	19	6	5	62	32	+30	63	Promotion to Danish Superliga
2	Randers (P)	30	19	4	7	64	30	+34	61	Promotion to Danish Superliga and qualification to UEFA Cup first qualifying round (Note: Qualified as 2005–06 Danish Cup winners.)
3	Lyngby	30	18	5	7	68	44	+24	59	
4	Køge	30	17	8	5	59	35	+24	59	
5	Fremad Amager	30	15	4	11	54	55	−1	49	
6	Kolding FC	30	14	4	12	50	50	0	46	
7	Fredericia	30	12	5	13	48	40	+8	41	
8	Ølstykke	30	12	5	13	41	40	+1	41	
9	Herfølge	30	11	7	12	51	41	+10	40	
10	BK Frem	30	11	7	12	47	42	+5	40	
11	HIK	30	9	11	10	44	44	0	38	
12	AB	30	11	4	15	43	54	−11	37	
13	Brabrand	30	10	5	15	32	54	−22	35	
14	LFA (R)	30	9	7	14	51	53	−2	34	Relegation to Danish 2nd Divisions
15	BK Skjold (R)	30	4	6	20	27	75	−48	18	Relegation to Danish 2nd Divisions
16	Brønshøj (R)	30	1	8	21	28	80	−52	11	Relegation to Danish 2nd Divisions

Rules for classification: 1) points; 2) goal difference; 3) number of goals scored.
(C) Champions; (P) Promoted; (R) Relegated

== Top goalscorers ==
Position	Player	Club	Goals
1	Morten Nordstrand	Lyngby	27
2	Karsten Johansen	Randers	18
3	Rasmus Katholm	Brabrand	17
4	Anders Clausen	Køge	16
5	Danny Andersen	HIK	15
6	Henrik Toft	Vejle	13
-	Wassim El Banna	BK	13
8	Christian Holst	Lyngby	12
-	Thomas Christensen	Fremad Amager	12
-	Ulrik Balling	Vejle	12

== See also ==
- 2005–06 in Danish football
- 2005–06 Danish Superliga
- 2005–06 Danish Cup
- 2004–05 Danish 1st Division
- 2005–06 Danish 2nd Divisions
