= Søren Pedersen =

Danish footballer (born 1978)

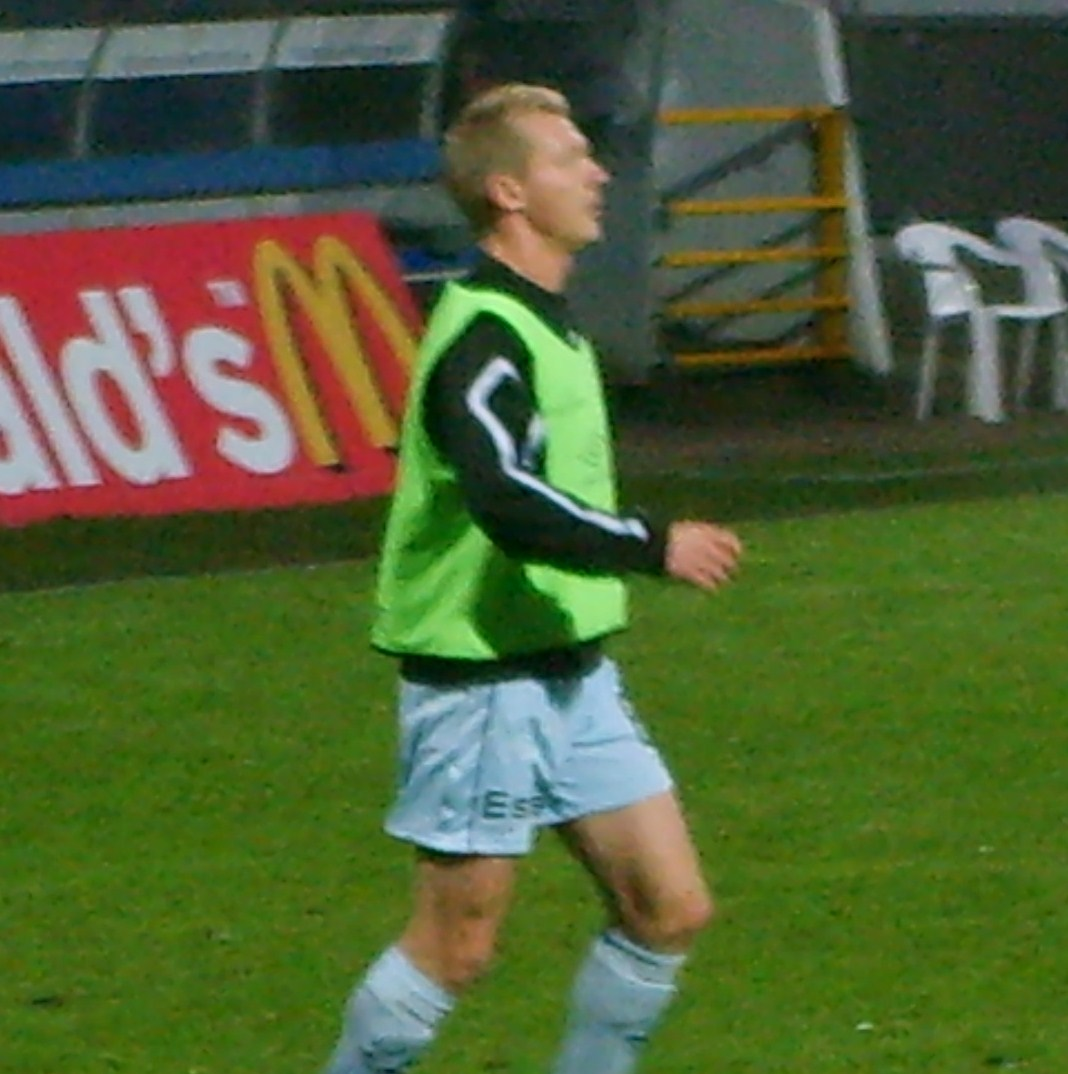

Personal information
- Date of birth: 2 November 1978 (age 47)
- Place of birth: Denmark
- Height: 1.78 m (5 ft 10 in)
- Position: Right-back

Senior career*
Years	Team	Apps	(Gls)
1997–1998	Randers FC		
1998–2001	Vorup FB		
2001–2005	AGF	71	(3)
2005–2012	Randers FC	175	(1)
- * Club domestic league appearances and goals

Søren Pedersen (born 2 November 1978) is a Danish former professional footballer who played as a right-back and spent most of his career at the Danish team Randers FC. He was once the captain of the team, and was a highly valued member of the squad.

== Honours ==
Randers

- Danish Cup: 2005–06
