= Kenneth Møller Pedersen =

Danish footballer (born 1973)

Personal information
- Date of birth: 18 April 1973 (age 53)
- Place of birth: Odense, Denmark
- Height: 1.73 m (5 ft 8 in)
- Position: Midfielder

Senior career*
Years	Team	Apps	(Gls)
1991–1993	Odense BK		
1993	Esbjerg fB		
1994–1996	Nørre Aaby IK		
1996–1998	B 1909		
1999	Ikast FS		
1999–2002	FC Midtjylland	64	(4)
2002–2004	Odense BK	57	(7)
2005–2009	Randers FC	110	(12)
2010–2011	FC Fredericia	35	(5)
- * Club domestic league appearances and goals as of 19 April 2008

Kenneth Møller Pedersen (born 18 April 1973) is a Danish former professional football midfielder.

== Honours ==
Randers

- Danish Cup: 2005–06
