= Martin Retov =

Danish football manager (born 1980)

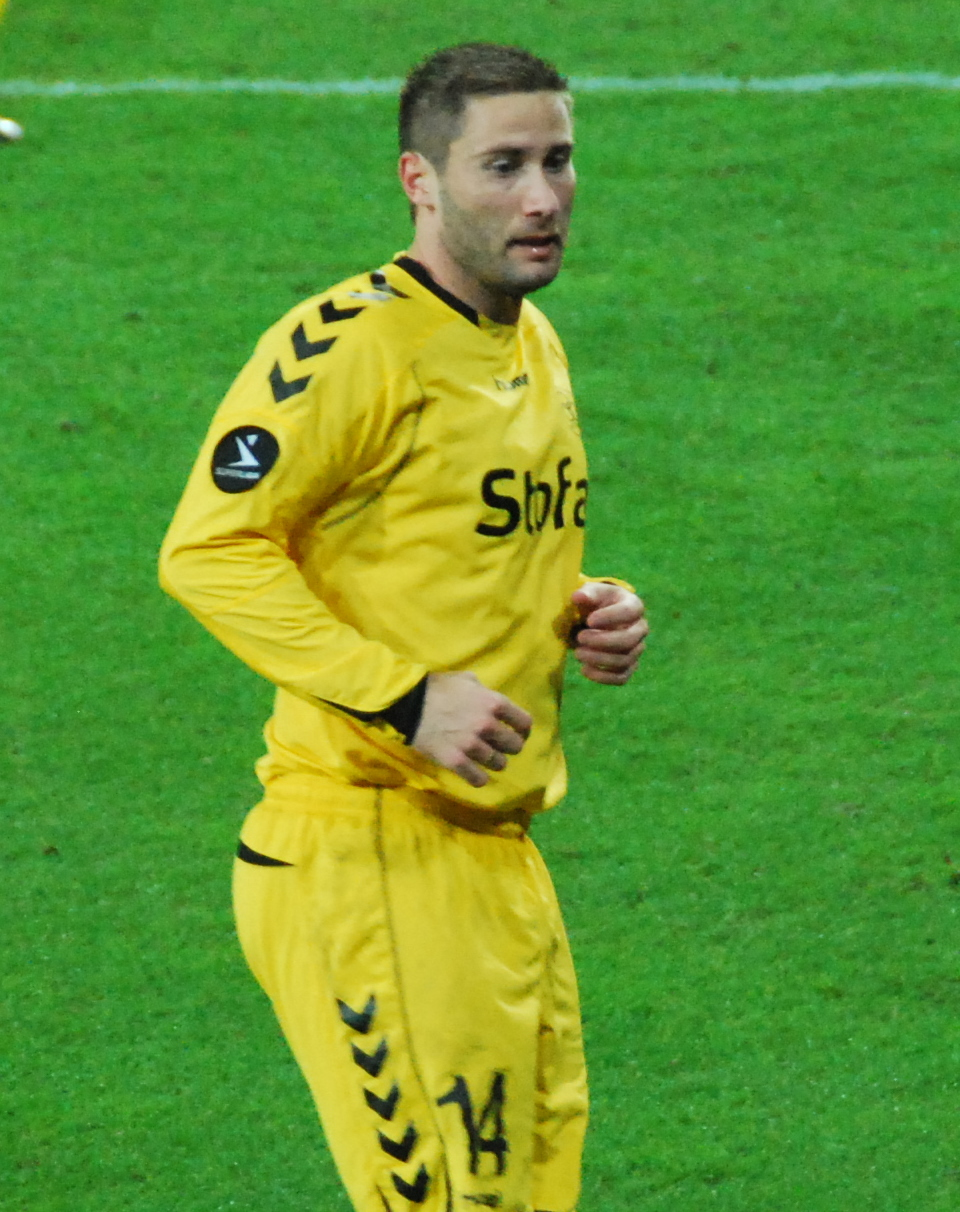
- Retov playing for Horsens in 2012

Personal information
- Date of birth: 5 May 1980 (age 46)
- Place of birth: Rødovre, Denmark
- Height: 1.78 m (5 ft 10 in)
- Position: Midfielder

Team information
- Current team: Hvidovre (Manager)

Youth career
- 1989–1995: Rishøj
- 1995–1999: Køge Boldklub

Senior career*
Years	Team	Apps	(Gls)
1999–2002	Køge Boldklub	89	(12)
2002–2008	Brøndby	220	(23)
2008–2010	Hansa Rostock	55	(4)
2010–2015	Horsens	120	(8)
Total		484	(47)

International career
2001	Denmark U21	3	(0)
2004–2008	Denmark	6	(0)

Managerial career
- 2015–2016: AGF U17 (assistant)
- 2016–2017: Brøndby U17 (assistant)
- 2017–2024: Brøndby (assistant)
- 2019: Brøndby (caretaker)
- 2024–2025: Horsens
- 2025–: Hvidovre
- * Club domestic league appearances and goals

Martin Retov (Danish pronunciation: [ˈmɑːtsʰin ˈʁeːtsʰʌw]; born 5 May 1980) is a Danish professional football manager, currently in charge of Hvidovre IF, and former player who played as a midfielder. He has played more than 200 games for Brøndby.

Retov began his career at Køge Boldklub, joining their youth team in 1996 and making his first-team debut in 1999. He experienced promotion to the Danish Superliga in the 2001–02 season, and after making 89 league appearances for Køge he moved to Brøndby IF. He played an influential role at the club for six seasons and was a key member of the team that won the domestic double in 2004–05 and three Danish Cups. In 2008, Retov was signed by Hansa Rostock for a fee believed to be €1 million. He became a regular and team captain during his time in Germany, but also suffered relegation to the 3. Liga in 2010. He ended his career at AC Horsens where he played between 2010 and 2015.

Retov has represented Denmark at under-21 and senior levels. He made his Denmark debut in 2004 and went on to gain six caps without scoring any goals.

After his active career, Retov embarked on a career in coaching, having been the assistant coach of AGF under-17, Brøndby under-17, and the assistant and caretaker coach of Brøndby's first team. In 2024, he was appointed head coach of Danish 1st Division club AC Horsens, where he had formerly been a player.

== Club career ==
=== Early career ===
Born in Rødovre, Capital Region of Denmark, Retov started his career in the youth teams of Danish club Rishøj Idrætsforening at age 8, where he played together with his friends from school. In his early playing days, Retov was a striker. Later, he moved to Køge Boldklub, where he eventually made his debut in the Danish 1st Division (second highest division) on 2 May 1999, starting in a 2–0 loss to Glostrup FK. At this point, Retov was 18 years old and a student at Solrød Gymnasium, an upper secondary school. After six months, Retov established himself in the starting-eleven of the first team, coached by Henrik Jensen. He signed a one-and-a-half-year contract extension on 20 August 2001. He made 88 appearances in the Danish 1st Division, in which he scored 12 goals.

In 2002, Køge earned promotion to the Danish Superliga and would compete in the 2002–03 season. Retov only played 10 minutes for Køge in the Superliga, before suffering a toe-injury.

=== Brøndby ===
While still recovering for his toe-injury, Retov signed for defending Danish champions Brøndby IF. He had been scouted by former Brøndby-legend John "Faxe" Jensen while the latter was a player-coach at Herfølge Boldklub. In a Danish 1st Division match between Køge and Herfølge, Retov had kicked "Faxe" in the head and received a red card for the offense, which had impressed the Herfølge player-coach who would later become assistant coach at Brøndby. He therefore became one of the first signings new Brøndby IF head coach Michael Laudrup. He made his debut for Brøndby in a 1–1 home draw with Levski Sofia in the UEFA Cup on 3 October 2002.

Retov quickly became a mainstay in the Brøndby team, and formed a successful duo with Morten Wieghorst in central midfield. He reached second place in the league table with the club during the 2002–03 and 2003–04 seasons, being voted Brøndby's 2004 Player of the Year. In the following season, Retov only missed one Superliga-match as Brøndby won its 10th championship. He also took part in the 2005 Danish Cup victory on the road to completing Brøndby's the Double triumph.

During the 2005–06 season, Brøndby ended in second place again and only reached sixth place during the 2006–07 season, which meant that Retov missed out in European football for the first time during his tenure at Brøndby. However, he was part of the team that won the 2006–07 Royal League by beating archrivals F.C. Copenhagen 1–0 in the final on 15 March 2007.

The 2007–08 Superliga season was horrific for Brøndby, only ending in eighth place after gaining five points from the first seven matches. However, the club won the Danish Cup – Brøndby's sixth – as Retov scored the decisive 3–2 winning goal in the 85th-minute of the final to beat out Esbjerg fB. The goal effectively meant that Brøndby reached the UEFA Cup qualification rounds.

=== Hansa Rostock ===
On 8 July 2008, Retov joined German 2. Bundesliga side Hansa Rostock, who had recently been relegated from the highest tier. The club had paid his release clause of around €1 million, of which German businessman Carsten Maschmeyer paid €850,000, money which he later reclaimed in court. Retov thus became the fourth Dane to play for Hansa Rostock, following in the footsteps of Kim Madsen, David Rasmussen and Thomas Rasmussen. He made his debut for the Ostseestädter on 9 August 2008 in a DFB-Pokal away win over Holstein Kiel, while debuting in the 2. Bundesliga on 18 August in a 2–2 away draw against MSV Duisburg in which he played a full 90 minutes. Only a few months after signing with Hansa, before the match against TuS Koblenz, head coach Frank Pagelsdorf appointed Retov team captain after Gledson had only worn the captain's armband for a short period. However, Hansa Rostock did not manage to challenge for promotion during the 2008–09 season, with only 14 points after 12 matches, which lead to Pagelsdorf being sacked on 11 November. Results worsened under his successor, Dieter Eilts, where the club dropped to the relegation zone, before Andreas Zachhuber stepped in to save Hansa from relegation. Retov attributed the turnaround to Zachhuber's positive attitude. The season ended with the club in 13th place in the table, two points clear of relegation play-offs, as Retov made two goals in 31 appearances.

In the following season, Retov only made 24 appearances for the club after receiving a seven-game suspension due to headbutting an opponent on 28 March 2010 in a match against FC St. Pauli. Therefore, he was not eligible to play while Hansa Rostock struggled in the lower end of the league table. In the end, the club suffered relegation to the 3. Liga after losing over two legs in the relegation play-offs to FC Ingolstadt 04. The relegation triggered a clause in his contract, which meant that Retov became a free agent after the relegation became a fact.

=== Horsens ===
==== 2010–2012 ====
On 7 July 2010, Retov joined Danish Superliga club AC Horsens on a two-year deal. He made his debut on 18 July in a 2–0 home loss to FC Midtjylland as a 60th-minute substitute for Anders Nøhr. On 25 July, Retov made his first start for the club in a Superliga fixture against Lyngby Boldklub, a game which Horsens lost 1–0 away. During the 2010–11 Danish Superliga season, Retov made 35 appearances in all competitions in which he scored no goals after Horsens finished the regular season in ninth place, avoiding promotion by a mere three points.

Citing the fact that he was now "an important piece" for the club, Retov scored his first goal for the club on 17 July 2011 in a 3–0 home win at Forum Horsens Arena over HB Køge, a merger project of his first professional club, Køge Boldklub. On 3 January 2012, Retov signed a two-year contract extension with Horsens after growing out to become an important player in the first team. Horsens surprisingly finished the regular season in fourth place, granting them access to the 2012–13 Europa League third qualifying round, but missing out on a third place in the last game of the season; a 3–0 loss to champions FC Nordsjælland. Despite missing out on bronze medals, Retov called the season "fantastic" after the club had only reached promotion to the highest division two years prior. He finished the season with seven goals in 35 appearances in all competitions, and was awarded the 2011–12 Player of the Season in Horsens at a season-ending party at Hotel Scandic in Horsens after having earlier won the 2011–12 Fighter of the Season at a sponsor event.

==== 2012–2014 ====
Prior to the 2012–13 season, Retov was named captain after the departure of former club captain Niels Lodberg. After suffering a groin injury in pre-season, he made his first start of the new season on 23 August 2012, in a Europa League qualifier against Portuguese side Sporting CP which ended 1–1. In the Superliga, Horsens struggled and were close to the relegation zone before the winter break. As his injury continued to irritate, Retov was sidelined during the winter break and parts of the fall due inflammation of the groin. He made a full recovery prior to the first game of the spring, in order to help Horsens in their battle against relegation. On 20 May 2013, the club went into the final day's fixtures needing a win to avoid relegation in a direct relegation-battle against Retov's former club, Brøndby IF at home. A dramatic endphase, in which Horsens thought they had scored the 1–0 goal after a towering header by Alexander Juel Andersen, was, however, cleared off the goal-line by Jens Stryger Larsen. Shortly afterwards, Brøndby's 10 men (following a red card to Brøndby-winger Quincy Antipas) had a quick counter-attack, where Dennis Rommedahl's low cross into the box found Lebogang Phiri who could easily score the 0–1 which meant relegation to the Danish 1st Division (second tier) for Horsens and Retov. He finished the season with 26 appearances in all competitions, in which he scored one goal.

Before relegation, Retov had stated that he would follow the team down a division, which he stayed true to by signing a three-year contract extension on 15 July. He made his first appearance in the Danish second tier since leaving Køge Boldklub in 2002, on 28 July in a fixture against AB which Horsens won comfortably 4–1. Horsens would, however, fail its mission to return directly to the Superliga after one season, ending on a disappointing fifth place in the table. Retov, retaining his role as captain, made 28 appearances in all competitions, scoring three goals.

==== 2014–2015 ====
Before the 2014–15 season, new coach Bo Henriksen decided to appoint Janus Drachmann captain, while Retov acknowledged that he would take a step back and play less, now being 34 years old. In October 2014, Retov suffered cartilage injury in his thighbone which meant that he would be sidelined for at least six months. Due to the severity of the injury, Retov stated in November 2014 that he was considering retiring from professional football. He, however, made his return in the spring, ending the season with 18 appearances in which he scored no goals.

Following the season, in which Horsens only reached a disappointing mid-table finish, Retov was released after having lost his place as a starter for the team. He effectively retired as a professional player on 6 August 2015, citing a desire to begin coaching.

== International career ==
Retov was called up for the Denmark under-21 national team in 2001, which he represented in three matches, coming on as a substitute in all three games.

He debuted for the senior team on 28 April 2004 in a friendly against Scotland, coming on as a late substitute for then Brøndby-teammate Morten Wieghorst as Denmark won 1–0.

== Coaching career ==
=== AGF ===
Retov was announced as AGF's under-17 assistant coach in August 2015, the same day as retiring as an active player.

=== Brøndby ===
In April 2016, it was confirmed that Retov would return to Brøndby IF in a coaching role. He was appointed as the assistant coach of the under-17 team. After Tamás Bódog left the role as assistant coach for the first team, Retov was promoted to interim assistant coach for the first team in March 2017. He signed a contract until the summer 2017.

The day after head coach Alexander Zorniger was sacked on 18 February 2019, Retov was appointed as caretaker manager of Brøndby with Matthias Jaissle as his assistant. As caretaker, Retov led Brøndby to a fourth-place finish, eventually beating Randers FC 4–2 at home in the European play-offs in order to secure a place in the first qualifying round of the 2019–20 Europa League.

After Niels Frederiksen was appointed head coach for the 2019–20 season, Retov continued as his assistant together with newly appointed Jesper Sørensen. On 5 March 2020, Retov was placed in home quarantine after having met with former Brøndby-player and teammate Thomas Kahlenberg, who had tested positive for SARS-CoV-2 in the early stages of the COVID-19 pandemic in Denmark. Kahlenberg had been infected at a birthday party in Amsterdam, the Netherlands.

Retov played a part in Brøndby IF's championship in the summer of 2021 as one of two assistants to Niels Frederiksen, along with Jesper Sørensen. Retov continued on as assistant coach to Jesper Sørensen, when he took over as the new head coach in the winter of 2023.

=== AC Horsens ===
On 18 March 2024, it was announced that Retov would be returning to his former club, AC Horsens at the end of the season, when he was presented as the club's new head coach. Retov signed a deal until June 2028.

On 1 March 2025, Horsens fired Retov.

=== Hvidovre IF ===
On 16 May 2025, a week after the departure of club legend Per Frandsen had been confirmed, Retov was announced as the new manager of the club, starting from the 2025–26 season.

== Managerial statistics ==
As of match played 28 February 2025

Managerial record by team and tenure
Team	Nat	From	To	Record								Ref
Team	Nat	From	To	G	W	D	L	GF	GA	GD	Win %	Ref
Brøndby (caretaker)	(Denmark)	19 February 2019	30 June 2019	18	9	4	5	32	22	+10	50.00	
Horsens	(Denmark)	1 July 2024	1 March 2025	22	11	4	7	38	31	+7	50.00	
Career total				40	20	8	12	70	53	+17	50.00	—

== Honours ==
- Danish Superliga: 2004–05
- Danish Cup: 2002–03, 2004–05, 2007–08
