= Kevin Conboy =

Danish footballer (born 1987)

Personal information
- Date of birth: 15 October 1987 (age 39)
- Place of birth: Esbjerg, Denmark
- Height: 1.85 m (6 ft 1 in)
- Positions: Left-back; centre-back

Youth career
- –1997: Jerne IF
- 1997–2008: Esbjerg fB

Senior career*
Years	Team	Apps	(Gls)
2008–2011	Esbjerg fB	77	(1)
2011–2015	NEC	118	(8)
2015–2017	Utrecht	25	(1)
2017–2020	Randers	60	(4)
2020–2022	Esbjerg fB	52	(3)
Total		332	(17)

International career
2012	Denmark	1	(0)
- * Club domestic league appearances and goals

Kevin Conboy (born 15 October 1987) is a Danish former professional footballer who played as a left-back or centre-back.

== Career ==
=== Esbjerg fB ===
Conboy is the son of a Danish father and an English mother and holds Danish and British citizenship. He joined Jerne IF's youth department from an early age. Afterwards, he moved to the Esbjerg fB youth academy.

In 2006, he joined the second team and was promoted to the first team in January 2008. He made his professional debut on 12 April 2008 when he came on as a substitute for Andreas Klarström in the 23rd minute of Esbjerg's 2–1 defeat to Brøndby IF. In the course of the rest of the season, he made four more appearances as the team finished in seventh place in the table. Until the relegation of the club after the 2010–11 season, Conboy had played 76 league games for Esbjerg fB.

=== NEC ===
For the 2011–12 season, Conboy signed a contract with Eredivisie club NEC. On 25 September 2011, he made his debut in a 2–0 defeat to RKC Waalwijk. On 11 March 2012, he scored his first goal in a 3–1 win over Twente after an assist from Ryan Koolwijk. This remained his only goal in 26 games this season. NEC finished eighth in the league and failed to qualify for UEFA Europa League in the first round of the post-season play-offs against Vitesse.

During three seasons with NEC, Conboy scored eight goals in 116 league appearances.

=== Utrecht ===
In September 2015, Conboy moved to Utrecht on a two-year contract. After playing for Jong FC Utrecht on 14 September 2015 in the 3–2 win over Jong FC Groningen in the Beloften Eredivisie, he made his debut for the first team on 19 September 2015 when he came on as a substitute for Louis Nganioni in the 67th minute of a 3–1 loss away against Willem II. He was sidelined with a back injury during the second half of the season. He made nine total appearances that season. Finishing fifth in the league, Utrecht qualified for the play-offs to participate in the qualification for the Europa League, in which they lost in the final to Heracles Almelo.

On 2 October 2016, Conboy scored his first goal for Utrecht in a 3–2 loss to Ajax. Conboy made two appearances in the KNVB Cup that season and 17 appearances in the league in which Utrecht finished fourth. In the following play-off round for Europa League qualification, Utrecht won against SC Heerenveen and AZ; Conboy did not make an appearance, however.

=== Randers ===
In August 2017, Conboy returned to the Danish Superliga where he joined Randers FC.

=== Return to Esbjerg fB ===
On 16 January 2020, Conboy returned to Esbjerg fB.

On 9 July 2021, Esbjerg confirmed that Conboy, alongside three teammates, had been removed from the first team and sent down to train with the U19s. It came in the wake of a riot between players from the squad and the club's new coach, Peter Hyballa. According to Danish media, the squad was very dissatisfied with the coach's methods, describing it as Hyballa was ... photographing players in underpants, punching the players, shaming them in front of their teammates, verbal torture and a training program so hard that the injuries was rolling in. After Hyballa decided to resign, Conboy was promoted to the first team squad again in mid-August. Conboy left Esbjerg at the end of the 2021–22 season.

== Honours ==
NEC

- Eerste Divisie: 2014–15
