= Martin S. Jensen =

Danish footballer and coach (born 1973)

Personal information
- Full name: Martin Sejr Jensen
- Date of birth: 10 July 1973 (age 53)
- Place of birth: Odense, Denmark
- Height: 1.89 m (6 ft 2 in)
- Position: Goalkeeper

Team information
- Current team: Hobro IK (goalkeeping coach)

Senior career*
Years	Team	Apps	(Gls)
1996–1997	OB	0	(0)
1998–2000	Randers Freja		
2001–2002	Esbjerg fB	50	(0)
2003–2004	OB	18	(0)
2005–2007	Randers FC		
2007	AaB	7	(0)
2008–2009	Skive IK		

Managerial career
- 2008–2009: Skive IK (assistant)
- * Club domestic league appearances and goals

Martin Sejr Jensen (born 10 July 1973), known as Martin S. Jensen, is a Danish football coach and former professional footballer who is a goalkeeping coach for Danish 1st Division side Hobro IK.

He played 134 games in the top-flight Danish Superliga championship from 2001 to 2007, representing Esbjerg fB, OB, Randers FC, and AaB. He won the Danish Cup with Randers and the Danish Superliga with AaB.

== Club career ==
Jensen began his career with local amateur club Korup near Odense, before moving to nearby top-flight Superliga club Odense Boldklub (OB) in 1996, where he served as an understudy to Danish international keeper Lars Høgh. He moved on to lower-league club Randers Freja, and played almost 100 games for Freja from 1998 to 2000, helping the team win promotion for the second-tier Danish 1st Division.

Jensen joined rival Danish 1st Division team Esbjerg fB in the Winter 2000, and eventually surpassed Benny Gall as the starting goalkeeper. Jensen helped Esbjerg win promotion to the Danish Superliga, and played all 33 games as Esbjerg finished 7th in the 2001–02 Danish Superliga season. In winter 2002, Esbjerg brought in new keeper Lars Winde. When Jensen made his dissatisfaction known, he was handed a free transfer, and rejoined with OB in January 2003, signing a two-year contract.

At OB, Jensen initially served as the understudy once more, this time to Det Gyldne Bur-winning goalkeeper Karim Zaza. When Zaza was sold in the Summer 2003, Jensen was handed a place in the starting line-up which he kept for 18 games. In winter 2003, OB bought a new Det Gyldne Bur-winning keeper in Arek Onyszko, and Jensen was demoted to the bench. In July 2004, Jensen announced his desire to let his OB contract expire at the end of the year 2004, as he had already agreed to join newly promoted team Randers FC, a club merger based on his former team Randers Freja. In August 2004, OB and Randers agreed on a transfer move, allowing Jensen to immediately join Randers.

At Randers, Jensen quickly established himself as the starting goalkeeper ahead of Christian Kemph. The season did not end well for Jensen, as Randers were relegated to the Danish 1st Division. As a 1st Division team, Randers and Jensen managed to win the 2005–06 Danish Cup, beating Superliga club Esbjerg fB 1–0 in extra time in the final. That same season, Randers won promotion for the Superliga, and Jensen signed a two-year contract extension in June 2006. In the following 2006–07 Danish Superliga season, Jensen missed only a single game (through suspension), as Randers finished eighth. When Randers signed Kevin Stuhr Ellegaard as their new starting goalkeeper in the 2007 summer transfer window, Jensen was not allowed to train with the first team, but was instead demoted to the youth team. Following a public dispute with Randers due to what Jensen contested as unfair treatment, he was released from all contractual obligations with the club on 16 July 2007.

Jensen soon after chose to join AaB Aalborg, signing a half-year contract with the club. He was brought in as a backup keeper, as AaB's newly bought first choice Karim Zaza was still recovering from a shoulder operation. Jensen was AaB's starting goalkeeper in the first seven games of the 2007–08 Danish Superliga season, including a 5–0 defeat to his former team Randers FC, and he also helped AaB beat Gent to advance to the 2007–08 UEFA Cup. When Zaza returned to fitness in September 2007, Jensen found himself as the second choice keeper for the Superliga games, but saw playing time in the Danish Cup tournament instead. In his six months at AaB, Jensen played 12 matches in all competitions for the club, in a season that would ultimately lead to AaB winning the Danish Superliga title in May 2008. By then, Jensen had already moved on.

In January 2008, he joined Skive IK in the Danish 1st Division as goalkeeper and assistant manager on a two-year contract. He had already agreed an extended contract with AaB, but AaB chose not to stop his dreams of gaining manager experience. Jensen stated that "I helped them out in a situation, as they help me in this situation". but he decided to end his career both as a player and manager.

== Coaching career ==
Jensen was goalkeeping coach for Hobro IK from 2014 until 2017, where he chose to focus on a civil career.

On 1 January 2022, Jensen returned as goalkeeping coach in Martin Thomsen's coaching staff at Hobro IK.

== Honours ==
Randers FC

- Danish Cup: 2005–06

AaB

- Danish Superliga: 2007–08
