= Niki Zimling =

Danish footballer (born 1985)

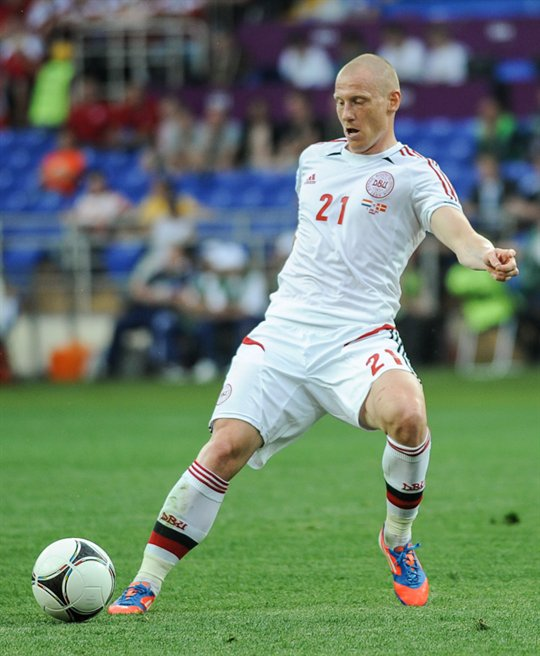
- Zimling playing for Denmark at the UEFA Euro 2012

Personal information
- Full name: Niki Dige Zimling
- Date of birth: 19 April 1985 (age 41)
- Place of birth: Tårnby, Denmark
- Height: 1.75 m (5 ft 9 in)
- Position: Defensive midfielder

Team information
- Current team: AC Horsens (Manager)

Youth career
- AB 70
- AB Tårnby
- Fremad Amager
- KB

Senior career*
Years	Team	Apps	(Gls)
2003–2005	Brøndby IF	17	(1)
2005–2009	Esbjerg fB	81	(16)
2009–2011	Udinese	5	(0)
2010–2011	→ NEC (loan)	26	(4)
2011–2013	Club Brugge	36	(2)
2013–2017	1. FSV Mainz 05	28	(2)
2014–2015	→ Ajax (loan)	9	(0)
2014–2015	→ Jong Ajax (loan)	3	(1)
2016	→ FSV Frankfurt (loan)	3	(0)
2016–2017	1. FSV Mainz 05 II	21	(1)
2017–2019	SønderjyskE	42	(5)
2021–2023	Kolding	12	(0)
Total		283	(32)

International career
2000–2001	Denmark U-16	5	(0)
2000–2002	Denmark U-17	23	(4)
2003–2004	Denmark U-19	12	(1)
2004	Denmark U-20	3	(0)
2006	Denmark U-21	5	(0)
2007–2008	Denmark League XI	5	(0)
2008–2013	Denmark	24	(1)

Managerial career
- 2023–2026: AGF (U19)
- 2026–: AC Horsens
- * Club domestic league appearances and goals

Niki Dige Zimling (born 19 April 1985) is a Danish former professional footballer and current coach, who is currently the manager of AC Horsens.

He was named 2006 Danish under-21 Talent of the Year, and played 24 games for the Denmark national team between 2008 and 2013.

== Career ==
=== Brøndby IF ===
Born in Tårnby, Denmark, Zimling started his football career at AB 70 when he was four years old. Zimling then joined Tårnby Boldklub, Fremad Amager and Kjøbenhavns Boldklub before he moved on to join the youth team of Brøndby.

Zimling then progressed through the club's youth system and contributed well for the team, scoring on a regular basis. It was well paid off when he offered a full time contract with Brøndby in July 2002. A month later, Zimling signed his first professional contract with the club and in doing so, he was promoted to the reserve squad. In January 2003, Zimling was promoted to Brøndby's first team squad for the first time. Shortly after, he extended his contract with the club, keeping him until 2005. On 27 April 2003 Zimling made his Brøndby debut, coming on as a 76th-minute substitute, in a 3–1 win against Aalborg BK in a Danish Superliga game. This turns out to be his only appearance of the season.

Ahead of the 2003–04 season, it was expected that Zimling would make a first team breakthrough at Brøndby. He then made his European debut, coming on as a second-half substitute, against Dinamo Minsk in UEFA Cup Qualification Round, as Brøndby won 2–0 to advance to the next round. On 17 September 2003 Zimling scored his first goal for the club, in a 1–1 draw against Aalborg BK. In a match against FC Midtjylland on 1 November 2003, he set up one of the goals for Brøndby, as the club won 2–0. Zimling played both legs in the UEFA Cup second round against Schalke 04, as Brøndby won on penalties to advance to the next round. Since the start of the 2003–04 season, he found his playing time, mostly coming from the substitute bench at the club. However, Zimling was plagued with injuries that saw him out for the rest of the 2003–04 season. At the end of the 2003–04 season, he went on to make seventeen appearances and scoring once in all competitions.

Ahead of the 2004–05 season, it was expected that Zimling would make a first team breakthrough at Brøndby. He made his first appearance of the season, coming on as a 68th-minute substitute, in a 0–0 draw against FK Ventspils in the first leg of the UEFA Cup second round qualification. In the return leg, however, the club were eliminated from the tournament through away goal after drawing 1–1 at home. Throughout the 2004–05 season, Zimling's first team opportunities was limited and his playing time mostly came from the substitute bench. Despite this, his contributions for the Brøndby led to the club winning the Double, both the league and Danish Cup. At the end of the 2004–05 season, he went on to make four appearances in all competitions. By the time Zimling departed from Brøndby, he played a total of 25 matches for the club and scored a single goal.

=== Esbjerg fB ===
With his contract expiring at the end of the 2004–05 season, Zimling chose to leave Brøndby to Superliga rivals Esbjerg fB on 18 August 2005, signing a three–year contract with the club. Esbjerg fB was interested in signing him a month before the move was made official.

He made his debut for Esbjerg fB, starting a match and played 76 minutes before being substituted, in a 2–0 loss against FC Nordsjælland on 28 August 2005. Since joining the club, Zimling quickly established himself in the starting eleven, playing in the midfield position. On 27 November 2005 he scored his first goal for Esbjerg fB, in a 1–1 draw against AC Horsens. After serving a one match suspension in April, Zimling scored on his return from suspension, in a 2–1 loss against Copenhagen on 9 April 2006. This was followed up by scoring his third goal of the season, in a 4–0 win against FC Nordsjælland. He then played in both legs of the semi–finals of the Danish Cup against his former club, Brøndby, and scored in the first leg, as the club won 5–3 on aggregate to reach the final. Zimling started the whole game in the Danish Cup Final, as Esbjerg fB lost 1–0 against Randers. At the end of the 2005–06 season, he went on to make thirty–one appearances and scoring four times in all competitions.

The 2006–07 season proved to be a breakthrough for Zimling, as he continued to establish himself in the starting eleven, playing in the midfield position for Esbjerg fB. On 6 August 2006 Zimling scored his first goal of the season, in a 5–3 loss against FC Nordsjælland. Two weeks later on 20 August 2006, he scored his second goal of the season, in a 4–2 win against FC Midtjylland. After missing one match through injury, Zimling scored on his return, in a 4–0 win against Viborg on 1 October 2006. He then scored two more goals by the end of the year, coming against Silkeborg and Viborg. His performance began to attract interest, as Ligue 1 side Stade Rennais wanted to sign him. This led the club willing to sell Zimling for the right price, but received no offers yet and he ended up staying at Esbjerg fB. Following his, Zimling then scored his sixth goal of the season, in a 2–1 loss against Odense BK on 18 March 2007. Two weeks later on 5 April 2007, he scored his seventh goal of the season, in a 1–1 draw against his former club, Brøndby. Zimling then added three more goals for the club against Viborg, Copenhagen and FC Midtjylland. Despite being suspended on two occasions (including being captain, only to be sent–off for a second bookable offence against his former club, Brøndby on 29 April 2007), he went on to make thirty appearances and scoring ten times in all competitions (making him Esbjerg's second top-scorer for the club, just behind Jesper Bech).

Ahead of the 2007–08 season, Zimling continued to be linked a move away from Esbjerg, with European clubs, including Bayer Leverkusen, Sampdoria, Lazio and even his former club, Brøndby wanted to sign him. Soon after being appointed as captain, he suffered a back injury that saw him miss the first two league matches of the season. On 30 July 2007 Zimling returned to the starting line–up against AGF and helped the club draw 2–2. A week later on 11 August 2007, he scored his first goal of the season, in a 5–2 loss against Copenhagen. However, during a 2–0 win against Vanløse IF in the second round of the Danish Cup, Zimling suffered a 'serious ligament injury' that saw him out for two months. On 22 October 2007 he returned to the starting line–up against FC Midtjylland and scored the equalising goal, in a 2–2 draw. Zimling then scored two more goals by the end of the year, coming against Herfølge and Lyngby. His performance continued to attract interest from Odense BK and Brøndby, who was interested to sign him in the January transfer window. It was agreed on 20 December 2007 that Esbjerg agreed to sell the player to FC Midtjylland. However, he rejected the move, preferring to leave the club in the summer. Following this, Zimling was continued to plagued with injuries on three occasions as the 2007–08 season was coming to an end. Despite this, he was featured in the Danish Cup Final against his former club, Brøndby, coming on as a second-half substitute, as Esbjerg lost 3–2. At the end of the 2007–08 season, Zimling went on to make twenty–one appearances and scoring four times in all competitions.

Ahead of the 2008–09 season, it was reported that Esbjerg was going to offer Zimling a new contract, but the club's chairman Jørgen Jensen denies this and expected him to leave in January. At the start of the 2008–09 season, he started the first four league matches of the season. This lasted until Zimling missed one match, due to an injury. He returned to the starting line–up against Horsens on 31 August 2008, as Esbjerg lost 1–0. However, Zimling's playing time was restricted for the rest of the year, due to being on the sidelines on three occasions. Despite aiming to score five or six goals as his target before leaving in January, Zimling failed to do that, as he went on to make nine appearances.

=== Udinese ===
When his contract set to expire in December 2008, it was announced on 20 July 2008 that Zimling would be moving to Serie A team Udinese on a free transfer and will join the club in January. The club were interested in signing him while he was playing for Esbjerg fB. At one point, Esbjerg fB and Udinese both reached an agreement to fast-track Zimling's transfer in August, but the compensation prevented it from happening.

However, he had to wait for two months to make his debut for the club after spending two months on the sidelines, coming against Genoa on 22 March 2009, starting a match and played 67 minutes before being substituted, in a 2–0 loss. Three weeks later on 12 April 2009, Zimling made his second start for Udinese, as he helped the club win 2–0 against Reggina. In the last game of the season, he came on as a substitute in the 82nd minute and provided an assist for Odion Ighalo, who went on just three minutes later just after Zimling went on as a substitute, in a 6–2 win over Cagliari. Having been placed on the substitute bench in the second half of the season, Zimling went on to make four appearances in all competitions.

In the summer transfer window of 2009, Zimling was linked a move away from Udinese, as Italians clubs were interested in signing him. At one point, he went back to Denmark to finalize a possible transfer, but the deal never materialized and he stayed at Udinese, who ultimately wanted to keep him. Zimling made his first appearance of the 2009–10 season, coming in the opening game of the season against Parma, as he started the match and played 66 minutes before being substituted, in a 2–2 draw. However, once again, Zimling's first-team opportunities were limited once again, due to emergence of midfield talent like Gökhan Inler, Gaetano D'Agostino, Christian Obodo and Fernando Tissone, as well as, his own injury concern. Throughout the 2009–10 season, the club tried to sell him, but failed to do so. On 27 January 2010 he made another first team appearance for the club, coming on as a late substitute, in a 1–0 win against A.C. Milan in the quarter–finals of the Italian Cup. Following this, Zimling was demoted to Udinese's second team for the rest of the season. In his second season at the club, he went on to make two appearances in all competitions.

==== NEC Nijmegen (loan) ====
On 8 June 2010, Eredivisie side NEC announced that they had signed Zimling on loan for the rest of the season. Upon joining the club, he was given a number six shirt ahead of the new season.

Zimling made his NEC Nijmegen debut, starting the whole game, in a 1–0 win over VVV-Venlo in the opening game of the season. This was followed up providing an assist when he won a penalty, allowing Björn Vleminckx to convert in a 5–3 win over Willem II. However, Zimling suffered a knee injury that saw him miss two matches. On 19 September 2010 he returned to the starting line–up against AZ Alkmaar, starting the whole game, in a 1–0 loss. Since returning from injury, Zimling quickly regained his first team place, playing in the midfield position. On 13 February 2011 he scored his first goals for the club, in a 2–0 win against Excelsior. This was followed up by scoring his third goal for NEC Nijmegen, in a 1–1 draw against Twente. Two weeks later on 5 March 2011, Zimling received a straight red card for a serious foul on Aleksandar Radosavljević, which the club lose heavily 5–1 against ADO Den Haag, resulting in him serving four games. After serving a four match suspension, he returned to the starting line–up against Ajax, as NEC Nijmegen lost 2–1 on 17 April 2011. This was followed by scoring his fourth goal for the club, in a 3–1 loss against FC Groningen. Despite missing three more matches due to suspension, he went on to make twenty–seven appearances and scoring four times in all competitions.

=== Club Brugge ===
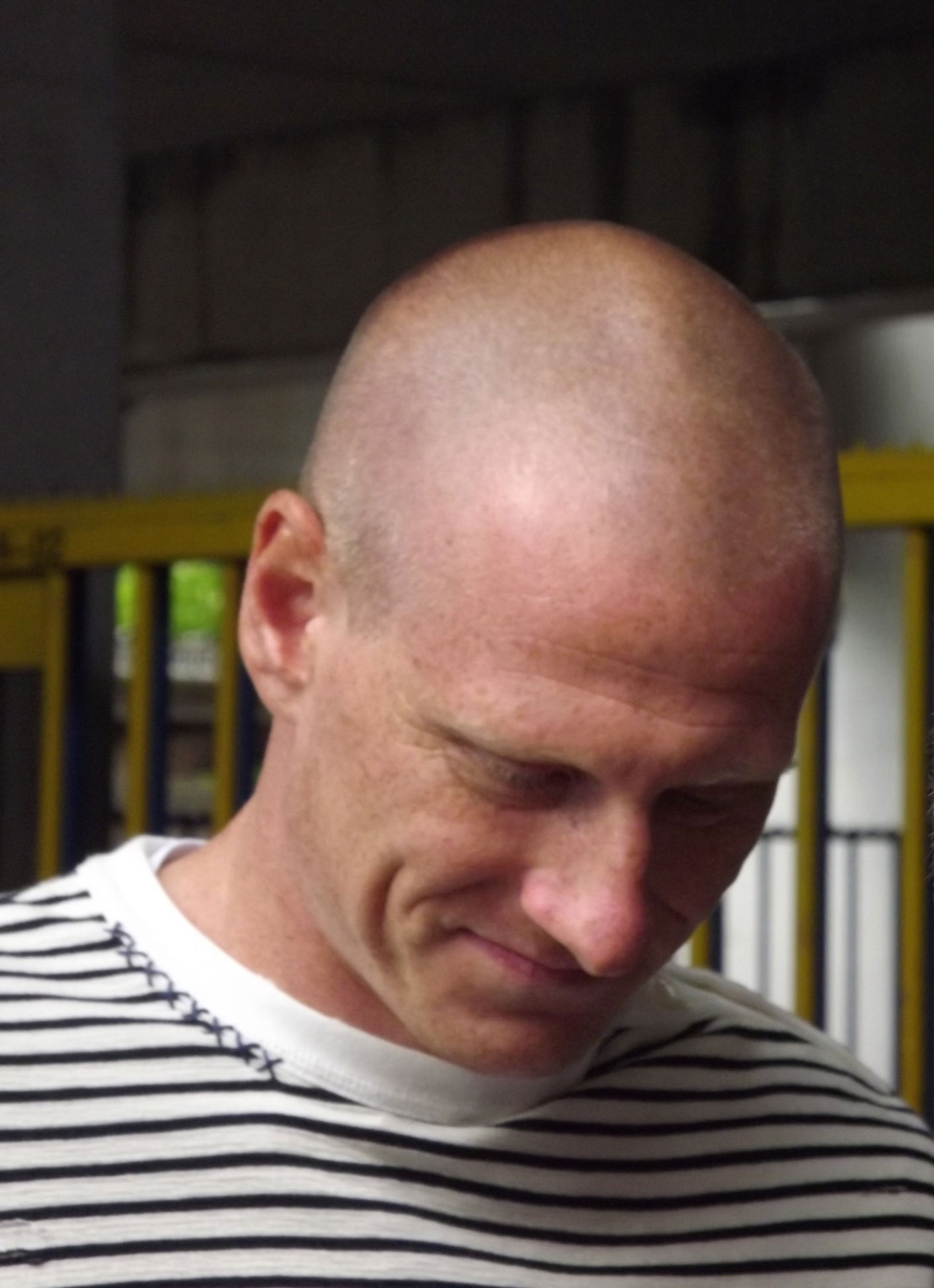
Niki Zimling pictured in 2012 from his time at Club Brugge.

On 27 May 2011, Zimling signed a four-year contract with Belgian football club Club Brugge, for a fee estimated to be around €500,000. Upon joining the club, he spoke about the fondness of Club Brugge, describing them as a "big club".

Zimling made his debut for Club Brugge debut, starting the whole game, in a 4–1 win against Qarabağ in the first leg of the third round of the UEFA Europa League. In the return leg, the club went through to the next round despite losing 1–0. Zimling made his league debut for Club Brugge, starting the whole game, in a 5–0 win over Westerlo in the opening game of the season. He played in both legs of the UEFA Europa League Play–Off Round against Zestafoni, as the club won 5–3 on aggregate. Since making his debut for Club Brugge, Zimling established himself in the first team, making impressive performance in the midfield position. Zimling scored his first goal coming against Gent in the second round of Belgian Cup, leading the match to go to penalty shootout following a 4–4 draw, and he converted the second penalty, as the club lost 4–2 in the shootout. Zimling captained Club Brugge in a number of matches along the way. He then scored his first league goal for the club, on 1 May 2012, in a 2–0 win over Standard Liège at the league play-offs. However, Club Brugge finished second place in the league after surrendering their title chances to rivals, Anderlecht. Despite being plagued with injuries and suspension throughout the 2011–12 season at the club, Zimling went on to make forty–six appearances and scoring two times in all competitions.

In the 2012–13 season, Zimling made six appearances in the first two months to the start of the season, including Club Brugge's elimination in a 3–2 loss against Copenhagen in the third round of the UEFA Champions League. However, he suffered a calf injury during a 2–0 win against Debreceni on 23 August 2012 and was sidelined for several months. Earlier this month, Zimling suffered the same injury that kept him out for one match. By early December, he was able to make a full recovery and returned to training for the first time in four months. On 9 December 2012 Zimling made his return by scoring his first goal for the club in a 7–1 win over Beerschot. After this, he went on to make three more appearances by the end of the month. By th time Zimling departed from Club Brugge, he went on to make ten appearances and scoring once in all competitions.

=== Mainz 05 ===
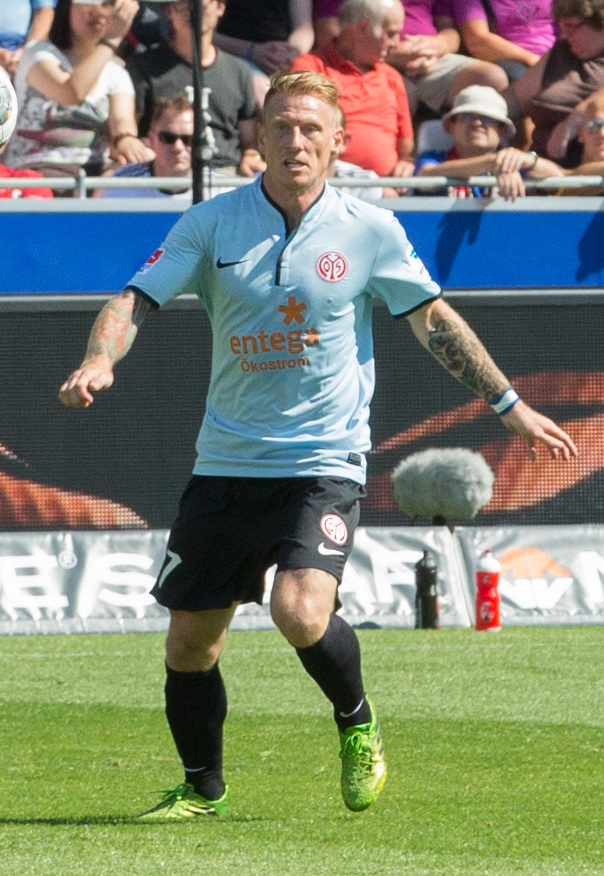
Zimling playing for Bundesliga side Mainz 05 in 2013.

After two-years at Belgium, Zimling joined Bundesliga side Mainz 05 on a four-year contract, which will keep him until 2017 and the deal believed to be worth around £1.75million. Upon joining the club, he said joining Mainz 05 was the next step to his career.

Zimling made his debut for the club on 2 February 2013 against German giant Bayern Munich, coming on as a 62nd-minute substitute, in a 3–0 loss. Three weeks later on 23 February 2013, he scored his first Mainz 05 goal, in a 1–1 draw against Wolfsburg. Three days later on 26 February 2013, Zimling scored his second goal for the club, in a 3–2 loss against SC Freiburg. Since joining Mainz 05, he quickly established himself in the midfield position for the rest of the season. At the end of the 2012–13 season, Zimling went on to make fourteen appearances and scoring two times in all competitions.

At the start of the 2013–14 season, Zimling started in the first four league matches of the season, including scoring his first goal of the season, as well as, setting up Mainz's second goal of the game, in a 2–1 win against SC Freiburg on 17 August 2013. However, he suffered a hamstring injury while on international duty and was sidelined for a week. On 24 September 2013 Zimling returned to the starting line–up against 1. FC Köln, playing 77 minutes before being substituted, in a 1–0 loss. Throughout the 2013–14 season, he found himself in and out of the first team, due to facing his own injury concern. At the end of the 2013–14 season, Zimling went on to make sixteen appearances and scoring once in all competitions.

However ahead of the 2014–15 season, Zimling tore his muscle fibre during a 5–1 win against Rot-Weiß Darmstadt in a friendly match. He was featured twice in the 2014–15 season for Mainz 05, including scoring against Chemnitzer FC in the first round of DFB–Pokal. Following his loan spell at Ajax came to an end, Zimling continued to struggle with injuries throughout the first half of the 2015–16 season.

In the first half of the 2016–17 season, Zimling was demoted to 1. FSV Mainz 05 II, the club's second team and continued to be plagued by injuries. In the second half of the 2016–17 season, he began to play regularly in the 1. FSV Mainz 05 II, including scoring against 1. FC Magdeburg on 4 March 2017. Despite the club's reserve side ended up being relegated, Zimling went on to make twenty–one appearances and scoring once in all competitions for 1. FSV Mainz 05 II. Following this, he was released by the club as his contract expired at the end of the 2016–17 season.

==== AFC Ajax (loan) ====
On 1 September 2014, it was announced that Zimling was sent on loan to Dutch Eredivisie side Ajax until the end of the season, with an option to buy.

He made his debut for the club, coming on as a 61st-minute substitute for the injured Nicolai Boilesen, in a 2–1 win against Heracles Almelo on 13 September 2014. Four days later on 17 September 2014, Zimling made his UEFA Champions League debut, coming as a second-half substitute, in a 1–1 draw against Paris Saint-Germain. However, he found his playing time mostly, coming from the substitute bench. Zimling also suffered injuries along the way that affected his time at Ajax. At the end of the 2014–15 season, he went on to make nine appearances in all competitions. Following this, the club decided against making a permanent move on Zimling and allowed him to return to his parent club.

==== FSV Frankfurt (loan) ====
On 1 February 2016 it was confirmed that Zimling was loaned out to FSV Frankfurt for the rest of the season due to lack of playing time.

He made his debut for the club, starting the whole game, in a 1–1 draw against Karlsruher SC on 7 February 2016. Zimling followed up by setting up FSV Frankfurt's only goal of the game, in a 2–1 loss against Greuther Fürth. However, in his third appearance for the club against St. Pauli on 19 February 2016, he ruptured his anterior cruciate ligament and was substituted in the 19th minute, as FSV Frankfurt won 3–1. Eventually, Zimling was sidelined with the injury for the rest of the 2015–16 season. As a result, his loan spell at the club ended on 5 May 2016 and returned to his parent club. Despite this, he went on to make three appearances for FSV Frankfurt.

=== SønderjyskE ===
It was announced on 30 June 2017 that Zimling returned to Denmark after eight years by signing for SønderjyskE on a two–year contract. Upon joining the club, SønderjyskE's sporting director, Hans Jørgen Haysen said about the player: "Zimling is a warrior, and if he can approximately reach the level he has previously had, he will surely become a profile for the club."

Zimling made his debut for SønderjyskE debut, starting a match in the defensive midfield position and played 77 minutes before being substituted, in a 0–0 draw against Randers in the opening game of the season. After the match, local newspaper JydskeVestkysten praised his debut performances. Since making his debut for the club, he quickly established himself in the first team, playing in the defensive midfield position. On 8 September 2017 Zimling scored his first goal for SønderjyskE, in a 3–2 loss against Hobro. However, during a 2–2 draw against FC Nordsjælland on 22 September 2017, he suffered a foot injury in the 27th minute and was substituted. After the match, it was announced that Zimling was sidelined between two and four weeks. On 29 October 2017 he returned to the starting line–up against Hobrom and helped the club draw 1–1. This was followed up by scoring his second goal for SønderjyskE, in a 3–0 win against Odense BK on 5 November 2017. After serving a one match suspension, Zimling returned to the starting line–up and captained the club for the first time against Jammerbugt in the Round of 16 of Sydbank Pokalen, in a 4–1 win. He then captained SønderjyskE on two separate occasions between February and March. Seven days later on 18 March 2018, Zimling scored his third goal for the club, in a 2–1 loss against FC Midtjylland. Two weeks later on 2 April 2018, he scored his third goal for the club, in a 2–1 loss against Odense BK. However, SønderjyskE were unsuccessful to qualify for the UEFA Europa League next season after losing 4–2 on aggregate against AGF. Despite being sidelined on three more occasions later in the 2017–18 season, Zimling went on to make twenty–five appearances and scoring four times in all competitions.

After missing the opening game of the season due to injury, Zimling made his first appearance of the 2018–19 season, coming on as a 65th-minute substitute, in a 2–2 draw against Odense BK on 22 July 2018. Since returning from injury, he was featured in the next eight matches for SønderjyskE. This lasted until Zimling missed two matches due to suspension. After missing two matches due to suspension, Zimling returned to the starting line–up against Vejle on 5 October 2018 and scored his first goal of the season, in a 3–0 win. Following this, he was then featured in the next eight matches for the club. However, Zimling suffered an injury that eventually kept him out for four months. On 21 April 2019 he returned to the starting line–up against AC Horsens, as SønderjyskE won 1–0. This was followed up by captaining the club for the second time this season, in a 4–1 win against Vejle to help the club avoid relegation. At the end of the 2018–19 season, Zimling went on to make twenty appearances and scoring once in all competitions.

Despite keen on extending his contract at SønderjyskE when it is going to expire at the end of the 2018–19 season, he was among four players to be released by the club.

== Retirement ==
On 14 June 2019 it was confirmed, that Danish 1st Division club Kolding IF had hired Zimling as the club's new sporting director. In doing so, he announced his retirement from professional football. At Kolding IF, Zimling's role was to handle scouting, community work, player recruitment and development for the club. His contributions saw Kolding IF finish in sixth place in the league. At the beginning of January 2021, Kolding IF abolished the position of sports director and Zimling became development director of the club instead.

On 27 August 2021, Zimling made his comeback as a player, when he was in the starting lineup of Kolding IF in the Danish 2nd Division match against Middelfart Boldklub.

On 12 January 2023, Zimling left Kolding to join AGF, where he was hired as U19 manager.

In April 2026 he became the head coach of 1st Division club AC Horsens.

== International ==
=== Youth career ===
As Zimling started out his professional football career, he was called up to the Denmark U15 and Denmark U-16 and Denmark U-17. At one point playing for the U17 side, Zimling once captained the team, which came against Italy U17 on 14 February 2002, as they won 3–0. Two months later, he was called up to the Denmark U17 squad for the UEFA European Under-17 Championship in Denmark. Zimling started the tournament well when he scored the national side's second goal of the game, in a 2–2 draw against Netherlands U17 on 27 April 2002. Zimling appeared in the next two matches to help Denmark U17 reach the knockout stage, but the national U17 side were eliminated from the tournament after he missed the penalty in a shootout in a 4–3 defeat against Spain U17 on 4 May 2002.

Having been called up to the Denmark U18, Zimling was called up to the Denmark U-19 squad for the first time in September 2002. On 27 February 2003 he made his debut for the U19 team. Zimling went on to make twelve appearances and scoring once for Denmark U19.

In June 2004, Zimling was called up to the Denmark U-20 for the first time ahead of the Milk Cup tournament. He went on to make appearances for the U20 national team. In March 2006, Zimling was called up to the Denmark U21 squad for the first time. He made his debut for the U21 side, coming on as a 74th-minute substitute, in a 2–1 loss against Croatia U21 on 1 March 2006. In May 2006, Zimling was included in the Denmark U21 squad for the UEFA European Under-21 Championship. However, he suffered an injury, leading him not to play any games at the tournament, as the U21 side were eliminated in the Group Stage. Zimling then captained two more matches for the U21 squad by the end of the year. He went on to represent Denmark 48 times for various national youth teams. Later in the same year, Zimling was selected for the Danish under-21 national team for the UEFA U-21 Championship 2006, and was named 2006 Danish under-21 Talent of the Year.

On 20 November 2006, Zimling was called up for the Denmark League XI national football team, for the trip to the United States, El Salvador and Honduras in January 2007, by national team manager Morten Olsen. He went on to make two appearances for the team. Zimling was also a part of the League XI team for their January 2008 tour. On 6 February 2008, he made his senior Denmark national team debut in a friendly game against Slovenia.

=== Senior career ===
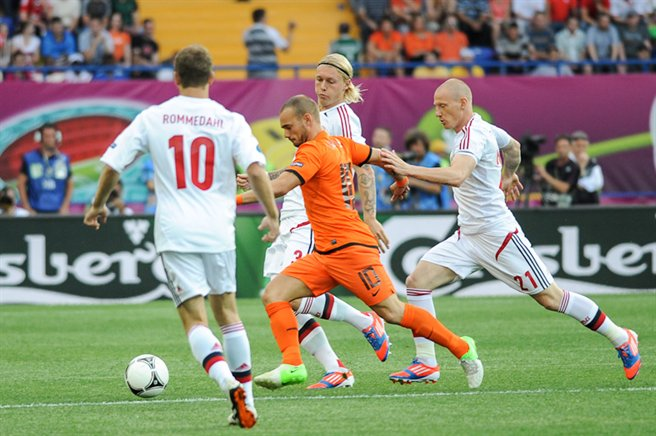
Zimling attempted to chase a ball from Wesley Sneijder during a match between Denmark and Netherlands in the UEFA Euro 2012 campaign.

On 12 November 2006, Zimling was called up to the Denmark squad for the first time, but withdrew due to injury. On 11 November 2010, after two and a half years waiting, he returned to the Denmark national team in a friendly against Czech Republic, earning his second match for the national team. Zimling made his first appearance for Denmark in two years against Czech Republic on 17 November 2010, coming on as a 69th-minute substitute, in a 0–0 draw. He was called up again when Denmark had to face Iceland, and played from the beginning because Christian Poulsen was in lack of match fitness. Zimling made his first start for the national team against Iceland on 4 June 2011, playing the whole game, in a 2–0 win. He played the rest of the qualification alongside his childhood friend William Kvist on the Danish midfield, as Denmark qualified for the UEFA Euro 2012.

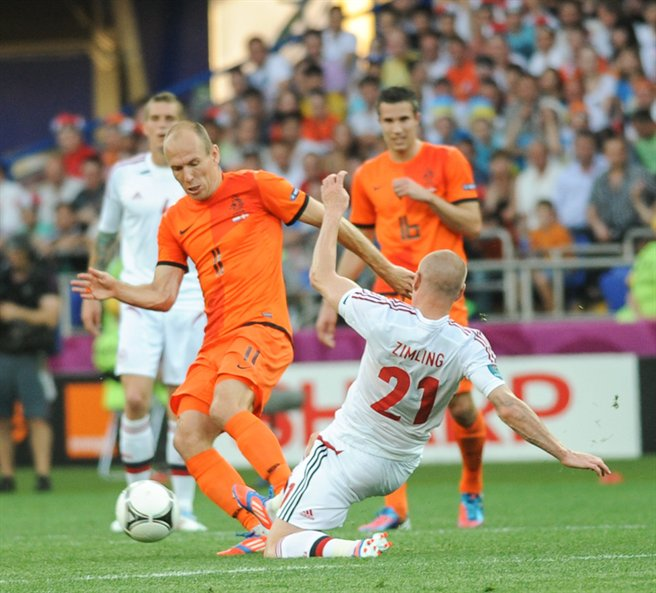
Zimling attempted to tackle a ball from Arjen Robben during a match between Denmark and Netherlands in the UEFA Euro 2012 campaign.

In May 2012, Zimling was inducted in the final squad for Euro 2012. However, on 8 June 2012, he suffered a toe injury while training for Denmark, putting his chances of playing in the tournament in doubt. But Zimling was given an injection and made his first appearance of the UEFA Euro 2012, against Netherlands on 9 June 2012, starting the whole game in the tournament, as the national team won 1–0. After the match, Ekstrabladet said about his performance, saying: "There was doubt about the big toe to the last. Zimling got ready and it was very important to make the central midfield work optimally. He often had a look at Mark van Bommel, but deserves huge praise for offering himself even in difficult situations. A great running job and above all a great overview." While Het Nieuwsblad said Zimling played an important part of the game, saying: "No other Danish player has hit the ball more than the player. He touched the leather 65 times, which is 13 times more than goalkeeper Andersen and 15 times more than Poulsen. In the Netherlands, only Wesley Sneijder (95 ball contacts) and Ron Vlaar (72 ball contacts) did better. Zimling was also at the top of the list in Denmark in the number of successful passes. No fewer than 51 passes from the player successfully reached a teammate." Zimling then featured two more matches in the tournament for the national team, playing in the left–back position against Portugal and Germany, as they were eliminated in the Group Stage. He made one more appearance by the end of the year, coming against Slovakia on 15 August 2012, starting a match and played 45 minutes before being substituted at half time, as Denmark lost 3–1.

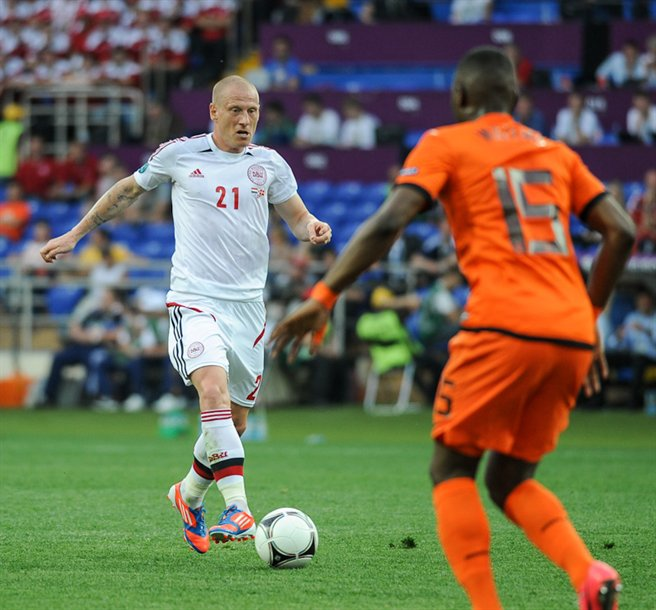
Zimling about to face Jetro Willems during a match between Denmark and Netherlands in the UEFA Euro 2012 campaign.

On 5 February 2013 Zimling was called up to the national team for the first time in five months. The following day, he made his first appearance for Denmark in five months, starting a match and playing 80 minutes before being substituted, in a 3–0 loss against Macedonia. A month later on 22 March 2013, Zimling scored his first national team goal, in a 2–0 win against Czech Republic for the 2014 FIFA World Cup qualification. He appeared three more matches of the qualification, as Denmark failed to earn a place in the World Cup after finishing second place. Following the national team's failure of qualifying for the World Cup, Zimling made two more appearances, coming against Norway and England. He then went on to make twenty–four appearances and scoring once for Denmark.

== Career statistics ==
=== International goals ===
Scores and results list Denmark's goal tally first.

#	Date	Venue	Opponent	Score	Result	Competition
1.	22 March 2013	Olomouc, Czech Republic	Czech Republic	3–0	3–0	2014 World Cup Qualification

== Personal life ==
Zimling has a younger brother, Jannik Zimling, who is followed his brother's footstep by becoming a footballer. At one point, Jannik went on trial at Club Brugge in 2012, around the same time, his older brother was playing. Zimling is in a relationship with his long-term girlfriend, Christina, and became a first time father in April 2012 when she gave birth to a baby boy, Oskar. Zimling stated that if he was not a footballer, he would be a carpenter.

Zimling once said he does not use social media, saying: "Twitter doesn't interest me". Zimling is a fan of tattoos, having first received it when he was eighteen years old.

== Honours ==
Brondby

- Danish Superliga: 2004–05
- Danish Cup: 2002–03, 2004–05

Kolding

- Danish 2nd Division: 2022–23
- 2006 Danish under-21 Talent of the Year
