= Søren Holdgaard =

Danish footballer (born 1979)

Personal information
- Date of birth: 30 January 1979 (age 47)
- Place of birth: Auning, Denmark
- Height: 1.88 m (6 ft 2 in)
- Position: Centre-back

Senior career*
Years	Team	Apps	(Gls)
1997–1999	Aarhus Fremad		
2000–2002	AC Horsens		
2002–2008	Randers FC	147	(7)
2009	Skive IK		
2009–2010	FC Blokhus		
2010–2013	FC Djursland		
- * Club domestic league appearances and goals

Søren Holdgaard (born 30 January 1979) is a Danish former professional footballer who played as a centre-back.

He has played a total 75 games in the Danish Superliga; with Aarhus Fremad from 1998 to 1999, and with Randers FC from 2004 to 2008.

== Honours ==
Randers

- Danish Cup: 2005–06
