= Rasmus Hansen (footballer, born 1979) =

Danish footballer (born 1979)

Personal information
- Date of birth: 15 February 1979 (age 47)
- Place of birth: Denmark
- Height: 1.77 m (5 ft 10 in)
- Position: Midfielder

Senior career*
Years	Team	Apps	(Gls)
1999–2003	Silkeborg IF	51	(0)
2003–2008	Randers FC	82	(1)
2008–2009	Valur		
2009–2012	Brabrand IF		
2012–????	FC Skanderborg		
- * Club domestic league appearances and goals as of 19 April 2008

Rasmus Hansen (born 15 February 1979) is a Danish retired professional football midfielder, who last played for FC Skanderborg. As of August 2011, he has started at Law School in Aarhus.

== Honours ==
Randers

- Danish Cup: 2005–06
