= Lars Larsen (footballer, born 1978) =

Danish footballer

Personal information
- Date of birth: 19 July 1978 (age 48)
- Place of birth: Frederikshavn, Denmark
- Position: Left winger

Youth career
- Understed IF
- Frederikshavn fI

Senior career*
Years	Team	Apps	(Gls)
–2000	Frederikshavn fI		
2000–2002	Randers Freja	66	(?)
2002–2003	Herfølge	14	(6)
2003–2009	Randers	64	(16)
2005	→ OB (loan)	5	(0)
2008	→ Skive (loan)	0	(0)
- * Club domestic league appearances and goals

Lars Larsen (born 19 July 1978) is a Danish former professional footballer who played as a left winger.

== Career ==
Larsen started his career with Frederikshavn fI, but would most notably play for Randers Freja and the successor club, Randers FC, recording 73 games and 17 goals for the club. In between his stints with Randers, Larsen had a tenure with Herfølge Boldklub where he moved in January 2003 for kr. 500,000.

Larsen retired from football in 2008 after persistent injuries, and since worked as a salesman for Sports Direct while playing lower level football for Kristrup Boldklub.

== Honours ==
Randers

- Danish Cup: 2005–06
