= Martin Thomsen (footballer, born 1980) =

Danish footballer

Personal information
- Date of birth: October 31, 1980 (age 46)
- Place of birth: Denmark
- Height: 1.79 m (5 ft 10 in)
- Position: Left back

Youth career
- 19??–1993: BNS
- 1993–1998: Haderslev FK

Senior career*
Years	Team	Apps	(Gls)
1998–2008	SønderjyskE	104	(0)
2008–2011	Kolding FC		
2011–2014	Kolding IF		
- * Club domestic league appearances and goals

Martin Thomsen (born October 31, 1980) is a Danish retired professional football defender. He has previously played in the Danish Superliga with SønderjyskE.
