= Fabinho (footballer, born 1977) =

Brazilian footballer

Personal information
- Full name: Fabio Trinidade da Silveira
- Date of birth: 26 May 1977 (age 49)
- Place of birth: Pantano Grande, Brazil
- Height: 1.73 m (5 ft 8 in)
- Position: Forward

Youth career
- Santa Cruz

Senior career*
Years	Team	Apps	(Gls)
- Corinthians
- Esportivo
- Glória
2005–2008	Randers	52	(15)
2008–2009	Herfølge	17	(6)
2009–2013	HB Køge	53	(12)
- * Club domestic league appearances and goals as of 17:00, 11 March 2010 (UTC)

Fabio Trinidade da Silveira (born 26 May 1977 in Pantano Grande, Rio Grande do Sul), commonly known as Fabinho, is a Brazilian footballer who plays as a forward. He is currently a free agent.

== Club career ==
=== Randers ===
Fabinho got a good start of 2008. Due to Randers FC's new strikers Marc Nygaard and Søren Berg, Fabinho found himself sidelined in the first two matches. However, he was used as a substitute in the first two matches against Brøndby IF. In both games, Fabinho managed to score a goal as the only one on the Randers FC team. However this was not enough to secure victory since Randers FC lost both games.

Fabinho proved his value as a late sub again on April 19 when Randers FC played against FC Copenhagen. Fabinho scored the winning goal in the ending minutes.

=== Herfølge & HB Køge ===
In 2008, Fabinho signed with former Danish Champions, Herfølge Boldklub. After a good season for Fabinho, Herfølge merged with Køge Boldklub to form new team HB Køge. Fabinho currently plays for HB Køge in the highest Danish division.
