= Anders Nøhr =

Danish footballer (born 1981)

Personal information
- Date of birth: 3 September 1981 (age 45)
- Place of birth: Ikast, Denmark
- Height: 1.78 m (5 ft 10 in)
- Positions: Winger; fullback

Youth career
- Ikast KFUM

Senior career*
Years	Team	Apps	(Gls)
1999–2001	FC Midtjylland		
2001–2004	AC Horsens		
2004–2007	Esbjerg fB	41	(4)
2007–2012	AC Horsens	106	(2)
- * Club domestic league appearances and goals as of 29 May 2011

Anders Nøhr (born 3 September 1981) is a Danish former professional football player, who played for the FC Midtjylland, AC Horsens, Esbjerg fB and returned to Danish Superliga side AC Horsens. He retired from his professional football career by the end of 2012. He played as defender and midfielder.
