= Adeola Lanre Runsewe =

Nigerian footballer (born 1989)

Ade Runsewe
Personal information
- Full name: Adeola Lanre Runsewe
- Date of birth: 1 December 1989 (age 36)
- Place of birth: Nigeria
- Height: 1.68 m (5 ft 6 in)
- Position: Midfielder

Team information
- Current team: Baf Ülkü Yurdu
- Number: 99

Youth career
- –2007: FC Ebedei
- 2007–2008: FC Midtjylland

Senior career*
Years	Team	Apps	(Gls)
2008–2009	FC Midtjylland	5	(0)
2008–2009	→ Skive IK (loan)	13	(2)
2010	FC Hjørring		
2010–2011	Trelleborg	0	(0)
2011–2012	HB Køge	34	(4)
2012–2016	Silkeborg IF	61	(2)
2017	ÍF Fuglafjørður		
2017	Al Islah	5	(0)
2019	Remo Stars		
2019–	Baf Ülkü Yurdu	20	(6)
- * Club domestic league appearances and goals as of 21:54, 19 February 2020 (UTC)

Adeola Lanre Runsewe (born 1 December 1989) is a Nigerian professional footballer who plays as a midfielder for Turkish Cypriot club Baf Ülkü Yurdu.

== Career ==
On 19 June 2011, Runsewe's contract with HB Køge was turned into a professional one with a duration of two years.

Having joined Silkeborg IF in 2012 he left the club in summer 2016 after his contract ran out.

In February 2017 Runsewe signed for Faroese club ÍF Fuglafjørður.

On 7 September 2019, Runsewe joined Turkish Cypriot club Baf Ülkü Yurdu.
