= Søren Ulrik Vestergaard =

Danish footballer (born 1987)

Personal information
- Date of birth: 4 May 1987 (age 39)
- Place of birth: Denmark
- Height: 1.89 m (6 ft 2 in)
- Position: Forward

Youth career
- Sorring IF
- Silkeborg IF

Senior career*
Years	Team	Apps	(Gls)
2005–2007	Silkeborg IF	26	(6)
2007–2008	Randers FC	14	(0)
2008	→ Viborg FF (loan)	15	(3)
2008–2010	Viborg FF	20	(6)

International career^{‡}
2002	Denmark U-16	2	(0)
2003–2004	Denmark U-17	13	(3)
2004	Denmark U-18	2	(2)
2004–2006	Denmark U-19	19	(3)
2007–2010	Denmark U-21	8	(0)
- * Club domestic league appearances and goals as of 17 August 2009 ‡ National team caps and goals as of 4 July 2009

Søren Ulrik Vestergaard (born 4 May 1987) is a Danish former professional football player.

He came to Randers FC from Silkeborg IF, and his transfer was set for 1 January 2008, where his contract expired, but Randers and Silkeborg came to an agreement about the transfer sum on 21 June 2007.

In spring 2008 he was loaned to Viborg FF; on the 1 July he joined them permanently.

Søren Ulrik Vestergaard graduated from Silkeborg Amtsgymnasium (now known as Silkeborg Gymnasium) in 2005.

He retired on 19 July 2010 to pursue a career outside football.
