= Lars Christian Termansen =

Danish footballer (born 1979)

Personal information
- Date of birth: 17 June 1979 (age 47)
- Place of birth: Denmark
- Height: 1.87 m (6 ft 2 in)
- Position: Defender

Team information
- Current team: Kolding FC

Youth career
- SGI

Senior career*
Years	Team	Apps	(Gls)
2001–2008	Esbjerg fB	75	(1)
2004	→ AC Horsens (loan)		
2008–present	Kolding FC	53	(?)
- * Club domestic league appearances and goals as of 1 August 2010

Lars Christian Termansen (formerly Nielsen, born 17 June 1979) is a Danish professional football defender, who currently plays at Kolding FC.
