= Anders Rasmussen =

Danish footballer and coach (born 1976)

Personal information
- Full name: Anders Rasmussen
- Date of birth: 1 June 1976 (age 50)
- Place of birth: Denmark
- Height: 1.89 m (6 ft 2 1/2 in)
- Position: Goalkeeper

Team information
- Current team: Youth goalkeeper coach - AGF

Youth career
- HOG Hinnerup
- AGF

Senior career*
Years	Team	Apps	(Gls)
1997–1999	AGF	0	(0)
1999–2001	AC Horsens		
2001–2008	FC Midtjylland	48	(0)
2007	→ Viborg FF (loan)	3	(0)
2008	Viborg FF	0	(0)
2009–2011	AGF	3	(0)

Managerial career
- 2011–: AGF (youth goalkeeper coach)
- * Club domestic league appearances and goals

Anders Rasmussen (born 1 June 1976) is a Danish retired footballer who played as a goalkeeper. He is currently working as a goalkeeping coach for the youth teams of AGF.

He played 54 games in the Danish Superliga championship from 2003 to 2010, representing FC Midtjylland, Viborg FF, and AGF. He had good reaction skills, but was insecure in the air.

== Biography ==
Rasmussen started his career in the Danish club Aarhus Gymnastik Forening (AGF) in 1997, playing in the secondary Danish 1st Division. He stayed two years with AGF, but did not get on the pitch for the club. He moved on to league rivals AC Horsens in 1999. In 2001, Rasmussen was brought to FC Midtjylland (FCM) in the top-flight Danish Superliga championship. He was initially a reserve for Danish international goalkeeper Peter Skov-Jensen. Rasmussen did not get a chance for an extended run in the team, before FCM sold Peter Skov-Jensen in January 2005.

After the sale, Rasmussen became the first choice goalkeeper, and helped FCM win bronze medals in the 2004–05 Superliga season. For the 2005–06 season, Rasmussen was in contention with Swedish goalkeeper Ola Tidman, and Rasmussen eventually won a place in the starting line-up. In the first half of the 2006–07 season, Rasmussen played 13 of FCM's first 18 games. In January 2007, FCM bought Czech goalkeeper Martin Raška, to be the new first choice keeper. Rasmussen wanted to secure a move away from FCM, and tried to get a contract with the Norwegian club Fredrikstad FK. He did not succeed, and returned to FCM, where he found himself surpassed by Martin Raška and the ten years younger Lasse Heinze.

Rasmussen moved on to Superliga club Viborg FF, playing there for two years. He moved back to AGF in January 2009, as the second-choice keeper behind Steffen Rasmussen. He played three games in the 2009–10 Danish Superliga season. In February 2011, Rasmussen was given the position of goalkeeping coach for the AGF youth teams. Anders Rasmussen ended his active football career in June 2011 to become deputy manager of a grocery store. When Steffen Rasmussen was injured in July 2011, AGF asked for Anders Rasmussen to re-kindle his active career. He accepted and was the reserve goalkeeper for the newly purchased Emil Ousager.
