= Thomas Rasmussen =

Danish footballer (born 1977)

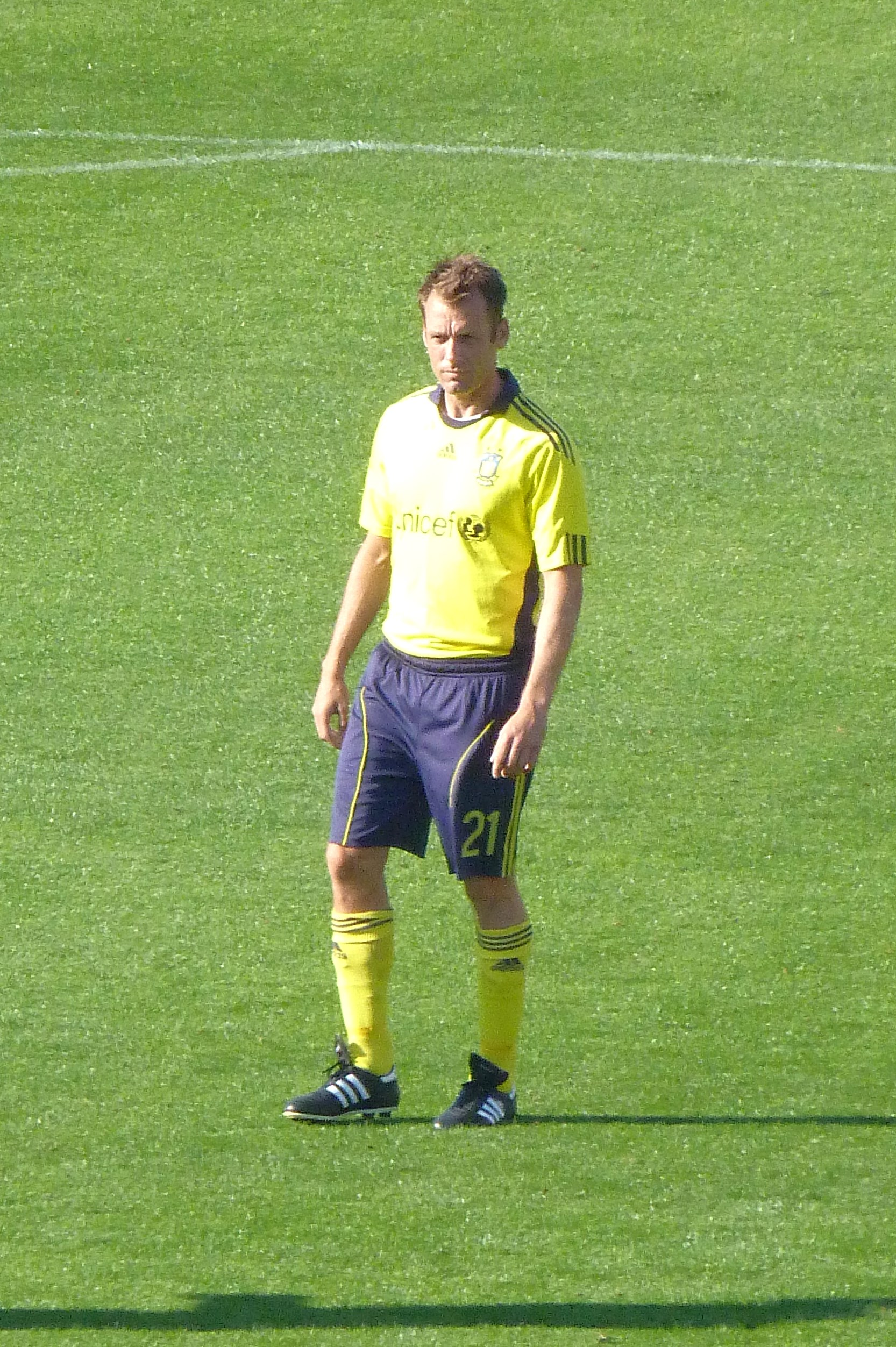
- Rasmussen playing for Brøndby IF in 2011

Personal information
- Full name: Thomas Schultz Rasmussen
- Date of birth: 16 April 1977 (age 49)
- Place of birth: Frederiksberg, Denmark
- Height: 1.83 m (6 ft 0 in)
- Position: Left wing back

Youth career
- 1983–1984: Boldklubben Dalgas
- 1984–1995: KB

Senior career*
Years	Team	Apps	(Gls)
1995–1996	Glostrup FK	15	(14)
1996–1999	Sint-Truiden	34	(5)
1999–2000	Skjold Birkerød	15	(7)
2000–2003	Farum	94	(12)
2003	FC Nordsjælland	8	(0)
2003–2005	Hansa Rostock	62	(7)
2005–2011	Brøndby IF	139	(13)
2012–2013	Lyngby BK	35	(0)

International career
1996–1997	Denmark U19	3	(2)
2003–2008	Denmark	8	(0)

Managerial career
- 2013: Taastrup FC (women)
- * Club domestic league appearances and goals

Thomas Schultz Rasmussen (born 16 April 1977) is a Danish former professional footballer who played as a left wingback. He played eight games for the Denmark national team, both as wingback and attacking midfielder.

== Career ==
Born in Frederiksberg in Copenhagen, Rasmussen started his career in minor Danish club Glostrup IF 32. He debuted on the Danish under-19 national team in July 1996, and moved abroad to play for K. Sint-Truidense V.V. in Belgium. He returned to Denmark to play for an amateur club in Birkerød. When he got married in 1998, Rasmussen took his wife's last name, naming himself Thomas Schultz.

In 2000, Schultz made his debut for Farum B.K. in the Danish 1st Division. He helped Farum win promotion for the top-flight Danish Superliga in 2002. During the 2002–03 Danish Superliga season, Schultz played 31 of 33 league games, scoring five league goals. He made his debut for the Danish national team in April 2003. In the summer 2003, Schultz moved to Germany, to play for Hansa Rostock in the top-flight Bundesliga. At Rostock, he joined fellow Dane Kim Madsen. In August 2003, Schultz changed his name back to Rasmussen, at the initiative of Hansa Rostock. He had never legally changed his last name, and Rostock wanted him to use the name on his birth certificate; Thomas Rasmussen.

In his first season at Rostock, Rasmussen played 28 of 34 league games and scored three goals, helping Rostock finish in ninth place. He was called up for the Danish national team once more, and played his second national team game in April 2004. In the 2004–05 Bundesliga season, Rasmussen played 31 league games and scored four goals, but Rostock finished in 17th place, and was relegated to the 2. Bundesliga. Having played two 2. Bundesliga games for Rostock, Rasmussen returned to Denmark in August 2005, to play for defending Danish Superliga champions Brøndby IF.
