= Dalil Benyahia =

Algerian-Swedish footballer (born 1990)

Personal information
- Date of birth: 21 April 1990 (age 36)
- Place of birth: Stockholm, Sweden
- Height: 1.74 m (5 ft 9 in)
- Position: Midfielder

Team information
- Current team: IK Sirius

Youth career
- 1996–2001: Vendelsö IK
- 2001–2007: Brommapojkarna

Senior career*
Years	Team	Apps	(Gls)
2007–2008	Brommapojkarna	2	(0)
2008	Vejle	0	(0)
2009–2011	Brommapojkarna	58	(3)
2012–2014	Sirius	31	(4)

International career^{‡}
2007	Sweden U19	3	(0)
2010	Algeria U23	1	(0)
- * Club domestic league appearances and goals as of 23 November 2013 ‡ National team caps and goals as of 00:00, 15 April 2012 (UTC)

Dalil Benyahia (born 21 April 1990) is a former Algerian-Swedish footballer who last played for IK Sirius.

== Career ==
Benyahia was born in Stockholm, Sweden.

In 2004, Benyahia was chosen as the player of the tournament at the Nike Cup in Sweden and represented the country in a week-long high performance training session at Manchester United. In 2006, he was given a one-week trial by Chelsea FC. The following year, he also received a ten-day trial with Ajax Amsterdam.

On 14 July 2008, Benyahia signed a three-year contract with Vejle BK after impressing on trial. He returned to IF Brommapojkarna in 2009, and was released in 2011.

On 2 August 2012, after some time as a free agent, Benyahia was reunited with former Brommapojkarna coach Kim Bergstrand, signing a 2 1/2-year contract with IK Sirius.

He retired from professional football after the 2014 season.

== International career ==
On 29 September 2010, Benyahia was called up to the Algerian Under-23 national team for a friendly against Qatar. On 12 October, he made his debut starting in the game, with Algeria winning 1–0.
