= Jan Hoffmann (Danish footballer) =

Danish footballer (born 1971)

Personal information
- Date of birth: 4 May 1971 (age 55)
- Place of birth: Denmark
- Height: 1.89 m (6 ft 2 in)
- Position: Goalkeeper

Team information
- Current team: AB (youth goalkeeper coach)

Senior career*
Years	Team	Apps	(Gls)
1991–1993	Ølstykke FC		
1993–1997	Boldklubben 1893		
1997–2003	AB	166	(0)
2003–2004	FC Nordsjælland	26	(0)
2004–2006	Esbjerg fB	23	(0)
2007–2008	Vejle Boldklub	32	(0)
2009–2010	IF Skjold Birkerød		
2016–2017	FC Græsrødderne		

Managerial career
- 2008–2009: Lyngby Boldklub (goalkeeping coach)
- 2010–2011: Allerød FK (goalkeeping coach)
- 2011–2016: Brøndby IF (goalkeeping coach)
- 2018–: AB (youth goalkeeper coach)
- * Club domestic league appearances and goals

Jan Hoffmann (born 4 May 1971) is a Danish former professional football player. He is currently working as a goalkeeper coach for the U17 and U19 squads of AB. He previously played for the Superliga clubs Akademisk Boldklub, FC Nordsjælland and Vejle BK, as well as other Danish lower-league clubs.

== Honours ==
Akademisk Boldklub

- Danish Cup: 1998–99
