= Theis F. Rasmussen =

Danish footballer (born 1984)

Personal information
- Full name: Theis Frydenlund Rasmussen
- Date of birth: 12 July 1984 (age 42)
- Place of birth: Denmark
- Height: 1.84 m (6 ft 0 in)
- Position: Goalkeeper

Youth career
- 1990–1999: Fremad Amager
- 1999–2002: B93

Senior career*
Years	Team	Apps	(Gls)
2002–2004	B93		
2004–2005	Akademisk Boldklub		
2005–2007	Vejle Boldklub	46	(0)
2008	BK Frem	0	(0)
2008	FC Nordsjælland	0	(0)
2009	Kolding FC	5	(0)

International career
2000–2001	Denmark U-17	11	(0)
2002	Denmark U-18	1	(0)
2001–2003	Denmark U-19	11	(0)
2003	Denmark U-20	3	(0)
2005–2006	Denmark U-21	6	(0)
- * Club domestic league appearances and goals

Theis Frydenlund Rasmussen (born 12 July 1984), known as Theis F. Rasmussen, is a Danish former professional footballer who played as a goalkeeper. He has played six games for the Denmark U-21 national team, and helped the team qualify for the UEFA U-21 Championship 2006.

He started his career with Danish 1st Division teams B.93 and Akademisk Boldklub. He moved to 1st Division rivals Vejle Boldklub in 2005, and helped Vejle win promotion for the Danish Superliga. When Vejle brought in experienced goalkeeper Jan Hoffmann, Rasmussen saw no more playing time, and left the club in the winter 2007. He continued his career as an amateur with BK Frem, but soon left for Superliga club FC Nordsjælland in March 2008. He left Nordsjælland in December 2008 in order to seek more playing time elsewhere. He joined 1st Division team Kolding FC in January 2009, but injuries forced him to leave the club in August 2009.
