= Karsten Johansen =

Danish footballer (born 1981)

Personal information
- Date of birth: 11 April 1981 (age 45)
- Place of birth: Denmark
- Height: 1.76 m (5 ft 9 in)
- Position: Forward

Team information
- Current team: Mern UIF

Senior career*
Years	Team	Apps	(Gls)
2001–2002	Næstved IF	97	(43)
2003–2004	Brøndby IF	23	(5)
2004–2007	Randers FC	95	(32)
2007–2010	Næstved BK	5	(3)
- Mern UIF
- * Club domestic league appearances and goals

Karsten Johansen (born 11 April 1981) is a Danish professional football forward, who currently plays for the Danish 1st Division side Næstved BK.

== Honours ==
Randers

- Danish Cup: 2005–06
