= Michaël Murcy =

French footballer (born 1979)

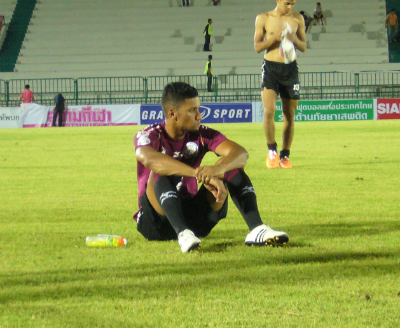
- Murcy with Police United in 2014

Personal information
- Date of birth: 18 September 1979 (age 47)
- Place of birth: Beaumont-sur-Oise, France
- Height: 1.84 m (6 ft 0 in)
- Position: Forward

Senior career*
Years	Team	Apps	(Gls)
2000–2003	Créteil	14	(0)
2003–2004	La Louvière	38	(12)
2005–2008	Esbjerg	96	(19)
2008–2010	Clermont	47	(7)
2010	Shandong Luneng	4	(1)
2011	Quevilly	17	(5)
2011–2013	Paris FC	62	(12)
2013–2014	Police United	46	(20)
2015	Chainat Hornbill	30	(9)
2015–2016	Chartres	10	(8)
Total		364	(93)
- * Club domestic league appearances and goals

Michaël Murcy (born 18 September 1979) is a French former professional footballer who played as a forward.
