= Wassim El Banna =

Danish-Palestinian footballer

Personal information
- Date of birth: 10 May 1979 (age 47)
- Place of birth: Lebanon
- Height: 1.81 m (5 ft 11 in)
- Position: Forward

Youth career
- –1989: B 1909
- 1989–1997: OB

Senior career*
Years	Team	Apps	(Gls)
1997–1999	OB	23	(8)
1999	→ Aarhus Fremad (loan)	9	(2)
1999–2000	Dalum IF		
2000–2003	Dalum IF		
2003	B 1913		
2003–2005	Dalum IF		
2005	B 1909		
2005–2007	Boldklubben Frem	59	(28)
2007–2008	Ajman Club	12	(9)
2008	Boldklubben Frem	14	(3)
2008–2009	Vejle Boldklub	10	(0)
2009	Boldklubben Frem		
2009–2010	FC Hjørring		
2010–2011	Glostrup-Albertslund		
2011	FC Svendborg		

International career
1997–1998	Denmark U19	6	(0)
1998	Denmark U20	1	(0)
- * Club domestic league appearances and goals

Wassim El Banna (Arabic: وسيم البنا; born 10 May 1979) is a former professional footballer who played as a forward. He has represented Odense Boldklub, Aarhus Fremad, and Vejle Boldklub in the Danish Superliga.
