= Andreas Klarström =

Swedish footballer

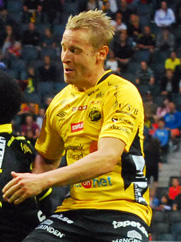

Personal information
- Full name: Frank Andréas Klarström
- Date of birth: 23 December 1977 (age 48)
- Place of birth: Borås, Sweden
- Height: 1.73 m (5 ft 8 in)
- Position: Right back

Team information
- Current team: Vårgårda IK

Senior career*
Years	Team	Apps	(Gls)
1996–2005	IF Elfsborg	162	(18)
1998	→ IK Start (loan)	6	(0)
2006–2010	Esbjerg fB	127	(1)
2010–2015	IF Elfsborg	117	(0)
2016–2017	Fristads GoIF		
2019–	Vårgårda IK		
- * Club domestic league appearances and goals as of 12 January 2016

Andreas Klarström (born 23 December 1977) is a Swedish professional football who plays as midfielder for Vårgårda IK. And who also played for IF Elfsborg

== Career ==
=== Vårgårda IK ===
On 22 August 2019 it was confirmed, that 41-year old Klarström had come out of retirement and joined Swedish second division club Vårgårda IK.
