= 2005–06 Danish Cup =

DBU Pokalen (The DBU Cup)

Tournament details
- Country: Denmark

Final positions
- Champions: Randers FC
- Runners-up: Esbjerg fB

The 2005–06 Danish Cup was the 52nd season of the Danish Cup. The first round was played on about 27 July 2005 and the final was played on 11 May 2006. This was the first time in the tournament's modern history that the final was not played on the afternoon of the Ascension Day. This was because of a new deadline for domestic competitions, enforced by FIFA.

The cup winner, Randers FC, qualified for UEFA Cup qualification.

== First round ==
In first round competed 48 teams from the "series" (2004 Denmark Series and lower) and 16 teams from 2004–05 Danish 2nd Divisions.

Team 1	Score	Team 2
26 July 2005
Humlebæk BK	0–4	Sorø IF Freja
Valby BK	2–3 (a.e.t.)	VLI
27 July 2005
Nykøbing Mors IF	0–4	Thisted FC
Hobro IK	1–2	Hjørring IF
Aalborg Freja	2–4	Kvik IF
Lindholm IF	1–4	Jetsmark IF
Skive IK	5–0	Nørresundby BK
Løgstør IF	3–7	Holstebro BK
DSIO Odense	5–1	Fraugde G&IF
Aabyhøj IF	0–1	Kolding FC
SUB Sønderborg	0–3	B 1913
Sædding/Guldager IF	5–2	Tjørring IF
Fredericia fF	0–1	Grenaa IF
Aarhus Fremad	1–5	B 1909
Sanderum BK	0–0 (a.e.t.) (3–2 p)	Svendborg fB
BMI	3–5 (a.e.t.)	Tommerup BK
FC Horsens	0–5	Brabrand IF
Tved BK	1–6	Viby IF
BK Frem Sakskøbing	1–1 (a.e.t.) (2–3 p)	Jægersborg BK
Døllefjelde-Musse IF	4–3	Ballerup IF
Frederikssund IK	1–4	Albertslund IF
Tuse IF	0–5	Kalundborg GB
BK Rødovre	0–2	Taastrup FC
FC Roskilde	0–5	Holbæk B&I
Vanløse IF	0–2	Lyngby BK
Amager FF	0–6	Slagelse B&I
Solrød FC	3–2	Øster Ulslev BK
Greve Fodbold	1–0	Hvidovre IF
28 July 2005
BK Søllerød-Vedbæk	2–1	Værløse BK
IF Skjold Birkerød	1–2	Glostrup FK
29 July 2005
Korup IF	2–1	Næsby BK
30 July 2005
Allerød FK	2–1	FC Bornholm

== Second round ==
In second round competed 32 winning teams from first round and 8 teams from 2004–05 Danish 1st Division (no. 9 to 16).

Team 1	Score	Team 2
9 August 2005
Taastrup FC	2–6	Lyngby BK
10 August 2005
Dalum IF	4–0	Jetsmark IF
Korup IF	1–3	B 1909
Sorø IF Freja	1–0	Holstebro BK
B 1913	2–0	Thisted FC
Hjørring IF	2–1	Brabrand IF
DSIO Odense	1–2	Sanderum BK
Tommerup BK	0–1	Sædding/Guldager IF
Viby IF	3–0	Grenaa IF
Kvik IF	0–3	FC Fredericia
Skive IK	0–5	Kolding FC
AB	5–0	Brønshøj BK
Jægersborg BK	0–6	Lolland-Falster Alliancen
Allerød FK	2–0	Greve Fodbold
BK Søllerød-Vedbæk	0–1	Kalundborg GB
Døllefjelde-Musse IF	1–0	Ølstykke FC
Glostrup FK	1–2	Holbæk B&I
Solrød FC	0–7	Slagelse B&I
VLI	0–2	B.93
Albertslund IF	1–5	Næstved BK

== Third round ==
In third round competed 20 winning teams from second round, 6 teams from 2004–05 Danish 1st Division (no. 3 to 8) and 2 teams from 2004–05 Danish Superliga (no. 11 and 12).

Team 1	Score	Team 2
23 August 2005
Sanderum BK	1–5	Dalum IF
Sorø IF Freja	1–3	Slagelse B&I
Døllefjelde-Musse IF	3–2	BK Skjold
24 August 2005
Holbæk B&I	1–3	Lyngby BK
Sædding/Guldager IF	0–13	Randers FC
B 1909	1–0	B 1913
BK Frem	2–1	Vejle BK
Viby IF	1–4	Hjørring IF
FC Fredericia	3–4	Kolding FC
Hellerup IK	3–0	Fremad Amager
Næstved BK	4–2	Kalundborg GB
AB	3–2	Køge BK
Allerød FK	1–4	B.93
31 August 2005
Lolland-Falster Alliancen	2–4	Herfølge BK

== Fourth round ==
In fourth round competed 14 winning teams from third round, 2 teams from 2004–05 Danish 1st Division (no. 1 and 2) and 4 teams from 2004–05 Danish Superliga (no. 7 to 10).

Team 1	Score	Team 2
14 September 2005
Dalum IF	0–1 (a.e.t.)	Silkeborg IF
Døllefjelde-Musse IF	2–5	Lyngby BK
Slagelse B&I	2–1	Hjørring IF
Næstved BK	1–3	Herfølge BK
Randers FC	2–0	AGF
SønderjyskE	1–2	AC Horsens
FC Nordsjælland	0–3	Viborg FF
BK Frem	2–1 (a.e.t.)	AB
B 1909	1–1 (a.e.t.) (3–0 p)	Hellerup IK
21 September 2005
B.93	3–5	Kolding FC

== Fifth round ==
In fifth round competed 10 winning teams from fourth round and 6 teams from 2004–05 Danish Superliga (no. 1 to 6).

Team 1	Score	Team 2
12 October 2005
Randers FC	2–0	AC Horsens
19 October 2005
Brøndby IF	2–1	Silkeborg IF
B 1909	5–2	Herfølge BK
BK Frem	2–2 (a.e.t.) (6–5 p)	Viborg FF
AaB	2–1 (a.e.t.)	FC Midtjylland
Slagelse B&I	2–2 (a.e.t.) (4–5 p)	F.C. Copenhagen
Kolding FC	1–1 (a.e.t.) (4–5 p)	Odense BK
Lyngby BK	0–0 (a.e.t.) (4–5 p)	Esbjerg fB

== Quarter-finals ==
Team 1	Score	Team 2
5 March 2006
AaB	2–2 (a.e.t.) (7–6 p)	Odense BK
Brøndby IF	1–0 (a.e.t.)	F.C. Copenhagen
12 March 2006
Randers FC	3–0	BK Frem
15 March 2006
B 1909	1–3	Esbjerg fB

== Semi-finals ==
The semi finals were played on home and away basis.

The draw took place on 6 March 2006. The legs were played on 20 and 27 April 2006.

Team 1	Agg.	Team 2	1st leg	2nd leg
Randers FC	1–1 (a)	AaB	0–0	1–1
Esbjerg fB	5–3	Brøndby IF	5–2	0–1

== Final ==
11 May 2006
19:00 CEST

Esbjerg fB	0–1 (a.e.t.)	Randers FC
		Johansen 116'

Parken Stadium, Copenhagen
Attendance: 23,825
Referee: Kim Milton Nielsen

== See also ==
- Football in Denmark
- 2005–06 in Danish football
- 2005–06 Danish Superliga
- 2005–06 Danish 1st Division
- 2005–06 Danish 2nd Divisions
