= List of Danish football transfers summer 2025 =

This is a list of Danish football transfers for the 2025 summer transfer window. Only transfers featuring Superliga and 1. Division are listed.

== Superliga ==
Note: Flags indicate national team as has been defined under FIFA eligibility rules. Players may hold more than one non-FIFA nationality.

=== Copenhagen ===
In:

| No. | Pos. | Nation | Player |
|---|---|---|---|
| 6 | DF | GRE | Pantelis Chatzidiakos (from (Italy) Cagliari, previously on loan) |
| 9 | FW | GER | Youssoufa Moukoko (from (Germany) Borussia Dortmund, previously on loan at (France) Nice) |
| 15 | DF | PER | Marcos López (from (Netherlands) Feyenoord, previously on loan) |
| 20 | DF | JPN | Junnosuke Suzuki (from (Japan) Shonan Bellmare) |
| 22 | DF | FRA | Yoram Zague (on loan from (France) Paris Saint-Germain) |
| 23 | MF | POL | Dominik Sarapata (from (Poland) Górnik Zabrze) |
| 42 | GK | CRO | Dominik Kotarski (from (Greece) PAOK) |

Out:

| No. | Pos. | Nation | Player |
|---|---|---|---|
| 1 | GK | ENG | Nathan Trott (on loan to (Wales) Cardiff City) |
| 2 | DF | IDN | Kevin Diks (to (Germany) Borussia Mönchengladbach) |
| 17 | MF | DEN | Victor Froholdt (to (Portugal) Porto) |
| 19 | FW | ALG | Amin Chiakha (on loan to Vejle) |
| 20 | DF | DEN | Nicolai Boilesen (retired) |
| 22 | DF | GEO | Giorgi Gocholeishvili (loan return to (Ukraine) Shakhtar Donetsk) |
| 28 | MF | HUN | Hunor Németh (on loan to (Hungary) MTK Budapest) |
| 33 | MF | DEN | Rasmus Falk (to OB) |
| 40 | MF | SWE | Roony Bardghji (to (Spain) Barcelona) |
| 41 | GK | GER | Diant Ramaj (loan return to (Germany) Borussia Dortmund) |
| — | GK | DEN | Theo Sander (on loan to OB, previously on loan Hvidovre) |
| — | DF | SVK | Denis Vavro (to (Germany) VfL Wolfsburg, previously on loan) |
| — | FW | NGA | Paul Mukairu (to (Poland) Pogoń Szczecin, previously on loan at (Turkey) Boluspor) |
| — | FW | FRA | Mamoudou Karamoko (to (Romania) Dinamo București, previously on loan at (Hungary) Újpest) |

=== Midtjylland ===
In:

| No. | Pos. | Nation | Player |
|---|---|---|---|
| 6 | DF | CRO | Martin Erlić (from (Italy) Bologna) |
| 90 | FW | NGA | Friday Etim (from (Portugal) Mafra) |

Out:

| No. | Pos. | Nation | Player |
|---|---|---|---|
| 6 | DF | SWE | Joel Andersson (to (Bulgaria) Ludogorets Razgrad) |
| 15 | DF | DEN | Christian Sørensen (to Vejle) |
| 24 | MF | DEN | Oliver Sørensen (to (Italy) Parma) |
| 30 | GK | ENG | Ovie Ejeheri (on loan to Fredericia) |
| — | FW | NGA | Obule Moses (to (Faroe Islands) AB Argir) |
| — | FW | CZE | Jan Kuchta (to (Czech Republic) Sparta Prague, previously on loan) |

=== Brøndby ===
In:

| No. | Pos. | Nation | Player |
|---|---|---|---|
| 2 | DF | DEN | Oliver Villadsen (from (Germany) 1. FC Nürnberg) |
| 4 | DF | ENG | Luis Binks (from (England) Coventry City) |
| 9 | FW | AUT | Michael Gregoritsch (from (Germany) SC Freiburg) |
| 18 | FW | JPN | Kōtarō Uchino (from (Japan) University of Tsukuba) |
| 19 | FW | JPN | Shō Fukuda (from (Japan) Shonan Bellmare) |
| 27 | DF | GER | Mats Köhlert (from (Netherlands) Heerenveen) |

Out:

| No. | Pos. | Nation | Player |
|---|---|---|---|
| 2 | DF | NOR | Sebastian Sebulonsen (to (Germany) 1. FC Köln) |
| 4 | DF | DEN | Jacob Rasmussen (to (Austria) Red Bull Salzburg) |
| 17 | FW | DEN | Mileta Rajović (loan return to (England) Watford) |
| 28 | FW | JPN | Yuito Suzuki (to (Germany) SC Freiburg) |
| 34 | DF | DEN | Ludwig Vraa-Jensen (to (Austria) Grazer AK) |
| 36 | FW | DEN | Mathias Kvistgaarden (to (England) Norwich City) |
| — | FW | GHA | Emmanuel Yeboah (on loan to (Sweden) Halmstad, previously on loan at Vejle) |
| — | MF | POL | Mateusz Kowalczyk (to (Poland) GKS Katowice, previously on loan) |

=== Randers ===
In:

| No. | Pos. | Nation | Player |
|---|---|---|---|
| 2 | DF | BEL | Lucas Lissens (from Lyngby) |
| 22 | GK | NED | Mert Demirci (from (Spain) Alcorcón B) |
| 32 | GK | DEN | Jannich Storch (from Lyngby) |

Out:

| No. | Pos. | Nation | Player |
|---|---|---|---|
| 9 | MF | NOR | Simen Bolkan Nordli (to (Norway) Rosenborg) |
| 15 | DF | GER | Björn Kopplin (retired) |
| 18 | FW | SYR | Noah Shamoun (on loan to (Sweden) Värnamo) |
| 22 | GK | GHA | Emmanuel Ogura (free agent) |
| 23 | DF | DEN | Christian Østergaard (to (Netherlands) Emmen) |
| 25 | GK | DEN | Oskar Snorre (to Lyngby) |

=== Nordsjælland ===
In:

| No. | Pos. | Nation | Player |
|---|---|---|---|
| 8 | MF | DEN | Nicklas Røjkjær (from (Sweden) Mjällby) |
| 9 | FW | NOR | Ola Solbakken (from (Italy) Roma, previously on loan at (Italy) Empoli) |
| 16 | GK | DEN | Jakob Busk (from Sønderjyske, previously on loan at (Germany) TSG Hoffenheim) |

Out:

| No. | Pos. | Nation | Player |
|---|---|---|---|
| 4 | DF | DEN | Kian Hansen (retired) |
| 8 | MF | CIV | Mario Dorgeles (to (Portugal) Braga) |
| 10 | FW | SWE | Benjamin Nygren (to (Scotland) Celtic) |
| 11 | FW | NOR | Gustav Wikheim (to (Norway) Strømsgodset) |
| 12 | MF | FRA | Rocco Ascone (on loan to (Sweden) Halmstad) |
| 24 | DF | DEN | Lucas Høgsberg (to (France) Strasbourg) |
| 31 | GK | USA | Duran Ferree (loan return to (United States) San Diego FC) |
| — | DF | SWE | Daniel Svensson (to (Germany) Borussia Dortmund, previously on loan) |
| — | FW | USA | Milan Iloski (to (United States) Philadelphia Union, previously on loan at (United States) San Diego FC) |

=== AGF ===
In:

| No. | Pos. | Nation | Player |
|---|---|---|---|
| 8 | MF | DEN | Sebastian Jørgensen (on loan from (Sweden) Malmö, previously on loan at (Sweden) Norrköping) |
| 29 | DF | DEN | Rasmus Carstensen (on loan from (Germany) 1. FC Köln, previously on loan at (Poland) Lech Poznań) |

Out:

| No. | Pos. | Nation | Player |
|---|---|---|---|
| 8 | MF | ISL | Mikael Anderson (to (Sweden) Djurgården) |
| 20 | MF | DEN | Mikkel Duelund (to Vejle) |
| 27 | MF | GHA | Michael Akoto (to (Iceland) KR Reykjavík) |
| 29 | MF | DEN | Frederik Brandhof (to Horsens) |
| — | DF | DEN | Aksel Halsgaard (on loan to Næstved, previously on loan at Roskilde) |
| — | FW | GHA | Richmond Gyamfi (on loan to Esbjerg, previously on loan at Hobro) |
| — | MF | DEN | Mathias Sauer (to (Norway) Egersund, previously on loan) |
| — | FW | NOR | Sigurd Haugen (to (Germany) 1860 Munich, previously on loan at (Germany) Hansa Rostock) |

=== Silkeborg ===
In:

| No. | Pos. | Nation | Player |
|---|---|---|---|
| 18 | DF | DEN | Leonel Montano (from Esbjerg) |
| 22 | MF | SWE | Rami Al Hajj (from (England) Plymouth Argyle) |

Out:

| No. | Pos. | Nation | Player |
|---|---|---|---|
| 7 | MF | KAZ | Ramazan Orazov (on loan to (Kazakhstan) Elimai) |
| 11 | MF | DEN | Fredrik Carlsen (to (Germany) FC Ingolstadt) |
| 21 | MF | DEN | Anders Klynge (to (Norway) Bodø/Glimt) |
| — | DF | DEN | Oscar Fuglsang (retired, previously on loan at Fredericia) |

=== Viborg ===
In:

| No. | Pos. | Nation | Player |
|---|---|---|---|
| 4 | MF | NED | Mees Hoedemakers (from (Netherlands) NEC) |
| 9 | FW | NED | Tim Freriks (from Esbjerg) |
| 16 | GK | MNE | Filip Đukić (from Horsens) |
| 19 | FW | EQG | Dorian Jr. (from (Spain) Marbella) |
| 27 | FW | FRA | Yonis Njoh (from (France) Pau, previously on loan) |
| 29 | FW | DEN | Sami Jalal Karchoud (from Kolding) |

Out:

| No. | Pos. | Nation | Player |
|---|---|---|---|
| 3 | DF | SWE | Elias Andersson (loan return to (Poland) Lech Poznań) |
| 7 | FW | CPV | Serginho (to (United Arab Emirates) Al Wasl) |
| 8 | FW | NGA | Ibrahim Said (to (Scotland) Motherwell) |
| 10 | FW | DEN | Isak Jensen (to (Netherlands) AZ) |
| 11 | FW | BRA | Renato Júnior (to (United Arab Emirates) Al Wasl) |
| 14 | FW | DEN | Anosike Ementa (to (Belgium) Zulte Waregem) |
| 16 | GK | DEN | Oscar Hedvall (to (Norway) Vålerenga) |
| 19 | MF | SUR | Justin Lonwijk (loan return to (Ukraine) Dynamo Kyiv) |
| — | DF | SVN | Anel Zulić (to (Slovenia) Ilirija 1911, previously on loan at (Slovenia) Koper) |
| — | MF | CUW | Nigel Thomas (to (Netherlands) ADO Den Haag, previously on loan at (Portugal) Académico de Viseu) |
| — | FW | POR | Paulinho (to (Romania) Oțelul Galați, previously on loan at (Turkey) Bandırmaspor) |

=== Sønderjyske ===
In:

| No. | Pos. | Nation | Player |
|---|---|---|---|
| 5 | DF | DEN | Magnus Jensen (from Lyngby) |
| 11 | FW | DEN | Alexander Lyng (from (Switzerland) Servette, previously on loan) |
| 19 | DF | DEN | Pachanga Kristensen (from AB) |
| 27 | GK | DEN | Benicio Peña (from Aarhus Fremad, previously on loan) |

Out:

| No. | Pos. | Nation | Player |
|---|---|---|---|
| 5 | DF | DEN | Marc Dal Hende (to AB) |
| 17 | MF | USA | Jose Gallegos (to (Bulgaria) Botev Vratsa) |
| 28 | MF | DEN | Anders Bergholt (on loan to Brønshøj) |
| 30 | DF | DEN | Gustav Wagner (on loan to Brønshøj) |
| — | GK | DEN | Jakob Busk (to Nordsjælland, previously on loan at (Germany) TSG Hoffenheim) |

=== Vejle ===
In:

| No. | Pos. | Nation | Player |
|---|---|---|---|
| 3 | DF | DEN | Christian Sørensen (from Midtjylland) |
| 4 | DF | DEN | Lasse Nielsen (from (Turkey) Göztepe) |
| 5 | DF | DEN | Valdemar Lund (on loan from (Norway) Molde) |
| 6 | MF | DEN | Mike Vestergård (from (Norway) Sarpsborg 08) |
| 10 | MF | DEN | Mikkel Duelund (from AGF) |
| 11 | FW | USA | Jonathan Amon (from Lyngby) |
| 17 | MF | DEN | Andrew Hjulsager (from (Belgium) Gent) |
| 19 | FW | DEN | Wahid Faghir (from (Germany) VfB Stuttgart II) |
| 20 | FW | GUI | Abdoulaye Camara (from (Guinea) Académie GFI) |
| 21 | DF | GEO | Giorgi Tabatadze (from (Georgia (country)) Iberia 1999) |
| 29 | FW | ALG | Amin Chiakha (on loan from Copenhagen) |
| 30 | MF | DEN | Mads Enggård (on loan from (Norway) Molde) |
| 32 | MF | GHA | Bismark Edjeodji (from (Ghana) Bechem United II) |
| 80 | MF | ROU | Alexi Pitu (from (France) Dunkerque) |

Out:

| No. | Pos. | Nation | Player |
|---|---|---|---|
| 3 | DF | CHI | Miiko Albornoz (free agent) |
| 5 | MF | GAM | Hamza Barry (free agent) |
| 7 | FW | COD | Yeni Ngbakoto (to (France) Sedan) |
| 10 | MF | DEN | Kristian Kirkegaard (to Horsens) |
| 11 | FW | GAM | Musa Juwara (to (Poland) Pogoń Szczecin) |
| 16 | DF | DEN | Andreas Tomaselli (free agent) |
| 17 | FW | GRE | Dimitrios Emmanouilidis (to (Greece) Asteras Tripolis) |
| 29 | DF | FIN | Richard Jensen (loan return to (Scotland) Aberdeen) |
| 33 | FW | GHA | Emmanuel Yeboah (loan return to Brøndby) |
| 38 | DF | CRO | David Čolina (loan return to (Germany) FC Augsburg) |
| 45 | FW | RUS | German Onugkha (loan return to Copenhagen) |
| 71 | MF | JPN | Masaki Murata (to (Azerbaijan) Sumgayit) |

=== OB ===
In:

| No. | Pos. | Nation | Player |
|---|---|---|---|
| 7 | FW | GER | Fiete Arp (from (Germany) Holstein Kiel) |
| 8 | MF | DEN | Rasmus Falk (from Copenhagen) |
| 17 | FW | GER | Noah Ganaus (from (Germany) Jahn Regensburg) |
| 30 | GK | DEN | Theo Sander (on loan from Copenhagen, previously on loan Hvidovre) |

Out:

| No. | Pos. | Nation | Player |
|---|---|---|---|
| 2 | DF | THA | Nicholas Mickelson (to (Germany) SV Elversberg) |
| 10 | FW | HAI | Louicius Don Deedson (to (United States) FC Dallas) |
| 11 | MF | DEN | Markus Jensen (on loan to (Netherlands) Jong Utrecht) |
| 17 | FW | DEN | Luca Kjerrumgaard (to (Italy) Udinese) |

=== Fredericia ===
In:

| No. | Pos. | Nation | Player |
|---|---|---|---|
| 3 | DF | DEN | Adam Nygaard (from Midtjylland U19, previously on loan) |
| 15 | DF | DEN | Malthe Ladefoged (from Næsby) |
| 18 | MF | DEN | Andreas Pyndt (on loan from (Sweden) Sirius) |
| 25 | GK | ENG | Ovie Ejeheri (on loan from Midtjylland) |

Out:

| No. | Pos. | Nation | Player |
|---|---|---|---|
| 15 | DF | DEN | Oscar Fuglsang (loan return to Silkeborg) |
| 16 | FW | DEN | Asbjørn Bøndergaard (loan return to Silkeborg) |
| 18 | DF | DEN | Jesper Juelsgård (to Horsens FS) |
| 90 | GK | DEN | Valdemar Birksø (loan return to (Norway) Fredrikstad) |

== 1. Division ==
Note: Flags indicate national team as has been defined under FIFA eligibility rules. Players may hold more than one non-FIFA nationality.

=== Lyngby ===
In:

| No. | Pos. | Nation | Player |
|---|---|---|---|
| 5 | DF | SRB | Mihajlo Ivančević (free agent) |
| 6 | MF | DEN | Bror Blume (from (Austria) WSG Tirol) |
| 7 | MF | CAN | Simon Colyn (from (Netherlands) De Graafschap) |
| 10 | FW | ISL | Ísak Þorvaldsson (on loan from (Norway) Rosenborg) |
| 21 | GK | DEN | Oskar Snorre (from Randers) |

Out:

| No. | Pos. | Nation | Player |
|---|---|---|---|
| 5 | DF | BEL | Lucas Lissens (to Randers) |
| 6 | DF | DEN | Rasmus Thelander (to (Cyprus) Omonia Aradippou) |
| 12 | DF | DEN | Magnus Jensen (to Sønderjyske) |
| 15 | FW | DEN | Michael Opoku (to (Norway) Sarpsborg 08) |
| 17 | FW | USA | Jonathan Amon (to Vejle) |
| 20 | DF | RUS | Leon Klassen (to (Germany) Darmstadt 98) |
| 21 | FW | ISL | Sævar Atli Magnússon (to (Norway) Brann) |
| 23 | DF | SWE | Adam Andersson (free agent) |
| 27 | FW | DEN | Adam Vendelbo (on loan to Vendsyssel) |
| 31 | GK | GER | Jonas Krumrey (loan return to (Austria) Red Bull Salzburg) |
| 32 | GK | DEN | Jannich Storch (to Randers) |

=== AaB ===
In:

| No. | Pos. | Nation | Player |
|---|---|---|---|
| 2 | DF | DEN | Mikkel Kallesøe (from Horsens) |
| 8 | MF | NOR | Alexander Håpnes (from (Norway) Moss) |
| 15 | DF | DEN | Cornelius Olsson (from Copenhagen U19, previously on loan at (Italy) Torino Primavera) |
| 18 | MF | DEN | Andreas Maarup (from Roskilde) |
| 25 | MF | DEN | Frederik Børsting (from Vendsyssel) |

Out:

| No. | Pos. | Nation | Player |
|---|---|---|---|
| 2 | DF | SEN | Oumar Diakhité (free agent) |
| 4 | DF | NED | Lars Kramer (to (Romania) Rapid București) |
| 6 | MF | NED | Mylian Jimenez (to (Netherlands) ADO Den Haag) |
| 8 | MF | SWE | Melker Widell (loan return to (Wales) Swansea City) |
| 11 | FW | DEN | Mathias Jørgensen (to (Norway) Bodø/Glimt) |
| 14 | DF | DEN | Andreas Bruus (loan return to (France) Troyes) |
| 16 | MF | DEN | Kasper Davidsen (to (Germany) Holstein Kiel) |
| 20 | DF | DEN | Kasper Jørgensen (to (Austria) LASK) |
| 23 | MF | NOR | Isak Hansen-Aarøen (loan return to (Germany) Werder Bremen) |
| 26 | MF | NOR | Travis Hernes (loan return to (England) Newcastle United) |

=== Horsens ===
In:

| No. | Pos. | Nation | Player |
|---|---|---|---|
| 7 | DF | BIH | Ivan Milićević (from (Hungary) Fehérvár) |
| 10 | MF | DEN | Kristian Kirkegaard (from Vejle) |
| 22 | FW | GHA | John Batigi (from (Bulgaria) Botev Plovdiv) |
| 25 | FW | SEN | Fallou Sene (from (Italy) Fiorentina Primavera, previously on loan at (Italy) Frosinone) |
| 29 | MF | DEN | Frederik Brandhof (from AGF) |
| 32 | MF | DEN | Patrick Olsen (from (Romania) Dinamo București) |

Out:

| No. | Pos. | Nation | Player |
|---|---|---|---|
| 8 | MF | CIV | Odilon Kouassi (on loan to (France) Versailles) |
| 10 | MF | DEN | Sanders Ngabo (to (Sweden) Häcken) |
| 15 | MF | DEN | Oliver Kjærgaard (to Hvidovre) |
| 18 | MF | DEN | Frederik Juul Christensen (to (Norway) Kongsvinger) |
| 21 | FW | GHA | Kwaku Karikari (on loan to (Serbia) Železničar Pančevo) |
| 22 | FW | DEN | Emil Frederiksen (loan return to (Norway) Rosenborg) |
| 23 | GK | MNE | Filip Đukić (to Viborg) |
| 25 | DF | DEN | Mikkel Kallesøe (to AaB) |
| 26 | FW | ISL | Galdur Gudmundsson (to (Iceland) KR Reykjavík) |
| 45 | FW | AUT | Marvin Egho (to Hvidovre) |
| — | MF | DEN | Hjalte Toftegaard (to Hillerød) |
| — | DF | DEN | Samuel Juel (to Skive, previously on loan) |
| — | FW | USA | Simon Becher (to (United States) St. Louis City, previously on loan) |
| — | FW | DEN | Angelo Nehmé (to (Sweden) Trelleborg, previously on loan at Næstved) |
| — | FW | NZL | Elijah Just (to (Scotland) Motherwell, previously on loan at (Austria) St. Pölten) |

=== Kolding ===
In:

| No. | Pos. | Nation | Player |
|---|---|---|---|
| 6 | DF | MNE | Nemanja Nedic (from (Poland) GKS Tychy) |
| 8 | MF | ESP | Jesús Alfaro (from (Poland) Wisła Kraków) |
| 15 | MF | ISL | Jóhannes Kristinn Bjarnason (from (Iceland) KR Reykjavík) |
| 21 | DF | DEN | Magnus Døj (from Holbæk B&I) |
| 28 | GK | SVK | Adam Danko (from (Slovakia) Podbrezová) |
| 30 | DF | GER | Eric Voufack (from (Germany) Rot-Weiss Essen) |

Out:

| No. | Pos. | Nation | Player |
|---|---|---|---|
| 6 | MF | DEN | Sebastian Sommer (retired) |
| 7 | FW | DEN | Sami Jalal Karchoud (to Viborg) |
| 8 | MF | NOR | Mats Pedersen (to (Norway) HamKam) |
| 13 | DF | DEN | Malthe Bøndergaard (to Skive) |
| 15 | FW | DEN | Joachim Rothmann (retired) |
| 16 | DF | DEN | Mads Bager (to Vendsyssel) |
| 30 | DF | DEN | Luka Callø (loan return to AGF) |
| 33 | MF | NGA | Jamiu Musbaudeen (loan return to (Portugal) Mafra) |

=== Hvidovre ===
In:

| No. | Pos. | Nation | Player |
|---|---|---|---|
| 1 | GK | DEN | Marco Brylov (from Nykøbing) |
| 6 | MF | DEN | Ayo Simon Okosun (from Vendsyssel) |
| 14 | MF | DEN | Oliver Kjærgaard (from Horsens) |
| 20 | FW | DEN | Sebastian Koch (from B.93) |
| 45 | FW | AUT | Marvin Egho (from Horsens) |

Out:

| No. | Pos. | Nation | Player |
|---|---|---|---|
| 1 | GK | DEN | Theo Sander (loan return to Copenhagen) |
| 6 | MF | DEN | Jonas Gemmer (to (Iceland) ÍA) |
| 14 | MF | DEN | Christian Jakobsen (to (Iceland) Þór Akureyri) |
| 21 | DF | DEN | Benjamin Meibom (to Holbæk B&I) |
| 24 | FW | DEN | Simon Makienok (free agent) |
| 27 | FW | DEN | Mathias Andreasen (to Næstved) |

=== Esbjerg ===
In:

| No. | Pos. | Nation | Player |
|---|---|---|---|
| 10 | FW | GHA | Richmond Gyamfi (on loan from AGF, previously on loan at Hobro) |
| 17 | MF | DEN | Julius Beck (from (Italy) Spezia, previously on loan) |
| 19 | DF | NOR | Sander Eng Strand (from (Norway) Åsane) |
| 80 | FW | DEN | Muamer Brajanac (from (Norway) Vålerenga) |

Out:

| No. | Pos. | Nation | Player |
|---|---|---|---|
| 10 | MF | COM | Yacine Bourhane (to (Cyprus) Aris Limassol) |
| 14 | FW | NED | Tim Freriks (to Viborg) |
| 17 | MF | DEN | Julius Beck (to (Austria) Sturm Graz) |
| 19 | MF | DEN | Bertram Kvist (to Næstved) |
| 21 | DF | DEN | Leonel Montano (to Silkeborg) |
| 25 | DF | DEN | Johan Meyer (loan return to Lyngby) |

=== Hillerød ===
In:

| No. | Pos. | Nation | Player |
|---|---|---|---|
| 10 | FW | FRO | Poul Kallsberg (from (Faroe Islands) Víkingur) |
| 11 | MF | DEN | Mikkel Mouritz (from B.93) |
| 16 | MF | DEN | Hjalte Toftegaard (from Horsens) |
| 26 | GK | DEN | Andreas Dithmer (from (Netherlands) Jong Utrecht) |
| 27 | DF | DEN | Victor Dedes (from HIK) |

Out:

| No. | Pos. | Nation | Player |
|---|---|---|---|
| 10 | MF | DEN | Markus Bay (to Fremad Amager) |
| 11 | DF | DEN | Pierre Larsen (to Brønshøj) |
| 16 | MF | DEN | Tobias Koktvedgaard (to (Faroe Islands) B71) |
| 26 | GK | DEN | Viggo Andersen (free agent) |
| 27 | DF | FRO | Daniel Johansen (to (Faroe Islands) Klaksvík) |

=== Hobro ===
In:

| No. | Pos. | Nation | Player |
|---|---|---|---|
| 15 | DF | DEN | Gustav Bjerge (on loan from Midtjylland U19) |

Out:

| No. | Pos. | Nation | Player |
|---|---|---|---|
| 19 | FW | GHA | Richmond Gyamfi (loan return to AGF) |
| 28 | DF | DEN | Tobias Lennert (to Vorup FB) |
| 29 | DF | DEN | Laurits Nørby (to (Iceland) Fjölnir) |

=== B.93 ===
In:

| No. | Pos. | Nation | Player |
|---|---|---|---|
| 8 | FW | LVA | Kristaps Grabovskis (from (Austria) Rapid Wien II, previously on loan at (Latvia) Metta) |
| 14 | FW | DEN | Adam Ahmad (from Vendsyssel) |
| 22 | MF | NOR | Oliver Thomassen (free agent) |
| 28 | FW | DEN | Roni Arabaci (from Roskilde) |

Out:

| No. | Pos. | Nation | Player |
|---|---|---|---|
| 5 | DF | DEN | Jacob Egeris (free agent) |
| 7 | FW | PLE | Ahmed Daghim (free agent) |
| 8 | MF | DEN | Mikkel Mouritz (to Hillerød) |
| 11 | FW | DEN | Emeka Nnamani (to (Sweden) Kalmar) |
| 13 | GK | PHI | Michael Falkesgaard (to (Philippines) Port) |
| 17 | FW | DEN | Ole Jakobsen (to Nykøbing) |
| 29 | FW | DEN | Sebastian Koch (to Hvidovre) |
| — | DF | DEN | Ruben Minerba (to FA 2000, previously on loan) |
| — | FW | DEN | Magnus Bøttker (to Nykøbing, previously on loan) |
| — | FW | DEN | Jonathan Mathys (to AB, previously on loan at Frem) |

=== Køge ===
In:

| No. | Pos. | Nation | Player |
|---|---|---|---|
| 2 | DF | DEN | Laurits Bust (from Næstved) |
| 6 | DF | DEN | Rasmus Brodersen (from AB) |

Out:

| No. | Pos. | Nation | Player |
|---|---|---|---|
| 4 | DF | DEN | Hans Christian Bonnesen (to (Norway) Odd) |
| 6 | MF | NED | Michael Chacón (free agent) |
| 24 | MF | DEN | Javany Lawrence (to HIK) |
| 26 | FW | CUW | Jafar Arias (free agent) |

=== Aarhus Fremad ===
In:

| No. | Pos. | Nation | Player |
|---|---|---|---|
| 2 | DF | DEN | Malthe Kjølby (from AaB U19) |
| 7 | FW | DEN | Magnus Kaastrup (from Vendsyssel) |
| 9 | FW | DEN | Kasper Andersen (from Fremad Amager) |
| 30 | GK | DEN | Viktor Højbjerg (from FA 2000) |

Out:

| No. | Pos. | Nation | Player |
|---|---|---|---|
| 2 | DF | DEN | Emil Junge (to VSK Aarhus) |
| 7 | MF | DEN | Julius Fechtenburg (to Næsby) |
| 9 | FW | DEN | Thomas Mikkelsen (retired) |
| 15 | DF | DEN | Jacob Torp (to Brabrand) |
| 18 | MF | ARM | Gabriel Papyan (to VSK Aarhus) |
| 30 | GK | DEN | Casper Andersen (to Fremad Amager) |
| 34 | MF | DEN | Sebastian Denius (free agent) |
| — | GK | DEN | Benicio Peña (to Sønderjyske, previously on loan) |

=== Middelfart ===
In:

| No. | Pos. | Nation | Player |
|---|---|---|---|
| 2 | DF | DEN | Søren Reese (from Fremad Amager) |
| 10 | FW | FRA | Aaron Akalé (from (Switzerland) Basel U21) |
| 14 | DF | DEN | Noah Barholt (from OB U19, previously on loan) |
| 15 | FW | DEN | Mikkel Søfeldt (from Horsens U19) |
| 16 | GK | DEN | Albert Gaub-Jakobsen (from AB) |
| 18 | DF | NED | Jerailly Wielzen (from Fremad Amager) |
| 88 | GK | DEN | William Nyborg (from Lyseng U19) |

Out:

| No. | Pos. | Nation | Player |

== See also ==
- 2025–26 Danish Superliga
- 2025–26 Danish 1st Division
