= 2024–25 Danish 1st Division =

85th season of Danish 1st Division

NordicBet Liga
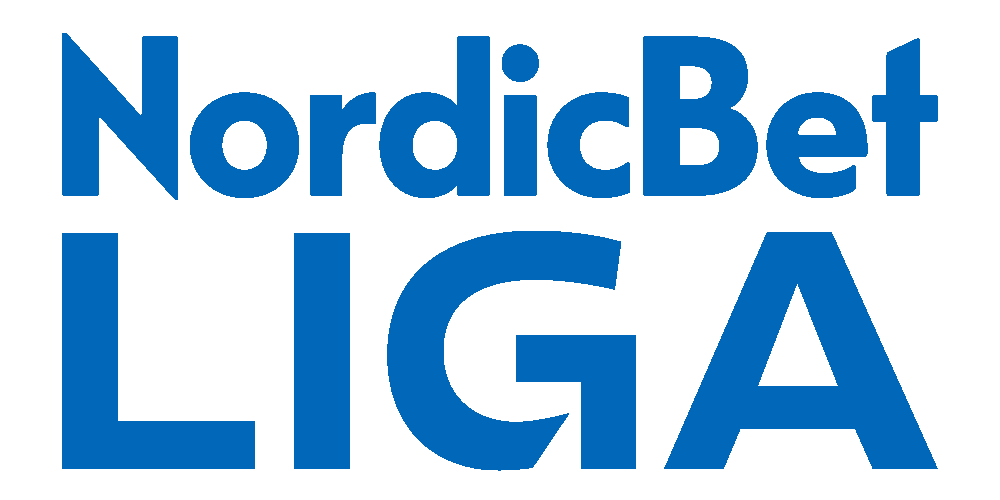
- Season: 2024–25
- Champions: OB (4th title)
- Promoted: OB; FC Fredericia
- Relegated: Roskilde; Vendsyssel FF
- Matches: 192
- Goals: 489 (2.55 per match)
- Top goalscorer: Luca Kjerrumgaard (18 goals)
- Biggest home win: B.93 5–0 Hobro (25 April 2025)
- Biggest away win: Esbjerg 0–6 OB (11 April 2025)
- Highest scoring: Hobro 3–6 Esbjerg (26 July 2024)
- All statistics correct as of 5 May 2025.

The 2024–25 Danish 1st Division (known as the NordicBet Liga due to sponsorship by NordicBet) marked the 29th season of the league operating as the second tier of Danish football and the 85th season overall under the 1st Division name. The league is governed by the Danish Football Association (DBU).

== Participants ==
OB and Hvidovre IF finished the 2023–24 season of the Superliga in 11th and 12th place, respectively, and were relegated to the 1st Division. They replaced SønderjyskE and AaB, who were promoted to the 2024–25 Danish Superliga.

Esbjerg fB and FC Roskilde won promotion from the 2023–24 Danish 2nd Division. They replaced Næstved BK and FC Helsingør who were relegated to the 2024–25 Danish 2nd Division.

=== Stadia and locations ===
Locations of the 2024–25 Danish 1st Division teams.
Copenhagen: Hvidovre IF and B.93

Club	Location	Stadium	Turf	Capacity	2023–24 position
Esbjerg fB	Esbjerg	Blue Water Arena	Natural	18,000	1st in 2D
FC Fredericia	Fredericia	Monjasa Park	Natural	6,000	5th
Hillerød Fodbold	Hillerød	Right to Dream Park, Farum	Artificial	9,900	7th
Hobro IK	Hobro	DS Arena	Natural	10,700	4th
AC Horsens	Horsens	CASA Arena Horsens	Natural	10,400	8th
Hvidovre IF	Hvidovre	Hvidovre Stadion	Natural	12,000	12th in SL
Kolding IF	Kolding	Autocentralen Park	Natural	10,000	3rd
HB Køge	Herfølge/Køge	Capelli Sport Stadion	Artificial	4,000	10th
OB	Odense	Nature Energy Park	Natural	15,633	11th in SL
FC Roskilde	Roskilde	Roskilde Idrætspark	Natural	6,000	2nd in 2D
Vendsyssel FF	Hjørring	Hjørring Stadion	Natural	7,500	6th
B.93	Copenhagen	Østerbro Stadium (2024); Sundby Idrætspark (2025)	Natural; Artificial	7,000; 7,200	9th

=== Personnel and sponsoring ===
Note: Flags indicate national team as has been defined under FIFA eligibility rules. Players and Managers may hold more than one non-FIFA nationality.

Team	Head coach	Captain	Kit manufacturer	Shirt sponsor
AC Horsens	(Denmark) David Nielsen	(Croatia) Matej Delac	Hummel	NG ZINK A/S
B.93	(Denmark) Kasper Lorentzen	(Denmark) Mikkel Mouritz Jensen	Adidas	Sparekassen Danmark
Esbjerg fB	(Denmark) Lars Lungi Sørensen	(Denmark) Jonas Mortensen	Hummel	VIKING
FC Fredericia	(Denmark) Michael Hansen	(Denmark) Christian Ege Nielsen	Hummel	Monjasa
FC Roskilde	(Denmark) Kristoffer Johannsen	(Denmark) Nicklas Halse	Puma	CAT The Rental
HB Køge	(Denmark) Nicklas Pedersen	(Denmark) Mike Jensen	Capelli	Castus
Hillerød Fodbold	(Denmark) Christian Lønstrup	(Denmark) Jonathan Witt	Adidas	Dansk Varme Service
Hobro IK	(Denmark) Martin Thomsen	(Denmark) Jonas Damborg	Puma	DS Gruppen, Spar Nord
Hvidovre	(Denmark) Per Frandsen	(Denmark) Daniel Stenderup	Uhlsport	KBS Byg
Kolding IF	(Spain) Albert Rudé	(Denmark) Sebastian Sommer	Hummel	Mos Mosh
OB	(Denmark) Søren Krogh	(Denmark) Bashkim Kadrii	Hummel	Albani
Vendsyssel FF	(Denmark) Mads Kristensen	(Denmark) Mikkel Wohlgemuth	Select	Nordjyske Bank

=== Managerial changes ===
Team	Outgoing manager	Manner of departure	Date of vacancy	Replaced by	Date of appointment	Position in table
Kolding IF	(Denmark) Kristoffer Wichmann	Signed by Union Berlin	26 June 2024	(Denmark) Lasse Holmgaard	27 June 2024	Pre-season
AC Horsens	(Denmark) Claus Troelsen	End of tenure as caretaker	30 June 2024	(Denmark) Martin Retov	1 July 2024	Pre-season
Vendsyssel FF	(Denmark) Bo Zinck	Sacked	29 September 2024	(Denmark) Mads Kristensen	28 October 2024	10th
FC Roskilde	(Denmark) Mikkel Thygesen	Resigned	10 October 2024	(Denmark) Anders Theil (caretaker)	10 October 2024	12th
Kolding IF	(Denmark) Lasse Holmgaard	Sacked	30 November 2024	(Spain) Albert Rudé	6 January 2025	6th
B.93	(Denmark) Kim Engstrøm	Sacked	6 December 2024	(Denmark) Kasper Lorentzen	6 December 2024	10th
FC Roskilde	(Denmark) Anders Theil	End of tenure as caretaker	31 December 2024	(Denmark) Kristoffer Johannsen	1 January 2025	12th
AC Horsens	(Denmark) Martin Retov	Sacked	1 March 2025	(Denmark) David Nielsen	1 March 2025	4th

== League table ==
Pos	Team	Pld	W	D	L	GF	GA	GD	Pts	Promotion or Relegation
1	OB	22	14	7	1	48	22	+26	49	Advances to Promotion Group
2	FC Fredericia	22	13	1	8	44	26	+18	40	Advances to Promotion Group
3	AC Horsens	22	12	4	6	38	29	+9	40	Advances to Promotion Group
4	Hvidovre	22	10	6	6	25	19	+6	36	Advances to Promotion Group
5	Kolding	22	9	7	6	21	13	+8	34	Advances to Promotion Group
6	Esbjerg fB	22	11	1	10	40	35	+5	34	Advances to Promotion Group
7	Hillerød	22	8	8	6	34	28	+6	32	Advances to Relegation Group
8	Hobro	22	7	5	10	30	38	−8	26	Advances to Relegation Group
9	B.93	22	6	5	11	25	43	−18	23	Advances to Relegation Group
10	HB Køge	22	6	4	12	25	41	−16	22	Advances to Relegation Group
11	Vendsyssel	22	5	5	12	25	37	−12	20	Advances to Relegation Group
12	FC Roskilde	22	4	1	17	19	43	−24	13	Advances to Relegation Group

Source: Danish FA
Rules for classification: 1) points; 2) goal difference; 3) number of goals scored

== Promotion Group ==
The top 6 teams will compete for 2 spots in the 2025–26 Danish Superliga. Points and goals carried over in full from the regular season.

Pos	Team	Pld	W	D	L	GF	GA	GD	Pts	Qualification or relegation	ODE	FRE	ACH	KOL	HVI	EFB
1	OB (C, P)	32	18	11	3	69	35	+34	65	Promotion to Danish Superliga	—	1–1	1–0	4–3	1–1	4–2
2	FC Fredericia (P)	32	20	4	8	65	30	+35	64	Promotion to Danish Superliga	1–0	—	5–1	2–0	5–1	1–1
3	AC Horsens	32	15	6	11	49	48	+1	51		2–2	0–3	—	2–3	1–0	3–2
4	Kolding	32	14	8	10	36	28	+8	50		1–1	0–1	2–0	—	1–3	2–1
5	Hvidovre	32	12	9	11	33	35	−2	45		2–1	0–0	1–1	0–1	—	0–3
6	Esbjerg fB	32	13	2	17	52	56	−4	41		0–6	0–2	0–1	1–2	2–0	—

Legend: Blue = home team win; Yellow = draw; Red = away team win.
Rules for classification: 1) Points; 2) Goal difference; 3) Goals scored; 4) Away goals scored; 5) Play-off (played on neutral ground if determining teams for different rounds); 6) Draw.
(C) Champions; (P) Promoted

== Relegation Group ==
The bottom 6 teams will compete to avoid the 2 relegations to the 2025–26 Danish 2nd Division. Points and goals carried over in full from the regular season.

Pos	Team	Pld	W	D	L	GF	GA	GD	Pts	Qualification or relegation	HIL	HOB	B93	HBK	VEN	ROS
1	Hillerød	32	14	10	8	56	38	+18	52		—	2–0	5–2	3–0	3–1	5–2
2	Hobro	32	10	9	13	39	51	−12	39		0–0	—	0–0	2–1	3–1	1–1
3	B.93	32	9	8	15	42	61	−19	35		1–0	5–0	—	2–2	2–2	0–2
4	HB Køge	32	9	7	16	36	57	−21	34		0–2	0–2	2–1	—	0–0	4–3
5	Vendsyssel (R)	32	7	9	16	35	49	−14	30	Relegation to 2nd Division	0–0	2–0	3–1	0–0	—	0–0
6	FC Roskilde (R)	32	7	5	20	37	61	−24	26	Relegation to 2nd Division	4–2	1–1	2–3	1–1	2–1	—

Legend: Blue = home team win; Yellow = draw; Red = away team win.
Rules for classification: 1) Points; 2) Goal difference; 3) Goals scored; 4) Away goals scored; 5) Play-off (played on neutral ground if determining teams for different rounds); 6) Draw.
(R) Relegated

== Attendances ==
#	Club	Average
1	OB	7,618
2	Esbjerg	3,530
3	Kolding	2,472
4	Horsens	2,170
5	Fredericia	1,794
6	Hvidovre	1,502
7	B.93	1,365
8	Køge	1,333
9	Vendsyssel	1,004
10	Roskilde	969
11	Hobro	875
12	Hillerød	522
