= Jacob Dehn Andersen =

Danish footballer (born 1995)

Personal information
- Full name: Jacob Dehn Andersen
- Date of birth: August 4, 1995 (age 31)
- Place of birth: Randers, Denmark
- Height: 1.86 m (6 ft 1 in)
- Position: Centre-back

Youth career
- Skovbakken
- Randers Freja

Senior career*
Years	Team	Apps	(Gls)
2012–2015	Randers	9	(0)
2015–2016	Vejle	27	(0)
2016–2020	Viborg	31	(2)
2020–2021	Skive	43	(0)

International career
2010–2011	Denmark U16	5	(0)
2011–2013	Denmark U17	12	(2)
2012–2013	Denmark U18	4	(0)
2013–2014	Denmark U19	15	(0)
2013	Denmark U20	4	(0)

Managerial career
- 2021–2022: AGF (U-15 assistant)
- 2022–2024: Skive (assistant)
- 2024–2025: Kolding (assistant)
- 2024–2025: Kolding (caretaker)
- 2025–2026: Horsens (assistant)
- * Club domestic league appearances and goals

Jacob Dehn Andersen (born 4 August 1995) is a Danish retired professional footballer who played as a centre-back.

== Club career ==
=== Randers ===
Dehn debuted for Randers FC at the age of 16 on 27 April 2012 against Viborg FF. He was also on a trial at Celtic earlier in his youth career. He signed a 3-year old professional contract and was promoted to the first team squad at the age of only 16.

Dehn was a very talented player and went on a trial at Wolverhampton Wanderers in March 2015, without earning any contract. He announced in June 2015, that he wouldn't continue at the club for the next season.

=== Vejle Boldklub ===
On 3 July 2015 it was confirmed, that Dehn had signed a 1.5-year contract with Vejle Boldklub. He played his first match for Vejle against FC Fredericia on 26 July 2015, which ended 1-1.

In July 2016, he was on a one-week trial at Falkenbergs FF, however, he didn't get any contract. Dehn wanted to start a new chapter in another club and Vejle announced in July 2016, that they had terminated his contract.

=== Viborg ===
After a successful trial at Viborg FF, he signed a two-year contract with the club on 18 July 2016.

Dehn failed to become a regular part of the squad in the first season, with only three league matches played.

=== Skive ===
On 31 January 2020, Dehn joined Danish 1st Division club Skive IK.

== Retirement and coaching career ==
After 1,5 years at Skive IK, 25-year old Dehn announced his retirement on 28 May 2021 and revealed, that he would continue as an assistant coach for AGF's U-15 squad. On 18 July 2022, Dehn was hired as assistant coach of his former club Skive IK.

On July 2, 2024, Dehn moved to Kolding IF where he was employed as assistant and transition coach under manager Lasse Holmgaard. On November 30, 2024, Kolding fired coach Holmgaard and Dehn was appointed interim head coach. He continued in his previous position, after Albert Rudé was appointed manager on January 6, 2025.

On 6 June 2025, Dehn joined AC Horsens as part of the club's first-team staff. On 3 February 2026, AC Horsens and Dehn mutually agreed to terminate his contract with the club.
