= 2025–26 Danish 1st Division =

85th season of Danish 1st Division

Betinia Liga
- Season: 2025–26
- Dates: 18 July 2025 – 31 May 2026
- Champions: Lyngby (3rd title)
- Promoted: Lyngby; AC Horsens
- Relegated: B.93; Middelfart
- Matches: 192
- Goals: 538 (2.8 per match)
- Top goalscorer: Frederik Gytkjær; Adrian Justinussen (12 goals each)
- Biggest home win: Lyngby 5–0 Esbjerg fB (24 April 2026); Aarhus Fremad 5–0 AaB (22 May 2026)
- Biggest away win: Middelfart 0–6 Hobro (18 April 2026)
- Highest scoring: Middelfart 2–5 AaB (4 April 2026)
- All statistics correct as of 6 June 2026.

The 2025–26 Danish 1st Division marked the 30th season of the league operating as the second tier of Danish football and the 86th season overall under the 1st Division name. The league is governed by the Danish Football Association (DBU). For the first time, the 1st Division changed its name to the BetiniaLiga after NordicBet's sponsorship ended in 2024–25.

== Participants ==
AaB and Lyngby finished the 2024–25 season of the Superliga in 11th and 12th place, respectively, and were relegated to the 1st Division. They replaced OB and FC Fredericia, who were promoted to the 2025–26 Danish Superliga.

Aarhus Fremad and Middelfart G&BK won promotion from the 2024–25 Danish 2nd Division. They replaced Vendsyssel FF and FC Roskilde who were relegated to the 2025–26 Danish 2nd Division.

=== Stadia and locations ===
Locations of the 2024–25 Danish 1st Division teams.
Copenhagen: Hvidovre IF, B.93 and Lyngby

Club	Location	Stadium	Turf	Capacity	2024–25 position
AaB	Aalborg	Aalborg Portland Park	Natural	13,997	12th in SL
Aarhus Fremad	Aarhus	Riisvangen Stadium	Natural	5,000	1st in 2D
AC Horsens	Horsens	Nordstern Arena Horsens	Natural	10,400	3rd
B.93	Copenhagen	Sundby Idrætspark (2025-?); Østerbro Stadium (2026?)	Artificial; Natural	7,200; 7,000	9th
Esbjerg fB	Esbjerg	Blue Water Arena	Natural	18,000	6th
Hillerød Fodbold	Hillerød	Helsingør Stadion	Natural	4,500	7th
Hobro IK	Hobro	DS Arena	Natural	10,700	8th
Hvidovre IF	Hvidovre	Hvidovre Stadion	Natural	12,000	5th
Kolding IF	Kolding	Autocentralen Park	Natural	10,000	4th
HB Køge	Herfølge/Køge	Capelli Sport Stadion	Artificial	4,000	10th
Lyngby	Kongens Lyngby	Lyngby Stadium	Natural	10,100	11th in SL
Middelfart G&BK	Middelfart	Middelfart Stadion	Natural	4,100	2nd in 2D

=== Personnel and sponsoring ===
Note: Flags indicate national team as has been defined under FIFA eligibility rules. Players and Managers may hold more than one non-FIFA nationality.

Team	Head coach	Captain	Kit manufacturer	Shirt sponsor
AaB	(Denmark) Steffen Højer	(Denmark) Benjamin Tiedemann	Macron	Arbejdernes Landsbank
Aarhus Fremad	(Denmark) Morten Dahm Kjærgaard	(Denmark) Marcus Kirchheiner	Berri	Faxe Kondi
AC Horsens	(Denmark) Niki Zimling	(Croatia) Matej Delac	Hummel	NG ZINK A/S
B.93	(Denmark) Kasper Lorentzen	(Denmark) Andreas Heimer	Adidas	Sparekassen Danmark
Esbjerg fB	(Denmark) Sancheev Manoharan	(Denmark) Lasse Vigen	Hummel	VIKING
HB Køge	(Denmark) Nicklas Pedersen	(Denmark) Mike Jensen	Capelli	Castus
Hillerød Fodbold	(Denmark) Christian Lønstrup	(Denmark) Jonathan Witt	Adidas	Dansk Varme Service
Hobro IK	(Denmark) Jens Gjesing	(Denmark) Emil Søgaard	Puma	DS Gruppen, Spar Nord
Hvidovre	(Denmark) Martin Retov	(Denmark) Daniel Stenderup	Uhlsport	KBS Byg
Kolding IF	(Denmark) Jonas Kamper	(Denmark) Albert Nørager	Hummel	Mos Mosh
Lyngby	(Denmark) Andreas Bjelland (Denmark) Mikkel Jespersen	(Denmark) Mathias Hebo	Select	Carl Ras, Airtox
Middelfart	(Denmark) Kristoffer Johannsen	(Denmark) Lasse Thomsen	Puma	5e Byg

=== Managerial changes ===
Team	Outgoing manager	Manner of departure	Date of vacancy	Position in table	Replaced by	Date of appointment
AaB	(Denmark) Kristoffer Wichmann	Sacked	26 May 2025	Pre-season	(Denmark) Bo Zinck (caretaker)	19 June 2025
Esbjerg fB	(Denmark) Lars Lungi Sørensen	Resigned	30 June 2025	Pre-season	(Denmark) Sancheev Manoharan	1 July 2025
Hvidovre IF	(Denmark) Per Frandsen	Mutual consent	30 June 2025	Pre-season	(Denmark) Martin Retov	1 July 2025
Hobro IK	(Denmark) Martin Thomsen	Signed by Viborg FF as Assistant	28 July 2025	12th	(Denmark) Jens Gjesing	11 August 2025
AaB	(Denmark) Bo Zinck (caretaker)	End of caretaker spell	29 July 2025	9th	(Denmark) Steffen Højer	29 July 2025
Lyngby	(Denmark) Morten Karlsen	Sacked	2 September 2025	5th	(Denmark) Andreas Bjelland & Mikkel Jespersen	24 December 2025
Middelfart	(Denmark) Kim Engstrøm	Signed by Vendsyssel FF	6 January 2026	12th	(Denmark) Kristoffer Johannsen	12 January 2026
AC Horsens	(Denmark) David Nielsen	Resigned	10 March 2026	5th	(Denmark) Mads Kristensen (caretaker)	10 March 2026
Kolding IF	(Spain) Albert Rudé	Mutual consent	24 March 2026	5th	(Denmark) Jonas Kamper	26 March 2026
AC Horsens	(Denmark) Mads Kristensen (caretaker)	End of caretaker spell	15 April 2026	6th	(Denmark) Niki Zimling	15 April 2026

== Regular season ==
=== League table ===
Pos	Team	Pld	W	D	L	GF	GA	GD	Pts	Promotion or Relegation
1	Lyngby	22	12	6	4	49	25	+24	42	Advances to Promotion Group
2	Hvidovre	22	10	9	3	34	23	+11	39	Advances to Promotion Group
3	Hillerød	22	10	7	5	33	29	+4	37	Advances to Promotion Group
4	Esbjerg fB	22	11	4	7	32	29	+3	37	Advances to Promotion Group
5	Kolding	22	9	6	7	29	23	+6	33	Advances to Promotion Group
6	AC Horsens	22	8	6	8	26	24	+2	30	Advances to Promotion Group
7	AaB	22	7	7	8	33	31	+2	28	Advances to Relegation Group
8	B.93	22	8	4	10	22	36	−14	28	Advances to Relegation Group
9	Aarhus Fremad	22	6	9	7	32	27	+5	27	Advances to Relegation Group
10	Hobro	22	6	7	9	21	30	−9	25	Advances to Relegation Group
11	HB Køge	22	5	5	12	26	41	−15	20	Advances to Relegation Group
12	Middelfart BK	22	2	6	14	21	44	−23	12	Advances to Relegation Group

Updated to match(es) played on completed. Source: Betinia LIGA
Rules for classification: 1) Points; 2) Goal difference; 3) Number of goals scored

=== Results ===
Home \ Away	AAB	AAF	ACH	B93	EFB	HBK	HIL	HOB	HVI	KOL	LYN	MID
AaB		0–1	0–2	3–0	1–1	2–1	3–3	1–1	4–0	0–3	3–2	4–0
Aarhus Fremad	5–1		0–0	1–2	0–1	2–2	3–1	3–0	0–0	2–2	0–2	4–1
AC Horsens	0–0	0–0		1–2	1–0	2–3	3–1	3–3	0–4	2–1	1–3	2–0
B.93	2–2	1–3	1–0		1–5	2–0	0–2	0–1	1–3	0–1	0–3	1–0
Esbjerg fB	1–0	1–1	2–1	3–2		3–2	2–2	1–1	2–0	0–2	0–2	4–2
HB Køge	0–2	2–1	1–0	0–1	0–1		1–1	2–0	0–2	2–1	3–3	1–2
Hillerød	2–2	1–0	2–1	0–1	3–0	3–1		0–2	1–1	1–1	1–0	2–1
Hobro	1–0	2–0	0–1	1–4	2–0	1–1	1–2		0–1	2–2	1–4	0–0
Hvidovre	2–2	0–0	0–0	1–1	1–3	1–0	3–1	1–1		0–0	2–2	2–2
Kolding	1–0	1–1	1–3	3–0	2–1	3–1	0–0	2–1	0–1		2–3	1–0
Lyngby	2–1	3–3	0–0	1–1	2–0	4–0	1–2	3–0	1–2	2–0		4–1
Middelfart BK	1–2	2–2	0–3	2–2	0–1	2–2	1–2	0–1	1–2	1–0	2–2	

Updated to match(es) played on completed. Source: Soccerway
Legend: Blue = home team win; Yellow = draw; Red = away team win.

== Promotion Group ==
=== League table ===
Pos	Team	Pld	W	D	L	GF	GA	GD	Pts	Promotion or Relegation
1	Lyngby (C, P)	32	18	6	8	69	36	+33	60	Promotion to Danish Superliga
2	AC Horsens (P)	32	15	9	8	42	27	+15	54	Promotion to Danish Superliga
3	Esbjerg fB	32	15	7	10	45	43	+2	52	
4	Hillerød	32	13	11	8	42	43	−1	50	
5	Hvidovre	32	11	13	8	43	39	+4	46	
6	Kolding	32	10	8	14	37	40	−3	38	

Source: Betinia LIGA
Rules for classification: 1) Points; 2) Goal difference; 3) Number of goals scored
(C) Champions; (P) Promoted

=== Results ===
Home \ Away	ACH	EFB	HIL	HVI	KOL	LYN
AC Horsens		4–1	4–0	1–1	1–0	1–0
Esbjerg fB	0–1		0–0	1–0	3–0	2–1
Hillerød	0–0	1–1		2–1	2–0	1–3
Hvidovre	1–1	1–4	1–1		2–1	0–2
Kolding	0–1	1–1	3–0	1–1		1–3
Lyngby	0–2	5–0	1–2	2–1	3–1	

Source: Soccerway
Legend: Blue = home team win; Yellow = draw; Red = away team win.

== Relegation Group ==
=== League table ===
Pos	Team	Pld	W	D	L	GF	GA	GD	Pts	Promotion or Relegation
1	AaB	32	12	10	10	50	47	+3	46	
2	Aarhus Fremad	32	11	11	10	52	37	+15	44	
3	Hobro	32	11	9	12	40	43	−3	42	
4	HB Køge	32	11	7	14	42	48	−6	40	
5	B.93 (R)	32	10	7	15	44	58	−14	37	Relegation to 2026–27 Danish 2nd Division
6	Middelfart BK (R)	32	3	6	23	32	77	−45	15	Relegation to 2026–27 Danish 2nd Division

Source: Betinia LIGA
Rules for classification: 1) Points; 2) Goal difference; 3) Number of goals scored
(R) Relegated

=== Results ===
Home \ Away	AAB	AAF	B93	HBK	HOB	MID
AaB		3–1	3–2	1–0	1–1	1–3
Aarhus Fremad	5–0		3–0	0–0	0–1	5–1
B.93	1–1	2–2		1–2	0–2	2–1
HB Køge	1–1	2–0	3–2		0–1	2–0
Hobro	0–1	0–3	3–3	1–2		3–2
Middelfart BK	2–5	0–1	2–4	0–4	0–6	

Source: Soccerway
Legend: Blue = home team win; Yellow = draw; Red = away team win.
