= Sabahoon Qaume =

Afghan footballer (born 1992)

Personal information
- Date of birth: 11 February 1992 (age 34)
- Place of birth: Khost, Afghanistan
- Height: 1.75 m (5 ft 9 in)
- Position: Right back

Team information
- Current team: Kolding IF

Senior career*
Years	Team	Apps	(Gls)
2009–	Kolding IF		

International career^{‡}
2015–	Afghanistan	2	(0)
- * Club domestic league appearances and goals as of 16:53, 28 August 2016 (UTC) ‡ National team caps and goals as of 16:53, 28 August 2016 (UTC)

Sabahoon Qaume (born 11 February 1992) is an Afghan international footballer who plays for Danish club Kolding IF, as a right back.
