= Tingbjerg Idrætspark =

Football stadium in Denmark

Coordinates: 55°43′07″N 12°29′32″E

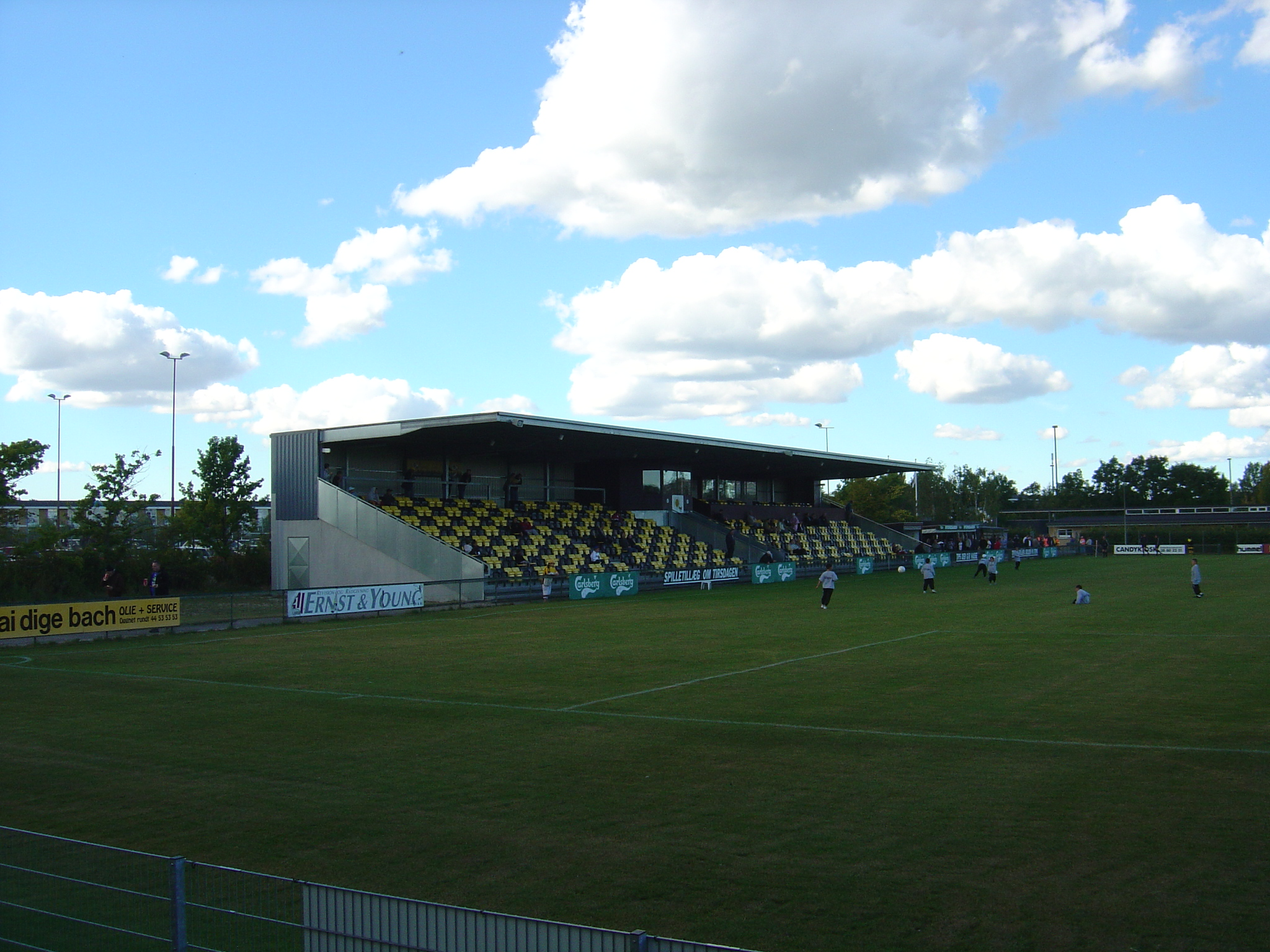
- Stand at Tingbjerg Idrætspark
- Interactive map of Tingbjerg Idrætspark
- Full name: Tingbjerg Idrætspark
- Location: Ruten 2 DK-2700 Brønshøj
- Capacity: 3,000 (600 seats)
- Surface: Natural grass
- Record attendance: 2,500 (Brønshøj vs Næstved, 1991)
- Field size: 105 by 68 metres (114.8 yd × 74.4 yd)

Construction
- Built: 1962
- Renovated: 1972, 2003

Tenant
- Brønshøj (1972–present)

Tingbjerg Idrætspark is an association football facility in Brønshøj, Denmark. Nicknamed Tingbjerg Ground, it is the home stadium of 2nd Division club Brønshøj Boldklub. The facility consists of a football stadium, an artificial pitch, a single gravel pitch with artificial lights and six natural grass football pitches. The stadium has a capacity of 6,000, of which 600 is seated.

The stadium's record attendance was set in 1991 at a match between Brønshøj and Næstved in front of 2,500 spectators.

== History ==
The area where the football pitches are today – a total of 13.7 hectares – was originally agricultural land, which Copenhagen Municipality acquired around 1900. The areas were initially laid out as allotment gardens.

In connection with the design of the residential area of Tingbjerg, which was overseen by urban planner Steen Eiler Rasmussen, space was set aside in the late 1940s for – in addition to training pitches for football – among other things an "exhibition pitch with a surrounding stadium (like Sundby, but with several running tracks.)" The entire area of Tingbjerg was built over a 15-year period from the late 1950s to the early 1970s.

In 1952, five clubs from the Brønshøj-Husum area expressed interest in having practice hours at the planned football facility at Hareskovvej/Rotunden. The five clubs were Brønshøj Boldklub, who were interested in a pitch for league use; Husum Boldklub, who wanted a pitch for league use and two pitches for practice; Velo, who were interested in a pitch for league use and one pitch for practice; FIX, who initially did not specify their wishes, and the club Sømod, a non-KBU club wanting one practice pitch. However, these wishes did not materialise into something concrete at first, which was announced to the clubs in 1955.

In the 1960s, things start to change. Brønshøj received permission to use a grass pitch at Hareskovvej, before the municipality built two gravel pitches at "Tingbjerg/Terrasserne", as the facility is now called. They took several years to construct due to Copenhagen Municipality using disabled workers for construction. The tracks were ready for use in the winter of 1961–62. Gravel track 1 was taken into use in January 1962, where the following clubs were awarded hours: Brønshøj, Husum, FIX, Union and LK. Gravel track 2 was created in January 1963, where the following clubs received practice hours: Brønshøj, Bellahøj IF, FIX, Union, LK, General Motors, Husum and Tingbjerg Ungdomsgården. In 1967, two new football pitches were established, and another two were added in 1970. In 1970, Københavns Idrætspark (KI) wrote in its annual report that the two gravel courts were used a total of 997 hours, while the four grass courts housed 168 competitive matches.

In 1972, Brønshøj Boldklub decided to move to the newly built Tingbjerg – initially only with their youth teams, but from 1977 also with the senior side. There, they joined Tingbjerg IF (formerly Bellahøj IF), who were already located at the facility. The newly constructed facility was designed by Steen Eiler Rasmussen's design studio for Copenhagen Municipality. There was a changing room barracks, which was moved to Amager Fælledvej as early as 1973. Throughout the years, several practice pitches were built in connection to the stadium.

Brønshøj Boldklub succeeded in building a new large clubhouse, with the inauguration taking place on 20 March 1998. In the beginning, there were thoughts of building a sports hotel next door, but this plan was abandoned due to financial reasons.

Along the way, there have been numerous expansions of the main pitch, not least encouraged by Brønshøj Boldklub who moved their home games from Vanløse Idrætspark to Tingbjerg in 1990. In the beginning, there were major problems with the drainage, but this remedied. In 2003, the grandstand was inaugurated and on 10 November 2012 lighting systems were inaugurated for the match against Lyngby Boldklub in the second-tier 1st Division. In October 2018, a brand new artificial turf pitch with cork as infill was inaugurated.
