= Joachim Nielsen (footballer) =

Danish footballer (born 2003)

Personal information
- Full name: Joachim Nielsen
- Date of birth: 17 September 2003 (age 23)
- Place of birth: Horsens, Denmark
- Position: Forward

Team information
- Current team: IF Lyseng
- Number: 12

Youth career
- AC Horsens

Senior career*
Years	Team	Apps	(Gls)
2021–2022	AC Horsens	1	(0)
2022–2025	Horsens fS		
2025–	IF Lyseng		
- * Club domestic league appearances and goals as of 19:20, 22 December 2021 (UTC)

Joachim Nielsen (born 17 September 2003) is a Danish footballer who plays as a forward for IF Lyseng.

== Career ==
=== Horsens ===
Nielsen is a product of AC Horsens. He got his official debut for Horsens on 24 May 2021 in a Danish Superliga game against OB. Nielsen started on the bench, before replacing Angelo Nehme in the 72nd minute. This was his only first team appearance in the 2020–21 season.
