= William Steindorsson =

Danish footballer

Personal information
- Full name: William Oliver Rohmann Steindorsson
- Date of birth: 21 April 2005 (age 21)
- Place of birth: Denmark
- Height: 1.88 m (6 ft 2 in)
- Positions: Winger; attacking midfielder

Team information
- Current team: Lyngby
- Number: 17

Youth career
- B 1903
- Lyngby

Senior career*
Years	Team	Apps	(Gls)
2024–	Lyngby	19	(3)
- * Club domestic league appearances and goals as of 2 June 2026

William Oliver Rohmann Steindorsson (born 21 April 2005) is a Danish footballer who plays as a winger or an attacking midfielder for Danish Superliga club Lyngby Boldklub.

== Club career ==
=== Lyngby ===
Steindorsson started his football career at B 1903 at the age of five. He later moved to Lyngby Boldklub as a U13 player. He worked his way up through the club's academy, and during his youth career, he was also selected for several national team training camps and youth national teams.

Steindorsson made his official debut for Lyngby's first team on 3 September 2024, when he came on as a substitute for Magnus Warming in a Danish Cup match against BK Frem. On 24 May 2025, he made his Danish Superliga debut, coming on as a substitute for Michael Opoku in a 3–1 victory over AaB.

On 18 June 2025, it was confirmed that Steindorsson had signed a new contract until June 2028 and was permanently moved up to the club's first team. On 25 May 2026, he extended his contract with Lyngby until June 2030.

== Honours ==
Lyngby

- Danish 1st Division: 2025–26
