= Mikkel Jespersen =

Danish footballer (born 1991)

Personal information
- Date of birth: 11 June 1991 (age 35)
- Place of birth: Vildbjerg, Denmark
- Position: Midfielder

Team information
- Current team: Lyngby (Manager)

Youth career
- Viborg
- Silkeborg

Senior career*
Years	Team	Apps	(Gls)
–2011	Herning Fremad		
2011–2015	Skive	99	(15)
2015–2017	Horsens	54	(4)
2017–2018	Viborg	19	(1)
2018–2021	Skive	62	(18)
2021–2024	Kolding	74	(7)

Managerial career
- 2018–2021: Horsens (first team staff)
- 2021–2023: Kolding (academy staff)
- 2023–2024: Kolding (player-assistant)
- 2024–2025: Mainz 05 (assistant)
- 2026–: Lyngby
- * Club domestic league appearances and goals as of 3 June 2024

Mikkel Jespersen (born 11 June 1991) is a Danish football manager and former player, who is co-manager of Danish Superliga club Lyngby.

== Club career ==
=== Skive ===
Jespersen came to Skive IK in January 2011. He played 127 games in total for the club, scoring 25 goals, before leaving the club in 2015.

=== Horsens ===
On 29 June 2015 it was announced, that Jespersen had signed for Horsens on a one-year deal. After playing one year in the Danish 1st Division, Jespersen and Horsens won promotion to the Danish Superliga. His contract got extended in May 2016 with further one year.

=== Later career ===
While playing for Skive which he returned to in the summer 2018, Jespersen announced in the beginning of July 2019 that he was helping Horsens manager Bo Henriksen scouting players in the Danish football divisions. On 31 July 2019, Horsens officially confirmed, that they had hired Jespersen as responsible for the recruitment and individual coach for the first team of the club alongside his playing career at Skive.

In June 2021, Jespersen joined Kolding IF as a player. Alongside this, Jespersen was also assigned to the club's academy, where he was going to be responsible for recruitment and individual development. In January 2023, Jespersen was given a new position as playing assistant coach of the first team; a position that Niki Zimling had just left.

On May 1, 2024, it was confirmed that Mikkel Jespersen would retire as a player, but would continue as an assistant coach in Kolding. But on July 17, 2024, Kolding confirmed that they had sold Jespersen to the German Bundesliga club Mainz 05, where he would be assistant coach to Danish Bo Henriksen. In December 2025, Jespersen was fired alongside Henriksen.

On 24 December 2025, the Danish 1st Division club Lyngby Boldklub confirmed that Jespersen had been appointed as the club's new head coach, where he would form the club's new head coach duo together with the club's current coach, Andreas Bjelland. The pair guided the club to the 2025–26 Danish 1st Division championship and promotion to the Superliga.

== Honours ==
=== Manager ===
Lyngby

- Danish 1st Division: 2025–26
