= Lasse Holmgaard =

Danish footballer and manager (born 1981)

Personal information
- Date of birth: 10 April 1981 (age 45)
- Place of birth: Nexø, Denmark
- Position: Midfielder

Youth career
- Nexø BK

Senior career*
Years	Team	Apps	(Gls)
2001	Hvidovre	8	(0)
2001–2004	Skjold	95	(?)
2005–2006	Horsens	19	(0)
2006–2009	LFA		
2009–2012	NB Bornholm		

Managerial career
- 2009–2018: NB Bornholm
- 2018–2019: Frem
- 2020–2021: Brønshøj
- 2024: Kolding
- * Club domestic league appearances and goals

Lasse Holmgaard (born 10 April 1981) is a Danish former football player and current manager.

== Career ==
Holmgaard started his playing career at Hvidovre IF i 2001. He then moved on to play for BK Skjold in the Danish 1st Division.

In January 2005 he joined AC Horsens in the Danish Superliga. He played 19 games in one and a half year, and then he moved to Lolland-Falster Alliancen in the Danish 2nd Divisions in order to get more time on the field.

In 2009 he returned to his childhood club NB Bornholm to become player-manager. In 2012 he got the team promoted to the Danish 2nd Divisions for the first time in the club's history. However, the team got relegated to the Denmark Series after only one season.

In 2018 he left NB Bornholm in order to take up the manager role at Boldklubben Frem. He lef the club at the end of the 2018/19 season.

On 5 October 2020 he was named new manager of Brønshøj Boldklub. He left his position on 9 June 2021 after disagreements with the club.

In January 2024, Holmgaard became assistant manager of Kristoffer Wichmann at Kolding IF, and when Wichmann in June 2024 was hired as assistant manager to Bo Svensson at 1. FC Union Berlin, Holmgaard became new manager of the club. He was sacked on 30 November 2024 following a 2-1-defeat against AC Horsens.
