= Hellerup Finans =

Former Danish company

- Company type: Private
- Founded: 2005; 21 years ago in Hellerup, Denmark
- Founder: Torben Jensen
- Defunct: 2018; 8 years ago
- Owner: Torben Jensen

Hellerup Finans was a Danish venture capital company. It was founded by Torben Jensen who was chairman and principal shareholder. Based in Hellerup, they were majority shareholder of the football club Lyngby Boldklub at their height. The company collapsed in 2018 following a high-profile scandal and was declared bankrupt by the Sø- og Handelsretten. The bankruptcy resulted in losses of DKK 200 million for individual investors.

== History ==
Hellerup Finans was founded in June 2005.

In 2014, the company took over Lyngby Boldklub which was then in the 1st Division and Hellerup Finans chairman became also chairman of the squad. The company informed at that time that it controlled 95.1 percent of the shares of the boldklub.

In 2015, the company took a major stake in the handball club Viborg HK and its holding company. Its investment resulted in a doubling of the club value but it began to seek an agreement to sell the club that same year. The club was eventually sold to a group of local businessmen for DKK 820,000 while retaining the shell holding company and renaming it Hellerup Consulting Group. In 2017, the shell was sentenced to delisting.

The company also in 2015 led a seed investment in a Danish real estate brokerage. It also had to cancel a tender offer which did not achieve sufficient support from shareholders.

Until its planned IPO in 2016, Hellerup Finans showed large profits until an investigation by Finanstilsynet showed dubious valuations for unlisted investments leading to corrected books showing massive losses. The Finanstilsynet referred the company and Torben Jensen to the police for marketing securities license between 2014 and 2015. It also targeted a subsidiary management company requiring corrections showing the company with negative equity of DKK 67 million.

The company began selling off portfolio to private investors raising with questions raised on where funds raised were directed. This included selling its 30% stake in water purifying company Cembrane for DKK 20 million leading to an accusation that it misled the buyers.

By 10 January 2018, the company was in liquidation at the sø- og Handelsretten with a deficit of DKK 53 million bringing two-year losses to mover than DKK 160 million. Originally it was intended to be a restructuring, it resulted in liquidation. The company was then determined to be bankrupt. Among the creditors was the tax agency SKAT which claimed to be owed DKK 8 million. This also resulted in bankruptcy for its Superliga squad Lyngby Boldklub which depended upon liquidity from Hellerup Finans to finance its deficit of DKK 12 million at the end of 2016–17 season leaving it with equity of DKK 13 million.

The company's collapse resulted in DKK 200 million being wiped out for individual investors who explored a lawsuit against Torben Jensen, who himself described himself as "finished" in sø- og Handelsretten.

In 2019, Jensen was behind a new company Kapitalbasen which had begun solicitation of former Hellerup Finans investors for financing.
