= Hans Høllsberg =

Danish footballer (born 2002)

Personal information
- Date of birth: 3 January 2002 (age 24)
- Place of birth: Juelsminde, Denmark
- Positions: Defensive midfielder; right-back

Team information
- Current team: Kolding
- Number: 19

Youth career
- 2007–2013: Juelsminde IF
- 2013–2021: Vejle

Senior career*
Years	Team	Apps	(Gls)
2021–2023	Vejle	20	(0)
2022–2023	→ Esbjerg fB (loan)	20	(0)
2023–2026	Fremad Amager	44	(5)
2026–	Kolding	14	(0)
- * Club domestic league appearances and goals as of 2 June 2026

Hans Høllsberg (born 3 January 2002) is a Danish professional footballer who plays as a defensive midfielder or right-back for Danish 1st Division side Kolding IF.

== Career ==
=== Vejle ===
Høllsberg started his career at Juelsminde IF, before later moving to Vejle Boldklub at the age of 13. On 25 September 2020 Vejle confirmed, that Høllsberg had signed a new contract, running from the 1 January 2021 and one-and-a-half-years onwards.

After good performances in the 2021–22 pre-season with Vejle's first team, Høllsberg was rewarded with a new contract, this time until June 2024. Høllsberg was also permanently promoted to the first team squad. Shortly after, on 18 July 2021, Høllsberg got his official debut for Vejle in a Danish Superliga game against Randers FC. On 31 August 2022 it was confirmed, that Høllsberg had joined newly relegated Danish 2nd Division side Esbjerg fB on a season-long loan deal. Høllsberg returned to Vejle at the end of the season.

=== Fremad Amager & Kolding IF ===
On 30 August 2023, Høllsberg joined newly relegated Danish 2nd Division side Fremad Amager.

On 15 January 2026, Fremad Amager confirmed that they had agreed to terminate Høllsberg's contract at his own request, as he wished to return to Jutland for personal reasons. But already the following day, it was confirmed that Høllsberg had signed with the Danish 1st Division club Kolding IF on a contract running until June 2028.

Following this, Høllsberg became the subject of sharp criticism, particularly from Fremad Amager’s sporting director, David Boysen, who posted an Instagram story in which he wrote, among other things: “Less than 48 hours ago, one of our players came to me and said: ‘My girlfriend is in Aarhus, and I have been through so much and don’t know what to do. I would really just like to go home, and if you are willing to listen and allow me to do so, would it be possible to receive some salary, because I don’t know when I will be paid again.’ I chose to put myself in his position and think about the person (as I have also stated publicly). Twenty-four hours after the contract termination, he has now signed a two-and-a-half-year deal with a new club. We receive nothing, and the player has received salary from us. Good style from the new club and the agents, and of course from the player himself. And I bet I am now the villain”.
