= Daniel Stenderup =

Danish footballer (born 1989)

Personal information
- Full name: Daniel Kenn Stenderup
- Date of birth: 31 May 1989 (age 37)
- Place of birth: Copenhagen, Denmark
- Height: 1.86 m (6 ft 1 in)
- Position: Centre-back

Team information
- Current team: Hvidovre
- Number: 2

Youth career
- 1996–2003: Vanløse
- 2003–2004: B.93
- 2004–2008: Brøndby

Senior career*
Years	Team	Apps	(Gls)
2008–2014	Brøndby	81	(1)
2014–2017	Esbjerg	63	(0)
2017–2019	Roskilde	68	(1)
2019–	Hvidovre	197	(10)

International career
2007	Denmark U18	1	(1)
2007	Denmark U19	2	(0)
2007	Denmark U20	3	(0)
2010	Denmark U21	1	(0)
- * Club domestic league appearances and goals as of 2 June 2026

Daniel Kenn Stenderup (born 31 May 1989) is a Danish professional footballer who plays as a centre-back for Danish 1st Division club Hvidovre.

== Career ==
=== Brøndby ===
Stenderup began playing football in the youth teams of Vanløse in 1996, before joining Brøndby's academy as a 15-year-old, after a one-year stint at B.93. On 24 August 2008, he made his professional debut for Brøndby in a 7–1 Danish Cup win over lowly Frem Sakskøbing, replacing Mikkel Bischoff in the 73rd minute.

He was promoted to the first team in July 2009. However, he had to wait until 3 October 2010 for his league debut, as head coach Henrik Jensen started him in a 1–0 home loss to AC Horsens. In the game, he put up a good performance, albeit making a crucial mistake which led to Gilberto Macena's lone goal which proved decisive. He soon became an established starter in Brøndby's defense, making 22 appearances of which 20 as a starter during his first full season as part of the first-team core.

On 28 July 2011, Stenderup made his European debut, starting in Brøndby's 2–0 away defeat against Austrian club SV Ried in the third-qualifying round of the UEFA Europa League. He would also appear as a starter in the return leg, where his club was knocked out on away goals after Ried managed two late goals in a 4–2 Brøndby win.

Stenderup scored his first goal for Brøndby on 9 March 2014 in his 83rd game as a professional, helping his team to a 4–1 league victory against Nordsjælland.

=== Esbjerg fB ===
On 25 July 2014, Stenderup signed a one-year contract with Esbjerg fB. He made his debut for the club on 16 August, starting in a 1–1 league draw against AaB. On 13 January 2015, he extended his contract with Esbjerg until 2017. He was part of the Esbjerg team reaching the semi-finals of the 2014–15 Danish Cup, where they were knocked out by eventual winners Copenhagen.

On 31 October 2016, it was announced that Stenderup's contract with Esbjerg had been terminated by mutual consent, with him leaving the club in January 2017.

=== Roskilde ===
Stenderup joined Danish 1st Division club FC Roskilde in January 2017. On 5 March 2017, he made his debut for the club as a starter in a 4–0 away win over AB. He was praised for his performances early on, being exceptionally adept verbally to influence other players to maintain a well-balanced defence at all times.

He confirmed his departure from the club on 10 July 2019. Stenderup finished his spell at Roskilde with one goal in 69 appearances.

=== Hvidovre ===
On 20 August 2019, Stenderup officially signed with Danish 1st Division club Hvidovre after a successful trial. He had already made his competitive debut two days earlier, starting in a league game against Næstved Boldklub. In January 2020, he extended his contract with the club by six months. His first goal for Hvidovre came on 6 June 2020, heading home the 1–0 winner against Nykøbing. As a result of his strong performances for the club, where he had taken on a leading role, his contract was extended by another season in July 2020.

He reached promotion to the Danish Superliga with Hvidovre in the 2022–23 season. Upon promotion, he stated that he wanted to end his career at the club.

== Personal life ==
In 2020, next to playing semi-professional football at Hvidovre, Stenderup started a civil career as an assistant construction site supervisor at club sponsor KBS Byg A/S, a company specialising in construction management.

== Career statistics ==
As of match played 29 November 2024

Appearances and goals by club, season and competition
Club	Season	League			Danish Cup		Europe		Total	
Club	Season	Division	Apps	Goals	Apps	Goals	Apps	Goals	Apps	Goals
Brøndby	2008–09	Superliga	0	0	2	0	0	0	2	0
Brøndby	2009–10	Superliga	0	0	0	0	0	0	0	0
Brøndby	2010–11	Superliga	22	0	0	0	0	0	0	0
Brøndby	2011–12	Superliga	32	0	2	0	2 (Note: Appearances in UEFA Europa League)	0	36	0
Brøndby	2012–13	Superliga	17	0	4	0	—		21	0
Brøndby	2013–14	Superliga	5	1	0	0	—		5	1
Brøndby	Total		76	1	8	0	2	0	86	1
Esbjerg fB	2014–15	Superliga	25	0	5	1	2	0	32	1
Esbjerg fB	2015–16	Superliga	30	0	1	0	—		31	0
Esbjerg fB	2016–17	Superliga	8	0	1	0	—		9	0
Esbjerg fB	Total		63	0	7	1	2	0	72	1
Roskilde	2016–17	1st Division	6	0	0	0	—		6	0
Roskilde	2017–18	Superliga	32	1	0	0	—		32	1
Roskilde	2018–19	Superliga	30	0	1	0	—		31	0
Roskilde	Total		68	1	1	0	—		69	1
Hvidovre	2019–20	1st Division	28	3	3	0	—		31	3
Hvidovre	2020–21	1st Division	26	2	2	0	—		28	2
Hvidovre	2021–22	1st Division	32	2	3	0	—		35	2
Hvidovre	2022–23	1st Division	31	2	1	0	—		32	2
Hvidovre	2023–24	Superliga	21	0	0	0	—		21	0
Hvidovre	2024–25	1st Division	17	1	1	0	—		18	1
Hvidovre	Total		155	10	9	0	—		165	10
Career total			362	12	25	1	4	0	392	13
