= Richmond Gyamfi =

Ghanaian footballer (born 2004)

Personal information
- Date of birth: 9 September 2004 (age 22)
- Place of birth: Accra, Ghana
- Height: 1.85 m (6 ft 1 in)
- Position: Forward

Team information
- Current team: AGF
- Number: 18

Youth career
- Field Masters

Senior career*
Years	Team	Apps	(Gls)
- Field Masters
2024	Hobro	13	(3)
2024–	AGF	4	(0)
2025	→ Hobro (loan)	11	(1)
2025–2026	→ Esbjerg fB (loan)	8	(1)
- * Club domestic league appearances and goals as of 21:09, 4 December 2025 (UTC)

Richmond Gyamfi (born 9 September 2004) is a Ghanaian professional footballer who plays as a forward for Danish Superliga club AGF.

== Career ==
=== Club career ===
Born and raised in Accra, Ghana, Gyamfi started playing for Ghanaian second division club Field Masters SC.

Gyamfi was at one point on trial at Danish club Hobro IK. He was again in the winter of 2024, where Gyamfi ended up signing a contract until the end of 2027 with the Danish 1st Division club. Already on 25 February 2024, Gyamfi made his debut when he was substituted in a 0–2 defeat to FC Fredericia in the league. It ended up being a very good half-season for young Gyamfi, who scored three goals and four assists in 10 league games.

After the season, there was reportedly some interest in Gyamfi. He ended up moving to AGF in July 2024 on a long-term contract until June 2029. According to media reports, Gyamfi was sold for 9 million Danish kroner. Gyamfi made his Danish Superliga debut on 28 July 2024, against F.C. Copenhagen.

With just 34 minutes of playing time in the league and two cup games for AGF in the first six months, Gyamfi was loaned out to his former club Hobro IK on 15 January 2025 for the rest of the season in search of more playing time. He returned to AGF at the end of the spell.

On 7 August 2025, Gyamfi was loaned out to Danish 1st Division side Esbjerg fB until the end of the season.
