= Kristoffer Wichmann =

Danish football manager and player (born 1981)

- Wichmann (center) in 2026

Personal information
- Full name: Kristoffer Bangsbo Wichmann
- Date of birth: 16 June 1981 (age 45)
- Place of birth: Aalborg, Denmark
- Height: 1.89 m (6 ft 2 in)
- Position: Right-back

Youth career
- Støvring IF
- AaB

Senior career*
Years	Team	Apps	(Gls)
	Aalborg Chang	25	(1)
2000–2001	Nørresundby	15	(2)
2001–2002	Hvidovre IF	24	(2)
2002–2003	HIK	32	(6)
2003–2005	BK Skjold	64	(8)
2005–2007	Køge BK	49	(8)
2007	AB	12	(1)
2008–2009	Fremad Amager	30	(4)
2009–2013	Vestsjælland	140	(12)
2013–2016	Hvidovre IF	90	(10)
2016–2018	HIK	68	(5)
Total		549	(59)

Managerial career
- 2019–2021: HIK
- 2021–2024: Kolding
- 2025: AaB
- * Club domestic league appearances and goals

Kristoffer Bangsbo Wichmann (born 16 June 1981) is a Danish football manager and former player. He currently serves as an assistant coach for Copenhagen in the Danish Superliga.

Born in Aalborg, Wichmann began his playing career at Støvring IF before moving to the youth academy of AaB. Between 2000 and 2018, he played for several clubs around Denmark, most notably for FC Vestsjælland where he was the subject of a betting scandal. Following his playing career, he served as head coach for HIK, Kolding, and AaB. He also briefly served as an assistant coach at German club Union Berlin.

== Playing career ==
Wichmann's youth career started at Støvring IF and later continued with AaB, before making a professional move to Aalborg Chang in 2000. Additionally, he played briefly for Nørresundby in the lower leagues of Danish football. In his formative years as a footballer, he played at both striker and edge player.

In the summer of 2001, Wichmann joined Danish 1st Division club Hvidovre IF. He made his debut for the club on 5 August 2001, coming on as a substitution at home against B.93. His debut goal would later come against FC Fredericia. In total, he would make 24 appearances and score twice for the club before his departure in the summer of 2002, following Peter Schmeichel relinquishing his investment into the club.

Moving north in the summer of 2002, Wichmann joined 1st Division club Hellerup IK. He went on to make 32 appearances with six goals for the club, though he had received minor interest from other clubs. He was invited to a trial with Italian club Juventus during the winter break where his uncle Jens Andersen was an assistant coach at the time. Despite the trial with Juventus and a later trial with Akademisk Boldklub, neither club offered him a contract.

With his contract with Hellerup ending as the club was relegated to the Danish 2nd Division, Wichmann had a trial with amateur club BK Skjold. After a successful training, head coach Lars Højer chose to offer him a one-year contract. Wichmann played in a majority of the games for the club during his first season, which included one goal against Ølstykke FC. His performances led him to staying an additional season with the club, where he retained his role as a regular starter as he moved to right-back, a position where he would regularly feature for the remainder of his playing career.

Herfølge Boldklub coach Gregor Rioch signed Wichmann in July 2005, signing a two-year contract. The contract was invalidated within weeks as a merger between Herfølge and Køge BK to form a superstructure fell apart. As the two clubs separated again, Wichmann chose to follow Rioch to Køge BK, where he made his debut for the club on 30 July 2005 in a match against Brabrand. He became a regular in the first-team squad for the next several seasons. In March 2007, the club suspended payments due to financial difficulties, resulting in the immediate release of all players. Due to the club's suspension, he agreed to trial for Norwegian club Sogndal, alongside teammate Morten Christensen.

Wichmann agreed to a one-year contract with Akademisk Boldklub on 16 July 2007. His stay with the club would be short, despite starting in eight matches with the club during the start of the season. Two yellow cards resulting in a red, as well as an injury, sidelined him for the remainder of the fall and he did not make another appearance for the club. His contract with the club was terminated with mutual consent, returning to non-football related work for several months while continuing to rehabilitate from the injury.

Shortly before Christmas on 20 December 2007, Wichmann signed a two-year contract with Fremad Amager of the Danish 2nd Division. Amager were promoted at the end of the 2007–08 season, defeating Brabrand 4–0 on aggregate. He played for the club until March 2009 when, due to financial difficulties regarding the FC Amager superstructure, all players were released from their contracts.

Shortly after the collapse of FC Amager, both Wichmann and teammate Daniel Udsen signed for FC Vestsjælland. He became the club's captain in July by head coach Michael Schjønberg, replacing Andreas Mortensen. He made over 100 appearances for the club between his arrival until his eventual departure in the spring of 2013, as a result of a betting scandal.

=== Betting scandal ===
While a player for FC Vestsjælland, Wichmann was found guilty on 4 February 2013 of match-fixing level one due to betting on the outcome of a game in which he participated. He was initially subjected to a six-month ban due for his alleged actions as well as failure to cooperate with the Danish Football Association's (DBU) investigation. The case was the first in Denmark to be tried as match-fixing level two; however, the DBU was unable to find sufficient evidence to support the claim.

The pivotal point in the case was a cup match between FC Vestsjælland and Ballerup-Skovlunde on 31 August 2011, where Wichmann had bet an amount on Vestsjælland winning, though he was substituted into the match after 56 minutes with the Vestsjælland already holding a 4–0 lead. In doing so, he violated the DBU's code of ethics and a corresponding provision in his player contract regarding the Circular on Match Fixing. He chose to appeal the ruling immediately after the verdict, as he pleaded not guilty and stated that the DBU was using him to garner political attention for the match-fixing problem.

Shortly after the ruling from the DBU, Wichmann was suspended from Vestsjælland. However, the club lifted the suspension on 14 March 2013, when his suspension was lifted as a result of an ongoing appeal case. In connection with the admission of his guilt, he was released from his contract with the club by mutual consent. During the subsequent appeal case, which was treated as a confession case, the suspension was reduced by five weeks, and a kr. 25,000 fine was given for violating the DBU's rules.

By ruling of 27 June 2013, Wichmann's suspension was extended to 31 December 2013, and his fine increased to kr. 30,000. for having bet on a number of additional matches that were not covered by the first case, including two matches where he had bet on a draw in his own matches. This suspension was shortened on 29 August 2013 and the suspension had thus been served as of 5 August 2013. He was therefore eligible to play again and shortly afterwards signed a contract with the newly promoted 1st Division club Hvidovre IF.

The DBU also filed a police report against Wichmann to pursue criminal prosecution, though the police found no grounds to bring charges against him by June 2013.

=== Late career ===
In September 2013, Wichmann returned to football when he signed for Hvidovre on a one-year contract, who were competing in the 1st Division at the time. After three years in Hvidovre, he returned to HIK at age 35. He signed a through the summer of 2017, returning to the club 13 years after he last departed. He played for the club until his retirement, when he was named as head coach of the club on 17 November 2018.

== Managerial career ==
Wichmann took the DBU A-license training, where he obtained the license while still an active footballer himself, while later acquiring a UEFA Pro License. His first head coaching role came on 17 November 2018, where his former club HIK named him as their manager on a two-year contract. He held the position until 28 February 2021 when Kolding IF announced that they had hired Wichmann as their new head coach. He departed HIK as they sat in 2nd place in the Danish 2nd Division.

=== Kolding ===
Wichmann's first full season in charge of Kolding saw the club finish in a mid-table position, finishing the first round of the competition in 10th place before climbing to finish second in the relegation group. The team did find success in the 2021–22 Danish Cup, putting together several wins to find their way into the quarter-final of the competition. Kolding lost the first leg of their quarter-final tie against Vejle 5–1. Despite a 2–1 win in the second leg, the difference was too much to overcome as they lost 6–3 on aggregate.

Wichmann's 2022–23 season saw Kolding perform much better in the league, finishing third in the first round to advance to the promotion group. He went on to lead the club to a first-place finish, winning the 2nd Division title and gaining promotion to the 2023–24 Danish 1st Division. Kolding's first season back in the 1st Division saw moderate success, finishing in the top half of the opening round and third overall in the promotion group.

=== Union Berlin assistant ===
Following the conclusion of the 2023–24 season, Wichmann moved to become an assistant coach at German Bundesliga club Union Berlin under fellow Dane Bo Svensson. However, Svensson was sacked following poor results on 27 December, resulting in the contract termination of Wichmann and other assistants.

=== AaB ===
On 23 April 2025, Wichmann returned to a head coaching role as he signed for AaB in the Danish Superliga, as the club sat in the relegation zone. He became the fourth manager at the club in twelve months. His first match in charge ended in a 1–0 defeat to last-place Vejle. After taking charge of the club, he failed to produce a win in any of his five matches, which included four defeats and ultimately led to the club confirming relegation to the Danish 1st Division on 18 May. A 3–1 defeat to fellow relegated club Lyngby on the final matchday secured their last-place finish. Despite joining the club on a two year contract, he was sacked on 26 May after just 33 days in charge.

Several weeks after his departure, Wichmann published a letter in MigogAalborg, a local news outlet. In his letter, he stated that his relationship with the club's owners was tumultuous from the beginning as they often did not agree. The club administration defended their decision, in which they had also sacked sporting director James Gøw. Wichmann's departure led to an increase in fan protests, as fans were displeased with club ownership.

=== Copenhagen assistant ===
Wichmann returned to coaching in March 2026 with Copenhagen on a short-term contract. He was appointed as an assistant coach, focusing on the first team's set pieces. His contract was later extended in June 2026.

== Personal life ==
Wichmann is married with three children.

== Career statistics ==
As of match played 24 May 2025

Managerial record by team and tenure
Team	From	To	Record					Ref.
Team	From	To	G	W	D	L	Win %	Ref.
HIK	16 November 2018	20 February 2021	46	18	19	9	39.1	
Kolding	21 February 2021	1 June 2024	125	58	30	37	46.4	
AaB	23 April 2025	26 May 2025	5	0	1	4	0.0	
Career total			176	76	50	50	43.2	

== Honors ==
Kolding

- Danish 2nd Division: 2022–23
