= Angelo Nehmé =

Danish footballer (born 2004)

Personal information
- Full name: Angelo Luca Nehmé
- Date of birth: 23 January 2004 (age 22)
- Position: Winger

Team information
- Current team: Thisted FC
- Number: 27

Youth career
- Herning Fremad
- –2019: Ikast FS
- 2019–2020: Midtjylland
- 2020–2024: AC Horsens

Senior career*
Years	Team	Apps	(Gls)
2021–2025	AC Horsens	20	(1)
2024–2025	→ Næstved (loan)	23	(1)
2025–2026	Trelleborgs FF	10	(0)
2026–	Thisted FC	15	(3)
- * Club domestic league appearances and goals as of 29 May 2026

Angelo Luca Nehmé (born 23 January 2004) is a Danish professional footballer who plays as a winger for Danish club Thisted FC.

== Club career ==
Coming from Ikast's youth sector, Nehmé joined the Midtjylland Academy in 2019. In October 2020, he moved to AC Horsens's youth sector, signing a three-year contract.

Nehmé made his senior debut on 24 May 2021, as a starter in a Danish Superliga game against OB. He was made part of the first team on 25 July 2023, and signed a three-year contract on 2 August. Nehmé's first goal for Horsens came on 19 April 2024, scoring a 90th-minute equalizer against Helsingør in the Danish 1st Division.

On 2 September 2024, Nehmé joined Danish 2nd Division club Næstved on a season-long loan deal.

On 27 June 2025, Nehmé moved to Swedish Superettan side Trelleborgs FF on a deal until 2028.

== International career ==
Nehmé was selected to train for the Denmark national under-17 team in September 2020.

== Style of play ==
Nehmé is an ambidextrous and versatile player known for his speed, technique, and adaptability across multiple positions. He is capable of playing as a winger, box-to-box midfielder, or wingback, and is effective on both flanks. While often deployed on the left wing, he poses a threat cutting inside onto his right foot or going wide using his left, making him a dynamic presence in wide and central roles.

== Career statistics ==
=== Club ===
As of match played 1 November 2025

Appearances and goals by club, season and competition
Club	Season	League			National cup (Note: Includes Danish Cup, Svenska Cupen)		Total	
Club	Season	Division	Apps	Goals	Apps	Goals	Apps	Goals
AC Horsens	2020–21	Superliga	1	0	0	0	1	0
AC Horsens	2021–22	1st Division	0	0	2	0	2	0
AC Horsens	2022–23	Superliga	0	0	1	0	1	0
AC Horsens	2023–24	1st Division	19	1	1	0	20	1
AC Horsens	2024–25	1st Division	0	0	1	0	1	0
AC Horsens	Total		20	1	5	0	25	1
Næstved (loan)	2024–25	2nd Division	23	1	—		23	1
Trelleborgs FF	2025	Superettan	10	0	1	0	11	0
Career total			53	1	6	0	59	1
