= Brønshøj Boldklub =

Danish football club

Brønshøj BK
- Full name: Brønshøj Boldklub
- Nickname: Hvepsene (The Wasps)
- Founded: 1919; 107 years ago
- Ground: Tingbjerg Idrætspark, Brønshøj
- Capacity: 4,000
- Chairman: Peer Goe
- Manager: Jan Faber
- League: Danish 3rd Division
- 2025–26: Danish 3rd Division, 4th of 12
- Website: http://www.bronshojboldklub.dk/
Home colours	Away colours

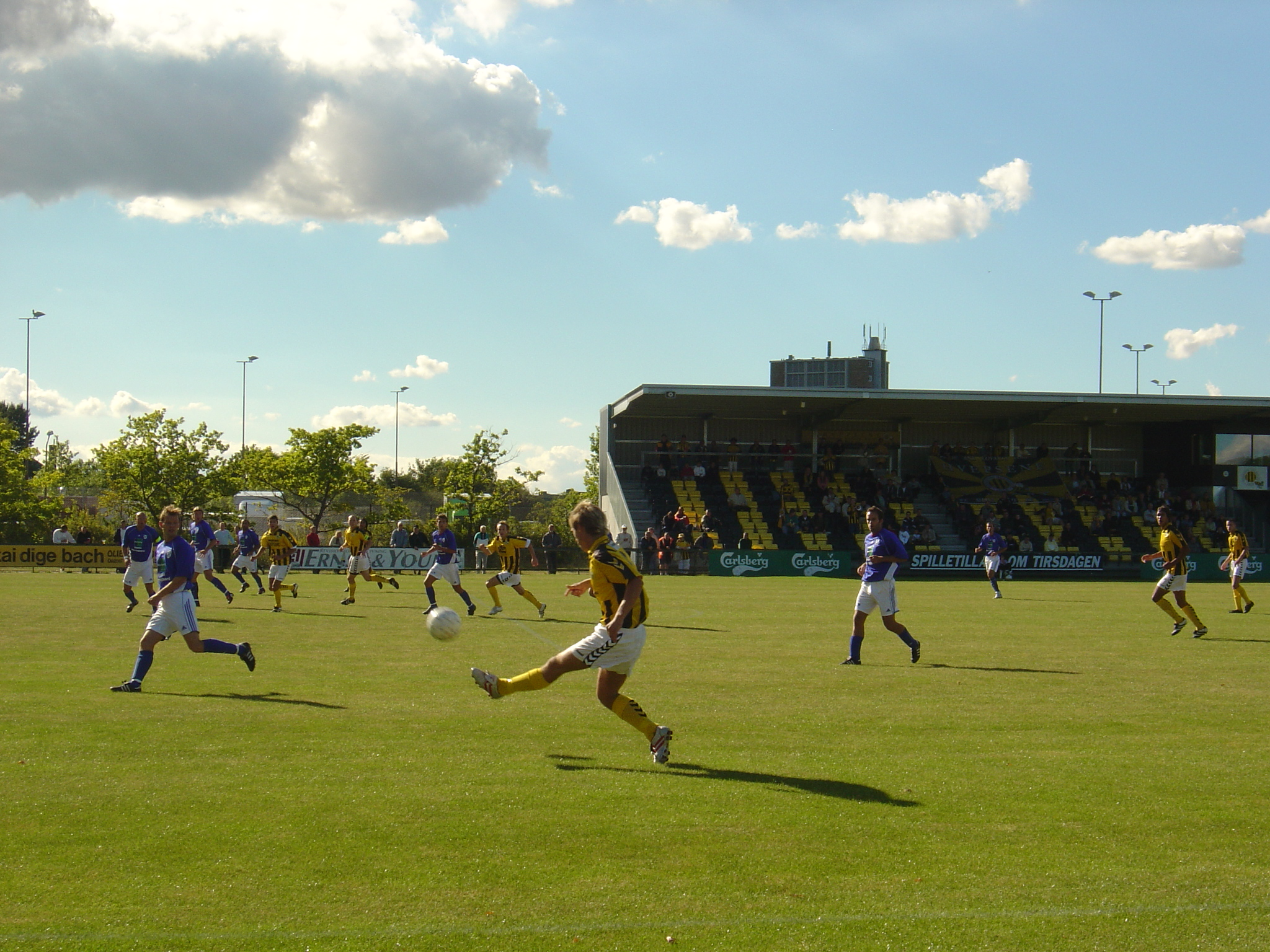
Brønshøj Boldklub – Fremad Amager, 2005.

Brønshøj Boldklub, commonly referred to as Brønshøj BK, is a Danish football club based in the Brønshøj district of Copenhagen. Founded on 15 May 1919, the club plays its home matches at Tingbjerg Idrætspark and currently competes in the Danish 3rd Division, the fourth tier of Danish football.

The club reached its highest-ever 1st Division finish of fifth place in 1984 under manager Ebbe Skovdahl, and has been represented on the Denmark national team by eleven players, most notably Per Røntved and Kent Nielsen. Finn Laudrup, father of Michael and Brian Laudrup, also came through the club. Brønshøj has never operated as a fully professional club and has historically maintained a strong identity as a working-class neighbourhood club rooted in its local community.

== History ==
=== Early years ===
Brønshøj BK's first decades were spent in local leagues in the Copenhagen area, and also saw mergers with other local teams, although always retaining the name Brønshøj Boldklub.

Brønshøj Boldklub had their first appearance in Danmarksturneringen (the national league system) in the season of 1944–45 after winning a qualification group, and the team has continuously since then been a part of the Danmarksturneringen. The next decade was spent yo-yoing between the two lower tiers, the team almost getting demoted out of the league system in the season of 1952–53. They were saved only by a marginally better goal difference than Hvidovre IF.

=== 1st Division ===
The late 1950s saw the team make a positive turn around, first winning the 3rd tier in 1955–56, and then winning the 2nd tier in 1961, thereby entering the 1st tier (1. division) for the first time ever in 1962. Relegation followed in 1964. The team stuck in 2. division for a handful of seasons being runners up in 1969, and thus getting promoted to 1.division yet again. The stay in the highest league lasted three seasons.

This part of the century in a way marked the best days of Brønshøj BK. The team did not make the top of the 1st tier, but they were relatively competitive in the league due to the strict code of amateurism that Danish football was under at the time. The team also managed to make it to the semifinals of the Danish Cup three times, and additionally about a dozen players appeared on the national team.

=== The peak ===
The team was again yo-yoing between the two lower tiers for several seasons, before two consecutive promotions again saw them a place in the 1st tier (1.division) in 1983.

Brønshøj BK reached its peak in the season of 1984 under the guidance of manager Ebbe Skovdahl, when the team finished in 5th place in 1. division, the club's all-time highest. The club was relegated from the 1. division in 1989, and has not since then been represented in the highest tier.

The explanation for this last fact could be that in the meantime, the national league system had undergone a dramatic change, with the introduction of professional football in 1978. Brønshøj BK did (and do) sign contracts with some of their players, but they have never featured a full-time professional squad, so even today, this is meaningful as it shows an economical responsibility that has kept the club free from the bankruptcies, overstretching of budgets and mergings, that has been the fate of several other Danish teams over the years. At the same time though, the shown responsibility has made it increasingly hard to compete with the top-flight teams.

=== Recent years ===
After winning the third tier in 2009–10, the club spent five seasons in the Danish 1st Division under manager Bo Henriksen, from 2010–11 to 2014–15. Relegation to the Danish 2nd Division followed at the end of the 2014–15 season. In 2018, the club narrowly avoided a further drop out of the national league system on the final day of the season, with a victory over Greve Fodbold securing their place.

The 2020–21 season brought the club's most significant setback in decades. A 5–1 defeat to Næstved confirmed relegation from the 2nd Division to the Denmark Series, ending 76 consecutive years of divisional football since the club's first entry into the national league system in 1944–45. Goalkeeper Kasper Vilfort described the dressing room as "extremely quiet", saying that despite the club having struggled throughout the season, "it was still heavy, because it became official". Manager Lasse Holmgaard resigned in the days that followed, citing disagreements over the sporting direction for the club's time in the Denmark Series.

The club spent three seasons in the Denmark Series—which became the fifth tier of Danish football from 2021–22 following the introduction of the Danish 3rd Division as a new layer in the pyramid—before winning promotion back to the divisions in June 2024 with a 1–0 victory away at Marienlyst in Odense.

== Notable players ==
- Most appearances: Brian Kaus, 350 appearances in all. (1985–90, 1996–2004)
- Most goals: Kaj Petterson, 314 goals. (1938–54)
- Preben (Benny) Arentoft: played 96 games, 1961–65; club manager, 1974–79. Became the first Danish footballer to win a European cup title when Newcastle United (England) won the Inter-Cities Fairs Cup in 1969.

== National team ==
11 players in all have represented Brønshøj BK on the Danish national team, almost all of them in the period from the late 1950s to the early 1970s. The last player to represent the club on the Danish national team was Kent Nielsen in 1986. In 2018 Brønshøj BK was represented by 2 players on the Gambia national football team.

First representative on a national team: Ove Andersen in 1955.

Most caps: Per Røntved, 21 matches from 1970 to 1972. (He had 75 caps overall)

== Current squad ==
As of 6 September 2026 Note: Flags indicate national team as defined under FIFA eligibility rules; some limited exceptions apply. Players may hold more than one non-FIFA nationality.

No.	Pos.	Nation	Player
1	GK	DEN	Bertram Pihl
2	DF	DEN	Kasper Heerfordt
3	DF	DEN	Otto Dupont
4	DF	DEN	Villads Gudbrand
5	MF	DEN	Tobias Noer
6	DF	DEN	Lukas Kiilerich
7	MF	DEN	Victor Svensson
8	MF	DEN	Essam Salamoun
9	FW	DEN	Morten Voldby Olsen
10	DF	DEN	Pierre Larsen
11	FW	DEN	Frederik Nedergaard
12	MF	DEN	Johan Haslund
14	FW	DEN	Victor Faaborg
15	DF	DEN	Alexander Stjernegaard

No.	Pos.	Nation	Player
16	FW	DEN	Anders Fæster
17	DF	DEN	Malek Bakhit
18	DF	DEN	Mathias Sommer
20	GK	DEN	Lucas Chang-Andersen
21	MF	DEN	Hamza Ghulam
22	MF	DEN	Emil Borella
23	MF	DEN	Hjalte Toftegaard (on loan from Hillerød)
24	GK	DEN	Lucas Wernblad
25	DF	DEN	Anton Boye
26	FW	DEN	Tobias Friis
27	FW	DEN	Nikola Stojanovic
28	MF	DEN	Engelbert Owusu
29	DF	DEN	August Bille

== Achievements ==
- 14 seasons in the Highest Danish League
- 32 seasons in the Second Highest Danish League
- 20 seasons in the Third Highest Danish League

Brønshøj BK has made it to the semi-finals of the Landspokalturneringen (the equivalent of the English FA cup) four times. That was in the seasons of 1955/56, 1957/58, 1960/61 and 1987/88.

== Club culture and supporters ==
Brønshøj Boldklub, founded in 1919, has historically been rooted in being a working-class neighbourhood club located within Copenhagen. Since moving its home matches to Tingbjerg Idrætspark in 1976, the club has been closely associated with a modest, local ground that lacks physical separation between players and spectators. Tingbjerg has shaped the club's social character, with limited facilities, low ticket prices, and regular informal contact between supporters, players, and staff before and after matches. The ground does not meet Superliga standards, a fact that has been repeatedly cited by club officials and supporters as reinforcing the club's position outside fully commercialised professional football. From at least the early 2010s, both Brønshøj Boldklub and significant sections of its supporter base have expressed reluctance toward promotion, citing concerns that higher-level football would weaken the club's connection to Tingbjerg and its local community. Promotion has been associated with increased commercial pressures, higher operating costs, and the likelihood of relocating home matches away from Tingbjerg Idrætspark.

The supporter culture has consisted of both long-standing local followers and younger supporters from nearby working-class and inner-city districts such as Nørrebro and Copenhagen's northwest. The official supporters’ club, Hvepsene (meaning "the Wasps"), has focused on continuity, family involvement, and fundraising for the club, while the unofficial group Brønshøj Drunken Army emerged in the late 2000s as a more vocal and visible presence. By 2012, the Drunken Army was known for coordinated chanting, standing support, and a predominantly left-wing political identity, as well as for enforcing informal norms against racist or discriminatory behaviour among spectators. Politically, Brønshøj is identified as a left-leaning workers' club. During a match against Aarhus Gymnastikforening in 2015, Brønshøj supporters confronted the presence of far-right fans associated with the group "White Pride", blocking the away section and using chants to prevent them from entering the stadium. The political character of Brønshøj Boldklub is also evident in its local rivalry with Akademisk Boldklub, known as the Mose derby. The clubs are geographically close but socially distinct: Brønshøj draws from working-class and immigrant communities, while AB historically required players to have university degrees. The derby represents a cultural clash between academics and workers, yet players and supporters maintain a tradition of camaraderie, often sharing a beer after the match regardless of the result.

Brønshøj has been described as a club where players and supporters are closely interwoven in everyday practice. Players regularly socialised with supporters at Tingbjerg after matches, including shared meals and drinks, and were expected to engage with the surrounding community. The club's youth section reflected the demographic composition of Tingbjerg, with many players from immigrant backgrounds, and first-team players were involved in school and local activities.
