= Hjalte Toftegaard =

Danish footballer (born 2006)

Personal information
- Full name: Hjalte Toftegaard
- Date of birth: 25 June 2006 (age 20)
- Place of birth: Ringsted, Denmark
- Position: Midfielder

Team information
- Current team: Brønshøj (on loan from Hillerød)
- Number: 23

Youth career
- –2021: Næstved
- 2021–2025: Horsens

Senior career*
Years	Team	Apps	(Gls)
2023–2025	Horsens	16	(1)
2025–	Hillerød	11	(0)
2026–	→ Brønshøj (loan)	7	(0)
- * Club domestic league appearances and goals as of 4 October 2026

Hjalte Toftegaard (born 25 June 2006) is a Danish footballer, who plays as a midfielder for Brønshøj, on loan from Danish 1st Division club Hillerød.

== Club career ==
=== AC Horsens ===
Toftegaard moved to AC Horsens from Næstved IF in the summer of 2021. In March 2023, he signed his first contract with the club. On 7 May 2023, 16-year old Toftegaard got his professional debut for Horsens in a Danish Superliga game against AaB.

In January 2024, Toftegaard signed a full-time professional contract until June 2026 and was permanently promoted to the first team squad. However, in the 2024–25 season he was no longer part of the first team squad and was relegated to the U19 team again.

=== Hillerød ===
On 7 May 2025 it was confirmed, that Toftegaard would join Danish 1st Division club Hillerød Fodbold ahead of the 2025–26 season from AC Horsens. Toftegaard signed a deal until June 2028.

=== Loan to Brønshøj ===
On 21 August 2026, he was loaned out to Danish 3rd Division side Brønshøj Boldklub on a loan-deal until the end of 2026.
