= Pierre Larsen (footballer, born 1994) =

Danish footballer (born 1994)

Personal information
- Full name: Pierre Dahlin Larsen
- Date of birth: 16 July 1994 (age 32)
- Place of birth: Frederiksberg, Denmark
- Height: 1.73 m (5 ft 8 in)
- Positions: Right winger; right-back

Team information
- Current team: Brønshøj
- Number: 10

Youth career
- KB
- Copenhagen

Senior career*
Years	Team	Apps	(Gls)
2013	Brønshøj	4	(0)
2014–2015	Roskilde		
2015	Avarta		
2016	Frem		
2017–2018	Helsingør	16	(3)
2017–2018	→ Viborg (loan)	29	(8)
2018–2021	Fremad Amager	91	(12)
2021–2023	HB Køge	59	(6)
2023–2024	Trelleborgs FF	37	(6)
2025	Hillerød	10	(0)
2025–	Brønshøj	42	(6)
- * Club domestic league appearances and goals as of 4 October 2026

Pierre Dahlin Larsen (born 16 July 1994) is a Danish professional footballer who plays as a right winger or right-back for Danish 2nd Division club Brønshøj.

== Career ==
=== Club career ===
Larsen began his football career in local youth divisions in Copenhagen. During his early youth years, Larsen played for Kjøbenhavns Boldklub/F.C. Copenhagen, which he joined at the age of six. After a trial at HB Køge, which didn't result in a deal, 19-year-old Larsen moved to Danish 1st Division club Brønshøj Boldklub in July 2013 on a deal until the end of the year.

However, he didn't make a big breakthrough at Brønshøj and half a year later, in January 2014, he moved to Danish 2nd Division side FC Roskilde. Here he was part of the squad that secured promotion to the 2014-15 Danish 1st Division.

In search of more playing time, Larsen switched to Danish 2nd Division club BK Avarta in the summer of 2015. Larsen soon sought a new opportunity and, in February 2016, joined Boldklubben Frem, another 2nd Division club.

In February 2017, Larsen signed a contract with FC Helsingør, a club in the Danish 1st Division. He played 16 matches and scored three goals in his first season, and was thus an important part of the squad that secured a historic promotion to the 2017-18 Danish Superliga. His performances in Helsingør drew attention, and the club extended his contract for two years. Larsen only managed to make his professional debut in the Danish Superliga against Hobro IK on 16 July 2017, before he was loaned out to the newly relegated Danish 1st Division club Viborg FF a month later until the end of the season.

In August 2018, after returning from the loan spell at Viborg, Larsen signed with Fremad Amager, a 1st Division club. Larsen played 91 league matches and scored 12 goals over three years in the club.

In the summer 2021, Larsen signed a 2,5-year contract with HB Køge. In 2022, his contract was extended, and he continued playing a vital role in the midfield for the 1st Division club. He contributed both defensively and offensively and remained a key player for HB Køge until he left in 2023.

On 31 August 2023 Larsen was sold to Swedish Superettan club Trelleborgs FF. Here he played for a year and a half before moving back to Denmark, where he signed in January 2025 until June 2027 with the Danish 1st Division club Hillerød Fodbold.

On 4 July 2025, Larsen returned to his former club, Brønshøj Boldklub, on a two-year deal.
