= Albert Rudé =

Spanish manager

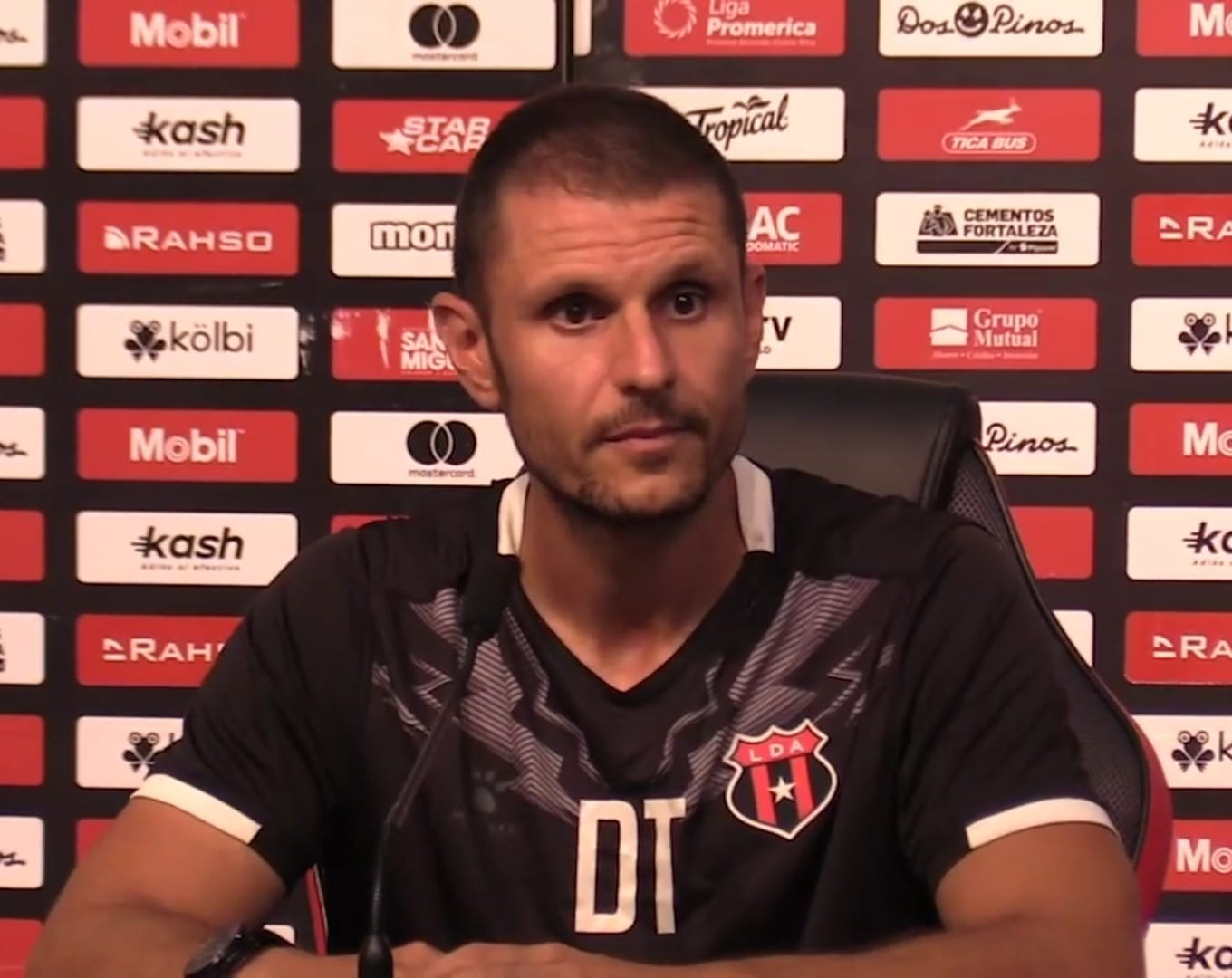
- Rudé with Alajuelense in 2022

Personal information
- Full name: Albert Rudé Rull
- Date of birth: 18 September 1987 (age 39)
- Place of birth: Ripoll, Spain
- Position: Forward

Team information
- Current team: Huesca (manager)

Senior career*
Years	Team	Apps	(Gls)
- Campdevànol
- Banyoles
2011–2012	Manlleu		
2012	Camprodon		

Managerial career
- 2013–2014: Manlleu (youth)
- 2015–2018: Pachuca (assistant)
- 2018–2019: Querétaro (youth)
- 2019–2020: Monterrey (assistant)
- 2020–2021: Inter Miami (assistant)
- 2021–2022: Alajuelense
- 2023: Castellón
- 2023: Gurb
- 2023–2024: Wisła Kraków
- 2025–2026: Kolding IF
- 2026–: Huesca
- * Club domestic league appearances and goals

Albert Rudé Rull (born 18 September 1987) is a Spanish professional football manager who is currently in charge of SD Huesca.

== Coaching career ==
Born in Ripoll, Girona, Catalonia, Rudé played for local sides UE Campdevànol, CE Banyoles, AEC Manlleu and UE Camprodon before retiring at the age of 24 due to a knee injury. He then trained amateur football clubs in his native region, as well as being a university professor at the University of Vic - Central University of Catalonia, before joining Mexican side CF Pachuca as an assistant manager to Diego Alonso in December 2015.

After three years at Pachuca, Rudé stayed in Mexico and was named manager of the under-17 team of Querétaro FC on 18 July 2018. He left the club after a year, and reunited with Alonso at CF Monterrey, again as his assistant.

On 13 January 2020, Rudé was once again named as Alonso's assistant, this time at Major League Soccer side Inter Miami CF for their inaugural campaign. On 7 January 2021, after Alonso left the club by mutual consent, he also departed the club.

On 30 September 2021, Rudé took his first outright job as a manager, as he was named the head coach of Costa Rican side LD Alajuelense. On 11 July 2022, after nearly ten months in charge, he was sacked following a 1–1 draw against CS Cartaginés four days earlier.

On 19 January 2023, Rudé returned to his home country and took over Primera Federación side CD Castellón, signing a contract until 2024; he replaced Rubén Torrecilla, who was sacked over a month before. He had his contract rescinded by the club on 26 June, and worked as manager of Tercera Catalana side UE Gurb shortly after.

On 29 December 2023, Rudé was announced as the new manager of Polish second division side Wisła Kraków, who at the time had nine Spaniards on their roster. On 2 May 2024, he won the first title in his managerial career after leading Wisła to a 2–1 victory over Pogoń Szczecin in the 2023–24 Polish Cup final. He failed in gaining promotion to the Ekstraklasa, as Wisła ended the 2023–24 I liga season in 10th place. On 31 May 2024, Rudé left Wisła by mutual consent.

On 6 January 2025, Rudé became the new manager of Danish 1st Division club Kolding IF. He left by mutual consent on 24 March 2026.

On 11 October 2026, Rudé returned to Spain and its third division, after being appointed at the helm of SD Huesca.

== Managerial statistics ==
As of match played 6 March 2026

Managerial record by team and tenure
Team	Nat	From	To	Record								Ref
Team	Nat	From	To	G	W	D	L	GF	GA	GD	Win %	Ref
Alajuelense	(Costa Rica)	30 September 2021	11 July 2022	40	21	10	9	60	31	+29	52.50	
Castellón	(Spain)	19 January 2023	24 June 2023	23	9	8	6	27	23	+4	39.13	
Wisła Kraków	(Poland)	29 December 2023	31 May 2024	18	8	4	6	30	31	−1	44.44	
Kolding IF	(Denmark)	6 January 2025	24 March 2026	39	19	8	12	56	41	+15	48.72	
Total				120	57	30	33	173	126	+47	47.50	—

== Honours ==
Wisła Kraków

- Polish Cup: 2023–24
