= Kristoffer Johannsen =

Danish footballer and manager (born 1977)

Personal information
- Full name: Kristoffer Hedegaard Johannsen
- Date of birth: 24 February 1977 (age 49)
- Height: 1.74 m (5 ft 9 in)
- Position: Midfielder

Team information
- Current team: Middelfart (Manager)

Youth career
- Roskilde Boldklub 1906
- KB

Senior career*
Years	Team	Apps	(Gls)
1994–1995	Copenhagen	1	(0)
1996–1997	Brøndby	0	(0)
1998	AB		
1998–1999	OB		
1999–2003	Emmen		
2003–2004	B 1913		
2005–2006	Vejle		
2007–2009	Fredericia		

International career
1992	Denmark U17	5	(0)
1994–1996	Denmark U19	12	(1)
1996	Denmark U21	7	(0)

Managerial career
- 2009–2011: Fredericia (assistant)
- 2011–2013: Otterup B&IK
- 2013–2017: Dalum
- 2017: OKS
- 2017–2023: Næsby
- 2023–2024: Middelfart
- 2025–2026: FC Roskilde
- 2026–: Middelfart
- * Club domestic league appearances and goals

Kristoffer Hedegaard Johannsen (born 24 February 1977) is a Danish professional football manager and former player, who is currently the manager of Danish 1st Division club Middelfart. He has played 24 games and scored one goal for various Danish national youth teams, including seven games for the Denmark national under-21 football team.

== Playing career ==
In his playing career, Johannsen played for a number of Danish clubs. He played one game in the Danish Superliga for FC Copenhagen in May 1995. In the winter 1995, he moved from FC Copenhagen to Brøndby IF. He did not play any first team games for Brøndby, and moved to AB in the winter 1997. He played for Odense Boldklub in 1998. In 1999, Johannsen moved to Dutch club FC Emmen where he played until the summer 2003. He played in B 1913 in the 2003–04 season. He played in Vejle BK from January 2005 to December 2006, before moving to FC Fredericia.

== Managerial career ==
In October 2009, he signed on as an assistant coach at FC Fredericia. In May 2011 he became new manager of Otterup B&IK in the Danish 2nd Division West. In 2013, he stepped down as manager of Otterup to become new manager of Dalum IF. His contract as Dalum manager was not renewed, when it ended in the summer of 2017. He then became manager of lower league club OKS. He has also played for Odense Boldklub.

In November 2017, he was appointed the new head coach of Næsby. He remained manager of the club for more than five years, before joining recently promoted Danish 2nd Division club Middelfart in June 2023, where he signed a two-year contract. In November 2024, he signed a contract for FC Roskilde, starting in January 2025.

In January 2026, Johannsen returned to Middelfart, signing as the clubs new manager.

== Personal life ==
He is also a teacher at Efterskolen Ved Nyborg (EVN) where he coaches the football line.

== Honours ==
Copenhagen

- Danish Super Cup: 1995
