= Lyngby Boldklub =

Association football club in Lyngby, Denmark

Lyngby
- Full name: Lyngby Boldklub af 1921
- Nicknames: De kongeblå (the royal blues), Vikingerne (the Vikings)
- Founded: 1921; 105 years ago
- Ground: Lyngby Stadion
- Capacity: 10,000 (3,111 seated)
- Chairman: Tommy Petersen; Friends of Lyngby
- Head coach: Andreas Bjelland & Mikkel Jespersen
- League: Danish Superliga
- 2025–26: Danish 1st Division, 1st of 12 (promoted)
- Website: lyngby-boldklub.dk
Home colours	Away colours

Lyngby Boldklub (Danish pronunciation: [ˈløŋˌpyˀ ˈpʌlˀtkʰlup]) is a professional football club founded in 1921, based in Lyngby, a suburb of Copenhagen, Denmark. The club plays its home games at Lyngby Stadion. The club will compete in the Danish Superliga from 2026–27 after promotion from Danish 1st Division in 2025–26. From 1994 to 2001 the club was known as Lyngby FC. The club has won the Danish championship twice (1983 and 1992) and the Danish Cup three times (1984, 1985 and 1990).

== History ==
The club was first founded on 8 April 1906 but it was disbanded again in 1915 due to problems with where they were allowed to play. On 30 March 1921, 30 young people from the football department of Lyngby IF decided to break away and start their own club. They named it Lyngby Boldklub af 1921. For the first few years, they played at Lundtofte Flyveplads, using the flight hangars as locker rooms. In 1949 the club moved to the area where the present-day Lyngby Stadion is located.

Lyngby was the first club in Denmark to wear the club's name on the kits, which happened in 1961. In 1983 the club became Danish champions for the first time and in 1984 the club played in the European Cup losing to Sparta Prague with 1–2,0–0 in the second round after beating KS Elbasani in the first round with 3–0,3–0. In 1986 the club was the first one to win its group in the UEFA Intertoto Cup without loss of points.

The club won its second Danish championship in 1992 on Gentofte Stadion. In 1996 the club was eliminated from the UEFA Cup by Club Brügge, even though playing a 1–1 draw in Belgium. 1996 was also the year when Lyngby's chairmen, Flemming Østergaard and Michael Kjær sold team captain Larsen to FC Copenhagen. The sale sparked harsh protests among the fans. In 1997 Østergaard and Kjær left Lyngby to become chairmen in FC Copenhagen. They were joined by striker Jónsson.

In December 2001 the club went bankrupt and was forced to finish the season using only amateur players. Hardly surprising, the team finished the season in last place and was subsequently relegated an additional two leagues due to the bankruptcy. As a result, the team went straight from playing in the Superliga to playing in the amateur league Danmarksserien, just below the three Danish pro leagues. In 2003 the team was promoted to the 2nd Division (the third best league), as winner of Danmarksserien, and on 18 June 2005 the team gained promotion to the 1st Division by finishing 3rd in the 2nd Division.

In the 2006–07 season the team won the Danish 1st Division thus returning to the top flight only five and a half seasons after going bankrupt. Another highlight of the 2006–07 season occurred on 12 April 2007 as Lyngby advanced to the semi-finals of the Danish Cup for the first time in several years, by winning 1–0 against AC Horsens on Lyngby Stadion.

In 2014, the squad was taken over by Hellerup Finans and its chairman, Torben Jensen, became also chairman of the squad.

Lyngby achieved a third place in the 2016-17 season, just a season after being promoted from the 1. Division. In the second half of the 2017-18 season, however, the club experienced financial difficulties, due to irregularities at the club owner, Hellerup Finans, which later went bankrupt. This led to the departure of several key players, before, on 9 February 2018, the club was bought and saved by a group of local business people and fans known collectively as Friends of Lyngby. This was not enough for Lyngby to hold its place in the Superliga, as the club lost two play-off matches against 1. Division number 3, Vendsyssel FF, being relegated to 1. Division. Just over a year later, on 2 June 2019, fortunes were reversed, as Lyngby, finishing 3rd in 2018-19 season in the 1st Division, won 3–2 on aggregate against Vendsyssel FF, securing its re-promotion to the top flight alongside Horsens. In the 2020-21 Superliga season, Lyngby ended in 11th place ahead of only Horsens, and was relegated back to 1st Division for the 2021-22 season. Lyngby was back in the Superliga for the 2022-23 season after winning promotion from the 1st Division, finishing the season ahead of Horsens and AaB, thereby surviving relegation despite suffering the season's longest winless streak of 16 games.

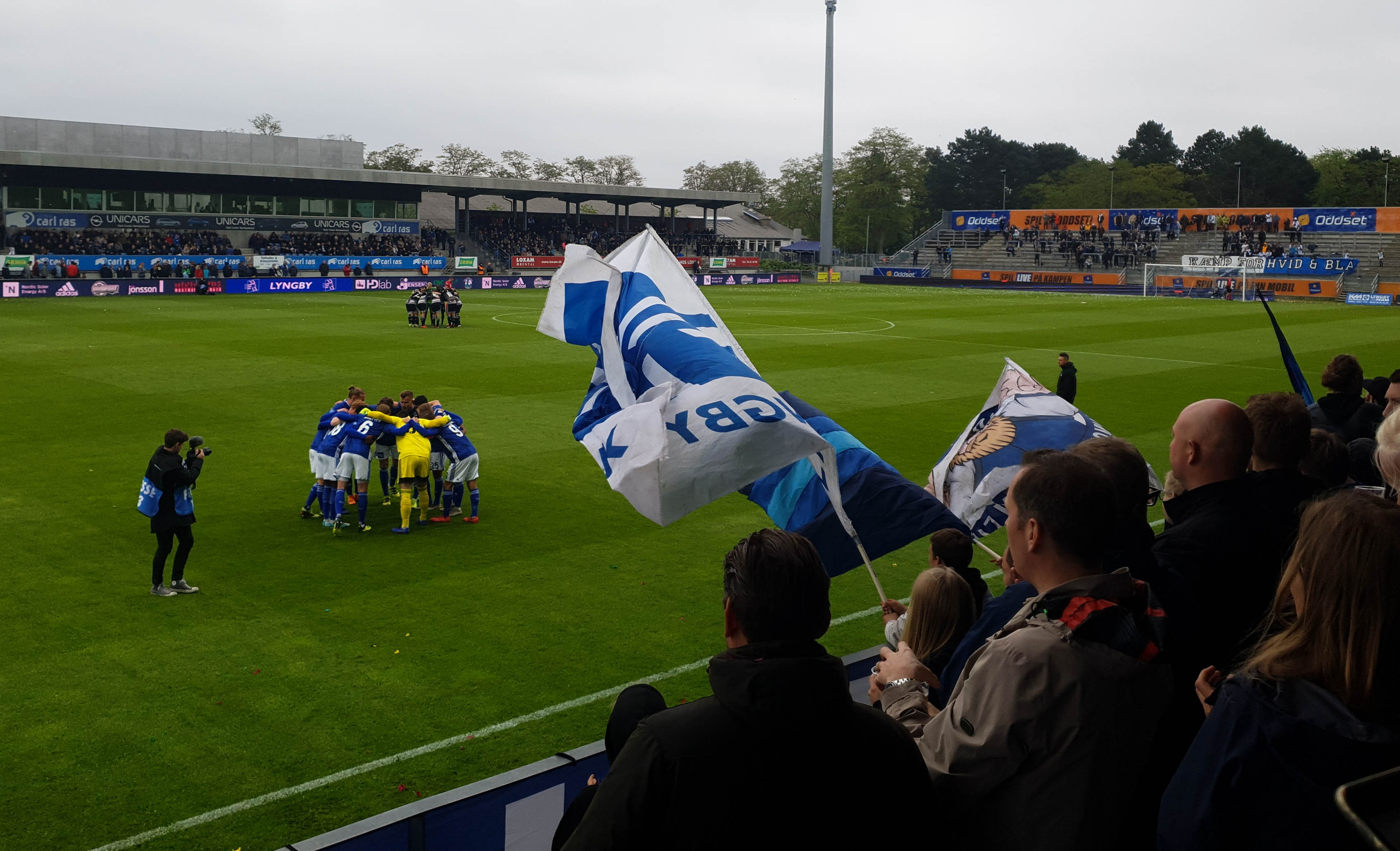
Lyngby BK's starting eleven gather moments before the first of two Superliga play-off matches against Vendsyssel FF (30 May 2019)

The 2023-24 season was an eventful one. In January 2024, the team experienced a managerial change when Freyr Alexandersson was signed by K.V. Kortrijk creating a vacancy. It was filled by Magne Hoseth who was fired after only 50 days and two games, opening the vacancy anew to be filled by David Nielsen. On 28 May 2024, it was announced that Philadelphia based Union Sports and Entertainment had entered into a strategic partnership with Lyngby Boldklub, also acquiring a minority stake in the club. The team ended the season in 8th place out of 12 teams and survived relegation.

Lyngby struggled in the 2024-25 season resulting in relegation back to the 1st Division ahead of the 2025-26 season.

Lyngby is currently leading the 1st division as of 16 April 2026 with 45 points in 24 games.

On 9 May 2026, Lyngby secure promotion to Superliga after defeat Hvidovre IF 0–2 at away games in Promotion round and return to top flight after one year absence.

== Honours ==
- Danish Champions
  - Winner (2): 1983, 1991–92
  - Runners-up (3): 1981, 1985, 1991
  - 3rd place (4): 1984, 1988, 1989, 2016–17
- Danish Cup
  - Winner (3): 1983–84, 1984–85, 1989–90
  - Runners-up (2): 1969–70, 1979–80
- Danish 1st Division
  - Winner (3): 2006–07, 2015–16, 2025–26
  - Runners-up (3): 1979, 2009–10, 2021–22
  - 3rd place (3): 2005–06, 2014–15, 2018–19
- Zealand Series
  - Winner (9): 1946–47, 1952–53, 1956–57, 1959, 1969^{‡}, 1973^{‡}, 1975^{‡}, 1980^{‡}, 2005^{‡}
  - Runners-up (4): 1941–42, 1943–44, 1948–49, 1949–50

^{‡}: Won by reserve team

== Achievements ==
- 23 seasons in the Highest Danish League
- 7 seasons in the Second Highest Danish League
- 17 seasons in the Third Highest Danish League

== European record ==
Season	Competition	Round	Club	Home	Away	Aggregate
1982–83	UEFA Cup	1R	(Sweden) Brage	1–2	2–2	3–4
1984–85	European Cup	1R	(Albania) Labinoti Elbasani	3–0	3–0	6–0
1984–85	European Cup	2R	(Czechoslovakia) Sparta Praha	0–0	1–2	1–2
1985–86	UEFA Cup Winners' Cup	1R	(Republic of Ireland) Galway United	1–0	3–2	4–2
1985–86	UEFA Cup Winners' Cup	2R	(Socialist Federal Republic of Yugoslavia) Red Star Belgrade	2–2	1–3	3–5
1986–87	UEFA Cup	1R	(Switzerland) Neuchâtel Xamax	0–2	1–3	1–5
1990–91	UEFA Cup Winners' Cup	1R	(Wales) Wrexham	0–1	0–0	0–1
1992–93	UEFA Champions League	1R	(Scotland) Rangers	0–2	0–1	0–3
1996–97	UEFA Cup	QR	(Slovenia) Mura	0–0	2–0	2–0
1996–97	UEFA Cup	1R	(Belgium) Club Brugge	1–1	0–2	1–3
1999–2000	UEFA Cup	QR	(Malta) Birkirkara	7–0	0–0	7–0
1999–2000	UEFA Cup	1R	(Russia) Lokomotiv Moscow	1–2	0–3	1–5
2017–18	UEFA Europa League	1QR	(Wales) Bangor City	1–0	3–0	4–0
2017–18	UEFA Europa League	2QR	(Slovakia) Slovan Bratislava	2–1	1–0	3–1
2017–18	UEFA Europa League	3QR	(Russia) Krasnodar	1–3	1–2	2–5

== Players ==
=== Current squad ===
As of 8 September 2026

Note: Flags indicate national team as defined under FIFA eligibility rules; some limited exceptions apply. Players may hold more than one non-FIFA nationality.

No.	Pos.	Nation	Player
1	GK	DEN	Jonathan Ægidius
2	DF	DEN	Oskar Buur
4	DF	DEN	Cornelius Allen
5	MF	DEN	Oliver Højer (on loan from Copenhagen)
6	DF	ISL	Daníel Kristjánsson
7	MF	CAN	Simon Colyn
8	MF	DEN	Mathias Hebo (captain)
10	FW	ISL	Ísak Þorvaldsson
12	DF	ISL	Davíd Helgi Aronsson
14	MF	DEN	Lauge Sandgrav
16	MF	DEN	Zidan Sertdemir
17	MF	DEN	William Steindorsson

No.	Pos.	Nation	Player
18	MF	DEN	Jens Jakob Thomasen
19	MF	DEN	Gustav Fraulo
21	GK	DEN	Oskar Snorre
22	MF	DEN	Sanders Ngabo (on loan from Häcken)
24	DF	ZIM	Munashe Garananga (on loan from Copenhagen)
25	DF	BEL	Renzo Tytens
26	FW	DEN	Frederik Gytkjær
27	DF	FIN	Arttu Hoskonen
30	DF	DEN	Mikkel Fischer
31	GK	USA	Diego Kochen (on loan from Barcelona Atlètic)
35	FW	USA	Markus Anderson (on loan from Philadelphia Union)
40	GK	ISL	Jón Sölvi Símonarson (on loan from ÍA)

=== Out on loan ===
Note: Flags indicate national team as defined under FIFA eligibility rules; some limited exceptions apply. Players may hold more than one non-FIFA nationality.

No.	Pos.	Nation	Player
11	MF	DEN	Magnus Warming (at HB Køge until 30 June 2027)
20	MF	DEN	Mathias Kaarsbo (at IL Hødd until 31 December 2026)

No.	Pos.	Nation	Player
23	MF	DEN	Aksel Jørgensen (at Sandnes Ulf until 31 December 2026)
28	DF	DEN	Malthe Henriksen (at Sandnes Ulf until 31 December 2026)

=== Former players ===
Among former players are former Danish internationals Flemming Christensen, John Helt, Klaus Berggreen, Ronnie Ekelund, Torben Frank, Jakob Friis-Hansen, Henrik Larsen, Miklos Molnar, Claus "Kuno" Christiansen, Carsten Fredgaard, Claus Jensen, Bent Christensen, Peter Nielsen, Niclas Jensen, Dennis Rommedahl, Thomas Kristensen, Morten Nordstrand, Anders Christiansen, Mikkel Beckmann, Christian Nørgaard and Yussuf Poulsen. Swedish international Marcus Allbäck briefly played for the club in the late 1990s. Four Lyngby players were on the Danish team that won the 1992 European Football Championship, while Rommedahl and Bechmann were included in the Danish squad for the World Cup in South Africa, 2010.

On 10 September 2021, Lyngby Boldklub celebrated their centenary by organising a Legends match. The match was played by former notable players including Miklos Molnar, Klaus Berggreen, Henrik Larsen, and others who had played for the club in the past.

=== Youth players ===
Lyngby Boldklub is also renowned for its youth program, and several current and former A-international players started their careers in Lyngby. These include Yussuf Poulsen, Christian Nørgaard, Frederik Sørensen, Christian Gytkjær, Andreas Bjelland, Lasse Schöne, Morten Nordstrand, Dennis Rommedahl and Thomas Kristensen. Though Niclas Jensen started his career in B 93 his career didn't really take off until he joined Lyngby in 1992 aged 18.

=== Old boys ===
In the mid-2000s, the club's Old Boys team was among the best in Denmark featuring several well-known players such as Michael Laudrup, Brian Laudrup and aforementioned Berggreen and Larsen.

== Season-by-season results ==
Season	Pos	Pts	Pld	W	D	L	GF	GA	GD
26-27: Superligaen	#TBD/12	0
25–26: 1. Division	#1/12	57	29	17	6	6	65	31	34
24–25: Superligaen	#11/12	27	32	5	12	15	26	43	-17
23-24: Superligaen	#10/12	36	32	9	9	14	39	53	-14
22-23: Superligaen	#10/12	28	32	6	10	16	30	49	-19
21–22: 1. Division	#2/12	63	32	18	9	5	62	29	33
20–21: Superligaen	#11/12	26	32	6	8	18	36	63	-27
19–20: Superligaen	#11/14	34	32	9	7	16	34	54	-20
18–19: 1. Division	#3/12	52	33	15	7	11	51	47	+4
17-18: Superligaen	#14/14	23	32	4	11	17	35	65	-30
16–17: Superligaen	#3/14	58	36	17	7	12	42	35	+7
15–16: 1. Division	#1/12	64	33	19	7	7	59	37	+22
14–15: 1. Division	#3/12	51	33	14	9	10	49	37	+12
13–14: 1. Division	#3/12	57	33	18	3	12	58	41	+18
12–13: 1. Division	#4/12	56	33	17	5	11	55	42	+13
11-12: Superligaen	#11/12	28	33	8	4	21	32	60	−28
10–11: SAS Ligaen	#8/12	38	33	10	8	15	42	52	−10
09-10: Viasat Sport Divisionen	#2/16	62	30	19	5	6	59	39	+20
08-09: Viasat Sport Divisionen	#6/16	50	30	14	8	8	50	26	+24
07-08: SAS Ligaen	#12/12	18	33	3	9	21	33	69	−36
06-07: Viasat Sport Divisionen	#1/16	64	30	19	7	4	71	43	+28
05-06: Viasat Sport Divisionen	#3/16	59	30	18	5	7	68	44	+24
04-05: 2. Division	#3/16	58	30	18	4	8	67	32	+35
03-04: 2. Division	#11/16	37	30	9	10	11	51	62	−11
02-03: Danmarksserien 1	#1/16	72	30	23	3	4	84	37	+47
01-02: SAS Ligaen	#12/12	15	33	2	9	22	25	92	−67
00-01: Faxe Kondi Ligaen	#9/12	44	33	12	8	13	40	53	−13
99-00: Faxe Kondi Ligaen	#7/12	47	33	14	5	14	51	55	−4
98–99: Faxe Kondi Ligaen	#4/12	52	33	14	10	9	55	60	−5
97–98: Faxe Kondi Ligaen	#6/12	45	33	13	6	14	53	62	−9
96–97: Faxe Kondi Ligaen	#9/12	40	33	10	10	13	50	61	−11
95–96: Coca-Cola Superligaen	#4/12	53	33	14	8	11	61	35	+26

Green denotes promotion, red denotes relegation.

== Former coaches ==
- (Denmark) Jørgen Hvidemose (1981–87)
- (Denmark) Hans Brun Larsen (1987)
- (Denmark) Kim Lyshøj (1987–90)
- (Sweden) Kent Karlsson (1991–92)
- (Denmark) Michael Schäfer (1992–95)
- (Sweden) Benny Lennartsson (1995–98)
- (Denmark) Poul Hansen (1998–01)
- (Denmark) Hasse Kuhn (2001–03)
- (Denmark) Bent Christensen (2003–05)
- (Denmark) Kasper Hjulmand (2006–08)
- (Denmark) Henrik Larsen (2008–09)
- (Denmark) Niels Frederiksen (2009–13)
- (Denmark) Johan Lange (2013)
- (Denmark) Jack Majgaard (2013–15)
- (Denmark) Søren Hermansen (2015) (interim)
- (Denmark) David Nielsen (2015–17)
- (Denmark) Thomas Nørgaard (2017–18)
- (Denmark) Mark Strudal (2018)
- (Denmark) Christian Nielsen (2018–20)
- (Denmark) Carit Falch (2020–21)
- (Iceland) Freyr Alexandersson (2021–24)
- (Norway) Magne Hoseth (2024)
- (Denmark) David Nielsen (2024)
- (Denmark) Morten Karlsen (2024–Present)

== Logo ==
1994-2024

Since 2024
