= Kolding IF =

Danish football club

- Full name: Kolding Idræts Forening
- Nickname: De blå-hvide (The blue-whites)
- Founded: 1895; 131 years ago, as Kolding Fodsports Klub
- Ground: Autocentralen Park
- Capacity: 10,000 (2,197 seated)
- Chairman: Claus Holm-Søberg
- Manager: Karl Marius Askum
- League: Danish 1st Division
- 2025–26: Danish 1st Division, 6th of 12
- Website: https://www.kif-fodbold.dk/
Home colours	Away colours

Kolding Idræts Forening, commonly known as Kolding IF, is a Danish professional association football club based in the city of Kolding, Southern Denmark. The team competes in the Danish 1st Division, the second tier of the Danish football league system.

Founded in 1895, Kolding IF is one of Denmark's oldest football clubs and has participated in the top flight on two occasions, during the 1982 and 1983 seasons. In 2002, the club entered into a joint first-team collaboration with local rivals Kolding Boldklub, forming Kolding FC. This arrangement lasted until 2011, when Kolding FC merged with Vejle Boldklub to create Vejle Boldklub Kolding. Following the dissolution of the merger in 2013, Kolding IF resumed independent operations and re-established its own senior team.

The club traditionally plays its home matches at Autocentralen Park (formerly known as Kolding Stadion) and wears white shirts with blue trim.

== Current squad ==
As of 3 September 2026

Note: Flags indicate national team as defined under FIFA eligibility rules; some limited exceptions apply. Players may hold more than one non-FIFA nationality.

No.	Pos.	Nation	Player
2	DF	DEN	Lasse Laursen
3	DF	DEN	Albert Nørager
4	MF	SVK	Filip Lesniak
5	DF	SWE	Gustav Friberg
6	MF	DEN	Mikkel Lynge
7	MF	DEN	Tobias Augustinus-Jensen
8	DF	DEN	Aksel Halsgaard
9	FW	USA	Nebiyou Perry
11	MF	PAK	Abdul Arshad
15	DF	DEN	Anton Klaster
17	FW	CAF	Sterling Yatéké
18	FW	BLR	Vladislav Morozov
19	MF	DEN	Hans Høllsberg

No.	Pos.	Nation	Player
20	MF	ISL	Daniel Jóhannesson (on loan from Nordsjælland)
21	DF	DEN	Magnus Døj
22	MF	DEN	Isak Tånnander
23	MF	DEN	Niels Morberg
24	MF	EST	Markus Soomets
27	GK	UKR	Kyrylo Shushman
28	GK	SVK	Adam Danko
29	DF	DEN	Jonas Hansen
33	DF	AUT	Pascal Estrada
42	MF	SEN	Papa Thome (on loan from Midtjylland)
45	MF	CIV	Yacouba Ouattara (on loan from Midtjylland)
99	GK	DEN	Tobias Elnegaard
—	GK	IRI	Nima Mirzazad

=== Youth players in use 2026–27 ===
Note: Flags indicate national team as defined under FIFA eligibility rules; some limited exceptions apply. Players may hold more than one non-FIFA nationality.

No.	Pos.	Nation	Player

=== Out on loan ===
Note: Flags indicate national team as defined under FIFA eligibility rules; some limited exceptions apply. Players may hold more than one non-FIFA nationality.

No.	Pos.	Nation	Player
30	DF	GER	Eric Voufack (at TSV Havelse until 30 June 2027)

== Noted players ==
- 1950s–60s: Jørgen Lildballe (1955), holds the record for most first team matches – 386.
- 1980s: Jan Mølby (1981), played on the Danish national team, and went to European top clubs afterwards.

== Achievements ==
- Danish 2nd Division
  - Winners (1): 2022–23
- Jutland Championships
  - Winners (2): 1930–31, 1935–36
  - Runners-up (6): 1905, 1906, 1907, 1908, 1909, 1942
- Jutland Cup
  - Runners-up (1): 1939–40

== See also ==
- Kolding FC
- Kolding Boldklub
