= Denmark–Sweden football rivalry =

Football rivalry between the national football teams Denmark and Sweden

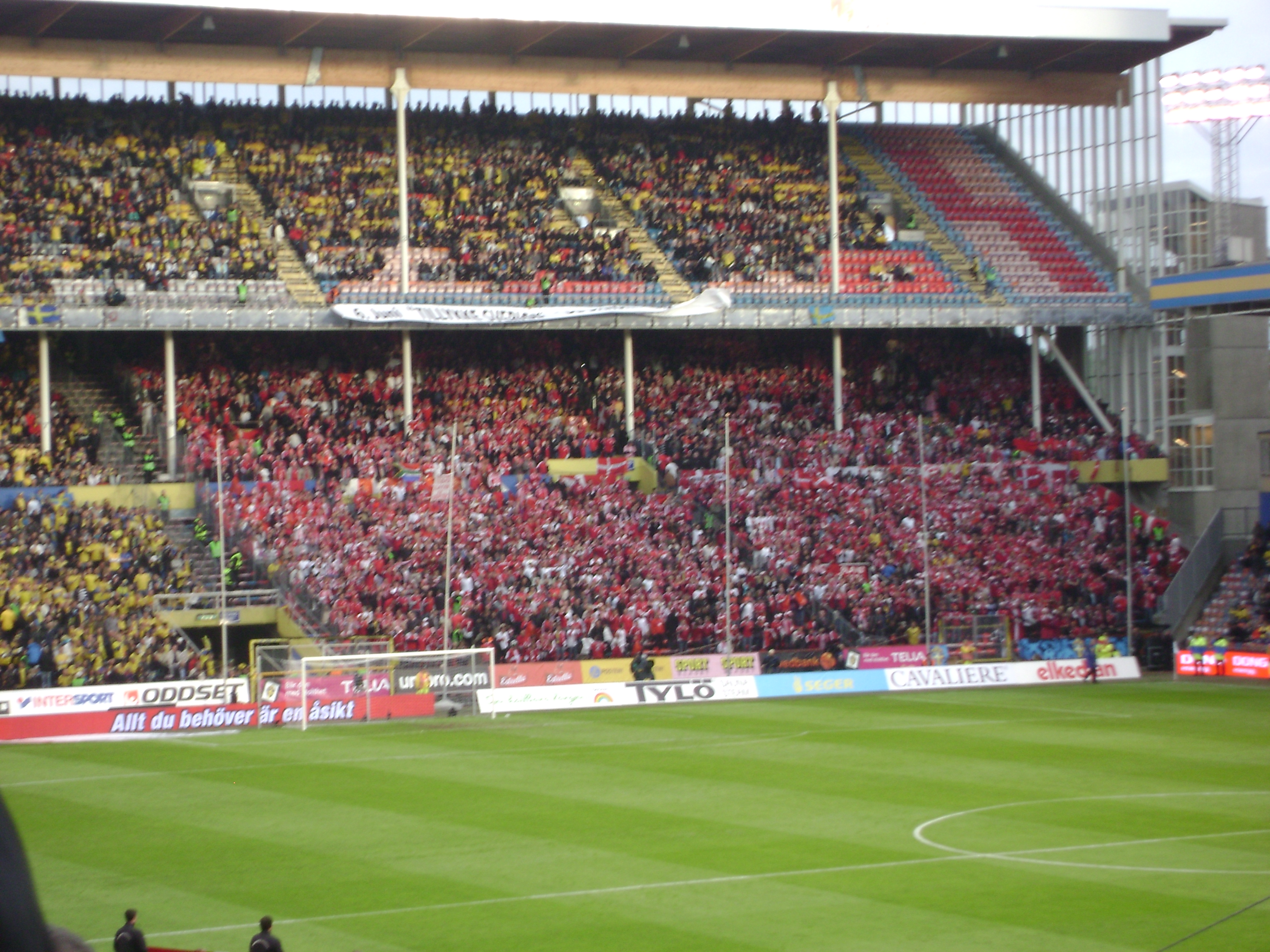
- Sweden fans (in yellow) and Denmark fans (in red) during a clash in 2009.
- Location: Europe (UEFA)
- Teams: Denmark; Sweden
- First meeting: 25 May 1913; Denmark 8–0 Sweden (Copenhagen, Denmark)
- Latest meeting: 5 June 2024; Denmark 2–1 Sweden (Copenhagen, Denmark)

Statistics
- Total meetings: 109
- Most wins: Sweden (46)
- All-time record: Sweden wins: 46; Denmark wins: 43; Draws: 20
- Largest victory: Sweden 0–10 Denmark (Stockholm, Sweden; 5 October 1913)
- Largest goal scoring: Sweden 0–10 Denmark (Stockholm, Sweden; 5 October 1913)
- Longest win streak: Denmark (5): 1. (Denmark) 8–0 (Sweden) 25 May 1913, Copenhagen; 2. (Sweden) 0–10 (Denmark) 5 October 1913, Stockholm; 3. (Denmark) 2–0 (Sweden) 6 June 1915, Copenhagen; 4. (Sweden) 0–2 (Denmark) 31 October 1915, Solna; 5. (Denmark) 2–0 (Sweden) 4 June 1916, Copenhagen
- Longest unbeaten streak: Sweden (14)

The Denmark–Sweden football rivalry is a highly competitive sports rivalry that exists between the national men's football teams of Denmark and Sweden. The clashes between the two neighbouring countries has since the very first match in 1913 attracted large crowds that have witnessed several spectacular games and controversial incidents, despite the fact that the two teams very seldom have met in any of the larger international football tournaments. Sweden leads the series 46–20–43.

== Memorable competitive matches ==
=== Euro 1992 group match ===
Hosting the 1992 European Championships, Sweden was playing in only its second-ever game in the tournament's history when they faced Denmark at Råsunda Stadium in Solna. A goal from Tomas Brolin was enough to give Sweden its first-ever Euro victory with a 1–0 win over Denmark. Sweden finished ahead of Denmark in the group, but Denmark would go on to win the tournament.

UEFA Euro 1992
14 June 1992
20:15 CEST
Group 1

Sweden	1–0	Denmark
Andersson (yellow card) 40'; Brolin 58'	Report	Andersen (yellow card) 14'

Råsunda Stadium, Stockholm
Attendance: 29,902
Referee: Aron Schmidhuber (Germany)

=== Euro 2004 group match ===
UEFA Euro 2004 Group C standings after 2 matches
Team	Pld	GF	GA	Pts
Sweden	2	6	1	4
Denmark	2	2	0	4
Italy	2	1	1	2
Bulgaria	2	0	7	0

Final tiebreaker standings
	SWE	DEN	ITA	GF	GA	Pts
(Sweden)	–	2–2	1–1	3	3	2
(Denmark)	2–2	–	0–0	2	2	2
(Italy)	1–1	0–0	–	1	1	2

In the group stage of the UEFA Euro 2004 tournament, the two teams met each other for the first competitive game since the UEFA Euro 1992 group stage, and the first rivalry game since April 2000.

Prior to the game on 22 June 2004, the group C standings were as shown in the adjacent table. Simultaneously with the game, Italy faced Bulgaria. With a win, Italy would advance from the group stage, unless Denmark and Sweden drew their game, causing all three teams to end with five points. The tiebreaker would then be the match results between the tied teams, and with Sweden playing 1–1 and Denmark 0–0 with Italy, a Denmark-Sweden draw of 2–2 or higher would leave Italy with one goal from the tied matches, and send both Sweden and Denmark through to the quarter finals, regardless of the Italian side's efforts.

After a 28th-minute opener by Jon Dahl Tomasson, Henrik Larsson equalised on a penalty shortly after the break. Tomasson brought Denmark one up again in the 66th minute, but just minutes before the final whistle, Mattias Jonson equalised for Sweden to make up the final score of 2–2.

The Italians, meanwhile, had beaten Bulgaria by 2–1 on a goal in the fourth minute of stoppage time, which would have otherwise sent them through. This caused an uproar within the Italian team, with goalkeeper Gianluigi Buffon and Italian football federation president Franco Carraro both accusing the Danish and Swedish team of match fixing. However then-Italian manager Giovanni Trapattoni said that neither he nor the federation would protest against the result. UEFA did not investigate the case.

UEFA Euro 2004
22 June 2004
19:45 WEST
Group C

Denmark	2–2	Sweden
Tomasson 28', 66'	Report	Edman (yellow card) 36'; Larsson 47' (pen.); Källström (yellow card) 63'; Jonson 89'

Estádio do Bessa, Porto
Attendance: 26,115
Referee: Markus Merk (Germany)

=== Abandoned 2008 Euro qualifier ===
The next rivalry games came in the UEFA Euro 2008 qualification group games. The first game was played on 2 June 2007, and started out with the Swedish side going three goals up after two goals from Johan Elmander and one from Petter Hansson in the first half-hour of the game. However, through goals by Daniel Agger, Jon Dahl Tomasson and Leon Andreasen, Denmark completed a remarkable comeback.

In the 89th minute, Denmark's Christian Poulsen hit Markus Rosenberg in the stomach, prompting German referee Herbert Fandel to send him off and award Sweden a penalty kick. Before the penalty kick could be executed, a Danish supporter ran unto the pitch and attempted to punch Fandel, but was stopped by Denmark's Michael Gravgaard. Fandel abandoned the match, Sweden was awarded the match as a 3–0 win, and Denmark was sentenced to play its next two qualifying matches at least 140 km away from Copenhagen. The two teams met for the re-match on 8 September 2007 in Stockholm, which ended in a 0–0 draw. Sweden eventually qualified for the UEFA Euro 2008, while Denmark finished fourth in the group and was eliminated.

UEFA Euro 2008 qualifying
2 June 2007
20:00 CEST
Group F

Denmark	0–3 awarded	Sweden
Agger 34'; Tomasson 62'; Andreasen 75' (yellow card) 77'; Poulsen (red card) 89'	Report	Elmander 7', 26' (yellow card) 38'; Hansson 23'; Alexandersson (yellow card) 44'; Linderoth (yellow card) 84'

Telia Parken, Copenhagen
Attendance: 42,083
Referee: Herbert Fandel (Germany)

=== 2010 FIFA World Cup qualifiers ===
The two teams were once more drawn in the same group for the 2010 FIFA World Cup qualification. On 6 June 2009, Denmark defeated Sweden 1–0 in Solna, the first victory for Denmark over Sweden since 1996. Sweden's Kim Källström was given a penalty early in the game, but Thomas Sørensen saved the shot. Denmark's Thomas Kahlenberg scored the only goal in the 22nd minute after a defensive mistake by Mikael Nilsson.

The 10 October 2009 re-match was the first rivalry game at Parken Stadium since the controversial fan attack incident. During the game, Sweden had two goals correctly annulled for offside, before Denmark's Jakob Poulsen scored the only goal in the 78th minute. Denmark won the game 1–0, and secured Danish qualification for the 2010 FIFA World Cup, while Sweden eventually finished third and were eliminated.

2010 FIFA World Cup qualification
6 June 2009
20:00 CEST
Group 1

Sweden	0–1	Denmark
Källström (yellow card) 43'	Report	Rommedahl (yellow card) 18'; Kahlenberg 22'; Jacobsen (yellow card) 89'; Sørensen (yellow card) 90'

Råsunda Stadium, Stockholm
Attendance: 33,619
Referee: Mike Riley (England)
10 October 2009
20:00 CEST
Group 1

Denmark	1–0	Sweden
Poulsen 78'	Report

Telia Parken, Copenhagen
Attendance: 37,800
Referee: Manuel Mejuto González (Spain)

=== 2016 UEFA Euro qualifying play-offs ===
Once again both rivals faced for a spot in 2016 UEFA Euro, with Sweden the first leg at home by 2–1 with a 45th-minute goal from Emil Forsberg and a penalty converted by Zlatan Ibrahimović on 50th minute, Nicolai Jørgensen scored for Denmark on the 89th minute.

The return fixture in Denmark saw a 2–2 draw, Ibrahimović scored a brace, scoring in 19th and 76th minute respectively. Yussuf Poulsen opened scoring for Denmark with a goal at the 82nd minute and Jannik Vestergaard scored one at the last minute of the game. Sweden won 4–3 on aggregate.

14 November 2015
20:45
(20:45 UTC+1)

Sweden	2–1	Denmark
Forsberg 45'; Ibrahimović 50' (pen.)	Report	Jørgensen 80'

Friends Arena, Solna
Attendance: 49,053
Referee: Nicola Rizzoli (Italy)
17 November 2015
20:45
(20:45 UTC+1)

Denmark	2–2	Sweden
Y. Poulsen 82'; Vestergaard 90+1'	Report	Ibrahimović 19', 76'

Telia Parken, Copenhagen
Attendance: 36,051
Referee: Martin Atkinson (England)

Sweden won 4–3 on aggregate and qualified for UEFA Euro 2016.

== Comparison of Denmark and Sweden in major international tournaments ==
Key

Denotes which team finished better in that particular competition.
DNQ: Did not qualify.
DNP: Did not participate.
TBD: To be determined.

Tournament	Denmark	Sweden	Notes
1930 World Cup	DNP		
1934 World Cup	DNP	5-8	
1938 World Cup	DNP	4	
1950 World Cup	DNP	3	
1954 World Cup	DNP	FTQ	
1958 World Cup	FTQ	2	
1960 Euros	DNP		
1962 World Cup	DNP	FTQ	
1964 Euros	4	FTQ	
1966 World Cup	FTQ	FTQ	
1968 Euros	FTQ	FTQ	
1970 World Cup	FTQ	9–16	
1972 Euros	FTQ		
1974 World Cup	FTQ	5–8	
1976 Euros	FTQ		
1978 World Cup	FTQ	9–16	
1980 Euros	FTQ		
1982 World Cup	FTQ		
1984 Euros	4	FTQ	
1986 World Cup	9–16	FTQ	
1988 Euros	5–8	FTQ	
1990 World Cup	FTQ	17–24	
1992 Euros	1	3-4	Denmark and Sweden were placed in the same finals group, Sweden won 1–0.
1994 World Cup	FTQ	3	
1996 Euros	9–16	FTQ	
1998 World Cup	5–8	FTQ	
2000 Euros	9–16		
2002 World Cup	9–16		
2004 Euros	5–8		Denmark and Sweden were placed in the same finals group. The teams drew 2–2 and both progressed to the knockout round.
2006 World Cup	FTQ	9–16	
2008 Euros	FTQ	9–16	Denmark and Sweden were placed in the same qualifying group. The match in Denmark was abandoned at 3–3 after a Danish fan attacked the referee, which threw the result 3–0 to Sweden. The teams drew 0–0 in the reverse fixture.
2010 World Cup	17–32	FTQ	Denmark and Sweden were placed in the same qualifying group. Denmark won both matches against Sweden 1–0.
2012 Euros	9–16		
2014 World Cup	FTQ		
2016 Euros	FTQ	17–24	Denmark and Sweden were placed in the same match in the playoffs. Sweden defeated Denmark 4–3 on aggregate.
2018 World Cup	9–16	5–8	
2020 Euros	3–4	9–16	
2022 World Cup	17-32	FTQ	
2024 Euros	9–16	FTQ	

== Statistics ==
Tournament	Pld	Den wins	Draws	Swe wins	Den goals	Swe goals
World Cup	0	0	0	0	0	0
World Cup qualifying	2	2	0	0	2	0
European Championship	2	0	1	1	2	3
European Championship qualifying	4	0	2	2	6	7
Olympic tournament	1	0	0	1	2	4
Nordic Championship	49	15	9	25	78	104
Exhibition games	4	1	0	3	7	12
Friendly matches	46	24	8	14	82	57
Decade	Pld	Den wins	Draws	Swe wins	Den goals	Swe goals
1910s	12	9	1	2	35	10
1920s	10	5	2	3	17	10
1930s	10	5	0	5	24	24
1940s	17	4	4	9	30	45
1950s	11	1	3	7	18	35
1960s	10	1	2	7	18	35
1970s	11	3	3	5	11	16
1980s	8	5	1	2	13	7
1990s	6	3	0	3	3	8
2000s	6	2	2	2	4	6
2010s	5	2	2	1	6	4
2020s	2	2	0	0	4	1
Place	Pld	Den wins	Draws	Swe wins	Den goals	Swe goals
In Denmark	51	25	8	18	101	82
In Sweden	54	17	11	26	71	97
Neutral ground	3	0	1	2	4	8
Total	108	42	20	46	176	187

== See also ==
- Battle of Jutland – rivalry between the Danish teams Aalborg BK and Aarhus GF
- Copenhagen Derby – rivalry between the Danish teams Brøndby IF and F.C. Copenhagen
- Football derbies in Sweden
- Denmark–Sweden relations
