= Denmark v Sweden (UEFA Euro 2008 qualifying) =

Denmark v Sweden (2007)
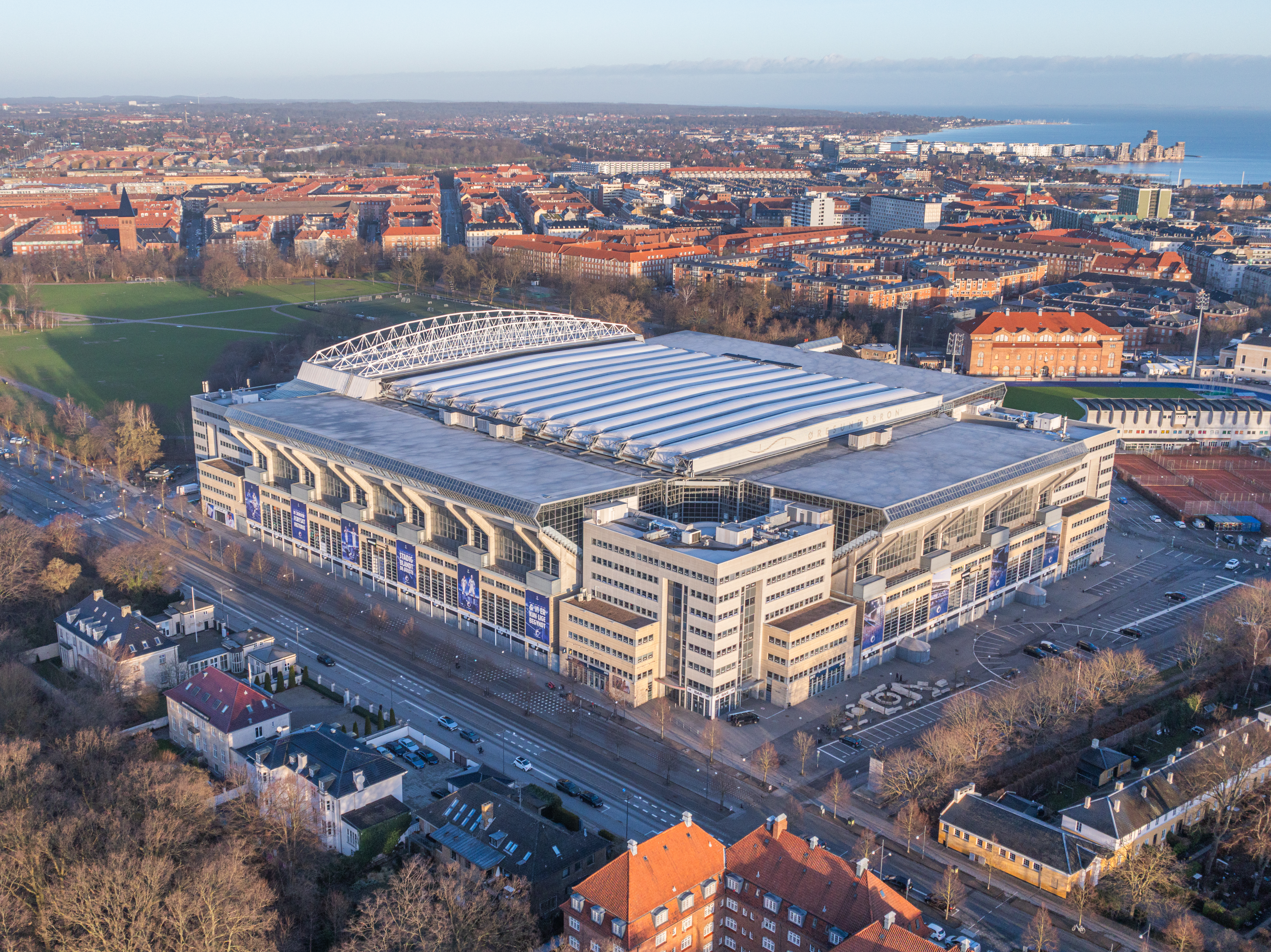
- The Parken Stadium in Copenhagen hosted the match
- Event: UEFA Euro 2008 qualifying Group F Matchday 8
Denmark	Sweden
0	3
- Match abandoned at 3–3 after 89 minutes Sweden awarded 3–0 victory (Note: The Denmark v Sweden match was abandoned in the 89th minute with the score at 3–3, following a fan attack on the referee. UEFA awarded the match as a 3–0 forfeit win to Sweden following a hearing on 8 June 2007.)
- Date: 2 June 2007
- Venue: Parken Stadium, Copenhagen
- Referee: Herbert Fandel (Germany)
- Attendance: 42,083
- Weather: Scattered clouds 15 °C (59 °F); 73% humidity

A fan attack occurred at the Euro 2008 qualifying Group F match between the national football teams of Sweden and Denmark, at the Parken Stadium in Copenhagen on 2 June 2007. A Danish supporter ran onto the pitch and attacked referee Herbert Fandel, after the referee had awarded Sweden a penalty in the 89th minute of the match and sent off Danish midfielder Christian Poulsen for punching Swedish striker Markus Rosenberg in the stomach.

The match was subsequently abandoned, and on 8 June 2007, UEFA held a hearing, awarding Sweden the match 3–0 and banning Poulsen for three competitive matches, and giving other punishments relating to Denmark international matches. The decision was appealed by the Danish Football Association and reduced on 5 July 2007. A CHF 100,000 (€66,000) fine was lowered to CHF 50,000; also, Denmark's two subsequent matches needed to be played at least 140 kilometres (87 mi) from Copenhagen.

The match was the first ever UEFA qualifying fixture between rivals Sweden and Denmark, and the first time a UEFA championship qualifier or any qualifier was abandoned due to spectator interference.

== Summary ==
2008 UEFA qualifier fan attack
- Location: Parken Stadium, Copenhagen, Denmark
- Date: 2 June 2007; 21:50 (CEST)
- Target: Herbert Fandel
- Attack type: Assault
- Perpetrator: Ronni Nörvig

Sweden were leading 3–0 after 26 minutes of the Group F game, but Denmark had fought back to 3–3 before the incident occurred.

=== Poulsen–Rosenberg incident ===
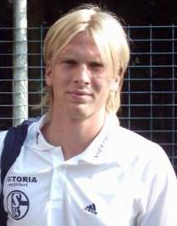
Christian Poulsen

In the 89th minute, Denmark's Christian Poulsen and Sweden's Markus Rosenberg engaged in a tussle in the Danish penalty area; Rosenberg struck Poulsen, who in turn punched Rosenberg in the stomach. After conferring with his assistant referee, referee Herbert Fandel sent off Poulsen and awarded Sweden a penalty, which was never taken.

=== Fan attack ===
Seconds later, a Danish fan rushed onto the field and attacked the referee, grabbed his neck, but was intercepted by the Danish defender Michael Gravgaard shortly after. Immediately following this, Fandel and his officiating crew walked off the field, and Danish Football Association spokesman Lars Berendt within minutes announced Sweden was awarded a 3–0 victory. After both teams left the pitch a second Danish fan took the ball from the penalty spot and ran across the stadium before scoring in Sweden's empty net. Shortly before the announcement a third fan ran across the pitch.

=== Perpetrator ===
Immediately after the incident, some Danish news media launched unprecedented rewards petitions for information about the perpetrator. Screenshot from Ekstrabladet.dk online. It reads: "Do you know the crook? This man is responsible for Denmark's loss against Sweden. If you know who he is, please write to Ekstra Bladet".

The attacker was identified as a 29-year-old Dane named Ronni Nörvig in German media (a transcription of his actual name, Ronni Nørvig), living and working in Gothenburg, Sweden. Publication of his name in Denmark was censored, due to a Danish court order. Prior to that, his full name and residential status was published in online edition of the Danish tabloid B.T., which, among other newspapers, ran an unprecedented petition asking the public for assistance to identify him. The Danish newspaper Ekstra Bladet has identified him by the initial "R", while other news media decided not to publish his name citing "the serious threat" against him.

== Aftermath ==
=== UEFA action against Danish FA ===
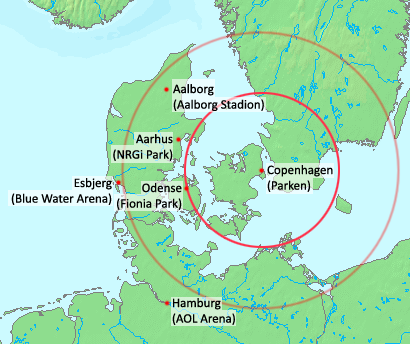
Map with approximate 140 and 250 km (87 and 155 mi) radii from Copenhagen, with relevant stadiums shown: Parken, Copenhagen – the site of the incident; Fionia Park, Odense (141 km or 88 mi from Parken) – site of a 2006 Denmark friendly match against Poland; NRGi Park, Aarhus (147 km or 91 mi from Parken) – site of a 2006 Denmark friendly match against Paraguay; chosen as the site for the two matches; Aalborg Stadion, Aalborg (224 km or 139 mi from Parken) – mentioned as an alternative; Blue Water Arena, Esbjerg (261 km or 162 mi from Parken) – mentioned as the only real option within Denmark and outside the 250 km (160 mi) perimeter; AOL Arena, Hamburg (288 km or 179 mi from Parken) – mentioned as an alternative outside Denmark

The result was not confirmed until an investigation by UEFA's disciplinary committee was carried out. The hearing took place on 8 June 2007 to officially confirm whether the match should be forfeited 3–0 to Sweden as Lars Berendt previously stated. The Danish Football Association (DBU) suspended ticket sales for its next two European qualifiers at Parken Stadium pending UEFA's decision. It had already sold 18,200 tickets for 12 September match against Liechtenstein, but said it would reimburse fans if UEFA changed the venue.

On 8 June 2007, the hearing was held, afterward, they awarded Sweden a 3–0 win, fining Denmark CHF 100,000 (€66,000), plus the punishment that Denmark should play their next four home qualification matches (the rest of qualifiers) at least 250 kilometres (160 mi) away from Copenhagen, with the next match against Liechtenstein behind closed doors. Poulsen was banned for three competitive matches.

The president of the Swedish Football Association, Lars-Åke Lagrell, expressed his satisfaction with the ruling calling it "a clear decision", adding that "there were no alternatives". The Danish FA immediately announced its intention to appeal. Jim Stjerne Hansen, secretary general of the DBU, said he was "shocked by the scope of the rulings", and that "It seems that they didn't look at the geography when they made their decision. Denmark is a small country."

Two of the three members of UEFA's disciplinary committee gave press interviews following the decision. Joël Wollf, General Secretary of the Luxembourg Football Federation and committee member, said:

The 250 kilometers were just to make sure that they would play away from Copenhagen. [...] My opinion is that it should be made possible for these matches to be played in Denmark. I have not seen the ruling in writing, so I don't know what it says.

Rainer Koch, German member of UEFA's disciplinary committee:

Denmark can just play in Aalborg. They have a race track (sic) up there, don't they? [...] Well I don't know the distances in Denmark. This will be a matter of a discussion.

The distance between Aalborg and Copenhagen is 224 kilometres (139 mi), thus it was not a viable option at the time. Aalborg Stadium does not feature a race track.

=== Final UEFA ruling ===
On 5 July 2007 UEFA released the following statement:

The Appeals Body replaced the original verdict of the UEFA Control and Disciplinary Body and its decision was final: Sweden were awarded a 3–0 win by default; the DBU was fined CHF50,000 (€30,222); and the Parken Stadium in Copenhagen was closed for four official competition matches involving the senior national team. From this third sanction, two games were deferred for a probationary period of two years. The world governing body FIFA was notified about the deferred sanction and the period of probation. In addition, the requirement to play the next two games at least 250 kilometres (160 mi) from Copenhagen was reduced to 140 kilometres (87 mi).

== Reactions ==
=== To the match in general ===
Frederik, Crown Prince of Denmark, criticized the behaviour of both Christian Poulsen and the fan who attacked the referee: "It was terrible and a very embarrassing behavior on the Danish side."

=== To Christian Poulsen's behaviour ===
Copenhagen police spokesperson chief inspector Flemming Steen Munch gave the following comment:

It is about time to set an example ... It has almost become acceptable to be violent on the pitch, but violence should not be accepted on the pitch or in society. The TV images clearly show how the Swede is punched in the stomach. My immediate opinion is that according to the penal code the act will lead to a 30-day imprisonment.

Copenhagen police chief superintendent Per Larsen later said that all comments of possible charges were premature. "Football is a contact sport, so the starting point is that the sport's own courts should handle this," Larsen told Danish news agency Ritzau. Munch noted that it was "unusual" for violence on the field or hockey rink to be tried in a court of law. See violence in ice hockey for some exceptions.

The Danish Justice Minister, Lene Espersen, called for an involuntary national team-hiatus to be given to Christian Poulsen.

=== To security at the Parken Stadium ===
The Parken Stadium was included in UEFA's list of 4-star stadiums in 1993, making it eligible for hosting UEFA Cup finals.

After the fan attack, the level of security at the stadium was questioned, and considered further by the UEFA disciplinary committee. An editorial in the Danish daily Jyllands-Posten criticized the safety arrangements at Parken, saying it could have serious consequences for Denmark, but praised referee Fandel's decision to abandon the match.

=== To the perpetrator ===
The attacker stated in court that he was intoxicated by the consumption of alcohol, to a degree that he could not recall attacking the referee. The criminal court dealt out a suspended sentence of 30 days in prison. The prosecution appealed to the High Court of Eastern Denmark, which changed the sentence to 20 days, which had to be served.

The DBU first decided to sue the man for commercial damage should Danish disqualification be confirmed.

Parken Sport & Entertainment first announced its decision to sue the man for DKK 7,000,000 (€940,000) for loss of ticket sales, and the Danish FA will sue the 29-year-old for DKK 1,900,000 (€255,000). That decision was later reverted on the advice of counsel. However, following the outcome of the criminal trial against the culprit, both Parken and Danish FA did go through with a lawsuit against him with those amounts.

Ultimately, only the DBU sued for just over DKK 1.6 million (€215,000). The verdict was given on 18 November 2009 in favour of the DBU, but only gave them DKK 900,000 (€120,000) because of the inadequate security at Parken. The FA said it was "very satisfied" with the verdict, while it reportedly "shocked" the perpetrator. Following the conviction, the perpetrator and the DBU reached an agreement in which the fine was lowered to DKK 250,000 (€35,000).

== Match ==
2 June 2007
20:00 CEST

Denmark	0–3 Awarded	Sweden
Agger 34'; Tomasson 62'; Andreasen 75'	Report	Elmander 7', 26'; Hansson 23'

Parken Stadium, Copenhagen
Attendance: 42,083
Referee: Herbert Fandel (Germany)

Denmark	Sweden

GK	1	Thomas Sørensen
RB	6	Lars Jacobsen
CB	4	Daniel Agger
CB	3	Michael Gravgaard
LB	2	Christian Poulsen	(red card) 89'
CM	5	Jan Kristiansen		(substituted off) 35'
CM	7	Daniel Jensen		(substituted off) 63'
RW	11	Dennis Rommedahl
AM	8	Thomas Kahlenberg		(substituted off) 46'
LW	10	Martin Jørgensen
CF	9	Jon Dahl Tomasson (c)
Substitutions:
MF	12	Leon Andreasen	(yellow card) 77'	(substituted on) 35'
FW	19	Nicklas Bendtner		(substituted on) 46'
FW	15	Jesper Grønkjær		(substituted on) 63'
Manager:
Morten Olsen

GK	1	Andreas Isaksson
RB	5	Niclas Alexandersson	(yellow card) 44'
CB	3	Olof Mellberg
CB	4	Petter Hansson
LB	2	Mikael Nilsson
RM	7	Christian Wilhelmsson
CM	6	Tobias Linderoth	(yellow card) 84'
CM	8	Anders Svensson
LM	9	Freddie Ljungberg (c)
SS	11	Johan Elmander	(yellow card) 38'	(substituted off) 74'
CF	10	Marcus Allbäck		(substituted off) 80'
Substitutions:
FW	18	Markus Rosenberg		(substituted on) 74'
MF	16	Kennedy Bakircioglu		(substituted on) 80'
Manager:
Lars Lagerbäck

Assistant referees:
Carsten Kadach (Germany)
Volker Wezel (Germany)
Fourth official:
Florian Meyer (Germany)

Match rules

- 90 minutes.
- Maximum of three substitutions.

== See also ==
- UEFA Euro 2008 qualifying Group F
- Denmark–Sweden football rivalry
- Roligan
