= Petter Hansson =

Swedish footballer

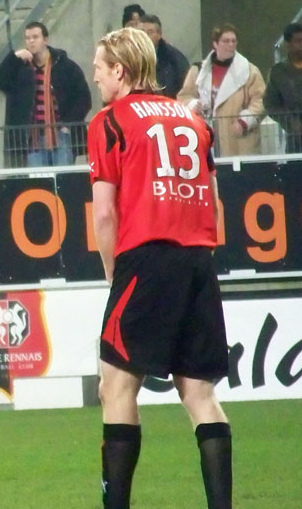
- Hansson in 2008

Personal information
- Full name: Carl Johan Petter Hansson
- Date of birth: 14 December 1976 (age 49)
- Place of birth: Söderhamn, Sweden
- Height: 1.87 m (6 ft 2 in)
- Position: Defender

Youth career
- -1994: Stugsunds IK

Senior career*
Years	Team	Apps	(Gls)
1994–1997	Söderhamns FF	55	(5)
1998–2002	Halmstads BK	86	(13)
2002–2007	SC Heerenveen	163	(14)
2007–2010	Rennes	102	(4)
2010–2012	Monaco	47	(0)
2012	Sunnersta AIF	4	(0)
Total		457	(36)

International career
2001–2009	Sweden	43	(2)
- * Club domestic league appearances and goals

Carl Johan Petter Hansson (IPA: [ˈpɛ̌tːɛr ˈhɑ̌ːnsɔn]; born 14 December 1976) is a Swedish former professional footballer who played as a defender. He most notably represented Halmstads BK, SC Heerenveen, Rennes, and Monaco during a career that spanned between 1994 and 2012. A full international between 2001 and 2009, he won 43 caps for the Sweden national team and represented his country at the 2004 and 2008 UEFA European Championships as well as the 2006 FIFA World Cup.

== Club career ==
=== Early career ===
Hansson started his career at Söderhamns FF and was transferred to Halmstads BK in 1998. He made his Allsvenskan debut on 4 October 1998 against AIK. Petter Hansson became a popular player at Halmstads BK, mainly because his fighting spirit and a strong will to win a match. Hansson played as a defensive midfielder and as a central defender and became a key player for the club. This resulted in a growing popularity among fans and he became the team's captain. While at Halmstads BK he helped them win the fourth championship in their history in 2000.

=== SC Heerenveen ===
In 2002, he moved to the Netherlands to play at Eredivisie side SC Heerenveen. At Heerenveen he developed as a more consistent player and became a fan's favourite again. Heerenveen supporters voted him to be SC Heerenveen's best player of the season several times.

=== Rennes ===
On 1 May 2007, he signed a contract at Stade Rennais, playing in Ligue 1. On 15 May 2010, Hansson announced that he would be leaving the club when his contract expired at the end of the season.

=== Monaco ===
On 4 June 2010, he signed a contract with the Ligue 1 club AS Monaco FC. On 30 May 2012, Hansson officially announced, through his agent Fabrice Picot, his retirement as a player.

== International career ==
Hansson earned his first cap for the Sweden national team in 2001, in a match against Finland. He was part of their squad during Euro 2004 and the 2006 World Cup. On 2 June 2007, in the rivalry match against Denmark, he scored his first goal for the national team. During qualification for Euro 2008, he was partnered with Olof Mellberg. On 10 June 2008, at the Euro 2008, he scored his second goal for the national team in the opening match of their campaign, a 2–0 defeat of Greece.

After losing away against Denmark on 10 October 2009, it was obvious that Sweden had failed to qualify 2010 FIFA World Cup in South Africa the following year. Due to this, Hansson along with several other players decided to end their international careers after the final qualifying match against Albania, which Sweden won 4–1. In October 2010, Hansson made a brief comeback to the national team due to Mellberg's suspension in Sweden's UEFA Euro 2012 qualifier away against the Netherlands on 12 October. Hansson was an unused substitute. Sweden was defeated 4–1.

== Career statistics ==
=== International ===
Appearances and goals by national team and year
National team	Year	Apps	Goals
Sweden	2001	1	0
Sweden	2002	0	0
Sweden	2003	0	0
Sweden	2004	7	0
Sweden	2005	3	0
Sweden	2006	9	0
Sweden	2007	10	1
Sweden	2008	10	1
Sweden	2009	3	0
Total		43	2

Scores and results list Sweden's goal tally first, score column indicates score after each Hansson goal.

List of international goals scored by Petter Hansson
No.	Date	Venue	Opponent	Score	Result	Competition	Ref.
1	2 June 2007	Parken Stadium, Copenhagen, Denmark	Denmark	2–0	3–0 (Note: Match abandoned, see UEFA Euro 2008 qualifier fan attack.)	UEFA Euro 2008 qualifying	
2	10 June 2008	Wals Siezenheim Stadium, Salzburg, Greece	Greece	2–0	2–0	UEFA Euro 2008	

== Honours ==
Halmstads BK

- Allsvenskan: 2000

Individual

- Stor Grabb: 2007
