= Mikael Nilsson (footballer, born 1978) =

Swedish footballer (born 1978)

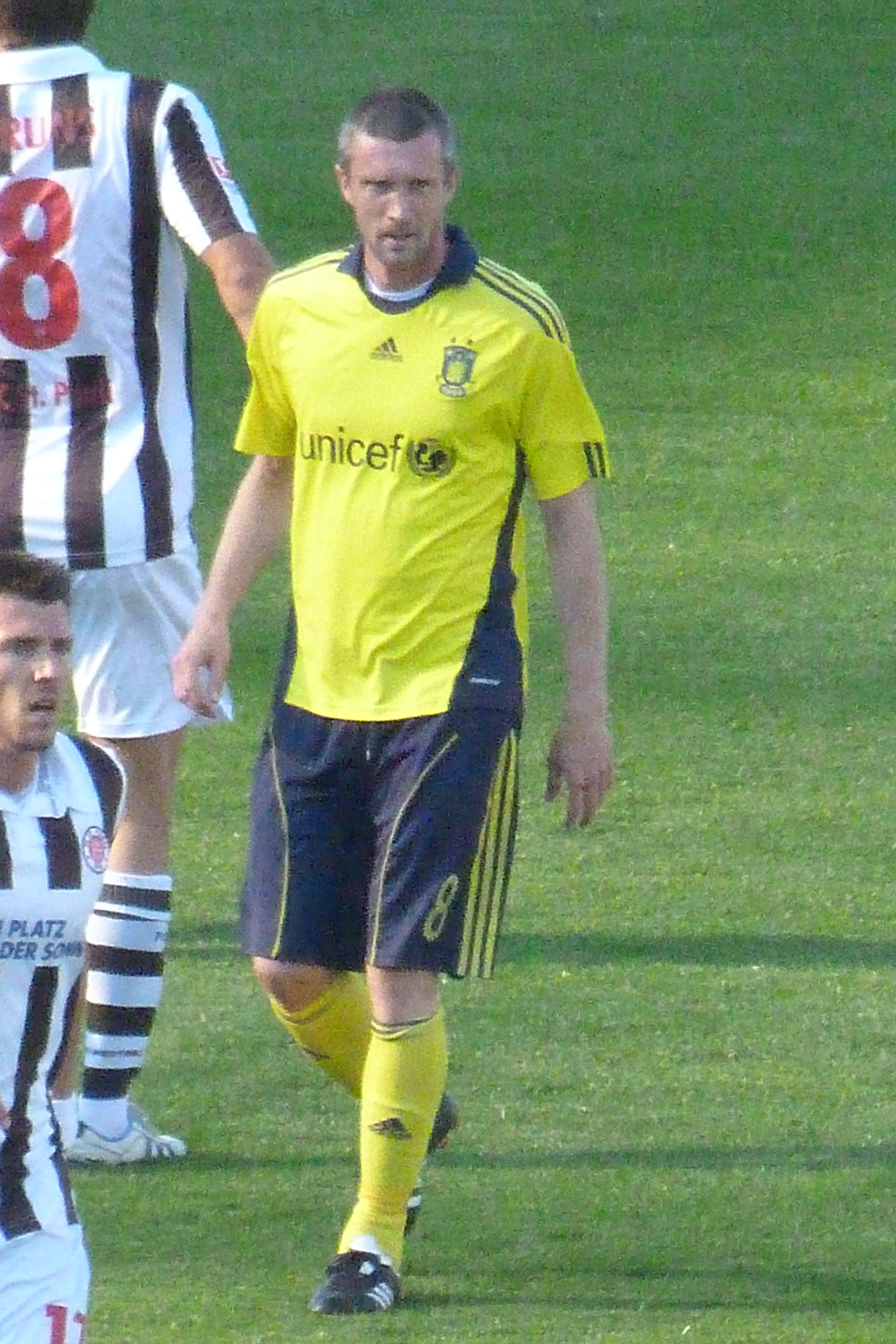
- Nilsson with Bröndby IF in 2011

Personal information
- Full name: Per Benny Mikael Nilsson
- Date of birth: 24 June 1978 (age 48)
- Place of birth: Ovesholm, Sweden
- Height: 1.83 m (6 ft 0 in)
- Positions: Midfielder; defender

Senior career*
Years	Team	Apps	(Gls)
1995–1998	Ovesholms IF	18	(3)
1999	Åhus Horna BK	22	(11)
2000–2004	Halmstads BK	103	(17)
2004–2005	Southampton	16	(0)
2005–2009	Panathinaikos	82	(0)
2009–2012	Brøndby IF	77	(3)
2012	Fremad Amager	1	(0)
Total		319	(34)

International career
2002–2009	Sweden	64	(3)
- * Club domestic league appearances and goals

Per Benny Mikael Nilsson (Swedish pronunciation: [ˈmîːkaɛl ˈnɪ̌lːsɔn]; born 24 June 1978) is a Swedish former professional footballer who played as a midfielder and defender. He is best remembered for representing Halmstads BK, Panathinaikos, and Brøndby. A full international between 2002 and 2009, he played 64 matches for Sweden and was a part of their UEFA Euro 2004, 2006 FIFA World Cup, and UEFA Euro 2008 squads.

== Club career ==
Nilsson started his career with Ovesholms IF, where he stayed until 1998 when he moved to Åhus Horna BK. He played for the club for only one season before moving to Halmstads BK in 2000. His first season was mostly spent on the bench, but eventually he became one of the team's more important players until, during the 2004 season, he was sold to English club Southampton.

At Southampton, he was not able to establish himself as a regular member of the first team and in 2005 he was sold to Greek club Panathinaikos.

On 4 March 2008, he stated that when returning to Sweden he would play for Halmstads BK, but he would live in Malmö since he wanted to live in a larger city.

On 8 April 2009, Nilsson announced a transfer to Brøndby IF. He signed a three-year contract and will move to the club on 1 July 2009.

Nilsson's Brøndby contract expired on 30 June 2012 after which Nilsson left the club following three years playing as both a right back, midfielder and occasionally right midfielder. In his last six months at Brøndby, Nilsson did not play much as Brøndby did not see Nilsson as part of the club's future.

In August 2012 he agreed to play for the Copenhagen-based club Fremad Amager due to the new assigned coach Per F. Hansen, as he was the former assistant coach of Brøndby IF. Although on 8 August 2012, Nilsson officially announced his retirement as a player.

== International career ==
He has played in the Sweden national team since 20 November 2002, when he made his debut against the Czech Republic in which he scored two goals in a 3–3 draw. He has been a part of Sweden's squad to the UEFA Euro 2004, 2006 FIFA World Cup and UEFA Euro 2008, mainly playing as a defender.

He started out as a midfielder, but once when the national team lacked defenders, Nilsson was moved back, since then he generally played as a defender for the national team.

During the 2010 FIFA World Cup qualification Sweden changed to 3–5–2 formation, placing Nilsson again on the midfield. On 6 June 2009, Sweden played a 2010 FIFA World Cup qualifying match against Denmark at the Råsunda Stadium in Solna. Nilsson made a terrible mistake that caused Sweden to lose 0–1 and eventually miss the World Cup. A cross came in from the right and Nilsson was going to clear it out of Swedish penalty area. He was not under pressure when the ball came. Somehow, he managed to get the ball on his left leg, causing it to roll across the goal-line and to the Danish midfielder Thomas Kahlenberg who scored easily.

Following Sweden's failure to reach the 2010 FIFA World Cup, Nilsson announced his retirement from international football, stating he would not be able to balance playing for both Brøndby IF and the Sweden national team.

== Career statistics ==
=== International ===
Appearances and goals by national team and year

National team	Year	Apps	Goals
Sweden
Sweden	2002	1	2
Sweden	2003	10	1
Sweden	2004	13	0
Sweden	2005	1	0
Sweden	2006	8	0
Sweden	2007	10	0
Sweden	2008	12	0
Sweden	2009	9	0
Total		64	3

International goals

#	Date	Venue	Opponent	Score	Result	Competition
1.	20 November 2002	Na Stínadlech, Teplice, Czech Republic	Czech Republic	1–1	3–3	Friendly
2.	20 November 2002	Na Stínadlech, Teplice, Czech Republic	Czech Republic	2–1	3–3	Friendly
3.	10 September 2003	Silesian Stadium, Chorzów, Poland	Poland	1–0	2–0	UEFA Euro 2004 qualifying

== Honours ==
Halmstads BK

- Allsvenskan: 2000

Sweden

- King's Cup: 2003
