= Parken Sport & Entertainment =

Danish entertainment company

PARKEN Sport & Entertainment A/S
- Company type: Public
- Traded as: Nasdaq Copenhagen: PARKEN
- Industry: Entertainment, Sports
- Founded: 1992
- Headquarters: Copenhagen, Denmark
- Website: http://www.parken.dk/

Parken Sport & Entertainment A/S (short: PS&E) is a Danish company located at Parken Stadium in the Østerbro area of Copenhagen. The company was founded on 1. April 1991 to run the football club F.C. Copenhagen (in Danish: F.C. København or just FCK). Today PS&E operates F.C. Copenhagen, Lalandia (water parks), Parken Stadium stadium and office space for leasing at the stadium.

== Board and directors ==
PS&E board Members and Directors (pr. 17 September 2020):

Board of directors: Bo Rygaard (Chairman of the Board); Erik Skjærbæk; Karl Peter Korsgaard Sørensen; William Kvist; Henrik Møgelmose; Benny Olsen; Gert Petersen; Hans Jacob Carstensen	Group director: Jan Harrit

== Ownership and group structure ==
Parken Sport & Entertainment's major shareholders are:

- Seier Capital Denmark A/S: 22,55% (owned by Lars Seier)
- KPS Invest A/S: 20,54% (owned by Karl Peter Korsgaard Sørensen)
- Es-Parken ApS: 29,8% (owned by Erik Skjærbæk)

=== The group ===
The companies used to operate the different businesses in the group are:

- Driftsselskabet af 1. marts 2006 A/S (100 % ownership)
- Accommodation Services A/S (100% ownership)
- Lalandia A/S (100% ownership)
- Lalandia Billund A/S (100 % ownership)
