= Denmark national football team =

Men's association football team

Denmark
- Nickname(s): De Rød-Hvide (The Red and Whites); Danish Dynamite
- Association: Dansk Boldspil-Union (DBU)
- Confederation: UEFA (Europe)
- Head coach: Brian Riemer
- Captain: Pierre Emile Højbjerg
- Most caps: Christian Eriksen (151)
- Top scorer: Poul Nielsen; Jon Dahl Tomasson (52)
- Home stadium: Parken Stadium
- FIFA code: DEN
First colours	Second colours

FIFA ranking
- Current: 21 (18 November 2026)
- Highest: 3 (May 1997–August 1997)
- Lowest: 51 (6 April 2017)

First international
- Denmark 9–0 France B (London, England; 19 October 1908)

Biggest win
- Denmark 17–1 France (London, England; 22 October 1908)

Biggest defeat
- Germany 8–0 Denmark (Breslau, Germany; 16 May 1937)

World Cup
- Appearances: 6 (first in 1986)
- Best result: Quarter-finals (1998)

European Championship
- Appearances: 10 (first in 1964)
- Best result: Champions (1992)

CONMEBOL–UEFA Cup of Champions
- Appearances: 1 (first in 1993)
- Best result: Runners-up (1993)

Confederations Cup
- Appearances: 1 (first in 1995)
- Best result: Champions (1995)
Medal record
Men's football
UEFA European Championship
Gold medal – first place	1992 Sweden	Team
FIFA Confederations Cup
Gold medal – first place	1995 Saudi Arabia	Team
Olympic Games
Silver medal – second place	1908 London	Team
Silver medal – second place	1912 Stockholm	Team
Silver medal – second place	1960 Rome	Team
Bronze medal – third place	1948 London	Team
CONMEBOL–UEFA Cup of Champions
Silver medal – second place	1993 Mar del Plata	Team

The Denmark national football team (Danish: Danmarks herre-fodboldlandshold or herrelandsholdet) represents Denmark including Greenland, but not the Faroe Islands, in men's international football competitions. It is controlled by the Danish Football Association (DBU), the governing body for the football clubs which are organised under DBU. Denmark's home stadium is Parken Stadium in the Østerbro district of Copenhagen.

Denmark were winners of the unofficial 1906 Intercalated Games football competition and silver medalists at the 1908 and 1912 Olympics. However, as amateurs who prohibited their internationals from becoming professionals at foreign clubs, Denmark did not qualify for the FIFA World Cup until 1986. Since the 1980s and the "Danish Dynamite" team, Denmark remained competitive in international tournaments, winning the 1992 European Championship in Sweden, which marked the team's most prominent victory and the 1995 King Fahd Cup (the predecessor of FIFA Confederations Cup). Denmark has long-standing football rivalries with Nordic neighbours Norway and Sweden.

== History ==
=== Amateur years ===
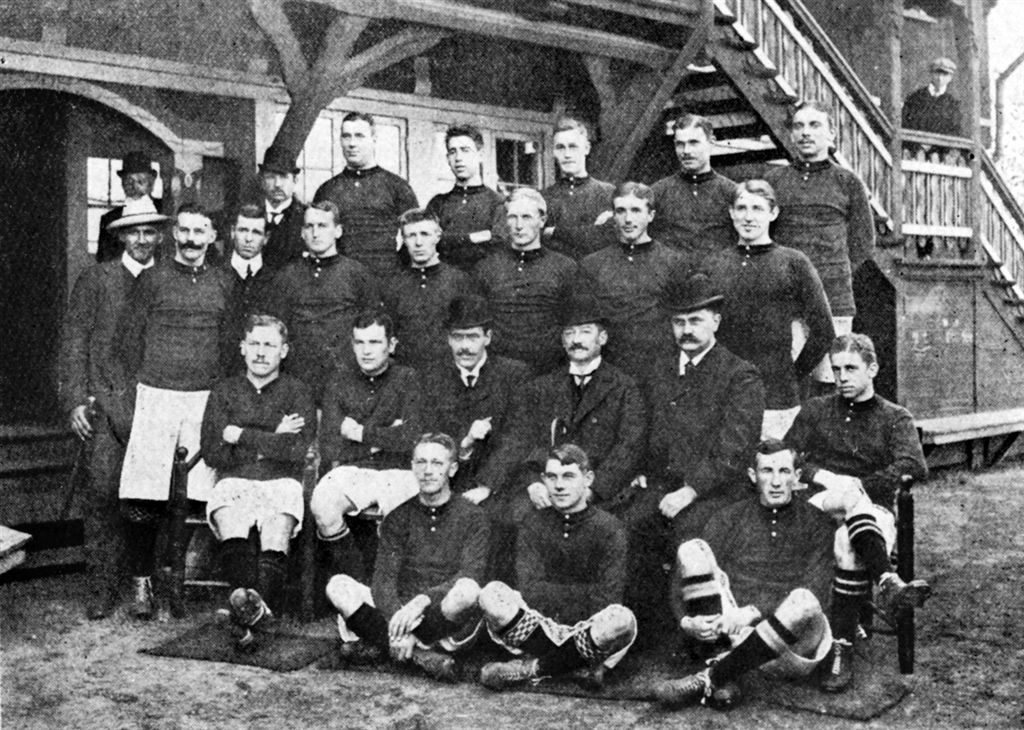
The Danish team that won their first silver medal at the 1908 Summer Olympics. Harald Bohr is in the top row, 2nd from left.

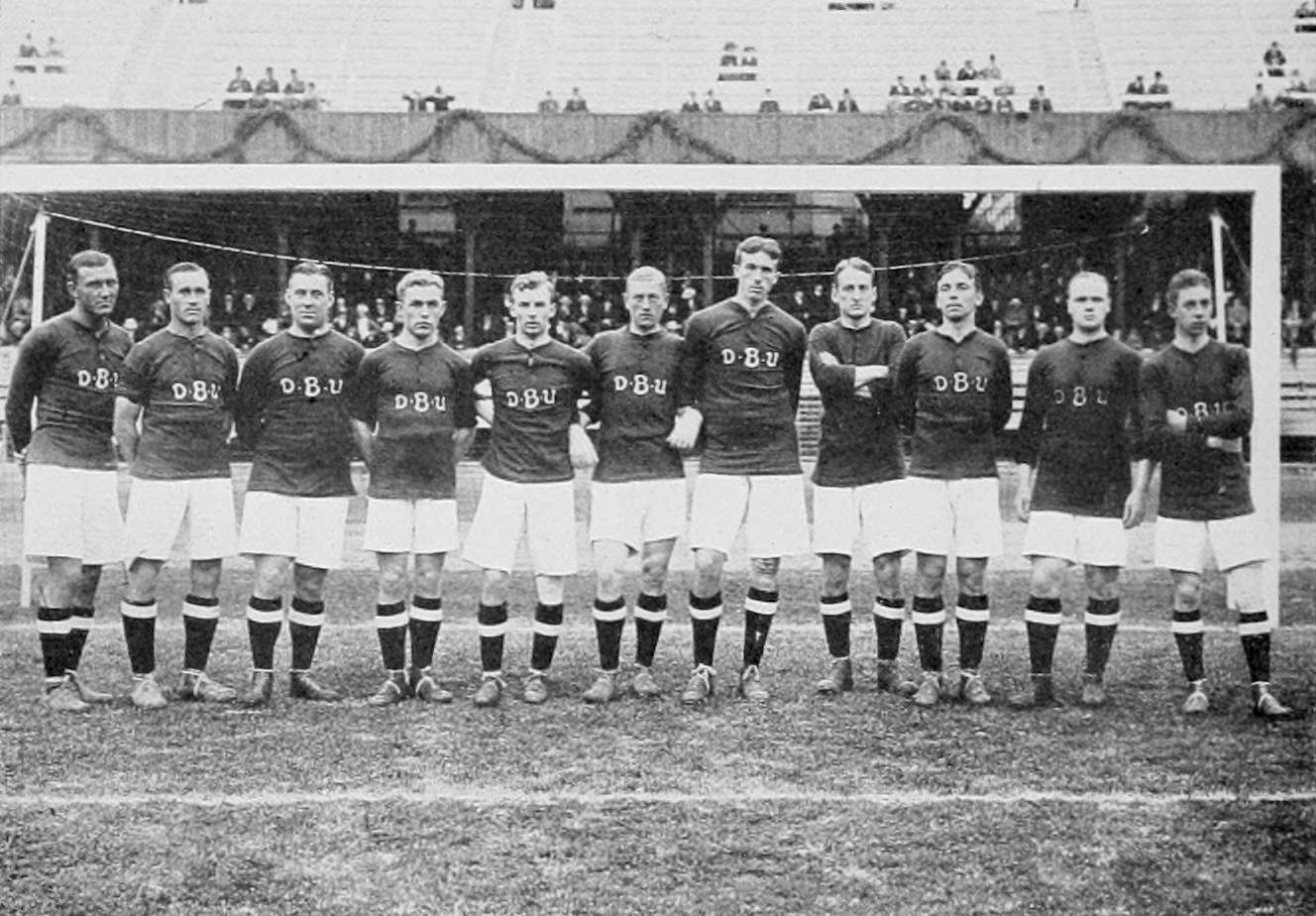
Danish team, winning the silver medals at the 1912 Olympics

On 12 April 1896, Denmark XI defeated Podilatikos Syllogos Athinon, either 9–0 or 15–0, at the Neo Phaliron Velodrome in Athens in a demonstration game during the 1896 Olympic Games.

On 18 April 1897, a game was played in Hamburg when a selection team from the Danish Football Association defeated a selection team from the Hamburg-Altona Football Association, 5–0 in the presence of 5,000 spectators.

The first three editions of the Olympic football event in 1900–1906 had an unofficial status, as the event was not yet open for national football teams to compete, and only had limited participation of three or four club teams from a few nations. Denmark had no club team invited in the 1900 Olympics and the 1904 Olympics, but then received a special invitation for the unofficial 1906 Olympics, to compete against one Greek club team (Athens) and two club teams from the Ottoman Empire (Smyrna and Thessaloniki). The team to represent Denmark was compiled of players from the Copenhagen Football Association (KBU), and they won the event, and thereby an unofficial gold medal. Two years later, in the first official football tournament at the 1908 Olympics, Denmark won a silver medal. At the next Olympics, in 1912, the team again won a silver medal, which was followed by a golden era from July 1912 until August 1920, with Denmark ranked most of the time as number one in the world by the Elo ranking. The first official national football match was played on 19 October 1908 during the Olympic Games in London. Denmark beat France's second team 9–0 in the tournament's quarter-finals.

Although Denmark figured fairly prominently in the pre-FIFA World Cup era, international success would elude them for years from the first World Cup in 1930 and forward. Despite the country's ability to produce outstanding football talents, the Danish Football Union (DBU) only had the ambition (or economy) to send the national team to play friendly matches and in the regional tournament, the Nordic Championship, from October 1920 until June 1948. When DBU opted to set their sights higher, they allowed the national team to start contesting the Olympics again, promptly resulting in a bronze medal at the 1948 Olympics. After, the team only reached the quarter-final at the 1952 Olympics, with the DBU choosing not to contest the next 1956 Olympics. As football remained an amateur past-time, most of the best Danish footballers moved abroad to make a living, and due to DBU enforcing the rule to bar all professionals from the national team, it started to become difficult to assemble a highly competitive team.

Denmark experienced their next revival at the 1960 Olympics with a third set of Olympic silver medals. This was followed by another notable performance at the 1964 European Nations' Cup, where Denmark impressively finished in fourth place. However, this finish was considered by many as being more the result of a comparatively easy draw rather than a result of a well-playing team. In order for Denmark to qualify for the semi-final, they only had to defeat Malta, Albania and Luxembourg. In the semi-final, Denmark fell 3–0 to the Soviet Union, then lost the third-place match to Hungary.

The strict rule of only allowing amateurism at the national team was finally abolished by the DBU in May 1971, as they had acknowledged this change was needed in order to build a highly competitive team. In February 1978, when the DBU also decided to allow professional football to be introduced in the Danish leagues, the way was at the same time paved for the national team to sign its first sponsorship with the well-known Danish brewery Carlsberg. The new sponsorship enabled the DBU to hire the German Sepp Piontek in July 1979 as the first full-time professional coach of the national team. The full transition of the national team from amateurism to professionalism had now been accomplished, and indeed, this would soon lead to a vast improvement in the performances of the team.

According to Rob Smyth and Lars Eriksen, authors of a book on the "Danish Dynamite" team that would soon emerge:

That process [the transition to professionalism] was accelerated by the fact that so many of the national team were playing abroad, and values learned there were slowly seeping in. ... Denmark got a headstart on football globalisation, benefiting from the enlightenment and experience that comes with playing abroad. At Euro 84, their 20-man squad contained 14 overseas-based players; the other seven teams had only five between them. At Mexico 86, their squad included players from the champions of Italy, West Germany, England, Holland and Belgium, but not Denmark.

=== Danish Dynamite (1980–1990) ===
In the 1982 FIFA World Cup qualification, Denmark finished with four wins and four losses, including a 3–1 win against the eventual World Cup champions Italy, but Denmark failed to qualify for the final tournament. Qualification for UEFA Euro 1984 saw Denmark defeat England at Wembley Stadium when Allan Simonsen converted a penalty kick for a 1–0 win. Denmark qualified for their first international tournament since 1964, and the team was dubbed "Danish Dynamite" in a competition for the official Danish Euro 1984 song. Denmark's participation ended in the semi-final when the team lost on penalties to Spain, most remembered for Preben Elkjær's penalty miss, his shorts torn apart. Following the strong performance at the finals, the name "Danish Dynamite" became a mainstay for the following decade of the Denmark national team under head coach Sepp Piontek.

Denmark celebrating v Uruguay at the 1986 World Cup

Denmark made their first World Cup appearance in the 1986 World Cup, and with the attacking duo of Michael Laudrup and Preben Elkjær, thrashed Uruguay 6–1. In the second round, Denmark once again faced Spain and once more lost, 5–1, including four goals by Emilio Butragueño. The first Spanish goal was caused by a miss-timed backpass by Jesper Olsen to Butragueño, an unfortunate action subsequently coined as "a real Jesper Olsen" ("en rigtig Jesper Olsen"). The phrase would live on for 13 years, and was repeated by the Danish TV commentators in 1999, when an identical backpass was carried out by Jesper Grønkjær to Filippo Inzaghi in Grønkjær's debut for the national team.

Denmark qualified for Euro 1988, and nearly made the 1988 Olympics. Richard Møller Nielsen guided Denmark to a secured spot for the final tournament – ahead of West Germany, but following the discovery that Dane Per Frimann was not eligible for the team's 2–0 win over Poland, Denmark was penalised, and subsequently failed to qualify. At Euro 1988, Denmark's participation ended in early defeat after Denmark lost all the group games to Spain 3–2, West Germany 2–0 and Italy 2–0. They then failed to qualify for the 1990 World Cup; Sepp Piontek resigned as head coach of the national team in April 1990, where he was replaced by Richard Møller Nielsen.

=== The Møller Nielsen fairytale: 1992 European Championship ===
Denmark began Euro 1992 qualification with a home victory against the Faroe Islands, and followed up with an away draw against Northern Ireland and a 2–0 home loss against Yugoslavia. Brothers Michael Laudrup and Brian Laudrup opted to quit the national team in November 1990. When Nielsen subsequently decided to dismiss quality players such as Jan Mølby and Jan Heintze from the squad due to disciplinary problems, several newspapers began demanding that Nielsen step down as head coach. Despite this, Denmark won the rest of their five matches in the qualification group, including a 2–1 away win against Yugoslavia. This was not enough to qualify, as the team still had to settle for second place in the group, behind Yugoslavia.

Due to international sanctions resulting from the Yugoslav wars, UEFA announced on 31 May 1992 – only 10 days before the competition – that Yugoslavia was excluded from the competition and their place given to Denmark, who finished as the second-placed team in its qualifying group.

Contrary to popular belief, the team did not enter the tournament completely unprepared, after having rallied home from seaside vacations. The majority of players had been assembled to play a friendly match against the CIS when Denmark officially received Yugoslavia's spot. Relying heavily on goalkeeper Peter Schmeichel and his defense, as well as creative spark Brian Laudrup – having decided to make a comeback for the national team in April 1992 – the Danish team created one of the biggest surprises in the event's history, as they went on to win the European Championship trophy under head coach Nielsen's defensive playing style. Advancing from the group stage ahead of England and France, Denmark defeated the Netherlands – the defending Euro 1988 champions – on penalties in the semi-final. Later, in the final, Denmark won 2–0 win against reigning World Cup champions Germany, ensuring Denmark its first international trophy.

=== Decline and revival (1993–2000) ===
In August 1993, Michael Laudrup decided to settle his ongoing dispute with Richard Møller Nielsen about the team tactics and made a comeback to the national team. However, the following years Denmark saw mixed results, as they first failed to qualify for the 1994 World Cup, but then won the 1995 Confederations Cup (then known as King Fahd Cup), beating Copa América champions Argentina 2–0 in the final. As defending champions at Euro 1996, Denmark disappointed with a lackluster performance after an early elimination in the group stage. The team had achieved a respectable win against Turkey, a draw against Portugal and only a defeat to Croatia.

Nielsen's replacement was Swede Bo "Bosse" Johansson, who gave the team a more offensive strategy, and the 1998 World Cup saw the revival of the Danish team, starring both Laudrup brothers in their last international campaign. After defeating Saudi Arabia 1–0, drawing with South Africa and losing 2–1 to eventual champions France, Denmark defeated Nigeria 4–1 in the round of 16. They exited in the quarterfinals with a 3–2 loss to Brazil.

Without the Laudrup brothers, Denmark qualified for Euro 2000, only to lose all three matches in the group stage.

=== The Olsen Gang (2000–2015) ===
FIFA World Rankings for Denmark, August 1993 – July 2009

Morten Olsen was named the new manager for Denmark in 2000 and the team was quickly dubbed the "Olsen Gang", a reference to the series of Danish movies based around the main character Egon Olsen and his genius (criminal) plans. The nickname was also used for the Danish team as an alternative to the more commonly used "Danish Dynamite", already in those days when Olsen played as a captain. Denmark's tactics shifted from the preferred 4–4–2 formation practised by Bo Johansson to an even more attacking style with an emphasis on the wingers available at the time, namely Jesper Grønkjær and Dennis Rommedahl. Accordingly, Olsen's preferred formation was either a 4–3–3 or a 4–2–3–1. Olsen even possessed an outspoken opposition to the 4–4–2 system, as he threatened to leave his position as head coach in the event he was asked to deploy Denmark in that formation. To support the development of players for the new tactical 4–3–3 system, all national youth teams also changed their formation. Another change Olsen brought to the national team was to stress the importance of only using fit players who had been granted regular playing time at their club. However, at times he was forced to compromise from this principle, as the pool of players available in the relatively small nation did not always provide him viable substitute options.

Denmark qualified both for the 2002 World Cup and Euro 2004, but despite impressive results in the group stage in both tournaments, especially the 2–0 win against reigning World Cup winners France in 2002, Denmark failed to advance any further. At the 2002 World Cup, Denmark was defeated by England in the round of 16, and at Euro 2004, they were eliminated in the quarter-finals against the Czech Republic.

For the 2006 World Cup qualification, Denmark was paired with 2002 semi-finalists Turkey and eventual Euro 2004 champions Greece. Following a poor start to qualification, Denmark was trailing both Turkey and Ukraine. After failing to qualify for the 2006 World Cup, Morten Olsen considered leaving the job, having received several offers from club teams, but decided to stay and extended his contract until after the 2010 World Cup.

Denmark failed to qualify for Euro 2008, but qualified for the 2010 World Cup by winning their qualifying group, earning two wins against Sweden and four points against Portugal. Olsen's contract was extended for two more years, until Euro 2012. At the 2010 World Cup, Denmark was grouped with Japan, Cameroon and the Netherlands. Denmark lost the first match 2–0 to the Netherlands, but then scored a 2–1 victory against Cameroon. The game against Japan, however ended with a 3–1 defeat.

In qualification for Euro 2012, Denmark was once again grouped with Portugal; Denmark secured first place in the group, qualifying directly for the final tournament. Out of eight qualifying matches, Denmark won six, drew one and lost one, resulting Olsen's contract to be extended until after the 2014 World Cup.

At Euro 2012, Denmark were drawn in the proclaimed "group of death", Group B, alongside Germany, the Netherlands and Portugal. After defeating the Netherlands 1–0, they lost 3–2 to Portugal, requiring a win against Germany to advance in the tournament. Despite Michael Krohn-Dehli's equaliser, Denmark lost 2–1 to Germany, and with Portugal defeating the Netherlands 2–1, Denmark was eliminated from the tournament after finishing third in Group B.

Denmark failed to qualify for the next two tournaments under Olsen. They finished second in their 2014 World Cup qualifying group but failed to achieve a play-off berth as they were the worst UEFA group runners-up after removing results against the last-place teams. In Euro 2016 qualifying they finished third in their group, behind Albania and eventual winners Portugal, but lost to Sweden in the play-offs.

When measuring the performance of the national team by winning share and earned points, Olsen's reign of the Denmark national team from July 2000 until January 2012 had at the time been the second-most successful in the era of full-time professional coaches, which began in July 1979. As of January 2012, Olsen had a winning share of 52.8%, and with three points for a victory and one for a draw, an average of 1.84 points per match. In comparison, Richard Møller Nielsen still had the best record among the professional coaches of the national team, with a 54.8% winning share and an average of 1.89 points per game.

=== Hareide era: 2016–2020 ===
New coach Åge Hareide presided over the Danish campaign during the qualification stages. Denmark, ranked number 24 in the FIFA World Rankings at the time of the draw, were drawn into Group E, alongside Poland, Montenegro, Romania, Armenia, and Kazakhstan. Despite suffering early defeats to Poland and Montenegro, the Danes rallied, and secured second place in the group, and a berth in the play-offs, with a 1–0 away to Montenegro. Denmark were rewarded for their second-place finish with a play-off against the Republic of Ireland. Denmark secured qualification with a 5–1 win at the Aviva Stadium in Dublin, which included a hat-trick by Christian Eriksen, who added to his tally of eight goals in qualification.

Denmark were allocated into Pot 3 in advance of the draw for the 2018 FIFA World Cup. They were drawn into Group C, alongside Australia, Peru, and France. Their campaign in Russia began in the Mordovia Arena, Saransk, against Peru. A Yussuf Poulsen goal in the second half secured three points for the Danes. However, they struggled against Australia in their second tie, as Christian Eriksen's early goal was cancelled out by a VAR-awarded penalty, converted by Mile Jedinak, in a game that ended 1–1. Denmark secured qualification in their final group game, playing out the only goalless draw in the entire tournament, in the Luzhniki Stadium against France; a result which saw both teams progress.

Denmark faced Croatia in the round of 16, with the Croats topping Group D with three wins. Mathias Jørgensen scored within the first minute of the game to give Denmark the lead, but Mario Mandzukic equalised only three minutes later, leaving the teams equally perched at one goal apiece. The match remained at 1–1 after ninety minutes, necessitating thirty minutes of extra-time, which still failed to separate the teams, as Luka Modrić saw his late penalty saved by goalkeeper Kasper Schmeichel. As such, the tie was to be decided with a penalty shoot-out, with Schmeichel and his Croatian counterpart, Danijel Subašić, positioning themselves on the line to face five penalties each. Croatia advanced, as Subašić saved three shots from Eriksen, Lasse Schöne and Nicolai Jørgensen respectively. Ivan Rakitić scored the decisive penalty to eliminate the Danes, putting an end to their best World Cup campaign since 2002.

Following the World Cup, Denmark prepared for participation in the inaugural iteration of the UEFA Nations League, having been drawn in League B against Wales and the Republic of Ireland. The tournament offers an alternative route of qualification for the European Championship and World Cup, and increases the number of competitive games for international sides, replacing friendlies.

Owing to a dispute with the players' union regarding the commercial rights of the players, the Danish Football Union named an entirely uncapped squad, consisting of a mixture of futsal players and players from the Danish 2nd Division and the Denmark Series (the third and fourth tier of Danish football respectively), in lieu of the regular side, to face Slovakia in a pre-Nations League friendly, and it was feared that the same squad would be used for the competitive fixture against Wales. The dispute arose due to the image rights of the players, with Hummel having the exclusive right to the manufacture and marketing of Danish kits. The DBU wanted to use individual players, without explicit permissions, in their advertising. Hareide would similarly not be involved, with the side instead falling under the temporary management of John Jensen, with Hasse Kuhn serving as the assistant manager. The Danish FA was under a four-year probationary period with UEFA for having forfeited a Women's World Cup qualification game against Sweden in 2017 due to a similar dispute with the women's team, and a further violation could have resulted in Denmark being prohibited from participation in either the 2018–19 UEFA Nations League or the 2020 European Championship. After a temporary agreement enabled the return of the regular players, the Danes won their first Nations League fixture 2–0.

Hareide managed Denmark during UEFA Euro 2020 qualifying and won four matches, drawing four more. This meant Denmark qualified for the tournament, but due to the COVID-19 pandemic the tournament was postponed to 2021, and Hareide's contract expired on 30 June 2020. He was replaced by Kasper Hjulmand.

=== Hjulmand era: 2020–2024 ===
At UEFA Euro 2020, Denmark were beaten 1–0 by Finland. During the match, Christian Eriksen suffered a heart attack in the 42nd minute which led to the match being suspended for over two hours. The following day, Denmark put in an attractive display of teamwork against Belgium, but ultimately lost 2–1. On the final matchday, Denmark put in a fine performance to defeat Russia 4–1, finishing 2nd in the group with the same number of points as the Finns and the Russians, but a superior head-to-head goal difference. Denmark became the first team to qualify for the knockout phase of a European Championship despite two opening defeats. Facing Wales in the round of 16, Denmark won by a large margin (4–0) to challenge the Czech Republic for a place in the last four of the competition. It won this duel of outsiders 2–1. Its run came to an end in the semi-final against England, a 2–1 defeat in extra time, despite Mikkel Damsgaard opening the scoring with a sublime free-kick on the half-hour mark. Despite the disappointment of being eliminated, the Scandinavian team's performance was widely praised by the sporting press, in particular for its resilience in overcoming the difficult situation caused by Eriksen's heart condition in the first group match, and for its high-quality teamwork and attacking play.

In the 2022–23 UEFA Nations League A, they finished second in their group, only one point behind Croatia and winning twice against world champions France. Denmark also qualified for the 2022 FIFA World Cup, topping Group F in the qualification campaign ahead of Scotland, with nine victories, eight of which without conceding a goal.

In the 2022 World Cup, Denmark were drawn again with France, Tunisia and Australia in group D. Due to their impressive Euro 2020 performance and World Cup qualifying and Nations League displays, expectations for Denmark to make a historic breakthrough were high. Denmark were reinforced with the return of captain Christian Eriksen, who recovered from the Euro 2020 stroke. Denmark finished last in their group with only one point and one goal scored.

The UEFA Euro 2024 qualifiers were also a tough affair for Denmark, seeded first in the draw but struggling in most of their matches, including a humiliating 3–2 defeat in Kazakhstan after leading 2–0. Nevertheless, the Danish team managed to finish top of their group with 7 wins, 1 draw and 2 defeats, and qualified for their 10th continental finals. At UEFA Euro 2024, Denmark qualified as runners-up in their group but were eliminated by Germany in the round of 16. Following the tournament, Hjulmand resigned on 19 July 2024, and his assistant Morten Wieghorst was named as the new manager on a short-term contract until the end of 2024.

=== Riemer era: 2024–present ===
Morten Wieghorst never managed the team in a competitive game, since he had to go on sick leave on 26 August 2024, and he was replaced as caretaker by Lars Knudsen. Knudsen oversaw Denmark's first four matches of the UEFA Nations League. On 24 October 2024, former Anderlecht manager Brian Riemer was named new manager of the Danish national team.

On 23 March 2025, Denmark played against Portugal during the Nations League quarter-finals, which ended in a 5–3 aggregate loss for Denmark after extra time; this was the first time that Denmark had qualified for the knockout stage of the UEFA Nations League.

In the 2026 FIFA World Cup qualification, Denmark finished second in Group C behind Scotland following a 4–2 defeat in Glasgow. Denmark then advanced to the European play-offs, beating North Macedonia 4–0 in the Path D semi-final before losing the final to the Czech Republic on penalties after a 2–2 draw following extra time, thereby failing to qualify for the World Cup. The qualification failure marked Denmark's first absence from a major tournament since Euro 2016.

== Team image ==
=== Supporters ===
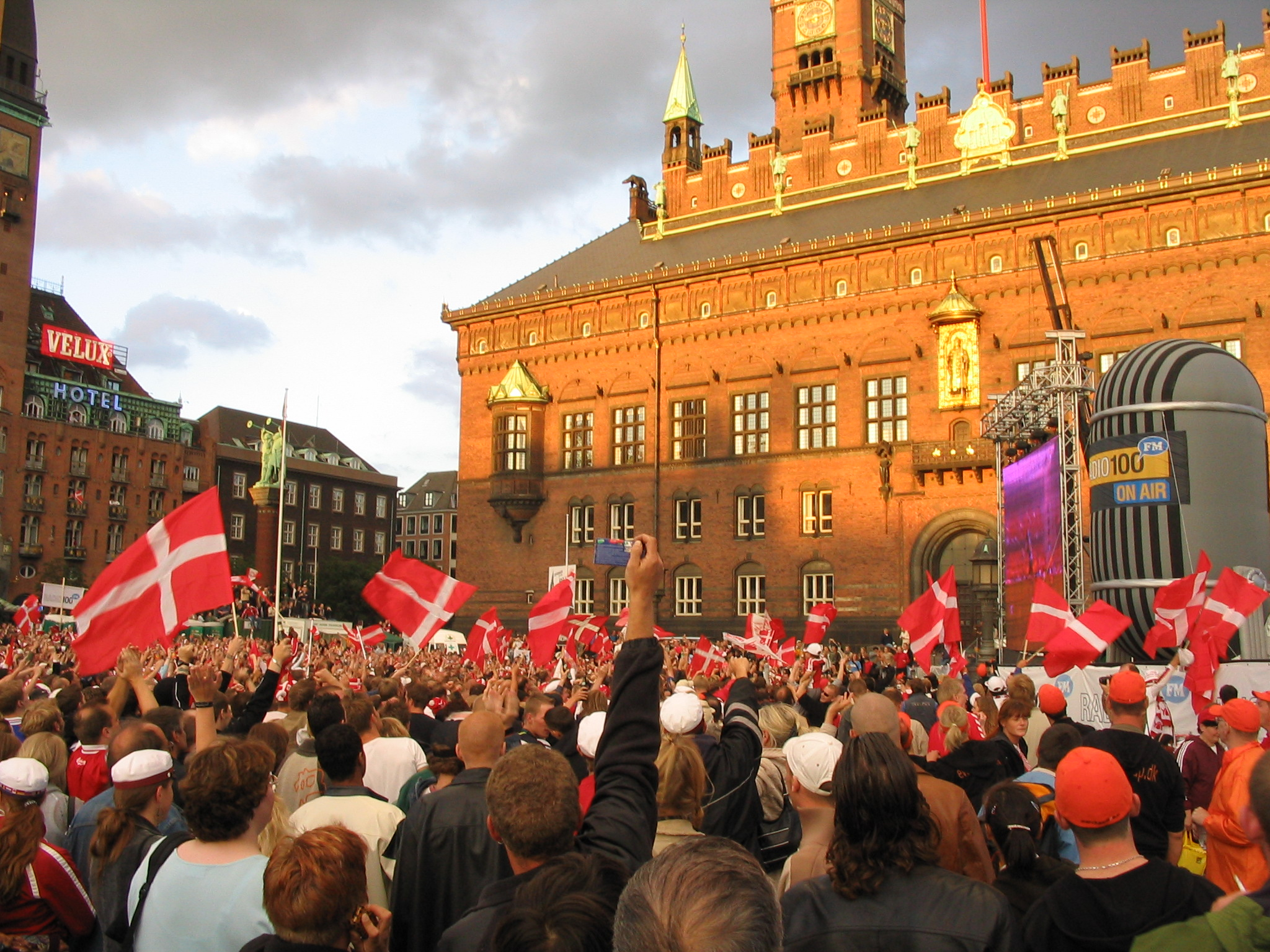
Crowd watching the Denmark–Sweden Euro 2004 match at the Copenhagen City Hall Square

Apart from the national team, Denmark is famous for its traveling fans, known as roligans. The movement emerged during the 1980s as the declared opposition to hooliganism. The goal of the roligan movement is calm, yet cheerful, support during the matches, as "rolig" means "calm" in the Danish language. The roligans have since developed an image of easy-going nature and rabid support, and are often considered amongst the world's best national team fans, along with the Tartan Army of Scotland. They were collectively given the FIFA FairPlay Award at the 1984 European Championships. The term "roligan" was invented by the editors of the Danish newspaper B.T. in 1985, and later included in the Danish dictionary. Just before the 1986 World Cup, the roligan movement was organized in order to support the national team at the tournament.

The reputation of the Danish supporters was sullied by an attack from a fan which occurred in June 2007 in the Euro 2008 qualifying match against Sweden, when an enraged Danish supporter invaded the pitch and tried to attack the referee, following his decision to hand out a red card for Christian Poulsen and a penalty kick to Sweden in the last minute of the match. The attacking fan was stopped by some of the Danish football players on the field before he reached the referee, but due to the episode, the match was immediately cancelled by the referee, with UEFA subsequently deciding to award a 3–0 default defeat to Denmark as punishment.

=== Rivalry ===
Denmark's main rival is Sweden. The countries have played against each other 107 times, of which Denmark have won 40, drawn 20 and lost 47. The first match between the teams was an 8–0 Denmark win in May 1913. Denmark won their first five matches against Sweden before their first defeat in October 1916, 4–0.

The first competitive match between the countries was a 1–0 loss for Denmark in the group stage of UEFA Euro 1992. Both teams advanced from the group stage and Denmark went on to win the tournament. In UEFA Euro 2004 the teams drew 2–2 in the last group match, ensuring that both teams advanced at the expense of Italy. In Denmark's home match against Sweden in the qualification for UEFA Euro 2008, the visitors were awarded a 3–0 win after a Danish fan invaded the pitch and attacked the referee. The reverse fixture ended in a goalless draw and Denmark failed to qualify for the final tournament.

In the qualification for the 2010 FIFA World Cup, Denmark won both matches against Sweden 1–0 and qualified for the World Cup. In the play-off round of the qualification for UEFA Euro 2016, Denmark lost to Sweden 4–3 on aggregate and failed to qualify for the finals. The most recent match between the countries was a 2–1 win for Denmark in June 2024.

=== Kit ===
The team kit is produced by Danish company Hummel. It is all-red with white details to reflect the colours of the Danish national flag. Prior to the period of Adidas sponsorship, the kit provider was also Hummel from 1979 to 2004.

Kit provider	Period
(Denmark) Hummel	1979–2004
(Germany) Adidas	2004–2016
(Denmark) Hummel	2016–present

=== Broadcast ===
All of Denmark's qualification, Nations League and friendly matches are broadcast by TV 2 on television. DR holds the rights on radio transmission.

== Home stadium ==
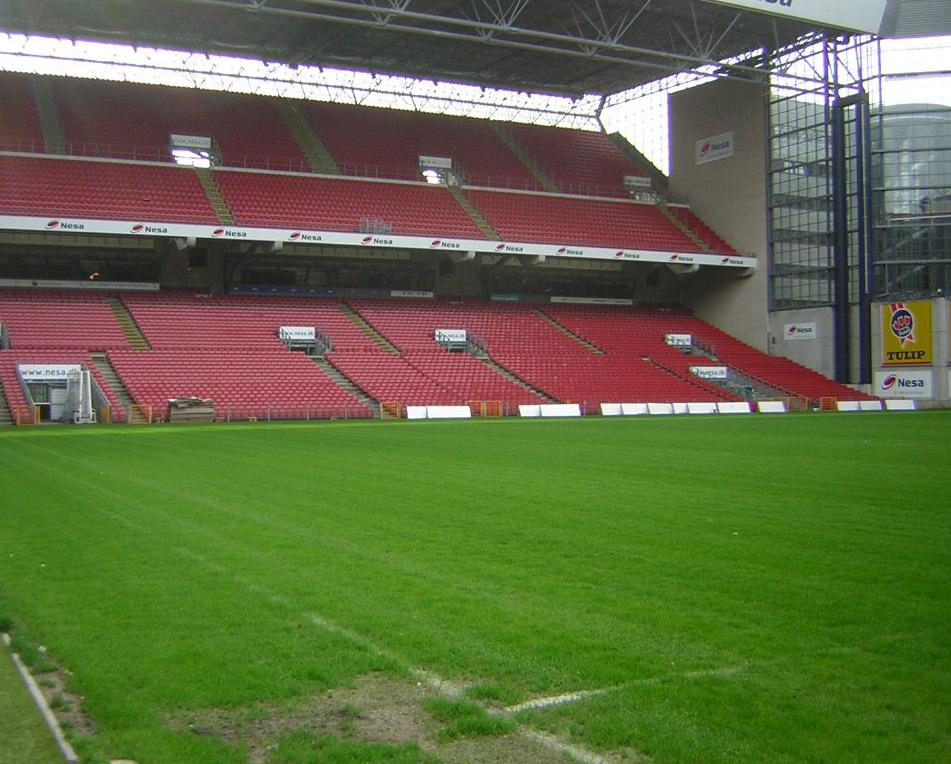
Parken Stadium, with a capacity of 38,065 spectators, located in Copenhagen, and used as official home stadium by the Denmark football team

The first home match for the Denmark national team was a 2–1 friendly win over England on 25 May 1910, taking place with 12,000 spectators at the stadium "KBs baner" (located in the area "Granen", where the Forum Copenhagen later was built). As the facilities were considered too small, a new stadium in Copenhagen was built with the name Idrætsparken. Since its opening on 25 May 1911, it has hosted all the home matches of the football club KB and most of the home matches of the national team. During the first 82 years of the national team, from October 1908 until November 1990, Denmark played a total number of 254 A-level home matches, of which 232 were played in Idrætsparken. Among all the played home matches in Idrætsparken, Denmark achieved 125 victories (54%), 41 draws (18%) and 66 defeats (28%). The stadium reached a record of 51,600 spectators for the 1–2 game against Sweden in June 1957.

In regards of the first era from 1908 to 1990, only 22 home matches were played at other stadiums than Idrætsparken, of which 11 took place at Aarhus Idrætspark (then known as Atletion) in Aarhus, followed by Aalborg Stadion in Aalborg with six games, and the remaining five matches hosted by four other stadiums. Whenever another stadium than Idrætsparken was used for a home match, it was only for some of the less important friendly games or Olympic qualifiers, while only Idrætsparken was used to host the matches related to bigger tournaments, like the Nordic championship, the European Championship and World Cup. When a major rebuild of Idrætsparken began in December 1990, the subsequent two official Euro 1992 qualification matches were moved to Odense Stadium in Odense.

On 9 September 1992, the rebuilt Idrætsparken, now called Parken and later renamed Telia Parken for sponsorship reasons, became the biggest venue in Denmark with a capacity of 42,358 spectators, and was opened with a friendly 1–2 defeat against Germany. This first match in Parken was viewed by 40,500 spectators, while the current stadium record of 42,099 spectators was set on 8 October 2005 for a World Cup qualifying match against Greece.

The capacity of the stadium was later reduced to 38,009 seats after the upper part of the D-side was converted from 4,000 extra seats into office and VIP areas in June 2009. Despite this decrease in capacity, the stadium is today still the biggest venue in Denmark by far; the next largest venue, Brøndby Stadium, only has a capacity of 26,000 seats. From September 1992 to May 2006, Parken was the sole stadium of all the men's senior national team matches. However, meagre spectator support at some of the friendly matches at Parken, which from 2000 to 2005 attracted an acceptable average of 23,862 per match – but down to 9,598 for the friendly 3–1 win over Israel in April 2002 – prompted the DBU to start hosting many of the friendly matches to other stadiums around Denmark. These other stadiums had less spectator capacity than Parken, but just about enough to cover the Danes' somewhat lesser interest for friendly matches.

On 27 May 2006, Parken's 13-year monopoly on national team matches was broken for the first time when Denmark played a friendly match at the Aarhus Idrætspark against upcoming 2006 World Cup participants Paraguay. Tickets to this match were sold out quickly, with almost 19,000 of the 20,227 tickets sold within the first hour of sale, and was support-wise a big success with a total audience of 20,047 spectators. When the two next friendly matches were played at other new venues, such as a match on 16 August at Fionia Park in Odense against Poland, and on 1 September at Brøndby Stadium against Portugal, the number of spectators dropped. The Poland match attracted only 11,088 spectators, while the Portugal match had only 13,186 fans. In particular, the Portugal match was deemed as a support-wise failure because it featured a higher-ranked opponent, which spectators normally would have a high interest to watch. The main reasons why Brøndby Stadium failed to attract a high number of spectators were generally thought to be a combination of the poor rainy weather and the fact the stadium is located on the outskirts of Copenhagen, and as such does not attract a new demographic audience compared to Parken, due to the travel distances being more or less the same for the majority of the population.

Currently, while most of the friendly matches continue to be played at some of the smaller stadiums in Denmark, it has been decided to continue playing all of the qualifying matches for the European Championships and World Cup only at Parken Stadium. Those friendly matches, which are believed to create a high interest from spectators, will also continue to be played at Parken. For example, the friendly against Germany in August 2010 was played at Parken Stadium due to the high expectation of spectators desiring to watch the match. However, after Denmark's performance at the 2010 World Cup, the friendly only drew 19,071 spectators. From September 1992 to January 2012, Denmark played a total of 77 A-level matches at Parken Stadium, of which 49 were won, 16 were drawn and 12 lost.

== Results and fixtures ==
The following is a list of match results in the last 12 months, as well as any future matches that have been scheduled.

Win Draw Loss Fixture

=== 2026 ===
26 March 2026 2026 World Cup qualification play-offs	Denmark	4–0	North Macedonia	Copenhagen, Denmark
20:45 CET	Damsgaard 49'; Isaksen 58', 59'; Nørgaard 75'	Report		Stadium: Parken Stadium; Attendance: 35,746; Referee: Felix Zwayer (Germany)

31 March 2026 2026 World Cup qualification play-offs	Czech Republic	2–2 (a.e.t.) (3–1 p)	Denmark	Prague, Czech Republic
20:45 CEST	Šulc 3'; Krejčí 100'	Report (FIFA); Report (UEFA)	Andersen 72'; Høgh 111'	Stadium: Stadion Letná; Attendance: 18,215; Referee: Maurizio Mariani (Italy)
	Penalties
	Chorý (penalty scored); Souček (penalty scored); Krejčí (penalty missed); Sadílek (penalty scored)		(penalty missed) Højlund; (penalty scored) Eriksen; (penalty missed) Dreyer; (penalty missed) Jensen

3 June 2026 Friendly	Denmark	0–0	DR Congo	Liège, Belgium
20:00 UTC+2		Report		Stadium: Stade Maurice Dufrasne; Attendance: 23,043; Referee: Lothar D'Hondt (Belgium)

7 June 2026 Friendly	Denmark	2–1 (Abandoned)	Ukraine	Odense, Denmark
18:30 UTC+2	Dorgu 13'; Mæhle 36'	Report	Tsyhankov 44'	Stadium: Odense Stadium; Referee: Sigurd Kringstad (Norway)
Note: The match was abandoned after the 79th minute, following Denmark midfielder Christian Eriksen suffering an on-field collapse.

24 September 2026 2026–27 UEFA Nations League	Norway	3–2	Denmark	Oslo, Norway
20:45 UTC+2	Bobb 14'; Haaland 18', 74'	Report	Damsgaard 25'; Højlund 60'	Stadium: Ullevaal Stadion; Attendance: 25,002; Referee: Tobias Stieler (Germany)

27 September 2026 2026–27 UEFA Nations League	Denmark	2–0	Wales	Copenhagen, Denmark
18:00 UTC+2	Davies 53' (o.g.); Isaksen 60'	Report		Stadium: Parken Stadium; Attendance: 34,588; Referee: Willy Delajod (France)

1 October 2026 2026–27 UEFA Nations League	Denmark	2–4	Portugal	Copenhagen, Denmark
20:45 UTC+2	Damsgaard 23'; Højlund 53'	Report	Cancelo 13'; Ramos 25'; Vitinha 67'; Félix 87'	Stadium: Parken Stadium; Attendance: 35,951; Referee: Mykola Balakin (Ukraine)

4 October 2026 2026–27 UEFA Nations League	Wales	0–1	Denmark	Cardiff, Wales
19:45 UTC+1		Report	Højlund 75' (pen.)	Stadium: Cardiff City Stadium; Attendance: 25,108; Referee: Irfan Peljto (Bosnia and Herzegovina)

14 November 2026 2026–27 UEFA Nations League	Portugal	1–4	Denmark	Braga, Portugal
19:45 UTC+0	Silva 90+3'	Report	Højbjerg 43' (pen.); Højlund 50', 57'; Andersen 75'	Stadium: Estádio Municipal de Braga; Attendance: 24,879; Referee: Rade Obrenovič (Slovenia)

17 November 2026 2026–27 UEFA Nations League	Denmark	2–3	Norway	Copenhagen, Denmark
20:45 UTC+1	Højlund 11'; Højbjerg 14'	Report	Haaland 37', 90+6' (pen.); Ødegaard 83'	Stadium: Parken Stadium; Attendance: 36,047; Referee: Halil Umut Meler (Turkey)

== Coaching staff ==
As of 13 October 2026

Coaching staff
Position	Name
Head Coach	(Denmark) Brian Riemer
Assistant Coach	(Denmark) Daniel Agger
Assistant Coach	(Denmark) Kent Nielsen
Set Piece Coach	(Denmark) Thor Herdal
Fitness Coach	(United States) Ahron Thode
Goalkeeping Coach	(Denmark) Kim Christensen
Match Analysts	(Denmark) Thomas Sørensen (Denmark) Christian Kejser

Medical staff
Position	Name
Doctor	(Denmark) Morten Boesen
Physiotherapists	(Denmark) Morten Skjoldager (Denmark) Tom Boysen (Denmark) Mikkel Ottesen (Denmark) Benno Gøttsche
Sports Psychologist	(Denmark) Carsten Hvid

=== Managers ===
The responsibility and job description for the manager of the Denmark national football team has changed throughout the history. From 1908 to 1918, the DBU preferred to assign a manager with the overall responsibility. This was followed by a long era from 1919 to 1956 where either no manager or only a caretaker manager was assigned. When the DBU assigned Arne Sørensen (November 1956 – December 1961) and Poul Petersen (January 1962 –December 1966) as managers for a rolling period of several years, they were given the responsibility to coach the physical training and decide the team tactics before and during each match, but had no influence upon the selection of players for the national squad, which was a job for the specially-appointed selection committee, the UdtagelsesKomitéen.

From 1967 to 1969, the management of the team more or less became a sole responsibility for the UdtagelsesKomitéen, following a new approach. In this new approach, the job to select players continued to be the responsibility for the UdtagelsesKomitéen, but the chairman of the committee was now also appointed to be the "tactical manager" of the national team, as the DBU realized the need of having a special tactical manager assigned to get influence upon both the selection of players and the related tactics before and during the game. However, the appointed tactical manager did not have the responsibility to train the squad, as a special physical coach was instead selected for that job. In 1970, the approach with two managers assigned was again abandoned when the DBU realized the need to assign only one manager with the sole responsibility for the squad.

From 1970 to 1979, the job to select players was not yet a sole responsibility of the manager alone, but only a shared responsibility, as this continued to be a matter for the UdtagelsesKomitéen to decide. When a selection of players had to be made, it was decided by a vote in the committee, with the appointed manager being granted an influence of three votes and the four members of the committee being granted one vote each. This special selection procedure continued until July 1979, where it was decided to award the sole responsibility of all manager-related areas to the manager himself, with the assignment of Sepp Piontek as the first full-time professional manager of the national team.

==== Manager history ====
This is a complete overview of every national team manager since the first official game in October 1908. From 1911 to 1961, a total of 169 games were played without a designated manager.

Manager	From	To	Record					Notes
Manager	From	To	M	W	D	L	Win %	Notes
(England) Charlie Williams	October 1908	December 1910	4	3	0	1	75.00	
No manager	January 1911	December 1912	5	3	0	2	60.00	
(Denmark) Axel Andersen Byrval	January 1913; January 1917	December 1915; December 1918	16	14	1	1	87.50	
No manager	January 1916; January 1919	December 1916; July 1920	10	5	1	4	50.00	
Caretaker manager	August 1920	August 1920	1	0	0	1	0.00	
No manager	September 1920	December 1938	77	35	13	29	45.45	
Caretaker managers	January 1939	October 1956	18	10	3	5	55.56	
No manager	July 1939	September 1956	74	29	11	34	39.19	
(Denmark) Arne Sørensen	November 1956	December 1961	41	20	8	13	48.78	
No manager	June 1957	September 1961	3	1	0	2	33.33	
(Denmark) Poul Petersen	January 1962	December 1966	47	17	8	22	36.17	
(Denmark) Erik Hansen (tactical coach) (Austria) Ernst Netuka (training coach)	January 1967	December 1967	8	4	2	2	50.00	
(Denmark) Erik Hansen (Denmark) Henry From (training coach)	January 1968	January 1969	11	4	1	6	36.36	
(Denmark) John Hansen (tactical coach) (Denmark) Henry From (training coach)	February 1969	December 1969	9	5	1	3	55.56	
(Austria) Rudi Strittich	January 1970	December 1975	61	20	11	30	32.79	Qualified for the 1972 Summer Olympics — reached Quarter-finals
(Denmark) Kurt Nielsen	January 1976	June 1979	31	13	6	12	41.94	
(Germany) Sepp Piontek	1 July 1979	April 1990	115	52	24	39	45.22	Euro 1984 — Semi-finals; 1986 World Cup — Round of 16; Euro 1988 — Group stage
(Denmark) Richard Møller Nielsen	May 1987; May 1990	May 1988 (Note: Nielsen coached 8 games in the 1988 Olympics qualification, winning 6, drawing 1, and losing 1.); June 1996	73	40	18	15	54.79	(gold) Euro 1992 — Champions; (gold) 1995 Confederations Cup — Champions; Euro 1996 — Group stage
(Sweden) Bo Johansson	July 1996	June 2000	40	17	9	14	42.50	1998 World Cup — Quarter-finals; Euro 2000 — Group stage
(Denmark) Morten Olsen	July 2000	November 2015	166	80	42	44	48.19	2002 World Cup — Round of 16; Euro 2004 — Quarter-finals; 2010 World Cup — Group stage Euro 2012 — Group stage
(Norway) Åge Hareide	December 2015	31 July 2020	42	21	18	3	50.00	2018 World Cup — Round of 16; Euro 2020 — Qualified
(Denmark) John Jensen (caretaker) (Note: Caretaker manager for Denmark's replacement squad of predominantly amateur players in a friendly match against Slovakia.)	5 September 2018		1	0	0	1	0.00	
(Denmark) Kasper Hjulmand	1 August 2020	19 July 2024	54	32	8	14	59.26	Euro 2020 — Semi-finals; 2022 World Cup — Group stage Euro 2024 — Round of 16
(Denmark) Ebbe Sand (caretaker) (Note: Ebbe Sand was caretaker on 11 November 2020, while Hjulmand was unable to perform duties. Sand was given credit for the match result.)	11 November 2020		1	1	0	0	100.00	
(Denmark) Lars Knudsen (caretaker)	26 August 2024	24 October 2024	4	2	1	1	50.00	
(Denmark) Brian Riemer (Note: As of match played 14 November 2026) (Note: Denmark was leading Ukraine 2–1 on 7 June 2026 before the match was abandoned in the 79th minute. The game is not included in this match total.)	24 October 2024		20	10	5	5	50.00	
Total			932	438	191	303	47.00	

==== Manager records ====
- Longest reign: Morten Olsen, 15 years
- Most wins: Morten Olsen, 80

== Players ==
=== Current squad ===
The following players were selected for the UEFA Nations League matches against Portugal and Norway on 14 and 17 November 2026, respectively.
Caps and goals correct as of 17 November 2026, following the match against Norway

No.	Pos.	Player	Date of birth (age)	Caps	Goals	Club
1	GK	Andreas Jungdal	22 February 2002 (age 24)	0	0	(Royal Belgian Football Association) Westerlo
16	GK	Mads Hermansen	11 July 2000 (age 26)	7	0	(The Football Association) West Ham United
22	GK	Andreas Hansen	11 August 1995 (age 31)	0	0	(Danish Football Association) Nordsjælland
2	DF	Joachim Andersen (3rd captain)	31 May 1996 (age 30)	57	3	(The Football Association) Fulham
3	DF	Oliver Provstgaard	4 June 2003 (age 23)	8	0	(Italian Football Federation) Lazio
4	DF	Rasmus Nicolaisen	16 March 1997 (age 29)	0	0	(French Football Federation) Toulouse
5	DF	Joakim Mæhle	20 May 1997 (age 29)	65	12	(German Football Association) VfL Wolfsburg
6	DF	Victor Nelsson	14 October 1998 (age 28)	19	0	(Danish Football Association) Nordsjælland
13	DF	Rasmus Kristensen	11 July 1997 (age 29)	39	2	(Danish Football Association) Midtjylland
15	DF	Victor Bak Jensen	3 October 2003 (age 23)	0	0	(Danish Football Association) Midtjylland
18	DF	Alexander Bah	9 December 1997 (age 28)	25	1	(Portuguese Football Federation) Benfica
7	MF	Mathias Jensen	1 January 1996 (age 30)	34	1	(The Football Association) Brentford
12	MF	Victor Froholdt	25 February 2006 (age 20)	18	1	(Portuguese Football Federation) Porto
20	MF	Albert Grønbæk	23 May 2001 (age 25)	10	1	(German Football Association) Hamburger SV
21	MF	Morten Hjulmand	25 June 1999 (age 27)	33	1	(Royal Spanish Football Federation) Atlético Madrid
23	MF	Pierre-Emile Højbjerg (captain)	5 August 1995 (age 31)	103	13	(French Football Federation) Marseille
	MF	Mads Bidstrup	25 February 2001 (age 25)	1	0	(French Football Federation) Lyon
8	FW	Gustav Isaksen	19 April 2001 (age 25)	21	7	(Italian Football Federation) Lazio
9	FW	Rasmus Højlund	4 February 2003 (age 23)	41	19	(Italian Football Federation) Napoli
10	FW	William Osula	4 August 2003 (age 23)	4	0	(The Football Association) Newcastle United
11	FW	Andreas Skov Olsen	29 December 1999 (age 26)	42	8	(Turkish Football Federation) Başakşehir
14	FW	Mikkel Damsgaard	3 July 2000 (age 26)	45	10	(The Football Association) Brentford
17	FW	Jesper Lindstrøm	29 February 2000 (age 26)	18	1	(Austrian Football Association) Salzburg
19	FW	Mohamed Daramy	7 January 2002 (age 24)	15	1	(French Football Federation) Reims

=== Recent call-ups ===
The following players were also called up within the last twelve months.

Pos.	Player	Date of birth (age)	Caps	Goals	Club	Latest call-up
GK	Filip Jörgensen	16 April 2002 (age 24)	4	0	(France) Strasbourg	v. Norway, 17 November 2026
GK	Frederik Rønnow	4 August 1992 (age 34)	10	0	(Germany) Union Berlin	v. Czech Republic, 31 March 2026
DF	Lucas Høgsberg	23 June 2006 (age 20)	6	0	(France) Strasbourg	v. Wales, 4 October 2026
DF	Anton Gaaei	19 November 2002 (age 24)	2	0	(Netherlands) Ajax	v. Wales, 4 October 2026
DF	Patrick Dorgu	28 October 2004 (age 22)	16	4	(England) Manchester United	v. Wales, 27 September 2026 ^{INJ}
DF	Andreas Christensen	10 April 1996 (age 30)	81	4	(Spain) Barcelona	v. Norway, 24 September 2026 ^{INJ}
MF	Thomas Jørgensen	30 September 2005 (age 21)	1	0	(France) Toulouse	v. Wales, 4 October 2026
MF	Nikolas Nartey	22 February 2000 (age 26)	2	0	(Germany) VfB Stuttgart	v. Portugal, 1 October 2026 ^{INJ}
MF	Christian Eriksen (vice-captain)	14 February 1992 (age 34)	151	46	Unattached	v. Ukraine, 7 June 2026 ^{MED}
MF	Jens Stage	8 November 1996 (age 30)	2	0	(Germany) Werder Bremen	v. Ukraine, 7 June 2026
MF	Jacob Trenskow	26 November 2000 (age 25)	0	0	(Netherlands) Heerenveen	v. Ukraine, 7 June 2026
MF	Christian Nørgaard ^{RET}	10 March 1994 (age 32)	41	2	(England) Everton	v. Czech Republic, 31 March 2026
MF	Noah Nartey	5 October 2005 (age 21)	0	0	(France) Lyon	v. Czech Republic, 31 March 2026
MF	Philip Billing	11 June 1996 (age 30)	6	0	(Denmark) Midtjylland	v. North Macedonia, 26 March 2026
FW	Kasper Høgh	6 December 2000 (age 25)	8	1	(Scotland) Celtic	v. Wales, 4 October 2026
FW	Adam Daghim	28 September 2005 (age 21)	4	0	(Germany) TSG Hoffenheim	v. Wales, 4 October 2026
FW	Mathias Kvistgaarden	15 April 2002 (age 24)	2	0	(England) Norwich City	v. Wales, 4 October 2026
FW	Kasper Dolberg	6 October 1997 (age 29)	56	12	(Netherlands) Ajax	v. Norway, 24 September 2026 ^{INJ}
FW	Anders Dreyer	2 May 1998 (age 28)	9	3	(United States) San Diego	v. Czech Republic, 31 March 2026
Notes: ^{INJ} = Withdrew due to injury; ^{MED} = Withdrew for non-injury related medical reasons; ^{PRE} = Preliminary squad; ^{ST} = Standby; ^{SUS} = Serving suspension; ^{RET} = Retired from national team

=== Player history ===
The players are freely chosen by the national team manager. They are normally assembled from their respective club teams at the Hotel Marienlyst in Elsinore for a week-long training camp preluding the upcoming match. Friendly matches are typically played on a Wednesday evening. World Cup qualifiers are played on both Saturday and Wednesday evenings, while Euro qualifiers now take place on both a Friday and Tuesday evening when playing two matches in a row, or on a Friday/Saturday/Tuesday at rounds with only one match scheduled.

=== Best players of all time ===
In November 2006, the DBU nominated eight Denmark national team footballers for the "Best Danish Footballer of All Time" award. The nominated players were Morten Olsen, Henning Jensen, Allan Simonsen, Preben Elkjær, Michael Laudrup, Brian Laudrup, Peter Schmeichel and Jon Dahl Tomasson. The winner of the award was decided by a public vote arranged by the broadcasting channel TV2, which ended with Michael Laudrup as a clear winner, with 58% of the votes.

=== Hall of Fame ===
Denmark's Hall of Fame was established in October 2008, as a special award to celebrate the best footballers, teams and coaches; throughout the history of the national team. A jury with six people (representing the newspapers, authors of football books, active players of the national team, TV2, the DBU, and a Hall of Fame member), each year has the job to award one or two new members for the Hall of Fame. The award is handed out at the official Danish Football Awards, which is a yearly television broadcast event – organized by the DBU in November throughout 2008 to 2013 and subsequently moved to a later date in February. Besides receiving the award, all Hall of Fame members are also invited to leave a footprint in bronze, to decorate the entrance hall at "Fodboldens hus" -the DBU headquarters in Brøndby. When the DBU celebrated its 125-year anniversary in May 2014, it decided to make an extraordinary award of nine additional Hall of Fame Members, all playing during the first half of the DBU national team's existence, from 1908 to 1964. Because of financial restraints, the DBU cancelled the planned televised broadcast of the Football Award in February 2015, and for the same reason opted not to award any new Hall of Fame members in this specific year. The DBU expected to return awarding new Hall of Fame members again, when the next broadcast Football Award event was organized in February 2016.

=== Payment ===
Each national team player receives a set amount of money per match, including bonuses for a win and qualification for European Championship and World Cup tournaments. Throughout the years, the prize money has gone from around €1,340 for a match win in 1987 and around €26,800 for the Euro 1988 participation alone, to around €67,000 for the 1998 World Cup, and up to €107,000 for the 2002 World Cup, per player.

Currently, the payments for participation in games outside the big tournaments are regulated by a collective agreement – to be renegotiated after a certain number of years – while all payments for participation of players in a final tournament squad are regulated by the "1998 agreement" between the DBU and Spillerforeningen. The "1998 agreement" stipulates that whenever the national team qualifies for a World Cup or European Championship tournament, the selected players for the final tournament shall receive 50% of the DBU's revenues from the event, and 65% of the DBU's revenues from the sale of merchandise and license agreements. Additionally, the sponsors of the national team also pay a relatively high "qualification bonus" each time the team qualifies for a final tournament. This bonus is shared between the group of players being selected for the final 18-man squad, to one or several of the qualification matches played, with the exact distribution normally decided according to the number of times the player was selected.

Each of the 23 selected players for the 2002 World Cup received DKK 498,000 (equal to €66,800) from the event revenues, plus DKK 122,900 (equal to €16,500) from the sale of merchandise and license agreements, plus an unknown qualification bonus from the sponsors, plus the standard payment from the DBU each time they were selected for the final 18-man squad to a qualification match. In comparison, each of the 23 selected players for the 2010 World Cup received DKK 635,000 (equal to €85,100) from the event revenues, plus DKK 98,900 (equal to €13,200) from the sale of merchandise and license agreements, plus a qualification bonus from the sponsors at DKK 2,800,000 (equal to €375,000) to be shared between the players – corresponding to an amount of €2,080 per time the player was selected for the final 18-man squad to a qualification match. In addition to the qualification bonus, the players also received this standard payment from the DBU each time they were selected for the 18-man squad to a qualification match:

- Starting fee: home games = DKK 1,2 per spectator, away games = DKK 8,290
- Bonus for a draw: home games = DKK 0, away games = DKK 9,475
- Bonus for a win: home games = DKK 17,765, away games = DKK 29,600

Based on Denmark's results and number of spectators at home matches, the standard qualification match payment to a player selected for all of Denmark's qualification matches equals a total amount of DKK 235,898 (or €31,600) for the six qualification matches in the 2008–09 season, and a total amount of DKK 170,788 (or €22,900) for the four qualification matches in the 2009–10 season. Finally, the players could also add a seasonal payment named "regular bonus" from the sponsors, with a total of DKK 4,350,000 (equal to €583,100) to be shared each season by the squad of 18 players selected for a match, meaning a player who was selected for all national team matches from 1 August to 31 July would receive an additional DKK 241,700 (equal to €32,400) payment in both the 2008–09 and 2009–10 seasons.

The last amount of a players income generated by the national team is the standard payment received for each friendly match:

- Starting fee: home games = DKK 1,0 per spectator, away games = DKK 5,000
- Bonus for a draw: home games = DKK 0, away games = DKK 0
- Bonus for a win: home games = DKK 10,000, away games = DKK 10,000

Based on Denmark's results and number of spectators at home matches, the standard payment to a player selected for all Denmark's friendly matches equals a total amount of DKK 41,426 (or €5,500) for the three friendly matches in the 2008–09 season, and a total amount of DKK 88,773 (or €11,900) for the seven friendly matches in the 2009–10 season.

When all these payments are added together for a player, under the assumption a player was selected for all matches in each season as well as the final 2010 World Cup squad, he would have received a total payment from the DBU of €69,500 in the 2008–09 season and a total payment from the DBU of €186,300 in the 2009–10 season.

== Player records ==
As of 7 June 2026.
Players listed in bold are still active with Denmark.

=== Most appearances ===
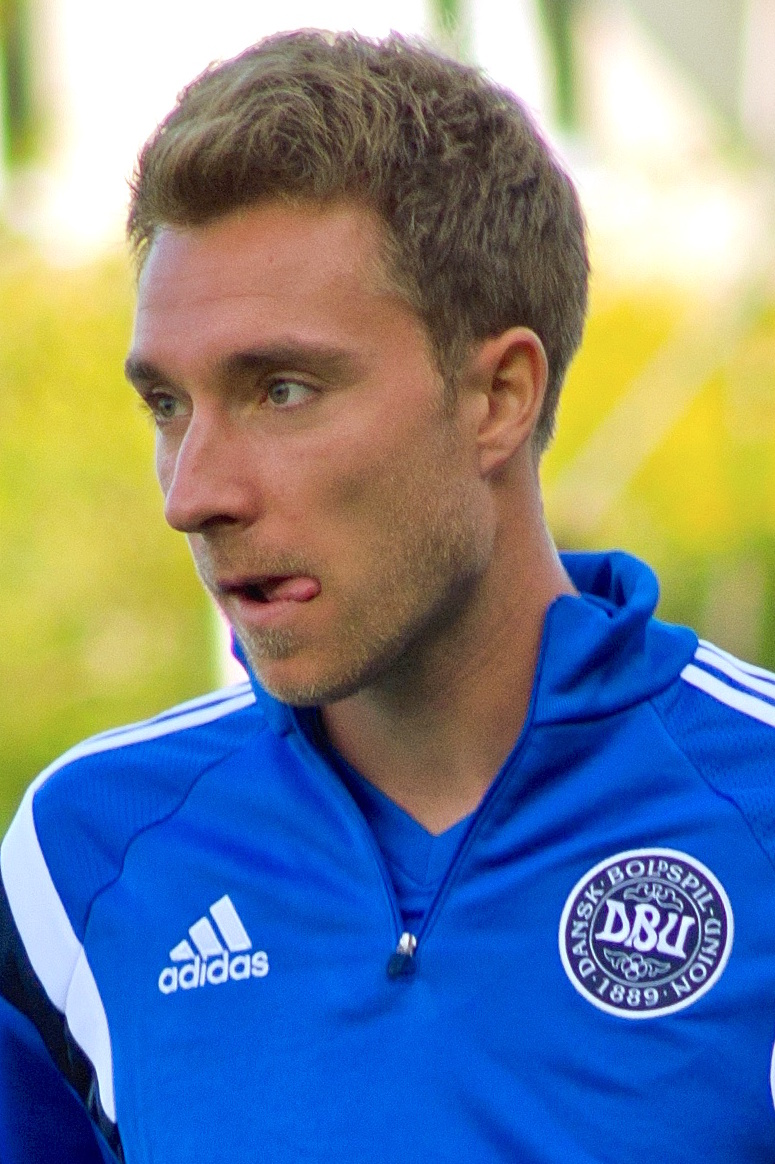
Christian Eriksen is Denmark's most capped player with 151 appearances.

Rank	Player	Caps	Goals	Position	Period
1	**Christian Eriksen**	151	46	MF	2010–present
2	Simon Kjær	132	5	DF	2009–2024
3	Peter Schmeichel	129	1	GK	1987–2001
4	Dennis Rommedahl	126	21	MF	2000–2013
5	Kasper Schmeichel	120	0	GK	2013–2025
6	Jon Dahl Tomasson	112	52	FW	1997–2010
7	Thomas Helveg	108	2	DF	1994–2007
8	Michael Laudrup	104	37	MF/FW	1982–1998
9	**Pierre-Emile Højbjerg**	102	12	MF	2014–present
9	Martin Jørgensen	102	12	MF	1998–2011
9	Morten Olsen	102	4	DF	1970–1989

=== Top goalscorers ===
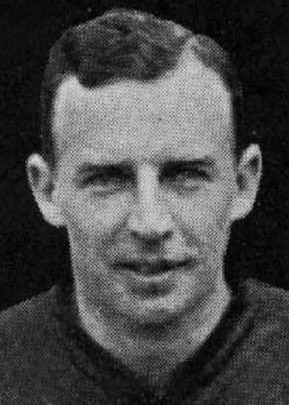
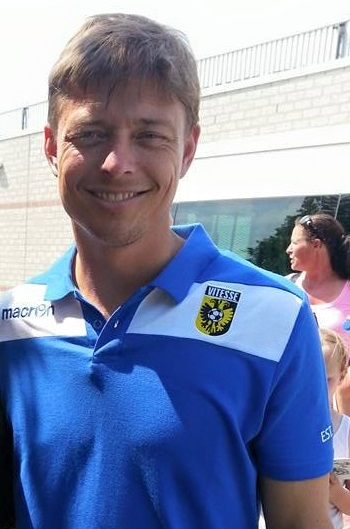
Poul Nielsen and Jon Dahl Tomasson are Denmark's joint all-time top scorers with 52 goals each.

Rank	Player	Goals	Caps	Average	Period
1	Poul Nielsen (list)	52	38	1.37	1910–1925
1	Jon Dahl Tomasson	52	112	0.46	1997–2010
3	**Christian Eriksen**	46	151	0.3	2010–present
4	Pauli Jørgensen	44	47	0.94	1925–1939
5	Ole Madsen	42	50	0.84	1958–1969
6	Preben Elkjær	38	69	0.55	1977–1988
7	Michael Laudrup	37	104	0.36	1982–1998
8	Nicklas Bendtner	30	81	0.37	2006–2018
9	Henning Enoksen	29	54	0.54	1958–1966
10	Michael Rohde	22	40	0.55	1915–1931
10	Ebbe Sand	22	66	0.33	1998–2004

=== European Cup-winning captains ===
Year	Player	Caps	Goals	Position	Period
1992	Lars Olsen	84	4	DF	1986–1996

== Competitive record ==
=== FIFA World Cup ===
FIFA World Cup record										Qualification record					
Year	Result	Position	Pld	W	D	L	GF	GA	Squad	Pld	W	D	L	GF	GA
(Uruguay) 1930	Did not enter									Declined invitation					
(Italy) 1934	Did not enter									Did not enter					
(France) 1938	Did not enter									Did not enter					
(Brazil) 1950	Did not enter									Did not enter					
(Switzerland) 1954	Did not enter									Did not enter					
(Sweden) 1958	Did not qualify									4	0	0	4	4	13
(Chile) 1962	Did not enter									Did not enter					
(England) 1966	Did not qualify									6	1	1	4	7	18
(Mexico) 1970	Did not qualify									6	2	1	3	6	10
(West Germany) 1974	Did not qualify									4	0	1	3	2	13
(Argentina) 1978	Did not qualify									6	2	0	4	14	12
(Spain) 1982	Did not qualify									8	4	0	4	14	11
(Mexico) 1986	Round of 16	9th	4	3	0	1	10	6	Squad	8	5	1	2	17	6
(Italy) 1990	Did not qualify									6	3	2	1	15	6
(United States) 1994	Did not qualify									12	7	4	1	15	2
(France) 1998	Quarter-finals	8th	5	2	1	2	9	7	Squad	8	5	2	1	14	6
(South Korea) (Japan) 2002	Round of 16	10th	4	2	1	1	5	5	Squad	10	6	4	0	22	6
(Germany) 2006	Did not qualify									12	6	4	2	24	12
(South Africa) 2010	Group stage	24th	3	1	0	2	3	6	Squad	10	6	3	1	16	5
(Brazil) 2014	Did not qualify									10	4	4	2	17	12
(Russia) 2018	Round of 16	11th	4	1	3	0	3	2	Squad	12	7	3	2	25	9
(Qatar) 2022	Group stage	28th	3	0	1	2	1	3	Squad	10	9	0	1	30	3
(Canada) (Mexico) (United States) 2026	Did not qualify									8	4	3	1	22	9
(Morocco) (Portugal) (Spain) 2030	To be determined									To be determined					
(Saudi Arabia) 2034	To be determined									To be determined					
Total	Quarter-finals	6/23	23	9	6	8	31	29	—	140	71	33	36	264	153

*Draws include knockout matches decided via penalty shoot-out.

Denmark's World Cup history
First match	Scotland 0–1 Denmark (Nezahualcóyotl, Mexico; 4 June 1986)
Biggest win	Denmark 6–1 Uruguay (Nezahualcóyotl, Mexico; 8 June 1986)
Biggest defeat	Denmark 1–5 Spain (Querétaro, Mexico; 18 June 1986)
Best result	Quarter-finals (1998)
Worst result	Group stage (2010, 2022)

=== UEFA European Championship ===
UEFA European Championship record										Qualifying record					
Year	Result	Position	Pld	W	D	L	GF	GA	Squad	Pld	W	D	L	GF	GA
(France) 1960	Did not qualify									2	0	1	1	3	7
(Spain) 1964	Fourth place	4th	2	0	0	2	1	6	Squad	7	4	2	1	19	8
(Italy) 1968	Did not qualify									6	1	1	4	6	16
(Belgium) 1972	Did not qualify									6	1	0	5	2	11
(Socialist Federal Republic of Yugoslavia) 1976	Did not qualify									6	0	1	5	3	14
(Italy) 1980	Did not qualify									8	1	2	5	13	17
(France) 1984	Semi-finals	3rd	4	2	1	1	9	4	Squad	8	6	1	1	17	5
(West Germany) 1988	Group stage	7th	3	0	0	3	2	7	Squad	6	3	2	1	4	2
(Sweden) 1992	Champions	1st	5	2	2	1	6	4	Squad	8	6	1	1	18	7
(England) 1996	Group stage	9th	3	1	1	1	4	4	Squad	10	6	3	1	19	9
(Belgium) (Netherlands) 2000	Group stage	16th	3	0	0	3	0	8	Squad	10	6	2	2	19	8
(Portugal) 2004	Quarter-finals	8th	4	1	2	1	4	5	Squad	8	4	3	1	15	9
(Austria) (Switzerland) 2008	Did not qualify									12	6	2	4	21	11
(Poland) (Ukraine) 2012	Group stage	12th	3	1	0	2	4	5	Squad	8	6	1	1	15	6
(France) 2016	Did not qualify									10	3	4	3	11	9
(Europe) 2020	Semi-finals	3rd	6	3	0	3	12	7	Squad	8	4	4	0	23	6
(Germany) 2024	Round of 16	16th	4	0	3	1	2	4	Squad	10	7	1	2	19	10
(England) (Scotland) (Republic of Ireland) (Wales) 2028	To be determined									To be determined					
(Italy) (Turkey) 2032	To be determined									To be determined					
Total	1 Title	10/17	37	10	9	18	44	54	—	133	64	31	38	227	155

Denmark's European Championship history
First match	Denmark 0–3 Soviet Union (Barcelona, Spain; 17 June 1964)
Biggest win	Denmark 5–0 Yugoslavia (Lyon, France; 16 June 1984)
Biggest defeat	Denmark 0–3 Soviet Union (Barcelona, Spain; 17 June 1964); Croatia 3–0 Denmark (Sheffield, England; 16 June 1996); France 3–0 Denmark (Bruges, Belgium; 11 June 2000); Denmark 0–3 Netherlands (Rotterdam, Netherlands; 16 June 2000); Czech Republic 3–0 Denmark (Porto, Portugal; 27 June 2004)
Best result	Champions (1992)
Worst result	Group stage (1988, 1996, 2000, 2012)

=== UEFA Nations League ===
UEFA Nations League record
Season	Division	Group	Round	Pld	W	D	L	GF	GA	P/R	RK
2018–19	B	4	Group stage	4	2	2	0	4	1	▲	15th
2020–21	A	2	Group stage	6	3	1	2	8	7	Same position	7th
2022–23	A	1	Group stage	6	4	0	2	9	5	Same position	5th
2024–25	A	4	Group stage	6	2	2	2	7	5	Same position	7th
2024–25	A	Quarter-final		2	1	0	1	3	5	Same position	7th
2026–27	A	4	Group stage	6	3	0	3	13	11	TBD	11st
2026–27	A	Relegation play-off		0	0	0	0	0	0	TBD	11st
Total			Quarter-finals	30	15	5	10	44	34	5th	

=== CONMEBOL–UEFA Cup of Champions ===
CONMEBOL–UEFA Cup of Champions record
Year	Result	Position	Pld	W	D*	L	GF	GA
(France) 1985	Did not qualify							
(Argentina) 1993	Runners-up	2nd	1	0	1	0	1	1
(England) 2022	Did not qualify							
Total	Runners-up	1/3	1	0	1	0	1	1

*Draws include knockout matches decided via penalty shoot-out.

=== FIFA Confederations Cup ===
FIFA Confederations Cup record
Year	Result	Position	Pld	W	D*	L	GF	GA	Squad
(Saudi Arabia) 1992	Did not enter								
(Saudi Arabia) 1995	Champions	1st	3	2	1	0	5	1	Squad
(Saudi Arabia) 1997	Did not qualify								
(Mexico) 1999	Did not qualify								
(South Korea) (Japan) 2001	Did not qualify								
(France) 2003	Did not qualify								
(Germany) 2005	Did not qualify								
(South Africa) 2009	Did not qualify								
(Brazil) 2013	Did not qualify								
(Russia) 2017	Did not qualify								
Total	1 Title	1/10	3	2	1	0	5	1	—

=== Olympic Games ===
Olympic Games record
Year	Result	Position	Pld	W	D	L	GF	GA	Squad
(France) Paris 1900	Only club teams participated								
(United States) St. Louis 1904	Only club teams participated								
(United Kingdom) London 1908	Silver medal	2nd	3	2	0	1	26	3	Squad
(Sweden) Stockholm 1912	Silver medal	2nd	3	2	0	1	13	5	Squad
(Belgium) Antwerp 1920	Group stage	8th	1	0	0	1	0	1	Squad
(France) Paris 1924	Did not enter								
(Netherlands) Amsterdam 1928	Did not enter								
(Nazi Germany) Berlin 1936	Did not enter								
(United Kingdom) London 1948	Bronze medal	3rd	4	3	0	1	15	11	Squad
(Finland) Helsinki 1952	Quarter-finals	5th	3	2	0	1	7	6	Squad
(Australia) Melbourne 1956	Did not enter								
(Italy) Rome 1960	Silver medal	2nd	5	4	0	1	11	7	Squad
(Japan) Tokyo 1964	Did not qualify								
Mexico City 1968	Did not enter								
(West Germany) Munich 1972	Quarter-finals	6th	6	3	1	2	11	7	Squad
(Canada) Montréal 1976	Did not qualify								
(Soviet Union) Moscow 1980	Did not enter								
(United States) Los Angeles 1984	Did not qualify								
(South Korea) Seoul 1988	Did not qualify								
Since 1992	See Denmark national under-21 football team								
Total	3 Silver medals	7/17	25	16	1	8	83	40	—

== Head-to-head record ==
As of 14 November 2026 after the match against Portugal.

Positive Record Neutral Record Negative Record

Opponent	Pld	W	D	L	GF	GA	GD
Albania	10	6	3	1	19	4	+15
Algeria	1	0	1	0	0	0	0
Argentina	2	1	1	0	3	1	+2
Armenia	8	6	1	1	13	7	+6
Australia	5	2	1	2	6	4	+2
Austria	13	8	1	4	24	15	+9
Belarus	4	2	2	0	9	2	+7
Belgium	16	6	3	7	26	29	-3
Benin	1	0	0	1	0	2	−2
Bermuda	2	2	0	0	11	1	+10
Bosnia and Herzegovina	6	2	2	2	7	8	−1
Brazil	3	1	0	2	7	6	+1
Bulgaria	16	4	8	4	21	20	+1
Cameroon	3	2	0	1	5	4	+1
Canada	1	1	0	0	2	0	+2
Chile	2	0	1	1	1	2	−1
Croatia	8	2	2	4	8	11	−3
Curaçao	2	2	0	0	6	3	+3
Cyprus	6	5	1	0	21	3	+18
Czech Republic (Note: Includes matches against Czechoslovakia.)	27	3	12	12	20	44	−24
DR Congo	1	0	1	0	0	0	0
East Germany	6	2	2	2	10	10	0
Egypt	3	2	1	0	7	2	+5
England	27	6	6	16	29	49	−20
Estonia	1	0	1	0	2	2	0
Faroe Islands	7	7	0	0	20	2	+18
Finland	62	41	10	11	157	60	+97
France	18	8	2	9	42	23	+19
Gambia	1	1	0	0	4	1	+3
Georgia	5	3	2	0	15	5	+10
Germany (Note: Includes matches against West Germany.)	28	8	5	15	38	55	−17
Ghana	1	1	0	0	1	0	+1
Gibraltar	2	2	0	0	12	0	+12
Greece	18	11	4	3	40	19	+21
Honduras	1	0	0	1	0	1	−1
Hungary	16	3	4	9	16	40	−24
Iceland	25	21	4	0	78	15	+63
Indonesia	1	1	0	0	9	0	+9
Iran	2	1	1	0	4	0	+4
Israel	10	9	0	1	25	4	+21
Italy	13	3	2	8	16	24	−8
Japan	2	1	0	1	4	5	−1
Jordan	1	0	0	1	2	3	−1
Kazakhstan	6	5	0	1	17	7	+10
Kosovo	1	0	1	0	2	2	0
Latvia	4	3	1	0	7	1	+6
Liechtenstein	3	3	0	0	13	0	+13
Lithuania	3	2	1	0	9	0	+9
Luxembourg	11	9	2	0	33	8	+25
North Macedonia	4	2	1	1	6	4	+2
Malta	9	9	0	0	32	4	+28
Mexico	4	2	1	1	6	5	+1
Moldova	2	2	0	0	12	0	+12
Montenegro	3	2	0	1	3	2	+1
Morocco	1	1	0	0	3	1	+2
Netherlands	32	9	10	13	45	63	−18
Nigeria	1	1	0	0	4	1	+3
Northern Ireland	14	6	5	3	17	12	+5
Norway	91	55	14	22	232	109	+123
Panama	1	1	0	0	1	0	+1
Paraguay	2	0	1	1	2	3	−1
Peru	1	1	0	0	1	0	+1
Poland	22	12	2	8	46	37	+9
Portugal	19	5	2	12	27	41	−14
Republic of Ireland	19	4	10	5	23	23	0
Romania	18	6	4	8	27	34	−7
Russia (Note: Includes matches against the Soviet Union and the CIS.)	13	2	1	10	14	37	−23
San Marino	2	2	0	0	6	1	+5
Saudi Arabia	3	3	0	0	4	0	+4
Scotland	20	7	1	12	16	26	−10
Senegal	3	2	1	0	6	3	+3
Serbia (Note: Includes matches against Yugoslavia.)	15	6	2	7	25	25	0
Slovakia	3	1	0	2	3	7	−4
Slovenia	7	5	2	0	15	4	+11
South Africa	3	0	2	1	2	3	−1
South Korea	1	0	1	0	0	0	0
Spain	19	2	3	14	16	37	−21
Suriname	1	0	0	1	1	2	−1
Switzerland	15	5	8	2	21	16	+5
Sweden	109	43	20	46	178	187	−9
Togo	1	1	0	0	2	0	+2
Tunisia	3	2	1	0	5	2	+3
Turkey	10	3	5	2	12	9	+3
Ukraine	4	2	1	1	4	3	+1
United Arab Emirates	1	0	1	0	1	1	0
United States	3	2	1	0	8	5	+3
Uruguay	2	2	0	0	8	2	+6
Wales	13	9	0	4	19	9	+10
Total	932	439	191	302	1,695	1,243	+482

== Honours ==
=== Global ===
- FIFA Confederations Cup
  - (gold) Champions (1): 1995
- Olympic Games
  - (silver) Silver medal (3): 1908, 1912, 1960
  - (bronze) Bronze medal (1): 1948

=== Intercontinental ===
- CONMEBOL–UEFA Cup of Champions
  - (silver) Runners-up (1): 1993

=== Continental ===
- UEFA European Championship
  - (gold) Champions (1): 1992

=== Regional ===
- Nordic Football Championship
  - Champions (3): 1924–28, 1978–80, 1981–85
  - Runners-up (7): 1933–36, 1937–47, 1948–51, 1960–63, 1964–67, 1968–71, 1972–77
  - Third place (4): 1929–32, 1952–55, 1956–59, 2000–01

=== Friendly ===
- Lunar New Year Cup
  - Champions (2): 1994, 2006
- King's Cup
  - Champions (1): 2010

=== Awards ===
- FIFA Fair Play Award: 2021
- World Soccer Team of the Year: 1992
- Guerin Sportivo Team of the Year: 1983
- UNESCO Fair Play Trophy: 2002

=== Summary ===
Competition	1st place, gold medalist(s)	2nd place, silver medalist(s)	3rd place, bronze medalist(s)	Total
Olympic Games	0	3	1	4
FIFA Confederations Cup	1	0	0	1
UEFA European Championship	1	0	0	1
CONMEBOL–UEFA Cup of Champions	0	1	0	1
Total	2	4	1	7

== Literature ==
- Palle "Banks" Jørgensen (2002), "Landsholdets 681 profiler fra 1908 til i dag" (in Danish), TIPS-Bladet, ISBN 87-91264-01-4.
