= Parken Stadium =

Football stadium in Copenhagen, Denmark

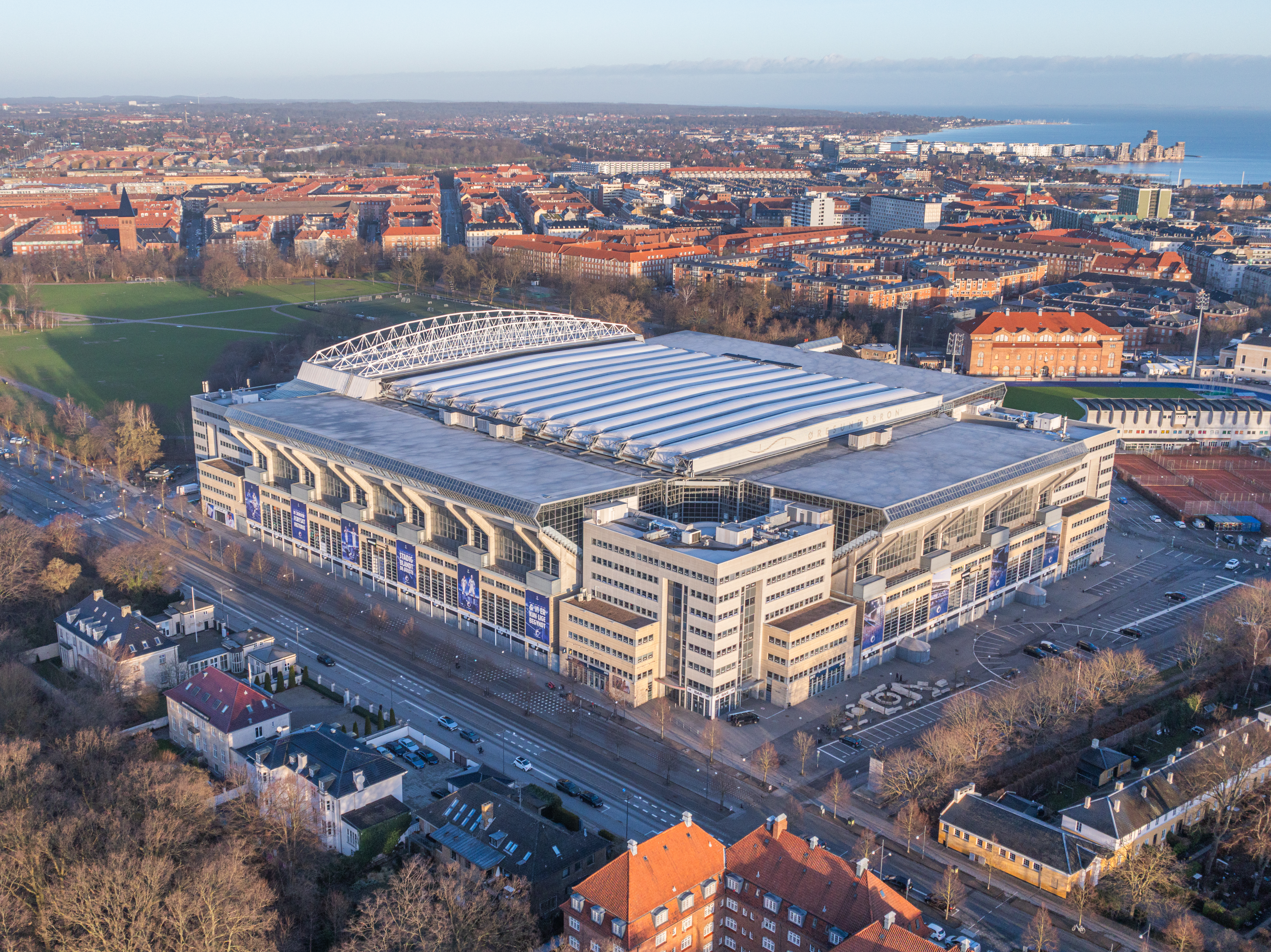
- UEFA
- Interactive map of Parken Stadium
- Former names: Telia Parken (2014–2020)
- Location: Per Henrik Lings Allé 2, DK-2100 Østerbro, Copenhagen, Denmark
- Coordinates: 55°42′09″N 12°34′20″E
- Owner: Parken Sport & Entertainment
- Operator: F.C. København & Stadion
- Capacity: 38,190 (all-seater)
- Surface: Hybrid
- Record attendance: 60,000 (Michael Jackson, HIStory World Tour, 14 August 1997)
- Field size: 105 x 68 m (114.8 x 74.3 yds)
- Public transit: at Trianglen

Construction
- Groundbreaking: 1990
- Opened: 9 September 1992
- Renovated: 2009
- Cost: DKK 640 million (€85.3 million)
- Architect: Gert Andersson

Tenants
- Denmark national football team (1992–present); F.C. Copenhagen (1992–present)

Parken is a football stadium in the Indre Østerbro (Inner Østerbro) district of Copenhagen, Denmark, built from 1990 to 1992. The stadium, which features a retractable roof, currently has a capacity of 38,190 for football games, and is the home of F.C. Copenhagen and the Denmark national football team. The stadium can hold up to 50,000 for concerts with an end-stage setup, or 55,000 with a centre-stage setup.

Parken was announced as one of 12 host venues of the UEFA Euro 2020 and it hosted three group stage matches, as well as a round of 16 match.

Geranium, a three Michelin star restaurant, is located on the eighth floor of the stadium.

== History ==
Parken was built on the site of former Denmark national stadium, Idrætsparken, from 1990 to 1992. The last national team match in Idrætsparken was a 0–2 Euro 1992 qualification loss to Yugoslavia on 14 November 1990, and on 9 September 1992, Parken was opened with a 1–2 defeat in a friendly game against Germany.

The stadium was rebuilt by investors Baltica Finans A/S in turn of the guarantee from the Danish Football Association, that all national matches would be played at Parken for 15 years. The re-construction, tore down and re-built three of the original four stands, cost 640 million Danish kroner.

In 1998, Baltica Finans sold the stadium to F.C. Copenhagen for 138 million DKK, and the club now owns both the stadium and the adjacent office buildings in the company of Parken Sport & Entertainment.

Parken was included in UEFA's list of 4-star stadiums in the autumn of 1993, making Parken eligible for hosting the finals of the Europa League (then named UEFA Cup) as well as the now defunct Cup Winners' Cup. Being a 4-star stadium, Parken can not apply for the biggest European club game, the UEFA Champions League final, as that demands 50,000 seats.

On 2 June 2007, Parken was the venue for the UEFA Euro 2008 qualifier fan attack.

On 1 May 2014 a new stadium covering Wi-Fi solution, powered by Telia was published. The deal provides free high speed Wi-Fi for all spectators at any event at the stadium. The agreement includes a 7 year long naming sponsorship, and on 17 July 2014, the stadium name was changed to Telia Parken. On 26 August 2020, it was announced that the stadium's name would be reverted to the original name, Parken, five days later on 31 August.

On 10 November 2021, the stadium entered into a long-term partnership with the telecommunications company 3, titled Parken – Connected by 3, though this did not affect the name of the stadium itself.

== Notable matches ==
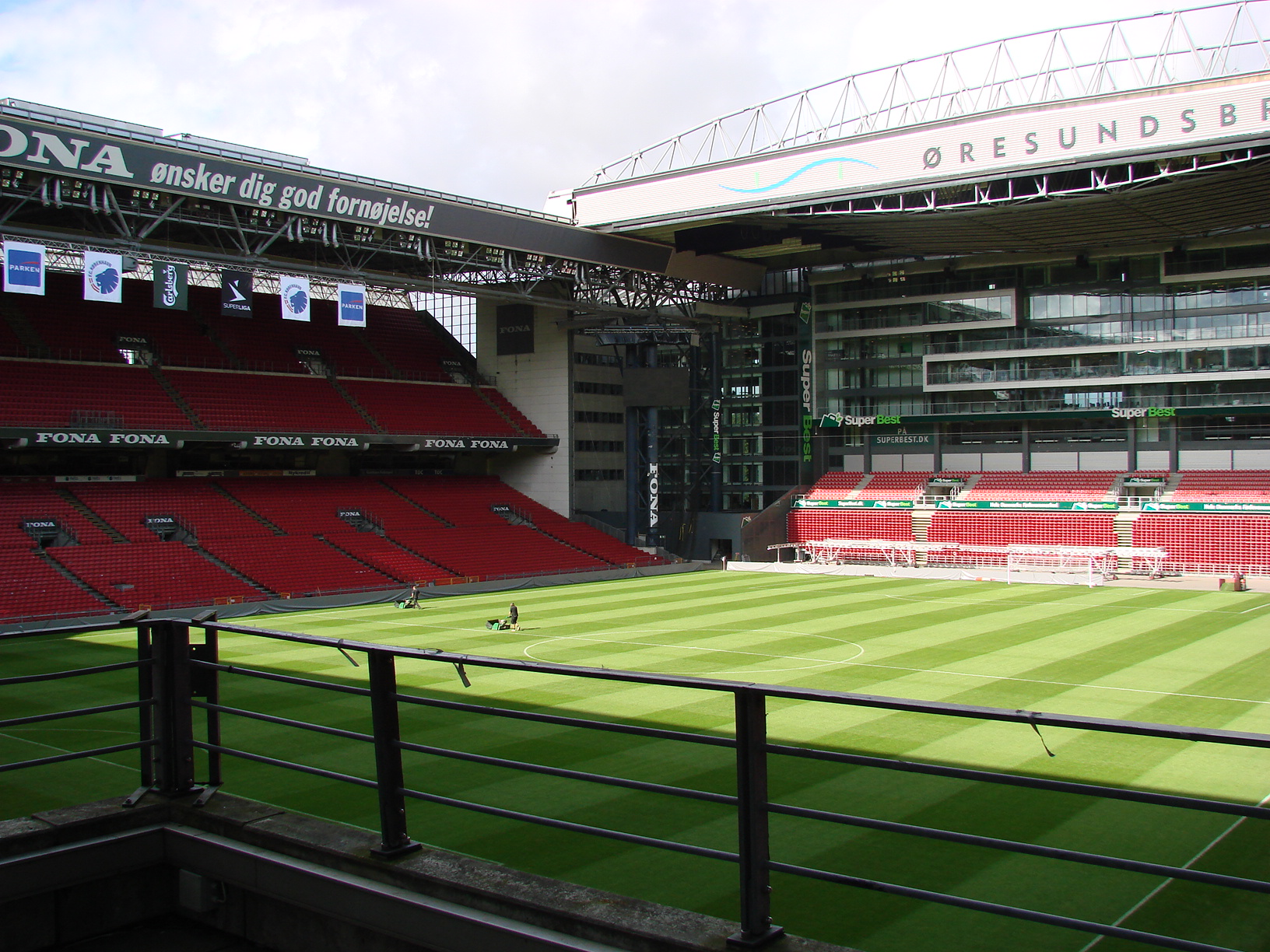
Parken field in August 2011

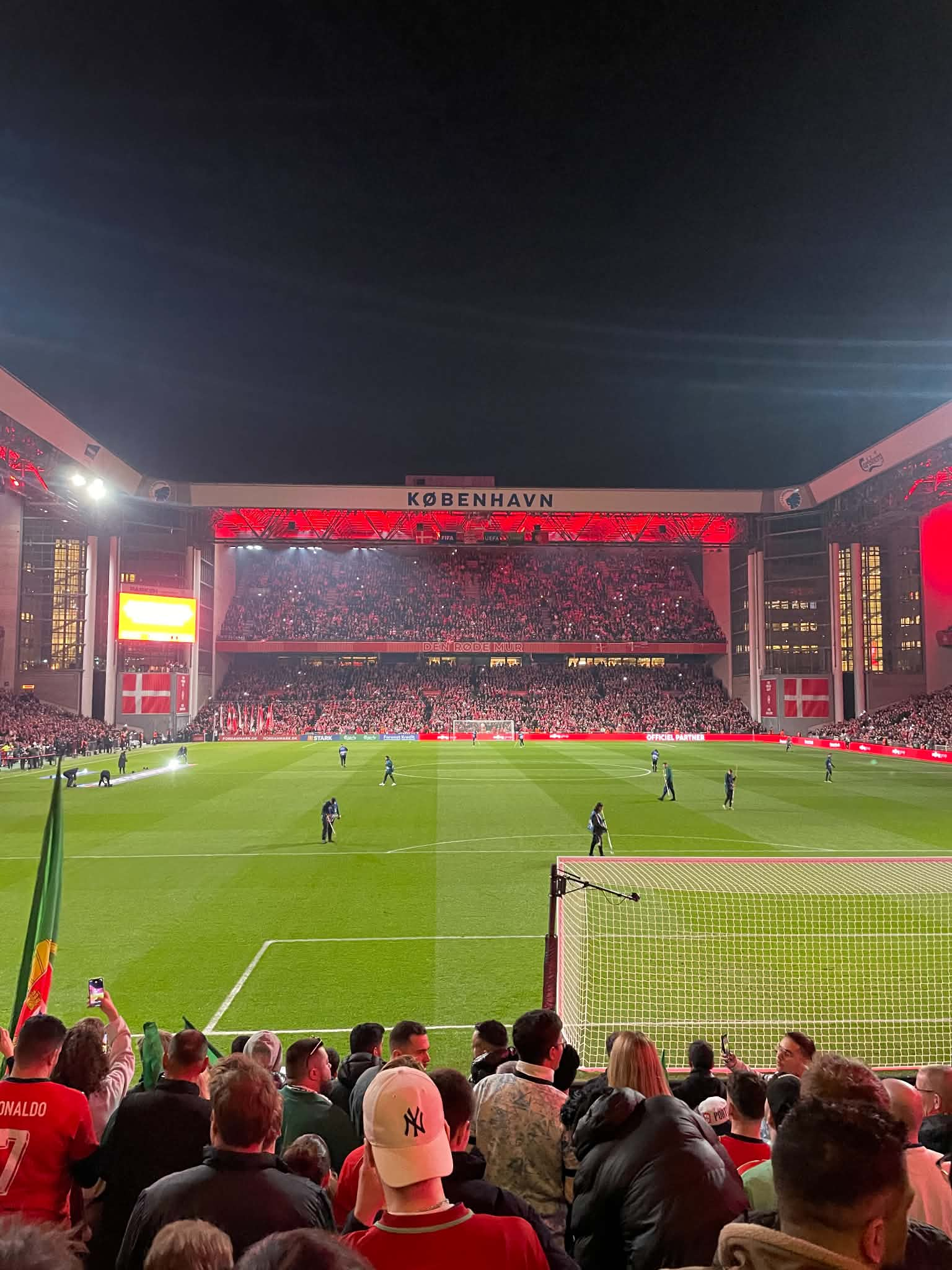
Parken during a Nations League match between Denmark and Portugal

Date	Team #1	Result	Team #2	Competition	Attendance	Remarks
9 September 1992	Denmark	1–2	Germany	Friendly match	40,500	Opening match
4 May 1994	(England) Arsenal	1–0	(Italy) Parma	1994 European Cup Winners' Cup final	33,765	
17 May 2000	(Turkey) Galatasaray	0–0 (4–1 p)	(England) Arsenal	2000 UEFA Cup final	38,919	
8 October 2005	Denmark	1–0	Greece	2006 FIFA World Cup qualifying Group 2	42,099	Stadium attendance record
6 April 2006	(Denmark) F.C. Copenhagen	1–0	(Norway) Lillestrøm	2006 Royal League final	13,617	
30 April 2006	(Denmark) F.C. Copenhagen	0–0	(Denmark) Brøndby	2005–06 Danish Superliga	41,201	League and club attendance record
2 June 2007	Denmark	0–3	Sweden	UEFA Euro 2008 qualifying Group F	42,083	Referee attacked
21 May 2011	(Denmark) AG København	30–21	(Denmark) Bjerringbro-Silkeborg	2011 Danish Handball League Final	36,651	Former world record attendance at an indoor handball match
20 April 2012	(Denmark) AG København	29–23	(Spain) FC Barcelona	2011–12 EHF Champions League quarter-finals	21,293	The highest-ever attendance at a VELUX EHF Champions League match
12 June 2021	Denmark	0–1	Finland	UEFA Euro 2020	15,000	Danish player Christian Eriksen suffered a Cardiac arrest during the 43rd minute, causing him to collapse. Eriksen was sent to the nearby Rigshospitalet where he recovered.

=== Euro 2020 ===
Parken is one of the stadiums that hosted matches for the UEFA Euro 2020. Three Group B matches and a Round of 16 were played there.

Date	Team #1	Result	Team #2	Round	Attendance
12 June 2021	Denmark	0–1	Finland	Group B	15,200
17 June 2021	Denmark	1–2	Belgium	Group B	23,395
21 June 2021	Russia	1–4	Denmark	Group B	23,644
28 June 2021	Croatia	3–5 (a.e.t.)	Spain	Round of 16	22,771

== Concert venue ==
Also used as a concert venue, Parken hosted the Eurovision Song Contest 2001. In preparation for hosting Eurovision, and to make Parken a more useful venue in general, a retractable roof was applied to the existing structure in 2000 and 2001.

Musicians such as AC/DC, Beyoncé, Justin Bieber, The Black Eyed Peas, Bon Jovi, David Bowie, Eric Clapton, Coldplay, Depeche Mode, Celine Dion, Guns N' Roses, Whitney Houston, Michael Jackson, Jay-Z, Elton John, Kashmir, Lady Gaga, Madonna, Paul McCartney, Metallica, Mew, George Michael, Muse, One Direction, Pet Shop Boys, Pharrell, Pink, Pink Floyd, Red Hot Chili Peppers, R.E.M., The Rolling Stones, Britney Spears, Bruce Springsteen, Take That, Tiësto, Tina Turner, U2, Roger Waters, and Robbie Williams have performed at Parken. In 2017, Volbeat became the first Danish band to sell out the venue; their Let's Boogie DVD is of this concert.

The biggest concert ever held in Parken was a performance by Michael Jackson on 14 August 1997, during his HIStory tour, with 60,000 tickets sold; a second show was held on the 29th, in which Jackson was thrown a surprise birthday party after the performance of "You Are Not Alone".

== See also ==
- Speedway Grand Prix of Denmark
- List of football stadiums in Denmark
- Lists of stadiums

Preceded by Globe Arena; Stockholm	Eurovision Song Contest; Venue; 2001	Succeeded by Saku Suurhall Arena; Tallinn
