= 2005–06 F.C. Copenhagen season =

F.C. Copenhagen
2005–06 season
- Chairman: Flemming Østergaard
- Manager: Hans Backe (2005); Ståle Solbakken (2006)
- Danish Superliga: 1st
- Danish Cup: Quarter-finals
- UEFA Cup: First round
- Royal League: Winner
- Top goalscorer: League: Álvaro Santos (15); All: Álvaro Santos (18)
- Highest home attendance: 41,201 (vs Brøndby IF, 30 April 2006)
- Lowest home attendance: 5,432 (vs Kalmar FF, 16 February 2006)

FCK won the Danish Superliga trophy in the season 2005-06. The championship was secured on May 7 after a 0–1 defeat at Fionia Park against Odense BK, but with simultaneously, AC Horsens winning 4–1 over Brøndby IF.

They won on April 6 the Royal League again, after an exciting final against Lillestrøm S.K., where Razak Pimpong scored the decisive goal in the final seconds.

FCK were knocked out of the UEFA Cup by Hamburger SV on September 29 after a very controversial refereeing performance by British Matthew Messias, giving eight yellow cards, two of those leading to a sending off, and a third direct red card, all in the last ten minutes, and giving HSV a 92nd-minute penalty kick.

== Competitions ==
This season F.C. Copenhagen played in the Danish Superliga, Danish Cup, UEFA Cup and Royal League.

=== Danish Superliga ===
In the Superliga they were at the winter break placed first, with only one defeat and four draws after 20 matches. Their biggest win was a 5–1 win against Esbjerg fB at Parken on September 25, where Elrio van Heerden and Marcus Allbäck scored both twice, while the fifth goal was scored by Peter Møller.

At October 26 FCK visited Haderslev Fodboldstadion, where SønderjyskE was the home team. After SønderjyskE opened the match with a Henrik Hansen-goal, Álvaro Santos made it 1–1 with a beautiful scissors kick, which later was awarded as goal of the year. Elrio van Heerden scored to 2–1, Peter Møller to 3–1 and Álvaro made his second goal in the extra time.

The only autumn defeat was against Esbjerg fB on November 5, 2005, where they lost 3–1 at Esbjerg Idrætspark.

On March 12, 2006 they got their second defeat. This time was it the arch rivals Brøndby IF who beat FCK. That match ended 3-0 at Brøndby Stadium.

The championship was secured on May 7 after a 0–1 defeat at Fionia Park against Odense BK, but with simultaneously, AC Horsens winning 4–1 over Brøndby IF.

In the last match on May 14, FCK lost again, this time to Silkeborg IF home at Parken, 2–3 in a very even match. Michael Silberbauer and Brede Hangeland were the goalscorers for F.C. Copenhagen.

=== Danish Cup ===
In the Cup, FCK started in 5th round, where they met the 2nd Division East team Slagelse BI. After 2–2 at full-time and extra time, the match was decided on penalties. Here, FCK won 4–3, and went through to the quarter finals.

In the quarter-finals, the opponents were the arch rivals Brøndby IF at Brøndby Stadium, where Brøndby won 1-0 after extra time and two red cards to FCK in the second half.

=== UEFA Cup ===
In the UEFA Cup they started in the 2nd Qualifying Round where they beat Carmarthen Town from Wales with 4–0 agg.

In the 1st round they played against German Hamburger SV. The first leg was played in the AOL Arena in Hamburg and ended 1–1. Hamburger SV won the second leg in Parken 1–0 to eliminate F.C. Copenhagen and got through to the group stage.

=== Royal League ===
In the group stage F.C. Copenhagen were in group 2 with the archrivals Brøndby IF, Swedish Kalmar FF and Norwegian Lillestrøm S.K. in the group 2. FCK won only one match, but with four draws, FCK qualified for the quarter finals, where they met Hammarby IF.

The game would be special for FCK captain Tobias Linderoth, as Hammarby's coach, Anders Linderoth, is his father. In the same matches, both teams were playing in Kappa shirts, and for the draw, the two captains, Tobias Linderoth (Swede, FCK) and Mikkel Jensen (Dane, Hammarby), were dressed in almost identical cardigans. The only difference was the team names.

After a 2–0 victory home at Parken, FCK could spot the semi finals in the horizont, but with two Hammarby goals in the last 5 minutes. Then a penalty shootout should decide their Royal League future, but with 3 FCK goals, and 3 Jesper Christiansen saves, they won the shootout 3–0.

In the semi-finals, FCK drew the other remaining Danish team, FC Midtjylland. Home FCK won 3-1 and away, at SAS Arena, they beat FCM 4–0.

F.C. Copenhagen won in the 2005-06 Royal League season, after an exciting final against Lillestrøm S.K., played at Parken. FCK won 1–0 after an 89th minute Razak Pimpong-goal. Pimpong had substituted Ijeh in the 69th minute, and he got his second yellow card in his enthusiasm after the goal, where he took off his shirt.

== Squads ==
The following squads, are lists with all the players, who have played in F.C. Copenhagen in the 2005–06 season.

=== First team squad ===
Note: Flags indicate national team as defined under FIFA eligibility rules; some limited exceptions apply. Players may hold more than one non-FIFA nationality.

No.	Pos.	Nation	Player
1	GK	DEN	Jesper Christiansen
2	DF	DEN	Lars Jacobsen
3	DF	EST	Urmas Rooba
4	DF	DEN	Bo Svensson (sold to M'gladbach)
5	DF	NOR	Brede Hangeland (bought from Viking)
5	DF	FIN	Janne Saarinen (sold to FC Honka)
6	MF	SWE	Tobias Linderoth (captain)
7	FW	BRA	Álvaro Santos
8	MF	DEN	Michael Silberbauer
9	FW	NGA	Peter Ijeh
11	FW	SWE	Marcus Allbäck
12	MF	DEN	Thomas Røll
13	MF	CAN	Atiba Hutchinson (bought from Helsingborg)
14	DF	DEN	Michael Gravgaard
15	DF	NOR	André Bergdølmo

No.	Pos.	Nation	Player
16	DF	DEN	Dan Thomassen
17	DF	DEN	Ole Tobiasen (sold to Sandefjord)
18	MF	DEN	Carsten Fredgaard (sold to Randers)
20	MF	GHA	Razak Pimpong (bought from FCM)
21	GK	HUN	Balázs Rabóczki (sold to FC Sopron)
22	MF	DEN	Morten Bertolt
23	MF	DEN	William Kvist
24	FW	DEN	Jeppe Brandrup
26	MF	RSA	Elrio van Heerden (sold to Brugge)
27	FW	DEN	Martin Bernburg
28	MF	DEN	Martin Bergvold
31	GK	DEN	Benny Gall
32	FW	DEN	Peter Møller (stopped career)

=== Second team squad ===
Note: Flags indicate national team as defined under FIFA eligibility rules; some limited exceptions apply. Players may hold more than one non-FIFA nationality.

No.	Pos.	Nation	Player
1	GK	DEN	Thomas Villadsen
2	DF	DEN	Jeppe Hestehave
3	MF	DEN	Mathias Gravesen
4	DF	DEN	Nikolaj Steen Hansen
5	DF	DEN	Jamil Fearrington
6	MF	DEN	Christian Lønstrup (stopped career)
7	MF	DEN	Álvaro Diaz
9	MF	DEN	Claus Nielsen
10	FW	DEN	Mads Torry

No.	Pos.	Nation	Player
11	FW	DEN	Lasse Quist
12	FW	DEN	Dragan Todorocic
14	MF	DEN	Stefan Monberg
15	DF	DEN	Jonas Schumacher
16	FW	DEN	Kasper Sørensen
20	GK	RSA	Lee Langeveldt
––	DF	DEN	Nicklas Svendsen
––	GK	DEN	John Lundbye (sold)
––	DF	DEN	Peter Piil (sold)
––	MF	DEN	Thomas Dominos (sold)

== Transfers ==
=== Players In ===
No.	Player	From	Comments
15	André Bergdølmo	Dortmund	
18	Carsten Fredgaard	Randers	End of loan
24	Jeppe Brandrup		Youth player - now first team player
1	Jesper Christiansen	Viborg	
11	Marcus Allbäck	Hansa Rostock	
27	Martin Bernburg		Youth player - now first team player
14	Michael Gravgaard	Viborg	
9	Peter Ijeh	Gothenburg	
12	Thomas Røll	Silkeborg	End of loan
20	Razak Pimpong	Midtjylland	
5	Brede Hangeland	Viking	
13	Atiba Hutchinson	Helsingborg	

=== Players out ===
No.	Player	To	Comments
24	Christian Traoré	Midtjylland	
25	Hjalte Nørregaard	Heerenveen	
27	Jesper Bech	Malmö	
9	Magne Hoseth	Vålerenga	
1	Magnus Kihlstedt		Stopped career
17	Ole Tobiasen	AaB	On loan
15	Peter Christiansen	Helsingborg	
10	Sibusiso Zuma	Bielefeld	
12	Todi Jónsson	Start	
17	Ole Tobiasen	Sandefjord	
18	Carsten Fredgaard	Randers	
32	Peter Møller		Stopped career
21	Balázs Rabóczki	Sopron	
5	Janne Saarinen	Honka	
26	Elrio van Heerden	Brugge	
4	Bo Svensson	M'gladbach	

== Competition statistics ==
=== Danish Superliga ===
==== Classification ====
Pos	Team	Pld	W	D	L	GF	GA	GD	Pts	Qualification or relegation
1	Copenhagen (C)	33	22	7	4	62	27	+35	73	Qualification to Champions League second qualifying round and Royal League
2	Brøndby	33	21	4	8	60	32	+28	67	Qualification to UEFA Cup first qualifying round and Royal League
3	OB	33	17	7	9	49	28	+21	58	Qualification to Intertoto Cup second round and Royal League
4	Viborg FF	33	15	9	9	62	43	+19	54	Qualification to Royal League
5	AaB	33	11	12	10	48	44	+4	45	

Rules for classification: 1) points; 2) goal difference; 3) number of goals scored.
(C) Champions

==== Results summary ====
Overall								Home						Away					
Pld	W	D	L	GF	GA	GD	Pts	W	D	L	GF	GA	GD	W	D	L	GF	GA	GD
33	22	7	4	62	27	+35	73	11	5	1	35	15	+20	11	2	3	27	12	+15

Last updated: 14 May.
Source: danskfodbold.com

== Results ==
Results for F.C. Copenhagen for season 2005-2006.

NOTE: scores are written FCK first

Date	Venue	Opponents	Score	Comp	FCK scorers	Match Report*
July 7, 2005	Ødsted Stadion, Ødsted	Ammitsbøl/Jerlev	13-1	F	Fredgaard (2), Allbäck, Santos (4), Bergvold, Thomassen, Saarinen, Møller (2), Røll	FCK
July 10, 2005	Ødsted Stadion, Ødsted	BPI/FC Fredericia	6-1	F	Ijeh, Saarinen (3), Santos (2)	FCK
July 16, 2005	Helsingør Stadion, Elsinore	Rennes	1-0	F	Allbäck	FCK
July 20, 2005	Aalborg Stadion Aalborg	AaB	1-0	DSL	Santos	FCK
July 24, 2005	Parken, Copenhagen	AC Horsens	2-0	DSL	Jacobsen, Santos	FCK
July 31, 2005	Farum Park, Farum	FC Nordsjælland	2-1	DSL	Santos, Allbäck	FCK
August 7, 2005	Parken, Copenhagen	AGF	1-1	DSL	Ijeh	FCK
August 11, 2005	Parken, Copenhagen	Carmarthen	2-0	UCQ	Santos, Gravgaard	FCK
August 14, 2005	Haderslev Fodboldstadion, Haderslev	SønderjyskE	1-0	DSL	Bergdølmo	FCK
August 21, 2005	Viborg Stadion, Viborg	Viborg	2-1	DSL	Jacobsen, Ijeh	FCK
August 25, 2005	Ninian Park, Cardiff, Wales	Carmarthen	2-0	UCQ	Møller (2)	FCK
August 28, 2005	Parken, Copenhagen	Silkeborg	2-0	DSL	Jacobsen, Gravgaard	FCK
September 11, 2005	Fionia Park, Odense	OB	2-0	DSL	Allbäck (2)	FCK
September 15, 2005	AOL Arena, Hamburg, Germany	Hamburg	1-1	UC1	van Heerden	FCK, UEFA
September 18, 2005	Parken, Copenhagen	FC Midtjylland	3-1	DSL	Santos (2), Møller	FCK
September 21, 2005	Brøndby Stadion, Brøndby	Brøndby	1-1	DSL	van Heerden	FCK
September 25, 2005	Parken, Copenhagen	Esbjerg	5-1	DSL	van Heerden (2), Møller, Allbäck (2)	FCK
September 29, 2005	Parken, Copenhagen	Hamburg	0-1	UC1		FCK
October 2, 2005	Parken, Copenhagen	OB	1-1	DSL	Santos	FCK
October 16, 2005	Silkeborg Stadion, Silkeborg	Silkeborg	3-0	DSL	Allbäck, Santos, Møller	FCK
October 19, 2005	Slagelse Stadion, Slagelse	Slagelse	5-6 (pen)	DC5	Santos, Gravgaard	FCK
October 22, 2005	Parken, Copenhagen	AC Horsens	1-0	DSL	Møller	FCK
October 26, 2005	Haderslev Fodboldstadion, Haderslev	SønderjyskE	4-1	DSL	Santos (2), van Heerden, Møller	FCK
October 30, 2005	Parken, Copenhagen	FC Midtjylland	2-0	DSL	Møller (2)	FCK
November 5, 2005	Esbjerg Idrætspark, Esbjerg	Esbjerg	1-3	DSL	Gravgaard	FCK
November 20, 2005	Parken, Copenhagen	AGF	1-1	DSL	Santos	FCK
November 24, 2005	Åråsen Stadion, Oslo, Norway	Lillestrøm	0-0	RLB		FCK, Royal League
November 27, 2005	Aalborg Stadion, Aalborg	AaB	2-0	DSL	Bergdølmo, Allbäck	FCK
December 4, 2005	Parken, Copenhagen	Viborg	3-1	DSL	Santos (2), Allbäck	FCK
December 8, 2005	Parken, Copenhagen	Brøndby	1-1	RLB	Bergdølmo	FCK, Royal League
December 11, 2005	Fredrikskans Idrottspark, Kalmar, Sweden	Kalmar	0-1	RLB		FCK, Royal League
January 22, 2006	Parken, Copenhagen	Schalke 04	0-0	F		FCK
January 30, 2006	La Manga del Mar Menor, Murcia, Spain	Lokomotiv Moscow	2-1	LMC	Allbäck, Bernburg	FCK
February 3, 2006	La Manga del Mar Menor, Murcia, Spain	Salzburg	0-0	LMC		FCK
February 6, 2006	La Manga del Mar Menor, Murcia, Spain	Rosenborg	1-2	LMC	Bertolt	FCK
February 9, 2006	Brøndby Stadion, Brøndby	Brøndby	2-1	RLB	Allbäck, Bergvold	FCK, Royal League
February 12, 2006	Parken, Copenhagen	Lillestrøm	1-1	RLB	Linderoth	FCK, Royal League
February 16, 2006	Parken, Copenhagen	Kalmar	1-1	RLB	Hutchinson	FCK, Royal League
February 23, 2006	Parken, Copenhagen	Hammarby	2-0	RL4	Santos, Allbäck	FCK, Royal League
March 5, 2006	Brøndby Stadion, Brøndby	Brøndby	0-1	DC6		FCK
March 9, 2006	Söderstadion, Stockholm	Hammarby	3-2 (pen)	RL4		FCK, Royal League
March 12, 2006	Brøndby Stadion, Brøndby	Brøndby	0-3	DSL		FCK
March 16, 2006	Parken, Copenhagen	Midtjylland	3-1	RLS	Silberbauer, Ijeh, Hangeland	FCK, Royal League
March 19, 2006	Parken, Copenhagen	FC Nordsjælland	3-3	DSL	Ijeh, Bergvold, Allbäck	FCK
March 23, 2006	SAS Arena, Herning	Midtjylland	4-0	RLS	Ijeh (2x), Silberbauer, Kvist	FCK, Royal League
March 29, 2006	Parken, Copenhagen	AaB	1-0	DSL	Linderoth	FCK
April 1, 2006	Atletion, Århus	AGF	4-0	DSL	Allbäck(2x), Hutchinson, Hansen (AGF) (og)	FCK
April 6, 2006	Parken, Copenhagen	Lillestrøm	1-0	RLF	Pimpong	FCK, Royal League
April 9, 2006	Parken, Copenhagen	Esbjerg	2-1	DSL	Allbäck, Bergvold	FCK
April 13, 2006	SAS Arena, Herning	FC Midtjylland	3-1	DSL	Allbäck, Santos(2x)	FCK
April 17, 2006	Parken, Copenhagen	SønderjyskE	4-1	DSL	Allbäck, Silberbauer, Stolberg (SE) (og), Santos	FCK
April 23, 2006	Forum Horsens Stadion, Horsens	AC Horsens	1-0	DSL	Ijeh	FCK
April 26, 2006	Farum Park, Farum	FC Nordsjælland	1-1	DSL	Silberbauer	FCK
April 30, 2006	Parken, Copenhagen	Brøndby	0-0	DSL		FCK
May 4, 2006	Viborg Stadion, Viborg	Viborg	1-0	DSL	Allbäck	FCK
May 7, 2006	Fionia Park, Odense	OB	0-1	DSL		FCK
May 14, 2006	Parken, Copenhagen	Silkeborg	2-3	DSL	Silberbauer, Hangeland	FCK
May 18, 2006	Forum Horsens Stadion, Horsens	Horsens	4-1	VCD	Kvist, Bernburg (2x), Hangeland	FCK
May 21, 2006	Parken, Copenhagen	Midtjylland	2-2	VCD	Qvist, Hutchinson	FCK
May 26, 2006	Farum Park, Farum	Nordsjælland	1-3	VC4	Bertolt	FCK
May 29, 2006	Parken, Copenhagen	Nordsjælland	1-3	VC4	Bernburg	FCK

Key:

- DSL = Danish Superliga
- DC = Danish Cup
- UCQ = UEFA Cup Qualifier
- UC1 = UEFA Cup round 1
- RLB = Royal League Group B
- RL4 = Royal League Quarter-finals
- RLS = Royal League Semi-finals
- RLF = Royal League Final
- VCD = Viasat Cup Group D
- VC4 = Viasat Cup Quarter-finals
- LMC = La Manga Cup
- F = Friendly match

=== Report explanation ===
- FCK in Danish
- UEFA in English
- Royal League in:
  - Lillestrøm 0-0 FCK: Norwegian
  - FCK 1-1 Brøndby: Danish
  - Kalmar 1-0 FCK: Swedish
  - Brøndby 1-2 FCK: Danish
  - FCK 1-1 Lillestrøm: Danish
  - FCK 1-1 Kalmar: Danish
  - FCK 2-0 Hammarby: Danish
  - Hammarby 2-3 FCK: Swedish
  - FCK 3-1 Midtjylland: Danish
  - Midtjylland 0-4 FCK: Danish
  - FCK 1-0 Lillestrøm: Danish

== Season statistics ==
=== Top goalscorers ===
Álvaro Santos	24
Marcus Allbäck	20
Peter Møller	11
Peter Ijeh	8
Michael Silberbauer	5
Elrio van Heerden	5

=== Attendances ===
Spectators on home ground 2005-06

- 366,369 spectators in 17 Superliga matches
- Average: 21,551

Best visited FCK home match 2005-06

- 41,201 spectators against Brøndby IF on 30 April 2006

Worst visited FCK home match 2005-06

- 15,025 spectators against AC Horsens on 22 November 2005

== Honours ==
- The Autumn Profile (2005): Michael Gravgaard
- Profile of the year in the Superliga (2005): Michael Gravgaard
- Goal of the year (2005): Álvaro Santos (against SønderjyskE on 2005-10-26)
- The Golden Goalie (2005): Jesper Christiansen
- The Spring Profile (2006): Tobias Linderoth
- The Spring Manager (2006): Ståle Solbakken
- Player of the Spring (2006): Marcus Allbäck
- Team of the Year (2005): Jesper Christiansen, Lars Jacobsen and Michael Gravgaard

== See also ==
- 2005–06 Danish Superliga
- 2005–06 UEFA Cup
- 2005–06 Royal League
- Viasat Cup
