= 2005–06 in Danish football =

Football in Denmark
- Season: 2005–06

The 2005-06 season in Danish football, starting July 2005 and ending June 2006:

== Events ==
- 13 July 2005: Brøndby IF won the League Cup at Brøndby Stadion. FC København ended second, and FC Midtjylland third.
- 19 July 2005: The Superliga kicks off.
- 28 July 2005: Esbjerg fB (who qualified by fair play) beats Estonian FC Flora Tallinn 7-2 agg. in the first qualifying round in the UEFA Cup.
- 30 July 2005: The 1st Division kicks off.
- 3 August 2005: Brøndby IF beats Georgian FC Dinamo Tbilisi 5-1 agg. in the second qualifying round in the UEFA Champions League.
- 5 August 2005: The 2nd Division West kicks off.
- 6 August 2005: The 2nd Division East kicks off.
- 24 August 2005: Brøndby IF are beaten by Dutch AFC Ajax 3–5 agg. in the third qualifying round in the UEFA Champions League.
- 25 August 2005: FC København beats Welch Carmarthen Town F.C. 4-0 agg., FC Midtjylland beats Faorese B36 Tórshavn 4-3 agg. and Esbjerg fB are beaten by Norwegian Tromsø IL 1-1 (2–3p.) All this in the UEFA Cup's second qualifying round.
- 3 September 2005: The Danish national team can't reach the first place in their qualification group. Ukraine have clinched it. Now their target is the second place.
- 29 September 2005: Brøndby IF beats Swiss FC Zürich 3-2 agg., FC København are beaten by German Hamburger SV 1–2 agg. (after a very controversial refereeing performance by British Matthew Messias, giving eight yellow cards, two of those leading to a sending off, and a third direct red card, all in the last ten minutes, and giving HSV a 92nd-minute penalty kick, later called "a joke" in German press – had HSV not scored, FCK would have proceeded to the group phase) and FC Midtjylland are beaten by the holding UEFA Cup-champions, Russian CSKA Moscow. All this in the UEFA Cup first round.
- 12 October 2005: The Danish national team is now definitely out of the FIFA World Cup 2006, since Turkey beat Albania.
- 27 October 2005: The Danish Football Association no longer searches for a friendly match in November, since Ireland cancelled.
- 10 November 2005: Royal League kicks off.
- 7 December 2005: Yearly awards by the players association:
  - 2005 Danish Superliga profile: Michael Gravgaard, FC København
  - 2005 Danish 1st Division profile: Henrik Toft, Vejle Boldklub
  - 2005 Danish 2nd Division West profile: Rene Svendsen, Hobro IK
  - 2005 Danish 2nd Division East profile: Gilberto Macena, Holbæk B&I
  - 2005 team of the year: Jesper Christiansen (FCK), Michael Gravgaard (FCK), Daniel Agger (BIF), Lars Jacobsen (FCK), Allan K. Jepsen (AaB), Thomas Kahlenberg (Auxerre), Christian Poulsen (Schalke 04), Martin Retov (BIF), Søren Larsen (FC Schalke 04), Jon Dahl Tomasson (Stuttgart), Morten Rasmussen (AGF).
  - 2005 talent of the year: Daniel Agger, Brøndby IF
- 15 December 2005: Brøndby IF played the last game in their UEFA Cup group B against Palermo. After only 1 victory (against M. Petach-Tikva) and 1 draw (against Espanyol) in four games, Brøndby ended 4th in the group.
- 28 December 2005: Yearly awards by Sports Confederation of Denmark:
  - 2005 Danish footballer of the year: Christian Poulsen, FC Schalke 04
  - 2005 best goal in the Superliga: Álvaro Santos, FC København against SønderjyskE on 28 October
- 2 January 2006: 2005 Goalie of the year: Jesper Christiansen, FC København
- 1 February 2006: The Danish league national team won the Hong Kong-tournament Carlsberg Cup, after winning 3–1 against South Korea.
- 13 February 2006: FC Midtjylland qualified for the quarter-finals in Royal League with 3 victories (against Vålerenga, Hammarby and Vålerenga) and 2 draws (against Start and Hammarby).
- 16 February 2006: Brøndby IF, FC København, FC Midtjylland and AaB played the last games in their Royal League groups. Brøndby's was against Lillestrøm. After only 1 victory (against Kalmar) and 3 draws (against Kalmar, FCK and Lillestrøm) in six games, Brøndby ended 3rd in the group, but they didn't qualify for the quarter-finals. FCK's last game was against Kalmar. FCK had also only won 1 game (against Brøndby), but with 4 draws (against Lillestrøm, Brøndby, Lillestrøm and Kalmar), they ended 2nd in the group and qualified for the quarter-finals. AaB's match was against Gothenburg. AaB had, just like Brøndby, won only 1 match (against Lyn) and played 3 draws (against Gothenburg, Lyn and Gothenburg). They ended last in the group and neither qualified for the quarter-finals. Midtjylland's last match was a 1–1 draw against Start.
- 9 March 2006: FC København and FC Midtjylland played their last quarter finals in Royal League. The match ended with a 4–0 win to FCK, and they went through to the final – 7–1 on agg.
- 6 April 2006: FC København won the 2006 Royal League Final 1–0 against Lillestrøm at Parken Stadium.
- 29 April 2006: Aarhus GF relegated from the Superliga
- 4 May 2006: SønderjyskE relegated from the Superliga
- 7 May 2006: FC København won the Danish Superliga 2005-06.
- 11 May 2006: Randers FC won the Danish Cup 2005-06 after a 1–0 win against Esbjerg fB in the final at Parken Stadium.
- 14 May 2006: Last round in the Superliga.
- 14 May 2006: Brønshøj BK relegated from the 1st Division.
- 14 May 2006: BK Avarta relegated from the 2nd Division East.
- 27 May 2006: BK Skjold relegated from the 1st Division.
- 5 June 2006: Last round in the 2nd Divisions were played.
- 5 June 2006: Esbjerg 2 won the Danish 2nd Division West 2005-06.
- 5 June 2006: Næstved BK won the Danish 2nd Division East 2005-06.
- 5 June 2006: Aarhus Fremad promoted to the Danish 1st Division.
- 5 June 2006: Værløse BK relegated from the 2nd Division East-
- 5 June 2006: Kalundborg GB and Boldklubben 1909 relegated from the 2nd Division West.
- 10 June 2006: First playoff match, between the runners-up in the 2nd Divisions, Holbæk B&I and Thisted FC were played. Thisted won 3–0.
- 11 June 2006: Vejle BK won the Danish 1st Division 2005-06.
- 17 June 2006: Thisted FC promoted to the Danish 1st Division, in spite of losing the second playoff match against Holbæk B&I 0–2.
- 18 June 2006: Last round in the 1st Division.

== National team results ==
Date	Venue	Opponents	Score*	Competition	Denmark scorers	Report
August 17, 2005	Parken Stadium, Copenhagen (H)	England	4-1	F	Dennis Rommedahl, Jon Dahl Tomasson, Michael Gravgaard, Søren Larsen	BBC
September 3, 2005	Inönü Stadium, Istanbul (A)	Turkey	2-2	WCQ2	Claus Jensen, Søren Larsen	UEFA
September 7, 2005	Parken Stadium, Copenhagen (H)	Georgia	6-1	WCQ2	Claus Jensen, Christian Poulsen, Daniel Agger, Jon Dahl Tomasson, Søren Larsen(2x)	UEFA
October 8, 2005	Parken Stadium, Copenhagen (H)	Greece	1-0	WCQ2	Michael Gravgaard	UEFA
October 12, 2005	Almaty Central Stadium, Almaty (A)	Kazakhstan	2-1	WCQ2	Michael Gravgaard, Jon Dahl Tomasson	UEFA
January 26, 2006	National Stadium, Singapore (A)	Singapore	2-1	LT F	Jesper Bech(2x)	
January 29, 2006	Hong Kong Stadium, Hong Kong (A)	Hong Kong	3-0	LT CC	Søren Berg, Thomas Augustinussen, Anders Due	UEFA
February 1, 2006	Hong Kong Stadium, Hong Kong (N)	South Korea	3-1	LT CC Final	Lars Jacobsen, Jesper Bech, Michael Silberbauer	
March 1, 2006	Ramat Gan Stadium, Ramat Gan (A)	Israel	2-0	F	Kenneth Perez, Morten Skoubo	UEFA
May 27, 2006	NRGi Park, Århus (H)	Paraguay	1-1	F	Jon Dahl Tomasson	UEFA
May 31, 2006	Stade Félix Bollaert, Lens (A)	France	0-2	F		UEFA

* Denmark scores first

Key

- H = Home match
- A = Away match
- N = Neutral site match
- LT = League team (non-official)
- F = Friendly
- WCQ2 = FIFA World Cup 2006 Qualifying, European Zone Group 2
- CC = Carlsberg Cup

== Honours ==
Competition	Winner	Additional information
SAS Ligaen	FC København	SønderjyskE and Aarhus GF relegated.
National Cup	Randers FC	See also Danish Cup 2005-06
Tele2 League Cup	Brøndby IF	FC København ended second and FC Midtjylland third.
Viasat Sport Divisionen	Vejle BK	Vejle BK promoted; BK Skjold and Brønshøj BK relegated.
2nd Division East	Næstved BK	Næstved BK promoted; Værløse BK and BK Avarta relegated.
2nd Division West	Esbjerg 2	Aarhus Fremad and Thisted FC promoted; Kalundborg GB and B 1909 relegated.

== See also ==
- 2005–06 Danish Superliga season
- 2005–06 Danish 1st Division season
- 2005–06 Danish 2nd Divisions - East/West
- 2005–06 Danish Cup season
