= Tobias Linderoth =

Swedish footballer (born 1979)

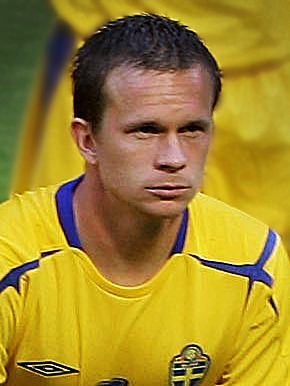
- Linderoth with Sweden during the 2006 FIFA World Cup

Personal information
- Full name: Tobias Jan Håkan Linderoth
- Date of birth: 21 April 1979 (age 47)
- Place of birth: Marseille, France
- Height: 1.77 m (5 ft 10 in)
- Position: Defensive midfielder

Team information
- Current team: Norrby IF (manager)

Youth career
- 1985–1992: MAIF
- 1992–1995: IFK Hässleholm
- 1995–1996: Feyenoord

Senior career*
| Years | Team | Apps | (Gls) |
| 1995 | IFK Hässleholm | 7 | (0) |
| 1996–1998 | IF Elfsborg | 57 | (4) |
| 1998–2001 | Stabæk | 68 | (9) |
| 2001–2004 | Everton | 40 | (0) |
| 2004–2007 | Copenhagen | 82 | (4) |
| 2007–2010 | Galatasaray | 13 | (0) |
| Total | | 267 | (17) |

International career
| 1994–1995 | Sweden U17 | 15 | (1) |
| 1997–1998 | Sweden U19 | 11 | (0) |
| 1998–2001 | Sweden U21 | 22 | (0) |
| 1999–2008 | Sweden | 76 | (2) |

Managerial career
- 2021–2023: Skövde AIK
- 2024: Varbergs BoIS
- 2025–: Norrby IF
- * Club domestic league appearances and goals

Tobias Jan Håkan Linderoth (Swedish pronunciation: [tʊˈbǐːas ˈlɪ̂nːdɛˌruːt]; born 21 April 1979) is a professional football manager and former player, who is the current manager of Swedish club Norrby IF. He played as a midfielder, and played professionally in Sweden, Norway, England, Denmark, and Turkey before injuries forced him to retire in 2010. Born in France, he won 76 caps for the Sweden national team and represented them at two FIFA World Cups (2002 and 2006) and two UEFA European Championships (2004 and 2008).

== Club career ==
Linderoth played for Stabæk and then an unremarkable spell at Everton marred by injury, where he scored once against Charlton Athletic in the League Cup, before he joined Copenhagen in the summer of 2004. He was a regular first team player for three seasons in Copenhagen and was made captain for the team that won two Danish championships and qualified for the group stage of the UEFA Champions League.

On 12 June 2007, Linderoth signed a three-year contract with Turkish side Galatasaray, where he wore the number 6.

On 22 January 2010, Linderoth was released by Galatasaray prematurely. On 12 November 2010, Linderoth officially announced the end of his career as a player. He stated he was aiming to become a coach like his father. He now works as a youth team coach at Elfsborg.

== International career ==
Despite Linderoth was eligible for the French National Team, but he chose for Swedish National Team.

Linderoth was a midfield dynamo for the Sweden national team where he also was assistant captain. Tobias played for Sweden in the Euro 2004 and Euro 2008, as well as in the 2002 and 2006 FIFA World Cup tournaments. In one game at the World Cup in 2002, he ran 14.6 kilometres (9.1 mi) during the 96 minutes of the match – not an unusual feature for the hard-working midfielder.

On 26 May 2008, Linderoth scored his second international goal, the only goal in a 1–0 win over Slovenia in a pre-Euro 2008 friendly warm-up.

On 6 September 2008, during a 2010 FIFA World Cup qualification game against Albania, he was injured and had to be substituted in the 6th minute – this was to be the last game he played for Sweden.

== Managerial career ==
After retiring, Linderoth spent a decade as the manager for Elfsborg's youth academy. On 18 November 2020, Linderoth was named the manager of Skövde AIK.

== Personal life ==
He is the son of football coach Anders Linderoth, a former Swedish international who played in the 1978 FIFA World Cup in Argentina, and Tobias was born in France during Anders' spell at Marseille. On 25 October 2006, Tobias and his wife Maria became parents when she gave birth to their first child.

== Career statistics ==
=== Club ===
Appearances and goals by club, season and competition
| Club | Season | League | | | Cup (Note: Includes English League Cup (1 in 2002–03 and 2 in 2003–04)) | | Europe | | Total | |
| Club | Season | Division | Apps | Goals | Apps | Goals | Apps | Goals | Apps | Goals |
|---|---|---|---|---|---|---|---|---|---|---|
| IFK Hässleholm | 1995 | Division 1 Södra | 7 | 0 | | | – | | 7 | 0 |
| Elfsborg | 1996 | Division 1 Södra | 10 | 0 | | | – | | 10 | 0 |
| Elfsborg | 1997 | Allsvenskan | 25 | 1 | | | – | | 25 | 1 |
| Elfsborg | 1998 | Allsvenskan | 22 | 3 | | | – | | 22 | 3 |
| Elfsborg | Total | | 57 | 4 | 0 | 0 | — | | 57 | 4 |
| Stabæk | 1999 | Tippeligaen | 23 | 3 | 3 | 0 | 2 | 0 | 28 | 3 |
| Stabæk | 2000 | Tippeligaen | 24 | 4 | 0 | 0 | 3 | 1 | 27 | 5 |
| Stabæk | 2001 | Tippeligaen | 21 | 2 | 3 | 0 | – | | 24 | 2 |
| Stabæk | Total | | 68 | 9 | 6 | 0 | 5 | 1 | 79 | 10 |
| Everton | 2001–02 | Premier League | 8 | 0 | 3 | 0 | – | | 11 | 0 |
| Everton | 2002–03 | Premier League | 5 | 0 | 1 | 0 | – | | 6 | 0 |
| Everton | 2003–04 | Premier League | 27 | 0 | 2 | 1 | – | | 29 | 1 |
| Everton | Total | | 40 | 0 | 6 | 1 | — | | 46 | 1 |
| Copenhagen | 2004–05 | Danish Superliga | 29 | 0 | 4 | 0 | 0 | 0 | 33 | 0 |
| Copenhagen | 2005–06 | Danish Superliga | 29 | 1 | 2 | 0 | 4 | 0 | 35 | 1 |
| Copenhagen | 2006–07 | Danish Superliga | 24 | 3 | 3 | 0 | 10 | 1 | 37 | 4 |
| Copenhagen | Total | | 82 | 4 | 9 | 0 | 14 | 1 | 105 | 5 |
| Galatasaray | 2007–08 | Süper Lig | 7 | 0 | 0 | 0 | 5 | 1 | 12 | 1 |
| Galatasaray | 2008–09 | Süper Lig | 2 | 0 | 0 | 0 | 1 | 0 | 3 | 0 |
| Galatasaray | 2009–10 | Süper Lig | 4 | 0 | 3 | 0 | 3 | 0 | 10 | 0 |
| Galatasaray | Total | | 13 | 0 | 3 | 0 | 9 | 1 | 25 | 1 |
| Career total | | | 267 | 17 | 24 | 1 | 28 | 3 | 319 | 21 |

- Also played 22 (2004–05, 2005–06, 2006–07) Royal League matches where he scored 1 goal.
- Also played 3 (2005, 2006) Tele2 LigaCup matches (unofficial).

=== International ===
Appearances and goals by national team and year
| National team | Year | Apps | Goals |
|---|---|---|---|
| Sweden | 1999 | 1 | 0 |
| Sweden | 2000 | 2 | 0 |
| Sweden | 2001 | 13 | 1 |
| Sweden | 2002 | 12 | 0 |
| Sweden | 2003 | 3 | 0 |
| Sweden | 2004 | 14 | 0 |
| Sweden | 2005 | 10 | 0 |
| Sweden | 2006 | 11 | 0 |
| Sweden | 2007 | 7 | 0 |
| Sweden | 2008 | 3 | 1 |
| Total | | 76 | 2 |

Scores and results list Sweden's goal tally first, score column indicates score after each Linderoth goal.

List of international goals scored by Tobias Linderoth
| No. | Date | Venue | Opponent | Score | Result | Competition |
|---|---|---|---|---|---|---|
| 1 | 17 February 2001 | Supachalasai Stadium, Bangkok, Thailand | China | 2–0 | 3–0 | 2001 King's Cup |
| 2 | 26 May 2008 | Ullevi, Gothenburg, Sweden | Slovenia | 1–0 | 1–0 | Friendly |

=== Managerial ===
As of match played 23 November 2025

Managerial record by team and tenure
| Team | Nat | From | To | Record | | | | | | | |
| Team | Nat | From | To | G | W | D | L | GF | GA | GD | Win % |
|---|---|---|---|---|---|---|---|---|---|---|---|
| Skövde | (Sweden) | 18 November 2020 | 31 December 2023 | 98 | 41 | 25 | 32 | 150 | 128 | +22 | 41.84 |
| Varberg | (Sweden) | 1 January 2024 | 1 August 2024 | 19 | 5 | 5 | 9 | 25 | 30 | −5 | 26.32 |
| Norrby | (Sweden) | 1 January 2025 | Present | 32 | 20 | 7 | 5 | 69 | 33 | +36 | 62.50 |
| Career total | | | | 149 | 66 | 37 | 46 | 244 | 191 | +53 | 44.30 |

== Honours ==
IF Elfsborg

- Division 1 Södra: 1996

FC Copenhagen

- Danish Superliga: 2005–06, 2006–07
- Royal League: 2004–05, 2005–06

Galatasaray

- Süper Lig: 2007–08
- Turkish Super Cup: 2008

Individual

- Swedish midfielder of the year: 2006, 2007
- FC Copenhagen Spring Profile: 2006
- Danish Superliga Player of the Year: 2005–06
