= Daniel Agger =

Danish footballer (born 1984)

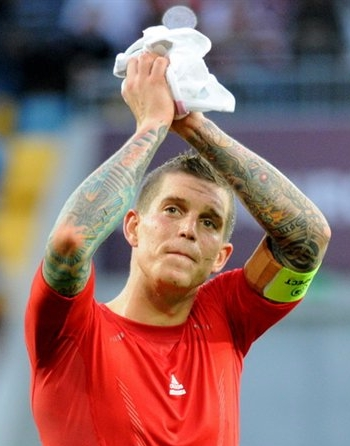
- Agger with Denmark at UEFA Euro 2012

Personal information
- Full name: Daniel Munthe Agger
- Date of birth: 12 December 1984 (age 41)
- Place of birth: Hvidovre, Denmark
- Height: 1.91 m (6 ft 3 in)
- Position: Centre-back

Team information
- Current team: Denmark (assistant)

Youth career
- –1996: Rosenhøj BK
- 1996–2004: Brøndby

Senior career*
Years	Team	Apps	(Gls)
2004–2006	Brøndby	34	(5)
2006–2014	Liverpool	175	(9)
2014–2016	Brøndby	43	(2)
Total		252	(16)

International career
2005–2016	Denmark	75	(12)

Managerial career
- 2021–2023: HB Køge
- 2024–: Denmark (assistant)
- * Club domestic league appearances and goals

Daniel Munthe Agger (Danish: [ˈtɛˀniəl ˈɑkɐ]; born 12 December 1984) is a Danish professional football coach and former player who is the assistant manager of the Danish national football team. As a player, he played as a centre-back for Brøndby and Liverpool and captained the Denmark national team. Agger was described as "a fine reader of the game, comfortable on the ball and blessed with a ferocious shot". He was the 2007 and 2012 Danish Football Player of the Year.

He started his senior career with Brøndby in July 2004, winning the Danish Superliga and the Danish Cup, before moving to Liverpool in January 2006. He made 175 Premier League appearances for the club (232 total) and won the League Cup and Community Shield. Agger returned to Brøndby for personal reasons in August 2014, and retired two years later at the age of 31.

A full international since 2005, Agger earned 75 caps and scored 11 goals for Denmark. He represented the nation at the 2010 FIFA World Cup and UEFA Euro 2012, captaining his country at the latter.

== Club career ==
=== Brøndby IF ===
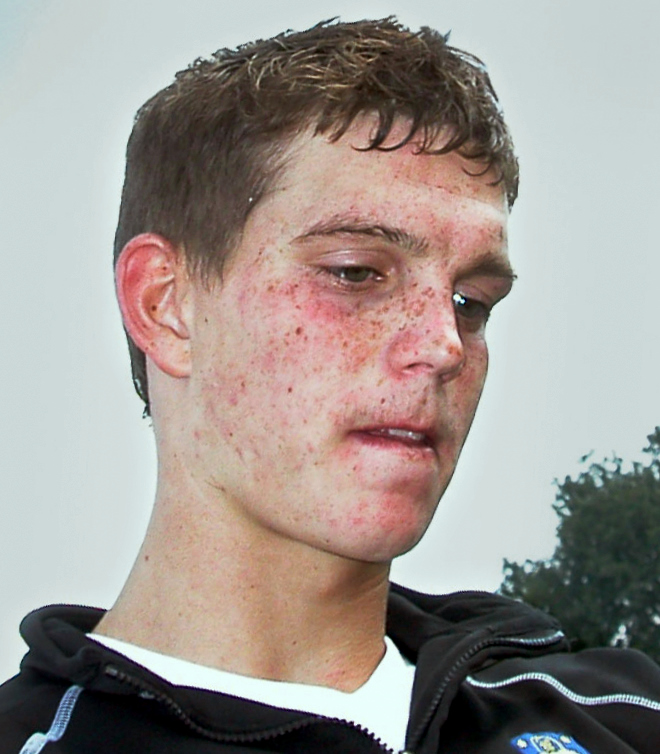
Agger training with Brøndby in 2005

In July 2004, he was moved from the youth squad to the first team, following the departure of Swedish international defender Andreas Jakobsson. Agger quickly established himself not only as a first team regular, but as one of the key components in the team that won the 2004–05 Danish Superliga championship. After the first half of the season Agger was named 2004 "talent of the year" by Spillerforeningen (the Danish equivalent of the English PFA).

An injury sustained in the 2005–06 Danish Superliga season in September forced him out for the remainder of 2005. On 6 December 2005 and at only 20 years of age, Agger was awarded the Danish "talent of the year" for all sports.

=== Liverpool ===
==== 2005–06 season ====
Agger was long linked to a transfer to a big club, and in the January 2006 transfer window, he got his wish and was looking to join Premier League team Liverpool, then holders of the UEFA Champions League. Agger did not travel with his Brøndby teammates for their winter training camp in January and on 12 January 2006, he signed a 4 1/2-year contract with Liverpool. The £6 million fee made him the most expensive footballer sold by a Danish club to a foreign club. During his first half-season at Liverpool, injuries limited Agger to four first-team appearances, and he missed the club's victory in the 2006 FA Cup Final.

==== 2006–07 season ====
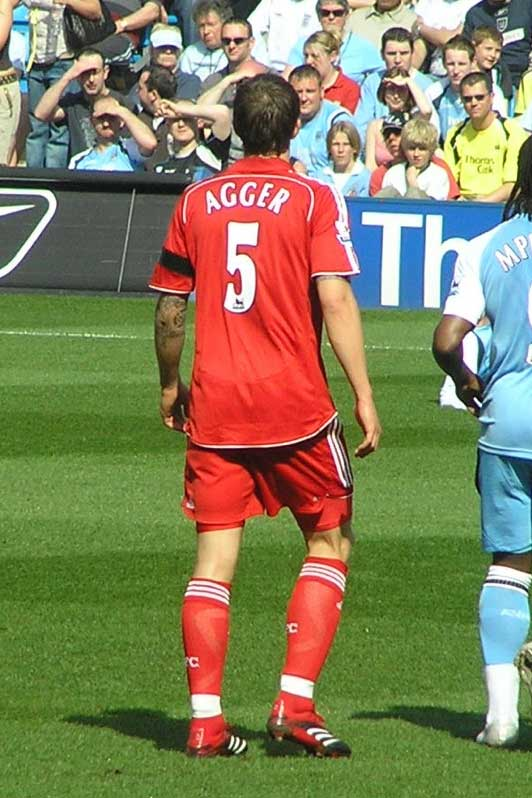
Agger playing for Liverpool in 2007

Agger played the full game as Liverpool won the 2006 FA Community Shield against Chelsea. Still adapting to the English game, he established himself in Liverpool's first team squad, competing with Liverpool vice-captain Jamie Carragher and former Finnish team captain Sami Hyypiä for the two starting places in the central defence. Agger scored his first goal for Liverpool on 26 August 2006 in a 2–1 win against West Ham United. Agger was allowed to run unchallenged toward the Kop-end goal and scored from 35 yards (32 m) out. Liverpool manager Rafael Benítez commented he was not surprised and that Agger has frequently scored such goals in training. The goal was named Goal of the Month for August by the BBC's Match of the Day, and later Liverpool's Premiership Goal of the Season. On 4 October 2006, he was given the PFA's fan award for impressive and solid displays in September.

Agger scored his second goal for the club in a Football League Cup away game against Birmingham City with a volley from close range during the seven minutes of first-half stoppage time. His third was against Arsenal, scoring a header in a 4–1 victory played on 31 March 2007. In the first semi-final of the 2006–07 Champions League, Agger received some criticism as Liverpool lost to Chelsea 1–0, after Chelsea striker Didier Drogba managed to dribble past him before making the assist to win the game. In the second leg of the semi-finals, Agger answered his critics by scoring another curler from a smartly-taken Steven Gerrard free-kick from just outside the penalty area, and helping Liverpool keep a clean sheet as the team beat Chelsea 1–0 on 1 May 2007. He went on to play in the 2007 UEFA Champions League Final which Liverpool lost 2–1 to Milan.

==== 2007–08 season ====
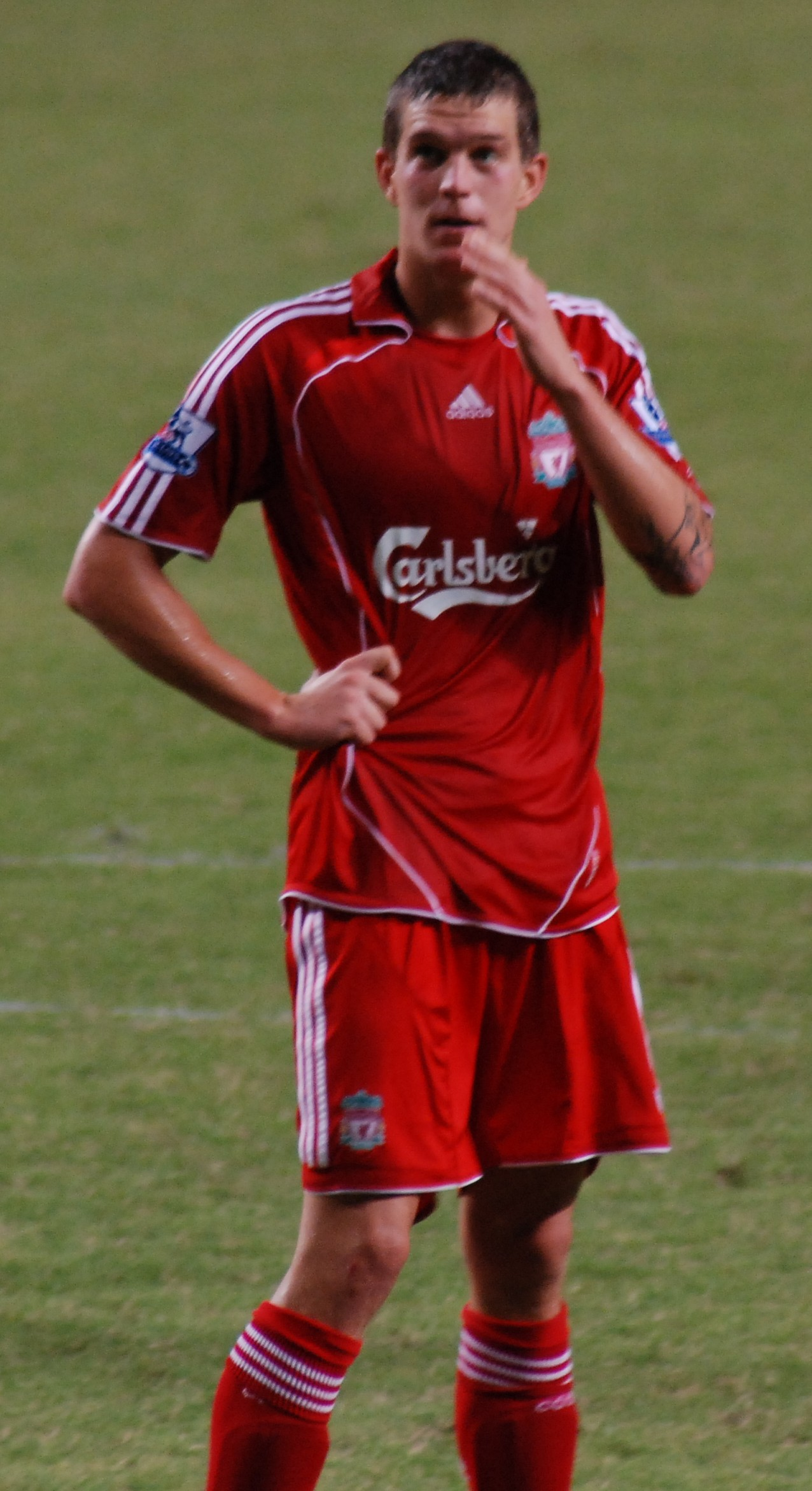
Agger playing for Liverpool in 2008

Agger started the 2007 pre-season scoring two goals in four games, including a left footed-finish against Hong Kong outfit South China. However, he suffered a metatarsal injury in September, again losing his place to Hyypiä. In January 2008, Agger began training and was attempting to regain match fitness, but a recurrence of the injury in his second metatarsal again ruled him out of action. After being examined by several specialists, it was reported that Agger would miss the remainder of the season to undergo surgery on his foot.

==== 2008–09 season ====
Agger returned to full training in the pre-season at Melwood and on 12 July 2008, Agger made his playing return as a substitute in Liverpool's friendly win over neighbours Tranmere Rovers. Agger stated after the match: "I am almost starting my career at Liverpool all over again". Agger was in the starting line up in Liverpool's first game of the season against Standard Liège in the Champions League qualifiers. The game ended 0–0. Agger then found himself sidelined the rest of August and much of September, and was not even included in the squad to face Manchester United. This was followed by rumours of a verbal exchange between Agger and Liverpool manager Benítez. However, Benítez insisted that there was no rift between Agger and himself.

After a month without playing, Agger returned to the starting line up against Crewe Alexandra in the League Cup. Agger played the full 90 minutes and marked his return by scoring the first goal from a free kick outside the box. Liverpool won the game 2–1.

Profiting in part from Škrtel's injury, Agger returned to the starting line up against Wigan for his first Premier League match of the season. Agger was, however, at least partly to blame for Wigan taking the lead when he lost the ball to Zaki after a pass from goalkeeper Reina. Agger redeemed himself by setting up Dirk Kuyt for the equaliser. Liverpool eventually won the match 3–2. On 11 April 2009, Agger scored the third goal for Liverpool from 30 yards against Blackburn Rovers. Liverpool went on to win 3–0. Agger celebrated, like the others who had scored in the match, by pointing to the sky in memory of victims in the Hillsborough disaster.

In May 2009, Agger signed a new five-year deal with Liverpool.

==== 2009–10 season ====
Agger underwent surgery for a recurring back injury in August 2009 and made his return on 25 October 2009 for the 2–0 win over rivals Manchester United at Anfield.

On 28 February 2010, Agger played his 100th competitive game for Liverpool, playing in the 2–1 home win against Blackburn Rovers. Agger played another 14 times in 2009–10, including scoring his seventh goal for the club, an outstanding backheel, against Benfica in the UEFA Europa League, and also helped Liverpool reach the semi-finals of the same competition.

==== 2010–11 season ====
Agger appeared against Arsenal on 15 August 2010, but got concussed in the second half of the game. As a result of the concussion, he missed the next few games. He also had other injury problems which kept him out until December. Martin Škrtel was preferred rather than Agger under Roy Hodgson and he threatened to quit the club with Juventus reportedly interested in him. After the departure of Hodgson, he featured in most of the games under Kenny Dalglish. However, Agger was ruled out for the remainder of the season, following a knee injury sustained in the match against West Bromwich Albion on 2 March 2011. At the end of the season, he had only managed 21 appearances for the Reds in all competitions.

==== 2011–12 season ====
On 1 August 2011, he scored two goals in a pre-season friendly against Vålerenga Fotball, the first a powerful header from a corner, the second a half-volley, also from a corner. Agger returned from injury against Rangers in a friendly match in which Liverpool lost 1–0. On 29 October 2011, Daniel Agger played his 100th Premier League game for Liverpool in a 0–2 win against West Bromwich Albion.

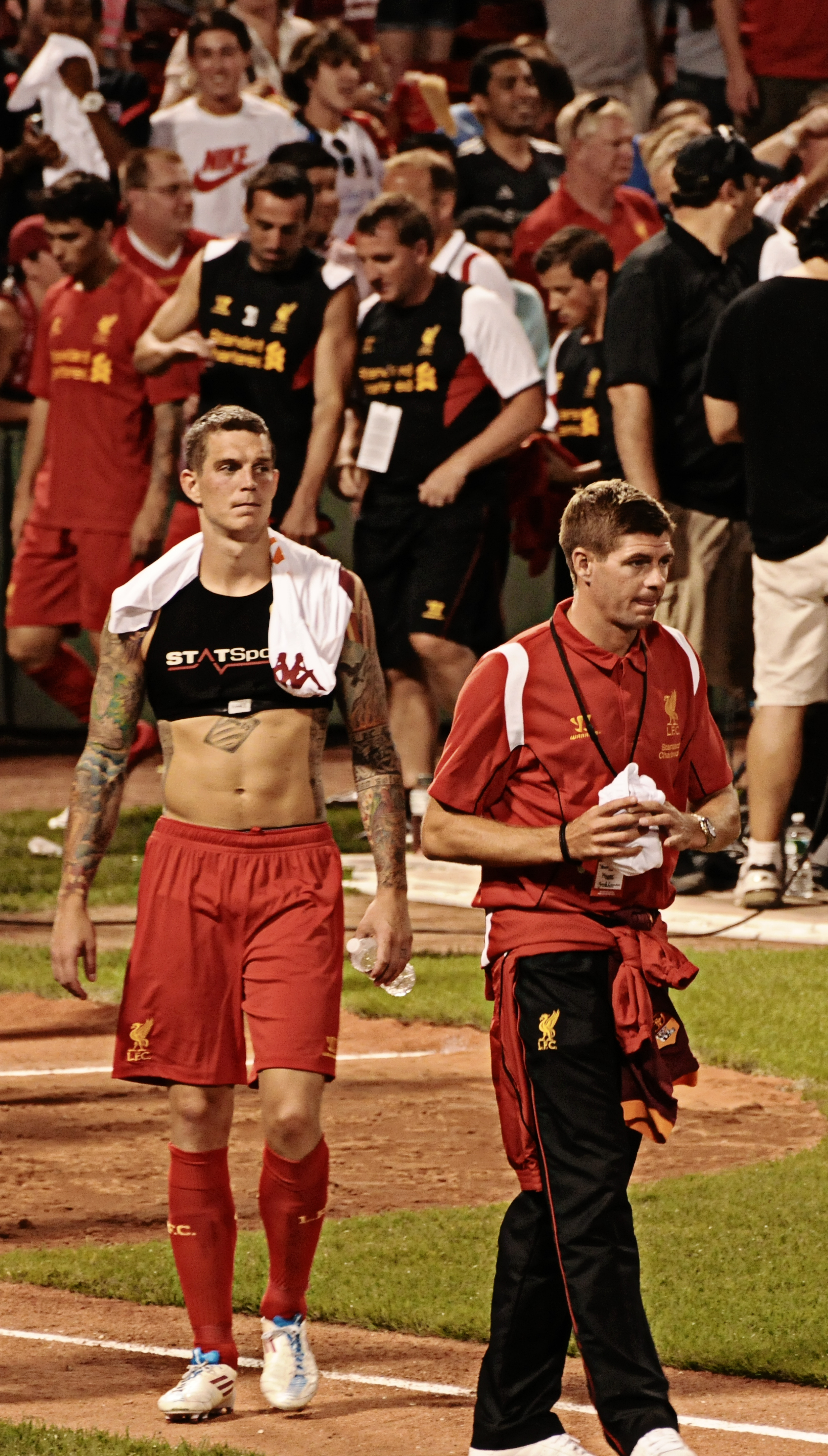
Agger (left) with Steven Gerrard after a game against Roma in July 2012

On 28 January 2012, Agger opened the scoring against Manchester United in the fourth round FA Cup tie, defeating them 2–1. It was his first Liverpool goal since 2010, when he scored in the Europa League tie against Benfica. On 26 February 2012, he helped Liverpool to win their first trophy since 2006 as they won the 2012 Football League Cup Final but injured his ribs during the match. On 7 April 2012, Agger made his return from injury as a second-half substitute against Aston Villa at Anfield, replacing José Enrique and hitting the crossbar with a header late on which led to the equalizer in a 1–1 draw. On 8 May 2012, Agger scored his first Premier League goal of the season in a 4–1 win against Chelsea which was also the last home game of the season for Liverpool.

==== 2012–13 season ====
Agger made his first start of the league campaign in a 3–0 defeat to West Bromwich Albion on 18 August, in which he conceded a penalty and was sent off for a foul on Shane Long. Although the penalty was saved, Liverpool were unable to hold on and slipped to a disappointing defeat. On 5 October, Agger signed a new long-term contract with Liverpool. On 12 November 2012, Agger was named Danish Player of the Year for the second time. On 1 December 2012, Agger scored against Southampton at Anfield, with a 43rd-minute header giving Liverpool a 1–0 win. On 30 December, Agger scored a beautiful header against QPR, assisted by a cross from captain Steven Gerrard. Agger made it 3–0 which also was the final score. Agger reached his 200th appearance for Liverpool on 21 February 2013 in a home Europe League tie against Zenit St. Petersburg. With Liverpool trailing 2–0 from the first leg, the Reds recorded a 3–1 win at Anfield, but were eliminated on away goals.

==== 2013–14 season ====
On 9 August 2013, it was confirmed that Agger was to become Liverpool's vice-captain, replacing the retired Jamie Carragher. This came shortly after reports had surfaced that Barcelona had made a bid to sign the Dane. Agger assisted Daniel Sturridge's goal with a flick-on header in the 1–0 victory against Manchester United. Agger did however, see his game time cut short due to Mamadou Sakho being preferred in the same role. On 1 January 2014, Agger scored his first goal of the season, meeting a Philippe Coutinho corner with his head in a 2–0 win over Hull. During much of 2014, Agger was left out of the team, with Sakho partnering Skrtel in defence. Agger was restored to the starting line up on 11 May 2014 in Liverpool's end-of-season match at home to Newcastle. With Liverpool trailing 1–0, Agger scored the equaliser by meeting a Steven Gerrard free kick at the back post.

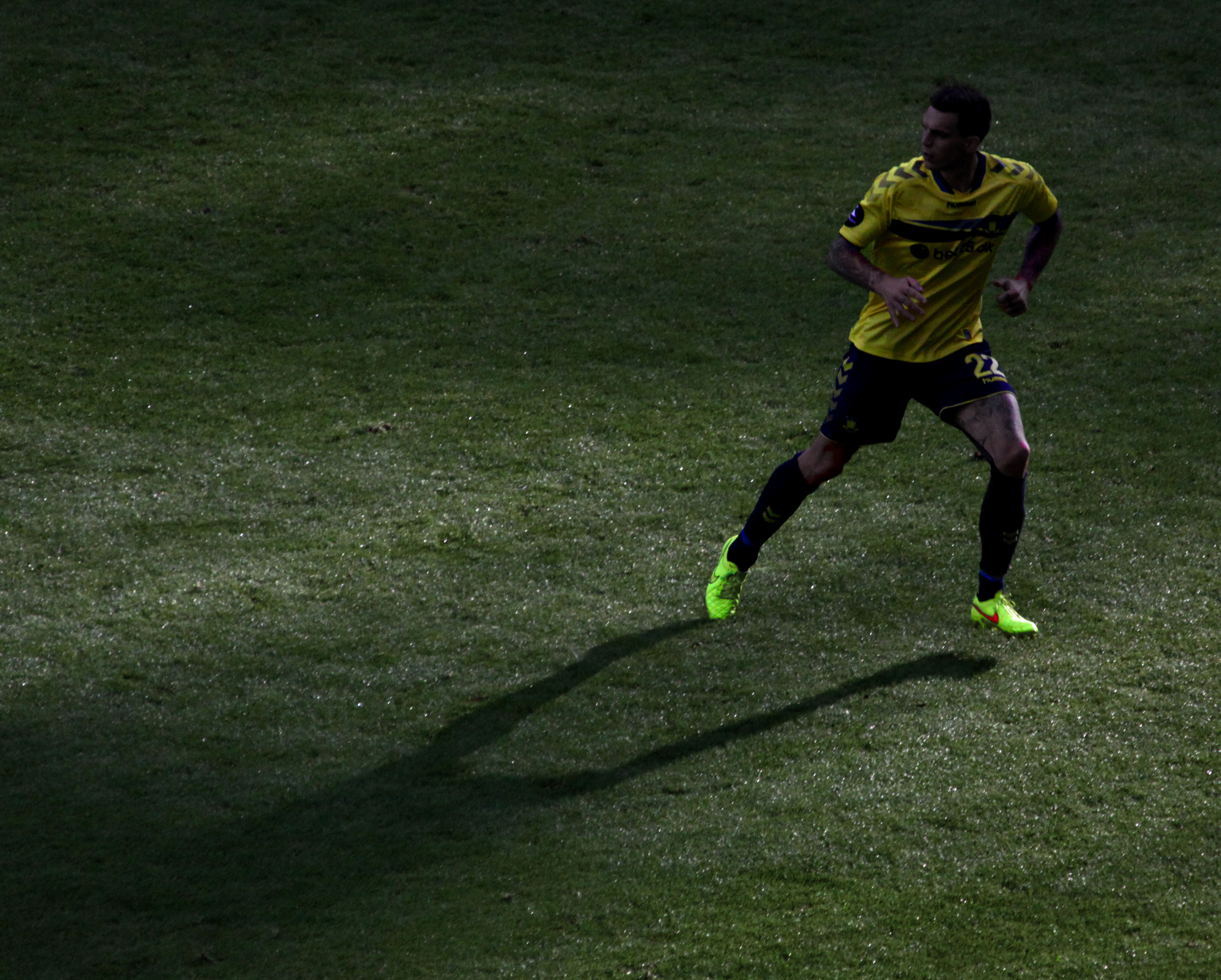
Agger playing for Brøndby in 2014

=== Return to Brøndby ===
On 30 August 2014, Liverpool confirmed that Agger had rejoined his previous club Brøndby IF on a two-year deal, which involved a considerable pay cut, for a fee of £3 million. Despite offers in England and other European countries, he wanted to play in a country with a less physically demanding league. He told Denmark's TV3 that Liverpool manager Brendan Rodgers was unappreciative of his efforts.

On 9 June 2016, at the age of 31, Agger announced his retirement at Brøndby at the expiration of his contract.

== International career ==
Agger made his debut for Denmark on 2 June 2005, playing the full 90 minutes of a 1–0 friendly win over Finland in Tampere. Agger spent the next national team match on the bench before playing the full 4–1 friendly win on 17 August against England, alongside Per Nielsen. On 7 September, he scored his first international goal in a 6–1 home win over Georgia in the nation's unsuccessful campaign to qualify for the 2006 FIFA World Cup. In May 2006, he played 10 games and scored 3 goals for the Danish under-21 national team, for which he was selected to play in the 2006 European Under-21 Championship tournament.

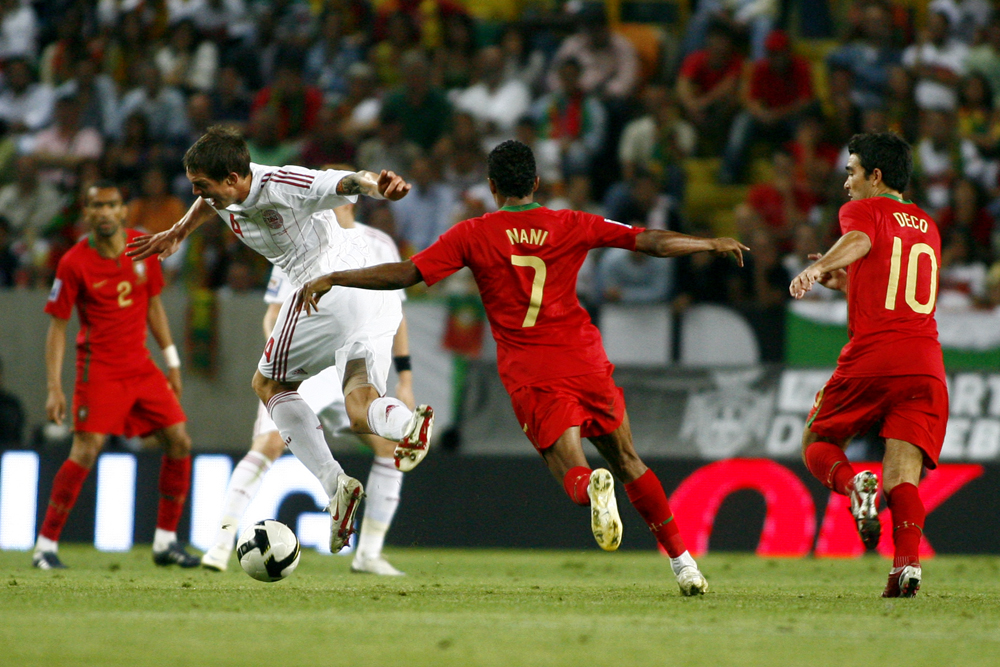
Agger (in white) playing for Denmark against Portugal in 2008

Agger scored on 2 June 2007 in a 3–3 home draw against rivals Sweden for UEFA Euro 2008 qualification; the game was abandoned in the last minute for crowd misbehaviour and awarded to the Swedes.

He made eight appearances in qualification for the 2010 FIFA World Cup, scoring once in a 3–0 home win over Malta. In the finals in South Africa, Agger scored an own goal to open a 2–0 loss to the Netherlands in the first game; Simon Poulsen had headed the ball into him while trying to clear Robin van Persie's cross. He played the other two fixtures in a group stage exit.

Agger first captained Denmark on 11 August 2010 in a 2–2 home friendly draw with neighbours Germany. He was given the armband a year later as Poulsen suffered from stress. Under Agger's captaincy, the Danes qualified for UEFA Euro 2012 in Poland and Ukraine, and he was again a fixture in a group stage elimination.

On 15 October 2013, Agger scored two penalties in a 6–0 home win against the Maltese in 2014 FIFA World Cup qualification, securing second place in their group. The following 28 May, from the penalty spot in added time, he scored the only goal of a win over Sweden in a match celebrating the 125th anniversary of the Danish Football Association. Denmark did not qualify for Euro 2016, and so Agger revealed his intention to end his active playing career in 2016, which would also see his international retirement.

== Personal life ==
Agger selected Volbeat's The Garden's Tale as his choice for the "LFC Athens 2007 Playlist" in the buildup of Liverpool's 2007 UEFA Champions League Final appearance.

In May 2010, Agger married girlfriend Sofie Nielsen in Denmark. The couple wore matching white outfits for the wedding, which was followed by a reception at the Nimb Hotel in Copenhagen. They have two sons.

In September 2014, Agger donated 20,000 kroner, about £2100, to the Denmark homeless national football side to help pay for travel expenses so the team could make it to the Homeless World Cup in Chile.

Agger founded The Agger Foundation in 2012 aiming to help children in need.

=== Tattoos ===
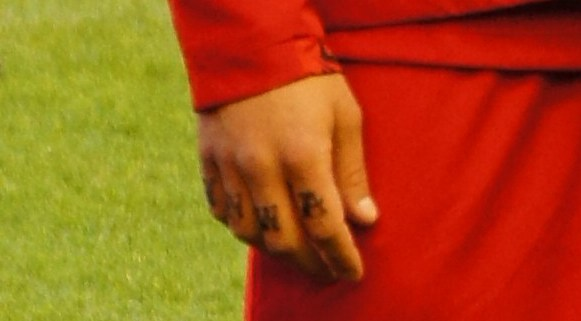
Agger has "YNWA" tattooed on his knuckles

Outside of football, Agger is a qualified tattoo artist. He has numerous tattoos including a Viking on his upper right arm, a large drawing of Vikings and a graveyard that spans his whole back, which includes his birth date and the Latin motto "Mors certa, hora incerta" ("death is certain, its hour is uncertain"), forming a memento mori. He also features an intricate band around his left elbow which includes the phrase "Succes er at leve som man selv vil" ("Success is to live as you wish" in Danish). In August 2012, during a period of intense speculation regarding his future at the club, Agger had the letters "YNWA" tattooed on the fingers of his right hand, referencing the anthem of Liverpool F.C., "You'll Never Walk Alone".

== After retirement ==
In addition to leaving football, Agger also left Denmark with his wife. They moved to Marbella in Spain. Agger runs a sewerage company named KloAgger together with his brother, uncle and childhood friend. He also invested in Tattoodo together with friends, Christian Stadil, the owner of Hummel International and a famous tattooist, Ami James.

Agger played a charity match for Liverpool on 25 March 2017 against Real Madrid.

In April 2017, Agger revealed one of his new golf projects. The project raises money to donate to the Danish charity fund "Red Barnet". Agger started a fund named The Agger Foundation, and held events called "Agger for Charity". Agger invited several big names as former Liverpool stars, Pepe Reina and Steven Gerrard, to his charity events in Copenhagen. Agger worked in cooperation with former Danish prime minister, Helle Thorning-Schmidt. Agger has always had a passion for golf and has donated a lot of money to charity through the years.

== Managerial career ==
In March 2021 it was announced that Agger would become manager of Danish 1st Division side HB Køge in June 2021 with former Danish national team player Lars Jacobsen as his assistant. In August 2021, Agger was registered as a player again, boding a comeback to playing football. After two seasons in charge of the club, Agger left by mutual consent in June 2023.

On 8 August 2024, Agger became assistant manager of the Denmark national football team.

== Career statistics ==
=== Club ===
Appearances and goals by club, season and competition
Club	Season	League			National cup (Note: Includes Danish Cup, FA Cup)		League cup (Note: Includes Danish League Cup, Football League Cup)		Europe		Other		Total	
Club	Season	Division	Apps	Goals	Apps	Goals	Apps	Goals	Apps	Goals	Apps	Goals	Apps	Goals
Brøndby	2004–05	Danish Superliga	26	5					1 (Note: Appearance in UEFA Cup)	0			27	5
Brøndby	2005–06	Danish Superliga	8	0					5 (Note: Four appearances in UEFA Champions League, one appearance in UEFA Cup)	0			13	0
Brøndby	Total		34	5					6	0			40	5
Liverpool	2005–06	Premier League	4	0	0	0	—		—		—		4	0
Liverpool	2006–07	Premier League	27	2	1	0	2	1	12 (Note: Appearances in UEFA Champions League)	1	1 (Note: Appearance in FA Community Shield)	0	43	4
Liverpool	2007–08	Premier League	5	0	0	0	0	0	1	0	—		6	0
Liverpool	2008–09	Premier League	18	1	1	0	2	1	5	0	—		26	2
Liverpool	2009–10	Premier League	23	0	1	0	0	0	12 (Note: Four appearances in UEFA Champions League, eight appearances and one goal in UEFA Europa League)	1	—		36	1
Liverpool	2010–11	Premier League	16	0	1	0	1	0	3 (Note: Appearances in UEFA Europa League)	0	—		21	0
Liverpool	2011–12	Premier League	27	1	3	1	4	0	—		—		34	2
Liverpool	2012–13	Premier League	35	3	0	0	0	0	4	0	—		39	3
Liverpool	2013–14	Premier League	20	2	2	0	1	0	—		—		23	2
Liverpool	Total		175	9	9	1	10	2	37	2	1	0	232	14
Brøndby	2014–15	Danish Superliga	19	1	0	0	—		—		—		19	1
Brøndby	2015–16	Danish Superliga	24	1	0	0	—		1	0	—		24	1
Career total			252	16	9	1	10	2	44	2	1	0	305	21

=== International ===
Appearances and goals by national team and year
National team	Year	Apps	Goals
Denmark	2005	4	1
Denmark	2006	6	0
Denmark	2007	8	1
Denmark	2008	5	1
Denmark	2009	6	0
Denmark	2010	9	0
Denmark	2011	6	2
Denmark	2012	9	1
Denmark	2013	8	4
Denmark	2014	5	2
Denmark	2015	7	0
Denmark	2016	2	0
Total		75	12

Scores and results list Denmark's goal tally first, score column indicates score after each Agger goal.

List of international goals scored by Daniel Agger
No.	Date	Venue	Cap	Opponent	Score	Result	Competition	Ref.
1	7 September 2005	Parken Stadium, Copenhagen, Denmark	4	Georgia	3–1	6–1	2006 FIFA World Cup qualification	
2	11 October 2008	Parken Stadium, Copenhagen, Denmark	22	Malta	2–0	3–0	2010 FIFA World Cup qualification	
3	9 February 2011	Parken Stadium, Copenhagen, Denmark	39	England	1–0	1–2	Friendly	
4	15 November 2011	Blue Water Arena, Esbjerg, Denmark	44	Finland	1–0	2–1	Friendly	
5	2 June 2012	Parken Stadium, Copenhagen, Denmark	46	Australia	1–0	2–0	Friendly	
6	26 March 2013	Parken Stadium, Copenhagen, Denmark	56	Bulgaria	1–1	1–1	2014 FIFA World Cup qualification	
7	10 September 2013	Hrazdan Stadium, Yerevan, Armenia	58	Armenia	1–0	1–0	2014 FIFA World Cup qualification	
8	15 October 2013	Parken Stadium, Copenhagen, Denmark	60	Malta	2–0	6–0	2014 FIFA World Cup qualification	
9	15 October 2013	Parken Stadium, Copenhagen, Denmark	60	Malta	4–0	6–0	2014 FIFA World Cup qualification	
10	28 May 2014	Parken Stadium, Copenhagen, Denmark	64	Sweden	1–0	1–0	Friendly	
11	3 September 2014	TRE-FOR Park, Odense, Denmark	65	Turkey	1–0	1–2	Friendly	

== Honours ==
Brøndby

- Danish Superliga: 2004–05
- Danish Cup: 2004–05
- Danish League Cup: 2005

Liverpool

- Football League Cup: 2011–12
- FA Community Shield: 2006
- FA Cup runner-up: 2011–12
- UEFA Champions League runner-up: 2006–07

Individual

- Danish Football Player of the Year: 2007, 2012
- Danish U21 Young Player of the Year: 2005
- BBC Goal of the Month: August 2006
