= William Kvist =

Danish footballer (born 1985)

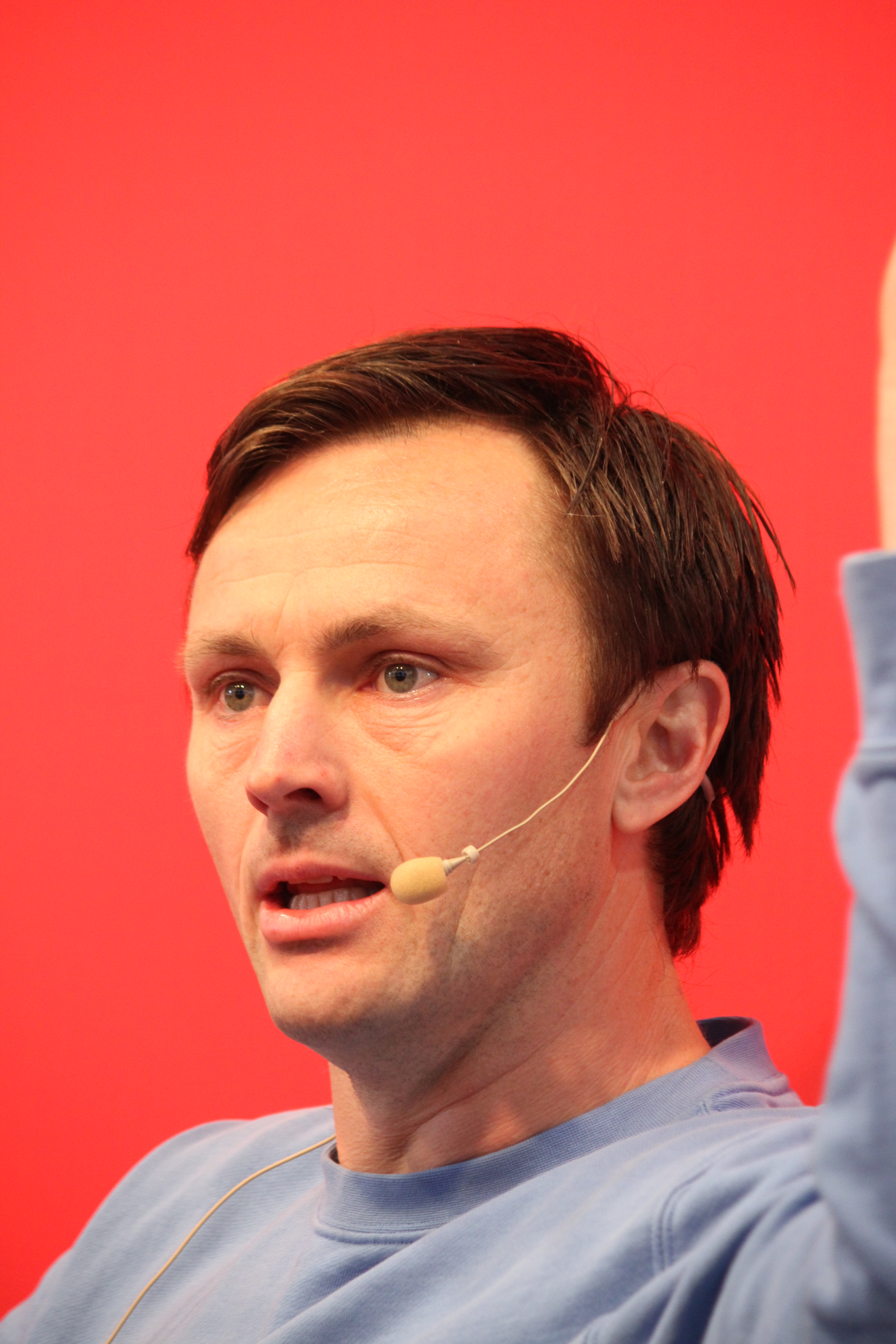
- Kvist in 2025

Personal information
- Full name: William Vitved Kvist
- Date of birth: 24 February 1985 (age 41)
- Place of birth: Rønde, Denmark
- Height: 1.85 m (6 ft 1 in)
- Position: Defensive midfielder

Team information
- Current team: Copenhagen (director of sports)

Youth career
- 1990–1992: Thorsager Rønde IF
- 1992–2004: KB

Senior career*
| Years | Team | Apps | (Gls) |
| 2004–2011 | Copenhagen | 181 | (7) |
| 2011–2014 | VfB Stuttgart | 68 | (0) |
| 2014 | → Fulham (loan) | 8 | (0) |
| 2014–2015 | Wigan Athletic | 26 | (0) |
| 2015–2019 | Copenhagen | 104 | (2) |
| Total | | 387 | (9) |

International career
| 2000–2001 | Denmark U16 | 5 | (0) |
| 2001–2002 | Denmark U17 | 19 | (4) |
| 2002 | Denmark U18 | 3 | (0) |
| 2003–2004 | Denmark U19 | 6 | (0) |
| 2004–2005 | Denmark U20 | 5 | (0) |
| 2006 | Denmark U21 | 5 | (0) |
| 2007–2018 | Denmark | 81 | (2) |
- * Club domestic league appearances and goals

William Vitved Kvist (né Kvist Jørgensen; born 24 February 1985) is a Danish former professional footballer who played as a midfielder for Danish club Copenhagen as well as for the Denmark national team.

He played 43 matches and scored four goals for various national youth teams, and was an important player to the senior team.

== Club career ==
Born in Rønde in Jutland, Kvist started his football career at his local club Thorsager Rønde IF at the age of five. Two years later he moved to Copenhagen where he started with KB; one of the two clubs behind F.C. Copenhagen. While at KB, he made his debut for the Danish youth national teams (in November 2000), and played four matches at the 2002 UEFA European Under-17 Football Championship.

As a child, Kvist also played handball; as a footballer he is renowned for his very long throw-ins. In the 1996–97 season, he won the Danish youth championship in both sports: in handball with FIF and in football with KB.

Kvist was promoted to F.C. Copenhagen's first team in 2004. He debuted on 23 April 2005 in a match against FC Nordsjælland where he replaced an injured Ole Tobiasen in the right-back position. His first F.C. Copenhagen goal came on 22 October 2006 in a 3–0 win against Viborg FF, where he scored the last goal from long range.

Against Ajax in the UEFA Champions League third qualification round 2006 Kvist played a pass that deflected off Ajax defender Thomas Vermaelen for an own goal. This goal eventually sent F.C. Copenhagen through to the Champions League Group Stage.

In the season 2005–06, Kvist was often used as a substitute, particularly on the left wing – a position he didn't enjoy playing. He has also played in defence and other midfield positions.

Kvist was called up for the national team by manager Morten Olsen for a friendly tour of the United States, El Salvador and Honduras in January 2007. He was in the starting lineup for all three games of the tour, including a 3–1 loss to the United States national team on 20 January 2007.

After right-back Lars Jacobsen transferred to 1. FC Nürnberg during the summer of 2007, Kvist was selected by coach Solbakken to be the club's primary right-back, after Solbakken had considered about 50 different players, without result. On 13 August, Kvist suggested he wished to play the position only until Christmas, preferring to evolve as a central midfield player, which he considered his best position.

In the 2010–11 season, Kvist secured a starting place in central midfield, and paired well with newly arrived Brazilian midfielder Claudemir de Souza. Kvist's form led to the club's captain (and player with most appearances), Hjalte Bo Nørregaard, losing his position in the first eleven. Kvist adopted a leading role and his style reminded fans and media of former captain, Peter Nielsen. Kvist is considered a model central midfielder. He rarely concedes possession, uses the ball intelligently, is combative in the tackle and has the vision to pick out key passes.

On 16 June 2011, it was announced that Kvist had been sold to German Bundesliga club VfB Stuttgart for an undisclosed fee. He signed a four-year contract. During his second season at the Baden-Wuerttemberg Club, Kvist found his starting place under threat and chances more limited. During the 2013 close season he was linked with a €7m move to Atletico Madrid, which did not come to pass.

On 30 January 2014, Kvist signed for English Premier League club Fulham on loan until the end of the 2013–14 season with an option for Fulham to sign him permanently in the summer. Upon joining Fulham, Kvist stated he will do all in his power to keep Fulham survive relegation. He made his debut two days later, in a 3–0 defeat at home to Southampton.

On 1 September 2014, Kvist moved on a free transfer to Championship side Wigan Athletic signing a one-year deal.

== International career ==
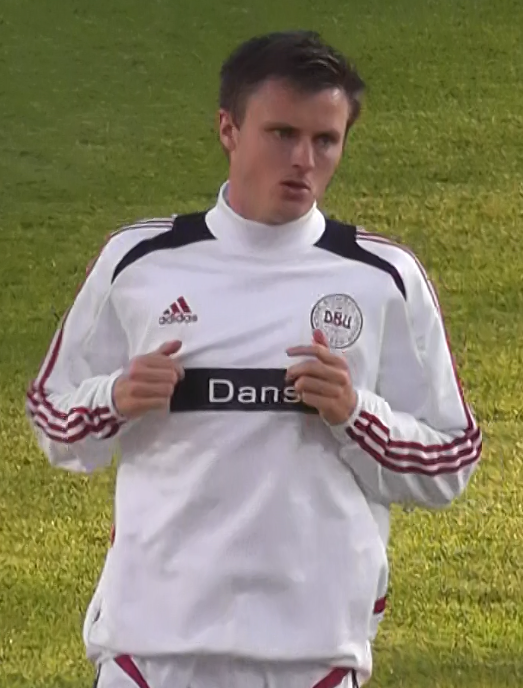
Kvist playing for Denmark

Kvist was first called up to the Danish national team on 17 August 2007, for a friendly match against the Republic of Ireland on 22 August. He went on to represent his country at UEFA European Championships and World Cups and is a firmly-established member of the side.

== Later career ==
After retiring in the summer 2019, Kvist began a new chapter as a board member under Bo Rygaard, chairman of the board of Parken Sport & Entertainment, the company that was founded to run F.C. Copenhagen. At the same time, he would also sit on the board of Copenhagen's e-sports venture, North, just as he would help the A national team with the negotiations with Danish Football Association.

After F.C. Copenhagen manager Ståle Solbakken was fired on 10 October 2020, Kvist was appointed interim director of sports for the club.

== Career statistics ==
=== International ===
Appearances and goals by national team and year
| National team | Year | Apps | Goals |
|---|---|---|---|
| Denmark | 2007 | 2 | 0 |
| Denmark | 2008 | 4 | 0 |
| Denmark | 2009 | 5 | 0 |
| Denmark | 2010 | 5 | 0 |
| Denmark | 2011 | 10 | 0 |
| Denmark | 2012 | 9 | 1 |
| Denmark | 2013 | 9 | 1 |
| Denmark | 2014 | 9 | 0 |
| Denmark | 2015 | 8 | 0 |
| Denmark | 2016 | 7 | 0 |
| Denmark | 2017 | 9 | 0 |
| Denmark | 2018 | 4 | 0 |
| Total | | 81 | 2 |

Scores and results list Denmark's goal tally first, score column indicates score after each Kvist goal.

List of international goals scored by William Kvist
| No. | Date | Venue | Opponent | Score | Result | Competition |
|---|---|---|---|---|---|---|
| 1 | 16 October 2012 | Stadio Giuseppe Meazza, Milan | Italy | 1–2 | 1–3 | 2014 World Cup qualifiers |
| 2 | 15 November 2013 | MCH Arena, Herning | Norway | 1–0 | 2–1 | Friendly |

== Honours ==
Copenhagen

- Danish Superliga: 2005–06, 2006–07, 2008–09, 2009–10, 2010–11, 2015–16, 2016–17, 2018–19
- Danish Cup: 2008–09, 2015–16, 2016–17

Individual

- Danish Superliga Player of the Year: 2010
- Danish Football Player of the Year: 2010, 2011
- Danish Cup Fighter: 2016
