= Carsten Fredgaard =

Danish footballer (born 1976)

Personal information
- Date of birth: 20 May 1976 (age 50)
- Place of birth: Blovstrød, Denmark
- Height: 1.84 m (6 ft 0 in)
- Position: Left midfielder

Youth career
- Blovstrød IF

Senior career*
Years	Team	Apps	(Gls)
1995–1999	Lyngby	106	(29)
1999–2001	Sunderland	1	(0)
2000	→ West Bromwich Albion (loan)	5	(0)
2000–2001	→ Bolton Wanderers (loan)	5	(0)
2001–2006	Copenhagen	50	(3)
2003–2004	→ Nordsjælland (loan)	29	(3)
2005	→ Randers (loan)	10	(0)
2006–2009	Randers	66	(4)
2009–2011	AB		
2011–2014	HIK		
2016–2021	Græsrødderne		

International career
1993–1995	Denmark u-19	3	(0)
1996–1997	Denmark u-21	10	(0)
1999	Denmark	1	(0)

Managerial career
- 2010–2011: AB (player assistant)
- * Club domestic league appearances and goals

Carsten Fredgaard (born 20 May 1976) is a Danish former professional footballer who played as a midfielder.

His position was on the left, mainly as midfielder, but could also act both as a fullback or a winger. He has played for a number of clubs in Danish and English football, winning two Danish Superliga titles with Copenhagen and the 2006 Danish Cup with Randers. He has played a single game for the Denmark national team, and has represented his country 13 times on the various national youth squads.

== Biography ==
Fredgaard started his senior career with Lyngby, whom he represented on the national under-19 and under-21 national teams. He made his debut in the Danish Superliga championship on 3 September 1995. He scored 16 goals in 31 games during the 1998–99 Superliga season, which prompted English club Sunderland to offer Lyngby a £ 1,500,000 million transfer deal.

Fredgaard signed his first full-time professional contract at age 22, when he moved to Sunderland on 24 March 1999. While at Sunderland, he played his only Denmark national team game in August 1999. His time at Sunderland was not successful, earning the undeserved nickname Chocolate Fireguard, bringing only a single appearance in the Premier League. Despite some impressive League Cup showings that saw him score two brilliant goals against Walsall (his only goals for the club), and in the next round complete a perfect cross for a Danny Dichio goal, Fredgaard failed to force his way into the first-team, making just one appearance in the league as a substitute away to Chelsea. On 9 February 2000 he was loaned out to Division One side West Bromwich Albion. Back at Sunderland for the 2000–01 season, he was once more loaned out to a Division One team on 17 November 2000, this time playing two months for Bolton Wanderers.

In July 2001, Fredgaard moved back to Denmark, as Copenhagen (FCK) bought him in a £500,000 transfer deal. Unable to hold down a place in the starting line-up in FCK's championship-winning 2002-03 Superliga season, Fredgaard went on loan to fellow Superliga teams Nordsjælland and Randers. He played one game as FCK won the 2005–06 Superliga title. When his contract expired in January 2006, he moved to second-tier Danish 1st Division club Randers on a free transfer, signing a two-year contract. He was named "Man of the Match" as Randers won the 2006 Danish Cup, and he helped the club win promotion to the Superliga for the 2006–07 Superliga season. In July 2009, he moved on to 1st Division club AB.

== Honours ==
Copenhagen

- Danish Superliga: 2002–03, 2005–06
- Danish Super Cup: 2001, 2004

Randers

- Danish Cup: 2005–06
