= Janne Saarinen =

Finnish footballer (born 1977)

Personal information
- Full name: Janne Johannes Saarinen
- Date of birth: 28 February 1977 (age 49)
- Place of birth: Espoo, Finland
- Height: 1.82 m (6 ft 0 in)
- Position: Left-back

Senior career*
Years	Team	Apps	(Gls)
1993–1996	HJK	46	(2)
1997–1998	IFK Göteborg	3	(0)
1999–2000	HJK	37	(3)
2001–2003	Rosenborg	41	(0)
2003–2004	1860 München	17	(0)
2004–2006	Copenhagen	16	(0)
2006–2007	Honka	38	(8)
2008–2009	Häcken	37	(0)
2009–2010	HJK	5	(0)
Total		240	(13)

International career
2000–2008	Finland	42	(0)
- * Club domestic league appearances and goals

Janne Johannes Saarinen (born 28 February 1977, in Espoo) is a retired Finnish footballer.

== Career ==
Saarinen started his career as a promising attacking midfielder at HJK Helsinki, making his Veikkausliiga debut in 1993. In 1997, he moved to Swedish giants IFK Göteborg, but never made a breakthrough – partly because of injuries.

After two years he returned to HJK, where he was converted to a left back by the then coach Jyrki Heliskoski. He impressed in his new position, earning a move to Norwegian giants Rosenborg in 2001 for a transfer fee of €800,000.

In 2003, Saarinen moved to 1860 Munich of the German Bundesliga for €500,000, but he was not successful there, and moved to Danish giants FC København in 2004.

Saarinen returned to Finland with home-town club FC Honka for the 2006 season, stating he wanted to play in a more attacking role once more. In 2008 Saarinen joined Allsvenskan club Häcken in Sweden, where he played for two years. On 11 September 2009, Saarinen went back to HJK Helsinki.

== International career ==
Saarinen made his debut for the Finnish national team on 16 August 2000 against Norway. He was Finland's first choice left back for most of the first half of the 2000s.

== Career statistics ==
=== Club ===
As of 31 December 2020

Appearances and goals by club, season and competition
Club	Season	League			National cup (Note: Includes Suomen Cup, DFB-Pokal and Svenska Cupen)		Continental		Total	
Club	Season	Division	Apps	Goals	Apps	Goals	Apps	Goals	Apps	Goals
HJK	1993	Veikkausliiga	1	0	0	0	0	0	1	0
HJK	1994	Veikkausliiga	10	1	0	0	2 (Note: Includes UEFA Cup Winners' Cup)	0	12	1
HJK	1995	Veikkausliiga	14	0	0	0	2 (Note: Includes UEFA Intertoto Cup)	0	16	0
HJK	1996	Veikkausliiga	21	1	0	0	2 (Note: Includes UEFA Cup)	0	23	1
HJK	Total		46	2	0	0	6	0	52	2
IFK Göteborg	1997	Allsvenskan	3	0	—		—		3	0
IFK Göteborg	1998	Allsvenskan	0	0	—		—		0	0
IFK Göteborg	Total		3	0	0	0	0	0	3	0
HJK	1999	Veikkausliiga	8	0	0	0	0	0	8	0
HJK	2000	Veikkausliiga	29	2	1	1	3	0	33	3
HJK	Total		37	2	1	1	3	0	41	3
Rosenborg	2001	Tippeligaen	19	0	0	0	7 (Note: Includes UEFA Champions League)	0	26	0
Rosenborg	2002	Tippeligaen	19	0	0	0	8	0	27	0
Rosenborg	2003	Tippeligaen	3	0	—		—		3	0
Rosenborg	Total		41	0	0	0	15	0	56	0
1860 Munich	2003–04	Bundesliga	17	0	1	0	—		18	0
Copenhagen	2004–05	Danish Superliga	9	0	0	0	2	0	11	0
Copenhagen	2005–06	Danish Superliga	7	0	0	0	3	0	10	0
Copenhagen	Total		16	0	0	0	5	0	21	0
Honka	2006	Veikkausliiga	16	5	—		—		16	5
Honka	2007	Veikkausliiga	22	3	1	1	4	0	27	4
Honka	Total		38	8	1	1	4	0	43	9
BK Häcken	2008	Superettan	24	0	2	2	—		26	2
BK Häcken	2009	Allsvenskan	13	0	0	0	—		13	0
BK Häcken	Total		37	0	2	2	0	0	39	2
HJK	2010	Veikkausliiga	5	0	1	0	0	0	6	0
Career total			240	18	6	4	33	0	279	22

=== International ===
Finland national team
Year	Apps	Goals
2000	4	0
2001	7	0
2002	8	0
2003	9	0
2004	5	0
2005	7	0
2006	1	0
2007	0	0
2008	1	0
Total	42	0

== Honours ==
HJK Helsinki

- Finnish Cup: 1993, 1996, 2000
- Veikkausliiga: 2010

Rosenborg

- Tippeligaen: 2001, 2002, 2003

FC Copenhagen

- Danish Super Cup: 2004
- Royal League: 2004–05
- Danish Superliga: 2005–06
