= Viasat Cup =

2006 Danish football tournament

Viasat Cup logo

The Viasat Cup was a 2006 Danish football tournament, starting at the end of the Danish Superliga 2005–06. The tournament was held due to Denmark's failure to qualify for the 2006 FIFA World Cup, a tournament which had caused FIFA to demand that the Superliga ended on 14 May. Viasat, holding the broadcast rights to the Superliga, and "Divisionsforeningen" contrived the tournament, and the most matches were broadcast on Danish TV3+.

FC Nordsjælland won the final against Aalborg BK 3–1 on Aalborg Stadion, with AaB's Poul Hübertz scoring after just 40 seconds, but 25 minutes later Anders Due equalized. In second half were Due again in focus; after 54 minutes he had a shot on the bar, and 20 minutes he assisted Jukka Santala's goal to 1–2. In the 82nd Jonathan Richter made the result definitive.

The favorites to the title, F.C. Copenhagen and Brøndby IF, were beat in the quarter finals, by respectively the winners FC Nordsjælland and Esbjerg fB.

== Seedings ==
Pot 1	Pot 2	Pot 3
F.C. Copenhagen; Brøndby IF; Viborg FF; Odense BK	Esbjerg fB; Aalborg BK; FC Nordsjælland; FC Midtjylland	Silkeborg IF; AC Horsens; Aarhus GF; SønderjyskE

== Groups ==
The draw was held on 12 March.

Tiebreakers, if necessary, are applied in the following order:

1. Cumulative goal difference in all group matches.
2. Total goals scored in all group matches.
3. Draw.

=== Group A ===
Team	Pts	Pld	W	D	L	GF	GA	GD
1. Esbjerg fB	6	2	2	0	0	6	2	+4
2. Aarhus GF	3	2	1	0	1	4	3	+1
3. Viborg FF	0	2	0	0	2	0	5	−5

18 May 2006
AGF	2–0	Viborg	18:30	NRGi Park
21 May 2006
Viborg	0–3	Esbjerg	18:00	Viborg Stadion
23 May 2006
Esbjerg	3–2	AGF	20:30	Esbjerg Idrætspark

=== Group B ===
Team	Pts	Pld	W	D	L	GF	GA	GD
1. Aalborg BK	4	2	1	1	0	4	2	+2
2. Brøndby IF	4	2	1	1	0	2	1	+1
3. SønderjyskE	0	2	0	0	2	1	4	−3

18 May 2006
SønderjyskE	0–1	Brøndby	18:30	Haderslev Fodboldstadion
21 May 2006
Brøndby	1–1	AaB	17:00	Brøndby Stadion
23 May 2006
AaB	3–1	SønderjyskE	18:30	Aalborg Stadion

=== Group C ===
Team	Pts	Pld	W	D	L	GF	GA	GD
1. Silkeborg IF	4	2	1	1	0	2	0	+2
2. FC Nordsjælland	4	2	1	1	0	2	1	+1
3. Odense BK	0	2	0	0	2	1	4	−3

18 May 2006
Silkeborg	2–0	OB	18:30	Silkeborg Stadion
21 May 2006
OB	1–2	FC Nordsjælland	15:00	Fionia Park
23 May 2006
FC Nordsjælland	0–0	Silkeborg	18:30	Farum Park

=== Group D ===
Team	Pts	Pld	W	D	L	GF	GA	GD
1. F.C. Copenhagen	4	2	1	1	0	6	3	+3
2. FC Midtjylland	2	2	0	2	0	2	2	0
3. AC Horsens	1	2	0	1	1	1	4	−3

18 May 2006
AC Horsens	1–4	F.C. Copenhagen	20:30	Forum Horsens Stadion
21 May 2006
F.C. Copenhagen	2–2	FC Midtjylland	15:00	Parken
23 May 2006
FC Midtjylland	0–0	AC Horsens	18:30	SAS Arena

== Quarterfinals ==
The quarterfinals will be played on 25/26 May and 28/29 May.

Team 1	Agg.	Team 2	1st leg	2nd leg
Brøndby IF (Denmark)	1–6	(Denmark) Esbjerg fB	1–3; 25 May 13:00; Brøndby Stadion	0–3 * 28 May 15:00; Esbjerg Idrætspark
Aalborg BK (Denmark)	5–3	(Denmark) Aarhus GF	3–0; 25 May 15:00; Aalborg Stadion	2–3; 28 May 17:00; NRGi Park
FC Nordsjælland (Denmark)	6–2	(Denmark) F.C. Copenhagen	3–1; 26 May 18:30; Farum Park	3–1; 29 May 18:30; Parken
FC Midtjylland (Denmark)	1–6	(Denmark) Silkeborg IF	0–2; 26 May 20:30; SAS Arena	1–4; 29 May 20:30; Silkeborg Stadion

* The match ended 2–2 but the result was changed to 0–3 in favour of Esbjerg fB because Brøndby IF was using an illegal player.

== Semifinals ==
The semifinals will be played on 1 and 4 June.

Team 1	Agg.	Team 2	1st leg	2nd leg
Esbjerg fB (Denmark)	0–8	(Denmark) Aalborg BK	0–4; 1 June 18:30; Esbjerg Idrætspark	0–4; 4 June 16:00; Aalborg Stadion
FC Nordsjælland (Denmark)	4–0	(Denmark) Silkeborg IF	3–0; 1 June 20:30; Farum Park	1–0; 4 June 18:00; Silkeborg Stadion

== Final ==
The final was played on 7 June.

Aalborg BK (Denmark)	1–3	(Denmark) FC Nordsjælland	7 June	20:30	Aalborg Stadion

== Top goalscorers ==
Pos.	Player	Scored for	Goals
1	Poul Hübertz, AaB	AaB	5
2	Jeppe Curth, AaB	AaB	4
3	Jens Gjesing, AGF	AGF	3
–	Jukka Santala, FCN	FC Nordsjælland	3
–	Martin Bernburg, FCK	F.C. Copenhagen	3
–	Martin Ørnskov Nielsen, SIF	Silkeborg IF	3
–	Morten Friis Jensen, EfB	Esbjerg fB	3
7	Andreas Klarström, EfB	Esbjerg fB	2
–	David Williams, BIF	Brøndby IF	2
–	Fredrik Berglund, EfB	Esbjerg fB	2
–	Njogu Demba-Nyrén, EfB	Esbjerg fB	2
–	Patrick Kristensen, AaB	AaB	2
–	Peter Graulund, AGF	AGF	2
–	Suni Olsen, AaB	AaB	2
–	Tommy Olsen, FCN	FC Nordsjælland	2
