= Lars Jacobsen =

Danish footballer (born 1979)

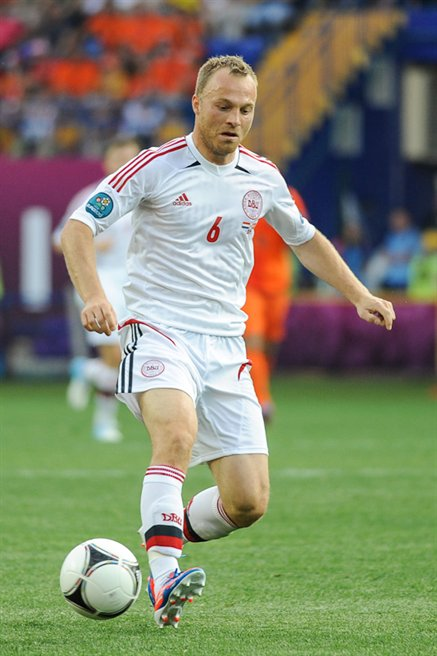
- Jacobsen playing for Denmark at Euro 2012

Personal information
- Full name: Lars Christian Jacobsen
- Date of birth: 20 September 1979 (age 47)
- Place of birth: Odense, Denmark
- Height: 1.81 m (5 ft 11 in)
- Position: Right back

Team information
- Current team: Denmark U18 (assistant)

Senior career*
Years	Team	Apps	(Gls)
1996–2002	OB	112	(2)
2002–2003	Hamburger SV	22	(1)
2004–2007	Copenhagen	103	(3)
2007–2008	1. FC Nürnberg	7	(0)
2008–2009	Everton	5	(0)
2009–2010	Blackburn Rovers	13	(0)
2010–2011	West Ham United	24	(0)
2011–2014	Copenhagen	81	(1)
2014–2016	Guingamp	47	(1)
Total		414	(8)

International career
1995	Denmark U16	2	(0)
1995–1996	Denmark U17	11	(0)
1996–1998	Denmark U19	19	(1)
1998–2001	Denmark U21	26	(0)
2006–2015	Denmark	81	(1)

Managerial career
- 2021–2023: HB Køge (assistant)
- 2023–: Denmark U18 (assistant)
- * Club domestic league appearances and goals

Lars Christian Jacobsen (born 20 September 1979) is a Danish retired professional footballer who played as a right back. He is currently an assistant coach of HB Køge.

During a 20-year playing career, Jacobsen represented the Denmark national football team between 2006 and 2015, and also played abroad for football clubs in Germany, England and France.

== Club career ==
=== Odense Boldklub ===
Born and raised in Odense, Funen, Jacobsen started his career with local top-flight team Odense Boldklub. Prior to joining Odense Boldklub, he attended Sanderum School and once played as a striker before switching position to a defender. His talent was quickly discovered, as he played 58 matches for various youth national teams, and won the 1997 Danish under-19 Player of the Year award. He made his senior debut for OB in the 1996–97 Danish Superliga season.

Jacobsen got his big break-through the following season, when he played 15 first team matches, even though the club was relegated to the 1st Division. He helped the club win promotion the next season. His most notable result with OB came in the 2002 Danish Cup final. OB won 2–0 against defending Superliga champions Copenhagen, and he was named "Cup Fighter" (man of the match) as the club won its first trophy in nine years.

=== Hamburger SV ===
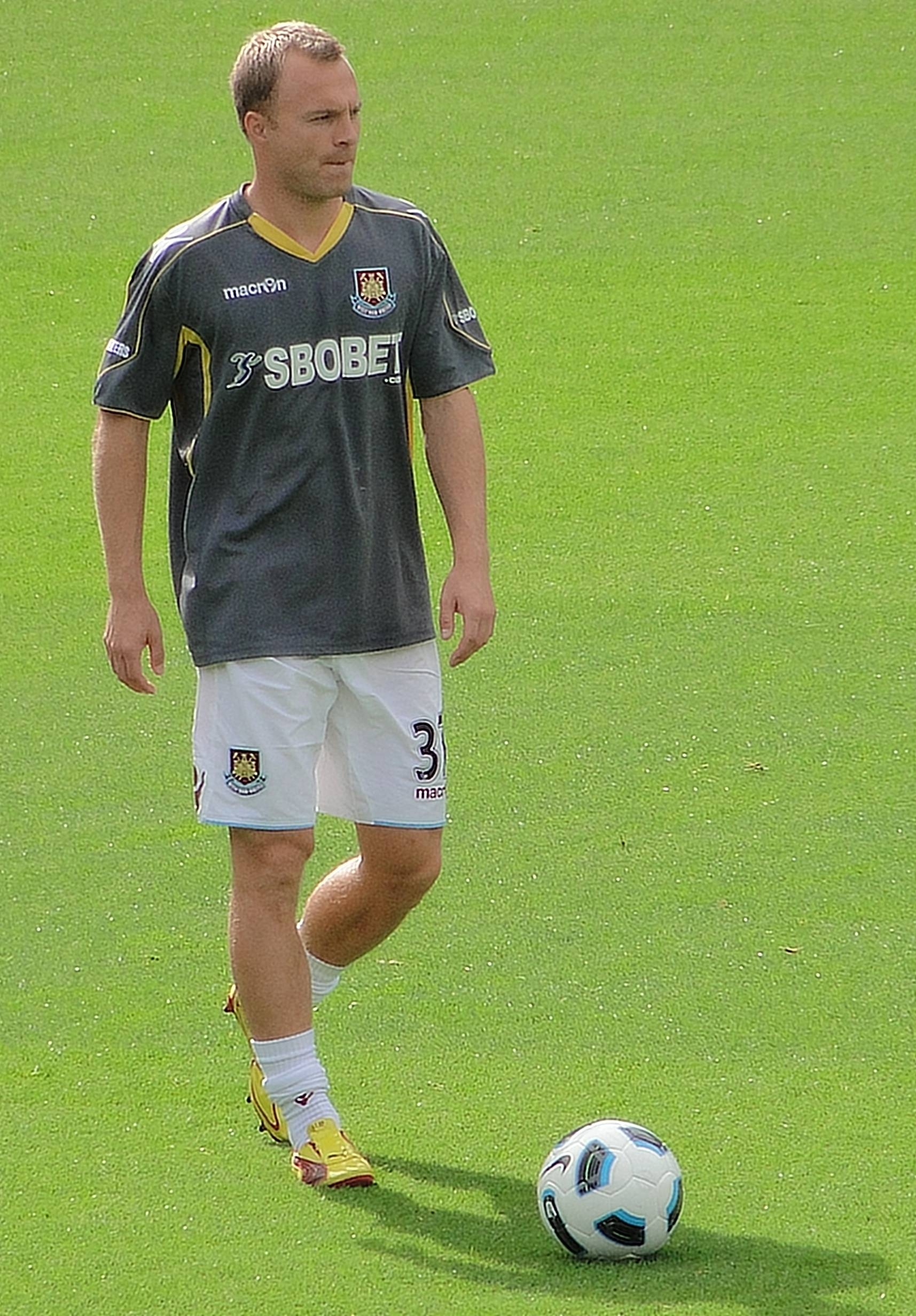
Jacobsen warming up before his West Ham debut game, against Chelsea.

After the cup triumph, Jacobsen moved abroad to play for German club Hamburg on pre-contract, effectively starting from the 2002–03 season.

He made his Hamburger SV debut on 11 September 2002, making first start in a 2–1 loss against Wolfsburg and was featured again, this time in the right midfield position, in a 2–0 win over Kaiserslautern four days later on 15 September 2002. On 10 May 2003, he scored his first goal for the club, in a 4–1 win over Bayer 04 Leverkusen. Jacobsen finished his first season at Hamburger SV having made twelve appearances and scoring once.

However, his second season at Hamburger SV was marked with injury and he spent the first half of the season on the substitute bench, restricting him to ten appearances. In the winter transfer window of 2004, he moved back to Denmark to play for Copenhagen. During his time at Hamburger SV, Jacobsen made 22 appearances and scored one goal.

=== FC Copenhagen ===
His move to FC Copenhagen caused a hostile reaction from OB supporters, causing a strained relationship. Several years on, OB supporters made it very obvious that he would not be welcome back at OB as a result of choosing FC Copenhagen over OB. At FC Copenhagen, he was assigned the number two shirt and he quickly became a part of the starting line-up, playing in different defensive positions. He established himself at right full back, and in FCK's 2005–06 season, he played full-time as the club won the Superliga championship; 2,970 minutes in 33 matches. He was selected by national team coach Morten Olsen for the Danish national team in spring 2006. He made his national team debut on 1 March 2006, and played all 90 minutes of the friendly match against Israel, a 2–0 win. He went on to play eight national team games in a row before Morten Olsen decided to spare the FCK players in November 2006, due to FCK's tough autumn schedule with several games in the international 2006–07 UEFA Champions League tournament. Nevertheless, Jacobsen was nominated for the Danish Football Player of the Year at the end of 2006, but lost out to Christian Poulsen.

Jacobsen was one of several FCK players who gathered international attention in FCK's UEFA Champions League games. A number of European clubs were reportedly interested in buying him, among them Everton, PSG and his former club Hamburger SV. However, in December 2006, he agreed with FCK to stay at the club until his contract ran out, helping the club defend the Superliga championship.

=== 1. FC Nürnberg ===
However, three days later, Jacobsen signed a contract with German club Nürnberg starting from July 2007, giving him a three-year contract until 2010.

On 12 August 2007, he made his debut for the club in a 2–0 loss against Karlsruhe, where he made his first start before coming off in the second half. His stay with the German club was troubled because of injuries and the club also failed to stay in the German Bundesliga. At one point, Jacobsen had to have his four wisdom teeth taken out. Due to injury he played only once in the first half of the season, returning towards the end of the season in a 1–0 win over Wolfsburg on 20 April 2008. He played the last five games of the season on the right of defence, which had been a vulnerable area for the club.

He requested a transfer which was granted in late June 2008. This came after Jacobsen was considering his future and feared for his career after having injuries in groin, knee and back. After his release, French side Olympique de Marseille were keen to sign him. Jacobsen rejected a move to Norwegian side Rosenborg.

=== Everton ===
On 26 August 2008, Jacobsen signed a one-year contract with English Premier League club Everton on a free transfer and was assigned squad number 15. Upon joining Everton, he said the offer from Everton motivated him to join, stating that it was his ambition to join the club by turning down offers from Spain and France.

After missing much of his debut season after injuring his shoulder, Jacobsen made his Premier League debut on 21 March 2009, in an away match against Portsmouth. Following the match, he said he was glad to make his debut and was expected to get more playing time.

On 16 May 2009, Jacobsen played 90 minutes in a 3–1 win against future club West Ham United. He went on to play in the 2009 FA Cup Final, coming on as a substitute at half time for Tony Hibbert where he helped to nullify the threat posed by Florent Malouda down the left wing. Prior the match, he said "It would be a dream come true. When you are a boy, you would like to play at Parken, but to play at Wembley is bigger." Despite making only 6 appearances, Everton were keen to keep Jacobsen, which convinced David Moyes, stating that he deserved a new contract.

=== Blackburn Rovers ===
On 29 June 2009, Jacobsen joined Blackburn Rovers on a two-year deal from Everton. He stated the move was motivated when they offered him a two-year contract and turned down a one-year contract with Everton as a result.

On 15 August 2009, he made his debut for the club in a 2–0 loss against Manchester City. At the end of the 2009–10 season with Blackburn, he had made 15 appearances in all competitions. With a lack of first team opportunities behind Míchel Salgado and Pascal Chimbonda, Jacobsen stated he felt he should get more playing time and that he would not get picked for Denmark in the World Cup if he did not get more playing time.

He made only one appearance in the 2010–11 season, in the League Cup win against Norwich City, on 24 August 2010.

=== West Ham United ===
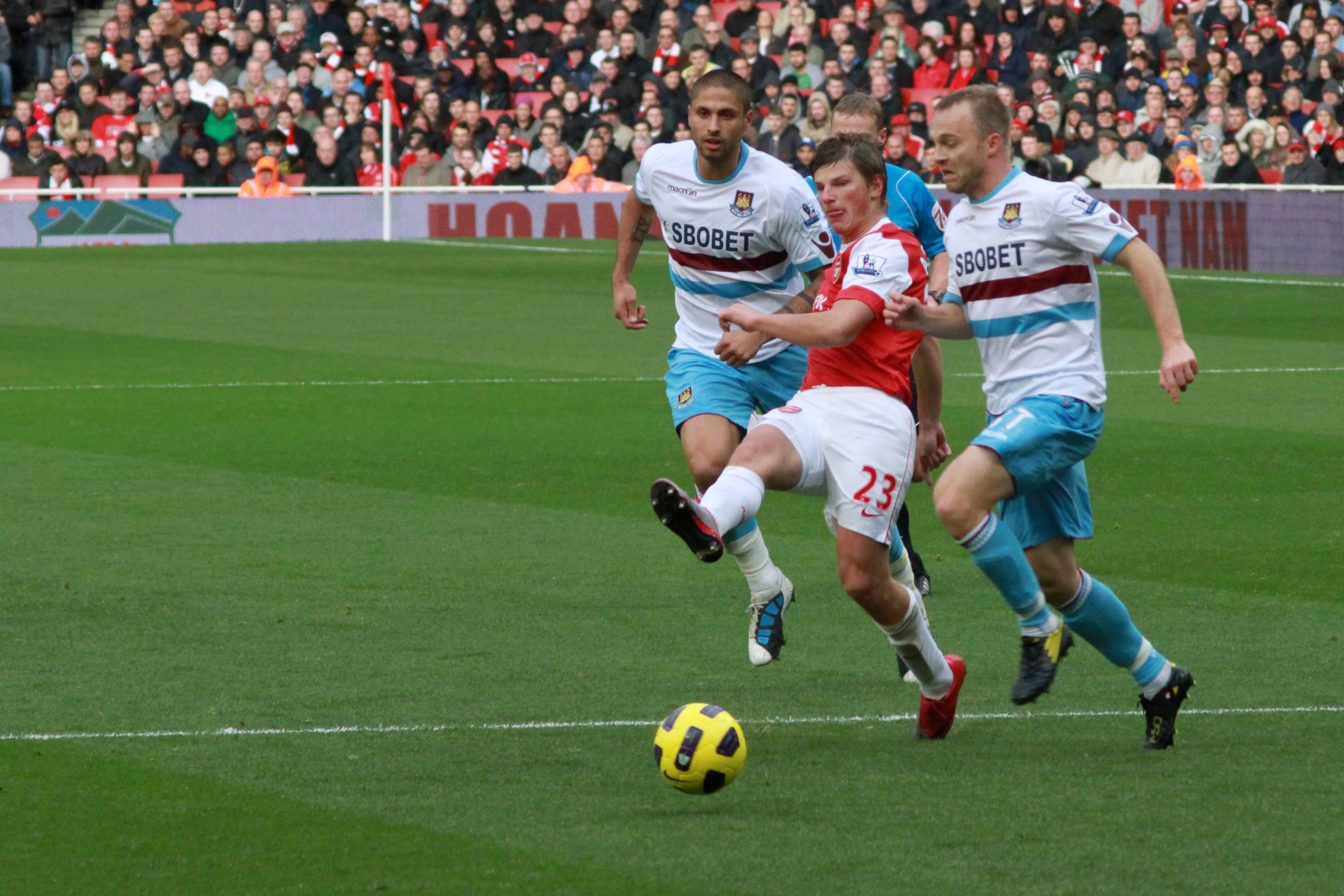
Jacobsen and Manuel da Costa attempted to clear the ball from Andrei Arshavin.

On 31 August 2010, transfer deadline day, Jacobsen signed a one-year contract with West Ham United on a free transfer, the deal being completed on 1 September, at 5.05pm due to paperwork issues between the two football clubs. He made his debut for West Ham on 11 September in a 3–1 home defeat to Chelsea at Upton Park. He was released by West Ham in June 2011. At the end of the 2010–11 season, West Ham United were relegated.

=== Return to FC Copenhagen ===
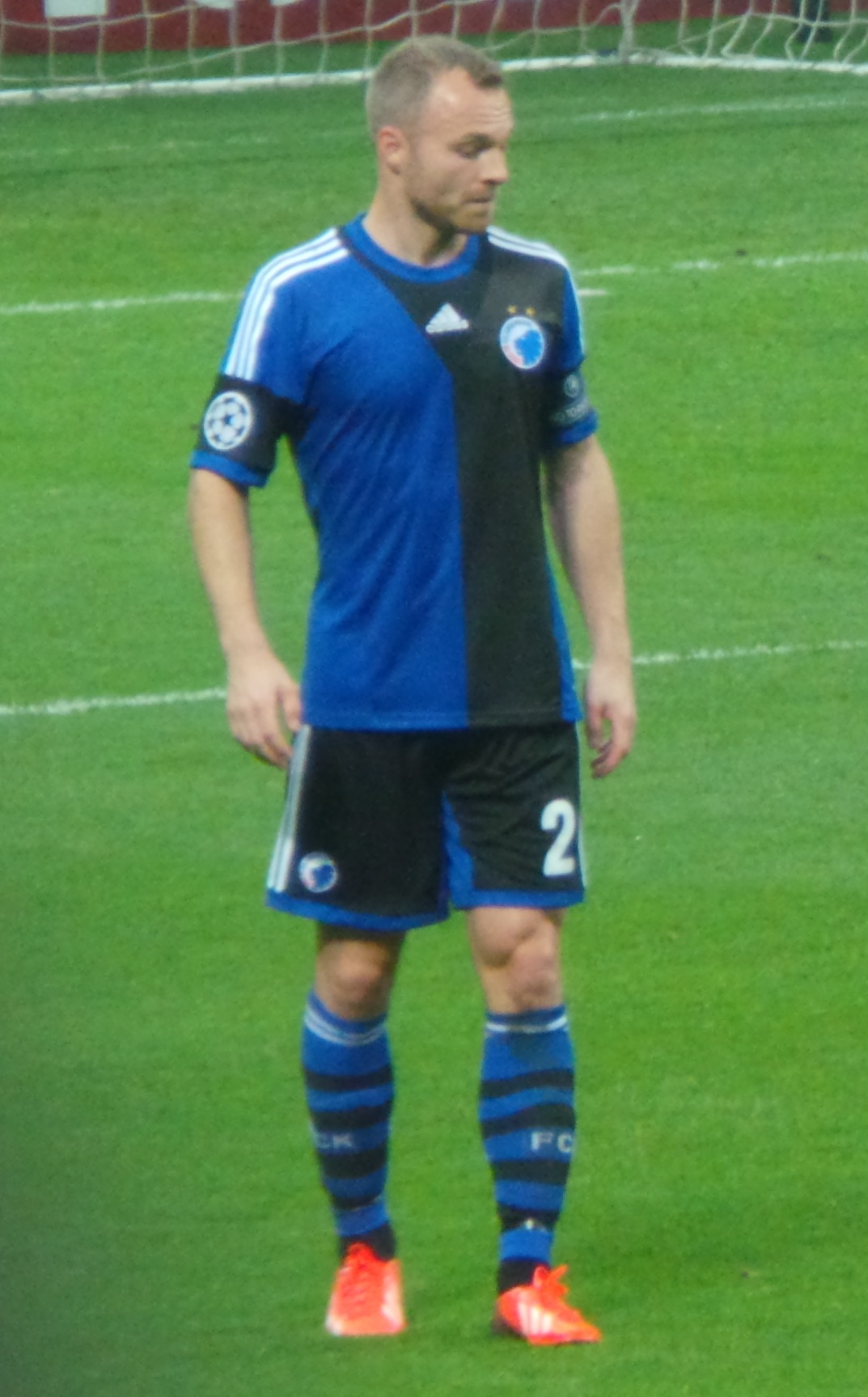
Jacobsen playing for FC Copenhagen.

Following his release by West Ham, Jacobsen was linked with several clubs around Europe despite him being keen to move back to the Danish Superligaen. On 13 September 2011, he was set to join AS Saint-Etienne on a free transfer but on 16 September, Jacobsen opted to join his former club Copenhagen instead and was given number two shirt.

He made his debut for Copenhagen in a 2–0 victory over Aalborg. In a match against AC Horsens, he was injured and feared that his injury could leave him on a sideline for a long time. Fortunately, his injury was not as severe as expected. In his first season, Jacobsen established himself in the right-back position and went on to make twenty-five appearances. Although they failed to win the Superliga as they finished second behind Nordsjælland, they nevertheless managed to win the Danish Cup after beating Horsens 1–0 in the final. During the season, he signed a new contract with the club that would keep him until 2014.

The 2012–13 season saw Jacobsen appointed as a new captain. He provided an assist for César Santin to score the only goal in a 1–0 against Lille in Copenhagen's 1–0 home victory for the play-off round of the Champions League. However, Lille bounced back in the second leg to win 2–0, eliminating Copenhagen. Later in the 2012–13 season, he provided seven assists in 40 appearances in all competitions and went on to play an important role when he led the club to win the Danish Superliga for the tenth time.

The 2013–14 season saw Jacobsen providing four assists in the first ten matches at the start of the season. He scored his first Copenhagen goal of his second spell in a 1–1 draw against Randers on 27 October 2013. He also captained six of the club's matches in the Champions League group stage. Against Juventus on 27 November 2013, he conceded a penalty in a 3–1 loss. However, as the season progressed, he soon lost his first team place to youngster Christoffer Remmer and was demoted to the substitute bench. Jacobsen finished the 2013–14 season making 26 appearances and scoring once. Copenhagen failed to defend their title after losing to Aalborg.

On 11 March 2014, he announced that he was to leave FC Copenhagen at the end of the 2013–14 Superliga season. After stating his intention to leave the club, Jacobsen soon attracted interest across around Europe, which was surprising because he stated that Copenhagen would be his last club before ending his playing career.

=== Guingamp ===
Jacobsen joined Ligue 1 side Guingamp on a two-year contract, which included an extension option.

He made his debut for the club, where he started as a right-back, as Guingamp lost 2–0 to Paris Saint-Germain, in the Trophée des Champions. He made his league debut in the opening game of the season, in a 2–0 loss against Saint-Étienne. At the start of the season, he suffered twice a knee injury. Jacobsen then scored first Guingamp goal on 7 December 2014, in a 3–2 win over Reims. In his first season at Guingamp, he made 25 appearances and scored one goal.

His second season at Guingamp saw him make thirty-two appearances despite being absent from the squad three times due to injuries. Jacobsen subsequently retired at Guingamp after fulfilling his contract at the end of the 2015–16 season, having previously stated it will be his last season. Two days later, on 14 May 2016, Jacobsen made his last appearance of his career, in the last game of the season, in a 3–2 loss against Nice.

== International career ==
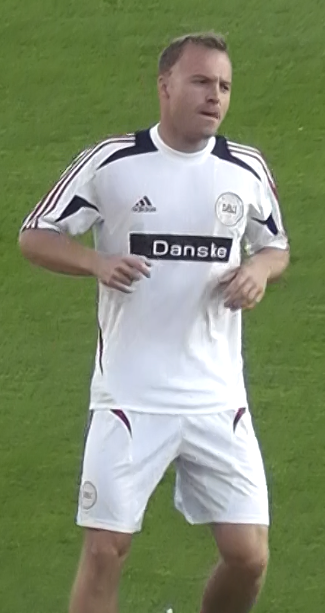
Lars Jacobsen playing for Denmark.

In 1995, Jacobsen made his debut for Denmark at Denmark U16 level. In subsequent years, he represented national youth sides in various age categories: U17 (11 games), U19 (19 games, 1 goal) and U21 (26 games).

Jacobsen did not make his senior team debut until the 2006 friendly 2–0 win against Israel. He scored his first and only Denmark national goal in a 4–1 win over Cyprus in the Euro 2012 qualifier on 7 October 2011.

Under Morten Olsen, Jacobsen became a regular member of Denmark's first eleven and was part of Denmark's squads for World Cup 2010 and Euro 2012. He retired from the national team after Denmark missed qualification for Euro 2016.

=== International goals ===
Scores and results list Denmark's goal tally first.

#	Date	Venue	Opponent	Score	Result	Competition
1.	7 October 2011	Nicosia, Cyprus	Cyprus	1–0	4–1	Euro 2012 qualifier

== Personal life ==
In late 2009, Jacobsen became a father.

== Coaching career ==
On 31 March 2021, it was confirmed that Jacobsen and former teammate and Danish international player, Daniel Agger, would take charge of Danish 1st Division club HB Køge, affective from 1 July 2021.

On 5 of September 2023 DBU announced Jacobsen will be new assistant coach for Denmark national under-18 football team.

== Honours ==
Odense

- Danish 1st Division: 1998–99
- Danish Cup: 2001–02

Hamburger SV

- DFL-Ligapokal: 2003

FC Copenhagen

- Danish Superliga: 2003–04, 2005–06, 2006–07, 2012–13
- Danish Cup: 2003–04, 2011–12
- Royal League: 2004–05, 2005–06
- Danish Super Cup: 2004

Everton

- FA Cup runner-up: 2008–09

Individual

- Danish under-19 Player of the Year: 1997
- Danish Cup Fighter: 2001
- Danish Team of the Year: 2005, 2006

Sporting positions
Preceded by Mathias "Zanka" Jørgensen	F.C. Copenhagen captain 2012–2014	Succeeded by Thomas Delaney
