= Anders Linderoth =

Swedish football coach and former player (born 1950)

Personal information
- Full name: Anders Karl Gustaf Linderoth
- Date of birth: 21 March 1950 (age 76)
- Place of birth: Kristianstad, Sweden
- Height: 1.70 m (5 ft 7 in)
- Position: Midfielder

Youth career
- 1955–1961: Näsby IF
- 1962–1966: Stattena IF

Senior career*
Years	Team	Apps	(Gls)
1967	Stattena IF		
1968–1970	Hälsingborgs	61	(7)
1971–1977	Östers IF	158	(23)
1977–1980	Marseille	84	(6)
1980–1981	Mjällby AIF	22	(0)
1982–1984	Näsby IF		

International career
1972–1980	Sweden	40	(2)

Managerial career
- 1985–1989: Mjällby AIF
- 1995–1997: IF Elfsborg
- 1998–2001: Stabæk
- 2002–2006: Hammarby
- 2007: Viborg FF
- 2008–2009: Landskrona BoIS
- 2014–2015: Mjällby AIF
- * Club domestic league appearances and goals

Anders Karl Gustaf Linderoth (born 21 March 1950) is a Swedish football coach and former player who played as a midfielder. He is best remembered for representing Helsingborgs IF, Östers IF, Marseille, and Mjällby AIF during a club career that spanned between 1967 and 1984. A full international between 1972 and 1980, he won 40 caps and scored two goals for the Sweden national team and represented his country at the 1978 FIFA World Cup. He was awarded Guldbollen in 1976 as Sweden's best player of the year.

== Club career ==
He debuted in Allsvenskan for Helsingborg, and during his spell with Östers IF he made his national team debut and received Guldbollen. In 1977, he moved to play professionally in Marseille.

== International career ==
He played 40 matches and scored two goals for Sweden, the tally including three matches at the 1978 FIFA World Cup in Argentina.

== Post-playing career ==
After retiring as a football player Linderoth has worked as a coach. His achievements include leading IF Elfsborg to Allsvenskan. From 2001 until 2006 he coached Hammarby. Linderoth managed Viborg in about eleven months in 2007.

== Personal life ==
Anders Linderoth is the father of former Sweden national team player Tobias Linderoth.

== Honours ==
Individual

- Guldbollen: 1977
