= Thomas Røll =

Danish footballer

Personal information
- Full name: Thomas Christopher Røll Larsen
- Date of birth: 12 March 1977 (age 49)
- Place of birth: Aarhus, Denmark
- Height: 1.84 m (6 ft 0 in)
- Position: Midfielder

Team information
- Current team: Silkeborg U19; Denmark U-18 (assistant)

Youth career
- Bylderup Bov
- Tønder

Senior career*
Years	Team	Apps	(Gls)
1996–2001	Silkeborg	152	(12)
2001–2006	Copenhagen	97	(20)
2005	→ Silkeborg (loan)	11	(0)
2006–2008	Midtjylland	18	(2)
2008	→ Vejle (loan)	27	(1)
2009	Viborg	7	(2)
2011–2018	Kjellerup	?	(?)
Total		312	(37)

International career
1996–1997	Denmark U19	2	(0)
1997–1999	Denmark U21	7	(1)
2002–2004	Denmark	8	(1)

Managerial career
- 2017–2018: Kjellerup (player-assistant)
- 2018–2020: Skive
- 2021–2026: Silkeborg (transition coach)
- 2022–: Denmark U18 (assistant)
- 2026–: Silkeborg U19
- * Club domestic league appearances and goals

Thomas Christopher Røll Larsen (born 12 March 1977) is a Danish retired professional footballer. He played 293 games in the Danish Superliga with Silkeborg IF, F.C. Copenhagen, FC Midtjylland, and Vejle Boldklub. He won the international 1996 Intertoto Cup and a Danish Cup trophy with Silkeborg IF as well as three Superliga championships with F.C. Copenhagen. He also played eight matches for the Danish national team, scoring once.

== Club career ==
=== Silkeborg IF ===
Born in Aarhus, Røll also lived on Funen, before he started playing football in Bylderup Bov near the Danish-German border. He was accepted into the youth academy of Silkeborg IF, and went on to play for a local club in Tønder, before moving to Silkeborg in autumn 1994. At Silkeborg's youth academy, Røll played alongside future Danish international defender Martin Laursen. Røll began his senior career as a forward for Silkeborg under manager Preben Elkjær, who believed Røll lacked only temper to become a star in Danish football. Røll debuted in the top-flight Danish Superliga championship in May 1996, and was a part of the Silkeborg team which won the international 1996 UEFA Intertoto Cup competition, beating Croatian team HNK Segesta in the final games.

Røll quickly established himself in the first team, and played 29 of 33 league games during the 1996–97 Superliga season. He played six seasons for Silkeborg IF, and eventually settled as the playmaker of the team. In his position of deep-lying forward, he especially experienced a successful striking partnership with Henrik Pedersen. He helped Silkeborg win silver medals in the 1997–98 Superliga and bronze medals in the 2000–01 Superliga season, as well as the 2001 Danish Cup trophy.

=== F.C. Copenhagen ===
In June 2001, the financially struggling Silkeborg IF sold Røll to the defending Danish champions F.C. Copenhagen (FCK) in a transfer deal reportedly worth DKK 7 million. Røll signed a five-year contract, and the move was seen as an opportunity for Røll to attract the attention of clubs abroad, with Silkeborg getting a part of the future transfer earnings. He predominantly played on the flanks for FCK, and only occasionally got the chance to play in his familiar deep-lying forward position, as when he scored two goals against Aarhus GF in October 2001. Røll played five seasons at FCK, and helped the club win three Danish Superliga championships. Initially an important part of the FCK first team, a number of injuries caused him to play fewer and fewer games for the club.

Røll suffered an injured Achilles tendon in March 2004, returned to the FCK squad at the start of the 2004–05 Superliga season in July 2004, but suffered another injury in October 2004. He had a hard time re-entering the FCK starting line-up, and was loaned out to his former club Silkeborg IF in February 2005. He played the second half of the 2004–05 Superliga season for Silkeborg, helping the club avoid relegation. Back in FCK, Røll injured his ankle in July 2005, and was soon out of the FCK starting line-up.

=== Last years ===
With his FCK contract expiring in the summer 2006, he moved to league rivals FC Midtjylland (FCM) on a free transfer. Røll suffered another injury before playing any games for FCM, and underwent rehabilitation until January 2007. He played 18 Superliga games for FCM, before moving on loan to Danish 1st Division team Vejle BK. He made his Vejle debut in March 2008, and helped the club win promotion for the Superliga. His loan deal was extended by another six months, and he played 15 of 17 games for Vejle in the first half of the 2008–09 Superliga season. He pleaded for FCM to let him stay in Vejle at the end of his loan. In February 2009, he was bought by 1st Division team Viborg FF on 2 February 2009, and signed a contract until the summer 2010. Viborg were forced to make economical cuts in the summer 2009, and Røll chose to end his career after 14 years in professional football.

== International career ==
While at Silkeborg, Røll was called up for the Danish under-21 national team in February 1997, at the age of 19. He scored a goal in his debut against the Israel under-21s; in a game the Denmark under-21s won 2–1.

While at FCK, Røll made his Danish national team debut under national manager Morten Olsen in October 2002. On November 20, 2002, he became the first non-white player ever to score for Denmark. In March 2004, Røll played a national team match despite suffering a sore Achilles tendon. The Achilles tendon subsequently needed surgery, which caused Røll three months of rehabilitation, and he was dropped from the national team.

== Honours ==
Silkeborg

- Intertoto Cup: 1996
- Danish Cup: 2001

Copenhagen

- Danish Superliga: 2003, 2004, 2006
- Danish Super Cup: 2001, 2004
