= Michael Gravgaard =

Danish footballer (born 1978)

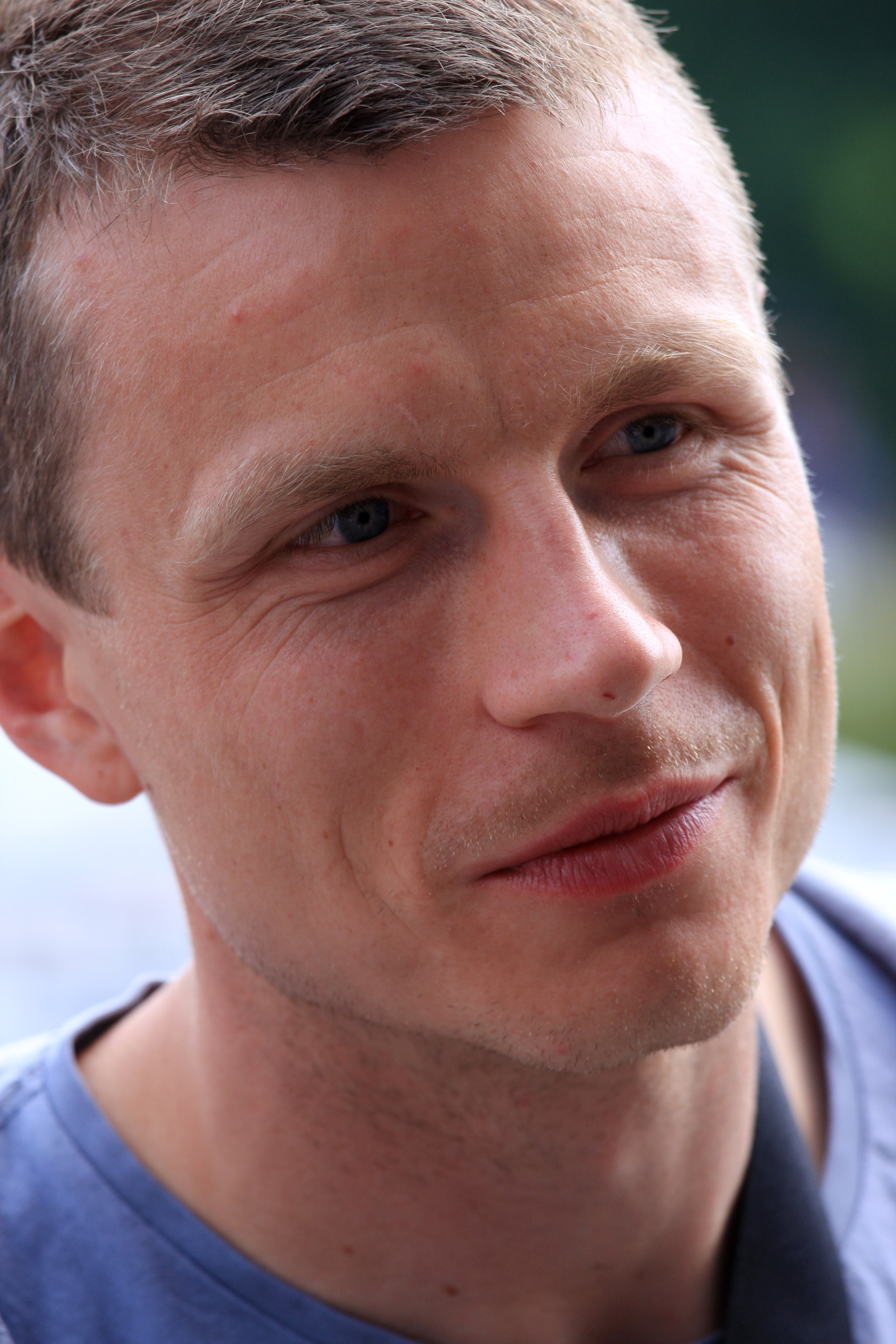
- Gravgaard in 2009

Personal information
- Full name: Michael Julius Gravgaard
- Date of birth: 3 April 1978 (age 48)
- Place of birth: Spentrup, Denmark
- Height: 1.88 m (6 ft 2 in)
- Position: Centre back

Youth career
- Spentrup
- Randers Freja

Senior career*
Years	Team	Apps	(Gls)
1996–2002	Randers Freja	118	(11)
2002–2005	Viborg	94	(18)
2005–2008	Copenhagen	79	(6)
2008–2010	Nantes	14	(0)
2009	→ Hamburger SV (loan)	12	(0)
Total		317	(35)

International career
2005–2007	Denmark	18	(5)
- * Club domestic league appearances and goals

Michael Julius Gravgaard (born 3 April 1978) is a Danish former professional footballer who played as a centre back. He began his career at Randers Freja. During his stay at Viborg, he occasionally played as a forward. With Copenhagen, he won the league title twice. His international career took place from August 2005 until September 2007, during which he played 18 matches and scored five goals for the Denmark national team. He effectively ended his playing career at Nantes in May 2010. Despite the fact of having a contract with Nantes until July 2011, the club were not interested to honour the contract, and opted instead in May 2010, to try to file him as "lifetime injured" towards their insurance company. When this attempt ultimately got unapproved by the French authorities, and Gravgaard had passed all additional health checks, the club then opted in January 2011, to dismiss him permanently from the club – a half year prematurely. Forced by that, Gravgaard announced in January 2011, that he would now end his active playing career for good, and that he would continue – at least for the next half year – to work as a football commentator, pundit and analyst at the Danish TV channel Canal 9.

== Club career ==
=== Early career ===
Born in Spentrup, eight kilometres north of Randers, Gravgaard started his senior career with local club Randers Freja in 1996. Initially playing in the lower-league Danish 2nd Division, Gravgaard helped the club win promotion to the 1st Division in 1999. He entered the Danish top-flight football relatively late in his career, as he foremost wished to pursue an academic career. Only after graduating as an accountant, Gravgaard signed a contract in the top-flight Danish Superliga championship, when he moved to Viborg in July 2002.

=== Viborg ===
At Viborg, he established himself as one of the best central defenders in the Superliga, and he was at times used, with relative success, as a striker. In his three seasons at Viborg, he appeared in 94 league games for the club and he scored 18 goals. In the summer break 2005, Gravgaard moved on to league rivals Copenhagen (FCK), alongside Viborg's goalkeeper Jesper Christiansen.

=== Copenhagen (FCK) ===
He quickly established himself among the key players of FCK, and due to his heading ability, he soon earned the nickname of "Copenhagen Air Force" among the FCK fans. In the January 2007 transfer window, he was linked with a move to the English Premier League, where both Newcastle United and West Ham United were rumoured to offer him a contract. None of the rumours were however converted to a transfer, and so he continued to play for FCK until July 2008.

=== Nantes ===
On 6 July 2008, he signed a contract for three years with Viborg in the French Ligue 1. In the first half of the 2008–09 season, he played for Nantes in 14 games of Ligue 1. Performance wise, the first 14 games of the season was unfortunately very bad for the club with: eight defeats, three draws and three wins. For the next eight games, the coach decided not to offer anymore playing time for Gravgaard. In January 2009, he then agreed with the club, that he was free to sign a loan contract with another club, in case any offers would arrive.

=== Loan to Hamburger SV ===
In response to the long-term injury of Bastian Reinhardt, the Hamburger SV decided to sign a half year loan contract from 1 February to 30 June, with Michael Gravgaard. During spring 2009, he played for the club in 12 Bundesliga games, seven Europa League games, and one German Cup game. He managed together with Hamburger SV to reach the semifinal in both the Europa League and German Cup; but in both cases the club was unfortunate to be kicked out of the tournament by the Bundesliga rivals from Werder Bremen.

=== Return to Nantes ===
When he returned from his loan contract to Nantes in July 2009, he agreed to have an operation of his toe done. In the previous year, he had been playing with a lot of pain from his toe, due to chronic tendonitis, and the operation was believed to cure the problem. Unfortunately, the operation failed, and he therefore agreed to have a second operation in December 2009. The second operation left him with a "stiff toe", but succeeded to remove the pain. By the end of March 2010, he was ready to play football games again, but for the remaining part of the season he was never given a chance for a comeback. Instead, the club decided in May 2010 to try to file him as having a lifetime injury to their insurance company.

In August 2010, the filing of Gravgaard as "lifetime injured" was approved by La Médecine du Travail (the department for Occupational Health, under the French ministry for Labour). This decision was appealed by Gravgaard, however, as he was convinced not to have any physical problems that could force him to stop his football career. On 16 September, he won the appeal, and regained the legal right to continue his football career. When he asked Nantes to accept his return on the training field, the club however also required him to first pass a series of additional medical tests. Gravgaard at the same time announced, that he most likely would pass all the tests, but that he felt his future prospects anyway were rather bad. Because, earlier in 2010, Nantes had told him not to count on anymore playing time for the first team of the club. And when he then asked them, for an agreement where he instead could be released from his ongoing contract, with the purpose of becoming entirely free to seek a new contract with another club, they had also refused. By the time of September 2010, the only hope Gravgaard therefore had was that Nantes would change their mind, and allow him to leave the club for free, which would make it possible for him to sign a contract with a new club, where he could play for the remaining part of his career.

Four months later, when he had passed all additional medical tests, he once again tried to show up at the training field. This time, however, he now got the message that he had been permanently dismissed from the club. As Gravgaard had an ongoing contract with Nantes until July 2011, and did not receive any salary since May 2010, he consequently opted to launch a court case against the club, with a final ruling due to arrive in June 2011. After being dismissed by Nantes, Gravgaard announced in January 2011 that he would now end his active playing career for good, and that he would continue – at least for the next half year, to work as a football commentator, pundit and analyst at the Danish TV channel Canal 9.

== International career ==
Gravgaard was selected for the Denmark national team in August 2005. He played the second half, coming on as a substitute for Per Nielsen, and scored the goal to 3–0, in a 4–1 friendly match win against England. Gravgaard played his first full international match on 7 September 2005, against Georgia. In the following two games against Greece and Kazakhstan, he scored a goal in each match. The start of his national team career thus featured three goals in five games, an impressive tally for a central defender.

On 2 June 2007, Gravgaard stopped the attacking fan from reaching referee Herbert Fandel in the 2008 UEFA qualifier fan attack in an international match against Sweden which was subsequently abandoned. He played his latest and 18th game for the national team in September 2007.

== International goals ==
Scores and results list Denmark's goal tally first, score column indicates score after each Gravgaard goal.

List of international goals scored by Michael Gravgaard
No.	Date	Venue	Opponent	Score	Result	Competition
1	17 August 2005	Copenhagen, Denmark	England	3–0	4–1	Friendly match
2	8 October 2005	Copenhagen, Denmark	Greece	1–0	1–0	World Cup 2006 qualification
3	12 October 2005	Almaty, Kazakhstan	Kazakhstan	1–0	2–1	World Cup 2006 qualification
4	11 October 2006	Vaduz, Liechtenstein	Liechtenstein	2–0	4–0	Euro 2008 qualification
5	24 March 2007	Madrid, Spain	Spain	1–2	1–2	Euro 2008 qualification

== Honours ==
Randers Freja

- Danish 2nd Division: 1998–99

F.C. Copenhagen

- Danish Superliga: 2005–06 and 2006–07
- Royal League: 2005–06

Individual

- 2005 Danish Superliga profile (by the Superliga managers)
- 2005 Danish profile of the year (by the player association)
- 2005 Danish team of the year (by the player association)
- 2006 Danish Superliga autumn profile (by Tipsbladet)
- 2006 Danish profile of the year (by the player association)
- 2006 Danish team of the year (by the player association)
