= Danish League Cup =

Football competition in Denmark

- Sport: Football
- Founded: 2005
- Folded: 2006
- No. of teams: 3
- Country: Denmark
- Most titles: Brøndby IF

The Danish League Cup, was a football competition, arranged by Divisionsforeningen, for all the top level Danish football teams. The competition has existed in various formats, with the exact name of the league depending on the sponsor. For instance, the Danish League Cup was named Carlsberg Grand Prix in 1984, where Brøndby IF won the trophy. While the name changed to Spar Cup in 1996, where FC Copenhagen won the trophy. The last time the League Cup was organised as an official tournament was apparently in 1996. It shortly reappeared in 2005-2006, as the tournament known as Tele2 LigaCup. Games played in the Tele2 LigaCup were however not counted as official matches by the Danish Football Association, as the matches were only played with one regular half (45 minutes). The Tele2 LigaCup also had a limited representation of clubs, as the format was just a round-robin tournament between the top 3 finishers of the Danish Superliga.

== Selected finals ==
Year	Winning team	Runners up	Losing team	Venue
2005	Brøndby IF	FC Midtjylland	F.C. Copenhagen	Brøndby Stadion
2006	Brøndby IF	F.C. Copenhagen	Viborg FF	Farum Park

=== Total titles ===
Titles	Team
2	Brøndby IF
