= 2005–06 Danish Superliga =

16th season of Danish Superliga

SAS Ligaen
- Season: 2005-06
- Champions: F.C. Copenhagen
- Relegated: SønderjyskE; Aarhus GF

The 2005–06 Danish Superliga season was the 16th season of the Danish Superliga league championship, governed by the Danish Football Association. It took place from the first match on July 19, 2005 to the final match on May 14, 2006.

FC København will, as Danish champions, qualify for UEFA Champions League 2006-07 qualification and the Royal League 2006-07. Brøndby IF will, as runners-up, qualify for UEFA Cup 2006-07 qualification and Royal League. Odense BK will, as 3rd placed, qualify for the UEFA Intertoto Cup 2006 and Royal League, while Viborg FF, as the 4th placed team, just qualify for Royal League. SønderjyskE and AGF relegated to the 1st Division. The 1st Division champions and runners-up will promote to the Superliga.

== Participants ==
Club	Finishing position last season	First season in top division	First season of current spell in top division
Aalborg BK	4th	1928-29	1987
Aarhus GF	9th	1927-28	1977
AC Horsens	2nd in 1st Division	1929-30	2005-06
Brøndby IF	1st	1982	1982
Esbjerg fB	5th	1928-29	2001-02
FC København	2nd	1992-93	1992-93
FC Midtjylland	3rd	2000-01	2000-01
FC Nordsjælland	10th	2002-03	2002-03
Odense BK	6th	1927-28	1999-00
Silkeborg IF	8th	1988	2004-05
Sønderjyske	1st in 1st Division	2000-01	2005-06
Viborg FF	7th	1927-28	1998-99

== Table ==
Pos	Team	Pld	W	D	L	GF	GA	GD	Pts	Qualification or relegation
1	Copenhagen (C)	33	22	7	4	62	27	+35	73	Qualification to Champions League second qualifying round and Royal League
2	Brøndby	33	21	4	8	60	32	+28	67	Qualification to UEFA Cup first qualifying round and Royal League
3	OB	33	17	7	9	49	28	+21	58	Qualification to Intertoto Cup second round and Royal League
4	Viborg FF	33	15	9	9	62	43	+19	54	Qualification to Royal League
5	AaB	33	11	12	10	48	44	+4	45	
6	Esbjerg fB	33	12	6	15	43	45	−2	42	
7	Midtjylland	33	10	11	12	42	52	−10	41	
8	Silkeborg IF	33	11	6	16	33	51	−18	39	
9	Nordsjælland	33	9	11	13	49	55	−6	38	
10	AC Horsens	33	8	13	12	29	41	−12	37	
11	Sønderjyske (R)	33	6	8	19	41	72	−31	26	Relegation to Danish 1st Division
12	AGF (R)	33	4	10	19	36	63	−27	22	Relegation to Danish 1st Division

Rules for classification: 1) points; 2) goal difference; 3) number of goals scored.
(C) Champions; (R) Relegated

== Results ==
Home \ Away	ACH	AGF	BIF	EFB	FCK	FCM	FCN	OB	SIF	SØN	VFF	AAB	ACH	AGF	BIF	EFB	FCK	FCM	FCN	OB	SIF	SØN	VFF	AAB
AC Horsens		1–1	0–0	1–0	0–1	3–4	0–0	0–0	0–0	2–0	0–3	0–0		2–1	4–1					0–0			3–1	0–1
AGF	0–1		3–0	2–2	0–4	1–2	0–2	0–4	2–0	1–1	2–3	2–4			0–1				1–3	0–2			3–3	1–1
Brøndby IF	4–1	4–0		3–0	1–1	3–0	2–1	1–0	2–0	3–0	1–0	3–1					3–0	5–0	3–1		3–1	1–2		4–3
Esbjerg fB	0–0	0–1	2–3		3–1	2–0	4–0	2–2	4–0	3–2	1–4	2–1	1–1		0–0					1–0	2–0		3–2	
FC Copenhagen	2–0	1–1	0–0	5–1		3–1	3–3	1–1	2–0	4–1	2–1	1–0	1–0	1–1		2–1		2–0			2–3		3–1	
FC Midtjylland	2–1	3–3	2–0	2–1	1–3		1–1	0–1	1–0	2–2	1–1	2–4	0–0	2–0		0–0				1–2	0–2		0–1	
FC Nordsjælland	5–0	3–1	0–2	2–0	1–2	3–2		0–3	2–2	1–1	1–3	0–1	3–0			0–2	1–1	2–2				4–2		
Odense BK	3–0	3–1	1–3	1–0	0–2	0–1	0–0		3–1	2–3	3–0	2–1			0–1		1–0		2–0		2–1	3–0		0–2
Silkeborg IF	0–1	2–1	2–0	2–1	0–3	0–0	1–1	1–0		3–2	1–1	1–4	2–1	1–0					2–0			0–1	1–3	
SønderjyskE	1–3	2–1	1–2	0–1	0–1	2–4	2–2	2–4	2–0		0–4	2–2	1–1	1–0		1–3	1–4	0–2						
Viborg FF	1–1	2–2	3–1	1–0	0–1	1–1	3–1	1–2	2–3	3–1		2–0			2–0				4–1	2–2		1–1		2–0
AaB	2–2	1–1	3–0	2–0	0–1	1–1	1–1	0–0	1–1	3–2	1–1					1–0	0–2	2–2	2–4		1–0	2–2		

Source: Danskfodbold.com

== Top goalscorers ==
Pos	Player	Club	Goals
1	(Denmark) Steffen Højer	Viborg FF	16
2	(Sweden) Marcus Allbäck	FC København	15
2	(Brazil) Álvaro Santos	FC København	15
2	(Denmark) Mads Junker	FC Nordsjælland	15
5	(Sweden) Fredrik Berglund	Esbjerg fB	14
6	(Brazil) José Mota	Viborg FF	12
6	(Sweden) Johan Elmander	Brøndby IF	12
8	(Albania) Besart Berisha	AC Horsens	11
8	(Denmark) Peter Sand	SønderjyskE	11
8	(Denmark) Morten Rasmussen	AGF/Brøndby IF	11

== Attendances ==
No.	Club	Average	Highest
1	FC København	21,552	41,201
2	Brøndby IF	16,136	29,298
3	OB	8,195	15,305
4	AGF	7,323	10,456
5	FC Midtjylland	7,193	10,505
6	Esbjerg fB	6,902	9,865
7	AaB	6,823	11,419
8	Viborg FF	5,141	9,353
9	AC Horsens	3,997	6,959
10	SønderjyskE	3,864	8,302
11	Silkeborg IF	3,665	5,710
12	FC Nordsjælland	3,504	9,118

== See also ==
- 2005-06 in Danish football
