= 2006–07 F.C. Copenhagen season =

F.C. Copenhagen
2006–07 season
- Chairman: Flemming Østergaard
- Manager: Ståle Solbakken
- Danish Superliga: 1st
- Danish Cup: Runner-up
- UEFA Champions League: 4th in group stage
- Royal League: Runner-up
- Top goalscorer: League: Marcus Allbäck (11); All: Fredrik Berglund (18)
- Highest home attendance: 40,463 (vs Brøndby IF, 1 October 2006)
- Lowest home attendance: 6,642 (vs Helsingborgs IF, 8 March 2007)

F.C. Copenhagen won the Danish Superliga trophy and competed in UEFA Champions League in the season 2006-07. The championship was secured on 9 May 2007 after winning 1–0 at Brøndby Stadion against arch rivals Brøndby IF.

On August 23, Copenhagen qualified for the UEFA Champions League as the first Danish team since 1998 after eliminating Ajax 3–2 on aggregate. In the group stage, they finished last in their group despite earning seven points.

Copenhagen lost the finals in both the Royal League and Danish Cup against Brøndby and Odense Boldklub respectively.

== Competitions ==
For the 2006–07 season, Copenhagen competed in the Danish Superliga, Danish Cup, UEFA Champions League and Royal League.

=== Danish Superliga ===
In the Superliga they were at the winter break placed first, with only one defeat and four draws after 18 matches. Their biggest wins was with 3–0 against Viborg FF and Vejle Boldklub at Parken on respectively 22 and October 29.

The only autumn defeat was against Aalborg BK on August 27, where they lost 2–0 at Parken.

On 5 May 2007 they got their second defeat, again against Aalborg BK at Parken. That match ended 1–2. Their final loss was 19 days later against Esbjerg fB home with 1–2.

The championship was secured on May 9 after winning 1–0 at Brøndby Stadion against arch rivals Brøndby IF.

In season's last match, on 27 May, Copenhagen played a 0–0 draw against already-relegated Vejle at Vejle Stadion.

=== Danish Cup ===
See also 2006–07 Danish Cup

In the Danish Cup, Copenhagen began in the third round against Thisted FC at Lerpytter Stadion. Copenhagen won 4–1 on penalty shootout following a 1–1 draw after full-time. Hjalte Nørregaard scored for FCK and Daniel Kristensen scored for Thisted.

In the fourth round, Copenhagen played at home against Esbjerg fB, winning 3–1. Former FCK player Jesper Bech scored for Esbjerg after four minutes, but Fredrik Berglund and Hjalte Nørregaard scored the three goals for FCK in front of 10,000 spectators at Parken Stadium.

In the quarter-finals, FC Midtjylland awaited at SAS Arena in Herning. After 90 minutes, the scoreline was 2–2, after FCK-goals by Fredrik Berglund and Dan Thomassen and in the extra time Brede Hangeland made it 3–2 for FCK.

In the semi-finals the opponent was 1st Division leaders Lyngby Boldklub. The first match at Lyngby Stadion ended with a 3–2 win for FCK, where Berglund had scored twice, and Nørregaard score 6 minutes before full-time. The second leg at Parken was a display of skills as FCK won 4–0; Aílton José Almeida, Fredrik Berglund and Hjalte Nørregaard scored for FCK, while the goal for 2–0 was an own goal by Lyngby debutant Brian Hämäläinen.

In the final Odense Boldklub was waiting, and Michael Hemmingsen's troops showed that FCK still had a hangover after the championship was secured 8 days earlier. The match ended 1–2, although Atiba Hutchinson made it 1–0 for FCK after 15 minutes.

=== UEFA Champions League ===
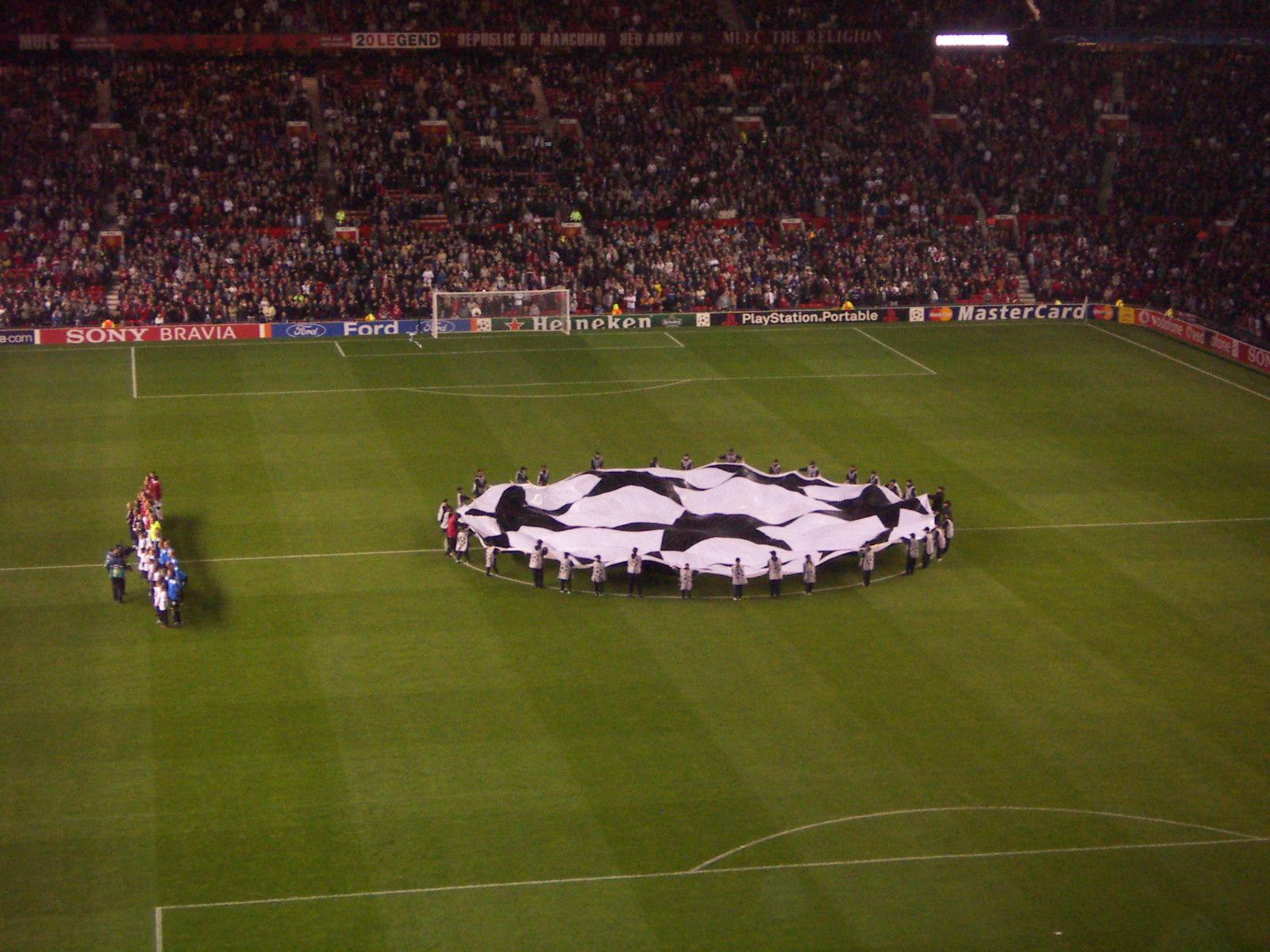
Man Utd v FC Copenhagen

See also 2006–07 UEFA Champions League

In the Champions League, FCK started in the 2nd qualifying round, where they faced Finnish MyPa. First match was played at Parken Stadium, and FCK won 2–0 after goals by André Bergdølmo, a penalty kick, and Michael Gravgaard. The return match were played at Saviniemi, and that match ended 2–2 after goals by Fredrik Berglund, Eero Peltonen (MyPa), Tobias Linderoth and Saku Puhakainen (MyPa). FCK went through to next round with 4–2 agg.

In the third qualifying round, Dutch side Ajax Amsterdam was waiting, but after a strong start, FCK lost 1–2 at home ground Parken Stadium, after goals by Ajax's Klaas-Jan Huntelaar (twice) and FCK's Brede Hangeland. In the return match at Amsterdam ArenA on August 23 FC Copenhagen turned the tie around by defeating Ajax 0–2, including an own goal by Thomas Vermaelen, and thereby qualifying for the UEFA Champions League group stage with a 3–2 aggregate scoreline.

The draw was made on August 24 and FCK came out of the hat in Group F along with Manchester United, Benfica & Celtic.

The first group stage match were against Benfica at Parken Stadium. That match ended with a 0–0 draw. The second match were played at Celtic Park against Celtic, who won 1–0. The goal was scored on a penalty kick. In the third match they played, they lost 3–0 to Manchester United at Old Trafford. They however went on to beat Manchester United 1–0 in the fourth match, thanks to a Marcus Allbäck goal. Copenhagen lost their hope on further European matches at Estádio da Luz against Benfica where the match was closed after only 16 minutes where Benfica came in front 2–0, in a match that ended 3–1. Allbäck scored Copenhagen's goal in the 89th minute.

Their most successful and least important match was the last, where they beat Celtic by 3 to 1 at Parken, after goals by Atiba Hutchinson, Jesper Grønkjær and Marcus Allbäck.

=== Royal League ===
See also 2006–07 Royal League

In the group stage F.C. Copenhagen were in group 2 with the archrivals Brøndby IF, Swedish Hammarby IF and Norwegian Lillestrøm S.K. in the group 2. FCK won three matches and FCK qualified for the quarter finals, where they met IF Elfsborg.

The match ended 1–2 at Borås Arena after goals by Hjalte Nørregaard and Michael Silberbauer. In the semi-finals, FCK drew the Swedish team, Helsingborgs IF, who was without their big star Henrik Larsson. The match was played at Parken and FCK won 3–1. Fredrik Berglund score twice in the first 15 minutes and Aílton José Almeida scored the game's last goal in the 32nd minute.

F.C. Copenhagen lost in the 2007 Royal League Final, after Martin Ericsson scored on a penalty shoot for Brøndby at Brøndby Stadion. This was the only goal in the quite boring final. For the first time, FCK did not win the Royal League.

== Squads ==
The following squads, are lists with all the players, who have played in FC København in the 2006-07 season.

=== First team ===
Note: Flags indicate national team as defined under FIFA eligibility rules; some limited exceptions apply. Players may hold more than one non-FIFA nationality.

No.	Pos.	Nation	Player
1	GK	DEN	Jesper Christiansen
2	DF	DEN	Lars Jacobsen
3	DF	DEN	Niclas Jensen (bought from Fulham)
4	MF	DEN	Hjalte Nørregaard
5	DF	NOR	Brede Hangeland
6	MF	SWE	Tobias Linderoth (captain)
7	FW	BRA	Aílton José Almeida (bought from Örgryte)
8	MF	DEN	Michael Silberbauer
9	FW	SWE	Fredrik Berglund
10	FW	DEN	Jesper Grønkjær
11	FW	SWE	Marcus Allbäck
13	MF	CAN	Atiba Hutchinson
14	DF	DEN	Michael Gravgaard (vice-captain)
15	DF	NOR	André Bergdølmo (sold to Strømsgodset)
16	DF	DEN	Dan Thomassen
17	DF	SWE	Oscar Wendt

No.	Pos.	Nation	Player
19	MF	DEN	Jacob Neestrup (U squad)
20	MF	GHA	Razak Pimpong (sold to Viking)
21	GK	DEN	Thomas Villadsen
22	MF	DEN	Morten Bertolt
23	MF	DEN	William Kvist
24	MF	DEN	Jeppe Brandrup
25	DF	DEN	Jamil Fearrington (contract cancelled)
26	DF	DEN	Nikolaj Hansen
27	MF	DEN	Martin Bernburg (sold to Nordsjælland)
28	MF	DEN	Martin Bergvold (sold to Livorno)
29	FW	DEN	Lasse Qvist (from youth squad)
30	MF	DEN	Mads Laudrup (U squad)
31	GK	DEN	Benny Gall
33	MF	DEN	Şaban Özdoğan (U squad)
41	GK	AUS	Nathan Coe (bought from PSV Eindhoven)

=== Reserve team ===
Note: Flags indicate national team as defined under FIFA eligibility rules; some limited exceptions apply. Players may hold more than one non-FIFA nationality.

No.	Pos.	Nation	Player
—	GK	DEN	Martin Jacobsen
—	GK	RSA	Lee Langeveldt
—	DF	DEN	Rasmus Bogh
—	DF	DEN	Jamil Fearrington
—	DF	DEN	Mike Hansen
—	DF	RSA	Bongumusa Mthethwa
—	DF	DEN	Peter Piil
—	DF	DEN	Nicklas Svendsen
—	DF	DEN	Casper Windfeld
—	MF	DEN	Mathias Gravesen

No.	Pos.	Nation	Player
—	MF	DEN	Mads Laudrup
—	MF	DEN	Stefan Monberg (sold to Fremad Amager)
—	MF	DEN	Jacob Neestrup
—	MF	DEN	Kim Tandrup
—	MF	DEN	Kenneth Thinter
—	FW	DEN	Kenneth Beck
—	FW	GHA	Fosu Boateng
—	FW	SWE	Erton Fejzullahu (on loan at Mjällby)
—	FW	DEN	Lasse Qvist (now first team)

== Transfers ==
=== Players In ===
Date	No.	Player	From	Comments	Link
2006-06-14	9	Fredrik Berglund	Esbjerg		
2006-06-15	21	Thomas Villadsen		Youth player - now first team player	
2006-06-15	26	Nikolaj Hansen		Youth player - now first team player	
2006-06-15	25	Jamil Fearrington		Youth player - now first team player	
2006-06-19	17	Oscar Wendt	IFK Göteborg		
2006-06-23	10	Jesper Grønkjær	VfB Stuttgart		
2006-08-30	4	Hjalte Nørregaard	Heerenveen		
2006-12-02	29	Lasse Qvist		Youth player - now first team player	
2007-01-01	7	Aílton José Almeida	Örgryte		
2007-01-01	22	Morten Bertolt	Ham-Kam	returns from loan	
2007-01-21	3	Niclas Jensen	Fulham		
2007-01-31	41	Nathan Coe	PSV		

=== Players out ===
Date	No.	Player	To	Comments	Link
2006-06-02	12	Thomas Røll	Midtjylland		
2006-06-19	9	Peter Ijeh	Viking		
2006-07-03	3	Urmas Rooba	Vejle		
2006-07-24	7	Álvaro Santos	Sochaux		
2006-08-31	22	Morten Bertolt	Ham-Kam	on loan	
2006-11-29	25	Jamil Fearrington		contract cancelled	
2007-01-01	27	Martin Bernburg	Nordsjælland		
2007-01-10	28	Martin Bergvold	Livorno		
2007-03-13	15	André Bergdølmo	Strømsgodset		
2007-03-27	20	Razak Pimpong	Viking		

== Competition statistics ==
=== Danish Superliga ===
==== Classification ====
Pos	Team	Pld	W	D	L	GF	GA	GD	Pts	Qualification or relegation
1	Copenhagen (C)	33	23	7	3	60	23	+37	76	Qualification to Champions League second qualifying round
2	Midtjylland	33	18	9	6	58	39	+19	63	Qualification to UEFA Cup first qualifying round
3	AaB	33	18	7	8	55	35	+20	61	Qualification to Intertoto Cup second round
4	OB	33	17	7	9	45	36	+9	58	Qualification to UEFA Cup first qualifying round (Note: OB qualified for UEFA Cup first qualifying round by winning the 2006–07 Danish Cup.)
5	Nordsjælland	33	16	9	8	68	40	+28	57	

Rules for classification: 1) points; 2) goal difference; 3) number of goals scored.
(C) Champions

==== Results summary ====
Overall								Home						Away					
Pld	W	D	L	GF	GA	GD	Pts	W	D	L	GF	GA	GD	W	D	L	GF	GA	GD
33	23	7	3	60	23	+37	76	11	3	3	32	17	+15	12	4	0	28	6	+22

Last updated: 27 May.
Source: danskfodbold.com

== Results ==
Results for F.C. Copenhagen for season 2006-2007.

NOTE: scores are written FCK first

Date	Venue	Opponents	Score	Comp	FCK scorers	Match Report*
July 2, 2006	Malmö Stadion, Malmö, Sweden	Malmö FF	2-2	F	Hangeland, Vinzents (MFF) (og)	FCK
July 9, 2006	Briskeby Gressbane, Hamar, Norway	Ham-Kam	3-1	F	Santos, Gravgaard, Wendt	FCK
July 12, 2006	Sportcentrum Norrtälje, Norrtälje, Sweden	Djurgården	1-0	F	Allbäck	FCK
July 19, 2006	Forum Horsens Stadion, Horsens	Horsens	1-0	DSL	Santos	FCK
July 23, 2006	Silkeborg Stadion, Silkeborg	Silkeborg	4-1	DSL	Olsen (SIF) (og), Allbäck, Silberbauer, Santos	FCK
July 26, 2006	Parken, Copenhagen	MyPa	2-0	CLQ	Bergdølmo, Gravgaard	FCK, UEFA
August 2, 2006	Saviniemi, Anjalankoski, Finland	MyPa	2-2	CLQ	Berglund, Linderoth	FCK, UEFA
August 5, 2006	Viborg Stadion, Viborg	Viborg	3-1	DSL	Berglund, Grønkjær, Silberbauer	FCK
August 9, 2006	Parken, Copenhagen	Ajax	1-2	CLQ	Hangeland	FCK, UEFA
August 13, 2006	Parken, Copenhagen	OB	1-1	DSL	Gravgaard	FCK
August 19, 2006	Vejle Stadion, Vejle	Vejle	4-0	DSL	Linderoth (2), Berglund (2)	FCK
August 23, 2006	Amsterdam ArenA, Amsterdam, Netherlands	Ajax	2-0	CLQ	Silberbauer, Vermaelen (Ajax) (og)	FCK, UEFA
August 27, 2006	Parken, Copenhagen	AaB	0-2	DSL		FCK
September 9, 2006	Esbjerg Idrætspark, Esbjerg	Esbjerg	2-2	DSL	Allbäck, Silberbauer	FCK
September 13, 2006	Parken, Copenhagen	Benfica	0-0	CLF		FCK, UEFA
September 17, 2006	Parken, Copenhagen	Nordsjælland	1-0	DSL	Bergdølmo	FCK
September 20, 2006	Lerpytter Stadion, Thisted	Thisted	4-1 (pen)	DC3	Nørregaard (2), Wendt, Bergvold	FCK
September 23, 2006	Parken, Copenhagen	Midtjylland	2-1	DSL	Allbäck, Thomassen	FCK
September 26, 2006	Celtic Park, Glasgow, Scotland	Celtic	0-1	CLF		FCK, UEFA
October 1, 2006	Parken, Copenhagen	Brøndby	1-0	DSL	Berglund	FCK
October 15, 2006	Essex Park Randers, Randers	Randers	2-0	DSL	Gravgaard, Berglund	FCK
October 17, 2006	Old Trafford, Manchester, England	Man Utd	0-3	CLF		FCK, UEFA
October 22, 2006	Parken, Copenhagen	Viborg	3-0	DSL	Gravgaard, Allbäck, Kvist	FCK
October 25, 2006	Fionia Park, Odense	OB	0-0	DSL		FCK
October 29, 2006	Parken, Copenhagen	Vejle	3-0	DSL	Berglund, Bergvold (2)	FCK
November 1, 2006	Parken, Copenhagen	Man Utd	1-0	CLF	Allbäck	FCK, UEFA
November 5, 2006	Parken, Copenhagen	Brøndby	3-1	DSL	Allbäck (2), Bergvold	FCK
November 8, 2006	Parken, Copenhagen	Esbjerg	3-1	DC4	Berglund (2), Nørregaard	FCK
November 12, 2006	Aalborg Stadion, Aalborg	AaB	1-0	DSL	Silberbauer	FCK
November 19, 2006	Parken, Copenhagen	Midtjylland	2-2	DSL	Hutchinson, Allbäck	FCK
November 21, 2006	Estádio da Luz, Lisbon, Portugal	Benfica	1-3	CLF	Allbäck	FCK, UEFA
November 26, 2006	Parken, Copenhagen	Randers	2-1	DSL	Allbäck, Berglund	FCK
November 30, 2006	Åråsen Stadion, Lillestrøm, Norway	Lillestrøm	0-1	RLB		FCK
December 3, 2006	Parken, Copenhagen	Lillestrøm	0-1	RLB		FCK
December 6, 2006	Parken, Copenhagen	Celtic	3-1	CLF	Hutchinson, Grønkjær, Allbäck	FCK, UEFA
December 9, 2006	Söderstadion, Stockholm, Sweden	Hammarby	2-1	RLB	Allbäck, Hutchinson	FCK
January 28, 2007	La Manga Club, Los Belones, Spain	Basel	3-3	F	Aílton, Allbäck, Silberbauer	FCK
January 31, 2007	La Manga Club, Los Belones, Spain	Hércules	1-1	F	Aílton	FCK
February 11, 2007	Parken, Copenhagen	Brøndby	0-1	RLB		FCK
February 18, 2007	Brøndby Stadium, Brøndby	Brøndby	3-1	RLB	Silberbauer (2), Aílton	FCK
February 20, 2007	KB's anlæg, Frederiksberg	Viking	3-0	F	Bertolt, Qvist, Brandrup	FCK
February 25, 2007	Parken, Copenhagen	Hammarby	4-0	RLB	Allbäck, Berglund (2), Grønkjær	FCK
March 4, 2007	Borås Arena, Borås, Sweden	Elfsborg	2-1	RL4	Nørregaard, Silberbauer	FCK
March 8, 2007	Parken, Copenhagen	Helsingborg	3-1	RLS	Berglund (2), Aílton	FCK
March 11, 2007	Blue Water Arena, Esbjerg	Esbjerg	0-0	DSL		FCK
March 15, 2007	Brøndby Stadion, Brøndby	Brøndby	0-1	RLF		FCK
March 18, 2007	Parken, Copenhagen	Nordsjælland	1-1	DSL	Hutchinson	FCK
April 1, 2007	Forum Horsens Stadion, Horsens	Horsens	3-1	DSL	Grønkjær (2), Nørregaard	FCK
April 5, 2007	Parken, Copenhagen	Silkeborg	3-1	DSL	Grønkjær, Silberbauer, Hutchinson	FCK
April 9, 2007	SAS Arena, Herning	Midtjylland	4-1	DSL	Silberbauer (2), Hutchinson, Troest (FCM) (og)	FCK
April 12, 2007	SAS Arena, Herning	Midtjylland	3-2 (aet)	DC5	Berglund, Thomassen, Hangeland	FCK
April 15, 2007	Parken, Copenhagen	OB	4-2	DSL	Aílton, Silberbauer (2), Nørregaard	FCK
April 18, 2007	Farum Park, Farum	Nordsjælland	1-0	DSL	Grønkjær	FCK
April 22, 2007	Parken, Copenhagen	Horsens	3-1	DSL	Nørregaard, Aílton, Kvist	FCK
April 25, 2007	Lyngby Stadion, Lyngby	Lyngby	3-2	DCS	Berglund (2), Nørregaard	FCK
April 29, 2007	Silkeborg Stadion, Silkeborg	Silkeborg	1-0	DSL	Allbäck	FCK
May 2, 2007	Parken, Copenhagen	Lyngby	4-0	DCS	Aílton, Hämäläinen (LBK) (og), Berglund, Nørregaard	FCK
May 5, 2007	Parken, Copenhagen	AaB	1-2	DSL	Linderoth	FCK
May 9, 2007	Brøndby Stadion, Brøndby	Brøndby	1-0	DSL	Allbäck	FCK
May 13, 2007	Parken, Copenhagen	Randers	1-0	DSL	Aílton	FCK
May 17, 2007	Parken, Copenhagen	OB	1-2	DCF	Hutchinson	FCK
May 20, 2007	Viborg Stadion, Viborg	Viborg	1-0	DSL	Allbäck	FCK
May 24, 2007	Parken, Copenhagen	Esbjerg	1-2	DSL	Thomassen	FCK
May 27, 2007	Vejle Stadion, Vejle	Vejle	0-0	DSL		FCK

Key:

- DSL = Danish Superliga
- DC = Danish Cup
- CLQ = UEFA Champions League Qualifier
- CLF = UEFA Champions League Group F
- RLB = Royal League Group B
- RL4 = Royal League Quarter final
- RLS = Royal League Semi final
- F = Friendly match

=== Report explanation ===
- FCK in Danish
- UEFA in English

== Player statistics ==
No.	Player	Apps (as sub)	Goals	Yellows	Reds
1	(Denmark) Jesper Christiansen	59	0	2	0
2	(Denmark) Lars Jacobsen	53	0	4	0
3	(Denmark) Niclas Jensen	19	0	3	0
4	(Denmark) Hjalte Nørregaard	40 (6)	9	7	0
5	(Norway) Brede Hangeland	57 (3)	3	5	0
6	(Sweden) Tobias Linderoth	43	4	13	1
7	(Brazil) Álvaro Santos	5 (1)	3	0	0
7	(Brazil) Aílton José Almeida	18 (5)	8	3	0
8	(Denmark) Michael Silberbauer	46 (8)	15	9	0
9	(Sweden) Fredrik Berglund	42 (15)	18	2	0
10	(Denmark) Jesper Grønkjær	38 (2)	7	7	1
11	(Sweden) Marcus Allbäck	39 (4)	18	5	0
13	(Canada) Atiba Hutchinson	58 (2)	7	5	0
14	(Denmark) Michael Gravgaard	56 (1)	5	6	0
15	(Norway) André Bergdølmo	12 (3)	2	1	0
16	(Denmark) Dan Thomassen	17 (13)	3	0	0
17	(Sweden) Oscar Wendt	36 (7)	2	4	0
19	(Denmark) Jacob Neestrup	0 (2)	0	0	0
20	(Ghana) Razak Pimpong	7 (19)	0	2	0
21	(Denmark) Thomas Villadsen	2	0	0	0
22	(Denmark) Morten Bertolt	2 (9)	1	1	0
23	(Denmark) William Kvist	26 (34)	2	5	0
24	(Denmark) Jeppe Brandrup	5 (11)	1	0	0
25	(Denmark) Jamil Fearrington	1 (2)	0	0	0
26	(Denmark) Nikolaj Hansen	3 (4)	0	0	0
27	(Denmark) Martin Bernburg	2 (5)	0	0	0
28	(Denmark) Martin Bergvold	10 (16)	4	1	0
29	(Denmark) Lasse Qvist	1 (5)	1	0	0
30	(Denmark) Mads Laudrup	0 (5)	0	0	0
31	(Denmark) Benny Gall	2 (2)	0	0	0
33	(Denmark) Şaban Özdoğan	0 (2)	0	0	0
41	(Australia) Nathan Coe	0	0	0	0
--	(Denmark) Kim Tandrup	1	0	0	0
--	(Denmark) Thomas Christiansen	0 (1)	0	0	0
--	(Denmark) Kenneth Beck	0 (1)	0	0	0
--	(Sweden) Erton Fejzullahu	0 (1)	0	0	0

== Honours ==
- The Autumn Profile (2006): Michael Gravgaard
- The Golden Goalie (2006): Jesper Christiansen
- Profile of the year in the Superliga (2006): Michael Gravgaard
- Superliga Player of the Year (2006): Tobias Linderoth
- Best Swedish Midfielder (2006): Tobias Linderoth
- Best Swedish Forward (2006): Marcus Allbäck
- Player of the Year (2006–07): Jesper Grønkjær
- Team of the Year (2006): Jesper Christiansen, Lars Jacobsen and Michael Gravgaard

== See also ==
- 2006–07 Danish Superliga
- 2006–07 Danish Cup
- 2006–07 UEFA Champions League
- 2006–07 Royal League
