= List of F.C. Copenhagen seasons =

This is a list of seasons played by F.C. Copenhagen in Danish and European football, from 1992 (when Copenhagen were founded) to the present day. It details the club's achievements in major competitions, and the top scorers for each season.

== Seasons ==
Performance graph of Football Club København

Season	Div	Pos	Danish Cup	Europe	Other	Top scorer	
1992–93	Sup	1st	Semi-finals	Intertoto Cup Group winner UEFA Cup second round		Martin Johansen	19
1993–94	Sup	2nd	Fifth round	Intertoto Cup Fifth in group Champions League second round	Kings Cup Winners	Lars Højer	14
1994–95	Sup	6th	Winners	UEFA Cup first round		Per Frandsen	17
1995–96	Sup	7th	Fifth round	Cup Winners' Cup first round	Danish Supercup Winners	Michael Johansen, Lars Højer	8
1996–97	Sup	8th	Winners	Intertoto Cup Second in group 3	League Cup Winners	Bjarne Goldbæk	9
1997–98	Sup	3rd	Runner-up	Cup Winners' Cup second round		David Nielsen	13
1998–99	Sup	7th	Quarter-finals	Cup Winners' Cup second round		David Nielsen	17
1999–00	Sup	8th	Quarter-finals	Intertoto Cup second round	Ørestad Cup Winners	David Nielsen	9
2000–01	Sup	1st	Fifth round			Todi Jónsson	12
2001–02	Sup	2nd	Runner-up	Champions League Third qualifying round UEFA Cup third round	Danish Supercup Winners	Sibusiso Zuma	15
2002–03	Sup	1st	Quarter-finals	UEFA Cup first round		Todi Jónsson	15
2003–04	Sup	1st	Winners	Champions League Third qualifying round UEFA Cup second round		Álvaro Santos	17
2004–05	Sup	2nd	Semi-finals	Champions League Second qualifying round	Royal League Winners	Álvaro Santos	13
2005–06	Sup	1st	Quarter-finals	UEFA Cup first round	Royal League Winners; Danish League Cup runner-up	Álvaro Santos	18
2006–07	Sup	1st	Runner-up	Champions League Fourth in group F	Royal League runner-up Danish League Cup runner-up	Fredrik Berglund	18
2007–08	Sup	3rd	Semi-finals	Champions League Third qualifying round UEFA Cup Fourth in group B		Marcus Allbäck, Morten Nordstrand	12
2008–09	Sup	1st	Winners	UEFA Cup Round of 32		Morten Nordstrand	20
2009–10	Sup	1st	Fourth round	UEFA Champions League Play-off round UEFA Europa League Round of 32		Dame N'Doye	24
2010–11	Sup	1st	Fourth round	UEFA Champions League Round of 16		Dame N'Doye	28
2011–12	Sup	2nd	Winners	UEFA Champions League Play-off round UEFA Europa League Third in group B		Dame N'Doye	26
2012–13	Sup	1st	Quarter-finals	UEFA Champions League Play-off round UEFA Europa League Third in group E		Andreas Cornelius	20
2013–14	Sup	2nd	Runner-up	UEFA Champions League Fourth in group B		Igor Vetokele	15
2014–15	Sup	2nd	Winners	UEFA Champions League Play-off round UEFA Europa League Fourth in group B		Nicolai Jørgensen	12
2015–16	Sup	1st	Winners	UEFA Europa League Third qualifying round		Nicolai Jørgensen	19
2016–17	Sup	1st	Winners	UEFA Champions League Third in group G UEFA Europa League Round of 16		Andreas Cornelius	21
2017–18	Sup	4th	Fourth round	UEFA Champions League Play-off round UEFA Europa League Round of 32		Pieros Sotiriou	16
2018–19	Sup	1st	Fourth round	UEFA Europa League Fourth in group C		Robert Skov	29
2019–20	Sup	2nd	Quarter-finals	UEFA Champions League Third qualifying round UEFA Europa League Quarter-finals		Pieros Sotiriou	13
2020–21	Sup	3rd	Fourth round	UEFA Europa League Play-off round		Jonas Wind	15
2021–22	Sup	1st	Third round	UEFA Europa Conference League Round of 16		Pep Biel	18
2022–23	Sup	1st	Winners	UEFA Champions League Fourth in group G		Viktor Claesson	17
2023–24	Sup	3rd	Quarter-finals	UEFA Champions League Round of 16	European play-off match winner	Orri Óskarsson	15
2024–25	Sup	1st	Winners	UEFA Conference League Round of 16		Kevin Diks	11
