= 2004–05 F.C. Copenhagen season =

F.C. Copenhagen
2004–05 season
- Chairman: Flemming Østergaard
- Manager: Hans Backe
- Danish Superliga: 2nd
- Danish Cup: Semifinals
- UEFA Champions League: Second qualifying round
- Royal League: Winner
- Top goalscorer: League: Hjalte Nørregaard, Álvaro Santos, Magne Hoseth (8); All: Álvaro Santos (13)
- Highest home attendance: 40,654 (vs Brøndby IF, 19 September 2004
- Lowest home attendance: 5,845 (vs IFK Göteborg, 24 February 2005

FCK ended second in the Danish Superliga in the season 2004-05.

They won on May 26 the Royal League again, after an exciting final against IFK Göteborg, which were decided in a penalty shootout.

FCK were knocked out of the UEFA Champions League by ND Gorica on August 4 after an embarrassing defeat on 5-0 home after FCK won 2-1 away.

== Squad ==
The following squads, are lists with all the players, who have played in F.C. Copenhagen in the 2004-05 season.

Note: Flags indicate national team as defined under FIFA eligibility rules; some limited exceptions apply. Players may hold more than one non-FIFA nationality.

No.	Pos.	Nation	Player
1	GK	SWE	Magnus Kihlstedt
2	DF	DEN	Lars Jacobsen
3	DF	EST	Urmas Rooba
4	DF	DEN	Bo Svensson (captain)
5	DF	FIN	Janne Saarinen
6	MF	SWE	Tobias Linderoth
7	FW	BRA	Álvaro Santos
8	MF	DEN	Michael Silberbauer
9	MF	NOR	Magne Hoseth
10	FW	RSA	Sibusiso Zuma
11	MF	DEN	Thomas Røll
12	FW	FRO	Todi Jónsson
15	DF	DEN	Peter Christiansen

No.	Pos.	Nation	Player
16	DF	DEN	Dan Thomassen
17	DF	DEN	Ole Tobiasen
18	MF	DEN	Carsten Fredgaard
21	GK	HUN	Balázs Rabóczki
22	MF	DEN	Morten Bertolt
23	MF	DEN	William Kvist
24	MF	DEN	Christian Traoré
25	MF	DEN	Hjalte Nørregaard
26	MF	RSA	Elrio van Heerden
27	FW	DEN	Jesper Bech
28	MF	DEN	Martin Bergvold
31	GK	DEN	Benny Gall
32	FW	DEN	Peter Møller

== Competition statistics ==
=== Danish Superliga ===
==== Classification ====
Pos	Team	Pld	W	D	L	GF	GA	GD	Pts	Qualification or relegation
1	Brøndby (C)	33	20	9	4	61	23	+38	69	Qualification to Champions League second qualifying round and Royal League
2	Copenhagen	33	16	9	8	53	39	+14	57	Qualification to UEFA Cup second qualifying round and Royal League
3	Midtjylland	33	17	6	10	49	40	+9	57	Qualification to UEFA Cup second qualifying round and Royal League
4	AaB	33	15	8	10	59	45	+14	53	Qualification to Royal League
5	Esbjerg fB	33	13	10	10	61	47	+14	49	Qualification to UEFA Cup first qualifying round (Note: Esbjerg fB qualified for UEFA Cup first qualifying round via UEFA Fair Play ranking.)

Rules for classification: 1) points; 2) goal difference; 3) number of goals scored.
(C) Champions

==== Results summary ====
Overall								Home						Away					
Pld	W	D	L	GF	GA	GD	Pts	W	D	L	GF	GA	GD	W	D	L	GF	GA	GD
33	16	9	8	53	39	+14	57	9	5	3	33	15	+18	7	4	5	20	24	−4

Last updated: 19 June.
Source: danskfodbold.com

== Results ==
Results for F.C. Copenhagen for season 2004-2005.

NOTE: scores are written FCK first

Date	Venue	Opponents	Score	Comp	FCK scorers
July 5, 2004	KÍ Stadium, Klaksvík, Faroe Islands	Klaksvík	0-1	F
July 7, 2004	Gundadalur, Tórshavn, Faroe Islands	HB	4-1	F	Santos (2), Silberbauer (2)
July 11, 2004	Horne Stadion, Faaborg	Hamburg	0-1	F
July 15, 2004	Ullevi, Gothenburg, Sweden	Tottenham	2-2	F	Santos, Røll
July 20, 2004	Parken, Copenhagen	AaB	2-0	DSC	Jacobsen, Tobiasen
July 24, 2004	Silkeborg Stadion, Silkeborg	Silkeborg	2-2	DSL	Silberbauer, Røll
July 27, 2004	Stadion Športni Park, Nova Gorica, Slovenia	Gorica	2-1	CLQ	Santos, Møller
August 1, 2004	Parken, Copenhagen	Esbjerg	2-2	DSL	Nørregaard, Tobiasen
August 4, 2004	Parken, Copenhagen	Gorica	0-5	CLQ
August 7, 2004	Viborg Stadion, Viborg	Viborg	2-3	DSL	Bech, Silberbauer
August 15, 2004	Parken, Copenhagen	OB	1-1	DSL	Hoseth
August 29, 2004	Parken, Copenhagen	AaB	3-2	DSL	Hoseth, Santos, Bech
September 11, 2004	Randers Stadion, Randers	Randers	0-0	DSL
September 19, 2004	Parken, Copenhagen	Brøndby	1-3	DSL	Nørregaard
September 22, 2004	Parken, Copenhagen	AGF	2-1	DSL	Hoseth, Nørregaard
September 26, 2004	Farum Park, Farum	Nordsjælland	2-1	DSL	Rasmussen (FCN) (og), Santos
October 2, 2004	Parken, Copenhagen	Herfølge	2-0	DSL	Nørregaard, Zuma
October 17, 2004	Silkeborg Stadion, Silkeborg	Silkeborg	1-4	DSL	Hoseth
October 24, 2004	Parken, Copenhagen	Viborg	0-0	DSL
October 27, 2004	Parken, Copenhagen	OB	2-1	DC	Nørregaard, Tobiasen
October 30, 2004	Farum Park, Farum	Nordsjælland	3-2	DSL	Bech, Nørregaard, Zuma
November 3, 2004	SAS Arena, Herning	Midtjylland	0-2	DSL
November 7, 2004	Parken, Copenhagen	AGF	2-3	DSL	Nørregaard, Tobiasen
November 11, 2004	Ullevi, Gothenburg, Sweden	Göteborg	1-0	RLB	Nørregaard
November 14, 2004	Herfølge Stadion, Herfølge	Herfølge	1-0	DSL	Møller
November 21, 2004	Parken, Copenhagen	AaB	4-0	DSL	Møller (3), Thomassen
November 27, 2004	Esbjerg Idrætspark, Esbjerg	Esbjerg	1-1	DSL	Tobiasen
December 2, 2004	Alfheim Stadion, Tromsø, Norway	Tromsø IL	0-0	RLB
December 5, 2004	Parken, Copenhagen	Brøndby	1-1	RLB	van Heerden
January 28, 2005	La Manga Club, Murcia, Spain	Lokomotiv Moscow	0-3	LMC
January 31, 2005	La Manga Club, Murcia, Spain	Vålerenga	1-0	LMC	Bech
February 4, 2005	La Manga Club, Murcia, Spain	Rosenborg	2-1	LMC	Santos, Zuma
February 13, 2005	Parken, Copenhagen	Tromsø	3-0	RLB
February 17, 2005	Brøndby Stadion, Brøndby	Brøndby	0-2	RLB	Silberbauer (2)
February 24, 2005	Parken, Copenhagen	Göteborg	1-0	RLB	Bergvold
March 3, 2005	Parken, Copenhagen	Rosenborg	2-2	RL1	Santos, Hoseth
March 6, 2005	Parken, Copenhagen	Fremad Amager	3-1	DC	Santos, Silberbauer, Hoseth
March 13, 2005	Parken, Copenhagen	Midtjylland	4-0	DSL	Svensson, Hoseth, Silberbauer (2)
March 17, 2005	Malmö Stadion, Malmö, Sweden	Malmö	0-1	RL1
March 20, 2005	Parken, Copenhagen	Randers	4-0	DSL	Santos, Bech (2), Hoseth
April 3, 2005	Odense Stadion, Odense	OB	2-1	DSL	Silberbauer (2)
April 6, 2005	Brøndby Stadion, Brøndby	Brøndby	0-1	DC
April 10, 2005	Parken, Copenhagen	Brøndby	3-0	DSL	Zuma, Nørregaard, Hoseth
April 14, 2005	Lerkendal Stadion, Trondheim, Norway	Rosenborg	1-0	RL1	Nørregaard
April 17, 2005	Atletion, Århus	AGF	2-1	DSL	Santos, Nørregaard
April 20, 2005	Parken, Copenhagen	Brøndby	2-2	DC	Santos, Saarinen
April 23, 2005	Parken, Copenhagen	Nordsjælland	2-0	DSL	Møller, Santos
April 28, 2005	Parken, Copenhagen	Malmö	2-1	RL1	Møller, Zuma
May 1, 2005	Viborg Stadion, Viborg	Viborg	2-0	DSL	Møller, Santos
May 8, 2005	Parken, Copenhagen	Silkeborg	0-1	DSL
May 16, 2005	Brøndby Stadion, Brøndby	Brøndby	0-5	DSL
May 19, 2005	Parken, Copenhagen	OB	1-1	DSL	Zuma
May 22, 2005	Randers Stadion, Randers	Randers	1-0	DSL	Hoseth
May 26, 2005	Ullevi, Gothenburg, Sweden	Göteborg	12-11 (pen)	RLF	Nørregaard
May 29, 2005	SAS Arena, Herning	Midtjylland	0-1	DSL
June 12, 2005	Parken, Copenhagen	Esbjerg	1-0	DSL	Santos
June 15, 2005	Aalborg Stadion, Aalborg	AaB	1-1	DSL	Zuma
June 19, 2005	Parken, Copenhagen	Herfølge	1-1	DSL	Santos

Key:

- DSL = Danish Superliga
- DC = Danish Cup
- CLQ = UEFA Champions League Qualifier
- RLB = Royal League Group B
- RL1 = Royal League Group 1
- RLF = Royal League Final
- LMC = La Manga Cup
- F = Friendly match

== Top goalscorers ==
Note! Only official matches!

Álvaro Santos	13
Hjalte Nørregaard	12
Magne Hoseth	10
Michael Silberbauer	9
Peter Møller	8

== See also ==
- 2004–05 Danish Superliga
- 2004–05 UEFA Champions League
- 2004–05 Royal League
