= Martin Bernburg =

Danish footballer (born 1985)

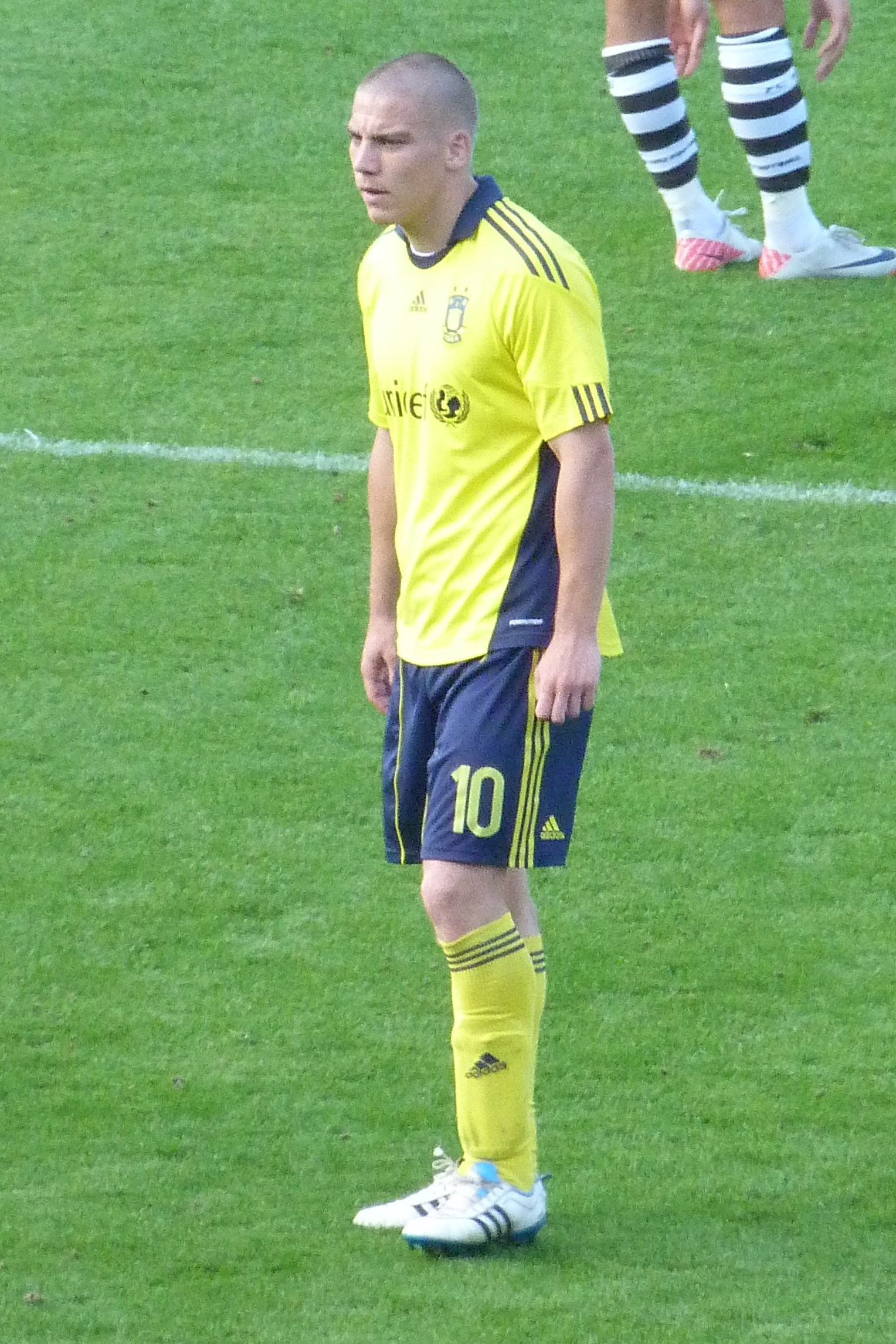
- Martin Bernburg in 2011.

Personal information
- Full name: Martin Løfqvist Bernburg
- Date of birth: 26 December 1985 (age 40)
- Place of birth: Amager, Copenhagen, Denmark
- Height: 1.82 m (6 ft 0 in)
- Position: Striker

Team information
- Current team: Nykøbing (youth)

Youth career
- Fremad Amager
- B.93
- 2002–2005: KB

Senior career*
Years	Team	Apps	(Gls)
2005–2006	Copenhagen	1	(0)
2007–2009	Nordsjælland	69	(32)
2009–2014	Brøndby	49	(4)
2015–2017	Tårnby FF	28	(12)

International career
2004	Denmark U19	5	(1)
2004–2005	Denmark U20	5	(1)
2006	Denmark U21	1	(0)
2008–2014	Denmark	4	(1)

Managerial career
- 2014: Brøndby (U19 assistant)
- 2018: Helsingør (youth)
- 2021–: Nykøbing (youth)
- * Club domestic league appearances and goals as of 2 February 2020 (UTC)

Martin Løfqvist Bernburg (Danish pronunciation: [ˈpɛɐ̯ˀnˌpɒˀ]; born 26 December 1985) is a Danish former professional footballer who played as a striker. He previously notably played for FC Nordsjælland and Brøndby IF and also gained caps for the Danish national team.

== Club career ==
=== FC Copenhagen ===
Born in Amager, Copenhagen, he was the consecutive top scorer for several seasons of F.C. Copenhagens youth team; he played alongside the likes of other Copenhagen talents William Kvist, Lasse Quist, Jeppe Brandrup, Thomas Villadsen, Morten Bertolt, and Nicklas Svendsen signed senior contracts and was subsequently moved to the first team squad. All being considered great talents, and all being parts of the national youth teams, only William Kvist managed to become a regular.

Appearing only seven times for F.C. Copenhagen (Note: SAS Ligaen (one match) and Royal League (four matches).) with his league debut coming on 13 August 2006 in a game where he played the first 54 minutes of the Superliga match against Odense BK at Parken Stadium. He only played because Marcus Allbäck had a small injury.

In FC Copenhagen, the road to first team football was long behind the likes of Marcus Allbäck, Fredrik Berglund and Alvaro Santos. As a consequence of this, he transferred to FC Nordsjælland where he instantly became a success.

=== FC Nordsjælland ===
Coming to FC Nordsjælland from F.C. Copenhagen, he was supposed to fill the hole that the departure of Morten Nordstrand to F.C. Copenhagen had left. Being physically stronger than Nordstrand, he quickly became an important player scoring in more than every other match. His strong performances had him linked with a move to both FC Midtjylland and Brøndby IF and later FC Utrecht expressed interest in him. His strong performances also earned him a call-up for the Danish national team, however he didn't make his debut at this time.

Alongside Hertha BSC FC Nordsjælland participated in the 2008–09 UEFA Cup on a UEFA Fair-Play quota. In their first qualification round, they draw Estonian TVMK Tallinn, where FC Nordsjælland proceeded 8–0 on aggregate score

Scottish club Queen of the South from Dumfries were drawn in the second qualification round. FC Nordsjælland won the first game 1–2. In the second match, Bob Harris had Queens in the lead from a well worked free-kick after 2 minutes. With Queen pushing for the critical second goal, with 5 minutes remaining two goals by Bernburg put the tie beyond Queens.

=== Brøndby IF ===
On 18 August 2009, Brøndby IF signed Bernburg on a five-year contract for an undisclosed fee. Bernburg was plagued with injuries since his transfer; he only made 49 league appearances for Brøndby, scoring four goals.

A few years after ending his career, he criticised the medical treatment he received in Brøndby after the dismissal of head coach Kent Nielsen and discussed mental health problems in professional football.

=== Tårnby FF ===
Bernburg was forced to end his professional career due to persistent knee injuries and retired in January 2014. On 6 July 2015, however, he signed with amateur side Tårnby FF. He stopped definitively after two years in Tårnby.

== International career ==
=== Denmark ===
As a result of an injury to Morten "Duncan" Rasmussen he on 2008-03-24 received a call-up to the Danish national team alongside Mikkel Thygesen who was replacing Martin Jørgensen. Bernburg who at the moment was suffering from jumper's knee had to be replaced by Morten Nordstrand.

On 2008-08-20 he received his second call-up, this time for a match against Spain, however, he spent the entire match on the bench as Denmark succumbed to a 3–0 loss.

On 2008-09-03 he was called up as a safety net to Nicklas Bendtner and Jon Dahl Tomasson who both suffered from minor injuries, for the matches against Hungary and Portugal in Denmark's 2010 FIFA World Cup qualification. Against Hungary, he spent the entire match on the bench. Against Portugal, however, he came in with 10 minutes to go in the game, when the score was 2–1 in Portugal's favour. He helped the Danish team to a sensational 2–3 win, earning him his first national cap.

== Coaching career ==
On 21 January 2014, Bernburg was named assistant coach of Brøndby IF U19 team.

After studying between 2015 and 2018, Bernburg worked as a mental coach at the academy of FC Helsingør in 2018. On 29 September 2021, Bernburg was hired as a mental coach at the academy of Nykøbing FC.

== Outside football ==
After ending his career, Bernburg studied a Bachelor of Science (BSc) in Exercise and Sport Sciences and continued on MSc level after receiving his diploma. In 2021, he finished his master's degree in Humanities and Social Sciences Sports Science.
