= Hjalte Nørregaard =

Danish footballer (born 1981)

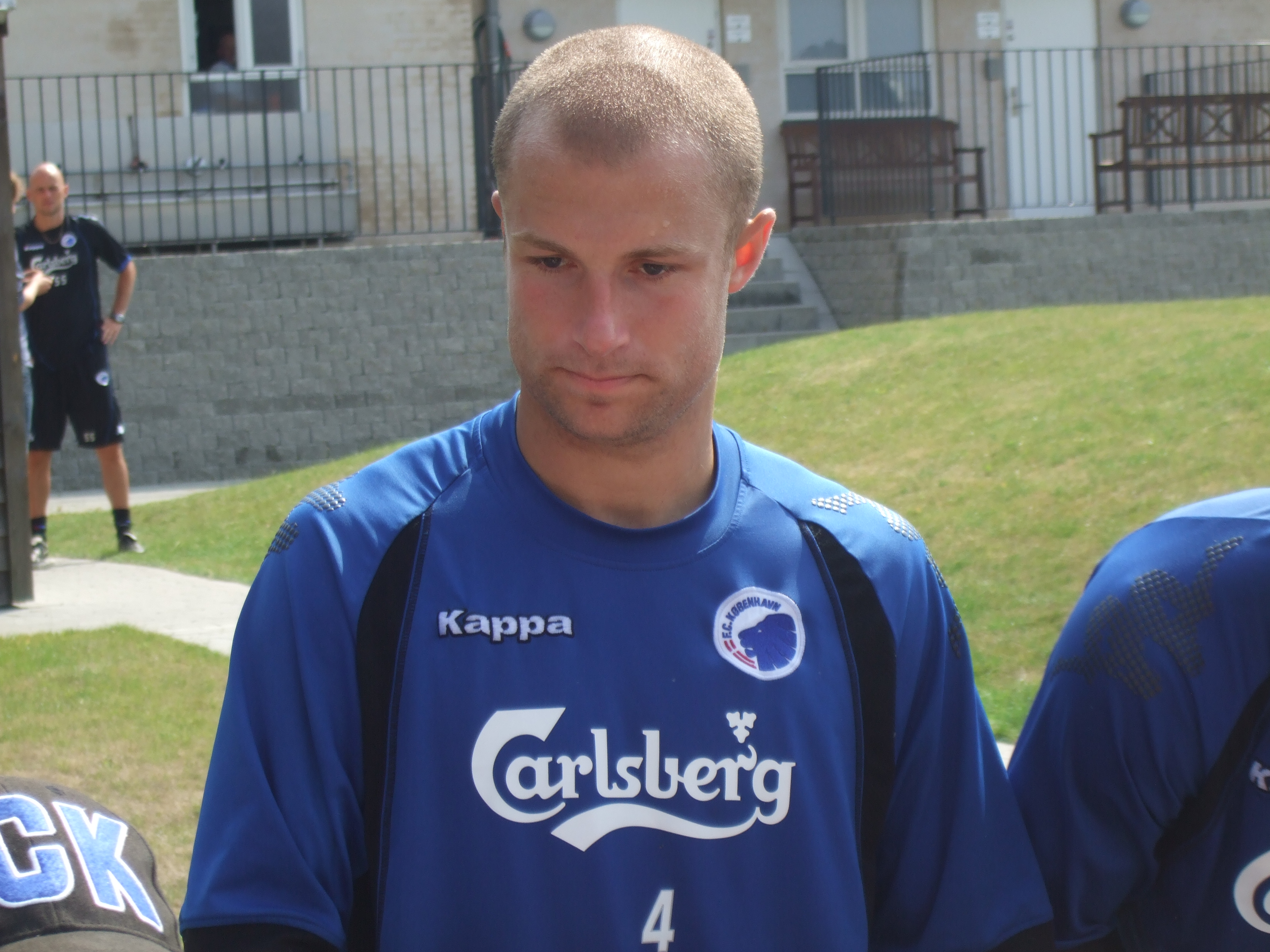
- Nørregaard with Copenhagen in 2008

Personal information
- Full name: Hjalte Bo Nørregaard
- Date of birth: 8 April 1981 (age 45)
- Place of birth: Copenhagen, Denmark
- Height: 1.82 m (6 ft 0 in)
- Position: Midfielder

Youth career
- –1999: KB

Senior career*
Years	Team	Apps	(Gls)
1999–2005	Copenhagen	89	(12)
2005–2006	Heerenveen	17	(2)
2006–2010	Copenhagen	130	(10)
2011–2014	AGF	66	(2)
2014–2015	Vendsyssel	15	(2)
Total		317	(28)

International career
1997	Denmark U17	8	(0)
1999–2000	Denmark U19	10	(3)
2002	Denmark U20	1	(0)
2003	Denmark U21	2	(0)
2007	Danish League XI	3	(0)
2008–2009	Denmark	4	(0)

Managerial career
- 2018–2020: Copenhagen (U19)
- 2020: Copenhagen (caretaker)
- * Club domestic league appearances and goals

Hjalte Bo Nørregaard (born 8 April 1981) is a Danish professional football manager and former player. He was most recently the caretaker manager of Danish Superliga club Copenhagen. As a player, he played as a midfielder and spent most of his career with Copenhagen.

Nørregaard is son of former Danish footballer Klaus Nørregaard. In November 2018, he was appointed as manager for the under-19 team of Copenhagen. In October 2020, he was appointed as caretaker manager of the club.

== Biography ==
Nørregaard started his career in KB and was in 1999 promoted to the first team, Copenhagen (FCK). He played for FCK until 2005 and became most famous for his 91st-minute goal against the arch-rivals Brøndby at the Brøndby Stadium in the so-called "championship final" in 2003. Since then, fans of Copenhagen have dubbed Brøndby Stadium, "Hjalte Park". The same year he was awarded as "cup fighter" after the win in the Danish Cup. He got a total of 120 matches, 17 goals and three Danish championships in 2001, 2003 and 2004, before moving to Dutch club Heerenveen.

The stay at Heerenveen was not a success, as coach Gertjan Verbeek thought he was a supporting striker. After only one year with Heerenveen, he moved back to FCK to participate in their 2006–07 UEFA Champions League campaign.

Nørregaard was called up for the January 2007 league national team by national team manager Morten Olsen, which played three unofficial national team games in the United States, El Salvador and Honduras. He played in all three games of the tour, including a 3–1 loss to the United States national team and a 1–0 loss to El Salvador.

In September 2008, after some strong league performances he was called up for the Denmark national team, for the second time, for the matches against Hungary and Portugal to help Denmark in their 2010 FIFA World Cup qualification campaign. However, in the match against Hungary, he wasn't even named among the substitutions.

On 4 January 2011, Nørregaard signed a deal with the Danish club AGF. The contract was for three and a half years.

In August 2014, Nørregaard moved to Vendsyssel on a free transfer.

On 10 October 2020, Nørregaard was appointed as the interim manager of Copenhagen after Ståle Solbakken was sacked.

== Honours ==
Copenhagen

- Danish Superliga: 2002–03, 2003–04, 2006–07, 2008–09, 2009–10; runner-up: 2004–05
- Danish Cup: 2003–04, 2008–09; runner up: 2006–07
- Danish Super Cup: 2004
- Royal League: 2004–05; runner-up: 2006–07

Individual

- København player of the year: 2005, 2009
- København Hall of fame: 2006
- Danish Cup Fighter: 2004
