= Christian Traoré =

Danish footballer (born 1982)

Personal information
- Date of birth: April 18, 1982 (age 44)
- Place of birth: Copenhagen, Denmark
- Height: 1.80 m (5 ft 11 in)
- Position: Defender

Senior career*
Years	Team	Apps	(Gls)
2000–2005	FC Copenhagen	37	(0)
2002	→ Hammarby IF (loan)	8	(0)
2005–2007	FC Midtjylland	10	(0)
2007–2010	Hammarby IF	76	(3)
2010	→ Hønefoss BK (loan)	13	(0)
2011	Randers FC	7	(0)
2011–2012	Lyngby BK	11	(0)
2012–2015	HB Køge	11	(0)
- * Club domestic league appearances and goals

Christian Traoré (born 18 April 1982) is a Danish retired football defender. Besides Denmark, he has played in Sweden. He has played on the teams of FC Midtjylland, Randers FC, Hammarby IF, Hønefoss BK, F.C. Copenhagen, HB Køge and Lyngby Boldklub.

== Personal life ==
Traoré was born in Denmark and is of mixed Danish and Guinean descent.

== Honours ==
F.C. Copenhagen

- Danish Cup: 2003–04
- Danish Super Cup: 2004
