= Martin Bergvold =

Danish footballer (born 1984)

Personal information
- Date of birth: 20 February 1984 (age 42)
- Place of birth: Copenhagen, Denmark
- Height: 1.84 m (6 ft 0 in)
- Position: Midfielder

Youth career
- 1996–1999: Rødovre Boldklub
- 1999–2001: Avarta
- 2001–2002: KB

Senior career*
Years	Team	Apps	(Gls)
2002–2007	Copenhagen	64	(6)
2007–2010	Livorno	66	(6)
2010–2012	Copenhagen	11	(0)
2012	→ Lyngby (loan)	11	(0)
2012–2014	Esbjerg fB	27	(0)
2015–2016	Vendsyssel	34	(4)
2016–2017	Livorno	4	(0)
2017	HB Tórshavn	11	(1)

International career
2000	Denmark U16	3	(0)
2000–2001	Denmark U17	14	(1)
2002	Denmark U18	1	(0)
2001–2003	Denmark U19	18	(1)
2003–2004	Denmark U20	4	(0)
2004–2006	Denmark U21	18	(2)
- * Club domestic league appearances and goals as of 11 September 2020 (UTC)

Martin Bergvold (born 20 February 1984) is a Danish former professional footballer, who played as a midfielder. He has played 18 games and scored two goals for the Denmark under-21 national team, and was named 2000 Danish Under-17 Player of the Year.

== Career ==
Bergvold started playing football with small clubs Rødovre Boldklub and Boldklubben Avarta. He moved to Kjøbenhavns Boldklub (KB), the reserve team of FC Copenhagen of the top-flight Danish Superliga. Bergvold played for various Danish national teams, regularly featuring as team captain, and he won the 2000 Danish Under-17 Player of the Year award.

He made his senior debut for Copenhagen in December 2002, and was a member of the squad which won the 2002–03 Superliga championship. He scored his first goal for the club in March 2004, as the club repeated the championship win in the 2003–04 Superliga season. He also scored in the 2004 Danish Cup tournament, though he did not play the cup final, which Copenhagen won 1–0 against AaB. Bergvold played 22 of Copenhagen's 33 games in the 2005–06 Superliga season, which the club went on to win, and he was selected to represent the Danish under-21 national team at the 2006 European Under-21 Championship in May 2006. He played in all Denmark's three matches before elimination.

In January 2007, he moved abroad to play for Italian club Livorno. He made his debut in the Serie A in a 1–2 loss to Fiorentina on 28 January. Livorno finished last in the 2007–08 Serie A season, and was relegated to the Serie B. Bergvold stayed at Livorno, and made 30 appearances in the 2008–09 Serie B season to help Livorno win promotion for the Serie A.

After playing a few years in Denmark, where he played for Copenhagen, Lyngby, Esbjerg fB and Vendsyssel FF, he returned to Livorno in 2016.

In February 2017, Bergvold moved to Faroese club HB Tórshavn. After making 11 appearances for the side and scoring one goal, he retired from football.

== Honours ==
FC Copenhagen

- Danish Superliga: 2002–03, 2003–04, 2005–06, 2010–11
- Danish Cup: 2003–04
- Danish Super Cup: 2004
- Royal League: 2004–05, 2005–06

Individual

- Danish Under-17 Player of the Year: 2000
