= Michael Silberbauer =

Danish footballer and manager (born 1981)

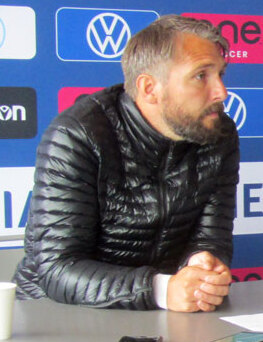
- Silberbauer in 2019

Personal information
- Full name: Michael Kappelgaard Silberbauer
- Date of birth: 7 July 1981 (age 45)
- Place of birth: Støvring, Denmark
- Height: 1.83 m (6 ft 0 in)
- Position: Midfielder

Team information
- Current team: Mainz 05 (assistant)

Youth career
- Støvring IF

Senior career*
Years	Team	Apps	(Gls)
2000–2003	AaB	105	(20)
2004–2008	Copenhagen	129	(19)
2008–2011	Utrecht	90	(6)
2011–2014	Young Boys	31	(1)
2012–2013	→ OB (loan)	24	(1)
2014–2015	Biel-Bienne	23	(0)
Total		402	(47)

International career
1997	Denmark U17	12	(2)
1998–1999	Denmark U19	8	(2)
2002	Denmark U20	5	(1)
2000–2003	Denmark U21	24	(2)
2002–2012	Denmark	25	(1)

Managerial career
- 2015–2016: Biel-Bienne (assistant)
- 2016–2019: Luzern (assistant)
- 2018–2019: Pacific FC
- 2020–2021: Midtjylland (U-19 assistant)
- 2021: Basel (assistant)
- 2022: Utrecht (assistant)
- 2022: Midtjylland (assistant)
- 2022–2023: Utrecht
- 2024–: Mainz 05 (assistant)
- * Club domestic league appearances and goals

Michael Silberbauer (born 7 July 1981) is a Danish football manager and former professional player. He is currently assistant coach at 1. FSV Mainz 05.

Silberbauer played more than 100 games for Danish clubs AaB and Copenhagen, winning three Danish Superliga titles with Copenhagen. He was capped 25 times for the Denmark national team, scoring a single goal. Silberbauer also played abroad for Dutch club Utrecht and Swiss clubs Young Boys and Biel-Bienne.

== Club career ==
=== Aalborg BK ===
Born in Støvring, Silberbauer started his career playing youth football for local amateur team Støvring IF, before moving to nearby top-flight club AaB. He made his Danish Superliga debut for AaB in the 3–2 win against defending Superliga champions Herfølge on 26 July 2000, and he played 28 of 33 games during the 2000–01 Danish Superliga season. Silberbauer played a total 105 Superliga games for AaB until December 2003, and was named AaB player of the year in both 2001 and 2002.

=== Copenhagen ===
In January 2004, Silberbauer moved on to Superliga rivals Copenhagen, in a deal reportedly worth between 7–10 million DKK. In his first six months with Copenhagen, he won both the 2003–04 Danish Superliga championship and the 2003–04 Danish Cup trophy. In the spring of 2005, he was in top form, scoring four goals in two games, before he suffered an injury in a game against arch rivals Brøndby. He won a further two Danish Superliga titles, before leaving the club as his contract expired in the summer of 2008.

=== Utrecht ===
Silberbauer then moved abroad to play for Eredivisie club Utrecht. He was eventually named team captain of Utrecht, and was seen as a leader figure for the young team. With his contract running out in the summer of 2011, Utrecht looked to sell him in the winter 2010 transfer window, with a number of British clubs reportedly interested.

=== Young Boys ===
Silberbauer was not sold, and eventually agreed a free transfer move to Swiss Super League club Young Boys in April 2011, effective from July 2011. Silberbauer was contracted until 2015, but returned on loan to Odense until summer 2013.

=== Odense ===
Silberbauer joined OB 3 September 2012 on a one-year loan contract.

== International career ==
At the age of 16, Silberbauer made his international debut for the Danish under-17 national team in August 1997. He participated in the 1998 European Under-16 Championship. Up until November 2003, he played a total 56 games and scored seven goals for the various Danish youth selections, including 24 games and two goals for the Danish under-21 national team.

Silberbauer was selected for the senior Danish national team under national team manager Morten Olsen, and made his debut in the 1–0 friendly game win against Scotland in August 2002. It would be two-and-a-half years and a move to FCK before he added the second game to his tally. It came in March 2005, as he took part in the 3–0 win against Kazakhstan in the 2006 FIFA World Cup qualification tournament. Silberbauer scored his first international goal in his fourth game, a 1–0 friendly win against Finland in June 2005. It came as a surprise to many commentators that Silberbauer was not included in Olsen's squad for the 2010 FIFA World Cup, and Silberbauer himself was so disappointed that he considered ending his international career. Following the World Cup, he was called up for the national team again.

Silberbauer also represented the Denmark League XI national team, a selection of the best domestic Danish Superliga players managed by Morten Olsen for a number of unofficial international matches. Silberbauer played an aggregated seven games and scored one goal for the League XI team in 2002, 2004, and 2006.

== Coaching career ==
Silberbauer became an assistant at Swiss Super League club Luzern in 2016. He remained with the club through the 2018–19 Swiss Super League season.

On 20 August 2018, Silberbauer was announced as the first head coach of Pacific FC of the Canadian Premier League on a two-year contract, beginning January 2019. On 28 April 2019, he coached Pacific to a 1–0 victory in its first ever game over HFX Wanderers. He parted ways with the club on 18 October the same year.

On 17 August 2020 it was confirmed, that Silberbauer had returned to Denmark and joined Midtjylland as an assistant coach for the club's successful U-19 team.

On 15 June 2021, Swiss club Basel announced that Silberbauer had been hired on a deal for the 2021–22 season, as the club's new assistant coach under head coach Patrick Rahmen. He left the club at the end of 2022. On 24 March 2022, he joined Utrecht, also as assistant, under manager Rick Kruys. Ahead of the 2022–23 season, Silberbauer returned to his homeland and joined his former club, Midtjylland, as a first team assistant coach.

On 28 December 2022, Silberbauer returned to Utrecht, this time as head coach, agreeing upon a 2.5-year contract.

On 29 August 2023, Silberbauer was fired after losing the first three Eredivisie matches.

On 14 February 2024 German Bundesliga club Mainz 05 confirmed that Silberbauer had joined the club as assistant coach under Danish head coach Bo Henriksen, whom he knew from their time together at FC Midtjylland.

== Career statistics ==
Scores and results list Denmark's goal tally first

Goal	Date	Venue	Opponent	Score	Result	Competition
1	2 June 2005	Tampere, Finland	Finland	1–0	1–0	Friendly match

== Managerial statistics ==
As of matches played 26 August 2023

Managerial record by team and tenure
Team	From	To	Record								Ref
Team	From	To	G	W	D	L	GF	GA	GD	Win %	Ref
Pacific FC	20 August 2018	18 October 2019	29	7	7	15	34	50	−16	24.14	
Utrecht	28 December 2022	29 August 2023	28	11	6	11	40	42	−2	39.29	
Career totals			57	18	13	26	74	92	−18	31.58	

== Honours ==
Copenhagen

- Danish Superliga: 2003–04, 2005–06, 2006–07
- Danish Cup: 2003–04
- Danish Super Cup: 2004
