= 2006–07 Royal League =

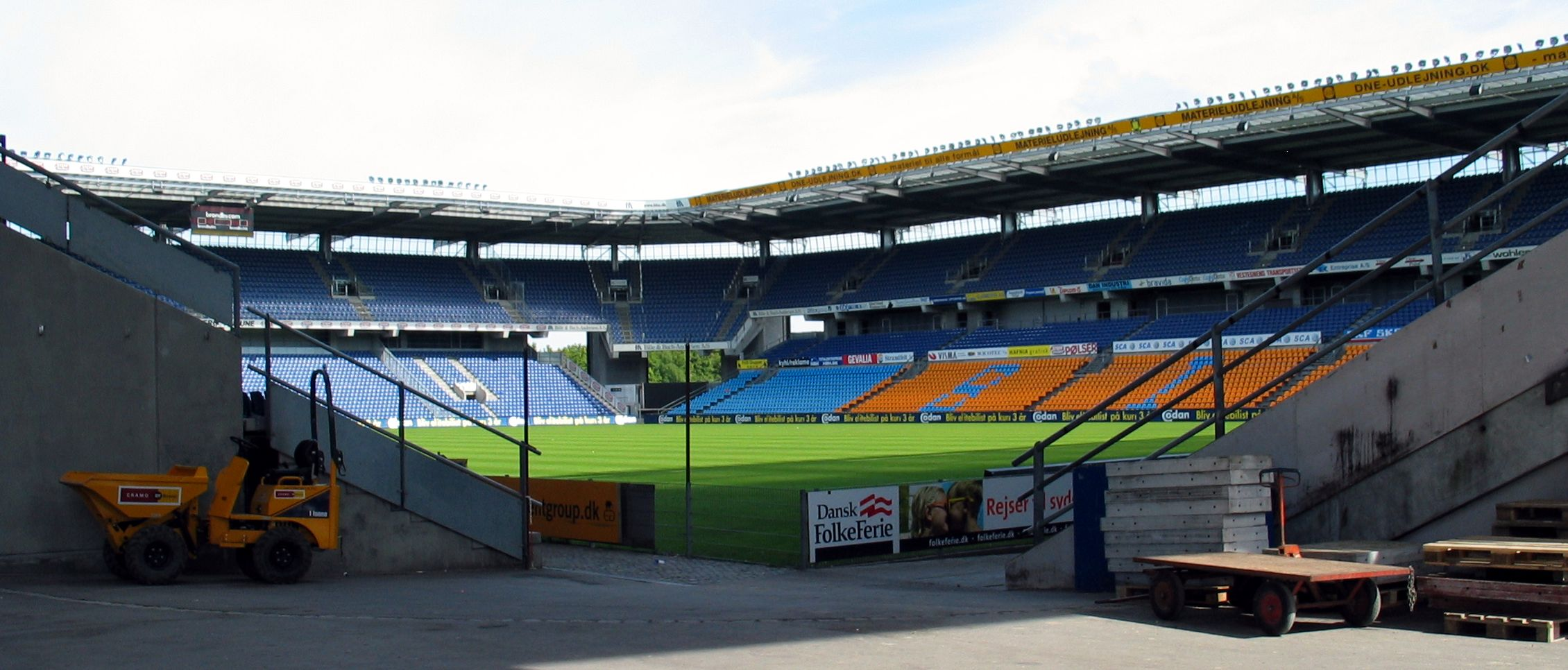
- Brøndby Stadium in Copenhagen hosted the final

Tournament details
- Dates: 9 November 2006 – 15 March 2007
- Teams: 12 (from 3 associations)

Final positions
- Champions: (Denmark) Brøndby (1st title)
- Runners-up: (Denmark) Copenhagen

Tournament statistics
- Matches played: 43
- Goals scored: 131 (3.05 per match)
- Top scorer(s): (Sweden) Martin Ericsson (Norway) Jan-Derek Sørensen (6 goals each)

The 2006–07 Royal League fixtures and results.

== Rules ==
The twelve participating teams are placed into three groups of four clubs each. The teams of each group face each other home and away. The group winners and runners-up qualify for the quarter-finals, along with the two best third placed teams. As opposed to the previous edition of the tournament, the knock-out stages are played as single legs. In the quarter-final draw, teams from the same group or the same country are, as far as possible, not paired together.

== Bonuses ==
Prize money for the tournament are paid like this:

- Qualification for the tournament itself: 1,000,000 DKK
- Qualification for the quarter finals,
  - through the first place of the group: 600,000 DKK
  - through the second place of the group: 300,000 DKK
  - through the third place of the group: 150,000 DKK (no bonus is given for third-place finishers that do not qualify)
- Match bonuses
  - Group phase victory: 125,000 DKK
  - Group phase draw: 62,500 DKK
  - Quarter-final victory: 350,000 DKK
  - Semi-final victory: 400,000 DKK
  - Final victory (Royal League champion): 2,000,000 DKK
  - Final loss (Royal League runner-up): 500,000 DKK

=== Spectator bonuses ===
Another potential 8 million DKK are up for grabs through two separate spectator bonuses:

Bonus no. 1 pays a maximum of 6.3 million DKK total, based on the average home attendance in the Royal League compared against the clubs' average attendance in their respective league:

- An average of more than 60% pays 525,000 DKK
- More than 55% pays 450,000 DKK
- More than 50% pays 375,000 DKK
- More than 45% pays 225,000 DKK
- More than 40% pays 150,000 DKK
- More than 35% pays 75,000 DKK

Bonus no. 2 distributes 1.7 million DKK between clubs in relation to a club's average home attendance in the Royal League. A certain average gives a certain amount of shares:

- An average of more than 5,000 spectators gives the club 4 shares out of the 1.7 million total
- More than 6,000 spectators gives 8 shares
- More than 7,000 spectators gives 12 shares
- More than 8,000 spectators gives 16 shares
- More than 9,000 spectators gives 24 shares
- More than 10,000 spectators gives 32 shares

After the tournament, the money will be distributed in relation to how many shares the different clubs have.

== Group stage ==
Location of teams of the 2006–07 Royal League group stage.
Blue: Group 1; Red: Group 2; Green: Group 3.

The group stage started the week following the last day of the Norwegian and Swedish championships (5 November), and was scheduled to end 10 December. However, some group matches were moved to February due to the participation of FC Copenhagen in UEFA Champions League, and that of Odense BK in the UEFA Cup.

Tiebreakers, if necessary, are applied in the following order:

1. Goal difference in all group matches.
2. Goals scored in all group matches.
3. Goals scored in all away group matches.
4. Draw.

=== Group 1 ===
Pos	Team	Pld	W	D	L	GF	GA	GD	Pts	Qualification
1	(Denmark) Odense BK	6	4	1	1	13	7	+6	13	Advanced to knockout stage
2	(Norway) SK Brann	6	2	3	1	13	11	+2	9	Advanced to knockout stage
3	(Sweden) Helsingborgs IF	6	2	3	1	8	8	0	9	Advanced to knockout stage
4	(Norway) Rosenborg BK	6	0	1	5	7	15	−8	1	

Thu 9 November	19:30	Rosenborg	1–3	Brann	Lerkendal stadion	Att: 5,755
Sun 19 November	16:00	Helsingborg	3–1	Rosenborg	Olympia	Att: 4,412
Sun 26 November	15:00	Brann	2–2	Helsingborg	Brann Stadion	Att: 3,535
	17:00	Odense	5–3	Rosenborg	Fionia Park	Att: 2,858
Sun 3 December	13:55	Brann	1–1	Odense	Brann Stadion	Att: 2,432
	18:00	Rosenborg	0–0	Helsingborg	Lerkendal stadion	Att: 4,618
Thu 7 December	19:00	Helsingborg	1–0	Odense	Olympia	Att: 2,430
	19:30	Brann	3–2	Rosenborg	Brann Stadion	Att: 3,152
Sun 10 December	15:55	Rosenborg	0–1	Odense	Lerkendal stadion	Att: 4,106
	16:00	Helsingborg	2–2	Brann	Österås IP (Hässleholm)	Att: 2,944
Sun 18 February	15:00	Odense	3–0	Helsingborg	Fionia Park	Att: 3,726
Sun 25 February	15:00	Odense	3–2	Brann	Fionia Park	Att: 3,004

=== Group 2 ===
Pos	Team	Pld	W	D	L	GF	GA	GD	Pts	Qualification
1	(Norway) Lillestrøm SK	6	3	3	0	7	3	+4	12	Advanced to knockout stage
2	(Denmark) Brøndby IF	6	3	2	1	10	8	+2	11	Advanced to knockout stage
3	(Denmark) FC Copenhagen	6	3	0	3	9	5	+4	9	Advanced to knockout stage
4	(Sweden) Hammarby IF	6	0	1	5	5	15	−10	1	

Sat 18 November	15:00	Hammarby	1–1	Lillestrøm	Söderstadion	Att: 5,399
Thu 23 November	18:55	Hammarby	2–3	Brøndby	Söderstadion	Att: 4,443
Sun 26 November	15:00	Lillestrøm	2–0	Hammarby	Åråsen Stadion	Att: 1,981
Thu 30 November	18:55	Brøndby	3–1	Hammarby	Brøndby Stadion	Att: 4,966
	19:30	Lillestrøm	1–0	Copenhagen	Åråsen Stadion	Att: 2,161
Sun 3 December	16:00	Copenhagen	0–1	Lillestrøm	Parken	Att: 7,149
Thu 7 December	18:55	Lillestrøm	1–1	Brøndby	Åråsen Stadion	Att: 1,447
Sun 10 December	18:00	Brøndby	1–1	Lillestrøm	Brøndby Stadion	Att: 5,546
	20:00	Hammarby	1–2	Copenhagen	Söderstadion	Att: 4,108
Sun 11 February	17:00	Copenhagen	0–1	Brøndby	Parken	Att: 17,019
Sun 18 February	17:00	Brøndby	1–3	Copenhagen	Brøndby Stadion	Att: 18,496
Sun 25 February	17:00	Copenhagen	4–0	Hammarby	Parken	Att: 7,139

=== Group 3 ===
Pos	Team	Pld	W	D	L	GF	GA	GD	Pts	Qualification
1	(Norway) Vålerenga IF	6	4	2	0	13	8	+5	14	Advanced to knockout stage
2	(Sweden) IF Elfsborg	6	2	2	2	11	8	+3	8	Advanced to knockout stage
3	(Sweden) AIK	6	1	3	2	7	13	−6	6	
4	(Denmark) Viborg FF	6	0	3	3	6	8	−2	3	

Sun 12 November	13:30	Elfsborg	4–0	AIK	Borås Arena	Att: 3,375
Sun 19 November	16:00	Vålerenga	2–1	Elfsborg	Bislett stadion	Att: 3,058
Thu 23 November	19:00	Vålerenga	1–0	Viborg	Bislett stadion	Att: 2,040
Sun 26 November	15:00	Viborg	2–2	Elfsborg	Viborg Stadion	Att: 3,358
	16:00	AIK	1–1	Vålerenga	Råsunda stadion	Att: 4,512
Thu 30 November	19:00	AIK	1–1	Viborg	Råsunda stadion	Att: 3,453
Sat 2 December	16:00	Elfsborg	1–0	Viborg	Borås Arena	Att: 3,608
Sun 3 December	16:00	Vålerenga	4–2	AIK	Bislett stadion	Att: 3,269
Thu 7 December	19:00	AIK	1–1	Elfsborg	Råsunda stadion	Att: 6,221
	19:00	Viborg	2–2	Vålerenga	Viborg Stadion	Att: 2,786
Sun 10 December	15:00	Viborg	1–2	AIK	Viborg Stadion	Att: 2,757
	16:00	Elfsborg	2–3	Vålerenga	Borås Arena	Att: 5,605

=== 3rd placed teams ===
Pos	Team	Pld	W	D	L	GF	GA	GD	Pts	Qualification
1	(Denmark) FC Copenhagen	6	3	0	3	9	5	+4	9	Advanced to knockout stage
2	(Sweden) Helsingborgs IF	6	2	3	1	8	8	0	9	Advanced to knockout stage
3	(Sweden) AIK	6	1	3	2	7	12	−5	6	

== Knockout stage ==
Quarter-finals
1 March – Brøndby (Brøndby Stadion)
(Denmark) Brøndby	3
(Norway) Brann	0
1 March – Odense (Fionia Park)
(Denmark) Odense (aet) (pen)	2 (4)
(Norway) Lillestrøm	2 (1)
4 March – Borås (Borås Arena)
(Sweden) Elfsborg	1
(Denmark) Copenhagen	2
4 March – Oslo (Bislett Stadion)
(Norway) Vålerenga	1
(Sweden) Helsingborg	2

Semi-finals
8 March – Brøndby (Brøndby Stadion)
(Denmark) Brøndby (aet)	2
(Denmark) Odense	1
8 March – Copenhagen (Parken)
(Denmark) Copenhagen	3
(Sweden) Helsingborg	1

Final
15 March – Brøndby (Brøndby Stadion)
(Denmark) Brøndby	1
(Denmark) Copenhagen	0

=== Quarter-finals ===
1 March 2007
19:00

Brøndby (Denmark)	3–0	(Norway) Brann
Ericsson 27' (pen.); Rasmussen 67'; Katongo 69'

Brøndby Stadion, Brøndby
Attendance: 5,471
Referee: Martin Hansson (Sweden)

1 March 2007
19:30

Vålerenga (Norway)	1–2	(Sweden) Helsingborg
Roberts 9'		Olsson 79'; Karekezi 82'

Bislett Stadion, Oslo
Attendance: 2,193
Referee: Claus Bo Larsen (Denmark)

4 March 2007
16:00

Odense (Denmark)	2–2 (a.e.t.)	(Norway) Lillestrøm
Fevang 15'; Borring 108'		Myklebust 11'; Søgård 94'
Penalties
Sørensen (penalty scored); Laursen (penalty scored); Borring (penalty scored); Fevang (penalty scored)	4–1	(penalty missed) Brenne; (penalty scored) Mouelhi; (penalty missed) Sundgot

Fionia Park, Odense
Attendance: 4,436
Referee: Stefan Johannesson (Sweden)

4 March 2007
16:55

Elfsborg (Sweden)	1–2	(Denmark) Copenhagen
Holmén 51' (pen.)		Nørregaard 20'; Silberbauer 48'

Borås Arena, Borås
Attendance: 6,703
Referee: Tom Henning Øvrebø (Norway)

=== Semi-finals ===
8 March 2007
16:55

Copenhagen (Denmark)	3–1	(Sweden) Helsingborg
Berglund 5', 15'; Ailton 32'		Jakobsson 19'

Parken, Copenhagen
Attendance: 6,642
Referee: Terje Hauge (Norway)

8 March 2007
19:00

Brøndby (Denmark)	2–1 (a.e.t.)	(Denmark) Odense
Nielsen 78'; Ericsson 104'		Fevang 66'

Brøndby Stadion, Brøndby
Attendance: 10,732
Referee: Martin Ingvarsson (Sweden)

=== Final ===
15 March 2007
19:00

Brøndby (Denmark)	1–0	(Denmark) Copenhagen
Ericsson 38' (pen.)

Brøndby Stadion, Brøndby
Attendance: 17,914
Referee: Tom Henning Øvrebø (Norway)

2006–07 champions

First title

== Top scorers ==
Goal scorer	Team	Goals
(Sweden) Martin Ericsson	Brøndby	6
(Norway) Jan-Derek Sørensen	Vålerenga	6
(Sweden) Fredrik Berglund	Copenhagen	4
(Norway) Morten Fevang	Odense	4
(Norway) Øyvind Storflor	Rosenborg	4
(Sweden) Denni Avdic	Elfsborg	3
(Denmark) Kim Christensen	Odense	3
(Sweden) Samuel Holmén	Elfsborg	3
(Norway) Erik Huseklepp	Brann	3
(Rwanda) Olivier Karekezi	Helsingborg	3
(Jamaica) Luton Shelton	Helsingborg	3
(Denmark) Michael Silberbauer	Copenhagen	3
(Norway) M. Waade Myklebust	Lillestrøm	3
(Australia) David Williams	Brøndby	3

Preceded by 2005–06	Royal League; 2006–07	Succeeded by —
