= Klaus Nørregaard =

Danish footballer (born 1952)

Personal information
- Date of birth: 4 October 1952 (age 74)
- Place of birth: Frederiksberg, Denmark
- Position: Midfielder

Youth career
- Hvidovre

Senior career*
Years	Team	Apps	(Gls)
1972–1974	Hvidovre		
1976–1977	KB		
1978	Hellerup		
1978–1980	KB		
1981–1982	Hvidovre		
1983	Brøndby		

International career
	Denmark U21	1	(0)
1977–1980	Denmark	9	(1)
- * Club domestic league appearances and goals

Klaus Nørregaard (born 4 October 1952) is a Danish footballer who played as a midfielder for Hvidovre and KB and the Denmark national team in the 1970s.

== Playing career ==
=== Club career ===
Born in Frederiksberg on 4 October 1952, Klaus Nørregaard grew up in Spurvegården, where he joined the youth ranks of Hvidovre and made his first-team debut on 10 May 1972 in a tournament match at home against Randers. He stayed with the club for four years, until 1976, playing a total of 121 matches for HIF's first team. During this period, his career was briefly interrupted by his military service on Bornholm, where he played for Svaneke.

A few years later, Nørregaard helped KB win the Danish championship in 1980, before returning to HIF for the 1981 and 1982 seasons. He retired at Brøndby in 1983, with whom he played in eight top-flight matches.

=== International career ===
During his time with KB, Nørregaard earned a total of nine international caps for Denmark, making his debut on 2 February 1977 in a friendly match against Senegal, in which he came off the bench to score the winner (3–2). His nine caps came in the form of six friendlies, one Euro 1980 qualifier, and two in the 1978–80 Nordic Football Championship, which Denmark went on to win. He also played one match each for Denmark U21 and Denmark B.

== Later life ==
As of 2012, the 60-year-old Nørregaard was living in Rødovre. His son, Hjalte Nørregaard, also represented the Danish national team.

== Honours ==
=== Club ===
KB

- Danish championship
  - Champions (1): 1980

=== International ===
Denmark

- Nordic Football Championship
  - Champions (1): 1978–80
