= Jeppe Brandrup =

Danish footballer (born 1985)

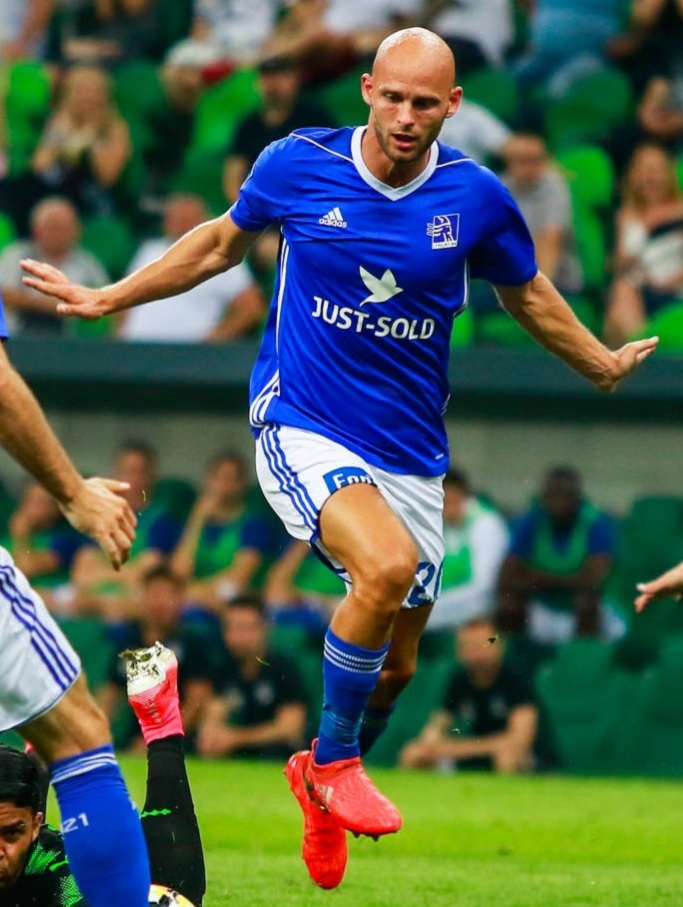
- Brandrup with Lyngby in 2017

Personal information
- Full name: Jeppe Feldsted Brandrup
- Date of birth: 3 June 1985 (age 41)
- Place of birth: Copenhagen, Denmark
- Height: 1.80 m (5 ft 11 in)
- Positions: Central midfielder; right back; right wing back

Youth career
- Skjold
- Boldklubben 1893
- KB

Senior career*
Years	Team	Apps	(Gls)
2005–2007	Copenhagen	4	(0)
2007–2009	Randers	20	(1)
2008–2009	→ Silkeborg (loan)	8	(0)
2009–2018	Lyngby	232	(7)
2019	HIK	6	(0)

International career
2001–2002	Denmark U-17	13	(2)
2002	Denmark U-18	3	(1)
2003–2004	Denmark U-19	10	(0)
2004–2005	Denmark U-20	6	(0)
- * Club domestic league appearances and goals as of 13 April 2019

Jeppe Feldsted Brandrup (born 3 June 1985) is a Danish former professional football player. He played the positions as right-footed defender and right wingback as well as central midfielder.

Brandrup played in KB, one of the two clubs behind F.C. Copenhagen, since his early childhood. While at KB, he made his debut for the Danish youth national teams in September 2001 and played 4 matches at the 2002 UEFA European Under-17 Football Championship.

Jeppe was promoted to the first team in 2005. He debuted on 2005-08-07 against Aarhus GF where he Álvaro Santos on the left winger position. Jeppe did not score for FCK.

== Honours ==
- Danish Superliga: 2005-06 & 2006-07 (with Copenhagen)
