= Jamil Fearrington =

Danish footballer (born 1986)

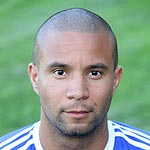

Personal information
- Date of birth: 20 April 1986 (age 40)
- Place of birth: Copenhagen, Denmark
- Height: 1.86 m (6 ft 1 in)
- Position: Defender

Youth career
- –2005: Vanløse
- 2005–2007: KB

Senior career*
Years	Team	Apps	(Gls)
2004–2006	KB	51	(8)
2006	Copenhagen	1	(0)
2006–2007	KB	25	(4)
2007	Stavanger	13	(0)
2008	Sandnes Ulf	11	(0)
2009	Frem	10	(0)
2009–2010	Roskilde	26	(1)
2010	Stenløse	9	(0)
2011	Rishøj	10	(1)
2011–2012	Fremad Amager	26	(2)
2012–2013	Skjold Birkerød	30	(2)
2013–2015	Arendal	35	(4)
2015	Fram Larvik	5	(4)
2015–2021	Brønshøj	129	(12)

International career
2004	Denmark U18	1	(0)
2004	Denmark U19	5	(0)

Managerial career
- 2020–2021: Brønshøj (player-assistant)
- 2025-: Brønshøj (head coach)
- * Club domestic league appearances and goals

Jamil James Fearrington (born 20 April 1986) is a Danish former professional footballer who played as a defender. He has represented Denmark internationally at various youth levels. He's currently the head coach of Brønshøj BK.

== Football career ==
Fearrington started playing football in Vanløse IF and eventually became a part of the first youth team. He later moved to the youth team of Kjøbenhavns Boldklub, the reserve team of multiple Danish champions F.C. Copenhagen (FCK). In the autumn 2006 he was included in the FCK first team, but only played a single official match for the team in the TELE2 Liga Cup against Brøndby IF. He had several unofficial games in the Viasat Cup and exhibition matches.

Jamil Fearrington is only the eighth American to be registered for Champions League play.

In March 2007, he had an unsuccessful trial with the American team D.C. United. In July 2007 he moved to Norwegian Stavanger I.F. After a successful six months in Stavanger, Jamil Fearrington was signed by 1. division club, Sandnes Ulf, in mid-January 2008, he left the club at the end of the year 2008 and signed on 6 March 2009 with Boldklubben Frem. In 2009, he was invited for trials with both Real Salt Lake and Los Angeles Galaxy. He played a solid exhibition match for Galaxy against FC Heridiano, which attracted interest from several North American clubs.

In August, 2009, Fearrington signed with Danish 1. division club, FC Roskilde. After one year in Roskilde, he canceled the contract and signed a six-month deal with Danish 2. division club Stenløse BK. In 2011, he left Stenløse BK and signed with another 2. division club Rishøj Boldklub. By the end of the season Fearrington signed a one-year deal with tradition club Fremad Amager.

When his deal with Fremad Amager expired, he moved to Skjold Birkerød and signed a one-year contract. There he played every minute of every game of the season.

In July 2013, Fearrington made another move to Norwegian football, when he signed a deal with Arendal Fotball for the remainder of the season. The team moved from dead last and ended the season in top of the league. After the season Fearrington signed a new contract with the club for the 2014 season.

In July 2015, Fearrington joined Brønshøj BK where he was named captain and continued to play more than a 100 games until his retirement. Fearrington was named the 2018 Player of the Year.

== International ==
He can play practically any position on the field, but prefers playing right back, central midfield or center back. Jamil has publicly stated his intention to play for the US National Team.

== Coaching career ==
On 18 July 2020 it was confirmed, that Fearrington had retired and would continue at Brønshøj BK as an assistant coach. However, due to Brønshøj's bad results, Fearrington came in on the pitch as substitute for two games in October and November 2020. Brønshøj announced on 16 January 2021, that Jamil had left the club and would move to the United States.

In April 2025 Fearrington was announced as the head coach for Brønshøj BK.
