= Benny Gall =

Danish footballer and manager (born 1971)

Personal information
- Date of birth: 14 March 1971 (age 55)
- Place of birth: Copenhagen, Denmark
- Height: 1.91 m (6 ft 3 in)
- Position: Goalkeeper

Team information
- Current team: Avarta (Manager)

Youth career
- Brønshøj
- KB
- Brønshøj

Senior career*
Years	Team	Apps	(Gls)
1990	Fremad Amager		
1991–1992	Copenhagen		
1992–1994	Brønshøj	30	(0)
1994–1995	Dordrecht'90	48	(0)
1996	De Graafschap	0	(0)
1996–1998	Shrewsbury Town	34	(0)
1999–2001	Esbjerg fB	91	(0)
2001–2007	Copenhagen	8	(0)

International career
1990	Denmark U-21	1	(0)

Managerial career
- 2003–2007: KB (player-coach)
- 2008–2009: B.93
- 2010–2013: Elite 3000 Helsingør
- 2014–2015: AB (assistant)
- 2015–2018: Avarta
- 2018–2019: Skjold Birkerød (assistant)
- 2019–2021: Skjold Birkerød
- 2021–: Avarta
- * Club domestic league appearances and goals

Benny Gall (born 14 March 1971) is a Danish former footballer who played as a goalkeeper, and the current head coach of fourth tier Denmark Series club BK Avarta.

He has previously been the manager of B93's 2nd Division East team and Elite 3000 Helsingør, BK Avarta. Before his job at B.93, he was the manager of F.C. Copenhagen's reserve team, Kjøbenhavns Boldklub. He also worked as an assistant coach at Akademisk Boldklub (AB).

Gall, had a sporadically successful playing career in Denmark and a spell, with Shrewsbury Town in England when they were in Division Three. Galls first club was BK Fremad Amager near his home town of Copenhagen. Spells at Brønshøj BK, Dordrecht 90 and De Graafschap followed, before he moved across to England to join up with Jake Kings Shrewsbury Town. While not an overly successful period in the club's history, Gall managed almost 40 appearances as he battled for the 1st team jersey with Paul Edwards. By 2001, Gall had returned to his native Denmark finishing his career with F.C. Copenhagen in a player coach capacity.

== Honours ==
FC Copenhagen

- Danish Superliga: 2002-03, 2003-04, 2005-06 & 2006-07
- Danish Super Cup: 2001
