= Lasse Qvist =

Danish footballer (born 1987)

Personal information
- Date of birth: 17 January 1987 (age 39)
- Place of birth: Roskilde, Denmark
- Height: 1.74 m (5 ft 8 1/2 in)
- Position: Centre forward

Youth career
- Himmelev-Veddelev
- –2001: KFUM Roskilde
- 2001–2004: Lyngby BK
- 2004–2005: PSV Eindhoven
- 2005–2006: KB

Senior career*
Years	Team	Apps	(Gls)
2006–2008	FC Copenhagen	8	(2)
2008–2009	Lyngby BK	15	(4)
2009–2011	Nordvest FC	15	(12)
2011	Næstved BK	11	(2)
2012	Víkingur Gøta	8	(1)
2012–2013	FC Helsingør	1	(1)
2013–2015	GVI		

International career
2002	Denmark U-16	3	(2)
2003–2004	Denmark U-17	20	(18)
2004–2005	Denmark U-18	2	(0)
2004–2006	Denmark U-19	16	(2)
2007	Denmark U-21	1	(0)
- * Club domestic league appearances and goals

Lasse Qvist (born 17 January 1987) is a Danish former professional footballer who played as a striker.

== Life and career ==
Born in Roskilde, Qvist started playing football in local clubs Himmelev-Veddelev BK and KFUM Roskilde. From his early years, Lasse Qvist was a fan of F.C. Copenhagen, and as an 8-year-old boy, he had an FCK-shirt with the number 11 and his name printed on the back.

Aged 14, Qvist moved to Lyngby BK and went on to play for various Danish youth national teams. He scored 18 goals in 20 matches for the Danish under-17 national team, and won the 2003 Danish Under-17 Player of the Year award. He also played at the 2003 UEFA European Under-17 Football Championship. After three years at Lyngby, he moved to the youth academy of Dutch team PSV Eindhoven. He had a hard time getting any social contacts with his PSV teammates, as most of them lived in Belgium and went home straight after training.

Qvist moved back to Denmark in 2005, and went on to play for Kjøbenhavns Boldklub, the reserve team of F.C. Copenhagen. In November 2006, Qvist got his first team début for FCK, when he played the last 30 minutes of the Royal League match against Lillestrøm S.K. at Åråsen Stadium. He later played for Nordvest FC, Næstved BK, and FC Helsingør.

After two years with GVI, in 2015, Qvist ended his playing career and moved to become GVI's second-team coach.

== Honours ==
Copenhagen

- Danish Superliga: 2006-07

Individual

- 2003 Danish under-17 Player of the Year
