= Thomas Villadsen =

Danish footballer

Personal information
- Full name: Thomas Villadsen
- Date of birth: 4 September 1984 (age 42)
- Place of birth: Copenhagen, Denmark
- Height: 1.84 m (6 ft 0 in)
- Position: Goalkeeper

Team information
- Current team: Lyngby BK (goalkeeper coach)

Youth career
- Vanløse
- 1997–2000: Nordsjælland
- 2000–2006: KB

Senior career*
Years	Team	Apps	(Gls)
2006–2007	F.C. Copenhagen	0	(0)
2007–2009	FC Emmen	61	(0)
2010–2012	Ceahlăul Piatra Neamț	56	(0)
2012–2014	Nordsjælland	0	(0)
2013–2014	→ AC Horsens (loan)	12	(0)
2014–2016	FC Vestsjælland	0	(0)
2015–2016	→ FC Roskilde (loan)	17	(0)
2016–2018	Nykøbing FC	39	(0)
- * Club domestic league appearances and goals

Thomas Villadsen (born 4 September 1984) is a Danish retired professional footballer who played as a goalkeeper and works as goalkeeper coach of Lyngby BK

== Biography ==
Villadsen started in Vanløse IF, and played there until the junior age. He moved to Farum Boldklub, but here were two good keepers on the junior team. He moved on to Kjøbenhavns Boldklub (KB), the reserve team of top-flight Danish Superliga club F.C. Copenhagen. In his time at KB, he was called up for the Danish under-20 and under-21 squads, but served as an unused back-up to Kevin Stuhr Ellegaard.

He served as F.C. Copenhagen's third choice goalkeeper after Magnus Kihlstedt and Benny Gall, while playing in the KB team which won promotion to the Danish 2nd Division in 2005. He signed a full-time contract with F.C. Copenhagen starting April 2006, and continued to play for KB, even scoring a penalty kick goal in a 6–0 win against Greve Fodbold. He played his only competitive game for F.C. Copenhagen in the 2006 Viasat Cup, and was an unused part of the F.C. Copenhagen first-team squad in the championship-winning 2006–07 Superliga season.

As his contract ended in the summer 2007, he signed a contract with the Dutch club FC Emmen in the second-tier Eerste Divisie. In his first season with the club, Villadsen was voted both Eerste Divisie goalkeeper of the year and the FC Emmen player of the year. He did not play any league games for the club, before he moved to Romanian club Ceahlăul Piatra Neamţ in February 2010.

== Coaching career ==
In February 2016, HB Køge signed a contract with DanKeepers DK, which was professional goalkeeper coaching, which was co-owned by Villadsen. Villadsen worked at the club as a coach until the summer of 2018. He worked at HB Køge while he also played for Nykøbing FC.

After retiring, Villadsen became the goalkeeper coach of Lyngby Boldklub. The deal was announced on 7 January 2019.

== Honours ==
Ceahlăul Piatra Neamț

- Liga II: 2010–11
