= Dan Thomassen =

Danish footballer (born 1981)

Personal information
- Full name: Dan Vesterby Thomassen
- Date of birth: 24 March 1981 (age 45)
- Place of birth: Aarhus, Denmark
- Height: 1.87 m (6 ft 2 in)
- Position: Centre-back

Team information
- Current team: Watford (assistant)

Youth career
- 199?–1994: IHF Aarhus
- 1994–1998: AGF

Senior career*
Years	Team	Apps	(Gls)
1999–2004	Padova	87	(0)
2004–2007	Copenhagen	55	(3)
2007–2008	Vålerenga	21	(1)
2008–2011	AGF	55	(3)
2011	Ravenna	0	(0)
2011–2012	Triestina	20	(0)
2012–2014	Este	61	(1)
2014	Campodarsego	0	(0)
2014–2015	Padova	15	(0)
2015–2016	Abano	34	(2)
2016	Vigontina San Paolo	7	(0)
2017–2018	Albignasego		

International career
1997	Denmark U17	9	(0)
1998–2000	Denmark U19	11	(0)
2002	Denmark U20	6	(0)
2002–2003	Denmark U21	15	(1)

Managerial career
- 2023: Vicenza
- * Club domestic league appearances and goals

Dan Vesterby Thomassen (born 24 March 1981) is a Danish former professional footballer and current assistant coach of Serie B club Sampdoria. He has played for Danish Superliga side AGF Aarhus, Norwegian side Vålerenga and Danish champions Copenhagen and Italian side Padova.

== Playing career ==
In his youth, he started playing for IHF Aarhus and later on transferred to AGF. He moved to the Italian club Calcio Padova at the age of 17, and in 2004, he signed a three-year contract with FCK.

In July 2007, he signed for Vålerenga. After one season in Norway, he moved back to his home city to play for AGF.

Shortly after signing with AGF in 2008, he suffered a serious knee injury, which meant he missed a large part of the season.

He moved back to Italy in 2011 to finish his playing career and retired in 2018.

== Coaching career ==
After retiring from active football, Thomassen took up a career as a youth coach, joining Vicenza and covering various training roles, being appointed head coach of the Under-19 team in 2022.

On 16 March 2023, following the dismissal of Francesco Modesto, he was promoted to head coach of Vicenza in the Serie C league for the remainder of the season. Just a month later, on 11 April 2023, he guided Vicenza to win the Coppa Italia Serie C after defeating Juventus F.C. Next Gen in a two-legged final.

In July 2023, Thomassen was announced as the new assistant coach of Brescia, working alongside head coach Daniele Gastaldello. Both Gastaldello and Thomassen were dismissed from their roles on 10 November 2023, following a negative string of results in the Serie B league.

In March 2024, following the appointment of Luca Gotti in charge of Serie A relegation-fighting club Lecce, Thomassen joined the Giallorossi from Salento as their new assistant coach. They managed to keep the club in Serie A for the following season. He left later that year after Gotti was dismissed from his role.

On 26 March 2026, Sampdoria announced the hiring of Thomassen as Attilio Lombardo's new assistant coach.

== Honours ==
=== Player ===
Copenhagen

- 2005–06, 2006–07: Champions

Padova

- 2000–01 Serie C2: Champions
- 2014–15 Serie D: Champions

=== Manager ===
Vicenza

- Coppa Italia Serie C: 2022–23
