= Nicklas Svendsen =

Danish footballer (born 1986)

Personal information
- Full name: Nicklas Nygaard Svendsen
- Date of birth: 11 December 1986 (age 39)
- Place of birth: Copenhagen, Denmark
- Height: 1.85 m (6 ft 1 in)
- Position: Left-back

Youth career
- –2005: B.93
- 2005–2007: KB

Senior career*
Years	Team	Apps	(Gls)
2007–2008	RKC Waalwijk	17	(1)
2009	Frem	?	(?)
2009–2010	HB Køge	9	(0)
2010–2011	Brønshøj	13	(0)
2011–2012	Fremad Amager		
2013–2014	AB Tårnby		

International career
2001	Denmark U16	3	(0)
2002–2003	Denmark U17	19	(0)
2004	Denmark U18	2	(0)
2004–2005	Denmark U19	11	(0)
- * Club domestic league appearances and goals

Nicklas Nygaard Svendsen (born 11 December 1986) is a Danish former professional footballer who played as a left-back. He currently works as executive assistant for the director of football at Danish Superliga club Brøndby IF.

During his active career as a player, he gained 35 caps for various Denmark national youth teams.

== Club career ==
Svendsen progressed through the KB academy in his youth years, after coming from B.93 in 2005. On 2 August 2007, he signed a two-year contract with Dutch club RKC Waalwijk, after having trialled with Emmen. There, he was set to replace the injured Guus de Vries. He made his debut for the club – which was also his professional debut – on 10 August in a 2–2 draw against FC Omniworld. He would, however, struggle with injuries after a relatively successful first season with RKC, and saw diminished playing time in his second season at the club. He made a total of 17 league appearances for the club.

After one-and-a-half year, Svendsen returned to Denmark on 2 February 2009, where he signed a two-year contract with Boldklubben Frem. He spent six months with the club in the second-tier 1st Division, before moving on to HB Køge, where he also penned a two-year deal. On 20 September 2009 in a home match against OB, Svendsen scored two own goals – a league record. He also committed a penalty during the match. He left Køge after one season, after he was deemed superfluous by head coach Aurelijus Skarbalius. One month later, on 25 September 2010, he signed with Brønshøj Boldklub, where he signed until the end of the year. He signed a six-month contract extension when the deal ran out in December 2010. At the end of the season, Svendsen left the club for Fremad Amager, competing in the third-tier 2nd Division. He also played there for one season, before leaving as a free agent in July 2012.

== International career ==
Svendsen has gained 35 caps for various Denmark national youth teams, including 19 appearances for the under-17 team and 11 games for the under-19 team.

== Post-retirement ==
Svendsen retired from football as part of AB Tårnby, and later worked as assistant coach for Tårnby FF. In March 2018, he was appointed executive assistant for the sporting director at Brøndby IF, assisting first Troels Bech, and since Ebbe Sand and Carsten V. Jensen.
