= Morten Bertolt =

Danish footballer (born 1984)

Personal information
- Full name: Morten Bertolt Andersen
- Date of birth: 12 February 1984 (age 42)
- Place of birth: Herlev, Denmark
- Height: 1.84 m (6 ft 0 in)
- Position: Midfielder

Youth career
- 1989–2000: Avarta
- 2000–2004: KB

Senior career*
| Years | Team | Apps | (Gls) |
| 2004–2008 | Copenhagen | 12 | (0) |
| 2006 | → HamKam (loan) | 8 | (1) |
| 2008 | → Viborg (loan) | 10 | (1) |
| 2008–2010 | SønderjyskE | 52 | (2) |
| 2010–2012 | Lyngby | 30 | (1) |
| 2012 | Sandnes Ulf | 11 | (1) |
| 2013–2014 | Vestsjælland | 40 | (1) |
| 2014–2015 | Vendsyssel | 12 | (1) |
| 2015 | Roskilde | 15 | (0) |
| 2015–2016 | Vestsjælland | 11 | (0) |
| 2016–2017 | Helsingør | 26 | (1) |
| Total | | 227 | (9) |

International career
| 2000 | Denmark U16 | 1 | (0) |
| 2003 | Denmark U20 | 5 | (0) |
- * Club domestic league appearances and goals

Morten Bertolt Andersen (born 12 February 1984) is a Danish former professional footballer who played as a midfielder.

Starting his career as a youth prospect of FC Copenhagen, Bertolt played for various national youth teams of Denmark. However, he struggled to establish himself at the club, and had a journeyman career which was hampered by injuries. He retired in 2017, having played for 11 clubs in Denmark and Norway, and with 163 Danish Superliga appearances to his name.

== Career ==
Born in Herlev, Bertolt played as a youth for Avarta, where he started at age 5. He played together with future teammate at FC Copenhagen, Martin Bergvold, and was part of a youth team which won the U13 Danish Championship in 1996 and the U15 championship in 1998. When he was 16 years old, in 2000, he moved to the youth academy of Copenhagen, Kjøbenhavns Boldklub (KB), where he progressed through the youth system.

In 2004, Bertolt was promoted to the Copenhagen first team after signing his first professional contract a few years earlier. Contrary to Bergvold, however, he struggled to establish himself in the starting eleven, and as a result he was sent on loan to Norwegian club HamKam and Danish club Viborg FF, respectively.

On 8 July 2008, Bertolt signed a two-year contract with SønderjyskE. During his two seasons with the club, he made 52 appearances in which he scored two goals. On 6 July 2010, Bertolt moved to newly promoted Superliga club Lyngby, where he signed a one-year contract. He quickly grew out to become a key player for the club, and was even appointed team captain. On 16 June 2011, Bertolt signed a one-year contract extension with Lyngby.

On 25 June 2012, Bertolt returned to Norway to join Tippeligaen club Sandnes Ulf on a two-year contract; a club where fellow Dane Bo Braastrup Andersen already played. He made his debut for the club on 5 August in a 0–1 home loss to Lillestrøm.

In January 2013, Bertolt moved to Danish 1st Division (second-tier) club FC Vestsjælland on a one-and-a-half-year deal. On signing him, head coach Ove Pedersen stated that "Morten Bertolt fully lives up to our demands for reinforcement. He has experience from the Superliga, and he knows what it takes to compete at the highest level. He is serious and he knows his stuff." He made his debut for the club as a starter on 24 March in a 1–0 home win over Brønshøj. Bertolt finished his first six months at the club with 11 appearances.

Bertolt joined Vendsyssel FF in August 2014 on a six-month contract. He left the club as his contract expired in December. He signed with FC Roskilde a few months later, in March 2015, after having impressed on a training camp with the club in Turkey. As part of the Roskilde team, he helped the club avoid relegation from the second tier during the second half of the 2014–15 season.

In August 2015 he returned to FC Vestsjælland, on a five-month contract. After FC Vestsjælland went bankrupt, Bertolt became a free agent, and he then signed with the 1st Division club FC Helsingør on 26 January 2016.

Bertolt announced his retirement from football in July 2017 due to lingering injuries, and instead chose to focus on a career as a mental coach.

== Honours ==
FC Copenhagen

- Danish Superliga (2): 2005–06, 2006–07
