= Álvaro Santos =

Brazilian footballer

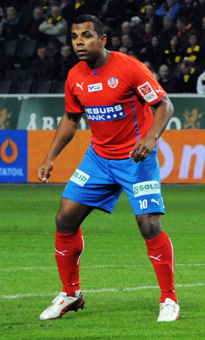
- Santos playing for Helsingborgs IF in 2013

Personal information
- Full name: Álvaro Márcio Santos
- Date of birth: 30 January 1980 (age 46)
- Place of birth: São Paulo, Brazil
- Height: 1.81 m (5 ft 11 in)
- Position: Forward

Team information
- Current team: FC Rosengård (assistant)

Youth career
- América-MG

Senior career*
Years	Team	Apps	(Gls)
1999–2000	América-MG	0	(0)
2000–2003	Helsingborgs IF	64	(35)
2003–2006	Copenhagen	120	(50)
2006–2009	Sochaux	35	(8)
2007–2008	→ Strasbourg (loan)	28	(5)
2009–2011	Örgryte IS	41	(17)
2011	→ GAIS (loan)	16	(6)
2011–2014	Helsingborgs IF	67	(10)
2018	Höganäs BK	11	(2)

Managerial career
- 2018: Helsingborgs IF (U17 manager)
- 2019–2022: Helsingborgs IF (U19 manager)
- 2022–2023: Helsingborgs IF
- 2023: Helsingør (assistant)
- 2023–2024: Helsingør
- 2025: Eskilsminne (U19 manager)
- 2026: Hittarps IK
- * Club domestic league appearances and goals

Álvaro Márcio Santos (Brazilian Portuguese: [ˈawvaɾu ˈsɐ̃tus]; born 30 January 1980) is a Brazilian former professional footballer who played as a forward.

== Career ==
Santos was born in São Paulo and began his career at Brazilian side América Mineiro from Belo Horizonte in 2000.

=== Helsingborgs IF ===
He moved to Swedish club Helsingborgs IF for a three years stint. He made an impact immediately upon his arrival – during his first month in Europe he was instrumental in Helsingborg's elimination of Inter Milan in the 2000–01 UEFA Champions League's third qualification round. Helsingborg qualified for the Champions League group stage, where Alvaro Santos was a key player. Three years later, his goal record in Sweden's top flight Allsvenskan drew the attention of regular Danish champions FC København. During his years with Helsingborg, he became a huge favourite among supporters of the club, and his impact at the club is, regarding the years since the club's top flight comeback in 1993, only rivaled by those of Henrik Larsson's and Roland Nilsson's. Many fans actually rank him higher than Henrik Larsson, and in Helsingborg, Santos is nicknamed "God".

=== Copenhagen ===
His three years in Copenhagen were a success, scoring a total of 50 goals in 120 games for the club. At the end of the 2005–06 season, his last with the Danish champions, he finished second on the top goalscorer list with 15 goals for 33 games. Additionally, his friendly reputation earned him the nickname Verdens Flinkeste Mand (lit. "The World's Nicest Man") by the club's fans.

=== Sochaux ===
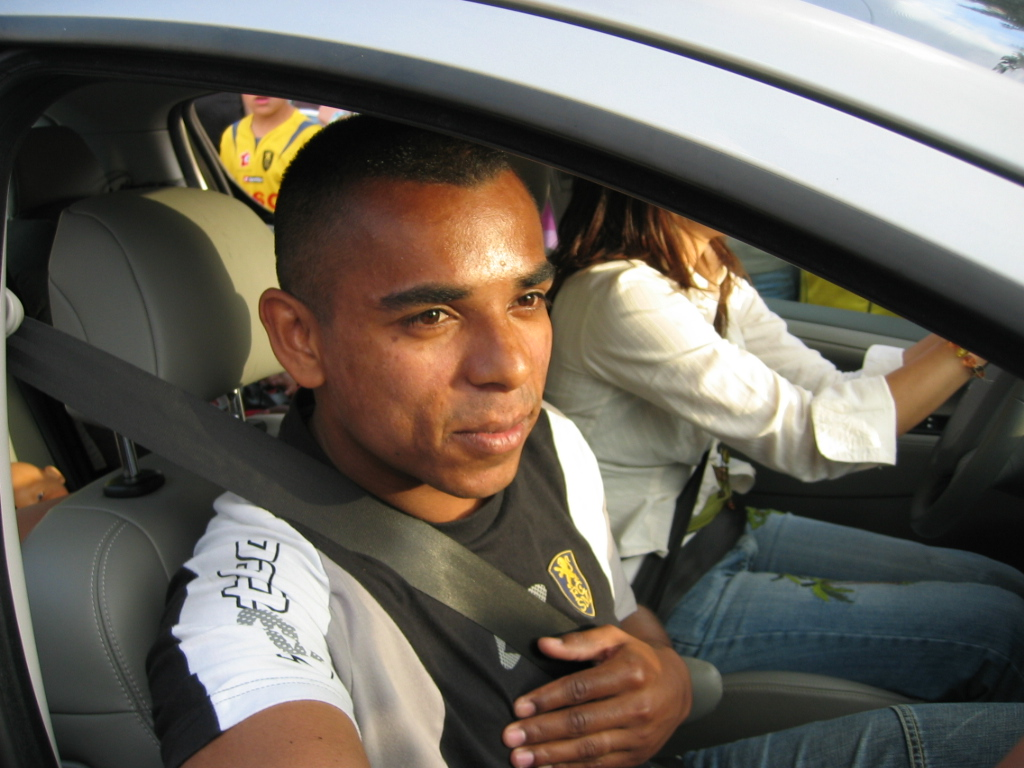
Santos during his time at FC Sochaux in 2007

On 24 July 2006, Santos signed a four-year contract with FC Sochaux to take effect on 1 August. Before his contract officially began, Santos displayed his impact by scoring in a friendly match against Greek side PAOK FC on 30 July. On 2 February 2009, Santos terminated his contract with Sochaux in agreement with the French team.

=== Örgryte ===
On 9 February 2009, it was announced that Santos had signed a three-year contract with the Swedish club Örgryte IS. He played with his former teammate Marcus Allbäck. After the end of the 2010 Allsvenskan season he stated that he did not want to continue with Örgryte I in Superettan. He stated that despite the relegation he felt like he was in good shape and that he wanted to return to playing in Denmark. However, he was instead loaned out to GAIS, another Gothenburg club, and later in 2011 sold to Helsingborgs IF, completing the circle, as he returned to the club where he started his European career.

In 2014, he retired from football and moved back to his native Brazil. As of 2020, Santos manages Helsingborgs IF's U19 team.

== Coaching career ==
In the summer 2017, Santos was hired as assistant coach of Helsingborgs IF's U17 squad. Ahead of the 2018 season, he was named head coach of the team.

In 2019, he took charge of Helsinborg's U19 squad. He left the role on 16 May 2022, as he had been promoted to Helsingborg's first team staff, serving as assistant coach under manager Jörgen Lennartsson. He managed to stay there for just 5 days before Lennartsson was fired. Helsingborg then confirmed that Santos, along with Mattias Lindström, would lead the team temporarily. A few days later, Santos and Lindström were confirmed as the new manager-duo for the club. At the end of 2022, Helsingborg were relegated from the Allsvenskan and the new 2023 season started with three consecutive defeats, so the club decided to let Santos and the rest of the staff go on May 17, 2023.

On 30 June 2023, Santos returned to Denmark, as he was hired assistant coach of FC Helsingør, under manager Daniel Pedersen. On 23 October 2023, Santos was named new manager of FC Helsingør. Two wins in 32 games. These were the sad statistics for FC Helsingør, who finished in last place in the Danish 1st Division, which is why the club confirmed on June 1, 2024 that they had fired Santos as head coach.

In November 2024, ahead of th 2025 season, it was confirmed, that Santos had been appointed manager of Eskilsminne IF. In December 2025, ahead of the 2026 season, he was appointed manager of Hittarps IK. But just two weeks into 2026, Santos accepted a new job offer from FC Rosengård, where he was appointed assistant coach to William Bergendahl. The appointment came through FC Rosengård’s close cooperation with F.C. Copenhagen, a connection through which Santos, who has ties to Copenhagen, was brought into the club.

== Honours ==
Helsingborgs IF

- Allsvenskan: 2011
- Svenska Cupen: 2011
- Svenska Supercupen: 2011

FC Copenhagen

- Royal League: 2004–05, 2005–06
- Danish Superliga: 2003–04, 2005–06
- Danish Cup: 2003–04
- Danish Super Cup: 2004

Sochaux

- Coupe de France: 2006–07
