= Fredrik Berglund =

Swedish footballer (born 1979)

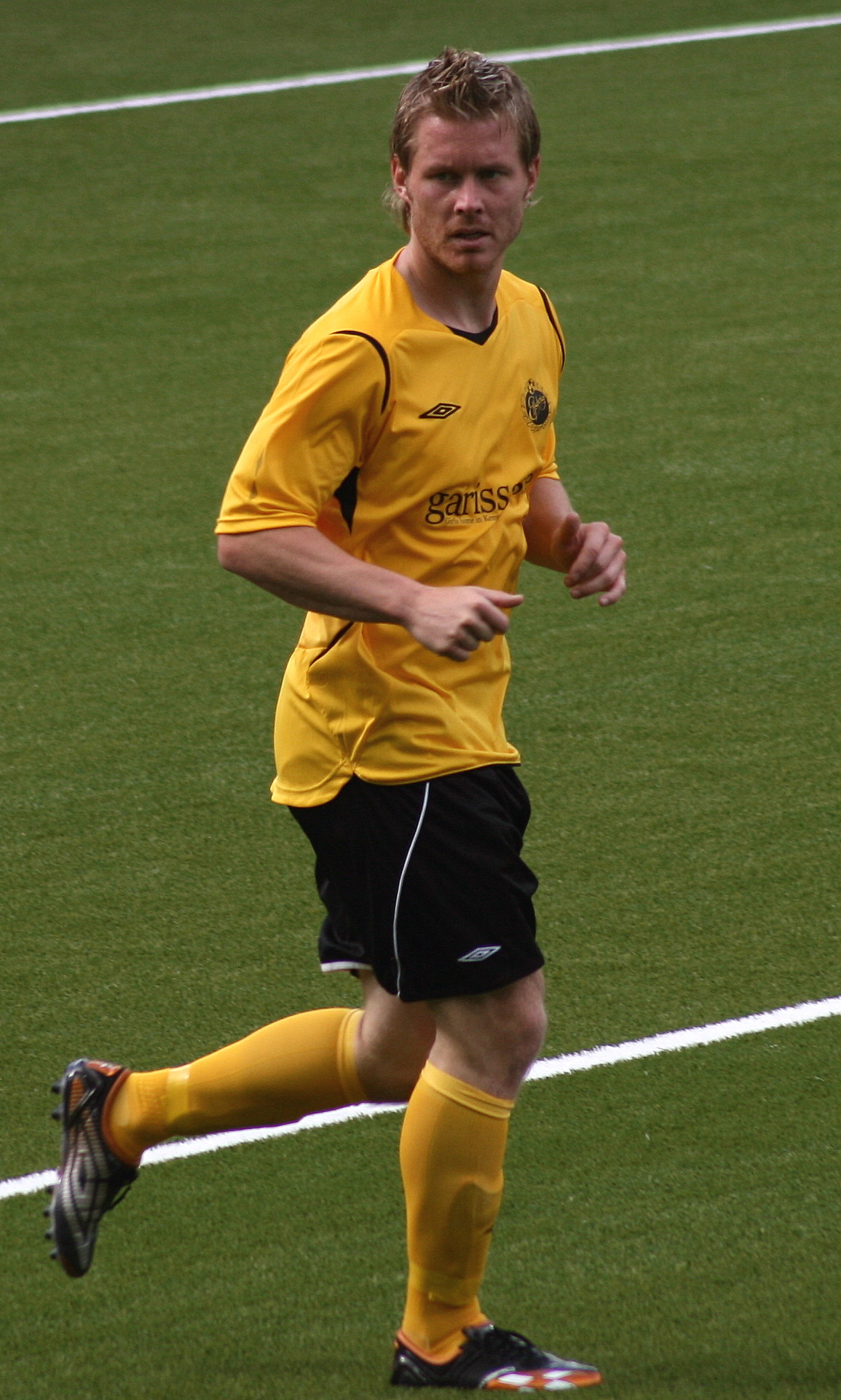
- Berglund with IF Elfsborg in 2008

Personal information
- Full name: Jan Fredrik Berglund
- Date of birth: 21 March 1979 (age 47)
- Place of birth: Borås, Sweden
- Height: 1.80 m (5 ft 11 in)
- Positions: Winger; centre forward

Youth career
- 1986–1992: Byttorps IF
- 1993–1995: IF Elfsborg

Senior career*
Years	Team	Apps	(Gls)
1995–2001	IF Elfsborg	118	(40)
2001–2004	Roda JC	42	(5)
2003	→ IF Elfsborg (loan)	15	(4)
2004–2006	Esbjerg fB	99	(57)
2006–2007	F.C. Copenhagen	29	(7)
2007–2010	IF Elfsborg	35	(11)
2009	→ Stabæk (loan)	26	(6)
Total		364	(130)

International career
1994–1995	Sweden U17	26	(8)
1996–1997	Sweden U19	13	(6)
1998–2001	Sweden U21	27	(6)
2001–2006	Sweden	12	(2)
- * Club domestic league appearances and goals

Jan Fredrik Berglund (born 21 March 1979) is a Swedish former professional footballer who played as a forward. He started off his career with IF Elfsborg in 1995 and became the Allsvenskan top scorer during the 2000 season. He then went on to represent Roda JC, Esbjerg fB, FC Copenhagen, and Stabæk before retiring at IF Elfsborg in early 2011. A full international between 2001 and 2006, he won 12 caps and scored two goals for the Sweden national team.

== Club career ==
=== Early years ===
Berglund started his professional career with IF Elfsborg and was a key player together with Anders Svensson and Tobias Linderoth, the three of them were nicknamed "The Headband Gang". In the 2000 season he was top goalscorer of the Allsvenskan and he attracted interest from foreign based clubs and eventually signed for Dutch side Roda JC in a €750.000 deal.

=== Roda JC ===
Berglund had a hard time in the Netherlands and after a year and a half, he was sent on loan back to Sweden and IF Elfsborg. He returned to the Netherlands for the remaining of the 2003–04 season and played a few games.

=== Denmark ===
In the spring of 2004 Berglund moved to Danish Superliga side Esbjerg fB who paid a record transfer fee of €150,000 for him. He made his debut for Esbjerg on 14 March 2004 in a game against Brøndby IF away scoring two goals and making three assists in a 6–1 win.

Berglund played two and a half years in Esbjerg before he was transferred to Danish champions F.C. Copenhagen in the summer of 2006. He played only one season with the club, playing 52 games (Danish Superliga, Danish Cup, Royal League and UEFA Champions League) and scoring 18 goals. He once again played alongside former teammate Tobias Linderoth.

On 26 November 2006, he beat Erik Bo Andersen's record of quickest person to score 50 goals in the Danish Superliga. Andersen had used 97 matches to score the 50 goals, but Berglund could, with a goal against Randers FC, score his goal no. 50 after 93 matches.

=== Return to Elfsborg ===
In the spring of 2007, F.C. Copenhagen brought in Brazilian striker Ailton Almeida whose arrival pushed Berglund out of the starting line-up and when the club in the summer of 2007 also signed the Danish international forward Morten Nordstrand, Berglund was suddenly fourth or fifth choice for one of the two slots in the F.C. Copenhagen attack. A few days after Nordstrand's arrival, Berglund moved back to Sweden and signed once again with IF Elfsborg. The transfer fee was reported to be 4.9 million DKK, €750,000.

Berglund played his first game for Elfsborg 12 July 2007 when he came on as a substitute in a 2–0 victory at home against AIK.

==== Loan to Stabæk ====
On 31 March, ten minutes before midnight and the end of the Norwegian transfer window, 2008 champions Stabæk announced that they had signed Fredrik on a season-long loan deal.

=== Retirement ===
On 10 January 2011, Berglund officially announced his retirement from football as a player. After being sidelined a long time with constant injuries, Berglund felt he no longer had the motivation to continue playing.

== International career ==
Berglund was capped 12 times for the Sweden national team and scored two goals. He got his debut and scored his first international goal with the national side on 10 February 2001 against Thailand in the 2001 King's Cup. He won his 12th and ultimately final international cap for Sweden on 15 November 2006 in a friendly game against the Ivory Coast.

== Career statistics ==
=== International ===
Appearances and goals by national team and year
National team	Year	Apps	Goals
Sweden	2001	3	1
Sweden	2002	0	0
Sweden	2003	0	0
Sweden	2004	1	1
Sweden	2005	4	0
Sweden	2006	4	0
Total		12	2

Scores and results list Sweden's goal tally first, score column indicates score after each Berglund goal.

List of international goals scored by Fredrik Berglund
No.	Date	Venue	Opponent	Score	Result	Competition	Ref.
1	10 February 2001	National Stadium, Bangkok, Thailand	Thailand	3–1	4–1	2001 King's Cup	
2	17 October 2004	Easter Road Stadium, Edinburgh, Scotland	Scotland	4–0	4–1	Friendly	

== Honours ==
IF Elfsborg

- Svenska Cupen: 2000–01

Copenhagen

- Danish Superliga: 2006–07

Individual

- Allsvenskan top scorer: 2000
