= Danish Super Cup =

Defunct annual match in Danish football

The Danish Super Cup was played for by the Danish League champions and the Danish Cup Winners.

== Winners ==
Year	Winners	Score	Runners-up	Venue
1994	Brøndby IF (1993–94 Danish Cup Winners)	4–0	Silkeborg IF (1993–94 Danish Superliga Winners)	Brøndby Stadium
1995	F.C. Copenhagen (1994–95 Danish Cup Winners)	2–1	Aalborg BK (1994–95 Danish Superliga Winners)	Brøndby Stadium
1996	Brøndby IF (1995–96 Danish Superliga Winners)	4–0	AGF (1995–96 Danish Cup Winners)	Brøndby Stadium
1997	Brøndby IF (1996–97 Danish Superliga Winners)	2–0	F.C. Copenhagen (1996–97 Danish Cup Winners)	Brøndby Stadium
1998	Not played			
1999	AB (1998–99 Danish Cup Winners)	2–2 (Note: AB won on penalty shoot-out)	Aalborg BK (1998–99 Danish Superliga Winners)	Aalborg Stadium
2000	Viborg FF (1999–2000 Danish Cup Winners)	1–1 (Note: Viborg won on penalty shoot-out)	Herfølge BK (1999–2000 Danish Superliga Winners)	Herfølge Stadium
2001	F.C. Copenhagen (2000–01 Danish Superliga Winners)	2–0	Silkeborg IF (2000–01 Danish Cup Winners)	Parken Stadium
2002	Brøndby IF (2001–02 Danish Superliga Winners)	1–0	Odense BK (2001–02 Danish Cup Winners)	Brøndby Stadium
2003	Not played due to scheduling conflicts.			
2004	F.C. Copenhagen (2003–04 Danish Superliga & Danish Cup Winners)	2–1	Aalborg BK (2003–04 Danish Cup Runners-up)	Parken Stadium

== Titles by club ==
Club	Winners	Runners-up	Years won	Years runner-up
Brøndby IF	4	–	1994, 1996, 1997, 2002	–
F.C. Copenhagen	3	1	1995, 2001, 2004	1997
AB	1	–	1999	–
Viborg FF	1	–	2000	–
Aalborg BK	–	3	–	1995, 1999, 2004
Silkeborg IF	–	2	–	1994, 2001
AGF	–	1	–	1996
Herfølge BK	–	1	–	2000
Odense BK	–	1	–	2002
