= 2003–04 Danish Superliga =

14th season of Danish Superliga

SAS Ligaen
- Season: 2003-04
- Champions: F.C. Copenhagen
- Relegated: BK Frem; AB Copenhagen

The 2003–04 Danish Superliga season was the 14th season of the Danish Superliga league championship, governed by the Danish Football Association. It took place from the first match on July 26, 2003 to the final match on May 29, 2004.

The Danish champions qualified for UEFA Champions League 2004-05 qualification and the Royal League 2004-05. The runners-up qualified for UEFA Cup 2004-05 qualification and Royal League, while the 3rd and 4th placed teams qualified for UEFA Intertoto Cup 2004 and Royal League. The 11th and 12th placed teams were relegated to the 1st Division. The 1st Division champions and runners-up were promoted to the Superliga.

== Table ==
Pos	Team	Pld	W	D	L	GF	GA	GD	Pts	Qualification or relegation
1	FC København (C)	33	20	8	5	56	27	+29	68	Qualification to Champions League second qualifying round and Royal League
2	Brøndby IF	33	20	7	6	55	29	+26	67	Qualification to UEFA Cup second qualifying round and Royal League
3	Esbjerg fB	33	18	8	7	71	44	+27	62	Qualification to Intertoto Cup second round and Royal League
4	Odense BK	33	16	9	8	66	46	+20	57	Qualification to Intertoto Cup second round and Royal League
5	Aalborg BK	33	16	9	8	55	41	+14	57	Qualification to UEFA Cup second qualifying round (Note: Aalborg BK qualified for UEFA Cup second qualifying round as the runner-up of 2003–04 Danish Cup.)
6	FC Midtjylland	33	14	6	13	65	51	+14	48	
7	Viborg FF	33	11	9	13	47	44	+3	42	
8	Aarhus GF	33	11	3	19	45	67	−22	36	
9	FC Nordsjælland	33	7	11	15	35	59	−24	32	
10	Herfølge BK	33	8	7	18	34	57	−23	31	
11	BK Frem (R)	33	8	3	22	40	65	−25	27	Relegation to Danish 1st Division
12	AB Copenhagen (Note: AB Copenhagen lost 9 points, by use of Ali Akida with fake passport.) (R)	33	8	2	23	31	70	−39	17	Relegation to Danish 1st Division

Rules for classification: 1) points; 2) goal difference; 3) number of goals scored.
(C) Champions; (R) Relegated

== Results ==
Home \ Away	AB	AGF	BKF	BIF	EFB	FCK	FCM	FCN	HBK	OB	VFF	AAB	AB	AGF	BKF	BIF	EFB	FCK	FCM	FCN	HBK	OB	VFF	AAB
AB		3–1	1–0	0–3	2–4	0–1	3–3	2–1	1–2	0–3	1–4	0–2				0–1	2–5	0–2					0–3	0–3
AGF	2–0		1–0	1–2	4–1	0–2	5–3	2–2	2–1	0–5	0–2	0–1	3–1						2–1	1–2	1–3	1–0		
BK Frem	1–2	1–4		0–2	0–4	1–2	2–1	5–1	1–0	1–3	2–3	0–1	1–2	1–2		1–3					3–2		3–1	
Brøndby IF	2–1	2–0	3–1		3–0	0–1	1–3	2–1	2–0	1–1	1–0	1–1		2–0			1–6	2–2	2–1		3–0			4–0
Esbjerg fB	3–1	2–0	2–0	0–0		1–1	2–0	4–0	2–0	3–3	2–0	3–2		3–3	6–3			0–2	2–0		2–0			4–2
FC Copenhagen	3–1	4–0	2–0	1–0	0–1		0–1	2–1	0–0	2–4	0–1	1–1		1–1	3–2				2–1	2–0	1–1	2–2		
FC Midtjylland	3–0	5–2	4–1	0–2	2–1	2–1		1–1	0–2	2–1	1–1	2–3	6–0		3–3					3–0		3–1	0–0	
FC Nordsjælland	1–1	1–3	1–3	0–1	1–1	2–4	1–7		1–1	2–0	2–1	0–0	1–0		2–1	0–0	2–0					3–0	0–4	
Herfølge BK	0–2	1–0	0–1	1–3	3–1	0–1	0–1	2–1		2–2	2–1	3–3	0–1						1–4	1–1		2–2	0–1	
Odense BK	2–1	4–2	2–0	0–1	2–0	0–4	4–0	1–1	4–0		4–2	0–0	1–0		2–1	1–0	2–2						4–2	3–1
Viborg FF	0–2	1–0	0–0	2–2	1–1	2–2	1–1	0–0	2–0	2–2		2–3		4–0		3–2	1–2	0–2						0–1
AaB	3–1	2–1	0–1	1–1	1–1	0–2	1–0	1–0	0–2	3–1	2–0			4–1	0–0			0–1	3–1	3–3	7–2			

Source: Danskfodbold.com

== Top goal scorers ==
Rank	Player	Club	Goals
1	(Denmark) Steffen Højer	OB	19
1	(Egypt) Mohamed Zidan	FC Midtjylland	19
1	(Denmark) Tommy Bechmann	Esbjerg fB	19
1	(Zambia) Mwape Miti	OB	19
5	(Denmark) Christian Lundberg	AaB	16
5	(Denmark) Frank Kristensen	FC Midtjylland	16
7	(Brazil) Álvaro Santos	FC København	13
7	(Denmark) Klaus Kærgård	Viborg FF	13
9	(Denmark) David Nielsen	Aalborg BK	11
9	(Denmark) Søren Larsen	BK Frem	11
9	(Denmark) Thomas Kahlenberg	Brøndby IF	11
9	(Denmark) Søren Frederiksen	Viborg FF	11

== Attendances ==
No.	Club	Average	Highest
1	FC København	20,449	41,005
2	Brøndby IF	17,525	28,946
3	AGF	10,547	17,071
4	OB	8,977	14,412
5	AaB	7,639	10,503
6	Esbjerg fB	6,734	13,713
7	FC Midtjylland	5,624	11,685
8	Viborg FF	4,512	7,873
9	BK Frem	4,282	10,200
10	FC Nordsjælland	2,967	9,920
11	AB	2,885	10,039
12	Herfølge BK	2,330	5,518

== See also ==
- 2003-04 in Danish football
