= 2003–04 Danish Cup =

50th Danish Cup football tournament

DBU Pokalen (The DBU Cup)
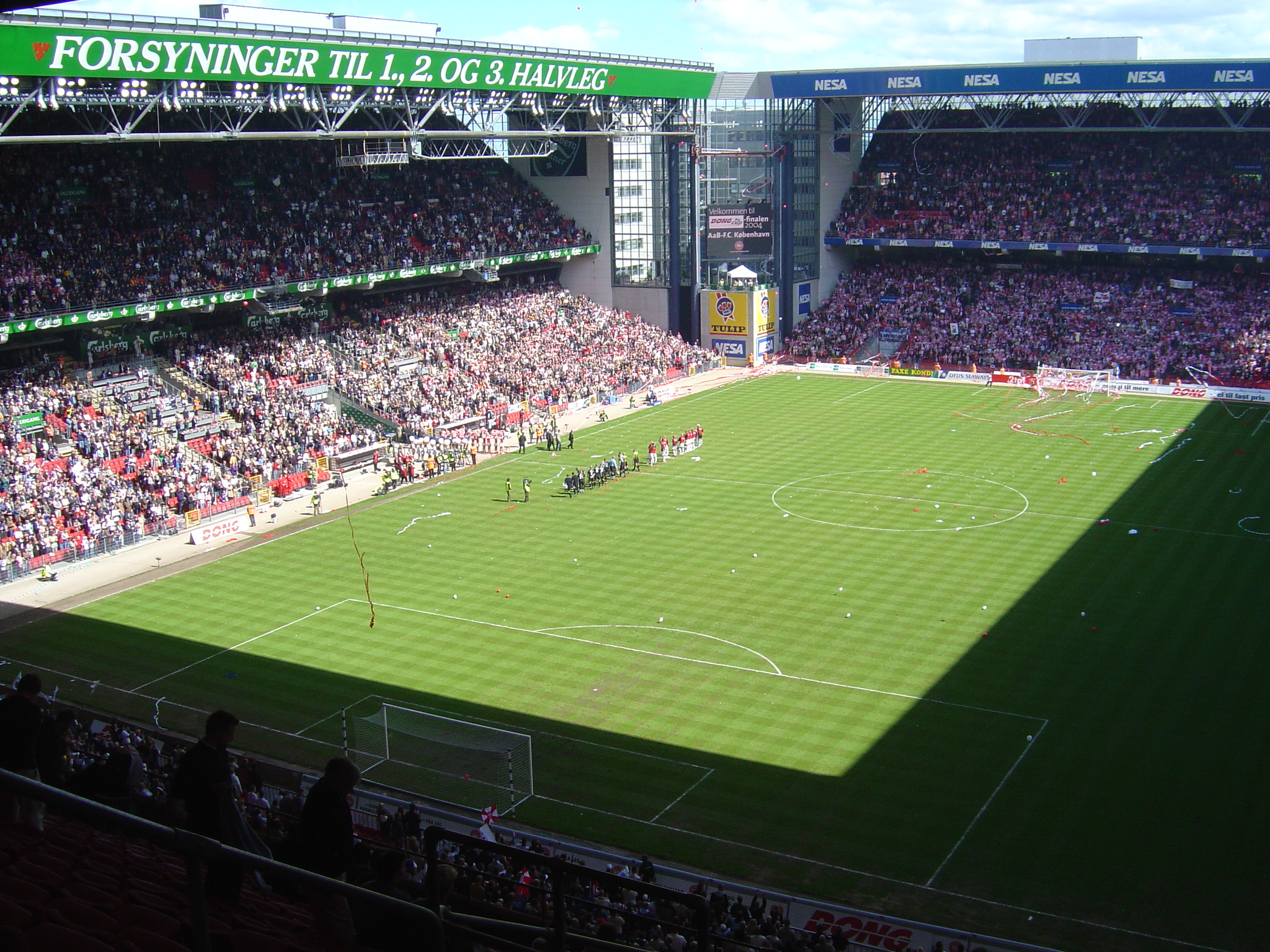
- The 2003/04 season finale between F.C. Copenhagen and AaB in Parken Stadium.

Tournament details
- Country: Denmark

Final positions
- Champions: F.C. Copenhagen
- Runners-up: Aalborg BK

The 2003–04 Danish Cup was the 50th season of the Danish Cup. The final was played on 20 May 2004.

FC København ended as cup winner, but as they also won the Danish Superliga, the UEFA Cup-spot went to the cup runner-up Aalborg BK.

== First round ==
In first round competed 48 teams from the "series" (2002 Denmark Series and lower) and 16 teams from 2002–03 Danish 2nd Divisions.

Team 1	Score	Team 2
Kolding KFUM	1–3	Varde IF
Østre BK	1–3	Korup IF
Virum/Sorgenfri BK	1–5	Nykøbing FA
Borbjerg GU	0–5	Nørresundby BK
Hornbæk IF	1–1 (a.e.t.) (5–4 p)	Vildbjerg SF
Ringkøbing IF	0–3	FC Nordjylland
Braband IF	0–2	Skive IK
Koldby-Hørdum IF	0–3	Holstebro BK
IF Kvik	1–1 (a.e.t.) (3–0 p)	Lindholm IF
Hobro IK	3–1	Hjørring IF
Brønderslev IF	0–2	Jetsmark IF
Odder IGF	2–1	Næsby BK
Tåsinge fB	1–3	Hviding IF
Allesø GF	3–4	Svendborg fB
Marstal IF	2–6	Fjordager IF
BK Marienlyst	2–7	Dalum IF
Stensballe IF	4–2	IF AIA-Tranbjerg
Sædding/Guldager IF	1–2	Kolding FC
FC Bornholm	3–1	Lyngby BK
Taastrup FC	0–1	Fremad Amager
Amager FF	2–1	B 1908
Rosenhøj BK	1–1 (a.e.t.) (3–4 p)	Frederiksberg BK
FC Lejre/Ogsted	4–0	BK Frem Sakskøbing
Kalundborg GB	1–4	Glostrup FK
Toreby-Grænge BK	0–13	Holbæk B&I
KFUM Roskilde	6–3	Listrup UIF
Ørslev G&IF	1–2	IF Skjold Birkerød
Helsingør IF	1–0	Albertslund IF
BK Rødovre	2–1	Roskilde BK
Valby BK	1–6	Slagelse B&I
Østerbro IF	1–0	Næstved BK
BK Viktoria	2–8	Greve IF

== Second round ==
In second round competed 32 winning teams from 1st round and 8 teams from 2002–03 Danish 1st Division (no. 9 to 16).

Team 1	Score	Team 2
Skive IK	3–1	Kolding FC
B 1909	2–4 (a.e.t.)	Holstebro BK
Dalum IF	0–3	FC Aarhus
Vildbjerg SF	0–4	Nørresundby BK
Varde IF	8–0	Korup IF
Odder IGF	4–1	Fjordager IF
Stensballe IF	0–5	Jetsmark IF
IF Kvik	1–3	FC Nordjylland
Hviding IF	1–14	AC Horsens
Hobro IK	2–2 (a.e.t.) (3–5 p)	Svendborg fB
BK Rødovre	1–2	Hvidovre IF
Amager FF	1–8	Nykøbing FA
KFUM Roskilde	5–3	Fremad Amager
Hellerup IK	2–0	Slagelse B&I
Greve IF	2–0	Brønshøj BK
FC Lejre/Ogsted	0–2	IF Skjold Birkerød
Frederiksberg BK	0–1	Holbæk B&I
FC Bornholm	0–1	B.93
Østerbro IF	1–3	B 1913
Helsingør IF	1–0	Glostrup FK

== Third round ==
In third round competed 20 winning teams from 2nd round, 6 teams from 2002–03 Danish 1st Division (no. 3 to 8) and 2 teams from 2002–03 Danish Superliga (no. 11 and 12).

Team 1	Score	Team 2
Randers FC	5–1	FC Aarhus
Skive IK	3–2 (a.e.t.)	HFK Sønderjylland
Vejle BK	2–4	Silkeborg IF
Odder IGF	0–6	AC Horsens
Nørresundby BK	1–2	FC Nordjylland
Holstebro BK	4–4 (a.e.t.) (4–3 p)	FC Fredericia
Varde IF	0–1	Jetsmark IF
Holbæk B&I	2–4	Ølstykke FC
Greve IF	0–5	Køge BK
IF Skjold Birkerød	1–3	B 1913
Hellerup IK	1–4	B.93
Hvidovre IF	1–2	Nykøbing Falster Alliancen
KFUM Roskilde	0–1	Helsingør IF
Svendborg fB	1–4 (a.e.t.)	BK Skjold

== Fourth round ==
In fourth round competed 14 winning teams from 3rd round, 2 teams from 2002–03 Danish 1st Division (no. 1 and 2) and 4 teams from 2002–03 Danish Superliga (no. 7 to 10).

Team 1	Score	Team 2
Viborg FF	1–0	Aarhus GF
Silkeborg IF	4–2	Herfølge BK
Nykøbing FA	4–0	FC Nordjylland
Skive IK	3–2	Holstebro BK
Helsingør IF	2–0	Jetsmark IF
BK Skjold	1–2	AC Horsens
Køge BK	1–1 (a.e.t.) (3–4 p)	AB
Randers FC	3–4	Ølstykke FC
B 1913	0–1	B.93
FC Midtjylland	0–1	BK Frem

== Fifth round ==
In fifth round competed 10 winning teams from 4th round and 6 teams from 2002–03 Danish Superliga (no. 1 to 6).

Team 1	Score	Team 2
AB	0–1	Viborg FF
Ølstykke FC	4–5	Odense BK
Helsingør IF	1–3	Skive IK
FC Nordsjælland	2–4	F.C. Copenhagen
Esbjerg fB	1–2	AaB
B.93	1–3 (a.e.t.)	AC Horsens
BK Frem	0–2	Brøndby IF
Silkeborg IF	1–2	Nykøbing FA

== Quarter-finals ==
Team 1	Score	Team 2
AaB	2–0	Viborg FF
AC Horsens	1–2	Odense BK
Skive IK	0–2	F.C. Copenhagen
Nykøbing FA	0–2	Brøndby IF

== Semi-finals ==
The semi finals are played on home and away basis.

Team 1	Agg.	Team 2	1st leg	2nd leg
F.C. Copenhagen	7–3	Odense BK	3–1	4–2
Brøndby IF	1–2	AaB	0–0	1–2

== Final ==
20 May 2004
15:00 CEST

AaB	0–1	F.C. Copenhagen
		Bisgaard 28'

Parken Stadium, Copenhagen
Attendance: 38,095
Referee: Michael Svendsen

== See also ==
- Football in Denmark
- 2003–04 Danish Superliga
- 2003–04 Danish 1st Division
