= Royal League =

- Founded: 2004
- Abolished: 2007
- Region: Scandinavia
- Teams: 12
- Last champions: Brøndby IF
- Most championships: F.C. Copenhagen (2 titles)

The Royal League was an annual Scandinavian football tournament held three times in the 2000s between teams from the three Scandinavian monarchies (Denmark, Sweden, and Norway), starting after the end of the regular domestic seasons of Norway and Sweden. Denmark, however, was mid-season when the tournament started. The four best-placed teams in the football leagues of Denmark, Norway and Sweden participated in the tournament.

The 2007–08 edition was cancelled due to financial reasons.

== History ==
The concept of an club football winter tournament was first reported in Swedish newspapers Dagens Nyheter and Expressen in October 2003. The concept was launched in April the following year through press conferences in the three Scandinavian capitals Copenhagen, Oslo, and Stockholm.

For the 2004–05 Royal League tournament, the twelve participating teams were initially placed into three groups. The two best-placed teams from each country were placed in the same group, while the two other teams were placed in the other groups. In each group, each team played against the other three teams, once at home and once away. The two best-placed teams from each group would be randomly placed into two new groups. The three teams of each new group also played each other across two legs. The 2005 Royal League Final was contested on 26 May 2005, by Swedish team IFK Gothenburg and FC Copenhagen from Denmark. FC Copenhagen won the inaugural title following a penalty shootout.

In the second iteration of the tournament, the twelve participating teams were divided into three preliminary groups. The two best-placed teams of each group, and the two best third-placed teams went on to play in the quarterfinals. The rest of the tournament was played in a knockout-system. The quarter-finals and semi-finals were played both at home and away, while there was only a single final game to decide the winner. The 2006 Royal League Final was contested on 6 April 2006, by FC Copenhagen of Denmark, and Lillestrøm of Norway. FC Copenhagen won their second title when Razak Pimpong scored in the final few minutes to win 1–0.

For the 2006–07 Royal League tournament, the structure of initial group stage and subsequent knockout-stage was kept. As opposed to the previous edition of the tournament, the knock-out stages were played as single games, with the team having the best group stage record earning home-field advantage. The 2007 Royal League Final was contested on 15 March 2007, by the Danish team Brøndby IF and FC Copenhagen. Brøndby won 1–0, on a penalty kick converted by Martin Ericsson.

The league received quite a lot of criticism during its existence. Teams rarely played with their best players, leading to a lack of interest. Increasing the prize money and/or direct qualification into the UEFA Champions League have been suggested as ways to improve interest.

The 2007–08 edition was cancelled due to financial reasons, but the board initially planned to resurrect the tournament for the 2008–09 season. On 11 October 2008, it was announced that the 2008–09 season would not be held as the TV rights for the tournament were not sold.

There were plans for a tournament in 2010 under the new name Royal Cup.

== Finals ==
List of Royal League finals
Season	Winners	Nation	Score	Runners-up	Nation	Venue	Att.	Date
2004–05	Copenhagen	Denmark	1–1, (11–10 pen)	Göteborg	Sweden	Ullevi, Gothenburg	10,216	26 May 2005
2005–06	Copenhagen	Denmark	1–0	Lillestrøm	Norway	Parken, Copenhagen	13,617	6 April 2006
2006–07	Brøndby	Denmark	1–0	Copenhagen	Denmark	Brøndby Stadion, Brøndby	17,914	15 March 2007

== All-time table by country ==
Country	Titles	Runners-up
Denmark	3	1
Norway	0	1
Sweden	0	1

== See also ==
- Allsvenskan
- Danish Superliga
- Eliteserien
- Nordic Football Championship
- Baltic League
- Nordic Cup
