= 2014–15 Evian Thonon Gaillard FC season =

Evian
2014–15 season
- Chairman: Patrick Trotignon
- Manager: Pascal Dupraz
- Stadium: Parc des Sports
- Ligue 1: 18th (Relegated)
- Coupe de France: Round of 32 vs. Monaco
- Coupe de la Ligue: Round of 32 vs. Lorient
- Top goalscorer: League: Daniel Wass (8); All: Daniel Wass (10)
- Highest home attendance: 14,600 vs Paris Saint-Germain (22 August 2014)
- Lowest home attendance: 4,526 vs Lorient (28 October 2014)
- Average home league attendance: 10,514
Home colours	Away colours	Third colours

The 2014–15 Evian Thonon Gaillard F.C. season is the 12th professional season of the club since its creation in 2003. After 4 seasons in Ligue 1 Evian finished in 18th and were relegated from the league for the first time in their history.

== Players ==
=== First team squad ===
French teams are limited to four players without EU citizenship. Hence, the squad list includes only the principal nationality of each player; several non-European players on the squad have dual citizenship with an EU country. Also, players from the ACP countries—countries in Africa, the Caribbean, and the Pacific that are signatories to the Cotonou Agreement—are not counted against non-EU quotas due to the Kolpak ruling.

Note: Flags indicate national team as defined under FIFA eligibility rules; some limited exceptions apply. Players may hold more than one non-FIFA nationality.

No.	Pos.	Nation	Player
1	GK	FRA	Johann Durand
2	DF	COM	Kassim Abdallah
5	MF	SRB	Miloš Ninković
6	MF	BFA	Djakaridja Koné
7	MF	FRA	Adrien Thomasson
8	MF	CRC	Yeltsin Tejeda
9	FW	ARG	Nicolás Blandi (on loan from San Lorenzo)
10	FW	FRA	Mathieu Duhamel (on loan from Caen)
11	MF	TUN	Fabien Camus (on loan from Racing Genk)
12	FW	CRC	David Ramírez (on loan from Deportivo Saprissa)
13	DF	CMR	Dany Nounkeu (on loan from Galatasaray)
14	MF	FRA	Cédric Barbosa
15	MF	FRA	Gilles Sunu
17	DF	FRA	Aldo Angoula

No.	Pos.	Nation	Player
18	DF	DEN	Daniel Wass
19	DF	FRA	Youssouf Sabaly (on loan from Paris Saint-Germain)
20	FW	SEN	Modou Sougou (on loan from Marseille)
21	DF	COD	Cédric Mongongu
22	DF	FRA	Cédric Cambon
23	FW	DEN	Nicki Bille Nielsen
24	MF	FRA	Olivier Sorlin (captain)
25	DF	GHA	Jonathan Mensah
26	DF	DEN	Jesper Juelsgård
27	FW	FRA	Clarck N'Sikulu
28	FW	FRA	Nadjib Baouia
29	FW	FRA	Zakariya Abarouai
30	GK	DEN	Jesper Hansen
40	GK	FRA	Benjamin Leroy

==== Out on loan ====
Note: Flags indicate national team as defined under FIFA eligibility rules; some limited exceptions apply. Players may hold more than one non-FIFA nationality.

No.	Pos.	Nation	Player
--	MF	ROU	Dan Nistor (at Pandurii Târgu Jiu)
--	MF	FRA	Nicolas Benezet (at Caen)

No.	Pos.	Nation	Player
--	FW	BEL	Gianni Bruno (at Lorient)

=== Ligue 1 ===
==== League table ====
Pos	Team	Pld	W	D	L	GF	GA	GD	Pts	Qualification or relegation
16	Lorient	38	12	7	19	44	50	−6	43	
17	Toulouse	38	12	6	20	43	64	−21	42	
18	Evian (R)	38	11	4	23	41	62	−21	37	Relegation to Ligue 2
19	Metz (R)	38	7	9	22	31	61	−30	30	Relegation to Ligue 2
20	Lens (Note: It was announced on 29 January 2015 that Lens' promotion from Ligue 2 at the end of the 2013–14 season has been ruled invalid, and will thus be automatically relegated to Ligue 2 for the 2015–16 season, regardless of where the team place this season. It has been confirmed by the French Football Federation that the decision of the Administrative Court of Besançon will be appealed.) (D, R)	38	7	8	23	32	61	−29	29	Relegation to Ligue 2

Source: Ligue 1
Rules for classification: 1) points; 2) goal difference; 3) number of goals scored
(D) Disqualified; (R) Relegated

==== Results summary ====
Overall								Home						Away					
Pld	W	D	L	GF	GA	GD	Pts	W	D	L	GF	GA	GD	W	D	L	GF	GA	GD
38	11	4	23	41	62	−21	37	7	2	10	20	25	−5	4	2	13	21	37	−16

Last updated: 15 June 2015.
Source: Competitive matches

==== Results by round ====
Round	1	2	3	4	5	6	7	8	9	10	11	12	13	14	15	16	17	18	19	20	21	22	23	24	25	26	27	28	29	30	31	32	33	34	35	36	37	38
Ground	H	A	H	A	H	A	H	A	H	A	H	A	H	A	H	A	H	A	A	H	A	H	A	H	A	H	A	H	A	H	A	H	A	H	A	H	H	A
Result	L	L	D	L	L	L	W	W	W	L	L	L	W	L	W	W	L	L	L	D	L	W	L	L	W	W	W	L	L	W	D	L	D	L	L	L	L	L
Position	20	20	20	20	20	20	20	18	15	17	19	20	16	18	16	14	15	17	18	18	18	16	18	18	18	16	16	16	17	16	15	15	17	18	18	18	18	18

Source: Ligue1
A = Away; H = Home; W = Win; D = Draw; L = Loss
Notes:
- Match 14 versus Lille was postponed until 7 January 2015 and therefore should appear between matches 19 & 20.
- Match 26 versus Lorient was postponed until 4 March and should appear between matches 27 & 28.

==== Matches ====
Win Draw Loss

9 August 2014 1	Evian	0–3	Caen	Annecy
21:00 CEST (UTC+02:00)	Juelsgård (yellow card) 47'	Report	Kanté 12'; Duhamel 32', 37'; Imorou (yellow card) 90'	Stadium: Parc des Sports; Attendance: 9,915; Referee: Saïd Ennjimi

16 August 2014 2	Rennes	6–2	Evian	Rennes
20:00 CEST (UTC+02:00)	Toivonen 6', 57'; Mexer 39', 43'; Ntep 76', 87'	Report	Sorlin (yellow card) 23'; Wass 35', 83'	Stadium: Roazhon Park; Attendance: 17,591; Referee: Olivier Thual

22 August 2014 3	Evian	0–0	Paris Saint-Germain	Annecy
20:30 CEST (UTC+02:00)	Mensah (yellow card) 15'; Sabaly (yellow card) 21'; Sorlin (yellow card) 66'	Report	Cabaye (yellow card) 17' (yellow-red card) 63'; Verratti (yellow card) 78'	Stadium: Parc des Sports; Attendance: 14,600; Referee: Benoît Bastien

30 August 2013 4	Toulouse	1–0	Evian	Toulouse
20:00 CEST (UTC+02:00)	Grigore (yellow card) 45'; Regattin 78'	Report	Angoula (yellow card) 17' (yellow-red card) 83'; Bille Nielsen (yellow card) 35'	Stadium: Stadium Municipal; Attendance: 10,206; Referee: Benoît Millot

14 September 2014 5	Evian	1–3	Marseille	Annecy
21:00 CEST (UTC+02:00)	Mensah (yellow card) 23'; N'Sikulu 90+1'	Report	Gignac 1'; Mensah 44' (o.g.); Thauvin 63'	Stadium: Parc des Sports; Attendance: 12,967; Referee: Amaury Delerue

19 September 2014 6	Bordeaux	2–1	Evian	Bordeaux
20:30 CEST (UTC+02:00)	Rolán 19'; Khazri 56'	Report	Camus (yellow card) 29'; Tejeda (yellow card) 45+1', (goal) 86'	Stadium: Stade Chaban-Delmas; Attendance: 15,103; Referee: Bartolomeu Varela

24 September 2014 7	Evian	2–1	Lens	Annecy
19:00 CEST (UTC+02:00)	Wass 10'; Mensah 30'	Report	Touzghar 55'	Stadium: Parc des Sports; Attendance: 9,864; Referee: Frank Schneider

27 September 2014 8	Lorient	0–2	Evian	Lorient
20:00 CEST (UTC+02:00)	Koné (yellow card) 58'; Mesloub (red card) 90+2'	Report	Koné 2'; Ninković (yellow card) 20'; Sougou (yellow card) 45'; Barbosa 79'	Stadium: Stade du Moustoir; Attendance: 10,391; Referee: Mikael Lesage

4 October 2014 9	Evian	3–0	Metz	Annecy
20:00 CEST (UTC+02:00)	Camus (yellow card) 41'; Doukouré 62' (o.g.); Wass 75' (pen.); Bruno 81'; N'Sikulu (yellow card) 85'	Report	Kashi (yellow card) 5'; Métanire (yellow card) 22'; Doukouré (yellow card) 61'; Mfa Mezui (yellow card) 74'; Sarr (yellow card) 88'	Stadium: Parc des Sports; Attendance: 10,942; Referee: Lionel Jaffredo

18 October 2014 10	Monaco	2–0	Evian	Monaco
20:00 CEST (UTC+02:00)	Moutinho 2' (pen.); Bakayoko (yellow card) 43'; Toulalan (yellow card) 63'; Carrasco 71'; Silva (yellow card) 87'	Report	Barbosa (yellow card) 3'; Koné (yellow card) 59'; Tejeda (yellow card) 69'	Stadium: Stade Louis II; Attendance: 5,497; Referee: Olivier Thual

25 October 2014 11	Evian	0–2	Nantes	Annecy
20:00 CEST (UTC+02:00)	Tajeda (yellow card) 18'; Mongongu (yellow card) 42'	Report	Gomis (yellow card) 27'; Veretout 42' (pen.); Bammou (yellow card) 57', (goal) 75'	Stadium: Parc des Sports; Attendance: 10,063; Referee: Stéphane Lannoy

1 November 2014 12	Montpellier	2–0	Evian	Montpellier
20:00 CET (UTC+01:00)	Bérigaud 32', (yellow card) 64'; Mounier 90'; Deplagne 90+2'	Report	Tejeda (yellow card) 30'	Stadium: Altrad Stadium; Attendance: 8,440; Referee: Mikael Lesage

8 November 2014 13	Evian	1–0	Nice	Annecy
20:00 CET (UTC+01:00)	Angoula (yellow card) 70'; Wass 76'	Report	Amavi (yellow card) 34'; Mendy (yellow card) 75'; Pléa (yellow card) 89'	Stadium: Parc des Sports; Attendance: 7,738; Referee: Nicolas Rainville

30 November 2014 15	Evian	2–0	Guingamp	Annecy
17:00 CET (UTC+01:00)	Mongongu (yellow card) 4'; Wass 59'; Bille Nielsen 81'	Report	Sankoh (yellow card) 12'	Stadium: Parc des Sports; Attendance: 10,665; Referee: Fredy Fautrel

3 December 2014 16	Bastia	1–2	Evian	Furiani
19:00 CET (UTC+01:00)	Abdallah 35' (o.g.); Cahuzac (yellow card) 56'; Kamano (yellow card) 63'; Areola (yellow card) 89'; Palmieri (yellow card) 90'	Report	Cambon (yellow card) 4'; Wass 65', (yellow card) 90'; N'Sikulu 83', (yellow card) 89'	Stadium: Stade Armand Cesari; Attendance: 10,902; Referee: Bartolomeu Varela

7 December 2014 17	Evian	2–3	Lyon	Annecy
14:00 CET (UTC+01:00)	Koné (yellow card) 18'; Barbosa 28', 64'; Sorlin (yellow card) 61'	Report	Malbranque (yellow card) 28'; Dabo (yellow card) 34'; Biševac (yellow card) 41'; Benzia 62'; Lacazette 81', 90+4' (pen.)	Stadium: Parc des Sports; Attendance: 13,064; Referee: Tony Chapron

13 December 2014 18	Reims	3–2	Evian	Reims
20:00 CET (UTC+01:00)	Oniangue (yellow card) 6'; Diego 14', 80'; Charbonnier (yellow card) 30'; Signorino (yellow card) 68'; Mandi 78'	Report	Abdallah (yellow card) 29'; Tejeda (yellow card) 45'; Sougou (yellow card) 46'; Wass 57'; Cambon 69', (red card) 79'	Stadium: Stade Auguste Delaune; Attendance: 11,011; Referee: Benoît Millot

21 December 2014 19	Saint-Étienne	3–0	Evian	Saint-Étienne
17:00 CET (UTC+01:00)	Gradel 2' van Wolfswinkel 20'; Brison (yellow card) 62'; Hamouma 65'	Report		Stadium: Stade Geoffroy-Guichard; Attendance: 33,017; Referee: Amaury Delerue

7 January 2015 14	Lille	1–0	Evian	Villeneuve-d'Ascq
21:30 CET (UTC+01:00)	Traoré 61'	Report	Cambon (yellow card) 68'	Stadium: Stade Pierre-Mauroy; Attendance: 32,580; Referee: Nicolas Rainville

10 January 2015 20	Evian	1–1	Rennes	Annecy
20:00 CET (UTC+01:00)	Thomasson 62'; Olivier Sorlin (yellow card) 64'; Cambon (yellow card) 81'; Abdallah (yellow card) 90+1'	Report	Ntep 66'	Stadium: Parc des Sports; Attendance: 8,011; Referee: Antony Gautier

18 January 2015 21	Paris Saint-Germain	4–2	Evian	Paris
14:00 CET (UTC+01:00)	David Luiz 30', (yellow card) 81'; Verratti 38', (yellow card) 61'; Pastore (yellow card) 63', (goal) 74'; Cavani 89'	Report	Barbosa 14'; Van der Wiel 63' (o.g.); Thomasson (yellow card) 77'	Stadium: Parc des Princes; Attendance: 45,561; Referee: Bartolomeu Varela

25 January 2015 22	Evian	1–0	Toulouse	Annecy
14:00 CET (UTC+01:00)	Thomasson 4'	Report	Blin (yellow card) 57'; Ninkov (red card) 61'; Grigore (yellow card) 80'	Stadium: Parc des Sports; Attendance: 8,022; Referee: Benoît Bastien

31 January 2015 23	Marseille	1–0	Evian	Marseille
16:30 CET (UTC+01:00)	Gignac 49'	Report	Koné (yellow card) 28'; Fall (yellow card) 90+2'	Stadium: Stade Vélodrome; Attendance: 46,579; Referee: Frank Schneider

7 February 2015 24	Evian	0–1	Bordeaux	Annecy
20:00 CET (UTC+01:00)	Sunu (yellow card) 49'	Report	Khazri 11', (yellow card) 67'; Mariano (yellow card) 42'; Contento (yellow card) 90+3'	Stadium: Parc des Sports; Attendance: 10,033; Referee: Lionel Jaffredo

14 February 2015 25	Lens	0–2	Evian	Amiens
20:00 CET (UTC+01:00)	Baal (yellow card) 43' (yellow-red card) 90+2'	Report	Duhamel 19', 35'; Sabaly (yellow card) 61'; Abdallah (yellow card) 67'; Wass (red card) 90+2'	Stadium: Stade de la Licorne; Attendance: 7,899; Referee: Ruddy Buquet

28 February 2015 27	Metz	1–2	Evian	Metz
20:00 CET (UTC+01:00)	Philipps (yellow card) 22'; Palomino (yellow card) 30'; Rivierez (yellow card) 38'; Sarr 45'	Report	Carrasso 29' (o.g.); Duhamel (yellow card) 45+2'; Sunu 73'	Stadium: Stade Saint-Symphorien; Attendance: 16,286; Referee: Philippe Kalt

4 March 2015 26	Evian	1–0	Lorient	Annecy
19:00 CET (UTC+01:00)	Cambon (yellow card) 19'; N'Sikulu 25'; Barbosa (yellow card) 59'; Koné (yellow card) 89'	Report	Bellugou (yellow card) 66'; Gassama (yellow card) 89'; Ayew (yellow card) 90+1'	Stadium: Parc des Sports; Attendance: 7,635; Referee: Frank Schneider

7 March 2015 28	Evian	1–3	Monaco	Annecy
20:00 CET (UTC+01:00)	Sougou 78'	Report	Martial 18'; Abdallah 18' (o.g.); Touré 60'; Kondogbia (yellow card) 83'	Stadium: Parc des Sports; Attendance: 10,905; Referee: Nicolas Rainville

21 March 2015 30	Evian	1–0	Montpellier	Annecy
20:00 CET (UTC+01:00)	Mongongu (yellow card) 23'; N'Sikulu 85'; Thomasson (yellow card) 88'	Report		Stadium: Parc des Sports; Attendance: 8,730; Referee: Mikaël Lesage

4 April 2015 31	Nice	2–2	Evian	Nice
CEST (UTC+02:00)	Pouplin (yellow card) 9'; Gomis (yellow card) 16'; Bosetti 45+1', (yellow card) 75'; Eysseric 68'; Amavi (yellow card) 87'; Bauthéac (yellow card) 90+3'	Report	Nounkeu 18'; Nielsen (yellow card) 30'; Tejeda (yellow card) 56'; Gomis 78' (o.g.); Abdallah (yellow card) 87'; Sougou (yellow card) 90+3'	Stadium: Allianz Riviera; Attendance: 18,581; Referee: Stéphane Lannoy

12 April 2015 32	Evian	0–1	Lille	Annecy
17:00 CEST (UTC+02:00)	Ninković (yellow card) 22'; Nounkeu (yellow card) 80'; Cambon (yellow card) 81'; Sougou (yellow card) 85'	Report	Kjær (yellow card) 37'; Boufal 81' (pen.); Corchia (yellow card) 90+3'	Stadium: Parc des Sports; Attendance: 9,986; Referee: Fredy Fautrel

18 April 2015 33	Guingamp	1–1	Evian	Guingamp
20:00 CEST (UTC+02:00)	Beauvue 44'; Mathis (yellow card) 52'	Report	Blandi (yellow card) 31', (goal) 50'; Sabaly (yellow card) 74'	Stadium: Stade du Roudourou; Attendance: 13,788; Referee: Ruddy Buquet

25 April 2015 34	Evian	1–2	Bastia	Annecy
20:00 CEST (UTC+02:00)	Sunu 42'	Report	Ayité (yellow card) 45+1'; Kamano 57', 87'; Boudebouz (yellow card) 61'	Stadium: Parc des Sports; Attendance: 8,521; Referee: Sébastien Moreira

2 May 2015 35	Lyon	2–0	Evian	Lyon
17:00 CEST (UTC+02:00)	Grenier 21'; Lacazette 38' (pen.); Gonalons (yellow card) 65'	Report	Nounkeu (yellow card) 38'	Stadium: Stade de Gerland; Attendance: 36,839; Referee: Benoit Bastien

9 May 2015 36	Evian	2–3	Reims	Annecy
20:00 CEST (UTC+02:00)	Wass (yellow card) 25'; Nounkeu (yellow card) 29'; Sunu 45+3'; Duhamel 48'	Report	Ngog (yellow card) 11', (goal) 40', 64'; Albæk (yellow card) 60'; Moukandjo 85', (yellow card) 85'	Stadium: Parc des Sports; Attendance: 13,740; Referee: Lionel Jaffredo

16 May 2015 37	Evian	1–2	Saint-Étienne	Annecy
21:00 CEST (UTC+02:00)	Juelsgård (yellow card) 35'; Sorlin (yellow card) 41'; Duhamel 42'; Mongongu (yellow card) 76'; Cambon (yellow card) 81'; Abdallah (yellow card) 88' (red card) 90'	Report	Gradel 12', 82'; Brison (yellow card) 25'	Stadium: Parc des Sports; Attendance: 14,382; Referee: Ruddy Buquet

23 May 2015 38	Caen	3–2	Evian	Caen
21:00 CEST (UTC+02:00)	Bazile 60', 68'; Sougou 66' (o.g.)	Report	Thomasson (yellow card) 37'; Sorlin 86'; Sougou 90+3'	Stadium: Stade Michel d'Ornano; Attendance: 19,937; Referee: Antony Gautier

=== Coupe de la Ligue ===
28 October 2014 Round of 32	Evian	1–2	Lorient	Annecy
20:00 CEST (UTC+02:00)	Wass 7'; Mensah (yellow card) 58' (yellow-red card) 90'; Ninković (yellow card) 65'	Report	Lavigne 15'; Ayew 73'	Stadium: Parc des Sports; Attendance: 4,526; Referee: Clément Turpin

=== Coupe de France ===
3 January 2015 Round of 64	AF Bobigny	0–3	Evian	Reims
15:15 CET (UTC+01:00)	Badji (yellow card) 55'	Report	Camus 68'; Nielsen 76'; Wass 90+3'	Stadium: Stade Auguste Delaune; Attendance: 4,500; Referee: Jean-Charles Cailleux

21 January 2015 Round of 32	Monaco	2–0	Evian	Monaco
17:00 CET (UTC+01:00)	Ocampos 63'; Martial 88'	Summary	N'Sikulu (yellow card) 56'	Stadium: Stade Louis II; Attendance: 800; Referee: Clement Turpin
