= 2004–05 in Danish football =

Football in Denmark
- Season: 2004–05

The 2004-05 season in Danish football, starting July 2004 and ending June 2005:

== Events ==
- 20 July 2004: FC København won the Super Cup at Parken Stadium after a 2-1 victory against AaB.
- 24 July 2004: The Superliga kicks off.
- 31 July 2004: The 1st Division kicks off.
- 31 July 2004: The 2nd Division kicks off.
- 4 August 2004: FC København are beaten by Slovenian NK Gorica 2-6 agg. in the second qualifying round in the UEFA Champions League.
- 26 August 2004: AaB beats Lithuanian FK Žalgiris Vilnius 3-1 agg. and Brøndby IF are beaten by Latvian FK Ventspils 1-1 (ag) in All this in the UEFA Cup's second qualifying round.
- 30 September 2004: AaB are beaten by French AJ Auxerre in the UEFA Cup first round.
- 11 November 2004: Royal League kicks off.
- December 2004: Yearly awards by the players association:
  - 2004 Danish Superliga profile: Mohamed Zidan, FC Midtjylland
  - 2004 Danish 1st Division profile: Jacob Olesen, SønderjyskE
  - 2004 Danish 2nd Division profile: Christian Holst, Lyngby BK
  - 2004 team of the year: Thomas Sørensen (Aston Villa), Daniel Agger (BIF), Leon Andreasen (AGF), Per Krøldrup (Udinese), Niclas Jensen (Dortmund), Thomas Kahlenberg (BIF), Thomas Gravesen (Everton), Martin Retov (BIF), Steffen Højer (OB), Jon Dahl Tomasson (AC Milan), Mohamed Zidan (FCM).
  - 2004 talent of the year: Daniel Agger, Brøndby IF
- 28 December 2004: Yearly awards by Sports Confederation of Denmark:
  - 2004 Danish footballer of the year: Jon Dahl Tomasson, AC Milan
  - 2004 best goal in the Superliga: Martin Ericsson, AaB against Herfølge BK on 24 October
- Late December 2004 2004 Goalie of the year: Jimmy Nielsen, AaB
- 24 February 2005: FC København, Brøndby IF, Esbjerg fB and OB played their last game in the Royal League group stage against IFK Göteborg (1-0), Tromsø IL (4-2), Vålerenga I.F. (1-1) and Malmö FF (1-2). FC København were the only Danish team going to the second round.
- 28 April 2005: FC København played their last game in the Royal League 2nd group stage against Malmö FF 2-1. FCK will go to the final, only if Malmö FF and Rosenborg ended with a draw or an MFF win.
- 5 May 2005: Brøndby IF won the final in the Danish Cup after extra time 3-2 against FC Midtjylland at Parken, Copenhagen.
- 12 May 2005: FC København went to the final in Royal League, after a 4-2 Malmö FF win against Rosenborg.
- 16 May 2005: Brøndby IF won a record high 5-0 win against arch-rivals FC København
- 26 May 2005: FC København won the final in Royal League against IFK Göteborg after a very exciting penalty shootout the match ended 12-11.
- 11 June 2005: Brøndby IF guaranteed the championship.
- 12 June 2005: Kolding FC guaranteed the 2nd Division championship.
- 18 June 2005: Last round in the 1st Division were played. SønderjyskE ended as champions.
- 18 June 2005: Last round in the 2nd Division were played.
- 19 June 2005: Last round in the Superliga were played.

== National team results ==
Date	Venue	Opponents	Score*	Competition	Denmark scorers	Match Report
August 18, 2004	KS Lech Stadium, Poznań (A)	Poland	5-1	F	Peter Madsen (3x), Thomas Gaardsøe, Claus Jensen
September 4, 2004	Parken Stadium, Copenhagen (H)	Ukraine	1-1	WCQ2	Martin Jørgensen	UEFA
October 9, 2004	Qemal Stafa, Tirana (A)	Albania	2-0	WCQ2	Martin Jørgensen, Jon Dahl Tomasson	UEFA
October 13, 2004	Parken Stadium, Copenhagen (H)	Turkey	1-1	WCQ2	Jon Dahl Tomasson	UEFA
November 17, 2004	Locomotive Stadium, Tbilisi (A)	Georgia	2-2	WCQ2	Jon Dahl Tomasson (2x)	UEFA
February 9, 2005	G. Karaiskaki, Athens (A)	Greece	1-2	WCQ2	Dennis Rommedahl	UEFA
March 26, 2005	Parken Stadium, Copenhagen (H)	Kazakhstan	3-0	WCQ2	Peter Møller (2x), Christian Poulsen	UEFA
March 30, 2005	NSC Olympiyskiy Stadium, Kyiv (A)	Ukraine	0-1	WCQ2		UEFA
June 2, 2005	Ratina Stadion, Tampere (A)	Finland	1-0	F	Michael Silberbauer
June 8, 2005	Parken Stadium, Copenhagen (H)	Albania	3-1	WCQ2	Søren Larsen (2x), Martin Jørgensen	UEFA

* Denmark scores first

Key

- H = Home match
- A = Away match
- N = Neutral site match
- F = Friendly
- WCQ2 = FIFA World Cup 2006 Qualifying, European Zone Group 2

== Honours ==
Competition	Winner	Additional information
SAS Ligaen	Brøndby IF	Herfølge BK and Randers FC relegated.
National Cup	Brøndby IF	See also Danish Cup 2004-05
Super Cup	FC København	Won 2-1 against AaB
Viasat Sport Divisionen	SønderjyskE	SønderjyskE and AC Horsens promoted; Dalum IF, Næstved BK and B 93 relegated.
2nd Division	Kolding FC	Kolding FC, Brabrand IF and Lyngby BK promoted; no relegation because of separation of 2nd division into west and east.

== See also ==
- 2004–05 Danish Superliga season
- 2004–05 Danish 1st Division season
- 2004–05 Danish Cup season
