= Jesper Hansen (footballer, born 1985) =

Danish footballer (born 1985)

Personal information
- Full name: Jesper Hansen
- Date of birth: 31 March 1985 (age 41)
- Place of birth: Slangerup, Denmark
- Height: 1.88 m (6 ft 2 in)
- Position: Goalkeeper

Team information
- Current team: AGF
- Number: 1

Youth career
- Ølstykke FC
- 2000–2003: Nordsjælland

Senior career*
Years	Team	Apps	(Gls)
2003–2013	Nordsjælland	153	(0)
2005	→ Ølstykke (loan)	30	(0)
2013–2015	Evian	37	(0)
2015–2016	Bastia	4	(0)
2016	Bastia II	2	(0)
2016–2017	Lyngby	35	(0)
2017–2021	Midtjylland	121	(0)
2021–	AGF	136	(0)

International career
2000–2001	Denmark U16	2	(0)
2001–2002	Denmark U17	7	(0)
2002	Denmark U18	1	(0)
2003–2004	Denmark U19	2	(0)
2004–2005	Denmark U20	5	(0)
- * Club domestic league appearances and goals as of 14 August 2026

Jesper Hansen (born 31 March 1985) is a Danish professional footballer who plays as a goalkeeper for AGF. He accumulated 18 youth caps for Denmark at six different age groups.

== Early life ==
Hansen played for Ølstykke FC during his youth career, before moving onto Farum BK in 2000.

== Senior career ==
=== F.C. Nordsjælland ===
Having shown potential to be a promising goalkeeper, Hansen was promoted to the Farum BK first team in January 2003 and signed his first contract extension in May 2003.

Having yet to make his debut for the first team, Hansen went on loan to Ølstykke FC in December 2004, the team he previously played for at youth level. He extended his stay at Ølstykke for an additional six months, where he was first choice goalkeeper for the team who were struggling to avoid regulation in the Danish 1st Division. He went on to make 37 league appearances during his year-long stay at Ølstykke.

He returned to F.C. Nordsjælland in November 2005 as backup for first team choice Kim Christensen, playing for FCN's reserve side in the Denmark Series.

In August 2007, having yet to make his league debut, with two first team appearances in cup competitions, Hansen renewed his contract for another four years. He claimed to have turned down first team opportunities from 1st Division clubs, to instead be patient and wait for his chance with FCN, whom he credited for his football education.

First choice goalkeeper and captain Kim Christensen was sold to IFK Göteborg on 13 March 2008. Theis F. Rasmussen was then brought in on a free, leaving speculation on who would be first choice to replace the departed Christensen. It was expected that Rasmussen was to be ahead of Hansen in selection, as was a common occurrence in the national youth team, though Hansen went go on to be first choice and Rasmussen failed to make a single league appearance during his two-season stay with F.C. Nordsjælland.

On 17 March 2008, head coach Morten Wieghorst gave Hansen his league debut, after almost five years as backup. He started the game in goal against F.C. Midtjylland, which they lost 1–0. His first clean sheet came a week later in a 1–0 win over Brøndby. Hansen went on to concede 26 goals in his first 15 appearances in the last half of the 2007–08 season, since his debut, giving FCN one of the worst defence records in the league, the team finished 9th in the league.

With F.C. Nordsjælland ending the first half of the 2008–09 season close to relegation, the club opted to bring in experienced Serbian goalkeeper Nenad Novaković on a free transfer, taking over as first choice, Hansen being demoted back to the bench for the rest of the season. The gamble paid off, as the club avoided relegation once again, finishing a slightly improved 8th in the league. At the start of the 2009–10 season, Hansen broke his thumb, ending any chance of him retaking the first choice position as goalkeeper for the duration of the injury. The situation resulted in the club bringing in Thomas Villadsen as backup for Novaković, on a temporary deal.

Mid season, after some poor performances from Novaković, Hansen was given a chance to retake the goalkeeping position, with a start against AGF, he managed to keep a clean sheet in a 2–0 win and consequently returned as first choice for FCN. He claimed after the match that being benched was a learning experience.

Hansen went on to make some instrumental performances for the rest of the season, including a strong performance against league champions F.C. Copenhagen, keeping a clean sheet in a shock 2–0 win, as well as being credited for keeping the Farum club alive in their 3–1 Danish cup quarter final win against Silkeborg. Hansen went on to be part of the Danish cup winning squad, his first senior trophy, in a 2–0 win over F.C. Midtjylland in the final.

Hansen retained his position as first choice the following 2010–11 season, with head coach Morten Wieghorst often praising his performances in the media. Hansen as well as the team slowly improved throughout the season, gaining on their previous league finish with 6th and once again went to the finals of the Danish cup, lifting the trophy for a second consecutive time, in a 3–2 win over FCM. With Hansen's contract expiring at the end of the season, there was speculation whether or not he would remain at the club. Jesper Hansen had hinted at trying something new, but nothing materialised. He eventually signed a new contract, keeping him at the club for another year, till summer 2012.

Starting the 2011–12 season for FCN in impressive form, with good performances against Sporting Lisbon and HB Køge and helping the team peak to 2nd in the Danish Superliga, Hansen is linked with a possible move abroad, with foreign clubs taking note of his recent form. Hansen's agent stating that he may leave the club on a transfer during the winter of 2011, or on a free when his contract expires in the summer of 2012. On 24 September 2011, in a match with AGF, Hansen was involved in a collision with striker Søren Larsen, which resulted in Hansen going off in the 44th minute and was rushed to hospital. He was diagnosed with a concussion and spent the next few days in hospital to be monitored. Hansen returned to action on 15 October, keeping a clean sheet in a 1–0 win over AaB. At the start of the winter break, Jesper Hansen signed a new two-year contract extension with F.C. Nordsjælland.

=== Evian ===
In August 2013, Hansen signed with Evian on a three-year contract. Brought in as a backup to Bertrand Laquait, he nonetheless developed into a starter during the 2013–14 season.

Halfway through the 2014–15 season, Hansen was benched for Benjamin Leroy who had joined the club from Tours ahead of the campaign. Evian suffered relegation at the end of the season, and Hansen continued as the backup to Leroy in the 2015–16 Ligue 2 season.

=== Bastia ===
On 8 August 2015, SC Bastia announced the signing of Hansen.

=== Lyngby Boldklub ===
On 22 June 2016, Hansen returns to his native Denmark and signed a three-year contract for Denmark club Lyngby Boldklub.

== International career ==
In January 2006, during a mini-tournament in Chile, Hansen saved a penalty in a penalty shootout for the Danish under-21s to book a place in the finals against Unión Española. They would go on to win 1–0 with a goal from Morten Rasmussen. Hansen was selected for the Denmark U21 squad for UEFA U-21 Championship 2006 in Portugal. He was third choice behind Kevin Stuhr Ellegaard and Theis F. Rasmussen.

On 3 November 2011, Hansen received his first call up to the senior national team to face Sweden in a friendly. Hansen was once again called up in December 2011, for Denmark's tour of Thailand in January.

In May 2018, he was named in Denmark's preliminary 35-man squad for the 2018 World Cup in Russia. However, he did not make the final 23.

== Personal life ==
Hansen has stated that he has been a fan of Juventus since Zinedine Zidane moved to the Turin based club, and that his idol is Gianluigi Buffon. His dream move would be to go to Juventus as Buffon's successor.

== Career statistics ==
As of match played 16 September 2026

Appearances and goals by club, season and competition
Club	Season	League			National cup		League cup		Europe		Total	
Club	Season	Division	Apps	Goals	Apps	Goals	Apps	Goals	Apps	Goals	Apps	Goals
Nordsjælland	2003–04	Danish Superliga	0	0	0	0	—		0	0	0	0
Nordsjælland	2004–05	Danish Superliga	0	0	0	0	—		—		0	0
Nordsjælland	2005–06	Danish Superliga	0	0	—		—		—		0	0
Nordsjælland	2006–07	Danish Superliga	0	0	0	0	—		—		0	0
Nordsjælland	2007–08	Danish Superliga	15	0	0	0	—		—		15	0
Nordsjælland	2008–09	Danish Superliga	18	0	0	0	—		6	0	24	0
Nordsjælland	2009–10	Danish Superliga	21	0	6	0	—		—		27	0
Nordsjælland	2010–11	Danish Superliga	33	0	5	0	—		1	0	39	0
Nordsjælland	2011–12	Danish Superliga	32	0	2	0	—		2	0	36	0
Nordsjælland	2012–13	Danish Superliga	33	0	0	0	—		6	0	39	0
Nordsjælland	2013–14	Danish Superliga	2	0	—		—		0	0	2	0
Nordsjælland	Total		153	0	13	0	—		15	0	181	0
Ølstykke (loan)	2004–05	Danish 1st Division	15	0	0	0	—		—		15	0
Ølstykke (loan)	2005–06	Danish 1st Division	15	0	0	0	—		—		15	0
Ølstykke (loan)	Total		30	0	0	0	—		—		30	0
Evian	2013–14	Ligue 1	22	0	1	0	1	0	—		24	0
Evian	2014–15	Ligue 1	15	0	0	0	0	0	—		15	0
Evian	2015–16	Ligue 2	0	0	—		—		—		0	0
Evian	Total		37	0	1	0	1	0	—		39	0
Bastia	2015–16	Ligue 1	4	0	1	0	1	0	—		6	0
Bastia II	2015–16	CFA 2	2	0	—		—		—		2	0
Lyngby	2016–17	Danish Superliga	35	0	0	0	—		—		35	0
Midtjylland	2017–18	Danish Superliga	35	0	2	0	—		8	0	45	0
Midtjylland	2018–19	Danish Superliga	34	0	5	0	—		6	0	45	0
Midtjylland	2019–20	Danish Superliga	34	0	1	0	—		2	0	37	0
Midtjylland	2020–21	Danish Superliga	18	0	3	0	—		8	0	29	0
Midtjylland	Total		121	0	11	0	—		24	0	156	0
AGF	2021–22	Danish Superliga	31	0	2	0	—		2	0	35	0
AGF	2022–23	Danish Superliga	32	0	3	0	—		—		35	0
AGF	2023–24	Danish Superliga	13	0	1	0	—		1	0	15	0
AGF	2024–25	Danish Superliga	28	0	3	0	—		—		31	0
AGF	2025–26	Danish Superliga	30	0	6	0	—		—		36	0
AGF	2026–27	Danish Superliga	2	0	1	0	—		1	0	4	0
AGF	Total		136	0	16	0	—		4	0	156	0
Career total			518	0	9	0	2	0	43	0	572	0

== Honours ==
FC Nordsjælland

- Danish Superliga: 2011–12
- Danish Cup: 2009–10, 2010–11

FC Midtjylland

- Danish Superliga: 2017–18, 2019–20
- Danish Cup: 2018–19

AGF

- Danish Superliga: 2025–26
