= Daniel Wass =

Danish footballer (born 1989)

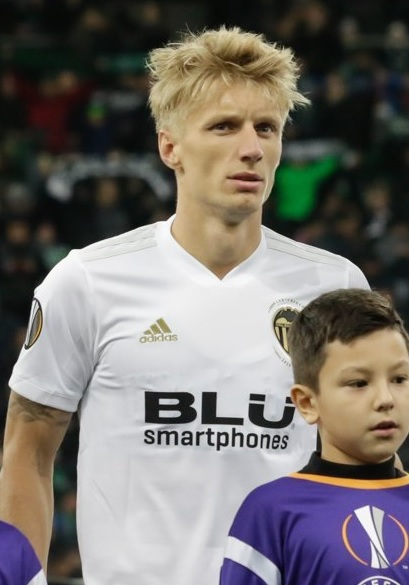
- Wass with Valencia in 2019

Personal information
- Full name: Daniel Wass
- Date of birth: 31 May 1989 (age 37)
- Place of birth: Brøndbyøster, Denmark
- Height: 1.81 m (5 ft 11 in)
- Positions: Midfielder; full-back

Team information
- Current team: Brøndby
- Number: 10

Youth career
- 1993–2006: Avarta
- 2006–2007: Brøndby

Senior career*
| Years | Team | Apps | (Gls) |
| 2007–2011 | Brøndby | 85 | (8) |
| 2009 | → Fredrikstad (loan) | 3 | (1) |
| 2011–2012 | Benfica | 0 | (0) |
| 2011–2012 | → Évian (loan) | 29 | (4) |
| 2012–2015 | Évian | 104 | (19) |
| 2015–2018 | Celta Vigo | 103 | (9) |
| 2018–2022 | Valencia | 152 | (10) |
| 2022 | Atlético Madrid | 1 | (0) |
| 2022– | Brøndby | 110 | (7) |

International career^{‡}
| 2005 | Denmark U16 | 3 | (0) |
| 2005–2006 | Denmark U17 | 14 | (0) |
| 2006–2007 | Denmark U18 | 4 | (0) |
| 2007–2008 | Denmark U19 | 8 | (2) |
| 2008 | Denmark U20 | 1 | (0) |
| 2008–2011 | Denmark U21 | 14 | (0) |
| 2011–2022 | Denmark | 44 | (1) |
- * Club domestic league appearances and goals as of 19:20, 11 May 2026 (UTC) ‡ National team caps and goals as of 22 September 2022

Daniel Wass (Danish pronunciation: [ˈtɛˀnjəl ˈvæs]; born 31 May 1989) is a Danish professional footballer who plays as a midfielder or full-back for Danish Superliga club Brøndby, which he captains. He announced his retirement from professional football, when his contract with Brøndby expires in the summer of 2027. After his retirement he will continue in the club organization.

A product of Avarta and Brøndby's youth academy, Wass made his senior debut for Brøndby in the 2007–08 Superliga season and established himself in the side over the following years before transferring to Benfica in 2011. After being loaned to Évian, where he subsequently signed on a permanent basis, he spent three seasons in France before moves to Celta Vigo in 2015 and Valencia in 2018. At Valencia he won the 2019 Copa del Rey, the first major honour of his career. A short spell at Atlético Madrid in 2022 was curtailed by a knee injury on his debut, after which he returned to Brøndby on a permanent transfer.

A former Denmark international, Wass made his debut in 2011 and was named in the country's squad for the 2022 FIFA World Cup in Qatar.

== Early life ==
Wass was born and grew up in Brøndby, in the western suburbs of Copenhagen. He started playing football aged four for Avarta in neighbouring Rødovre, its Espelunden ground being closer to his childhood home than Brøndby Stadium, and remained at the club for around ten years. On the recommendation of his Brøndby neighbour, the defender Pierre Kanstrup, he attended a trial at Brøndby IF and joined the club's academy in 2006, also attending Brøndby Gymnasium before graduating in 2008.

== Club career ==
=== Brøndby ===
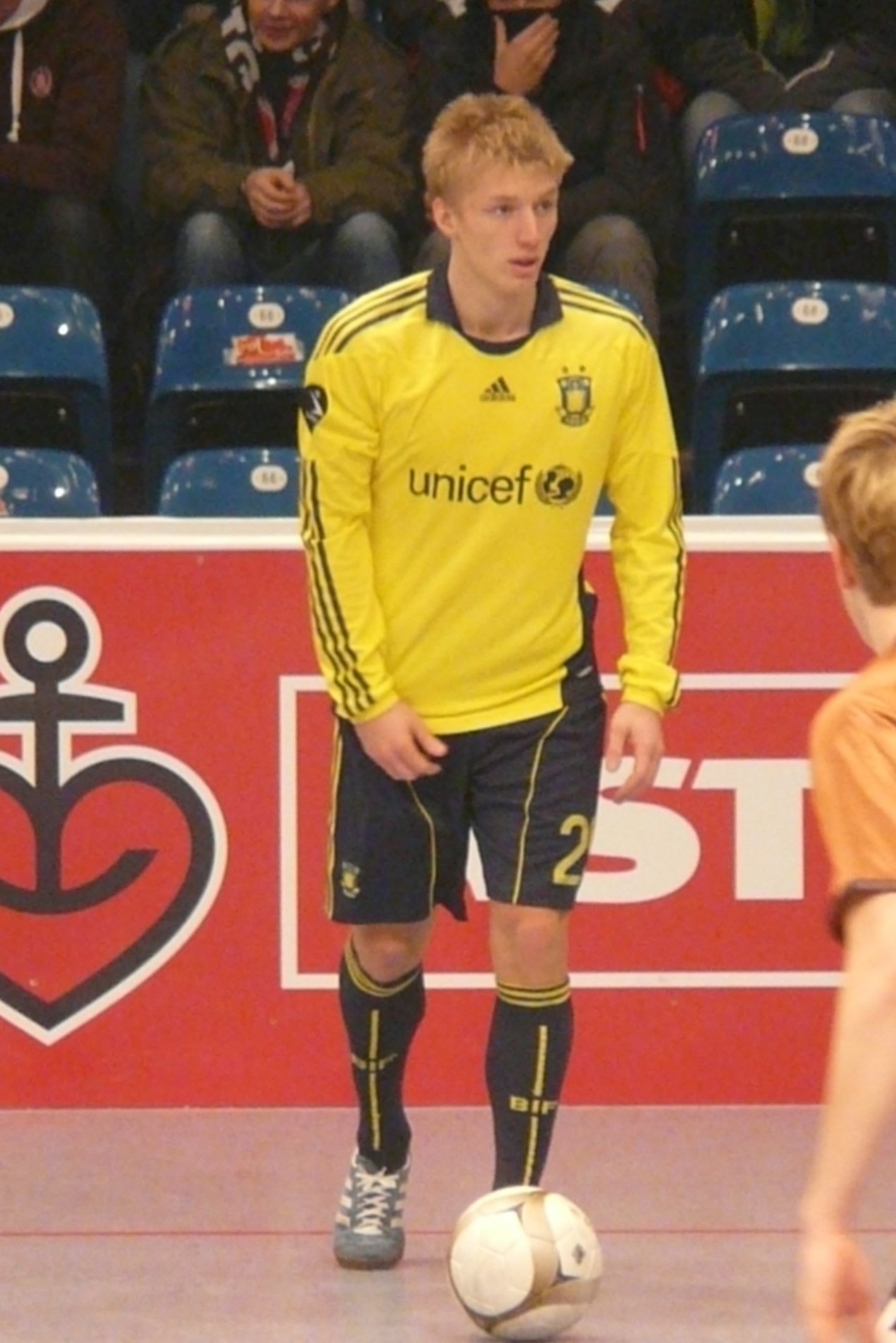
Wass with Brøndby in 2010

Wass made his Superliga debut for Brøndby on 28 October 2007, away to OB under manager Tom Køhlert. A knee injury cut his first season short, but he established himself as Brøndby's first-choice right-back in 2008–09, making 28 of a possible 33 league appearances as the club finished third in the Superliga.

In August 2009, Wass was loaned to the Norwegian top-flight side Fredrikstad. He made his debut on 21 August in a 4–1 defeat to Rosenborg and scored in a 5–0 win over Lyn on 1 November, but featured only three times before being recalled in December after the appointment of Tom Nordlie as manager; Nordlie favoured a more defensive profile at right-back.

Wass returned to Brøndby's starting line-up for the remainder of 2009–10 and held it for the opening 19 fixtures of 2010–11. In February 2011, he announced he would not be renewing his contract amid speculation of a summer transfer to Benfica. In March, manager Henrik Jensen moved him forward to right midfielder, in which role he scored three goals as Brøndby finished third for a third consecutive season.

=== Transfer to Benfica and loan to Évian ===
On 20 May 2011, Wass announced that he had signed a five-year contract with Benfica. However, on 22 July 2011, he was loaned out to Evian Thonon Gaillard F.C. without taking part in any official games for Benfica. Upon moving to Evian, Wass joined Danish countrymen Stephan Andersen, Christian Poulsen and Thomas Kahlenberg. In the four months after joining Evian, Wass was kept out of the first team under Bernard Casoni, who preferred Brice Dja Djédjé, while Wass stated his intention to return to his parent club. On 15 October 2011, he made his debut, playing in right midfield, making an impact when he provided assist for Yannick Sagbo in a 2–1 loss against Saint-Étienne. Several weeks later, Wass scored in two consecutive games against Lorient and Rennes. He scored his third goal of the season in a 2–1 loss against Toulouse. Under new manager Pablo Correa, who succeeded Casoni, Wass secured a place in the first team, mostly being used as left-back, with Sidney Govou taking his former position in right midfield. After months of being kept out of the first team, he returned again, playing in left-back, due to Fabrice Ehret. Wass kept his place in the first team towards the end of the season when Guillaume Lacour took his position as left back, this time returning to the right midfield position. Two games before the end of the season, Wass scored his fourth goal in a 2–1 win over Ajaccio.

=== Transfer to Évian ===
On 20 June 2012, Wass signed with Evian on a permanent basis for a €2.5 million transfer fee. On 12 August 2012, in the opening game of the season against Bordeaux, Wass scored a free kick in a match that ended in a 2–3 loss for Evian. Like in the previous season, Wass played in various positions in defence and midfield. On 26 January 2013, Wass scored a further goal against Ajaccio in a 1–1 draw.

=== Celta Vigo ===
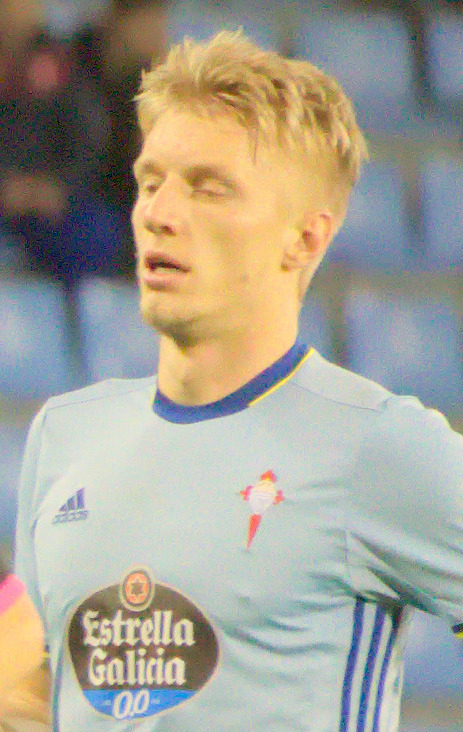
Wass playing for Celta Vigo in 2017

On 22 June 2015, Wass joined La Liga club Celta Vigo on a four-year contract for a reported €3 million fee, following Évian's relegation from Ligue 1. Inter Milan and Bayer Leverkusen had reportedly also approached him, but he chose Celta on the recommendation of Michael Krohn-Dehli, the Danish midfielder who had spent the previous three seasons at the club.

Used in midfield and on both flanks by head coach Eduardo Berizzo, Wass made 35 La Liga appearances in his first season as Celta finished sixth and qualified for the 2016–17 UEFA Europa League. The following season, he was an ever-present in the European campaign and one of only three players to feature in all 13 of his side's Europa League fixtures. Wass scored against Panathinaikos in the group stage and against Krasnodar in the round of 16, before Celta were eliminated in the semi-finals by Manchester United over two legs in May 2017. Domestically, Celta also reached the semi-finals of the Copa del Rey before being eliminated by Alavés.

On 7 January 2018, Wass scored once and assisted Iago Aspas's winner in a 2–2 draw against Real Madrid at the Santiago Bernabéu. At the end of the season, Wass said his time at Celta had come to an end. He had made 136 appearances and scored 14 goals across all competitions in three seasons at the club.

=== Valencia ===
On 10 July 2018, Wass joined Valencia on a four-year deal for a fee reported to be €6 million. He made his debut for the club on 20 August in La Liga, providing an assist to Rodrigo's equaliser in a 1–1 home draw against Atlético Madrid. His first goal for Los che came on 14 April 2019 in a 3–1 away win against Villarreal in the UEFA Europa League. Wass was a starter in the 2019 Copa del Rey Final which saw Valencia lift the trophy after a 2–1 victory against Barcelona, his first ever career title.

On 27 November 2019, Wass scored on an overcooked cross from a tight angle, which surprised goalkeeper Kepa Arrizabalaga and allowed Valencia to finish top of their UEFA Champions League group. The match finished 2–2.

=== Atlético Madrid ===
On 27 January 2022, Atlético Madrid announced the signing of Wass on a contract until 2023. He made his competitive debut for the club on 6 February, coming off the bench at half-time for Šime Vrsaljko in a 4–2 loss away against Barcelona at Camp Nou. The appearance would remain his only one for the Colchoneros, as he suffered a season-ending knee injury after a challenge by Ferran Torres.

=== Return to Brøndby ===
On 12 August 2022, Wass returned to Brøndby IF on a permanent transfer from Atlético Madrid. He made his return debut two days later in a Superliga match against OB, starting at right-back in a 2–0 home win.

Brøndby had announced on 24 July 2022 that Wass would sign a contract through June 2025, marking a return to where he started his professional career.

Ahead of the 2024–25 season, head coach Jesper Sørensen removed Wass from the role of team captain. Following Sørensen's departure and the appointment of Frederik Birk as head coach, Wass was reinstated as captain at the beginning of the 2025–26 season.

Brøndby began the 2025–26 Superliga season with a win under Wass's captaincy, placing them first in the league table after the opening round.

On 5 March 2025, Brøndby extended Wass's contract by an additional year, tying him to the club through June 2026 and including a future non-playing club role upon retirement.

== International career ==
Wass made his Danish international debut against England on 9 February 2011.

In May 2018, Wass was named in Denmark's preliminary 35-man squad for the 2018 World Cup in Russia. However, he did not make the final 23.

In October 2016, Wass declined a call up to the Danish national team due to a supposed injury, but still played in the following match against Celta Vigo, which led Danish coach Åge Hareide to drop him from the national team. In May 2019 the two put their disagreements behind them, and Wass was once again called up to the Danish national team.

In November 2022, Wass was included in Denmark's 26-man squad for the 2022 World Cup in Qatar. However, he didn't start in any games as Denmark went on to be eliminated in the group stages without registering a single win.

== Personal life ==
Wass and his wife, Mie (née Jensen), have been together since 2007 and have two daughters. Mie, herself a former sportswoman, gave up her own athletic career to follow Wass abroad through his moves to France and Spain. Wass' father was treated for cancer during the early years of his professional career; Wass has described the experience as formative in his 2025 autobiography Bolden og basen. He is a first cousin of the former Denmark international footballer Nicki Bille Nielsen.

In October 2020, while playing for Valencia, Wass invested in InchByInch, a Danish digital platform that connects young footballers with established professionals for paid mentorship. In May 2024, he became a co-owner of the Danish ice hockey club Rødovre Mighty Bulls alongside the Brøndby chairman Jan Bech Andersen, the former Brøndby captain Andreas Maxsø and the Stanley Cup-winning Lars Eller, among others. The new ownership cleared the club's debt after a season in which it had come close to bankruptcy.

Wass' autobiography Bolden og basen, co-written with the journalist Gitte Søby Madsen, was published by Grønningen 1 in October 2025.

== Career statistics ==
=== Club ===
As of match played 21 May 2026

Appearances and goals by club, season and competition
| Club | Season | League | | | National cup (Note: Includes Danish Cup, Coupe de France, Copa del Rey) | | League cup (Note: Includes Coupe de la Ligue) | | Europe | | Other | | Total | |
| Club | Season | Division | Apps | Goals | Apps | Goals | Apps | Goals | Apps | Goals | Apps | Goals | Apps | Goals |
|---|---|---|---|---|---|---|---|---|---|---|---|---|---|---|
| Brøndby | 2007–08 | Danish Superliga | 13 | 0 | — | | — | | — | | — | | 13 | 0 |
| Brøndby | 2008–09 | Danish Superliga | 28 | 0 | 3 | 0 | — | | 5 (Note: Appearance(s) in UEFA Europa League) | 1 | — | | 36 | 1 |
| Brøndby | 2009–10 | Danish Superliga | 12 | 2 | — | | — | | — | | — | | 12 | 2 |
| Brøndby | 2010–11 | Danish Superliga | 32 | 6 | 1 | 1 | — | | 6 | 0 | — | | 39 | 7 |
| Brøndby | Total | | 85 | 8 | 4 | 1 | 0 | 0 | 11 | 1 | 0 | 0 | 100 | 10 |
| Fredrikstad (loan) | 2009 | Tippeligaen | 3 | 1 | — | | — | | — | | — | | 3 | 1 |
| Benfica | 2011–12 | Primeira Liga | 0 | 0 | — | | — | | — | | — | | 0 | 0 |
| Évian (loan) | 2011–12 | Ligue 1 | 29 | 4 | 1 | 0 | 1 | 0 | — | | — | | 31 | 4 |
| Évian | 2012–13 | Ligue 1 | 34 | 2 | 5 | 0 | 0 | 0 | — | | — | | 39 | 2 |
| Évian | 2013–14 | Ligue 1 | 38 | 9 | 1 | 0 | 3 | 2 | — | | — | | 42 | 11 |
| Évian | 2014–15 | Ligue 1 | 32 | 8 | 2 | 1 | 1 | 1 | — | | — | | 35 | 10 |
| Évian | Total | | 104 | 19 | 8 | 1 | 4 | 3 | 0 | 0 | 0 | 0 | 116 | 23 |
| Celta Vigo | 2015–16 | La Liga | 36 | 2 | 7 | 1 | — | | — | | — | | 43 | 3 |
| Celta Vigo | 2016–17 | La Liga | 32 | 3 | 8 | 2 | — | | 14 | 2 | — | | 54 | 7 |
| Celta Vigo | 2017–18 | La Liga | 35 | 4 | 4 | 0 | — | | — | | — | | 39 | 4 |
| Celta Vigo | Total | | 103 | 9 | 19 | 3 | 0 | 0 | 14 | 2 | 0 | 0 | 136 | 14 |
| Valencia | 2018–19 | La Liga | 32 | 1 | 8 | 0 | — | | 10 (Note: Seven appearances and one goal in UEFA Europa League, three appearances in UEFA Champions League) | 1 | — | | 50 | 2 |
| Valencia | 2019–20 | La Liga | 35 | 1 | 1 | 0 | — | | 8 (Note: Appearance(s) in UEFA Champions League) | 1 | 1 (Note: Appearance(s) in Supercopa de España) | 0 | 45 | 2 |
| Valencia | 2020–21 | La Liga | 35 | 4 | 1 | 0 | — | | — | | — | | 36 | 4 |
| Valencia | 2021–22 | La Liga | 19 | 1 | 2 | 0 | — | | — | | — | | 21 | 1 |
| Valencia | Total | | 121 | 7 | 12 | 0 | 0 | 0 | 18 | 2 | 1 | 0 | 152 | 9 |
| Atlético Madrid | 2021–22 | La Liga | 1 | 0 | 0 | 0 | — | | 0 | 0 | — | | 1 | 0 |
| Brøndby | 2022–23 | Danish Superliga | 24 | 1 | 0 | 0 | — | | 0 | 0 | — | | 24 | 1 |
| Brøndby | 2023–24 | Danish Superliga | 31 | 3 | 3 | 0 | — | | — | | — | | 34 | 3 |
| Brøndby | 2024–25 | Danish Superliga | 30 | 2 | 5 | 1 | — | | 3 (Note: Appearances in UEFA Conference League) | 1 | — | | 38 | 4 |
| Brøndby | 2025–26 | Danish Superliga | 25 | 1 | 2 | 0 | — | | 6 | 1 | 1 (Note: Appearance in Danish Superliga play-off) | 0 | 34 | 2 |
| Brøndby | Total | | 110 | 7 | 10 | 1 | — | | 9 | 2 | 1 | 0 | 130 | 10 |
| Career total | | | 556 | 55 | 54 | 6 | 5 | 3 | 52 | 7 | 2 | 0 | 668 | 71 |

=== International ===
As of match played 22 September 2022

Appearances and goals by national team and year
| National team | Year | Apps | Goals |
|---|---|---|---|
| Denmark | 2011 | 4 | 0 |
| Denmark | 2012 | 5 | 0 |
| Denmark | 2013 | 1 | 0 |
| Denmark | 2014 | 1 | 0 |
| Denmark | 2015 | 3 | 0 |
| Denmark | 2016 | 2 | 0 |
| Denmark | 2017 | 0 | 0 |
| Denmark | 2018 | 0 | 0 |
| Denmark | 2019 | 4 | 0 |
| Denmark | 2020 | 6 | 0 |
| Denmark | 2021 | 15 | 1 |
| Denmark | 2022 | 3 | 0 |
| Total | | 44 | 1 |

Scores and results list Denmark's goal tally first, score column indicates score after each Wass goal.

List of international goals scored by Daniel Wass
| No. | Date | Venue | Opponent | Score | Result | Competition |
|---|---|---|---|---|---|---|
| 1 | 1 September 2021 | Parken Stadium, Copenhagen, Denmark | Scotland | 1–0 | 2–0 | 2022 FIFA World Cup qualification |

== Honours ==
Valencia

- Copa del Rey: 2018–19

== Bibliography ==
- Wass, Daniel; Madsen, Gitte Søby (2025). Bolden og basen (in Danish). Copenhagen: Grønningen 1. ISBN 978-87-7339-250-8.
