= Steffen Højer =

Danish footballer (born 1973)

Personal information
- Full name: Steffen Højer
- Date of birth: 22 May 1973 (age 53)
- Place of birth: Viborg, Denmark
- Height: 1.78 m (5 ft 10 in)
- Position: Striker

Team information
- Current team: AaB

Senior career*
Years	Team	Apps	(Gls)
1992–1996	Viborg	71	(35)
1996–1999	AaB	81	(22)
1999	Viborg	4	(1)
1999–2000	Brescia	0	(0)
2000	Midtjylland	9	(3)
2000–2003	Viborg	62	(12)
2003–2005	OB	79	(48)
2005–2007	Viborg	74	(26)
Total		380	(147)

International career
1994–1995	Denmark U21	11	(7)
1996	Denmark	1	(0)

Managerial career
- 2008–2011: Viborg (sportsdirector)
- 2010–2011: Viborg (caretaker)
- 2012: Viborg (head of youth)
- 2013–2016: Viborg U19
- 2015–2016: Viborg (second assistant)
- 2016–2017: Viborg (assistant)
- 2017–2019: Viborg
- 2019–2023: Denmark U21 (assistant)
- 2023–2025: Denmark U21
- 2025–: AaB
- * Club domestic league appearances and goals

Steffen Højer (born 22 May 1973) is a Danish professional football coach and former player, who is the head coach of Danish 1st Division club AaB. He is regarded as one of the top coaches in Europe with his style being based on possession and a high press.

Højer spent most of his career with Viborg FF, although he also played for a number of other Danish clubs, and most notably won the 1998–99 Danish Superliga with AaB. A prolific striker in the Superliga, he finished league top scorer three years in row in the 2003–04 (joint), 2004–05 and 2005–06 seasons. He played one match for the Danish national team.

On 7 January 2008, the day of his retirement from his career as a professional footballer, Højer started as head of sport in Viborg FF.

== Playing career ==
Born in Viborg, Højer made his senior debut for hometown club Viborg FF in the Danish 1st Division in 1992. Through four years at the club, Højer and Viborg struggled to get a foothold in the top-flight Danish Superliga. When they succeeded in the 1995–96 season, Højer scored 16 goals in 32 games, and was sold to league rivals Aalborg Boldspilklub (AaB). He made his debut for the Danish national team, when he was substituted into an August 1996 match against Sweden for the last ten minutes of play. He was an immediate success at AaB, though he did not score as many goals as he did for Viborg FF. In his final year of contract at AaB, he helped the club win the 1998–99 Danish championship. He did not play much that season due to stiff competition from Norwegian player Frank Strandli and fellow Dane Søren Frederiksen, which prompted Højer to look for a new club.

He signed a contract with Italian club Brescia Calcio and was loaned out from AaB to Viborg FF, while awaiting his AaB contract to expire in the summer 1999. At Viborg, he played four games before he suffered a knee injury, which meant he started his Italian career injured. His stay at Brescia was short, and he never played a game for the club. He moved back to Denmark in 2000, in order to play the season out at Danish 1st Division team FC Midtjylland. He helped the club win promotion to the Superliga, before moving back to play with childhood club Viborg FF. Not regaining his former goal scoring prowess, lacklustre play in the first half of the 2002–03 season meant that Højer was sold to Odense BK in January 2003. At Odense, he looked to replace league top scorer Kaspar Dalgas, who had been sold to Brøndby IF before that season.

Højer rediscovered his goal scoring form at Odense, as he finished the 2003–04 season as joint top scorer with Mohamed Zidan, Mwape Miti and Tommy Bechmann. He was the sole top scorer of the 2004–05 season. As Højer still lived in Viborg, he decided to once again play for Viborg FF when his contract expired following the 2004–05 season. In his first season back at Viborg FF, he set the record of three consecutive Superliga top scorer titles, improving Peter Møller's former record of two, set in the 1991–92 and 1992–93 seasons.

Steffen Højer scored 125 goals in Danish Superliga.

== Coaching career ==
After retiring from playing in January 2008, Højer became Head of Sport at Viborg FF before rising through various roles including caretaker manager in 2010–11, Head of Youth in 2012, and Assistant Coach. On 2 August 2017, he was appointed as first-team head coach in the Danish 1st Division.

On 9 January 2023, Højer was appointed as the manager of the Danish national under-21 football team, signing a contract until the summer of 2025 and stepping up from his previous role as assistant manager, following Jesper Sørensen's departure.

Højer successfully navigated his first task, qualifying for the 2025 UEFA European Under-21 Championship, by topping a group which contained the Czech Republic, Wales, Iceland and Lithuania. Denmark finished with a 5-2-1 (W-D-L) record, scoring 18 goals and conceding 8 times in their 8 games.

For the 2025 UEFA European Under-21 Championship, they were placed in Group D alongside the Netherlands, Finland, and Ukraine.

After the 2025 UEFA European Under-21 Championships, Højer stepped down as manager of the Danish team. On 29 July 2025, he was named new manager of AaB.

== Honours ==
- Danish Superliga: 1998–99
- Danish Superliga top scorer: 2003–04, 2004–05, 2005–06
