= 2004–05 Danish 1st Division =

60th season of Danish 1st Division

Danish 1st Division
- Season: 2004–05

The 2004–05 Danish 1st Division season was the 60th season of the Danish 1st Division league championship and the 19th consecutive as a second tier competition governed by the Danish Football Association.

The division-champion and runner-up promoted to the 2005–06 Danish Superliga. The teams in the 14th, 15th and 16th places relegated between the 2nd Division east and west, based on location.

== Table ==
Pos	Team	Pld	W	D	L	GF	GA	GD	Pts	Promotion or relegation
1	SønderjyskE (C, P)	30	19	7	4	75	31	+44	64	Promotion to Danish Superliga
2	AC Horsens (P)	30	19	6	5	51	23	+28	63	Promotion to Danish Superliga
3	BK Frem	30	17	8	5	61	30	+31	59	
4	Køge BK	30	16	8	6	67	34	+33	56	
5	Vejle BK	30	14	7	9	59	51	+8	49	
6	BK Skjold	30	15	4	11	47	45	+2	49	
7	Hellerup IK	30	12	11	7	58	41	+17	47	
8	BK Fremad Amager	30	12	10	8	50	39	+11	46	
9	FC Fredericia	30	10	8	12	48	50	−2	38	
10	NFA	30	10	6	14	50	59	−9	36	
11	AB Copenhagen	30	10	5	15	49	52	−3	35	
12	Brønshøj BK	30	8	7	15	48	65	−17	31	
13	Ølstykke FC	30	8	6	16	39	68	−29	30	
14	Dalum IF (R)	30	8	3	19	47	81	−34	27	Relegation to Danish 2nd Divisions
15	Næstved BK (R)	30	6	2	22	30	71	−41	20	Relegation to Danish 2nd Divisions
16	B 93 (R)	30	3	8	19	41	80	−39	17	Relegation to Danish 2nd Divisions

Rules for classification: 1) points; 2) goal difference; 3) number of goals scored.
(C) Champions; (P) Promoted; (R) Relegated

== Top goalscorers ==
#	Player	Club	Goals
1	Jacob Olesen	SønderjyskE	21
=	Niels Lodberg	AC Horsens	21
3	Martin Lohse	NFA	18
4	Thomas Christensen	Hellerup IK	15
5	Ulrik Balling	Vejle BK	14

== See also ==
- 2004–05 in Danish football
- 2004–05 Danish Superliga
- 2005–06 Danish 1st Division
