= Heine Fernandez =

Danish footballer (born 1966)

Personal information
- Date of birth: 14 July 1966 (age 60)
- Place of birth: Lynderup, Denmark
- Position: Forward

Youth career
- Møldrup/Tostrup
- Borup

Senior career*
Years	Team	Apps	(Gls)
1984–1985	Borup		
1986–1989	Viborg FF	130	(17)
1990–1998	Silkeborg IF	246	(96)
1998–2000	Viborg FF	58	(36)
2001–2002	F.C. Copenhagen	37	(12)
2002–2003	Akademisk Boldklub	57	(10)
2004–2005	HB Torshavn	22	(12)
Total		550	(183)

International career
1991	Denmark	1	(0)

Managerial career
- 2004–2005: HB Torshavn (player manager)
- * Club domestic league appearances and goals

Heine Fernandez (born Heine Lavrsen; 14 July 1966) is a Danish former professional footballer who played as a forward. He spent the bulk of his career with Viborg FF and Silkeborg IF. He has the Silkeborg IF club goalscoring record with 96 together with Henrik Pedersen.

== Club career ==
Fernandez was the top goal scorer in the 1998–99 Danish Superliga. Fernandez also represented Danish clubs F.C. Copenhagen and Akademisk Boldklub.

== International career ==
Fernandez made his debut for the Denmark national team in a September 1991 friendly match against Iceland, coming on as a substitute for Per Frandsen. It turned out to be his only international match.

== Honours ==
Silkeborg

- Danish Superliga: 1993–94
- UEFA Intertoto Cup: 1996

Viborg FF

- Danish Cup: 1999–2000
- Danish Super Cup: 2000
