= Alka (insurance) =

Alka Forsikring, formally Insurance Joint Stock Alka, is a Danish insurance company that was established in 1944. Alka provides accident and life insurance. It is owned by trade unions and associated organisations.

Alka was created by the merger of Workers' Life Insurance, founded in 1903 and Danish Cooperative Assurance, founded in 1929, both working with the Danish labor movement. Over its history, Alka has grown by a series of acquisitions: Alka bought Nordlyset Insurance from English Provincial in 1992; and in 1998, it took over the Danish subsidiary of the Swedish insurer, Salus Ansvar. In 2001, Alka bought by the German insurance group Allianz's Danish subsidiary.

Some 55% of Alka's shares are owned by trade unions, 35% by cooperative enterprises, including Arbejdernes Landsbank, and 10% by sister companies.

Alka is headquartered in Taastrup, Copenhagen. Their managing director is Jens Baerentsen.

Alka was the title sponsor of Danish Superliga between 2015-2018.

The company is a member of the co-operative movement.
