= Benjamin Leroy =

French footballer (born 1989)

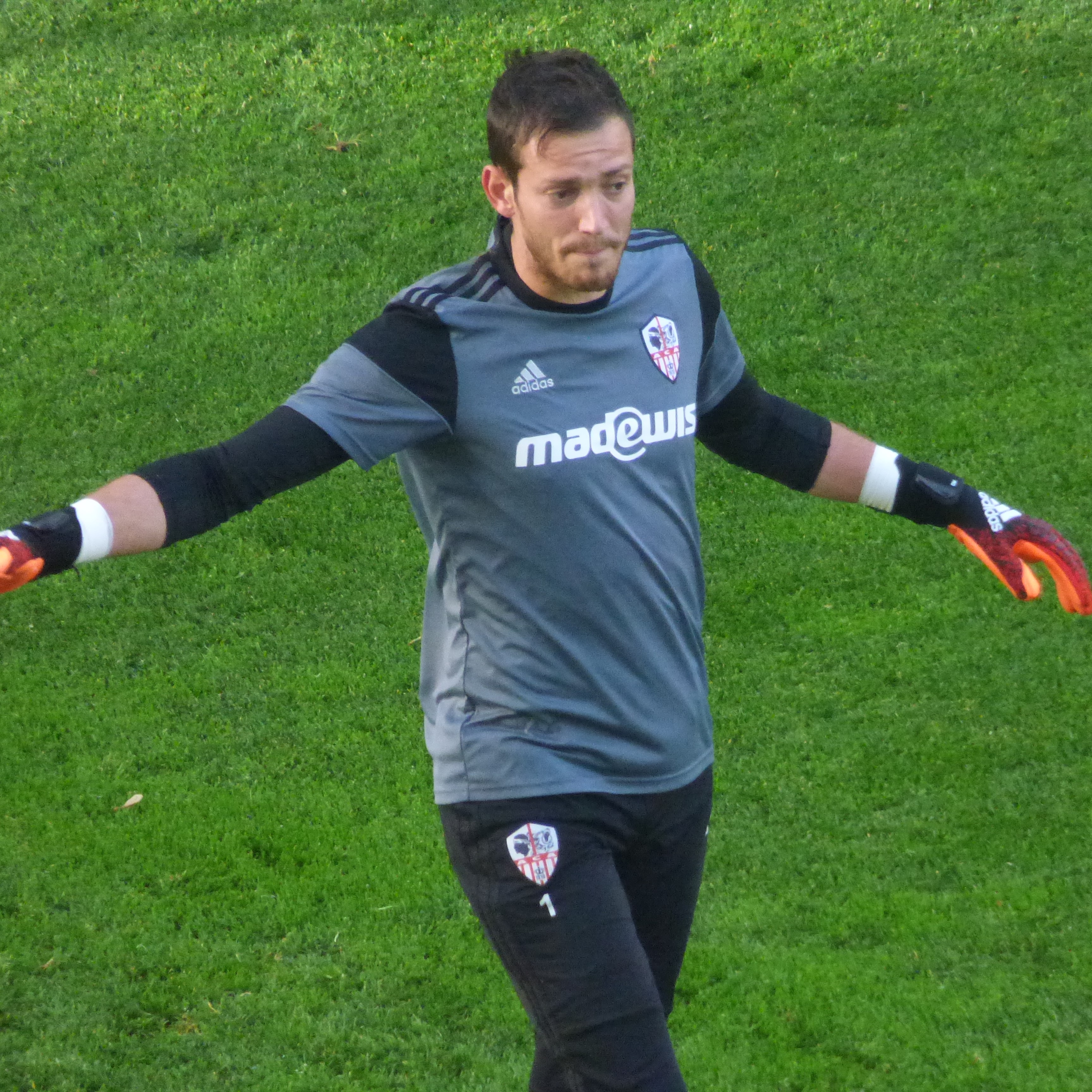
- Leroy with Ajaccio in 2018

Personal information
- Date of birth: 7 April 1989 (age 37)
- Place of birth: Cucq, France
- Height: 1.84 m (6 ft 0 in)
- Position: Goalkeeper

Team information
- Current team: Lorient
- Number: 1

Youth career
- Châteauroux

Senior career*
Years	Team	Apps	(Gls)
2009–2014	Tours	108	(0)
2014	Evian B	1	(0)
2014–2016	Evian	58	(0)
2016–2018	Dijon	1	(0)
2018–2023	Ajaccio	164	(0)
2023–2024	Quevilly-Rouen	36	(0)
2024–	Lorient	1	(0)
- * Club domestic league appearances and goals as of 21:15, 10 May 2025 (UTC)

Benjamin Leroy (born 7 April 1989) is a French professional footballer who plays as a goalkeeper for Ligue 1 club Lorient.

== Career ==
Leroy started his career with Châteauroux before joining Tours in 2009 and made his senior debut in the 0–1 defeat away to Sedan on 27 May 2011. Since the following season, Leroy became a regular in the first team and played over 100 league matches for Tours until the end of the 2013–14 Ligue 2 campaign.

In July 2014, he moved to Ligue 1 side Evian on a four-year contract. Halfway through the 2014–15 season, Leroy became the starter replacing Jesper Hansen in goal. Evian suffered relegation at the end of the season, and Leroy continued as the starter in the 2015–16 Ligue 2 season.

On 17 June 2016, Leroy signed a three-year contract with Dijon.

On 19 June 2018, after being a backup to Baptiste Reynet, Leroy signed with Ajaccio. He grew into a starter for the club, and in the 2019–20 season he was voted into the Ligue 2 Team of the Season by France Football. His strong performances continued, and in the 2021–22 season, he was also voted into the UNFP Ligue 2 Team of the Year.

== Career statistics ==
As of match played 10 May 2025

Appearances and goals by club, season and competition
Club	Season	League			National cup		League cup		Other		Total	
Club	Season	Division	Apps	Goals	Apps	Goals	Apps	Goals	Apps	Goals	Apps	Goals
Tours	2009–10	Ligue 2	0	0	0	0	0	0	—		0	0
Tours	2010–11	Ligue 2	1	0	0	0	0	0	—		1	0
Tours	2011–12	Ligue 2	37	0	0	0	2	0	—		39	0
Tours	2012–13	Ligue 2	38	0	0	0	2	0	—		40	0
Tours	2013–14	Ligue 2	32	0	0	0	3	0	—		35	0
Tours	Total		108	0	0	0	7	0	—		115	0
Evian B	2014–15	CFA 2	1	0	—		—		—		1	0
Evian	2014–15	Ligue 1	23	0	2	0	1	0	—		26	0
Evian	2015–16	Ligue 2	35	0	0	0	2	0	—		37	0
Evian	Total		58	0	2	0	3	0	—		63	0
Dijon	2016–17	Ligue 1	1	0	2	0	1	0	—		4	0
Dijon	2017–18	Ligue 1	0	0	1	0	1	0	—		2	0
Dijon	Total		1	0	3	0	2	0	—		6	0
Ajaccio	2018–19	Ligue 2	38	0	0	0	2	0	—		40	0
Ajaccio	2019–20	Ligue 2	28	0	0	0	2	0	—		30	0
Ajaccio	2020–21	Ligue 2	34	0	1	0	—		—		35	0
Ajaccio	2021–22	Ligue 2	32	0	0	0	—		—		32	0
Ajaccio	2022–23	Ligue 1	32	0	0	0	—		—		32	0
Ajaccio	Total		164	0	1	0	4	0	—		169	0
Quevilly-Rouen	2023–24	Ligue 2	36	0	1	0	—		—		37	0
Lorient	2024–25	Ligue 2	1	0	3	0	—		—		4	0
Lorient	2025–26	Ligue 1	0	0	0	0	—		—		0	0
Lorient	Total		1	0	3	0	—		—		4	0
Career total			369	0	10	0	16	0	0	0	395	0

== Honours ==
Lorient

- Ligue 2: 2024–25

Individual

- France Football Team of the Season: 2019–20
- UNFP Ligue 2 Team of the Year: 2021–22
