= 1993–94 Danish Superliga =

4th season of Danish Superliga

Danish Superliga
- Season: 1993-94
- Champions: Silkeborg IF
- Relegated: Viborg FF

The 1993–94 Danish Superliga season was the fourth season of the Danish Superliga league championship, governed by the Danish Football Association.

The tournament was held in two rounds. First round was in the autumn 1993, and the second in the spring 1994. The teams placed first to eighth in first round, played in second round. Their scores were reset to zero, and their mutual points were shorted to the half.

The two teams placed ninth and tenth in first round, played in the qualification league in the spring. They had respectively 8 and 7 points with.

The Danish champions qualified for the UEFA Champions League 1994-95 qualification, while the second and third placed teams qualified for the qualification round of the UEFA Cup 1994-95. The teams placed first and second in the qualification league promoted.

== Autumn 1993 ==
=== Table ===
Pos	Team	Pld	W	D	L	GF	GA	GD	Pts	Qualification or relegation
1	Silkeborg IF	18	9	7	2	34	20	+14	25	Qualification to Spring 1994 competition
2	Odense BK	18	9	6	3	27	16	+11	24	Qualification to Spring 1994 competition
3	FC København	18	10	2	6	32	22	+10	22	Qualification to Spring 1994 competition
4	Brøndby IF	18	7	6	5	32	24	+8	20	Qualification to Spring 1994 competition
5	Lyngby BK	18	5	10	3	19	23	−4	20	Qualification to Spring 1994 competition
6	Aalborg BK	18	4	9	5	28	25	+3	17	Qualification to Spring 1994 competition
7	Ikast FS	18	5	7	6	31	29	+2	17	Qualification to Spring 1994 competition
8	Aarhus GF	18	5	5	8	30	31	−1	15	Qualification to Spring 1994 competition
9	Næstved IF	18	3	4	11	28	46	−18	10	Qualification to Qualification League
10	Viborg FF	18	3	4	11	25	50	−25	10	Qualification to Qualification League

Rules for classification: 1) points; 2) goal difference; 3) number of goals scored.

=== Results ===
Home \ Away	AGF	BIF	FCK	IFS	LBK	NIF	OB	SIF	VFF	AAB
AGF		3–1	1–2	2–2	0–0	4–0	2–2	1–2	6–0	2–1
Brøndby IF	2–0		0–1	1–1	1–1	5–0	4–2	3–0	3–1	1–1
F.C. Copenhagen	2–0	3–1		0–3	0–1	0–0	0–1	1–2	4–1	2–0
Ikast FS	2–2	0–1	2–3		1–1	5–2	1–0	2–2	3–0	2–1
Lyngby BK	3–1	0–0	1–1	2–0		2–2	0–0	2–2	2–0	1–0
Næstved IF	3–2	1–2	2–4	3–2	8–2		0–2	1–1	1–2	2–3
OB	3–0	2–1	1–0	1–1	0–0	3–1		2–0	4–0	0–0
Silkeborg IF	0–0	4–2	4–1	3–1	3–0	0–0	3–0		1–0	2–2
Viborg FF	2–3	2–2	2–7	3–1	1–1	5–2	2–3	0–3		2–2
AaB	4–1	2–2	0–1	2–2	3–0	2–0	1–1	2–2	2–2	

== Spring 1994 ==
=== Table ===
Pos	Team	Pld	W	D	L	GF	GA	GD	Pts	Qualification or relegation
1	Silkeborg IF (C)	14	8	2	4	23	15	+8	31	Qualification to Champions League qualifying round
2	FC København	14	8	2	4	27	19	+8	29	Qualification to UEFA Cup preliminary round
3	Brøndby IF	14	6	5	3	21	14	+7	27	Qualification to Cup Winners' Cup first round
4	Odense BK	14	5	5	4	17	16	+1	27	Qualification to UEFA Cup preliminary round
5	Aalborg BK	14	4	6	4	18	19	−1	23	
6	Lyngby FC	14	5	1	8	17	21	−4	21	
7	Ikast FS	14	3	5	6	16	23	−7	20	
8	Aarhus GF	14	3	2	9	11	23	−12	16	

Rules for classification: 1) points; 2) goal difference; 3) number of goals scored.
(C) Champions

=== Results ===
Home \ Away	AGF	BIF	FCK	IFS	LFC	OB	SIF	AAB
AGF		0–2	0–1	2–4	0–1	2–1	0–3	1–1
Brøndby IF	2–1		1–0	2–2	2–1	0–0	2–2	1–1
F.C. Copenhagen	1–3	2–1		2–1	3–0	1–1	4–1	3–3
Ikast FS	0–1	1–1	0–2		2–2	0–0	0–3	1–4
Lyngby FC	4–1	2–1	0–3	1–2		2–0	4–1	0–1
OB	2–0	0–3	3–2	2–2	1–0		3–0	2–1
Silkeborg IF	1–0	1–0	5–0	0–1	2–0	1–0		2–0
AaB	0–0	1–3	0–3	1–0	2–0	2–2	1–1	

== Top goalscorers ==
Rank	Player	Club	Goals
1	(Denmark) Søren Frederiksen	Silkeborg IF	18
2	(Denmark) Ove Hansen	Ikast fS	16
3	(Denmark) Lars Højer Nielsen	FC København	13
3	(Denmark) Mark Strudal	Brøndby IF	13
5	(Denmark) Erik Bo Andersen	Aalborg BK	12
5	(Denmark) Heine Fernandez	Silkeborg IF	12
7	(Denmark) Søren Andersen	Aarhus GF	7
7	(Denmark) Søren Juel	Næstved IF	7
7	(Cameroon) Alphonse Tchami	Odense BK	7
7	(Denmark) Thomas Thøgersen	Brøndby IF	7
7	(Denmark) Martin Johansen	FC København	7

== Attendances ==
No.	Club	Average	Highest
1	FC København	8,019	26,679
2	Brøndby IF	7,152	14,642
3	Silkeborg IF	5,657	11,674
4	AaB	5,197	11,500
5	OB	4,862	10,716
6	AGF	4,500	8,300
7	Ikast fS	2,652	4,947
8	Lyngby BK	2,293	6,122
9	Viborg FF	2,292	6,670
10	Næstved BK	2,130	4,285

== See also ==
- 1993-94 in Danish football
