= Cédric Barbosa =

French footballer (born 1976)

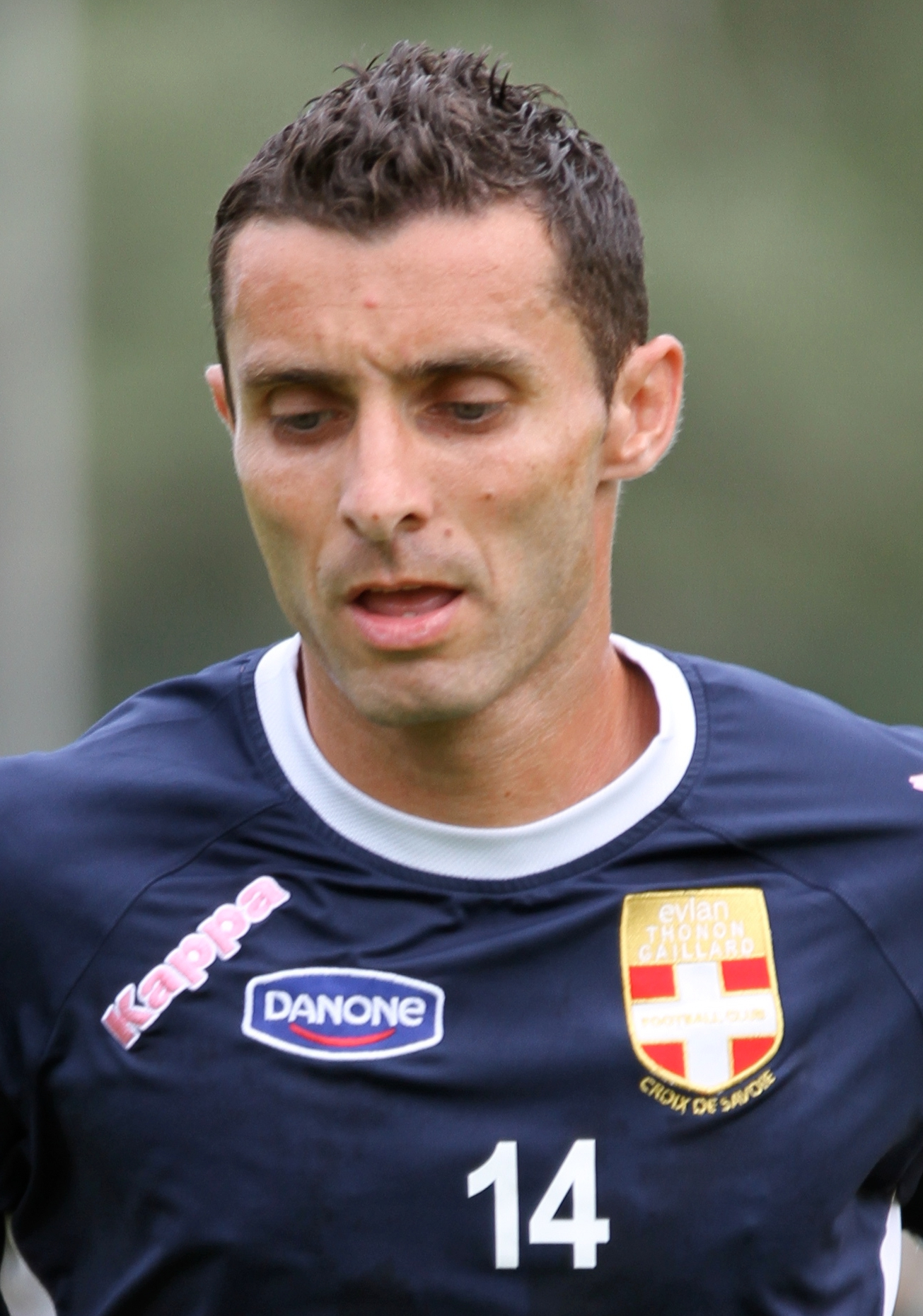

Personal information
- Full name: Cédric Barbosa
- Date of birth: 6 March 1976 (age 50)
- Place of birth: Aubenas, France
- Height: 1.79 m (5 ft 10 in)
- Position: Midfielder

Team information
- Current team: AS Rousson (manager); AS Saint-Privat (player)

Youth career
- 1992–1994: Olympique Alès

Senior career*
Years	Team	Apps	(Gls)
1994–1997	Alès	106	(3)
1997–2003	Montpellier	147	(12)
2003–2006	Stade Rennais	51	(2)
2006	Troyes	30	(2)
2007–2009	Metz	50	(4)
2009–2016	Evian	198	(32)
2016–2018	Annecy	32	(6)
2018–2019	Olympique Alès	0	(0)
2019–	AS Saint-Privat		

Managerial career
- 2020–: AS Rousson
- * Club domestic league appearances and goals as of 01:34, 27 July 2018 (UTC)

Cédric Barbosa (born 6 March 1976) is a French professional football player, who plays for AS Saint-Privat and is also the manager of AS Rousson.

== Career ==
Barbosa is a midfielder and lists Olympique Alès, Montpellier and Stade Rennais as his former clubs. On 30 July 2009 the Third division club Evian signed him from Metz on a free transfer.

In 2016, aged 40, Barbosa left Evian, but stated that he was still looking to play for at least another year. Barbosa then played two seasons with Annecy FC in the Championnat National 2 and one season with Olympique Alès in the Championnat National 3, before retiring. However, 44-year old Barbosa returned to the pitch in November 2019, signing with amateur club AS Saint-Privat to play together with his son, Antoine (born in 1999).

In February 2020, Barbosa was offered to become the manager of Avenir Sportif Roussonnais, better known as AS Rousson, which he accepted. Barbosa had known the club's sporting director, Mouss Guiza, for a while. He was still registered to play for AS Saint-Privat if the calendar allowed it.

== Honours ==
Montpellier

- UEFA Intertoto Cup: 1999
