= Zakariya Abarouai =

French–Moroccan footballer (born 1994)

Personal information
- Date of birth: 30 March 1994 (age 32)
- Place of birth: Lyon, France
- Height: 1.82 m (6 ft 0 in)
- Position: Striker

Team information
- Current team: Chassieu Décines

Youth career
- –2014: Evian

Senior career*
Years	Team	Apps	(Gls)
2013–2016	Evian B	52	(9)
2014–2016	Evian	7	(0)
2016	→ CA Bastia (loan)	5	(0)
2017	Vaulx-en-Velin		
2017–2019	Saint-Priest	19	(3)
2019–2020	Algérienne Villeurbanne		
2020–	Chassieu Décines	21	(5)
- * Club domestic league appearances and goals as of 7 December 2024

Zakariya Abarouai (born 30 March 1994) is a French–Moroccan footballer who plays for Championnat National 3 club Chassieu Décines. He plays as a striker.

== Club career ==
Abarouai made his Ligue 1 debut at 4 May 2014 against Stade de Reims in a 1–0 away defeat. He replaced Marco Ruben after 65 minutes at the Stade Auguste Delaune in Reims.

== Personal life ==
Abarouai holds both French and Moroccan nationalities.
