= Clarck Nsikulu =

Congolese footballer (born 1992)

Personal information
- Full name: Clarck Nsikulu Nsumbu
- Date of birth: 10 July 1992 (age 34)
- Place of birth: Lille, France
- Height: 1.80 m (5 ft 11 in)
- Positions: Left winger; forward

Youth career
- –2012: Lille
- 2012–2013: Évian

Senior career*
Years	Team	Apps	(Gls)
2011	Lille B	2	(0)
2012–2014	Évian B	22	(11)
2012–2016	Évian	62	(8)
2016–2017	Stade Lavallois	27	(1)
2017–2018	Platanias	29	(5)
2018–2021	Atromitos	66	(7)
2021–2022	Boulogne	30	(6)
2023–2024	Wasquehal	17	(7)
2024–2025	Beauvais	11	(3)
2025–2026	La Roche VF	30	(7)

International career^{‡}
2013	DR Congo U20	4	(0)
- * Club domestic league appearances and goals as of 16 May 2026 ‡ National team caps and goals as of 10 May 2014

Clarck Nsikulu Nsumbu (born 10 July 1992) is a professional footballer. Born in France, he represented DR Congo internationally.

== Club career ==
Born in Lille, France, Nsikulu joined Évian in January 2012 from Lille OSC. He made his Ligue 1 debut during the 2012–13 season. In his first season with Évian, he scored one goal out of six games. On 4 December 2013, he scored the opening goal in 2–0 home win over Paris Saint-Germain.

== International career ==
Nsikulu represented the DR Congo U20 at the 2013 Toulon Tournament.
