= Jacob Olesen =

Danish footballer (born 1981)

Personal information
- Date of birth: 1 February 1981 (age 45)
- Place of birth: Haderslev, Denmark
- Height: 1.90 m (6 ft 3 in)
- Position: Striker

Team information
- Current team: Viborg FF
- Number: 19

Youth career
- Haderslev FK

Senior career*
Years	Team	Apps	(Gls)
2000–2006	SønderjyskE	68	(45)
2006–present	Viborg FF	18	(8)
- * Club domestic league appearances and goals as of 24 September 2006

Jacob Olesen (born 1 February 1981) is a Danish football striker, who currently plays for the Danish Superliga side Viborg FF.

He came to Viborg FF from SønderjyskE in January 2006. In the first months of the 2006-07 Superliga season, Olesen was Viborg's top goal scorer with five goals, all on headers. He suffered a severe dislocation of the left ankle in an October 2006 game, and was out for 6 months.
