= List of Danish Superliga clubs =

The following is a list of clubs who have played in the Danish Superliga at any time since its formation in 1991 to the current season. Teams playing in the 2026–27 Danish Superliga season are indicated in bold. A total of 33 teams have played in the Danish Superliga.

Club	Town or City	Total seasons	Total spells	Last promotion	Last relegation	Seasons
Aalborg BK	Aalborg	34	2	2024–2025	2024–2025	
Aarhus Fremad	Aarhus	2	1	1997–1998	1998–1999	
**Aarhus GF**	Aarhus	34	4	2015–2016	2013–2014	
AB Copenhagen	Copenhagen, Gladsaxe	8	1	1996–1997	2003–2004	
**AC Horsens**	Horsens	14	4	2022–2023	2022–2023	
B 1903	Copenhagen	2	1	1985	Never relegated	
B 1909	Odense	1	1	1992–1993	1992–1993	
BK Frem	Copenhagen, Valby	4	2	2003–2004	2003–2004	
BK Fremad Amager	Copenhagen, Sundby	1	1	1994–1995	1994–1995	
Boldklubben 1893	Copenhagen	1	1	1998–1999	1998–1999	
**Brøndby IF**	Brøndby	37	1	1982	Never relegated	
Esbjerg fB	Esbjerg	18	4	2018–2019	2019–2020	
**F.C. Copenhagen**	Copenhagen	35	1	1985	Never relegated	
FC Fredericia	Fredericia	1	1	2025–2026	Never relegated	
FC Helsingør	Helsingør	1	1	2017–2018	2017–2018	
**FC Midtjylland**	Herning & Ikast	27	1	2000–2001	Never relegated	
**FC Nordsjælland**	Farum	25	1	2002–2003	Never relegated	
FC Vestsjælland	Slagelse	2	1	2013–2014	2014–2015	
HB Køge	Herfølge & Køge	2	2	2011–2012	2011–2012	
Herfølge BK	Herfølge	8	2	2003–2004	2004–2005	
Hobro IK	Hobro	5	2	2017–2018	2019–2020	
Hvidovre IF	Hvidovre	2	2	2023–2024	2023–2024	
Ikast fS	Ikast	5	3	1997–1998	1997–1998	
Køge BK	Køge	1	1	2002–2003	2002–2003	
**Lyngby BK**	Kongens Lyngby	23	6	2022–2023	2020–2021	
Næstved BK	Næstved	5	1	1991–1992	1995–1996	
**Odense BK**	Odense	35	3	2025–2026	1997–1998	
**Randers FC**	Randers	21	3	2012–2013	2010–2011	
**Silkeborg IF**	Silkeborg	30	7	2021–2022	2019–2020	
**SønderjyskE**	Haderslev	19	4	2008–2009	2021–2022	
Vejle BK	Vejle	16	8	2023–2024	2021–2022	
Vendsyssel FF	Hjørring	1	1	2018–2019	2018–2019	
**Viborg FF**	Viborg	21	6	2021–2022	2016–2017	
