= Cédric Cambon =

French footballer (born 1986)

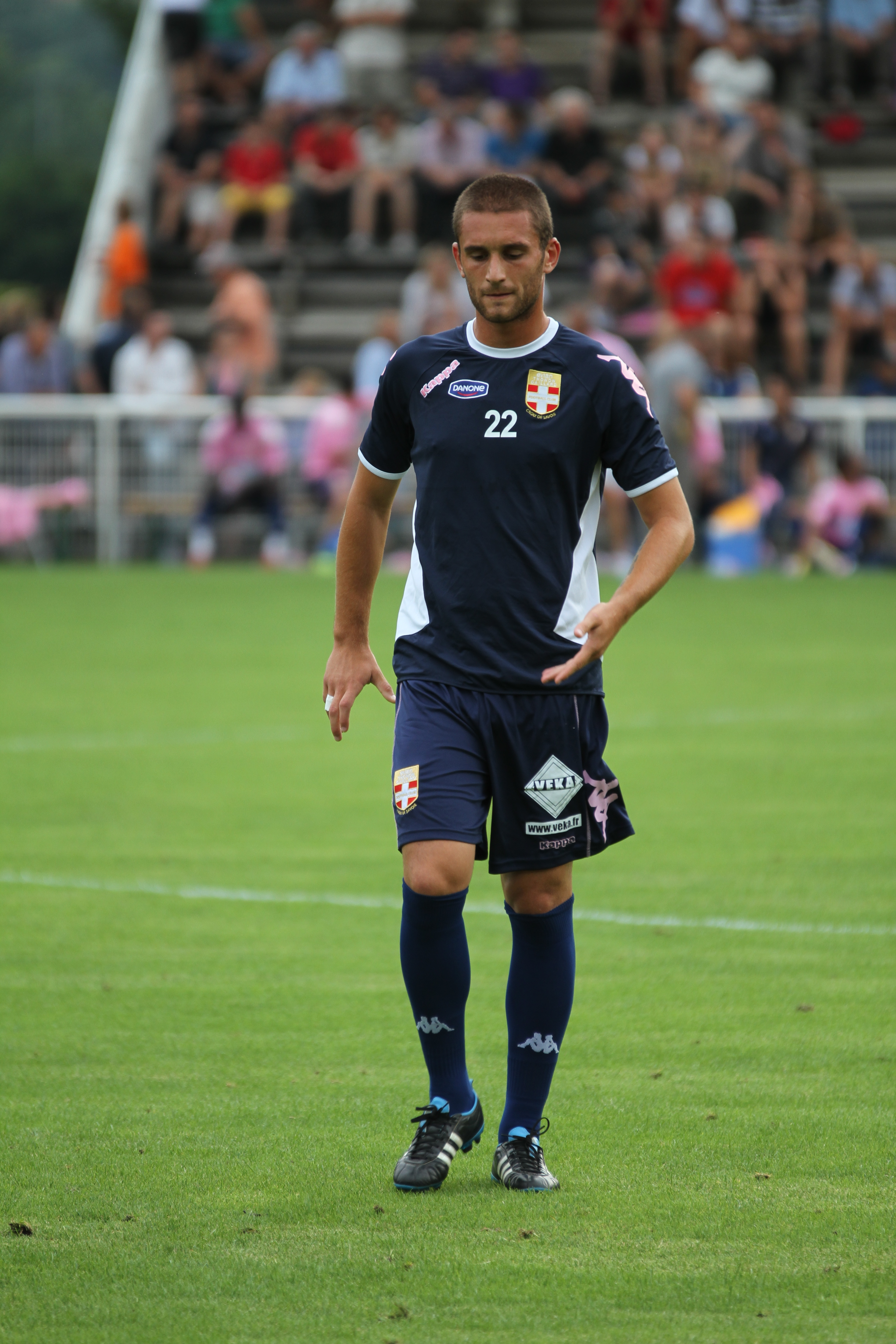

Personal information
- Date of birth: 20 September 1986 (age 40)
- Place of birth: Montpellier, France
- Height: 1.84 m (6 ft 0 in)
- Position: Defender

Youth career
- 1997–2005: Montpellier

Senior career*
Years	Team	Apps	(Gls)
2004–2007	Montpellier	26	(0)
2007–2009	Litex Lovech	22	(0)
2009–2015	Evian	159	(8)
2015–2017	Le Havre	63	(1)
2017–2020	Orléans	80	(4)

International career^{‡}
2003–2005	France U19	20	(1)
- * Club domestic league appearances and goals ‡ National team caps and goals as of 1 August 2007

Cédric Cambon (born 20 September 1986) is a retired former French professional footballer who last played for US Orléans as a defender.

== Club career ==
Born in Montpellier, Cambon started playing football as a youth in Cournonterral, where he was noticed by scouts from Montpellier HSC in 1995. He started playing for the professional team in 2003. In 2007 he signed with Litex Lovech, he returned to France in January 2009 and signed with Thonon Évian F.C.

On 9 July 2015, Cambon signed a three-year contract with Le Havre. In his debut with Havre, on 31 July 2015, he scored his first goal for the club in a 3–1 away win.

On 24 July 2017, Cambon signed with Orléans on a two-year contract.

Cambon announced his retirement from football in June 2020, having been released by Orléans at the end of the 2019–20 season.

== International career ==
In 2005 Cambon became European champion with the France U19 team.

== Honours ==
Litex Lovech

- Bulgarian Cup: 2008

Évian

- Ligue 2: 2010–11
