= High press =

Association football team playstyle

High press or high pressing is a style of play in association football in which a team keeps its defenders forward to increase pressure near the opposing goal. It was pioneered in the 1970s by AFC Ajax under managers Rinus Michels and Stefan Kovacs. They were successful and, in the 21st century, the system has been adopted by most top teams.

The tactic may be used with man-to-man marking, zonal defense or hybrid systems.
