= Søren Frederiksen (footballer, born 1972) =

Danish footballer (born 1972)

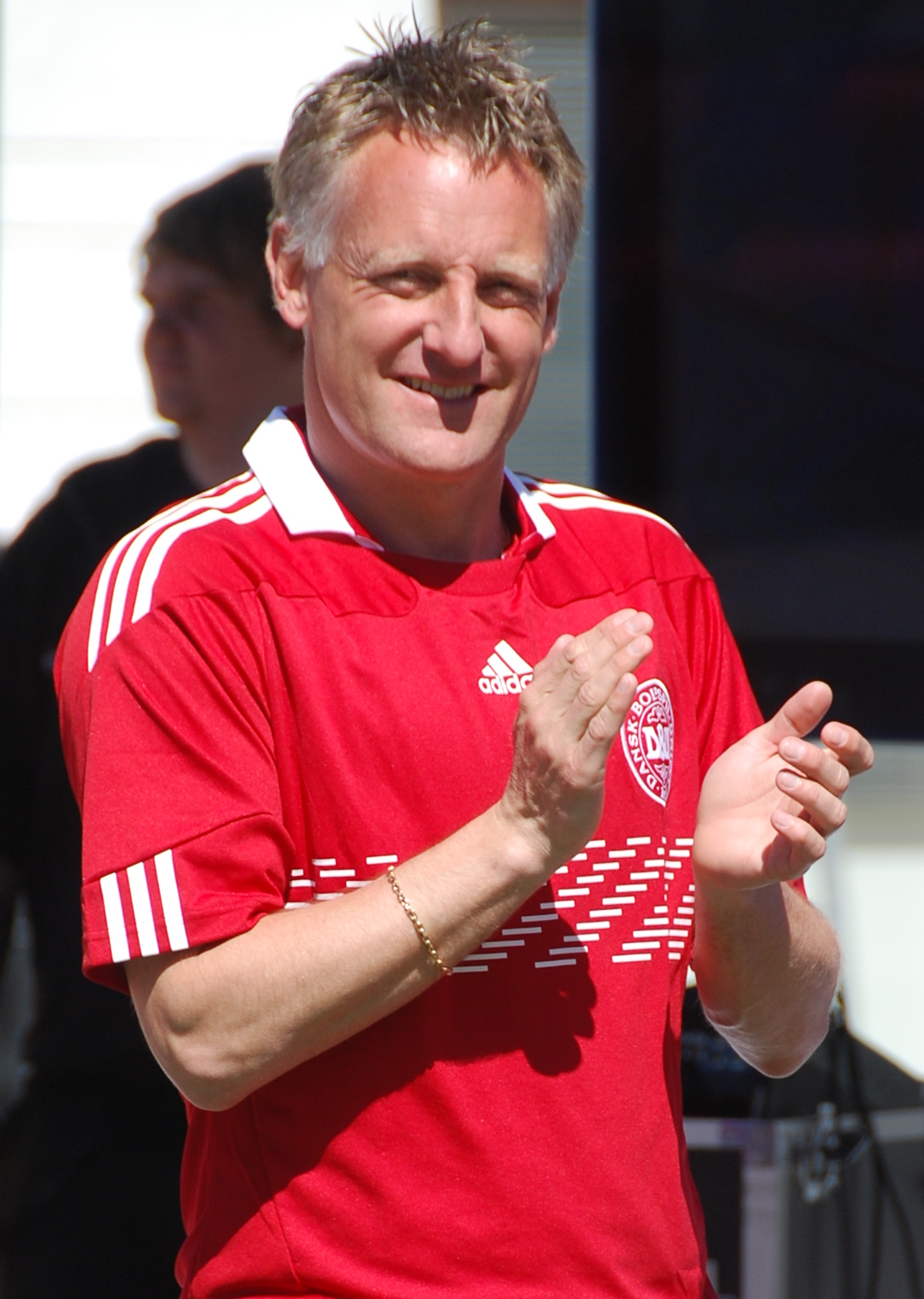
- Frederiksen in 2011

Personal information
- Full name: Søren Frederiksen
- Date of birth: 26 November 1972 (age 53)
- Place of birth: Frederikshavn, Denmark
- Height: 1.80 m (5 ft 11 in)
- Position: Forward

Youth career
- Frederikshavn

Senior career*
Years	Team	Apps	(Gls)
1989–1994	Viborg	?	(?)
1994–1995	Silkeborg	12	(2)
1995–1996	Viborg	77	(27)
1997–2000	AaB	122	(53)
1998	→ Viborg (loan)	?	(?)
2000–2005	Viborg	110	(52)
Total		321	(134)

International career
1991–1992	Denmark U19	4	(0)
1993	Denmark U21	6	(1)
1994–1999	Denmark	6	(1)

Managerial career
- 2005–2007: Skive
- 2008–2009: Viborg (assistant)
- 2009: Viborg (caretaker)
- 2009–2011: Viborg (assistant)
- 2011: Viborg (assistant)
- 2012–2016: Viborg (assistant)
- * Club domestic league appearances and goals

Søren Frederiksen (born 27 January 1972) is a Danish former footballer who played as a forward. He scored 134 goals in the Danish Superliga championship, putting him second in the list of all-time topscorers. He played six games and scored one goal for the Denmark national team.

== Playing career ==
Frederiksen started his career in Frederikshavn fI, before moving to Viborg FF in 1989. He started on the 2nd team, but was quickly promoted to the first team. He was an immediate success, when in his debut he scored a hattrick against KB, and later he went on to become the top scorer of the Highest Danish League in 1993–1994 with 18 goals in 32 matches. He moved on to Silkeborg IF, and helped the club win the 1994 Superliga championship. As a result of the lack of playing time, he went back to Viborg in the following season. He then moved to league rivals Aalborg BK, and helped them win the 1999 Superliga title. In 2001, he moved back to Viborg. From 2003, he suffered a string of Achilles tendon injuries, and ended his career in 2005 at the age of 33. At his retirement, the #22 shirt was retired by Viborg FF.

== Coaching and scouting career ==
He went on to become head coach for Skive IK and later on assistant coach for Viborg FF. When Hans Eklund was fired in April 2009, Frederiksen was promoted to head coach. After the season, he stepped down to become assistant for new manager Lars Søndergaard.

In September 2017, Frederiksen was appointed as scout for Dutch Eredivisie club SC Heerenveen.

== Honours ==
Silkeborg

- Danish Superliga: 1993–94
