= Danish Superliga =

Danish football league

Superliga
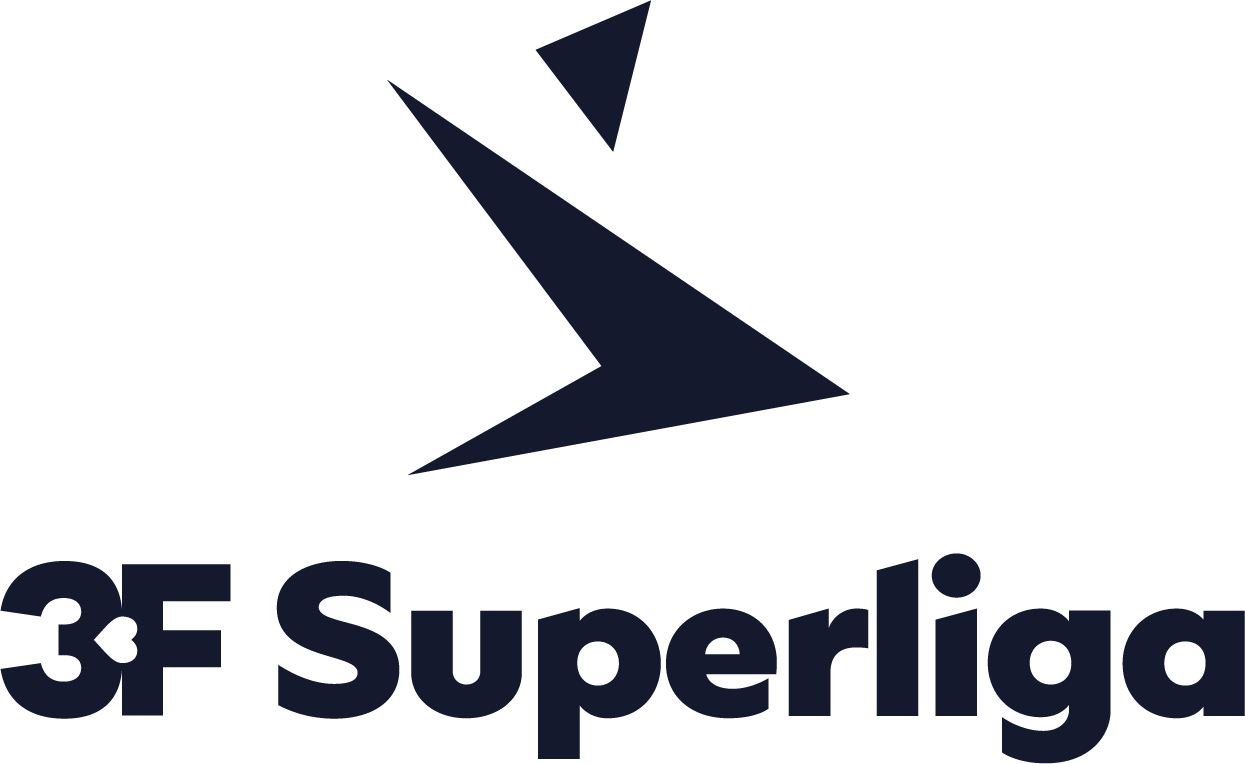
- Organising body: Divisionsforeningen
- Founded: 1991
- First season: 1991
- Country: Denmark
- Confederation: UEFA
- Number of clubs: 12
- Level on pyramid: 1
- Relegation to: Danish 1st Division
- Domestic cup: Danish Cup
- International cup(s): UEFA Champions League; UEFA Europa League; UEFA Conference League
- Current champions: AGF (1st title) (2025–26)
- Most championships: Copenhagen (16 titles)
- Most appearances: Rasmus Würtz (452)
- Top scorer: Morten Rasmussen (145)
- Broadcaster(s): Domestic; Viaplay Group (TV3+, TV3 Sport); TV2 (TV2 Sport X, TV2 Sport); International; Eleven Sports; OneFootball
- Website: superliga.dk; divisionsforeningen.dk
- Current: 2026–27 Danish Superliga

The Danish Superliga (Danish: Superligaen, pronounced [ˈsuˀpɐliːˌkɛˀn̩]) is a professional association football league in Denmark and the highest level of the Danish football league system. The league is currently contested by 12 teams each year, with 2 teams relegated. It is the current Danish football championship tournament, and administered by the Divisionsforeningen.

== History ==
Founded in 1991, the Danish Superliga replaced the Danish 1st Division as the highest league of football in Denmark. From the start in 1991, 10 teams were participating. The opening Superliga season was played during the spring of 1991, with the ten teams playing each other twice for the championship title. From the summer of 1991, the tournament structure would stretch over two calendar years. The 10 teams would play each other twice in the first half of the tournament. In the following spring, the bottom two teams would be cut off, the points of the teams would be cut in half, and the remaining eight teams would once more play each other twice, for a total of 32 games in a season.

This practice was abandoned before the 1995–96 season, when the number of teams competing was increased to 12, playing each other thrice for 33 games per Superliga season. For the first season of this new structure, Coca-Cola became the name sponsor of the league, which was then named Coca-Cola Ligaen. After a single season under that name, Faxe Brewery became sponsors and the league changed its name to Faxe Kondi Ligaen. Before the 2001–02 season, Scandinavian Airlines System (SAS) became the head sponsor, and the name of the tournament changed to SAS Ligaen. From January 2015 the Danish Superliga would be known as Alka Superliga, as the Danish insurance company Alka became name sponsor.

Logos used for naming rights agreements for the league:

Coca-Cola Ligaen
(1995–96)
Sponsor: Coca-Cola

Faxe Kondi Ligaen
(1996–97 until 2000–01)
Sponsor: Faxe Brewery

SAS Ligaen
(2001–02 until 2009–10)
Sponsor: SAS

Superligaen
(2010–11 until 31 Dec 2014)
No league sponsor

Alka Superliga
(1 Jan 2015 until 2017–18)
Sponsor: Alka

Superligaen
2018–19
No league sponsor

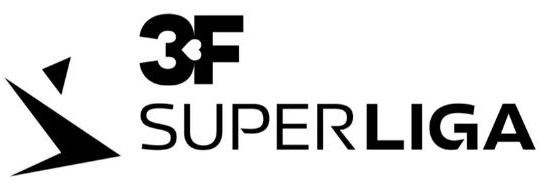
3F Superliga
(Since 2019–20)
Sponsor: United Federation of Danish Workers

== Structure ==
From 1996 through 2016, the league included 12 clubs which played each other three times. The two teams with the fewest points at the end of the season were relegated to the Danish 1st Division and replaced by the top two teams of that division. During this era, each team played every other team at least once at home and once away plus once more either at home or away. The top six teams of the previous season played 17 matches at home and 16 away while the teams in 7th to 10th place plus the two newly promoted teams played 16 matches at home and 17 away.

Following the 2015–16 season, the league was expanded to 14 teams, accomplished by relegating only the last-place finisher in that season and promoting the top three teams from the 1st division. The 2016–17 season was the first for the new league structure. It began with the teams playing a full home-and-away schedule, resulting in 26 matches for each team. At that time, the league split into a six-team championship playoff and an eight-team qualifying playoff. All teams' table points and goals carry over fully into the playoffs.

In the championship playoff, each team plays the others home and away again. The top team at the end of the playoff is Superliga champion and enters the Champions League in the second qualifying round. The second-place team enters the Europa League in the first qualifying round. The third-place team advances to a one-off playoff match for another Europa League place. If the winner of the Danish Cup finishes in the top three, the match will instead involve the fourth-place team.

The qualifying playoff is split into two groups, with the teams that finished the regular season in 7th, 10th, 11th and 14th in one group and those finishing 8th, 9th, 12th and 13th in the other. Each group plays home-and-away within its group. The top two teams from each group then enter a knockout tournament, with each match over two legs. If the Danish Cup winner is among the top two finishers in either playoff group, it is withdrawn from the knockout playoff and its opponent automatically advances to the tournament final. The winner of that tournament faces the third-place (or fourth-place) team from the championship playoff in a one-off match, with the winner entering the Europa League in the first qualifying round.

The bottom two teams from each group then contest a relegation playoff with several steps, centered on a separate four-team knockout playoff, also consisting totally of two-legged matches:

- The third-placed teams in each group play over two legs, with the winners remaining in the Superliga and the losers advancing to a playoff final against the third-place team from the 1st Division.
- The bottom teams in each group play over two legs, with the winners advancing to a play-off final against the second-place team from the 1st Division, and the losers dropping to next season's 1st Division.
- The winners of each play-off final play in the next season's Superliga.

In the 2019–20 season, the number of teams was reduced from 14 to 12 teams. It began with all 12 teams playing a full home-and-away schedule, resulting in 22 matches for each team. At that time, the league split into a six-team championship playoff and a six-team qualifying playoff. All teams' points and goals carried over fully from the regular season into the playoffs. In both playoff groups, six teams play a full home-and-away schedule, resulting in ten matches (32 for the full season). The two bottom teams in the qualifying playoff are relegated to 1st Division, while the team finishing 7th plays against the lowest placed team from the Championship playoff, who failed to qualify directly to European Football, in a single match, to decide the final European spot from Denmark.

== Teams ==
=== Current teams (2026–27) ===
Locations of the Danish Superliga 2026–27 teams

Club	2025–26 Position	First season in top division	First season of current spell in top division
AGF	1st	1918–19	2015–16
Brøndby	4th	1982	1982
Copenhagen	7th	1992–93	1992–93
Horsens	2nd in 1st Division	2005–06	2026–27
Lyngby	1st in 1st Division	1980	2026–27
Midtjylland	2nd	2000–01	2000–01
Nordsjælland	3rd	2002–03	2002–03
OB	8th	1927–28	2025–26
Randers	10th	2004–05	2011–12
Silkeborg	9th	1988	2021–22
Sønderjyske	6th	2001–02	2024–25
Viborg	5th	1981	2021–22

== Seasons ==
Season	Champions	Performance							
Season	Champions	Pts	Pld	W	D	L	GF	GA	GD
1991	Brøndby	26	18	10	6	2	26	15	+11
1991–92	Lyngby	32	14	9	2	3	22	7	+15
1992–93	Copenhagen	32	14	8	3	3	31	23	+8
1993–94	Silkeborg	31	14	8	2	4	23	15	+8
1994–95	AaB	31	14	7	4	3	30	13	+17
1995–96	Brøndby	67	33	20	7	6	71	32	+39
1996–97	Brøndby	68	33	20	8	5	64	39	+25
1997–98	Brøndby	76	33	24	4	5	81	33	+48
1998–99	AaB	64	33	17	13	3	65	37	+28
1999–2000	Herfølge	56	33	16	8	9	52	49	+3
2000–01	Copenhagen	63	33	17	12	4	55	27	+28
2001–02	Brøndby	69	33	20	9	4	74	28	+46
2002–03	Copenhagen	61	33	17	10	6	51	32	+19
2003–04	Copenhagen	68	33	20	8	5	56	27	+29
2004–05	Brøndby	69	33	20	9	4	61	23	+38
2005–06	Copenhagen	73	33	22	7	4	62	27	+35
2006–07	Copenhagen	76	33	23	7	3	60	23	+37
2007–08	AaB	71	33	22	5	6	60	38	+22
2008–09	Copenhagen	74	33	23	5	5	67	26	+41
2009–10	Copenhagen	68	33	21	5	7	61	22	+39
2010–11	Copenhagen	81	33	25	6	2	77	29	+48
2011–12	Nordsjælland	68	33	21	5	7	49	22	+27
2012–13	Copenhagen	65	33	18	11	4	62	32	+30
2013–14	AaB	62	33	18	8	7	60	38	+22
2014–15	Midtjylland	71	33	22	5	6	64	34	+30
2015–16	Copenhagen	71	33	21	8	4	62	28	+34
2016–17	Copenhagen	84	36	25	9	2	74	20	+54
2017–18	Midtjylland	85	36	27	4	5	80	39	+41
2018–19	Copenhagen	82	36	26	4	6	86	37	+49
2019–20	Midtjylland	82	36	26	4	6	61	29	+32
2020–21	Brøndby	61	32	19	4	9	58	38	+20
2021–22	Copenhagen	68	32	20	8	4	56	19	+37
2022–23	Copenhagen	59	32	18	5	9	61	35	+26
2023–24	Midtjylland	63	32	19	6	7	62	43	+19
2024–25	Copenhagen	63	32	18	9	5	60	33	+27
2025–26	AGF	67	32	19	10	3	62	32	+30

=== Relegations ===
Season	Relegated team(s)
1991	Ikast
1991–92	Vejle
1992–93	Frem, B 1909
1993–94	Viborg, B93
1994–95	Fremad Amager
1995–96	Ikast, Næstved
1996–97	Viborg, Hvidovre
1997–98	Ikast, OB
1998–99	Aarhus Fremad, B93
1999–00	Vejle, Esbjerg
2000–01	Herfølge, SønderjyskE
2001–02	Vejle, Lyngby
2002–03	Silkeborg, Køge
2003–04	Frem, AB
2004–05	Herfølge, Randers
2005–06	SønderjyskE, AGF
2006–07	Vejle, Silkeborg
2007–08	Viborg, Lyngby Boldklub
2008–09	Horsens, Vejle
2009–10	AGF, Køge
2010–11	Randers, Esbjerg
2011–12	Lyngby Boldklub, Køge
2012–13	Horsens, Silkeborg
2013–14	AGF, Viborg
2014–15	Vestsjælland, Silkeborg
2015–16	Hobro
2016–17	Viborg, Esbjerg
2017–18	Lyngby, Silkeborg, Helsingør
2018–19	Vendsyssel, Vejle
2019–20	Hobro, Silkeborg, Esbjerg
2020–21	Horsens, Lyngby
2021–22	Vejle, SønderjyskE
2022–23	Horsens, AaB
2023–24	Hvidovre, OB
2024–25	Lyngby, AaB
2025–26	Fredericia, Vejle

== Notable players ==
=== Top goalscorers ===
Season	Tally	Top scorer(s)
1991	11	Bent Christensen (Brøndby)
1991–92	17	Peter Møller (AaB)
1992–93	22	Peter Møller (AaB)
1993–94	18	Søren Frederiksen (Viborg)
1994–95	24	Erik Bo Andersen (AaB)
1995–96	20	Thomas Thorninger (AGF)
1996–97	26	Miklos Molnar (Lyngby)
1997–98	28	Ebbe Sand (Brøndby)
1998–99	23	Heine Fernandez (Viborg)
1999–00	16	Peter Lassen (Silkeborg)
2000–01	21	Peter Graulund (Brøndby)
2001–02	22	Peter Madsen (Brøndby) and Kaspar Dalgas (OB)
2002–03	18	Søren Frederiksen (Viborg) and Jan Kristiansen (Esbjerg)
2003–04	19	Steffen Højer and (Zambia) Mwape Miti (both OB), (Egypt) Mohamed Zidan (Midtjylland) and Tommy Bechmann (Esbjerg)
2004–05	20	Steffen Højer (OB)
2005–06	16	Steffen Højer (Viborg)
2006–07	19	(Sweden) Rade Prica (AaB)
2007–08	17	Jeppe Curth (AaB)
2008–09	16	Morten Nordstrand (Copenhagen) and Marc Nygaard (Randers)
2009–10	18	(Nigeria) Peter Utaka (OB)
2010–11	25	(Senegal) Dame N'Doye (Copenhagen)
2011–12	18	(Senegal) Dame N'Doye (Copenhagen)
2012–13	18	Andreas Cornelius (Copenhagen)
2013–14	18	Thomas Dalgaard (Viborg)
2014–15	17	(Austria) Martin Pusic (Esbjerg/ Midtjylland)
2015–16	18	(Lithuania) Lukas Spalvis (AaB)
2016–17	23	Marcus Ingvartsen (Nordsjælland)
2017–18	22	(Norway) Pål Alexander Kirkevold (Hobro)
2018–19	29	Robert Skov (Copenhagen)
2019–20	18	(Germany) Ronnie Schwartz (Silkeborg/Midtjylland)
2020–21	19	Mikael Uhre (Brøndby)
2021–22	17	Nicklas Helenius (Silkeborg)
2022–23	15	Patrick Mortensen (AGF) and Gustav Isaksen (Midtjylland)
2023–24	15	(Russia) German Onugkha (Vejle)
2024–25	20	Patrick Mortensen (AGF)
2025–26	17	(Guinea-Bissau) Franculino Djú (Midtjylland)

=== All-Time top scorer(s) ===
As of the end of the 2025–26 season

Rank	Player	Goals	Club(s)
1	(Denmark) Morten Rasmussen	142	AaB, AGF, Brøndby, Midtjylland
2	(Denmark) Søren Frederiksen	139	AaB, Silkeborg, Viborg
3	(Denmark) Peter Møller	135	AaB, Brøndby, Copenhagen
4	(Denmark) Heine Fernandez	125	AB, Copenhagen, Silkeborg, Viborg
5	(Denmark) Steffen Højer	124	AaB, OB, Viborg
6	(Denmark) **Patrick Mortensen**	113	AGF, Brøndby, Lyngby
7	(Denmark) Frank Kristensen	108	Ikast, Midtjylland, Randers
8	(Denmark) Peter Graulund	107	AGF, Brøndby, Vejle
9	(Denmark) Søren Andersen	101	AaB, AGF, OB
10	(Denmark) Nicklas Helenius	96	AaB, AGF, Silkeborg, OB
**Bold** denotes players still playing in the Superliga.

=== Most capped players ===
As of the end of the 2025–26 season

Rank	Player	Appearances	Club(s)
1	(Denmark) Rasmus Würtz	452	AaB, Copenhagen, Vejle
2	(Denmark) **Jesper Hansen**	444	AGF, Lyngby, Midtjylland, Nordsjælland
3	(Denmark) Nicolai Larsen	419	AaB, Nordsjælland, Silkeborg, Vejle
4	(Denmark) **Rasmus Falk**	410	Copenhagen, OB
5	(Denmark) Hans Henrik Andreasen	397	Esbjerg, Hobro, OB
6	(Denmark) Per Nielsen	394	Brøndby
7	(Denmark) Jakob Poulsen	390	AGF, Esbjerg, Midtjylland
8	(Denmark) Jimmy Nielsen	374	AaB, Vejle
9	(Denmark) Mogens Krogh	370	Ikfast, Brøndby
9	(Denmark) Nicolai Stokholm	370	AB, OB, Nordsjælland
**Bold** denotes players still playing in the Superliga. Italics denotes players still active in professional football.

=== Most capped foreign players ===
As of the end of the 2025–26 season

Rank	Player	Appearances	Club(s)
1	(Poland) Arkadiusz Onyszko	363	Midtjylland, OB, Viborg
2	(Philippines) Jerry Lucena	334	AGF, Esbjerg
3	(Morocco) Karim Zaza	322	AaB, Brøndby, Copenhagen, OB
4	(Nigeria) Rilwan Hassan	296	Midtjylland, Sønderjyske
5	(Faroe Islands) Todi Jónsson	243	Copenhagen, Lyngby
6	(Sweden) Pierre Bengtsson	242	Copenhagen, Nordsjælland, Vejle
7	(Zambia) Andrew Tembo	218	OB
8	(Germany) Kolja Afriyie	212	Esbjerg, Midtjylland
9	(Germany) Björn Kopplin	208	Brøndby, Hobro, Randers
10	(Nigeria) Izunna Uzochukwu	201	Midtjylland, OB

== Attendances ==
Season	Average	Total	Max	Min
1991	3,937	354,348	13,935	712
1991–92	4,428	646,510	16,500	1,014
1992–93	5,023	733,299	22,862	484
1993–94	4,739	691,855	26,679	475
1994–95	5,930	865,755	36,623	487
1995–96	5,689	1,126,414	39,640	704
1996–97	5,318	1,052,922	28,491	585
1997–98	5,519	1,092,688	33,124	939
1998–99	4,974	984,874	37,940	180
1999–2000	5,838	1,155,917	28,818	1,493
2000–01	5,837	1,155,662	40,281	1,003
2001–02	5,727	1,133,920	40,186	314
2002–03	7,307	1,446,752	40,254	800
2003–04	7,980	1,580,011	41,005	1,011
2004–05	8,589	1,700,532	40,654	843
2005–06	7,957	1,575,399	41,201	1,307
2006–07	8,108	1,605,367	40,463	1,799
2007–08	8,499	1,682,791	32,153	1,035
2008–09	8,815	1,745,308	32,856	1,609
2009–10	8,315	1,646,405	30,191	707
2010–11	7,049	1,395,616	28,387	1,017
2011–12	7,103	1,406,462	25,651	1,059
2012–13	6,760	1,338,465	33,215	0 (Note: Brøndby IF got a two matches ban on spectators due to unrest at a cup game against FC København.)
2013–14	7,929	1,570,027	32,846	1,656
2014–15	6,932	1,372,511	32,526	1,201
2015–16	7,253	1,436,188	29,178	1,327
2016–17	6,002	1,500,380	26,686	1,044
2017–18	5,880	1,469,980	28,410	568
2018–19	6,581	1,618,965	33,134	1,012
2019–20	4,764	1,152,832	29,310	0 (Note: Due to the COVID-19 pandemic some games were played without spectators and some games were played with a reduced amount allowed.)
2020–21	1,193	229,136	10,966	0 (Note: Due to the COVID-19 pandemic some games were played without spectators and some games were played with a reduced amount allowed.)
2021–22	8,636	1,658,078	35,463	1,702
2022–23	10,289	1,975,454	35,820	2,507
2023–24	10,173	1,993,472	34,917	1,530
2024–25	10,000	1,929,979	35,972	3,075
2025–26	9,285	1,792,068	34,442	1,771

== See also ==
- List of Danish Superliga clubs
- Sports league attendances
