= 2004–05 Danish Superliga =

15th season of Danish Superliga

SAS Ligaen
- Season: 2004–05
- Champions: Brøndby IF
- Relegated: Herfølge BK; Randers FC

The 2004–05 Danish Superliga season was the 15th season of the Danish Superliga league championship, governed by the Danish Football Association. It took place from 24 July 2004 to 19 June 2005.

The Danish champions qualified for 2005–06 UEFA Champions League qualifying rounds and the 2005–06 Royal League. The runners-up qualified for 2005–06 UEFA Cup qualifying rounds and Royal League, while the 3rd and 4th placed teams qualified for Royal League. The 11th and 12th-placed teams were relegated to the 1st Division. The 1st Division champions and runners-up were promoted to the Superliga.

== Table ==
Pos	Team	Pld	W	D	L	GF	GA	GD	Pts	Qualification or relegation
1	Brøndby (C)	33	20	9	4	61	23	+38	69	Qualification to Champions League second qualifying round and Royal League
2	Copenhagen	33	16	9	8	53	39	+14	57	Qualification to UEFA Cup second qualifying round and Royal League
3	Midtjylland	33	17	6	10	49	40	+9	57	Qualification to UEFA Cup second qualifying round and Royal League
4	AaB	33	15	8	10	59	45	+14	53	Qualification to Royal League
5	Esbjerg fB	33	13	10	10	61	47	+14	49	Qualification to UEFA Cup first qualifying round (Note: Esbjerg fB qualified for UEFA Cup first qualifying round via UEFA Fair Play ranking.)
6	OB	33	13	9	11	61	41	+20	48	
7	Viborg FF	33	13	9	11	43	45	−2	48	
8	Silkeborg IF	33	13	8	12	50	52	−2	47	
9	AGF	33	11	6	16	47	53	−6	39	
10	Nordsjælland	33	8	6	19	36	59	−23	30	
11	Herfølge Boldklub (R)	33	6	7	20	29	71	−42	25	Relegation to Danish 1st Division
12	Randers (R)	33	5	9	19	30	64	−34	24	Relegation to Danish 1st Division

Rules for classification: 1) points; 2) goal difference; 3) number of goals scored.
(C) Champions; (R) Relegated

== Results ==
Home \ Away	AGF	BIF	EFB	FCK	FCM	FCN	HBK	OB	RFC	SIF	VFF	AAB	AGF	BIF	EFB	FCK	FCM	FCN	HBK	OB	RFC	SIF	VFF	AAB
AGF		0–0	0–1	1–2	3–1	2–1	2–0	3–3	4–0	1–3	1–2	2–1		1–2			2–2		2–1				1–2	2–2
Brøndby IF	4–0		4–0	5–0	2–1	0–0	7–0	1–2	2–0	1–0	2–0	1–1					0–1	2–0		2–1	2–0	0–0	1–0	
Esbjerg fB	1–2	2–2		1–1	3–0	3–1	7–2	2–4	1–0	4–0	4–1	1–0	3–1	0–0			0–0		5–1	3–2				2–3
FC Copenhagen	2–1	1–3	2–2		4–0	2–0	2–0	1–1	4–0	0–1	0–0	3–2	2–3	3–0	1–0				1–1	1–1				4–0
FC Midtjylland	0–1	3–1	4–3	2–0		1–1	1–0	2–1	3–1	2–1	1–1	4–1				1–0		2–0		0–0	2–1	0–0	1–2	
FC Nordsjælland	2–2	0–1	2–1	1–2	3–2		0–0	0–0	2–2	2–3	3–2	0–1	2–1		2–3	2–3					2–0	2–3		
Herfølge BK	1–0	1–4	1–1	0–1	0–1	0–2		2–3	3–2	1–1	0–0	2–1		1–2			1–3	1–0					1–1	2–4
Odense BK	0–2	1–1	0–1	1–2	3–1	4–0	5–0		5–1	3–0	0–2	1–3	3–0					7–1	2–0		1–0		0–0	1–2
Randers FC	0–3	0–2	1–1	0–0	0–3	2–1	0–1	1–1		4–3	2–2	0–4	1–0		2–2	0–1			1–1			4–0		
Silkeborg IF	3–1	0–1	2–1	2–2	0–1	2–1	2–4	1–2	2–2		3–2	1–0	1–1		2–1	4–1			3–0	4–2				
Viborg FF	2–1	0–2	2–0	3–2	2–1	0–1	2–1	1–0	0–1	1–1		2–1			2–2	0–2		1–2			2–1	1–1		
AaB	3–1	1–1	0–0	1–1	1–2	2–0	3–0	1–1	3–0	1–0	1–2			3–3			2–1	2–0			1–1	3–1	5–3	

Source: Danskfodbold.com

== Top goal scorers ==
Rank	Player	Club	Goals
1	(Denmark) Steffen Højer	OB	20
2	(Sweden) Fredrik Berglund	Esbjerg fB	19
3	(Zambia) Mwape Miti	OB	17
4	(Brazil) José Mota	Viborg FF	14
5	(Denmark) Thomas Kahlenberg	Brøndby IF	13
5	(Denmark) Tommy Olsen	FC Nordsjælland	13
7	(Denmark) Simon Bræmer	AaB	12
7	(Denmark) Mads Junker	FC Nordsjælland	12
9	(Denmark) Poul Hübertz	Herfølge BK	11
9	(Egypt) Mohamed Zidan	FC Midtjylland	11
9	(Denmark) Kim Olsen	Silkeborg IF	11
9	(Denmark) Jan Kristiansen	Esbjerg fB	11
9	(Denmark) Morten Skoubo	Brøndby IF	11

== Attendances ==
No.	Club	Average	Highest
1	FC København	21,543	40,654
2	Brøndby IF	18,204	27,356
3	AGF	10,317	14,274
4	FC Midtjylland	8,957	11,738
5	AaB	8,004	14,025
6	Esbjerg fB	7,920	12,219
7	OB	6,830	13,676
8	Randers FC	5,174	8,628
9	Viborg FF	5,152	9,215
10	Silkeborg IF	4,692	8,255
11	FC Nordsjælland	2,968	6,766
12	Herfølge BK	2,062	5,400

== See also ==
- 2004-05 in Danish football
