= 2010–11 F.C. Copenhagen season =

København
2010–11 season
- Chairman: Hans Munk Nielsen
- Manager: Ståle Solbakken
- Danish Superliga: Winners
- Danish Cup: Third round
- UEFA Champions League: Round of 16
- Top goalscorer: League: Dame N'Doye (25); All: Dame N'Doye (28)
- Highest home attendance: 37,049 (vs Barcelona, 2 November 2010)
- Lowest home attendance: 6,049 (vs Horsens, 27 October 2010)
- Average home league attendance: 20,282
| Home colours | Away colours |

This article shows 2010–11 statistics of individual players for the football club F.C. Copenhagen. It also lists all matches that F.C. Copenhagen played in the 2010–11 season.

== Players ==
=== Squad information ===
This section show the squad as currently, considering all players who are confirmedly moved in and out (see section Players in / out).

| N | Pos. | Nat. | Name | Age | EU | Since | App | Goals | Ends | Transfer fee | Notes |
|---|---|---|---|---|---|---|---|---|---|---|---|
| 1 | GK | (Denmark) | K. Christensen | 30 | EU | 2010 | 3 | 0 | 2013 | Undisclosed | |
| 2 | RB | (Czech Republic) | Pospech | 31 | EU | 2008 (Winter) | 151 | 16 | 2011 | DKK 14m | |
| 3 | LB | (Sweden) | Bengtsson | 22 | EU | 2011 (Winter) | 8 | 0 | 2014 | Undisclosed | |
| 4 | CM | (Denmark) | Nørregaard (captain) | 29 | EU | 2006 | 320 | 34 | 2010 | Free | |
| 5 | CB | (Iceland) | Ottesen | 26 | EU | 2010 | 20 | 3 | 2013 | DK 7m | |
| 6 | CM | (Brazil) | Claudemir | 22 | Non-EU | 2010 | 45 | 4 | 2015 | Undisclosed | |
| 7 | CF | (Brazil) | Ailton | 25 | Non-EU | 2007 (Winter) | 137 | 37 | 2011 | DKK 22m | |
| 7 | CM | (Denmark) | Bergvold | 26 | EU | 2010 | 105 | 9 | 2013 | Free | |
| 8 | CM | (Denmark) | Kvist (captain) | 25 | EU | 2004 | 275 | 13 | 2012 | Youth system | |
| 9 | CF | (Denmark) | Nordstrand | 27 | EU | 2007 | 100 | 37 | 2012 | DKK 15m | |
| 10 | LW | (Denmark) (Greenland) | Grønkjær | 32 | EU | 2006 | 167 | 26 | 2011 | DKK 15m | |
| 11 | LW | (Brazil) | Santin | 29 | Non-EU | 2008 | 117 | 47 | 2013 | DKK 15m | |
| 12 | CB | (Sweden) | Larsson | 26 | EU | 2008 | 32 | 0 | 2013 | DKK 15m | |
| 14 | SS | (Senegal) | N'Doye | 25 | EU | 2009 (Winter) | 106 | 57 | 2013 | DKK 15m | |
| 15 | CB | (Sweden) | Antonsson | 29 | EU | 2007 | 126 | 3 | 2011 | Undisclosed | |
| 16 | CM | (Denmark) | T. Kristensen | 27 | EU | 2008 | 109 | 4 | 2012 | Undisclosed | |
| 17 | LB | (Sweden) | Wendt (VC) | 24 | EU | 2006 | 204 | 6 | 2011 | DKK 6m | |
| 18 | CF | (Denmark) | Zohore | 16 | EU | 2010 | 22 | 1 | ? | Youth system | |
| 19 | LB | (Costa Rica) | Oviedo | 20 | Non-EU | 2010 | 6 | 0 | 2013 | Undisclosed | |
| 20 | AM | (Denmark) | Vingaard | 25 | EU | 2009 (Winter) | 96 | 21 | 2012 | DKK 8m | |
| 21 | GK | (Sweden) | Wiland | 29 | EU | 2009 (Winter) | 82 | 0 | 2014 | DKK 8m | |
| 22 | LW | (Denmark) | Absalonsen | 24 | EU | 2011 | 3 | 0 | 2013 | Free | |
| 23 | AM | (Denmark) | Frederiksen | 20 | EU | 2010 | 4 | 2 | 2013 | DKK 2m | |
| 24 | CB | (Netherlands) | Hooiveld | 27 | EU | 2011 | 11 | 0 | 2011 | Loan | |
| 25 | CB | (Denmark) | Zanka | 20 | EU | 2007 | 125 | 10 | 2012 | Undisclosed | |
| 27 | CM | (Denmark) | Delaney | 18 | EU | 2009 | 33 | 2 | 2013 | Youth system | |
| 28 | DM | (Denmark) (Turkey) | Özdoğan | 20 | EU | 2009 | 12 | 0 | 2012 | Youth system | |
| 29 | RB | (Denmark) | D. Jensen | 21 | EU | 2008 | 5 | 0 | 2011 | Youth system | |
| 30 | RM | (Costa Rica) | Bolaños | 26 | Non-EU | 2010 | 32 | 6 | 2014 | DKK 7m | |

- Last updated: 29 May
- Source: F.C. Copenhagen, players' Wikipedia articles, SJAT.com (for contract endings)
- Ordered by squad number.

=== Squad stats ===
| | | | | Total | | | UEFA Champions League | | Danish Superliga | | Danish Cup | |
| No. | Pos. | Nat. | Name | Sts | App | Gls | App | Gls | App | Gls | App | Gls |
|---|---|---|---|---|---|---|---|---|---|---|---|---|
| 21 | GK | (Sweden) | Wiland | 44 | 44 | | 12 | | 32 | | | |
| 2 | RB | (Czech Republic) | Pospěch | 44 | 44 | 4 | 11 | | 33 | 4 | | |
| 25 | CB | (Denmark) | Zanka | 33 | 38 | 2 | 11 | | 25 | 1 | 2 | 1 |
| 15 | CB | (Sweden) | Antonsson | 40 | 40 | | 12 | | 28 | | | |
| 17 | LB | (Sweden) | Wendt | 40 | 41 | 1 | 12 | | 29 | 1 | | |
| 30 | RM | (Costa Rica) | Bolaños | 28 | 32 | 6 | 8 | | 24 | 6 | | |
| 8 | CM | (Denmark) | Kvist | 41 | 45 | 1 | 12 | 1 | 33 | | | |
| 6 | CM | (Brazil) | Claudemir | 43 | 45 | 5 | 12 | 1 | 32 | 4 | 1 | |
| 11 | LW | (Denmark) (Greenland) | Grønkjær | 28 | 38 | 6 | 12 | 2 | 25 | 4 | 1 | |
| 11 | LW | (Brazil) | Santin | 27 | 38 | 18 | 9 | 1 | 29 | 17 | | |
| 14 | SS | (Senegal) | N'Doye | 43 | 42 | 28 | 12 | 3 | 30 | 25 | | |
| 20 | AM | (Denmark) | Vingaard | 27 | 34 | 10 | 12 | 2 | 21 | 7 | 1 | 1 |
| 16 | CM | (Denmark) | T. Kristensen | 18 | 32 | 2 | 3 | | 27 | 1 | 2 | 1 |
| 18 | CF | (Denmark) | Zohore | 6 | 21 | 1 | 5 | | 15 | 1 | 1 | |
| 5 | CB | (Iceland) | Ottesen | 13 | 20 | 3 | 6 | 1 | 13 | 2 | 1 | |
| 27 | CM | (Denmark) | Delaney | 6 | 20 | 1 | 2 | | 16 | 1 | 2 | |
| 4 | CM | (Denmark) | Nørregaard | 8 | 18 | | 6 | | 10 | | 2 | |
| 24 | DF | (Netherlands) | Hooiveld | 7 | 11 | | | | 11 | | | |
| 3 | DF | (Sweden) | Bengtsson | 6 | 8 | | 2 | | 6 | | | |
| 7 | CM | (Denmark) | Bergvold | 1 | 7 | | 1 | | 6 | | | |
| 28 | DM | (Denmark) (Turkey) | Özdoğan | 1 | 6 | | | | 4 | | 2 | |
| 9 | CF | (Denmark) | Nordstrand | | 5 | 1 | | | 4 | 1 | 1 | |
| 12 | CB | (Sweden) | Larsson | 2 | 4 | | 2 | | | | 2 | |
| 23 | AM | (Denmark) | Frederiksen | 2 | 4 | 2 | | | 2 | | 2 | 2 |
| 1 | GK | (Denmark) | K. Christensen | 3 | 3 | | | | 1 | | 2 | |
| 19 | LB | (Costa Rica) | Oviedo | 2 | 3 | | | | 1 | | 2 | |
| 22 | FW | (Denmark) | Absalonsen | 1 | 3 | | | | 3 | | | |
| 7 | CF | (Brazil) | Aílton | 1 | 1 | | | | 1 | | | |
| 26 | DF | (Denmark) | Skovgaard | | 1 | | | | | | 1 | |
| 29 | RB | (Denmark) | D. Jensen | 1 | 1 | | | | | | 1 | |
| 32 | DF | (Denmark) | Lindbjerg | | 1 | | | | | | 1 | |
| 34 | DF | (Denmark) | Thomsen | | 1 | | | | | | 1 | |

Last updated: 29 May
Source: FCK.dk
Ordered by Starting 11 then appearances
0 shown as blank

=== Starting 11 ===
This section shows the most used players for each position considering a 4-4-2 formation.

| No. | Pos. | Nat. | Name | MS | Notes |
|---|---|---|---|---|---|
| 21 | GK | (Sweden) | Wiland | 44 | |
| 2 | RB | (Czech Republic) | Pospěch | 44 | |
| 25 | CB | (Denmark) | Zanka | 33 | |
| 15 | CB | (Sweden) | Antonsson | 40 | |
| 17 | LB | (Sweden) | Wendt | 40 | |
| 30 | RM | (Costa Rica) | Bolaños | 28 | |
| 23 | CM | (Denmark) | Kvist | 41 | |
| 6 | CM | (Brazil) | Claudemir | 43 | |
| 10 | LM | (Denmark) | Grønkjær | 28 | |
| 11 | CF | (Brazil) | Santin | 27 | |
| 14 | CF | (Senegal) | N'Doye | 43 | |

Last updated: 29 May
Source: Squad stats and Start formations.
Only competitive matches.
Using the most used start formation.
Ordered by position on pitch (from back right to front left).

=== Players in / out ===
==== In ====
| No. | Pos. | Nat. | Name | Age | EU | Moving from | Type | Transfer window | Ends | Transfer fee | Source |
|---|---|---|---|---|---|---|---|---|---|---|---|
| 18 | CF | (Denmark) | Zohore | 16 | EU | Youth system | Promoted | Summer | 2010 | Youth system | FCK.dk |
| 9 | CF | (Denmark) | Nordstrand | 27 | EU | Groningen (Netherlands) | End of loan | Summer | 2012 | n/a | |
| | AM | (Denmark) | Frederiksen | 20 | EU | SønderjyskE | Transfer | Summer | 2013 | DKK 2,000,000 | FCK.dk |
| 1 | GK | (Denmark) | K. Christensen | 30 | EU | IFK Göteborg (Sweden) | Transfer | Summer | 2013 | Undisclosed | FCK.dk |
| 5 | CB | (Iceland) | Ottesen | 26 | EU | SønderjyskE | Transfer | Summer | 2013 | DKK 7,000,000 | FCK.dk |
| 6 | CM | (Brazil) | Claudemir | 22 | Non-EU | Vitesse Arnhem (Netherlands) | Transfer | Summer | 2015 | DKK 7,500,000 | FCK.dk |
| 7 | CM | (Denmark) | Bergvold | 26 | EU | Free agent | Transfer | Summer | 2013 | Free | FCK.dk |
| 30 | RM | (Costa Rica) | Bolaños | 26 | Non-EU | Start (Norway) | Transfer | Summer | 2014 | DKK 7,000,000 | FCK.dk |
| 23 | AM | (Denmark) | Frederiksen | 21 | EU | SønderjyskE | End of loan | Summer | 2013 | DKK 1,000,000 | FCK.dk |
| 22 | LW | (Denmark) | Absalonsen | 25 | EU | OB | Transfer | Winter | 2013 | Free | FCK.dk |
| 24 | CB | (Netherlands) | Hooiveld | 27 | EU | Celtic (Scotland) | Loan | Winter | 2011 | n/a | FCK.dk |
| 3 | LB | (Sweden) | Bengtsson | 22 | EU | Nordsjælland | Transfer | Winter | 2014 | Undisclosed | FCK.dk |

==== Out ====
| No. | Pos. | Nat. | Name | Age | EU | Moving to | Type | Transfer window | Transfer fee | Source |
|---|---|---|---|---|---|---|---|---|---|---|
| 5 | CB | (Denmark) | Laursen | 34 | EU | | Retired | Summer | n/a | FCK.dk |
| 13 | CM | (Canada) | Hutchinson | 27 | Non-EU | PSV (Netherlands) | Contract ended | Summer | Free | PSV.nl |
| 30 | CB | (Denmark) | Albrechtsen | 20 | EU | | Contract ended | Summer | n/a | |
| | AM | (Denmark) | Frederiksen | 20 | EU | SønderjyskE | Loan | Summer | n/a | SoenderjyskE.dk |
| 1 | GK | (Denmark) | Christiansen | 32 | EU | IF Elfsborg (Sweden) | Transfer | Summer | DKK 5,000,000 | Elfsborg.se |
| 7 | CF | (Brazil) | Aílton | 25 | Non-EU | APOEL (Cyprus) | Transfer | Summer | DKK 7,000,000 | FCK.dk |
| 4 | CM | (Denmark) | Nørregaard | 29 | EU | AGF | Contract ended | Winter | n/a | AGFFodbold.dk |
| 9 | CF | (Denmark) | Nordstrand | 27 | EU | Nordsjælland | Loan | Winter | n/a | FCN.dk |
| 19 | LB | (Costa Rica) | Oviedo | 20 | Non-EU | Nordsjælland | Loan | Winter | n/a | FCN.dk |
| 23 | AM | (Denmark) | Frederiksen | 21 | EU | SønderjyskE | Loan | Winter | n/a | SoenderjyskE.dk |
| 12 | CB | (Sweden) | Larsson | 26 | EU | Helsingborgs IF (Sweden) | Loan | Winter | n/a | |

Last updated: 2 February

== Club ==
=== Coaching staff ===
| Position | Staff |
|---|---|
| Manager | (Norway) Ståle Solbakken |
| Assistant manager | (Norway) Bård Wiggen |
| Goalkeeping coach | (Denmark) Per Wind |
| Fitness coach | (Denmark) Anders Storskov |
| A+ coach | (Denmark) Johan Lange |
| Chief scout | (Denmark) Lars Højer |

Last updated: 21 August
Source: F.C. Copenhagen

=== Kit ===
Supplier: Kappa
Sponsor(s): Carlsberg

| Home; Domestic | Away; Domestic | Home; Europe | Away; Europe | Third kit |

Source: FCK.dk

=== Other information ===
| Chairman | (Denmark) Hans Munk Nielsen |
| Sport director | (Denmark) Carsten V. Jensen |
| Ground (capacity and dimensions) | Parken (38,065 / 105x68 m) |

Updated to match played 12 June
Source: F.C. Copenhagen and Parken Stadium

== Competitions ==
=== Overall ===
| Competition | Started round | Current position / round | Final position / round | First match | Last match |
|---|---|---|---|---|---|
| Danish Superliga | — | — | 1st | 18 July | 29 May |
| UEFA Champions League | Third qualifying round | — | Round of 16 | 27 July | 16 March |
| Danish Cup | Third round | — | Fourth round | 22 September | 27 October |

Updated to match played 29 May
Source: Competitions

=== Danish Superliga ===
==== Classification ====
| Pos | Team | Pld | W | D | L | GF | GA | GD | Pts | Qualification or relegation |
|---|---|---|---|---|---|---|---|---|---|---|
| 1 | Copenhagen (C) | 33 | 25 | 6 | 2 | 77 | 29 | +48 | 81 | Qualification to Champions League third qualifying round |
| 2 | OB | 33 | 16 | 7 | 10 | 55 | 41 | +14 | 55 | Qualification to Champions League third qualifying round |
| 3 | Brøndby | 33 | 13 | 12 | 8 | 52 | 39 | +13 | 51 | Qualification to Europa League third qualifying round |
| 4 | Midtjylland | 33 | 13 | 10 | 10 | 50 | 42 | +8 | 49 | Qualification to Europa League second qualifying round |
| 5 | Silkeborg | 33 | 10 | 13 | 10 | 43 | 49 | −6 | 43 | |

Source: Danish Football Association
Rules for classification: 1) points; 2) goal difference; 3) number of goals scored.
(C) Champions

==== Results summary ====
| Overall | | | | | | | | Home | | | | | | Away | | | | | |
| Pld | W | D | L | GF | GA | GD | Pts | W | D | L | GF | GA | GD | W | D | L | GF | GA | GD |
|---|---|---|---|---|---|---|---|---|---|---|---|---|---|---|---|---|---|---|---|
| 33 | 25 | 6 | 2 | 76 | 28 | +48 | 81 | 15 | 2 | 0 | 46 | 11 | +35 | 10 | 4 | 2 | 30 | 17 | +13 |

Last updated: 29 May.

==== Results by round ====
| Round | 1 | 2 | 3 | 4 | 5 | 6 | 7 | 8 | 9 | 10 | 11 | 12 | 13 | 14 | 15 | 16 | 17 | 18 | 19 | 20 | 21 | 22 | 23 | 24 | 25 | 26 | 27 | 28 | 29 | 30 | 31 | 32 | 33 |
|---|---|---|---|---|---|---|---|---|---|---|---|---|---|---|---|---|---|---|---|---|---|---|---|---|---|---|---|---|---|---|---|---|---|
| Ground | A | A | H | A | H | H | A | H | H | A | H | H | A | H | H | A | H | A | H | A | A | H | A | H | A | A | H | H | A | A | H | A | H |
| Result | W | W | D | W | W | W | W | D | W | W | W | W | W | W | W | D | W | W | W | L | W | W | D | W | W | W | W | W | D | D | W | L | W |

Updated to match(es) played on 25 May. Source: Competitive Matches
A = Away; H = Home; W = Win; D = Draw; L = Loss

=== UEFA Champions League ===
==== Third qualifying round ====
| Team 1 | Agg. | Team 2 | 1st leg | 2nd leg |
|---|---|---|---|---|
| BATE Borisov (Belarus) | 2–3 | (Denmark) Copenhagen | 0–0 | 2–3 |

Source: UEFA Champions League

==== Play-off round ====
| Team 1 | Agg. | Team 2 | 1st leg | 2nd leg |
|---|---|---|---|---|
| Rosenborg (Norway) | 2–2 (a) | (Denmark) Copenhagen | 2–1 | 0–1 |

Source: UEFA Champions League

==== Group D ====
===== Classification =====
| Pos | Team | Pld | W | D | L | GF | GA | GD | Pts | Qualification | BAR | CPH | RUB | PAN |
|---|---|---|---|---|---|---|---|---|---|---|---|---|---|---|
| 1 | (Spain) Barcelona | 6 | 4 | 2 | 0 | 14 | 3 | +11 | 14 | Advance to knockout phase | — | 2–0 | 2–0 | 5–1 |
| 2 | (Denmark) Copenhagen | 6 | 3 | 1 | 2 | 7 | 5 | +2 | 10 | Advance to knockout phase | 1–1 | — | 1–0 | 3–1 |
| 3 | (Russia) Rubin Kazan | 6 | 1 | 3 | 2 | 2 | 4 | −2 | 6 | Transfer to Europa League | 1–1 | 1–0 | — | 0–0 |
| 4 | (Greece) Panathinaikos | 6 | 0 | 2 | 4 | 2 | 13 | −11 | 2 | | 0–3 | 0–2 | 0–0 | — |

Source: Soccerway

===== Results by round =====
| Round | 1 | 2 | 3 | 4 | 5 | 6 |
|---|---|---|---|---|---|---|
| Ground | H | A | A | H | A | H |
| Result | W | W | L | D | L | W |

Updated to match(es) played on 10 December. Source: UEFA Champions League
A = Away; H = Home; W = Win; D = Draw; L = Loss

==== Round of 16 ====
| Team 1 | Agg. | Team 2 | 1st leg | 2nd leg |
|---|---|---|---|---|
| Copenhagen (Denmark) | 0–2 | (England) Chelsea | 0–2 | 0–0 |

Last updated: 22 February.
Source: UEFA Champions League

==== Results summary ====
| Overall | | | | | | | | Home | | | | | | Away | | | | | |
| Pld | W | D | L | GF | GA | GD | Pts | W | D | L | GF | GA | GD | W | D | L | GF | GA | GD |
|---|---|---|---|---|---|---|---|---|---|---|---|---|---|---|---|---|---|---|---|
| 12 | 5 | 3 | 4 | 12 | 11 | +1 | 18 | 4 | 1 | 1 | 9 | 6 | +3 | 1 | 2 | 3 | 3 | 5 | −2 |

Last updated: 16 March.

== Matches ==
=== Competitive ===
| Game | Date | Tournament | Round | Ground | Opponent | Score^{1} | TV | Report |
|---|---|---|---|---|---|---|---|---|
| 1 | 18 July | Danish Superliga | 1 | A | SønderjyskE | 3–1 | TV3+ | Report / Report link; Kick off / 18:00 CEST; Attendance / 4,671; Referee / Michael Svendsen; Copenhagen / SønderjyskE; Ottesen (yellow card) 19'; Larsen 53' (o.g.); Østli 82' (o.g.); Vingaard 83' / Hansen 20' (pen.) |
| 2 | 24 July | Danish Superliga | 2 | A | Esbjerg fB | 2–1 | Canal 9 | Report / Report link; Kick off / 19:00 CEST; Attendance / 7,612; Referee / Claus Bo Larsen; Copenhagen / Esbjerg fB; Santin 23'; Vingaard 71' / Hansen (yellow card) 69'; Conboy 73' |
| 3 | 28 July | UEFA Champions League | Third qualifying round | A (Belarus) | BATE Borisov (Belarus) | 0–0 | TV3+ | Report / Report link; Kick off / 19:00 EEST; Attendance / 5,300; Referee / Alexandru Tudor; Copenhagen / BATE Borisov; N'Doye (yellow card) 14' / Shytaw (yellow card) 87' |
| 4 | 31 July | Danish Superliga | 3 | H | AaB | 1–1 | Canal 9 | Report / Report link; Kick off / 15:00 CEST; Attendance / 12,033; Referee / Anders Hermansen; Copenhagen / AaB; Santin 60' (pen.); N'Doye (yellow card) 66' / Bøgelund 7'; Nielsen (yellow card) 59'; Würtz (yellow card) 90' |
| 5 | 4 August | UEFA Champions League | Third qualifying round | H | BATE Borisov (Belarus) | 3–2 | DR1 | Report / Report link; Kick off / 19:10 EEST; Attendance / 15,533; Referee / Mark Clattenburg; Copenhagen / BATE Borisov; Santin 1'; Kvist 26'; N'Doye 59' / Kontsevoy 40'; Nyakhaychyk 44'; Pawlaw (yellow card) 45'; Nyakhaychyk (yellow card) 52'; Sosnovski (yellow card) 85'; Sosnovski (yellow card) 90' (yellow-red card) |
| 6 | 8 August | Danish Superliga | 4 | A | OB | 3–2 | TV3+ | Report / Report link; Kick off / 18:00 CEST; Attendance / 11,187; Referee / Nicolai Vollquartz; Copenhagen / OB; N'Doye 9'; Grønkjær 22'; Kvist (yellow card) 62'; N'Doye 88' / Gislason 30'; Ruud (yellow card) 45'; Traoré (yellow card) 52'; Andreasen 59' |
| 7 | 14 August | Danish Superliga | 5 | H | Nordsjælland | 2–0 | Canal 9 | Report / Report link; Kick off / 15:00 CEST; Attendance / 11,547; Referee / Michael Svendsen; Copenhagen / Nordsjælland; Kristensen (yellow card) 35'; N'Doye 44'; N'Doye 81' / Bernier (yellow card) 56' |
| 8 | 17 August | UEFA Champions League | Play-off round | A (Norway) | Rosenborg (Norway) | 1–2 | TV3+ | Report / Report link; Kick off / 20:45 CEST; Attendance / 18,822; Referee / Gianluca Rocchi; Copenhagen / Rosenborg; Vingaard (yellow card) 6'; Kvist (yellow card) 43'; Grønkjær 84' / Iversen 23'; Olsen (yellow card) 48'; Henriksen 57'; Annan (yellow card) 72' |
| 9 | 21 August | Danish Superliga | 6 | H | Lyngby Boldklub | 3–0 | Canal 9 | Report / Report link; Kick off / 15:00 CEST; Attendance / 12,041; Referee / Peter Rasmussen; Copenhagen / Lyngby Boldklub; Wendt 19'; N'Doye 25'; Santin 56' |
| 10 | 25 August | UEFA Champions League | Play-off round | H | Rosenborg (Norway) | 1–0 | TV3+ | Report / Report link; Kick off / 20:45 CEST; Attendance / 31,180; Referee / Felix Brych; Copenhagen / Rosenborg; Ottesen 33' / Stadsgaard (yellow card) 45'; Henriksen (yellow card) 83' |
| 11 | 29 August | Danish Superliga | 7 | A | Horsens | 2–1 | TV3+ | Report / Report link; Kick off / 18:00 CEST; Attendance / 5,816; Referee / Lars Christoffersen; Copenhagen / Horsens; Ottesen 22'; Ottesen (yellow card) 56'; Vingaard 75' / Lodberg 15'; Augustsson (yellow card) 27'; Aslam (red card) 45'; Lodberg (yellow card) 45' |
| 12 | 11 September | Danish Superliga | 8 | H | Silkeborg IF | 2–2 | Canal 9 | Report / Report link; Kick off / 15:00 CEST; Attendance / 13,018; Referee / Nicolai Vollquartz; Copenhagen / Silkeborg IF; Santin (yellow card) 48'; Santin 57'; N'Doye 59'; Wendt (yellow card) 90' / Svensson 19'; Saag 54'; Flinta (yellow card) 71'; Huldgaard (yellow card) 90' |
| 13 | 14 September | UEFA Champions League | Group stage | H | Rubin Kazan (Russia) | 1–0 | TV3+ | Report / Report link; Kick off / 20:45 CEST; Attendance / 29,561; Referee / Thomas Einwaller; Copenhagen / Rubin Kazan; N'Doye 87' / Orekhov (yellow card) 61'; Kaleshin (yellow card) 84' |
| 14 | 19 September | Danish Superliga | 9 | H | Brøndby | 2–0 | TV3+ | Report / Report link; Kick off / 18:00 CEST; Attendance / 28,215; Referee / Claus Bo Larsen; Copenhagen / Brøndby; Santin 7' (pen.); Wendt (yellow card) 27'; Santin 58' / Krohn-Dehli (yellow card) 10' |
| 15 | 22 September | Danish Cup | Third round | A | Viby IF | 4–1 | 6'eren | Report / Report link; Kick off / 16:00 CEST; Attendance / 1,500; Referee / Henning Jensen; Copenhagen / Viby IF; Vingaard 23'; Frederiksen 27'; Frederiksen 31'; Serwin 59' (o.g.) / Meldgaard 12' |
| 16 | 25 September | Danish Superliga | 10 | A | Midtjylland | 3–0 | TV3+ | Report / Report link; Kick off / 15:00 CEST; Attendance / 11,055; Referee / Lars Christoffersen; Copenhagen / Midtjylland; Grønkjær (yellow card) 7'; Pospěch 11'; Claudemir 39'; Zanka (yellow card) 48'; Kvist (yellow card) 55'; N'Doye 70' / Juelsgård (yellow card) 52'; Priske (yellow card) 64' |
| 17 | 29 September | UEFA Champions League | Group stage | A (Greece) | Panathinaikos (Greece) | 2–0 | TV3+ | Report / Report link; Kick off / 21:45 CEST; Referee / William Collum; Copenhagen / Panathinaikos; Claudemir (yellow card) 9'; N'Doye 28'; Vingaard 37'; N'Doye (yellow card) 51' / Gilberto Silva (yellow card) 36'; Gilberto Silva (yellow card) 48' (yellow-red card); Karagounis (yellow card) 72' |
| 18 | 3 October | Danish Superliga | 11 | H | Randers FC | 1–0 | TV3+ | Report / Report link; Kick off / 18:00 CEST; Attendance / 16,312; Referee / Michael Svendsen; Copenhagen / Randers FC; Zanka (yellow card) 16'; N'Doye 58' / Sarr (yellow card) 70'; Egholm (yellow card) 84' |
| 19 | 17 October | Danish Superliga | 12 | H | OB | 5–0 | TV3+ | Report / Report link; Kick off / 18:00 CEST; Attendance / 17,635; Referee / Anders Hermansen; Copenhagen / OB; Santin 4'; Vingaard 19'; Santin 37'; Santin 59'; Kristensen (yellow card) 77'; N'Doye 90' / Djemba-Djemba (yellow card) 36'; Utaka (yellow card) 43'; Sørensen (yellow card) 76' |
| 20 | 20 October | UEFA Champions League | Group stage | A (Spain) | Barcelona (Spain) | 0–2 | TV3+ | Report / Report link; Kick off / 20:45 CEST; Attendance / 75,852; Referee / Stéphane Lannoy; Copenhagen / Barcelona; N'Doye (yellow card) 61'; Pospěch (yellow card) 68' / Messi 19'; Xavi (yellow card) 81'; Messi 90' |
| 21 | 24 October | Danish Superliga | 13 | A | Silkeborg IF | 3–0 | DR1 | Report / Report link; Kick off / 16:00 CEST; Attendance / 6,055; Referee / Michael Johansen; Copenhagen / Silkeborg IF; Santin 17'; Vingaard 59'; Bolaños 72' / Flinta (yellow card) 45' |
| 22 | 26–28 October | Danish Cup | Fourth round | H | Horsens | 2–4 | 6'eren | Report / Report link; Kick off / 20:00 CEST; Attendance / 6,049; Referee / Kenn Hansen; Copenhagen / Horsens; Nørregaard (yellow card) 12'; Kristensen 35'; Zanka 72' / Kortegaard 30'; Rasmussen 42'; Lodberg 60' (pen.); Gilberto 82' |
| 23 | 30 October | Danish Superliga | 14 | H | Lyngby Boldklub | 3–2 | Canal 9 | Report / Report link; Kick off / 15:00 CEST; Attendance / 14,263; Referee / Thomas Vejlgaard; Copenhagen / Lyngby Boldklub; Zohore 13'; N'Doye (yellow card) 67'; Zanka (yellow card) 67'; Nordstrand 87'; Ottesen 90' / Aabech 22'; Sarr (yellow card) 25'; Bertolt (yellow card) 78'; Riise 86'; Henriksen (yellow card) 90' |
| 24 | 2 November | UEFA Champions League | Group stage | H | Barcelona (Spain) | 1–1 | TV3+ | Report / Report link; Kick off / 20:45 CET; Attendance / 37,049; Referee / Pavel Crisitan Balaj; Copenhagen / Barcelona; Claudemir 32'; Pospěch (yellow card) 89' / Messi 31'; Busquets (yellow card) 50' |
| 25 | 7 November | Danish Superliga | 15 | H | Horsens | 4–0 | Canal 9 | Report / Report link; Kick off / 16:00 CET; Attendance / 15,529; Referee / Emil Laursen; Copenhagen / Horsens; Santin 8'; Vingaard 14'; Bolaños 71'; Zanka 89' |
| 26 | 14 November | Danish Superliga | 16 | A | SønderjyskE | 3–3 | Canal 9 | Report / Report link; Kick off / 16:00 CET; Attendance / 4,377; Referee / Claus Bo Larsen; Copenhagen / SønderjyskE; N'Doye 52'; Vingaard 63'; N'Doye 90'; Nordstrand (yellow card) 90' / Hansen 40' (pen.); Kučuković 48'; Fabricius 59'; Hansen (yellow card) 84' |
| 27 | 21 November | Danish Superliga | 17 | H | Nordsjælland | 2–1 | Canal 9 | Report / Report link; Kick off / 16:00 CET; Attendance / 15,077; Referee / Peter Rasmussen; Copenhagen / Nordsjælland; Claudemir 30'; Santin 32' (pen.); Wendt (yellow card) 38' / Kildentoft (yellow card) 20'; Adu (yellow card) 32'; Bernier (yellow card) 44'; Gytkjær 75' |
| 28 | 24 November | UEFA Champions League | Group stage | A (Russia) | Rubin Kazan (Russia) | 0–1 | TV3+ | Report / Report link; Kick off / 20:30 MSK; Referee / Martin Atkinson; Copenhagen / Rubin Kazan; Bolaños (yellow card) 10'; Wendt (yellow card) 72' / Ryazantsev (yellow card) 42'; Noboa 45' (pen.); Kaleshin (yellow card) 79' |
| 29 | 28 November | Danish Superliga | 18 | A | Randers FC | 3–0 | Canal 9 | Report / Report link; Kick off / 16:00 CET; Attendance / 3,480; Referee / Kenn Hansen; Copenhagen / Randers FC; Santin 29'; Pospěch 60'; Grønkjær 74'; Nordstrand (yellow card) 79' / Movsisyan (yellow card) 45'; Ahmed (yellow card) 66' |
| 30 | 4 December | Danish Superliga | 19 | H | Esbjerg fB | 3–1 | Canal 9 | Report / Report link; Kick off / 15:00 CET; Attendance / 14,074; Referee / Jakob Kehlet; Copenhagen / Esbjerg fB; N'Doye 18'; Pospěch 23'; N'Doye 88' / Vendelboe (yellow card) 27'; Lange 51' |
| 31 | 7 December | UEFA Champions League | Group stage | H | Panathinaikos (Greece) | 3–1 | TV3+ | Report / Report link; Kick off / 20:45 CET; Attendance / 36,797; Referee / Florian Meyer; Copenhagen / Panathinaikos; Vingaard 26'; Grønkjær 50' (pen.); Grønkjær (yellow card) 54'; Cissé 73' (o.g.) / Simão (yellow card) 12'; Marinos (yellow card) 44'; Garcia (yellow card) 45'; Leto (yellow card) 67'; Kanté 90' |
| 32 | 22 February | UEFA Champions League | Round of 16 | H | Chelsea (England) | 0–2 | TV3+ | Report / Report link; Kick off / 20:45 CET; Attendance / 36,713; Referee / Björn Kuipers; Copenhagen / Chelsea; Zanka (yellow card) 7'; Pospěch (yellow card) 70' / Anelka 17'; Torres (yellow card) 35'; Anelka 54'; Malouda (yellow card) 85'; Terry (yellow card) 86' |
| 33 | 6 March | Danish Superliga | 20 | A | Midtjylland | 0–2 | TV3+ | Report / Report link; Kick off / 18:00 CET; Attendance / 10,390; Referee / Michael Svendsen; Copenhagen / Midtjylland; Zanka (yellow card) 62' / Albrechtsen (yellow card) 21'; Bak (yellow card) 60'; Poulsen 63' (pen.); Thygesen 82' |
| 34 | 12 March | Danish Superliga | 21 | A | AaB | 1–0 | TV3+ | Report / Report link; Kick off / 19:00 CET; Attendance / 8,765; Referee / Anders Hermansen; Copenhagen / AaB; N'Doye (yellow card) 24'; Bolaños 76' / Augustinussen (yellow card) 45' |
| 35 | 16 March | UEFA Champions League | Round of 16 | A (England) | Chelsea (England) | 0–0 | TV3+ | Report / Report link; Kick off / 19:45 GMT; Attendance / 36,454; Referee / Svein Oddvar Moen; Copenhagen / Chelsea; Claudemir (yellow card) 67'; Bolaños (yellow card) 81' / Drogba (yellow card) 54' |
| 36 | 20 March | Danish Superliga | 22 | H | Brøndby | 3–1 | TV3+ | Report / Report link; Kick off / 18:00 CET; Attendance / 28,387; Referee / Peter Rasmussen; Copenhagen / Brøndby; Santin 47'; N'Doye 69'; Grønkjær 90' / Agger 25' |
| 37 | 2 April | Danish Superliga | 23 | A | Esbjerg fB | 1–1 | Canal 9 | Report / Report link; Kick off / 15:00 CEST; Attendance / 9,102; Referee / Claus Bo Larsen; Copenhagen / Esbjerg fB; Santin 38'; Zanka (yellow card) 52' / Janssen 90' |
| 38 | 9 April | Danish Superliga | 24 | H | Randers FC | 3–1 | Canal 9 | Report / Report link; Kick off / 15:00 CEST; Attendance / 18,018; Referee / Nicolai Vollquartz; Copenhagen / Randers FC; N'Doye 19'; Pospěch 30'; Dame N'Doye 33' / Beckmann (yellow card) 40'; Sarr 76' |
| 39 | 17 April | Danish Superliga | 25 | A | Nordsjælland | 3–1 | Canal 9 | Report / Report link; Kick off / 16:00 CEST; Attendance / 8,213; Referee / Peter Rasmussen; Copenhagen / Nordsjælland; Mikkelsen 19' / N'Doye 29'; Claudemir 64'; N'Doye 87' |
| 40 | 21 April | Danish Superliga | 26 | A | Lyngby Boldklub | 2–1 | Canal 9 | Report / Report link; Kick off / 16:00 CEST; Attendance / 6,171; Referee / Michael Svendsen; Copenhagen / Lyngby Boldklub; Bolaños 25'; Bolaños (yellow card) 73'; N'Doye 86'; N'Doye (yellow card) 87' / Madsen 8'; Hamalainen (yellow card) 38' |
| 41 | 25 April | Danish Superliga | 24 | H | Silkeborg IF | 2–0 | DR1 | Report / Report link; Kick off / 16:00 CEST; Attendance / 18,474; Referee / Kenn Hansen; Copenhagen / Silkeborg IF; Bolaños (yellow card) 70'; Claudemir 76'; Bolaños 84'; Delaney (yellow card) 90' / Holst (yellow card) 61' |
| 42 | 1 May | Danish Superliga | 28 | H | SønderjyskE | 3–0 | Canal 9 | Report / Report link; Kick off / 16:00 CEST; Attendance / 15,701; Referee / Michael Tykgaard; Copenhagen / SønderjyskE; Kristensen 16'; N'Doye 32'; Bolaños (yellow card) 68'; N'Doye 80' |
| 43 | 8 May | Danish Superliga | 29 | A | Brøndby | 1–1 | TV3+ | Report / Report link; Kick off / 18:15 CEST; Attendance / 18,113; Referee / Lars Christoffersen; Copenhagen / Brøndby; N'Doye 5'; Claudemir (yellow card) 42'; Wendt (yellow card) 75' / van der Schaaf 17' van der Schaaf (yellow card) 42' |
| 44 | 16 May | Danish Superliga | 30 | A | Horsens | 1–1 | TV 2 Sport | Report / Report link; Kick off / 19:00 CEST; Attendance / 7,370; Referee / Claus Bo Larsen; Copenhagen / Horsens; Delaney 3' / Gilberto 14' |
| 45 | 19 May | Danish Superliga | 31 | H | Midtjylland | 5–2 | TV3+ | Report / Report link; Kick off / 20:00 CEST; Attendance / 17,101; Referee / Anders Hermansen; Copenhagen / Midtjylland; N'Doye 27'; N'Doye 31'; Bolaños 57'; N'Doye 71'; Santin 83' / Albrechtsen 16'; Albæk 64' (pen.) |
| 46 | 25 May | Danish Superliga | 32 | A | OB | 0–3 | TV3+ | Report / Report link; Kick off / 20:00 CEST; Attendance / 10,843; Referee / Michael Svendsen; Copenhagen / OB; Santin (yellow card) 62' / Ruud 10'; Traoré (yellow card) 65'; Johansson 67'; Utaka 82' |
| 47 | 29 May | Danish Superliga | 33 | H | AaB | 2–0 | TV3+ | Report / Report link; Kick off / 16:00 CEST; Attendance / 27,092; Referee / Nicolai Vollquartz; Copenhagen / AaB; Santin 26'; Grønkjær 45' / Petersen (yellow card) 32' |

Last updated: 29 May
Source: FCK.dk
^{1}F.C. Copenhagen goals come first.
National flags for Ground and Opponent columns are only shown when different from that of F.C. Copenhagen.
M = Match; Ground: H = Home, A = Away, N = Neutral, HR = Home replacement, AR = Away replacement.
