= 2009–10 F.C. Copenhagen season =

F.C. Copenhagen
2009–10 season
- Chairman: Flemming Østergaard; Lars Johansen
- Manager: Ståle Solbakken
- Danish Superliga: Winners
- Danish Cup: Fourth round
- UEFA Champions League: Play-off round
- UEFA Europa League: Round of 32
- Top goalscorer: League: Dame N'Doye (14); All: Dame N'Doye (24)
- Highest home attendance: 30,191 (vs Brøndby IF, 14 March 2010)
- Lowest home attendance: 11,567 (vs CFR Cluj, 3 December 2009)
- Average home league attendance: 18,382
Home colours	Away colours

This article shows statistics of individual players for the football club F.C. Copenhagen. It also lists all matches that F.C. Copenhagen will play in the 2009–10 season.

== Players ==
=== Squad information ===
This section show the squad as currently, considering all players who are confirmedly moved in and out (see section Players in / out).

N	Pos.	Nat.	Name	Age	EU	Since	App	Goals	Ends	Transfer fee	Notes
1	GK	(Denmark)	Christiansen (VC1)	48	EU	2005	211	0	2012	Undisclosed	
2	RB	(Czech Republic)	Pospech	47	EU	2008 (Winter)	108	12	2011	DKK 14m	
3	LB	(Denmark)	N. Jensen	51	EU	2007 (Winter)	213	10	2009	Free	
4	CM	(Denmark)	Nørregaard (captain)	45	EU	2006	302	34	2010	Free	
5	CB	(Denmark)	Laursen	50	EU	2008 (Winter)	70	0	2011	Undisclosed	
7	CF	(Brazil)	Ailton	41	Non-EU	2007 (Winter)	136	37	2011	DKK 22m	
8	CM	(Denmark)	Kvist (VC2)	41	EU	2004	230	12	2012	Youth system	
9	CF	(Denmark)	Nordstrand	42	EU	2007	95	36	2012	DKK 15m	
10	LW	(Denmark) (Greenland)	Grønkjær	48	EU	2006	129	20	2010	DKK 15m	
11	LW	(Brazil)	Santin	45	Non-EU	2008	81	29	2013	DKK 15m	
12	CB	(Sweden)	Larsson	42	EU	2008	27	0	2013	DKK 15m	
13	CM	(Canada)	Hutchinson	43	Non-EU	2006 (Winter)	214	29	2010	DKK 8m	
14	SS	(Senegal)	N'Doye	41	EU	2009 (Winter)	63	29	2013	DKK 15m	
15	CB	(Sweden)	Antonsson	44	EU	2007	87	3	2011	Undisclosed	
16	CM	(Denmark)	Kristensen	43	EU	2008	77	2	2012	Undisclosed	
17	LB	(Sweden)	Wendt	40	EU	2006	163	4	2011	DKK 6m	
18	CF	(Denmark)	Zohore	32	EU	2010	1	0	?	Youth system	
19	LB	(Costa Rica)	Oviedo	36	Non-EU	2010	3	0	2013	Undisclosed	
20	AM	(Denmark)	Vingaard	41	EU	2009 (Winter)	62	11	2012	DKK 8m	
21	GK	(Sweden)	Wiland	45	EU	2009 (Winter)	38	0	2014	DKK 8m	
24	RW	(Czech Republic)	Sionko	49	EU	2007	89	12	2011	Free	
25	CB	(Denmark)	Zanka	36	EU	2007	86	8	2012	Undisclosed	
27	CM	(Denmark)	Delaney	34	EU	2009	14	1	2013	Youth system	
28	DM	(Denmark) (Turkey)	Özdoğan	36	EU	2009	6	0	2012	Youth system	
29	RB	(Denmark)	D. Jensen	36	EU	2008	4	0	2011	Youth system	
30	CB	(Denmark)	Albrechtsen	36	EU	2008	1	0	2010	Youth system	
41	GK	(Australia)	Coe	41	Non-EU	2007 (Winter)	5	0	2009	Undisclosed	
41	GK	(Norway)	Nilssen	50	EU	2009	0	0	2009	Loan	

- Last updated: 16 May
- Source: F.C. Copenhagen, players' Wikipedia articles, SJAT.com (for contract endings)
- Ordered by squad number.

=== Squad stats ===
				Total			UEFA Champions League		Danish Superliga		Danish Cup		UEFA Europa League	
No.	Pos.	Nat.	Name	Sts	App	Gls	App	Gls	App	Gls	App	Gls	App	Gls
21	GK	(Sweden)	Wiland	34	35		1		24		2		8	
2	RB	(Czech Republic)	Pospěch	41	42	7	5	1	31	6			6	
25	CB	(Denmark)	Zanka	30	34	5	6	1	23	4	1		4	
15	CB	(Sweden)	Antonsson	38	39	2	6		25	2	1		7	
17	LB	(Denmark)	Wendt	47	47	2	5		33	2	1		8	
8	CM	(Denmark)	Kvist	47	48	2	6		33	2	1		8	
13	CM	(Canada)	Hutchinson	43	44	3	4		30	3	2		8	
4	CM	(Denmark)	Nørregaard	40	44	3	5		31	3	1		7	
20	AM	(Denmark)	Vingaard	34	46	8	4	1	32	6	2		8	1
10	LW	(Denmark) (Greenland)	Grønkjær	30	42	6	5	1	29	2	1		7	3
14	SS	(Senegal)	N'Doye	34	46	24	5	5	31	14	2	1	8	4
7	CF	(Brazil)	Aílton	23	39	8	6	2	25	4	2	1	6	1
11	LW	(Brazil)	Santin	29	38	13	4	2	27	11	1		6	
16	CM	(Denmark)	Kristensen	11	33	1	4	1	23		2		4	
5	CB	(Denmark)	Laursen	17	19		1		13		1		4	
1	GK	(Denmark)	Christiansen	15	16		5		11					
12	CB	(Sweden)	Larsson	12	16		1		12		1		2	
27	CM	(Denmark)	Delaney	2	12	1	1	1	9				2	
9	CF	(Denmark)	Nordstrand	2	11	4	6	2	5	2				
24	RW	(Czech Republic)	Sionko	4	11		2		4		2		3	
3	LB	(Denmark)	N. Jensen	3	4		1				2		1	
28	DM	(Denmark) (Turkey)	Özdoğan		4		1		2				1	
19	LB	(Costa Rica)	Oviedo		3				3					
18	CF	(Denmark)	Zohore		1				1					
29	RB	(Denmark)	D. Jensen											
30	CB	(Denmark)	Albrechtsen											
41	GK	(Australia)	Coe											
41	GK	(Norway)	Nilssen											

Last updated: 16 May
Source: FCK.dk
Ordered by Starting 11 then appearances
0 shown as blank

=== Starting 11 ===
This section shows the most used players for each position considering a 4-4-2 formation.

No.	Pos.	Nat.	Name	MS	Notes
21	GK	(Sweden)	Wiland	34	
2	RB	(Czech Republic)	Pospěch	44	
25	CB	(Denmark)	Zanka	30	
15	CB	(Sweden)	Antonsson	38	
17	LB	(Sweden)	Wendt	47	
23	RM	(Denmark)	Kvist	47	
13	CM	(Canada)	Hutchinson	43	
4	CM	(Denmark)	Nørregaard	40	
20	LM	(Denmark)	Vingaard	34	
10	SS	(Denmark)	Grønkjær	30	
14	CF	(Senegal)	N'Doye	34	

Last updated: 16 May
Source: Squad stats and Start formations.
Only competitive matches.
Using the most used start formation.
Ordered by position on pitch (from back right to front left).

=== Players in / out ===
==== In ====
No.	Pos.	Nat.	Name	Age	EU	Moving from	Type	Transfer window	Ends	Transfer fee	Source
27	CM	(Denmark)	Delaney	17	EU	Youth system	Promoted	Summer	?	Youth system	FCK.dk
28	DM	(Denmark) (Turkey)	Özdoğan	19	EU	Youth system	Promoted	Summer	2010	Youth system	FCK.dk
6	DM	(Denmark)	Würtz	25	EU	Vejle B	End of loan	Summer	2012	n/a	FCK.dk
18	CF	(Denmark)	Júnior	33	EU	Nordsjælland	End of loan	Summer	2010	n/a	FCK.dk
41	GK	(Australia)	Coe	25	Non-EU	Örgryte (Sweden)	End of loan	Summer	2009	n/a	FCK.dk
41	GK	(Norway)	Nilssen	33	EU	Start (Norway)	Loan	Summer	2009	n/a	FCK.dk
19	LB	(Costa Rica)	Oviedo	19	Non-EU	Saprissa (Costa Rica)	Transfer	Winter	2013	Undisclosed	FCK.dk

==== Out ====
No.	Pos.	Nat.	Name	Age	EU	Moving to	Type	Transfer window	Transfer fee	Source
27	DM	(Denmark)	Neestrup	21	EU	Stavanger (Norway)	Contract ended	Summer	Free	
6	DM	(Denmark)	Würtz	25	EU	AaB	Transfer	Summer	Undisclosed	AaBSport.dk
41	GK	(Australia)	Coe	25	Non-EU	Randers FC	Transfer	Summer	Undisclosed	RandersFC.dk
18	CF	(Brazil)	Júnior	33	Non-EU	Randers FC	Loan	Summer	n/a	RandersFC.dk
9	CF	(Denmark)	Nordstrand	26	EU	Groningen (Netherlands)	Loan	Summer	n/a	FCGroningen.nl
41	GK	(Norway)	Nilssen	34	EU	Start (Norway)	End of loan	Winter	n/a	FCK.dk
3	LB	(Denmark)	N. Jensen	35	EU		Contract ended	Winter	n/a	
24	RW	(Czech Republic)	Sionko	32	EU	Sparta Prague (Czech Republic)	Contract terminated	Winter	Free	FCK.dk

Last updated: 14 January

== Club ==
=== Coaching staff ===
Position	Staff
Manager	(Norway) Ståle Solbakken
Assistant manager	(Norway) Bård Wiggen
Goalkeeping coach	(Denmark) Per Wind
Fitness coach	(Denmark) Anders Storskov
Chief scout	(Denmark) Lars Højer

Last updated: 9 June
Source: F.C. Copenhagen

=== Kit ===
Supplier: Kappa
Sponsor(s): Carlsberg

Home; Domestic	Away; Domestic	Home; Europe	Away 1 Europe	Away 2 Europe

Source: FCK.dk

=== Other information ===
Chairman	(Denmark) Flemming Østergaard (until 23 April)
Chairman	(Denmark) Lars Johansen (from 23 April)
Sport director	(Denmark) Carsten V. Jensen
Ground (capacity and dimensions)	Parken (38,065 / 105x68 m)

Updated to match played 9 June
Source: F.C. Copenhagen and Parken Stadium

== Competitions ==
=== Overall ===
Competition	Started round	Current position / round	Final position / round	First match	Last match
Danish Superliga	—	—	1st	19 July	16 May
UEFA Champions League	Second qualifying round	—	Play-off round	15 July	26 August
UEFA Europa League	Group stage	—	Round of 32	17 September	25 February
Danish Cup	Third round	—	Fourth round	23 September	29 October

Updated to match played 16 May
Source: Competitions

=== Danish Superliga ===
==== Classification ====
Pos	Team	Pld	W	D	L	GF	GA	GD	Pts	Qualification or relegation
1	Copenhagen (C)	33	21	5	7	61	22	+39	68	Qualification to Champions League third qualifying round
2	OB	33	17	8	8	46	34	+12	59	Qualification to Europa League third qualifying round
3	Brøndby	33	15	7	11	57	50	+7	52	Qualification to Europa League second qualifying round
4	Esbjerg fB	33	13	11	9	48	43	+5	50	
5	AaB	33	13	9	11	36	30	+6	48	

Source: Danish Football Association (in Danish)
Rules for classification: 1) points; 2) goal difference; 3) number of goals scored.
(C) Champions

==== Results summary ====
Overall								Home						Away					
Pld	W	D	L	GF	GA	GD	Pts	W	D	L	GF	GA	GD	W	D	L	GF	GA	GD
33	21	5	7	61	22	+39	68	13	2	2	40	10	+30	8	3	5	21	12	+9

Last updated: 16 May.

==== Results by round ====
Round	1	2	3	4	5	6	7	8	9	10	11	12	13	14	15	16	17	18	19	20	21	22	23	24	25	26	27	28	29	30	31	32	33
Ground	A	H	H	A	H	A	H	A	H	A	H	A	H	A	A	H	H	A	H	H	A	H	A	H	A	A	H	A	H	A	H	A	H
Result	L	W	D	W	L	W	D	D	W	W	W	W	W	D	L	W	W	W	W	W	W	L	D	W	W	L	W	L	W	W	W	L	W

Updated to match(es) played on 16 May. Source: Competitive Matches
A = Away; H = Home; W = Win; D = Draw; L = Loss

== Matches ==
=== Competitive ===
Game	Date	Tournament	Round	Ground	Opponent	Score^{1}	TV	Report
1	15 July	UEFA Champions League	Second qualifying round	H	Mogren (Montenegro)	6–0	TV 2	Report / Report link; Kick off / 20:15 CEST; Attendance / 12,226; Referee / Selçuk Dereli; Copenhagen / Mogren; Kristensen 8'; Zanka 16'; Kristensen (yellow card) 17'; Aílton 24'; N'Doye 69'; N'Doye 74'; Nordstrand 83' / Grbić (yellow card) 19'; Božović (yellow card) 54'
2	18 July	Danish Superliga	1	A	Nordsjælland	0–2	Canal 9	Report / Report link; Kick off / 15:00 CEST; Attendance / 5,745; Referee / Lars Christoffersen; Copenhagen / Nordsjælland; / Petersen 3'; Kibebe (yellow card) 26'; Bernburg 27'; Bernburg 57'; Rasmussen (yellow card) 58'
3	22 July	UEFA Champions League	Second qualifying round	AR (Montenegro)	Mogren (Montenegro)	6–0	TV3+	Report / Report link; Kick off / CEST; Referee / Alexandru Deaconu; Copenhagen / Mogren; N'Doye 11'; Nordstrand 16'; N'Doye 40'; Vingaard 43'; Delaney 47'; Özdoğan (yellow card) 76'; Aílton 87' / Božović (yellow card) 82'
4	25 July	Danish Superliga	2	H	HB Køge (Denmark)	7–1	Canal 9	Report / Report link; Kick off / 15:00 CEST; Attendance / 14,043; Referee / Anders Hermansen; Copenhagen / HB Køge; Zanka 17'; Pospěch 26'; Aílton 48'; Santin 62'; Nordstrand 70'; N'Doye 76'; Vingaard 83' / Ake 6'; Madsen (yellow card) 51'
5	29 July	UEFA Champions League	Third qualifying round	H	Stabæk (Norway)	3–1	TV 2	Report / Report link; Kick off / 20:15 CEST; Attendance / 15,383; Referee / Yuri Baskakov; Copenhagen / Stabæk; Grønkjær 11'; Santin 41'; Santin 80' (pen.); Zanka (yellow card) 87' / Pálmason 58'
6	1 August	Danish Superliga	3	H	Silkeborg IF	1–1	Canal 9	Report / Report link; Kick off / 15:00 CEST; Attendance / 14,128; Referee / Henrik N. Kragh; Copenhagen / Silkeborg IF; Nordstrand 47' (pen.) / Bech 6'; Lustü (yellow card) 21'; Bech (yellow card) 47'; Hansen (yellow card) 75'; Holst (yellow card) 90'
7	5 August	UEFA Champions League	Third qualifying round	A (Norway)	Stabæk (Norway)	0–0	Canal 9	Report / Report link; Kick off / 20:45 CEST; Attendance / 12,562; Referee / William Collum; Copenhagen / Stabæk; Antonsson (yellow card) 62' / Farnerud (yellow card) 68'
8	9 August	Danish Superliga	4	A	SønderjyskE	1–0	Canal 9	Kick off / 16:00 CEST; Attendance / 5,454; Referee / Emil Laursen; Copenhagen / SønderjyskE; Nørregaard 41' / Egholm (yellow card) 10'
9	15 August	Danish Superliga	5	H	AGF	0–1	TV3+	Report / Report link; Kick off / 15:00 CEST; Attendance / 18,551; Referee / Claus Bo Larsen; Copenhagen / AGF; Zanka (yellow card) 50' / Thomassen (yellow card) 6'; Povlsen (yellow card) 18'; Graulund 33'; Poulsen (yellow card) 50'
10	18 August	UEFA Champions League	Play-off round	H	APOEL (Cyprus)	1–0	TV3+	Report / Report link; Kick off / 20:45 CEST; Attendance / 16,260; Referee / Alain Hamer; Copenhagen / APOEL; Pospěch 54' / Haxhi (yellow card) 61'; Grnčarov (yellow card) 61'; Haxhi (yellow card) 90' (red card)
11	22 August	Danish Superliga	6	A	Midtjylland	4–1	TV3+	Report / Report link; Kick off / 15:00 CEST; Attendance / 9,250; Referee / Michael Svendsen; Copenhagen / Midtjylland; Olsen 20'; Thygesen (yellow card) 57' / Zanka 7'; N'Doye 20'; N'Doye (yellow card) 70'; Vingaard 73'; Kvist 85'
12	26 August	UEFA Champions League	Play-off round	A (Cyprus)	APOEL (Cyprus)	1–3	TV3+	Report / Report link; Kick off / 21:45 EEST; Attendance / 21,133; Referee / Konrad Plautz; Copenhagen / APOEL; Hutchinson (yellow card) 18'; N'Doye 22'; Nordstrand (yellow card) 83' / Kosowski 2'; Michael 18' (pen.); Michael 42'; Alexandrou (yellow card) 86'; Pinto (yellow card) 88'
13	30 August	Danish Superliga	7	H	Brøndby	1–1	TV3+	Report / Report link; Kick off / 18:00 CEST; Attendance / 30,100; Referee / Peter Rasmussen; Copenhagen / Brøndby; Aílton 41'; Vingaard (yellow card) 90'; Zanka (yellow card) 90' / Bischoff (yellow card) 6'; Holmén (yellow card) 12'; Duncan 51'; Duncan (yellow card) 90'
14	12 September	Danish Superliga	8	A	OB	1–1	Canal 9	Report / Report link; Kick off / 15:00 CEST; Attendance / 12,701; Referee / Lars Christoffersen; Copenhagen / OB; Vingaard 38' (pen.); Nørregaard (yellow card) 47' / Sørensen (yellow card) 37'; Utaka 45'
15	17 September	UEFA Europa League	Group stage	A (Romania)	CFR Cluj (Romania)	0–2	TV3+	Report / Report link; Kick off / 22:05 EEST; Referee / Alexey Kulbakov; Copenhagen / CFR Cluj; Kvist (yellow card) 50'; Kristensen (yellow card) 74' / Culio 53'; Mureşan (yellow card) 67'; Traoré 75'
16	20 September	Danish Superliga	9	H	Randers FC	3–0	TV3+	Report / Report link; Kick off / 18:00 CEST; Attendance / 17,372; Referee / Michael Johansen; Copenhagen / Randers FC; Pospěch 24'; Pospěch 61'; Delaney (yellow card) 84'; Vingaard 90' / Arzumanyan (yellow card) 28'; Addy (yellow card) 79'
17	23 September	Danish Cup	Third round	A	Elite 3000 (Denmark)	2–1	Kanal 5	Report / Report link; Kick off / 18:00 CEST; Attendance / 3,038; Referee / Anders Hermansen; Copenhagen / Elite 3000; N'Doye 4'; Aílton 76'; Sionko (yellow card) 90' / Rohrberg 69'; Sørensen (yellow card) 87'
18	27 September	Danish Superliga	10	A	AaB	2–1	TV3+	Report / Report link; Kick off / 18:00 CEST; Attendance / 10,561; Referee / Thomas Vejlgaard; Copenhagen / AaB; Grønkjær (yellow card) 59'; Hutchinson 71'; Hutchinson (yellow card) 75'; Hutchinson 81' / Holm 33'; Wæhler (yellow card) 77'; Due (yellow card) 90'
19	1 October	UEFA Europa League	Group stage	H	Sparta Prague (Czech Republic)	1–0	TV3+	Report / Report link; Kick off / 19:00 CEST; Attendance / 15,043; Referee / Hannes Kaasik; Copenhagen / Sparta Prague; N'Doye 25' / Kušnír (yellow card) 32'
20	4 October	Danish Superliga	11	H	Esbjerg fB	2–1	Canal 9	Report / Report link; Kick off / 16:00 CEST; Attendance / 20,292; Referee / Nicolai Vollquartz; Copenhagen / Esbjerg fB; Santin 6' (pen.); Larsson (yellow card) 32'; Wendt 61' / Winde (red card) 4'; Rieks 74'
21	18 October	Danish Superliga	12	A	HB Køge (Denmark)	2–0	Canal 9	Report / Report link; Kick off / 16:00 CEST; Attendance / 5,079; Referee / Peter Rasmussen; Copenhagen / HB Køge; Antonsson 22'; Grønkjær 30'; Hutchinson (yellow card) 89' / Nielsen (yellow card) 44'; Andersen (yellow card) 72'
22	22 October	UEFA Europa League	Group stage	A (Netherlands)	PSV (Netherlands)	0–1	TV3+	Report / Report link; Kick off / 19:00 CEST; Referee / Alan Kelly; Copenhagen / PSV; Antonsson (yellow card) 32'; Grønkjær (yellow card) 50'; Pospěch (yellow card) 83' / Simons (yellow card) 52'; Reis 72'; Manolev (yellow card) 80'
23	25 October	Danish Superliga	13	H	Silkeborg IF	1–0	Canal 9	Report / Report link; Kick off / 16:00 CET; Attendance / 18,383; Referee / Thomas Vejlgaard; Copenhagen / Silkeborg IF; Santin 68' / Lustü (yellow card) 72'
24	29 October	Danish Cup	Fourth round	A	SønderjyskE	0–5	Kanal 5	Report / Report link; Kick off / 18:00 CET; Attendance / 1,051; Referee / Claus Bo Larsen; Copenhagen / SønderjyskE; / Thomsen 30'; Jessen 37'; Hansen 42'; Ottesen (yellow card) 46'; Agger 62'; Frederiksen 90'
25	1 November	Danish Superliga	14	A	Esbjerg fB	0–0	TV3+	Report / Report link; Kick off / 18:00 CET; Attendance / 11,571; Referee / Michael Svendsen
26	5 November	UEFA Europa League	Group stage	H	PSV (Netherlands)	1–1	TV3 Puls	Report / Report link; Kick off / 21:05 CET; Attendance / 21,605; Referee / Vladimir Hrinak; Copenhagen / PSV; N'Doye (yellow card) 7'; Grønkjær 39' (pen.) / Pieters (yellow card) 39'; Engelaar (yellow card) 47'; Dzsudzsák
27	8 November	Danish Superliga	15	A	AaB	0–1	TV3+	Report / Report link; Kick off / 18:00 CET; Attendance / 7,898; Referee / Claus Bo Larsen; Copenhagen / AaB; / Bøgelund (yellow card) 47'; Tracy 58'; Wæhler (yellow card) 74'
28	22 November	Danish Superliga	16	H	Randers FC	2–0	DR1	Report / Report link; Kick off / 16:00 CET; Attendance / 12,046; Referee / Nicolai Vollquartz; Copenhagen / Randers FC; Aílton 1'; Aílton 49' / Beckmann (yellow card) 35'; Hansen (yellow card) 89'
29	29 November	Danish Superliga	17	H	Midtjylland	2–0	Canal 9	Report / Report link; Kick off / 16:00 CET; Attendance / 13,927; Referee / Lars Christoffersen; Copenhagen / Midtjylland; Hutchinson 5'; Hutchinson (yellow card) 32'; Aílton (yellow card) 41'; N'Doye 88' / Reid (yellow card) 19'; Florescu (yellow card) 31'; Ipša (yellow card) 86'
30	3 December	UEFA Europa League	Group stage	H	CFR Cluj (Romania)	2–0	TV3 Puls	Report / Report link; Kick off / 19:00 CET; Attendance / 11,567; Referee / Darko Ceferin; Copenhagen / CFR Cluj; Vingaard 37'; N'Doye 43' / Cadú (yellow card) 42'; Dani (yellow card) 51'
31	6 December	Danish Superliga	18	A	OB	2–0	TV3+	Report / Report link; Kick off / 18:00 CET; Attendance / 14,569; Referee / Michael Svendsen; Copenhagen / OB; N'Doye 42'; N'Doye (yellow card) 59'; N'Doye 76' / Ruud (yellow card) 31'
32	16 December	UEFA Europa League	Group stage	A (Czech Republic)	Sparta Prague (Czech Republic)	3–0	TV3 Puls	Report / Report link; Kick off / 21:05 CET; Attendance / 17,151; Referee / Sascha Kever; Copenhagen / Sparta Prague; N'Doye 22'; N'Doye 30'; Grønkjær 54' (pen.); N'Doye (yellow card) 65' / Kušnír (yellow card) 25'; Pamić (yellow card) 42'; Kucka (yellow card) 55'; Pamić (yellow card) 59' (yellow-red card)
33	18 February	UEFA Europa League	Round of 32	H	Marseille (France)	1–3	TV3 Puls	Report / Report link; Kick off / 21:05 CET; Attendance / 20,334; Referee / Carlos Velasco Carballo; Copenhagen / Marseille; Nørregaard (yellow card) 63'; Grønkjær 79' (pen.) / Diawara (yellow card) 23'; Niang 72'; Niang (yellow card) 78'; Mbia (yellow card) 81'; Ben Arfa 84'; Kaboré 90'
34	25 February	UEFA Europa League	Round of 32	A (France)	Marseille (France)	1–3	TV3 Puls	Report / Report link; Kick off / 19:05 CET; Attendance / 27,195; Referee / Cüneyt Çakır; Copenhagen / Marseille; Aílton 86' / Ben Arfa 43'; Koné 62'; Koné 78'
35	7 March	Danish Superliga	19	H	AGF	5–0	TV3+	Report / Report link; Kick off / 18:00 CET; Attendance / 17,946; Referee / Lars Christoffersen; Copenhagen / AGF; Santin 3' (pen.); Santin 21'; Santin 40'; Vingaard 45'; Zanka 60' / Gjesing (yellow card) 57'; Petersen (yellow card) 64'
36	14 March	Danish Superliga	20	H	Brøndby	2–0	TV3+	Report / Report link; Kick off / 18:00 CET; Attendance / 30,191; Referee / Claus Bo Larsen; Copenhagen / Brøndby; Vingaard 70'; Kvist 90'
37	21 March	Danish Superliga	21	A	SønderjyskE	2–0	TV3+	Report / Report link; Kick off / 18:00 CET; Attendance / 4,317; Referee / Peter Rasmussen; Copenhagen / SønderjyskE; Wendt (yellow card) 17'; Santin 47'; Østli 87' (o.g.) / Skúlason (yellow card) 78'
38	24 March	Danish Superliga	22	H	Nordsjælland	0–2	TV3+	Report / Report link; Kick off / 20:00 CET; Attendance / 14,197; Referee / Anders Hermansen; Copenhagen / Nordsjælland; / Bernier 54'; Bille 60'; Bernier (yellow card) 72'
39	28 March	Danish Superliga	23	A	AGF	0–0	TV3+	Report / Report link; Kick off / 18:00 CEST; Attendance / 9,893; Referee / Nicolai Vollquartz; Copenhagen / AGF; Nørregaard (yellow card) 38'; Wendt (yellow card) 73' / Petersen (yellow card) 6'; Kure (yellow card) 24'
40	1 April	Danish Superliga	24	H	OB	2–0	TV3+	Report / Report link; Kick off / 18:00 CEST; Attendance / 24,076; Referee / Thomas Vejlgaard; Copenhagen / OB; N'Doye 11'; Grønkjær 76' / Demba-Nyrén (yellow card) 83'; Christensen (yellow card) 88'
41	5 April	Danish Superliga	25	A	Nordsjælland	3–0	Canal 9	Report / Report link; Kick off / 16:00 CEST; Attendance / 7,022; Referee / Peter Rasmussen; Copenhagen / Nordsjælland; Pospěch 26'; Wendt 56'; Santin 71'
42	11 April	Danish Superliga	26	A	Randers FC	0–1	Canal 9	Report / Report link; Kick off / 16:00 CEST; Attendance / 7,612; Referee / Emil Laursen; Copenhagen / Randers FC; Grønkjær (yellow card) 73' / Beckmann 35'
43	14 April	Danish Superliga	27	H	Esbjerg fB	3–2	TV3+	Report / Report link; Kick off / 20:00 CEST; Attendance / 15,247; Referee / Peter Rasmussen; Copenhagen / Esbjerg fB; Nørregaard 7'; Santin 54'; N'Doye 59' / Vendelboe 63'; Jørgensen (yellow card) 72'; Janssen 82'
44	17 April	Danish Superliga	28	A	Midtjylland	2–3	TV3+	Report / Report link; Kick off / 17:00 CEST; Attendance / 9,669; Referee / Henrik N. Kragh; Copenhagen / Midtjylland; Santin (yellow card) 25'; Vingaard (yellow card) 40'; N'Doye 55'; Wiland (red card) 63'; N'Doye 73'; Kvist (yellow card) 90' / Borring 7'; Ilsø 13'; Thygesen (yellow card) 72'; Borring 90'
45	25 April	Danish Superliga	29	H	AaB	2–0	Canal 9	Report / Report link; Kick off / 16:00 CEST; Attendance / 22,112; Referee / Michael Svendsen; Copenhagen / AaB; Santin 23' (pen.); Pospěch 37' / Zaza (yellow card) 23'
46	2 May	Danish Superliga	30	A	Brøndby	2–0	TV3+	Report / Report link; Kick off / 18:00 CEST; Attendance / 22,795; Referee / Lars Christoffersen; Copenhagen / Brøndby; Zanka 40'; N'Doye 68' / Kristiansen (yellow card) 90'
47	5 May	Danish Superliga	31	H	HB Køge (Denmark)	4–0	TV3+	Report / Report link; Kick off / 20:00 CEST; Attendance / 20,096; Referee / Peter Rasmussen; Copenhagen / HB Køge; N'Doye 17'; N'Doye 42'; Pospěch 83'; Nørregaard 90' / Christensen (yellow card) 24'; Sørensen (yellow card) 77'
48	9 May	Danish Superliga	32	A	Silkeborg IF	0–2	TV3+	Report / Report link; Kick off / 15:00 CEST; Attendance / 5,010; Referee / Henning Jensen; Copenhagen / Silkeborg IF; / Lekic 25'; Pedersen (yellow card) 38'; Degn (yellow card) 41'; Holst 89'
49	16 May	Danish Superliga	33	H	SønderjyskE	3–1	TV3+	Report / Report link; Kick off / 15:00 CEST; Attendance / 26,043; Referee / Nicolai Vollquartz; Copenhagen / SønderjyskE; N'Doye 34'; Grønkjær (yellow card) 44'; Santin 49'; N'Doye 52' / Fabricius 22'

Last updated: 16 May
Source: FCK.dk
^{1}F.C. Copenhagen goals come first.
National flags for Ground and Opponent columns are only shown when different from that of F.C. Copenhagen.
M = Match; Ground: H = Home, A = Away, N = Neutral, HR = Home replacement, AR = Away replacement.

=== Friendlies ===
Match	Date	Competition or tour	Ground	Opponent	Score^{1}	Scorers	GD
1	27 June	Anniversary match	A	Skovshoved IF	9 - 1	N'Doye 38'; N'Doye 42'; N'Doye 44'; Aílton 60'; Aílton 62'; Nordstrand 65'; Christiansen 73' (pen.); Nordstrand 80'; Grønkjær 85'	8
2^{2}	3 July	Thermenland Cup	AR (Austria)	Sturm Graz (Austria)	10 - 9	Aílton 7'; Santin 53' (pen.)	1
3	7 July	Thermenland Cup	AR (Austria)	Rapid Wien (Austria)	1 - 2	Aílton 42'	-1
4	11 July	—	HR	Vejle B	3 - 0	N'Doye 70'; Nordstrand 76'; D. Jensen 83'	3
5	27 January	—	HR	AB (Denmark)	4 - 0	Aílton 2'; Özdoğan 41'; Pospěch 57'; Zohore 81'	4
6	3 February	Copa del Sol	N (Spain)	Kalmar FF (Sweden)	2 - 1	Vingaard 39'; Santin 76'	1
7	5 February	Copa del Sol	N (Spain)	Shakhtar Donetsk (Ukraine)	1 - 1	Vingaard 8'	0
8	8 February	Copa del Sol	N (Spain)	Molde (Norway)	2 - 0	Zanka 16'; Santin 70'	2
9	12 February	Copa del Sol	N (Spain)	OB	2 - 1	N'Doye 15'; Vingaard 67'	1
10	20 February	—	HR	Vålerenga (Norway)	1 - 2	Zohore 20'	-1
11	27 February	—	HR	Helsingborgs IF (Sweden)	0 - 3		-3

Last updated: 20 February
Source: F.C. Copenhagen
^{1}F.C. Copenhagen goals come first.
Country's flag depict country of foreign team to that of F.C. Copenhagen.
^{2}After penalty shootout
Ground: H = Home; A = Away; N = Neutral; HR = Home replacement; AR = Away replacement; GD = Goal difference
