= TV3 Max =

- Country: Denmark
- Broadcast area: Denmark
- Network: TV3
- Headquarters: Copenhagen, Denmark

Programming
- Language(s): Danish

Ownership
- Owner: Viaplay Group / Viasat Danmark
- Sister channels: TV3, TV3+, TV3 Puls, TV3 Sport, See

History
- Launched: 31 October 2017; 7 years ago
- Replaced: TV3 Sport 2

Availability

Terrestrial
- Boxer: Channel 403

TV3 MAX is a Danish TV channel dedicated to male viewers. The channel launched on 31 October 2017 and replaced TV3 Sport 2. The channel is owned by Viaplay Group.

== Programming ==
TV3 MAX broadcasts sports like the Danish Superliga, Premier League, La Liga, UEFA Champions League, ATP tennis and motorsport as well as series like Top Gear, The Simpsons and How I Met Your Mother.
