= TV3 Sport =

TV3 SPORT
- Broadcast area: Denmark

Ownership
- Owner: Viaplay Group
- Sister channels: TV3, TV3+, TV3 Puls, TV3 MAX, See

History
- Launched: 7 January 2013; 13 years ago
- Replaced: Sportskanalen
- Former names: TV3 Sport 1

Links
- Website: tv3sport.dk

Availability

Terrestrial
- Boxer: -

TV3 Sport is a Danish sports television channel, owned by Viaplay Group and operated by TV3 SPORT. The channel originally broadcast as TV 2 SPORT and was a joint-venture between TV 2 and Modern Times Group.

MTG launched a dedicated Danish version of its Viasat Sport channel in January 2002. In December 2006, TV 2 and MTG announced that they would enter a partnership to launch TV 2 SPORT and its sister channel TV 2 SPORT Xtra (later renamed TV 2 SPORT HD). This channel would replace the Danish version of Viasat Sport 1 (as it was then called). It would also mean that Viasat Sport 2 and 3 would disappear from cable television and TV 2's second channel TV 2 Zulu would broadcast less sport.

The original launch of TV 2 SPORT was set to 1 March 2007, but the launch had to be postponed since an investigation by the Danish Competition Authority caused a delay. The Competition Authority gave its permission to the establishment of TV 2 SPORT on 11 April 2007, and later that day the channel began broadcasting.

On 8 October 2012, it was announced that MTG would buy TV 2's share of TV 2 SPORT, however the deal did not go through until 19 December 2012 when the Competition Authority approved the deal, on the condition that MTG would abide by certain rules until major football TV rights (Danish Superliga, UEFA Champions League) are renegotiated in 2015.

On 7 January 2013, TV3 SPORT 1 began broadcasting and it was announced that an additional channel, TV3 SPORT 2, would be launched on 5 February 2013.

On 31 October 2017, the sister channel TV3 Sport 2 renamed as TV3 Max, and the first channel removed the number 1.
