= 2009–10 AS Douanes season =

AS Douanes
2009–10 season
- Stadium: Stade Demba Diop
- Ligue 1: Champion

The 2009–10 ASC Douanes season were in the top division of Senegalese football. They would be placed third in Group A with 23 points, 5 wins and 13 goals. The goal totals were shared with ASC Port Autonome.

The highest goals scored was ASC HLM with 1–3.

== Ligue 1 ==
ASC Diaraf participate in Group A during the 2009–10 season.

Pos	Team	Pld	W	D	L	GF	GA	GD	Pts
2	ASC HLM	16	7	5	4	16	14	+2	26
3	AS Douanes	16	5	8	3	13	12	+1	23
4	Dakar UC	16	5	8	3	15	10	+5	23

Match dates not available AS Douanes participated in Group A during the 2009–10 season.

Home matches:

- AS Douanes - ASC Linguère 1-0
- AS Douanes - CSS Richard-Toll 0-0
- AS Douanes - ASC Port Autonome 1-2
- AS Douanes - ASC HLM 1-3
- AS Douanes - Stade de Mbour 1-0
- AS Douanes - NGB ASC Niarry-Tally 0-2
- AS Douanes - ASC Jeanne d'Arc 2-0
- AS Douanes - Dakar UC 1-1

Away matches:

- ASC Linguère - AS Douanes 0-1
- CSS Richard-Toll - AS Douanes 1-1
- ASC Port Autonome - AS Douanes 1-1
- ASC HLM - AS Douanes 1-1
- Stade de Mbour - AS Douanes 1-1
- NGB ASC Niarry-Tally - AS Douanes 0-1
- ASC Jeanne d'Arc - AS Douanes 0-0
- Dakar US - AS Douanes 0-0

== League Cup (Coupe de la Ligue) ==
Douanes appeared in their second League Cup, the first-round match went into extra time without any goals scored and the club lost to Olympique de Ngor 5–6 in penalty kicks.

Round	Opponents	H/A	Result F–A	Scorers
First Round	Olympique de Ngor	H	0-0 (5-6 p)	

== Squad ==
Note: Flags indicate national team as defined under FIFA eligibility rules; some limited exceptions apply. Players may hold more than one non-FIFA nationality.

No.	Pos.	Nation	Player
—	GK	SEN	Makhtar Deme
—	GK	SEN	Issa Ndiaye
—	DF	CPV	Vincent Mendez
—	DF	SEN	Bacary Coly
—	DF	SEN	Sidy N'Diaye
—	DF	SEN	Alkany Fané
—	DF	SEN	Pape Biaye
—	DF	SEN	Abdou Diop
—	DF	SEN	Mamadou Ballo DIallo
—	DF	SEN	Babacar Ndiour
—	DF	SEN	Gourgui O. Diagne
—	MF	SEN	Baye Demba Mbengue
—	MF	SEN	Benoît Toupane
—	MF		Bruce Gomis

No.	Pos.	Nation	Player
—	MF	SEN	Ibrahima Faye
—	MF	SEN	Kisme Goundiam
—	MF	SEN	Karamba Diallo
—	MF	SEN	Mamadou Ndoye
—	MF	SEN	Ousmane Sarr
—	MF	SEN	Aboubacryne Sall
—	FW	SEN	Salif Keita
—	FW	SEN	El Hadji Adama Mbaye
—	FW	SEN	Diabe Goundiam
—	FW	SEN	Sado Diao
—	FW	SEN	Pape Babacar Diagne
—	FW	SEN	El Hadji Yaya Sonko
—	FW	SEN	Abdoulaye Sené

== Team kit ==
Home
