= Jonas Henriksen =

Jonas Henriksen may refer to:

- Jonas Henriksen (footballer)
- Jonas Henriksen (cricketer)
