= Dame N'Doye =

Senegalese footballer (born 1985)

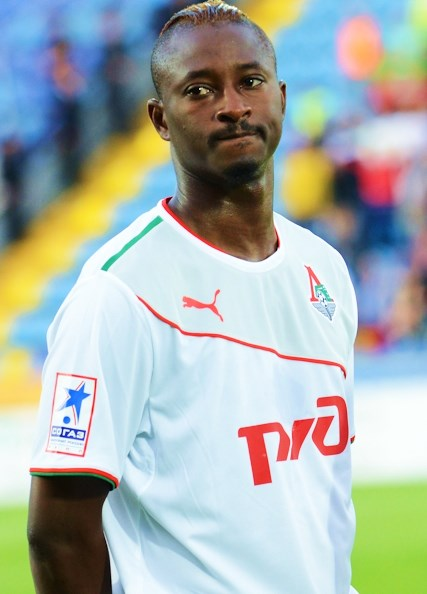
- N'Doye with Lokomotiv in 2014

Personal information
- Full name: Dame N'Doye
- Date of birth: 21 February 1985 (age 41)
- Place of birth: Thiès, Senegal
- Height: 1.85 m (6 ft 1 in)
- Position: Forward

Senior career*
Years	Team	Apps	(Gls)
2003–2006	Jeanne d'Arc		
2006	Al-Sadd	?	(0)
2006–2007	Académica	25	(4)
2007–2008	Panathinaikos	23	(3)
2008–2009	OFI	15	(7)
2009–2012	Copenhagen	104	(59)
2012–2015	Lokomotiv Moscow	66	(27)
2015	Hull City	15	(5)
2015–2018	Trabzonspor	63	(10)
2016	→ Sunderland (loan)	11	(1)
2018–2020	Copenhagen	47	(31)
Total		369	(147)

International career
2010–2015	Senegal	28	(7)
- * Club domestic league appearances and goals

Dame N'Doye (born 21 February 1985) is a Senegalese former professional footballer who played as a forward.

He spent the better part of his career with Copenhagen, serving two spells at the club and becoming its all-time topscorer in 2018. He also represented teams in Qatar, Portugal, Greece, Russia, England and Turkey.

N'Doye won his first cap for Senegal in 2010, and played for the country in two Africa Cup of Nations tournaments.

== Club career ==
=== Early years ===
Born in Thiès, N'Doye began his career with ASC Jeanne d'Arc. In 2006, he signed for Al Sadd SC in the Qatar Stars League.

N'Doye arrived in Europe in the summer of 2006, joining Académica de Coimbra. From 2007 to 2009, he competed in the Super League Greece, with Panathinaikos F.C. and OFI.

=== Copenhagen ===
On 12 January 2009, N'Doye moved to Danish Superliga club F.C. Copenhagen. He scored his first goal on 7 March 2009, helping to a 3–0 away win over Randers FC, and finished his first full season with 14 goals, as the club renewed its domestic supremacy.

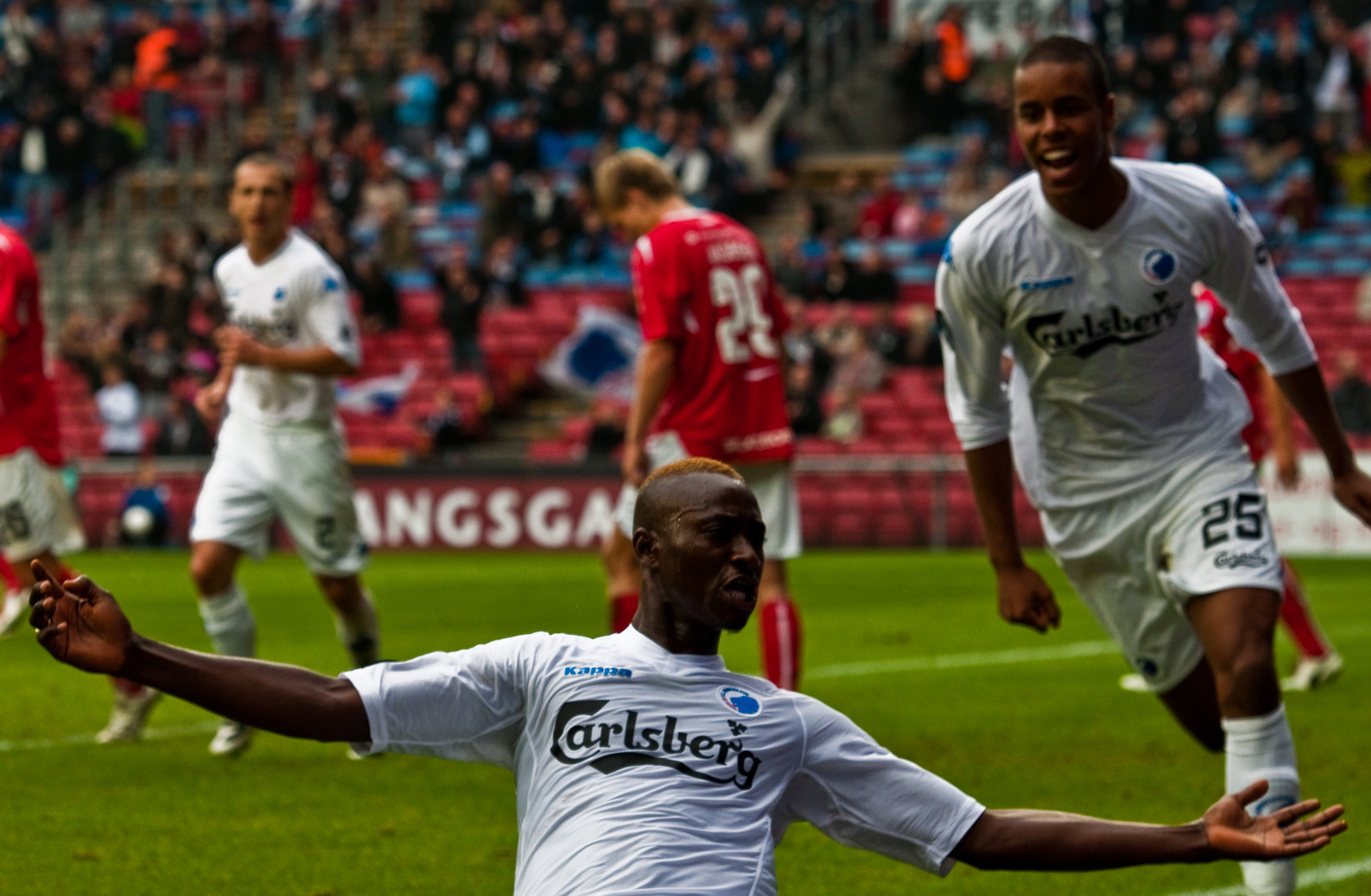
N'Doye celebrating a goal for FC Copenhagen in 2010

On 4 August 2010, N'Doye netted the 3–2 winner (also the aggregate score) in the 59th minute of the playoff round of the UEFA Champions League against FC BATE Borisov. In the group stage, he helped his team become the first ever in the country to reach the knockout stages with goals against FC Rubin Kazan (1–0, home) and Panathinaikos (2–0 in Athens).

=== Lokomotiv Moscow ===
In the summer of 2012, N'Doye signed with Russian Premier League side FC Lokomotiv Moscow for an undisclosed fee. He quickly became first-choice, scoring seven times in the first half of the campaign; in November 2012, he won a web poll conducted by club fans to be elected player of the month, repeating the feat in October of the following year.

=== Hull City ===
On 2 February 2015, transfer deadline day, N'Doye agreed to a two-and-a-half-year contract with Hull City for an undisclosed fee. He made his Premier League debut five days later, coming on as a 76th-minute substitute for Gastón Ramírez in a 1–1 draw at Manchester City. His first start occurred the following matchday, where he scored the second goal in a 2–0 home defeat of Aston Villa.

=== Trabzonspor ===
On 10 August 2015, N'Doye moved to Trabzonspor for £2.2 million. In the following January transfer window he moved clubs and countries again, joining Sunderland until the end of the season. He scored his first goal for the latter on 1 March, converting through a deflected shot to put the hosts ahead in an eventual 2–2 home draw against Crystal Palace.

=== Return to Copenhagen ===
On 2 July 2018, free agent N'Doye returned to F.C. Copenhagen on a one-year deal. Twenty seven days later, in a match against Aalborg Boldspilklub at Parken Stadium that finished 4–0, he scored a hat-trick in just 15 minutes. As a result, he became the club's all-time top scorer, after surpassing César Santin.

N'Doye left in the summer of 2020 as his contract, renewed in January 2019, expired.

== International career ==
N'Doye made his debut for Senegal on 17 November 2010, in a 2–1 friendly win against Gabon. He was part of the squad that competed in the 2012 Africa Cup of Nations, scoring as a substitute in a 2–1 loss to Zambia in an eventual group stage exit.

== Personal life ==
N'Doye's older brother, Ousmane, was also an international footballer.

== Career statistics ==
=== Club ===
Appearances and goals by club, season and competition
Club	Season	League			National cup (Note: Includes Taça de Portugal, Greek Football Cup, Danish Cup, Russian Cup, Turkish Cup)		Europe		Total	
Club	Season	Division	Apps	Goals	Apps	Goals	Apps	Goals	Apps	Goals
Académica	2006–07	Primeira Liga	25	4	4	2	–		29	6
Panathinaikos	2007–08	Super League Greece	23	3	2	1	7 (Note: Appearances in UEFA Cup)	2	32	6
OFI	2008–09	Super League Greece	15	7	0	0	–		15	7
Copenhagen	2008–09	Danish Superliga	11	2	3	3	2	0	16	5
Copenhagen	2009–10	Danish Superliga	32	14	2	1	13 (Note: Five appearances and five goals in UEFA Champions League, eight appearances and four goals in UEFA Europa League)	9	47	24
Copenhagen	2010–11	Danish Superliga	31	25	4	4	12 (Note: Appearances in UEFA Champions League)	7	47	36
Copenhagen	2011–12	Danish Superliga	30	18	5	4	9 (Note: Three appearances and one goal in UEFA Champions League, six appearances and three goals in UEFA Europa League)	4	44	26
Copenhagen	Total		104	59	14	12	36	20	154	91
Lokomotiv Moscow	2012–13	Russian Premier League	25	10	1	0	0	0	26	10
Lokomotiv Moscow	2013–14	Russian Premier League	27	13	0	0	0	0	27	13
Lokomotiv Moscow	2014–15	Russian Premier League	14	4	0	0	1 (Note: Appearance(s) in UEFA Europa League)	0	15	4
Lokomotiv Moscow	Total		66	27	1	0	1	0	68	27
Hull City	2014–15	Premier League	15	5	0	0	–		15	5
Trabzonspor	2015–16	Süper Lig	12	0	2	1	–		14	1
Trabzonspor	2016–17	Süper Lig	27	5	5	3	–		32	8
Trabzonspor	2017–18	Süper Lig	24	5	2	2	–		26	7
Trabzonspor	Total		63	10	9	6	–		72	16
Sunderland (loan)	2015–16	Premier League	11	1	0	0	–		11	1
Copenhagen	2018–19	Danish Superliga	33	22	0	0	13	2	46	24
Copenhagen	2019–20	Danish Superliga	14	9	0	0	6 (Note: Three appearances and one goal in UEFA Champions League, three appearances and two goals in UEFA Europa League)	3	20	12
Copenhagen	Total		47	31	0	0	19	5	66	36
Career total			369	147	30	21	61	25	460	193

=== International ===
Scores and results list Senegal's goal tally first, score column indicates score after each N'Doye goal.

List of international goals scored by Dame N'Doye
No.	Date	Venue	Opponent	Score	Result	Competition
1	9 February 2011	Léopold Sédar Senghor, Dakar, Senegal	Guinea	3–0	3–0	Friendly
2	9 October 2011	Anjalay, Belle Vue Maurel, Mauritius	Mauritius	1–0	2–0	2012 Africa Cup of Nations qualification
3	21 January 2012	Estadio de Bata, Bata, Equatorial Guinea	Zambia	1–2	1–2	2012 Africa Cup of Nations
4	2 June 2012	Léopold Sédar Senghor, Dakar, Senegal	Liberia	2–1	3–1	2014 World Cup qualification
5	8 September 2012	Félix Houphouët-Boigny, Abidjan, Ivory Coast	Ivory Coast	1–0	2–4	2013 Africa Cup of Nations qualification
6	10 September 2014	National Stadium, Gaborone, Botswana	Botswana	2–0	2–0	2015 Africa Cup of Nations qualification
7	13 January 2015	Larbi Benbarek, Casablanca, Morocco	Guinea	1–0	5–2	Friendly

== Honours ==
Copenhagen

- Danish Superliga: 2008–09, 2009–10, 2010–11, 2018–19
- Danish Cup: 2008–09, 2011–12

Individual

- Danish Superliga Player of the Year: 2010–11
- Danish Superliga top scorer: 2010–11, 2011–12
- List of 33 top players of the Russian Premier League: 2013–14
