= Jesper Grønkjær =

Danish footballer (born 1977)

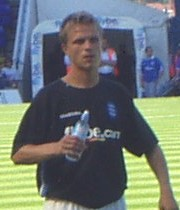
- Grønkjær with Birmingham City in 2004

Personal information
- Date of birth: 12 August 1977 (age 49)
- Place of birth: Nuuk, Greenland
- Height: 1.87 m (6 ft 2 in)
- Positions: Winger; second striker

Youth career
- Thisted

Senior career*
Years	Team	Apps	(Gls)
1995–1998	AaB	86	(10)
1998–2000	Ajax	55	(12)
2000–2004	Chelsea	88	(7)
2004–2005	Birmingham City	16	(0)
2005	Atlético Madrid	16	(0)
2005–2006	VfB Stuttgart	25	(0)
2006–2011	Copenhagen	114	(16)
Total		400	(45)

International career
1993	Denmark U-16	2	(2)
1992–1994	Denmark U-17	19	(13)
1994–1997	Denmark U-19	19	(7)
1996–1999	Denmark U-21	24	(4)
1999–2010	Denmark	80	(5)
- * Club domestic league appearances and goals

Jesper Grønkjær (Danish pronunciation: [ˈjespɐ ˈkʁɶnˌkʰeˀɐ̯]; born 12 August 1977) is a Danish former professional footballer, who most recently worked as a pundit for Scandinavian media network Viaplay.

A pacey winger, Grønkjær played primarily on the right or left wing, or as a second striker. He played a total 400 league games for a number of European clubs, most notably winning the 1999 Dutch Cup with Ajax and playing more than 100 games for English club Chelsea. Grønkjær ended his career with Copenhagen, winning four Danish Superliga titles with the club.

Grønkjær was capped 80 times for the Denmark national team from 1999 to 2010, scoring five goals. He played for his country at the World Cup in 2002 and 2010, as well as two European Championship tournaments. He was named 1995 Danish Under-19 Player of the Year.

== Club career ==
=== AaB ===
Raised in Thisted, Grønkjær started his career with local team Thisted. Earlier in his career he was told that he could have been a sprinter. He moved on to defending Danish Superliga champions AaB in 1995. He played almost 100 matches for the club, including games in the European 1995–96 UEFA Champions League tournament. He attracted the attention of a string of European top clubs.

=== Ajax ===
AaB sold Grønkjær in a £3.5 million transfer deal with Dutch club Ajax in October 1997, with Grønkjær moving to Amsterdam in July 1998. At Ajax, he was coached by fellow Dane Morten Olsen, and played alongside Danish international Ole Tobiasen. With Ajax, he won the 1998–99 KNVB Cup and he was named "Ajax Player of the Year" by the fans in 1999–2000 again finding himself pursued by a host of top teams.

=== Chelsea ===
In October 2000, Grønkjær joined Premier League club Chelsea for £7.8 million, which made him the then most expensive Danish football player. However, he was still sidelined with an injury until January 2001. His career at Chelsea lasted for four years although his form during that time was somewhat inconsistent. At his best he was a constant threat; creating and scoring some very important goals for the club. In Chelsea's fourth round FA Cup match away to Gillingham on 28 January 2001, Grønkjær started his first match for the club and scored two goals and hit the post twice, as Chelsea won 4–2.

His most notable Chelsea performance came against Liverpool on the final day of the 2002–03 season, assisting with the first goal and scoring the second at Stamford Bridge to give Chelsea a 2–1 victory and fourth place in the league, which allowed the club to qualify for the upcoming 2003–04 UEFA Champions League tournament. The importance of this result cannot be overstated, as qualification for the Champions League was considered essential to Roman Abramovich's impending takeover of the club, which was at the time in some financial difficulty. For this reason, it is often referred to as the "billion pound goal." Talking about the match in February 2011, Grønkjær said "I remember the goal very well. I was on the right wing when we got a throw-in, but instead of passing I cut in from the right and beat three or four defenders before sticking it in the other corner. It was a nice feeling, and a good reward for a great season."

In the 2003–04 UEFA Champions League quarter-final second leg away at Highbury, Grønkjær came on for Scott Parker in the second half, with Arsenal leading 1–0 on the night and 2–1 on aggregate. Within six minutes of the substitution, Chelsea equalized through a goal by Frank Lampard. As Wayne Bridge scored three minutes before the final whistle, Chelsea went on to defeat Arsenal 3–2 on aggregate and book a place in the semi-finals. In the following semi-final against Monaco, he scored from outside the penalty area with a cross-come-shot, but it was not enough for Chelsea to reach the final, as the club was defeated 5–3 on aggregate by Monaco.

Grønkjær also scored a strike in front of 67,000 fans at Old Trafford against Manchester United in the penultimate game of the 2003–04 season, the second of a three-game scoring streak. His final goal scored for Chelsea came the following week against Leeds United, where he scored the winner with a header in the first half.

=== Three clubs in two years ===
Chelsea had fired manager Claudio Ranieri before UEFA Euro 2004, and Grønkjær signed for Birmingham City for £2.2 million in July 2004. He had a poor start with Birmingham; manager Steve Bruce attributed this to difficulty adapting to playing in a struggling team, as "he is used to his team dominating the opposition and he is used to the ball more often". He scored only once, against Lincoln City in the Football League Cup. He was transferred to Atlético Madrid in December 2004, for a fee of around €2 million. Grønkjær struggled to settle in Spain and, following putting in a transfer request, made a reported €6 million move to Bundesliga club VfB Stuttgart in the summer of 2005, where the club was building a formidable squad under manager Giovanni Trapattoni and Grønkjær would play alongside fellow Dane Jon Dahl Tomasson.

Despite the hype and expectations at the start of the season, the club struggled in mid-table. At the beginning of February 2006, Grønkjær and Tomasson openly criticised Trapattoni as "lacking the will to attack and win." The criticism came after 12 drawn games out of 20, and although Trapattoni wanted to assert his authority and benched both players in the next game, he himself was fired the very next day, on 9 February 2006. Rumours in the German and Danish media suggested that Grønkjær would leave Stuttgart in favour of Danish club Copenhagen.

=== Copenhagen ===
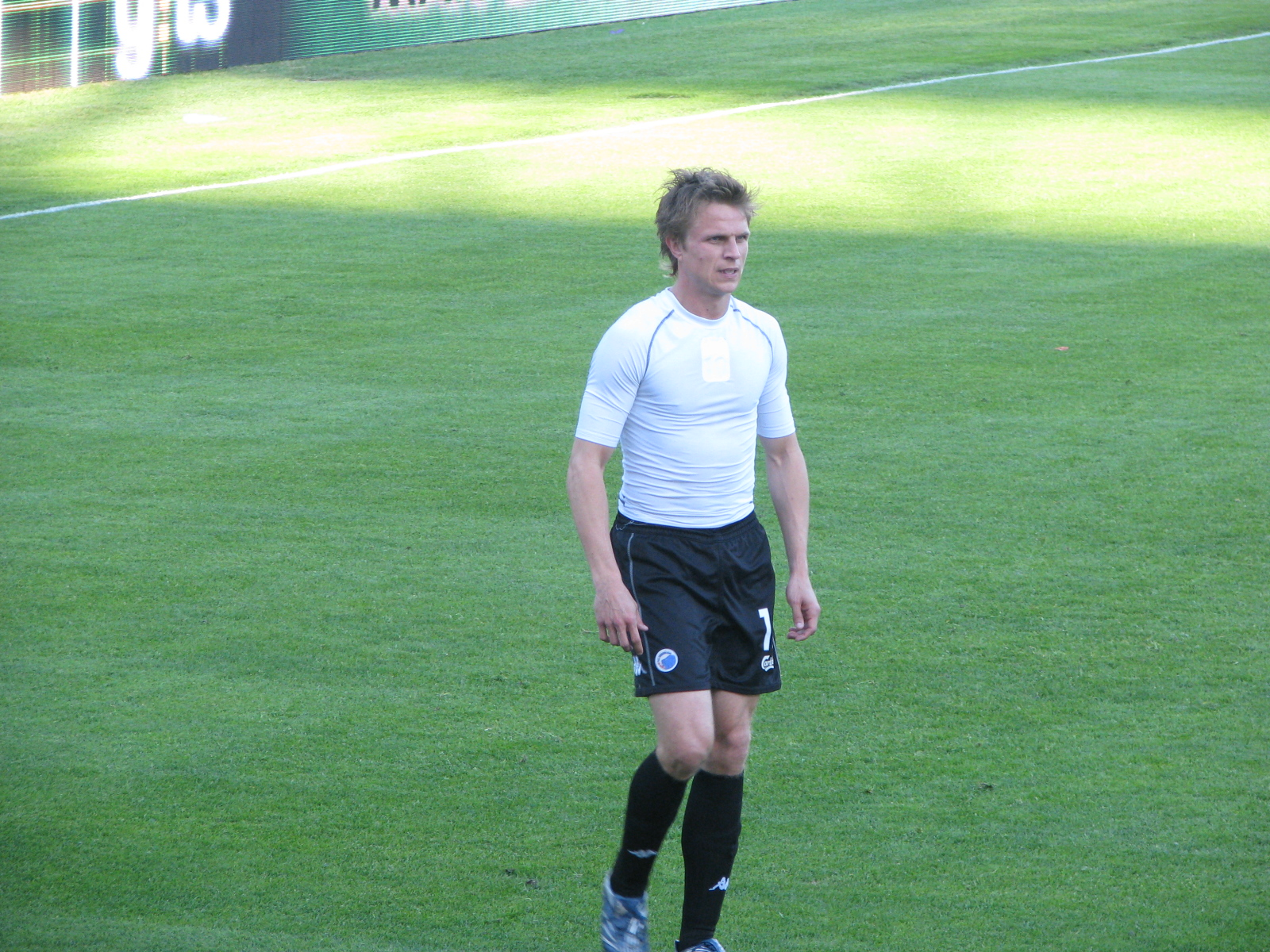
Jesper Grønkjær during a Copenhagen warm-up

Grønkjær was presented as a new player for the defending Danish Superliga champions Copenhagen on 23 June 2006. Seen as an important player for Copenhagen's UEFA Champions League ambitions, Grønkjær helped the team qualify for the 2006–07 tournament, the first tournament participation in club history. He picked up a groin injury in a September 2006 Champions League match against Portuguese team Benfica. He was given a prognosis of an eight- to twelve-week recovery, and returned in a November game against Esbjerg in the Danish Cup. On 6 December 2006, he scored the second Champions League goal of his career, against Scottish team Celtic in a match FCK won 3–1 at the Parken Stadium. By the end of the season, Grønkjær had played 21 of 33 games, as Copenhagen retained the 2006–07 Danish Superliga championship. In November 2007, Grønkjær was named both Superliga Profile of the Year and Superliga Player of the Year.

During the closing games of the 2007–08 football season in May 2008, Grønkjær sustained a knee injury. The injury became infected by staphylococcus, and required three bouts of surgery. He did not recover until halfway through the 2008–09 football season, when he rejoined the Copenhagen team for a friendly match against Swedish team Malmö in January 2009. By the end of that season, he had again earned a place in the starting line up, as Grønkjær helped Copenhagen win the Double of both 2008–09 Danish Superliga championship and the 2008–09 Danish Cup trophy. Grønkjær played the highest number of games in his Copenhagen career during the 2009–10 football season, as he helped the club win the 2009–10 Danish Superliga championship.

With two goals in 12 games, Grønkjær helped Copenhagen advance to the 2010–11 Champions League Round of 16, as the first Danish team to advance that far into the tournament. Copenhagen was eventually eliminated by Grønkjær's former team Chelsea. On 26 May 2011, with Copenhagen having already secured the 2010–11 Danish Superliga championship, Grønkjær announced that he would retire from professional football after the last league match of that Superliga season. "I'd like to be able to go jogging when I have played my last football game," he said. "I want a life without aches." He played his last game against his first professional club AaB, and scored the final goal in a 2–0 victory for Copenhagen.

=== Return to football ===
On 1 February 2016, it was confirmed that Grønkjær had signed with lower amateur-side Græsrødderne.

== International career ==
While at Thisted, Grønkjær made his debut for the Danish youth national teams in October 1992. With three goals in six matches, as the Denmark national youth team won silver medals at the 1994 UEFA European Under-16 Football Championship, Grønkjær showed himself one of the brightest talents in Danish football. He was named 1995 Danish Under-19 Player of the Year. In total, he scored 26 goals in 64 Danish youth team international games.

In his first year at Ajax, Grønkjær made his full international debut for the Denmark national team in the 2000 European Championship (Euro 2000) qualification game against Italy on 27 March 1999. In the very first minute of the game, he famously echoed Jesper Olsen's 1986 World Cup mistimed back pass to Spanish forward Emilio Butragueño, as Grønkjær passed the ball to Italian forward Filippo Inzaghi who promptly scored the first goal in Italy's 2–1 victory. Despite the disappointing debut game, Grønkjær became an important part of the national team under coach Bo Johansson and he played full-time in Denmark's three games at the Euro 2000 main tournament.

While at Chelsea, Grønkjær became a mainstay in the Denmark national team under new national team coach Morten Olsen, and he played in all of Denmark's four games at the 2002 World Cup. In the qualification games for Euro 2004, he scored the game-winning goal in a 1–0 victory over closest rivals Norway, helping Denmark qualify for the final tournament in Portugal. He missed the opening game of Euro 2004 due to the death of his mother, but went to Portugal to join the Danish squad and scored the second goal of the 2–0 win against Bulgaria.

He was included in Olsen's squad for the 2010 FIFA World Cup in South Africa. After Denmark's elimination from the 2010 World Cup, Grønkjær announced his retirement from international football.

== Career statistics ==
=== Club ===
Appearances and goals by club, season and competition
Club	Season	League			National cup		League cup		Europe/Royal League		Total	
Club	Season	Division	Apps	Goals	Apps	Goals	Apps	Goals	Apps	Goals	Apps	Goals
AaB	1995–96	Superliga	29	3			–		8 (Note: Appearances in UEFA Champions League)	0	37	3
AaB	1996–97	Superliga	28	1			–		–		28	1
AaB	1997–98	Superliga	29	6			–		–		29	6
AaB	Total		86	10			–		8	0	94	10
Ajax	1998–99	Eredivisie	25	8	4	2	–		4	0	33	10
Ajax	1999–2000	Eredivisie	25	3	1	0	–		4 (Note: Appearances in UEFA Cup)	0	30	3
Ajax	2000–01	Eredivisie	5	1	0	0	–		1	1	6	2
Ajax	Total		55	12	5	2	0	0	9	1	69	15
Chelsea	2000–01	Premier League	14	1	2	2	0	0	0	0	16	3
Chelsea	2001–02	Premier League	13	0	3	0	0	0	0	0	16	0
Chelsea	2002–03	Premier League	30	4	5	1	2	0	2	0	39	5
Chelsea	2003–04	Premier League	31	2	4	0	3	0	10	1	48	3
Chelsea	Total		88	7	14	3	5	0	12	1	119	11
Birmingham City	2004–05	Premier League	16	0	0	0	2	1	–		18	1
Atlético Madrid	2004–05	La Liga	16	0	1	0	–		–		17	0
VfB Stuttgart	2005–06	Bundesliga	25	0	2	0	1	0	7	0	35	0
Copenhagen	2006–07	Superliga	21	5	4	0	–		11	2	36	7
Copenhagen	2007–08	Superliga	25	3	3	1	–		7	1	35	5
Copenhagen	2008–09	Superliga	14	2	0	0	–		2	0	16	2
Copenhagen	2009–10	Superliga	29	2	1	0	–		12	4	42	6
Copenhagen	2010–11	Superliga	25	4	1	0	–		12	2	38	6
Copenhagen	Total		114	16	9	1	–		44	9	167	26
Career total			400	45	31	6	8	1	80	11	519	63

=== International ===
Scores and results list Denmark's goal tally first, score column indicates score after each Grønkjær goal.

List of international goals scored by Jesper Grønkjær
No.	Date	Venue	Opponent	Score	Result	Competition
1	25 April 2001	Copenhagen, Denmark	Slovenia	1–0	3–0	Friendly
2	26 May 2002	Wakayama, Japan	Tunisia	1–0	2–1	Friendly
3	7 June 2003	Copenhagen, Denmark	Norway	1–0	1–0	UEFA Euro 2004 qualifier
4	20 August 2003	Copenhagen, Denmark	Finland	1–0	1–1	Friendly
5	18 June 2004	Braga, Portugal	Bulgaria	2–0	2–0	UEFA Euro 2004

== Honours ==
Ajax

- KNVB Cup: 1998–99

Chelsea

- FA Cup runner-up: 2001–02

Copenhagen

- Danish Superliga: 2006–07, 2008–09, 2009–10, 2010–11
- Danish Cup: 2008–09

Individual

- Danish Under-19 Player of the Year: 1995
- TIPS-bladet's Player of the Year: 2006–07
- TIPS-bladet's Autumn Profile: 2007
- Team of the Year: 2007
- Danish Superliga Profile of the Year: 2007
- Danish Superliga Player of the Year: 2006–07
