= Mathias Jørgensen =

Danish footballer (born 1990)

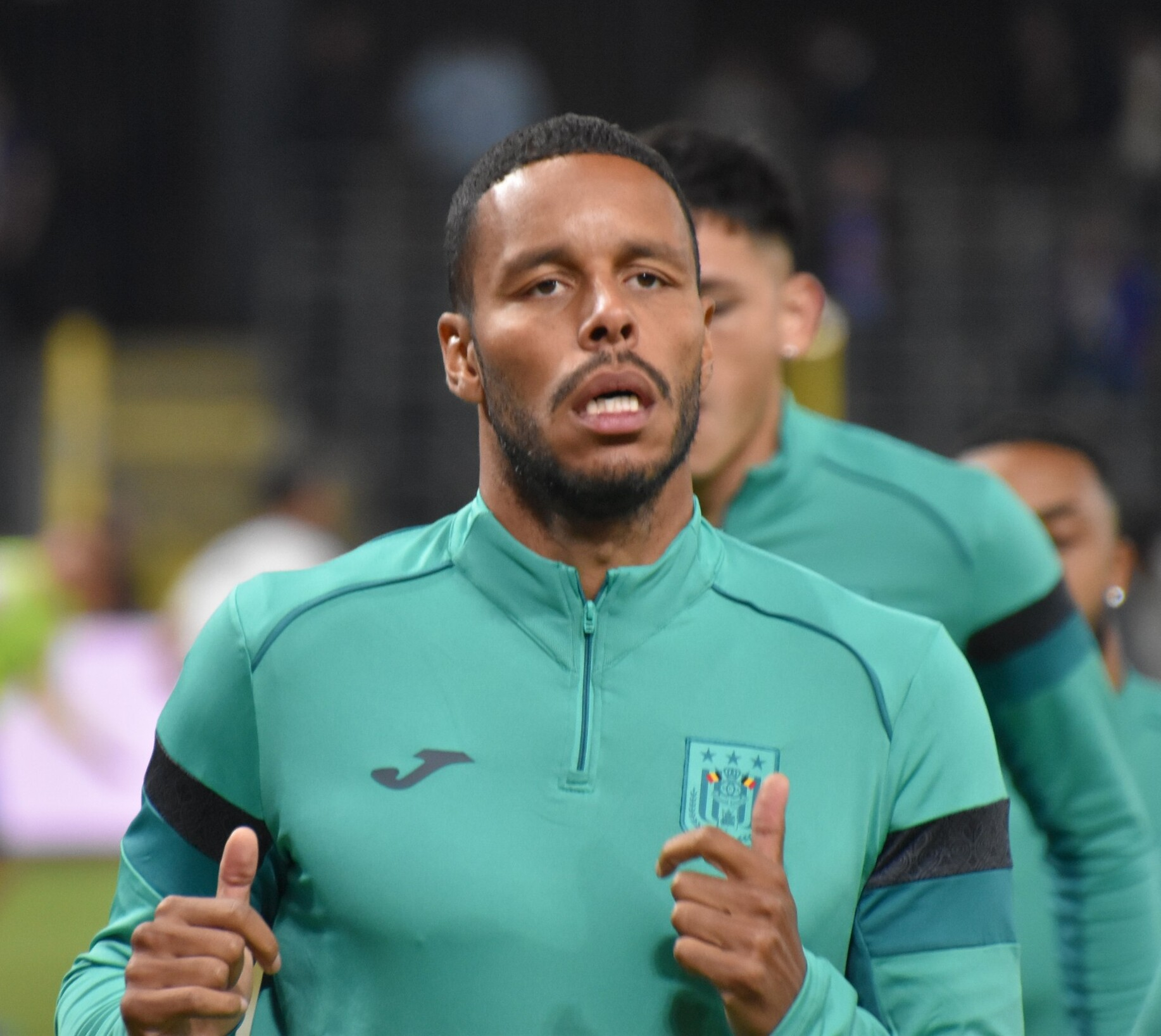
- Jørgensen playing for RSC Anderlecht in 2024

Personal information
- Full name: Mathias Jattah-Njie Jørgensen
- Date of birth: 23 April 1990 (age 36)
- Place of birth: Copenhagen, Denmark
- Height: 1.91 m (6 ft 3 in)
- Positions: Centre-back; right-back

Team information
- Current team: Copenhagen
- Number: 25

Youth career
- 1994–2007: B.93

Senior career*
Years	Team	Apps	(Gls)
2007–2012	Copenhagen	92	(6)
2012–2014	PSV Eindhoven	14	(2)
2013–2014	Jong PSV	7	(1)
2014–2017	Copenhagen	93	(4)
2017–2019	Huddersfield Town	62	(3)
2019–2021	Fenerbahçe	18	(2)
2020	→ Fortuna Düsseldorf (loan)	9	(0)
2020–2021	→ Copenhagen (loan)	26	(1)
2021–2024	Brentford	40	(2)
2024–2025	Anderlecht	17	(0)
2025–2026	LA Galaxy	17	(0)
2026	Copenhagen	12	(0)

International career
2006	Denmark U16	1	(0)
2006–2007	Denmark U17	3	(0)
2007	Denmark U18	1	(0)
2008–2012	Denmark U21	15	(1)
2008–2024	Denmark	37	(2)
- * Club domestic league appearances and goals as of 20:03, 21 May 2026 (UTC)

Mathias Jattah-Njie Jørgensen (Danish pronunciation: [mæˈtsʰiˀæs ˈjɶɐ̯ˀn̩sn̩]; born 23 April 1990), commonly known by his mononymous nickname Zanka (Danish pronunciation: [ˈsɑŋkʰæ]), is a Danish professional footballer who plays as a centre-back for Copenhagen.

Jørgensen began his career at boyhood club FC Copenhagen, playing regularly in five Superliga seasons, before a move to PSV Eindhoven in 2012, where he spent two seasons in the Eredivisie before returning to Denmark after finding his chances limited. He joined Premier League club Huddersfield Town in July 2017 for a fee of £3.5 million, where he played until their relegation in 2019. Afterwards, he played for Fenerbahçe, before returning to the Premier League in 2021 where he signed with Brentford.

Formerly an international at under-16, under-17, under-18 and under-21 level, Jørgensen made his senior international debut for Denmark aged 18 in November 2008.

== Club career ==
=== FC Copenhagen ===
Born to a Danish mother and a Gambian father, Jørgensen moved to FC Copenhagen from neighbouring club B.93, where he had played in first-team matches even at the young age of 16. He signed a three-year contract with FCK on 26 June 2007. Before signing with the Danish champions, he had visited Arsenal for a one-week trial.

On 21 July 2007, Jørgensen strained the inner ligament in the left knee in a reserve team match – less than a month after he moved to the club. On 9 September, he played again for the reserve team.

His first team debut came on 26 September 2007 in a cup match against FC Fredericia. He substituted Oscar Wendt five minutes before full-time, in the match FCK won 3–1. Three days later he got his Superliga debut, this time replacing Hjalte Nørregaard about 15 minutes before full-time.

Only eight days after his first team debut, Jørgensen was thrown on pitch in the extra time of the UEFA Cup first round second leg at Parken Stadium against RC Lens, after captain Michael Gravgaard had received a red card. He was substituted for Marcus Allbäck and played in the central defence together with Brede Hangeland, and they prevented any more goals for Lens, despite being down a man.

On 19 November 2008, he made his debut for the Denmark national football team in a friendly against Wales. After Roland Nilsson became manager for Copenhagen he became captain for "The Lions". 22 February 2012 it was announced that Jørgensen would join Dutch club PSV Eindhoven on a free transfer during the summer transfer window.

=== PSV ===
Jørgensen was featured in an unofficial pre-season tournament, The Polish Masters, in July 2012 and scored his first goal for PSV in their game against S.L. Benfica on 22 July. However, he struggled to break into PSV's first XI and only played 14 matches for the club over the course of two years.

=== Return to FC Copenhagen ===
On 7 July 2014, Jørgensen returned to his former team FC Copenhagen for a fee of around 600,000 Euros.

=== Huddersfield Town ===
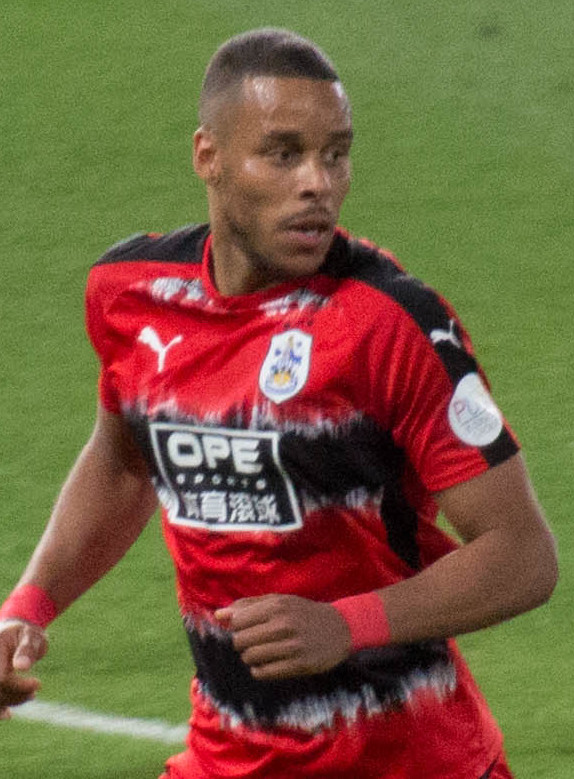
Jørgensen playing for Huddersfield Town in 2018

On 7 July 2017, Huddersfield Town confirmed the signing of Jørgensen from FC Copenhagen for £3.5 million on a three-year contract. Jørgensen made 65 total appearances for the Terriers in his two seasons with the club as they suffered relegation to the Championship after the 2018–19 season.

=== Fenerbahçe ===
On 10 August 2019, Huddersfield Town confirmed that the defender had joined Fenerbahçe on a permanent deal. The terms of the transfer were undisclosed.

On 31 January 2020, Jørgensen joined Fortuna Düsseldorf on loan until the end of the 2019–20 season.

On 5 October 2020, Jørgensen again returned to F.C. Copenhagen on loan until the end of the 2020–21 season.

=== Brentford ===
On 9 September 2021, Jørgensen joined Premier League club Brentford on a one-year contract. During an injury-hit 2021–22 season, made 10 appearances and scored one goal.

After his contract expired in June 2022, it was announced by the club that, whilst he would depart as an official squad member, he would be allowed to train with them in order to complete his rehabilitation on an adductor injury and enable him to find a new club. In July 2022, he joined the club's pre-season training camp in Germany, and on 22 August 2022 signed a new one-year contract with an option for an extra year, fulfilling both.

=== Anderlecht ===
On 15 August 2024, Jørgensen joined Belgian Pro League club Anderlecht on a one-year deal.

On 17 August 2024, he made his debut for Anderlecht, immediately being placed into the starting XI in a 3–1 away win in a Belgian Pro League match against KV Mechelen, providing his first assist for the club.

=== LA Galaxy ===
On 15 January 2025, Jørgensen signed with Major League Soccer club LA Galaxy on a two-year contract. On 2 February 2026, Jørgensen and LA Galaxy mutually agreed to terminate his contract.

=== Fourth period at FC Copenhagen ===
On 24 February 2026 Jørgensen joined Copenhagen for the fourth time in his career. FC Copenhagen only had a single centerback available due to injuries, and therefore they moved for 'Zanka' on a free transfer on a contract until the end of the 2025–26 season. After the season he announced that he would not have his contract extended.

== International career ==
In May 2018 he was named in Denmark's preliminary 35-man squad for the 2018 FIFA World Cup in Russia. In the round of 16 against Croatia, he scored the opening goal in the first minute of the match. In the 116th minute, he commit a professional foul in the penalty area to prevent Croatia from scoring a late winning goal, and was subsequently yellow carded. His tackle temporarily paid off as Danish goalkeeper Kasper Schmeichel saved Luka Modrić's penalty kick, maintaining the 1–1 draw and forcing the match into a penalty shootout. However, Denmark would go on to lose the shootout 3–2.

In May 2021, he was named in Denmark's 26-man squad for the UEFA Euro 2020, where Denmark reached the semi-finals, and was selected again for UEFA Euro 2024, where Denmark went out in the last 16.

== Personal life ==
Jørgensen previously dated Hungarian model Enikő Mihalik.

Jørgensen wrote an article against homophobia in football for the Danish Football Players Association in 2016. In February 2017, following the monetary settlement that the players association had with the Denmark national team, Jørgensen donated the 667,000 Danish kroner ($94,380) to help fund a new pro-LGBT+ campaign called 'Fodbold for alle' or 'Football for all' and visited schools to talk about the problem of homophobia.

Jørgensen married Nanna Ottosen in April 2022 in Chelsea, London. They have a son, born 31 October 2021.

== Nickname ==
Jørgensen received his nickname "Zanka" from the film Cool Runnings, in which the character played by Doug E. Doug is named Sanka. The nickname was coined by Johan Lange in 2000, while both Lange and Jørgensen were playing for B.93. Lange would go on to be one of the assistant managers during Jørgensen's first spell at FC Copenhagen, and he would later serve as the technical director when Jørgensen returned to the club in 2014.

== Career statistics ==
=== Club ===
As of match played 21 May 2026

Appearances and goals by club, season and competition
Club	Season	League			National cup		League cup		Continental		Other		Total	
Club	Season	Division	Apps	Goals	Apps	Goals	Apps	Goals	Apps	Goals	Apps	Goals	Apps	Goals
Copenhagen	2007–08	Danish Superliga	12	1	0	0	—		0	0	—		12	1
Copenhagen	2008–09	Danish Superliga	20	0	0	0	—		10	0	—		30	0
Copenhagen	2009–10	Danish Superliga	24	4	0	0	—		9	1	—		33	5
Copenhagen	2010–11	Danish Superliga	25	1	1	1	—		11	0	—		37	1
Copenhagen	2011–12	Danish Superliga	11	0	2	0	—		4	0	—		17	0
Copenhagen	Total		92	6	3	1	—		34	0	—		129	7
PSV Eindhoven	2012–13	Eredivisie	5	2	3	1	—		2	1	—		10	4
PSV Eindhoven	2013–14	Eredivisie	9	0	0	0	—		5	0	—		14	0
PSV Eindhoven	Total		14	2	3	1	—		7	1	—		24	4
Jong PSV	2013–14	Eerste Divisie	7	1	—		—		—		—		7	1
Copenhagen	2014–15	Danish Superliga	29	1	4	0	—		9	1	—		42	2
Copenhagen	2015–16	Danish Superliga	31	3	5	1	—		3	0	—		39	4
Copenhagen	2016–17	Danish Superliga	33	0	3	0	—		15	2	—		51	2
Copenhagen	Total		93	4	12	1	—		27	3	—		132	8
Huddersfield Town	2017–18	Premier League	38	0	2	0	0	0	—		—		40	0
Huddersfield Town	2018–19	Premier League	24	3	1	0	0	0	—		—		25	3
Huddersfield Town	Total		62	3	3	0	0	0	—		—		65	3
Fenerbahçe	2019–20	Süper Lig	16	2	3	1	—		—		—		19	3
Fenerbahçe	2020–21	Süper Lig	2	0	0	0	—		—		—		2	0
Fenerbahçe	Total		18	2	3	1	—		—		—		21	3
Fortuna Düsseldorf (loan)	2019–20	Bundesliga	9	0	2	1	—		—		—		11	1
Copenhagen (loan)	2020–21	Danish Superliga	26	1	1	0	—		—		—		27	1
Brentford	2021–22	Premier League	8	1	0	0	2	0	—		—		10	1
Brentford	2022–23	Premier League	18	0	0	0	2	0	—		—		20	0
Brentford	2023–24	Premier League	14	1	2	0	2	0	—		—		18	1
Brentford	Total		40	2	2	0	6	0	—		—		48	2
Anderlecht	2024–25	Belgian Pro League	17	0	2	1	—		7 (Note: Appearances in UEFA Europa League)	0	—		26	1
LA Galaxy	2025	Major League Soccer	17	0	—		—		3 (Note: Appearances in CONCACAF Champions Cup)	0	5 (Note: Appearances in Leagues Cup)	0	25	0
Copenhagen	2025–26	Danish Superliga	12	0	2	0	—		—		—		14	0
Career total			407	21	33	6	6	0	78	5	5	0	529	32

=== International ===
As of match played 5 June 2024

Appearances and goals by national team and year
National team	Year	Apps	Goals
Denmark	2008	1	0
Denmark	2010	2	0
Denmark	2011	3	0
Denmark	2016	3	0
Denmark	2017	2	0
Denmark	2018	9	1
Denmark	2019	8	1
Denmark	2020	6	0
Denmark	2021	1	0
Denmark	2023	1	0
Denmark	2024	1	0
Total		37	2

Scores and results list Denmark's goal tally first, score column indicates score after each Jørgensen goal.

List of international goals scored by Mathias Jørgensen
No.	Date	Venue	Cap	Opponent	Score	Result	Competition
1	1 July 2018	Nizhny Novgorod Stadium, Nizhny Novgorod, Russia	15	Croatia	1–0	1–1 (2–3 p)	2018 FIFA World Cup
2	26 March 2019	St. Jakob-Park, Basel, Switzerland	22	Switzerland	1–3	3–3	UEFA Euro 2020 qualification

== Honours ==
FC Copenhagen

- Danish Superliga: 2008–09, 2009–10, 2010–11, 2015–16, 2016–17
- Danish Cup: 2008–09, 2011–12, 2014–15, 2015–16, 2016–17

Individual

- Players' Talent of the Year: 2008
- Arla Talent of the Year: 2008
- Arla U-19 National Team Talent of the Year: 2008
- F.C. Copenhagen Player of the Year: 2017
