= TV3 Puls =

- Country: Denmark
- Broadcast area: Denmark

Ownership
- Owner: Viaplay Group
- Sister channels: TV3, TV3+, TV3 MAX, TV3 Sport, See

History
- Launched: March 23, 2008
- Replaced: ZTV

Availability

Terrestrial
- Boxer: -

TV3 Puls is television channel broadcasting to Denmark. It started broadcasting March 23, 2008.

Among the programmes broadcast on the channel from its launch are series such as Mad Men and Pushing Daisies, lifestyle programmes and sports events such as Formula 1.

TV3 and TV3+ are sister channels to TV3 Puls. However, TV3 Puls primarily focuses on various lifestyle programs for men, women, children and family.
