= Dennis Flinta =

Danish footballer (born 1983)

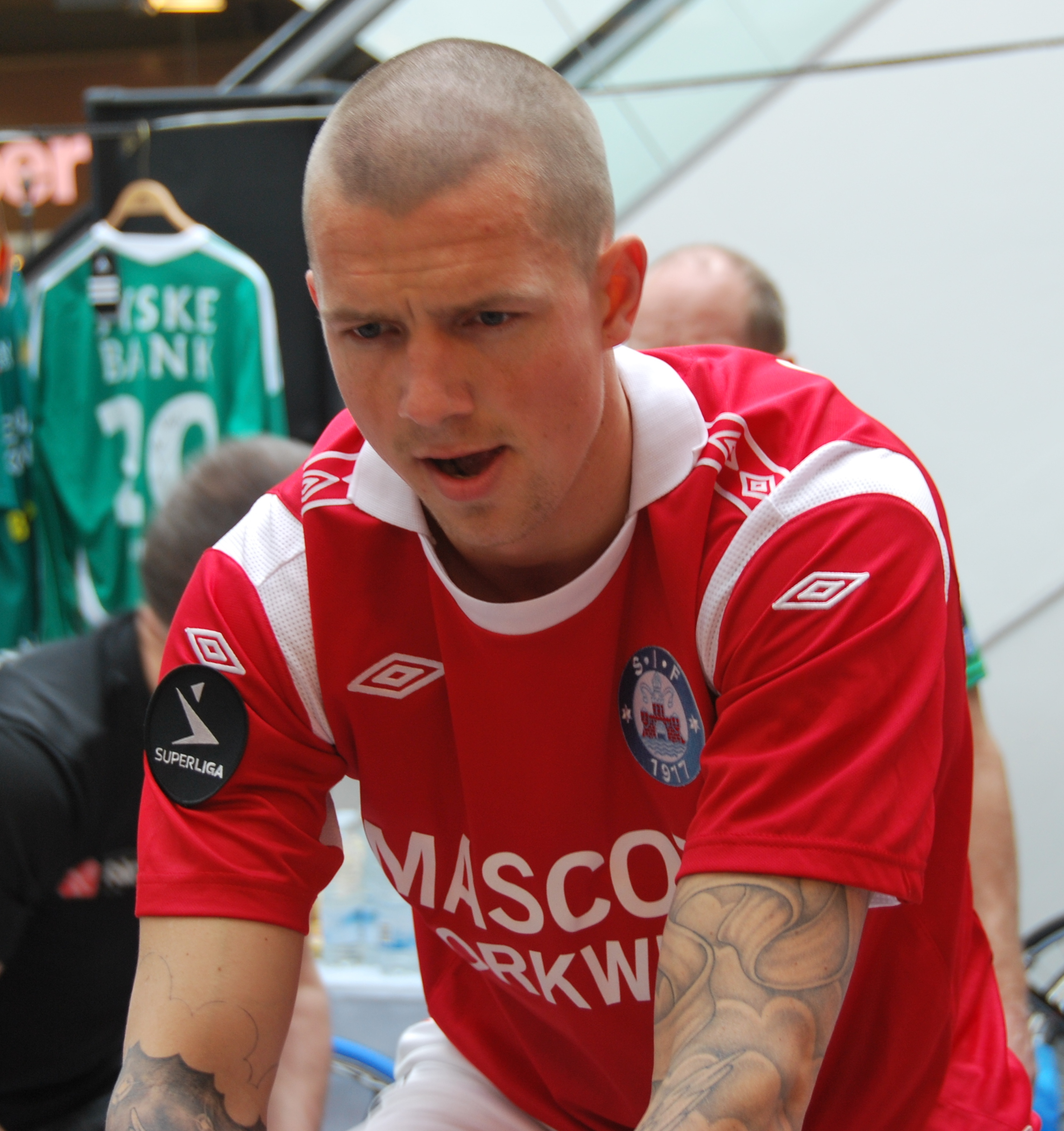

Personal information
- Date of birth: 14 November 1983 (age 42)
- Place of birth: Denmark
- Height: 1.84 m (6 ft 0 in)
- Position: Midfielder

Youth career
- 1998–2001: BK Avarta
- 2001–2002: Hvidovre IF
- 2002–2003: Kjøbenhavns Boldklub
- 2003–2004: Brøndby IF

Senior career*
Years	Team	Apps	(Gls)
2004–2007	Silkeborg IF	54	(4)
2007–2009	FC Midtjylland	25	(0)
2009–2019	Silkeborg IF	285	(19)
- * Club domestic league appearances and goals as of 18:49, 1 January 2020 (UTC)

Dennis Flinta (born 14 November 1983) is a Danish retired professional football midfielder.

== Career ==
Flinta started his career with a number of Copenhagen clubs. He played in the reserve team of Brøndby IF, but did not play any senior matches for the club. In 2004, he moved to Silkeborg IF, and made his Danish Superliga debut. He had a short spell at league rivals FC Midtjylland, before moving back to Silkeborg, now in the secondary Danish 1st Division. He helped Silkeborg gain promotion for the Superliga.

At the end of 2019, Flinta announced his retirement at the age of 36. With a total of 386 games played for Silkeborg, he became the second most playing player in the club's history.
