= Rune Nilssen =

Norwegian footballer (born 1975)

Personal information
- Date of birth: 24 October 1975 (age 51)
- Place of birth: Kristiansand, Norway
- Height: 1.86 m (6 ft 1 in)
- Position: Goalkeeper

Senior career*
Years	Team	Apps	(Gls)
1993–2002	FK Vigør		
2003–2010	IK Start	77	(0)
2009	→ F.C. Copenhagen (loan)	0	(0)
- * Club domestic league appearances and goals

Rune Nilssen (born 24 October 1975) is a Norwegian retired football player.

Nilssen previously played for FK Vigør. He joined Start ahead of the 2003 season. In the autumn 2009, Nilssen was on loan at F.C. Copenhagen, without gaining a single game.
