= TV3+ (Danish TV channel) =

TV3+ Denmark
- Country: Denmark

Ownership
- Owner: Viaplay Group
- Sister channels: TV3, TV3 Puls, TV3 MAX, TV3 Sport, See

History
- Launched: 27 March 1995 (as TV6 Denmark); 29 April 1996 (as TV3+ Denmark)
- Replaced: TV6 Denmark

Availability

Terrestrial
- Boxer: Channel 500
- Televarpið: Channel 13

TV3+ is a Danish pay television channel owned by Viaplay Group. It has its origins in the youth-oriented channel ZTV and women-focused channel TV6 that were launched in the mid-1990s when Kinnevik invested heavily in new free-to-air channels. In April 1996, Danish ZTV was closed down along with Sportskanalen, and TV6 was replaced by a new channel called 3+. In the beginning, 3+ time-shared with TVG in the mornings, ZTV in the afternoon and Sportskanalen in the weekend, but eventually these channels closed down.

== Television series ==
TV3+'s programming includes most notably sitcoms:

- 8 Simple Rules
- American Dad!
- Family Guy
- Family Ties
- Full House
- How I Met Your Mother
- Kath & Kim
- King of the Hill
- Married... with Children
- My Boys
- Listen Up
- Less than Perfect moved to Kanal 5
- Scrubs
- Seinfeld
- The Drew Carey Show
- The Hughleys
- The Jamie Foxx Show
- The Simpsons

Dramas like

- Cold Case
- Bones
- Dexter
- Knight Rider
- Miami Vice
- NCIS
- Over There
- Southland
- Supernatural

Documentary/reality shows like

- An Idiot Abroad
- Criss Angel Mindfreak
- Deadliest Catch
- Family Business
- Guinea Pig
- Miami Ink
- Ninja Warrior
- Politistationen
- Speed
- Survivor: The Australian Outback
- Top Gear
- Urban Legends

The channel will however broadcast some movies.

On 2 February 2010 a HD-version of the channel, started broadcasting.
