= Johan Lange (football executive) =

Football coach

Personal information
- Full name: Johan Lange
- Date of birth: 22 November 1979 (age 46)
- Place of birth: Copenhagen, Denmark

Team information
- Current team: Tottenham Hotspur (Sporting Director)

Managerial career
- Years: Team
- 2013: Lyngby

Johan Lange (born 22 November 1979) is a Danish football executive and former manager. He is currently a Sporting Director of Premier League club Tottenham Hotspur.

== Coaching career ==
Lange started his coaching career at Danish Superliga side Copenhagen, working as their assistant manager for three and a half years, before departing on 30 June 2012 to join EFL Championship club Wolverhampton Wanderers as assistant manager to Ståle Solbakken.

On 5 January 2013, following a string a poor results, which left Wolves 18th in the Championship - and a FA Cup defeat to non-league Luton Town, Solbakken and his backroom staff were sacked.

On 2 February 2013, Lange was hired as head coach of Lyngby in the Danish 1st Division.

== Transition into other roles ==
In 2014, Lange was reunited with Solbakken, as he rejoined Copenhagen as development director, the role changing to Technical Director within the same season. In this role he became known for his apparent knack of signing players for a low cost, then later selling them at great profit to Europe's elite clubs, all whilst Copenhagen continued to win trophies domestically and compete in the UEFA Champions League.

On 30 July 2020, Lange joined Premier League team Aston Villa as Sporting Director. Following Aston Villa's survival from relegation the previous season, and subsequent departure of Jesus Garcia Pitarch as Sporting Director, Lange was tasked with helping build a team that would challenge at the top half of the Premier League, rather than battle against relegation. The signings of Emi Martínez, Matty Cash, Bertrand Traoré, Ollie Watkins and Morgan Sanson as well as Ross Barkley joining on loan from Chelsea helped Aston Villa to achieve that goal, finishing 11th in Lange's first season, spending most of the season in the top half of the table and having not been in serious danger of relegation at any point of the season.

On 16 June 2023, as part of an internal restructuring process, Monchi was named as Aston Villa's President of Football Operations. Lange now assumed the role of "Global Director of Football Development and International Academies".

On 9 October 2023, Lange left Aston Villa to become Technical Director at Tottenham Hotspur. On 15 October 2025, Lange was promoted to the role of joint Sporting Director at Tottenham Hotspur alongside the returning Fabio Paratici. On 14 January 2026, Tottenham Hotspur announced the departure of Paratici as co-sporting director after the conclusion of the 2025-26 summer transfer window. Following Paratici's departure, Lange remains the club's sole Sporting Director.
