= Anders Egholm =

Danish footballer (born 1983)

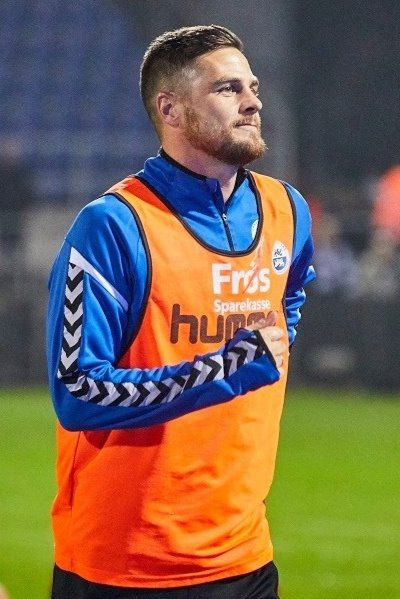

Personal information
- Full name: Anders Høyen Egholm
- Date of birth: 15 May 1983 (age 43)
- Place of birth: Næsbjerg, Denmark
- Height: 1.89 m (6 ft 2 1/2 in)
- Position: Centre back

Youth career
- Næsbjerg RUI

Senior career*
| Years | Team | Apps | (Gls) |
| 2002–2005 | Esbjerg fB | 20 | (0) |
| 2005–2006 | Herfølge BK | 13 | (1) |
| 2007–2010 | SønderjyskE | 43 | (2) |
| 2010–2013 | Randers FC | 75 | (3) |
| 2013–2016 | Hobro IK | 72 | (7) |
| 2016–2017 | Vejle BK | 18 | (0) |
| 2017–2018 | SønderjyskE | 18 | (2) |
| 2019–2020 | Varde IF | | |

International career
| 2003 | Denmark U20 | 1 | (0) |

Managerial career
- 2019–2021: Varde IF (assistant)
- 2022: Hobro IK (assistant)
- * Club domestic league appearances and goals as of 11 January 2019

Anders Høyen Egholm (born 15 May 1983) is a Danish retired professional football defender.

== Career ==
On 6 November 2009, the central defender, with a contract expiring within the end of November 2009 with Danish side of SønderjyskE, signed an agreement with Randers FC, starting from January 2010.

Egholm announced on 25 November 2018, that he would retire at the end of 2018, and would be leaving SønderjyskE. But Egholm was not done playing. He signed with lower Danish Series club Varde IF as a playing assistant coach.

On April 15, 2021, Egholm was presented as the new assistant coach at Hobro IK under manager Michael Kryger.
