= Rasmus Grønborg Hansen =

Danish footballer (born 1986)

Rasmus Hansen
Personal information
- Full name: Rasmus Grønberg Hansen
- Date of birth: 9 April 1986 (age 40)
- Place of birth: Denmark
- Height: 1.83 m (6 ft 0 in)
- Position: Defensive midfielder

Team information
- Current team: AB (talent manager)

Youth career
- –2001: Randers Freja
- 2002–2003: FC Midtjylland

Senior career*
Years	Team	Apps	(Gls)
2004–2008	FC Midtjylland	6	(0)
2007	→ SønderjyskE (loan)		
2008–2011	SønderjyskE	84	(4)
2011–2014	Randers FC	39	(0)
2013	→ SønderjyskE (loan)	10	(0)
2013–2014	→ Vejle BK (loan)	26	(2)
2014–2015	Hobro IK	4	(0)
2015–2017	AB	31	(2)

International career
2001	Denmark U-16	1	(0)
2002	Denmark U-17	3	(0)
2003–2004	Denmark U-18	3	(0)
2004	Denmark U-19	1	(1)
2008	Denmark U-21	1	(0)
- * Club domestic league appearances and goals

Rasmus Grønborg Hansen (born 9 April 1986) is a Danish retired professional football defensive midfielder.

== After retiring ==
After retiring at the end of the 2016/17 season, Hansen took an education in sports management and later worked in a company that assists in the recruitment of coaches. On 21 June 2019, he was hired as talent manager at Akademisk Boldklub.
