= Jonas Henriksen (footballer) =

Danish footballer (born 1991)

Personal information
- Full name: Jonas Henriksen
- Date of birth: 6 March 1991 (age 35)
- Place of birth: Herlev, Denmark
- Position: Defender

Youth career
- Copenhagen

Senior career*
| Years | Team | Apps | (Gls) |
| 2010–2013 | Lyngby | 40 | (3) |
| 2013–2017 | AB | 80 | (6) |
| 2017–2021 | Helsingør | 69 | (5) |
- * Club domestic league appearances and goals as of 17:26, 29 June 2021 (UTC)

Jonas Henriksen (born 6 March 1991) is a Danish footballer.
