= Peter Rasmussen (referee) =

Danish football referee (born 1975)

- Full name: Peter Rasmussen
- Born: 15 October 1975 (age 51); Copenhagen, Denmark

Domestic
Years	League	Role

International
Years	League	Role
2006–	FIFA listed	Referee

Peter Rasmussen (born 15 October 1975) is a Danish football referee from Copenhagen.

== Career ==
He began his international career during the Euro 2007 U19s Championship and has since officiated in the UEFA Europa League and the Euro 2008 qualifiers. He has yet to be selected as a primary referee in the finals for a senior international competition. On 11 August 2010, he was selected to officiate the friendly match between the Republic of Ireland and Argentina in Dublin. He officiated the friendly match between England and Belgium, in which the hawk-eye technology was tested for the first time ever in an international match, although he did not use it to make decisions in the match.
