= Chérif Ousmane Sarr =

French-Senegalese footballer (born 1986)

Ousmane Sarr
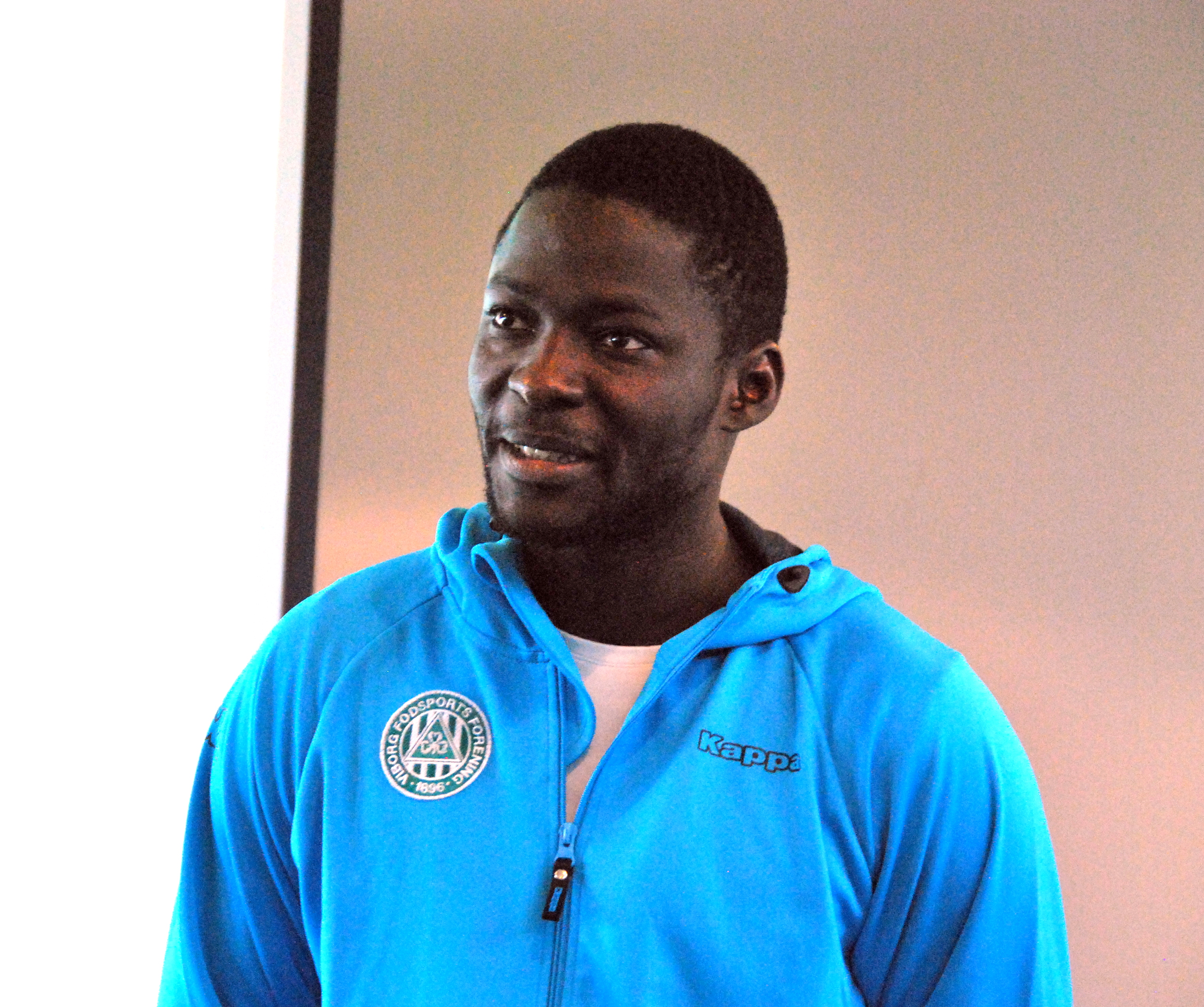
- Sarr with Viborg in 2012

Personal information
- Full name: Chérif Ousmane Sarr
- Date of birth: 2 August 1986 (age 40)
- Place of birth: Fatick, Senegal
- Height: 1.87 m (6 ft 2 in)
- Position: Midfielder

Team information
- Current team: Vierzon

Youth career
- CFSFA Dakar
- 2003–2004: Arsenal

Senior career*
Years	Team	Apps	(Gls)
2004–2006	Saint-Étienne B	45	(4)
2006–2007	Grenoble	27	(2)
2007–2008	Troyes	30	(2)
2010–2011	Randers FC	21	(4)
2012–2013	Viborg	27	(7)
2019–2021	Saran		
2021–	Vierzon		
- * Club domestic league appearances and goals

Chérif Ousmane Sarr (born 2 August 1986) is a footballer who plays as a midfielder for French lower-league club Vierzon.

== Career ==
Sarr was born in Fatick, Senegal. He signed for then-Ligue 2 side Troyes in the summer of 2007 from Grenoblr. He rescinded the contract on 29 September 2009 despite his deal lasting until June 2011.

He trained with the Danish champions F.C. Copenhagen in July 2010, and other Danish clubs, primarily Randers FC, showed interest in him. He signed a one-year contract with Randers FC on 3 August 2010.

In summer 2021 Sarr joined Vierzon from Saran.
