= Nicolai Vollquartz =

Danish football referee (born 1965)

Nicolai Vollquartz (born 7 February 1965) is a Danish football referee. He was born in Viborg. He was promoted to the FIFA referees list in 1999 and took charge of his first UEFA Cup match – a first round tie between Rapid București and Liverpool – on 14 September 2000. His UEFA Champions League debut came a year later, with a second qualifying round match between Wisła Kraków and Skonto. It was another five years before he officiated a Champions League group stage match – the Group B match between Sporting CP and Spartak Moscow on 5 December 2006 – but it was to be his only experience in the group stage.
