= Per Wind =

Danish footballer

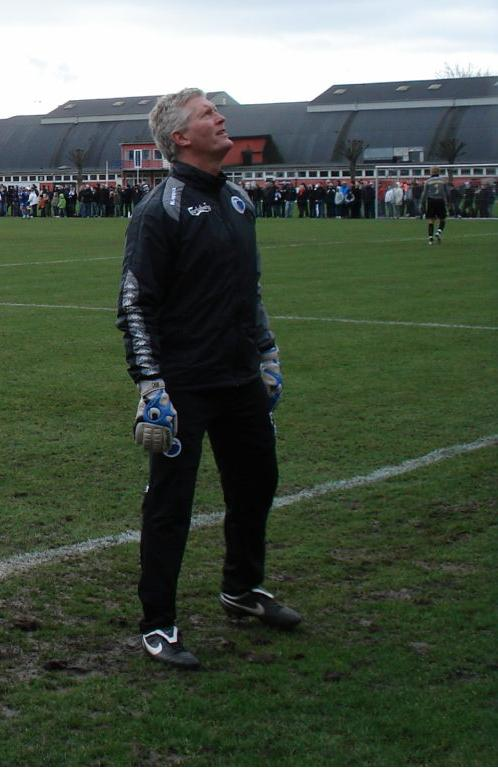
- Wind in 2008

Personal information
- Full name: Per Wind
- Date of birth: 15 August 1955 (age 71)
- Place of birth: Copenhagen, Denmark
- Position: Goalkeeper

Team information
- Current team: F.C. Copenhagen (Team leader)

Youth career
- 1967–1973: Boldklubben Frem

Senior career*
Years	Team	Apps	(Gls)
1973–1993	Boldklubben Frem	589	(0)
1998	Boldklubben Frem	1	(0)

International career
1974–1978	Denmark U21	11	(0)
1977	Denmark	2	(0)

Managerial career
- 1993: Boldklubben Frem
- 1994–1996: Tårnby
- 1997: B 1908 (U18)
- 1997: Boldklubben Frem (U18)
- 1998–1999: Boldklubben Frem (GK)
- 1999–2013: F.C. Copenhagen (GK)
- 2013–2021: F.C. Copenhagen (team leader)
- * Club domestic league appearances and goals

Per Wind, born Per Wind Andersen (born 15 August 1955), is a Danish former professional footballer who played 590 games as a goalkeeper for Boldklubben Frem.

== Playing career ==
Wind made his debut for Boldklubben Frem in 1973, and spent his entire 20-year-long senior career with the club, before retiring in 1993.

== Later career ==
Wind and Finn Bøje became managers of Frem in 1993, and he went on to coach a number of amateur teams. He was hired as Frem's goalkeeping coach in 1997, and he made a one-match come-back for the club in 1998. He also worked for Carlsberg Group for 23 years.

In 1999, he was employed as goalkeeping coach at F.C. Copenhagen on a full-time basis.

== Personal life ==
Per Wind is the father of F.C. Copenhagen and Wolfsburg striker Jonas Wind.

== Honours ==
- Danish Cup: 1978 with Frem
