= Thorbjørn Holst Rasmussen =

Danish footballer (born 1987)

Personal information
- Date of birth: 21 March 1987 (age 39)
- Place of birth: Silkeborg, Denmark
- Height: 1.87 m (6 ft 1 1/2 in)
- Position: Defender

Senior career*
Years	Team	Apps	(Gls)
2006–2016	Silkeborg IF	191	(3)
- * Club domestic league appearances and goals

Thorbjørn Holst Rasmussen (born 21 March 1987) is a Danish former footballer who played as a defender.
