= See (television channel) =

See (formerly known as Xee) is a Danish television channel owned by Viaplay Group. It was launched on 20 January 2019, as a joint venture between Fox Networks Group and TDC through its subsidiary YouSee. On 30 December 2021, Nordic Entertainment Group took over as the new joint-owner of the channel which was renamed See and adopted the branding used by NENT's TV3-branded channels in Denmark. On November 18, 2021, it was announced that Fox Networks Group would be ending its partnership with TDC.

The bulk of its schedule consists of imported US TV series with occasional original content.

== History ==
The channel was announced in November 2018 with a January 2019 launch date, as Xee. The channel name, Xee, was branded to combine the ‘X’ of Fox with the ‘ee’ in YouSee, as well as phonetically being close to the English word ‘see’. Its launch director was Pil Gundelach Brandstrup, formerly of DR.

The channel opened on 20 January 2019 at 4:55pm with a two-hour block of Family Guy episodes. Exactly two months after launch, the acquisition of 21st Century Fox by Disney took place. A few months later, it won the rights bid for the Danish telecasts of the Premier League, shared with TV3, in which Xee aired 116 matches of the upcoming season. Signe Vadgaard was appointed as the presenter for the highlights programmes. In October, Christian Skov became its director.

On 18 November 2021, it was announced that Disney would terminate its agreement (inherited from Fox) to operate Xee and put it in the hands of NENT. From 1 January 2022, the channel was renamed See. In November 2025, the channel started airing UFC and darts tournaments.
