= 2008–09 F.C. Copenhagen season =

F.C. Copenhagen
2008–09 season
- Chairman: Flemming Østergaard
- Manager: Ståle Solbakken
- Danish Superliga: Winners
- Danish Cup: Winners
- UEFA Cup: Round of 32
- Top goalscorer: League: Morten Nordstrand (16); All: Morten Nordstrand (20)
- Highest home attendance: 32,856 (vs Randers FC, 31 May 2009)
- Lowest home attendance: 6,916 (vs Nordvest FC, 28 April 2009)
- Average home league attendance: 18,967
Home colours	Away colours

This article shows statistics of individual players for the football club F.C. Copenhagen. It also lists all matches that F.C. Copenhagen played in the 2008–09 season.

== Events ==
- 2 April: Forward Marcus Allbäck agrees a 1½ year contract with Swedish club Örgryte IS, meaning he will leave FCK on a free transfer on 1 July.
- 26 May: Midfielder Michael Silberbauer joins FC Utrecht on a free transfer.
- 26 May: Assistant coach Peter Nielsen stops.
- 4 June: Bård Wiggen signs as new assistant coach.
- 6 July: Captain Michael Gravgaard is sold to FC Nantes for DKK 29,000,000
- 8 July: Midfielder Morten Bertolt is sold to SønderjyskE for DKK 1,000,000.
- 14 July: It was published that midfielder Thomas Kristensen will join FCK on 1 January on a free transfer.
- 15 July: F.C. Copenhagen and FC Nordsjælland agrees on a transfer fee for Thomas Kristensen, so he can transfer immediately.
- 18 July: Forward César Santin is bought from Kalmar FF for DKK 15,000,000. He will join on 24 July.
- 25 July: Defender Peter Larsson is bought from Halmstads BK for DKK 15,000,000.
- 28 July: Goalkeeper Johan Wiland is bought from IF Elfsborg. He will join the club 1 January 2009.
- 22 December: Midfielder Martin Vingaard is bought from Esbjerg fB for DKK 7,000,000.
- 12 January: Forward Dame N'Doye is bought from OFI for DKK 15,000,000.
- 14 January: Midfielder Mads Laudrup is sold to Herfølge Boldklub.

== Players ==
=== Squad information ===
This section show the squad as currently, considering all players who are confirmedly moved in and out (see section Players in / out).

N	Pos.	Nat.	Name	Age	EU	Since	App	Goals	Ends	Transfer fee	Notes
1	GK	(Denmark)	Christiansen (VC1)	48	EU	2005	195	0	2012	Undisclosed	
2	RB	(Czech Republic)	Pospech	47	EU	2008 (Winter)	65	5	2011	DKK 14m	
3	LB	(Denmark)	N. Jensen (VC2)	51	EU	2007 (Winter)	209	10	2009	Free	
4	CM	(Denmark)	Nørregaard	45	EU	2006	258	31	2010	Free	
5	CB	(Denmark)	Laursen (captain)	50	EU	2008 (Winter)	51	0	2011	Undisclosed	
6	DM	(Denmark)	Würtz	42	EU	2007	33	0	2012	DKK 7m	
7	CF	(Brazil)	Ailton	41	Non-EU	2007 (Winter)	97	29	2011	DKK 22m	
8	CM	(Denmark)	Kvist (VC3)	41	EU	2004	182	10	2012	Youth system	
9	CF	(Denmark)	Nordstrand	42	EU	2007	84	32	2012	DKK 15m	
10	LW	(Denmark) (Greenland)	Grønkjær	48	EU	2006	87	14	2010	DKK 15m	
11	LW	(Brazil)	Santin	45	Non-EU	2008	43	16	2013	DKK 15m	
12	CB	(Sweden)	Larsson	42	EU	2008	11	0	2013	DKK 15m	
13	CM	(Canada)	Hutchinson	43	Non-EU	2006 (Winter)	170	26	2010	DKK 8m	
14	SS	(Senegal)	N'Doye	41	EU	2009 (Winter)	16	5	2013	DKK 15m	
15	CB	(Sweden)	Antonsson	44	EU	2007	47	2	2011	Undisclosed	
16	CM	(Denmark)	Kristensen	43	EU	2008	44	1	2012	Undisclosed	
17	LB	(Sweden)	Wendt	40	EU	2006	116	2	2010	DKK 6m	
18	CF	(Brazil)	Junior	49	Non-EU	2008 (Winter)	29	15	2010	Undisclosed	
20	AM	(Denmark)	Vingaard	41	EU	2009 (Winter)	16	3	2012	DKK 8m	
21	GK	(Sweden)	Wiland	45	EU	2009 (Winter)	3	0	2014	DKK 8m	
24	RW	(Czech Republic)	Sionko	49	EU	2007	77	12	2011	Free	
25	CB	(Denmark)	Zanka	36	EU	2007	53	3	2012	Undisclosed	
26	CB	(Denmark)	Hansen	39	EU	2006	5	0	2008	Youth system	
27	DM	(Denmark)	Neestrup	38	EU	2007	3	0	2009	Youth system	
28	CM	(Denmark)	Laudrup	37	EU	2007	5	0	2009	Youth system	
29	RB	(Denmark)	D. Jensen	36	EU	2008	4	0	2011	Youth system	
30	CB	(Denmark)	Albrechtsen	36	EU	2008	1	0	2010	Youth system	
41	GK	(Australia)	Coe	41	Non-EU	2007 (Winter)	5	0	2009	Undisclosed	

- Last updated: 31 May
- Source: F.C. Copenhagen, players' Wikipedia articles, SJAT.com (for contract endings)
- Ordered by squad number.

=== Squad stats ===
				Total			UEFA Cup		Danish Superliga		Danish Cup	
No.	Pos.	Nat.	Name	Sts	App	Gls	App	Gls	App	Gls	App	Gls
1	GK	(Denmark)	Christiansen	45	45		11		31		3	
2	RB	(Czech Republic)	Pospěch	46	46	3	12	1	29	2	5	
15	CB	(Sweden)	Antonsson	28	28	1	5	1	19		4	
5	CB	(Denmark)	Laursen	37	39		8		28		3	
17	LB	(Denmark)	Wendt	45	46	2	12		31	2	3	
8	CM	(Denmark)	Kvist	37	47	7	12	1	29	4	6	2
4	CM	(Denmark)	Nørregaard	46	48	3	12	1	32	1	4	1
16	CM	(Denmark)	Kristensen	37	44	1	12	1	26		6	
13	CM	(Canada)	Hutchinson	47	48	7	12	1	33	6	3	
11	LW	(Brazil)	Santin	37	43	16	9	5	32	11	2	
7	CF	(Brazil)	Aílton	29	42	18	9	3	29	11	4	4
9	CF	(Denmark)	Nordstrand	28	42	20	9	3	29	16	4	1
24	RW	(Czech Republic)	Sionko	19	37	5	9	1	23	4	5	
25	CB	(Denmark)	Zanka	25	34		10		20		4	
18	CF	(Brazil)	Júnior	5	18	11	6	6	9	3	3	2
14	SS	(Senegal)	N'Doye	7	16	5	2		11	2	3	3
20	AM	(Denmark)	Vingaard	6	16	3	2	2	12	1	2	
10	LW	(Denmark) (Greenland)	Grønkjær	10	14	3	1		13	3		
3	LB	(Denmark)	N. Jensen	9	14	1	3		7		4	1
12	CB	(Sweden)	Larsson	10	12		2		8		2	
41	GK	(Australia)	Coe	3	4		1		2		1	
29	RB	(Denmark)	D. Jensen		4		1		1		2	
6	DM	(Denmark)	Würtz		3		2		1			
21	GK	(Sweden)	Wiland	3	3				1		2	
26	MF	(Denmark)	Delaney	1	2						2	
30	CB	(Denmark)	Albrechtsen		1		1					
28	CM	(Denmark)	Laudrup		1						1	
22	CM	(Denmark)	Özdoğan		1						1	
26	CB	(Denmark)	Hansen									
27	DM	(Denmark)	Neestrup									

Last updated: 31 May
Source: FCK.dk
Ordered by Starting 11 then appearances
0 shown as blank

=== Players in / out ===
==== In ====
No.	Pos.	Nat.	Name	Age	EU	Moving from	Type	Transfer window	Ends	Transfer fee	Source
29	RB	(Denmark)	D. Jensen	19	EU	Youth system	Promoted	Summer	2011	Youth system	FCK.dk
30	CB	(Denmark)	Albrechtsen	18	EU	Youth system	Promoted	Summer	2010	Youth system	FCK.dk
22	CM	(Denmark)	Bertolt	24	EU	Viborg FF	End of loan	Summer	2009	n/a	FCK.dk
16	CM	(Denmark)	Kristensen	25	EU	Nordsjælland	Transfer	Summer	2012	Undisclosed	FCK.dk
11	LW	(Brazil)	Santin	27	Non-EU	Kalmar FF (Sweden)	Transfer	Summer	2013	DKK 15,000,000	FCK.dk
12	CB	(Sweden)	Larsson	24	EU	Halmstads BK (Sweden)	Transfer	Summer	2013	DKK 15,000,000	FCK.dk
21	GK	(Sweden)	Wiland	27	EU	IF Elfsborg (Sweden)	Transfer	Winter	2013	DKK 8,000,000	FCK.dk
20	AM	(Denmark)	Vingaard	23	EU	Esbjerg fB	Transfer	Winter	2012	DKK 8,000,000	FCK.dk
14	SS	(Senegal)	N'Doye	23	EU	OFI (Greece)	Transfer	Winter	2013	DKK 15,000,000	FCK.dk

==== Out ====
No.	Pos.	Nat.	Name	Age	EU	Moving to	Type	Transfer window	Transfer fee	Source
11	CF	(Sweden)	Allbäck	34	EU	Örgryte IS (Sweden)	Contract ended	Summer	Free	OIS.se
8	RM	(Denmark)	Silberbauer	26	EU	Utrecht (Netherlands)	Contract ended	Summer	Free	FC-Utrecht.nl
29	CF	(Denmark)	Qvist	21	EU	Lyngby Boldklub	Contract ended	Summer	Free	Lyngby-Boldklub.dk
14	CB	(Denmark)	Gravgaard	30	EU	Nantes (France)	Transfer	Summer	DKK 29,000,000	FCNA.fr
22	CM	(Denmark)	Bertolt	24	EU	SønderjyskE	Transfer	Summer	DKK 1,000,000	SoenderjyskE.dk
26	CB	(Denmark)	Hansen	21	EU	Frem	Contract ended	Winter	Free	BKFrem.dk
28	CM	(Denmark)	Laudrup	19	EU	Herfølge Boldklub	Transfer	Winter	Undisclosed	HB.dk
6	DM	(Denmark)	Würtz	25	EU	Vejle B	Loan	Winter	n/a	Vejle-Boldklub.dk
18	FW	(Brazil)	Júnior	32	Non-EU	Nordsjælland	Loan	Winter	n/a	FCN.dk
41	GK	(Australia)	Coe	24	Non-EU	Örgryte IS (Sweden)	Loan	Winter	n/a	OIS.se

Last updated: 14 March

== Club ==
=== Coaching staff ===
Position	Staff
Manager	(Norway) Ståle Solbakken
Assistant manager	(Norway) Bård Wiggen
Goalkeeping coach	(Denmark) Per Wind
Fitness coach	(Denmark) Anders Storskov
Chief scout	(Denmark) Lars Højer

Last updated: 17 June
Source: F.C. Copenhagen

=== Kit ===
Supplier: Kappa
Sponsor(s): Carlsberg

Home; Domestic	Away; Domestic	Home; Europe	Away 1 Europe	Away 2 Europe

Source: FCK.dk

=== Other information ===
Chairman	(Denmark) Flemming Østergaard
Sport director	(Denmark) Carsten V. Jensen
Ground (capacity and dimensions)	Parken (34,098* / 105x68 m)

Updated to match played 17 June
Source: F.C. Copenhagen and Parken Stadium

*During rebuilt

== Competitions ==
=== Overall ===
Competition	Started round	Current position / round	Final position / round	First match	Last match
Danish Superliga	—	—	1st	21 July	31 May
UEFA Cup	First qualifying round	—	Round of 32	17 July	26 February
Danish Cup	Third round	—	Final	27 September	21 May

Updated to match played 24 May
Source: Competitions

=== Danish Superliga ===
==== Classification ====
Pos	Team	Pld	W	D	L	GF	GA	GD	Pts	Qualification or relegation
1	Copenhagen (C)	33	23	5	5	67	26	+41	74	Qualification to Champions League second qualifying round
2	Odense	33	21	6	6	65	31	+34	69	Qualification to Europa League third qualifying round (Note: Because F.C. Copenhagen, winners of 2008–09 Danish Cup, also won the league, Odense BK as league runners-up earned a spot in the third while cup runners-up AaB qualified for the second qualifying round of the UEFA Europa League.)
3	Brøndby	33	21	5	7	55	31	+24	68	Qualification to Europa League second qualifying round
4	Midtjylland	33	16	7	10	55	46	+9	55	
5	Randers	33	11	13	9	52	50	+2	46	Qualification to Europa League first qualifying round (Note: Denmark was ranked second in the UEFA Fair Play Ranking and thereby earned an additional Europa League spot, with the winners of national Fair Play competition entering in the first qualifying round of the UEFA Europa League. That spot was granted to Randers FC because they were the best team in the national Fair Play competition which has not already qualified for Europe.)

Source: Danish Superliga
Rules for classification: 1) points; 2) goal difference; 3) number of goals scored
(C) Champions

==== Results summary ====
Overall								Home						Away					
Pld	W	D	L	GF	GA	GD	Pts	W	D	L	GF	GA	GD	W	D	L	GF	GA	GD
33	23	5	5	67	26	+41	74	14	2	1	42	14	+28	9	3	4	25	12	+13

Last updated: 31 May.
Source: Danish Football Association

==== Results by round ====
Round	1	2	3	4	5	6	7	8	9	10	11	12	13	14	15	16	17	18	19	20	21	22	23	24	25	26	27	28	29	30	31	32	33
Ground	H	A	A	H	H	A	H	H	A	A	H	A	H	A	H	A	H	A	A	H	H	A	A	H	A	H	A	H	H	A	H	A	H
Result	W	D	D	W	W	L	W	W	W	W	D	D	W	W	W	L	W	W	W	L	W	W	W	W	L	W	W	W	W	L	W	W	D

Updated to match(es) played on 31 May. Source: Competitive Matches
A = Away; H = Home; W = Win; D = Draw; L = Loss

== Matches ==
=== Competitive ===
Game	Date	Tournament	Round	Ground	Opponent	Score^{1}	TV	Report
1	17 July	UEFA Cup	First qualifying round	AR (Northern Ireland)	Cliftonville (Northern Ireland)	4–0	–	Report / Report link; Kick off / 19:45 BST; Attendance / 800; Referee / (Bulgaria) Hristo Ristoskov; Copenhagen / Cliftonville; 22' Nørregaard; 67' Júnior; 79' Pospěch; 82' Júnior / (yellow card) 47' Smyth
2	21 July	Danish Superliga	1	H	Esbjerg fB	1–0	TV 2 Sport	Report / Report link; Kick off / 19:00 CEST; Attendance / 15,150; Referee / Michael Svendsen; Copenhagen / Esbjerg fB; (yellow card) 39' Nørregaard; 73' Sionko; (yellow card) 88' N. Jensen; (yellow card) 90+2' Wendt
3	27 July	Danish Superliga	2	A	Randers FC	1–1	TV3+	Report / Report link; Kick off / 17:30 CEST; Attendance / 7,328; Referee / Lars Christoffersen; Copenhagen / Randers FC; 83' Júnior; (yellow card) 84' Júnior / 42' Buval
4	31 July	UEFA Cup	First qualifying round	H	Cliftonville (Northern Ireland)	7–0	TV3+	Report / Report link; Kick off / 20:00; Attendance / 10,695; Referee / Manuel Gräfe; Copenhagen / Cliftonville; 23' Aílton; 25' Júnior; 45' Hutchinson; 46' Kvist; 55' (pen.) Nordstrand; 57' Kristensen; 60' Júnior / (yellow card) 41' O'Hara; (yellow card) 53' Scanell
5	4 August	Danish Superliga	3	A	SønderjyskE	1–1	TV 2 Sport	Report / Report link; Kick off / 19:30 CEST; Attendance / 5,721; Referee / Peter Rasmussen; Copenhagen / SønderjyskE; 5' Hutchinson; (yellow card) 45' Pospěch / (yellow card) 57' Bødker; 68' Egholm
6	10 August	Danish Superliga	4	A	AGF	1–0	TV3+	Report / Report link; Kick off / 17:30 CEST; Attendance / 16,240; Referee / Emil Laursen; Copenhagen / AGF; 19' Nordstrand / (yellow card) 30' Lucena; (yellow card) 44' Thomassen; (yellow card) 68' Blicher
7	14 August	UEFA Cup	Second qualifying round	H	Lillestrøm (Norway)	3–1	TV3+	Report / Report link; Kick off / 20:00 CEST; Attendance / 13,099; Referee / Johan Verbist; Copenhagen / Lillestrøm; Santin 2'; Santin (yellow card) 54'; Júnior 79'; Nordstrand 86' / Brenne (yellow card) 52'; Pedersen (yellow card) 57'; Kippe 90'
8	17 August	Danish Superliga	5	H	Midtjylland	3–1	TV 2 Sport	Report / Report link; Kick off / 16:05 CEST; Attendance / 17,321; Referee / Anders Hermansen; Copenhagen / Midtjylland; 31' Santin; 44' Kvist; (yellow card) 51' Pospěch; 71' Kvist / (yellow card) 30' Christensen; (yellow card) 51' Babatunde; (yellow card) 63' Poulsen; 80' Borring
9	28 August	UEFA Cup	Second qualifying round	A (Norway)	Lillestrøm (Norway)	4–2	Kanal 5	Report / Report link; Kick off / 19:00 CEST; Attendance / 2,502; Referee / Benardino Gonzalez Vazquez; Copenhagen / Lillestrøm; Santin 10'; Pospěch (yellow card) 20'; Aílton 24'; Hutchinson 78'; Júnior 87' / Occean 30'; Brenne 76'
10	31 August	Danish Superliga	6	A	Brøndby	0–1	TV3+	Report / Report link; Kick off / 17:30 CEST; Attendance / 22,345; Referee / Claus Bo Larsen; Copenhagen / Brøndby; / Kristiansen 24'; Wass (yellow card) 74'; Lorentzen (yellow card) 90'
11	18 September	UEFA Cup	First round	A (Russia)	FC Moscow (Russia)	2–1	TV3+	Report / Report link; Kick off / 18:00 MST; Referee / Carlo Bertolini; Copenhagen / FC Moscow; Nordstrand 45+1' (pen.); Pospěch (yellow card) 76'; Kvist (yellow card) 86'; Sionko 90+3' / Jop (yellow card) 45'; Kuzmin (yellow card) 46'; Samedov 90+1'
12	21 September	Danish Superliga	8	H	AaB	3–0	TV3+	Report / Report link; Kick off / 17:30 CEST; Attendance / 24,410; Referee / Michael Svendsen; Copenhagen / AaB; Nørregaard (yellow card) 31'; Hutchinson 42'; Beauchamp 54' (o.g.); Aílton 81' / Pedersen (yellow card) 25'; Beauchamp (yellow card) 53'
13	24 September	Danish Superliga	7	H	Nordsjælland	2–1	TV 2 Sport	Report / Report link; Kick off / 20:15 CEST; Attendance / 15,194; Referee / Peter Rasmussen; Copenhagen / Nordsjælland; Nordstrand 15' (pen.); Hutchinson 34' / Lundberg (yellow card) 15'; Cagara (yellow card) 41'; Pedersen 87'
14	27 September	Danish Cup	Third round	A	Vestsjælland (Denmark)	0–4	TV3+	Report / Report link; Kick off / 17:00 CEST; Attendance / 2,000; Referee / Anders Hermansen; Copenhagen / Vestsjælland; N. Jensen (yellow card) 50'; Kvist 56'; Júnior 67' (pen.); Aílton 84'; Aílton 88' / S. Jensen (yellow card) 27'; Mikkelsen (yellow card) 53'
15	2 October	UEFA Cup	First round	H	FC Moscow (Russia)	1–1	TV3+	Report / Report link; Kick off / 20:45 CEST; Attendance / 18,238; Referee / Serge Gumienny; Copenhagen / FC Moscow; Kvist (yellow card) 40'; Sheshukov 54' (o.g.) / Bracamonte 37'; Godunok (yellow card) 61'; Bystrov (yellow card) 66'; Sheshukov (yellow card) 83'; Nababkin (yellow card) 90'
16	6 October	Danish Superliga	9	A	Vejle B	3–0	TV 2 Sport	Report / Report link; Kick off / 19:00 CEST; Attendance / 8,545; Referee / Michael Johansen; Copenhagen / Vejle B; Sionko 35'; Nordstrand 55'; Wendt 87' / Nielsen (yellow card) 66'; Priske (yellow card) 68'
17	18 October	Danish Superliga	10	A	Horsens	1–0	TV3+	Report / Report link; Kick off / 17:00 CEST; Attendance / 5,465; Referee / Claus Bo Larsen; Copenhagen / Horsens; Zdeněk Pospěch 51'
18	23 October	UEFA Cup	Group stage	H	Saint-Étienne (France)	1–3	TV3+	Report / Report link; Kick off / 20:45 CEST; Attendance / 17,187; Referee / Craig Alexander Thomson; Copenhagen / Saint-Étienne; Santin 59' (pen.) / Gomis 2'; Dernis (yellow card) 16'; Perrin 37'; Monsoreau (yellow card) 42'; Tavlaridis (yellow card) 59'; Payet 65'
19	26 October	Danish Superliga	11	H	OB	0–0	TV3+	Report / Report link; Kick off / 17:30 CET; Attendance / 26,073; Referee / Nicolai Vollquartz; Copenhagen / OB; / Djemba-Djemba (yellow card) 40'; Andreasen (yellow card) 44'
20	30 October	Danish Cup	Fourth round	A	Næstved BK	3–0	TV 2 Sport	Report / Report link; Kick off / 18:15 CET; Attendance / 3,412; Referee / Emil Laursen; Copenhagen / Næstved BK; Aílton 19'; Laursen (yellow card) 57'; Aílton 76'; Júnior (yellow card) 77'; Júnior 87' / Balling (yellow card) 90'
21	2 November	Danish Superliga	12	A	Vejle B	1–1	TV3+	Report / Report link; Kick off / 17:30 CET; Attendance / 5,545; Referee / Michael Svendsen; Copenhagen / Vejle B; Nordstrand 25'; Christiansen (yellow card) 28'; Zanka (yellow card) 80' / Olesen (yellow card) 25'; Kielstrup 27'
22	6 November	UEFA Cup	Group stage	A (Spain)	Valencia (Spain)	1–1	La Sexta	Report / Report link; Kick off / 21:30 CET; Referee / Knut Kircher; Copenhagen / Valencia; Santin 85'; Pospěch (yellow card) 90' / Morientes 61'
23	9 November	Danish Superliga	13	H	SønderjyskE	4–0	TV 2 Sport	Report / Report link; Kick off / 16:05 CET; Attendance / 13,045; Referee / Henning Jensen; Copenhagen / SønderjyskE; Nørregaard 8'; Sionko 41'; Santin (yellow card) 58'; Nordstrand 72'; Júnior 90+2' / Østli (yellow card) 60'
24	12 November	Danish Cup	Fifth round	A	Lyngby Boldklub	0–0 (4-2 pen.)	TV3+	Report / Report link; Kick off / 18:00 CET; Attendance / 2,421; Referee / Anders Hermansen; Copenhagen / Lyngby Boldklub; Nordstrand (yellow card) 99' / Fischer (yellow card) 10'; Bjelland (yellow card) 79'; Melchiorsen (yellow card) 90'; Hamalainen (yellow card) 111'
25	16 November	Danish Superliga	14	A	Midtjylland	0–3	TV3+	Report / Report link; Kick off / 17:30 CET; Attendance / 10,606; Referee / Claus Bo Larsen; Copenhagen / Midtjylland; Kvist 2'; Aílton 47'; Aílton 53'
26	23 November	Danish Superliga	15	H	AGF	2–1	TV3+	Report / Report link; Kick off / 17:30 CET; Attendance / 14,240; Referee / Anders Hermansen; Copenhagen / AGF; Hutchinson (yellow card) 59'; Nordstrand 66'; Santin (yellow card) 74'; Santin 75' / Rafael 52'
27	30 November	Danish Superliga	16	A	AaB	1–3	TV3+	Report / Report link; Kick off / 17:30 CET; Referee / Nicolai Vollquartz; Copenhagen / AaB; Santin 9'; Wendt (yellow card) 15' / Saganowski 9'; Risgård 27'; Enevoldsen (yellow card) 67'; Cacá 70'; Due (yellow card) 88'
28	4 December	UEFA Cup	Group stage	H	Rosenborg (Norway)	1–1	TV3+	Report / Report link; Kick off / 20:45 CET; Attendance / 18,184; Referee / Thomas Einweller; Copenhagen / Rosenborg; Hutchinson (yellow card) 37'; Antonsson 85'; Kristensen (yellow card) 90' / Lago (yellow card) 22'; Iversen 33'; Dorsin (yellow card) 56'
29	7 December	Danish Superliga	17	H	Horsens	5–2	TV3+	Report / Report link; Kick off / 17:30 CET; Attendance / 11286; Referee / Lars Christoffersen; Copenhagen / Horsens; Santin 24'; Nordstrand 37'; Nordstrand 41' (pen.); Sionko (yellow card) 42'; Santin 67'; Júnior 90' / Macena 7'; Rasmussen (yellow card) 41'; Lodberg 90' (pen.)
30	17 December	UEFA Cup	Group stage	A (Belgium)	Club Brugge (Belgium)	1–0	TV3+	Report / Report link; Kick off / 20:45 CET; Referee / Darko Ceferin; Copenhagen / Club Brugge; Kristensen (yellow card) 33'; Santin 58' / Geraerts (yellow card) 44'
31	19 February	UEFA Cup	Round of 32	H	Manchester City (England)	2–2	TV3+	Report / Report link; Kick off / 20:05 CET; Attendance / 30,159; Referee / Pavel Kralovec; Copenhagen / Manchester City; Aílton 56'; Vingaard 90' / Onouha 29'; Bellamy (yellow card) 43'; Ireland 61'; Richards (yellow card) 83'
32	26 February	UEFA Cup	Round of 32	A (England)	Manchester City (England)	1–2	TV3+	Report / Report link; Kick off / 19:45 GMT; Attendance / 26,018; Referee / Selçuk Dereli; Copenhagen / Manchester City; Kristensen (yellow card) 36'; Wendt (yellow card) 62'; Vingaard 90' / Bellamy 73'; Bellamy 80'
33	2 March	Danish Superliga	18	A	Brøndby	1–0	TV 2 Sport	Report / Report link; Kick off / 19:00 CET; Attendance / 26,014; Referee / Claus Bo Larsen; Copenhagen / Brøndby; Aílton 78' / Gíslason (yellow card) 25' v.d.Schaaf (yellow card) 43'
34	7 March	Danish Superliga	19	A	Randers FC	3–0	TV3+	Report / Report link; Kick off / 17:00 CET; Attendance / 8,155; Referee / Henrik N. Kragh; Copenhagen / Randers FC; Santin 7'; Laursen (yellow card) 29'; Santin 47'; N'Doye (yellow card) 86'; N'Doye 88' / Møller Pedersen (yellow card) 15'; Olesen (yellow card) 33'
35	15 March	Danish Superliga	20	H	Esbjerg fB	0–2	TV 2 Sport	Report / Report link; Kick off / 14:00 CET; Attendance / 20,148; Referee / Jesper Bæk Overgaard; Copenhagen / Esbjerg fB; Larsson (yellow card) 27'; N'Doye (yellow card) 83'; Larsson (yellow card) 86' (yellow-red card) / Šabanović (yellow card) 40'; Rieks 45'; Lange 87'
36	22 March	Danish Superliga	21	H	OB	2–1	TV3+	Report / Report link; Kick off / 17:30 CET; Attendance / 21,328; Referee / Nicolai Vollquartz; Copenhagen / OB; Kvist (yellow card) 7'; Hutchinson 50'; Nordstrand 83'; Zanka (yellow card) 90' / Hansen (yellow card) 10'; Ruud 47'; Demba-Nyrén (yellow card) 57'; Absalonsen (yellow card) 90'
37	4 April	Danish Superliga	22	A	Nordsjælland	3–0	TV3+	Report / Report link; Kick off / 17:15 CEST; Attendance / 8,443; Referee / Thomas Vejlgaard; Copenhagen / Nordsjælland; Santin 13'; Aílton 63'; Nordstrand 88' / Dahl (yellow card) 69'
38	8 April	Danish Superliga	23	A	SønderjyskE	2–1	TV3+	Report / Report link; Kick off / 18:00 CEST; Attendance / 3,143; Referee / Emil Laursen; Copenhagen / SønderjyskE; Santin 16'; Vingaard (yellow card) 86'; N'Doye 90' / Kjærulff (yellow card) 8'; Ottesen 42'
39	13 April	Danish Superliga	24	H	Vejle B	4–1	TV3+	Report / Report link; Kick off / 17:30 CEST; Attendance / 23463; Referee / Michael Johansen; Copenhagen / Vejle B; Grønkjær 12'; Aílton 35'; Santin 58'; Sionko 89' / Würtz (yellow card) 64'; Salou 82'
40	16 April	Danish Cup	Semi finals	A	Nordvest FC	4–0	TV3+	Report / Report link; Kick off / 18:30 CEST; Attendance / 6,132; Referee / Michael Svendsen; Copenhagen / Nordvest FC; Jensen 33'; Nørregaard 53'; N'Doye 82'; N'Doye 90' / Aslan (yellow card) 34'; Håkansson (yellow card) 34'; Sømmergaard (yellow card) 82'
41	19 April	Danish Superliga	25	A	AGF	0–1	TV3+	Report / Report link; Kick off / 17:30 CEST; Attendance / 10,803; Referee / Peter Rasmussen; Copenhagen / AGF; / White (yellow card) 10'; Budtz 86'
42	22 April	Danish Superliga	26	H	Midtjylland	2–1	TV3+	Report / Report link; Kick off / 20:00 CEST; Attendance / 16,749; Referee / Claus Bo Larsen; Copenhagen / Midtjylland; Hutchinson 6'; Jesper Grønkjær (yellow card) 49'; Nordstrand 72' / Borring 37'; Florescu (yellow card) 69'; Marčić (yellow card) 71'
43	25 April	Danish Superliga	27	A	Horsens	2–0	TV3+	Report / Report link; Kick off / 17:00 CEST; Attendance / 4,838; Referee / Emil Laursen; Copenhagen / Horsens; Eckersley 5' (o.g.); Aílton 38'; Zanka (yellow card) 68' / Lawan (yellow card) 28'; Friis (yellow card) 33'; Petersen (yellow card) 85'; Macena (yellow card) 89'
44	28 April	Danish Cup	Semi finals	H	Nordvest FC	2–1	TV3+	Report / Report link; Kick off / 18:00 CEST; Attendance / 6,916; Referee / Anders Hermansen; Copenhagen / Nordvest FC; N'Doye 18'; Nordstrand 56' / Håkansson 1'
45	3 May	Danish Superliga	28	H	AaB	3–0	TV3+	Report / Report link; Kick off / 17:30 CEST; Attendance / 20,717; Referee / Michael Svendsen; Copenhagen / AaB; Kvist 62'; Pospěch 72'; Nordstrand 87' / Olfers (yellow card) 27'
46	9 May	Danish Superliga	29	H	Nordsjælland	3–1	TV3+	Report / Report link; Kick off / 17:00 CEST; Attendance / 20,021; Referee / Claus Bo Larsen; Copenhagen / Nordsjælland; Nørregaard (yellow card) 41'; Nordstrand 51'; Nordstrand 70'; Aílton 81' / Bernburg 64'
47	13 May	Danish Superliga	30	A	OB	2–3	TV3+	Report / Report link; Kick off / 20:00 CEST; Attendance / 15,486; Referee / Anders Hermansen; Copenhagen / OB; Aílton 47'; Aílton (yellow card) 62'; Vingaard 83'; N'Doye (yellow card) 85' / Demba-Nyrén 18'; Helveg (yellow card) 30'; Hansen 37'; Demba-Nyrén 54'
48	17 May	Danish Superliga	31	H	Brøndby	4–0	TV3+	Report / Report link; Kick off / 17:30 CEST; Attendance / 32,408; Referee / Peter Rasmussen; Copenhagen / Brøndby; Grønkjær 3'; Grønkjær (yellow card) 38'; Aílton 45'; Aílton 71'; Wendt 74' / Randrup (yellow card) 12'; Farnerud (yellow card) 60'
49	21 May	Danish Cup	Final	N	AaB	1–0	TV3+	Report / Report link; Kick off / 15:00 CEST; Attendance / 29,249; Referee / Peter Rasmussen; Copenhagen / AaB; Kvist 31' / Kristensen (yellow card) 28'; Johansson (yellow card) 74'; Risgård (yellow card) 81'; Augustinussen (yellow card) 90'
50	24 May	Danish Superliga	32	A	Esbjerg fB	1–0	TV3+	Report / Report link; Kick off / 17:00 CEST; Attendance / 12,081; Referee / Lars Christoffersen; Copenhagen / Esbjerg fB; Kvist (yellow card) 28'; Santin 45' (pen.); Aílton (yellow card) 45' / Vendelboe (yellow card) 59'; Høgh (yellow card) 80'
51	31 May	Danish Superliga	33	H	Randers FC	3–3	TV3+	Report / Report link; Kick off / 17:00 CEST; Attendance / 32,856; Referee / Claus Bo Larsen; Copenhagen / Randers FC; Nordstrand 33' (pen.); Nordstrand 79' (pen.); Hutchinson 88' / Nygaard 19'; Sane 45'; Nygaard 46'; Ellegaard (yellow card) 79'; Grahn (yellow card) 88'

Last updated: 31 May
Source: FCK.dk
^{1}F.C. Copenhagen goals come first.
National flags for Ground and Opponent columns are only shown when different from that of F.C. Copenhagen.
M = Match; Ground: H = Home, A = Away, N = Neutral, HR = Home replacement, AR = Away replacement.

=== Friendlies ===
Match	Date	Competition or tour	Ground	Opponent	Score^{1}	Scorers	GD
1^{2}	28 June	Scandlines Invitation	HR	Zenit St. Petersburg (Russia)	2 - 0	Aílton 25'; Nordstrand 36' (pen.)	2
2	2 July	—	HR	Lyngby Boldklub	3 - 1	Nørregaard 3'; Júnior 25'; Aílton 64'	2
3	8 July	Austrian tour	N (Austria)	Wisła Kraków (Poland)	1 - 1	Laursen 2'	0
4	12 July	Austrian tour	N (Austria)	Hertha BSC (Germany)	0 - 0		0
5	19 August	Anniversary match	A	Taarbæk IF	8 - 0	Delaney 6'; Kristensen 14'; Aílton 42'; Aílton 43'; Christiansen 50'; Delaney 53'; Aílton 55'; Christiansen 88'	8
6	10 October	—	HR	Trelleborgs FF (Sweden)	5 - 0	Aílton 4 Laudrup 1	5
7	26 November	—	H	Frem (Denmark)	6 - 0	Timm 25'; Júnior 31'; Júnior 49'; Erdem 53'; Christiansen 80'; Júnior 85'	6
8	27 January	—	HR	Malmö FF (Sweden)	4 - 1	Nordstrand 29'; Vingaard 30'; Vingaard 85'; Santin 89'	3
9	1 February	Spain tour	N (Spain)	Dynamo Moscow (Russia)	1 - 0	Santin 9'	1
10	4 February	Spain tour	AR (Spain)	Cartagena (Spain)	2 - 0	Nordstrand 78'; Sionko 82'	2
11	11 February	—	HR	Lyngby Boldklub	4 - 0	Aílton 19'; Santin (p.) 38'; Nørregaard 55'; N'Doye 68'	4
12	14 February	—	HR	Stabæk (Norway)	4 - 3	Santin 6'; Santin (p.) 13'; Kristensen (p.) 58'; Vingaard 78'	1
13	21 February	—	H	Helsingborgs IF (Sweden)	5 - 2	Nordstrand (p.) 22'; Nordstrand (p.) 58'; Nordstrand 61'; Nordstrand 63'; Nordstrand 88'	3
14	26 March	—	HR	Nordsjælland	0 - 3		-3

Last updated: 26 March
Source: F.C. Copenhagen
^{1}F.C. Copenhagen goals come first.
Country's flag depict country of foreign team to that of F.C. Copenhagen.
^{2} TV: TV3+
Ground: H = Home; A = Away; N = Neutral; HR = Home replacement; AR = Away replacement; GD = Goal difference
