= 2007–08 F.C. Copenhagen season =

F.C. Copenhagen
2007–08 season
- Chairman: Flemming Østergaard
- Manager: Ståle Solbakken
- Danish Superliga: 3rd
- Danish Cup: Semi-finals
- UEFA Champions League: Third qualifying round
- UEFA Cup: Group stage
- Top goalscorer: League: Morten Nordstrand (9 goals); All: Marcus Allbäck; Morten Nordstrand (12 each)
- Highest home attendance: 39,711 (vs S.L. Benfica, 29 August 2007)
- Lowest home attendance: 14,071 (vs Viborg FF, 28 July 2007)

FCK competed in the 2007–08 season in the Danish Superliga, Danish Cup, UEFA Champions League and UEFA Cup.

== Competitions ==
In this season, F.C. Copenhagen participated in the Danish Superliga, Danish Cup, UEFA Champions League and UEFA Cup.

=== Danish Superliga ===
FCK's Superliga campaign began on 2007-07-18, when they played away at Farum Park against FC Nordsjælland. The match was equal, but in the added time of the second half, substituted Issey Nakajima-Farran scored the winning goal for the home team.

The second match was also away, against the UEFA Intertoto Cup winners, AaB. This time FCK also were down with a goal, but in the 75th minute, Brede Hangeland made it equal, 1–1.

After the unsuccessful beginning followed 7 victories and 4 draws before losing home to Randers FC on 2007-10-28. After a massive pressure from FCK, Kenneth Møller Pedersen scored on penalty kick for Randers in the end of first half, and although FCK had most of the play, they were not able to score in the game.

FCK ended the autumn with 2 victories and 2 drawn matches, and when they drew against local rivals Brøndby IF in the last match of the autumn, took AaB the leading position of the league from FCK, who spend the winter placed 2nd.

In the autumn Copenhagen has been criticised for not scoring enough goals, when they were only able to score 23 times in 18 fights. That means 7 teams have scored more goals than FCK, who is equal with Brøndby IF on the ninth place.

The spring season began on 2008-03-16 with a 4–1 victory against Lyngby Boldklub at Lyngby Stadion.

The spring was disappointing for FCK as they lost 5 matches and drew two matches. A period from March 31 to April 27 was without any victories for the defending champions.

On May 15 was AaB guaranteed the championship. At the time was Copenhagen placed 2nd. Three days later waited the New Firm derby against Brøndby away from home. When FCK lost this match 1–2 and FC Midtjylland won 3–2 against AGF, Midtjylland took over the 2nd place.

FCK could still get the silver medal, if they won the last match of the season against Lyngby, while Midtjylland lost points against FC Nordsjælland. Although Copenhagen won 3–1, FC Midtjylland also won 3–0, and FCK ended with the bronze medals.

=== Danish Cup ===
In the Danish Cup FCK started in third round. Here they drew FC Fredericia from the 1st Division. The match was played on 2007-09-26 at Fredericia Ny Stadion. Aílton scored the first goal of the match after just 4 minutes, but only 14 minutes later made Fredericia's Rasmus Katholm it equal again. In second half Libor Sionko showed his qualities with two goals, which determined the match.

In the fourth-round draw, came the 2nd Division West side Varde IF up from the hat. This match was played on 2007-10-31 at Sydbank Stadion, where the most of Varde's stores closed, so the inhabitants could go to football. In the first half showed FCK their strength with 4 goals in 34 minutes, which determined the match.

On 2008-03-08 FCK faced the 1st Division team Næstved BK. This match was disfigured by spectator riots in the first half. The match on the pitch ended 2–0 to Copenhagen after two Brazilian goals by Aílton Almeida and José Júnior.

In the semifinals Copenhagen drew Esbjerg fB. The first match at Parken EfB won 1–0 on a goal by Michaël Murcy in the second half.

In the second leg scored Mathias "Zanka" for Copenhagen, in a match FCK dominated. In the extra time scored Jesper Bech for Esbjerg and Jesper Grønkjær for FCK. In the last minute of the extra time score Jesper Lange the goal, that sent EfB to the final. Manager Ståle Solbakken was so frustrated that he kicked some water bottles, which led to exclusion from the bench and a ban in the next Superliga match.

=== UEFA Champions League ===
In the UEFA Champions League was FCK seeded in the second qualifying round, where their campaign started. Here they drew Israeli Beitar Jerusalem. In the first match at Parken Stadium on 2007-07-31 won FCK 1–0 on a goal in the ninth minutes, by Marcus Allbäck, called the "international goalscorer", because of his many important goals in European matches.

In the return match at Teddy Stadium was exiting as Barak Yitzhaki scored for the home team, so the aggregate goal score was 1–1 as the 90 minutes had passed. This meant that the clash were going in extra time and again showed Allbäck his international strength as he scored the winning goal after just 7 minutes.

In the third qualifying round was S.L. Benfica drawn. FCK played also against Benfica in the 2006–07 season in the Champions League group stage. This time started FCK away at Estádio da Luz, but in defiance of a good effort Rui Costa did the evil to the Danes, when he scored twice, while Atiba Hutchinson scored for FCK.

To qualify for the group stage Copenhagen needed a 1–0 win at home in the second leg. FCK played a fabulous match, but when Kostas Katsouranis scored after 17 minutes for Benfica, was the European dream ended. By way of consolation entered the Danish champions the UEFA Cup first round.

=== UEFA Cup ===
F.C. Copenhagen entered the first round of the UEFA Cup as the best of the unseeded teams. Ironical they drew the team with the highest UEFA coefficient of the possible teams, RC Lens. The battle started on 2007-09-19 at Stade Félix-Bollaert and after just 5 minutes of play scored Marcus Allbäck an important away goal. Lens pressed the rest of the game and in second half scored Aruna Dindane for the home team to the score 1–1.

In the second leg scored Eric Carrière after just 14 minutes of play for RC Lens, but with fight, will and high morale succeeded FCK in coming back in the game by a Marcus Allbäck scoring in second half, and in the extra time scored Jesper Grønkjær on a penalty kick, after captain Michael Gravgaard was shown the red card.

In the group stage were FCK in group B with Panathinaikos F.C., FC Lokomotiv Moscow, Atlético Madrid and Aberdeen F.C. The match against Panathinaikos was played at Parken Stadium and although the big expectations to the home team, won the Greeks on a goal by Dame N'Doye. In the matched missed Hjalte Nørregaard a penalty kick.

The second match was away against Lokomotiv Moscow at Lokomotiv Stadium, who came to the group stage by knocking out fellow Danes, FC Midtjylland. In the match were Copenhagen dominating, but the victory was only secured by a penalty goal by Morten Nordstrand.

The last home match were against mighty Atlético Madrid, which showed quality as they won 2–0 against F.C. Copenhagen. After the match confessed the players of FCK that Atlético was at least one class better than themselves.

Although FCK only had scored a single goal in three matches could they qualify for the round of 32 by a draw against Aberdeen. The match at Pittodrie Stadium were a terrible experience for the Copenhagen players and fans, as they in second half were played out and lost 4–0. Especially Mikael Antonsson, who played instead of banned Brede Hangeland, were vilified after the match, as he were involved in all 4 goals – one of them were an own goal.

FCK ended fourth in the group, and as in the Superliga were they criticized for not scoring enough goals – 1 goal in 4 matches – and it was a penalty kick. F.C. Copenhagen were sent out of Europe.

== Squads ==
The following squads, are lists with all the players, who have played in FC København in the 2007–08 season.

=== First team ===
Note: Flags indicate national team as defined under FIFA eligibility rules; some limited exceptions apply. Players may hold more than one non-FIFA nationality.

No.	Pos.	Nation	Player
1	GK	DEN	Jesper Christiansen
2	DF	CZE	Zdeněk Pospěch (bought from Sparta Prague)
3	DF	DEN	Niclas Jensen
4	MF	DEN	Hjalte Nørregaard
5	DF	NOR	Brede Hangeland (sold to Fulham)
5	DF	DEN	Ulrik Laursen (bought from OB)
6	MF	DEN	Rasmus Würtz
7	FW	BRA	Aílton José Almeida
8	MF	DEN	Michael Silberbauer
9	FW	DEN	Morten Nordstrand
10	MF	DEN	Jesper Grønkjær
11	FW	SWE	Marcus Allbäck (vice-captain)
13	MF	CAN	Atiba Hutchinson

No.	Pos.	Nation	Player
14	DF	DEN	Michael Gravgaard (captain)
15	DF	SWE	Mikael Antonsson
17	DF	SWE	Oscar Wendt
18	FW	BRA	José Júnior (bought from Malmö)
22	MF	DEN	Morten Bertolt (on loan at Viborg)
23	MF	DEN	William Kvist
24	MF	CZE	Libor Sionko
25	DF	DEN	Mathias "Zanka" Jørgensen
26	DF	DEN	Nikolaj Hansen
27	MF	DEN	Jacob Neestrup
28	MF	DEN	Mads Laudrup
29	FW	DEN	Lasse Qvist
41	GK	AUS	Nathan Coe

=== Reserve team ===
Note: Flags indicate national team as defined under FIFA eligibility rules; some limited exceptions apply. Players may hold more than one non-FIFA nationality.

No.	Pos.	Nation	Player
—	GK	DEN	Martin Jacobsen
21	GK	DEN	Frederik Vang Larsen
—	DF	DEN	Rasmus Bogh
—	DF	DEN	Morten Edvold
—	DF	DEN	Danny Jensen
—	DF	DEN	Nicklas Kristensen
—	DF	RSA	Bongumusa Mthethwa
—	DF	DEN	Peter Piil
—	DF	DEN	Mikkel Voge (sold)
—	DF	DEN	Casper Windfeld
—	DF	DEN	Cüneyit Özcan

No.	Pos.	Nation	Player
—	MF	DEN	Dejan Buzakovic
—	MF	DEN	Recep Kocak
—	MF	DEN	Mikkel Linnet (sold)
18	MF	DEN	Kim Tandrup (sold)
—	MF	DEN	Kenneth Thinter
—	MF	DEN	Kevin Bechmann Timm
—	FW	DEN	Mads Aunvig
—	FW	DEN	Thomas Christiansen
—	FW	SWE	Erton Fejzullahu (sold to Mjällby)
—	FW	DEN	Avar Raza

== Transfers ==
=== Players In ===
Date	No.	Player	From	Comments	Link
2007-06-18	28	Mads Laudrup		Youth player – now first team player	
2007-06-20	27	Jacob Neestrup		Youth player – now first team player	
2007-06-21	15	Mikael Antonsson	(Greece) Panathinaikos		
2007-06-26	25	Mathias "Zanka" Jørgensen	B.93		
2007-07-06	9	Morten Nordstrand	Nordsjælland		
2007-07-06	6	Rasmus Würtz	AaB		
2007-07-28	24	Libor Sionko	(Scotland) Rangers		
2008-01-23	2	Zdeněk Pospěch	(Czech Republic) Sparta Prague		
2008-01-31	18	José Júnior	(Sweden) Malmö		
2008-01-31	5	Ulrik Laursen	OB		

=== Players out ===
Date	No.	Player	To	Comments	Link
2007-06-12	6	Tobias Linderoth	(Turkey) Galatasaray		
2007-07-01	2	Lars Jacobsen	(Germany) Nürnberg	end of contract	
2007-07-01	16	Dan Thomassen	(Norway) Vålerenga	end of contract	
2007-07-01	21	Thomas Villadsen	(Netherlands) Emmen	end of contract	
2007-07-01	24	Jeppe Brandrup	Randers	end of contract	
2007-07-01	31	Benny Gall		stopped career	
2007-07-08	9	Fredrik Berglund	(Sweden) Elfsborg		
2008-01-07	22	Morten Bertolt	Viborg	on loan	
2008-01-18	5	Brede Hangeland	(England) Fulham		

== Competition statistics ==
=== Danish Superliga ===
==== Classification ====
Pos	Team	Pld	W	D	L	GF	GA	GD	Pts	Qualification or relegation
1	AaB (C)	33	22	5	6	60	38	+22	71	Qualification to Champions League second qualifying round
2	Midtjylland	33	18	8	7	53	36	+17	62	Qualification to UEFA Cup first qualifying round
3	Copenhagen	33	17	9	7	51	29	+22	60	Qualification to UEFA Cup first qualifying round
4	OB	33	12	16	5	46	27	+19	52	Qualification to Intertoto Cup second round
5	Horsens	33	14	10	9	47	43	+4	52	

Source: Danish Football Association
Rules for classification: 1) points; 2) goal difference; 3) number of goals scored.
(C) Champions

==== Results summary ====
Overall								Home						Away					
Pld	W	D	L	GF	GA	GD	Pts	W	D	L	GF	GA	GD	W	D	L	GF	GA	GD
33	17	9	7	51	29	+22	60	11	4	2	30	12	+18	6	5	5	21	17	+4

Last updated: 24 May.
Source: danskfodbold.com

== Results ==
Results for F.C. Copenhagen for season 2007–2008.

NOTE: scores are written FCK first

Date	Venue	Opponents	Score	Comp	TV	FCK scorers	Match Report*
2007-07-07	GAK's training ground, Graz–Andritz, Austria	(Germany) Kaiserslautern	3–0	F		Aílton, Hutchinson, Grønkjær	FCK
2007-07-10	Sparkassen-Stadion, Gleisdorf, Austria	(Germany) Schalke 04	2–2	F	(Germany) DSF	Gravgaard, Nordstrand	FCK
2007-07-14	Sør Arena, Kristiansand, Norway	(Norway) Start	1–0	F		Aílton	FCK
2007-07-18	Farum Park, Farum	Nordsjælland	0–1	DSL	(Denmark) TV3+		FCK
2007-07-25	Aalborg Stadion, Aalborg	AaB	1–1	DSL	(Denmark) TV3+	Hangeland	FCK
2007-07-28	Parken, Copenhagen	Viborg	3–1	DSL	(Denmark) TV3+	Hutchinson, Nordstrand (2)	FCK
2007-07-31	Parken, Copenhagen	(Israel) Beitar Jerusalem	1–0	CLQ	(Denmark) TV 2	Allbäck	FCK, UEFA
2007-08-04	NRGi Park, Aarhus	AGF	1–0	DSL	(Denmark) TV3+	Hutchinson	FCK
2007-08-07	Teddy Stadium, Jerusalem, Israel	(Israel) Beitar Jerusalem	1–1 (aet)	CLQ	(Denmark) Kanal 5	Allbäck	FCK, UEFA
2007-08-11	Parken, Copenhagen	Esbjerg	5–2	DSL	(Denmark) TV3+	Nørregaard, Gravgaard, Sionko, Nordstrand (2)	FCK
2007-08-14	Estádio da Luz, Lisbon, Portugal	(Portugal) Benfica	1–2	CLQ	(Denmark) TV3+	Hutchinson	FCK, UEFA
2007-08-19	Parken, Copenhagen	Midtjylland	0–0	DSL	(Denmark) TV3+		FCK
2007-08-25	Fionia Park, Odense	OB	0–0	DSL	(Denmark) TV3+		FCK
2007-08-29	Parken, Copenhagen	(Portugal) Benfica	0–1	CLQ	(Denmark) TV 2		FCK, UEFA
2007-09-02	Parken, Copenhagen	Randers	1–0	DSL	(Denmark) TV 2 Sport	Grønkjær	FCK
2007-09-15	Parken, Copenhagen	Horsens	1–0	DSL	(Denmark) TV3+	Nordstrand	FCK
2007-09-19	Stade Félix-Bollaert, Lens, France	(France) Lens	1–1	UC1	(Denmark) TV3+	Allbäck	FCK, UEFA
2007-09-23	Brøndby Stadion, Brøndby	Brøndby	1–0	DSL	(Denmark) TV 2 Sport	Nørregaard	FCK
2007-09-26	Fredericia Ny Stadion, Fredericia	Fredericia	3–1	DC3	(Denmark) TV3+	Aílton, Sionko (2)	FCK
2007-09-29	Parken, Copenhagen	Lyngby	2–0	DSL	(Denmark) TV3+	Sionko, Nørregaard	FCK
2007-10-04	Parken, Copenhagen	(France) Lens	2–1 (aet)	UC1	(Denmark) TV 2	Allbäck, Grønkjær	FCK
2007-10-07	Parken, Copenhagen	Nordsjælland	1–1	DSL	(Denmark) TV3+	Allbäck	FCK
2007-10-20	Aalborg Stadion, Aalborg	AaB	0–0	DSL	(Denmark) TV3+		FCK
2007-10-28	Parken, Copenhagen	Randers	0–1	DSL	(Denmark) TV 2 Sport		FCK
2007-10-31	Sydbank Stadion, Varde	Varde	4–0	DC4	(Denmark) TV 2 Sport	Nordstrand (2), Bojsen (VIF) (og), Zanka	FCK
2007-11-03	NRGi Park, Aarhus	AGF	2–0	DSL	(Denmark) TV3+	Hutchinson, Sionko	FCK
2007-11-08	Parken, Copenhagen	(Greece) Panathinaikos	0–1	UCB	(Denmark) TV 2		FCK, UEFA
2007-11-11	SAS Arena, Herning	Midtjylland	2–2	DSL	(Denmark) TV3+	Allbäck, Antonsson	FCK
2007-11-19	KB's anlæg, Frederiksberg	Nordsjælland	1–1	F		Aílton	FCK
2007-11-24	Parken, Copenhagen	OB	2–1	DSL	(Denmark) TV3+	Allbäck, Hangeland	FCK
2007-11-29	Lokomotiv Stadium, Moscow	(Russia) Lokomotiv Moscow	1–0	UCB	(Denmark) Kanal 5	Nordstrand	FCK, UEFA
2007-12-02	Parken, Copenhagen	Brøndby	1–1	DSL	(Denmark) TV3+	Allbäck	FCK
2007-12-05	Parken, Copenhagen	(Spain) Atlético	0–2	UCB	(Denmark) TV 2		FCK, UEFA
2007-12-12	Parken, Copenhagen	AaB	0–1	F			FCK
2007-12-20	Pittodrie Stadium, Aberdeen	(Scotland) Aberdeen	0–4	UCB	(Denmark) TV3+		FCK, UEFA
2008-01-22	DKB-Arena, Rostock, Germany	(Germany) Hansa Rostock	1–1	F		Allbäck	FCK
2008-02-03	La Manga Club, Los Belones, Spain	(Poland) Legia Warsaw	2–2	F		Aílton, Grønkjær	FCK
2008-02-07	La Manga Club, Los Belones, Spain	(Norway) Brann	0–1	F	(Norway) TV 2 Sport		FCK
2008-02-16	Södertälje Fotbollsarena, Stockholm, Sweden	(Sweden) Djurgården	4–1	F		Sionko, Aílton (2), Júnior	FCK
2008-02-22	KB's anlæg, Frederiksberg	(Norway) Viking	2–2	F		Silberbauer, Allbäck	FCK
2008-02-26	KB's anlæg, Frederiksberg	Nordsjælland	2–2	F		Júnior (2)	FCK
2008-03-01	KB's anlæg, Frederiksberg	(Norway) Stabæk	4–0	F		Allbäck, Aílton, Júnior, Zanka	FCK
2008-03-08	Næstved Stadion, Næstved	Næstved	2–0	DC5	(Denmark) TV3+	Aílton, Júnior	FCK
2008-03-11	KB's anlæg, Frederiksberg	(Sweden) Bunkeflo IF	2–0	F		Nordstrand, Würtz	FCK
2008-03-16	Lyngby Stadion, Kgs. Lyngby	Lyngby	4–1	DSL	(Denmark) TV 2 Sport	Sionko, Pospěch, Zanka, Júnior	FCK
2008-03-19	Blue Water Arena, Esbjerg	Esbjerg	1–2	DSL	(Denmark) TV3+	Grønkjær	FCK
2008-03-22	Parken, Copenhagen	Horsens	1–0	DSL	(Denmark) TV3+	Sionko	FCK
2008-03-31	Viborg Stadion, Viborg	Viborg	3–2	DSL	(Denmark) TV 2 Sport	Nordstrand, Júnior, Grønkjær	FCK
2008-04-06	Parken, Copenhagen	Midtjylland	0–2	DSL	(Denmark) TV3+		FCK
2008-04-09	Parken, Copenhagen	Esbjerg	0–1	DCS	(Denmark) TV 2 Sport		FCK
2008-04-13	Fionia Park, Odense	OB	0–0	DSL	(Denmark) TV3+		FCK
2008-04-16	Blue Water Arena, Esbjerg	Esbjerg	2–2 (aet)	DCS	(Denmark) TV3+	Zanka, Grønkjær	FCK
2008-04-19	Essex Park Randers, Randers	Randers	1–2	DSL	(Denmark) TV3+	Nordstrand	FCK
2008-04-24	Parken, Copenhagen	AGF	1–1	DSL	(Denmark) TV3+	Hutchinson	FCK
2008-04-27	Parken, Copenhagen	Esbjerg	2–1	DSL	(Denmark) TV3+	Gravgaard, Pospěch	FCK
2008-05-05	Casa Arena Horsens, Horsens	Horsens	2–3	DSL	(Denmark) TV 2 Sport	Nordstrand, Allbäck	FCK
2008-05-08	Farum Park, Farum	Nordsjælland	2–1	DSL	(Denmark) TV3+	Hutchinson, Allbäck	FCK
2008-05-12	Parken, Copenhagen	AaB	4–0	DSL	(Denmark) TV3+	Silberbauer, Hutchinson, Nordstrand, Aílton	FCK
2008-05-15	Parken, Copenhagen	Viborg	3–0	DSL	(Denmark) TV3+	Júnior, Aílton (2)	FCK
2008-05-18	Brøndby Stadion, Brøndby	Brøndby	1–2	DSL	(Denmark) TV3+	Allbäck	FCK
2008-05-24	Parken, Copenhagen	Lyngby	3–1	DSL	(Denmark) TV3+	Hutchinson (2), Allbäck	FCK

Key:

- DSL = Danish Superliga
- DC = Danish Cup
- CLQ = UEFA Champions League Qualifier
- UC1 = UEFA Cup 1st Round
- UCB = UEFA Cup Group B
- F = Friendly match

=== Report explanation ===
- FCK in Danish
- UEFA in English

== Player statistics ==
No.	Player	Apps (as sub)	Goals	YC	RC
1	(Denmark) Jesper Christiansen	51	0	1	0
2	(Czech Republic) Zdeněk Pospěch	20 (2)	2	2	0
3	(Denmark) Niclas Jensen	32 (4)	0	3	0
4	(Denmark) Hjalte Nørregaard	39 (15)	3	5	1
5	(Norway) Brede Hangeland	32	3	3	0
5	(Denmark) Ulrik Laursen	16 (1)	0	3	0
6	(Denmark) Rasmus Würtz	34 (5)	1	9	0
7	(Brazil) Aílton José Almeida	18 (29)	11	4	1
8	(Denmark) Michael Silberbauer	39 (9)	2	4	0
9	(Sweden) Fredrik Berglund	0 (1)	0	0	0
9	(Denmark) Morten Nordstrand	35 (12)	14	2	0
10	(Denmark) Jesper Grønkjær	37 (5)	6	4	0
11	(Sweden) Marcus Allbäck	39 (7)	15	5	0
13	(Canada) Atiba Hutchinson	47 (7)	10	3	0
14	(Denmark) Michael Gravgaard	41 (1)	3	3	2
15	(Sweden) Mikael Antonsson	21 (6)	1	3	0
17	(Sweden) Oscar Wendt	37 (5)	0	0	0
18	(Brazil) José Júnior	10 (6)	8	0	0
21	(Denmark) Frederik Vang Larsen	0	0	0	0
22	(Denmark) Morten Bertolt	1 (5)	0	0	0
23	(Denmark) William Kvist	52 (4)	0	3	0
24	(Czech Republic) Libor Sionko	33 (13)	8	6	0
25	(Denmark) Mathias "Zanka" Jørgensen	14 (15)	4	0	0
26	(Denmark) Nikolaj Hansen	1 (7)	0	0	0
27	(Denmark) Jacob Neestrup	2 (7)	0	1	0
28	(Denmark) Mads Laudrup	2 (5)	0	0	0
29	(Denmark) Lasse Qvist	0 (6)	0	0	0
41	(Australia) Nathan Coe	8 (3)	0	0	0
--	(Denmark) Jacob Albrechtsen	0 (1)	0	0	0
--	(Denmark) Thomas Christensen	0 (1)	0	0	0
--	(France) Garra Dembélé	0 (1)	0	0	0
--	(Denmark) Danni Jensen	1 (1)	0	0	0
--	(South Africa) Bongomusa Mthethwa	0 (2)	0	0	0
--	(Denmark) Kim Tandrup	0 (1)	0	0	0
--	(Denmark) Şaban Özdoğan	2	0	0	0

== Honours ==
- Profile of the Year in the Superliga (2007): Jesper Grønkjær
- Superliga Player of the Year (2007): Jesper Grønkjær
- Manager of the Year (2007): Ståle Solbakken
- The Autumn Profile (2007): Jesper Grønkjær
- Danish Goalkeeper of the Year (2007): Jesper Christiansen
- Team of the Year (Denmark) (2007): Jesper Christiansen, Jesper Grønkjær, Morten Nordstrand
- Team of the Year (Norway) (2007): Brede Hangeland

== See also ==
- 2007–08 Danish Superliga
- 2007–08 Danish Cup
- 2007–08 UEFA Champions League
- 2007–08 UEFA Cup
