= 2009 Danish Cup final =

- Event: 2008–09 Danish Cup
AaB	Copenhagen
0	1
- Date: 21 May 2009
- Venue: Parken, Copenhagen
- Man of the Match: Thomas Augustinussen (AaB)
- Referee: Peter Rasmussen
- Attendance: 29,249

The 2009 Danish Cup final was the final and deciding match of the 2008–09 Danish Cup. It took place on Thursday 21 May 2009 at Parken Stadium in Copenhagen. The then-leader in the Superliga F.C. Copenhagen met AaB, who was in 7th.

F.C. Copenhagen won the match 1–0 on a 31st-minute goal by midfielder William Kvist, securing the club their fourth cup title after they won in 1995, 1997 and 2004.

The two clubs also met in the 2004 final, that also ended in a 1–0-win for Byens Hold.

The Pokal-fighter-award was handed to AaB's captain Thomas Augustinussen.

Peter Rasmussen refereed the match in front of a crowd of 29,249 in a Parken being rebuilt.

== Road to Copenhagen ==
AaB		Round	F.C. Copenhagen	
Brønshøj BK [2D] A 3-2	Augustinussen 18; Saganowski 85; Risgård 99	Third round	FC Vestsjælland [2D] A 4-0	Kvist 56; Júnior 67 (pen.); Aílton 84, 88
FC Fredericia [1D] A 1-0	Due 8	Fourth round	Næstved BK [1D] A 3-0	Aílton 19, 76; Júnior 87
FC Nordsjælland [SL] A 2-1	Jakobsen 45 (pen.); Cacá 84	Quarter finals	Lyngby BK [1D] A 4-2p	
Brøndby IF [SL] A 3-3	Risgård 22; Shelton 63; Johansson 77	Semi finals First leg	Nordvest FC [DS] A 4-0	Jensen 33; Nørregaard 53; N'Doye 82, 90
Brøndby IF [SL] H 1-1	Cacá 60	Second leg	Nordvest FC [DS] H 2-1	N'Doye 18; Nordstrand 56

- Both teams started in third round.
- Square brackets [ ] represent the opposition's division.

== Match details ==
21 May 2009
15:00 CEST

AaB	0–1	F.C. Copenhagen
	Report	Kvist 31'

Parken Stadium, Copenhagen
Attendance: 29,249
Referee: Peter Rasmussen

AaB	F.C. Copenhagen

AAB
GK	1	(Morocco) Karim Zaza
RB	6	(Netherlands) Steve Olfers		(substituted off) 56'
CB	31	(Denmark) Lasse Nielsen
CB	5	(Norway) Kjetil Wæhler
LB	27	(Denmark) Patrick Kristensen	(yellow card) 28'
RM	18	(Brazil) Caca
CM	21	(Denmark) Kasper Risgård	(yellow card) 81'
CM	9	(Denmark) Thomas Augustinussen	(yellow card) 90+1'
CM	8	(Sweden) Andreas Johansson	(yellow card) 75'	(substituted off) 76'
LM	23	(Denmark) Thomas Enevoldsen
FW	11	(Jamaica) Luton Shelton		(substituted off) 65'
Substitutes:
GK	30	(Denmark) Kenneth Stenild
MF	7	(Denmark) Anders Due		(substituted on) 56'
MF	15	(South Africa) Siyabonga Nomvethe		(substituted on) 65'
FW	14	(Denmark) Jeppe Curth		(substituted on) 76'
Manager:
(Sweden) Magnus Pehrsson

F.C. COPENHAGEN
GK	1	(Denmark) Jesper Christiansen
RB	2	(Czech Republic) Zdeněk Pospěch
CB	15	(Sweden) Michael Antonsson
CB	25	(Denmark) Mathias "Zanka" Jørgensen
LB	17	(Sweden) Oscar Wendt
RM	8	(Denmark) William Kvist
CM	16	(Denmark) Thomas Kristensen
CM	4	(Denmark) Hjalte Nørregaard
LM	13	(Canada) Atiba Hutchinson
FW	14	(Senegal) Dame N'Doye	(substituted off) 55'
FW	7	(Brazil) Aílton Almeida	(substituted off) 72'
Substitutes:
GK	21	(Sweden) Johan Wiland
MF	20	(Denmark) Martin Vingaard
FW	9	(Denmark) Morten Nordstrand	(substituted on) 55'
FW	11	(Brazil) César Santin	(substituted on) 72'
Manager:
(Norway) Ståle Solbakken

== See also ==
- 2008–09 Danish Cup for details of the current competition.
