= Nikolaj Hansen (footballer, born 1987) =

Danish footballer

Personal information
- Full name: Nikolaj Steen Hansen
- Date of birth: 7 April 1987 (age 39)
- Place of birth: Copenhagen, Denmark
- Position: Centre-back

Youth career
- –2006: KB

Senior career*
Years	Team	Apps	(Gls)
2006–2008	Copenhagen	2	(0)
2009	BK Frem	12	(0)
2009–2016	FC Roskilde		
2016–2019	Næstved	69	(2)
2019–2022	Helsingør	71	(4)

International career
2003–2004	Denmark U-17	4	(0)
2004–2005	Denmark U-18	2	(0)
2005–2006	Denmark U-19	8	(1)
2006–2007	Denmark U-20	4	(1)
- * Club domestic league appearances and goals as of 17:34, 26 June 2022 (UTC)

Nikolaj Steen Hansen (born 7 April 1987) is a Danish footballer, who plays as a centre-back.

== Career ==
Before moving to Frem, Hansen had always played for FCK. His first team début came on 20 September 2006 in a cup match against Thisted FC. He replaced the injured Jacob Neestrup in the 61st minute in the match, which FCK won on penalties.

His league debut came on 22 October 2006, where he replaced Michael Gravgaard in the 61st minute of the 3–0 win against Viborg FF. He left F.C. Copenhagen at the end of 2008 and joined Frem on 2 February 2009.

== Honours ==
- Danish Superliga: 2006–07
