= Morten Nordstrand =

Danish footballer (born 1983)

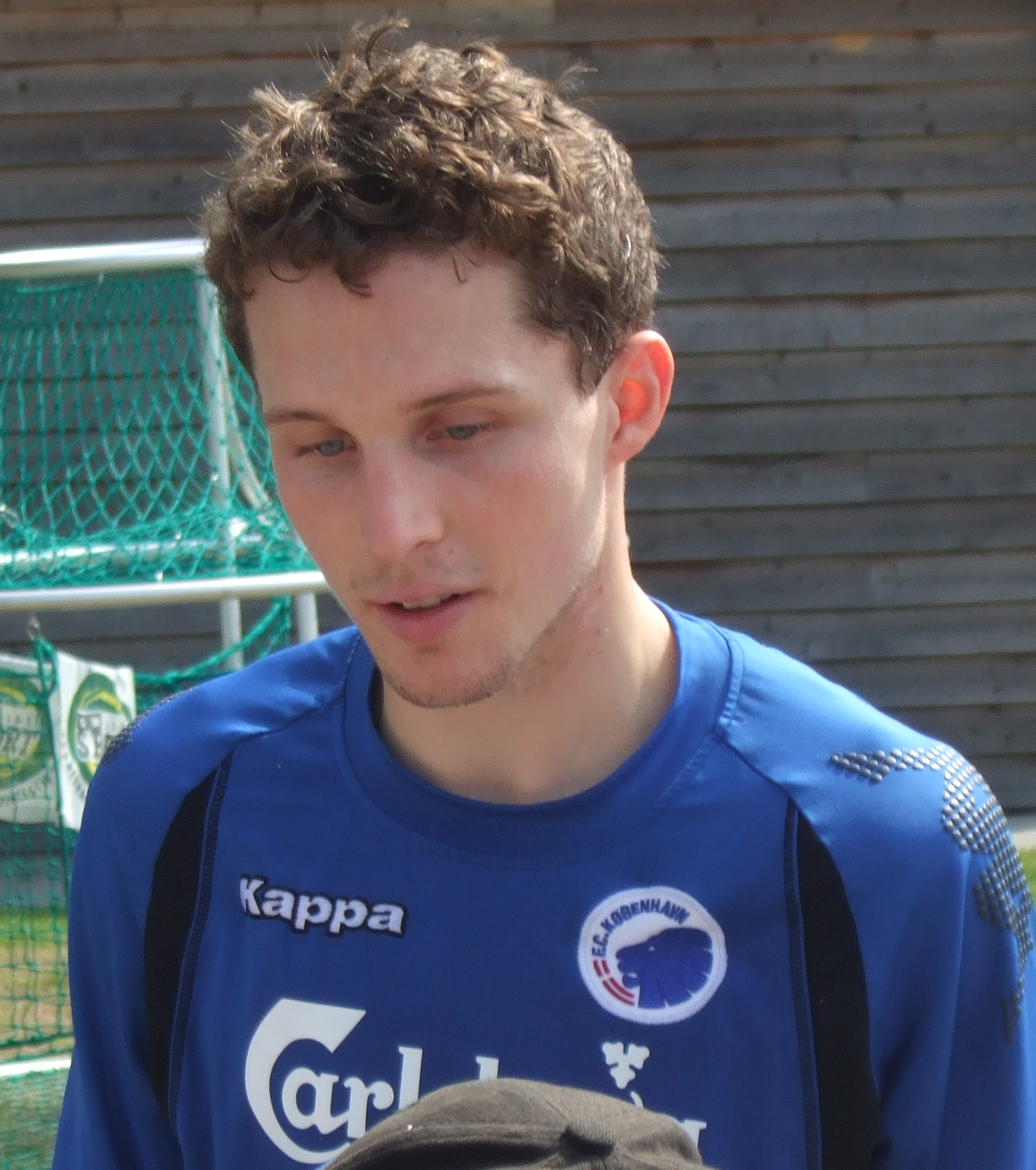
- Nordstrand with F.C. Copenhagen in 2008

Personal information
- Full name: Morten Nordstrand Nielsen
- Date of birth: 8 June 1983 (age 43)
- Place of birth: Hundested, Denmark
- Height: 1.77 m (5 ft 10 in)
- Position: Striker

Team information
- Current team: FC Copenhagen (youth coach)

Youth career
- Hundested IK
- Frederikshavn
- Lyngby

Senior career*
Years	Team	Apps	(Gls)
2001–2006	Lyngby	93	(87)
2006–2007	Nordsjælland	33	(18)
2007–2012	F.C. Copenhagen	86	(32)
2009–2010	→ Groningen (loan)	12	(2)
2011	→ Nordsjælland (loan)	9	(5)
2012–2015	Nordsjælland	56	(10)
2015–2016	AGF	24	(3)
2016–2017	Newcastle Jets	34	(7)
2017–2018	Fremad Amager	29	(5)
Total		376	(169)

International career
2007–2009	Denmark	8	(3)

Managerial career
- 2018–2020: FC Copenhagen (U17 assistant)
- * Club domestic league appearances and goals

Morten Nordstrand Nielsen (Danish pronunciation: [ˈnoɐ̯stʁɑnˀ]; born 8 June 1983) is a Danish former professional footballer, who played as a striker. He is currently the assistant coach of F.C. Copenhagen U17. He has played eight times for the Denmark national football team.

== Club career ==
=== Youth football ===
Born in Hundested, Nordstrand played for the local club from he was 5 to 17 years old. He was known for scoring a lot of goals, and his father thought he should move to Frederikshavn and stay at Nordjyllands Sportscollege and play for the local club Frederikshavn fI. After the college stay he moved back to Hundested.

=== Lyngby BK ===
Nordstrand's coach from college contacted Lyngby BK about Nordstrand and his talent, and afterwards he started as senior player in Lyngby. When the club went bankrupt in the winter 2001, Nordstrand moved up from the youth team as one of several amateur players comprising Lyngby BK's first team squad. He made his senior debut in December 2001, 17 years old. He played three league games, as Lyngby finished last in the 2001–02 Superliga season, and underwent forced relegation to the fourth level of Danish football, the Denmark Series.

Nordstrand stayed at the club, and proved himself a goalscorer in the lower leagues of Danish football. Lyngby won promotion to the Danish 2nd Division at the end of the 2003–04 season. Nordstrand formed a dangerous striker partnership with Christian Holst, the pair scoring 43 goals in the 2004–05 season. Nordstrand was the club topscorer with 22 goals, as Lyngby finished third in the 2nd Division that year, and won promotion to the Danish 1st Division.

=== Nordsjælland ===
When Superliga club FC Nordsjælland sold top-scoring striker, and later Danish international, Mads Junker in January 2006, it was initially speculated that Nordstrand would fill his place in the squad. Nordstrand finished the season with Lyngby, and topped the 1st Division goalscorer list with 29 goals, when Lyngby barely missed promotion during the 2005–06 season. Nordstrand decided he wanted top-flight football, and was chased by a number of Superliga clubs, as well as Dutch club FC Groningen. With his Lyngby contract running out in July 2006, he eventually signed a contract with FC Nordsjælland.

In his first season back in the top-flight Danish Superliga, he was the top goalscorer after the first half of the 2006–07 Superliga, with 10 goals in 18 games. Nordstrand was called up for the league national team, which played a number of unofficial national team games in the United States, El Salvador and Honduras in January 2007, by national team manager Morten Olsen. He played in all three games and scored one goal on the tour. On the date of arrival in Copenhagen from the tour, he was selected to the Danish national team for a friendly match against Australia in February 2007. He made his national team debut, when he came on as a substitute in the 86th minute of the match. He has played all matches of this season (33) scoring 18 or 19 goals. Some media says that he has scored 18 goals others say 19, a goal against FCM was scored by either Nordstrand or Lundberg. Which is still discussed.

=== F.C. Copenhagen ===
On 6 July 2007, Nordstrand moved to F.C. Copenhagen, signing a five-year-long contract with the Danish champions. The transfer fee was reported to be around 15 million Danish kroner (€2 million ), at that time the largest transfer fee ever paid for a player between two Danish clubs.

At F.C. Copenhagen Nordstrand quickly became an important player. In the 2007–08 season he scored 9 goals and alongside Marcus Allbäck was the team's main attacking force. In the beginning of 2008–09 season he usually started the matches, but he often found himself on the bench with Ailton Almeida and Cesar Santin playing in attack. Despite that, he scored 20 goals in competitive matches for F.C. Copenhagen in the 2008–09 season and was the team's top scorer.

He is also known as Denmark's version of Ole Gunnar Solskjær because of an old nickname "Babyface Assassin".

==== Loan to FC Groningen ====
In August 2009 Nordstrand signed for Dutch Eredivisie club FC Groningen on loan, as a replacement for fan favourite and fellow Scandinavian Marcus Berg. In his debut game with his new club, he provided the only goal in a derby against SC Heerenveen, ended in a 1–0 win for FC Groningen, the first in the Eredivisie season for the Green-Whites. On 23 March 2010, Groningen announced they would not consider the purchase option and that Nordstrand would return to F.C. Copenhagen.

=== Return to Nordsjælland ===
On 17 January 2012, Nordstrand signed a contract with FC Nordsjælland effective 1 July same year.

=== AGF ===
On 14 December 2014 Nordstrand signed 1-year contract with AGF. He left the club on 1 January 2016.

=== Newcastle Jets ===
On 28 January 2016, Nordstrand joined Australian club Newcastle Jets.

Following a positive performance including 4 goals in 11 appearances, Nordstrand signed a year extension of his contract. Then, he went on a goal drought for 13 rounds after scoring the winning goal against Brisbane Roar. Newcastle Jets did not score a goal since round 22 after his teammate Andrew Nabbout went on a goal drought as well. After he had left the club, in the first round of the next season, his replacement Roy O'Donovan scored a hat-trick against his former team.

=== Fremad Amager ===
On 3 June 2017, Nordstrand signed with Danish 1st Division-side Fremad Amager.

== Coaching career ==
After retiring in the summer 2018, he was appointed assistant coach for the U17 team of FC Copenhagen. Two years later, in the summer 2020, he was moved to a new role as a forward coach for the U13 to the U17 teams.

== International goals ==
Scores and results list Denmark's goal tally first, score column indicates score after each Nordstrand goal.

List of international goals scored by Morten Nordstrand
No.	Date	Venue	Opponent	Score	Result	Competition
1	12 September 2007	Aarhus, Denmark	Liechtenstein	1–0	4–0	Euro 2008 qualification
2	12 September 2007	Aarhus, Denmark	Liechtenstein	4–0	4–0	Euro 2008 qualification
3	28 March 2009	Attard, Malta	Malta	3–0	3–0	World Cup 2010 qualification

== Honours ==
FC Copenhagen

- Danish Superliga: 2008–09
- Danish Cup: 2008–09, 2011–12
- Danish Superliga topscorer : 2008–09

FC Nordsjælland

- Danish Cup: 2010–11
