= Danni Jensen =

Danish footballer (born 1989)

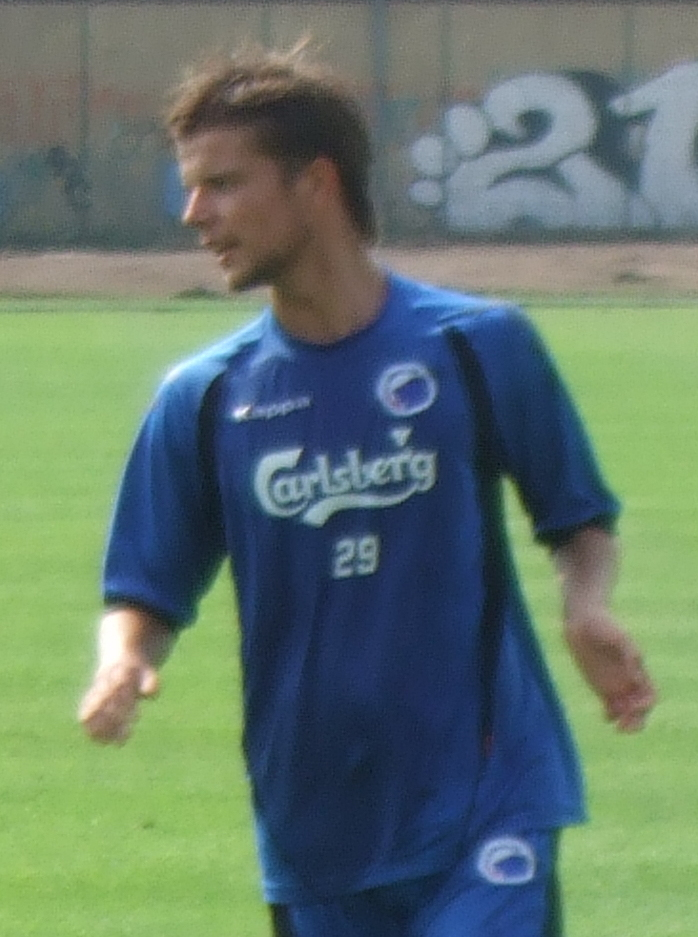
- Jensen in 2008

Personal information
- Date of birth: 10 June 1989 (age 37)
- Place of birth: Taastrup, Denmark
- Height: 1.77 m (5 ft 10 in)
- Position: Right-back

Team information
- Current team: BK Frem
- Number: 28

Youth career
- 1994–2003: Taastrup B70
- 2003–2008: KB

Senior career*
Years	Team	Apps	(Gls)
2008–2011	FC Copenhagen	1	(0)
2011–2012	AB		
2012–2013	BK Avarta		
2013–	BK Frem		

International career^{‡}
2005–2006	Denmark U17	12	(0)
2007	Denmark U18	1	(0)
2008	Denmark U19	1	(0)
- * Club domestic league appearances and goals as of 12 April 2013 ‡ National team caps and goals as of 12 April 2013

Danni Jensen (born 10 June 1989) is a Danish footballer who plays as a right-back for Boldklubben Frem. He has previously played for Danish Superliga club F.C. Copenhagen.

He was promoted to the first team at training start in the summer 2008, together with Jacob Albrechtsen. Although, both of them joined the first team at a training camp at La Manga Club in January 2008.

Jensen's first team debut came on 31 July 2008 in a UEFA Cup qualifier against Cliftonville from Northern Ireland. He played the whole second half on the right back after having substituted Zdeněk Pospěch in the half time.

== Honours ==
- Danish Superliga: 2008–09, 2009–10, 2010-11
- Danish Cup: 2008–09
- Danish U-16 League Champion: 2005
