= Jacob Albrechtsen =

Danish footballer (born 1990)

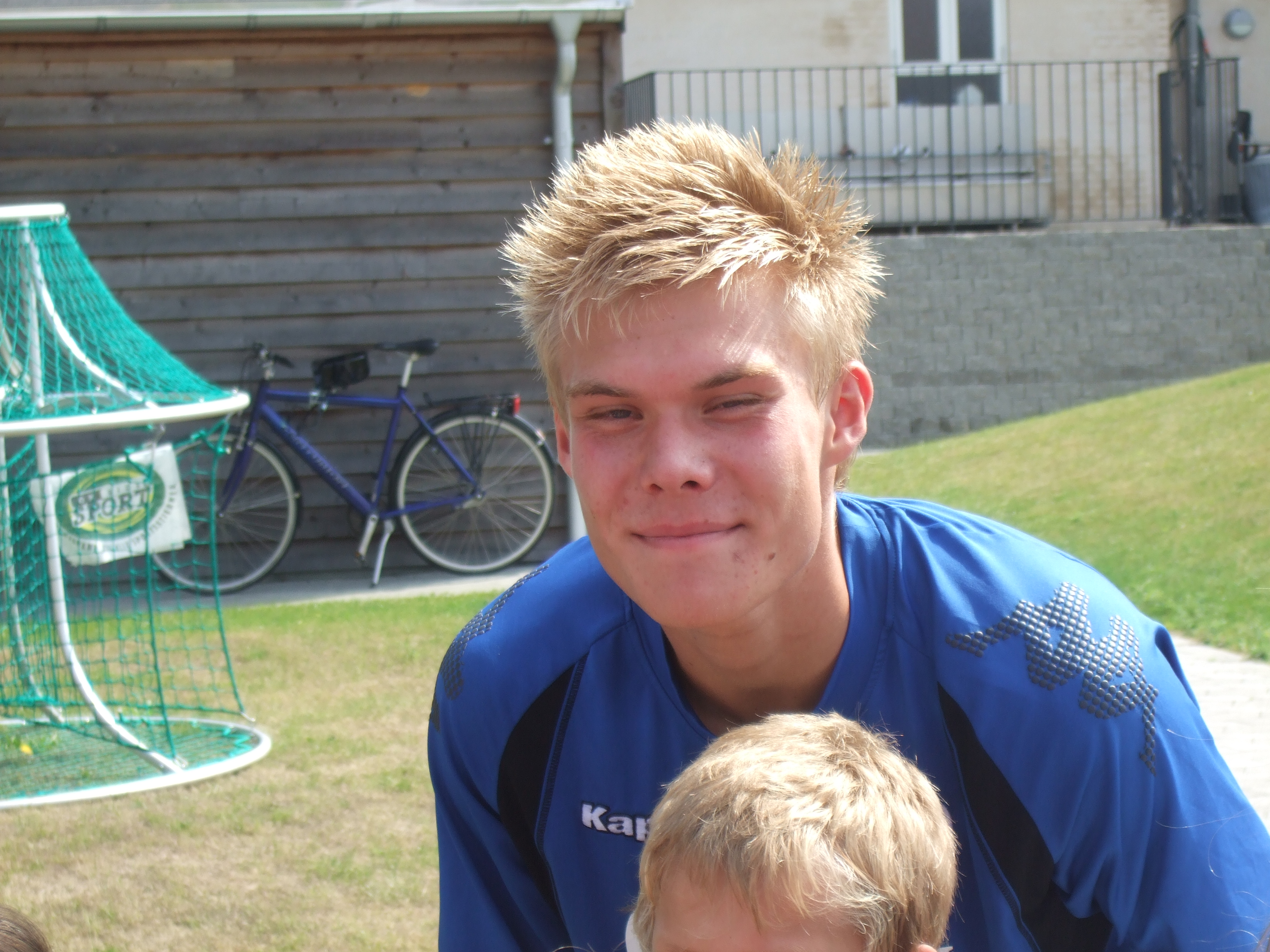

Personal information
- Date of birth: 10 March 1990 (age 36)
- Place of birth: Smørum, Denmark
- Height: 1.90 m (6 ft 3 in)
- Position: Centre back

Youth career
- 1995–2003: Ledøje-Smørum Fodbold
- 2003–2008: KB

Senior career*
Years	Team	Apps	(Gls)
2008–2010	F.C. Copenhagen	0	(0)
2010–2014	SC Egedal		
2014–2019	BK Avarta		

International career
2006	Denmark U-16	2	(0)
2006–2007	Denmark U-17	8	(0)
2007–2008	Denmark U-18	5	(0)
2008–2010	Denmark U-19	8	(0)
2009–2010	Denmark U-20	3	(0)
- * Club domestic league appearances and goals

Jacob Albrechtsen (born 10 March 1990) is a Danish retired football centre back.

He is the younger brother of Martin Albrechtsen.

== Career ==
He was promoted to the first team at training start in the summer 2008, together with Danni Jensen. Although, both of them joined the first team at a training camp at La Manga Club in January 2008.

Albrechtsen's first team debut came on 31 July 2008 in a UEFA Cup qualifier against Cliftonville from Northern Ireland. He played the last 19 minutes in the defense after having substituted Oscar Wendt.

Albrechtsen decided to retire at the end of the 2018–19 season.

== Honours ==
- Danish Superliga: 2008–09 & 2009–10
- Danish Cup: 2008–09
- Danish U-16 League Champion: 2005
