= Şaban Özdoğan =

Danish footballer (born 1990)

Personal information
- Date of birth: 14 March 1990 (age 36)
- Place of birth: Copenhagen, Denmark
- Height: 1.78 m (5 ft 10 in)
- Position: Winger

Team information
- Current team: Ishøj (assistant)

Youth career
- –1999: Avarta
- 1999–2009: KB

Senior career*
Years	Team	Apps	(Gls)
2009–2011	Copenhagen	6	(0)
2012	Avarta		
2012–2015	Svebølle B&I		
2015–2016	Holbæk B&I		
2016–2019	Avarta	77	(1)
2019–2024	Ishøj	95	(?)

International career
2006	Denmark U16	2	(1)
2006–2007	Denmark U17	3	(0)
2007–2008	Denmark U18	5	(0)
2008–2009	Denmark U19	11	(0)
2009–2011	Denmark U20	5	(0)

Managerial career
- 2019–2024: Ishøj (assistant)
- 2025–2026: Holbæk (assistant)
- 2026–: Holbæk
- * Club domestic league appearances and goals as of 17:00, 27 July 2019 (UTC)

Şaban Özdoğan (born 14 March 1990) is a Danish retired footballer and current manager of Holbæk B&I. He previously played for Danish Superliga club F.C. Copenhagen.

== Club career ==
Özdoğan started playing youth football at Avarta. He moved to Kjøbenhavns Boldklub (KB) in 1999, the reserve team of multiple Danish champions FC Copenhagen. Özdoğan made his debut for Copenhagen, the defending 2005–06 Danish Superliga champions, in the unofficial 2006 Viasat Cup tournament in May 2006, after playing the first half of the 2006–07 season for KB's youth team. On 3 December 2006, he made his official debut for the club in 1–0 home loss to Norwegian club Lillestrøm in the Royal League, replacing Lars Jacobsen in the 69th minute. In 2007, he was promoted to the KB senior squad, two years early, alongside Mads Laudrup.

Ahead of the 2009–10 season, Özdoğan was promoted to the Copenhagen first team squad together with Thomas Delaney, under manager Ståle Solbakken. Özdoğan made his Superliga debut in April 2010, and played two games as Copenhagen won the 2009–10 Danish Superliga championship. In the following season, he played in four games, as FCK won the championship once again. Özdoğan played a total of 70 minutes in these six games for FCK. Özdoğan had his contract terminated in December 2011, as he was deemed surplus to requirements by Copenhagen's new manager Roland Nilsson.

After undergoing a trial with Turkish second division club Kasımpaşa, Özdoğan chose not to sign with the club, suspecting that the contract offered was dubious. Following an unsuccessful trial with Danish 1st Division club Viborg, Özdoğan returned to his childhood club, Avarta, in the Danish 2nd Division during the spring season of 2012. In August of the same year, he joined rival club Svebølle B&I, also in the 2nd Division.

In the summer of 2019, Avarta announced that Özdoğan had departed the club and would take on the role of a playing assistant manager at Ishøj IF. On June 14, 2024, Ishøj IF confirmed that Özdoğan retired after the last game of the season, which ended in a victory and meant that Ishøj moved up to the 2024-25 Danish 2nd Division.

In 2025, he became assistant manager to Erdogan Aslan at Holbæk B&I, and when Aslan was promoted to director of sports in the summer of 2026, Özdoğan was promoted to new manager of the club.

== International career ==
He has played 26 games and scored a single goal for various Danish youth national teams. He made his debut for the Danish under-16 national team in January 2006, and played two matches for the team and scored a goal. In September 2006, he was called up for the Danish under-17 national team.

== Honours ==
Copenhagen

- Danish Superliga: 2009–10, 2010–11
