= Jacob Neestrup =

Danish football manager (born 1988)

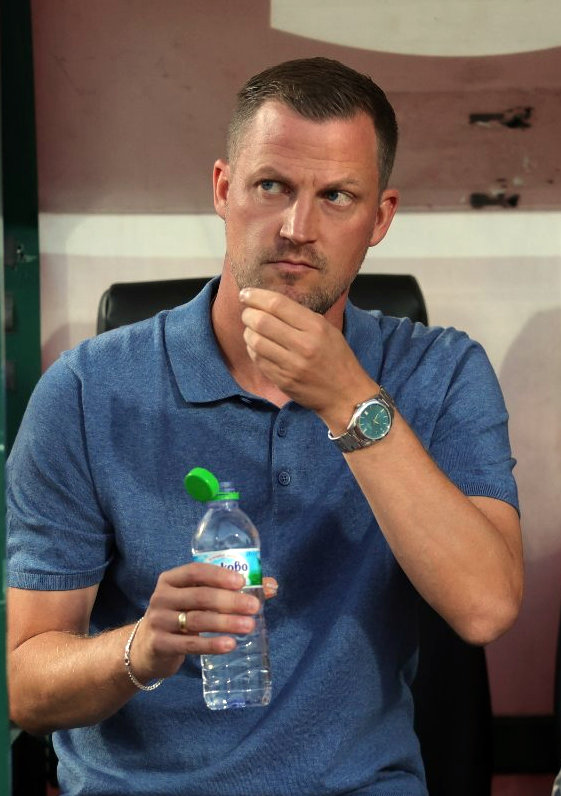
- Neestrup with Panathinaikos in 2026

Personal information
- Full name: Jacob Neestrup Hansen
- Date of birth: 8 March 1988 (age 38)
- Place of birth: Copenhagen, Denmark
- Height: 1.84 m (6 ft 0 in)
- Position: Midfielder

Team information
- Current team: Panathinaikos (head coach)

Youth career
- 1994–1998: Fremad Amager
- 1998–2007: KB

Senior career*
Years	Team	Apps	(Gls)
2007–2009	Copenhagen	2	(0)
2009–2010	Stavanger	0	(0)
2010–2011	Hafnarfjörður	6	(0)
2011	Fremad Amager		

International career
2007	Denmark U20	2	(0)

Managerial career
- 2013–2018: Copenhagen U17
- 2019–2020: Viborg
- 2022–2026: Copenhagen
- 2026–: Panathinaikos
- * Club domestic league appearances and goals

Jacob Neestrup Hansen (born 8 March 1988) is a Danish professional football manager and former player. He is currently the head coach of Super League Greece club Panathinaikos.

A former midfielder, Neestrup emerged from the Copenhagen youth academy, but saw his career mostly diminished due to injuries. After retiring in 2011, he embarked on a career in management. He was appointed as head coach of 1st Division club Viborg in June 2019, after having worked as an assistant at Copenhagen the season before. From October 2022 until March 2026, he was the head coach at Copenhagen. During his tenure, he led the team to two Danish Superliga titles and two Danish Cups.

== Playing career ==
Although his first team debut came on 20 September 2006 in the Danish Cup, Neestrup was not promoted to the first team before the summer of 2007. He was injured only two minutes into his professional debut. The injury subsequently ruled him out for eight months.

After recovering, Neestrup made his Danish Superliga debut in the last match of the 2006–07 season against Vejle.

In May 2010, Neestrup was signed by reigning Icelandic champions Hafnarfjörður. His stint with the club was not successful, being sidelined for large parts of the season due to injuries and a car accident. After six months, he returned to Denmark to sign with fourth-tier Denmark Series club Fremad Amager.

== Managerial career ==
=== Viborg ===
On 20 June 2019, it was confirmed that Neestrup had been appointed as the manager of Viborg for the upcoming season. In his first season at the club, he guided the team to a third place in the 2019-20 Danish 1st Division.

On 22 December 2020, it was announced that Neestrup would leave Viborg at the end of the year and return to Copenhagen as assistant manager to Jess Thorup. He left Viborg in first place in the 2020–21 Danish 1st Division. He was replaced by Lars Friis, who would go on to win the Danish 1st Division and secure promotion to the Danish Superliga.

=== Copenhagen ===
On 20 September 2022, Neestrup was announced as the new manager of Copenhagen following the sacking of Jess Thorup. Despite being placed ninth out of 12, and being ten points off first place when he took over, Neestrup still eventually guided the club to win the Danish Superliga and the Danish Cup. On 12 December 2023, he guided them to the knockout stages of the Champions League, being placed second in a group with Bayern Munich, Galatasaray and Manchester United.

In the 2024–25 season, Neestrup and Copenhagen won double again, beating Midtjylland by just a single point in the league and beating Silkeborg in the cup final.

In the 2025–26 season, Copenhagen missed the championship group for the first time in the modern Superliga format. After losing the two opening matches in the relegation group to OB and Fredericia, Neestrup was fired and replaced by Bo Svensson. At the time Copenhagen were without a win in 8 matches, which was the most of any team in Superliga.

In the Champions League Copenhagen reached the league phase, where they would go out in 31st. They got two wins against Kairat Almaty and Villarreal.

=== Panathinaikos ===
On 26 May 2026, Neestrup was announced as new manager of Super League Greece side Panathinaikos in a two-year agreement, following the sacking of Rafa Benitez.

Despite initial difficulties during the 2026-27 UEFA Conference League summer qualifying, Panathinaikos under Neestrup showed great potential for the first time in years. On 20 September 2026 Neestrup equalized and surpassed the 13 consecutive unbeaten matches record that was held by the late Giannis Kyrastas since the 2001–02 season, scoring until that point 10 victories and 3 draws (Kyrastas had 9 victories and 4 draws which ended by a 2-1 defeat by Arsenal in Highbury Stadium for the 2001–02 UEFA Champions League season).

== Managerial statistics ==
As of matches played by 22 November 2026

Managerial record by team and tenure
Team	From	To	Record								Ref
Team	From	To	G	W	D	L	GF	GA	GD	Win %	Ref
Viborg	20 June 2019	31 December 2020	54	31	13	10	116	65	+51	57.41	
Copenhagen	20 September 2022	29 March 2026	189	103	39	47	359	225	+134	54.50	
Panathinaikos	26 May 2026	present	23	19	3	1	49	17	+32	82.61	
Total			266	153	55	58	524	307	+217	57.52	—

== Honours ==
=== Player ===
Hafnarfjarðar

- Iceland Cup: 2010
- Iceland Super Cup: 2010

Copenhagen

- Danish Superliga: 2006–07, 2008–09
- Danish Cup: 2008–09

=== Manager ===
Copenhagen

- Danish Superliga: 2022–23, 2024–25
- Danish Cup: 2022–23, 2024–25
