= Flemming Østergaard =

Danish businessman

- Born: Flemming Ammentorp Østergaard; 31 October 1943 (age 82); Det Gule Palæ, Ordrup, Denmark
- Other names: Don Ø
- Education: Stockbroker
- Occupation: Retired
- Spouse: Inge Østergaard
- Children: Peter & Nikolaj Østergaard
- Parent(s): Wedell Østergaard & Doris Ammentorp

Flemming Ammentorp Østergaard (born 31 October 1943 in Det Gule Palæ (Danish: The Yellow Palace), Ordrup) is a retired businessman, best known as long-time chairman of Parken Sport & Entertainment, who owns the football club F.C. Copenhagen. He is also known as Don Ø due to his sometimes Southern European paternal appearance, a nickname he received in the 1990s, by the editors of the fanwebsite "Fusionsnipserne".

In the eighties he suffered leg injuries from a traffic accident. Although his doctor told him, that he would never walk again, he refused to give up, and managed to work and train his leg, so that he not only walked again, but also was able to win a club championship in his tennis club.

Østergaard is primarily known from his leadership roles at Parken Sports & Entertainment A/S where he became Managing Director and later Chairman. During Østergaard's tenure at the company the financial return for shareholders was poor.

== Stock price manipulation and jail sentence ==
In March 2017 Flemming Østergaard received an 18 months jail sentence for deliberately manipulating the share price of Parken Sports & Entertainment A/S, events which took place during a period stretching 2007 and 2008. In addition to the jail sentence, DKK 9 million was confiscated from Østergaard personally and Parken Sports & Entertainment A/S received a fine of DKK 13 million as a result of the share price manipulation.

== Career ==
- 1968: Educated as a stockbroker.
- 1968: Sales manager in J.S. Lies Industries.
- 1971: Founds and runs own company, Føma Office Systems.
- 1975: Managing director in Tann Scandinavia.
- 1978: President of Tann Europe.
- 1988: Director in Kinnarps Office Furniture.
- 1994: Sells Kinnarps and take over Lyngby FC.
- 1996: Joins F.C. Copenhagen Ltd. (name later changed to Parken Sport & Entertainment A/S).
- 1997: Managing director in F.C. Copenhagen A/S.
- 2002: Stops as managing director in F.C. Copenhagen and takeover the post as chairman.
- 2007: Board member of TV 2 Denmark.
- 2010: Retired as chairman of Parken Sport & Entertainment.

== Book publications ==
- Don Ø, 2002
- Varmt hjerte, koldt blod (Warm heart, cold blood), 2005
- Manden bag myten (The man behind the myth), 2008
