= Oscar Wendt =

Swedish footballer

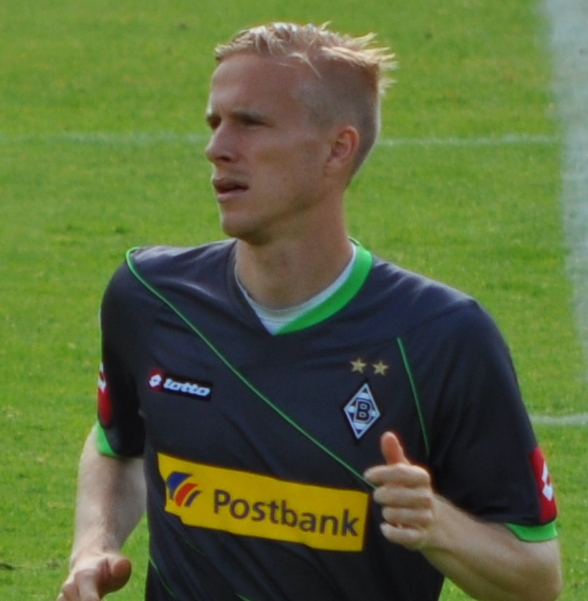
- Wendt playing for Borussia Mönchengladbach in 2011

Personal information
- Full name: Oscar Joakim Wendt
- Date of birth: 24 October 1985 (age 41)
- Place of birth: Skövde, Sweden
- Height: 1.81 m (5 ft 11 in)
- Position: Left-back

Team information
- Current team: IFK Göteborg (assistant coach)

Youth career
- –2002: IFK Skövde
- 2003: IFK Göteborg

Senior career*
Years	Team	Apps	(Gls)
2002	IFK Skövde		
2003–2006	IFK Göteborg	36	(1)
2006–2011	Copenhagen	138	(5)
2011–2021	Borussia Mönchengladbach	244	(16)
2021–2024	IFK Göteborg	86	(4)
Total		504	(26)

International career
2002	Sweden U17	2	(0)
2003	Sweden U19	7	(0)
2004–2006	Sweden U21	14	(1)
2007–2016	Sweden	28	(0)

Managerial career
- 2026–: IFK Göteborg (assistant)
- * Club domestic league appearances and goals

Oscar Joakim Wendt (born 24 October 1985) is a Swedish former professional footballer who played as a left-back. He is currently the assistant coach of Allsvenskan club IFK Göteborg.

A product of the IFK Skövde youth academy, he started his professional career with the club. Across his career, Wendt played for IFK Skövde, Copenhagen, Borussia Mönchengladbach, and IFK Göteborg. A full international from 2007 to 2016, he won 28 caps for Sweden.

== Club career ==
=== IFK Göteborg ===
After playing for IFK Skövde, he joined IFK Göteborg in 2003. He became an important first team player, earning 14 appearances on the Swedish U21 team and a call-up for the Sweden national team.

In his time at the club he played 91 matches, before moving to the Danish champions Copenhagen on a four-year contract for 6 million DKK. After his departure to Copenhagen, a huge gap arose in the defence, later filled by Argentine defender José Shaffer coming from Racing Club.

=== Copenhagen ===
In his first two years at Copenhagen, he struggled to become a first team regular, first being a back-up for former Norwegian international André Bergdølmo and later Danish international Niclas Jensen. However, in 2008, he managed to become a first choice on the left back position for his team, earning him after 18 months a call-up to the Sweden national team. His strong performances also had him linked with both English club West Ham United and Italian club Genoa.

With an injured Bergdølmo in Copenhagen's 2006–07 UEFA Champions League campaign, Wendt played regularly as a left back, and in the team's 3–1 win against Celtic, he alongside fellow Copenhagen defender Michael Gravgaard was chosen for the Eurosport "Team of the Round".

=== Borussia Mönchengladbach ===
Wendt joined Bundesliga club Borussia Mönchengladbach on a free transfer on 10 June 2011.

On 17 August 2015, Wendt signed a three-year contract extension with the club, running until the end of the 2017–18 season.

On 23 March 2021, Mönchengladbach announced that Wendt would be leaving the club when his contract expired at the end of the 2020–21 season. Over his time at the club, he made over 290 appearances for the club in ten years across all competitions.

=== Return to IFK Göteborg ===
On the same day, it was announced that Wendt would return to Sweden and rejoin IFK Göteborg on a free transfer. He returned on 1 July 2021, signing a one and-a-half year contract. Wendt was named club captain after Marcus Berg announced his retirement after the 2023 season.

=== Retirement ===
On 22 November 2024, Wendt announced his retirement from professional football, earning over 600 total appearances in 22 years.

== International career ==
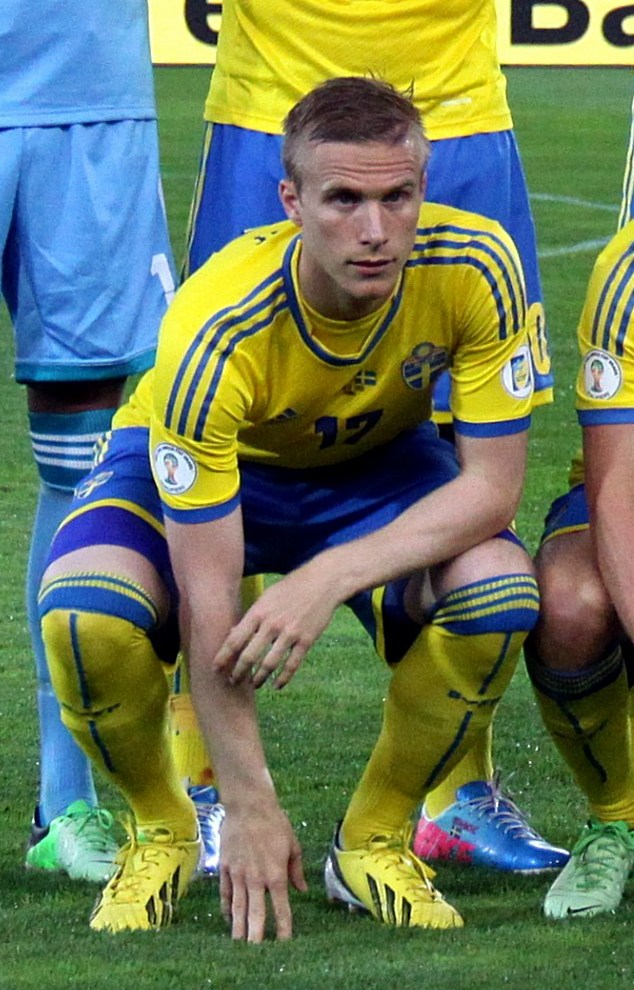
Wendt playing for Sweden in 2013

Having represented Sweden at U17, U19, and U21 levels, Wendt made his Sweden senior team debut in January 2007 in a friendly game against Venezuela. Wendt was overlooked for a spot in Sweden's UEFA Euro 2016 squad despite a strong season in Bundesliga.

Wendt retired from the national team in March 2017, having represented the national team a total of 28 times.

== Personal life ==
He is the son of former footballer Joakim Wendt, who played two seasons with IFK Göteborg.

== Career statistics ==
=== Club ===
As of 16 March 2021.

Appearances and goals by club, season and competition
Club	Season	League			Cup		Continental		Total	
Club	Season	Division	Apps	Goals	Apps	Goals	Apps	Goals	Apps	Goals
IFK Göteborg	2003	Allsvenskan	3	0	2	0	–		5	0
IFK Göteborg	2004	Allsvenskan	3	0	1	0	4	1	8	1
IFK Göteborg	2005	Allsvenskan	21	1	3	0	–		24	1
IFK Göteborg	2006	Allsvenskan	9	0	2	0	–		11	0
IFK Göteborg	Total		36	1	8	0	4	1	48	2
Copenhagen	2006–07	Danish Superliga	21	0	5	0	4	0	30	0
Copenhagen	2007–08	Danish Superliga	24	0	4	0	3	0	31	0
Copenhagen	2008–09	Danish Superliga	31	2	3	0	12	0	46	2
Copenhagen	2009–10	Danish Superliga	33	3	1	0	13	0	47	3
Copenhagen	2010–11	Danish Superliga	29	1	0	0	12	0	41	1
Copenhagen	Total		138	6	13	0	44	0	195	6
Borussia Mönchengladbach	2011–12	Bundesliga	14	0	2	1	–		16	1
Borussia Mönchengladbach	2012–13	Bundesliga	21	1	1	0	6	0	28	1
Borussia Mönchengladbach	2013–14	Bundesliga	18	3	0	0	–		18	3
Borussia Mönchengladbach	2014–15	Bundesliga	26	2	3	0	7	0	36	2
Borussia Mönchengladbach	2015–16	Bundesliga	30	3	3	0	6	0	38	3
Borussia Mönchengladbach	2016–17	Bundesliga	28	2	5	1	10	0	43	3
Borussia Mönchengladbach	2017–18	Bundesliga	28	1	3	0	–		31	1
Borussia Mönchengladbach	2018–19	Bundesliga	32	1	2	0	–		34	1
Borussia Mönchengladbach	2019–20	Bundesliga	25	2	2	0	4	0	31	2
Borussia Mönchengladbach	2020–21	Bundesliga	22	1	3	0	4	1	29	2
Borussia Mönchengladbach	Total		244	16	24	2	37	1	305	19
Career total			418	23	45	2	85	2	548	27

=== International ===
Appearances and goals by national team and year
National team	Year	Apps	Goals
Sweden	2007	3	0
Sweden	2008	2	0
Sweden	2009	2	0
Sweden	2010	5	0
Sweden	2011	6	0
Sweden	2012	0	0
Sweden	2013	3	0
Sweden	2014	2	0
Sweden	2015	2	0
Sweden	2016	3	0
Total		28	0

== Honours ==
Copenhagen

- Danish Superliga: 2006–07, 2008–09, 2009–10, 2010–11
- Danish Cup: 2008–09
