= Mads Laudrup =

Danish footballer (born 1989)

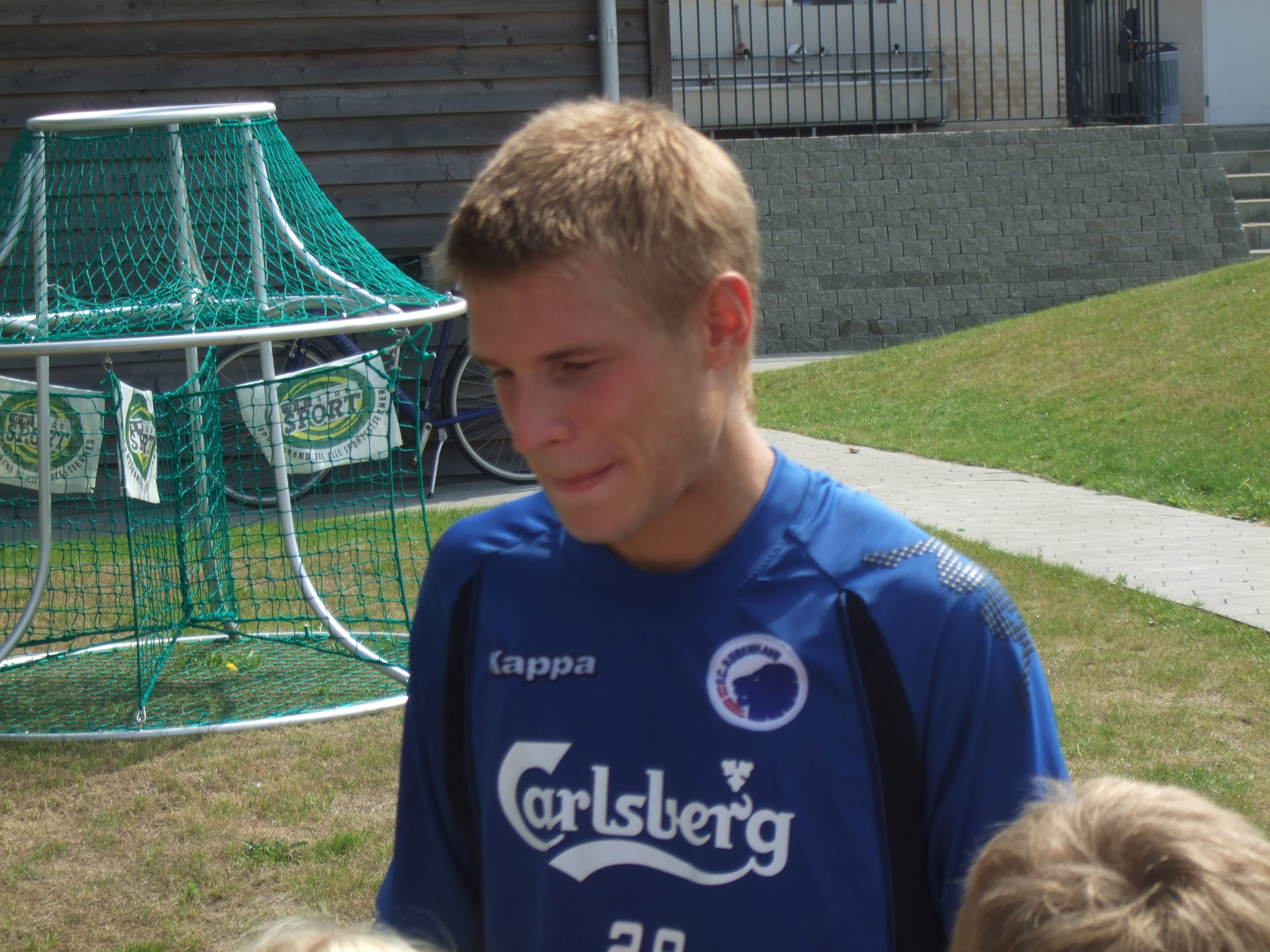
- Laudrup in 2008

Personal information
- Full name: Mads Thunø Laudrup
- Date of birth: 9 February 1989 (age 37)
- Place of birth: Milan, Italy
- Height: 1.73 m (5 ft 8 in)
- Position: Midfielder

Youth career
- 1995–: KB
- HIK
- –2006: KB

Senior career*
Years	Team	Apps	(Gls)
2006–2009	Copenhagen	2	(0)
2007	KB	5	(0)
2009	Herfølge BK	3	(0)
2009–2012	HB Køge	28	(2)
2012	→ Stjarnan (loan)	7	(0)
2012–2013	Hobro IK	10	(0)
2013–2015	FC Helsingør	49	(4)
Total		104	(6)

International career
2005	Denmark U16	3	(0)
2005–2006	Denmark U17	14	(1)
2006	Denmark U18	4	(0)
2007–2008	Denmark U19	8	(1)
- * Club domestic league appearances and goals

Mads Thunø Laudrup (born 9 February 1989) is a Danish former professional footballer who played as a midfielder. He has scored two goals and played 29 games for various Danish youth national teams.

== Career ==
Laudrup played for Kjøbenhavns Boldklub (KB), the reserve team of multiple Danish champions F.C. Copenhagen (FCK), while studying at "Falkonergårdens Gymnasium". He made his debut for the Danish under-16 national team in January 2005, and played three matches for the team, all as team captain. In August 2005, he was called up for the Danish under-17 national team, and scored a goal on penalty kick in his debut game; a 4–0 win over Iceland on 2 August 2005. He went on to play 14 matches for the under-17 national team, captaining the team in all 14 games.

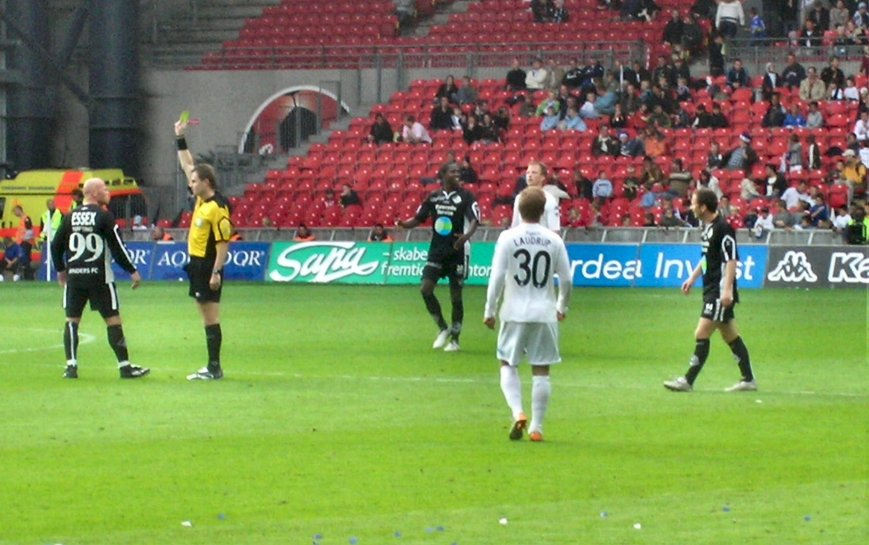
2007: Mads Laudrup playing for FC Copenhagen against Randers

He made his debut for F.C. Copenhagen, the defending 2006 Danish Superliga champions, in the unofficial 2006 Viasat Cup tournament in May 2006. After playing the first half of the 2006–07 season in the KB youth team, Laudrup was a part of the FCK squad for the Scandinavian Royal League 2006-07 tournament. He made his official FCK debut in the Royal League, playing two games against Lillestrøm SK in November and December 2006. At new year 2007 he was promoted to the KB senior squad, one year early, alongside Şaban Özdoğan.

On 30 March 2007 he was selected to FCK's squad against AC Horsens, for the next day's match. With 3 minutes left, he replaced Jesper Grønkjær in this match, which was his league debut. In the summer 2007 he was full-time promoted to the first team and also signed a new contract with F.C. Copenhagen. The deal kept him in the club until the 30 June 2009. He left on 14 January 2009 Kjøbenhavns Boldklub to join Herfølge Boldklub who signed a contract until 30 June 2011.

After his time at Herfølge Boldklub, his career would bring him to three more clubs: Stjarnan, Hobro IK and FC Helsingør. It was at FC Helsingør, that he would eventually decide to immediately retire from professional football, at the age of 26, in December 2015.

== Personal life ==
Mads is the son of former Danish international football player Michael Laudrup, who was awarded Denmark's Best Player Ever by the Danish Football Association in 2006. Mads Laudrup's uncle is former Danish international Brian Laudrup and his grandfather is former Danish international Finn Laudrup. His younger half brother Andreas Laudrup was a professional football player as well. His cousin Nicolai Laudrup son of Brian Laudrup also used to play football, but only in the Danish lower leagues, before joining FC Græsrødderne in 2016.
