= Martin Vingaard =

Danish footballer (born 1985)

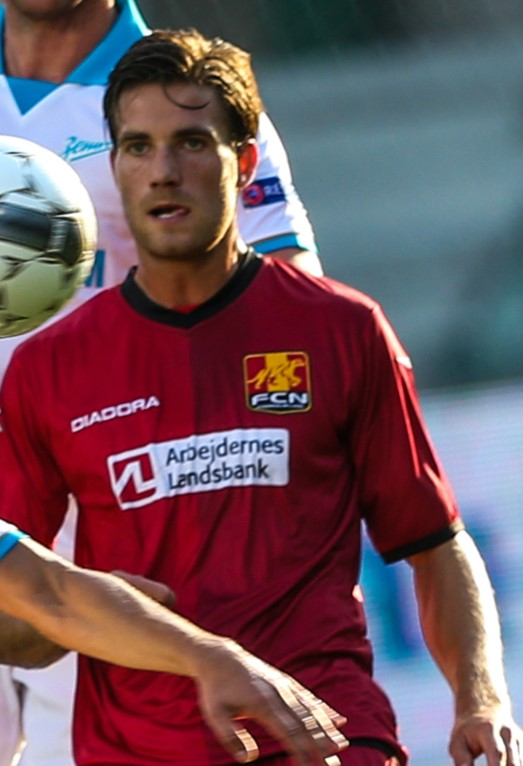
- Vingaard in 2013

Personal information
- Full name: Martin Vingaard Hansen
- Date of birth: 20 March 1985 (age 41)
- Place of birth: Odense, Denmark
- Height: 1.80 m (5 ft 11 in)
- Position: Midfielder

Team information
- Current team: Hillerød (assistant)

Youth career
- Skt. Klemens
- Dalum IF

Senior career*
Years	Team	Apps	(Gls)
2003–2005	B.1913		
2005–2008	Esbjerg fB	79	(16)
2009–2013	Copenhagen	97	(16)
2013–2016	Nordsjælland	91	(4)
2016–2018	Tampa Bay Rowdies	51	(1)
2019–2020	HB Køge	33	(1)

International career
2003–2004	Denmark U19	10	(2)
2004–2005	Denmark U20	6	(0)
2008–2011	Denmark	9	(1)

Managerial career
- 2020–2021: Copenhagen (U17 assistant)
- 2021–2022: Copenhagen (U15 manager)
- 2022–2023: Copenhagen (U17 manager)
- 2024–2025: Copenhagen (U19 staff)
- 2025–: Hillerød (assistant)
- * Club domestic league appearances and goals

Martin Vingaard (born 20 March 1985) is a Danish former professional footballer who played as a midfielder and current assistant manager of Hillerød Fodbold.

== Club career ==
Vingaard was born in Odense, Denmark, and grew up in the suburb of Fangel. After a strong season with his club FC Copenhagen, Vingaard was one of the nominees for Danish Football Player of the Year 2010, an award eventually won by teammate and captain William Kvist.

On 22 April 2019, Vingaard signed for the rest of the season with HB Køge. His retirement from football was announced on 16 July 2020.

== International career ==
He scored his first goal for the Denmark national football team in the friendly match against Poland on 1 June 2008.

== Coaching career ==
At the end of July 2020, he was appointed under-17s assistant coach of his former club, FC Copenhagen. On 21 December 2021 Copenhagen confirmed, that Vingaard had taken charge of the clubs under-15 team. He took over as head coach of the under-17s in September 2022. In January 2024, Vingaard was given a new role at the club when he took up the position of Player Development Coach at the club's U-19 team.

On April 1, 2025, Vingaard was hired as assistant coach at the Danish 1st Division club Hillerød Fodbold under manager Christian Lønstrup.

== Honours ==
Copenhagen

- Danish Superliga: 2008–09, 2009–10, 2010–11, 2012–13
- Danish Cup: 2008–09, 2011–12

Individual

- Tipsbladet Player of the Spring: 2008
