= Aílton (footballer, born August 1984) =

Brazilian footballer

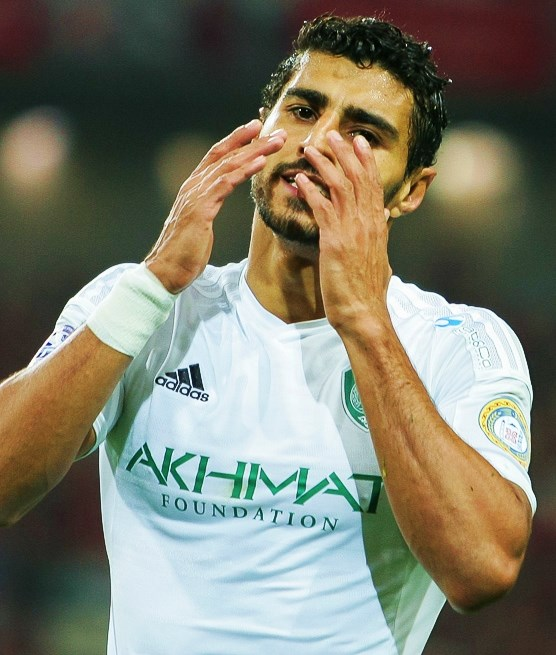
- Aílton playing for Terek Grozny in 2014

Personal information
- Full name: Aílton José Almeida
- Date of birth: 20 August 1984 (age 42)
- Place of birth: Hematita, Itabira, Brazil
- Height: 1.80 m (5 ft 11 in)
- Position: Striker

Senior career*
| Years | Team | Apps | (Gls) |
| 2000–2004 | Atlético Mineiro | 0 | (0) |
| 2004–2006 | Örgryte | 63 | (26) |
| 2006–2010 | Copenhagen | 93 | (21) |
| 2010–2012 | APOEL | 52 | (11) |
| 2012–2015 | Terek Grozny | 81 | (20) |
| 2015–2016 | Al-Hilal | 22 | (6) |
| 2016–2017 | Al Jazira | 19 | (6) |
| 2017–2018 | Al Dhafra | 14 | (7) |
| 2019–2021 | Örgryte IS | 76 | (17) |
| Total | | 420 | (114) |
- * Club domestic league appearances and goals

Aílton José Almeida (born 20 August 1984), simply known as Aílton (Brazilian Portuguese: [aˈiwtõ]), is a Brazilian former footballer who played as a forward.

== Club career ==
=== Örgryte IS ===
He moved to F.C. Copenhagen from Swedish Örgryte IS on 1 January 2007 for 22 million Danish kroner, which by then was a transfer record for a Danish club. Both F.C. Copenhagen and Brøndby IF struggled for Almeida's signature, but after some hesitation from Brøndby IF, he ended up at F.C. Copenhagen.

=== F.C. Copenhagen ===
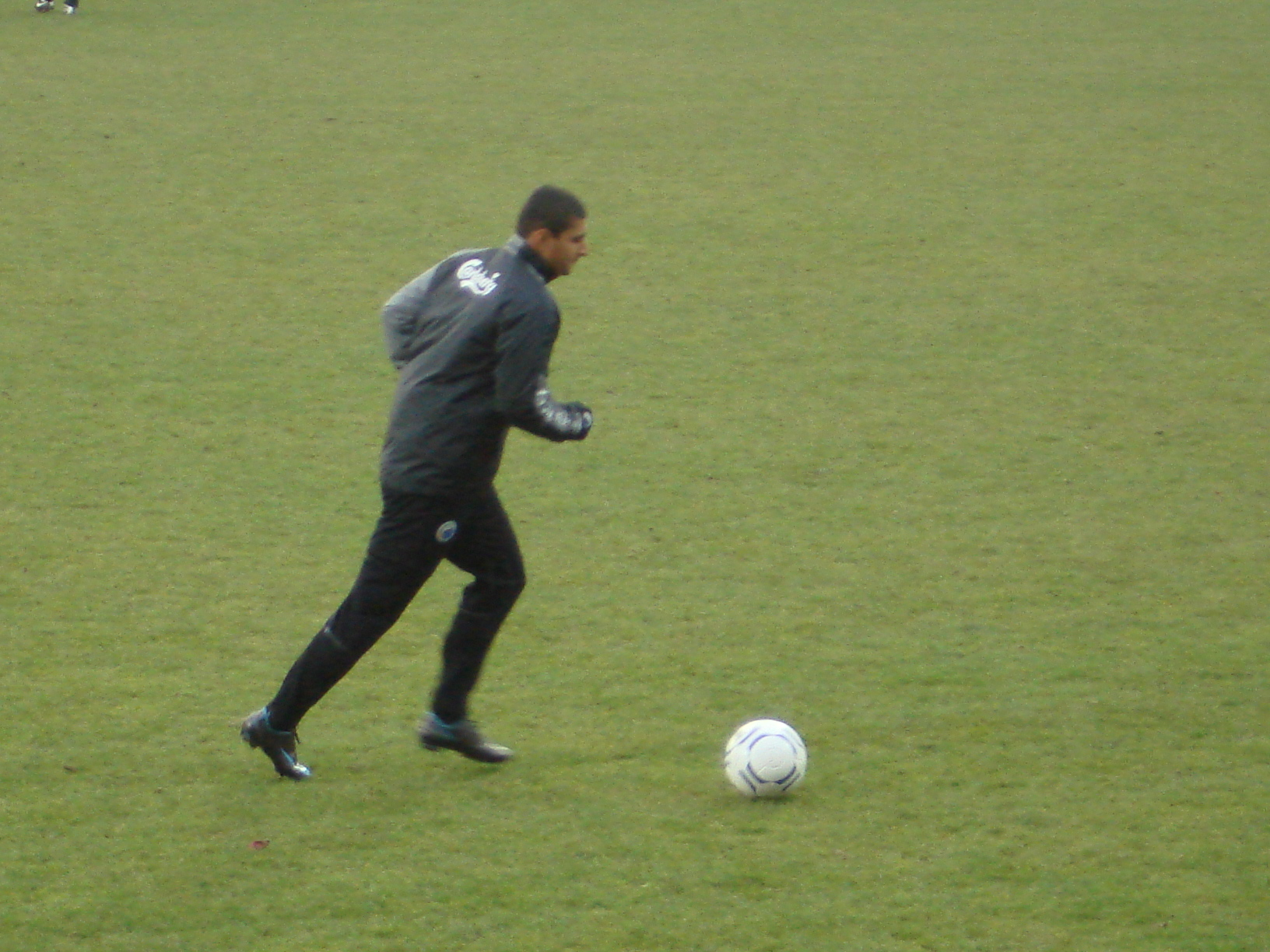
Aílton training with Copenhagen in 2008

Scoring in his only second game for F.C. Copenhagen against Brøndby IF in one of the New Firm matches, he was considered a new star and a start of a new era for the club, which for many years had suffered from a lack of goals from the strikers. However, he did not manage to follow up on his performances, and was subsequently placed on the bench as a substitute. On 15 April 2007, Ailton scored with a bicycle kick in F.C. Copenhagen's 4–2 win over OB, which led to many people thinking his breakthrough was finally about to come, but he yet again had to see himself become a substitute.

After the winter break in the 2007–08 season Aílton got a chance in the Danish Cup quarterfinals, where F.C. Copenhagen was to face Næstved BK. He scored a goal in the beginning of the second half following an assist from his countryman José Júnior.

In the beginning of the 2008–09 season he had been playing regularly, becoming an important member of the starting line-up and the attacking play, however, he still had trouble finding the net. He however started against FC Midtjylland on 16 November 2008 and scored two goals. He scored again against Manchester City in an UEFA Cup match home at Parken. During the season, he scored 11 goals in the league and 4 goals in the cup, being influential in securing the cup and the league titles.

During the next season he appeared in 39 matches and scored 8 goals in all competitions, helping F.C. Copenhagen to win the league again, and reach the knockout phase of the season's Europa League.

=== APOEL ===
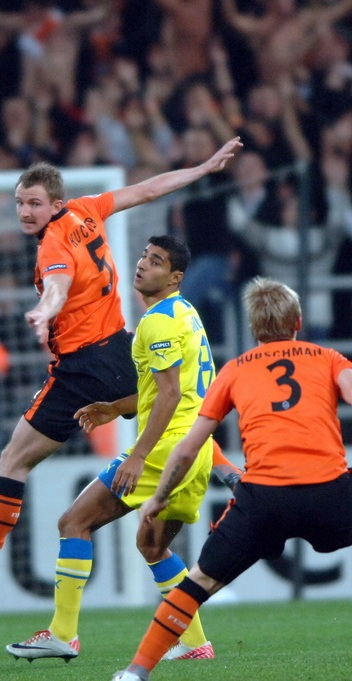
Aílton (centre) playing for APOEL in a Champions League Group Stage match against Shakhtar Donetsk in 2011

On 28 July 2010, Aílton signed a three-year contract with APOEL. A transfer fee of €700,000 was paid to F.C. Copenhagen, which is the transfer record in the history of APOEL. He made his debut on 5 August 2010 against FK Jablonec in the UEFA Europa League 3rd qualifying round. He scored his first goal with APOEL on 26 August 2010 against Getafe CF on the UEFA Europa League play-off round, in a match which ended 1–1 after extra time. Ailton had a very good first season with APOEL. He played in all championship matches and scored 7 goals, helping his new club to win the 2010–11 Cypriot First Division. After the three championship titles which he won with F.C. Copenhagen, he won his fourth consecutive championship title, this time with APOEL. He was voted by Cyprus Football Association as the player of the season (MVP) 2010–11 in the Cypriot First Division.

He started the 2011–12 season in fine form, scoring 4 goals in the UEFA Champions League qualifying rounds that helped APOEL qualify for the group stage of the 2011–12 UEFA Champions League. In the first group stage match against Zenit Saint Petersburg on 13 September 2011, he scored the winner 75 minutes in as his side came from behind to claim a 2–1 victory. On 19 October 2011, he scored the equaliser 19 minutes in as APOEL snatched a 1–1 draw at FC Porto. He followed up on that success by scoring from the spot in his side's 2–1 victory over FC Porto in the reverse encounter in Nicosia He also appeared in the round-of-16 triumph over Olympique Lyonnais where he converted his attempt in the penalty shootout. In total, he scored three goals in the group phase and seven overall in the competition, as the club reached the quarter-finals for the first time ever.

He made his last two appearances for APOEL in the 2012–13 season against Aalesunds FK for the second qualifying round of the 2012–13 UEFA Europa League, appearing in both legs and scoring the opening goal in APOEL's 2–0 first leg home win.

=== Terek Grozny ===
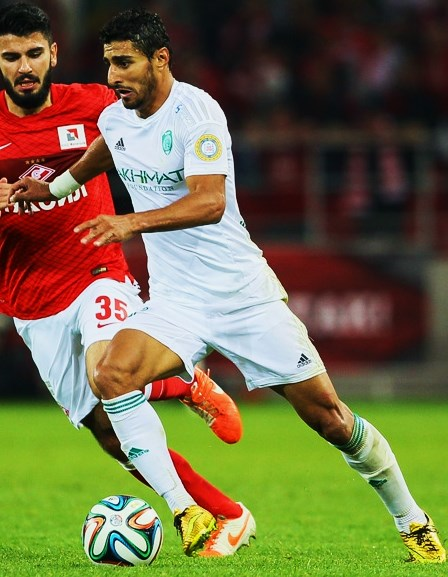
Aílton (right) playing for Terek Grozny in 2014

On 5 September 2012, Aílton joined the Russian side Terek Grozny on a three-year contract, after he completed his transfer from APOEL for a fee reportedly in the region of €2.2 million, which was the transfer record for a Cypriot club. On 14 September 2012, he made his debut for Terek. He opened the score in a 2–0 away win over the reigning champions Zenit St. Petersburg.

=== Al-Hilal ===
In July 2015, he joined Al-Hilal on a one-year contract. Ailton was given Shirt #9 in the league and domestic cups and #99 in the AFC

==== Saudia Domestic Competitions ====
Hilal Winning - Saudi Super Cup 2015 Win

- Ailton helped Al Hilal win the Saudi Super Cup, game played vs Derby rivals Al Nasser Club in Saudi Professional League.

==== 2015/16 Saudi Pro League ====
Ailton scored 1 Goal in a Saudi Professional League's game against Al Wahda Club Club. Al Hilal Won that game 2–0.

Ailton scored 1 goal in a Saudi Professional League's game against Al Fateh Club. Al Hilal Won that game 2–1.

==== 2015 Asian Champions League ====
Ailton joined Hilal as they were attempting to qualify for the semi-finals of the Asian Champions League. In the quarter-finals game, Al Hilal played against Lakhwia FC of Qatar.

==== Quarter-finals ====
Ailton scored 1 goal, and Al Hilal Won 4–1 in first leg of the quarter finals.

In the second leg Hilal drew with Lakhwia FC 2-2

=== Return to Örgryte and retirement ===
On 28 January 2019, Aílton returned to Örgryte IS, competing in Superettan, signing a three-year contract. On 29 September 2022, he announced his retirement from professional football.

== Career statistics ==
Appearances and goals by club, season and competition
| Club | Season | League | | | Cup | | League Cup | | Continental | | Other | | Total | |
| Club | Season | Division | Apps | Goals | Apps | Goals | Apps | Goals | Apps | Goals | Apps | Goals | Apps | Goals |
|---|---|---|---|---|---|---|---|---|---|---|---|---|---|---|
| Örgryte | 2004 | Allsvenskan | 22 | 8 | | | — | | — | | — | | 22 | 8 |
| Örgryte | 2005 | Allsvenskan | 23 | 13 | | | — | | — | | — | | 23 | 13 |
| Örgryte | 2006 | Allsvenskan | 18 | 4 | | | — | | — | | — | | 18 | 4 |
| Örgryte | Total | | 63 | 25 | | | — | | — | | — | | 63 | 25 |
| Copenhagen | 2006–07 | Danish Superliga | 12 | 3 | 3 | 1 | — | | — | | — | | 15 | 4 |
| Copenhagen | 2007–08 | Danish Superliga | 25 | 3 | 4 | 2 | — | | 6 | 0 | — | | 35 | 5 |
| Copenhagen | 2008–09 | Danish Superliga | 29 | 11 | 4 | 4 | — | | 9 | 3 | — | | 42 | 18 |
| Copenhagen | 2009–10 | Danish Superliga | 25 | 4 | 2 | 1 | — | | 12 | 3 | — | | 39 | 8 |
| Copenhagen | 2010–11 | Danish Superliga | 1 | 0 | 0 | 0 | — | | 0 | 0 | — | | 1 | 0 |
| Copenhagen | Total | | 92 | 21 | 13 | 8 | — | | 27 | 6 | — | | 132 | 35 |
| APOEL | 2010–11 | Cypriot First Division | 31 | 7 | 2 | 0 | — | | 3 | 1 | — | | 36 | 8 |
| APOEL | 2011–12 | Cypriot First Division | 21 | 4 | 1 | 0 | — | | 14 | 7 | — | | 36 | 11 |
| APOEL | 2012–13 | Cypriot First Division | 0 | 0 | 0 | 0 | — | | 2 | 1 | — | | 2 | 1 |
| APOEL | Total | | 52 | 11 | 3 | 0 | — | | 19 | 9 | — | | 74 | 20 |
| Terek Grozny | 2012–13 | Russian Premier League | 23 | 8 | 3 | 2 | — | | — | | — | | 26 | 10 |
| Terek Grozny | 2013–14 | Russian Premier League | 31 | 8 | 2 | 0 | — | | — | | — | | 33 | 8 |
| Terek Grozny | 2014–15 | Russian Premier League | 30 | 5 | 1 | 0 | — | | — | | — | | 31 | 5 |
| Terek Grozny | Total | | 84 | 21 | 6 | 2 | — | | — | | — | | 90 | 24 |
| Al-Hilal | 2015–16 | Saudi Professional League | 15 | 4 | 2 | 2 | — | | 6 | 3 | 3 | 2 | 26 | 11 |
| Al Jazira | 2016–17 | UAE Pro League | 21 | 6 | 2 | 0 | 3 | 2 | 6 | 0 | — | | 32 | 8 |
| Al Dhafra | 2017–18 | UAE Pro League | 14 | 7 | 1 | 0 | 1 | 0 | — | | — | | 16 | 7 |
| Örgryte | 2019 | Superettan | 28 | 7 | 4 | 0 | — | | — | | — | | 32 | 7 |
| Örgryte | 2020 | Superettan | 25 | 6 | 3 | 0 | — | | — | | — | | 28 | 6 |
| Örgryte | 2021 | Superettan | 23 | 4 | 0 | 0 | — | | — | | — | | 18 | 4 |
| Örgryte | Total | | 76 | 17 | 7 | 0 | — | | — | | — | | 83 | 17 |
| Career total | | | 417 | 112 | 34 | 12 | 4 | 2 | 58 | 18 | 3 | 2 | 516 | 149 |

== Honours ==
=== Club ===
Copenhagen

- Danish Superliga: 2006–07, 2008–09, 2009–10
- Danish Cup: 2008–09

APOEL

- Cypriot First Division: 2010–11
- Cypriot Super Cup: 2011

Al-Hilal

- Saudi Crown Prince Cup: 2015–16
- Saudi Super Cup: 2015

=== Individual ===
- Danish Superliga Spring Profile: 2009
- Cypriot First Division Player of the season: 2010–11
