= Zdeněk Pospěch =

Czech footballer (born 1978)

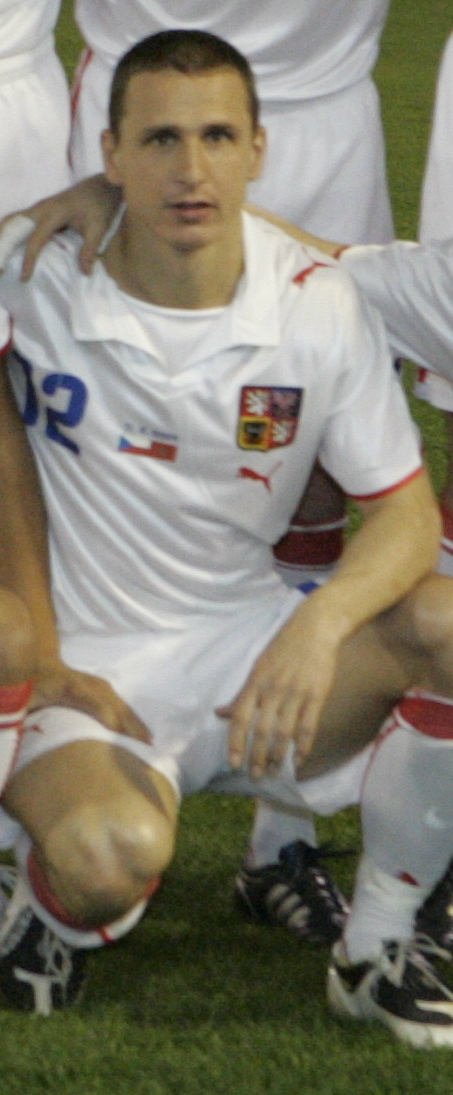

Personal information
- Date of birth: 14 December 1978 (age 47)
- Place of birth: Opava, Czechoslovakia
- Height: 1.74 m (5 ft 9 in)
- Position: Right back

Youth career
- 1985–1991: FK Kylešovice
- 1991–1996: SFC Opava

Senior career*
Years	Team	Apps	(Gls)
1996–2001	SFC Opava	34	(3)
1997–1998	→ Dukla Hranice (loan)	18	(2)
1998–1999	→ Fotbal Třinec (loan)	20	(2)
1999	→ FC NH Ostrava (loan)	15	(1)
2001–2005	Baník Ostrava	114	(20)
2005–2007	Sparta Prague	72	(6)
2008–2011	F.C. Copenhagen	108	(13)
2011–2014	Mainz 05	82	(1)
2014–2017	SFC Opava	59	(5)
Total		522	(53)

International career
2005–2011	Czech Republic	31	(2)
- * Club domestic league appearances and goals

Zdeněk Pospěch (Czech pronunciation: [ˈzdɛɲɛk ˈpospjɛx]; born 14 December 1978) is a Czech former professional footballer. He normally played as a defender in a right back position, but could also play on the right side of midfield.

Pospěch spent much of his early professional career in the Czech Republic before moving abroad to play for Danish club F.C. Copenhagen in 2008, and German club Mainz three years later. He also represented the Czech Republic national football team at UEFA Euro 2008.

== Club career ==
Pospěch started his professional career in SFC Opava. After two loan-out deals to FK Dukla Hranice and Fotbal Třinec he moved to FC Baník Ostrava in 2001. After four years in Ostrava, he moved on to Sparta Prague. In 2005, he made his national team debut in a friendly match against Sweden.

On 23 January 2008, his €1.9 million move to Danish F.C. Copenhagen were announced. Here he joined his friend Libor Sionko.

In the 2010–11 UEFA Champions League, Pospěch was named in UEFA's "Team of the week".

He signed for Bundesliga side 1. FSV Mainz 05 on a two-year-contract on 28 February 2011 and joined after the 2010–11 season when his contract with Copenhagen expired.

In July 2014 he returned to SFC Opava which played in the Czech second division and where he started with professional football.

== International career ==
On 17 August 2005, Pospech made his debut in the senior team of the Czech Republic, as he played one half of the match in a 1–2 defeat against Sweden. In October 2007, he made his third appearances for the national team starting in a 3–0 win at the Allianz Arena against Germany in qualifying for Euro 2008. With the win against the already qualified German team, the Czech Republic had also qualified to compete in the European Championships and won the championship lead, which no longer blazes the team until the end of the qualification, which was synonymous with the group winners. In May 2008 Pospech was nominated together with Libor Sionko (also standing at this time F.C. Copenhagen under contract) in the squad for Euro 2008. However, he came in this tournament to no use.

In the qualifying matches for the 2010 World Cup he played seven times scoring one goal, while the team failed to qualify for the World Cup.

To March 2011 Pospech before played in all games in qualifying for Euro 2012, before then in August of that year with the Czech team in a friendly match in Oslo against Norway 0–3 loss, but the team is one of the worst performances showed in recent years. He was then replaced by Theodor Gebre Selassie from the starting line and Pospech played only four times in the remaining six games in the 2011 calendar year. On 15 November 2011, Pospech played for the last time for the senior team of the Czech Republic, as he came on the pitch in the second leg of the European Championship qualification Barrage against Montenegro.

== Honours ==
- Gambrinus liga: 2003–04, 2006–07
- Czech Cup: 2004–05, 2005–06, 2006–07, 2007–08
- Danish Superliga: 2008–09, 2009–10, 2010–11
- Danish Cup: 2008–09
