= Libor Sionko =

Czech footballer (born 1977)

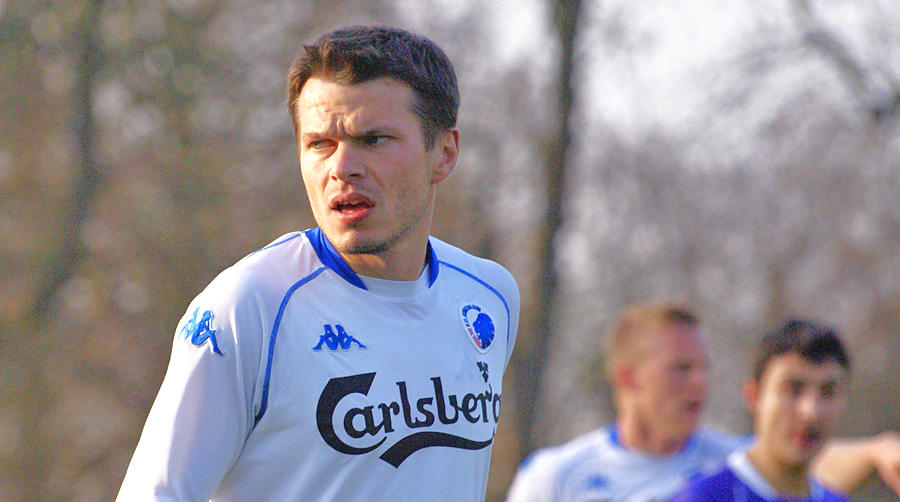
- Libor Sionko

Personal information
- Full name: Libor Sionko
- Date of birth: 1 February 1977 (age 49)
- Place of birth: Ostrava, Czechoslovakia
- Height: 1.71 m (5 ft 7 in)
- Position: Right winger

Youth career
- 1984–1986: TJ Vítkovice
- 1986–1993: Baník Ostrava

Senior career*
Years	Team	Apps	(Gls)
1993–1994	Banik Ostrava	1	(0)
1994–1996	TŽ Třinec	12	(3)
1996–1997	VTJ Znojmo	0	(0)
1997–1999	Banik Ostrava	45	(11)
1999–2004	Sparta Prague	95	(25)
2004	Grazer AK	15	(2)
2004–2006	Austria Wien	63	(8)
2006–2007	Rangers	18	(3)
2007–2009	F.C. Copenhagen	54	(9)
2010–2012	Sparta Prague	40	(7)
Total		343	(68)

International career
1998–2000	Czech Republic U21	19	(7)
1999–2010	Czech Republic	41	(8)
- * Club domestic league appearances and goals

Libor Sionko (born 1 February 1977) is a Czech former professional footballer who played as a midfielder. At club level he started in his home town of Ostrava, playing for the youth teams of TJ Vítkovice and Baník Ostrava. Professionally, he played in his native country until 2004, featuring for clubs including Ostrava and Sparta Prague. He then went abroad, playing in Austria for Grazer AK and Austria Wien before heading to Scotland where he played for Rangers. He subsequently had a spell in Denmark with F.C. Copenhagen before returning to the Czech Republic to finish his career with Sparta, where he last played before retiring in 2012.

Internationally Sionko made his debut for the Czech Republic in 1999 and took part in three tournaments, in particular the 2000 Olympics, the 2006 World Cup and Euro 2008. He played sporadically until 2010, finishing his career with 8 goals from 41 games.

== Club career ==
=== Early career ===
Born in Ostrava, Sionko started playing for TJ Vítkovice and Baník Ostrava as a youth.

In 1999, he signed with Sparta Prague. He played successfully for Sparta in the Czech First League and the UEFA Champions League, progressing from twice (1999–00 and 2003–04) from the Champions League group stage.

Sionko left Prague, due to contract problems, to join Austrian club Grazer AK in February 2004, helping to achieve the first ever Austrian championship for the Styrians. He also was in the team winning the Austrian Cup for the 4th time. After that remarkable success and change to Austria Vienna, he was a principal for a very successful challenge in the 2004–05 UEFA Cup, when the Viennese side reached the quarter-final. In 2005–06 the Czech player was an Austrian double winner a second time.

=== Rangers & Copenhagen ===
Sionko completed a Bosman transfer to Rangers on 16 May 2006 on a three-year contract.

He scored on his Scottish Premiership debut against Motherwell on 30 July 2006 in the Gers' 2–1 win. Frequent injury, however, meant that he was used intermittently by Paul Le Guen. He re-established himself in the team in December 2006 where he scored against Hibernian and Aberdeen, as Rangers' form improved after a poor start to the season.

After making 24 appearances for Rangers in his first season, Sionko signed a two-year contract with Danish champions F.C. Copenhagen in the summer of 2007.

On 4 August came Sionko's debut for the club, where he assisted in the single goal at the 1–0 victory away against AGF. His first goal for the club came in his second match, and his home debut at Parken Stadium, against Esbjerg fB notching a 5–2 victory. Afterwards he started the next six matches at the bench, but on 23 September he was back in the lineup in his first New Firm Derby against Brøndby IF. This match ended 1–0 for FCK, the goal assisted by Sionko. Afterwards he has scored twice in a cup match against FC Fredericia and once against Lyngby Boldklub – in both matches he was named man of match.

Following the Lyngby match, Sionko told fck.dk that his family had settled down well in Copenhagen and that he called Copenhagen his second home.

=== Sparta Prague ===
Sionko was rarely used in F.C. Copenhagen's first team in the autumn of 2009, and in January 2010 he was released from his contract and subsequently signed with Sparta Prague. The midfielder has signed with the Czech club a contract until June 2012, after being released by the Danish club.

He retired on 27 August 2012 after failing to find a new club after his Sparta Prague contract ran out.

== International career ==
Sionko has represented his country at Under 17, Under 18, Under 20 and Under 21 level as well as playing twice in an unofficial friendly tournament in May 1998. He earned his first full cap in a friendly against Poland on 24 April 1999 and has been capped 41 times by the Czech Republic national team, scoring 8 goals. He had been only a substitute for a long time, because his position of right winger was occupied by Karel Poborský.

=== 2000 Olympics ===
Sionko played in all three games at the 2000 Olympics as the Czechs drew with the United States and Cameroon and lost to Kuwait, meaning they were eliminated at the group stage and finished bottom of their group.

=== 2006 World Cup ===
He was called up to the Czech team for the 2006 World Cup due to Vladimír Šmicer being injured; however he only featured as a late substitute role in some games as the Czechs were knocked out in the group stage of the competition. Sionko's World Cup debut came against Ghana on 17 June 2006. Ghana won the game 2–0.

=== Euro 2008 ===
On 11 June, Sionko scored for the Czech Republic in their second game of Euro 2008, a 1–3 defeat to Portugal which sent the Portuguese through to the quarter-finals of the tournament. Sionko equalised in the 17th minute after Deco had opened the scoring in the 8th minute. However, Cristiano Ronaldo and Ricardo Quaresma added two further goals for their team in the second half to leave the Czechs to battle it out with Turkey in the final game of Group A.

=== International goals ===
Scores and results list the Czech Republic's goal tally first, score column indicates score after each Sionko goal.

List of international goals scored by Libor Sionko
No.	Date	Venue	Opponent	Score	Result	Competition
1	12 November 2003	Na Stínadlech, Teplice, Czech Republic	Canada	4–0	5–1	Friendly
2	6 September 2006	Tehelné pole, Bratislava, Slovakia	Slovakia	1–0	3–0	UEFA Euro 2008 qualifying
3	6 September 2006	Tehelné pole, Bratislava, Slovakia	Slovakia	2–0	3–0	UEFA Euro 2008 qualifying
4	17 October 2007	Allianz Arena, Munich, Germany	Germany	1–0	3–0	UEFA Euro 2008 qualifying
5	30 May 2008	Letná, Prague, Czech Republic	Scotland	1–0	3–1	Friendly
6	30 May 2008	Letná, Prague, Czech Republic	Scotland	3–1	3–1	Friendly
7	11 June 2008	Stade de Genève, Geneva, Switzerland	Portugal	1–1	3–1	UEFA Euro 2008
8	15 October 2008	Na Stínadlech, Teplice, Czech Republic	Slovenia	1–0	1–0	2010 FIFA World Cup qualifying

== Honours ==
- Austrian Football Bundesliga: 2003–04, 2005–06
- Austrian Cup: 2003–04, 2004–05, 2005–06
- Danish Superliga: 2008–09
- Danish Cup: 2008–09
- Czech First League: 1999–2000, 2000–01, 2002–03
- Czech Cup: 2003–04
