= F.C. Copenhagen Player of the Year =

The F.C. Copenhagen Player of the Year award is voted for annually by the members of the official fan club for F.C. Copenhagen, FCKFC, in recognition of the best overall performance by an individual player throughout the football season. Towards the end of each season, members are invited to cast their votes for this award. The winner is the player who polls the most votes. The recipient is awarded a diploma, presented on the pitch before one of the last home games of the season.

The inaugural award was given to Palle Petersen at the end of the club's first season. This award is as old as the club.

== Winners ==
Player name in bold text represents players still on the playing staff of the club.

Season	Name	Age	Position (Note: For a full description of positions see Football Positions.)	Nationality	International Caps (Note: If blank, uncapped at full international level.) (Note: As of 2017-05-29)	Current club
2026	**Junnosuke Suzuki**	22	Defender	Japan	6	(Denmark) F.C. Copenhagen
2025	**Victor Froholdt**	19	Midfielder	Denmark	8	(Portugal) FC Porto
2024	**Kevin Diks**	27	Defender	Indonesia	1	(Germany) Borussia Mönchengladbach
2023	**Kamil Grabara**	24	Goalkeeper	Poland	1	(Germany) VfL Wolfsburg
2022	Pep Biel	25	Midfielder	Spain		(United States) Charlotte FC
2021	Zeca (2)	33	Midfielder	Greece	2	retired
2020	Zeca	32	Midfielder	Greece	2	retired
2019	Robert Skov	26	Midfielder	Denmark	14	(Germany) Union Berlin
2018	Viktor Fischer	27	Midfielder	Denmark	21	retired
2017	Mathias Jørgensen	27	Defender	Denmark	35	(Denmark) F.C. Copenhagen
2016	Thomas Delaney (2)	24	Midfielder	Denmark	72	(Denmark) F.C. Copenhagen
2015	Thomas Delaney	23	Midfielder	Denmark	72	(Denmark) F.C. Copenhagen
2014	Pierre Bengtsson	26	Defender	Sweden	24	retired
2013	**Andreas Cornelius**	20	Forward	Denmark	44	(Denmark) F.C. Copenhagen
2012	Johan Wiland	31	Goalkeeper	Sweden	9	retired
2011	Dame N'Doye	26	Forward	Senegal	26	retired
2010	Atiba Hutchinson	27	Midfielder	Canada	77	retired
2009	Hjalte Nørregaard (2)	28	Midfielder	Denmark	4	retired
2008	Libor Sionko	31	Midfielder	Czech Republic	41	retired
2007	Marcus Allbäck	33	Forward	Sweden	74	retired
2006	Tobias Linderoth	27	Midfielder	Sweden	76	retired
2005	Hjalte Nørregaard	24	Midfielder	Denmark	4	retired
2004	Álvaro Santos	24	Forward	Brazil		retired
2003	Peter Nielsen	35	Midfielder	Denmark	10	retired
2002	Christian Poulsen	22	Midfielder	Denmark	92	retired
2001	Sibusiso Zuma	25	Forward	South Africa	67	retired
2000	Michael Mio Nielsen	35	Defender	Denmark	1	retired
1999	David Nielsen	22	Forward	Denmark		retired
1998	Bjarne Goldbæk	29	Midfielder	Denmark	28	retired
1997	Antti Niemi	25	Goalkeeper	Finland	67	retired
1996	Christian Lønstrup	25	Midfielder	Denmark		retired
1995	Michael Johansen	22	Midfielder	Denmark	2	retired
1994	Lars Højer	23	Midfielder	Denmark	1	retired
1993	Palle Petersen	34	Goalkeeper	Denmark		retired

== Wins by playing position ==
Position	Number of winners
Goalkeeper	4
Defender	3
Midfielder	18
Forward	6
