= 2012–13 F.C. Copenhagen season =

F.C. Copenhagen
2012–13 season
- Chairman: Hans Munk Nielsen; John Dueholm
- Manager: Ariël Jacobs
- Danish Superliga: Champions
- Danish Cup: Fifth round
- UEFA Champions League: Play-off round
- UEFA Europa League: Group stage
- Top goalscorer: League: Andreas Cornelius (16); All: Andreas Cornelius (18)
- Highest home attendance: 33,215 (vs SønderjyskE, 20 May 2013)
- Lowest home attendance: 8,542 (vs Horsens, 15 March 2013)
- Average home league attendance: 16,006
| Home colours | Away colours |

This article shows statistics of individual players for the football club F.C. Copenhagen. It also lists all matches that F.C. Copenhagen played in the 2012–13 season.

== Players ==
=== Squad information ===
This section shows the squad as currently constituted, considering all players who are confirmedly moved in and out (see section Players in / out).

| N | Pos. | Nat. | Name | Age | EU | Since | App | Goals | Ends | Transfer fee | Notes |
|---|---|---|---|---|---|---|---|---|---|---|---|
| 1 | GK | (Denmark) | K. Christensen | 47 | EU | 2010 | 28 | 0 | 2013 | Undisclosed | |
| 2 | RB | (Denmark) | L. Jacobsen | 47 | EU | 2011 | 228 | 4 | 2014 | Free | |
| 3 | LB | (Sweden) | Bengtsson | 38 | EU | 2011 (Winter) | 87 | 1 | 2014 | Undisclosed | |
| 4 | CB | (Denmark) | Stadsgaard | 41 | EU | 2012 (Winter) | 52 | 2 | 2016 | Free | |
| 5 | CB | (Iceland) | Ottesen | 42 | EU | 2010 | 65 | 13 | 2013 | DKK 7m | |
| 6 | CM | (Brazil) | Claudemir | 38 | Non-EU | 2010 | 122 | 11 | 2015 | DKK 7m | |
| 7 | CF | (Norway) | Abdellaoue | 38 | EU | 2012 (Winter) | 18 | 5 | 2016 | Undisclosed | |
| 8 | CM | (Norway) | Grindheim | 43 | EU | 2011 | 57 | 0 | 2014 | DKK 6m | |
| 9 | CF | (Belgium) | Vetokele | 34 | EU | 2012 | 19 | 4 | 2016 | DKK 8m | |
| 11 | LW | (Brazil) | Santin | 45 | Non-EU | 2008 | 207 | 79 | 2014 | DKK 15m | |
| 12 | CB | (Sweden) | Larsson | 42 | EU | 2008 | 37 | 0 | 2013 | DKK 15m | |
| 12 | CM | (Denmark) | Jensen | 47 | EU | 2013 | 10 | 0 | 2013 | Free | |
| 13 | LW | (Senegal) | Diouf | 40 | EU | 2011 | 34 | 6 | 2015 | DKK 18m | |
| 14 | SS | (Senegal) | N'Doye | 41 | EU | 2009 (Winter) | 150 | 83 | 2014 | DKK 15m | |
| 15 | CB | (Denmark) | M. Jakobsen | 40 | EU | 2012 | 9 | 0 | 2016 | Undisclosed | |
| 16 | CM | (Denmark) | T. Kristensen | 43 | EU | 2008 | 185 | 7 | 2014 | Undisclosed | |
| 17 | CB | (Iceland) | Sigurðsson | 40 | EU | 2011 | 80 | 4 | 2015 | DKK 6m | |
| 18 | LW | (Denmark) | Jørgensen | 35 | EU | 2012 | 36 | 12 | 2016 | Undisclosed | |
| 19 | LB | (Costa Rica) | Oviedo | 36 | Non-EU | 2010 | 46 | 2 | 2013 | Undisclosed | |
| 19 | RW | (Iceland) | Gíslason | 38 | EU | 2012 | 20 | 1 | 2016 | Undisclosed | |
| 20 | AM | (Denmark) | Vingaard | 41 | EU | 2009 (Winter) | 141 | 23 | 2014 | DKK 8m | |
| 21 | GK | (Sweden) | Wiland | 45 | EU | 2009 (Winter) | 152 | 0 | 2014 | DKK 8m | |
| 22 | LW | (Denmark) | Absalonsen | 41 | EU | 2011 | 16 | 0 | 2013 | Free | |
| 23 | AM | (Denmark) | Frederiksen | 37 | EU | 2010 | 4 | 2 | 2013 | DKK 2m | |
| 24 | AM | (Denmark) | Toutouh | 34 | EU | 2011 | 4 | 0 | 2014 | Free | |
| 25 | RB | (Denmark) | Remmer | 33 | EU | 2012 | 6 | 0 | 2015 | Youth system | |
| 26 | RB | (Costa Rica) | Gamboa | 36 | Non-EU | 2011 | 2 | 0 | 2015 | Undisclosed | |
| 27 | CM | (Denmark) | Delaney | 35 | EU | 2009 | 92 | 4 | 2014 | Youth system | |
| 28 | CM | (Denmark) | Bergvold | 42 | EU | 2010 | 113 | 9 | 2013 | Free | |
| 29 | CF | (Denmark) | Cornelius | 33 | EU | 2012 | 46 | 20 | 2016 | Youth system | |
| 30 | RM | (Costa Rica) | Bolaños | 42 | Non-EU | 2010 | 110 | 15 | 2014 | DKK 7m | |
| 31 | GK | (Denmark) | Busk | 33 | EU | 2012 | 1 | 0 | 2015 | Youth system | |

- Last updated: 20 May
- Source: F.C. Copenhagen, players' Wikipedia articles, fck_kontrakter (for contract endings)
- Ordered by squad number.

=== Squad stats ===
| | | | | Total | | | Champions League | | Danish Superliga | | Danish Cup | | UEFA Europa League | |
| No. | Pos. | Nat. | Name | Sts | App | Gls | App | Gls | App | Gls | App | Gls | App | Gls |
|---|---|---|---|---|---|---|---|---|---|---|---|---|---|---|
| 21 | GK | (Sweden) | Wiland | 27 | 27 | | 4 | | 21 | | | | 2 | |
| 2 | RB | (Denmark) | L. Jacobsen | 41 | 41 | | 4 | | 30 | | 1 | | 6 | |
| 17 | CB | (Iceland) | Sigurðsson | 41 | 41 | 3 | 4 | | 31 | 3 | | | 6 | |
| 4 | CB | (Denmark) | Stadsgaard | 38 | 38 | 2 | 2 | | 27 | 2 | 3 | | 6 | |
| 3 | LB | (Sweden) | Bengtsson | 36 | 40 | 1 | 3 | | 29 | 1 | 2 | | 6 | |
| 30 | RM | (Costa Rica) | Bolaños | 29 | 32 | 4 | 4 | 1 | 23 | 2 | 1 | 1 | 4 | |
| 16 | CM | (Denmark) | T. Kristensen | 37 | 40 | 2 | 4 | | 27 | | 3 | 2 | 6 | |
| 6 | CM | (Brazil) | Claudemir | 40 | 42 | 3 | 4 | | 31 | 2 | 1 | | 6 | 1 |
| 18 | LW | (Denmark) | Jørgensen | 28 | 36 | 12 | 4 | 1 | 27 | 11 | 1 | | 4 | |
| 11 | LW | (Brazil) | Santin | 37 | 45 | 15 | 4 | 2 | 32 | 11 | 3 | 1 | 6 | 1 |
| 29 | CF | (Denmark) | Cornelius | 36 | 44 | 20 | 4 | | 32 | 18 | 2 | 1 | 6 | 1 |
| 27 | CM | (Denmark) | Delaney | 21 | 32 | 1 | 2 | | 21 | 1 | 3 | | 6 | |
| 20 | AM | (Denmark) | Vingaard | 14 | 27 | 3 | 3 | | 19 | 3 | 3 | | 2 | |
| 19 | RW | (Iceland) | Gíslason | 13 | 20 | 1 | | | 14 | | 2 | | 4 | 1 |
| 1 | GK | (Denmark) | K. Christensen | 18 | 19 | | | | 12 | | 3 | | 4 | |
| 9 | CF | (Belgium) | Vetokele | 5 | 19 | 4 | 1 | | 15 | 3 | 1 | | 2 | 1 |
| 32 | ST | (Denmark) | Amankwaa | 2 | 13 | 1 | | | 9 | | 3 | 1 | 1 | |
| 8 | CM | (Norway) | Grindheim | 4 | 12 | | 1 | | 7 | | 2 | | 2 | |
| 12 | CM | (Denmark) | Jensen | 5 | 10 | | | | 10 | | | | | |
| 15 | CB | (Denmark) | M. Jakobsen | 8 | 10 | | | | 7 | | 3 | | | |
| 19 | LB | (Costa Rica) | Oviedo | 8 | 10 | 1 | 4 | | 6 | 1 | | | | |
| 5 | CB | (Iceland) | Ottesen | 8 | 9 | 1 | 2 | | 6 | 1 | 1 | | | |
| 7 | CF | (Norway) | Abdellaoue | 3 | 7 | 2 | | | 5 | 2 | 2 | | | |
| 25 | RB | (Denmark) | Remmer | 5 | 6 | | | | 4 | | 2 | | | |
| 28 | CM | (Denmark) | Bergvold | 1 | 2 | | | | 2 | | | | | |
| 31 | GK | (Denmark) | Busk | 1 | 1 | | | | 1 | | | | | |
| 34 | RB | (Denmark) | Aaquist | | 1 | | | | 1 | | | | | |
| 35 | CM | (Denmark) | Wohlgemuth | 1 | 1 | | | | 1 | | | | | |
| 12 | CB | (Sweden) | Larsson | | | | | | | | | | | |
| 13 | LW | (Senegal) | Diouf | | | | | | | | | | | |
| 14 | SS | (Senegal) | N'Doye | | | | | | | | | | | |
| 22 | LW | (Denmark) | Absalonsen | | | | | | | | | | | |
| 23 | AM | (Denmark) | Frederiksen | | | | | | | | | | | |
| 24 | AM | (Denmark) | Toutouh | | | | | | | | | | | |
| 26 | RB | (Costa Rica) | Gamboa | | | | | | | | | | | |

Last updated: 20 May
Source: FCK.dk
Ordered by Starting 11 then appearances
0 shown as blank

=== Players in / out ===
==== In ====
| No. | Pos. | Nat. | Name | Age | EU | Moving from | Type | Transfer window | Ends | Transfer fee | Source |
|---|---|---|---|---|---|---|---|---|---|---|---|
| 25 | RB | (Denmark) | Remmer | 19 | EU | Youth system | Promoted | Summer | 2014 | Youth system | FCK.dk |
| 29 | CF | (Denmark) | Cornelius | 19 | EU | Youth system | Promoted | Summer | 2015 | Youth system | FCK.dk |
| 31 | GK | (Denmark) | Busk | 18 | EU | Youth system | Promoted | Summer | 2013 | Youth system | FCK.dk |
| 22 | LW | (Denmark) | Absalonsen | 26 | EU | Horsens | End of loan | Summer | 2013 | n/a | |
| 23 | AM | (Denmark) | Frederiksen | 22 | EU | Vejle Kolding | End of loan | Summer | 2013 | n/a | |
| 28 | CM | (Denmark) | Bergvold | 28 | EU | Lyngby Boldklub | End of loan | Summer | 2013 | n/a | |
| 18 | LW | (Denmark) | Jørgensen | 21 | EU | Bayer Leverkusen (Germany) | Loan | Summer | 2013 | n/a | FCK.dk |
| 15 | CB | (Denmark) | M. Jakobsen | 26 | EU | Almería (Spain) | Transfer | Summer | 2016 | Undisclosed | FCK.dk |
| 9 | CF | (Belgium) | Vetokele | 20 | EU | Cercle Brugge (Belgium) | Transfer | Summer | 2016 | DKK 7,500,000 | FCK.dk |
| 19 | RW | (Iceland) | Gíslason | 24 | EU | OB | Transfer | Summer | 2016 | Undisclosed | FCK.dk |
| 18 | LW | (Denmark) | Jørgensen | 21 | EU | Bayer Leverkusen (Germany) | Transfer | Summer | 2016 | Undisclosed | FCK.dk |
| 13 | LW | (Senegal) | Diouf | 26 | Non-EU | Molde (Norway) | End of loan | Winter | 2015 | n/a | |
| 24 | AM | (Denmark) | Toutouh | 20 | EU | Esbjerg fB | End of loan | Winter | 2014 | n/a | |
| 12 | CM | (Denmark) | Jensen | 33 | EU | | Transfer | Winter | 2013 | Free | FCK.dk |

==== Out ====
| No. | Pos. | Nat. | Name | Age | EU | Moving to | Type | Transfer window | Transfer fee | Source |
|---|---|---|---|---|---|---|---|---|---|---|
| 9 | CF | (Denmark) | Nordstrand | 29 | EU | Nordsjælland | Contract ended | Summer | Free | FCN.dk |
| 25 | CB | (Denmark) | Zanka | 22 | EU | PSV (Netherlands) | Contract ended | Summer | n/a | PSV.nl |
| 14 | SS | (Senegal) | N'Doye | 27 | Non-EU | Lokomotiv Moscow (Russia) | Transfer | Summer | DKK 52,000,000 | FCLM.ru |
| 13 | LW | (Senegal) | Diouf | 26 | Non-EU | Molde (Norway) | Loan | Summer | n/a | MoldeFK.no |
| 26 | RB | (Costa Rica) | Gamboa | 22 | Non-EU | Rosenborg (Norway) | Loan | Summer | n/a | RBK.no |
| 19 | LB | (Costa Rica) | Oviedo | 22 | Non-EU | Everton (England) | Transfer | Summer | DKK 33,500,000 | EvertonFC.com |
| 12 | CB | (Sweden) | Larsson | 28 | EU | Helsingborgs IF (Sweden) | Transfer | Summer | Undisclosed | HIF.se |
| 22 | LW | (Denmark) | Absalonsen | 26 | EU | SønderjyskE | Transfer | Summer | DKK 250,000 | SonderjyskE.dk |
| 28 | CM | (Denmark) | Bergvold | 28 | EU | Esbjerg fB | Transfer | Summer | Undisclosed | EfB.dk |
| 24 | AM | (Denmark) | Toutouh | 19 | EU | Esbjerg fB | Loan | Summer | n/a | EfB.dk |
| 26 | RB | (Costa Rica) | Gamboa | 23 | Non-EU | Rosenborg (Norway) | Transfer | Winter | Undisclosed | RBK.no |
| 24 | AM | (Denmark) | Toutouh | 20 | EU | Esbjerg fB | Loan | Winter | n/a | EfB.dk |
| 23 | LW | (Denmark) | Frederiksen | 23 | EU | AaB | Transfer | Winter | Undisclosed | AaBSport.dk |
| 8 | CM | (Norway) | Grindheim | 29 | EU | Vålerenga (Norway) | Loan | Winter | n/a | VIF-Fotball.no |
| 7 | CF | (Norway) | Abdellaoue | 24 | EU | Vålerenga (Norway) | Loan | Winter | n/a | VIF-Fotball.no |

Last updated: 8 March

== Club ==
=== Coaching staff ===
| Position | Staff |
|---|---|
| Head coach | (Belgium) Ariël Jacobs |
| Assistant coach | (Denmark) Brian Riemer |
| Goalkeeping coach | (Denmark) Per Wind |
| Fitness coach | (Denmark) Anders Storskov |

Last updated: 30 July
Source: F.C. Copenhagen

=== Kit ===
Supplier: adidas
Sponsor(s): Carlsberg

| Home; Domestic | Away; Domestic | Home; Europe | Away; Europe | Third kit |

Source: FCKMegastore.dk

=== Other information ===
| Chairman | (Denmark) Hans Munk Nielsen |
| Sport director | (Denmark) Carsten V. Jensen |
| Ground (capacity and dimensions) | Parken (38,065 / 105x68 m) |

Updated to match played 10 June
Source: F.C. Copenhagen and Parken Stadium

== Competitions ==
=== Overall ===
| Competition | Started round | Current position / round | Final position / round | First match | Last match |
|---|---|---|---|---|---|
| Danish Superliga | — | — | 1st | 15 July | 20 May |
| Champions League | Third qualifying round | — | play-off round | 1 August | 29 August |
| UEFA Europa League | Group stage | — | Group stage | 20 September | 6 December |
| Danish Cup | Third round | — | Fifth round | 26 September | 28 November |

Updated to match played 20 May
Source: Competitions

=== Danish Superliga ===
==== Classification ====
| Pos | Team | Pld | W | D | L | GF | GA | GD | Pts | Qualification or relegation |
|---|---|---|---|---|---|---|---|---|---|---|
| 1 | Copenhagen (C) | 33 | 18 | 11 | 4 | 62 | 32 | +30 | 65 | Qualification for the Champions League group stage |
| 2 | Nordsjælland | 33 | 17 | 9 | 7 | 60 | 37 | +23 | 60 | Qualification for the Champions League third qualifying round |
| 3 | Randers FC | 33 | 15 | 7 | 11 | 36 | 42 | −6 | 52 | Qualification for the Europa League third qualifying round |
| 4 | Esbjerg fB | 33 | 13 | 8 | 12 | 38 | 32 | +6 | 47 | Qualification for the Europa League play-off round |
| 5 | AaB | 33 | 13 | 8 | 12 | 51 | 46 | +5 | 47 | Qualification for the Europa League second qualifying round |

Source: Danish Football Association (in Danish)
Rules for classification: 1) points; 2) goal difference; 3) number of goals scored.
(C) Champions

==== Results summary ====
| Overall | | | | | | | | Home | | | | | | Away | | | | | |
| Pld | W | D | L | GF | GA | GD | Pts | W | D | L | GF | GA | GD | W | D | L | GF | GA | GD |
|---|---|---|---|---|---|---|---|---|---|---|---|---|---|---|---|---|---|---|---|
| 33 | 18 | 11 | 4 | 62 | 32 | +30 | 65 | 13 | 4 | 1 | 41 | 14 | +27 | 5 | 7 | 3 | 21 | 18 | +3 |

Last updated: 20 May.

==== Results by round ====
| Round | 1 | 2 | 3 | 4 | 5 | 6 | 7 | 8 | 9 | 10 | 11 | 12 | 13 | 14 | 15 | 16 | 17 | 18 | 19 | 20 | 21 | 22 | 23 | 24 | 25 | 26 | 27 | 28 | 29 | 30 | 31 | 32 | 33 |
|---|---|---|---|---|---|---|---|---|---|---|---|---|---|---|---|---|---|---|---|---|---|---|---|---|---|---|---|---|---|---|---|---|---|
| Ground | H | A | H | A | H | H | A | A | H | H | A | A | H | A | A | H | H | A | H | H | A | H | H | A | A | H | A | A | H | A | H | A | H |
| Result | W | D | W | W | W | D | W | D | W | W | D | D | W | L | W | W | W | W | W | W | W | W | W | D | L | D | W | D | D | D | L | L | D |

Updated to match(es) played on 20 May. Source: Competitive Matches
A = Away; H = Home; W = Win; D = Draw; L = Loss

=== UEFA Champions League ===
==== Third qualifying round ====
| Team 1 | Agg. | Team 2 | 1st leg | 2nd leg |
|---|---|---|---|---|
| Copenhagen (Denmark) | 3–2 | (Belgium) Club Brugge | 0–0 | 3–2 |

Last updated: 8 August.
Source: UEFA Champions League

==== Play-off round ====
| Team 1 | Agg. | Team 2 | 1st leg | 2nd leg |
|---|---|---|---|---|
| Copenhagen (Denmark) | 1–2 | (France) Lille | 1–0 | 0–2 (aet) |

Last updated: 29 August.
Source: UEFA Champions League

==== Results summary ====
| Overall | | | | | | | | Home | | | | | | Away | | | | | |
| Pld | W | D | L | GF | GA | GD | Pts | W | D | L | GF | GA | GD | W | D | L | GF | GA | GD |
|---|---|---|---|---|---|---|---|---|---|---|---|---|---|---|---|---|---|---|---|
| 4 | 2 | 1 | 1 | 4 | 4 | 0 | 7 | 1 | 1 | 0 | 1 | 0 | +1 | 1 | 0 | 1 | 3 | 4 | −1 |

Last updated: 29 August.

=== UEFA Europa League ===
==== Group E ====
===== Classification =====
| Pos | Team | Pld | W | D | L | GF | GA | GD | Pts | Qualification | STE | STU | COP | MOL |
|---|---|---|---|---|---|---|---|---|---|---|---|---|---|---|
| 1 | (Romania) Steaua București | 6 | 3 | 2 | 1 | 9 | 9 | 0 | 11 | Advance to knockout phase | — | 1–5 | 1–0 | 2–0 |
| 2 | (Germany) VfB Stuttgart | 6 | 2 | 2 | 2 | 9 | 6 | +3 | 8 (Note: Head-to-head points: VfB Stuttgart 4, Copenhagen 1.) | Advance to knockout phase | 2–2 | — | 0–0 | 0–1 |
| 3 | (Denmark) Copenhagen | 6 | 2 | 2 | 2 | 5 | 6 | −1 | 8 | | 1–1 | 0–2 | — | 2–1 |
| 4 | (Norway) Molde | 6 | 2 | 0 | 4 | 6 | 8 | −2 | 6 | | 1–2 | 2–0 | 1–2 | — |

Source: Soccerway

===== Results by round =====
| Round | 1 | 2 | 3 | 4 | 5 | 6 |
|---|---|---|---|---|---|---|
| Ground | H | A | A | H | A | H |
| Result | W | L | D | L | W | D |

Updated to match(es) played on 6 December. Source: UEFA Europa League
A = Away; H = Home; W = Win; D = Draw; L = Loss

==== Results summary ====
| Overall | | | | | | | | Home | | | | | | Away | | | | | |
| Pld | W | D | L | GF | GA | GD | Pts | W | D | L | GF | GA | GD | W | D | L | GF | GA | GD |
|---|---|---|---|---|---|---|---|---|---|---|---|---|---|---|---|---|---|---|---|
| 6 | 2 | 2 | 2 | 5 | 6 | −1 | 8 | 1 | 1 | 1 | 3 | 4 | −1 | 1 | 1 | 1 | 2 | 2 | 0 |

Last updated: 6 December.

== Matches ==
=== Competitive ===
| Game | Date | Tournament | Round | Ground | Opponent | Score^{1} | TV | Report |
|---|---|---|---|---|---|---|---|---|
| 1 | 15 July | Danish Superliga | 1 | H | Midtjylland | 4–2 | TV3+ | Report / Report link; Kick off / 19:00 CEST; Attendance / 10,806; Referee / Jakob Kehlet; Copenhagen / Midtjylland; Ottesen (yellow card) 3'; Vingaard (yellow card) 23'; Claudemir (red card) 71'; Santin 75'; Cornelius 78'; Oviedo 86'; Santin 90' / Igboun 9'; Janssen 54'; Sviatchenko (yellow card) 55'; Janssen (yellow card) 71'; Sviatchenko (yellow card) 81' (yellow-red card); Uzochukwo (yellow card) 90' |
| 2 | 22 July | Danish Superliga | 2 | A | SønderjyskE | 1–1 | Canal 9 | Report / Report link; Kick off / 17:00 CEST; Attendance / 6,575; Referee / Michael Tykgaard; Copenhagen / SønderjyskE; Abdellaoue 31'; Sigurðsson (yellow card) 41'; Ottesen (yellow card) 87' / Héðinsson 25'; Hansen (yellow card) 44'; O'Brien (yellow card) 68' |
| 3 | 28 July | Danish Superliga | 3 | H | AaB | 3–0 | Canal 9 | Report / Report link; Kick off / 15:00 CEST; Attendance / 9,571; Referee / Henrik Nystrup Kragh; Copenhagen / AaB; Cornelius 40'; Santin 60'; Abdellaoue 90' / Petersen (yellow card) 52' |
| 4 | 1 August | Champions League | Third qualifying round | H | Club Brugge (Belgium) | 0–0 | TV3+ | Report / Report link; Kick off / 20:00 CEST; Attendance / 14,023; Referee / Ovidiu Alin Hategan; Copenhagen / Club Brugge; Sigurðsson (yellow card) 80'; Vingaard (yellow card) 87' / Hoefkens (yellow card) 22'; Meunier (yellow card) 78'; Blondel (yellow card) 90' |
| 5 | 4 August | Danish Superliga | 4 | A | Esbjerg fB | 2–1 | Canal 9 | Report / Report link; Kick off / 19:00 CEST; Attendance / 6,507; Referee / Peter Rasmussen; Copenhagen / Esbjerg fB; Claudemir (yellow card) 12'; Vingaard 33'; Cornelius 61' / Ankersen 65'; Hansen (yellow card) 81' |
| 6 | 8 August | Champions League | Third qualifying round | A (Belgium) | Club Brugge (Belgium) | 3–2 | TV3+ | Report / Report link; Kick off / 20:30 CEST; Referee / Michail Koukoulakis; Copenhagen / Club Brugge; Oviedo (yellow card) 8'; Jacobsen (yellow card) 57'; Jørgensen 61'; Claudemir (yellow card) 64'; Bolaños 78'; Santin 90' / Jacobsen 24' (o.g.); Meunier (yellow card) 25'; Larsen (yellow card) 56'; Odjidja-Ofoe 66' |
| 7 | 12 August | Danish Superliga | 5 | H | AGF | 3–0 | TV3+ | Report / Report link; Kick off / 19:00 CEST; Attendance / 11,196; Referee / Michael Johansen; Copenhagen / AGF; Santin 56'; Cornelius 63'; Santin 80' (pen.) / Kirkeskov (yellow card) 64' |
| 8 | 18 August | Danish Superliga | 6 | H | Brøndby | 1–1 | TV3+ | Report / Report link; Kick off / 19:00 CEST; Attendance / 16,489; Referee / Kenn Hansen; Copenhagen / Brøndby; Vingaard (yellow card) 50'; Jørgensen (yellow card) 52'; Jørgensen 53'; Oviedo (yellow card) 88' / Akpoveta (yellow card) 57'; Jensen (yellow card) 63'; Goodson 88' |
| 9 | 21 August | Champions League | play-off round | H | Lille (France) | 1–0 | TV3+ | Report / Report link; Kick off / 20:45 CEST; Attendance / 15,654; Referee / Strahonja; Copenhagen / Lille; Santin 38' / Rozehnal (yellow card) 68'; Roux (yellow card) 76' |
| 10 | 25 August | Danish Superliga | 7 | A | Randers FC | 3–2 | TV 2 Sport | Report / Report link; Kick off / 17:00 CEST; Attendance / 6,112; Referee / Michael Svendsen; Copenhagen / Randers FC; Delaney (yellow card) 40'; Jørgensen 58'; Jakobsen (yellow card) 60'; Vingaard (yellow card) 64'; Cornelius 90'; Ottesen 90' / Fischer (yellow card) 34'; Schwartz 38'; Schwartz 61' (pen.); Kamper (yellow card) 62' |
| 11 | 29 August | Champions League | play-off round | A (France) | Lille (France) | 0–2 | TV3+ | Report / Report link; Kick off / 20:45 CEST; Referee / Pavel Kralovec; Copenhagen / Lille; Kristensen (yellow card) 28'; Oviedo (yellow card) 34'; Claudemir 40'; Stadsgaard (yellow card) 42'; Vetokele (yellow card) 120' / Digne 43'; Roux (yellow card) 96'; Béria (yellow card) 99' de Melo 105' |
| 12 | 2 September | Danish Superliga | 8 | A | OB | 2–2 | TV3+ | Report / Report link; Kick off / 19:00 CEST; Attendance / 9,439; Referee / Michael Tykgaard; Copenhagen / OB; Cornelius 6'; Jørgensen 64' / Johansson 50'; Gíslason 67' |
| 13 | 15 September | Danish Superliga | 9 | H | Nordsjælland | 2–1 | Canal 9 | Report / Report link; Kick off / 19:00 CEST; Attendance / 17,838; Referee / Kenn Hansen; Copenhagen / Nordsjælland; Vetokele 72'; Delaney (yellow card) 73'; Kristensen (yellow card) 75'; Cornelius 78'; Bengtsson 88' / Parkhurst 45'; Adu (yellow card) 59'; Okore (yellow card) 67'; Christiansen (yellow card) 88'; Stokholm (yellow card) 90'; Mtiliga (yellow card) 90' |
| 14 | 20 September | UEFA Europa League | Group stage | H | Molde (Norway) | 2–1 | Canal 9 | Report / Report link; Kick off / 19:00 CEST; Attendance / 11,633; Referee / Antti Munukka; Copenhagen / Molde; Claudemir 20'; Vingaard (yellow card) 61'; Cornelius 74' / Diouf 45'; Moström (yellow card) 58' |
| 15 | 23 September | Danish Superliga | 10 | H | Silkeborg IF | 5–0 | TV3+ | Report / Report link; Kick off / 19:00 CEST; Attendance / 10,757; Referee / Peter Rasmussen; Copenhagen / Silkeborg IF; Cornelius 12'; Cornelius 18'; Jørgensen 19'; Jacobsen (yellow card) 29'; Jørgensen 33'; Vingaard 75' / Bech (yellow card) 33' |
| 16 | 26 September | Danish Cup | Third round | A | Fredericia (Denmark) | 3–0 | TV3+ | Report / Report link; Kick off / 19:00 CEST; Attendance / 2,795; Referee / Mads-Kristoffer Kristoffersen; Copenhagen / Horsens; Bolaños 26'; Jørgensen (yellow card) 41'; Kristensen 45'; Kristensen 50' |
| 17 | 29 September | Danish Superliga | 11 | A | Horsens | 1–1 | TV 2 Sport | Report / Report link; Kick off / 17:00 CEST; Attendance / 4,621; Referee / Henning Jensen; Copenhagen / Horsens; Claudemir (yellow card) 11'; Cornelius 28'; Jørgensen (yellow card) 85' / Juel Andersen (yellow card) 17'; Nworuh 33' |
| 18 | 4 October | UEFA Europa League | Group stage | AR (Romania) | Steaua București (Romania) | 0–1 | Canal 9 | Report / Report link; Kick off / 22:05 EEST; Referee / Luca Banti; Copenhagen / Steaua București; Delaney (yellow card) 27'; Wiland (yellow card) 73' / Popa (yellow card) 51'; Sigurðsson 83' (o.g.) |
| 19 | 7 October | Danish Superliga | 12 | A | Esbjerg fB | 2–2 | Canal 9 | Report / Report link; Kick off / 17:00 CEST; Attendance / 9,337; Referee / Claus Bo Larsen; Copenhagen / Esbjerg fB; Santin 55'; Jørgensen 58'; Kristensen (yellow card) 71'; Delaney (yellow card) 90' / Ankersen 35'; Høgh (yellow card) 53'; Ankersen 87'; Lange (yellow card) 90' |
| 20 | 21 October | Danish Superliga | 13 | H | Brøndby | 1–0 | TV3+ | Report / Report link; Kick off / 19:00 CEST; Attendance / 32,341; Referee / Jakob Kehlet; Copenhagen / Brøndby; Stadsgaard 12'; Delaney (yellow card) 90' / Antipas (yellow card) 83' |
| 21 | 25 October | UEFA Europa League | Group stage | A (Germany) | VfB Stuttgart (Germany) | 0–0 | Canal 9 | Report / Report link; Kick off / 21:05 CEST; Attendance / 15,300; Referee / Artur Soares; Copenhagen / VfB Stuttgart; Delaney (yellow card) 16'; Bolaños (yellow card) 82' / Ibišević (yellow card) 48' |
| 22 | 29 October | Danish Superliga | 14 | A | Horsens | 0–1 | TV 2 Sport | Report / Report link; Kick off / 19:00 CET; Attendance / 3,547; Referee / Peter Rasmussen; Copenhagen / Horsens; / Kielstrup 33'; Agesen (yellow card) 87'; Agesen (yellow card) 90' (yellow-red card); Kryger (yellow card) 90' |
| 23 | 1 November | Danish Cup | Fourth round | A | SønderjyskE | 3–0 | TV3+ | Report / Report link; Kick off / 18:00 CET; Attendance / 1,499; Referee / Claus Bo Larsen; Copenhagen / AGF; Amankwaa 36'; Gíslason (yellow card) 42'; Santin 52'; Cornelius 86' / O'Brien (yellow card) 29'; Christensen (yellow card) 56'; Swerts (yellow card) 58' |
| 24 | 4 November | Danish Superliga | 15 | A | AGF | 2–0 | TV3+ | Report / Report link; Kick off / 19:00 CET; Attendance / 14,676; Referee / Michael Svendsen; Copenhagen / AGF; Bolaños 40'; Stadsgaard 45'; Delaney (yellow card) 52' / Petersen (yellow card) 26'; Kirkeskov (yellow card) 56' |
| 25 | 8 November | UEFA Europa League | Group stage | H | VfB Stuttgart (Germany) | 0–2 | Canal 9 | Report / Report link; Kick off / 19:00 CET; Attendance / 24,681; Referee / Craig Thomson; Copenhagen / VfB Stuttgart; Cornelius (yellow card) 29' / Niedermeier (yellow card) 29'; Molinaro (yellow card) 32'; Ibišević 76'; Harnik 90' |
| 26 | 11 November | Danish Superliga | 16 | H | AaB | 4–0 | TV3+ | Report / Report link; Kick off / 19:00 CET; Attendance / 12,493; Referee / Lars Christoffersen; Copenhagen / AaB; Jakobsen (yellow card) 2'; Jørgensen 7'; Jørgensen 12'; Delaney (yellow card) 14'; Petersen 24' (o.g.); Santin 42' (pen.) / Kristensen (yellow card) 41' |
| 27 | 18 November | Danish Superliga | 17 | H | Midtjylland | 2–1 | TV3+ | Report / Report link; Kick off / 19:00 CET; Attendance / 12,016; Referee / Michael Tykgaard; Copenhagen / Midtjylland; Sigurðsson 4'; Jørgensen 24'; Amankwaa (yellow card) 76' / Andersson (yellow card) 17'; Albæk (yellow card) 44'; Albæk 62'; Ipša (yellow card) 75' |
| 28 | 8 November | UEFA Europa League | Group stage | A (Norway) | Molde (Norway) | 2–1 | Canal 9 | Report / Report link; Kick off / 21:05 CET; Attendance / 5,740; Referee / Michael Oliver; Copenhagen / Molde; Santin 21' (pen.); Gíslason 76' / Gatt (yellow card) 41'; Hussain (yellow card) 52'; Chima 62' |
| 29 | 25 November | Danish Superliga | 18 | A | SønderjyskE | 2–1 | Canal 9 | Report / Report link; Kick off / 17:00 CET; Attendance / 1,903; Referee / Kenn Hansen; Copenhagen / SønderjyskE; Cornelius 48'; Gíslason (yellow card) 75'; Cornelius 78' / Héðinsson 31'; Swerts (yellow card) 38'; Hansen (yellow card) 58'; Bødker (yellow card) 64' |
| 30 | 28 November | Danish Cup | Fifth round | A | Brøndby | 0–1 | TV3+ | Report / Report link; Kick off / 20:30 CET; Attendance / 13,652; Referee / Kenn Hansen; Copenhagen / Brøndby; Santin (yellow card) 61'; Jacobsen (yellow card) 95' / Albrechtsen (yellow card) 73'; Jensen 91'; Holst (yellow card) 93'; McGrath (yellow card) 120' |
| 31 | 2 December | Danish Superliga | 19 | H | Randers FC | 2–0 | Canal 9 | Report / Report link; Kick off / 17:00 CET; Attendance / 10,191; Referee / Claus Bo Larsen; Copenhagen / Randers FC; Cornelius 12'; Sigurðsson 25' / Schwartz (yellow card) 54'; Keller (yellow card) 55' |
| 32 | 6 December | UEFA Europa League | Group stage | H | Steaua București (Romania) | 1–1 | Canal 9 | Report / Report link; Kick off / 19:00 CET; Attendance / 15,487; Referee / Hüseyin Göçek (Turkey); Copenhagen / Steaua București; Vetokele 87' / Tănase (yellow card) 32'; Tănase (yellow card) 49' (yellow-red card); Chiricheș (yellow card) 51'; Rusescu 73'; Bourceanu (yellow card) 78'; Latovlevici (yellow card) 81' |
| 33 | 9 December | Danish Superliga | 20 | H | Nordsjælland | 4–1 | TV3+ | Report / Report link; Kick off / 19:00 CET; Attendance / 15,934; Referee / Michael Johansen; Copenhagen / Nordsjælland; Santin (yellow card) 15'; Delaney 24'; Santin 38'; Santin 52'; Kristensen (yellow card) 65'; Cornelius 90' / Beckmann (yellow card) 10'; Tičinović (yellow card) 35'; Christiansen (yellow card) 65'; Beckmann 76' (pen.) |
| 34 | 3 March | Danish Superliga | 21 | A | OB | 3–2 | TV3+ | Report / Report link; Kick off / 19:00 CET; Attendance / 10,314; Referee / Jakob Kehlet; Copenhagen / OB; Høegh 11' (o.g.); Jensen (yellow card) 16'; Jørgensen 54'; Stadsgaard (yellow card) 56'; Claudemir 70' / Kadrii (yellow card) 14'; E. Larsen 27'; K. Larsen (yellow card) 30'; Bodul 34'; Silberbauer (yellow card) 36'; Christensen (yellow card) 83' |
| 35 | 10 March | Danish Superliga | 22 | H | Silkeborg IF | 3–1 | Canal 9 | Report / Report link; Kick off / 17:00 CET; Attendance / 12,296; Referee / Michael Johansen; Copenhagen / Silkeborg IF; Jørgensen 28'; Cornelius 39'; Sigurðsson (yellow card) 41'; Jensen (yellow card) 56'; Cornelius 76' / Kiilerich (yellow card) 22'; Mikkelsen 80'; Flinta (yellow card) 89' |
| 36 | 15 March | Danish Superliga | 23 | H | Horsens | 2–1 | TV3 Sport 1 | Report / Report link; Kick off / 18:30 CET; Attendance / 8,542; Referee / Mads-Kristoffer Kristoffersen; Copenhagen / Horsens; Santin 29'; Bengtsson (yellow card) 64'; Claudemir 90' / Takyi 17'; Kielstrup (yellow card) 57'; Retov (yellow card) 58'; Agesen (yellow card) 73' |
| 37 | 29 March | Danish Superliga | 24 | A | Midtjylland | 2–2 | TV3+ | Report / Report link; Kick off / 19:00 CET; Attendance / 8,091; Referee / Kenn Hansen; Copenhagen / Midtjylland; Stadsgaard (yellow card) 59'; Jørgensen (yellow card) 69'; Santin 76'; Cornelius 90' / Andersson 37'; Andersson 72' |
| 38 | 1 April | Danish Superliga | 25 | A | Silkeborg IF | 0–1 | Canal 9 | Report / Report link; Kick off / 17:00 CEST; Attendance / 3,648; Referee / Anders Poulsen; Copenhagen / Silkeborg IF; Jørgensen (yellow card) 26' / Pourié 79'; Risgård (yellow card) 87' |
| 39 | 7 April | Danish Superliga | 26 | H | OB | 1–1 | TV3+ | Report / Report link; Kick off / 19:00 CEST; Attendance / 17,327; Referee / Michael Johansen; Copenhagen / OB; Bengtsson 50'; Cornelius (yellow card) 90' / Ruud 38'; Schoop (yellow card) 54' |
| 40 | 15 April | Danish Superliga | 27 | A | Nordsjælland | 3–2 | TV3 Sport 1 | Report / Report link; Kick off / 19:00 CEST; Attendance / 10,300; Referee / Jakob Kehlet; Copenhagen / Nordsjælland; Sigurðsson 5'; Stadsgaard (yellow card) 9'; Kristensen (yellow card) 9'; Vetokele 66'; Cornelius 78' / Mtiliga 7'; Nordstrand 26'; Stokholm (yellow card) 31'; Mtiliga (yellow card) 85'; Nordstrand (yellow card) 90' |
| 41 | 21 April | Danish Superliga | 28 | A | AaB | 1–1 | TV3+ | Report / Report link; Kick off / 19:00 CEST; Attendance / 10,564; Referee / Michael Johansen; Copenhagen / AaB; Bolaños 48'; Jørgensen (yellow card) 89' / Helenius 41' (pen.) |
| 42 | 28 April | Danish Superliga | 29 | H | AGF | 0–0 | TV3+ | Report / Report link; Kick off / 19:00 CEST; Attendance / 20,670; Referee / Michael Tykgaard; Copenhagen / AGF; Claudemir (yellow card) 26'; Cornelius (yellow card) 90' / Kirkeskov (yellow card) 13'; Skhirtladze (yellow card) 90' |
| 43 | 5 May | Danish Superliga | 30 | A | Brøndby | 0–0 | TV3+ | Report / Report link; Kick off / 19:00 CEST; Attendance / 21,031; Referee / Kenn Hansen; Copenhagen / Brøndby; Jørgensen (yellow card) 34'; Delaney (yellow card) 38' / Phiri (yellow card) 34'; Antipas (yellow card) 34' da Silva (yellow card) 52' |
| 44 | 12 May | Danish Superliga | 31 | H | Esbjerg fB | 0–2 | TV3+ | Report / Report link; Kick off / 19:00 CEST; Attendance / 19,061; Referee / Peter Rasmussen; Copenhagen / Esbjerg fB; Jørgensen (yellow card) 61'; Jensen (yellow card) 85' / Ankersen 20'; Braithwaite 57' |
| 45 | 16 May | Danish Superliga | 32 | A | Randers FC | 0–1 | TV3 Puls | Report / Report link; Kick off / 19:00 CEST; Attendance / 5,177; Referee / Henning Jensen; Copenhagen / Randers FC; Jakobsen (yellow card) 32'; Ottesen (yellow card) 60'; Cornelius (yellow card) 73' / Boya 89' |
| 46 | 20 May | Danish Superliga | 33 | H | SønderjyskE | 1–1 | Canal 9 | Report / Report link; Kick off / 17:00 CEST; Attendance / 33,215; Referee / Claus Bo Larsen; Copenhagen / SønderjyskE; Vetokele 37'; Claudemir (yellow card) 60'; Claudemir (yellow card) 65' (yellow-red card) / Lodberg 52' |

Last updated: 20 May
Source: FCK.dk
^{1}F.C. Copenhagen goals come first.
National flags for Ground and Opponent columns are only shown when different from that of F.C. Copenhagen.
M = Match; Ground: H = Home, A = Away, N = Neutral, HR = Home replacement, AR = Away replacement.
