= Andreas Cornelius =

Danish footballer (born 1993)

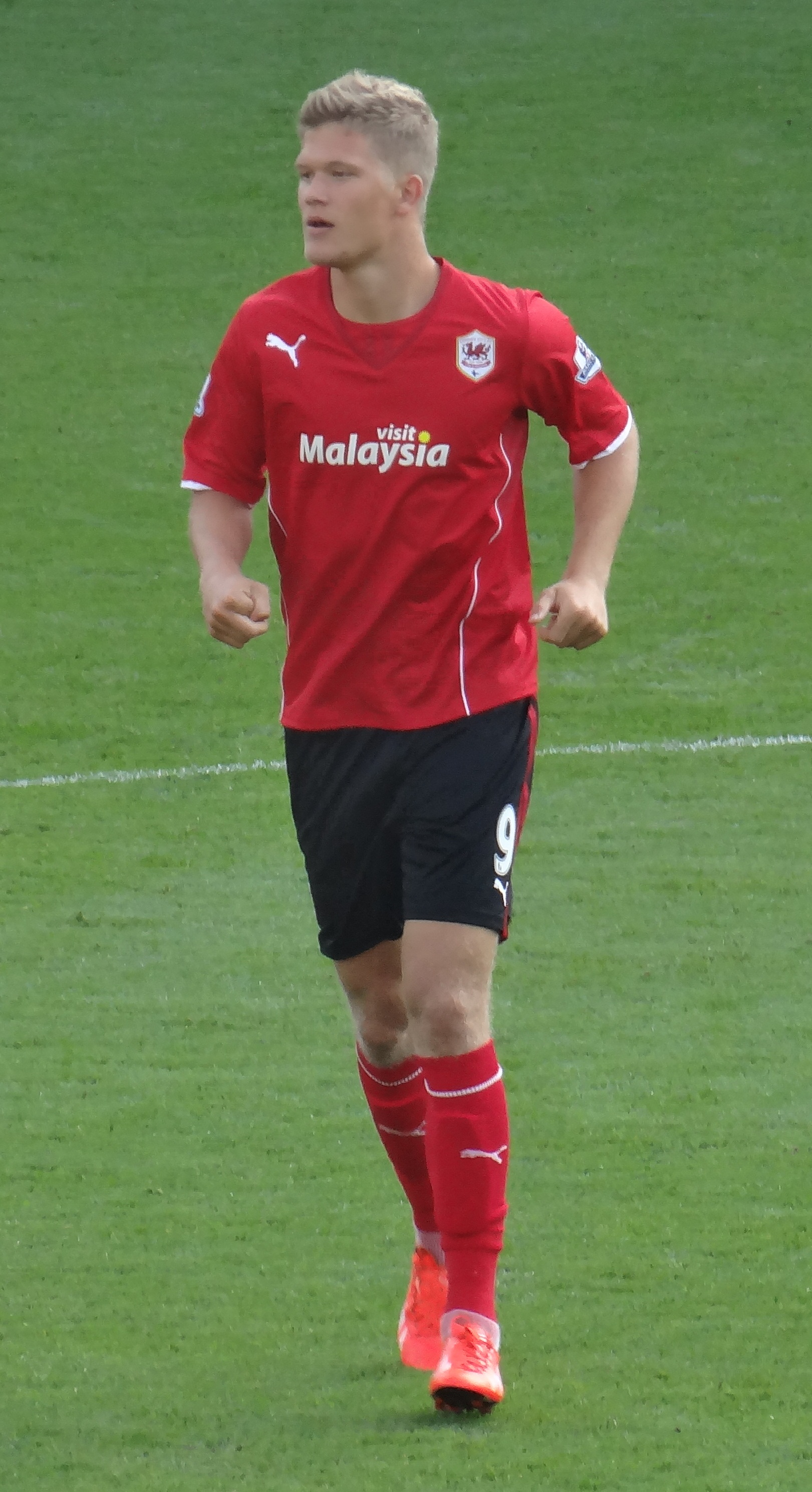
- Cornelius with Cardiff City in 2013

Personal information
- Full name: Andreas Evald Cornelius
- Date of birth: 16 March 1993 (age 33)
- Place of birth: Copenhagen, Denmark
- Height: 1.93 m (6 ft 4 in)
- Position: Striker

Team information
- Current team: Copenhagen
- Number: 14

Youth career
- BK Hekla
- Fremad Amager
- Copenhagen

Senior career*
Years	Team	Apps	(Gls)
2012–2013	Copenhagen	34	(18)
2013–2014	Cardiff City	8	(0)
2014–2017	Copenhagen	91	(28)
2017–2021	Atalanta	23	(3)
2018–2019	→ Bordeaux (loan)	20	(3)
2019–2021	→ Parma (loan)	55	(13)
2021	Parma	0	(0)
2021–2022	Trabzonspor	41	(16)
2022–	Copenhagen	72	(9)

International career
2010–2011	Denmark U18	6	(2)
2011–2012	Denmark U19	14	(4)
2012–2015	Denmark U21	7	(2)
2013	Denmark League XI	2	(4)
2012–2022	Denmark	44	(9)
- * Club domestic league appearances and goals as of 26 October 2026

Andreas Evald Cornelius (born 16 March 1993) is a Danish professional footballer who plays as a striker for Copenhagen.

== Club career ==
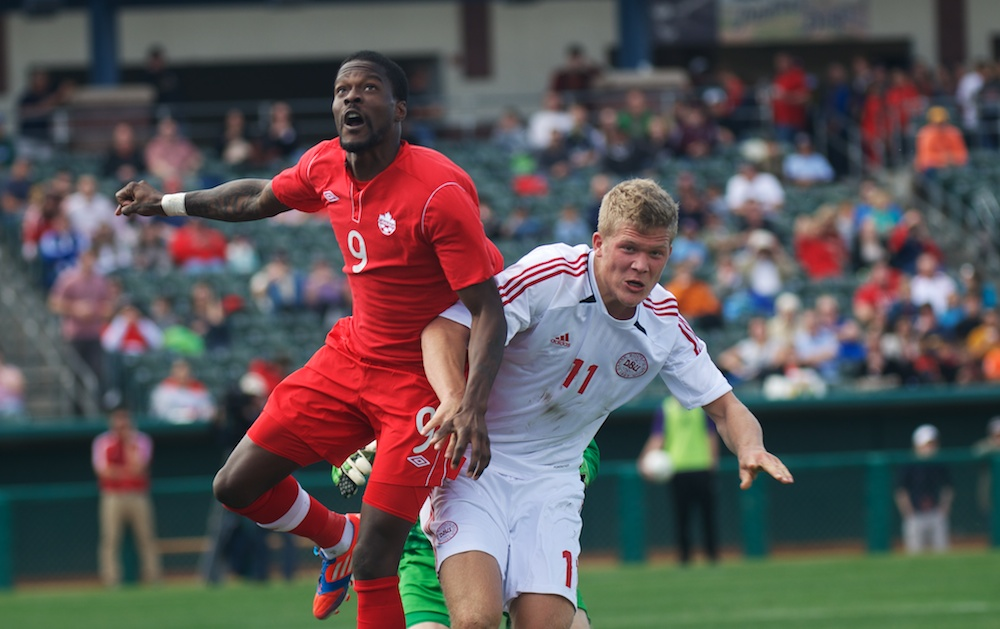
Cornelius vs. Tosaint Ricketts of Canada in 2013.

=== F.C. Copenhagen ===
Cornelius had joined the FC Copenhagen first team squad for its training camps in July 2011 and January 2012.

On 9 April 2012, he played his first Superliga match, coming on as a substitute for César Santin against AGF at NRGi Park in Aarhus. In the previous Superliga match (against Brøndby at Parken Stadium on 5 April 2012), he had been an unused substitute. On 20 May 2012, it was announced that Cornelius would join the first team squad on a permanent basis at the beginning of the upcoming season, together with Christoffer Remmer and Jakob Busk.

Cornelius scored his first goal for Copenhagen against Midtjylland in the first game of the new 2012–13 season. He scored the opening goal against Odense in a 2–2 draw. He also scored the winning goal against Molde FK in the Europa League on 20 September.

Cornelius was awarded player of the month in the Danish Superliga on 7 October 2012. On 15 April, he scored the final goal in a 3–2 win against FC Nordsjælland. This gave FCK a 10-point lead in the league to number 2, and was crucial for Copenhagen winning the title.

Even though Cornelius only played one full season with the first team, he quickly became one of the most popular players of the club, as the print with his name and number on the official shirts being the most popular, selling around 40% of all prints.

=== Cardiff City ===
On 27 June 2013, Cardiff City announced they had signed Cornelius, for a club record fee. Reports from Denmark suggested a fee of 75 million Danish kroner (approximately £8 million). On 1 July, Cornelius completed his medical and signed a five-year deal with the club, saying "I've been given a great opportunity and this is a very exciting project that's taking place at Cardiff City." Twenty-three days later, he made his debut in a friendly against Forest Green Rovers and scored a goal in a 4–3 victory. However, he sustained a minor injury to his ankle during training the following week, and consequently missed out on the team's first ever Premier League game, against West Ham United on 17 August.

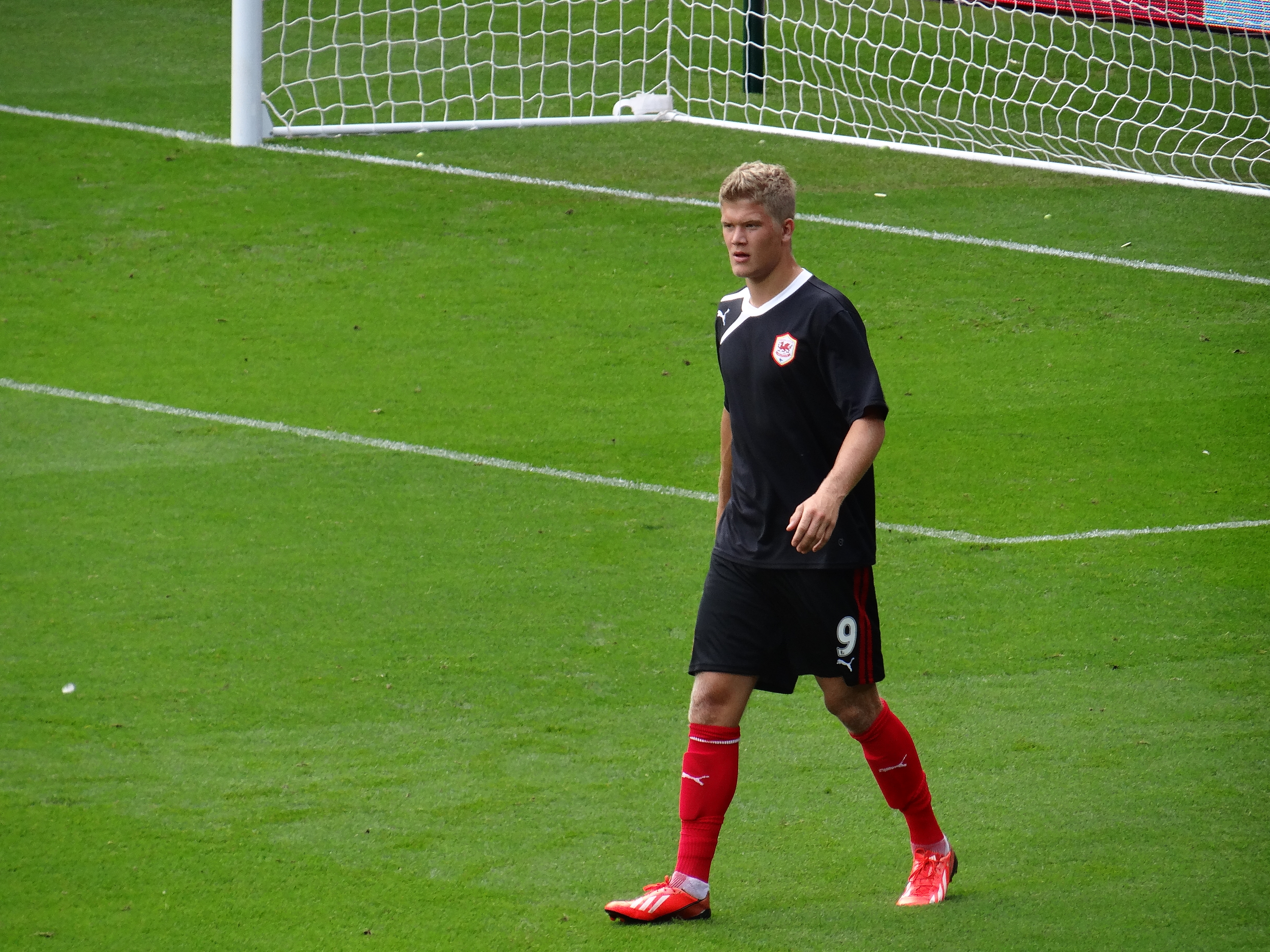
Cornelius warming up before his Premier League debut on 25 August 2013

Cornelius made his competitive debut for Cardiff on 25 August against Manchester City, coming on as a stoppage-time replacement for Fraizer Campbell who had scored twice in the 3–2 home victory. Three days later, in a League Cup match against League Two club Accrington Stanley, he made his first competitive start for the club in a 2–0 win; however he re-aggravated the ankle injury he had picked up in pre-season following a heavy tackle and was carried off on a stretcher just before half-time. The injury would prove worse than first feared; and left Cornelius on the sidelines for the next three months, meaning he missed 10 games for Cardiff, as well as the chance to compete for his country Denmark in their final qualification games for the 2014 FIFA World Cup in Brazil.

During the final international break of 2013, Cornelius once again began training with the first team squad, in order to be accessed by the medical staff. They deemed that he was fit to return to action, and therefore arranged a behind closed door friendly with Championship club Yeovil Town on 14 November. He played 60 minutes as planned in a 2–1 defeat and told the media that he was fit and ready to return to action.

=== F.C. Copenhagen return ===
On 31 January 2014, Cornelius returned to F.C. Copenhagen for an undisclosed fee, but Cardiff claim they lost most of the money they paid for him. He scored a hat-trick in his first game back at Copenhagen in a friendly match against Slovan Liberec. On 23 February 2014, Cornelius made his first competitive start after re-signing with the club and crowned his comeback with a header to put his team 1–0 in front against AGF at NRGi Park. The match ended in a 1–1 draw.

Cornelius ended his first half season with 5 goals in 13 appearances, including a brace against Randers FC in Parken where he dribbled past four men before sending the ball into the back of the net. In April 2015, he suffered a "horrific" ankle injury during Copenhagen's match against Silkeborg IF.

=== Atalanta ===
On 2 May 2017, it was announced that Cornelius would join Serie A side Atalanta for a fee of around €3.5 million.

==== Bordeaux loan ====
On 31 August 2018, hours before the closing of the 2018 summer transfer window, Cornelius joined Ligue 1 side FC Girondins de Bordeaux on loan for the season. The deal reportedly included an option for Bordeaux to sign him permanently for a fee between €7 and 8 million.

=== Parma ===
On 18 July 2019, Cornelius signed to Serie A club Parma a 2-years loan with an obligation to buy. On 20 October 2019, Cornelius came off the bench in the 11th to substitute the injured Roberto Inglese, and scored a hat trick in a 5–1 home win against Genoa within a span of eight minutes. Cornelius scored a second hat-trick again against Genoa later on in the season in a 4–1 away win.

=== Trabzonspor ===
On 8 August 2021, Cornelius joined Süper Lig side Trabzonspor in a permanent deal. On 30 April 2022, Trabzonspor were crowned Turkish league champions for the first time in 38 years, clinching the title with a 2–2 draw against Antalyaspor.

=== Return to Copenhagen ===
On deadline day, 31 August 2022, Cornelius returned to his former club F.C. Copenhagen for the third time, signing a deal until June 2027. On 20 September 2026, Cornelius scored the winning goal in a 1–0 derby victory over Brøndby IF, his first goal in a Danish Superliga derby.

== International career ==
In May 2018 he was named in the Denmark national team’s preliminary 35-man squad for the 2018 World Cup in Russia. He played in three of Denmark's four games, starting in the final group match against France and the round of 16 match against Croatia. Cornelius did not score any goals in the World Cup.

In June 2021, he was included in the national team's bid for 2020 UEFA Euro, where the team reached the semi-finals.

On 7 November 2022, he was included in the final 26-man squad for the 2022 FIFA World Cup in Qatar.

== Career statistics ==
=== Club ===
As of match played 26 October 2026

Appearances and goals by club, season and competition
Club	Season	League			National cup (Note: Includes Danish Cup, FA Cup, Coppa Italia, Coupe de France, Turkish Cup)		League cup (Note: Includes Football League Cup, Coupe de la Ligue)		Europe		Other		Total	
Club	Season	Division	Apps	Goals	Apps	Goals	Apps	Goals	Apps	Goals	Apps	Goals	Apps	Goals
Copenhagen	2011–12	Danish Superliga	2	0	0	0	–		0	0	–		2	0
Copenhagen	2012–13	Danish Superliga	32	18	2	1	–		10 (Note: Four appearances in UEFA Champions League, six appearances and one goal in UEFA Europa League)	1	–		44	20
Copenhagen	Total		34	18	2	1	–		10	1	–		46	20
Cardiff City	2013–14	Premier League	8	0	2	0	1	0	–		–		11	0
Copenhagen	2013–14	Danish Superliga	13	5	3	1	–		0	0	–		16	6
Copenhagen	2014–15	Danish Superliga	23	6	3	1	–		8 (Note: Four appearances and one goal in UEFA Champions League, four appearances in UEFA Europa League)	1	–		34	8
Copenhagen	2015–16	Danish Superliga	25	5	6	1	–		0	0	–		31	6
Copenhagen	2016–17	Danish Superliga	30	12	4	2	–		15 (Note: Eleven appearances and six goals in UEFA Champions League, four appearances and one goal in UEFA Europa League)	7	–		49	21
Copenhagen	Total		91	28	16	5	–		23	8	–		130	41
Atalanta	2017–18	Serie A	23	3	4	1	–		4 (Note: Appearances in UEFA Europa League)	2	–		31	6
Atalanta	2018–19	Serie A	0	0	0	0	–		4	1	–		4	1
Atalanta	Total		23	3	4	1	–		8	3	–		35	7
Bordeaux (loan)	2018–19	Ligue 1	20	3	1	0	3	0	5	0	–		29	3
Parma (loan)	2019–20	Serie A	26	12	1	0	–		–		–		27	12
Parma (loan)	2020–21	Serie A	29	1	1	0	–		–		–		30	1
Parma (loan)	Total		55	13	2	0	–		–		–		57	13
Trabzonspor	2021–22	Süper Lig	37	15	3	1	–		2 (Note: Appearances in UEFA Europa Conference League)	1	–		42	17
Trabzonspor	2022–23	Süper Lig	4	1	0	0	–		2 (Note: Appearances in UEFA Champions League)	0	1 (Note: Appearance in Turkish Super Cup)	2	7	3
Trabzonspor	Total		41	16	3	1	–		4	1	1	2	49	20
Copenhagen	2022–23	Danish Superliga	11	0	1	2	–		2	0	–		14	2
Copenhagen	2023–24	Danish Superliga	17	2	3	0	–		4	0	–		24	2
Copenhagen	2024–25	Danish Superliga	18	3	6	0	–		6 (Note: Appearances in UEFA Conference League)	0	–		30	3
Copenhagen	2025–26	Danish Superliga	18	2	2	0	–		9	3	–		29	5
Copenhagen	2026–27	Danish Superliga	8	2	0	0	–		7	5	–		15	7
Copenhagen	Total		72	9	12	2	–		28	8	–		112	19
Career total			344	90	42	10	4	0	78	21	1	2	469	123

=== International ===
As of match played 30 November 2022

Appearances and goals by national team and year
National team	Year	Apps	Goals
Denmark	2012	2	0
Denmark	2013	5	1
Denmark	2014	1	0
Denmark	2015	0	0
Denmark	2016	3	2
Denmark	2017	6	1
Denmark	2018	6	0
Denmark	2019	2	0
Denmark	2020	2	1
Denmark	2021	9	2
Denmark	2022	8	2
Total		44	9

Scores and results list Denmark's goal tally first, score column indicates score after each Cornelius goal.

List of international goals scored by Andreas Cornelius
No.	Date	Venue	Opponent	Score	Result	Competition
1	22 March 2013	Andrův Stadion, Olomouc, Czech Republic	Czech Republic	1–0	3–0	2014 FIFA World Cup qualification
2	31 August 2016	CASA Arena, Horsens, Denmark	Liechtenstein	3–0	5–0	Friendly
3	11 November 2016	Parken Stadium, Copenhagen, Denmark	Kazakhstan	1–0	4–1	2018 FIFA World Cup qualification
4	1 September 2017	Parken Stadium, Copenhagen, Denmark	Poland	2–0	4–0	2018 FIFA World Cup qualification
5	7 October 2020	MCH Arena, Herning, Denmark	Faroe Islands	4–0	4–0	Friendly
6	6 June 2021	Brøndby Stadion, Brøndby, Denmark	Bosnia and Herzegovina	2–0	2–0	Friendly
7	7 September 2021	Parken Stadium, Copenhagen, Denmark	Israel	5–0	5–0	2022 FIFA World Cup qualification
8	3 June 2022	Stade de France, Saint-Denis, France	France	1–1	2–1	2022–23 UEFA Nations League A
9	3 June 2022	Stade de France, Saint-Denis, France	France	2–1	2–1	2022–23 UEFA Nations League A

== Honours ==
Copenhagen

- Danish Superliga: 2012–13, 2015–16, 2016–17, 2022–23, 2024–25
- Danish Cup: 2014–15, 2015–16, 2016–17, 2022–23, 2024–25

Trabzonspor

- Süper Lig: 2021–22
- Turkish Super Cup: 2022

Individual

- Danish Talent of the Year: 2013
- Danish Superliga Golden Boot: 2012–13
- Danish Superliga Player of the Year: 2012–13
- Copenhagen Player of the Season: 2012–13
