= Nicolai Jørgensen =

Danish footballer (born 1991)

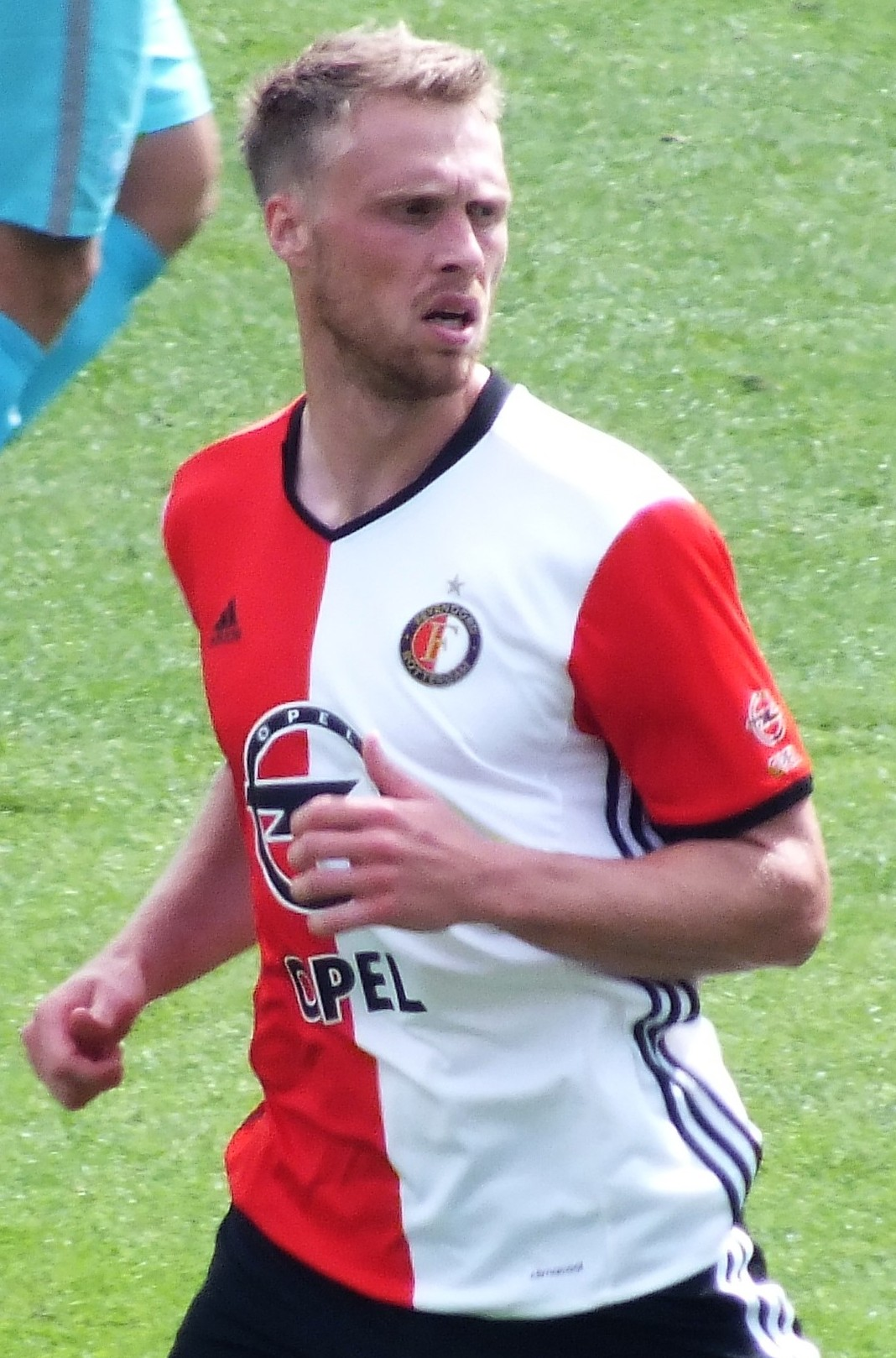
- Jørgensen with Feyenoord in 2017

Personal information
- Full name: Nicolai Mick Jørgensen
- Date of birth: 15 January 1991 (age 35)
- Place of birth: Ballerup, Denmark
- Height: 1.94 m (6 ft 4 in)
- Position: Forward

Youth career
- –2001: Skovlunde IF
- 2001–2006: AB
- 2006: Brøndby
- 2007–2009: AB

Senior career*
Years	Team	Apps	(Gls)
2009–2010	AB	31	(7)
2010–2012	Bayer Leverkusen	10	(0)
2012	→ Kaiserslautern (loan)	5	(0)
2012	→ Copenhagen (loan)	8	(3)
2012–2016	Copenhagen	91	(40)
2016–2021	Feyenoord	118	(48)
2021–2022	Kasımpaşa	15	(2)
2022	Copenhagen	9	(1)
Total		287	(101)

International career^{‡}
2009	Denmark U18	4	(1)
2009–2010	Denmark U19	12	(6)
2011	Denmark U20	1	(0)
2010–2012	Denmark U21	10	(1)
2011–2019	Denmark	41	(9)
- * Club domestic league appearances and goals as of 14:30, 25 June 2022 (UTC) ‡ National team caps and goals as of 11:29, 3 March 2020 (UTC)

Nicolai Mick Jørgensen (Danish pronunciation: [ˈne̝koˌlɑjˀ ˈme̝k ˈjɶɐ̯ˀn̩sn̩]; born 15 January 1991) is a Danish former professional footballer who played as a forward.

== Club career ==
=== Akademisk Boldklub ===
Nicolai Jørgensen began his career at Grantoften IF, he later joined Skovlunde IF and joined Akademisk Boldklub afterwards, where he played for nine years apart from half a year as a U-15 player in Brøndby IF.

=== Bayer Leverkusen ===
Jørgensen joined German team Bayer 04 Leverkusen for their pre-season training camp in July scoring four goals in his first 45-minute appearance, and was subsequently signed for a five-year contract with Leverkusen on 12 July 2010. He made his Bundesliga debut in a 3–6 defeat to Borussia Mönchengladbach on 29 August 2010 being introduced as a substitute after 63 minutes.

=== F.C. Copenhagen ===
In July 2012, Jørgensen returned to his native Denmark joining F.C. Copenhagen on a one-year loan. In September, the club announced to have had exercised a purchase option, making the deal permanent with Jørgensen signing a contract until 2016.

=== Feyenoord ===
During the summer of 2016, Jørgensen joined Feyenoord for €3.5 million signing a five-year deal. In his first season at the club he became the Eredivisie's top scorer with 21 goals, helping Feyenoord to win their first title since 1999.

On 22 April 2018, he scored the opening goal as Feyenoord won the 2017–18 KNVB Cup final 3–0 against AZ Alkmaar.

On 14 June 2019, Feyenoord announced that they had reached principle agreement with Jørgensen to extend his contract until 2022.

=== Return to Copenhagen ===
After terminating his contract with Turkish club Kasımpaşa, Jørgensen returned to his former club F.C. Copenhagen on 31 January 2022, signing a deal for the rest of the season. After a disappointing season with one goal in nine games, Jørgensen left the club in June 2022, as his contract came to an end.

== International career ==
On 4 October 2010, Jørgensen was called up for the Denmark's national football team, for the matches against Portugal and Cyprus in the UEFA Euro 2012 qualifying Group H. He scored the winning goal in the 70th minute against Belarus on 14 June 2011 in the 2011 UEFA European U-21 Football Championship. On 14 November 2015, he scored his first international goal for Denmark national football team in the UEFA Euro 2016 qualifying Playoffs against Sweden. Denmark had lost 1–2 to Sweden but it was a crucial away goal for Denmark.

In June 2018 he was named in Denmark's squad for the 2018 FIFA World Cup in Russia.

== Career statistics ==
=== Club ===
As of 22 May 2022

Appearances and goals by club, season and competition
Club	Season	League			National cup (Note: Includes Danish Cup, DFB-Pokal, KNVB Cup)		Continental		Other		Total	
Club	Season	Division	Apps	Goals	Apps	Goals	Apps	Goals	Apps	Goals	Apps	Goals
Akademisk Boldklub	2008–09	Danish 1st Division	8	0	0	0	—		—		8	0
Akademisk Boldklub	2009–10	Danish 1st Division	23	7	1	1	—		—		24	8
Akademisk Boldklub	Total		31	7	1	1	—		—		32	8
Bayer Leverkusen	2010–11	Bundesliga	9	0	1	0	8 (Note: Appearances in UEFA Europa League)	0	—		18	0
Bayer Leverkusen	2011–12	Bundesliga	1	0	0	0	1 (Note: Appearances in UEFA Champions League)	0	—		2	0
Bayer Leverkusen	Total		10	0	1	0	9	0	—		20	0
1. FC Kaiserslautern (loan)	2011–12	Bundesliga	5	0	0	0	—		—		5	0
Copenhagen	2012–13	Danish Superliga	27	11	1	0	8	1	—		36	12
Copenhagen	2013–14	Danish Superliga	16	7	2	0	6	1	—		24	8
Copenhagen	2014–15	Danish Superliga	25	10	4	0	8	2	—		37	12
Copenhagen	2015–16	Danish Superliga	31	15	5	2	4	2	—		40	19
Copenhagen	Total		99	43	12	2	26	6	—		137	51
Feyenoord	2016–17	Eredivisie	32	21	3	2	6	2	1 (Note: Appearance in Johan Cruyff Shield)	0	42	25
Feyenoord	2017–18	Eredivisie	26	10	3	1	4	2	1	0	34	13
Feyenoord	2018–19	Eredivisie	24	7	4	3	0	0	0	0	28	10
Feyenoord	2019–20	Eredivisie	13	5	2	0	2	0	—		17	5
Feyenoord	2020–21	Eredivisie	19	3	1	0	3	0	—		23	3
Feyenoord	Total		114	46	13	6	15	4	2	0	144	56
Kasımpaşa	2021–22	Süper Lig	15	2	0	0	—		—		15	2
Copenhagen	2021–22	Danish Superliga	9	1	0	0	—		—		9	1
Career total			283	99	27	9	50	10	2	0	362	118

=== International ===
As of match played 3 March 2020

Appearances and goals by national team and year
National team	Year	Apps	Goals
Denmark	2011	2	0
Denmark	2012	1	0
Denmark	2013	6	0
Denmark	2014	0	0
Denmark	2015	7	1
Denmark	2016	8	5
Denmark	2017	6	2
Denmark	2018	8	1
Denmark	2019	3	0
Total		41	9

Scores and results list Denmark's goal tally first, score column indicates score after each Jørgensen goal.

List of international goals scored by Nicolai Jørgensen
No.	Date	Venue	Opponent	Score	Result	Competition
1	14 November 2015	Friends Arena, Stockholm, Sweden	Sweden	1–2	1–2	UEFA Euro 2016 qualification
2	24 March 2016	MCH Arena, Herning, Denmark	Iceland	1–0	2–1	Friendly
3	24 March 2016	MCH Arena, Herning, Denmark	Iceland	2–0	2–1	Friendly
4	31 August 2016	CASA Arena, Horsens, Denmark	Liechtenstein	1–0	5–0	Friendly
5	31 August 2016	CASA Arena, Horsens, Denmark	Liechtenstein	2–0	5–0	Friendly
6	15 November 2016	Eden Arena, Prague, Czech Republic	Czech Republic	1–1	1–1	Friendly
7	10 June 2017	Almaty Central Stadium, Almaty, Kazakhstan	Kazakhstan	1–0	3–1	2018 FIFA World Cup qualification
8	1 September 2017	Telia Parken, Copenhagen, Denmark	Poland	3–0	4–0	2018 FIFA World Cup qualification
9	16 November 2018	Cardiff City Stadium, Cardiff, Wales	Wales	1–0	2–1	2018–19 UEFA Nations League B

== Honours ==
Copenhagen

- Danish Superliga: 2012–13, 2015–16, 2021–22
- Danish Cup: 2014–15, 2015–16

Feyenoord

- Eredivisie: 2016–17
- KNVB Cup: 2017–18
- Johan Cruijff Shield: 2017, 2018

Individual

- Eredivisie top scorer: 2016–17
