= Igor Vetokele =

Belgian footballer

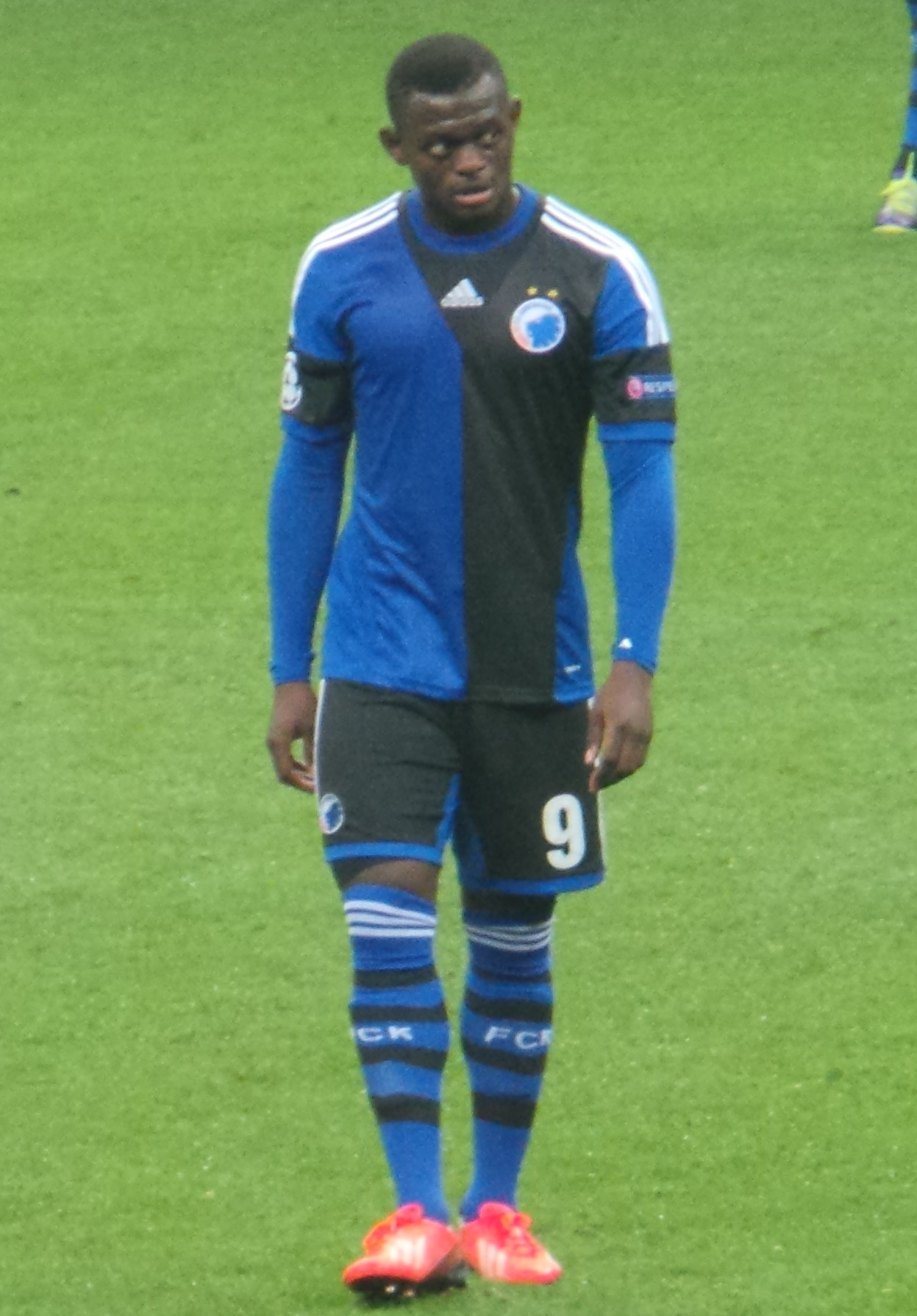
- Vetokele with Copenhagen in 2013

Personal information
- Full name: Igor Mavuba Vetokele
- Date of birth: 23 March 1992 (age 34)
- Place of birth: Ostend, Belgium
- Height: 1.73 m (5 ft 8 in)
- Position: Forward

Youth career
- 2006–2007: Oostende
- 2007–2010: Gent

Senior career*
| Years | Team | Apps | (Gls) |
| 2010–2011 | Gent | 0 | (0) |
| 2011–2012 | Cercle Brugge | 38 | (9) |
| 2012–2014 | Copenhagen | 45 | (16) |
| 2014–2019 | Charlton Athletic | 80 | (15) |
| 2016–2017 | → Zulte Waregem (loan) | 15 | (0) |
| 2017–2018 | → Sint-Truiden (loan) | 43 | (11) |
| 2019–2023 | Westerlo | 87 | (18) |
| 2023–2025 | Lommel | 27 | (6) |
| Total | | 335 | (75) |

International career^{‡}
| 2009 | Belgium U17 | 8 | (3) |
| 2009–2010 | Belgium U18 | 9 | (3) |
| 2010–2011 | Belgium U19 | 17 | (2) |
| 2012–2013 | Belgium U21 | 14 | (4) |
| 2014–2019 | Angola | 7 | (0) |
- * Club domestic league appearances and goals as of 17:10, 17 May 2025 (UTC) ‡ National team caps and goals as of 17:10, 17 May 2025 (UTC)

Igor Mavuba Vetokele (born 23 March 1992) is a former professional footballer who played as a forward. Born in Belgium, he also represented the Angola national team.

== Club career ==
=== Cercle Brugge ===
Vetokele started his youth career at Oostende in 2006 and after a year at the youth club he joined Gent. There, manager Bob Peeters saw him play and was impressed with his playing style. Vetokele appeared as an unused substitute in the last game of the season.

On 31 August 2011 Vetokele joined Cercle Brugge on a permanent transfer, where he rejoined Peeters. Vetokele made his Cercle Brugge debut, coming on as a substitute for Kevin Janssens in the 87th minute, in a 0–0 draw against Lierse on 17 September 2011. On 5 October 2011 Vetokele scored his first goal for the club, in a 2–1 win over Mechelen. In his first season at Cercle Brugge Vetokele made thirty-six appearances and scored eight goals in all competitions. In the opening game of the season Vetokele scored his first goal of the season in a 3–3 draw against Genk and went on to make four more appearances before leaving Cercle Brugge for Copenhagen.

=== Copenhagen ===
On 20 August 2012, Vetokele joined Copenhagen on a four-year contract with a fee of DKK 7,500,000. Prior the move, Danish newspapers reported that the club were linked to Vetoleke after finding a replacement for Dame N'Doye, who left for Lokomotiv Moscow.

He made his debut for F.C. Copenhagen in the last minutes of extra time in a Champions League playoff match against French side Lille OSC at Grand Stade Lille Métropole. Vetokele later recalled playing in the Champions League as a "nice experience". Vetokele scored on his league debut, on 15 September 2012, just two minutes after coming on as a substitute, in a 2–1 win over Nordsjælland. Vetokele scored his first European goal in the last game of the group stage, in a 1–1 draw against Steaua București, which saw Copenhagen eliminated from the Europa League tournament. However, his first season was poor as he made only fifteen appearances and scored only three times. Despite this, the club ended up winning the Danish Superliga, in a season where he had been struggling with muscle injury.

After a poor first season, Vetokele's goal drought continued, until it came to an end on 1 September 2013, in a 4–1 win over Viborg. Vetokele then scored three braces during the season against Nordsjælland on 2 November 2013, then against Viborg on 24 November 2013 and Brøndby on 1 December 2013. Two days after the Danish Cup Final, Vetokele scored the opener, in a 3–2 victory against OB, to ensure second place and earning the club a place in the Champions League. The goal also confirmed Vetokele as the club's top goalscorer with thirteen goals. Vetokele previously stated he hoped to score more goals throughout the season.

On 17 June 2014, F.C. Copenhagen accepted a bid from Championship side Charlton Athletic. Copenhagen agreed to the sale after the club purchased Steve De Ridder as they could no longer guarantee him first team football.

=== Charlton Athletic ===
On 24 June 2014, Charlton Athletic completed the signing of Vetokele from Copenhagen for £2.4 million on a five-year deal. Upon joining Charlton, Vetokele spoke of the move as a new challenge.

Vetokele made his competitive debut in a friendly match, a 0–0 draw against Sint-Truiden on 6 July 2014. After three goals in the pre-season friendlies, Vetokele scored on his Championship debut, putting Charlton ahead in a 1–1 draw away to League new-boys Brentford. He scored his second against Derby County, his third against Huddersfield Town and then scored twice against Brighton & Hove Albion. On 5 September, he was named Championship player of the month for August. Vetokele then scored in a 1–1 draw against Birmingham City on 4 October 2014, ending his five-game goal drought. After missing two games due to fitness concerned during a match against Bournemouth, Vetokele scored on his return on 1 November 2014, in a 1–1 draw against Sheffield Wednesday and scored seven days later, in a 1–0 win over Reading. He then scored three goals in three matches against Norwich City, Brentford and Wigan Athletic In his first season at Charlton Athletic Vetokele went on to make 33 appearances in all competitions, scoring 11 times.

On 24 June 2016, Vetokele joined Zulte Waregem on a season long loan deal.

He was released by Charlton at the end of the 2018–19 season.

=== Westerlo ===
On 26 June 2019, Vetokele joined Westerlo.

=== Lommel ===
In June 2023, Vetokele joined Challenger Pro League side Lommel.

== International career ==
Vetokele has represented Belgium at various youth levels, from under 16 to under 21. In May 2014, Vetokele pledged his commitment to play for Angola.

== Career statistics ==
=== Club ===
As of match played 18 April 2025

| Club | Season | League | | | National cup (Note: Includes Belgian Cup, Danish Cup, FA Cup) | | League cup (Note: Includes Football League Cup) | | Other | | Total | |
| Club | Season | Division | Apps | Goals | Apps | Goals | Apps | Goals | Apps | Goals | Apps | Goals |
|---|---|---|---|---|---|---|---|---|---|---|---|---|
| Cercle Brugge | 2011–12 | Belgian Pro League | 34 | 8 | 2 | 0 | — | | 0 | 0 | 36 | 8 |
| Cercle Brugge | 2012–13 | Belgian Pro League | 4 | 1 | 0 | 0 | — | | 0 | 0 | 4 | 1 |
| Cercle Brugge | Total | | 38 | 9 | 2 | 0 | — | | 0 | 0 | 40 | 9 |
| Copenhagen | 2012–13 | Danish Superliga | 15 | 3 | 0 | 0 | — | | 2 (Note: Appearances in UEFA Europa League) | 1 | 17 | 4 |
| Copenhagen | 2013–14 | Danish Superliga | 30 | 13 | 3 | 1 | — | | 1 (Note: Appearance in UEFA Champions League) | 0 | 34 | 14 |
| Copenhagen | Total | | 45 | 16 | 3 | 1 | — | | 3 | 1 | 51 | 18 |
| Charlton Athletic | 2014–15 | Championship | 41 | 11 | 0 | 0 | 2 | 0 | — | | 43 | 11 |
| Charlton Athletic | 2015–16 | Championship | 16 | 1 | 1 | 0 | 1 | 1 | — | | 18 | 2 |
| Charlton Athletic | 2016–17 | League One | 0 | 0 | 0 | 0 | 0 | 0 | 0 | 0 | 0 | 0 |
| Charlton Athletic | 2017–18 | League One | 0 | 0 | 0 | 0 | 0 | 0 | 0 | 0 | 0 | 0 |
| Charlton Athletic | 2018–19 | League One | 23 | 3 | 0 | 0 | 0 | 0 | 2 (Note: Appearances in EFL Trophy) | 2 | 25 | 5 |
| Charlton Athletic | Total | | 80 | 15 | 1 | 0 | 3 | 1 | 2 | 2 | 86 | 18 |
| Zulte Waregem (loan) | 2016–17 | Belgian First Division A | 15 | 0 | 3 | 1 | — | | — | | 18 | 1 |
| Sint-Truiden (loan) | 2016–17 | Belgian First Division A | 17 | 8 | 0 | 0 | — | | — | | 17 | 8 |
| Sint-Truiden (loan) | 2017–18 | Belgian First Division A | 26 | 3 | 1 | 2 | — | | — | | 27 | 5 |
| Sint-Truiden (loan) | Total | | 43 | 11 | 1 | 2 | — | | — | | 44 | 13 |
| Westerlo | 2019–20 | Belgian First Division B | 18 | 4 | 1 | 0 | — | | — | | 19 | 4 |
| Westerlo | 2020–21 | Belgian First Division B | 26 | 8 | 1 | 0 | — | | — | | 27 | 8 |
| Westerlo | 2021–22 | Belgian First Division B | 16 | 1 | 2 | 0 | — | | — | | 18 | 1 |
| Westerlo | 2022–23 | Belgian Pro League | 27 | 5 | 1 | 0 | — | | — | | 28 | 5 |
| Westerlo | Total | | 87 | 18 | 5 | 0 | — | | — | | 92 | 18 |
| Lommel | 2023–24 | Challenger Pro League | 16 | 6 | 1 | 0 | — | | — | | 17 | 6 |
| Lommel | 2024–25 | Challenger Pro League | 11 | 0 | 0 | 0 | — | | — | | 11 | 0 |
| Lommel | Total | | 27 | 6 | 1 | 0 | — | | — | | 28 | 6 |
| Career total | | | 335 | 75 | 16 | 4 | 3 | 1 | 5 | 3 | 359 | 83 |

== Honours ==
Copenhagen

- Danish Superliga: 2012–13
- Danish Cup runner-up: 2013–14

Westerlo

- Belgian First Division B: 2021–22
