= Thomas Delaney =

Danish footballer (born 1991)

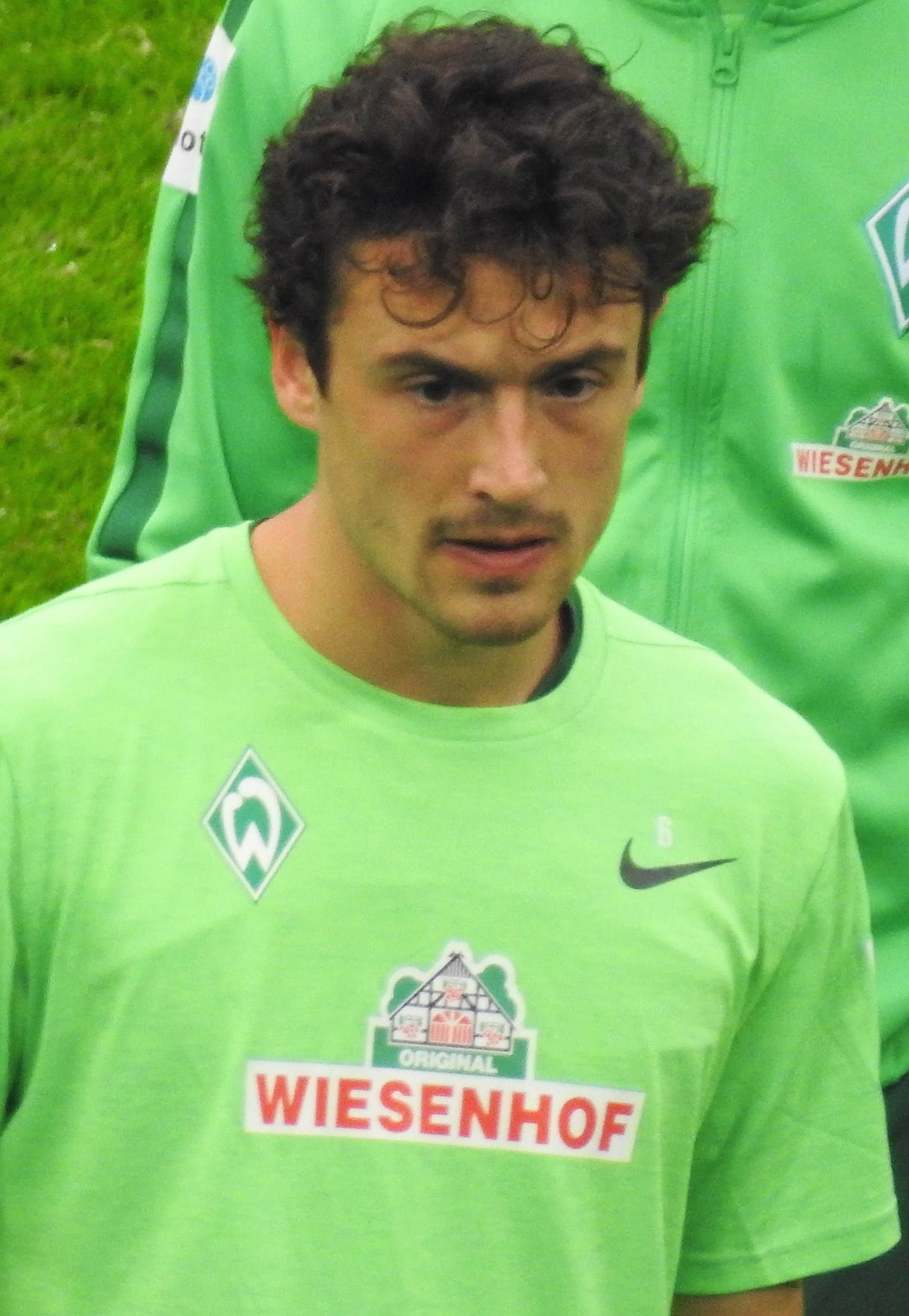
- Delaney training with Werder Bremen in 2017

Personal information
- Full name: Thomas Joseph Delaney
- Date of birth: 3 September 1991 (age 35)
- Place of birth: Frederiksberg, Denmark
- Height: 1.82 m (6 ft 0 in)
- Position: Defensive midfielder

Team information
- Current team: Copenhagen
- Number: 27

Youth career
- 1993–2008: Copenhagen

Senior career*
Years	Team	Apps	(Gls)
2008–2016	Copenhagen	172	(19)
2017–2018	Werder Bremen	45	(7)
2018–2021	Borussia Dortmund	62	(4)
2021–2024	Sevilla	34	(2)
2023	→ TSG Hoffenheim (loan)	6	(0)
2023–2024	→ Anderlecht (loan)	23	(1)
2024–	Copenhagen	56	(6)

International career
2008–2009	Denmark U18	3	(0)
2009–2010	Denmark U19	11	(1)
2011	Denmark U20	2	(0)
2010–2012	Denmark U21	11	(0)
2013–2024	Denmark	81	(8)
- * Club domestic league appearances and goals as of 26 October 2026

Thomas Joseph Delaney (born 3 September 1991) is a Danish professional footballer who plays as a defensive midfielder for Danish Superliga club Copenhagen.

Delaney began his career at Copenhagen, making 249 total appearances and scoring 24 goals, while winning the Danish Superliga five times and the Danish Cup on four occasions. He then played in Germany for Werder Bremen and Borussia Dortmund, making 107 total Bundesliga appearances, before a move to Sevilla in 2021. Following loan stints at TSG Hoffenheim and Anderlecht, Delaney returned to Copenhagen in 2024. Delaney made his international debut for Denmark in 2013. He was part of their squads at the 2018 FIFA World Cup, UEFA Euro 2020, the 2022 World Cup and Euro 2024, reaching the semi-finals of the 2020 tournament.

== Club career ==
=== Copenhagen ===
Delaney started playing youth football at Kjøbenhavns Boldklub, the reserve team of Danish club Copenhagen. Delaney made his debut for Copenhagen in an unofficial friendly in August 2008. After playing the first half of the 2008–09 season in the KB youth team, he was a part of the FCK squad in the Danish Cup that campaign. He made his official debut in the first leg of the semi-finals against Nordvest FC in April, where he substituted Hjalte Nørregaard in the middle of second half. In the return leg two weeks later Delaney was among the starting eleven playing the first 60 minutes before he was substituted with Şaban Özdoğan.

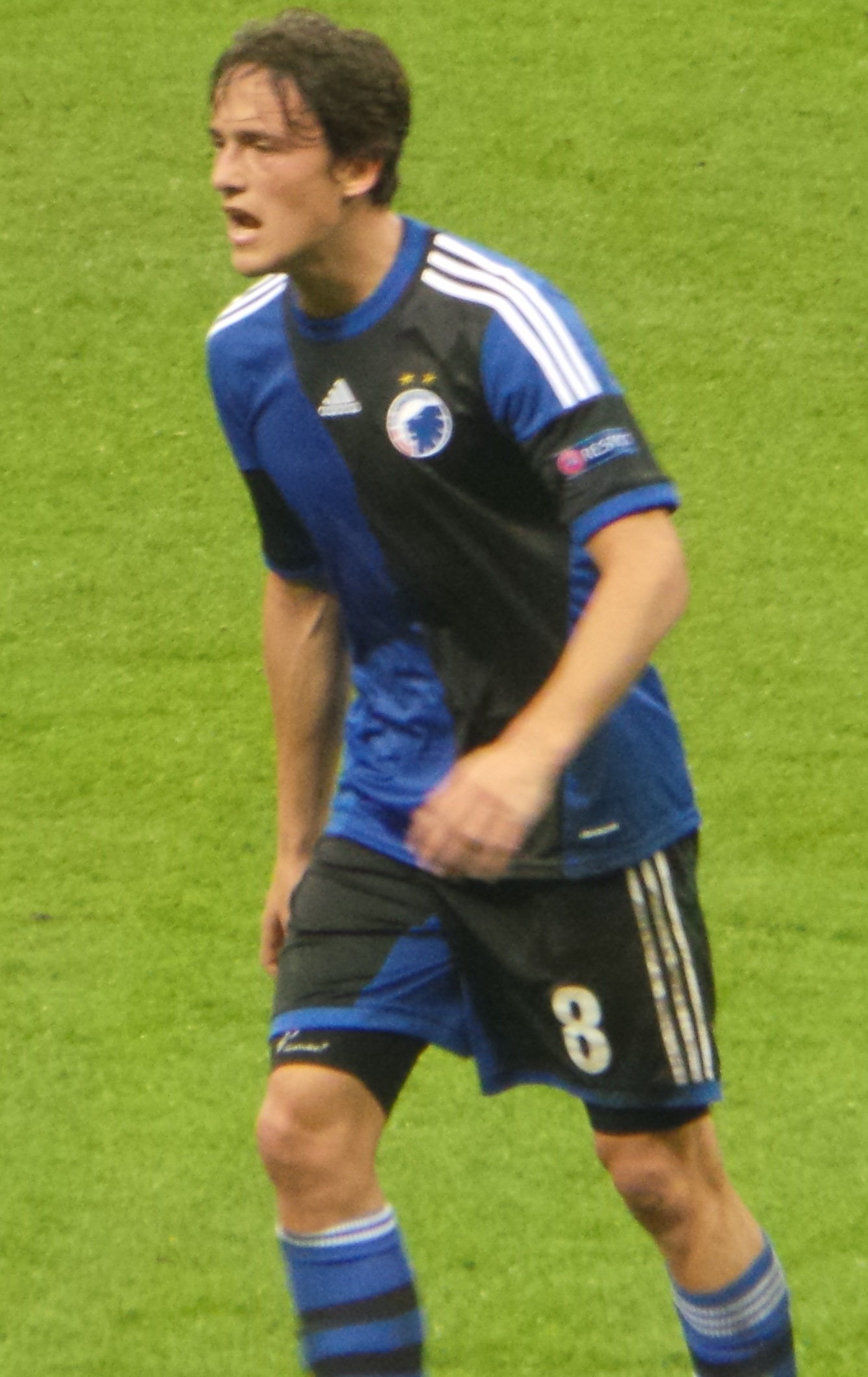
Delaney playing for Copenhagen in 2013

In the summer break 2009, he was promoted to the first team squad together with Şaban Özdoğan. He scored on his continental debut on 22 July 2009, playing the full second leg in Copenhagen's Champions League second qualifying round victory over FK Mogren. His first Superliga match was on 9 August 2009 against SønderjyskE replacing Atiba Hutchinson near the end of the match. On 29 December 2011, signed a contract extension keeping him at Copenhagen until the end of 2014. At the time, Delaney had the distinction of being the longest serving current player at the club, despite being only 20.

On 6 July 2013, Delaney extended his contract with the club to 2015. At the same time, he got jersey number 8. In the following season, he became a regular starter in his favorite position, including UEFA Champions League matches against Juventus, Real Madrid and Galatasaray. On 23 January 2014, he again extended his contract, until 2017. At the same time, he was officially named vice-captain of the team. Half a year later, Delaney was promoted to club captain.

On 14 May 2015 he was named Man of the Match as his side won the Danish Cup final 3–2 after extra-time against fellow Superliga side FC Vestsjælland. On 27 September 2016, Delaney contributed to a comfortable 4–0 victory for his side with a left-footed half-volley from 30 yards against Belgian side Club Brugge KV in the UEFA Champions League. The goal came third in the vote for goal of the season in the UEFA Champions League.

=== Werder Bremen ===
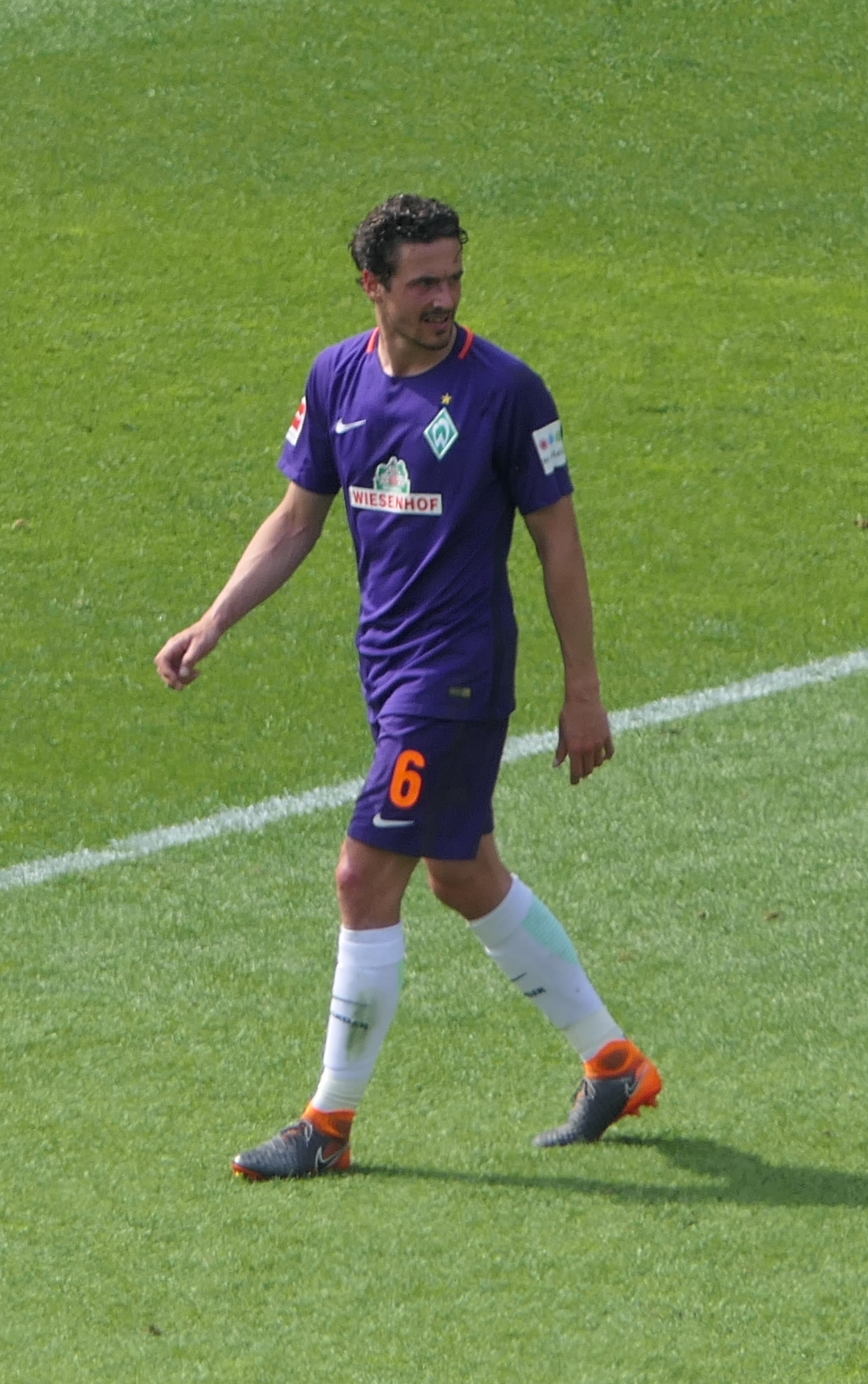
Delaney playing for Werder Bremen in 2018

On 17 August 2016, Werder Bremen announced Delaney would be joining the club in January 2017.

On 18 February 2017, he scored his first goal for the club, a free kick, in Werder Bremen's 2–0 win away to Mainz 05 before being stretchered off the pitch with a suspected concussion. It was the club's first win of the new year following four straight defeats. On 1 April 2017, Delaney scored a hat-trick, the first of his career, in Werder Bremen's 5–2 win away against SC Freiburg.

=== Borussia Dortmund ===
On 7 June 2018, Delaney signed for Borussia Dortmund on a four-year contract. The transfer fee paid to Werder Bremen was reported as €20 million. On 13 May 2021, Delaney was a second-half substitute for Dortmund in their 4–1 victory over RB Leipzig in the 2021 DFB-Pokal Final.

=== Sevilla ===
On 25 August 2021, Delaney moved to Spain to join La Liga side Sevilla on a four-year deal for a fee reported by Diario de Sevilla as €7 million.

==== Loan to TSG Hoffenheim ====
On 30 January 2023, Delaney returned to Germany and joined TSG Hoffenheim on loan until the end of the 2022–23 season.

==== Loan to Anderlecht ====
On 22 August 2023, Delaney joined Belgian Pro League club Anderlecht on a season-long loan with an option-to-buy. He made his debut for the club on 27 August 2023 in a 2–1 victory against Charleroi.

He scored his first goal for the Mauves on 1 December 2023, in a 3–1 away win against KVC Westerlo. With Anderlecht, Delaney was inconsistent, mainly due to injuries, which limited his playing time at the Belgian giants, eventually leading to Anderlecht not triggering the buy option for Delaney. He made a total of 25 appearances for the club.

==== Return to Copenhagen ====
On 20 July 2024, after 7.5 years he finally made his return to Danish Superliga club FC København, signing a two-year deal.

== International career ==
Delaney made his debut for the Denmark under-18 team in October 2008, and went on to play three matches in total. He played 11 games for the Denmark U-19 team. On 11 August 2010, he made his debut for the Denmark U-21 team in a friendly against the Italy U-21 team.

Delaney made his debut for the senior national team on 15 October 2013 in a 2014 FIFA World Cup qualification match against Malta. He played the full 90 minutes of the 6–0 home win. His second cap did not come until 25 March 2015, as a half-time substitute in a 3–2 friendly win over the United States in Aarhus.

Delaney scored his first international goal on 1 September 2017 to open a 4–0 home win over Poland in 2018 FIFA World Cup qualification. Three days later, he scored a hat-trick as the team came from behind to win 4–1 away to Armenia.

In June 2018, he was named in Denmark's squad for the World Cup in Russia. He was also named in the 26-man squad for UEFA Euro 2020. He scored the first goal in the 2–1 quarter-final game against the Czech Republic.

On 25 August 2024, Delaney announced his retirement from international football. He scored eight goals in 81 international appearances.

== Personal life ==
Delaney was born in Denmark and spent his youth there. His father was also born in Denmark but has American citizenship due to his own father (Thomas Delaney's paternal grandfather) being born in the United States. Delaney also has Irish roots through his paternal great-grandfather who moved from Ireland to the United States in the 19th century during the Great Famine. Delaney is red–green colour blind.

Delaney married Michelle Lindemann Jensen on 27 December 2020. Michelle is the daughter of former Brøndby coach Henrik Jensen and the sister of former national team player Mike Jensen. Delaney and Michelle met while studying at Niels Brock Copenhagen Business College. They have a daughter, Billie, born in February 2021.

== Career statistics ==
=== Club ===
As of match played 29 October 2026

Appearances and goals by club, season and competition
Club	Season	League			National cup (Note: Includes Danish Cup, DFB-Pokal, Copa del Rey, Belgian Cup)		Europe		Other		Total	
Club	Season	Division	Apps	Goals	Apps	Goals	Apps	Goals	Apps	Goals	Apps	Goals
Copenhagen	2008–09	Danish Superliga	—		2	0	—		—		2	0
Copenhagen	2009–10	Danish Superliga	9	0	3	0	3 (Note: One appearance and one goal in UEFA Champions League, two appearances in UEFA Europa League)	1	—		12	1
Copenhagen	2010–11	Danish Superliga	16	1	2	0	2 (Note: Appearances in UEFA Champions League)	0	—		20	1
Copenhagen	2011–12	Danish Superliga	19	1	1	0	7 (Note: Three appearances in UEFA Champions League, four appearances in UEFA Europa League)	0	—		27	1
Copenhagen	2012–13	Danish Superliga	21	1	3	0	8 (Note: Two appearances in UEFA Champions League, six appearances in UEFA Europa League)	0	—		32	1
Copenhagen	2013–14	Danish Superliga	32	3	5	0	6	0	—		43	3
Copenhagen	2014–15	Danish Superliga	27	2	5	1	10 (Note: Four appearances in UEFA Champions League, six appearances in UEFA Europa League)	0	—		42	3
Copenhagen	2015–16	Danish Superliga	29	5	5	1	4 (Note: Appearances in UEFA Europa League)	0	—		38	6
Copenhagen	2016–17	Danish Superliga	19	6	0	0	11	2	—		30	8
Copenhagen	Total		172	19	26	2	51	3	—		249	24
Werder Bremen	2016–17	Bundesliga	13	4	—		—		—		13	4
Werder Bremen	2017–18	Bundesliga	32	3	4	0	—		—		36	3
Werder Bremen	Total		45	7	4	0	—		—		49	7
Borussia Dortmund	2018–19	Bundesliga	30	3	2	0	6	0	—		38	3
Borussia Dortmund	2019–20	Bundesliga	11	0	0	0	3	0	0	0	14	0
Borussia Dortmund	2020–21	Bundesliga	20	1	6	0	7	0	1 (Note: Appearance in DFL-Supercup)	0	34	1
Borussia Dortmund	2021–22	Bundesliga	1	0	1	0	0	0	0	0	2	0
Borussia Dortmund	Total		62	4	9	0	16	0	1	0	88	4
Sevilla	2021–22	La Liga	26	2	2	0	7 (Note: Four appearances in UEFA Champions League, three appearances in UEFA Europa League)	0	—		35	2
Sevilla	2022–23	La Liga	8	0	0	0	4	0	—		12	0
Sevilla	Total		34	2	2	0	11	0	—		47	2
TSG Hoffenheim (loan)	2022–23	Bundesliga	6	0	1	0	—		—		7	0
Anderlecht (loan)	2023–24	Belgian Pro League	23	1	2	0	—		—		25	1
Copenhagen	2024–25	Danish Superliga	24	5	3	1	10 (Note: Appearances in UEFA Conference League)	0	—		37	6
Copenhagen	2025–26	Danish Superliga	21	1	5	0	6	0	1 (Note: Appearance in Danish Superliga European play-off)	0	33	1
Copenhagen	2026–27	Danish Superliga	11	0	1	0	7	0	—		19	0
Copenhagen	Total		56	6	9	1	23	0	1	0	89	7
Career total			398	39	53	3	101	3	2	0	554	45

=== International ===
Appearances and goals by national team and year
National team	Year	Apps	Goals
Denmark	2013	1	0
Denmark	2014	0	0
Denmark	2015	4	0
Denmark	2016	9	0
Denmark	2017	9	4
Denmark	2018	11	0
Denmark	2019	9	1
Denmark	2020	7	0
Denmark	2021	15	2
Denmark	2022	7	0
Denmark	2023	3	1
Denmark	2024	6	0
Total		81	8

Scores and results list Denmark's goal tally first.

List of international goals scored by Thomas Delaney
No.	Date	Venue	Opponent	Score	Result	Competition
1.	1 September 2017	Parken Stadium, Copenhagen, Denmark	Poland	1–0	4–0	2018 FIFA World Cup qualification
2.	4 September 2017	Vazgen Sargsyan Republican Stadium, Yerevan, Armenia	Armenia	1–1	4–1	2018 FIFA World Cup qualification
3.	4 September 2017	Vazgen Sargsyan Republican Stadium, Yerevan, Armenia	Armenia	3–1	4–1	2018 FIFA World Cup qualification
4.	4 September 2017	Vazgen Sargsyan Republican Stadium, Yerevan, Armenia	Armenia	4–1	4–1	2018 FIFA World Cup qualification
5.	5 September 2019	Victoria Stadium, Gibraltar	Gibraltar	4–0	6–0	UEFA Euro 2020 qualifying
6.	3 July 2021	Olympic Stadium, Baku, Azerbaijan	Czech Republic	1–0	2–1	UEFA Euro 2020
7.	7 September 2021	Parken Stadium, Copenhagen, Denmark	Israel	4–0	5–0	2022 FIFA World Cup qualification
8.	17 November 2023	Parken Stadium, Copenhagen, Denmark	Slovenia	2–1	2–1	UEFA Euro 2024 qualifying

== Honours ==
Copenhagen

- Danish Superliga: 2009–10, 2010–11, 2012–13, 2015–16, 2016–17, 2024–25
- Danish Cup: 2011–12, 2014–15, 2015–16, 2016–17, 2024–25

Borussia Dortmund

- DFB-Pokal: 2020–21
- DFL-Supercup: 2019

Individual

- Arla's Talent Award: 2009
- F.C. Copenhagen Player of the Year: 2015, 2016
- Danish Superliga Player of the Year: 2015–16
