= Palle Petersen =

Danish footballer (born 1959)

Personal information
- Date of birth: 1 June 1959 (age 65)
- Place of birth: Denmark
- Position(s): Goalkeeper

Senior career*
Years	Team	Apps	(Gls)
1982–1985	AB		
1985–1992	B 1903	50	(0)
1992–1994	FCK	51	(0)
1994–1995	Lyngby	2	(0)
- *Club domestic league appearances and goals

Palle Petersen (born 1 June 1959) is a Danish former footballer who played as a goalkeeper.

== Early life ==
Petersen was born in 1959 in Denmark. He operated as a striker as a child.

== Career ==
Petersen started his career with Danish side AB. In 1985, he signed for Danish side B 1903. In 1992, he signed for Danish side FCK. He helped the club win the league. In 1994, he signed for Danish side Lyngby.

== Personal life ==
Petersen was nicknamed "Plankeværk". He is the father of Danish footballers Kenneth Emil Petersen and Christian Emil Petersen.
