= Mads Agesen =

Danish footballer (born 1983)

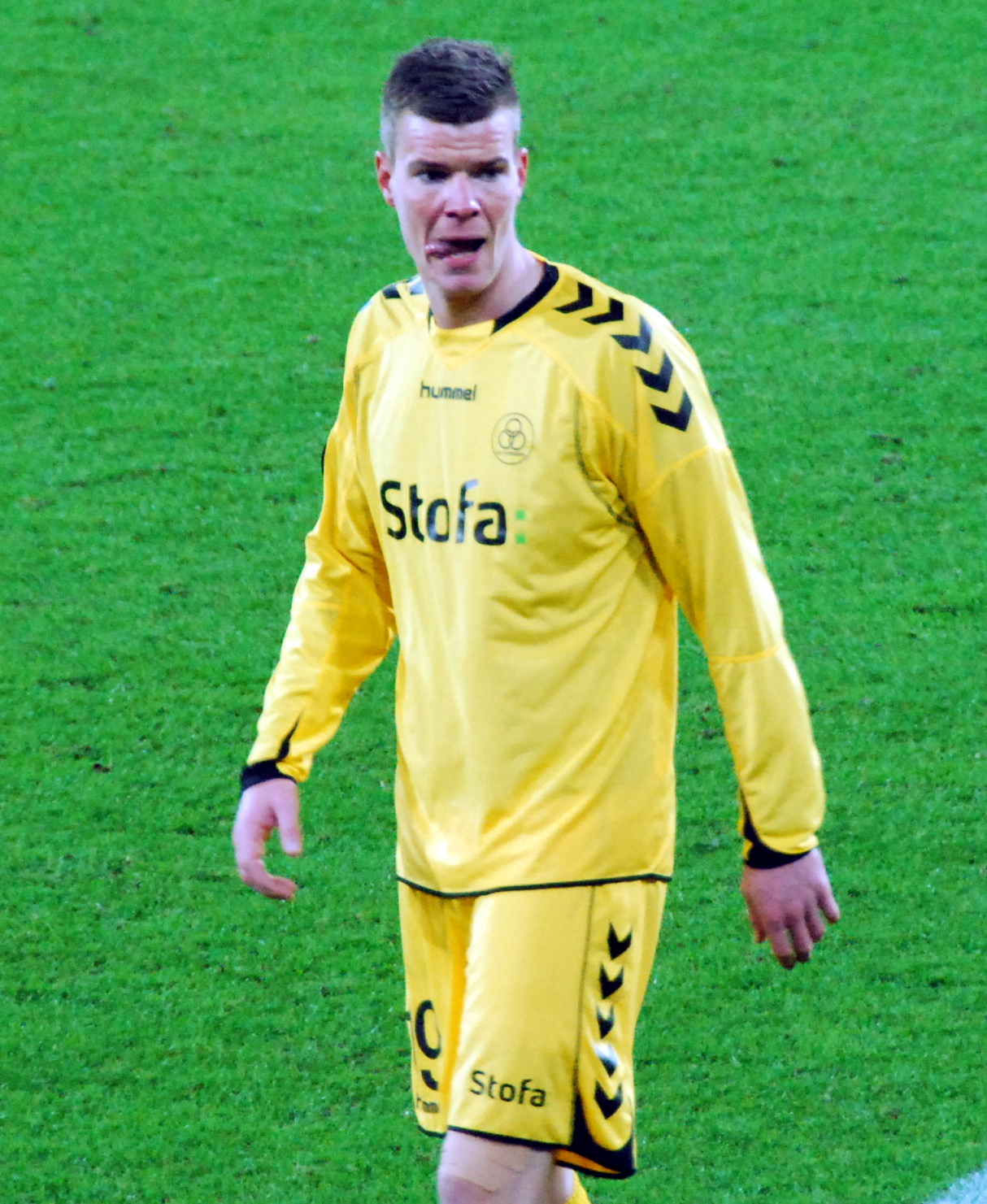
- Agesen in 2012

Personal information
- Full name: Mads Agesen
- Date of birth: 17 March 1983 (age 43)
- Place of birth: Thisted, Denmark
- Height: 1.90 m (6 ft 3 in)
- Position: Defender

Senior career*
Years	Team	Apps	(Gls)
–2004	Thisted FC		
2004–2005	AGF II		
2005–2007	Thisted FC		
2007–2008	Aarhus Fremad		
2008–2010	FC Fredericia	68	(5)
2010–2013	AC Horsens	49	(0)
2013–2018	Randers FC	122	(3)
- * Club domestic league appearances and goals

Mads Agesen (born 17 March 1983) is a Danish former professional footballer who played as a defender. He currently serves as sporting director at Viborg.

== Club career ==
Agesen joined AGF from Thisted FC in January 2004. He had moved with his girlfriend to the city when he had to started his studies. He started on their reserve team in the Denmark Series. But in June 2004, AGF decided to offer him a contract.

Thisted FC announced in July 2005 that they had signed Agesen back from AGF.

After one season with Aarhus Fremad, Agesen signed onto FC Fredericia in June 2008 on a part-time deal. He became a very important player for the club and the captain. After two good seasons, he left the team.

On 1 September 2010, it was confirmed that Agesen had signed a three-year contract with AC Horsens. This transfer was a division step-up for Agesen.

Agesen suffered from jumpers knee in his first season at the club, and played in fewer games. He was out with jumpers knees for about 1 year, but returned to the pitch after a saline injection in February 2012. In August of the same year, he suffered from a pulled muscle injury. This time, he was only out for 6 weeks. In March 2013, he broke his jaw and was out for three weeks. Due to his many injuries, he did not play in many games with the club and left in the summer of 2013.

=== Randers ===
On 4 January 2013 it was confirmed that Agesen had signed a three-year contract with Randers beginning in the summer 2013. Randers tried to sign him already starting in January, but AC Horsens didn't allow him to transfer until the season was done.

In May 2015, Agesen was operated on for a sports hernia. A month later, he extended his contract until 2018. He recovered from his injury and returned to play in August 2015.

== Post-retirement ==
On 11 March 2023, Agesen was named as the sporting director at Viborg. He had previously served as chief scout at Randers from 2021 until his move to Viborg.
