= Thomas Kristensen (footballer, born 1983) =

Danish footballer

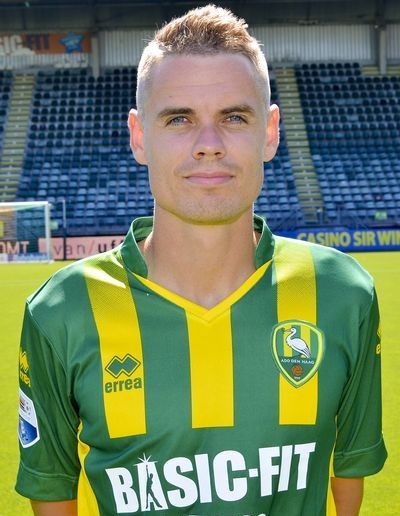
- Thomas Kristensen in 2015

Personal information
- Full name: Thomas Fauerskov Kristensen
- Date of birth: 17 April 1983 (age 43)
- Place of birth: Virum, Denmark
- Height: 1.88 m (6 ft 2 in)
- Position: Midfielder

Team information
- Current team: Nordsjælland (transition coach)

Youth career
- Virum-Sorgenfri
- Søllerød-Vedbæk
- AB

Senior career*
Years	Team	Apps	(Gls)
2002–2004	Lyngby	42	(8)
2005–2008	Nordsjælland	96	(18)
2008–2014	Copenhagen	154	(5)
2014–2016	ADO Den Haag	48	(2)
2016–2019	Brisbane Roar	60	(6)
2019–2020	Helsingør	18	(2)
Total		408	(41)

International career
2008–2012	Denmark	9	(0)

Managerial career
- 2020–2021: Lyngby (U19 assistant)
- 2020: Lyngby (U19 caretaker)
- 2021: Lyngby (assistant)
- 2021–2023: Lyngby (transition coach)
- 2021–202X: Denmark U-18 (assistant)
- 2023–: Nordsjælland (transition coach)
- * Club domestic league appearances and goals

Thomas Fauerskov Kristensen (born 17 April 1983) is a Danish former professional footballer who played as a midfielder. He is currently working as a transition coach at FC Nordsjælland.

Kristensen has been capped eleven times for the Denmark national team.

== Club career ==
=== Nordsjælland ===
In January 2005 Kristensen moved from Lyngby Boldklub in Danish 2nd Division to the Danish Superliga team FC Nordsjælland. Although it was a big step up, Kristensen became a regular first team player from the beginning.

=== Copenhagen ===
In both the 2007–08 winter and 2008 summer transfer windows, Kristensen had been rumoured to be in the process of a deal with F.C. Copenhagen (FCK). On 9 July 2008 TV 2 Sporten reported that Kristensen had agreed with FCK, and only the transfer fee needed to be agreed.

In the beginning, FCK and Nordsjælland could not agree on a transfer fee, so it was announced that Kristensen would join F.C. Copenhagen on 1 January 2009 on a free transfer. The clubs subsequently agreed on a transfer fee the next day, and on 15 July 2008 Kristensen became a F.C. Copenhagen player.

Only two days later Kristensen played his first match for FCK. It was a UEFA Cup qualifier against Cliftonville at Mourneview Park, where he replaced William Kvist in the 69th minute.

In May 2014 Thomas Kristensen secured a 3–2 victory against Odense Boldklub in the 86th minute. This meant that FCK finished 2nd, in the league table that season.

=== Eredivisie ===
On 22 June 2014, it was announced that Kristensen had signed a two-year deal with Eredivisie side ADO Den Haag.

=== Brisbane Roar ===
On 27 July 2016, Kristensen was signed to A-League side Brisbane Roar.

On 19 March 2017, against Adelaide United with late drama, Brisbane's goalkeeper, Michael Theo had been sent off along with Marcelo Carrusca for Adelaide. The referee (Stephan Lucas) had also pointed to the penalty spot. The Roar were ready to make their change. However, they used up their three substitutes, so their other goalkeeper, Jamie Young could not come on to the field. Kristensen was chosen to be their backup goalkeeper and switched jerseys from outfield to goalkeeper jersey as he faced Sergio Cirio into a penalty kick which was converted by the Adelaide striker in the 98th minute which ended into a 2–1 win for Adelaide United.

=== Helsingør ===
On 1 August 2019 FC Helsingør confirmed, that Kristensen had joined the club on a 1-year contract.

On 7 August 2020, Kristensen announced his retirement from football.

== International career ==
In January 2007 Kristensen was called upon by the Danish national team, which was touring north and Central America in a string of friendly games in the United States, El Salvador and Honduras, by team manager, Morten Olsen. He played the two last games of the tour against El Salvador and Honduras.

In August 2007 Kristensen again was again selected by Olsen, for an A national friendly against Ireland, though he sat on the bench the whole match in the 0–4 defeat. Half a month later he was called up again for the Euro 2008 qualifiers against Sweden and Liechtenstein. Kristensen was subsequently scratched from the team due to an injury.

In January 2008 Kristensen was called upon for the league national team again. This time for a tour of the Middle East.

Kristensen's A national team debut came on 2008-03-26 against Czech Republic. He started the game in central midfield next to Sevilla FC player Christian Poulsen and played the first 65 minutes. In the 26th minute he made the assist to Nicklas Bendtner's goal.

Kristensen was also in the squad for the friendlies against Netherlands and Poland. In these two matches he only played the last 27 minutes against Poland.

== Managerial career ==
After retiring, Kristensen was hired as an assistant coach for the U19s of his former club Lyngby Boldklub. After Lyngby's first team coach, Christian Nielsen, was hit by a ball in the face in November 2020 and therefore was on sick leave, U-19 manager Carit Falch was promoted as manager for the Danish Superliga-team. Kristensen then took charge of the U19s for the rest of 2020.

Alongside being the head coach of the U19s, Kristensen also helped Carit Falch on the Superliga-team until Christmas 2020. From 1 January 2021, a new U-19 head coach was appointed, and Kristensen continued in his role as assistant coach for the U19s and also became a permanent part of the first team staff under Falch. However, it became too time-consuming for Kristensen, and he decided to give up his position on the U-19 team, to focus as part of the staff on the first team under Falch.

On 26 June 2021, Kristensen accepted a new role at Lyngby as a transition coach, a role that aims to be the link between the youth players and the first team. On 16 August 2021, Kristensen was also hired as an assistant coach for the Danish U-18 national team.

On 7 June 2023, Kristensen returned to his former club, FC Nordsjælland, in a position as transition coach.

== Career statistics ==
As of 1 July 2020

Club	Season	League			Cup		Continental		Total	
Club	Season	Division	Apps	Goals	Apps	Goals	Apps	Goals	Apps	Goals
Lyngby	2002–03	1. Division	26	3			—		26	3
Lyngby	2003–04	1. Division	16	5			—		16	5
Lyngby	Total		42	8			—		42	8
Nordsjælland	2004–05	Danish Superliga	13	1			—		13	1
Nordsjælland	2005–06	Danish Superliga	26	2			—		26	2
Nordsjælland	2006–07	Danish Superliga	30	9			—		30	9
Nordsjælland	2007–08	Danish Superliga	27	6			—		27	6
Nordsjælland	Total		96	18	0	0	—		96	18
Copenhagen	2008–09	Danish Superliga	26	0	6	0	12	1	44	1
Copenhagen	2009–10	Danish Superliga	23	0	2	0	8	1	33	1
Copenhagen	2010–11	Danish Superliga	27	1	2	1	3	0	32	2
Copenhagen	2011–12	Danish Superliga	25	1	5	0	6	0	36	1
Copenhagen	2012–13	Danish Superliga	27	0	3	2	10	0	40	2
Copenhagen	2013–14	Danish Superliga	26	3	6	1	3	0	35	4
Copenhagen	Total		154	5	24	4	42	2	220	11
ADO Den Haag	2014–15	Eredivisie	30	1	1	1	—		31	2
ADO Den Haag	2015–16	Eredivisie	18	1	1	0	—		19	1
ADO Den Haag	Total		48	2	2	1	—		50	3
Brisbane Roar	2016–17	A-League	25	4	—		4	0	29	4
Brisbane Roar	2017–18	A-League	18	2	1	0	0	0	19	2
Brisbane Roar	2018–19	A-League	17	0	1	0	—		18	0
Brisbane Roar	Total		60	6	2	0	4	0	66	6
Helsingør	2019–10	1. Division	18	2	0	0	—		18	2
Career total			408	41	28	5	46	2	478	48

== Honours ==
Copenhagen

- Danish Superliga: 2008–09, 2009–10, 2010–11, 2012–13
- Danish Cup: 2008–09, 2011–12
