= 2011–12 F.C. Copenhagen season =

F.C. Copenhagen
2011–12 season
- Chairman: Hans Munk Nielsen
- Manager: Roland Nilsson; Carsten V. Jensen
- Superliga: 2nd
- Danish Cup: Winners
- UEFA Champions League: Play-off round
- UEFA Europa League: Group stage
- Top goalscorer: League: Dame N'Doye (19); All: Dame N'Doye (26)
- Highest home attendance: 27,853 (vs Hannover 96, 3 November 2011)
- Lowest home attendance: 6,099 (vs HB Køge, 27 November 2011)
- Average home league attendance: 14,917
Home colours	Away colours

This article shows statistics of individual players for the football club F.C. Copenhagen. It also lists all matches that F.C. Copenhagen played in the 2011–12 season.

== Players ==
=== Squad information ===
This section show the squad as currently, considering all players who are confirmedly moved in and out (see section Players in / out).

N	Pos.	Nat.	Name	Age	EU	Since	App	Goals	Ends	Transfer fee	Notes
1	GK	(Denmark)	K. Christensen	46	EU	2010	9	0	2013	Undisclosed	
2	RB	(Denmark)	Jacobsen	46	EU	2011	187	4	2014	Free	
3	LB	(Sweden)	Bengtsson	37	EU	2011 (Winter)	36	0	2014	Undisclosed	
4	CB	(Denmark)	Stadsgaard	40	EU	2012 (Winter)	14	0	2016	Free	
5	CB	(Iceland)	Ottesen	41	EU	2010	56	12	2013	DKK 7m	
6	CM	(Brazil)	Claudemir	37	Non-EU	2010	79	7	2015	DKK 7m	
7	CM	(Denmark)	Bergvold	41	EU	2010	111	9	2013	Free	
7	CF	(Norway)	Abdellaoue	37	EU	2012 (Winter)	12	3	2016	Undisclosed	
8	CM	(Norway)	Grindheim	42	EU	2011	45	0	2014	DKK 6m	
9	CF	(Denmark)	Nordstrand	42	EU	2007	129	41	2012	DKK 15m	
11	LW	(Brazil)	Santin	44	Non-EU	2008	161	64	2013	DKK 15m	
12	CB	(Sweden)	Larsson	41	EU	2008	37	0	2013	DKK 15m	
13	LW	(Senegal)	Diouf	39	EU	2011	34	6	2015	DKK 18m	
14	SS	(Senegal)	N'Doye	40	EU	2009 (Winter)	150	83	2014	DKK 15m	
15	RB	(Denmark)	Thomsen	43	EU	2011	17	0	2013	Free	
16	CM	(Denmark)	T. Kristensen	42	EU	2008	145	5	2014	Undisclosed	
17	CB	(Iceland)	Sigurðsson	39	EU	2011	38	1	2015	DKK 6m	
18	CF	(Denmark)	Zohore	31	EU	2010	23	1	?	Youth system	
19	LB	(Costa Rica)	Oviedo	35	Non-EU	2010	36	1	2013	Undisclosed	
20	AM	(Denmark)	Vingaard	40	EU	2009 (Winter)	114	21	2012	DKK 8m	
21	GK	(Sweden)	Wiland (VC)	44	EU	2009 (Winter)	125	0	2014	DKK 8m	
22	LW	(Denmark)	Absalonsen	40	EU	2011	16	0	2013	Free	
23	AM	(Denmark)	Frederiksen	36	EU	2010	4	2	2013	DKK 2m	
24	AM	(Denmark)	Toutouh	33	EU	2011	4	0	2014	Free	
25	CB	(Denmark)	Zanka (captain)	35	EU	2007	142	10	2012	Undisclosed	
26	RB	(Costa Rica)	Gamboa	35	Non-EU	2011	2	0	2015	Undisclosed	
27	CM	(Denmark)	Delaney	34	EU	2009	60	3	2014	Youth system	
28	DM	(Denmark) (Turkey)	Özdoğan	35	EU	2009	12	0	2012	Youth system	
30	RM	(Costa Rica)	Bolaños	41	Non-EU	2010	78	9	2014	DKK 7m	
33	CF	(Denmark)	Cornelius	32	EU	2012	2	0		Youth system	

- Last updated: 23 May
- Source: F.C. Copenhagen, players' Wikipedia articles, SJAT.com (for contract endings)
- Ordered by squad number.

=== Squad stats ===
				Total			UEFA Champions League		Danish Superliga		Danish Cup		UEFA Europa League	
No.	Pos.	Nat.	Name	Sts	App	Gls	App	Gls	App	Gls	App	Gls	App	Gls
22	GK	(Sweden)	Wiland	43	43		4		33				6	
2	RB	(Denmark)	Jacobsen	28	28				25		3			
5	CB	(Iceland)	Ottesen	35	36	9	4	2	24	5	2	2	6	
17	CB	(Iceland)	Sigurðsson	33	38	1	3		24	1	5		6	
3	DF	(Sweden)	Bengtsson	29	38		4		27		3		4	
30	RM	(Costa Rica)	Bolaños	43	47	5	5	2	32	3	4		6	
6	CM	(Brazil)	Claudemir	34	35	3	3		24	2	4	1	4	
8	CM	(Norway)	Grindheim	35	44		4		30		5		5	
19	LB	(Costa Rica)	Oviedo	26	30	1			20	1	6		4	
11	LW	(Brazil)	Santin	37	44	17	3		31	13	4	3	6	1
14	SS	(Senegal)	N'Doye	43	44	26	3	1	30	19	5	3	6	3
16	CM	(Denmark)	T. Kristensen	24	36	1	2		25	1	5		4	
13	LW	(Senegal)	Diouf	21	33	6	4		18	4	6	2	5	
9	CF	(Denmark)	Nordstrand	10	29	4	3		18	3	4		4	1
27	CM	(Denmark)	Delaney	22	27	1	3		19	1	1		4	
20	AM	(Denmark)	Vingaard	7	18				13		3		2	
15	RB	(Denmark)	Thomsen	16	17		3		7		2		5	
25	CB	(Denmark)	Zanka	15	17		4		11		2			
4	CB	(Denmark)	Stadsgaard	14	14				11		3			
22	LW	(Denmark)	Absalonsen	3	13		4		6		1		2	
7	CF	(Norway)	Abdellaoue	4	12	3			9	2	3	1		
1	GK	(Denmark)	K. Christensen	6	6						6			
7	CM	(Denmark)	Bergvold	2	6				3		2		1	
12	CB	(Sweden)	Larsson	3	5				4		1			
24	AM	(Denmark)	Toutouh	1	4				3		1			
26	RB	(Costa Rica)	Gamboa	2	2						1		1	
33	CF	(Denmark)	Cornelius		2				2					
18	CF	(Denmark)	Zohore		1						1			
23	AM	(Denmark)	Frederiksen											
28	DM	(Denmark) (Turkey)	Özdoğan											

Last updated: 23 May
Source: FCK.dk
Ordered by Starting 11 then appearances
0 shown as blank

=== Players in / out ===
==== In ====
No.	Pos.	Nat.	Name	Age	EU	Moving from	Type	Transfer window	Ends	Transfer fee	Source
9	CF	(Denmark)	Nordstrand	28	EU	Nordsjælland	End of loan	Summer	2012	n/a	
23	AM	(Denmark)	Frederiksen	21	EU	SønderjyskE	End of loan	Summer	2013	n/a	
19	LB	(Costa Rica)	Oviedo	21	Non-EU	Nordsjælland	End of loan	Summer	2013	n/a	
15	RB	(Denmark)	Thomsen	29	EU	SønderjyskE	Transfer	Summer	2013	Free	FCK.dk
17	CB	(Iceland)	Sigurðsson	25	EU	IFK Göteborg (Sweden)	Transfer	Summer	2015	DKK 6,000,000	FCK.dk
8	CM	(Norway)	Grindheim	27	EU	Heerenveen (Netherlands)	Transfer	Summer	2014	DKK 5,600,000	FCK.dk
13	CF	(Senegal)	Diouf	25	EU	Molde (Norway)	Transfer	Summer	2015	DKK 18,000,000	FCK.dk
24	AM	(Denmark)	Toutouh	18	EU	Hvidovre IF	Transfer	Summer	2014	Free	FCK.dk
26	RB	(Costa Rica)	Gamboa	21	Non-EU	Fredrikstad (Norway)	Transfer	Summer	2015	Undisclosed	FCK.dk
12	CB	(Sweden)	Larsson	27	EU	Helsingborgs IF (Sweden)	End of loan	Summer	2013	n/a	
2	RB	(Denmark)	Jacobsen	31	EU	West Ham United (England)	Transfer	Summer	2011	Free	FCK.dk
4	CB	(Denmark)	Stadsgaard	26	EU	Málaga (Spain)	Transfer	Winter	2016	Free	FCK.dk
7	CF	(Norway)	Abdellaoue	23	EU	Vålerenga (Norway)	Transfer	Winter	2016	Free	FCK.dk

==== Out ====
No.	Pos.	Nat.	Name	Age	EU	Moving to	Type	Transfer window	Transfer fee	Source
10	LW	(Denmark)	Grønkjær	33	EU		Retired	Summer	n/a	FCK.dk
2	RB	(Czech Republic)	Pospěch	32	EU	Mainz 05 (Germany)	Contract ended	Summer	Free	Mainz05.de
15	CB	(Sweden)	Antonsson	30	EU	Bologna (Italy)	Contract ended	Summer	n/a	BolognaFC.it
17	LB	(Sweden)	Wendt	25	EU	Borussia Mönchengladbach (Germany)	Contract ended	Summer	n/a	Borussia.de
29	RB	(Denmark)	Jensen	22	EU	Bodø/Glimt (Norway)	Contract ended	Summer	n/a	
24	CB	(Netherlands)	Hooiveld	28	EU	Celtic (Scotland)	End of loan	Summer	n/a	
8	CM	(Denmark)	Kvist	26	EU	VfB Stuttgart (Germany)	Transfer	Summer	DKK 35,000,000	VfB.de
28	CB	(Denmark) (Turkey)	Özdoğan	21	EU		Mutual agreement	Winter	n/a	FCK.dk
7	CM	(Denmark)	Bergvold	27	EU	Lyngby Boldklub	Loan	Winter	n/a	Lyngby-Boldklub.dk
23	CB	(Denmark)	Frederiksen	26	EU	Vejle Kolding	Loan	Winter	n/a	VejleBoldklubKolding.dk
15	RB	(Denmark)	Thomsen	29	EU	Randers FC	Transfer	Winter	Undisclosed	RandersFC.dk
18	ST	(Denmark)	Zohore	18	EU	Fiorentina (Italy)	Transfer	Winter	DKK 6,000,000	ViolaChannel.tv
22	LW	(Denmark)	Absalonsen	26	EU	Horsens	Loan	Winter	n/a	ACHorsens.dk

Last updated: 31 January

== Club ==
=== Coaching staff ===
Position	Staff
Manager	(Sweden) Roland Nilsson (until 9 January)
Manager	(Denmark) Carsten V. Jensen (from 9 January)
Assistant manager	(Denmark) Johan Lange
Assistant manager	(Sweden) Martin Pringle
Goalkeeping coach	(Denmark) Per Wind
Fitness coach	(Denmark) Anders Storskov
A+ coach	(Denmark) Morten Grahn

Last updated: 9 January
Source: F.C. Copenhagen

=== Kit ===
Supplier: Kappa
Sponsor(s): Carlsberg

Source: FCK.dk

=== Other information ===
Chairman	(Denmark) Hans Munk Nielsen
Sport director	(Denmark) Carsten V. Jensen
Ground (capacity and dimensions)	Parken (38,065 / 105x68 m)

Updated to match played 10 June
Source: F.C. Copenhagen and Parken Stadium

== Competitions ==
=== Overall ===
Competition	Started round	Current position / round	Final position / round	First match	Last match
Danish Superliga	—	—	2nd	17 July	23 May
UEFA Champions League	Third qualifying round	—	Play-off round	27 July	24 August
Danish Cup	Third round	—	Final	21 September	17 May
UEFA Europa League	Group stage	—	Group stage	15 September	15 December

Updated to match played 23 May
Source: Competitions

=== Danish Superliga ===
==== Classification ====
Pos	Team	Pld	W	D	L	GF	GA	GD	Pts	Qualification or relegation
1	Nordsjælland (C)	33	21	5	7	49	22	+27	68	Qualification to Champions League group stage
2	Copenhagen	33	19	9	5	55	26	+29	66	Qualification to Champions League third qualifying round
3	Midtjylland	33	17	7	9	50	40	+10	58	Qualification to Europa League play-off round (Note: Because 2011–12 Danish Cup winners Copenhagen qualified for the Champions League, and runners-up Horsens qualified for the Europa League through league position, the distribution of the Europa League spots reverted to league positions.)
4	Horsens	33	17	6	10	53	39	+14	57	Qualification to Europa League third qualifying round
5	AGF	33	12	12	9	47	40	+7	48	Qualification to Europa League second qualifying round

Source: Danish Football Association
Rules for classification: 1) points; 2) goal difference; 3) number of goals scored.
(C) Champions

==== Results summary ====
Overall								Home						Away					
Pld	W	D	L	GF	GA	GD	Pts	W	D	L	GF	GA	GD	W	D	L	GF	GA	GD
33	19	9	5	55	26	+29	66	11	5	1	30	12	+18	8	4	4	25	14	+11

Last updated: 23 May.

==== Results by round ====
Round	1	2	3	4	5	6	7	8	9	10	11	12	13	14	15	16	17	18	19	20	21	22	23	24	25	26	27	28	29	30	31	32	33
Ground	A	H	H	A	H	A	H	A	H	A	H	A	H	A	H	A	H	H	A	H	H	A	A	H	A	A	H	H	A	H	A	A	H
Result	W	D	W	W	W	W	W	W	W	W	D	L	L	W	W	L	W	D	D	W	D	D	W	W	D	W	W	W	L	D	D	L	W

Updated to match(es) played on 23 May. Source: Competitive Matches
A = Away; H = Home; W = Win; D = Draw; L = Loss

=== UEFA Champions League ===
==== Third qualifying round ====
Team 1	Agg.	Team 2	1st leg	2nd leg
Copenhagen (Denmark)	3-0	(Republic of Ireland) Shamrock Rovers	1-0	2-0

Last updated: 2 August.
Source: UEFA Champions League

==== Play-off round ====
Team 1	Agg.	Team 2	1st leg	2nd leg
Copenhagen (Denmark)	2-5	(Czech Republic) Viktoria Plzeň	1-3	1-2

Last updated: 24 August.
Source: UEFA Champions League

==== Results summary ====
Overall								Home						Away					
Pld	W	D	L	GF	GA	GD	Pts	W	D	L	GF	GA	GD	W	D	L	GF	GA	GD
4	2	0	2	5	5	0	6	1	0	1	2	3	−1	1	0	1	3	2	+1

Last updated: 24 August.

=== UEFA Europa League ===
==== Group B ====
===== Classification =====
Pos	Team	Pld	W	D	L	GF	GA	GD	Pts	Qualification	SL	HAN	COP	VP
1	(Belgium) Standard Liège	6	4	2	0	9	1	+8	14	Advance to knockout phase	—	2–0	3–0	0–0
2	(Germany) Hannover 96	6	3	2	1	9	7	+2	11	Advance to knockout phase	0–0	—	2–2	3–1
3	(Denmark) Copenhagen	6	1	2	3	5	9	−4	5		0–1	1–2	—	1–0
4	(Ukraine) Vorskla Poltava	6	0	2	4	4	10	−6	2		1–3	1–2	1–1	—

Source: Soccerway

===== Results by round =====
Round	1	2	3	4	5	6
Ground	H	A	A	H	A	H
Result	W	L	D	L	D	L

Updated to match(es) played on 15 December. Source: UEFA Europa League
A = Away; H = Home; W = Win; D = Draw; L = Loss

==== Results summary ====
Overall								Home						Away					
Pld	W	D	L	GF	GA	GD	Pts	W	D	L	GF	GA	GD	W	D	L	GF	GA	GD
6	1	2	3	5	10	−5	5	1	0	2	2	4	−2	0	2	1	3	6	−3

Last updated: 15 December.

== Matches ==
=== Competitive ===
Game	Date	Tournament	Round	Ground	Opponent	Score^{1}	TV	Report
1	17 July	Danish Superliga	1	A	SønderjyskE	2 – 0	Canal 9	Report / Report link; Kick off / 16:00 CEST; Attendance / 4,875; Referee / Kenn Hansen; Copenhagen / SønderjyskE; Santin 15'; N'Doye 90' / Hedinsson (yellow card) 73'
2	23 July	Danish Superliga	2	H	OB	2 – 2	TV3+	Report / Report link; Kick off / 19:00 CEST; Attendance / 14,774; Referee / Lars Christoffersen; Copenhagen / OB; Ottesen 18'; Ottesen 40'; Bengtsson (yellow card) 42'; Zanka (yellow card) 78' / Mendy 14'; Johansson (yellow card) 21'; Mendy (yellow card) 31'; Utaka 63'; Sørensen (yellow card) 73'
3	27 July	UEFA Champions League	Third qualifying round	H	Shamrock Rovers (Republic of Ireland)	1 – 0	TV3+	Report / Report link; Kick off / 20:00 CEST; Attendance / 11,571; Referee / Pavle Radovanovic; Copenhagen / Shamrock Rovers; Ottesen 4' / Murray (yellow card) 89'
4	30 July	Danish Superliga	3	H	Nordsjælland	2 – 0	Canal 9	Report / Report link; Kick off / 19:00 CEST; Attendance / 11,076; Referee / Jakob Kehlet; Copenhagen / Nordsjælland; Nordstrand 16'; Delaney 90' / Beckmann (yellow card) 60'
5	2 August	UEFA Champions League	Third qualifying round	A (Republic of Ireland)	Shamrock Rovers (Republic of Ireland)	2 – 0	TV3+	Report / Report link; Kick off / 19:45 BST; Referee / Halis Özkahya; Copenhagen / Shamrock Rovers; N'Doye 42'; Bolaños 73' / McCormack (yellow card) 40'
6	7 August	Danish Superliga	4	A	HB Køge (Denmark)	4 – 2	Canal 9	Report / Report link; Kick off / 16:00 CEST; Attendance / 6,538; Referee / Jakob Kehlet; Copenhagen / HB Køge; Diouf 20'; Bengtsson (yellow card) 54'; Santin 63'; Nordstrand 82'; Claudemir 90' / A. Sørensen 47'; Rusin (yellow card) 50'; T. Sørensen (yellow card) 80'; Thomsen 83'
7	13 August	Danish Superliga	5	H	Midtjylland	2 – 0	TV3+	Report / Report link; Kick off / 19:00 CEST; Attendance / 12,218; Referee / Kenn Hansen; Copenhagen / Midtjylland; Grindheim (yellow card) 36'; N'Doye 74'; Zanka (yellow card) 89'; N'Doye 89' / Afriyie (yellow card) 55'
8	16 August	UEFA Champions League	Play-off round	H	Viktoria Plzeň (Czech Republic)	1 – 3	TV3+	Report / Report link; Kick off / 20:45 CEST; Attendance / 19,148; Referee / Martin Atkinson; Copenhagen / Viktoria Plzeň; Bolaños (yellow card) 46'; Ottesen 69'; Grindheim (yellow card) 85'; N'Doye (yellow card) 90'; Absalonsen (yellow card) 90' / Ottesen 52' (o.g.); Pilař 59'; Ďuriš (yellow card) 65'; Petržela (yellow card) 74'; Fillo 79'; Trapp (yellow card) 83'
9	20 August	Danish Superliga	6	A	Horsens	1 – 0	Canal 9	Report / Report link; Kick off / 19:00 CEST; Attendance / 6,880; Referee / Peter Rasmussen; Copenhagen / Horsens; Sigurðsson (yellow card) 42'; Santin 45' (pen.); Santin (yellow card) 58'; N'Doye (yellow card) 69'; Bergvold (yellow card) 89' / Spelmann (yellow card) 39'; Toft (yellow card) 42'; Jensen (yellow card) 90'
10	22 August	UEFA Champions League	Play-off round	AR (Czech Republic)	Viktoria Plzeň (Czech Republic)	1 – 2	TV3+	Report / Report link; Kick off / 20:45 CEST; Attendance / 19,350; Referee / Carlos Velasco Carballo; Copenhagen / Viktoria Plzeň; Bolaños 32'; Nordstrand (yellow card) 53'; Absalonsen (yellow card) 71'; Grindheim (yellow card) 82' / Limberský (yellow card) 20'; Jiráček (yellow card) 41'; Bakoš 67'; Ďuriš 90'
11	28 August	Danish Superliga	7	H	Silkeborg IF	2 – 1	Canal 9	Report / Report link; Kick off / 16:00 CEST; Attendance / 11,629; Referee / Anders Hermansen; Copenhagen / Silkeborg IF; Santin 14'; N'Doye 42'; Diouf (yellow card) 89'; Ottesen (yellow card) 90' / Pourié (yellow card) 45'; Svensson (yellow card) 53'; Flinta 66'
12	10 September	Danish Superliga	8	H	Lyngby Boldklub	1 – 0	Canal 9	Report / Report link; Kick off / 15:00 CEST; Attendance / 4,386; Referee / Henning Jensen; Copenhagen / Lyngby Boldklub; Santin 13'; Bolaños (yellow card) 47'; Oviedo (yellow card) 90' / Bertolt (yellow card) 59'; Cagara (yellow card) 67'
13	15 September	UEFA Europa League	Group stage	H	Vorskla (Ukraine)	1 – 0	TV3+	Report / Report link; Kick off / 19:00 CEST; Attendance / 10,420; Referee / Stanislav Todorov; Copenhagen / Vorskla; Nordstrand 54' (pen.); Kristensen (yellow card) 62'; Santin (yellow card) 85' / Bezus (yellow card) 13'; Kurilov (yellow card) 16'
14	18 September	Danish Superliga	9	H	AaB	2 – 0	TV3+	Report / Report link; Kick off / 18:00 CEST; Attendance / 15,245; Referee / Claus Bo Larsen; Copenhagen / AaB; Sigurðsson (yellow card) 77'; Sigurðsson 82'; N'Doye 88'; N'Doye (yellow card) 89' / Due (yellow card) 38'
15	21 September	Danish Cup	Third round	A	Vestsjælland (Denmark)	2 – 0	6'eren	Report / Report link; Kick off / 20:00 CEST; Referee / Michael Johansen; Copenhagen / Vestsjælland; Santin 33'; Santin 40'
16	24 September	Danish Superliga	10	A	Brøndby	2 – 1	TV3+	Report / Report link; Kick off / 15:00 CEST; Attendance / 15,695; Referee / Henning Jensen; Copenhagen / Brøndby; Ottesen (yellow card) 54'; N'Doye 59'; Santin 90'; Bolaños (yellow card) 90' / Thygesen 37'
17	29 September	UEFA Europa League	Group stage	A (Belgium)	Standard Liège (Belgium)	0 – 3	TV3+	Report / Report link; Kick off / 21:05 CEST; Referee / Anastassios Kakos; Copenhagen / Standard Liège; Claudemir (yellow card) 4'; Bengtsson (yellow card) 33'; Ottesen (yellow card) 34' / Kanu (yellow card) 27'; Seijas 57'; Van Damme (yellow card) 59'; Felipe 72'; Kanu 79'; Bolat (yellow card) 89'
18	2 October	Danish Superliga	11	H	AGF	1 – 1	TV3+	Report / Report link; Kick off / 18:00 CEST; Attendance / 25,651; Referee / Michael Svendsen; Copenhagen / AGF; N'Doye (yellow card) 11'; N'Doye 67' / Kure (yellow card) 57'; Jørgensen 90' (pen.)
19	17 October	Danish Superliga	12	A	Horsens	0 – 2	TV 2 Sport	Report / Report link; Kick off / 19:00 CEST; Attendance / 6,587; Referee / Claus Bo Larsen; Copenhagen / Horsens; Grindheim (yellow card) 31'; Ottesen (yellow card) 84' / Mehl 38'; Nøhr (yellow card) 41'; Gilberto 90'
20	20 October	UEFA Europa League	Group stage	A (Germany)	Hannover 96 (Germany)	2 – 2	TV3+	Report / Report link; Kick off / 21:05 CEST; Referee / Laurent Duhamel; Copenhagen / Hannover 96; N'Doye 67'; Grindheim (yellow card) 72'; Delaney (yellow card) 81'; Santin 89' / Pander 29'; Pinto 81'
21	24 October	Danish Superliga	13	H	Nordsjælland	1 – 3	TV 2 Sport	Report / Report link; Kick off / 19:00 CEST; Attendance / 16,863; Referee / Henning Jensen; Copenhagen / Nordsjælland; Kristensen (yellow card) 73'; N'Doye 81' / Christensen 22'; Mikkelsen 31'; Stokholm 66'; Mtiliga (yellow card) 67'; Stokholm (yellow card) 73'; Beckmann (yellow card) 78'
22	27 October	Danish Cup	Fourth round	A	Brøndby	3 – 0	6'eren	Report / Report link; Kick off / 20:00 CEST; Attendance / 13,076; Referee / Kenn Hansen; Copenhagen / Brøndby; N'Doye (yellow card) 15'; Diouf 37'; N'Doye 44'; Ottesen 52'; Oviedo (yellow card) 90' / Goodson (yellow card) 49'; Larsen (yellow card) 88'
23	30 October	Danish Superliga	14	A	OB	3 – 1	TV3+	Report / Report link; Kick off / 18:00 CET; Attendance / 8,228; Referee / Emil Laursen; Copenhagen / OB; Ottesen 45'; Santin 57'; Santin 71' / Falk 34'; Andreasen (yellow card) 61'
24	3 November	UEFA Europa League	Group stage	H	Hannover 96 (Germany)	1 – 2	TV3+	Report / Report link; Kick off / 19:00 CET; Attendance / 27,853; Referee / Eric Braamhaar; Copenhagen / Hannover 96; Oviedo (yellow card) 58'; N'Doue 66' / Pogatetz (yellow card) 45'; Schlaudraff 71'; Stindl 74'; Haggui (yellow card) 90'
25	6 November	Danish Superliga	15	H	Lyngby Boldklub	3 – 0	DR1	Report / Report link; Kick off / 16:00 CET; Attendance / 16,143; Referee / Jakob Kehlet; Copenhagen / Lyngby Boldklub; Santin (yellow card) 35'; N'Doye (yellow card) 64'; Claudemir 65'; Diouf 74'; Santin 90'
26	20 November	Danish Superliga	16	A	Brøndby	1 – 2	TV3+	Report / Report link; Kick off / 18:00 CET; Attendance / 10,803; Referee / Lars Christoffersen; Copenhagen / Brøndby; N'Doye (yellow card) 37'; N'Doye 41' / Goodson 18'; McGrath (yellow card) 19'; Ajilore (yellow card) 45'; Rasmussen 81'
27	24 November	Danish Cup	Fifth round	H	Nordsjælland	2 – 0	6'eren	Report / Report link; Kick off / 20:00 CET; Attendance / 9,012; Referee / Michael Johansen; Copenhagen / Nordsjælland; Ottesen 88'; Diouf 90' / Adu (yellow card) 44'; Parkhurst (yellow card) 49'; Okore (yellow card) 75'
28	27 November	Danish Superliga	17	H	HB Køge (Denmark)	2 – 1	Canal 9	Report / Report link; Kick off / 16:00 CET; Attendance / 7,653; Referee / Michael Tykgaard; Copenhagen / HB Køge; Diouf (yellow card) 72'; Santin 73' (pen.); Nordstrand 74' / Makienok 36'; Sørensen (yellow card) 71'; Kronborg (yellow card) 81'
29	30 November	UEFA Europa League	Group stage	A (Ukraine)	Vorskla (Ukraine)	1 – 1	TV3+	Report / Report link; Kick off / 22:05 EET; Referee / Alexey Kulbakov; Copenhagen / Vorskla; N'Doye 37' / N'Doye 31' (o.g.); Dallku (yellow card) 87'; Velychko (yellow card) 90'
30	4 December	Danish Superliga	18	A	AGF	0 – 0	TV3+	Report / Report link; Kick off / 18:00 CET; Attendance / 11,690; Referee / Michael Johansen; Copenhagen / AGF; / Lucena (yellow card) 54'; Jørgensen (yellow card) 70'
31	15 December	UEFA Europa League	Group stage	H	Standard Liège (Belgium)	0 – 1	TV3+	Report / Report link; Kick off / 19:00 CET; Attendance / 9,722; Referee / Hüseyin Göçek; Copenhagen / Standard Liège; Ottesen (yellow card) 87' / Goroux (yellow card) 25'; Batshuavi 37'
32	4 March	Danish Superliga	19	A	AaB	1 – 1	TV3+	Report / Report link; Kick off / CET; Attendance / 9,247; Referee / Michael Johansen; Copenhagen / AaB; Ottesen (yellow card) 90'; N'Doye 90+4' / Petersen (yellow card) 53'; Ahlmann (yellow card) 82'; Helenius 90+9'
33	11 March	Danish Superliga	20	H	SønderjyskE	2 – 0	Canal 9	Report / Report link; Kick off / 16:00 CET; Attendance / 24,151; Referee / Mads-Kristoffer Kristoffersen; Copenhagen / SønderjyskE; N'Doye 37'; Claudemir (yellow card) 47'; Vibe 64' (o.g.); Jacobsen (yellow card) 69' / Jónasson (yellow card) 37'; Hansen (yellow card) 40'; Christensen (yellow card) 40'; Bødker (yellow card) 78'
34	18 March	Danish Superliga	21	H	Midtjylland	0 – 0	TV3+	Report / Report link; Kick off / 18:00 CET; Attendance / 14,440; Referee / Michael Tykgaard; Copenhagen / Midtjylland; Stadsgaard (yellow card) 29' / Nworuh (yellow card) 28'; Sviatchenko (yellow card) 87'
35	25 March	Danish Superliga	22	A	Silkeborg IF	0 – 0	Canal 9	Report / Report link; Kick off / 16:00 CEST; Attendance / 6,107; Referee / Claus Bo Larsen; Copenhagen / Silkeborg IF; Ottesen (yellow card) 10'; Bolaños (yellow card) 55'; Delaney (yellow card) 58' / Pourié (yellow card) 86' (yellow-red card) 90'
36	1 April	Danish Superliga	23	A	Lyngby Boldklub	3 – 1	Canal 9	Report / Report link; Kick off / 16:00 CEST; Attendance / 4,268; Referee / Lars Christoffersen; Copenhagen / Lyngby Boldklub; N'Doye (yellow card) 28'; N'Doye 45'; Santin 76'; N'Doye 88' / Krabbe (yellow card) 21'; Brandrup (yellow card) 26'; Mortensen 83'
37	5 April	Danish Superliga	24	H	Brøndby	3 – 1	TV3+	Report / Report link; Kick off / 18:00 CEST; Attendance / 22,165; Referee / Jakob Kehlet; Copenhagen / Brøndby; Diouf 41'; N'Doye 51'; N'Doye (yellow card) 58'; N'Doye 90' / Makienok 42'
38	9 April	Danish Superliga	25	A	AGF	0 – 0	TV3+	Report / Report link; Kick off / 18:00 CEST; Attendance / 10,591; Referee / Peter Rasmussen; Copenhagen / AGF; Kristensen (yellow card) 34'; Oviedo (yellow card) 82'; Sigurðsson (yellow card) 90' / Povlsen (yellow card) 72'
39	15 April	Danish Superliga	26	A	HB Køge (Denmark)	5 – 0	Canal 9	Report / Report link; Kick off / 16:00 CEST; Referee / Anders Hermansen; Copenhagen / HB Køge; Kristensen 6'; Kristensen (yellow card) 32'; Santin 59'; Ottesen 71'; Abdellaoue 88'; Diouf 88' / Hansen (yellow card) 22'; Runsewe (red card) 31'
40	18 April	Danish Cup	Semi-finals	H	SønderjyskE	1 – 0	6'eren	Report / Report link; Kick off / 18:00 CEST; Attendance / 6,099; Referee / Mads-Kristoffer Kristoffersen; Copenhagen / SønderjyskE; Abdellaoue 4'; Sigurðsson (yellow card) 12' / Héðinsson (yellow card) 21'; Jónasson (yellow card) 58'; Bechmann (yellow card) 83'
41	22 April	Danish Superliga	27	H	Horsens	2 – 1	Canal 9	Report / Report link; Kick off / 16:00 CEST; Attendance / 12,568; Referee / Kenn Hansen; Copenhagen / Horsens; Santin 43' (pen.); Oviedo 71'; Claudemir (yellow card) 75' / Lodberg (yellow card) 42'; Fagerberg 66'; Drachmann (yellow card) 90'
42	25 April	Danish Cup	Semi-finals	A	SønderjyskE	3 – 4	6'eren	Report / Report link; Kick off / 18:00 CEST; Attendance / 3,758; Referee / Jakob Kehlet; Copenhagen / SønderjyskE; Gamboa (yellow card) 11'; N'Doye 13'; Oviedo (yellow card) 19'; N'Doye 53'; Zanka (yellow card) 70'; Santin 84' (pen.); Santin (yellow card) 85' / Héðinsson 16'; Hansen (yellow card) 19'; Paulsen 28'; Antipas 43'; Antipas 56'; Østli (red card) 84'; Bødker (yellow card) 88'
43	29 April	Danish Superliga	28	H	AaB	3 – 0	TV3+	Report / Report link; Kick off / 18:00 CEST; Attendance / 13,598; Referee / Anders Poulsen; Copenhagen / AaB; Bolaños 7'; N'Doye 17'; Bolaños 58'
44	2 April	Danish Superliga	29	A	Nordsjælland	0 – 1	TV3+	Report / Report link; Kick off / 20:00 CEST; Attendance / 9,943; Referee / Michael Tykgaard; Copenhagen / Nordsjælland; Bolaños (yellow card) 30'; Stadsgaard (yellow card) 82' / Beckmann 54'; Christensen (yellow card) 82'
45	6 May	Danish Superliga	30	H	OB	1 – 1	TV3+	Report / Report link; Kick off / 18:00 CEST; Attendance / 14,343; Referee / Kenn Hansen; Copenhagen / OB; Grindheim (yellow card) 70'; N'Doye 82' (pen.) / Traoré (yellow card) 44'; Skoubo 62'; Møller Christensen (yellow card) 81'; Kadrii (yellow card) 81'
46	13 May	Danish Superliga	31	A	SønderjyskE	2 – 2	Canal 9	Report / Report link; Kick off / 16:00 CEST; Attendance / 4,806; Referee / Peter Rasmussen; Copenhagen / SønderjyskE; Bolaños 76'; Ottesen 85'; Bengtsson (yellow card) 90' / Héðinsson 42'; Vibe 50'; Hansen (yellow card) 79'
47	17 May	Danish Cup	Final	N	Horsens	1 – 0	6'eren	Report / Report link; Kick off / 18:00 CEST; Attendance / 21,963; Referee / Lars Christoffersen; Copenhagen / Horsens; Claudemir 42'; Claudemir (yellow card) 85'
48	20 May	Danish Superliga	32	A	Midtjylland	0 – 1	DR2	Report / Report link; Kick off / 16:00 CEST; Attendance / 10,289; Referee / Jakob Kehlet; Copenhagen / Midtjylland; Kristensen (yellow card) 21'; Sigurðsson (yellow card) 42'; N'Doye (yellow card) 42'; Ottesen (yellow card) 65'; Cornelius (yellow card) 90' / Lauridsen (yellow card) 20'; Igboun (yellow card) 39'; Uzochukwu (yellow card) 40'; Sviatchenko (yellow card) 50'; Olsen 66'
49	23 May	Danish Superliga	33	H	Silkeborg IF	2 – 1	TV3+	Report / Report link; Kick off / 20:00 CEST; Attendance / 19,974; Referee / Anders Hermansen; Copenhagen / Silkeborg IF; Abdellaoue 18'; N'Doye 61' / Pedersen (yellow card) 52'; Pourié 69'

Last updated: 23 May
Source: FCK.dk
^{1}F.C. Copenhagen goals come first.
National flags for Ground and Opponent columns are only shown when different from that of F.C. Copenhagen.
M = Match; Ground: H = Home, A = Away, N = Neutral, HR = Home replacement, AR = Away replacement.
