= Makienok =

Makienok is a surname. Notable people with the surname include:

- Ibi Makienok (born 1975), Danish actress, TV-host and singer
- Simon Makienok (born 1990), Danish footballer
