= 2011–12 HB Køge season =

HB Køge
2011–12 season
- Chairman: Henrik N. Andersen
- Manager: Aurelijus Skarbalius; Tommy Møller Nielsen
- Top goalscorer: League: Nicolaj Madsen (5); All: Nicolaj Madsen (6)
- Highest home attendance: 6,538 (vs FCK, 7 August 2011)
- Lowest home attendance: 2,021 (vs AaB, 27 August 2011)
- Average home league attendance: 3,045

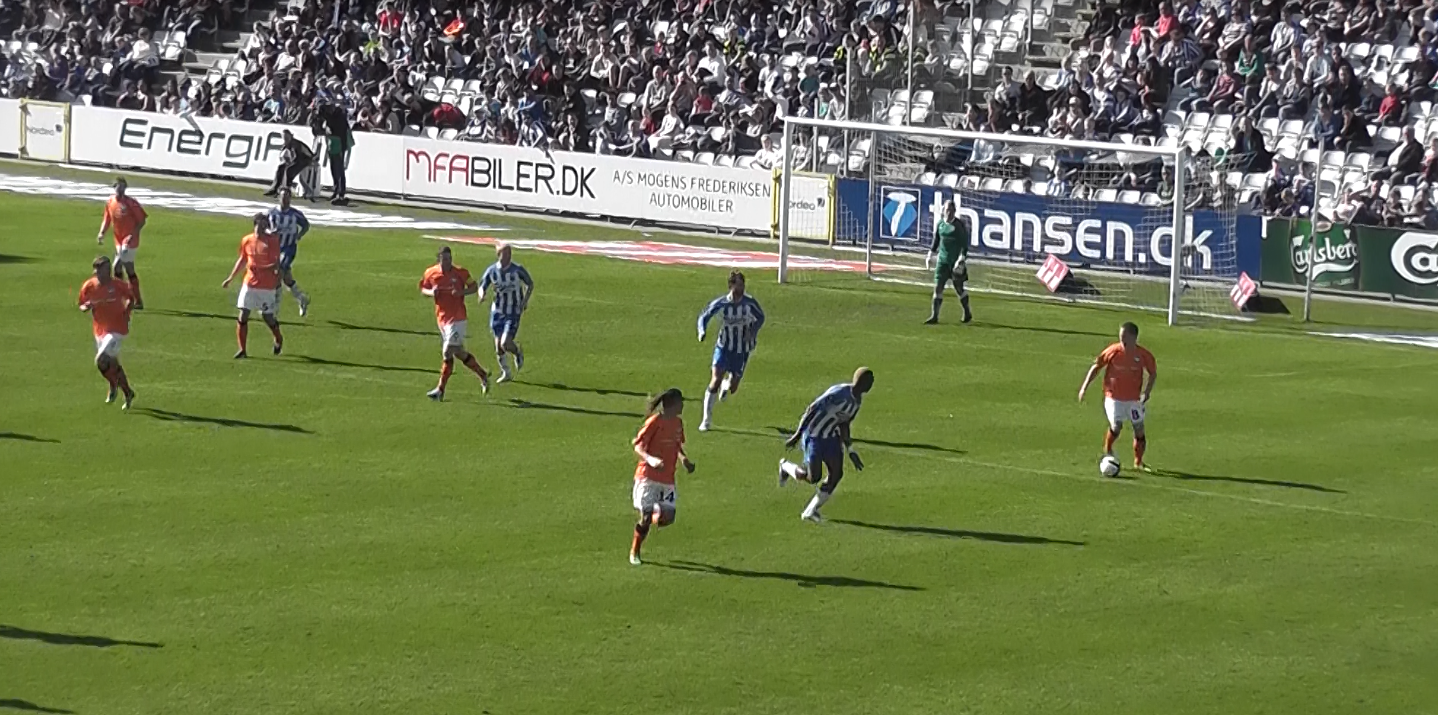
OB 2-4 HB Køge

This article shows statistics of individual players for the football club HB Køge. It also lists all matches that HB Køge will play in the 2011–12 season.

== Players ==
=== Squad information ===
This section show the squad as currently, considering all players who are confirmedly moved in and out.

N	Pos.	Nat.	Name	Age	EU	Since	App	Goals	Ends	Transfer fee	Notes
1	GK	(Denmark)	Morten Haastrup Jensen	36	EU	2009	56	0	Undisclosed	Youth system	
2	LB	(Denmark)	Andreas Sørensen	41	EU	2011	21	2	Undisclosed	Free	
3	CM	(Denmark)	Lasse Kronborg	39	EU	2009	69	10	Undisclosed	Undisclosed	
4	CB	(Denmark)	Thomas Guldborg Christensen (C)	41	EU	2009	64	0	Undisclosed	Undisclosed	
5	CB	(Denmark)	Stefan Hansen	36	EU	2009	55	1	Undisclosed	Undisclosed	
6	CM	(Denmark)	Nicolaj Madsen	37	EU	2009	74	11	Undisclosed	Youth system	
7	AM	(Denmark)	Bo Storm	38	EU	2010	58	10	Undisclosed	Undisclosed	
8	CM	(Denmark)	Marcel Rømer	34	EU	2009	63	2	Undisclosed	Youth system	
10	CM	(Denmark)	Mads Laudrup	36	EU	2009	26	2	Undisclosed	Undisclosed	
11	CF	(Nigeria)	Adeola Runsewe	35	Non-EU	2011	21	1	Undisclosed	Free	
12	RB	(Denmark)	Kristian Geertsen	34	EU	2010	25	1	Undisclosed	Youth system	
14	AM	(Denmark)	Lee Rochester Sørensen	31	EU	2009	19	2	Undisclosed	Youth system	
15	CB	(United States)	Brad Rusin	39	Non-EU	2011	16	2	Undisclosed	Free	
16	RB	(Denmark)	Anders Nielsen	39	EU	2012	0	0	Undisclosed	Free	
17	RB	(Denmark)	Thomas Sørensen	41	EU	2009	77	1	Undisclosed	Undisclosed	
19	RB	(Denmark)	Ronnie Bendtsen	41	EU	2011	13	0	Undisclosed	Free	
20	RM	(Denmark)	Martin Christensen	37	EU	2011	29	2	Undisclosed	Free	
21	CM	(Denmark)	Patrick Hansen	34	EU	2009	3	0	Undisclosed	Youth system	
22	RW	(Brazil)	Fabinho	48	Non-EU	2009	63	16	Undisclosed	Undisclosed	
23	CF	(Denmark)	Tobias Thomsen	32	EU	2009	10	1	Undisclosed	Youth system	
24	LB	(Denmark)	Simon Richter	40	EU	2011	12	0	Undisclosed	Free	
26	CM	(Denmark)	Marc Rochester Sørensen	32	EU	2009	19	3	Undisclosed	Youth system	
28	CM	(Denmark)	Simon Sinkjær	32	EU	2010	0	0	Undisclosed	Youth system	
29	GK	(Denmark)	Frederik Due	33	EU	2009	0	0	Undisclosed	Youth system	
30	CB	(Denmark)	Nicolai Riise Madsen	33	EU	2009	1	0	Undisclosed	Youth system	

- Last updated: 11 March
- Source: Official Club Website, players' Wikipedia articles, Wikipedia articles in general
- Ordered by squad number.
