= 2009 Carolina RailHawks FC season =

This is a recap of the Carolina RailHawks 2009 season. The RailHawks are an American soccer team which played their third season in the USL First Division in 2009.

== Players ==
=== Roster ===
As of July 26, 2009 Note: Flags indicate national team as defined under FIFA eligibility rules; some limited exceptions apply. Players may hold more than one non-FIFA nationality.

No.	Pos.	Nation	Player
1	GK	(Australia) AUS	Caleb Patterson-Sewell
2	DF	(Scotland) SCO	Greg Shields
3	MF	(Puerto Rico) PUR	Kupono Low
4	DF	(United States) USA	Jeremy Tolleson
5	DF	(United States) USA	Devon McKenney
6	MF	(United States) USA	Josh Gardner
7	MF	(United States) USA	Luke Kreamalmeyer
8	MF	(England) ENG	Matthew Watson
9	FW	(Sierra Leone) SLE	Sallieu Bundu
10	MF	(United States) USA	Brian Plotkin
11	MF	(United States) USA	Daniel Paladini
12	DF	(United States) USA	Caleb Norkus
13	DF	(United States) USA	Mark Schulte

No.	Pos.	Nation	Player
15	DF	(United States) USA	John Gilkerson
16	FW	(Turks and Caicos Islands) TCA	Gavin Glinton
17	MF	(Zimbabwe) ZIM	Joseph Kabwe
19	FW	(Ivory Coast) CIV	Hamed Diallo
20	DF	(Guyana) GUY	Gregory Richardson
22	DF	(United States) USA	Jack Stewart
23	GK	(United States) USA	Eric Reed
24	DF	(United States) USA	Brad Rusin
25	DF	(United States) USA	Amir Lowery
28	FW	(England) ENG	John Cunliffe
33	FW	(Ukraine) UKR	Andriy Budnyy

Transfers:

- OUT: Brian Levey, released (7/3/2008)
- IN: Gregory Richardson, free agent (7/9/2009); Greg Shields, free agent (7/17/2009)

=== Staff ===
- (Scotland) Martin Rennie - Coach
- (Scotland) Brian Irvine - Assistant Coach
- (United States) Richard Huxford - Assistant Coach
- (United States) Paul Coleman - Equipment Manager
- (United States) Lizy Coleman - Head Trainer
- (United States) Ginny Williams - Assistant Trainer
- (United States) Amy Arundale - Student Trainer
- (United States) Jonathan Chappell - Physician
- (United States) Todd Staker - Chiropractor

== Schedule ==
Date	Opponent	Location	Time (ET)	Result
March 14	New England Revolution (Exhibition)	WakeMed Soccer Park, Cary, NC	7:00 PM	1-0 W
March 27	CD Olimpia (Exhibition)	WakeMed Soccer Park, Cary, NC	8:00 PM	2-1 L
April 4	Richmond Kickers (Exhibition)	University of Richmond Stadium, Richmond, VA	7:00 PM	1-0 L
April 11	Minnesota Thunder	WakeMed Soccer Park, Cary, NC	7:00 PM	2-1 W
April 14	Wilmington Hammerheads (Exhibition)	Legion Stadium, Wilmington, NC	7:00 PM	2-0 W
April 18	Rochester Rhinos	WakeMed Soccer Park, Cary, NC	7:00 PM	1-0 W
April 26	Minnesota Thunder	WakeMed Soccer Park, Cary, NC	2:00 PM	1-0 W
April 30	Portland Timbers	PGE Park, Portland, OR	10:00 PM	0-0 D
May 2	Portland Timbers	PGE Park, Portland, OR	10:00 PM	0-2 L
May 9	Charleston Battery ^^	WakeMed Soccer Park, Cary, NC	7:00 PM	1-2 L
May 16	Miami FC	Tropical Park Stadium, Miami, FL	8:00 PM	2-0 W
May 22	Cleveland City Stars	Krenzler Field, Cleveland, OH	8:00 PM	3-0 W
May 24	Austin Aztex	Nelson Field, Austin, TX	7:00 PM	1-0 W
May 29	Cleveland City Stars	WakeMed Soccer Park, Cary, NC	8:00 PM	1-0 W
June 9	Richmond Kickers ^^^	WakeMed Soccer Park, Cary, NC	7:00 PM	2-1 W
June 11	Portland Timbers	WakeMed Soccer Park, Cary, NC	7:00 PM	0-0 D
June 13	Minnesota Thunder	James Griffin Stadium, St. Paul, MN	8:05 PM	0-2 L
June 16	Wilmington Hammerheads ^^^	WakeMed Soccer Park, Cary, NC	7:00 PM	3-3 (2-4 pk) L
June 19	Austin Aztex	Nelson Field, Austin, TX	8:30 PM	1-1 D
June 27	Puerto Rico Islanders	WakeMed Soccer Park, Cary, NC	7:00 PM	1-2 L
June 30	Panama (Exhibition)	WakeMed Soccer Park, Cary, NC	7:00 PM	1-0 W
July 3	Wilmington Hammerheads (Exhibition)	WakeMed Soccer Park, Cary, NC	7:00 PM	3-0 W
July 11	Charleston Battery ^^	Blackbaud Stadium, Charleston, SC	7:30 PM	1-0 W
July 17	Vancouver Whitecaps	WakeMed Soccer Park, Cary, NC	8:00 PM	2-1 W
July 18	Tecos (Exhibition)	WakeMed Soccer Park, Cary, NC	8:00 PM	2-1 W
July 24	Charleston Battery	Blackbaud Stadium, Charleston, SC	8:00 PM	1-2 L
July 26	Miami FC	WakeMed Soccer Park, Cary, NC	2:00 PM	4-0 W
August 1	Austin Aztex	WakeMed Soccer Park, Cary, NC	7:00 PM	3-0 W
August 5	Rochester Rhinos	Rochester Rhinos Stadium, Rochester, NY	7:00 PM	1-0 W
August 8	Cleveland City Stars	WakeMed Soccer Park Cary, NC	7:00 PM	2-0 W
August 15	Vancouver Whitecaps	Swangard Stadium, Vancouver, BC	10:00 PM	0-0 D
August 18	Vancouver Whitecaps	WakeMed Soccer Park Cary, NC	7:00 PM	1-1 D
August 22	Rochester Rhinos	Rochester Rhinos Stadium, Rochester, NY	7:35 PM	0-0 D
August 26	Miami FC	WakeMed Soccer Park Cary, NC	7:00 PM	9-0 W
August 30	Montreal Impact	Stade Saputo Montréal, Quebec	3:45 PM	1-1 T
September 2	Montreal Impact	Stade Saputo Montréal, Quebec	7:45 PM	0-1 L
September 8	Puerto Rico Islanders	Estadio Juan Ramón Loubriel, Bayamon, PR	8:00 PM	0-2 L
September 12	Puerto Rico Islanders	WakeMed Soccer Park Cary, NC	7:00 PM	2-1 W
September 18	Montreal Impact	WakeMed Soccer Park Cary, NC	7:00 PM	2-0 W

^ Televised nationally on Fox Soccer Channel

^^ Southern Derby fixtures

^^^ U.S. Open Cup fixtures
