= 2011 Carolina RailHawks FC season =

Carolina RailHawks
2011 season
- Owner: Traffic Sports USA
- Manager: Martin Rennie
- Stadium: WakeMed Soccer Park
- NASL: 1st
- Playoffs: TBD
- U.S. Open Cup: Denied entry
- Top goalscorer: (Malta) Etienne Barbara (12 goals)
- Highest home attendance: 4,690 vs. MTL (Jul 3)
- Lowest home attendance: 1,181 vs. EDM (Apr 20)
- Average home league attendance: 2,733
Home colors	Away colors

The 2011 Carolina RailHawks FC season was the fifth season of existence for the Carolina RailHawks FC. It was their fifth-consecutive year in the second flight of American soccer, as well as their inaugural season in the new North American Soccer League.

== Match results ==
=== Preseason ===
March 4, 2011 Preseason	Wake Forest Demon Deacons	0 - 2	Carolina RailHawks	Winston-Salem, North Carolina
7:00 p.m.		Report	Bundu 52', 73'	Stadium: Spry Stadium

March 9, 2011 Preseason	Carolina RailHawks	2 - 0	UNC Wilmington Seahawks	Cary, North Carolina
4:00 p.m.		Report		Stadium: WakeMed Soccer Park

March 11, 2011 Preseason	CASL Elite	2 - 4	Carolina RailHawks	Raleigh, North Carolina
		Report		Stadium: WRAL Soccer Center

March 19, 2011 Preseason	Carolina RailHawks	v	Charleston Battery	Cary, North Carolina
				Stadium: WakeMed Soccer Park

March 23, 2011 Preseason	Carolina RailHawks	v	Charlotte Eagles	Cary, North Carolina
3:00 p.m.				Stadium: WakeMed Soccer Park

March 26, 2011 Preseason	Richmond Kickers	v	Carolina RailHawks	Richmond, Virginia
				Stadium: City Stadium

March 29, 2011 Preseason	Carolina RailHawks	v	North Carolina Tar Heels

April 1, 2011 Preseason	Carolina RailHawks	1 - 0	Wilmington Hammerheads	Cary, North Carolina
	Russell 29'	Report		Stadium: WakeMed Soccer Park

=== Regular season ===
Date	Opponent	Venue	Result	Attendance	Scorers	Ref.
April 9, 2011	Puerto Rico Islanders	H	1–2	3,144	Barbara	
April 16, 2011	Montréal Impact	H	2–1	1,219	Barbara, Campos	
April 20, 2011	FC Edmonton	H	2–0	1,181	Barbara, Zimmerman	
April 30, 2011	NSC Minnesota Stars	A	1–1	1,672	Barbara	
May 7, 2011	Tampa Bay Rowdies	A	3–1	4,062	Barbara (2), Farber	
May 11, 2011	Fort Lauderdale Strikers	H	4–2	2,109	Campos (2), Barbara, Russell	
May 14, 2011	Montréal Impact	A	2–1	11,907	Barbara (2)	
May 21, 2011	Puerto Rico Islanders	H	3–0	3,498	Barbara (2), Campos	
May 28, 2011	Atlanta Silverbacks	H	2–0	3,015	Campos, Russell	
June 4, 2011	FC Tampa Bay	A	2–1	2,688	Barbara, Zimmerman	
June 10, 2011	FC Edmonton	A	1–0	3,500	Watson	
June 18, 2011	FC Tampa Bay	H	3–1	4,041	Watson, Barbara, Russell	
June 25, 2011	Atlanta Silverbacks	A	5–1		Barbara, Zimmerman (2), Nurse, Rusin	
July 3, 2011	Montreal Impact	H	2-0	4,690	Campos, Zimmerman	
July 9, 2011	NSC Minnesota Stars	A	0–1			
July 13, 2011	FC Edmonton	A	1–1		Farber	
July 23, 2011	FC Edmonton	H	4–1		Campos (2), Hamilton (OG), Barbara	
July 30, 2011	Atlanta Silverbacks	H	1–0		Barbara	
August 6, 2011	Fort Lauderdale Strikers	A	1–2		Campos	
August 13, 2011	Puerto Rico Islanders	A	0–2			
August 17, 2011	NSC Minnesota Stars	H	1–1	3,160	Campos	
August 20, 2011	Fort Lauderdale Strikers	H	2–0	4,629	Campos, Watson	
August 27, 2011	Atlanta Silverbacks	A	4–2	3,313	Barbara (3), McManus	
September 3, 2011	FC Tampa Bay	H	2–0	3,015	Campos (2)	
September 7, 2011	Fort Lauderdale Strikers	A	1-0	2,159		
September 11, 2011	Montreal Impact	A	1–0	12,297		
September 17, 2011	Puerto Rico Islanders	A	1-0			
September 24, 2011	NSC Minnesota Stars	H	1-2	6,234	Pablo Campos	6,234

== Club ==
=== Roster ===
As of May 11, 2011

Note: Flags indicate national team as defined under FIFA eligibility rules; some limited exceptions apply. Players may hold more than one non-FIFA nationality.

No.	Pos.	Nation	Player
0	GK	USA	Sean O'Connor
1	GK	USA	Brad Knighton
2	DF	USA	Brad Rusin (captain)
3	MF	USA	Kupono Low
4	DF	USA	Devon McKenney
5	MF	USA	Floyd Franks
6	MF	SCO	Stephen Glass
7	MF	USA	Brian Farber
8	MF	ENG	Matt Watson
9	FW	BRA	Pablo Campos
10	FW	MLT	Etienne Barbara
11	FW	SCO	Allan Russell

No.	Pos.	Nation	Player
12	DF	PUR	John Krause
16	DF	USA	Cory Miller
17	MF	GUY	Chris Nurse
18	DF	USA	Kyle Schmid
19	FW	GRN	Kithson Bain
22	MF	NIR	Jonny Steele (on loan from FC Tampa Bay)
23	MF	USA	Nick Zimmerman
26	MF	USA	Cory Elenio
40	GK	AUS	Caleb Patterson-Sewell
—	FW	SLE	Sallieu Bundu (on loan to Charlotte Eagles)
—	MF	USA	Nick Thompson

=== Team management ===
- (Scotland) Martin Rennie - Head Coach
- (Scotland) Paul Ritchie - Assistant Coach
- (United States) Dewan Bader - Assistant Coach
- (Croatia) Nenad Žigante - Goalkeeper Coach
- (United States) Andy Dunbar - Equipment Manager
- (United States) Lizy Coleman - Head Trainer
- (United States) Paul Coleman - Massage Therapist

== Standings ==
Carolina RailHawks' first season in the North American Soccer League began on April 9 and will end on September 24. The team presently stands in first place in the single league table.

Pos	Team	Pld	W	D	L	GF	GA	GD	Pts	Qualification
1	Carolina RailHawks (X)	28	17	3	8	50	26	+24	54	Playoff semifinals
2	Puerto Rico Islanders	28	15	7	6	41	32	+9	52	Playoff semifinals
3	Tampa Bay Rowdies	28	11	8	9	41	36	+5	41	Playoff quarterfinals
4	Fort Lauderdale Strikers	28	9	11	8	35	36	−1	38	Playoff quarterfinals
5	FC Edmonton	28	10	6	12	35	40	−5	36 (Note: EDM: 8 pts; MIN: 2 pts)	Playoff quarterfinals

Source: NASL Standings
Rules for classification: 1) points; 2) head-to-head record; 3) goal difference; 4) number of goals scored.
(X) Regular season champion

== Transfers ==
=== In ===
Date	Player	Previous club	Fee	Ref
	(United States) Devon McKenney	(United States) Real Maryland Monarchs	Undisclosed	
	(Scotland) Stephen Glass	(Scotland) Dunfermline Athletic	Undisclosed	
	(United States) Brian Farber	(United States) Portland Timbers	Free	
	(Brazil) Pablo Campos	(United States) Real Salt Lake	Free	
	(Scotland) Allan Russell	(Scotland) Kilmarnock	Free	
	(Puerto Rico) John Krause	(China) Beijing Baxy	Free	
