= Caleb Patterson-Sewell =

American soccer player

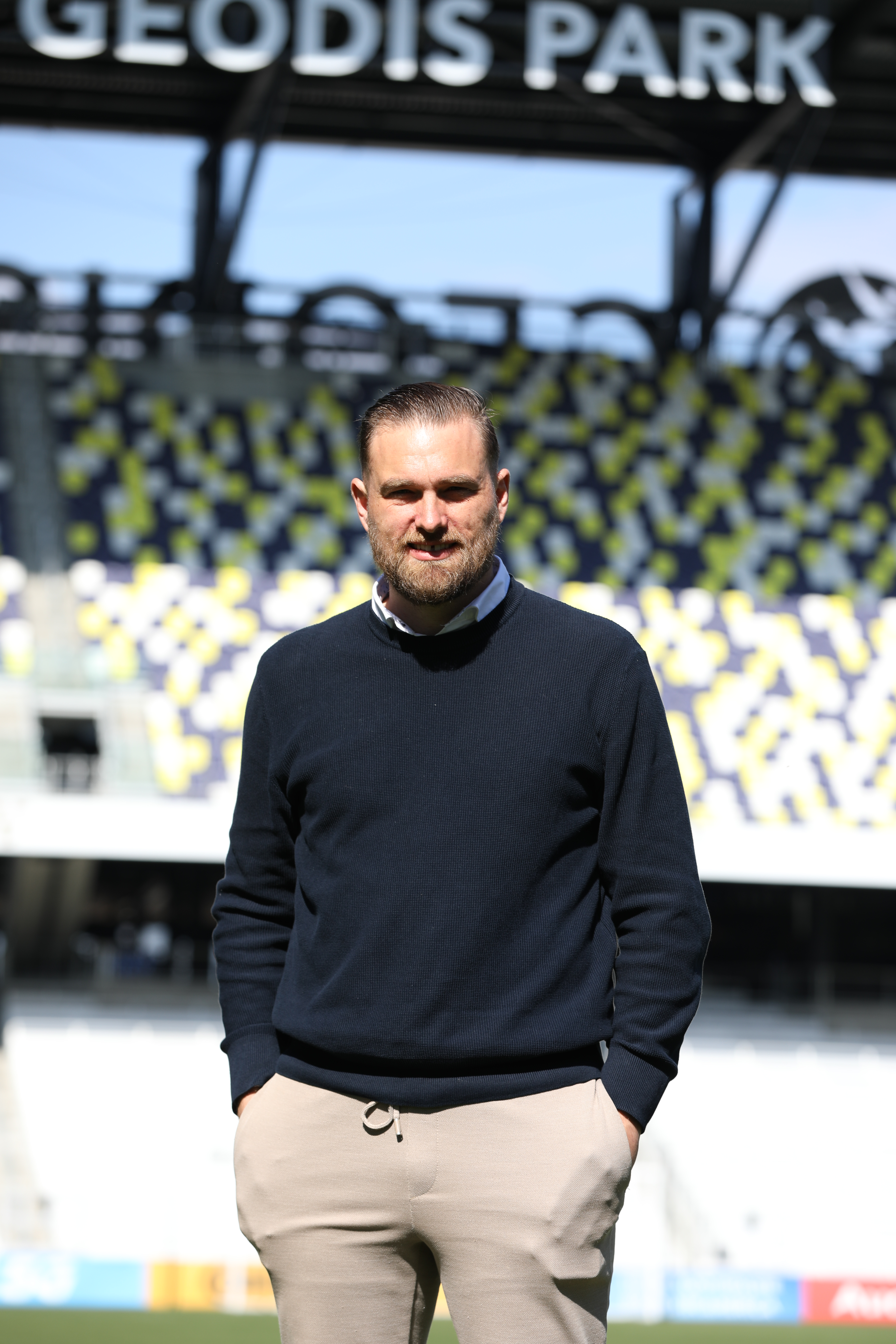
- Patterson-Sewell in 2024

Personal information
- Date of birth: May 20, 1987 (age 39)
- Place of birth: Hendersonville, Tennessee, United States
- Height: 6 ft 3 in (1.91 m)
- Position: Goalkeeper

Youth career
- Toowoomba Raiders
- 2004: Anderlecht
- 2004–2005: Sheffield Wednesday
- 2005: Liverpool

Senior career*
Years	Team	Apps	(Gls)
2005	Toowoomba Raiders		
2006	Mt Gravatt Hawks		
2007	Cleveland City Stars	8	(0)
2008	New York Red Bulls	0	(0)
2009	Carolina RailHawks	15	(0)
2009	→ New York Red Bulls (loan)	0	(0)
2010	Miami FC	25	(0)
2011	Carolina RailHawks	0	(0)
2011–2012	Atlético CP	29	(0)
2012–2013	Vitória de Setúbal	3	(0)
2013–2015	Gil Vicente	1	(0)
2016	Rayo OKC	0	(0)
2016–2017	Farense	13	(0)
2017	Jacksonville Armada	31	(0)
2018–2019	Toronto FC	0	(0)
2018–2019	→ Toronto FC II (loan)	25	(0)
2020	MLS Pool	–	(–)
2021	Toronto FC II	11	(0)
Total		161+	(0)

Managerial career
- 2021: Toronto FC II (assistant)
- 2022–2024: Memphis 901 (assistant/assistant sport director)
- 2024: Memphis 901 (sport director)
- 2025–: FC Tulsa (sport director/general manager)
- * Club domestic league appearances and goals as of October 29, 2021

Caleb Patterson-Sewell (born May 20, 1987) is an American soccer coach and former professional player, who is currently the sporting director and general manager of FC Tulsa in the USL Championship.

== Early life and career ==
Patterson-Sewell moved with his parents to Australia when he was six years old and grew up in Gatton, Queensland, and began his youth career in Australia with the Toowoomba Raiders junior soccer system. While at the club he was regarded as one of the nation's most promising junior talents. He attended the Queensland Academy of Sport, and played junior football for a variety of youth clubs (Gatton SC, South Toowoomba Raiders, West Wanderers), but it was his play with the Toowoomba Raiders that helped him draw the interest of numerous European clubs. In 2004 Patterson-Sewell joined Anderlecht's reserve side. In late 2004 he was signed by Sheffield Wednesday's youth academy. Patterson-Sewell's spectacular play in goal at Sheffield Wednesday did not go unnoticed by bigger clubs. He was offered a chance to join Liverpool's Under 19 side and spurned Wednesday's contract offers. He appeared in 4 matches for the Liverpool Under 19 side in 2005.

== Club career ==
In 2005–06, Patterson-Sewell returned to Australia once his work permit ran out to sign a temporary contract with Toowoomba Raiders and Mt. Gravatt in the Brisbane Premier League. He was expected to return to Belgium and play for a Liverpool feeder club.

=== Cleveland City Stars ===
In 2007, Patterson-Sewell signed with American USL Second Division side Cleveland City Stars instead of returning to Europe in hopes of impressing Major League Soccer clubs. While with Cleveland City, Patterson-Sewell helped the club to its first ever qualification to the US Open Cup in 2007. In eight appearances he had a goals against average of 1.00, including three shut-outs.

=== New York Red Bulls ===
In early 2008, Patterson-Sewell went on trial with Major League Soccer club New York Red Bulls. His play in goal impressed New York Red Bulls and he was signed by the club in the 2008 MLS season. Paterson-Sewell made no appearances for Red Bulls and declined a contract offer to remain with club before the start of the 2009 MLS season. At the end of the 2009 season, Patterson-Sewell returned to the New York Red Bulls as the backup goalkeeper. Patterson-Sewell played in all of the preseason games for New York, including the final of the Walt Disney World preseason tournament in Florida, which New York won.

=== Carolina RailHawks ===
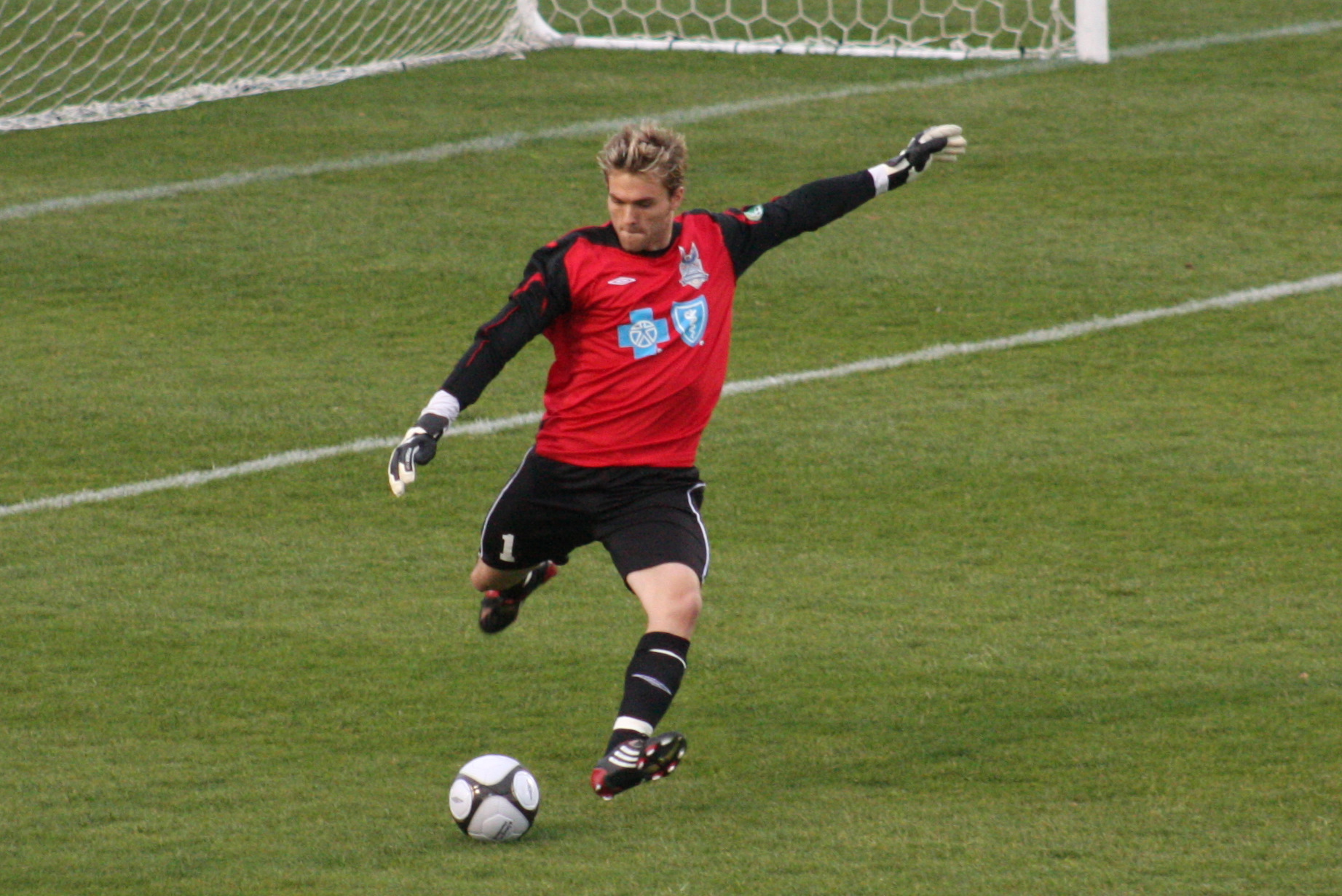
Caleb Patterson-Sewell with the Carolina RailHawks

In February 2009, Patterson-Sewell was signed by Carolina RailHawks of the USL First Division for the USL 1 2009 season. At the end of the 2009–2010 season, New York was granted permission by MLS to sign Patterson-Sewell again on loan due to an "extreme hardship" case.

=== Miami FC ===
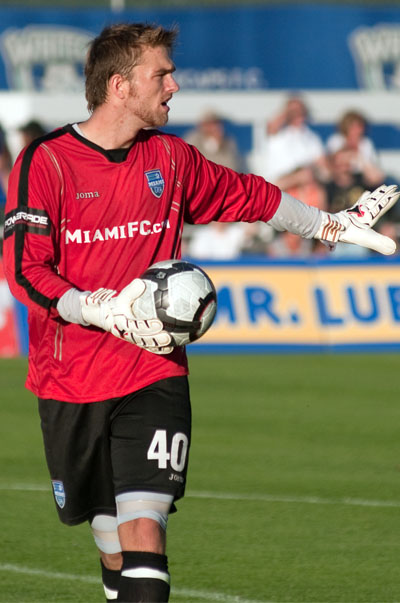
Caleb Patterson-Sewell playing for Miami FC

Patterson-Sewell spent the 2010 USSF Pro League with Miami FC starting 25 games for the club and finishing runner up in the Fans Player of the Year award. In April 2011, Patterson-Sewell signed again with Carolina RailHawks, now playing in the North American Soccer League.

=== Atlético CP ===
Patterson-Sewell remained at Carolina RailHawks for only a few months as he was transferred to Portugal in the 2011–2012 season transfer window to newly promoted Liga de Honra club Atlético Clube de Portugal for the 2011–2012 Liga de Honra season. Upon his arrival in Portugal he quickly established himself as Atlético's starting goalkeeper and was nominated for 2012 Goalkeeper of the Year award at the 2012 LPFP Awards.

=== Vitória de Setúbal ===
On July 1, 2012, Patterson-Sewell signed with Vitória Setúbal in the Primeira Liga for two years. At the end of the 2012 season Patterson-Sewell asked to be released from his contract.

=== Gil Vicente ===
On June 6, 2013, Patterson-Sewell signed with Gil Vicente FC in the Primeira Liga for two seasons following his former Atlético Clube de Portugal manager Joao de Deus.

=== Rayo OKC ===
Patterson-Sewell returned to the United States by signing a contract with NASL expansion side Rayo OKC on January 26, 2016. After a few months Caleb asked for a release from his contract allowing him to return to Portugal with SC Farense.

=== Farense ===
Patterson-Sewell signed with SC Farense in August 2016, playing 16 games for them, and leading them to a promotion place with one of the best goals against records in the country.

=== Jacksonville Armada ===
In February 2017, Patterson-Sewell signed with Jacksonville Armada FC of the North American Soccer League. Patterson-Sewell would finish the 2017 in the top three of all goalkeeper categories. He also broke the Jacksonville Armada FC clean sheet record (10).

=== Toronto FC ===
In February 2018, Patterson-Sewell signed with defending MLS champions Toronto FC after Toronto acquired his MLS rights from New York Red Bulls in exchange for a fourth-round pick in the 2019 MLS SuperDraft. As the third-choice keeper for the first team, he has spent much of his time playing for the second team, Toronto FC II. Following the 2019 season, Toronto did not pick up his club option for 2020.

=== MLS Pool Goalkeeper ===
Following a failed move to a team in Asia, Patteson-Sewell signed with Major League Soccer to serve as the league's pool goalkeeper. He trained with Nashville SC while serving in the role.

=== Toronto FC II ===
In 2021, he signed as a player-coach with Toronto FC II. He retired following the 2021 season.

== International career ==
Patterson-Sewell is an American Australian and is eligible to represent the Australia national soccer team. The goalkeeper coach for Australia, Tony Franken, flew to Portugal to watch Patterson-Sewell play. Local media reports suggested Patterson-Sewell would be called up for Australia for their friendly against Romania.

== Coaching career ==
In 2021, he joined Toronto FC II in USL League One as a player-coach, serving as an assistant and goalkeeping coach, as well as a player.

In 2022, following his official retirement from playing, he joined Memphis 901 FC in the USL Championship as assistant sporting director and assistant coach.

On June 19, 2024, with the departure of Tim Howard from Memphis 901 FC, he was named Acting Sporting Director of the USL Championship team. Memphis suspended operations following the 2024 season.

On January 9, 2025, FC Tulsa appointed Sewell as their sporting director and general manager.

== Career statistics ==
As of October 29, 2021

Club	Season	League			National Cup (Note: Appearances in the U.S. Open Cup and Taça de Portugal)		League Cup (Note: All appearances in the Taça da Liga)		Continental		Other		Total	
Club	Season	Division	Apps	Goals	Apps	Goals	Apps	Goals	Apps	Goals	Apps	Goals	Apps	Goals
Toowoomba Raiders	2005	Brisbane Premier League			—		—		—		—			
Mt. Gravatt Hawks	2006	Brisbane Premier League			—		—		—		—			
Cleveland City Stars	2007	USL-2	8	0	2	0	—		—		0	0	10	0
New York Red Bulls	2008	MLS	0	0	0	0	—		—		0	0	0	0
Carolina RailHawks	2009	USL-1	15	0	1	0	—		—		1 (Note: Appearance in the USL First Division playoffs)	0	17	0
New York Red Bulls (loan)	2009	MLS	0	0	0	0	—		0	0	—		0	0
Miami FC	2010	D2 Pro League	25	0	3	0	—		—		—		28	0
Carolina RailHawks	2011	NASL	0	0	—		—		—		0	0	0	0
Atlético CP	2011–12	Liga de Honra	29	0	0	0	0	0	—		—		29	0
Vitória de Setúbal	2012–13	Primeira Liga	3	0	0	0	2	0	—		—		5	0
Gil Vicente	2013–14	Primeira Liga	0	0	2	0	4	0	—		—		6	0
Gil Vicente	2014–15	Primeira Liga	1	0	0	0	4	0	—		—		5	0
Gil Vicente	Total		1	0	2	0	8	0	0	0	0	0	11	0
Rayo OKC	2016	NASL	0	0	0	0	—		—		0	0	0	0
Farense	2016–17	Campeonato de Portugal	13	0	1	0	—		—		—		14	0
Jacksonville Armada	2017	NASL	31	0	1	0	—		—		—		32	0
Toronto FC	2018	MLS	0	0	0	0	—		0	0	0	0	0	0
Toronto FC	2019	MLS	0	0	0	0	—		0	0	0	0	0	0
Toronto FC	Total		0	0	0	0	0	0	0	0	0	0	0	0
Toronto FC II (loan)	2018	USL	19	0	—		—		—		—		19	0
Toronto FC II (loan)	2019	USL League One	6	0	—		—		—		—		6	0
Toronto FC II (loan)	Total		25	0	0	0	0	0	0	0	0	0	25	0
Toronto FC II	2021	USL League One	11	0	—		—		—		—		11	0
Career total			161+	0	10	0	10	0	0	0	1	0	182+	0

== Honors ==
New York Red Bulls

- Major League Soccer Western Conference: 2008
