= Go' morgen Danmark =

Danish morning television show

- Genre: Morning show
- Presented by: Mikkel Kryger; Ida Wohlert; Adam Duvå Hall; Louise Wolff; Steen Langeberg; Puk Elgård
- Country of origin: Denmark
- Original language: Danish

Production
- Production location: Copenhagen Central Station
- Production company: Nordisk Film TV

Original release
- Network: TV 2
- Release: December 2, 1996

Related
- Go' Aften Danmark; Go' Aften Live; Go' Sommer Danmark; Go' Appetit

Go' morgen Danmark (English: Good Morning Denmark) is a Danish morning television show that airs on TV 2. The program airs live from Copenhagen's Central Station, with occasional segments recorded at Tivoli. As of June 2020, it is hosted by Mikkel Kryger, Ida Wohlert, Adam Duvå Hall, Louise Wolff, Steen Langeberg, and Puk Elgård.

The program's success has led to several spin-off news shows on the same channel, which are often presented by the same hosts. The spin-offs have included Go' sommer Danmark, Go' appetit, and Go' aften Live (formerly Go' aften Danmark).

== History ==
Go' morgen Danmark first aired on December 2, 1996. It was originally hosted by an experienced news presenter, Michael Meyerheim, along with Cecilie Frøkjær, a young journalist student. Frøkjær was later awarded as female TV-host of the year in 2004, 2006, 2007, and 2008 for her work by Tvprisen. In 1998 the program added two new hosts, Søren Kaster and Synne Garff. The show has since maintained multiple regular hosts.

In 1997, the program began being produced by the Danish film studios in Lyngby. The studio, which had been staged as an apartment, was moved to the TV studios in Amager. By 2002, the show had again moved to Copenhagen Central Station and the program has aired from this location ever since.

In 2009 the show was purchased by the studio Nordisk Film. Production and staff was largely changed by the new studio, though hosts Cecilie Frøkjær and Morten Resen were bought out of their contracts with Skandinavisk Film Kompagni.

== Morning television in Denmark ==
Denmark's first morning television show, Morgenflimmer, aired from 1984 until 1991 on Kanal 2, a TV station in Copenhagen. A month before Go' morgen Danmark premiered, a similarly titled program named simply Go' morgen began airing on TV3. The program was produced by Nordisk Film, but was not as popular as the studio had hoped. The show was taken off the air in 1997.

DR aired a morning show from 2001 to 2006 called DR Morgen, which focused on news programming. Since 2007, DR1 has aired Morgenhår along with cartoons to cater towards families with children.

== Hosts ==
=== Current ===
- Ida Wohlert (2009–present)
- Michèle Bellaiche (2011–present)
- Mikkel Kryger (2012–present)
- Puk Elgård (2014–present)
- Steen Langeberg (2013–present)
- Louise Wolff (2015–present)
- Heidi Frederikke Rasmussen (2016–present)
- David Guldager (2017–present)
- Adam Duvå Hall (2018–present)
- Janni Pedersen (2020, temporary)

=== Former ===
- Cecilie Frøkjær (1996–2009)
- Michael Meyerheim (1996–2006)
- Søren Vesterby (1996–1998)
- Søren Kaster (1998–2000)
- Synne Garff (1998)
- Sarah-Cathrine Wandsø (1999)
- Steen Ankerdal (2001)
- Mette Lisby (2001)
- Tina Bilsbo (2001–2002)
- Mette Weyde (2002)
- Ole Stephensen (2002–2008)
- Anette Kokholm (2003–2004)
- Anton Kjær (2003–2004)
- Nicola Baier (2003–2004)
- Henriette Honoré (2004–2006)
- Jens Gaardbo (2005)
- Torún Ellingsgaard (2005)
- Tina Nikolaisen (2006)
- Line Baun Danielsen (2006–2008)
- Jes Dorph-Petersen (2006–2007, 2020–2021)
- Morten Resen (2007–2016)
- Anders Breinholt (2009–2010)
- Kamilla Walsøe (2009–2010)
- Cecilie Hother (2010–2012)
- Katrine Hertz Mortensen (2010–2014)
- Lisbeth Østergaard (2010–2016)
- Morten Ankerdal (during the 2010 Winter Olympics, 2014–2018)
- Jacob Wilson (2011)
- Mikkel Herforth (2011–2012)
- Pelle Hvenegaard (2012)
- Ellen Nybo (2012–2014)
- Ibi Makienok (2012–2014)
- Majbrit Søgaard (2012–2015)
- Mikkel Beha Erichsen (2014–2015)
- Stéphanie Surrugue (2014–2015)
- Karin Cruz Forsstrøm (2014–2016)
- Gertrud Højlund (2015)
- Karen-Helene Hjorth (2016, temporary)
- Michael Robak (2016–2018)
