= Brad Rusin =

American soccer player

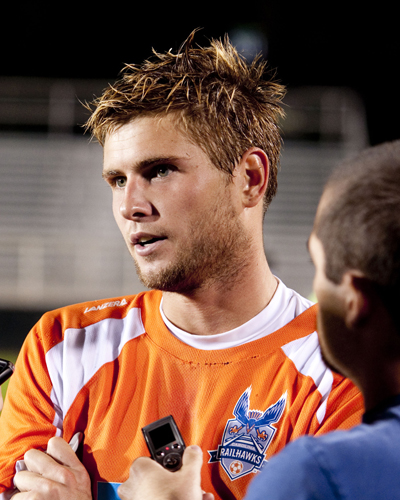

Personal information
- Full name: Bradford Evan Rusin
- Date of birth: September 5, 1986 (age 40)
- Place of birth: Crown Point, Indiana, United States
- Height: 6 ft 4 in (1.93 m)
- Position: Defender

College career
Years	Team	Apps	(Gls)
2005–2008	UCLA Bruins	76	(4)

Senior career*
Years	Team	Apps	(Gls)
2005	Bradenton Academics	15	(5)
2007	Ventura County Fusion	10	(0)
2008	San Fernando Valley Quakes	10	(1)
2009–2011	Carolina RailHawks	44	(1)
2011–2013	HB Køge	33	(2)
2013	Vancouver Whitecaps FC	19	(0)
2014	Orlando City	23	(2)
2015	Tampa Bay Rowdies	0	(0)
2015	San Antonio Scorpions	15	(0)
2016–2017	Miami FC	7	(1)
2018	Indy Eleven	11	(0)
Total		187	(12)
- * Club domestic league appearances and goals

Bradford Evan Rusin (born September 5, 1986) is an American retired professional soccer player. He appeared for Bradenton Academics, Ventura County Fusion, and San Fernando Valley Quakes at the semi-professional level, and for Carolina RailHawks, HB Køge, Vancouver Whitecaps FC, Orlando City, Tampa Bay Rowdies, San Antonio Scorpions, Miami FC, and Indy Eleven at the professional level.

== College and amateur ==
Rusin grew up in Indiana and moved to Holmes Beach, Florida in 2002. There, he attended St. Stephen's Preparatory School, where he was a 2005 EA Sports All-American. He attended the IMG Soccer Academy in Bradenton, Florida from 2002 to 2005, winning the 2005 U-19 Dallas Cup, before playing college soccer at UCLA. He was named to the College Soccer News All-Freshman first team and to Top Drawer Soccer's All-Rookie Team in 2005, earned honorable mention All-Pac-10 honors in 2006 and 2007, and was named to the NSCAA All-Far West Region second team, the All-Pac-10 first team and the Top Drawer Soccer Team of the Season second team in 2008.

During his college years he also played with Bradenton Academics, Ventura County Fusion and San Fernando Valley Quakes in the Premier Development League, helping the Quakes to the PDL Southwest Division title in 2008.

== Club career ==
Having already trialed with Premier League side Bolton Wanderers in the summer of 2004, Rusin travelled to Norway in the summer of 2008 to trial with both IK Start and Bodø/Glimt. Having not been offered a contract by either team, Rusin joined Carolina RailHawks of the USL First Division in April 2009. He made his professional debut on May 2, 2009, in a game against Portland Timbers. In August 2010, HB Køge of the Danish 1st Division expressed an interest in Rusin, but was unable to come to an agreement with the RailHawks. Rusin was named team captain in 2011, but on July 6 he signed a three-year deal with HB Køge, which had won promotion to the Danish Superliga for the upcoming season.

On January 11, 2013, Rusin was sold to Major League Soccer club Vancouver Whitecaps FC for an undisclosed fee.

On February 12, 2014, Rusin signed with USL Pro club Orlando City on a one-year deal. He was released upon the conclusion of the 2014 season, a casualty of the club's transition to Major League Soccer.

On December 24, 2014, Rusin signed with North American Soccer League club Tampa Bay Rowdies. Rusin was traded to the San Antonio Scorpions in exchange for midfielder Richard Menjívar on April 29, 2015.

On December 15, 2015, NASL expansion side Miami FC officially announced their signing of Rusin, alongside midfielder Blake Smith.

On January 25, 2018, Rusin signed for USL side Indy Eleven for the 2018 season.

== Career statistics ==
Appearances and goals by club, season and competition
Club	Season	League			Playoffs (Note: Includes the USL First Division playoffs and USSF Division 2 Professional League playoffs)		Cup (Note: Includes the U.S. Open Cup, Danish Cup, and Canadian Championship)		Total	
Club	Season	Division	Apps	Goals	Apps	Goals	Apps	Goals	Apps	Goals
Bradenton Academics	2005	PDL	15	5	–		–		15	5
Ventura County Fusion	2007	PDL	10	0	–		–		10	0
San Fernando Valley Quakes	2008	PDL	10	1	0	0	–		10	1
Carolina RailHawks	2009	USL-1	19	0	2	0	0	0	21	0
Carolina RailHawks	2010	USSF D2	14	0	6	1	2	0	22	1
Carolina RailHawks	2011	NASL	11	1	0	0	0	0	11	1
Carolina RailHawks	Total		44	1	8	1	2	0	54	2
HB Køge	2011–12	Superliga	23	2	–		2	0	25	2
HB Køge	2012–13	1. Division	10	0	–		2	0	12	0
HB Køge	Total		33	2	0	0	4	0	37	2
Vancouver Whitecaps FC	2013	MLS	19	0	–		1	0	20	0
Orlando City	2014	USL Pro	23	2	0	0	2	0	25	2
Tampa Bay Rowdies	2015	NASL	0	0	–		0	0	0	0
San Antonio Scorpions	2015	NASL	15	0	–		0	0	15	0
Miami FC	2016	NASL	7	1	–		0	0	7	1
Miami FC	2017	NASL	0	0	0	0	0	0	0	0
Miami FC	Total		7	1	0	0	0	0	7	1
Indy Eleven	2018	USL	11	0	0	0	1	0	12	0
Career total			187	12	8	1	10	0	205	13
