= Morten Haastrup Jensen =

Danish footballer (born 1989)

Morten H. Jensen
Personal information
- Full name: Morten Haastrup Jensen
- Date of birth: 5 May 1989 (age 37)
- Place of birth: Køge, Denmark
- Height: 1.80 m (5 ft 11 in)
- Position: Goalkeeper

Youth career
- Herfølge

Senior career*
| Years | Team | Apps | (Gls) |
| 2007–2009 | Herfølge | 1 | (0) |
| 2009–2013 | HB Køge | 91 | (0) |
| 2013–2016 | Vejle | 27 | (0) |
| Total | | 119 | (0) |
- * Club domestic league appearances and goals

Morten Haastrup Jensen (born 5 May 1989) is a Danish former professional footballer who played as a goalkeeper.

== Career ==
Jensen has played his entire youth career for Herfølge Boldklub, which later became HB Køge after a merger. At an early age, Jensen was selected for Danish national youth sides, but was subsequently sorted out because of his short stature for a goalkeeper. His height has not been a problem for him since, providing high-level performances for his club.

In his first years in Køge, Jensen acted as a backup goalkeeper to first choice Lars Bjerring. He eventually became first choice in the 2010–11 season, being a part in securing promotion to the Danish Superliga. In 2011, Jensen played every match for his team, being the only HB Køge player to do so.

In July 2013, Jensen signed a six-month contract with Vejle Boldklub. On 22 October 2013, the contract was extended to last until the end of the season 2013–14 season.

On 28 July 2016, it was announced that Jensen had ended his professional career after his contract expired with Vejle Boldklub.
