= Henrik Bødker =

Danish footballer (born 1983)

Personal information
- Date of birth: 6 June 1983 (age 43)
- Place of birth: Denmark
- Height: 1.80 m (5 ft 11 in)
- Position: Midfielder

Team information
- Current team: KFUM Roskilde

Senior career*
Years	Team	Apps	(Gls)
2007–2008	FC Nordsjælland	31	(2)
2008–2013	SønderjyskE	96	(2)
2013	Vejle-Kolding	12	(1)
2013–2015	Vejle BK	55	(4)
2015–2017	Næstved BK	24	(0)
2017–	KFUM Roskilde		
- * Club domestic league appearances and goals as of 1 June 2017 (UTC)

Henrik Bødker (born 6 June 1983) is a Danish football midfielder, who currently plays for the Danish side KFUM Roskilde.
