= Ibi Makienok =

Danish model, actress, and singer (born 1975)

- Born: Ibi Katrine Støving; 2 February 1975 (age 51); Aarhus, Denmark
- Occupations: Actress; TV presenter; singer; model

Ibi Katrine Makienok (née Støving, born 2 February 1975) is a Danish model, actress, television presenter, and singer.

== Career ==
She was previously a ballet dancer at the Aarhus Ballet Academy. After graduating from Randers State College in 1995, she studied at the Stella Adler Academy of Acting in Hollywood. She has also been a photo model, a travel writer for Jyllands-Posten, a design assistant, and the author of books on blood-type cooking. She participated in the short-lived girl group Milc, who in 2002 released the single "Feel So Good". More recently, Makienok has focused on writing songs and producing music. From 2005 to 2007, she spent three seasons on the show Paradise Hotel, broadcast on TV3. She has, among others, appeared in the films Portland by Niels Arden Oplev and Aurum by James Barclay.

In 2011, Makienok transferred from TV3 to TV2, where she worked on Weekend Weekend, as well as GO' Morgen Danmark and Hvem Bor Hvor. In 2012, she was editor-in-chief at Miinto.dk and received an Entrepreneurship Award for Best Marketing Campaign in 2013. She also received the award for Best Female TV Host in 2013.

In February 2019, Makienok hosted the controversial TV show Date mig nøgen (Date me naked), the Danish version of the British dating game show Naked Attraction.

== Personal life ==
From 1998 to 2003, Ibi Støving dated René Dif, to whom she was engaged. In September 2003, Dif was sentenced to thirty days' imprisonment for domestic violence. Støving later dated singer Alex Ambrose, from 2005 to 2007. In 2007, she began seeing football player Tobias Grahn, with whom she had a son, Anakin, in 2008. The couple split in August 2009. Støving started dating footballer Simon Makienok in 2013. The couple married on 6 September 2014 in the Church of Holmen in Copenhagen. They divorced in 2019.
