= Simon Makienok =

Danish footballer (born 1990)

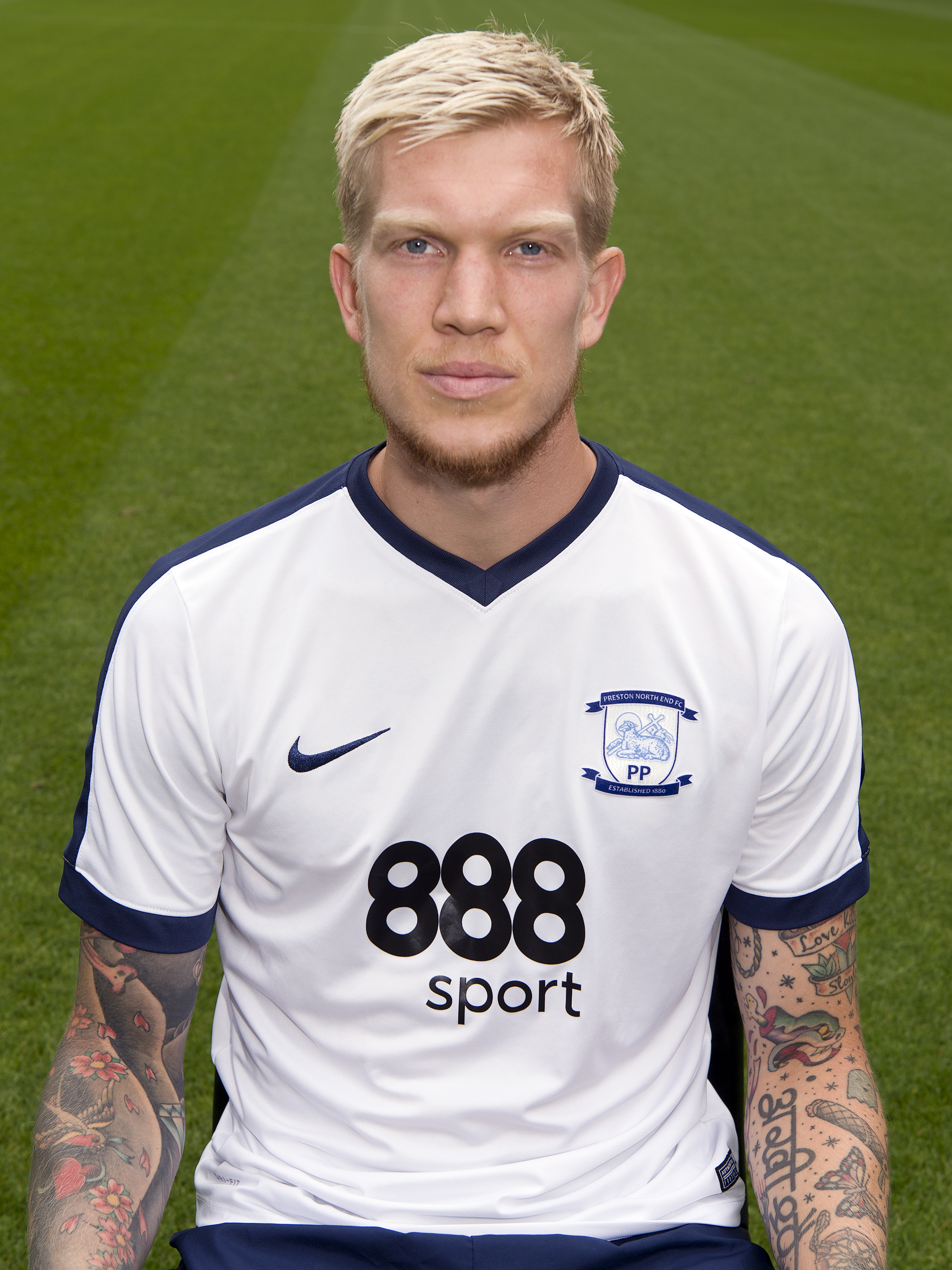
- Makienok with Preston North End in 2016

Personal information
- Full name: Simon Makienok Christoffersen
- Date of birth: 21 November 1990 (age 35)
- Place of birth: Næstved, Denmark
- Height: 2.01 m (6 ft 7 in)
- Position: Striker

Youth career
- 1995–1998: Suså IF
- 1998–2007: Næstved
- 2007–2008: Herfølge

Senior career*
Years	Team	Apps	(Gls)
2008–2012	HB Køge	58	(22)
2012–2014	Brøndby	74	(35)
2014–2017	Palermo	4	(0)
2015–2016	→ Charlton Athletic (loan)	36	(5)
2016–2017	→ Preston North End (loan)	25	(3)
2017–2020	Utrecht	7	(1)
2020	Dynamo Dresden	9	(3)
2020–2022	FC St. Pauli	45	(8)
2022–2023	Horsens	15	(1)
2023–2025	Hvidovre	43	(7)
Total		316	(85)

International career^{‡}
2009	Denmark U19	8	(1)
2009–2011	Denmark U20	3	(0)
2009–2012	Denmark U21	13	(2)
2013	Denmark	6	(0)
- * Club domestic league appearances and goals as of 29 May 2025 ‡ National team caps and goals as of 17:10, 2 May 2025 (UTC)

Simon Makienok Christoffersen (Danish pronunciation: [ˈsimɔn mæˈkʰiːnʌk]; born 21 November 1990) is a Danish professional footballer who plays as a striker.

Born in Næstved, Makienok began his professional career at Herfølge Boldklub, which later became HB Køge, making his debut in 2009, before joining Brøndby IF in January 2012 for a fee of €550,000. After a two-and-a-half-year spell at Brøndby, where the club barely avoided relegation, he was signed by Italian club Palermo for a fee reported to be €2.3 million in August 2014. Palermo then loaned him out to English sides Charlton Athletic and Preston North End, before he signed with Dutch side FC Utrecht in 2017. After two European appearances for the club, he suffered a knee injury which kept him sidelined for two years. He then played for Dynamo Dresden and FC St. Pauli in Germany before returning to Denmark in 2022 where he joined AC Horsens.

Makienok has also represented Denmark at senior and several youth levels, gaining his first cap for the senior side on 22 March 2013 as a 85th-minute substitute in a 2014 FIFA World Cup qualifier against Czech Republic which ended in a 3–0 win for Denmark.

== Career ==
=== Early career ===
Makienok grew up in Herlufmagle, and started playing for local club Suså IF at the age of 4, before making the move to Næstved Boldklub a few years later. On 27 August 2007, he transferred to the Herfølge Boldklub youth academy. He later told in the radio-show Fodboldeffekten on Radio 100, that Næstved Boldklub tried to retain him by offering him a job in a local Shell fuel station, due to lacking funds to pay players. After having spent a year in Herfølge, Makienok signed a five-year contract with the club. On 22 June 2009, he was effectively promoted to the first team competing in the Danish 1st Division (second highest division). He made 22 goals in 58 league appearances for Herfølge and since HB Køge, as part of a 2009 merger.

=== Brøndby ===
Makienok joined Brøndby IF on 28 January 2012 on a €550,000 transfer from HB Køge, signing a four-year contract which tied him to the club until the summer of 2016. He made his debut on 4 March 2012, in a 1–0 win against SønderjyskE. He scored his first goal for the club on 18 March 2012 in a 2–1 away win over FC Nordsjælland. He scored a total of 11 goals in 33 league and cup appearances in the 2011–12 season for HB Køge and Brøndby.

In the following season, Makienok was rewarded with Player of the Month of the Danish Superliga for his performances during November 2012. In the 2012–13 season he amassed 15 goals in 34 league and cup appearances, as Brøndby barely avoided relegation from the Superliga in the last fixture of the season against Horsens.

On 20 August 2013, Brøndby announced that they had accepted an €3.8 million (DKK28.5 million) offer from a Russian club for Makienok. However, Makienok was not interested in the move and decided t stay. According to multiple Danish newspapers, he turned down a weekly salary of €34,000 (€1,632,000/year) from Russian club FC Terek Grozny. In the same year, he caught the attention of several French clubs and English sides Crystal Palace and Fulham while his price tag was reported as over €4 million. According to several Danish media sources, Makienok had rejected a contract extension wanting to pursue new challenges during the 2014 summer transfer window.

On 31 July 2014, Makienok made his Europa League-debut starting in a 3–0 away defeat to Belgian side Club Brugge. During the last weeks of the 2014 summer transfer window, new rumours circulated about foreign interest in him. Several Serie A clubs revealed their interest, with Palermo leading Atalanta, Cesena and Scottish side Celtic in the chase, as his price tag was now €3 million according to Danish media.

=== Palermo ===
On 30 August 2014, Makienok penned a four-year contract with newly promoted Italian side Palermo after days of speculation. The transfer fee was reportedly €2.3 million.

==== Loan to Charlton Athletic ====
On 1 July 2015, Makienok joined Charlton Athletic on a one-year loan. He scored his first goal for the club in a 2–1 win over Hull City on 22 August 2015. He netted 5 goals in the course of the season, in which his Charlton Athletic side were relegated from the Championship.

==== Loan to Preston North End ====
Following Makienok's spell at Charlton Athletic, he joined Preston North End on loan, from 1 July 2016. He was the club's second summer signing, following the signing of goalkeeper Chris Maxwell. On 20 September 2016, he scored a hat-trick as Preston knocked Premier League side Bournemouth out of the EFL Cup.

On 15 October he came off the bench in the 79th minute to score his first league goal of the season, with a dramatic injury time equaliser as he latched on to Gallagher's pin point cross to head home, which stretched Preston's unbeaten run to five games after a slow start to the season.

=== Utrecht ===
On 7 June 2017, Makienok signed a three-year contract with Dutch Eredivisie club FC Utrecht, where he was meant to succeed Sébastien Haller as the team's target-man. After making two appearances in the Europa League qualifiers he tore his anterior cruciate ligament keeping him sidelined for a lengthy period. Makienok had multiple complications and setbacks during his rehabilitation, only making his comeback on the pitch two years after suffering the injury, on 31 October 2019 in a 4–1 cup win over fifth tier club Excelsior '31, in which he scored a goal. A few days later, on 3 November, he was subbed on against Fortuna Sittard in the Eredivisie and scored his first goal in the Dutch league only three minutes later as Utrecht won 6–0. After the match, he said that the comeback felt "surreal" and "a dream come true". In an interview with Simon Routledge in the radio-show Fodboldeffekten on Radio 100, Makienok stated that he had "almost felt depressed" during his two years away from football.

=== Dynamo Dresden ===
On 29 January 2020, Dynamo Dresden announced Makienok's signing on a six-month deal. He was sent off with a red card seven minutes into his debut on 7 February against Darmstadt 98 after coming on as a substitute in the 70th minute of the match after stepping illegally on opposing goalkeeper Marcel Schuhen. Makienok made his first goal for the club on 28 February, scoring the winner on a return ball in a 2–1 win over Jahn Regensburg.

On 12 May, Makienok and two other teammates tested positive for COVID-19, ruling them out for an indefinite period of time. He was declared healthy again on 23 May, and made his return to the pitch for Dresden on 9 June in a 1–1 home draw against Greuther Fürth, where he scored the equaliser after coming on for Jannik Müller during the half. The club suffered relegation to the 3. Liga on 28 June after a 2–2 draw against VfL Osnabrück, and Makienok left the club as a free agent.

=== FC St. Pauli ===
On 29 August 2020, Makienok signed a two-year contract with FC St. Pauli where he was expected to replace Henk Veerman. After signing, Makienok stated that he had always perceived St. Pauli as "a special club", whose values of "equality, tolerance and respect" he shared. The same day as the move was announced, Danish tabloid B.T. revealed that Makienok had turned down an offer from Danish Superliga club OB.

=== Horsens ===
On deadline day, 31 August 2022, Makienok joined Danish Superliga side AC Horsens on a deal until June 2023. During the spring season, Makienok broke both an arm and a leg. For this reason, his stay in Horsens was never really good, which is why he left the club after the 2022–23 season.

=== Hvidovre IF ===
On 26 August 2023, Makienok signed with newly promoted Danish Superliga-side Hvidovre IF.

Makienok left Hvidovre at the end of the 2024–25 season.

== Personal life ==
In August 2013, Simon Makienok started dating the Danish TV-host Ibi Støving who is 16 years older than him. Ibi has a son, Anakin, with the former professional footballer Tobias Grahn. The couple revealed on their personal blog crystalkidbabyshark.com that Makienok had proposed to Ibi on 4 April 2014. They got married on 6 September 2014 in Holmen Church in Copenhagen.

On 3 December 2019, it was confirmed that Makienok and Støving had split a year prior to the report, as rumours had emerged after the two had unfollowed each other on Instagram. It was later revealed that Makienok had started dating Støving's friend, The Voice radio-host Ida-Sophia Petersen.

== Career statistics ==
=== Club ===
As of match played 3 May 2025

Appearances and goals by club, season and competition
Club	Season	League			Cup		Europe		Total	
Club	Season	Division	Apps	Goals	Apps	Goals	Apps	Goals	Apps	Goals
Herfølge	2008–09	Danish 1st Division	4	0	0	0	–		4	0
HB Køge	2009–10	Danish Superliga	9	1	2	0	–		11	1
HB Køge	2010–11	Danish 1st Division	28	16	1	0	–		29	16
HB Køge	2011–12	Danish Superliga	17	5	2	1	–		19	6
HB Køge	Total		54	22	5	1	0	0	59	23
Brøndby IF	2011–12	Danish Superliga	14	5	0	0	–		14	5
Brøndby IF	2012–13	Danish Superliga	31	15	3	0	–		34	15
Brøndby IF	2013–14	Danish Superliga	24	12	1	1	–		25	13
Brøndby IF	2014–15	Danish Superliga	5	3	0	0	2 (Note: Appearances in the Europa League)	0	7	3
Brøndby IF	Total		74	35	4	1	2	0	80	36
Palermo	2014–15	Serie A	4	0	0	0	–		4	0
Charlton Athletic (loan)	2015–16	Championship	36	5	1	0	–		37	5
Preston North End (loan)	2016–17	Championship	25	3	4	3	–		29	6
Utrecht	2017–18	Eredivisie	0	0	0	0	2	0	2	0
Utrecht	2018–19	Eredivisie	3	0	0	0	0	0	3	0
Utrecht	2019–20	Eredivisie	4	1	1	1	0	0	5	2
Utrecht	Total		7	1	1	1	2	0	10	2
Dynamo Dresden	2019–20	2. Bundesliga	9	3	0	0	–		9	3
FC St. Pauli	2020–21	2. Bundesliga	18	2	1	0	–		19	2
FC St. Pauli	2021–22	2. Bundesliga	27	6	3	0	–		30	6
FC St. Pauli	Total		45	8	4	0	0	0	49	8
Horsens	2022–23	Danish Superliga	15	1	1	0	—		16	1
Hvidovre	2023–24	Danish Superliga	19	2	3	3	—		22	5
Hvidovre	2024–25	Danish Superliga	22	5	0	0	—		22	5
Hvidovre	Total		41	7	3	3	0	0	44	10
Career total			314	85	23	9	4	0	341	94

- (-) Not qualified
