= Johnny Thomsen =

Danish footballer (born 1982)

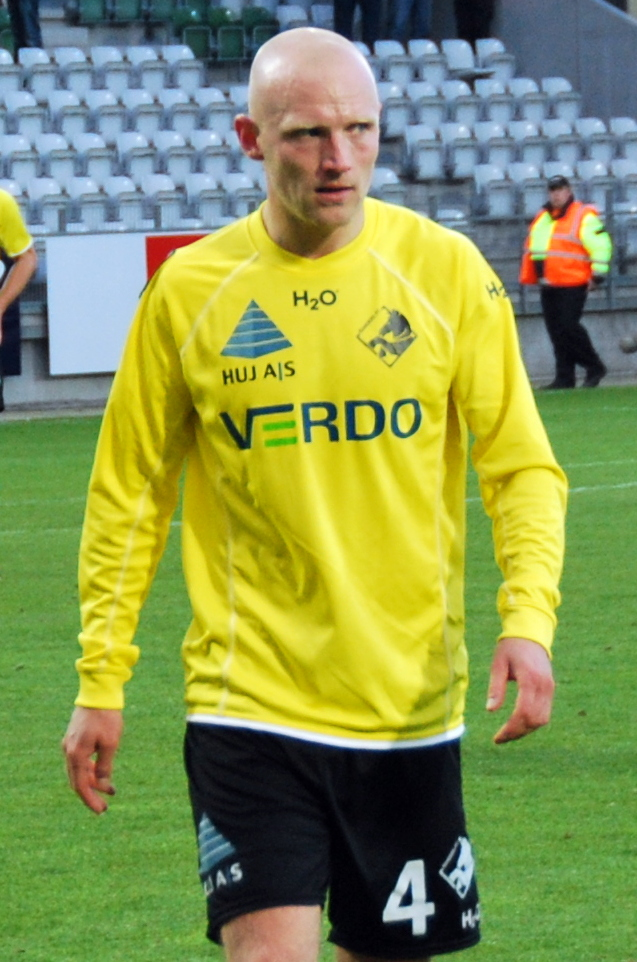
- Thomsen in April 2012. (Photo: Lars Schmidt)

Personal information
- Full name: Johnny Juul Thomsen
- Date of birth: 26 February 1982 (age 44)
- Place of birth: Fredericia, Denmark
- Height: 1.83 m (6 ft 0 in)
- Position: Right back

Youth career
- Fredericia KFUM

Senior career*
Years	Team	Apps	(Gls)
–2002	Fredericia KFUM		
2002–2005	Fredericia	93	(6)
2006–2011	SønderjyskE	96	(3)
2011–2012	Copenhagen	17	(0)
2012–2020	Randers	227	(0)
2021–	Fredericia KFUM		

International career
2010	Denmark	3	(0)
- * Club domestic league appearances and goals as of 6 July 2020

Johnny Juul Thomsen (born 26 February 1982) is a Danish football midfielder who plays for Danish amateur club Fredericia KFUM.

Before this he played in F.C. Copenhagen, SønderjyskE and FC Fredericia. Thomsen has gained 3 caps for the Danish national team.

== Career ==
Johnny played his first match with F.C. Copenhagen against his former club SønderjyskE.

In the start of 2012 he was released from his contract in Copenhagen and signed a new 4 year long contract with Randers FC.

After a long career, Thomsen decided to retire from professional football and in June 2021, he re-joined the club where it all began, Fredericia KFUM.
