= Anders Nielsen (footballer, born 1986) =

Danish footballer (born 1986)

Personal information
- Full name: Anders Nielsen
- Date of birth: 28 September 1986 (age 40)
- Place of birth: Denmark
- Height: 1.82 m (5 ft 11 1/2 in)
- Position: Defender

Team information
- Current team: Husqvarna FF

Youth career
- Køge Boldklub

Senior career*
Years	Team	Apps	(Gls)
2005–2007	Køge Boldklub	5	(0)
2007–2009	Næstved Boldklub	31	(2)
2009–2012	AGF	7	(0)
2010–2011	→ SønderjyskE (loan)	13	(0)
2011–2012	HB Køge	0	(0)
2012	FC Oss	4	(0)
2013	FC Roskilde	0	(0)
2014–	Husqvarna FF	6	(0)
- * Club domestic league appearances and goals as of February 12, 2011

Anders Nielsen (born 28 September 1986) is a Danish footballer who plays for Swedish side Husqvarna FF.

== Career ==
Nielsen has a past as a winger which is evident in his defensive game. He is quick, good on the ball and is offensively set. He played as a centre back in Næstved BK, but was brought to AGF to play in the full back position. His debut for AGF was on his 23rd birthday, against Esbjerg fB, which they lost 3–2. Not being able to become a regular starter for AGF in the Danish First Division, he was sent on an 11-month loan to SønderjyskE on 11 August 2010, to get his debut only three days later for the club in the Danish Superliga, playing from start at home in a 1–3 loss against Odense BK.

On 30 January 2012, Nielsen was signed by HB Køge after training with the team for a month.
