= 2012–13 HB Køge season =

Danish football club season

The 2012-13 season is HB Køge's 4th season in existent, since formed from Herfølge Boldklub and Køge Boldklub in 2009.

== League table ==
Pos	Team	Pld	W	D	L	GF	GA	GD	Pts
4	Lyngby Boldklub	33	17	5	11	55	42	+13	56
5	Fredericia	33	11	11	11	53	48	+5	44
6	HB Køge	33	12	8	13	39	45	−6	44
7	Hjørring (Note: On 5 May 2013 FC Hjørring was denied licence renewal because the club failed to meet the economic requirements. The Danish FA decided that the club would be relegated to second division at the end of the season. The decision was appealed by the club and since the club was able to raise the necessary money, the decision was reversed and the club was allowed to stay in the league.)	33	10	10	13	38	41	−3	40
8	Brønshøj (Note: On 30 April Brønshøj was docked six point due to irregularities with player contracts.)	33	12	9	12	41	36	+5	39

Source: Danish Football Association
Rules for classification: 1) points; 2) goal difference; 3) number of goals scored.
