= Lars Bjerring =

Danish footballer and trainer (born 1981)

Personal information
- Full name: Lars Bjerring Larsen
- Date of birth: 30 November 1981 (age 44)
- Place of birth: Denmark
- Height: 1.91 m (6 ft 3 in)
- Position: Goalkeeper

Team information
- Current team: OB (goalkeeping coach)

Senior career*
Years	Team	Apps	(Gls)
	RB1906	125	(0)
–2005	Roskilde	15	(0)
2005–2007	Lolland-Falster	50	(0)
2007–2009	Herfølge	77	(0)
2009–2010	HB Køge	38	(0)
2011	HB Køge	0	(0)

Managerial career
- 2011: Køge Boldklub (youth goalkeeping coach)
- 2011–2015: HB Køge (goalkeeping coach)
- 2015–2016: Nordsjælland (goalkeeping coach)
- 2016–: OB (goalkeeping coach)
- * Club domestic league appearances and goals

Lars Bjerring Larsen (born 30 November 1981) is a Danish football trainer and former football player, who currently works as goalkeeping coach for OB. He had to retire from his active career as a goalkeeper in 2010 due to an injury.

== Coaching career ==
=== Køge BK ===
In February 2011, Bjerring signed a contract with Køge Boldklub as a goalkeeping coach for the youth teams of the club.

=== HB Køge ===
Bjerring signed a full time contract with HB Køge in the summer 2011 as a goalkeeper coach. In March 2012, Bjerring signed a three-month contract with HB Køge as a back-up goalkeeper, because of injuries in the HB Køge squad. He didn't play any matches in the period.

=== FC Nordsjælland ===
FC Nordsjælland signed Bjerring from HB Køge in June 2015 for the new season.

=== OB ===
Bjerring replaced Lars Høgh at OB in March 2016.
