= Devon McKenney =

American soccer player

Personal information
- Full name: Devon McKenney
- Date of birth: September 14, 1984 (age 42)
- Place of birth: North Olmsted, Ohio, United States
- Height: 5 ft 11 in (1.80 m)
- Position: Defender

Youth career
- 2003–2007: Akron Zips

Senior career*
Years	Team	Apps	(Gls)
2007	Bradenton Academics	9	(1)
2009	Carolina RailHawks	15	(0)
2010	Real Maryland Monarchs	5	(0)
2010–2011	Carolina RailHawks	28	(0)
- * Club domestic league appearances and goals as of July 25, 2011

Devon McKenney (born September 14, 1984, in North Olmsted, Ohio) is an American soccer player.

== Career ==
=== College and amateur ===
McKenney attended North Olmsted High School, helping them to the conference and district championships his senior season, with no losses throughout the season, and being named to the first-team All-Southwestern Conference, All-Greater Cleveland, All-Ohio and All-Central United States in 2002. He played college soccer at the University of Akron, where he was named to the All-MAC Second Team as a junior. During his college years he also played with Bradenton Academics in the USL Premier Development League.

=== Professional ===
McKenney spent 2008 with the Columbus Crew reserves, playing in the MLS Reserve Division, but never being called up to the senior team. He caught the eye of Carolina RailHawks head coach Martin Rennie during the 2009 pre-season, and was signed to a professional contract on April 1, 2009. He made his professional debut on April 11, 2009, in the Railhawks' season opener against Minnesota Thunder.
