= Andreas Sørensen =

Danish footballer (born 1984)

Personal information
- Date of birth: 1 August 1984 (age 42)
- Place of birth: Denmark
- Height: 1.86 m (6 ft 1 in)
- Position: Defender

Senior career*
| Years | Team | Apps | (Gls) |
| 2004 | Lyngby BK | 8 | (0) |
| 2004–2007 | Ølstykke FC | 80 | (1) |
| 2007–2008 | Vejle BK | 9 | (0) |
| 2008–2010 | AB | 47 | (2) |
| 2010 | HIK | | |
| 2011–2013 | HB Køge | 48 | (2) |
| 2013–2015 | FC Roskilde | | |
- * Club domestic league appearances and goals as of 9 March 2015

Andreas Sørensen (born 1 August 1984) is a Danish footballer.

== Career ==
On 3 August 2007 he signed a 1-year contract with Vejle Boldklub, but when the club secured promotion to the Danish Superliga he did not get his contract extended, so he was offered a 3-year deal by AB.

Sørensen played for HB Køge in the Danish Superliga in the 2011-12 season.
