= Robinson Ekspeditionen =

- Created by: Charlie Parsons
- Theme music composer: Andreas Nordqvist
- Country of origin: Denmark
- Original language: Danish
- No. of seasons: 27

Original release
- Network: TV3
- Release: September 11, 1998 – present

Related
- Survivor

Robinson Ekspeditionen is a Danish reality television program debuting in 1998. In the spring of 1998 TV3 purchased the broadcast rights to air their own version of Expedition Robinson. Following the success of the Swedish version, Denmark was the first country to adopt their own version of the show. The show has also proven to be a ratings success since its premiere in 1998.

The name alludes to both Robinson Crusoe and The Swiss Family Robinson, two stories featuring people marooned by shipwrecks.

== Format ==
The Robinson format was developed by Planet 24, a United Kingdom television production company owned by Charlie Parsons and Bob Geldof. Their company Castaway Television Productions retained the rights to the concept when they sold Planet 24 in 1999. Mark Burnett later licensed the format to create the American show Survivor in 2000.

Sixteen contestants are put into a survival situation and compete in a variety of physical challenges. Early in each season two teams compete but later on the teams are merged and the competitions become individual. At the end of each show one contestant is eliminated from the show by the others in a secret "island council" ballot.

== Seasons ==
List of Robinson Ekspeditionen seasons
No.	Year	Location	Days	Castaways	Original tribes	Winner	Runner(s)-up	Final vote	Host
1	1998	Langkawi, Malaysia	47	16	Two tribes of eight	Regina Pedersen	Karine Winther		Thomas Mygind
2	1999	El Nido, Philippines	47	17	Two tribes of eight and a 'joker'	Dan Marstrand	Peer Stakroge	7–2	Thomas Mygind
3	2000	Mensirip Island, Malaysia	47	16	Two tribes of eight	Sonny Rønne Pedersen	Pia Rosholm	8–5	Thomas Mygind
4	2001	Mensirip Island, Malaysia	47	19	Two tribes of eight, and three 'jokers' in the merge	Malene Hasselblad	Lars Lang	10–5	Thomas Mygind
5	2002	Mensirip Island, Malaysia	46	21	Two tribes of twelve and eleven returning players	Henrik Ørum	Lone Hattesen	9–6	Thomas Mygind
6	2003	Mensirip Island, Malaysia	46	22	Two tribes of nine and eight players, and two 'jokers'	Frank Quistgard	Rie Pedersen; Marinela Malisic	7–0–0	Thomas Mygind
7	2004	Mersing District, Malaysia	46	20	Two tribes of nine	Mette Frandsen	Tine Petterssen; Duddie Staack	3–3–2	Jakob Kjeldbjerg
8	2005	Malaysia	14	15	VIP; Three tribes of five celebrities from Denmark, Norway and Sweden	Tilde Fröling	Jan Simonsen; Asbjørn Riis	5–4–3	Mikkel Beha Erichsen
9	2005	Besar Island, Malaysia	42	24	Two tribes of twelve	Mogens Brandstrup	Lykke Maigatter; Solveig Zabell	N/A	Jakob Kjeldbjerg
10	2006	Pearl Islands, Panama	25	16	Two teams of eight	Diego Tur	Denise Dupont	N/A	Jakob Kjeldbjerg
11	2007	Mersing District, Malaysia	54	20	Two teams of ten returning and new players	Rikke Gøransson	Malene Hasselblad; Kenneth Ebert	N/A	Jakob Kjeldbjerg
12	2008	Mersing District, Malaysia	42	22	Two teams of ten Paradise Hotel contestants and fans of the show, and two 'jokers'	Daniela Hansen	Hilde Austad	4–4	Jakob Kjeldbjerg
13	2009	Mersing District, Malaysia	46	24	Two teams of twelve divided according to their IQ	Villy Eenberg	Maureen Cruz; Nicolai Karlson	N/A	Jakob Kjeldbjerg
14	2010	Mersing District, Malaysia	51	24	Two teams of twelve, divided into 'masters' and 'slaves'	Søren Engelbret	Hans Ole Ravnholt	N/A	Jakob Kjeldbjerg
15	2011	Caramoan, Philippines	43	24	Two teams of eight, including one returning player, and eight more 'jokers' throughout the season	Hugo Kleister	Marlene Thinggaard; Morten Kleister	N/A	Jakob Kjeldbjerg
16	2013	Mersing District, Malaysia	35	21	Two teams of nine, and two 'jokers'	Jeppe Bruun Hansen	Jan "Due" Due; Martin Christensen	N/A	Jakob Kjeldbjerg
17	2014	Caramoan, Philippines	39	23	Two teams of ten with pre-existing relationship, and three returning 'jokers' later in the season	Stina Herbenö	Henrik Lygteskov; Trine Bang	N/A	Jakob Kjeldbjerg
18	2015	Caramoan, Philippines	39	24	Two teams of twelve with pre-existing relationship, including one returning player	Kenneth Mikkelsen	Camilla Holm; Nicole Bech Hansen	N/A	Jakob Kjeldbjerg
19	2016	Caramoan, Philippines	44	27	Two teams of nine and one team of eight with pre-existing relationship, and one 'joker'	Henrik Oltmann Andersen	Nikolaj Lund Mortensen; Sofie Wulf Kampmann	N/A	Jakob Kjeldbjerg
20	2017	Caramoan, Philippines	45	27	Two tribes of eleven divided by age and one tribe of five returning players	Marlene Berardino	Bjørn Scharling Larsen; Isabella Romani	N/A	Jakob Kjeldbjerg
21	2018	Caramoan, Philippines	45	27	Three tribes divided into 'heroes', 'villains', and 'jokers'	Jamil Faizi	Puriya "Loco" Haidariano; Zanne Maibritt Øbakke	N/A	Jakob Kjeldbjerg
22	2019	Caramoan, Philippines	44	22	Two tribes of eleven	Nis Andreas Prio Sørensen	Jaffer Naveed Janjooa; Kenneth Jørgensen	N/A	Jakob Kjeldbjerg
23	2021	Las Terrenas, Dominican Republic	44	22	Two tribes of eleven	Katrine Ørskov Hedeman	Martin Mortensen; Jesper Warburg Larsen	N/A	Jakob Kjeldbjerg
24	2022	Langkawi, Malaysia	44	21	One tribe of ten and one tribe of eleven	Mikkel Bertelsen	David Martin Tegam Bækhøj; Naja Anna Stencel	N/A	Jakob Kjeldbjerg
25	2023	Langkawi, Malaysia	42	22	Two tribes of eleven. One contestant swapped after first tribal council	Majbritt Fejfer Olsen	Nicole Malanowicz; Pia Kjær	N/A	Jakob Kjeldbjerg
26	2024	Langkawi, Malaysia	42	24	Four tribes of six	Nicolaj Schrøder	Sebastian Sisbo; Helle Pultz	N/A	Jakob Kjeldbjerg
27	2025	Langkawi, Malaysia	41	20	Two tribes of eight formed by schoolyard pick by two contestants after winning opening challenge. First four contestants to drop out of the challenge were sent to Loser's Island where one of them would be the first voted off	Anton Basbas Pedersen	Tanja Pors; Line Bøg Risager	N/A	Jakob Kjeldbjerg
28	2026	Langkawi, Malaysia	40	20	Two tribes of ten	TBA		N/A	Jakob Kjeldbjerg
