= Robinson Ekspeditionen 2007 =

- Season 10
- Presented by: Jakob Kjeldbjerg
- No. of days: 54
- No. of castaways: 20
- Winner: Rikke Gøransson
- Runners-up: Malene Hasselblad; Kenneth Ebert
- Location: Mersing District, Malaysia
- No. of episodes: 12

Release
- Original network: TV3
- Original release: September 17 – December 3, 2007

Season chronology
- ← Previous; 2006 Next → 2008

Robinson Ekspeditionen 2007 (also known as Robinson: Paradise vs Robinson) was the tenth season of the Robinson Ekspeditionen, the Danish version of the Swedish show Expedition Robinson. This season premiered on September 17, 2007 and aired until December 3, 2007.

== Season summary ==
The main twist this season was that every contestant was either an alumnus of previous seasons or of the reality show Paradise Hotel. There weren't any other major twists this season until episode 5 when both Mars Johansen and Michelle Strøyer were voted out together in the sixth tribal council. Following the vote, the two faced off in a duel in order to determine who would return to the game. Mars won the duel and returned to the game.

In episode 6, the Robinson team lost the immunity challenge and faced a double elimination at tribal council. Ivan Larsen and Malene Hasselblad were voted out of the tribe. The next twist occurred in episode 7, just before the merge, when each tribe had to vote out two members. In another twist, in episode 9, Malene Hasselblad, who had been voted out in episode 6, returned to the game. Ultimately, it was Rikke Gøransson from Paradise Hotel 2007 who won the season over former Robinson winner Malene Hasselblad and Paradise Hotel 2007 alumni Kenneth Eber by winning the final challenge.

== Finishing order ==
| Contestant | Original Tribes | Episode 4 Tribes | Merged Tribe | Finish |
|---|---|---|---|---|
| Fatih Sahin; 22, Frederiksberg; Paradise Hotel 2007 | Paradise | | | 1st Voted Out; Day 2 |
| Stig Witzner; 37, Copenhagen season 6, 17th Place | Robinson | | | 2nd Voted Out; Day 6 |
| David Langhoff Jensen; 25, Nørrebro; Paradise Hotel 2006 | Paradise | | | 3rd Voted Out; Day 9 |
| Camilla Sys Thygesen; 22, Copenhagen; Paradise Hotel 2007 | Paradise | | | Left Competition; Day 11 |
| Pia Larsen; 45, Kastrup season 8, 12th Place | Robinson | Robinson | | 4th Voted Out; Day 12 |
| Seckin Cem; 28, Valby season 8, 9th Place | Robinson | Paradise | | 5th Voted Out; Day 15 |
| Michelle Strøyer; 46, Amager season 8, 4th Place | Robinson | Robinson | | 6th Voted Out; Day 18; Lost Duel; Day 19 |
| Mars Johansen; Returned to game | Robinson | Robinson | | 6th Voted Out; Day 21 |
| Ivan Larsen; 37, Amager season 8, 8th Place | Robinson | Robinson | | 7th Voted Out; Day 24 |
| Malene Hasselblad; Returned to game | Robinson | Robinson | | 8th Voted Out; Day 27 |
| Duddie Staack; 54, Østerbro season 7, 3rd Place | Robinson | Robinson | | 9th Voted Out; 1st Jury Member; Day 30 |
| Poul Madsen; 65, Søborg season 4, 9th Place | Robinson | Robinson | | 10th Voted Out; 2nd Jury Member; Day 33 |
| Christine Eleonora Overgaard; 20, Frederiksberg; Paradise Hotel 2007 | Paradise | Paradise | | 11th Voted Out; 3rd Jury Member; Day 36 |
| Sofie Christina Pamer; 21, Amager; Paradise Hotel 2006 | Paradise | Paradise | | 12th Voted Out; 4th Jury Member; Day 39 |
| Naeem Sundoo; 40, Kongens Lyngby season 2, 9th Place | Robinson | Paradise | Robinson | 13th Voted Out; 5th Jury Member; Day 42 |
| Lars "Mars" Johansen; 44, Silkeborg season 4, 8th Place season 5, 21st Place | Robinson | Robinson | Robinson | Won Duel; Day 43; 14th Voted Out; 6th Jury Member; Day 45 |
| Ricco Clausen; 26, Limhamn, Sweden; Paradise Hotel 2006 | Paradise | Paradise | Robinson | 15th Voted Out; 7th Jury Member; Day 48 |
| Camilla Eisenreich; 28, Espergærde; Paradise Hotel 2005 | Paradise | Paradise | Robinson | 16th Voted Out; 8th Jury Member; Day 51 |
| Bjørn Bjarne Jacobsen; 26, Østerbro; Paradise Hotel 2005; Paradise Hotel 2006 | Paradise | Paradise | Robinson | Lost Challenge; 9th Jury Member; Day 53 |
| Kenneth Ebert; 25, Valby; Paradise Hotel 2007 | Paradise | Paradise | Robinson | 2nd Runner-Up; Day 54 |
| Malene Hasselblad; 36, Nørrebro season 4, Sole Survivor | Robinson | Robinson | Robinson | Runner-Up; Day 54 |
| Rikke Gøransson; 21, Smørum; Paradise Hotel 2007 | Paradise | Paradise | Robinson | Sole Survivor; Day 54 |
