= Robinson Ekspeditionen 2015 =

- Season 17
- Presented by: Jakob Kjeldbjerg
- No. of days: 39
- No. of castaways: 24
- Winner: Kenneth Mikkelsen
- Runners-up: Nicole Bech Hansen; Camilla Holm
- Location: Caramoan, Philippines
- No. of episodes: 13

Release
- Original network: TV3
- Original release: 31 August – 23 November 2015

Season chronology
- ← Previous; 2014 Next → 2016

Robinson Ekspeditionen 2015 is the seventeenth season of the Danish reality television series Robinson Ekspeditionen. This season like the last consists of couples competing against each other in Caramoan, Philippines, to try to win 500,000 kr. for themselves while also trying to survive nature and their loved ones. The season premiered on 31 August 2015 and concluded on 23 November 2015 when Kenneth Mikkelsen won in the final challenge against Nicole Bech Hansen and Camilla Holm to win the grand prize and be crowned that year's Robinson winner.

== Finishing order ==
Notable cast members includes Monique von Appen and Tina Bianca Mosekjær Madsen, contestants on Paradise Hotel and Mark Slem Bøgelund, contestant on Big Brother.

Contestant	Original Tribe	Episode 2 Tribe	Episode 3 Tribe	Episode 4 Tribe	Swapped Tribe	Episode 6 Tribe	Merged Tribe	Finish
Jesper Ørnfeld-Jensen; 53, Skibby; Lotte's Husband	South Team							Medically evacuated Day 1
Lotte Ørnfeld-Jensen; 47, Skibby; Jesper's Wife	South Team							Medically evacuated Day 1
Claus Pedersen; Returned to Game	South Team							Lost Duel; Day 1
Noam Valentin Winston Goltermann; 27, Vanløse; Daniel's Boyfriend	North Team							1st Voted Out; Day 4
Bianca Cortes Boesen; 22, Skovlunde; David's Girlfriend	South Team	South Team						Medically evacuated Day 7
Jørn Hulgaard; 56, Valby; Claus' Husband	South Team	South Team						2nd Voted Out; Day 7
David Boesen; 32, Skovlunde; Bianca's Boyfriend	South Team	South Team	South Team					Left Competition; Day 10
Andreas T. Pihl; 30, Aarhus; Tina's Boyfriend	South Team	South Team	South Team					Medically evacuated Day 10
Brian Pedersen; 44, Køge; Lene's Husband	North Team	North Team	North Team					Medically evacuated Day 10
Sanne Wraae Ryttergaard; 33, Løgumkloster; Mikael's Wife	North Team	North Team	North Team					3rd Voted Out; Day 11
Christina Lenschow Hansen; 23, Aarhus; Kenneth's Girlfriend	South Team	South Team	South Team	South Team				4th Voted Out; Day 14
Monique von Appen; 22, Ringsted; Mark's Girlfriend	South Team	South Team	South Team	South Team	South Team			5th Voted Out; Day 17
Mark Slem Bøgelund; 20, Amager; Monique's Boyfriend	South Team	South Team	South Team	North Team	South Team	South Team		Lost Duel; Day 20
Thomas Vig; 29, Frederiksberg; Camilla's Boyfriend	North Team	North Team	North Team	North Team	North Team	North Team	Robinson	Lost Challenge; Day 21
Tina Bianca Mosekjær Madsen; 28, Rønde; Andreas' Girlfriend	South Team	South Team	South Team	North Team	North Team	North Team	Robinson	6th Voted Out; Day 23
Lene Færge Dybbro; 43, Køge; Brian's Wife	North Team	North Team	North Team	North Team	North Team	North Team	Robinson	7th Voted Out; Day 26
Lasse Jensen; 25, Aarhus; Nicole's Boyfriend	North Team	North Team	North Team	North Team	North Team	South Team	Robinson	8th Voted Out; Day 29
Mikael Ryttergaard; 36, Løgumkloster; Sanne's Husband; 2013, 13th Place	North Team	South Team	South Team	South Team	North Team	North Team	Robinson	9th Voted Out; Day 32
Daniel Renneberg Andersen; 27, Vanløse; Noam's Boyfriend	North Team	North Team	North Team	North Team	South Team	South Team	Robinson	Lost Duel; Day 35
Anne "Gøtte" Gøtte Fransson; 36, Kirke Såby; Stefan's Wife	North Team	North Team	North Team	North Team	South Team	South Team	Robinson	Left Competition; Day 35
Stefan Hoff Fransson; 38, Kirke Såby; Gøtte's Husband	North Team	North Team	North Team	North Team	South Team	South Team	Robinson	10th Voted Out; Day 37
Claus Pedersen; 40, Valby; Jørn's Husband	South Team	South Team	South Team	South Team	South Team	South Team	Robinson	Lost Challenge; Day 38
Camilla Holm; 24, Frederiksberg; Thomas' Girlfriend	North Team	North Team	South Team	South Team	South Team	South Team	Robinson	2nd Runner-up; Day 39
Nicole Bech Hansen; 24, Aarhus; Lasse's Girlfriend	North Team	North Team	North Team	North Team	North Team	North Team	Robinson	Runner-up; Day 39
Kenneth Mikkelsen; 25, Aarhus; Christina's Boyfriend	South Team	South Team	North Team	North Team	North Team	North Team	Robinson	Robinson; Day 39
