= Robinson Ekspeditionen 2014 =

- Season 16
- Presented by: Jakob Kjeldbjerg
- No. of days: 39
- No. of castaways: 23
- Winner: Stina Herbenö
- Runners-up: Trine Bang; Henrik Lygteskov
- Location: Caramoan, Philippines
- No. of episodes: 13

Release
- Original network: TV3
- Original release: 25 August – 17 November 2014

Season chronology
- ← Previous; 2013 Next → 2015

Robinson Ekspeditionen 2014 is the sixteenth season of the Danish reality television series Robinson Ekspeditionen. For the first time, host Jakob Kjeldbjerg brings 23 contestants to Caramoan, in the Philippines where almost all of them are competing alongside a friend, a loved one or a relative against one another. For 39 days, they compete for food, rewards, and immunity to survive further into the game to try and win the grand prize of 500,000 kr.. The season premiered on 25 August 2014 and concluded on 17 November 2014 where joker Stina Herbenö won in the final challenge against Trine Bang and Henrik Lygteskov to win the grand prize and the title of Robinson 2014.

== Contestants ==
Notable cast members includes Melissa Gavria Nielsen, contestant on Paradise Hotel and Mikkel Serwin, contestant alongside Nielsen on For lækker til love.

List of Robinson Ekspeditionen 2014 contestants
Contestant	Original Tribe	Joker Enters	First Switched Tribe	Second Switched Tribe	Merged Tribe	Finish
Lisa Møgeltoft Andersen; Returned to Game	North Team					Lost Challenge; Day 1
Kristian Simmelgaard Kristensen; 46, Vandel; Dorthe's Ex-Boyfriend	North Team					1st Voted Out; Day 3
Dennis Nielsen; 41, Taastrup; Anders' Friend	South Team					Medically evacuated Day 4
Nicolai Rømer Wiksten; 26, Køge; Henrik's Friend	South Team					Medically evacuated Day 4
Behrad Moini; 31, Copenhagen; 2013		South Team				2nd Voted Out; Day 6
Charlotte Olesen; 42, Tarm; Germaine's Twin Sister	South Team	South Team	South Team			3rd Voted Out; Day 8
Rikke Bang; 25, Frederikssund; Trine's Twin Sister	North Team	North Team	North Team			Medically evacuated Day 10
Martin Lund; 27, Brøndby Strand; Simone's Friend	South Team	South Team	South Team			Medically evacuated Day 11
Germaine Nielsen; 42, Ådum; 2010; Charlotte's Twin Sister	South Team	South Team	South Team			4th Voted Out; Day 11
Dorthe Graae Lassen; 42, Vandel; Kristian's Ex-Girlfriend	North Team	North Team	North Team	North Team		Medically evacuated Day 12
Torsten Maibomm; 34, Fredensborg; Lasse's Brother	North Team	North Team	North Team	North Team		5th Voted Out; Day 14
Anders Lentini From; 40, Taastrup; Dennis' Friend	South Team	South Team	North Team	North Team	Robinson	6th Voted Out; Day 17
Jeanette Tältmark; 40, Veinge, Sweden; Stina's Friend					Robinson	Medically evacuated Day 20
Melissa Gavria Nielsen; 26, Randers; Mikkel's Girlfriend	North Team	North Team	North Team	South Team	Robinson	Lost Duel; Day 20
Mikkel Serwin; 25, Randers; Melissa's Boyfriend	North Team	North Team	North Team	North Team	Robinson	Quit; Day 22
Lasse "Friis" Fogt; 23, Kolding; Birte's Boyfriend	South Team	South Team	South Team	South Team	Robinson	7th Voted Out; 1st Jury Member; Day 23
Lasse Maibomm Mortensen; 22, Fredensborg; Torsten's Brother	North Team	North Team	South Team	South Team	Robinson	8th Voted Out; 2nd Jury Member; Day 26
Simone Annfeldt; 23, Brøndby Strand; Martin's Friend	South Team	South Team	South Team	South Team	Robinson	Lost Duel; 3rd Jury Member; Day 29
Birte Højsager; 22, Kolding; Friis' Girlfriend	South Team	South Team	South Team	North Team	Robinson	9th Voted Out; 4th Jury Member; Day 32
Christian "Løcke" Rørbæk-Løcke; 29, Randers; Lisa's Boyfriend	North Team	North Team	North Team	North Team	Robinson	10th Voted Out; 5th Jury Member; Day 35
Lisa Møgeltoft Andersen; 22, Randers; Løcke's Girlfriend	North Team	North Team	North Team	South Team	Robinson	Lost Challenge; Day 38
Henrik Lygteskov; 26, Roskilde; Nicolai's Friend	South Team	South Team	South Team	South Team	Robinson	2nd Runner-up; Day 39
Trine Bang; 25, Frederikssund; Rikke's Twin Sister	North Team	North Team	North Team	North Team	Robinson	Runner-up; Day 39
Stina Herbenö; 27, Gothenburg, Sweden; Jeanette's Friend					Robinson	Robinson; Day 39
