= Robinson Ekspeditionen 2002 =

- Season 5
- Presented by: Thomas Mygind
- No. of days: 46
- No. of castaways: 21
- Winner: Henrik Ørum
- Runner-up: Lone Hattesen
- Location: Mensirip Island, Malaysia
- No. of episodes: 14

Release
- Original network: TV3
- Original release: 2 September – 2 December 2002

Season chronology
- ← Previous; 2001 Next → 2003

Robinson Ekspeditionen: 2002 (also known as Robinson Ekspeditionen: Det Endelige Opgør), was the fifth season of the Danish version of the Swedish show Expedition Robinson. It premiered on 2 September 2002 and aired until 2 December 2002.

== Season summary ==
As it was initially thought to be the final season of Robinson Ekspeditionen, it was an "Allstar" version of the show. Twenty-one former contestants from past seasons were chosen to compete in this season. The first twist this season came in episode one when two players from each tribe were exiled away from the game. Whilst these players were exiled, the non-exiled players were led to believe that they had been eliminated from the game. Along with those who were initially exiled, Lasse Rungholm, Lone Hattesen, and Mette Legaard were also sent into exile in episodes one, three, and four, respectively.

In episode 5, all contestants that had been exiled competed in a challenge to determine who would return to the game. As Pia Rosholm lost this challenge, she was eliminated from the game. When it came down to the final three, the public was awarded the right to eliminate one contestant; they chose to eliminate Jørgen Kløcker. Ultimately, it was Henrik Ørum who won the season over Lone Hattesen with a 9–6 jury vote.

== Finishing order ==
| Contestant | Original Tribes | Episode 2 Tribes | Episode 3 Tribes | Episode 4 Tribes | Episode 5 Tribes | Merged Tribe | Finish |
|---|---|---|---|---|---|---|---|
| Pia Rosholm; Sent to Exile | North Team | | | | | | Eliminated by Janne; Day 1 |
| Victorine Pedersen; Sent to Exile | North Team | | | | | | Eliminated by Janne; Day 1 |
| Henrik Hjerl; Sent to Exile | South Team | | | | | | Eliminated by Dan; Day 1 |
| Jørgen Kløcker; Sent to Exile | South Team | | | | | | Eliminated by Dan; Day 1 |
| Lasse Rungholm; Sent to Exile | South Team | | | | | | Eliminated by Dan; Day 1 |
| Lars Johansen; 39, Silkeborg season 4, 8th Place | South Team | | | | | | 1st Voted Out; Day 6 |
| Janne Arusi; Sent to Exile | North Team | North Team | | | | | Eliminated by North Team; Day 7 |
| Lærke Annalia Bregenhøj; 28, Christianshavn; Season 3, 4th Place | North Team | North Team | | | | | 2nd Voted Out; Day 9 |
| Lone Hattesen; Sent to Exile | North Team | North Team | North Team | | | | Eliminated by North Team; Day 11 |
| Hassan Torabi; 41, Nykøbing Falster; Season 1, 7th Place | South Team | South Team | South Team | | | | 3rd Voted Out; Day 12 |
| Mette Legaard; Sent to Exile | North Team | North Team | North Team | | | | Eliminated by North Team; Day 13 |
| Janne Arusi; 42, Fredericia; Season 2, 5th Place | North Team | | North Team | | | | Not Picked for Tribe; Day 15 |
| Martin Vendelboe; 29, Vejle; Season 2, 3rd Place | South Team | South Team | South Team | North Team | | | 4th Voted Out; Day 18 |
| Pia Rosholm; 34, Frederiksberg; Season 3, Runner-Up | North Team | | | | | | Lost Duel; Day 19 |
| Nada Bang; 32, Copenhagen; Season 1, 15th Place | North Team | North Team | North Team | South Team | South Team | | 5th Voted Out; Day 21 |
| Mette Legaard; 40, Aarhus; Season 4, 9th Place | North Team | North Team | North Team | | South Team | | 6th Voted Out; Day 24 |
| Majbritt Edelberg; 26, Copenhagen; Season 4, 18th Place | North Team | North Team | North Team | North Team | North Team | Robinson | Lost Duel; Day 25 |
| Lasse Rungholm; 39, Beder; Season 4, 6th Place | South Team | | | North Team | North Team | Robinson | 7th Voted Out; 1st Jury Member; Day 27 |
| Dan Marstrand; 54, Køge; Season 2, Sole Survivor | South Team | South Team | South Team | South Team | South Team | Robinson | Evacuated; 2nd Jury Member; Day 28 |
| Christina "Tina" Steele; 40, Copenhagen; Season 4, 13th Place | North Team | North Team | North Team | North Team | North Team | Robinson | Lost Duel; 3rd Jury Member; Day 29 |
| Birger Jensen; 34, Copenhagen; Season 3, 13th Place | South Team | South Team | South Team | South Team | South Team | Robinson | 8th Voted Out; 4th Jury Member; Day 30 |
| Jens Romundstad; 30, Kastrup; Season 1, 6th Place | South Team | South Team | South Team | South Team | South Team | Robinson | 9th Voted Out; 5th Jury Member; Day 32 |
| Sonny Rønne Pedersen; 35, Copenhagen; Season 3, Sole Survivor | South Team | South Team | South Team | South Team | South Team | Robinson | 10th Voted Out; 6th Jury Member; Day 33 |
| Christina Vilsøe; 25, Frederiksberg; Season 3, 9th Place | North Team | North Team | North Team | South Team | South Team | Robinson | 11th Voted Out; 7th Jury Member; Day 36 |
| Victorine Njorh Pedersen; 36, Aarhus; Season 3, 16th Place | North Team | North Team | North Team | North Team | North Team | Robinson | 12th Voted Out; 8th Jury Member; Day 39 |
| Henrik Hjerl; 53, Hellerup; Season 1, 16th Place | South Team | | | | North Team | Robinson | 13th Voted Out; 9th Jury Member; Day 42 |
| Jørgen Kløcker; 35, Birkerød; Season 2, 10th Place | South Team | | | | North Team | Robinson | Lost Public Vote; 10th Jury Member; Day 46 |
| Lone Hattesen; 25, Viby J Season 2, 8th Place | North Team | North Team | | | North Team | Robinson | Runner-Up; Day 46 |
| Henrik Ørum; 45, Virum; Season 1, 9th Place | South Team | South Team | South Team | North Team | North Team | Robinson | Sole Survivor; Day 46 |

== Voting history ==
| | Original Tribes | | | | Mixed Tribes | | | Post Gaul | | Merged Tribe | | | | | | | | | | | | |
|---|---|---|---|---|---|---|---|---|---|---|---|---|---|---|---|---|---|---|---|---|---|---|
| Episode #: | 1 | | 2 | 3 | 4 | | 5 | | 6 | 7 | | 8 | 9 | | 10 | 11 | 12 | 13 | | Reunion | | |
| Eliminated: | Henrik H | Mars; 5/8 votes | Lærke; 6/8 votes | Hassan; 0/7 votes | Janne; No vote | Martin; 3/6 votes | Pia; No vote | Nada; 3/7 votes | Mette; 2/6 votes | Majbritt; No vote | Laase; 6/12 votes | Dan; No vote | Tina; No vote | Birger; 4/9 votes | Jens; 2/8 votes | Sonny; 5/7 votes | Christina; 4/6 votes | Victorine ?/5 votes | Henrik H ?/? votes | Jørgen; No vote | Lone ?/? votes^{1} | Henrik Ø ?/? votes^{1} |
| Eliminated: | Pia | Mars; 5/8 votes | Lærke; 6/8 votes | Hassan; 0/7 votes | Janne; No vote | Martin; 3/6 votes | Pia; No vote | Nada; 3/7 votes | Mette; 2/6 votes | Majbritt; No vote | Laase; 6/12 votes | Dan; No vote | Tina; No vote | Birger; 4/9 votes | Jens; 2/8 votes | Sonny; 5/7 votes | Christina; 4/6 votes | Victorine ?/5 votes | Henrik H ?/? votes | Jørgen; No vote | Lone ?/? votes^{1} | Henrik Ø ?/? votes^{1} |
| Eliminated: | Jørgen | Mars; 5/8 votes | Lærke; 6/8 votes | Hassan; 0/7 votes | Janne; No vote | Martin; 3/6 votes | Pia; No vote | Nada; 3/7 votes | Mette; 2/6 votes | Majbritt; No vote | Laase; 6/12 votes | Dan; No vote | Tina; No vote | Birger; 4/9 votes | Jens; 2/8 votes | Sonny; 5/7 votes | Christina; 4/6 votes | Victorine ?/5 votes | Henrik H ?/? votes | Jørgen; No vote | Lone ?/? votes^{1} | Henrik Ø ?/? votes^{1} |
| Eliminated: | Victorine | Mars; 5/8 votes | Lærke; 6/8 votes | Hassan; 0/7 votes | Janne; No vote | Martin; 3/6 votes | Pia; No vote | Nada; 3/7 votes | Mette; 2/6 votes | Majbritt; No vote | Laase; 6/12 votes | Dan; No vote | Tina; No vote | Birger; 4/9 votes | Jens; 2/8 votes | Sonny; 5/7 votes | Christina; 4/6 votes | Victorine ?/5 votes | Henrik H ?/? votes | Jørgen; No vote | Lone ?/? votes^{1} | Henrik Ø ?/? votes^{1} |
| Eliminated: | Laase | Mars; 5/8 votes | Lærke; 6/8 votes | Hassan; 0/7 votes | Janne; No vote | Martin; 3/6 votes | Pia; No vote | Nada; 3/7 votes | Mette; 2/6 votes | Majbritt; No vote | Laase; 6/12 votes | Dan; No vote | Tina; No vote | Birger; 4/9 votes | Jens; 2/8 votes | Sonny; 5/7 votes | Christina; 4/6 votes | Victorine ?/5 votes | Henrik H ?/? votes | Jørgen; No vote | Lone ?/? votes^{1} | Henrik Ø ?/? votes^{1} |
| Voter | Vote | | | | | | | | | | | | | | | | | | | | | |
| Henrik Ø | South | Sonny | | Jens | North | Laase | | | | | Sonny | | | Christina | Sonny | Sonny | Henrik H | ? | ? | Finalist | Jury Vote | |
| Lone | North | | ? | Gaul | | | Won | | | | Sonny | | | Birger | Sonny | Sonny | Christina | ? | ? | Finalist | Jury Vote | |
| Jørgen | Eliminated | Gaul | | | | | | Won | | | Sonny | | Won | Birger | Sonny | Sonny | Christina | ? | ? | Eliminated | | |
| Henrik H | Eliminated | Gaul | | | | | | Won | | | Sonny | | | Birger | Sonny | Sonny | Christina | ? | ? | | | |
| Victorine | Eliminated | Gaul | ? | | North | ? | | | | | Sonny | | | Birger | Sonny | Sonny | Christina | ? | | | | |
| Christina | North | | ? | | South | | | Nada | ? | | Laase | | | Henrik Ø | Jens | Henrik H | Henrik H | | | | | |
| Sonny | South | Mars | | Birger | South | | | Nada | Mette | | Laase | | | Henrik Ø | Jens | Henrik H | | | | | | |
| Jens | South | Sonny | | Birger | South | | | Christina | ? | | Laase | | | Henrik H | Sonny | | | | | | | |
| Birger | South | Mars | | Martin | South | | | Christina | ? | | Laase | | | Henrik Ø | | | | | | | | |
| Tina | North | | ? | | North | ? | | | | | Laase | | Lost | | | | | | | | | |
| Dan | Chief | Mars | | Sonny | Chief | | | Christina | Mette | Won | Laase | | | | | | | | | | | |
| Laase | Eliminated | Gaul | | | North | Martin | | | | | Sonny | | | | | | | | | | | |
| Majbritt | North | | ? | | Chief | Martin | | | | Lost | | | | | | | | | | | | |
| Mette | North | | ? | Gaul | | | Won | Nada | ? | | | | | | | | | | | | | |
| Nada | North | | ? | | South | | | Mette | | | | | | | | | | | | | | |
| Pia | Eliminated | Gaul | | | | | Lost | | | | | | | | | | | | | | | |
| Martin | South | Mars | | Henrik Ø | North | Laase | | | | | | | | | | | | | | | | |
| Janne | Chief | Gaul | | | No Team | | | | | | | | | | | | | | | | | |
| Hassan | South | Mars | | Sonny | | | | | | | | | | | | | | | | | | |
| Lærke | North | | ? | | | | | | | | | | | | | | | | | | | |
| Mars | South | Sonny | | | | | | | | | | | | | | | | | | | | |
