= Robinson Ekspeditionen 2021 =

- Season 22
- Presented by: Jakob Kjeldbjerg
- No. of days: 44
- No. of castaways: 22
- Winner: Katrine Ørskov Hedeman
- Runners-up: Martin Mortensen; Jesper Warburg Larsen
- Location: Las Terrenas, Dominican Republic
- No. of episodes: 14

Release
- Original network: TV3
- Original release: September 6 – November 29, 2021

Season chronology
- ← Previous; 2019 Next → 2022

Robinson Ekspeditionen 2021 is the twenty-second season of the popular Danish reality television series Robinson Ekspeditionen. After a year hiatus due to the COVID-19 pandemic, the season returns with 22 contestants split into two tribes, competing against each other whilst trying to survive. This season moves to a new location, filmed in the Dominican Republic. The season premieres on 6 September 2021.

== Contestants ==
Notable cast members include Amanda Sascha from the reality television series De dyre piger, former football player Martin Svensson, Ralf Østergaard Christensen, husband of television host Lisbeth Østergaard, Ninos Oraha, founder of the popular donut chain Bronuts and Christian Frederik Oxholm Sonne, contestant on The Bar.

List of Robinson Ekspeditionen 2021 contestants
Contestant	Original Tribe	Post Duel Tribe	Swapped Tribe	Merged Tribe	Finish
Asma Saidi; 24, Odense	South Team				Medically Evacuated; Day 1
Tine Skou Larsen; 38, Aarhus	North Team				1st Voted Out; Day 4
Lisa Jørgensen; 33, Køge	North Team	North Team			2nd Voted Out; Day 7
Astrid Hessellund; 46, Nykøbing Falster	South Team	South Team			Medically Evacuated; Day 8
Adelina Igrishta; 23, Aalborg	North Team	North Team			3rd Voted Out; Day 10
Prince Ange Højgaard Gdoublé; 33, Østerbro	North Team	North Team			4th Voted Out; Day 13
Rikke Steen Bagger; 26, Valby	North Team	North Team	North Team		5th Voted Out; Day 17
Christian Frederik Oxholm Sonne; 50, Snekkersten	North Team	North Team	South Team		6th Voted Out; Day 20
Anders Lysholt Cortsen; 37, Højby	South Team	South Team	North Team		7th Voted Out; Day 23
Ida Betina Pedersen; 26, Esbjerg	North Team	North Team	South Team		Lost Duel; Day 25
Frederik Willems; Returned to Game	South Team	South Team	South Team		8th Voted Out; Day 27
Martin Svensson; 31, Vordingborg	North Team	North Team	North Team		Lost Duel; Day 27
Peter Larsen; 55, Skanderborg	South Team	South Team	North Team	Robinson	Lost Duel; Day 28
Frederik Willems; 27, Aarhus	South Team	South Team	South Team	Robinson	9th Voted Out; Day 30
Johannes La Cour Ladegaard; 30, Børkop	South Team	South Team	South Team	Robinson	10th Voted Out; Day 33
Ninos Oraha; 32, Tilst	North Team	South Team	South Team	Robinson	Lost Duel; Day 35
Laila Holme; 41, Greve Strand	North Team	North Team	South Team	Robinson	11th Voted Out; Day 37
Oliver Lawson; 28, Copenhagen	South Team	South Team	South Team	Robinson	Lost Duel; Day 41
Ralf Østergaard Christensen; 43, Copenhagen	South Team	South Team	North Team	Robinson	Lost Challenge; Day 42
Amanda Sascha; 28, Søborg	South Team	South Team	North Team	Robinson	Lost Challenge; Day 43
Jesper Warburg Larsen; 37, Copenhagen	South Team	South Team	North Team	Robinson	2nd Runner-Up; Day 44
Martin Mortensen; 36, Vejle	North Team	North Team	North Team	Robinson	Runner-Up; Day 44
Katrine Ørskov Hedeman; 27, Herlev	South Team	South Team	South Team	Robinson	Robinson; Day 44

== Season summary ==
Episode	Air date	Challenges		Eliminated	Vote	Finish
Episode	Air date	Reward	Immunity	Eliminated	Vote	Finish
Episode 1	6 September 2021	South Team	South Team	Asma	0	Medically Evacuated; Day 1
Episode 1	6 September 2021	South Team	South Team	Tine	7-1-1-1-1-1	1st Voted Out; Day 4
Episode 2	13 September 2021	South Team	South Team	Lisa	7-2	2nd Voted Out; Day 7
Episode 3	20 September 2021	South Team	South Team	Astrid	0	Medically Evacuated; Day 8
Episode 3	20 September 2021	South Team	South Team	Adelina	8-1	3rd Voted Out; Day 10
Episode 4	27 September 2021	South Team	South Team	Prince	6-3	4th Voted Out; Day 13
Episode 5	4 October 2021	South Team	South Team	Rikke	7-1	5th Voted Out; Day 17
Episode 6	11 October 2021	South Team	North Team	Christian	6-5	6th Voted Out; Day 20
Episode 7	18 October 2021	North Team	South Team	Anders	6-2	7th Voted Out; Day 23
Episode 8	25 October 2021	North Team	North Team	Ida	0	Lost Duel; Day 25
Episode 8	25 October 2021	North Team	North Team	Frederik	4-3	8th Voted Out; Day 27
Episode 8	25 October 2021	North Team	North Team	Martin S.	0	Lost Duel; Day 27
Episode 9	1 November 2021					9th Voted Out; Day TBD

== Voting history ==
#	Original Tribe
Episode	1
Voted out	
Votes	
Adelina	
Amanda	
Anders	
Asma	
Astrid	
Christian	
Frederik	
Ida	
Jesper	
Johannes	
Katrine	
Laila	
Lisa	
Martin M	
Martin S	
Ninos	
Oliver	
Peter	
Prince	
Ralf	
Rikke	
Trine	
