= Robinson Ekspeditionen 2008 =

- Season 11
- Presented by: Jakob Kjeldbjerg
- No. of days: 42
- No. of castaways: 22
- Winner: Daniela Hansen
- Runner-up: Hilde Austad
- Location: Mersing District, Malaysia

Release
- Original network: TV3
- Original release: September 1 – November 24, 2008

Season chronology
- ← Previous; 2007 Next → 2009

Robinson Ekspeditionen 2008 (also known as Robinson: Fans vs. Paradise) was the eleventh season of the Danish versions of the Swedish show Expedition Robinson. This season premiered on September 1, 2008 and aired until November 24, 2008.

== Season summary ==
The main twist this season was that every contestant was either a fan of Robinson or was a former contestant on the show Paradise Hotel. The fan tribe was called "Tenga", while the Paradise tribe was called "Sembilang". There were many additional twists this season, the first taking place in episode 1 when all of the contestants were made to take part in an elimination challenge. Mirja Østergaard lost the challenge and was immediately eliminated.

The next twist took place in episode 2 when Jan Novaa, who had been voted out in episode one, returned to the game. The next twist took place in episode 3 when Emil Debski swapped tribes in order to even up the tribe numbers. In episode 4 a larger tribal swap took place in which Jan Novaa, Mads Jensen, and Michelle Jensen swapped from the Sembilang tribe to the Tenga tribe and Emil Debski, Hilde Austad, Martin Persson, Chiro "Sido" Kiarie swapped from the Tenga tribe to the Sembilang tribe.

The next twist came in episode 5 when jokers Laila Neilsen and Nick Zitouni entered the game with Laila joining the Sembilang tribe and Nick joining the Tenga tribe. In episode 6 an individual challenge took place in which the winner would be allowed to eliminate a player from the opposing tribe. Haider Mohamad won the challenge and chose to eliminate Sheila Nymann. Immediately following the merge in episode 7, Haider won the same type of challenge and chose to eliminate Karina Strunge from the game.

The next twist came in episode 10 when contestant Hilde Austad used the "Talisman" she had to void any votes cast against her in tribal council. This led to the elimination of Laila Neilsen who had the second most votes. When it came time for the final four, the remaining contestants competed in two challenges. The winners of these challenges would earn the right to eliminate one of the losers. Emil won the first challenge and chose to eliminate Martin and Daniela won the second challenge and chose to eliminate Emil. Ultimately, it was Daniela Hansen from Paradise Hotel 2006 who won the season over Robinson fan Hilde Austad by a tiebreaking cointoss after the jury vote ended in a 4-4 tie.

== Finishing order ==
Contestant	Original Tribes	Episode 2 Tribes	Episode 3 Tribes	Episode 4 Tribes	Episode 5 Tribes	Merged Tribe	Finish
Bo Esbensen; 48, Hillerød	Tenga						Left Competition; Day 1
Mirja Østergaard; 27, Hørsholm; Paradise Hotel 2006	Sembilang						Lost Challenge; Day 1
Jan Novaa; Returned to game	Tenga						1st Voted Out; Day 3
Jacob Garder Bryde Hansen; 22, Copenhagen; Paradise Hotel 2008	Sembilang	Sembilang					Medically Evacuated; Day 4
Marie Haugaard Nielsen; 26, Aarhus C Paradise Hotel 2007	Sembilang	Sembilang					Evacuated; Day 5
Jeanett Werin; 41, Smørum	Tenga	Tenga					2nd Voted Out; Day 6
Berthel Funch; 43, Værløse	Tenga	Tenga	Tenga				Evacuated; Day 7
Benjamin Knudsen; 26, Hvidovre; Paradise Hotel 2005	Sembilang	Sembilang	Sembilang				Ejected; Day 8
Tina Herluf; 40, Sunds	Tenga	Tenga	Tenga	Tenga			3rd Voted Out; Day 9
Henrik Ljungström; 39, Lundby	Tenga	Tenga	Tenga	Tenga	Tenga		4th Voted Out; Day 12
Sheila Nymann; 25, Holmegård	Tenga	Tenga	Tenga	Tenga	Tenga		Eliminated by Haider; Day 14
Nick Zitouni; 25, Copenhagen; Paradise Hotel 2008					Tenga		5th Voted Out; Day 15
Karina Strunge; 23, Copenhagen; Paradise Hotel 2008	Sembilang	Sembilang	Sembilang	Sembilang	Sembilang	Rapang	Eliminated by Haider; Day 17
Chiro "Sido" Kiarie; 33, Copenhagen	Tenga	Tenga	Tenga	Sembilang	Sembilang	Rapang	6th Voted Out; 1st Jury Member; Day 18
Haider Mohamad; 24, Copenhagen; Paradise Hotel 2008	Sembilang	Sembilang	Sembilang	Sembilang	Sembilang	Rapang	7th Voted Out; 2nd Jury Member; Day 21
Jan Novaa; 41, Copenhagen	Tenga	Sembilang	Sembilang	Tenga	Tenga	Rapang	8th Voted Out; 3rd Jury Member; Day 24
Laila Neilsen; 44, Helsingør					Sembilang	Rapang	9th Voted Out; 4th Jury Member; Day 27
Michelle Byrsting Jensen; 22, Roskilde; Paradise Hotel 2007	Sembilang	Sembilang	Sembilang	Tenga	Tenga	Rapang	10th Voted Out; 5th Jury Member; Day 30
Mads Jensen; 30, Nykøbing Falster; Paradise Hotel 2005	Sembilang	Sembilang	Sembilang	Tenga	Tenga	Rapang	11th Voted Out; 6th Jury Member; Day 33
Martin Persson; 29, Copenhagen	Tenga	Tenga	Tenga	Sembilang	Sembilang	Rapang	12th Voted Out; 7th Jury Member; Day 36
Emil Debski; 23, Odense; Paradise Hotel 2006	Sembilang	Sembilang	Tenga	Sembilang	Sembilang	Rapang	13th Voted Out; 8th Jury Member; Day 39
Hilde Austad; 29, Copenhagen	Tenga	Tenga	Tenga	Sembilang	Sembilang	Rapang	Runner-Up; Day 42
Daniela Hansen; 21, Copenhagen; Paradise Hotel 2006	Sembilang	Sembilang	Sembilang	Sembilang	Sembilang	Rapang	Sole Survivor; Day 42
