= Robinson Ekspeditionen 2011 =

- Season 14
- Presented by: Jakob Kjeldbjerg
- No. of days: 43
- No. of castaways: 27
- Winner: Hugo Kleister
- Runners-up: Morten Kleister; Marlene Thinggaard
- Location: Caramoan, Philippines
- No. of episodes: 13

Release
- Original network: TV3
- Original release: September 5, 2011 – December 2011

Season chronology
- ← Previous; 2010 Next → 2013

Robinson Ekspeditionen 2011 (also known as Robinson: All or Nothing) was the fourteenth season of the Danish version of the Swedish television series Expedition Robinson. This season premiered on September 5, 2011.

== Season summary ==
The first twist this season was that the tribe that lost the first immunity challenge was to be forced to live on the desolate side of the island while the winning tribe lived on a side of the island that had many luxuries and comforts. The only thing separating the two tribes was a wall. The losing tribe was also forced to take part in a large elimination in which half of the tribe will be eliminated from the game (this was later revealed to be a trick as the four people voted out switched tribes).

Among the contestants this season were siblings Karina Andersen and Maria Bruun, who were on the same tribe but kept their relationship a secret from the other contestants. As another twist, this year there was no "Utopia", instead eliminated contestants may be sent to "Guardian Island". On the island eliminated contestants will be forced to battle three guardians of a golden skull for a spot on the island. In episode 2 the two cousins, Hugo and Morten Kleister, entered the game as jokers and joined the recently cut-in-half North team. In episode 3, another joker, Mie Deichmann Jørgensen, also joined the North team, thought shortly after she was voted out of the game. In the same episode another joker, Daniel Broner Jensen, entered the game as a member of the South team, though he too was voted out shortly after due to his poor relationship with some of the other South team members (specifically Allan).

In episode 6, the remaining contestants were asked if they wanted to switch tribes. While only Louise Valbjørn opted to do this, her move proved to be both strategic and game changing as she was able to successfully throw the immunity challenge to her old tribe and convince members of her new tribe to vote out Nima Alijana Hassanlouei. In episode 7, four more jokers, Kit Ruprecht, Marlene Thinggaard, Nicolai Barden, and Zabrina Kondrup, entered the game. Zabrina was well known for her participation in the previous season of Robinson. In episode 8, the guards protecting the golden skull were told that they had to "curse" a contestant. Said contestant would be given a mission to complete and if they failed they would automatically be eliminated from the competition. They chose Brigitte who ultimately passed her mission and was allowed to eliminate two of her fellow competitors (she chose Katrine and Kit). The final three contestants, Marlene Thinggaard and Hugo and Morten Kleister, took part in a final challenge which would determine the winner. Ultimately, Hugo Kleister beat out his cousin Morten and Marlene Thinggaard to win the grand prize of 250,000 Danish krones.

At the end of the season, the three final guardians, all of whom had a key to the cage of the skull, took possession of the skull and with it half of the 500,000 krones prize to split among the four of them. This, however, would not have been true should the guardians have failed their final duel against Hugo, the actual winner of the season. Per faced Hugo in the final duel and won the 250,000 Danish krones for himself and fellow Guardians Patricia Beck, Tommy Kristensen, and Zabrina Kondrup.

== Finishing order ==
Notable cast members includes Jens Porsmose Kristensen, former contestant on Total Blackout.

Contestant	Original tribe	Episodes 2-5	Second Swap	Merged tribe	Finish
Nima Alijana Hassanlouei; Returned to game	North Team				1st Voted Out; Day 3
Jens Porsmose Kristensen; Returned to game	North Team				2nd Voted Out; Day 3
Katrine Munk Görnandt; Returned to game	North Team				3rd Voted Out; Day 3
Dinna Henriksen; Returned to game	North Team				4th Voted Out; Day 3
Karina Andersen; 27, Amager	South Team				Left Competition; Day 4
Maria Bruun; 23, Amager	South Team				Left Competition; Day 4
Tanja Vesterby Mortensen; 37, Ringsted	South Team				Left Competition; Day 4
Tina Vilbrand; 38, Copenhagen	South Team				Left Competition; Day 4
Michael Juel Sjøstrøm; 34, Copenhagen	North Team	North Team			Left Competition; Day 5
Per Møller; 35, Hjørring	North Team	North Team			5th Voted Out; Day 6
Jens Porsmose Kristensen; 23, Nørre Nebel	North Team	South Team			Left Competition; Day 8
Stevan Svadil; 36, Copenhagen	South Team	South Team			6th Voted Out; Day 9
Mie Deichmann Jørgensen; 24, Copenhagen		North Team			Left Competition; Day 11
Jimmy Brandt; 26, Copenhagen	South Team	South Team			7th Voted Out; Day 13
Henrik Erentz; 53, Frederiksværk	South Team	South Team			Left Competition; Day 16
Daniel Broner Jensen; 21, Odense		South Team			8th Voted Out; Day 17
Nima Alijana Hassanlouei; 28, Valby	North Team	South Team	South Team		9th Voted Out; Day 20
Zabrina Natasja Kondrup; 24, Kalundborg; Season 13, 3rd Place				Robinson	10th Voted Out; Day 24
Allan Djurhuus; 30, Aalborg	South Team	South Team	South Team	Robinson	11th Voted Out; Day 28
Dinna Henriksen; 26, Næstved	North Team	South Team	South Team	Robinson	12th Voted Out; Day 32
Katrine Munk Görnandt; 35, Valby	North Team	South Team	South Team	Robinson	Eliminated by Brigitte; Day 36
Kit Ruprecht; 21, Brønshøj				Robinson	Eliminated by Brigitte; Day 36
Louise Valbjørn; 23, Copenhagen	North Team	North Team	South Team	Robinson	13th Voted Out; Day 40
Birgitte Thagaard; 42, Frederikshavn	North Team	North Team	North Team	Robinson	14th Voted Out; Day 41
Nicolai Baden; 36, Fredericia				Robinson	15th Voted Out; Day 42
Marlene Thinggaard; 29, Odense				Robinson	2nd-Runner-Up; Day 43
Morten Kleister; 39, Gundesbøl		North Team	North Team	Robinson	Runner-Up; Day 43
Hugo Kleister; 29, Hoven		North Team	North Team	Robinson	Sole Survivor; Day 43

== Guardian Island ==
Contestant	Position	Finish
Allan Djurhuus; 30, Aalborg	Challenger	
Dinna Henriksen; 26, Næstved	Challenger	
Daniel Broner Jensen; 21, Odense	Challenger	
Niels Larsen; 25, Vanløse	Guardian	
Nima Alijana Hassanlouei; 28, Valby	Challenger	
Jimmy Brandt; 26, Copenhagen	Challenger	
Louise Valbjørn; 23, Copenhagen	Challenger	
Katrine Munk Görnandt; 35, Valby	Challenger	
Kit Ruprecht; 21, Brønshøj	Challenger	
Stevan Svadil; 36, Copenhagen	Challenger	
Patricia Beck; 30, Vanløse	Guardian	Won Final Duel; 250,000 Krones
Per Møller; 35, Hjørring	Challenger	Won Final Duel; 250,000 Krones
Tommy Kristensen; 37, Vanløse	Guardian	Won Final Duel; 250,000 Krones
Zabrina Natasja Kondrup; 24, Kalundborg; Season 13, 3rd Place	Challenger	Won Final Duel; 250,000 Krones
