= Danmarks Modigste =

- Genre: Reality
- Presented by: Jakob Kjeldbjerg
- Country of origin: Denmark
- Original language: Danish
- No. of seasons: 1
- No. of episodes: 10

Original release
- Network: TV3

Danmarks Modigste (English: Denmark's Bravest) is a Danish reality show in which 16 people from all over Denmark compete in challenges that requires courage in order to pass challenges in order to be safe from elimination. The grand prize is kr.500,000. The show premiered on March 13, 2017, on TV3.

== Seasons ==
Season	Year	Channel	Participants	Winner
One	2017	TV3	16	Kenny Oestrich
