= Expedition Robinson 2005 (VIP) =

- Season 2005
- Presented by: Mikkel Beha Erichsen (Denmark); Christer Falck (Norway); Robert Aschberg (Sweden)
- No. of days: 14
- No. of castaways: 15
- Winner: Tilde Fröling
- Runner-up: Jan Simonsen
- Location: Malaysia
- No. of episodes: 10

Release
- Original network: TV3 (Denmark, Norway, Sweden)
- Original release: 16 January – 20 March 2005

Season chronology
- ← Previous; 2004 (Denmark); 2004 (Norway); 2004 (Sweden) Next → 2005 (Denmark); 2007 (Norway); 2005 (Sweden)

Expedition Robinson VIP, also known as Robinson: Landskamp or Robinson VIP, is the first celebrity version of Expedition Robinson to air in Scandinavia and it aired in 2005. This was also one of the first editions of Expedition Robinson in which more than one country participated as Denmark, Norway, and Sweden were each represented by five of the fifteen celebrities who took part.

== Season summary ==
As part of the multi-country twist this season the contestants were divided into tribes based on their countries of origin. As each country had to be represented in the final, the last remaining member of each tribe would automatically advance to the final and, depending on when they became the last member of their tribe, would be given immunity from all remaining eliminations. When it came time to vote for a winner all eliminated contestants were given the option to vote between the two finalists from the other countries' tribes. Eventually Swedish celebrity Tilde Fröling won the season by a jury vote of 5-4-3 over Norwegian celebrity Jan Simonsen and Danish celebrity Asbjørn Riis.

== Finishing order ==
Contestant	Original Tribes	Merged Tribe	Finish
Gry "J-Diva" Jannicke Jarlum; 42, Singer	Norge		1st Voted Out; 1st Jury Member; Day 2
Lene Elise Bergum; 28, Actress	Norge		2nd Voted Out; 2nd Jury Member; Day 3
Denise Lopez; 32, Singer	Sverige		3rd Voted Out; 3rd Jury Member; Day 4
Anne Larsen; 51, TV Chef	Danmark		4th Voted Out; 4th Jury Member; Day 5
Asbjørn Riis; Returned to Game	Danmark	Robinson	5th Voted Out; Day 7
Frederik Fetterlein; 34, Monaco; Former Tennis Player	Danmark	Robinson	6th Voted Out; 5th Jury Member; Day 8
Warny Mandrup; 38, Actor	Danmark	Robinson	7th Voted out 6th Jury Member; Day 9
Saseline Sørensen; 21, Singer	Danmark	Robinson	Left Competition; 7th Jury Member; Day 10
Mårten Andersson; 30, Comedian	Sverige	Robinson	8th Voted Out; 8th Jury Member; Day 11
Janne Rønningen; 28, Comedian	Norge	Robinson	9th Voted Out; 9th Jury Member; Day 12
Frank Andersson; 48, Former Wrestler	Sverige	Robinson	Lost Challenge; 10th Jury Member; Day 13
Peter Wahlbeck; 41, Comedian	Sverige	Robinson	Lost Challenge; 11th Jury Member; Day 13
Ole Klemetsen; 33, Former Boxer	Norge	Robinson	Lost Challenge; 12th Jury Member; Day 13
Asbjørn Riis; 46, Professional Wrestler	Danmark	Robinson	Second-Runner-Up; Day 14
Jan Simonsen; 51, Politician	Norge	Robinson	Runner-Up; Day 14
Tilde Fröling; 24, Actress	Sverige	Robinson	Sole Survivor; Day 14

== Episode guide ==
Episode	Air date	Challenges		Eliminated	Finish
Episode	Air date	Reward	Immunity	Eliminated	Finish
1	21 January 2005		Sverige	J-Diva	1st Voted Out; 1st Jury Member; Day ?
1	21 January 2005		Danmark	J-Diva	1st Voted Out; 1st Jury Member; Day ?
2	28 January 2005		Sverige	Lene^{1}	2nd Voted Out; 2nd Jury Member; Day ?
2	28 January 2005		Danmark	Lene^{1}	2nd Voted Out; 2nd Jury Member; Day ?
3	4 February 2005		Danmark^{2}	Denise	3rd Voted Out; 3rd Jury Member; Day ?
3	4 February 2005		Norge	Denise	3rd Voted Out; 3rd Jury Member; Day ?
4	11 February 2005	Sverige	Sverige^{2}	Anne	4th Voted Out; 4th Jury Member; Day ?
4	11 February 2005	Sverige	Norge	Anne	4th Voted Out; 4th Jury Member; Day ?
5	18 February 2005		Frank	Asbjørn	~~5th Voted Out~~; ~~Day ?~~
6	25 February 2005		Warny	Frederik	6th Voted Out; 5th Jury Member; Day ?
6	25 February 2005	Saseline		Frederik	6th Voted Out; 5th Jury Member; Day ?
7	4 March 2005		Ole	Warny	7th Voted Out; 6th Jury Member; Day ?
8	11 March 2005		Ole	Saseline	Left Competition; 7th Jury Member; Day ?
8	11 March 2005		Ole	Mårten	8th Voted Out; 8th Jury Member; Day ?
9	18 March 2005		Peter	Janne	9th Voted Out; 9th Jury Member; Day ?
10	25 March 2005		Tilde	Frank	Lost Challenge; 10th Jury Member; Day ?
10	25 March 2005		Tilde	Peter	Lost Challenge; 11th Jury Member; Day ?
10	25 March 2005		Jan	Ole	Lost Challenge; 12th Jury Member; Day ?
10	25 March 2005	Jury Vote		Asbjørn	Second Runner-Up
10	25 March 2005	Jury Vote		Jan	Runner-Up
10	25 March 2005	Jury Vote		Tilde	Sole Survivor
Notes:^1 After the vote resulted in a tie, the tribe leaders had to agree together on which to eliminate, in which they chose Lene.^2.The winning tribe got to choose which tribe would partake in the Tribal Council.

== Voting history ==
	Original Tribes				Merged Tribe										
Vote #:	1	2	3	4	5	6	7	8		9	10				
Eliminated:	J-Diva; 4/7 votes	Lene Elise; 3/6 votes	Denise; 4/7 votes	Anne; 4/7 votes	Asbjørn; 5/11 votes	Frederik; 6/10 votes	Warny; 6/9 votes	Saseline; No vote	Mårten; 5/8 votes	Janne; 4/7 votes	Frank, Peter; No vote	Ole; No vote	Asbjørn; 3/8 votes	Jan; 4/8 votes	Tilde; 5/8 votes
Voter	Vote														
Tilde			Denise		Asbjørn	Frederik	Warny		Mårten	Janne	Won	Immune	Jury Vote		
Jan	Janne	Janne			Asbjørn	Frederik	Warny		Mårten	Janne	Lost	Won	Jury Vote		
Asbjørn				Anne	Ole				Mårten	Janne	Immune		Jury Vote		
Ole	J-Diva	Janne			Asbjørn	Frederik	Warny		Mårten	Janne	Lost	Eliminated			Tilde
Peter			Denise		Frederik	Frederik	Warny		Janne	Jan	Eliminated			Jan	
Frank			Mårten		Warny	Frederik	Warny		Mårten	Jan	Eliminated		Asbjørn		
Janne	Lene Elise	Lene Elise			Asbjørn	Ole	Tilde		Peter	Ole					Tilde
Mårten			Denise		Asbjørn	Frederik	Warny		Frank					Jan	
Saseline				Anne	Ole	Frank	Frank								Tilde
Warny				Anne	Ole	Frank	Frank							Jan	
Frederik				Anne	Ole	Frank								Jan	
Anne				Warny											Tilde
Denise			Peter										Asbjørn		
Lene Elise	J-Diva	Janne													Tilde
J-Diva	Janne												Asbjørn		
Danmark	J-Diva	Lene Elise	Peter												
Norge			Denise	Frederik											
Sverige	J-Diva	Lene Elise		Frederik											
