= Robinson Ekspeditionen 2006 =

- Season 9
- Presented by: Jakob Kjeldbjerg
- No. of days: 25
- No. of castaways: 16
- Winner: Diego Tur
- Runner-up: Denise Dupont
- Location: Pearl Islands, Panama

Release
- Original network: TV3
- Original release: 4 September – 21 November 2006

Season chronology
- ← Previous; 2005 Next → 2007

Robinson Ekspeditionen 2006 (also known as Robinson: Eliten) was the ninth season of the Danish versions of the Swedish show Expedition Robinson. This season premiered on September 4, 2006, and aired until November 21, 2006.

== Season summary ==
The main twist this season was that every contestant was a well-known athlete in a sport. Along with this twist, this season contestants would not be eliminated by the result of tribal council voting, but by the result of duels between two contestants from the same tribe. This means that this season following the vote at tribal council, the voted-out player would pick one of their fellow tribe member to face off with in a duel to determine which would stay in the game. Once the two tribes merged, the twist of "Utopia" returned to the game. In Utopia all eliminated players would compete in a series of duels in order to earn a spot in the final four. Nicole Sydbøge won the final duel and returned to the game.

In a final twist, there was no jury this season; instead in order to keep with the athletic theme of the season the final four competed in a series of challenges in order to determine a winner. In the end, it was Diego Tur who won the season over Denise Dupont after winning the final challenge.

== Finishing order ==
Contestant	Original Tribes	Merged Tribe	Finish
Rene Minkwitz; 36, Copenhagen	South Team		Evacuated; Day ?
Charlotte Krøyer; 27, Copenhagen	North Team		Lost Duel; Day ?
Thor Nielsen; 46, Kongens Lyngby	North Team		Lost Duel; Day ?
Helene Elmer; 37, Karlslunde	North Team		Lost Duel; Day ?
Søren Lilholt; 40, Rødovre	North Team		Lost Duel; Day ?
Johnny Bredahl; 37, Frederiksberg	North Team		Left Competition; Day ?
Thomas Steen; 37, Risskov	South Team		Lost Duel; Day ?
Michael Smidt; 26, Rødovre	North Team	Robinson	Lost Duel; Day ? Lost Duel; Day ?
Tanja Fogtmann; 25, Copenhagen	South Team	Robinson	Lost Duel; Day ? Lost Duel; Day ?
Merete Pedersen; 32, Rome, Italy	South Team	Robinson	Lost Duel; Day ? Lost Duel; Day ?
Nicole Sydbøge; Returned to game	North Team	Robinson	Lost Duel; Day ?
Anja Bolbjerg; 35, Hillerød	North Team	Robinson	Lost Duel; Day ? Lost Duel; Day ?
Lars Christensen; 42, Copenhagen	South Team	Robinson	Lost Duel; Day ?
Marie Pilgaard; 40, Aarhus	South Team	Robinson	Lost Challenge; Day ?
Nicole Sydbøge; 30, Copenhagen	North Team	Robinson	Lost Challenge; Day ?
Denise Dupont; 22, Frederiksberg	South Team	Robinson	Runner-Up; Day 25
Diego Tur; 34, Frederiksberg	South Team	Robinson	Sole Survivor; Day 25
