= Martin Svensson =

Martin Svensson may refer to:

- Martin Svensson (singer) (born 1978), Swedish singer, author and musician
- Martin Svensson (footballer) (born 1989), Danish footballer
