= Robinson Ekspeditionen 2019 =

- Season 2019
- Presented by: Jakob Kjeldbjerg
- No. of days: 44
- No. of castaways: 22
- Winner: Nis Andreas Prio Sørensen
- Runners-up: Kenneth Jørgensen; Jaffer Naveed Janjooa
- Location: Caramoan, Philippines
- No. of episodes: 13

Release
- Original network: TV3
- Original release: 26 August – 18 November 2019

Season chronology
- ← Previous; 2018 Next → 2021

Robinson Ekspeditionen 2019 is the twenty-first season of the Danish version of the Swedish reality television series Expedition Robinson. This season, twenty-two contestants are taken to the Philippines where, for the first time since 2015, two tribes compete against each other to win challenges and immunity. After forty-four days, one of them will win and become this year's Robinson winner. The season premiered on 26 August 2019.

== Finishing order ==
Contestant	Original Tribe	Post-Kidnap Tribe	Swapped Tribe	Merged Tribe	Finish
Michelle Moeslund; 34, Galten	South Team				Medically evacuated Day 4
Bille Bay; 27, Canggu, Indonesia	South Team				1st Voted Out; Day 4
Mercedes Julie Kryger Nordvi; 28, Frederiksberg	North Team				2nd Voted Out; Day 7
Lars Gade Christensen; 29, Vejle	North Team				Left Competition; Day 9
Nadia Otte; 28, Frederiksberg	North Team				3rd Voted Out; Day 10
Dina Helbo Bredal; 40, Silkeborg	North Team	North Team			4th Voted Out; Day 14
Mette Gybel; 25, Hvidovre	South Team	South Team			Lost Duel; Day 18
Louise "Guldberg" Guldberg; 24, Sønderborg	South Team	South Team			Not Picked; Day 19
Baris Balo Bicen; 25, Albertslund	North Team	North Team	South Team		5th Voted Out; Day 21
Louise Camilla Haustrup; 30, Copenhagen	South Team	South Team	South Team		Left Competition; Day 24
Henrik Haack; 44, Holbæk	North Team	North Team	South Team		Lost Duel; Day 25
Jess Høeg; 51, Roskilde	South Team	South Team	South Team		6th Voted Out; Day 27
Heidi Qvortrup; 30, Aarhus	North Team	North Team	North Team		7th Voted Out; Day 29
Michael Bjørnlund; 43, Valby	North Team	North Team	North Team	Robinson	8th Voted Out; Day 31
Steffen Arndt Bech Nielung; 30, Glostrup	North Team	North Team	North Team	Robinson	9th Voted Out; 1st Jury Member; Day 34
Jeppe Nicolaisen; 45, Copenhagen	South Team	South Team	North Team	Robinson	10th Voted Out; 2nd Jury Member; Day 37
Camilla Hoe Enevoldsen; 30, Copenhagen	North Team	North Team	North Team	Robinson	11th Voted Out; 3rd Jury Member; Day 40
Kristina Rimkolde; 40, Vejen	South Team	South Team	North Team	Robinson	Lost Duel; Day 42
Maria Pencheri; 26, Aarhus	North Team	South Team	South Team	Robinson	Lost Duel; Day 43
Jaffer Naveed Janjooa; 29, Brøndby Strand	South Team	South Team	South Team	Robinson	2nd Runner-up; Day 44
Kenneth Jørgensen; 29, Løgstør	South Team	South Team	South Team	Robinson	Runner-up; Day 44
Nis Andreas Prio Sørensen; 25, Copenhagen	South Team	South Team	North Team	Robinson	Robinson; Day 44
