= Robinson Ekspeditionen 2009 =

- Season 12
- Presented by: Jakob Kjeldbjerg
- No. of days: 46
- No. of castaways: 24
- Winner: Villy Knaack Eenberg
- Runners-up: Maureen Cruz; Nicolai Karlson
- Location: Mersing District, Malaysia

Release
- Original network: TV3
- Original release: August 31 – November 23, 2009

Season chronology
- ← Previous; 2008 Next → 2010

Robinson Ekspeditionen 2009 was the twelfth season of the Danish version of the Swedish show Expedition Robinson. This season premiered on August 31, 2009, and aired until November 23, 2009.

== Overview ==
The main twist this season was that the contestants were to be divided up into tribes based on the results of an IQ test they took before the show. The season began with four players exiting in episode 1, only one of which was eliminated. The first of these four was Jesper Nyeland Andersen, who was evacuated for medical reasons before the tribes were formed. Then siblings Michael Kristiansen and Sascha Kristiansen both refused to compete in the first immunity challenge and decided to leave the show shortly after it concluded.

Beginning with the elimination of Andrew Prasana in episode 3 to the merge, all contestants voted out of the game were sent to "Utopia", where following the merge, they would compete to return to the game. In another twist, a joker, Maureen Cruz, entered the game in episode 5 to replace the mole Gerard "Anders" Hansen, who had been ejected from the game in episode 4 as the end of the first part of the mole twist. Another twist that took place in episode 5 was that the tribes were shuffled and given new names (Mensirip and Tenga). Another twist that took place in episode 5 was that of the replacement mole. The producers asked each contestant if they wanted to be the new mole and out of those who said yes the producers chose to make Ditte Jensen the new mole. As part of this new twist, only Ditte was allowed to vote at the next tribal council.

Prior to the merge in episode 7, the remaining twelve contestants took part in a challenge to determine who would make the merge. Ultimately, Kim Duelund and Mira Thomsen lost the challenge and were eliminated. In episode 8, Ditte, like the first mole Anders, was ejected from the game. In episode 9, instead of a tribal council, five of the contestants took place in an elimination challenge. Jan Andersem lost the challenge and was eliminated from the game. In episode 10, Rasmus had to be evacuated from the game after collapsing from exhaustion. Shortly after Jan's evacuation, the remaining contestants took part in an elimination challenge. Sandra Adelheid lost the challenge and was eliminated from the game. In episode 11, the contestants competed in another elimination challenge. Villy Eenberg lost the challenge and was sent to utopia. Eileen Pehrsson, who was voted out in the same episode, also was sent to utopia.

In the final episode of the season, the remaining contestants in utopia took part in a final duel which Villy won. The final five then competed in a series of challenges which ultimately led to the elimination of Andrew and Søren Petersen. Ultimately, it was Villy Eenberg, who had been eliminated twice throughout the competition, who won the season over Maureen Cruz and Nicolai Karlson by winning the final challenge.

== Finishing order ==
Contestant	Original Tribes	Episode 3 Tribes	Episode 5 Tribes	Merged Tribe	Finish
Jesper Nyeland Andersen; 34, Copenhagen	None				Evacuated; Day 1
Sascha Bredgaard Kristiansen; 22, Odense	Smart Tribe				Left Competition; Day 2
Michael Kristiansen; 33, Varde	Dumb Tribe				Left Competition; Day 2
Trine Lindaborg; 21, Valby	Dumb Tribe				Left Competition; Day 2
Anita Christensen; 33, Copenhagen	Dumb Tribe				1st Voted Out; Day 3
Kenneth Jensen; 23, Roskilde	Dumb Tribe				2nd Voted Out; Day 6
Andrew Prasana; Returned to game	Smart Tribe	Smart Tribe			3rd Voted Out; Day 9
Gerard "Anders" Hansen; 40, Copenhagen	Smart Tribe	Smart Tribe			Ejected; Day 11
Linda Gaisie; Returned to game	Smart Tribe	Smart Tribe			4th Voted Out; Day 12
Rasmus Bjerregaard; Returned to game	Dumb Tribe	Dumb Tribe	Mensirip		5th/6th Voted Out; Day 15
Therese Gry Trebbien; Returned to game	Smart Tribe	Smart Tribe	Mensirip		5th/6th Voted Out; Day 15
Villy Eenberg; Returned to game	Smart Tribe	Smart Tribe	Mensirip		7th Voted Out; Day 18
Mira Thomsen; 27, Glostrup	Smart Tribe	Smart Tribe	Mensirip		Lost Challenge; Day 20
Kim Duelund; 44, Hillerød	Smart Tribe	Smart Tribe	Tenga		Lost Challenge; Day 20
Lotte Ebdrup; 32, Copenhagen	Smart Tribe	Smart Tribe	Mensirip	Robinson	8th Voted Out; 1st Jury Member; Day 21
Nicolai Kraul; 25, Copenhagen	Smart Tribe	Smart Tribe	Tenga	Robinson	9th Voted Out; 2nd Jury Member; Day 24
Ditte Jensen; 32, Frederiksberg	Dumb Tribe	Dumb Tribe	Tenga	Robinson	Ejected; 3rd Jury Member; Day 25
Jan Andersen; 45, Nørresundby	Smart Tribe	Smart Tribe	Mensirip	Robinson	10th Voted Out; 4th Jury Member; Day 27
Rasmus Bjerregaard; 37, Køge	Dumb Tribe	Dumb Tribe	Mensirip	Robinson	Won Duel; Day 28; Evacuated; 5th Jury Member; Day 29
Sandra Adelheid; 19, Horsens	Dumb Tribe	Dumb Tribe	Tenga	Robinson	Lost Challenge; 6th Jury Member; Day 30
Therese Gry Trebbien; 25, Smørum	Smart Tribe	Smart Tribe	Mensirip	Robinson	Won Duel; Day 28; 11th Voted Out; 7th Jury Member; Day 33
Villy Eenberg; Returned to game	Smart Tribe	Smart Tribe	Mensirip	Robinson	Lost Challenge; Day 34
Eileen Pehrsson; Returned to game	Dumb Tribe	Dumb Tribe	Mensirip	Robinson	12th Voted Out; Day 36
Johannes Vasco Lockwood; 23, Frederiksberg	Dumb Tribe	Dumb Tribe	Mensirip	Robinson	13th Voted Out; 8th Jury Member; Day 39
Linda Gaisie; 26, Copenhagen	Smart Tribe	Smart Tribe			Lost Final Duel; Day 41
Eileen Pehrsson; 37, Vojens	Dumb Tribe	Dumb Tribe	Mensirip		Lost Final Duel; Day 41
Andrew Prasana; 23, Holbæk	Smart Tribe	Smart Tribe		Robinson	Won Duel; Day 41; Lost Challenge; 9th Jury Member; Day 42
Søren Petersen; 35, Stenstrup	Dumb Tribe	Dumb Tribe	Tenga	Robinson	Lost Challenge; 10th Jury Member; Day 43
Nicolai Karlson; 25, Taastrup	Dumb Tribe	Dumb Tribe	Tenga	Robinson	2nd-Runner-Up; Day 46
Maureen Cruz; 27, Copenhagen			Tenga	Robinson	Runner-Up; Day 46
Villy Knaack Eenberg; 53, Klippinge	Smart Tribe	Smart Tribe	Mensirip	Robinson	Won Final Duel; Day 41; Sole Survivor; Day 46
