= Biker-Jens =

Danish television personality

Jens Romundstad
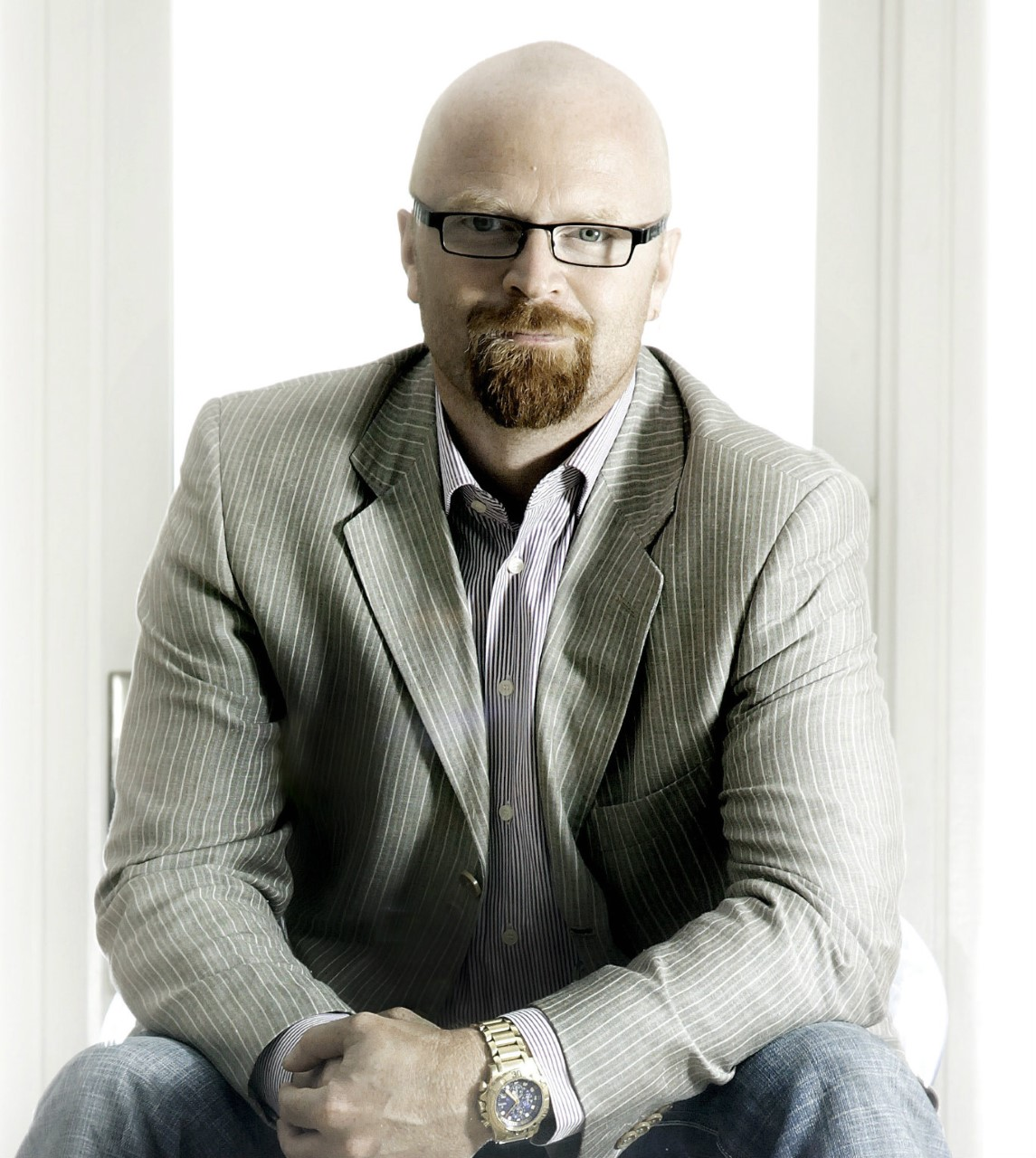
- Born: 1971 (age 53–54)

Jens Romundstad, commonly known as Biker-Jens (born 1971) is a Danish television personality. He is a former professional soldier and educated Civiløkonom (literally "civil economist"). In 2002, he served in Kyrgyzstan with the Royal Danish Air Force in mission Enduring Freedom. Currently he is employed by COOP.

In his spare time, he gives frequent lectures about communication, branding and health management.

== Robinson Ekspeditionen ==
Jens participated in Denmark's first version of Survivor, called Robinson Ekspeditionen in 1998, and later participated in "the final showdown" with some of the contestants returning in 2002, losing a close draw just before the finals in both cases. After Robinson Ekspeditionen, Biker-Jens gained a lot of local fame, and made several travel programs for Danish TV Danmark and TV3+. Biker Jens' travel documentaries from the United States, the Far East and Australia are the most re-run TV-series ever broadcast in Denmark.

== Biker Jens in the United States ==
His most famous show, Biker Jens in the USA, is a travel documentary series, where he rode a Harley-Davidson motorcycle from Key West, Florida, to San Francisco, California. During the 3½ month ride he experienced the extremes as well as everyday life in the States. He tried everything from alligator-wrestling to gatecrashing a Ku Klux Klan meeting, while also meeting a handful of Danes living in America and having successful careers, such as NFL kicker Morten Andersen, Metallica drummer Lars Ulrich, and actor/stuntman Sven-Ole Thorsen. The show became the No. 1 show on TV Danmark in late 1999, and he signed a new contract with the TV channel to make two more travel documentary series, that would take place in Asia and Australia. They were both filmed and aired in 2000. After driving 45,000 km on Harley-Davidsons within 1½ years, Romundstad started a career as team builder, but then later returned to the screen to host the Danish version of Fear Factor, filmed in South Africa in 2002.

In 2003 he went back to the US for TV3 to film the series Biker Jens - A Life on the Edge, where he examined extreme lifestyles, not only describing it, but actually living the life himself, as a stunt driver, male stripper, human cannonball, pro wrestler, rodeo cowboy, bullfighter, rapper, freediver and a homeless person. He was injured several times during the filming, but was later awarded the "Brigitte Bardot International Award" at the Humane Society of the United States' "Genesis Award" Ceremony in 2003, for the episode about bullfighting in Mexico.
