= Robinson Ekspeditionen 2010 =

- Season 13
- Presented by: Jakob Kjeldbjerg
- No. of days: 51
- No. of castaways: 24
- Winner: Søren Engelbret
- Runners-up: Hans Ole Ravnholt; Zabrina Natasja Kondrup
- Location: Mersing District, Malaysia
- No. of episodes: 16

Release
- Original network: TV3
- Original release: September 6 – December 13, 2010

Season chronology
- ← Previous; 2009 Next → 2011

Robinson Ekspeditionen 2010 was the thirteenth season of the Danish version of the Swedish show Expedition Robinson. This season premiered on September 6, 2010.

== Contestants ==
Contestant	Original Tribe	Mixed Tribes	Merged Tribe	Finish	Utopia
Vincent Jonathan Muir; 22, Copenhagen	None			Lost Challenge; Day 1	Lost 1st Duel; Day ?
Germaine Nielsen; Returned to game	Tenga			1st Voted Out; Day 3	
Daniell Edwards; 29, Hvidovre	Minang	Minang		3rd Voted Out; Day 9	Lost 2nd Duel; Day ?
Ali Ghiace; 25, Svendborg	Minang	Tenga		Left Competition; Day 11	
Gitte Maagaard Pedersen; 27, Hellerup	None			Lost Challenge; Day 1	Lost 3rd Duel; Day ?
Charlotte Schou; 21, Rønne	Tenga	Tenga		4th Voted Out; Day 12	Lost 4th Duel; Day ?
Diana Seolberg Andersen; Returned to game	Tenga	Tenga		5th Voted Out; Day 15	
Ann Østerby Appelgren; 33, Ørestaden	Minang	Minang		Lost Challenge; Day ?	Lost 5th Duel; Day ?
Nini Louise Gøthler; 22, Herlev	Minang	Minang		Evacuated; Day ?	
Bjørn "Pappi" Lambertsen; 33, Vallensbæk Strand	Minang	Tenga		Lost Challenge; Day ?	Lost 6th Duel; Day ?
Germaine Nielsen; 38, Ådum	Tenga		Robinson	Lost Challenge; Day ?	
Anja Mia Balle; 34, Helsingør	None		Robinson	Lost Challenge; Day 1 Lost Challenge; Day 23	Lost 7th Duel; Day ?
Maiken Holmark Dyrskjøt Andersen; 18, Hirtshals	Tenga	Tenga		Lost Challenge; Day 28	Lost 8th Duel; Day ?
Reda Zamzam; 30, Aarhus	Minang	Tenga	Robinson	7th Voted Out; Day 21; 10th Voted Out; Day 30	Lost 9th Duel; Day ?
Hans "HC" Christian Nørager Poulsen; 29, Copenhagen	Tenga	Minang	Robinson	Lost Challenge; Day ?	Lost 10th Duel; Day ?
Gitte Benherdt; 41, Glostrup	Minang	Tenga	Robinson	13th Voted Out; Day 39	Lost Final Duel; Day 49
Diana Seolberg Andersen; 24, Køge	Tenga	Minang	Robinson	9th Voted Out; Day 27	Lost Final Duel; Day 49
Jens Flarup Bach; 40, Copenhagen	Minang	Minang		6th Voted Out; Day 18	Lost Final Duel; Day 49
Mette Ahrenkiel Egeberg; 28, Copenhagen	Minang	Tenga	Robinson	8th Voted Out; Day 24	Lost Final Duel; Day 49
Henriette Kühnel Nielsen; 23, Højbjerg	Tenga	Minang	Robinson	12th Voted Out; Day 36	Lost Final Duel; Day 49
Hector Aaskov Nielsen; 23, Roskilde	None		Robinson	Lost Challenge; Day 1 Lost Challenge; Day ?	Lost Final Duel; Day 49
Jakob Helnæs Jensen; 25, Copenhagen	Tenga			2nd Voted Out; Day 6	Lost Final Duel; Day 49
Søren "Nicolai" Korshøj; 51, Copenhagen	Tenga	Tenga	Robinson	Lost Challenge; Day 50	
Zabrina Natasja Kondrup; 23, Kalundborg	Minang	Tenga	Robinson	2nd-Runner-Up; Day 51	
Hans Ole Ravnholt; 43, Kolding	Tenga	Tenga	Robinson	11th Voted Out; Day ? Runner-Up; Day 51	Won Final Duel; Day 49
Søren Engelbret; 31, Vejen	Tenga	Tenga	Robinson	Sole Survivor; Day 51	

== Season summary ==
The major twist this season is that the contestants have been divided into tribes with half of each tribe being "Masters" and the other half being "Slaves". The contestants individual statuses were determined in a challenge they took part in before they were divided into tribes. The twelve members of each gender competed in a challenge against each other with the five winners being the masters of their tribe and each getting to pick one of the seven challenge losers from the other tribe as their slave. Through the slave selection process four contestants, Anja Balle, Gitte Behrendt, Vincent Muir, and Hector Nielsen, were eliminated and sent to "Utopia" to compete against each other as well as future eliminated contestants in order to earn a spot back in the game. Following the elimination, the "Tenga" and "Minang" tribes were formed with the Minang tribe being composed of the female winners and their slaves and the Tenga tribe of the male winners and their slaves.

In episode 2, a tribal swap took place in which most of the contestants swapped tribes.

In episode 3, no elimination took place due to Ali Ghiace's voluntary exit. Also in episode 3, it was revealed that, like last year, there is a mole competing in the game. With this news came that of the mole being the only person eligible to vote for two people at the third tribal council.

In episode 5, both tribes competed in an elimination competition which would lead to players from each tribe being eliminated. Ultimately, it Maiken Andersen and Bjørn Lambertsen from Minang and Ann Applegren from Tenga who lost the challenge and were eliminated and sent to Utopia.

In episode 9, the two tribes merged and five contestants from Utopia (Anja Balle, Diana Andersen, Germaine Nielsen, Hector Nielsen, and Reda Zamzam) returned to the game.

In episode 10, Germaine lost a challenge and was eliminated. In episode 11, Anja and Reda were sent to Utopia where Anja lost a duel and was eliminated. In episode 13, all Utopia contestants competed in a duel which Hans "HC" Nørager lost and was eliminated.

In episode 14, the recently voted out Gitte Benherdt along with all of the remaining Utopia residents competed in the final duel of the season for a spot in the final four. Ultimately, Hans Ravnholt won the duel while the others were eliminated in the following order: Gitte Behrendt, Diana Andersen, Jens Bach, Mette Egeberg, Henriette Nielsen, Hector Nielsen, and finally Jakob Jensen.

In the final, episode of the season the final four faced off in series of three challenges to determine the winner. As the winner of the first challenge Zabrina Kondrup was immune from the second, elimination challenge. Søren "Nicolai" Korshøj became the final contestant to be eliminated when he lost the second challenge.

== Voting history ==
	Original Tribes				Tribal Swap						Merged Tribe	
Episode #:	1				2	3		4	5		6	
Eliminated:	Anja; Gitte; Hector; Vincent; No vote^{1}		Germaine; No vote^{2}	Jakob; 4/5 votes^{3}	Daniell; 5/9 votes^{4}	Ali; No vote	Diana; 7/8 votes^{5},^{6}	Jens; 5/9 votes^{7}	Ann; 1/1 votes^{8}	Bjørn ?/12 votes^{9}	Nini; No vote	Maiken; 8/9 votes^{10}
Eliminated:	Anja; Gitte; Hector; Vincent; No vote^{1}		Germaine; No vote^{2}	Jakob; 4/5 votes^{3}	Daniell; 5/9 votes^{4}	Ali; No vote	Charlotte; 1/8 votes^{5},^{6}	Jens; 5/9 votes^{7}	Ann; 1/1 votes^{8}	Bjørn ?/12 votes^{9}	Nini; No vote	Maiken; 8/9 votes^{10}
Voter	Vote											
Maiken	Lost	Slave #7			Daniell		Diana	~~HK~~		?		Hans Ole
Nini	2nd	Zamzam						Jens		Bjørn		
Bjørn	Lost	Slave #6			Charlotte		Diana	~~HK~~		?	Utopia	
Ann	5th	Daniell						Jens				
HK	Not in Game						Diana	~~Henriette~~	Ann			
Jens	Lost	Slave #7			Daniell		Diana	~~HK~~	Utopia			
Charlotte	Lost	Slave #2			Maiken		Diana	Utopia				
Diana	Lost	Slave #4			Daniell		Charlotte	Utopia				
Ali	Lost	Slave #2			Daniell							
Daniell	Lost	Slave #3			Maiken							
Jakob	4th	Maiken		Søren	Utopia							
Germaine	Lost	Slave #1	Lost	Utopia								
Anja	Lost	Slave #3	Utopia									
Gitte	Lost	Slave #6	Utopia									
Hector	Lost	Slave #5	Utopia									
Vincent	Lost	Slave #4	Utopia									

^1 On day one the contestants took part in challenge to determine the tribal groups. The five men and five women who won the challenge would become the masters of their tribes. The masters would then pick five slaves to complete their tribes. The two men and two women not selected as slaves were eliminated.

^2 At the first immunity challenge both tribes had to bet two of their slaves. At the conclusion of the challenge it was revealed that the masters of the losing tribe would have to choose which of the two bet slaves would be eliminated.

^3 At the first tribal council only the masters of the Rulers tribe were allowed to vote or receive votes. Slaves could neither vote or be voted for.

^4 At the second tribal council Ali could not be voted for as he won individual immunity at the immunity challenge.

^5 At the third tribal council HK could not be voted for as she had immunity having recently joined the game. In reality, HK was immune as she was a mole working for production.

^6 As a twist, there was a double elimination at the third tribal council. The two contestants that received the most votes would be eliminated.

^7 After the initial vote at the fourth tribal council it was revealed that Tenga's votes would not count. Minang then voted to eliminate a member from Tenga.

^8 Following the temporary evacuation of the contestants HK left the game. As her last move as the mole she was given the power to eliminate one contestant. She chose to eliminate Ann.

^9 At the fifth tribal council members from both tribes voted for any contestant they wanted. Henriette, Maiken and Zamzam were immune as they were given immunity talismans from Bjørn.

^10 In episode six Hans Ole, Henriette, Maiken and Mette faced off in a duel. Mette won the duel earning immunity at the next tribal council. As punishment for losing the duel only Hans Ole, Henriette and Maiken could receive votes at tribal council.

== Utopia Final Standings ==
Place	Contestant	Lost Duel
1	Hans Ole Ravnholt	Winner, Returned to the game
2	Jakob Helnæs Jensen	Runner-Up, Winner of Utopia ($50,000)
3	Hector Aaskov Nielsen	11
4	Henriette Kühnel Nielsen	11
5	Mette Ahrenkiel Egeberg	11
6	Jens Flarup Bach	11
7	Diana Seolberg Andersen	11
8	Gitte Benherdt	11
9	Hans "HC" Christian Nørager Poulsen	10
10	Reda Zamzam	9
11	Maiken Holmark Dyrskjøt Andersen	8
12	Anja Mia Balle	7
13	Germaine Nielsen	
14	Bjørn "Pappi" Lambertsen	6
15	Ann Østerby Appelgren	5
16	Charlotte Schou	4
17	Gitte Maagaard Pedersen	3
18	Daniell Edwards	2
19	Vincent Jonathan Muir	1
