= Robinson Ekspeditionen 2001 =

Season of television series

- Season 4
- Presented by: Thomas Mygind
- No. of days: 47
- No. of castaways: 19
- Winner: Malene Hasselblad
- Runner-up: Lars Lang
- Location: Mensirip Island, Malaysia
- No. of episodes: 14

Release
- Original network: TV3
- Original release: 10 September – 3 December 2001

Season chronology
- ← Previous; 2000 Next → 2002

Robinson Ekspeditionen: 2001, was the fourth season of the Danish version of the Swedish show Expedition Robinson and it premiered on 10 September 2001 and aired until 3 December 2001. A new thing in the show was the Talisman could now be traded for an extra vote, instead of being used for immunity.

The first part of the season saw the South team's domination of challenges which led to the first ever tribal swap in the Danish version of the show. When it came time for a merge, three jokers were added to the game. Due to two exits by Ramin Zomorodnia and Lars "Mars" Johansen, Johnny Holm was allowed to return to the game shortly after his initial elimination. Ultimately, it was Marlene Hasselblad from the minority North team who won the season with a jury vote of 10-5 over Lars Lang. The initial vote was 7-2, but with the male and female audience votes being taken into effect (each had three votes to cast) six more votes were split among the finalists.

== Finishing order ==
Contestant	Original Tribes	Episode 4 Tribes	Merged Tribe	Finish
Malene Kaas; 31, Nørrebro	South Team			1st Voted Out; Day 3
Majbritt Yvonne Edelberg; 25, Copenhagen	North Team			2nd Voted Out; Day 6
Ramin Zomorodnia; 29, Hornbæk	North Team			Left Competition; Day 7
Britt Thorhauge; 27, Aarhus	North Team			3rd Voted Out; Day 9
Gitte Melballe; 26, Aarhus	North Team	North Team		4th Voted Out; Day 12
Gry Jantzen; 22, Albertslund	South Team	South Team		5th Voted Out; Day 15
Christina "Tina" Steele; 40, Copenhagen	South Team	South Team	Robinson	6th Voted Out; Day 18
Tom Bach; 30, Aarhus			Robinson	7th Voted Out; Day 21
Tina Nørby; 24, Copenhagen			Robinson	8th Voted Out; 1st Jury Member; Day 24
Poul Madsen; 60, Søborg	North Team	North Team	Robinson	9th Voted Out; 2nd Jury Member; Day 27
Mette Legaard; 39, Aarhus	South Team	South Team	Robinson	10th Voted Out; 3rd Jury Member; Day 30
Johnny Holm; Returned to Game	South Team	South Team	Robinson	11th Voted Out; Day 33
Lars "Mars" Johansen; 38, Silkeborg	North Team	South Team	Robinson	Left Competition; 4th Jury Member; Day 34
Benny Falk; 32, Vallensbæk			Robinson	12th Voted Out; 5th Jury Member; Day 37
Lasse Rungholm; 38, Aarhus	South Team	South Team	Robinson	13th Voted Out; 6th Jury Member; Day 39
Jesper Christoffersen; 27, Frederiksberg	South Team	North Team	Robinson	14th Voted Out; 7th Jury Member; Day 42
Johnny Holm; 31, Fanø	South Team	South Team	Robinson	Returned to game Day 35; 15th Voted Out; 8th Jury Member; Day 45
Carsten Kamstrup; 26, Slagelse	North Team	North Team	Robinson	16th Voted Out; 9th Jury Member; Day 46
Lars Lang; 40, Glumsø	South Team	South Team	Robinson	Runner-Up; Day 47
Malene Hasselblad; 32, Copenhagen	North Team	North Team	Robinson	Sole Survivor; Day 47
