= Robinson Ekspeditionen 2000 =

- Season 3
- Presented by: Thomas Mygind
- No. of days: 47
- No. of castaways: 16
- Winner: Sonny Rønne Pedersen
- Runner-up: Pia Rosholm
- Location: Mensirip Island, Malaysia
- No. of episodes: 14

Release
- Original network: TV3
- Original release: 3 September – 3 December 2000

Season chronology
- ← Previous; 1999 Next → 2001

Robinson Ekspeditionen: 2000, was the third season of the Danish version of the Swedish show Expedition Robinson and it premiered on 3 September 2000 and aired until 3 December 2000.

== Season summary ==
The early part of the season saw the North team's domination of challenges and the formation of an alliance in both teams. The first of these alliances was South team's "C Team" alliance, which was composed of the younger members of the tribe, Birger Jensen, Christina Vilsøe, Frank Markussen, and Signe Ilkjær. This alliance was quickly broken up when in episode 3 Christina was injured and her fellow tribe members were forced to vote her out and when Signe betrayed her fellow alliance members by voting with Brigitte Hoff and Jens Jensen to eliminate Birger. The other, more successful alliance, formed early on in the North team. This alliance, composed of Kim Møller-Nielsen, Lærke Bregenhøj, Pia Rosholm, and Sonny Petersen created a voting block that would prove powerful throughout the season. Two episodes(episode 9 to be specific) after the teams initially merged, there was a vote to decide which of the eliminated contestants would return to the game. Christina won the vote and entered the game, but was soon voted out once again.

The North team alliance having eventually picked off all merge members outside of their alliance composed the final four, with members Pia and Sonny eventually making up the final two. The jury this season was composed of the last eight players eliminated with the public awarding five jury votes as well. Ultimately, it was Sonny Petersen who won the season over Pia Rosholm with a jury vote of 8–5. Sonny was revealed to have received two of the three public jury votes as well as Anton, Brigitte, Christina, Ebbe, Frank, and Signe's votes.

== Finishing order ==
Contestant	Original Tribes	Merged Tribe	Finish
Victorine Njoh Pedersen; 32, Aarhus	South Team		1st Voted Out; Day 3
Søren Sehested; 47, Gilleleje	South Team		2nd Voted Out; Day 6
Christina Vilsøe; Voted back after Merge	South Team		3rd Voted Out; Day 9
Roxanne Tirkov; 35, Albertslund	North Team		4th Voted Out; Day 12
Birger Jensen; 32, Slagelse	South Team		5th Voted Out; Day 15
Ebbe Dag Christensen; 54, Odense	North Team	Robinson	6th Voted Out; 1st Jury Member; Day 18
Bitten Bisgaard; 36, Copenhagen	North Team	Robinson	7th Voted Out; 2nd Jury Member; Day 21
Birgitte Hoff; 56, Holbæk	South Team	Robinson	8th Voted Out; 3rd Jury Member; Day 24
Christina Vilsøe; 22, Roskilde	South Team	Robinson	9th Voted Out; 4th Jury Member; Day 27
Jens Harrekilde Jensen; 41, Gislev	South Team	Robinson	10th Voted Out; 5th Jury Member; Day 30
Frank Markussen; 25, Taastrup	South Team	Robinson	11th Voted Out; 6th Jury Member; Day 33
Signe Ilkjær; 27, Haderslev	South Team	Robinson	12th Voted Out; 7th Jury Member; Day 36
Anton Østergaard; 37, Kongens Lyngby	North Team	Robinson	13th Voted Out; 8th Jury Member; Day 39
Lærke Annalia Bregenhøj; 25, Søborg	North Team	Robinson	14th Voted Out; 9th Jury Member; Day 42
Kim Møller-Nielsen; 23, Aarhus	North Team	Robinson	15th Voted Out; 10th Jury Member; Day 46
Pia Rosholm; 32, Frederiksberg	North Team	Robinson	Runner-Up; Day 47
Sonny Rønne Pedersen; 32, Copenhagen	North Team	Robinson	Sole Survivor; Day 47

== Voting history ==
	Original Tribes					Merged Tribe											
Episode #:	1	2	3	4	5	6	7	8	9	10	11	12		13		Reunion	
Eliminated:	Victorine; 3/8 votes	Søren; 4/7 votes	Christina; 3/6 votes	Roxanne; 5/8 votes	Birger; 3/5 votes	Ebbe ?/12 votes	Bitten; 9/11 votes	Birgitte; 5/10 votes	Christina; 5/9 votes	Jens; 4/8 votes	Frank; 4/7 votes	Signe; 5/6 votes	Anton; 4/5 votes	Lærke; No vote	Kim; No vote	Pia; 5/13 votes^{1}	Sonny; 8/13 votes^{1}
Voter	Vote																
Sonny				Roxanne		Ebbe	Bitten	Birgitte	Christina	Jens	Frank	Signe	Anton	Won		Jury Vote	
Pia				Roxanne		Ebbe	Bitten	Birgitte	Christina	Jens	Frank	Signe	Anton		Won	Jury Vote	
Kim				Roxanne		Ebbe	Bitten	?	Christina	Jens	Frank	Signe	Anton		Lost	Pia	
Lærke				Roxanne		Ebbe	Bitten	Birgitte	Christina	Jens	Frank	Signe	Anton	Lost		Pia	
Anton				Roxanne		Ebbe	Bitten	?	Christina	?	?	Signe	?				Sonny
Signe	Victorine	Søren	?		Birger	?	Bitten	?	?	?	?	?					Sonny
Frank	Victorine	Søren	?		?	?	Bitten	Birgitte	?	?	?						Sonny
Jens	?	Frank	Christina		Birger	?	?	?	?	?						Pia	
Christina	Victorine	Søren	?	Returns		?	Bitten	Birgitte	?								Sonny
Birgitte	?	Frank	Christina		Birger	Ebbe	Bitten	?									Sonny
Bitten				?		?	?									Pia	
Ebbe				?		?											Sonny
Birger	?	Søren	Christina		?												
Roxanne				Pia													
Søren	?	Frank															
Victorine	?																
