= Robinson Ekspeditionen 1998 =

- Season 1
- Presented by: Thomas Mygind
- No. of days: 47
- No. of castaways: 16
- Winner: Regina Pedersen
- Runner-up: Karina Winther
- Location: Langkawi, Malaysia

Release
- Original network: TV3
- Original release: September 11 – December 3, 1998

Season chronology
- Next → 1999

Robinson Ekspeditionen: 1998, was the first series of the Danish version of the Swedish show Expedition Robinson, first shown on 11 September 1998 and broadcast until 3 December 1998. The series is remembered for the all-girl alliance that took place following the second merge vote. Ultimately, it was Regina Pedersen who won over Karine Winther with an unknown jury vote. Contestants Gitte Schnell, Kathleen Kai-Sørensen and Jens Romundstad went on to become prominent television personalities in Denmark.

== Finishing order ==
| Contestant | Original Tribes | Merged Tribe | Finish |
|---|---|---|---|
| Henrik Hjerl; 49, Hellerup | South Team | | 1st Voted Out; Day 3 |
| Nada Bang; 28, Copenhagen | North Team | | 2nd Voted Out; Day 6 |
| Jayne Daimo; 41, Køge | North Team | | 3rd Voted Out; Day 9 |
| Pia Hornhof; 36, Hellerup | South Team | | 4th Voted Out; Day 12 |
| Stig Lauritsen; 38, Copenhagen | North Team | | 5th Voted Out; Day 15 |
| Morten Kirckhoff; 27, Copenhagen | South Team | Robinson | 6th Voted Out; 1st Jury Member; Day 18 |
| Hanne Nørholm; 53, Fredericia | South Team | Robinson | 7th Voted Out; 2nd Jury Member; Day 21 |
| Henrik Ørum; 41, Virum | North Team | Robinson | 8th Voted Out; 3rd Jury Member; Day 24 |
| Kristian Sjøgren; 20, Copenhagen | South Team | Robinson | 9th Voted Out; 4th Jury Member; Day 27 |
| Hassan Torabi; 36, Nykøbing Falster | South Team | Robinson | 10th Voted Out; 5th Jury Member; Day 30 |
| Jens "Biker" Romundstad; 26, Kastrup | North Team | Robinson | 11th Voted Out; 6th Jury Member; Day 33 |
| Ole "Gamle" Thomsen; 60, Fanø | North Team | Robinson | 12th Voted Out; 7th Jury Member; Day 36 |
| Kathleen Kai-Sørensen; 22, Copenhagen | North Team | Robinson | 13th Voted Out; 8th Jury Member; Day 39 |
| Gitte Schnell; 28, Copenhagen | South Team | Robinson | 14th Voted Out; 9th Jury Member; Day 43 |
| Karina Winther; 29, Vejle | South Team | Robinson | Runner-Up; Day 47 |
| Regina Pedersen; 31, Aarhus | North Team | Robinson | Sole Survivor; Day 47 |
