= Linni Meister =

Norwegian model and singer

- Also known as: Linni
- Born: Linn Irene Meister; 4 December 1985 (age 40)
- Origin: Bærum, Norway
- Genres: Pop
- Occupations: Singer, glamour model
- Years active: 2007–present
- Labels: C+C Records, Second Hand Records
- Website: linni.blogg.no/

Linni Irene Meister (born 4 December 1985) is a Norwegian glamour model, pop singer and sex columnist for FHM magazine who lives in Oslo. Meister has a German-Norwegian father and a mother from Sri Lanka. Meister grew up in Slependen in Bærum. Meister first claimed fame in the now defunct Team Aylar, which was a group of glamour models including Elita Löfblad and Aylar Lie. Meister became a household name when she was a Joker contestant on the Norwegian reality television program Robinsonekspedisjonen 2007, where she placed fourth and was much mentioned in the media. Meister is most known abroad for her music single "My Ass", which was released as promotion for the horror-comedy film Dead Snow. In the music video Meister appears nude in some parts, which created a stir in media.

== Television career ==
Between 2008 and 2009 Meister had her own segment on the TV2 youth program Waschera, in which she tried out a number of jobs with varying levels of success. In one episode Meister is taught how to be a stripper, which was highly publicised in Norway. Since 2010 she has had her own television show on TV2 Bliss, called Linni, which follows her life as a glamour model.

== Music career ==
Meister began singing at an early age and began choir practice at age seven. Her professional music career began in summer 2007 after her participation in Robinsonekspedisjonen 2007, when she recorded a cover version of the Destiny's Child song "Survivor", which was released by C+C Records. It was panned by critics, amongst them the main Norwegian newspaper VG. The next year she recorded "Where My Limo At", an ironic song about the life in the spotlight, and in May 2009 she released the music single "My Ass", which entered the iTunes Stores list of the 100 best selling singles in Norway. "My Ass" was released in connection with the Norwegian horror-comedy film Dead Snow and the music video, where Linni appears nude, received extra attention both for Meister and the film itself.

== Other ventures ==
In 2006 Meister was robbed of her private films containing pornographic material with her then-boyfriend, Big Brother contestant Kristian Hilberg. The film contains images from their trip abroad in 2006. The video was uploaded to various pornographic websites within hours of being stolen. Meister tried to make a deal with pornography producer Thomas Rocco Hansen so she could earn money for the film, but the deal never materialized and the situation led to Meister being sacked from Team Aylar. During Christmas 2008 Meister attracted attention when she appeared in FHM magazine, as readers could scrape the bikini off an image of her in the manner of a scratchcard. Meister has also regularly worked since 2007 in FHM, as a sex-columnist in her "Ask Linni" section.

In 2014, she became poker ambassador for NordicBet ahead of the Norwegian Poker Championship.

== Personal life ==
Meister and Bernhard Berntzen married in a wedding chapel in Las Vegas, Nevada, on 21 July 2010. She gave birth to a son, Dennis Michael Bernhard, on 9 September 2009.

== Discography ==
- ”Survivor” (single, C+C Records 2007)
- ”Where my limo at” (single, C+C Records 2008)
- ”My Ass” (single, Second Hand Records 2009)
- ”Cheezy” (single, 2010)
- ”Trophy” (Theme for the show Linni, 2011)
- ”#nofilter” (single, 2015)
