= Robinsonekspedisjonen 2007 =

- Season 2007
- Presented by: Christer Falck
- No. of days: 47
- No. of castaways: 19
- Winner: Ann-Kristin Otnes
- Runner-up: Anne-Grete Strand
- Location: Malaysia
- No. of episodes: 14

Release
- Original network: TV3
- Original release: 9 September – 2 December 2007

Season chronology
- ← Previous; 2005 (VIP) Next → 2008

Robinsonekspedisjonen: 2007 is the seventh season of the Norwegian version of the Swedish show Expedition Robinson. It premiered on 9 September 2007 and aired until 2 December 2007.

== Season summary ==
As this was the first season of Robinson to air since its initial cancellation in 2007, the producers decided to take the show back to its roots. However, there were a few twists throughout the season, the first being that the eighteen initial contestants were forced to compete in an endurance competition before they were split into teams. The two contestants to quit the competition first were eliminated. The next twist came in episode two in which a joker, Linni Meister, entered the game. In episode four, Merete Svenningdal was voted as the least deserving person to win the game by her fellow South team members. Following the vote, Merete was moved to the North team. Following Gunnar Norbeck's evacuation in episode eleven, Peter Arambasic, who had been eliminated in a challenge just prior to the merge, returned to the game in his place. Norbeck was eventually eliminated in a duel against Anne-Grete. In episode thirteen, Kenneth and Vibeke had to compete in a duel in order to determine who would return to the game. Ultimately, it was Ann-Kristin Otnes who won the season with a jury vote of 5-3 over Anne-Grete Strand.

== Finishing order ==
Contestant	Original Tribes	Episode 4 Tribes	Merged Tribe	Finish
Christine Buch; 23, Sarpsborg	None			First to quit Challenge; Day 1
Michael Torød; 26, Tromsø	None			Second to quit Challenge; Day 1
Aimee-Stine Hemstad; 27, Oslo	North Team			1st Voted Out; Day ?
Hilde-Gunn Sorteberg; 43, Ås	North Team			2nd Voted Out; Day ?
Bjørn Vordahl; 45, Tønsberg	North Team	North Team		3rd Voted Out; Day ?
Erling Christiansen; 24, Oslo	South Team	South Team		4th Voted Out; Day ?
Merete Svenningdal; 32, Narvik	South Team	North Team		5th Voted Out; Day ?
John Wiig; 24, Hunndalen	North Team	North Team		6th Voted Out; Day ?
Linni Meister; 21, Oslo	North Team	North Team		7th Voted Out; Day ?
Peter Arambasic; Returned to the Game	South Team	South Team		Lost Challenge; Day ?
Fredrik Jensen; 23, Hundvåg	North Team	North Team	Robinson	8th Voted Out; 1st Jury Member; Day ?
Gunnar Norbeck; 31, Oslo	North Team	North Team	Robinson	Left Competition; 2nd Jury Member; Day ?
Isak Ladegård; 23, Oslo	South Team	South Team	Robinson	9th Voted Out; 3rd Jury Member; Day ?
Peter Arambasic; 47, Kristiansand	South Team	South Team	Robinson	Lost Duel; 4th Jury Member; Day ?
Kenneth Meland; 26, Stavanger	South Team	South Team	Robinson	Lost Duel; 5th Jury Member; Day ?
Bente Furu; 36, Drøbak	North Team	North Team	Robinson	10th Voted Out; 6th Jury Member; Day ?
Vibeke Austad; 29, Stokke	South Team	South Team	Robinson	Lost Challenge; 7th Jury Member; Day ?
Alice Balto; 27, Alta	South Team	South Team	Robinson	Lost Challenge; 8th Jury Member; Day ?
Anne-Grete Strand; 27, Oslo	South Team	South Team	Robinson	Runner-Up; Day 47
Ann-Kristin Otnes; 27, Lillestrøm	South Team	South Team	Robinson	Sole Survivor; Day 47
