= Robinson Ekspeditionen 2003 =

- Season 6
- Presented by: Thomas Mygind
- No. of days: 46
- No. of castaways: 22
- Winner: Frank Quistgård
- Runners-up: Marinela Malisic; Rie Pedersen
- Location: Mensirip Island, Malaysia
- No. of episodes: 13

Release
- Original network: TV3
- Original release: 1 September – 1 December 2003

Season chronology
- ← Previous; 2002 Next → 2004

Robinson Ekspeditionen 2003 was the sixth season of the Danish versions of the Swedish show Expedition Robinson. This season premiered on September 1, 2003 and aired until December 1, 2003. This season was the last to be hosted by the original host of the show, Thomas Mygind.

== Season summary ==
The first twist this season was that two players were to be eliminated on the first day. The first contestant to be eliminated was Lajla Wöhliche Wammen, who was the last person to reach the cage. The second elimination occurred when Anette Kure became the first person to leave the cage. Along with this, this season each team had a chief. The person who was chief was immune at all tribal councils, however, if someone challenged the chief to a duel and the chief lost they would be eliminated and their challenger would become the new chief. A tribal swap in episode 4, saw the creation of new teams as well as the entrance of jokers Ditte Happel and Marinela Malisic into the game. The major twist season was that of "Utopia". When a contestant was eliminated instead of being eliminated, they were sent to Utopia to compete in a duel that would take place when the final three had been decided. When the final three had been decided, twelve eliminated players faced off in a duel in which half were eliminated. The remaining six were then cut down to three when the final three were asked to each select one that they'd like to see return to the game. Those three then competed against the finalists in plank to determine if any of them would return to the game. Ultimately, Hans Helgren won and returned to the game. Another twist was that of the four jokers, David Camacho, Ditte Happel, Mogens Eckert, and Marinela Malisic, who all entered the game at different times during the season. Ultimately, it was Frank Quistgaard who won the season over Rie Pedersen and Marinela Malisic with a jury vote of 7–0–0.

== Finishing order ==
Contestant	Original Tribes	Episode 2 Tribes	Tribal Swap	Merged Tribe	Finish
Lajla Wöhliche Wammen; 36, Skive	None				Lost Challenge; Day 1
Anette Kure; 37, Toftlund	None				First to leave Cage; Day 1
Mogens Eckert; 42, Rungsted	South Team				Lost Duel; Day 4
Jane Nejst; 38, Bagsværd	South Team				1st Voted Out; Day 4
David B.R. Camacho; 35, Aarhus		South Team			Evacuated; Day 5
Stig Witzner; 33, Hellerup	South Team	South Team			Evacuated; Day 7
Hans Helgren; Returned to the Game	South Team	South Team			Lost Duel; Day 7
Kim Jakobsen; 35, Copenhagen	South Team	South Team			2nd Voted Out; Day 7
Michella Bennet; 23, Kongens Lyngby	South Team	South Team			3rd Voted Out; Day 11
Charlotte Hansen; 29, Slagelse	North Team	North Team	North Team		4th Voted Out; Day 15
Lisbet Rosenstand; 30, Copenhagen	South Team	South Team	South Team		5th Voted Out; Day 19
Thomas Højberg; 28, Silkeborg	North Team	North Team	North Team		6th Voted Out; Day 23
Claus Ipsen Jensen; 42, Haslev	South Team	South Team	South Team		Lost Challenge; Day 24
Niels Buch; 34, Copenhagen	North Team	North Team	South Team	Robinson	7th Voted Out; 1st Jury Member; Day 26
Ditte Maria Hapel; 20, Frederikshavn			North Team	Robinson	8th Voted Out; 2nd Jury Member; Day 29
Michael "Olrik" Olrik; 26, Grenaa	North Team	North Team	North Team	Robinson	Left Competition; 3rd Jury Member; Day 33
Anders Pedersen; 25, Brønshøj	South Team	South Team	South Team	Robinson	9th Voted Out; 4th Jury Member; Day 37
Sidsel Zacho Jespersen; 28, Copenhagen	North Team	North Team	South Team	Robinson	10th Voted Out; 5th Jury Member; Day 41
Güner Iljazovski; 24, Ishøj	North Team	North Team	North Team	Robinson	11th Voted Out; 6th Jury Member; Day 43
Hans Helgren; 28, Kongens Lyngby	South Team	South Team		Robinson	Won Duel; Day 44; Lost Challenge; 7th Jury Member; Day 45
Marinela Malisic; 24, Søborg			South Team	Robinson	Runner-Up; Day 46
Rie Pedersen; 29, Copenhagen	North Team	North Team	North Team	Robinson	Runner-Up; Day 46
Frank Quistgård; 29, Valby	North Team	North Team	North Team	Robinson	Sole Survivor; Day 46

== Voting history ==
	No Tribes		Original Tribes							Tribal Swap				Merged Tribe										
Episode #:	1				2				3	4	5	6	7		8	9	10	11	12	13				
Eliminated:	Lajla; No vote	Anette; No vote	Mogens; No vote	Jane; 7/8 votes	David; No vote	Stig; No vote	Hans; No vote	Kim; 4/8 votes	Michella; 2/4 votes	Charlotte; 6/7 votes	Lisbet; 3/6 votes	Thomas; 4/6 votes	Claus; No vote	Niels; 0/9 votes	Ditte; 6/8 votes	Olrik; No vote	Anders; 4/7 votes	Sidsel; 3/5 votes	Güner; No vote	Hans; Won Utopia	Hans; No vote	Marinela; 0/7 votes	Rie; 0/7 votes	Frank; 7/7 votes
Voter	Vote																							
Frank	Won	Won								Charlotte		Thomas		Güner	Ditte		Anders	Sidsel		Finalist		Jury Vote		
Rie	Won	Won								Charlotte		Thomas		Sidsel	Ditte		Marinela	Sidsel		Finalist		Jury Vote		
Marinela	Not in game										Sidsel			Anders	Ditte		Anders	Frank		Finalist		Jury Vote		
Hans	Won	Won	Won	Jane			Lost	In Utopia												1st Place				Frank
Güner	Won	Won								Charlotte		Thomas		Frank	Ditte		Marinela	Sidsel						Frank
Sidsel	Won	Won									Lisbet			Rie	Ditte		Anders; Anders	Frank	In Utopia	3rd Place				Frank
Anders	Won	Won		Jane				Michella	Michella		Sidsel			Marinela	Sidsel		Marinela	In Utopia		7th Place				Frank
Olrik	Won	Won								Charlotte		Ditte		Anders	Ditte									Frank
Ditte	Not in game									Charlotte		Thomas		Güner	Güner									Frank
Niels	Won	Won									Lisbet			Anders	In Utopia					4th Place				Frank
Claus	Won	Won		Jane			Won	Kim	Michella		Lisbet			In Utopia						4th Place				
Thomas	Won	Won								Charlotte		Ditte	In Utopia							4th Place				
Lisbet	Won	Won		Jane				Michella	Anders		Sidsel	In Utopia								9th Place				
Charlotte	Won	Won								?	In Utopia													
Michella	Won	Won		Jane				Anders	Anders	In Utopia										8th Place				
Kim	Won	Won		Jane				Michella	In Utopia											2nd Place				
Stig	Won	Won		Jane																				
David	Not in game																							
Jane	Won	Won		Lisbet	In Utopia															12th Place				
Mogens	Won	Won	Lost	In Utopia																10th Place				
Anette	Won	Lost	In Utopia																	11th Place				
Lajla	Lost	In Utopia																						
Black vote								Kim (x3)																
