= Kirke Såby =

- Town
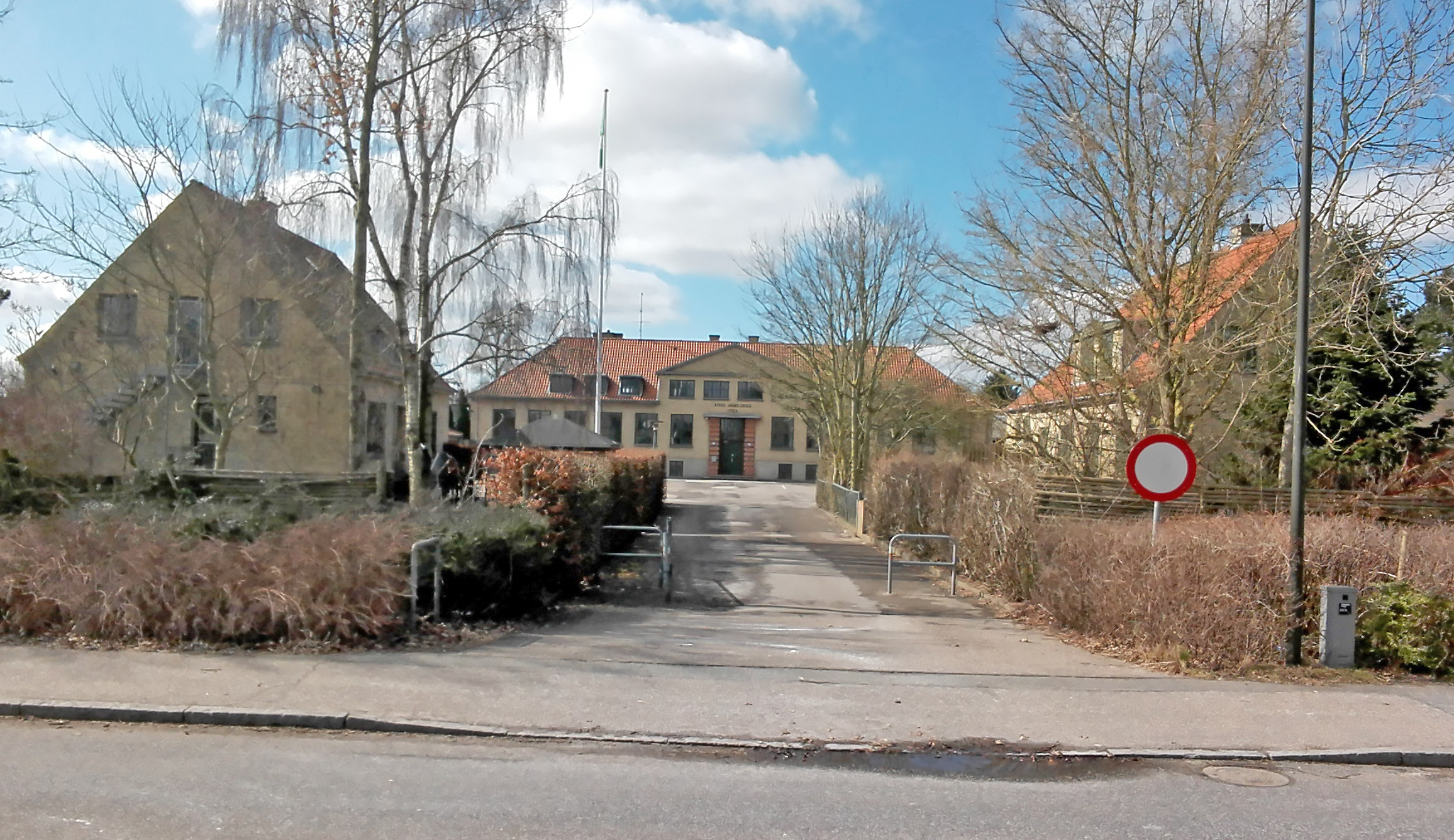
- Kirke Såby School

- Location in Denmark Kirke Såby (Denmark Region Zealand)
- Coordinates: 55°38′13″N 11°52′15″E
- Country: Denmark
- Region: Region Zealand
- Municipality: Lejre Municipality

Area
  - Urban: 1.1 km^{2} (0.42 sq mi)

Population (2026)
  - Urban: 1,651
  - Urban density: 1,500/km^{2} (3,900/sq mi)
- Time zone: UTC+1 (CET)
  - Summer (DST): UTC+2 (CEST)
- Postal code: DK-4060 Kirke Såby

Kirke Såby or Kirke Saaby is a small town, with a population of 1,651 (1 January 2026), in Lejre Municipality, Region Zealand in Denmark. It is located 30 km south of Frederikssund, 19 km west of Roskilde, 17 km southeast of Holbæk and 5 km north of the municipal seat Hvalsø.

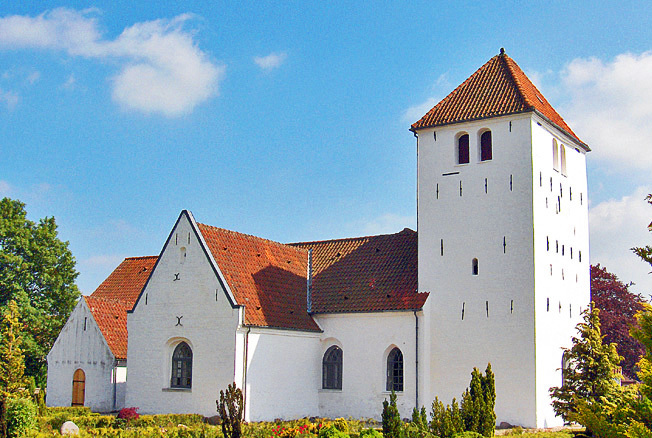
Kirke Såby Church

Kirke Såby Church is located in the town. It is one of Zealand's oldest churches, build around 1100 but much altered in later periods.

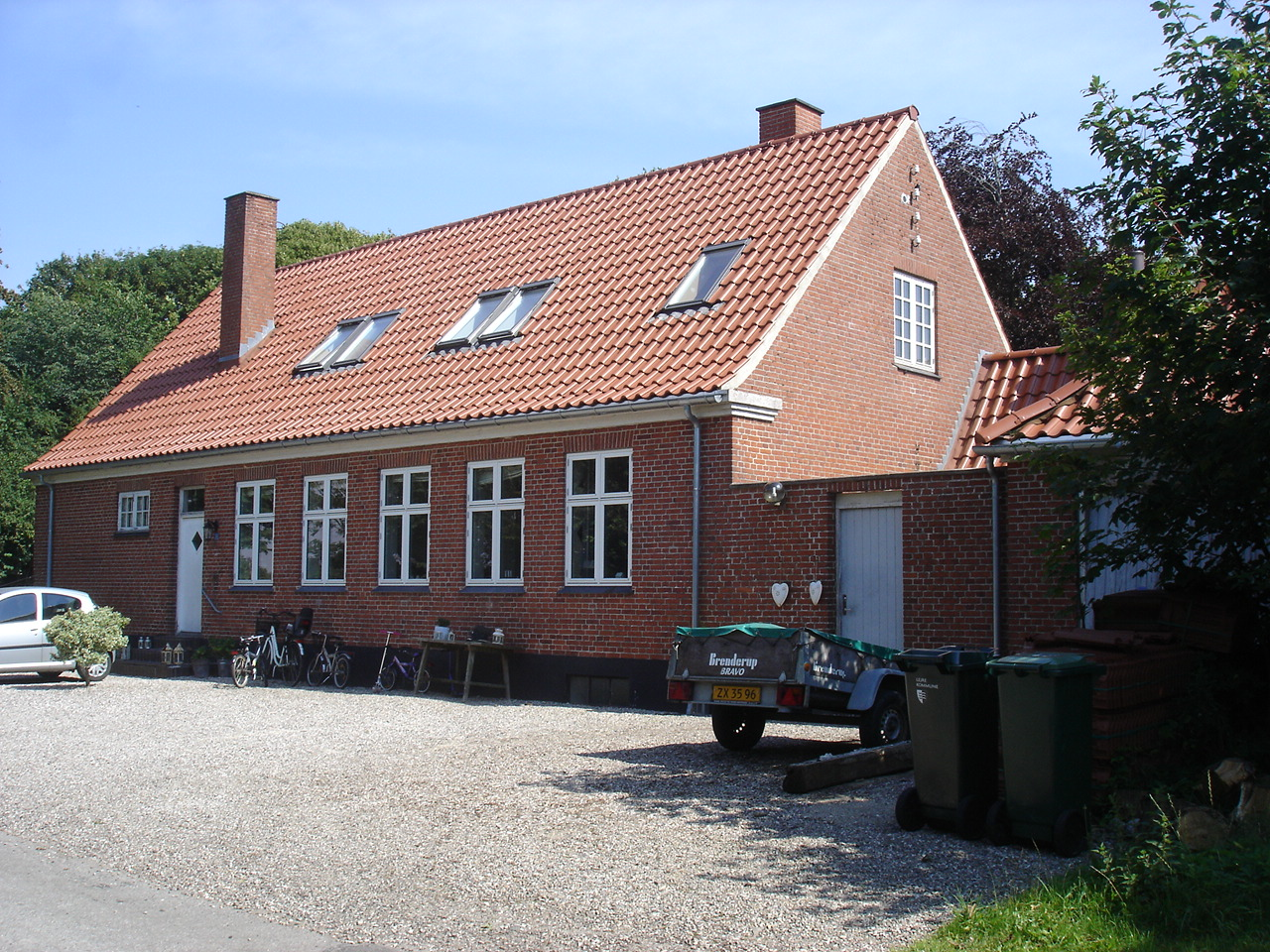
The former Kirke Såby railway station

Kirke Såby was served by Kirke Såby railway station, located on the Central Zealand railway line, from 1928 to 1936. The still existing station building from 1928 was built to designs by the Danish architect Knud Tanggaard Seest.
