= Robinson Ekspeditionen 2005 =

Danish television series

- Season 8
- Presented by: Jakob Kjeldbjerg
- No. of days: 42
- No. of castaways: 26
- Winner: Mogens Brandstrup
- Runners-up: Lykke Maigatter; Solveig Zabell
- Location: Besar Island, Johor, Malaysia

Release
- Original network: TV3
- Original release: 5 September – 28 November 2005

Season chronology
- ← Previous; 2004 Next → 2006

Robinson Ekspeditionen 2005, also known as Robinson Ekspeditionen: Jyderne Mod Københaverne, was the eighth season of the Danish version of the Swedish show Expedition Robinson. This season premiered on September 5, 2005 and aired until November 28, 2005.

This season was the first season to ditch the traditional North verses South team format in favor for one based on the locations of the contestants residences. The two teams for the season were København (Copenhagen) and Jylland (Jutland).

== Season summary ==
The twists this season began in the first episode when immediately after the contestants arrived the teams were forced to compete in their first immunity challenge. Immediately following the immunity challenge, the losing team was asked to vote someone out and Poul Hansen found himself eliminated within an hour of it starting.

The next twist came shortly after Poul's elimination. In a twist that would last til the merge, it was revealed that every few days one person from each team would face off in a duel against a player from the opposing team. The winner of said duel would win a spot in the merge and the power to vote to pardon any eliminated player immediately following their elimination at tribal council, while the loser would be eliminated. This series of five contestant duels and one team duel would ultimately determine who would make the merge. All players who made the merge, with the exception of Ivan who had immunity during the final team duel and Lykke who was pardoned by the winners after initially being voted out, had won a duel.

Another twist came at the first tribal council when it was revealed that the contestants we each be given a certain number of votes that they could use throughout the season, but whenever they used up all of said votes they would not be given any more. In episode three, two jokers, Jesper Lodberg and Morten Aunsborg, were added to the game and unlike in previous seasons, they were allowed to pick which tribe they would compete on in episode four.

Aside from all of these twists, it was revealed that contestant Nis Staak was the son of Duddie Staack and the brother of Mass Staack from the previous season. Eventually, it was Mogens Brandstrup who won the season over Lykke Maigatter and Solveig Zabell in a final challenge.

== Finishing order ==
Contestant	Original Tribes	Episode 4 Tribes	Merged Tribe	Finish
Poul Hansen; 60, Solrød Strand	København			1st Voted Out; Day 1
Maja Volmark; 22, Amager	København			Lost Duel; Day 1
Helle Jønsson; 28, Copenhagen	København			2nd Voted Out; Day 3
Marcus Reinholdt; 40, Gentofte	København			Lost Duel; Day 4
Henrik Melby Andersen; 40, Vejle	Jylland			Lost Duel; Day 5
Pernille Bækgaard; 43, Copenhagen	København			3rd Voted Out; Day 6
Linette Schultz; 21, Kjellerup	Jylland			4th Voted Out; Day 9
Tania Hansen; 31, Greve Strand	København			Lost Duel; Day 10
Tanja Nors Sand; 33, Odder	Jylland			5th Voted Out; Day 12
Morten Aunsborg; 46, Revsøre		København		Left Competition; Day 13
Jesper Lodberg, Pedersker		København		Lost Duel; Day 14
Lykke Maigatter; Returned to game	Jylland	Jylland		6th Voted Out; Day 15
Jim Lyngvild; 26, Albertslund	København	København		Lost Team Duel; Day 17
Rie Soldthved Petersen; 23, Copenhagen	København	København		Lost Team Duel; Day 17
Pia Larsen; 43, Sønderborg	København	København		Lost Team Duel; Day 17
Nis Staack; 29, Malmö, Sweden	København	København		Lost Team Duel; Day 17
Henrik Hjort Fuglsang; 26, Aarhus	Jylland	Jylland	Robinson	7th Voted Out; 1st Jury Member; Day 18
Leif Nielsen; 39, Randers	Jylland	Jylland	Robinson	8th Voted Out; 2nd Jury Member; Day 21
Seckin Cem; 27, Vallensbæk	København	København	Robinson	9th Voted Out; 3rd Jury Member; Day 24
Ivan Larsen; 35, Amager	København	København	Robinson	10th Voted Out; 4th Jury Member; Day 27
Thomas Bro; 24, Silkeborg	Jylland	Jylland	Robinson	11th Voted Out; 5th Jury Member; Day 30
Dion Knudsen; 22, Fredericia	Jylland	Jylland	Robinson	12th Voted Out; 6th Jury Member; Day 33
Marion Hesse; 29, Aabenraa	Jylland	Jylland	Robinson	13th Voted Out; 7th Jury Member; Day 36
Michelle Strøyer Engholm; 44, Gentofte	Jylland	Jylland	Robinson	Lost Challenge; 8th Jury Member; Day 39
Solveig Quito-Zabell; 32, Malmö, Sweden	Jylland	Jylland	Robinson	2nd Runner-Up; Day 42
Lykke Heide Maigatter; 26, Esbjerg	Jylland	Jylland	Robinson	Runner-Up; Day 42
Mogens Brandstrup; 61, Ribe	Jylland	Jylland	Robinson	Sole Survivor; Day 42
