= Diego Tur =

Danish footballer (born 1971)

Personal information
- Full name: Diego Tur
- Date of birth: 3 October 1971 (age 55)
- Place of birth: Copenhagen, Denmark
- Height: 1.86 m (6 ft 1 in)
- Position: Centre back

Youth career
- 1976–1985: BS72 Albertslund
- 1985–1989: B 1903

Senior career*
Years	Team	Apps	(Gls)
1989–1992	B 1903	75	(0)
1992–2002	Copenhagen	192	(12)
2002	→ AB (loan)	10	(0)
2002–2003	AaB	30	(0)
2003–2004	Frem	29	(0)
2005	Roskilde	0	(0)
Total		336	(12)

International career
1990–1991	Denmark U19	4	(0)
1991–1993	Denmark U21	14	(0)
- * Club domestic league appearances and goals

Diego Tur (born 3 October 1971) is a Danish former professional footballer, who played most of his career as a central defender for F.C. Copenhagen, between 1992 and 2002. He played 18 games for various Danish youth national teams, and was awarded Danish under-17 Player of the Year in 1987. Diego Tur has a Danish mother and a Spanish father.

== Biography ==
Born in Copenhagen, Tur started playing football with local club BS 72 Albertslund as a boy, but at age 15 he moved to B 1903. Tur represented various Danish national youth teams, and played a combined total of 18 national youth team games. In 1987, he won the Danish under-17 Player of the Year award. He debuted for B 1903's senior team in 1989, and on 22 October 1991 he was part of B 1903's sensational and legendary 6-2 UEFA Cup win over the major German club FC Bayern Munich at Gentofte Stadion.

On 1 July 1992 B 1903 was merged with Kjøbenhavns Boldklub to form new club F.C. Copenhagen (FCK), and Tur became a part of the FCK squad. In its first year of existence, FCK won the 1993 Danish Superliga championship, and Tur made his debut for the club on 11 April 1993, in the 2–0 victory over Næstved BK. Tur represented F.C. Copenhagen in 11 matches in the championship season. The following years did not bring as much success in the Superliga, but Tur was a part of the FCK teams which won the 1995 and 1997 Danish Cup trophies.

From his FCK debut until his last match for the club on 22 April 2001, against Akademisk Boldklub, Tur made 225 appearances for F.C. Copenhagen divided amongst 192 domestic league appearances, 17 domestic cup appearances and 16 European appearances. He scored 12 goals in the domestic league, one goal in the domestic cup and two goals in the UEFA Cup Winners' Cup. During Tur's time at F.C. Copenhagen, he only received one red card, which was on 19 May 1996, in a Danish Superliga match against Ikast fS.

In a fan vote, which was held during the winter of 2006, Tur was voted into the F.C.Copenhagen Hall of fame as the 18th best player to have represented F.C. Copenhagen in the club's first 14 years.

After winning the 2000-01 Superliga championship with FCK, Tur went on loan to Copenhagen rivals Akademisk Boldklub (AB), due to a dwindling amount of playing time for FCK. After one season at AB, he moved to Jutland for the 2002-03 Superliga season, to represent AaB of Aalborg. He played one season at AaB, before heading back to Copenhagen, to represent newly promoted team BK Frem in the 2003-04 Superliga season. He debuted for Frem on 27 July 2003, against Odense Boldklub. BK Frem finished second-last in the Danish Superliga, and was relegated at the end of the season. Tur retired from professional football, after his last match on 23 May 2004, when he represented BK Frem against Brøndby IF.

In his retirement, Diego Tur represents FC Roskilde in the Danish 2nd Division East as an amateur.

Tur was in Thailand during the Indian Ocean tsunami on 26 December 2004, but survived.

In the fall of 2006 Tur won the Danish edition of Expedition Robinson, which was broadcast on TV3 Denmark. With the honour was also a money prize of DKK 1 million.

From 16 July 2007 he will start as sales assistant in F.C. Copenhagen.

November 2010 - Diego Tur is a father of two children, a new baby boy and little girl, residing in Copenhagen, where he continues to play football with former FCK players.

== Honours ==
- 1987 Danish under-17 Player of the Year
- Danish Superliga: 1992-93, 2000-01
- Danish Cup: 1994-95, 1996–97
- Danish Super Cup: 1995, 2001
