= Robinson Ekspeditionen 2004 =

Season of Danish television series

- Season 7
- Presented by: Jakob Kjeldbjerg
- No. of days: 47
- No. of castaways: 23
- Winner: Mette Frandsen
- Runners-up: Tine Petterssen; Duddie Staack
- Location: Mersing District, Malaysia

Release
- Original network: TV3
- Original release: 30 August – 6 December 2004

Season chronology
- ← Previous; 2003 Next → 2005

Robinson Ekspeditionen 2004, was the seventh season of the Danish version of the Swedish show Expedition Robinson. This season premiered on August 30, 2004, and aired until December 6, 2004. This season was the first to be hosted by the show's current host, Jakob Kjeldbjerg.

== Season summary ==
This season began with a series of twist, the first being that two contestants would be eliminated through a challenge on day one. Pia "Bonnet" Trussel lost the challenge and chose Karabi Bergman to be eliminated with her. Following the initial elimination it was revealed to the teams that within both of the teams were two people who were related to each other; on the North team these two were Duddie and Mass Staack, a mother and son and on the South team these two were Jens and Stine Wedel, a married couple. Along with this, this season saw the show's first ever pregnant contestant, Natasja Hansen.

Shortly before the merge, a tribal swap occurred that saw Brian Rosenkilde and Tine Petterssen switching tribes. When it came time for the final four competition all of the eliminated contestants competed to earn a spot in the final four. The winner of the fourth and final spot was Bjarke Møller, who initially was eliminated in a duel against Morten Fredericia. Ultimately, it was Mette Frandsen who won the season over Tine Petterssen and Duddie Staack by a jury vote of 3-3-2 after having answered a question correctly to break the tie.

== Finishing order ==
Contestant	Original Tribes	Episode 2 Tribes	Episode 4 Tribes	Merged Tribe	Finish
Pia "Bonett" Trusell; 44, Copenhagen	None				Lost Challenge; Day 1
Karabi Bergmann; 28, Copenhagen	None				Eliminated by Pia; Day 1
Michael Lau; 35, Tinglev	South Team				1st Voted Out; Day 3
Bjarke Reffstrup Møller; Returned to game	South Team	South Team			Lost Duel; Day 5
Benny Andersen; 52, Ålbæk	North Team	North Team			2nd Voted Out; Day 6
Karin Skovgaard Jensen; 35, Skagen	South Team	South Team			3rd Voted Out; Day 9
Morten Fredericia; 44, Copenhagen	North Team	North Team	North Team		4th Voted Out; Day 12
Natasja R. Hansen; 29, Copenhagen	South Team	South Team	South Team		Left Competition; Day 13
Mass Albert Staack; 22, Copenhagen	North Team	North Team	North Team		5th Voted Out; Day 15
Tammy Haddaoui; 36, Rødovre	North Team	North Team	North Team	Robinson	6th Voted Out; Day 18
Line Andersen; 25, Svinninge		North Team	North Team	Robinson	7th Voted Out; Day 21
Richi Wagner; 38, Copenhagen	North Team	North Team	North Team	Robinson	8th Voted Out; 1st Jury Member; Day 24
Tina Laurensen ?, Hornslet	North Team	North Team	North Team	Robinson	9th Voted Out; 2nd Jury Member; Day 27
Sheila Petersen; 30, Vanløse	South Team	South Team	South Team	Robinson	10th Voted Out; 3rd Jury Member; Day 30
Heidi Louise Pedersen; 26, Copenhagen	North Team	North Team	North Team	Robinson	11th Voted Out; 4th Jury Member; Day 33
Brian Rosenkilde; 30, Odense	North Team	North Team	South Team	Robinson	12th Voted Out; 5th Jury Member; Day 36
Jens Wedel; 34, Copenhagen	South Team	South Team	South Team	Robinson	Lost Challenge; 6th Jury Member; Day 39
Stine Wedel; 30, Copenhagen	South Team	South Team	South Team	Robinson	13th Voted Out; 7th Jury Member; Day 42
Bjarke Reffstrup Møller; 22, Copenhagen	South Team	South Team			Won Duel; Day 43; Lost Challenge; 8th Jury Member; Day 45
Duddie Staack; 51, Copenhagen	North Team	North Team	North Team	Robinson	2nd-Runner-Up; Day 47
Tine Petterssen; 21, Slagelse	South Team	South Team	North Team	Robinson	Runner-Up; Day 47
Mette Frandsen; 28, Copenhagen	South Team	South Team	South Team	Robinson	Sole Survivor; Day 47
