= Martin Svensson (footballer) =

Danish footballer (born 1989)

Personal information
- Full name: Martin Svensson
- Date of birth: August 10, 1989 (age 37)
- Place of birth: Denmark
- Height: 1.78 m (5 ft 10 in)
- Position: Winger

Youth career
- LFA
- Hessel Gods

Senior career*
Years	Team	Apps	(Gls)
2008–2013	Silkeborg	122	(15)
2013–2014	Randers	17	(1)
2014–2015	Viborg	19	(1)
2015–2016	Vejle BK	16	(4)
2016	Víkingur Reykjavík	3	(0)
2016	Víkingur Ólafsvík	10	(0)
2016–2019	Nykøbing	25	(0)

International career
2009	Denmark U21	2	(0)
- * Club domestic league appearances and goals

Martin Svensson (born 10 August 1989) is a Danish former footballer who played as a winger for Nykøbing FC.

== Career ==
He started his career in Silkeborg IF. He got his official debut for the team in a match against Ølstykke. In June 2013 he signed a 2-year long contract with Randers FC. In 2016, he had a short spell with Icelandic Úrvalsdeild teams Víkingur Reykjavík and Víkingur Ólafsvík.
