= Robinson Ekspeditionen 1999 =

- Season 2
- Presented by: Thomas Mygind
- No. of days: 47
- No. of castaways: 17
- Winner: Dan Marstrand
- Runner-up: Peer Stakroge
- Location: El Nido, Philippines

Release
- Original network: TV3
- Original release: 11 September – 3 December 1999

Season chronology
- ← Previous; 1998 Next → 2000

Robinson Ekspeditionen: 1999, was the second season of the Danish version of the Swedish show Expedition Robinson and it premiered on 11 September 1999 and aired until 3 December 1999. This season was the first to feature added twist to the game. Dan Martstrand went on to win the season with a 7–2 jury vote over Peer Stakroge becoming the first joker ever to win a season of Expedition Robinson in the world.

== Finishing order ==
Contestant	Original Tribes	Episode 2 Tribes	Merged Tribe	Finish
Bente Knudsen; 47, Them	South Team			1st Voted Out; Day 3
Katrine Marboe; 19, Frederiksberg	North Team	North Team		2nd Voted Out; Day 6
Tasja Fouchard; 26, Kongens Lyngby	South Team	South Team		3rd Voted Out; Day 9
Erla Mørch; 47, Blokhus	North Team	North Team		4th Voted Out; Day 12
Kenneth Lynge; 35, Hvidovre	South Team	South Team		5th Voted Out; Day 15
Camilla Wisøfeldt; 31, Frederiksberg	North Team	North Team		6th Voted Out; Day 18
Erik Winther; 58, Copenhagen	South Team	South Team		7th Voted Out; Day 21
Jørgen Kløcker; 32, Frederiksberg	North Team	North Team	Robinson	8th Voted Out; 1st Jury Member; Day 24
Naeem Sundoo; 32, Kongens Lyngby	South Team	South Team	Robinson	9th Voted Out; 2nd Jury Member; Day 27
Lone Hattesen; 22, Haderslev	South Team	South Team	Robinson	10th Voted Out; 3rd Jury Member; Day 30
Morten Josefsen; 24, Aarhus	North Team	North Team	Robinson	11th Voted Out; 4th Jury Member; Day 33
Henrik Andersen; 28, Nykøbing Falster	South Team	South Team	Robinson	12th Voted Out; 5th Jury Member; Day 36
Janne Arusi; 39, Fredericia	North Team	North Team	Robinson	13th Voted Out; 6th Jury Member; Day 39
Lissi Andersen; 34, Slagelse	South Team	South Team	Robinson	14th Voted Out; 7th Jury Member; Day 42
Martin Vendelboe; 26, Vejle	North Team	North Team	Robinson	15th Voted Out; 8th Jury Member; Day 46
Peer Stakroge; 50, Struer	North Team	North Team	Robinson	Runner-Up; Day 47
Dan Marstrand; 51, Køge		South Team	Robinson	Sole Survivor; Day 47
