= Robinson Ekspeditionen 2013 =

Robinson Ekspeditionen 2013 is the 15th season of the Danish reality-show Robinson Ekspeditionen.

== Contestants in Robinson Ekspeditionen 2013 ==
Contestants	Episode													Placement
Contestants	01	02	03	04	05	06	07	08	09	10	11	12	13	Placement
Jeppe Hansen; 35, Aabyhøj, teacher														Winner
Jan "Due" Due; 38, Taulov, peadoguge														Lost finale
Martin Christensen; 31, Brønshøj, independent														Lost finale
Sara Nielsen; 21, Aalborg sergent														Lost duel 4th
Betina "Tammaro" Tammaro; 47, Solrød Strand, teacher														Lost 'The Plank'; 5th
Helle Lykke; 45, Stensved, fitness instructor														10th Voted out 6th
Patrick Lønsmann; 28, Gudbjerg, unemployed														Lost duel 7th
Michael "Backer" Backer; 25, Valby, manager														9th voted out 8th
Mikkel Saabo; 39, Hørsholm, mentor														8th voted out 9th
Camilla Brydensholt; 24, Østerbro, fitness instructor														7th voted out 10th
Kenneth Willander; 27, Aalborg carpenter														6th voted out 11th
Robert Nielsen; 45, Nørrebro, unemployed														Lost duel 12th
Mikael Ryttergaard; 34, Løgumkloster, porter														Evacuated; 13th
Bettina Aasling; 33, Hedehusene, accountant														5th voted out 14th
Rikke Jæger; 25, Aarhus, salesperson														4th voted out 15th
Laura Groth; 25, Amager, nurse														3rd voted out 16th
Morten Lange; 51, Christianshavn, librarian														Quit; 17th
Cecilie Poulsen; 22, Amager, student														Evacuated; 18th
Lone Heding; 58, Aarhus SOSU-assistant														2nd voted out 19th
Behrad Moini; 30, Copenhagen, independent														1st voted out 20th
Buket Genc; 32, Aarhus, teacher														Team lost challenge 21st

Team South.

Team North.

Merge.

Separated.

Eliminated.
