= Mensirip Island =

Island in Malaysia

Native name: Pulau Mensirip
- Interactive map of Mensirip Island

Geography
- Location: South China Sea
- Coordinates: 2°33′04″N 103°57′35″E
- Archipelago: Babi Islands
- Area: 0.09 km^{2} (0.035 sq mi)

Administration
- Malaysia
- State: Johor
- District: Mersing
- Mukim: Babi Islands

Additional information
- Time zone: MST (UTC+8)

The Mensirip Island (Malay: Pulau Mensirip) is an island in Mersing District, Johor, Malaysia. It is a private island that belongs to a member of the royal house of Johor.

The island features the first underwater royal post box.

== See also ==
- List of islands of Malaysia
