= Jakob Kjeldbjerg =

Danish footballer and television host (born 1969)

Personal information
- Full name: Jakob Kjeldbjerg Jensen
- Date of birth: 21 October 1969 (age 57)
- Place of birth: Frederiks, Denmark
- Position: Defender

Senior career*
Years	Team	Apps	(Gls)
–1986	Viborg FF		
1987	Holstebro Boldklub		
1988–1990	Viborg FF		
1991–1993	Silkeborg IF	73	(11)
1993–1997	Chelsea	52	(2)

International career
1989–1992	Denmark under-21	20	(1)
1992–1994	Denmark	14	(1)
Medal record
Men's football
Representing Denmark
CONMEBOL–UEFA Cup of Champions
Runner-up	1993 Argentina
- * Club domestic league appearances and goals

Jakob Kjeldbjerg Jensen (Danish pronunciation: [ˈjɑ.kʌb ˈkʰelˀp̚ˌbjæɐ̯]; born 21 October 1969) is a Danish television presenter and former professional footballer.

As a player as a central defender who notably played in the Premier League for Chelsea from 1993 to 1997, prior to this he had played in his native country for Viborg FF, Silkeborg IF and Holstebro Boldklub. He won 14 caps and scored one goal for the Danish national team, and represented Denmark at the 1992 Summer Olympics.

After retirement he moved into presenting football coverage, later branching out to host the Danish TV versions of Gladiators and I'm a Celebrity...Get Me Out of Here!.

== Club career ==
Kjeldbjerg started playing football lower-league clubs Holstebro Boldklub and Viborg FF, before moving to Danish top-flight team Silkeborg IF.

In August 1993, he moved abroad in England. He was bought by Chelsea in the FA Premier League, in a transfer deal worth £485,000. Eighty years after Nils Middelboe made his Chelsea debut in 1993, Kjeldbjerg became the second Dane to play for the club. He stayed with Chelsea for four years. In a game against Millwall in February 1995, Kjeldbjerg dislocated his shoulder, the first incident in a long list of injuries. He injured a ligament in his left knee, and was unable to fully recover. He ended his professional football career in 1997, only 28 years old.

== International career ==
He was selected team captain for the Danish under-21 national team which competed at the 1992 Summer Olympics, and won the 1992 Danish under-21 Player of the Year award. He made his national team debut in November 1992, and scored his only national team goal in a 2–2 draw with the United States in January 1993. He played in the 1993 Artemio Franchi Trophy game against Argentina, where he was praised for his effective marking of Argentinian playmaker Maradona.

== Media career ==
In May 1998, he began hosting football matches from the Danish Superliga and UEFA Champions League, for the Danish television channel TV3. In 2004, he became the host in TV3's Danish version of the Survivor-concept reality show: Robinson Ekspeditionen. In August 2007, he became the new host for Onside, a popular football TV magazine.

In 2003, Kjeldbjerg hosted the Danish version of Gladiators, Gladiatorerne.

In 2012 and 2013 Kjeldbjerg hosted the realityshow Divaer i Junglen (a Danish version of I'm a Celebrity...Get Me Out of Here!), where participants from other reality shows participate in the South-American jungle.

== Honours ==
Chelsea

- FA Cup runner-up: 1993–94
