= TV3 (Danish TV channel) =

- Broadcast area: Danish Realm

Ownership
- Owner: Viaplay Group
- Sister channels: TV3+, TV3 Puls, TV3 MAX, TV3 Sport, See

History
- Launched: 30 September 1990

Availability

Terrestrial
- Boxer: Channel 202
- Televarpið: Channel 13 SD

TV3 is a Danish pay television channel owned by Viaplay Group. It was separated from the earlier Pan-Scandinavian version in 1990.

Unlike its main rivals, DR and TV 2, the channel does not broadcast from Denmark but from the United Kingdom. This excludes the channel from the rules in Denmark that apply to advertising, meaning TV3 interrupts programming with commercial breaks.

The channel has aired many American and British series.
