= Turks in Sweden =

Ethnic group in Sweden

Total population
- 100,000 (2009 estimate by the Swedish Ministry for Foreign Affairs); 150,000 (2018 estimate by the Swedish Consul General); Plus a further 30,000 Bulgarian Turks (2002 estimate by Laczko et al); Plus 5,000 Macedonian Turks (90% in Malmö); Plus growing Iraqi Turkmen and Syrian Turkmen communities

Regions with significant populations
- Stockholm (Rinkeby, Tensta, Alby); Gothenburg (Biskopsgården, Hisingen); Malmö (Rosengård); Karlskrona; Landskrona

Languages
- Turkish; Swedish

Religion
- Predominantly Sunni Islam; Minority Alevism, Christianity, other religions, or irreligious

Related ethnic groups
- Turks in Denmark, Turks in Finland, Turks in Norway

Turks in Sweden or Swedish Turks (Swedish: Turkar i Sverige; Turkish: İsveç Türkleri) are people of ethnic Turkish origin living in Sweden. The majority of Swedish Turks descend from the Republic of Turkey; however there has also been significant Turkish migration waves from other post-Ottoman countries including ethnic Turkish communities which have come to Sweden from the Balkans (e.g. from Bulgaria, Greece, Kosovo, North Macedonia and Romania), the island of Cyprus, and more recently Iraq and Syria.

In 2009 the Swedish Minister for Foreign Affairs estimated that there were 100,000 people in Sweden with a Turkish background, and a further 10,000 Swedish-Turks living in Turkey. Many Turks in Sweden have double citizenship and 37,000 are registered voters in Turkey.

== History ==
The first Turks came to Sweden in the early 18th century from the Ottoman Empire, whilst the second wave came in the 1960s from modern post-Ottoman nation states, especially from Turkey but also from the Balkans (mainly Bulgaria and North Macedonia), but also from the island of Cyprus. More recently, since the European migrant crisis Turks from Iraq and Syria have also come to Sweden.

=== Charles XII creditors ===
During the Battle of Poltava in 1709, Charles XII's Swedish field army was defeated by the Russians. To escape arrest by the Russians, Charles XII had to leave the defeated army and go to the Ottoman Empire where he stayed for five years. Upon his return to Sweden in 1715, a smaller number of creditors came to Sweden to collect the debt he owed them. But it took a few years before they got repaid so they stayed a while. They left after getting paid. According to the prevailing church law, everyone who was in Sweden, but was not a member of the Swedish state church, would be baptized. In order for the Muslim and Jewish creditors to avoid this, Charles XII wrote a free letter so that they could perform their Islamic services without being punished. The free letter showed that Karlskrona was the first city in Sweden where Muslims could perform their worship. According to Harry Svensson, this fleet's presence in Karlskrona has contributed to the religious and culturally open climate in the city over the past 300 years.

=== Modern migration wave ===
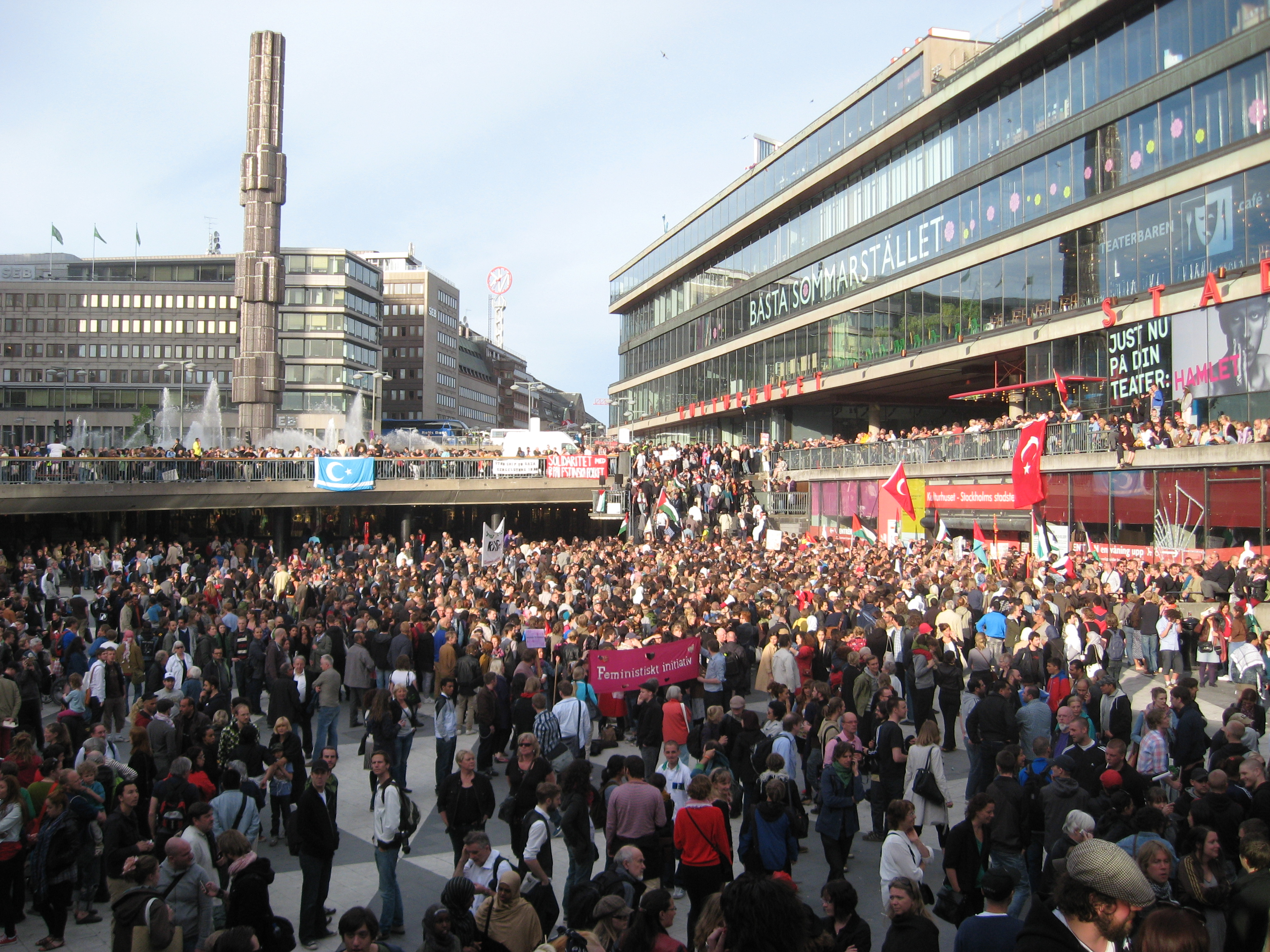
Swedish Turks protesting in Stockholm with Turkish and Turkish Iraqi flags.

The second wave of Turks who came to Sweden was in the 1960s when Sweden opened the door to labor immigration. Most ethnic Turks arrived from the Republic of Turkey as well as Bulgaria and Yugoslavia.

Turks who came from the former Yugoslavia in the 1960s came largely from the Prespa region. From different contexts, many knew each other and they began to organize and strive for common interests. Approximately, 5,000 Macedonian Turks settled in Sweden, with 90% (i.e. 4,500) living in Malmö.

Due to the forced Bulgarian assimilation policies, approximately 30,000 Bulgarian Turks have migrated to Sweden, most of which arrived in the late 1980s.

More recently, since the European migrant crisis (2014-2020), there has been a significant rise in the number of Iraqi Turks and Syrian Turks.

== Turkish organizations ==
=== Mosques controlled by Diyanet ===
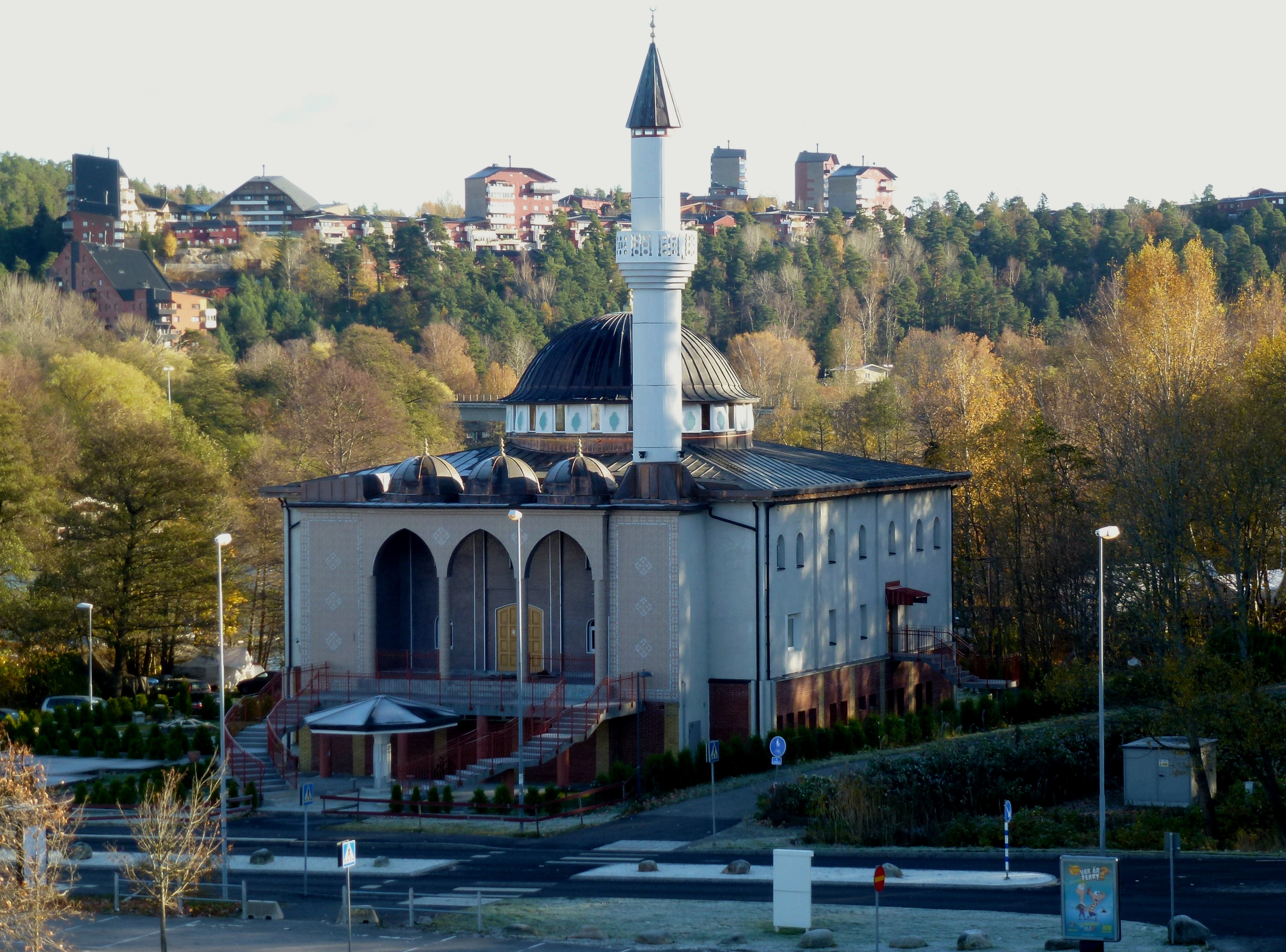
The Fittja Mosque was built in the typical Ottoman architectural style. It serves the Turkish community living in Fittja, Stockholm.

According to Dagens Nyheter in 2017, nine mosques in Sweden have imams sent and paid for by the Turkish Directorate of Religious Affairs (Diyanet). Along with their religious duties, the imams are also tasked with reporting on critics of theTurkish government. According to Dagens Nyheter, propaganda for president Erdogan is openly presented in the mosques.

- Muslimska församlingen i Malmö (translation: Muslim congregation in Malmö) is a Turkish congregation connected to the Turkish directorate of Religious Affairs, Diyanet. According to its own records, it has 2200 members. The imam was trained and sent by Diyanet. According to the Swedish Agency for Support to Faith Communities, the mosque has good relations to the Malmö Millî Görüş chapter. In 2011, after decades of collecting donations from its members, it bought a property to use as a mosque for 8 million SEK. In 2017, the congregation donated its property to Svenska Islam stiftelsen (Turkish: Isveç Diyanet Vakfı) which is part of Diyanet.
- Fittja Mosque

=== Football clubs ===
In 1973 the Macedonian Turks formed the KSF Prespa Birlik football club. Players of Turkish nationality have also played in FBK Balkan fotball club.

=== Political parties ===
Nuance Party is a minority focused and Turkey-friendly party that was founded in 2019 by Turkish-born politician Mikail Yüksel.

== Politics and elections ==
In the 2018 Swedish general election, 10 000 Swedish citizens living in Turkey were expected to cast their votes in Turkey. As in May 2022 Sweden made an accession bid to join NATO, Turkey demanded that Sweden ends its alleged support for the Gülen movement.

== Notable Swedish Turks ==
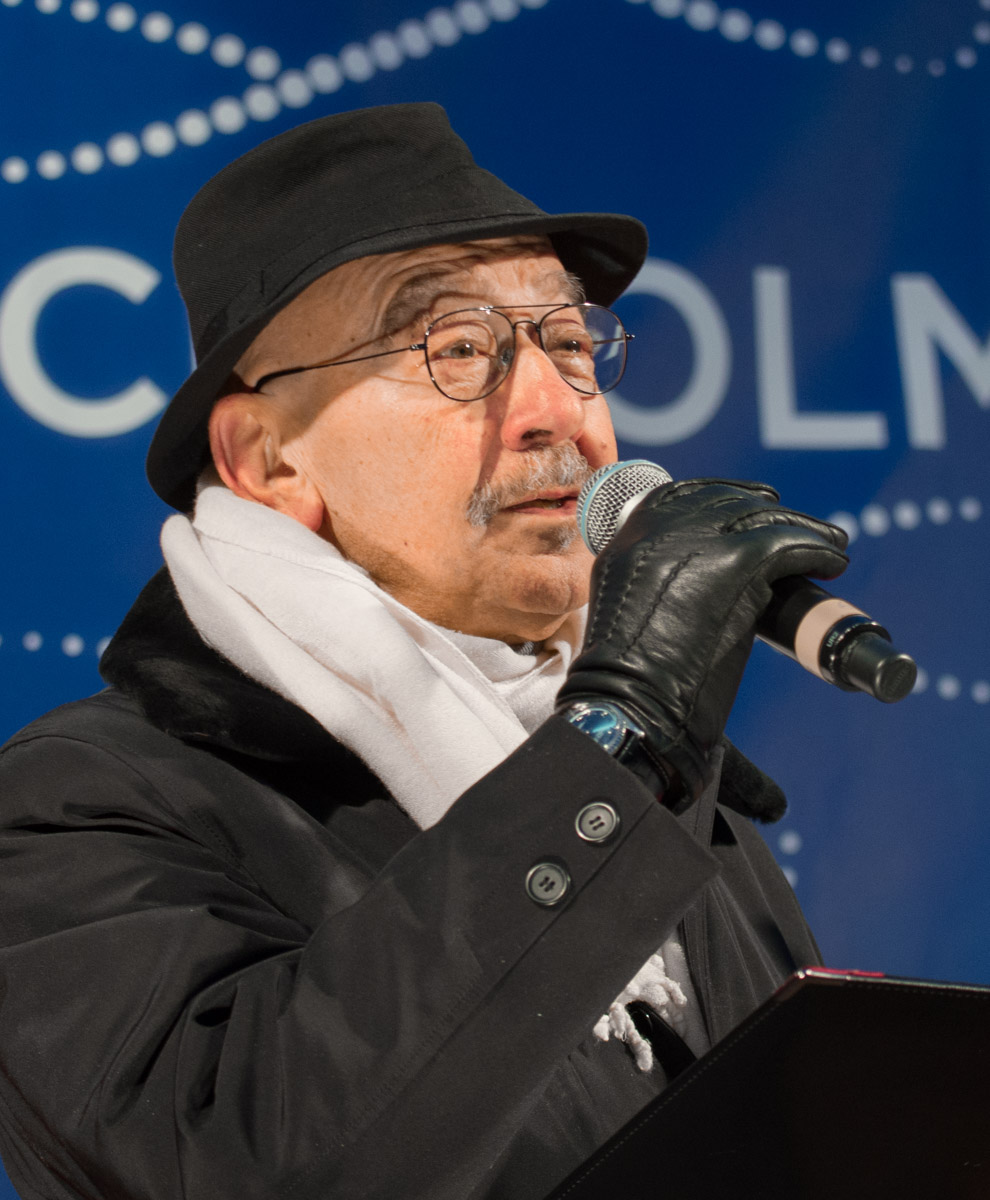
Hayati Kafe

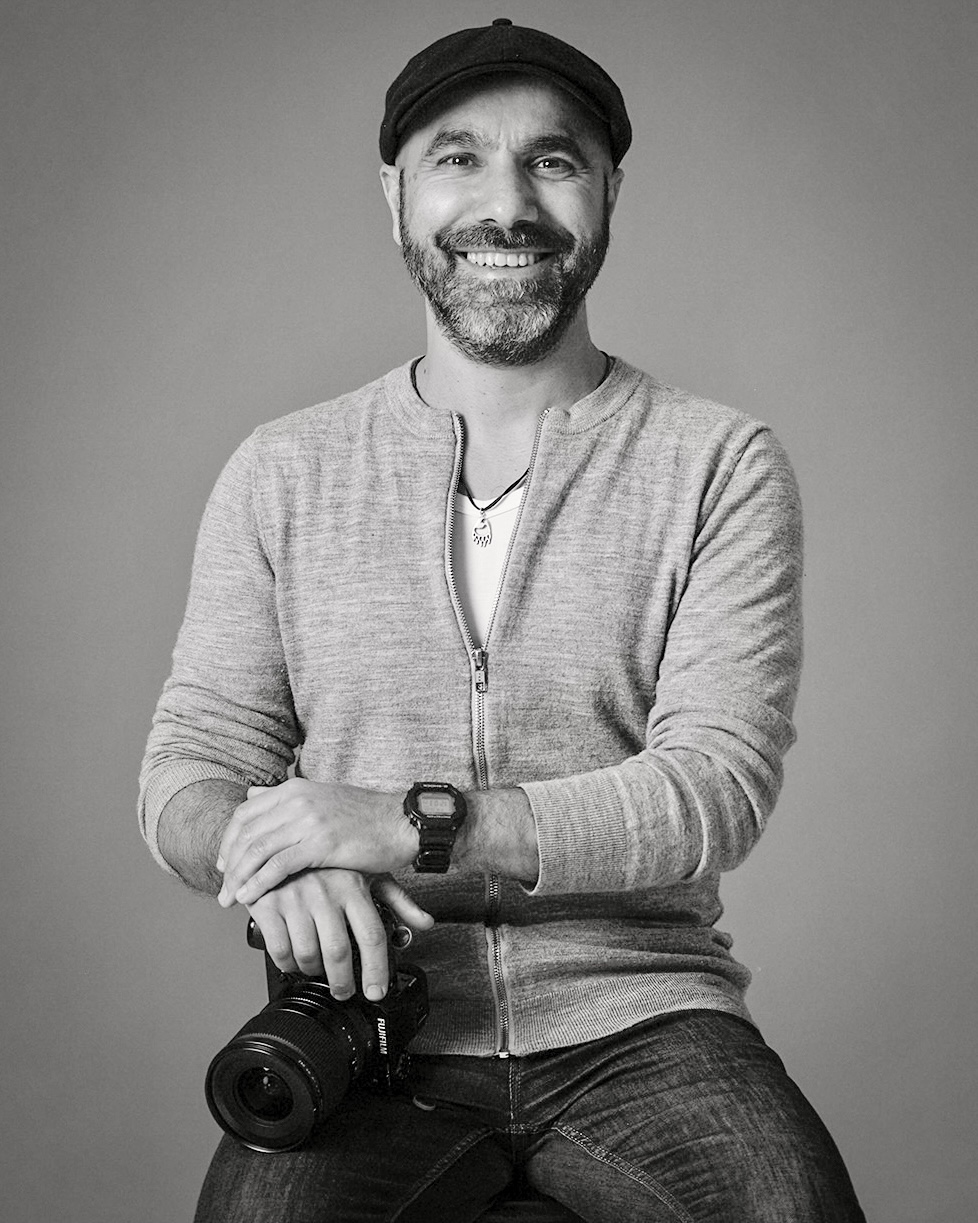
Serkan Günes

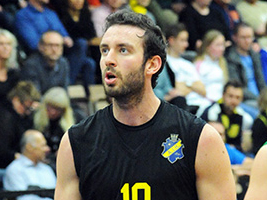
Serkan Inan

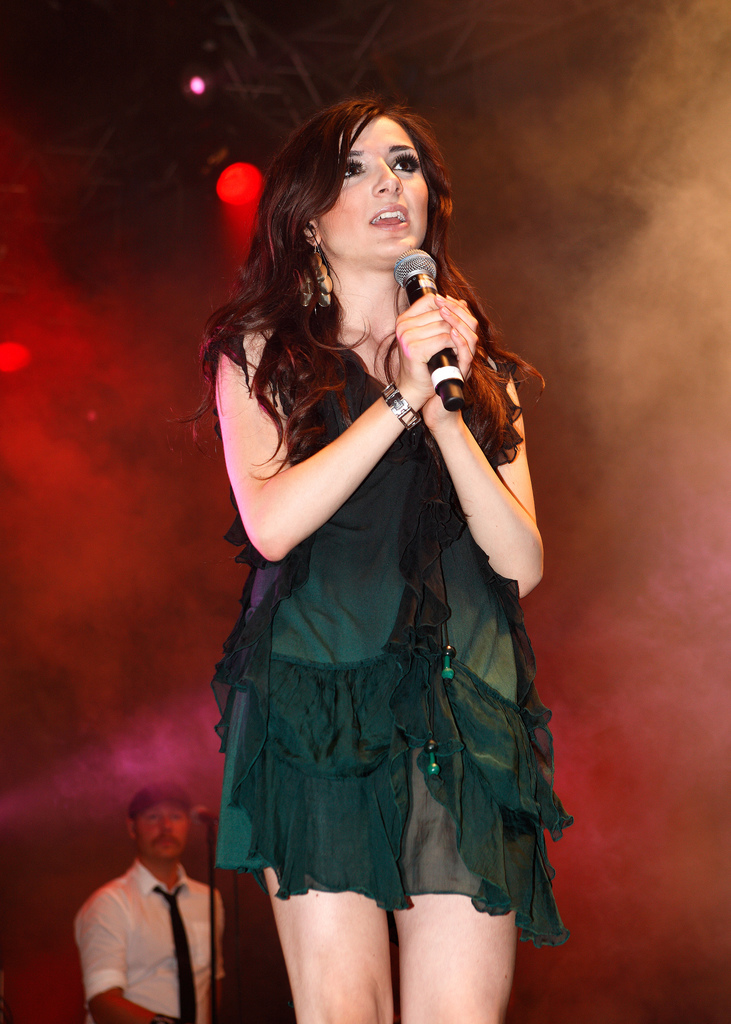
Sibel Redzep

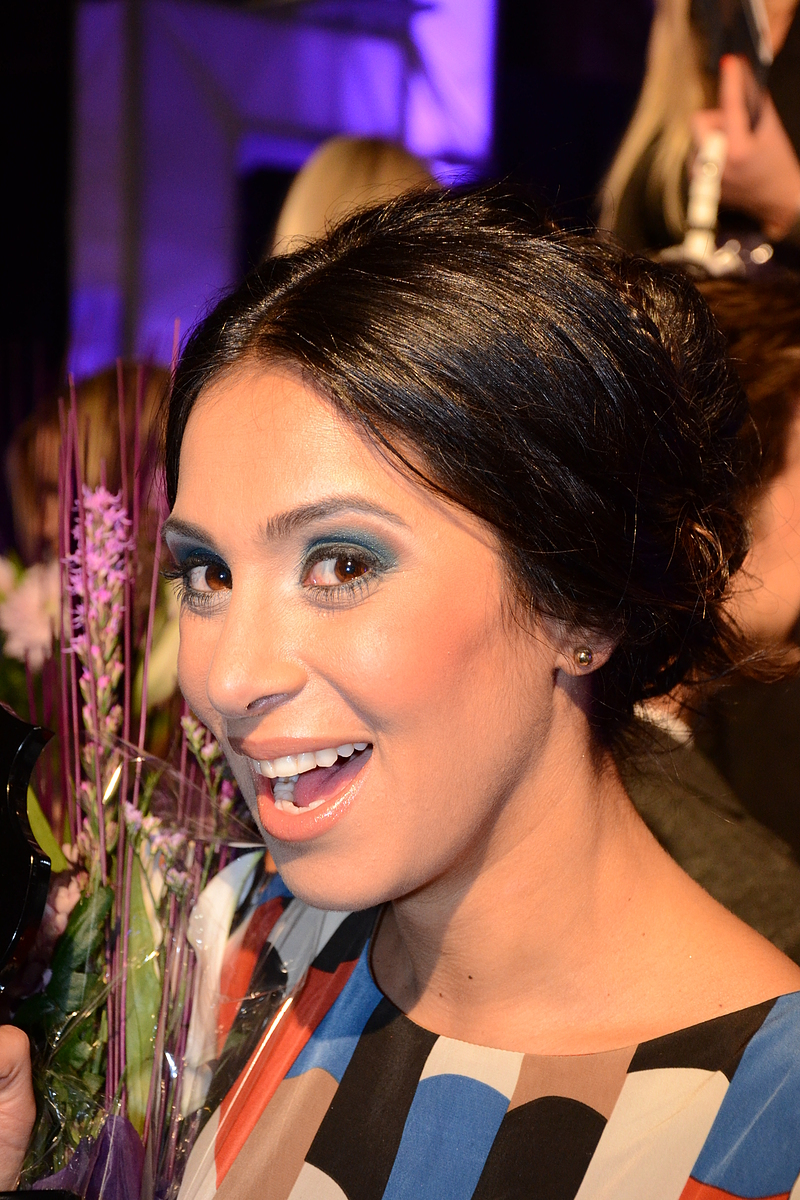
Meral Tasbas

- Hayati Kafe, musician
- Khaled Alesmael, writer and journalist (Turkish mother and Syrian father)
- Kadim Akça, billionaire; founder of Keep Holding
- Thomas Kaan Önol Lang, male alpine ski racer
- Leyla Alaton, is a Turkish businesswoman and art collector (swedish mother)
- Meriç Algün, installation artist
- Sinan Ayrancı, football player
- Kazım Ayvaz, Olympic wrestler
- Brazer Bozlak, entrepreneur, architect
- Erol Bekir, football player and sports coach (Turkish Macedonian origin)
- Radi Birol, architect
- Ekin Bulut, football player
- Ergun Caner, author (Turkish father and Swedish mother)
- Elif Ceylan, voice actress
- Fikret Çesmeli, actor
- Hasan Çetinkaya, sports agent
- Erdin Demir, football player
- Muharrem Demirok, politician and former leader of Centre Party (Sweden)
- Alper Demirol, football player
- Rodin Deprem, football player
- Gizem Erdogan, actress
- İlhan Erşahin, musician
- Muvaffak "Maffy" Falay, trumpeter
- Amine Gülşe, actress, model, Miss Turkey 2014 (Turkish mother and Turkish Iraqi father)
- Deniz Gül, football player
- Serkan Günes, photographer
- Leyla Güngör, football player (Turkish father and Swedish mother)
- Dilek Gür, theater director and translator
- Thomas Gür, journalist
- Dilan Gwyn, actress
- Dennis Gyllensporre, army officer
- Roza Güclü Hedin, member of the S/SAP (Turkish mother and Kurdish father)
- Ülkü Holago, journalist
- Deniz Hümmet, football player
- Erkan Inan, basketball player
- Serkan İnan, basketball player
- Mehmet Kaplan, politician
- Günes Karabuda, photographer
- Magnus Karaveli, journalist
- İlhan Koman, sculptor
- Ferhat Korkmaz, football player
- Vendela Kirsebom, model and actress (Turkish father and Norwegian mother)
- Edvin Kurtulus, football player
- Yusuf Küpeli, one of the founders of the People's Liberation Party-Front of Turkey
- Katarina Magnussadotter, (birthname unknown; died-1414) Turkish slave girl who converted to Christianity; she became a nun in Vadstena Abbey and was a gift from Queen Joanna I of Naples
- Mehmet Mehmet, football player (Turkish Bulgarian origin)
- Ayda Mosharraf, singer (Turkish mother and Iranian father)
- Emin Nouri, football player (Turkish Bulgarian origin)
- Yksel Osmanovski (Yüksel Osmanoğlu), football player (Turkish Macedonian origin)
- Mahmut Özen, football player
- Muammer Özer, film director
- Haluk Özdalga, turkish politician
- Lütfi Özkök, photographer
- Sermin Özürküt, politician
- Erdal Rakip, football player (Turkish Macedonian origin)
- Sibel Redzep (Sibel Recep), popular Swedish singer (Turkish Macedonian origin)
- Erkan Sağlık, football player
- Serdar Semiz, ice hockey player
- Bora Serbülent, singer and founder of İsveç Türk Radyosu (Turkish Cypriot origin)
- Zübeyde Simsek, TV personality
- Meral Tasbas, television personality, singer and actress
- Demir Turgut, Olympic sailor
- İsak Vural, football player
- Pınar Yalçın, football player
- Richard Yarsuvat, football player (Turkish father and Kosovan-Albanian mother)
- Anthony Yigit, boxer at the 2012 Summer Olympics
- Mikail Yüksel, politician and founder of the Partiet Nyans (Nuance Party)
- Erkan Zengin, football player

== See also ==
- Sweden–Turkey relations
- Gustaf Wallenberg (diplomat)
- Ola Hansson
- Gustaf Palm
- Elisabeth Palm
- Coffee in Sweden
- Finnish Tatars
- Turks in Europe
  - Turks in Denmark
  - Turks in Finland
  - Turks in Austria
  - Turks in Germany
  - Turks in France
  - Turks in the Netherlands
  - Turks in Norway
- Kurds in Sweden
- Islam in Sweden

== Bibliography ==
- Laczko, Frank; Stacher, Irene; Klekowski von Koppenfels, Amanda (2002). New challenges for Migration Policy in Central and Eastern Europe. Cambridge University Press. ISBN 978-90-6704-153-9.. (Turkic Swedish: İ'svoç Túrkhlärih)
