= Turks in Denmark =

Ethnic group in Denmark

Total population
- 67,823 (2025)

Regions with significant populations
- Aarhus, Copenhagen, Høje-Taastrup, Ishøj

Languages
- Turkish; Danish

Religion
- Predominantly Sunni Islam; Minority Alevism, Christianity, other religions, or irreligious

Related ethnic groups
- Turks in Finland, Turks in Germany, Turks in Norway, Turks in Sweden

Turks in Denmark, also referred to as Turkish Danes or Danish Turks (Danish: Tyrkere i Danmark; Turkish: Danimarka Türkleri) refers to ethnic Turkish people living in Denmark. They currently form the largest ethnic minority group in the country; thus, the Turks are the second-largest ethnic group in Denmark, after the ethnic Danish people. The majority of Danish Turks descend from the Republic of Turkey; however, there has also been significant Turkish migration from other post-Ottoman countries including ethnic Turkish communities which have come to Denmark from the Balkans (e.g. from Bulgaria, Bosnia and Herzegovina, Kosovo, North Macedonia, Romania), the island of Cyprus, and more recently Iraq and Syria.

== History ==
At the end of the 1950s Denmark required a high labour demand which triggered labour immigration mainly from Turkey and Yugoslavia; consequently, alongside the Turkish migrants from Turkey, there was also a substantial number of Balkan Turks (e.g. Bulgarian Turks, Bosnian Turks etc) who arrived in Denmark. More recently, Iraqi Turks and Syrian Turks have also migrated to Denmark since the European migrant crisis.

== Demographics ==
In 2008, a report published by the Danish Broadcasting Corporation stated that there was 70,000 people of Turkish origin who were Muslims. Thus, the Turks were the largest Danish Muslim population and accounted for 35% of the 200,000 Muslims. In 2015 the Turkish Danish population was around 75,000.

The majority of Turkish Danish people descend from Turkey; however, some have also arrived from other post-Ottoman countries. For example, there were approximately 2,000 Turkish Iraqi immigrants in Denmark in 2010 (excluding descendants).

== Culture ==
=== Language ===
Within the home environment, the mother tongue is most dominant and children are expected to speak Turkish. However, Danish is spoken outside the home, creating a bilingual identity.

=== Religion ===
The majority of Turks regard themselves as Muslims. They worship their religion mainly within their own Turkish community and are subdivided mainly by political or religious differences. The Diyanet supports mosque associations in Denmark and controls the majority of the religious organisations used by the community. The "Danish Turkish Islamic Foundation" (Danish: Dansk Tyrkisk Islamisk Stiftelse) is part of the Diyanet and is the largest Muslim organisation in Denmark. The Diyanet's major competing Islamic networks are the Millî Görüş as well as the Alevi association.

In 2008 a report published by the Danish Broadcasting Corporation estimated that the Danish Turks formed 70,000 out of a total of 200,000 Muslims in the country. Hence, one-third of the country's Muslims were of Turkish origin.

=== Community ===
The Turkish community in Denmark is represented by various non-profit organizations that promote cultural and social activities. One of these is Turkish Expats in Denmark (TEID), a non-profit association established in 2023. TEID brings together Turkish professionals, academics, students, and their families living in Denmark by organizing networking events, knowledge-sharing activities, and initiatives that support integration into Danish society.

== Notable people ==
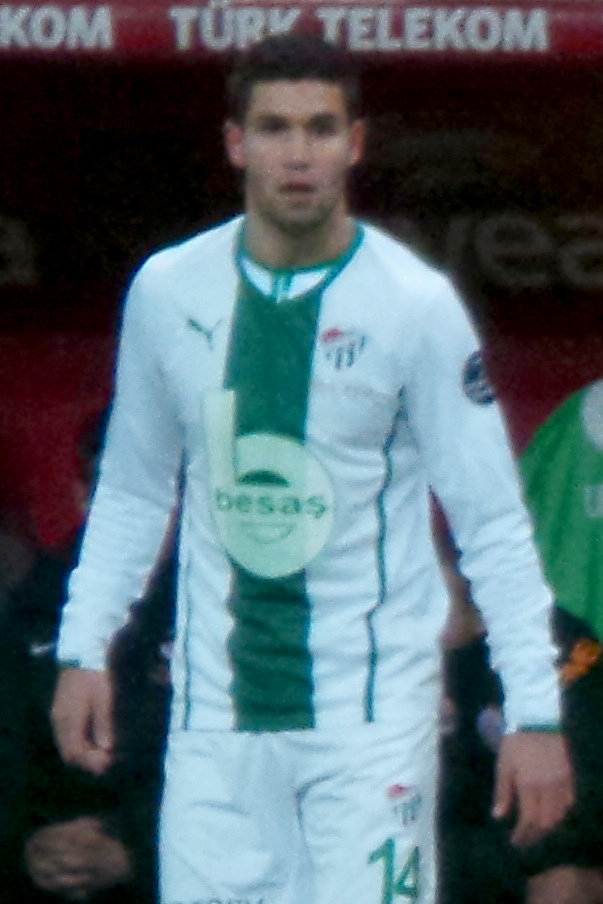
Oğuz Han Aynaoğlu

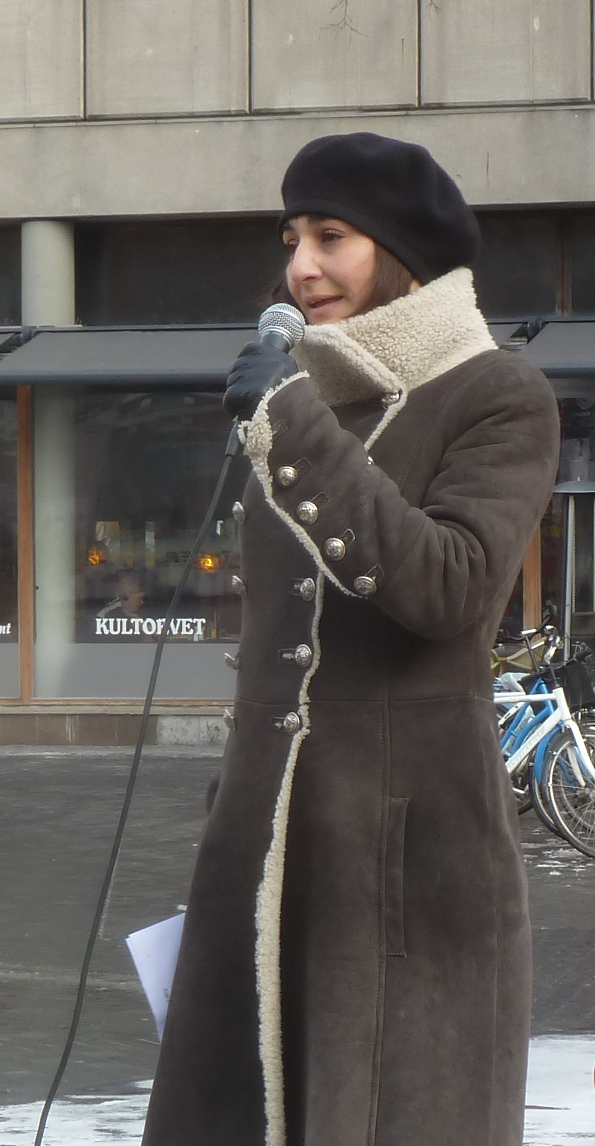
Ayfer Baykal

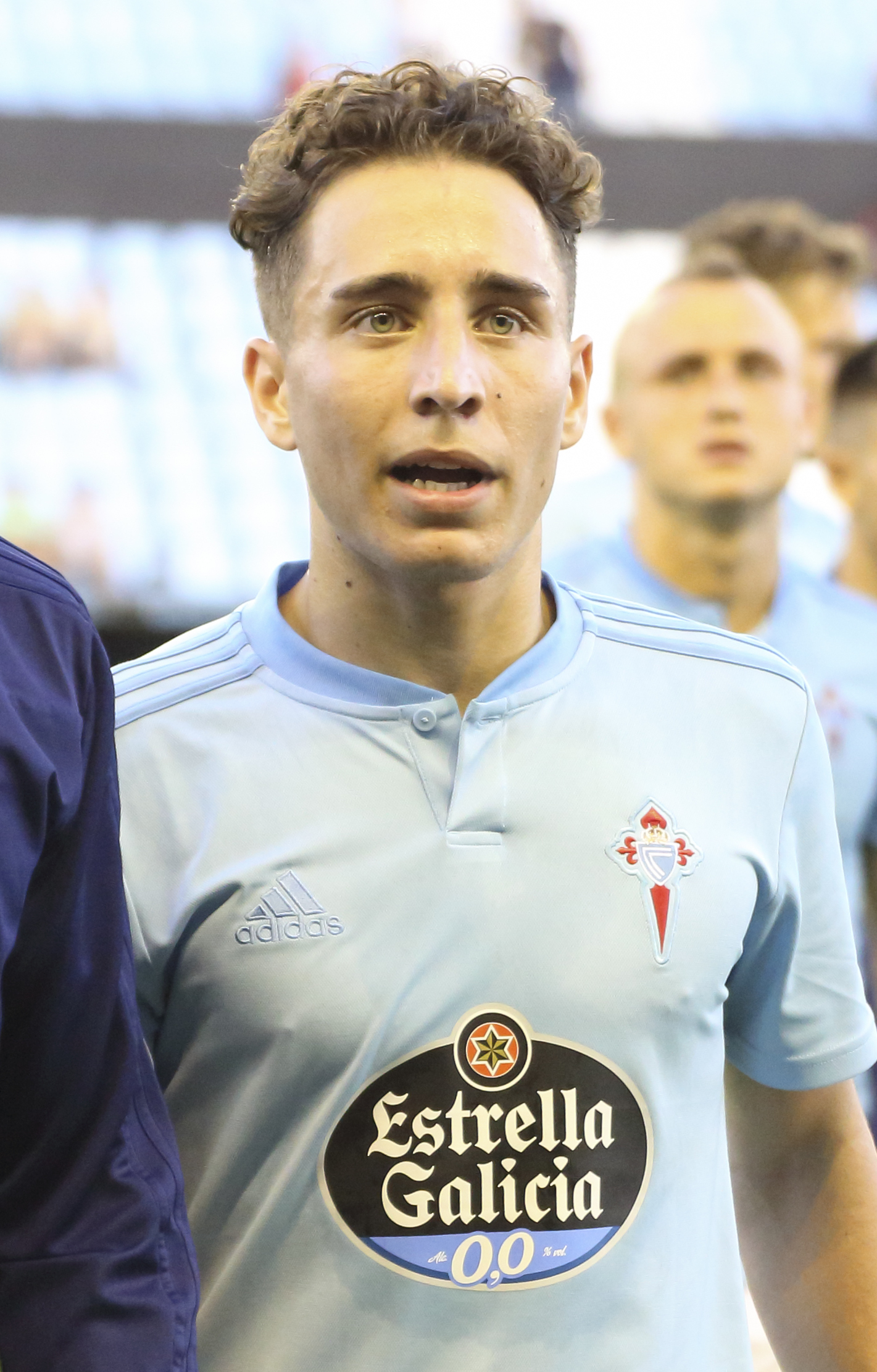
Emre Mor

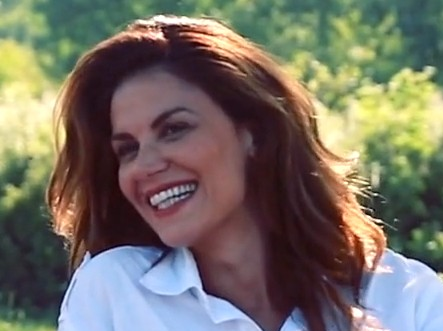
Tülin Şahin

- Yildiz Akdogan, politician
- Hasan Al, boxer
- Onur Albayrak, football player
- Fatih Alev, imam (Turkish Cypriot origin)
- Türker Alici, contestant on Robinson Ekspeditionen 2018
- Hüseyin Arac, politician
- Mehmet Ali Avci, film maker
- Yasin Avcı, football player
- Oğuz Han Aynaoğlu, football player
- Büsra Barut, female football player
- Ayfer Baykal, politician
- Zahide Bayram, crowned Miss Denmark (1999)
- Baris Balo Bicen, contestant on Robinson Ekspeditionen 2019
- Mustafa Bozkurt, football player
- Seckin Cem, contestant on Robinson Ekspeditionen 2007
- Dennis Ceylan, boxer
- Ercan, finalist on the X Factor 2010
- Buket Genc, contestant on Robinson Ekspeditionen 2013
- Ismail Gögenur, chief physician at Sjællands Universitetshospital, Køge
- Selin Kara, chemist and biotechnologist
- Gökcan Kaya, football player
- Ali Kazim, actor and rapper
- Sara Keçeci, handball player (Turkish father and Danish mother)
- Erkan Kilic, contestant on Baren 2001
- Hasan Kuruçay, football player
- Emre Mor, football player (Turkish father and Turkish Macedonian mother)
- Şaban Özdoğan, football player
- Yusuf Öztürk, football player
- Serden Özcan, is a professor
- Özlem Saglanmak, actress and voice actress
- Alev Ebüzziya Siesbye, ceramic artist
- Zidan Sertdemir, football player
- Aral Simsir, football player
- John Sytmen, businessman and former athlete (Turkish father and a Danish mother)
- Fatih Şahin, contestant on Robinson Ekspeditionen 2007
- Tülin Şahin, model and actress
- Sadi Tekelioglu, actor, politician and CEO of the Danish-Turkish newspaper Haber
- Ertuğrul Tekşen, football player
- Mona Tougaard, fashion model (Turkish, Danish, Somali, and Ethiopian descent)
- Ham VolKan, rapper (Turkish and Italian origin)
- Lone Yalcinkaya, politician

== See also ==
- Islam in Denmark
- Denmark–Turkey relations
- Turks in Europe
  - Turks in Finland
  - Turks in Germany
  - Turks in Norway
  - Turks in Sweden

== Bibliography ==
- Jørgensen, J.N (2002), "Children's Acquisition of Code-switching for Power-Wielding", in Auer, Peter (ed.), Code-Switching in Conversation: Language, Interaction and Identity, Routledge, ISBN 0-203-01788-9
- Liebig, Thomas (2007), The Labour Market Integration of Immigrants in Denmark (PDF), Organisation for Economic Co-operation and Development
- Nielsen, Jørgen S.; Akgonul, Samim; Alibasic, Ahmet (2009), Yearbook of Muslims in Europe, BRILL, ISBN 978-90-04-17505-1
- Organisation for Economic Co-operation and Development (2008). International Migration Outlook: SOPEMI 2008. OECD Publishing. ISBN 978-92-64-04565-1..
- Svanberg, Ingvar (1999), "The Nordic Countries", in Westerlund, David; Svanberg, Ingvar (eds.), Islam outside the Arab world, Palgrave Macmillan, ISBN 0-312-22691-8
