= Istanbul Unveiled =

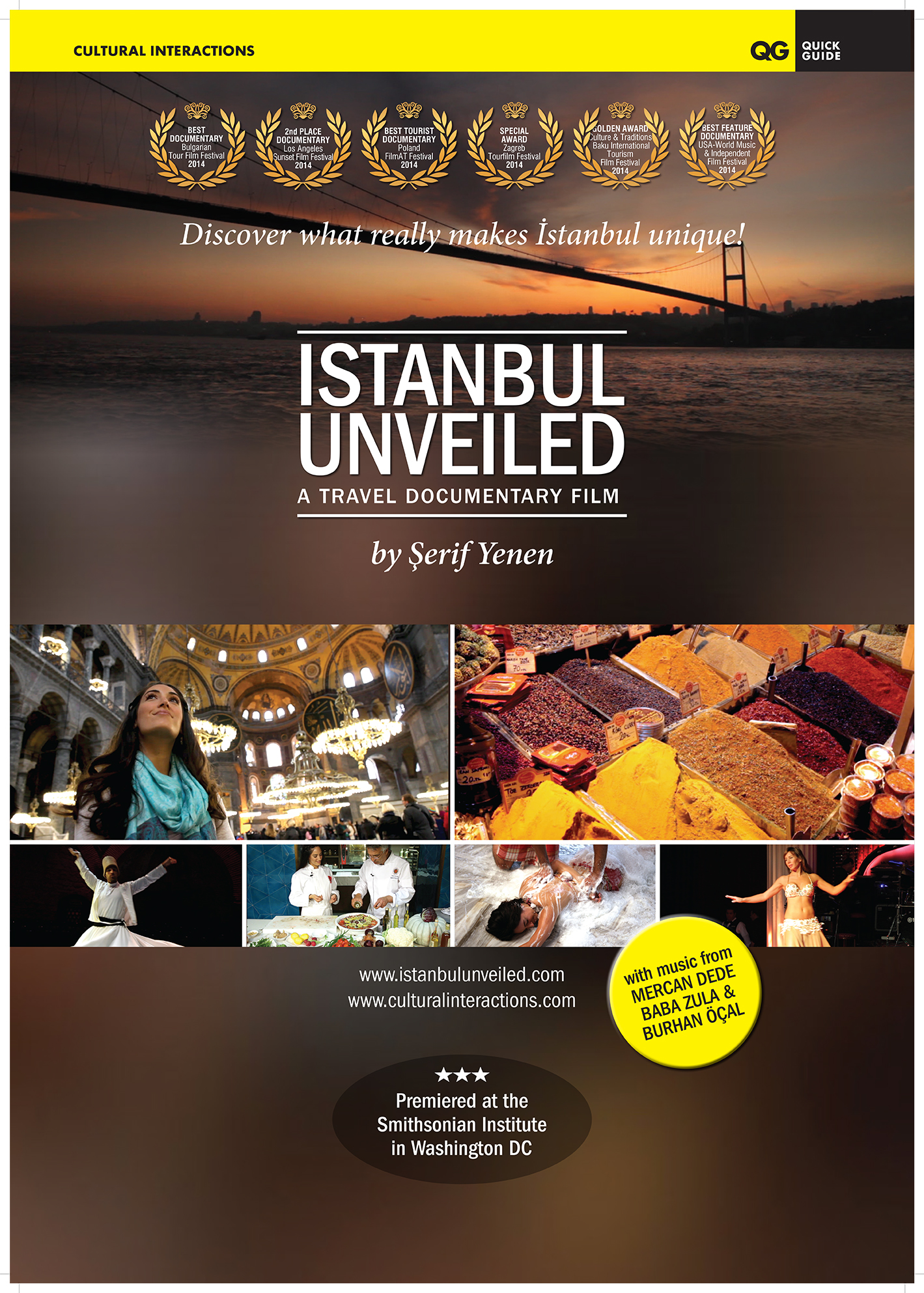
- Film poster
- Directed by: Levent Ayasli; Şerif Yenen
- Written by: Şerif Yenen
- Produced by: Saadet Özen, Şerif Yenen
- Starring: Jessica Berkmen
- Music by: Mercan Dede; Baba Zula; Burhan Öçal
- Release date: December 10, 2013
- Running time: 61 minutes
- Country: Turkey
- Language: English

Istanbul Unveiled is a 61-minute travel documentary film produced in English about Istanbul and Turkish culture in 2013.

Scriptwriter Şerif Yenen co-produced the film with Saadet Özen and co-directed it with Levent Ayasli. Hosted by American actress Jessica Berkmen, the footage took more than 2 years. The musical pieces composed by Mercan Dede, Baba Zula and Burhan Öçal have been used.

The documentary contains interviews with many people including Asena, Demet Sabancı, Dilek Hanif, Nadir Güllü, Nick Merdenyan, Tülin Şahin and Vedat Başaran.

== Awards and nominations ==
- Best Feature Documentary, World Music & Independent Film Festival, Washington D.C.
- Best Documentary, International Tourism Film Festival “On the East Coast of Europe”, Bulgaria
- Best Documentary, FilmAT - Film, Art & Tourism Festival, Poland
- Best Promotional Travel Movie, Tourism International Film Festival, Romania
- Special Award, Zagreb Tourfilm Festival, Croatia
- Nominee for the Grand Prix 2014, CIFFT, Austria
- Second Best Documentary, Sunset International Film Festival, Los Angeles

== Cast ==
- Jayda Berkmen as herself-Host

rest of cast listed alphabetically

- Asena as herself
- Vedat Başaran as himself
- Nadir Güllü as himself
- Dilek Hanif as herself
- Nick Merdenyan as himself
- Demet Sabancı as herself
- Tülin Şahin as herself
