= Turks in Norway =

Total population
- 20,000

Regions with significant populations
- Oslo; Drammen; Stavanger; Trondheim

Languages
- Turkish; Norwegian

Religion
- Predominantly Sunni Islam; Minority Alevism, Christianity, other religions, and irreligion

Related ethnic groups
- Turks in Denmark, Turks in Finland; Turks in Sweden

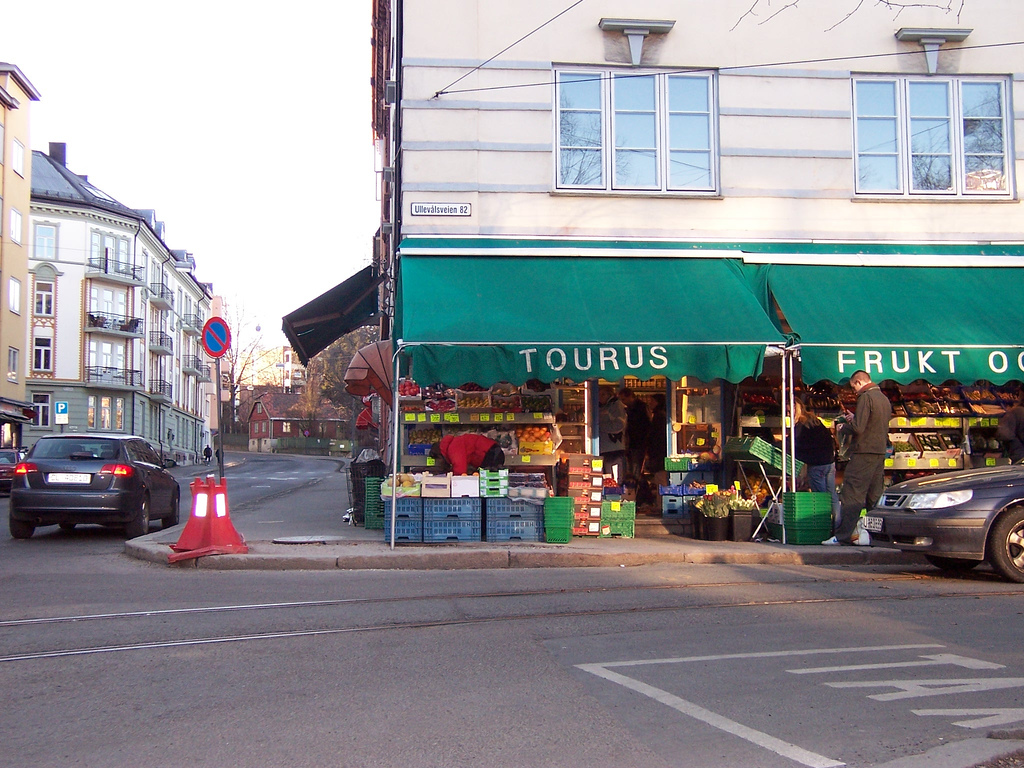
A Turkish store in Oslo.

Turks in Norway (Turkish: Norveç'teki Türkler) or Norwegian Turks (Turkish: Norveçli Türkler) refers to ethnic Turks living in Norway. The majority of Norwegian Turks descend from the Republic of Turkey; however there has also been Turkish migration from other post-Ottoman countries including ethnic Turkish communities which have come to Norway from the Balkans (e.g. from Bulgaria, Greece, Kosovo, North Macedonia and Romania), the island of Cyprus, and more recently Iraq and Syria.

== History ==
Throughout the 1970s Turkish immigrants came to Norway mostly from Turkey but also from other post-Ottoman countries with Turkish minorities; in particular Turks also migrated to Norway from the Balkans (such as Bosnian Turks and Romanian Turks) and the island of Cyprus. Many of these immigrants have since remained in Norway. In 1976 the borders were closed for further inward migration of this kind. During this period there was an increasing awareness and focusing on "foreign workers" in the political debate. A large proportion, more than 20% of the immigrants in Drammen are from Turkey. The major share of these came during the early labour motivated migration phase. Since the European migrant crisis, Iraq Turks and Syrian Turks have also migrated to Norway.

== Demographics ==
In 2013, there was roughly between 16,500 and 20,000 Norwegians of Turkish descent living in Norway.

The Norwegian-Turkish communities mostly live in the capital city of Oslo; however the highest proportion of Turks live in Drammen, a city within commuting distance of Oslo. There are also significant Turkish communities living in Stavanger, Trondheim, Bergen, Bærum, Kristiansand, Fredrikstad and Asker.

== Religion ==
As of 2008, there are 15,003 Turks in Norway who are Muslims. The Turkish community in Drammen bought the Adventist Church in Bragernes, Drammen in 2008 which will be turned into a mosque. The church was sold for 7.2 million kroner. The Turkish congregations is one of the biggest Muslim communities in Drammen, with about 1,000 members.

== See also ==
- Norway–Turkey relations
- Norwegian statistics by ethnic group
- Turks in Europe
  - Turks in Denmark
  - Turks in Finland
  - Turks in Russia
  - Turks in Sweden
- Islam in Norway
- Turkish Youth Association of Norway
