= Yenen =

Yenen is a surname. Notable people with the surname include:

- Şerif Yenen (born 1963), Turkish travel specialist, tour guide, travel writer, filmmaker, keynote speaker, and lecturer
- Tuba Yenen (born 1991), Turkish karateka

== See also ==
- Yemen
- Yenne
