= Onuray Köse =

Finnish footballer (born 1996)

Personal information
- Date of birth: 11 February 1996 (age 30)
- Place of birth: Lahti, Finland
- Height: 1.72 m (5 ft 7 1/2 in)
- Position: Midfielder

Team information
- Current team: Reipas

Senior career*
Years	Team	Apps	(Gls)
2013–2016	Lahti	4	(0)
2013–2016	Kuusysi	36	(2)
2015	→ MP (loan)	20	(0)
2016–2017	Yeşil Bursa	2	(0)
2017–2018	MP	42	(4)
2019	Reipas	6	(0)
2019–2021	Darıca Gençlerbirliği	47	(0)
2022–	Reipas	0	(0)
- * Club domestic league appearances and goals as of 27 March 2022

Onuray Köse (born 11 February 1996) is a Finnish football player who plays as midfielder for Reipas.

== Personal life ==
Köse is of Turkish descent. His older brother Ibrahim is a former footballer, and his younger brother Berat plays also for Reipas Lahti.
