= Şermin =

Şermin is a feminine Turkish given name. It may refer to:

- Şermin Langhoff (born 1969), Turkish-German theater producer and theater director
- Sermin Özürküt (born 1949), Turkish-Swedish politician
