= Serkan İnan =

Turkish-Swedish basketball player (born 1986)

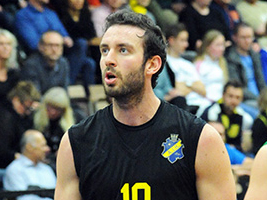

No. 10 – AIK Basket
- Position: Small forward

Personal information
- Born: 5 November 1986 (age 40) Sundbyberg, Sweden
- Listed height: 197 cm (6 ft 6 in)
- Listed weight: 90 kg (198 lb)

Career information
- Playing career: 2003–present

Career history
- 2003–2005: Solna Vikings
- 2005–2006: Fenerbahçe
- 2006–2008: Alpella
- 2008–2009: Kepez Belediyesi
- 2009–2010: Antalya BB
- 2010–2011: Oyak Renault
- 2011–2012: Solna Vikings
- 2012: Hacettepe Üniversitesi
- 2012–2013: Stockholm Eagles
- 2013–2015: Solna Vikings
- 2015–2023: AIK

Career highlights
- Turkish League All-Star (2010)

Serkan İnan (born 5 November 1986) is a Swedish-Turkish former professional basketball player who currently plays for the AIK of the Swedish 2nd division North Svealand. He has previously played for multiple teams in the Turkish Basketball League.

== Professional career ==
Inan began his professional career with the Solna Vikings in 2003 and went on to play two seasons for the club before moving to Turkey where he signed with Fenerbahçe for the 2005–06 season.

In 2006, Inan signed with Alpella where he went on to play two seasons for the club. After spending the 2008–09 season with Kepez Belediyesi, Inan joined Antalya BB in July 2009 where he spent the 2009–10 season.

On 1 December 2010, Inan signed with Oyak Renault for the rest of the 2010–11 season.

In 2011, Inan returned to Sweden and signed with the Solna Vikings for 2011–12 season, joining the club for a second stint. In January 2012, he left Solna after appearing in 14 games and went back to Turkey where he signed with Hacettepe Üniversitesi for the rest of the season.

Following the death of his father in April 2012, Inan returned to Sweden once again and signed with the Stockholm Eagles for the 2012–13 season.

On August 17, 2013, Inan signed with the Solna Vikings for the 2013–14 season, returning to the club for a third stint. However, he managed just nine games in 2013–14 after an injury sustained three games into the season kept him out of action for four months. Despite his poor showing, he re-signed with the club in August 2014 for the 2014–15 season.

Inan re-signed with AIK of the Swedish 2nd division North Svealand on September 3, 2020.

== International career ==
After playing for the Swedish national junior teams, Inan made his senior team debut in 2006 and has since made multiple appearance for Sweden.

== Personal ==
Inan's father, Mehmet, died in April 2012 after a long battle with cancer. His brother, Erkan, is also a professional basketball player; the two played alongside each other with the Solna Vikings in 2013–14.
