= Berat Köse =

Finnish footballer (born 1999)

Personal information
- Date of birth: 26 October 1999 (age 27)
- Place of birth: Lahti, Finland
- Height: 1.76 m (5 ft 9 in)
- Position: Attacking midfielder

Team information
- Current team: Reipas Lahti

Youth career
- Reipas Lahti
- Lahti

Senior career*
Years	Team	Apps	(Gls)
2019–2022	Reipas Lahti	43	(16)
2022	Lahti	3	(1)
2022	→ JäPS (loan)	9	(0)
2023	JäPS	12	(1)
2024–	Reipas Lahti	25	(15)
- * Club domestic league appearances and goals as of 1 November 2024

Berat Köse (born 26 October 1999) is a Finnish footballer who plays as a midfielder for Kakkonen club Reipas Lahti.

== Club career ==
Köse debuted in Veikkausliiga for FC Lahti first team in the 2022 season, and scored his first goal in the league, in a 3–1 loss against SJK. He joined Järvenpään Palloseura (JäPS) in second-tier Ykkönen, first on a loan deal in August 2022, and then on a permanent transfer for the 2023 season.

Köse returned to his former club Reipas Lahti for the 2024 season.

== Personal life ==
Born and raised in Finland, Köse is of Turkish descent. He has a dual citizenship of Finland and Turkey. His two older brothers are also footballers: Ibrahim has retired from professional career, and Onuray plays also for Reipas Lahti.

== Honours ==
JäPS

- Ykköscup: 2023
