= Turks in Finland =

Ethnic group in Finland

Turks in Finland / Finnish Turks Turkkilaiset Suomessa / Suomen turkkilaiset

Total population
- 12,975 born in Turkey; 13,790 Turkish speakers (2025)

Regions with significant populations
- Helsinki, Tampere and Turku regions & Oulu

Languages
- Turkish and Finnish

Religion
- Predominantly Sunni Islam; Minority Alevism, Christianity, other religions, and irreligion

Related ethnic groups
- Turks in Denmark, Turks in Norway, Turks in Sweden

Turks in Finland or Finnish Turks (Turkish: Finlandiya Türkleri; or Finlandiya'da yaşayan Türkler Finnish: Suomen turkkilaiset) are the ethnic Turkish people. The majority of Finnish Turks descend from the Republic of Turkey; however there has also been significant Turkish migration from other post-Ottoman countries including ethnic Turkish communities which have come to Finland from the Balkans, the island of Cyprus, and more recently Iraq and Syria.

As of 2025, there were 12,975 people born in Turkey living in Finland. Similarly, the number of people with Turkish citizenship was 8,537. The number of people who spoke Turkish as their mother tongue was 13,790.

== History ==
Turkish migration to Finland is a relatively new phenomenon in the country; the majority have predominantly arrived since the late 1980s and are made up of largely male immigrants. Thus, many Turkish adolescents have a Finnish mother. Between 1987 and 2012 there have been 8,904 Turkish citizens who have migrated to Finland. In 2019, Turkish asylum seekers are the second largest group after Iraqis. From January to August, 283 Turkish citizens have sought asylum, while for the whole of 2018 it was 293. Their number by the end of the year is projected to be 45% more than the last year. According to Finnish Immigration Service, many Turks are seeking asylum due to the Gülen movement.

== Demographics ==
Historical population
| Year | Pop. | ±% p.a. |
|---|---|---|
| 1990 | 848 | — |
| 1995 | 1,809 | +16.36% |
| 2000 | 2,435 | +6.12% |
| 2005 | 3,595 | +8.10% |
| 2010 | 5,374 | +8.37% |
| 2015 | 7,082 | +5.67% |
| 2020 | 9,492 | +6.03% |
| 2025 | 13,790 | +7.76% |
Turkish speakers. Source: Statistics Finland

People born in Turkey and living in Finland, according to Statistics Finland.

Country of birth Turkey by municipality (2024)
| Municipality | Population |
|---|---|
| Whole country | 12,202 |
| Helsinki | 2,495 |
| Vantaa | 1,414 |
| Espoo | 1,376 |
| Tampere | 735 |
| Turku | 498 |
| Oulu | 378 |
| Jyväskylä | 282 |
| Lahti | 270 |
| Kerava | 226 |
| Hämeenlinna | 220 |
| Lappeenranta | 202 |
| Pori | 174 |
| Kouvola | 172 |
| Kuopio | 170 |
| Seinäjoki | 135 |
| Lohja | 133 |
| Porvoo | 123 |
| Joensuu | 114 |
| Vihti | 108 |
| Rauma | 100 |
| Kotka | 96 |
| Järvenpää | 91 |
| Vaasa | 82 |
| Riihimäki | 80 |
| Hyvinkää | 77 |
| Nurmijärvi | 74 |
| Salo | 71 |
| Tuusula | 67 |
| Mikkeli | 64 |
| Kirkkonummi | 61 |
| Nokia | 56 |
| Imatra | 52 |
| Ilmajoki | 51 |
| Forssa | 50 |
| Rovaniemi | 47 |
| Sipoo | 46 |
| Tornio | 45 |
| Mäntsälä | 43 |
| Kokkola | 42 |
| Uusikaupunki | 42 |
| Akaa | 41 |
| Savonlinna | 41 |
| Pietarsaari | 39 |
| Heinola | 37 |
| Raisio | 36 |
| Kangasala | 31 |
| Varkaus | 31 |
| Loimaa | 29 |
| Äänekoski | 29 |
| Eura | 28 |
| Janakkala | 28 |
| Kankaanpää | 26 |
| Orimattila | 26 |
| Karkkila | 25 |
| Huittinen | 24 |
| Kaarina | 24 |
| Kemi | 24 |
| Kajaani | 23 |
| Mariehamn | 23 |
| Ylivieska | 23 |
| Kuusamo | 22 |
| Raahe | 22 |
| Raseborg | 22 |
| Hamina | 21 |
| Laitila | 21 |
| Outokumpu | 21 |
| Ylöjärvi | 21 |
| Lapua | 20 |
| Valkeakoski | 19 |
| Lempäälä | 18 |
| Pirkkala | 18 |
| Harjavalta | 17 |
| Sastamala | 17 |
| Ylitornio | 17 |
| Alajärvi | 16 |
| Jämsä | 16 |
| Kauhajoki | 16 |
| Kempele | 15 |
| Parkano | 15 |
| Pieksämäki | 15 |
| Suomussalmi | 15 |
| Haapajärvi | 14 |
| Hämeenkyrö | 14 |
| Iisalmi | 14 |
| Kittilä | 14 |
| Hollola | 13 |
| Kauniainen | 13 |
| Lieksa | 13 |
| Kitee | 12 |
| Kokemäki | 12 |
| Säkylä | 12 |
| Eurajoki | 11 |
| Loviisa | 11 |
| Nurmes | 11 |
| Laukaa | 10 |
| Korsholm | 10 |
| Mänttä-Vilppula | 10 |
| Pudasjärvi | 10 |
| Utajärvi | 10 |

People with Turkish citizenship living in Finland according to Statistics Finland.

Citizens of Turkey by municipality (2024)
| Municipality | Population |
|---|---|
| Whole country | 8,290 |
| Helsinki | 1,555 |
| Espoo | 1,012 |
| Vantaa | 910 |
| Tampere | 536 |
| Turku | 320 |
| Oulu | 285 |
| Jyväskylä | 205 |
| Hämeenlinna | 168 |
| Lahti | 166 |
| Kerava | 154 |
| Lappeenranta | 150 |
| Pori | 135 |
| Kouvola | 132 |
| Kuopio | 111 |
| Seinäjoki | 97 |
| Lohja | 93 |
| Porvoo | 88 |
| Joensuu | 84 |
| Rauma | 73 |
| Riihimäki | 63 |
| Kotka | 62 |
| Vihti | 61 |
| Järvenpää | 57 |
| Vaasa | 54 |
| Ilmajoki | 53 |
| Nurmijärvi | 52 |
| Imatra | 50 |
| Hyvinkää | 49 |
| Salo | 49 |
| Kirkkonummi | 44 |
| Kokkola | 41 |
| Nokia | 41 |
| Tuusula | 38 |
| Mikkeli | 36 |
| Mäntsälä | 35 |
| Uusikaupunki | 32 |
| Sipoo | 30 |
| Rovaniemi | 29 |
| Loimaa | 27 |
| Varkaus | 27 |
| Heinola | 26 |
| Kankaanpää | 26 |
| Savonlinna | 26 |
| Ylivieska | 26 |
| Hamina | 25 |
| Raisio | 25 |
| Forssa | 23 |
| Kangasala | 23 |
| Tornio | 23 |
| Akaa | 22 |
| Eura | 21 |
| Huittinen | 21 |
| Janakkala | 21 |
| Pietarsaari | 20 |
| Raahe | 20 |
| Laitila | 19 |
| Orimattila | 19 |
| Äänekoski | 19 |
| Karkkila | 18 |
| Kuusamo | 16 |
| Haapajärvi | 14 |
| Kemi | 14 |
| Lieksa | 14 |
| Kajaani | 13 |
| Kempele | 13 |
| Mariehamn | 13 |
| Parkano | 13 |
| Ylöjärvi | 13 |
| Alajärvi | 12 |
| Outokumpu | 12 |
| Pieksämäki | 12 |
| Sastamala | 12 |
| Hämeenkyrö | 11 |
| Iisalmi | 11 |
| Jämsä | 11 |
| Kitee | 11 |
| Lempäälä | 11 |
| Pirkkala | 11 |
| Raseborg | 11 |
| Säkylä | 11 |
| Valkeakoski | 11 |
| Harjavalta | 10 |
| Kaarina | 10 |
| Utajärvi | 10 |

People with Turkish as mother tongue living in Finland according to Statistics Finland.

Turkish speakers by municipality (2024)
| Municipality | Population |
|---|---|
| Whole country | 12,964 |
| Helsinki | 2,526 |
| Vantaa | 1,639 |
| Espoo | 1,554 |
| Tampere | 793 |
| Turku | 536 |
| Oulu | 413 |
| Lahti | 312 |
| Jyväskylä | 300 |
| Kerava | 273 |
| Hämeenlinna | 233 |
| Lappeenranta | 191 |
| Pori | 180 |
| Kuopio | 164 |
| Lohja | 162 |
| Kouvola | 154 |
| Seinäjoki | 142 |
| Rauma | 121 |
| Porvoo | 117 |
| Hyvinkää | 116 |
| Vihti | 109 |
| Kotka | 101 |
| Vaasa | 100 |
| Järvenpää | 96 |
| Riihimäki | 95 |
| Joensuu | 91 |
| Salo | 79 |
| Kirkkonummi | 70 |
| Nokia | 65 |
| Tuusula | 65 |
| Nurmijärvi | 58 |
| Rovaniemi | 54 |
| Ilmajoki | 53 |
| Mäntsälä | 49 |
| Akaa | 44 |
| Raisio | 43 |
| Sipoo | 43 |
| Uusikaupunki | 43 |
| Kokkola | 42 |
| Mikkeli | 41 |
| Forssa | 40 |
| Savonlinna | 38 |
| Tornio | 37 |
| Heinola | 35 |
| Imatra | 34 |
| Eura | 32 |
| Laitila | 30 |
| Janakkala | 29 |
| Loimaa | 29 |
| Ylöjärvi | 29 |
| Hamina | 28 |
| Huittinen | 28 |
| Kajaani | 28 |
| Ylivieska | 28 |
| Raahe | 27 |
| Kaarina | 26 |
| Kuusamo | 26 |
| Varkaus | 25 |
| Kangasala | 24 |
| Kankaanpää | 24 |
| Karkkila | 24 |
| Mariehamn | 24 |
| Raseborg | 24 |
| Orimattila | 23 |
| Kemi | 22 |
| Pietarsaari | 22 |
| Hämeenkyrö | 21 |
| Äänekoski | 21 |
| Alajärvi | 20 |
| Iisalmi | 20 |
| Lempäälä | 20 |
| Jämsä | 19 |
| Lapua | 19 |
| Hollola | 18 |
| Kittilä | 18 |
| Sastamala | 18 |
| Harjavalta | 17 |
| Kauhajoki | 17 |
| Nurmes | 17 |
| Valkeakoski | 17 |
| Kitee | 16 |
| Kempele | 15 |
| Parkano | 15 |
| Säkylä | 15 |
| Utajärvi | 15 |
| Pieksämäki | 14 |
| Haapajärvi | 13 |
| Pirkkala | 13 |
| Suonenjoki | 13 |
| Lieksa | 12 |
| Paimio | 12 |
| Siilinjärvi | 12 |
| Alavus | 11 |
| Eurajoki | 11 |
| Hattula | 11 |
| Karstula | 11 |
| Kauniainen | 11 |
| Kristinestad | 11 |
| Laukaa | 11 |
| Somero | 11 |
| Luumäki | 10 |
| Mäntyharju | 10 |

== Society ==
65.5% of them are male while 34.5% are female. 22.2% are less than 14 years old, 76.7% are between 15 and 64 years old and only 1.1% are over the age 65.

The majority of Turkish immigrants are self-employed and are predominantly active in the restaurant and fast food sector.

== Organizations ==
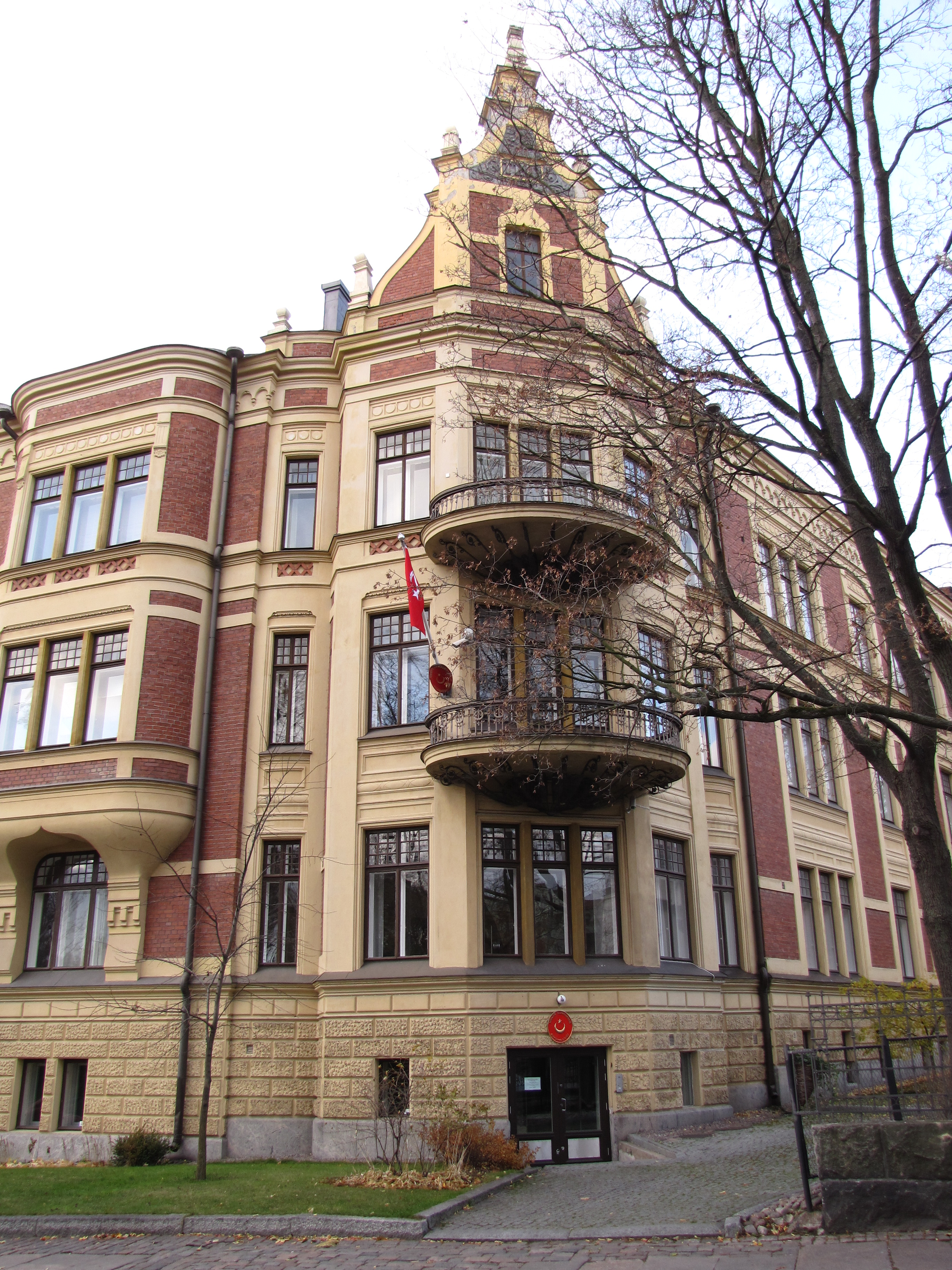
Turkish Embassy in Helsinki, Finland

- Suomen turkkilainen seura

== Political activism ==
As in May 2022 Finland made an accession bid to join NATO, Turkey demanded that Finland ends its alleged support for the Gülen movement.

== Notable people ==
- Erol Ates, football manager and former player
- Fikret Güler, Turkish taekwondo Grand Master
- Oliver Günes, football player
- Mehmet Gürs, chef (Turkish father)
- Tilma Hainari, women's activist and public enlightener (her mother, Adolfina Sofia Soldan, was a descendant of Sadok Seli Soltan who was the first documented Turk in Germany)
- Sinem Kurtbay, sailor (Turkish father)
- Berat Köse, football player
- Ibrahim Köse, football player
- Onary Köse, footballer
- Kaan Kairinen, football player (Turkish father)
- Melek Mazici, visual artist
- Anton Odabasi, basketball player (Turkish father)
- Mert Otsamo, fashion designer (Turkish father)
- Masar Ömer, football player
- Teuvo Tulio, film director
- Ozan Yanar, former member of the Finnish Parliament
- Sini Yasemin, singer (Turkish father)
- Taha Özcelik, football player

== See also ==
- Finland–Turkey relations
- Kebakko
- Eerikin Pippuri
- Turks in Europe
  - Turks in Denmark
  - Turks in Japan
  - Turks in Estonia
  - Turks in Norway
  - Turks in Russia
  - Turks in Sweden
- Finnish Tatars
- Kurds in Finland
- Islam in Finland

== Bibliography ==
- Östen, Wahlbeck (2007), "Work in the kebab economy - A study of the ethnic economy of Turkish immigrants in Finland", Ethnicities, 7 (4): 543–563, doi:10.1177/1468796807084016, hdl:2262/52615, S2CID 143540781
- Östen, Wahlbeck (2008), "Entrepreneurship as Social Status: Turkish Immigrants' Experiences of Self-Employment in Finland" (PDF), Migration Letters, 5 (1): 53–62, doi:10.33182/ml.v5i1.58, archived from the original on September 5, 2008
- Phinney, Jean S.; Berry, John W.; Sam, David L.; Vedder, Paul (2006), "Understanding Immigrant Youth: Conclusions and Implications", in Berry, John W. (ed.), Immigrant Youth in Cultural Transition: Acculturation, Identity, and Adaptation Across National Contexts, Routledge, ISBN 978-0-8058-5156-4.
