= Turkish Odyssey =

- Author: Şerif Yenen
- Language: English
- Genre: Guidebook
- Publication date: September 1998
- Publication place: Turkey
- Media type: Print
- Pages: 560
- ISBN: 978-975-94638-0-9

Turkish Odyssey, A Cultural Guide to Turkey is a guidebook written by Şerif Yenen, it is the “first guidebook of Turkey ever written by a Turk”.

The book has been translated into multiple languages and its various editions are used in academia. A comprehensive, revised, and expanded three-volume edition was released in 2025.

== Publication History ==
The first English edition was published in September 1998 (ISBN 978-975-94638-0-9). A multimedia version supplemented with a CD-ROM was released in 2001 (ISBN 975-96953-0-8).

The work has been translated into several other languages, including:

- Turkish: Anadolu Destanı, Türkiye Gezi Rehberi (ISBN 978-975-94638-1-6)
- Italian: In Turchia, Un Viaggio nella Cultura Anatolica (ISBN 975-96953-1-6)
- German: Die Türkische Odyssee, Ein Kulturreiseführer für die Türkei (ISBN 978-975-96953-2-3)

In 2022, an updated and revised print edition of the Turkish version, Anadolu Destanı, was released by Alfa Yayınları (ISBN 978-625-449-597-7).

In 2025, Yenen published a comprehensive, revised, and expanded three-volume boxed set titled Turkish Odyssey: A Cultural Guide to Türkiye (ISBN 978-605-74625-7-2).

== Academic Use ==
The guidebook is used as a textbook or is on suggested reading lists at several universities for courses on tourism and Anatolian civilizations.
