= Emre Mor =

Danish-Turkish footballer (born 1997)

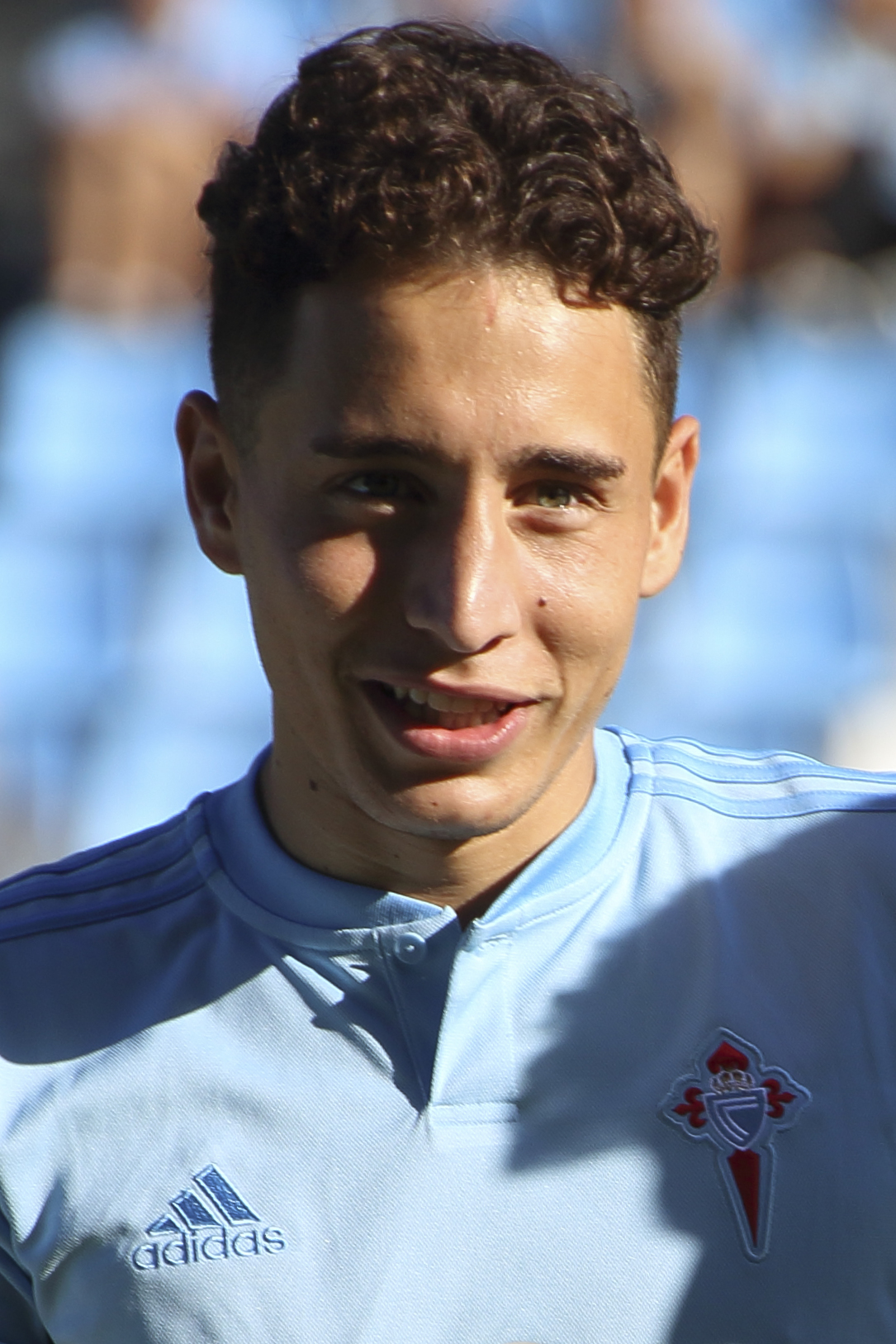
- Mor with Celta Vigo in 2018

Personal information
- Full name: Emre Mor
- Date of birth: 24 July 1997 (age 29)
- Place of birth: Copenhagen, Denmark
- Height: 1.69 m (5 ft 7 in)
- Positions: Winger; wide midfielder

Team information
- Current team: NEC
- Number: 7

Youth career
- 2001–2006: Brønshøj BK
- 2006–2015: Lyngby BK
- 2015: Nordsjælland

Senior career*
Years	Team	Apps	(Gls)
2015–2016	Nordsjælland	13	(2)
2016–2017	Borussia Dortmund	12	(1)
2017–2022	Celta Vigo	44	(1)
2019–2020	→ Galatasaray (loan)	10	(0)
2020	→ Olympiacos (loan)	0	(0)
2021–2022	→ Fatih Karagümrük (loan)	26	(5)
2022–2026	Fenerbahçe	34	(2)
2024	→ Fatih Karagümrük (loan)	10	(1)
2024–2025	→ Eyüpspor (loan)	18	(1)
2026–	NEC	4	(0)

International career
2013–2014	Denmark U17	10	(2)
2014–2015	Denmark U18	12	(1)
2015	Denmark U19	9	(2)
2016	Turkey U21	1	(0)
2016–2017	Turkey	15	(1)
- * Club domestic league appearances and goals as of 22:06, 12 September 2026 (UTC)

Emre Mor (born 24 July 1997) is a professional footballer who plays as a winger or wide midfielder for Eredivisie club NEC. Born in Denmark, he represented the Turkey national team.

== Early life ==
Emre Mor was born and raised in Brønshøj, Copenhagen, Denmark, to a mother from North Macedonia and a Turkish father. He holds Danish and Turkish citizenship.

== Club career ==
=== Early career ===
At the age of 16 in December 2013, Mor was on a trial training with Saint-Étienne but did not receive a contract.

Mor played at Lyngby on U17 and U19 levels before he was released by the club in January 2015. The message from the club was that "the conclusion is that the talent can not be redeemed in Lyngby Boldklub". In 2016, it was reported that he was released due to attitude problems.

=== FC Nordsjælland ===
On 31 January 2015, it was confirmed, that Mor had signed a contract with FC Nordsjælland, despite being courted by other clubs in the Superliga and abroad. The original intent was for Mor to play for the U19.

Mor got his official debut for FCN on 28 November 2015. Mor started on the bench, but replaced Guðmundur Þórarinsson in the 84th minute in a 0–1 defeat against Randers FC in the Danish Superliga. In the next league match after his debut, Mor was in the starting lineup against Brøndby IF. Mor's performance earned him a new contract and a promotion to the first team squad from January 2016.

=== Borussia Dortmund ===
Borussia Dortmund confirmed signing Mor on 7 June 2016, announcing a five-year contract.

In a training session after a defeat against Bayern Munich in April 2017, Mor and his teammates were sent on a run by manager Thomas Tuchel and physical trainer Rainer Schrey. When Tuchel and Schrey instructed Mor to continue on for an extra round, Mor reportedly loudly protested, which prompted a fiery reaction from Tuchel. Earlier on the year, it was also reported that Dortmund were dissatisfied with Mor's attitude and willingness to integrate into the team.

He made only 12 appearances in the Bundesliga and UEFA Champions League for Borussia Dortmund during the 2016–17 season, usually as a substitute on the right wing or in attacking midfield.

=== Celta Vigo ===
On 29 August 2017, Mor signed for Spanish club Celta Vigo for a reported €13 million, making him the second most expensive signing in the club's history. He struggled for playing time, starting only one league match and playing 384 minutes before mid-December.

Emre has to understand that technical skill is not enough to earn him more playing time. There are no miracles or coincidences. Mentally, he needs to change.

— Celta coach Juan Carlos Unzué on Mor's lack of playing time, December 2017

Mor's first season was disrupted by repeated disciplinary problems. In April 2018, having already been left out of two matchday squads, he arrived late for training before a home game against Sevilla, prompting Unzué to reiterate that Mor needed to change his attitude to return to the side. Mor apologised on social media, writing that he had only himself to blame and that it would not happen again. He was made to train alone for a period, and in May 2018 was again sent home early from training; he did not feature again for the remainder of the season.

Mor's situation did not improve under new manager Miguel Cardoso at the start of the 2018–19 season, and he played just 38 minutes in the opening eight league matches. In January 2019 he was again excluded from training over what the club described as indiscipline, and was left out of the following eight league matches for more than a month before being reinstated to first-team training at the end of February.

==== Galatasaray (loan) ====
On 31 July 2019, Galatasaray announced via social media that Mor had joined the club on a season-long loan.

==== Olympiacos (loan) ====
On 31 January 2020, Olympiacos confirmed the signing of Mor, on loan from Celta Vigo for the remainder of the 2019–20 season. Olympiacos would pay Celta Vigo a loan fee of €410,000 and Galatasaray would cover €290,000 from the contract. Celta Vigo had announced that the deal provided for a compulsory purchase by Olympiacos at the end of the 2019–20 season if specific player goals were met, as agreed between the two clubs, indicated that the compulsory purchase option was set at €4,000,000 and this amount would be paid by the Greek side Mor plays at least half of Olympiacos' matches before the end of the season, with a future resale rate for the Spanish club between 10% and 20%.

==== Fatih Karagümrük (loan) ====
On 26 August 2021, Mor returned to Turkey to join Süper Lig side Fatih Karagümrük on a season-long loan deal. On 18 March 2022, Mor scored his first hat-trick against Kayserispor.

=== Fenerbahçe ===
On 2 July 2022, Mor joined Fenerbahçe on a permanent transfer, signing a three-year contract.

==== Return to Fatih Karagümrük (loan) ====
On 1 January 2024, Fenerbahçe announced that Mor signed a contract with his old club Fatih Karagümrük for the latter half of the 2023–24 Süper Lig season with no option to make the move permanent.

=== NEC ===
On 20 July 2026, following a trial, Mor signed a two-year contract with Eredivisie club NEC. He made his debut on 4 August, coming on as a substitute in a goalless away draw with his former club Olympiacos in the third qualifying round of the UEFA Champions League. His league debut followed four days later in a 2–1 home defeat by Telstar.

On 11 August, Mor scored his first goal for the club, an extra-time winner in the return leg against Olympiacos that sealed a 2–1 win and took NEC through to the play-off round. Earlier in the same match, he had been due to replace the injured Sami Ouaissa but was held on the touchline for several minutes because he was unable to remove an earring, which match officials would not allow him to cover; the delay drew criticism in the media and from his coach, Dick Schreuder.

== International career ==
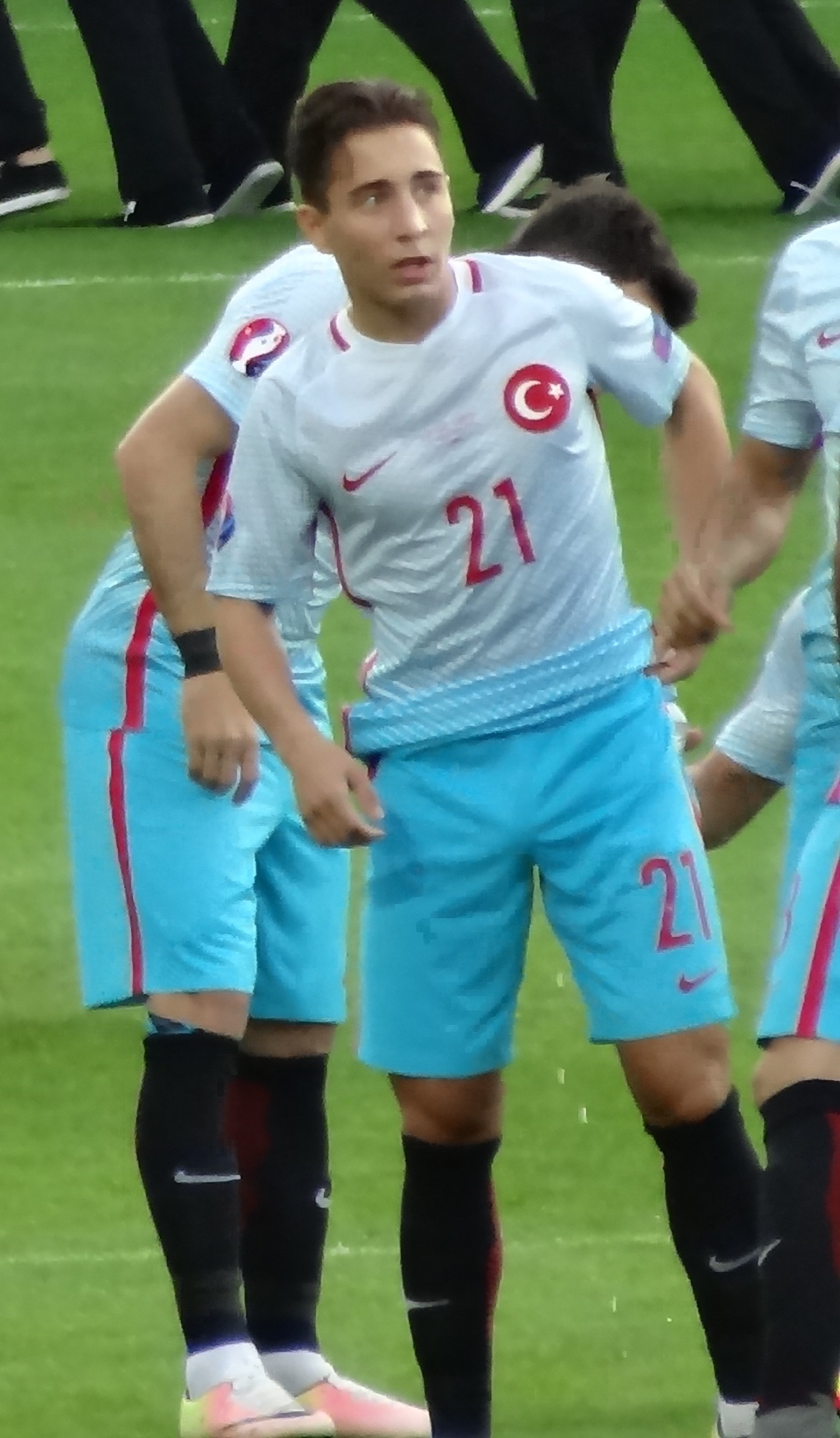
Mor with Turkey at UEFA Euro 2016

He represented Denmark in their U17, U18, and U19 teams. However, in 2016 he switched allegiances to the Turkish Football Federation, with his father having to sign Mor's citizenship papers from a prison cell while serving a sentence for a driving offense. Mor was called up to the Turkey U21 team, in a 2017 UEFA European Under-21 Championship qualification match against the Slovakia U21.

Mor made his senior debut for Turkey against Montenegro in Antalya in May 2016. He was included in the Turkey senior team's squad for UEFA Euro 2016, making him the third-youngest player at the tournament. He came off the bench to replace Cenk Tosun in Turkey's opening Euro 2016 game against Croatia. He was also part of the starting 11 in the last match Turkey played in the 2016 European Championship against the Czech Republic and made an assist to Burak Yılmaz for the opening goal. In March 2025, after a nearly 8-year absence from the national team, Mor was re-called to the Turkish squad for the Nations League matches against Hungary on 20 and 23 March respectively.

== Personal life ==
His mother Güzele Bekirov is Turkish-Macedonian and his father Ersoy Mor is Turkish from Uşak, Turkey.

== Career statistics ==
=== Club ===
As of match played 12 September 2026

Appearances and goals by club, season and competition
Club	Season	League			National cup (Note: Includes DFB-Pokal, Copa del Rey, Turkish Cup, Greek Football Cup)		Continental		Other		Total	
Club	Season	Division	Apps	Goals	Apps	Goals	Apps	Goals	Apps	Goals	Apps	Goals
Nordsjælland	2015–16	Danish Superliga	13	2	0	0	—		—		14	3
Borussia Dortmund	2016–17	Bundesliga	12	1	3	0	3 (Note: Appearances in UEFA Champions League)	0	1 (Note: Appearance in DFL-Supercup)	0	19	1
Celta Vigo	2017–18	La Liga	23	1	4	0	—		—		27	1
Celta Vigo	2018–19	La Liga	10	0	2	0	—		—		12	0
Celta Vigo	2020–21	La Liga	11	0	2	1	—		—		13	1
Celta Vigo	Total		44	1	8	1	0	0	0	0	52	2
Galatasaray (loan)	2019–20	Süper Lig	10	0	2	0	4	0	1 (Note: Appearance in Turkish Super Cup)	0	17	0
Olympiacos (loan)	2019–20	Super League Greece	0	0	2	0	0	0	—		2	0
Fatih Karagümrük (loan)	2021–22	Süper Lig	26	5	3	1	—		—		29	6
Fatih Karagümrük (loan)	2023–24	Süper Lig	9	1	4	0	—		—		13	1
Fatih Karagümrük (loan)	Total		35	6	7	1	—		—		42	7
Fenerbahçe SK	2022–23	Süper Lig	28	2	4	2	9 (Note: One appearances in UEFA Champions League, eight appearances and two goals in UEFA Europa League)	2	—		41	6
Fenerbahçe SK	2023–24	Süper Lig	6	0	1	0	1 (Note: Appearance in UEFA Europa Conference League)	0	—		8	0
Fenerbahçe SK	Total		34	2	5	2	10	2	—		49	6
Eyüpspor (loan)	2024–25	Süper Lig	18	1	4	1	—		—		22	2
NEC	2026–27	Eredivisie	4	0	0	0	3	1	—		7	1
Career total			170	13	31	5	20	3	2	0	223	21

=== International ===
Appearances and goals by national team and year
National team	Year	Apps	Goals
Turkey
Turkey	2016	8 (Note: Two appearances in UEFA Euro 2016)	0
Turkey	2017	7	1
Total		15	1

Scores and results table list Turkey's goal tally first, score column indicates score after each Mor goal.

List of international goals scored by Emre Mor
No.	Date	Venue	Opponent	Score	Result	Competition
1	27 March 2017	New Eskişehir Stadium, Eskişehir, Turkey	Moldova	1–0	3–1	Friendly

== Honours ==
Borussia Dortmund

- DFB-Pokal: 2016–17

Galatasaray

- Turkish Super Cup: 2019

Olympiacos

- Super League Greece: 2019–20
- Greek Cup: 2019–20

Fenerbahçe

- Turkish Cup: 2022–23
