= Oliver Günes =

Finnish footballer (born 2002)

Personal information
- Full name: Oliver Leo Aurel Günes
- Date of birth: 24 December 2002 (age 23)
- Place of birth: Mikkeli, Finland
- Height: 1.74 m (5 ft 9 in)
- Position: Midfielder

Team information
- Current team: EIF
- Number: 30

Youth career
- –2014: NJS
- 2015–2020: Espoo

Senior career*
Years	Team	Apps	(Gls)
2020	Espoo	17	(5)
2021–2024	SJK	1	(0)
2021–2024	SJK II	72	(10)
2024	24 Erzincanspor	3	(0)
2025	Karabük İdman Yurdu	3	(0)
2025–2026	Gnistan	15	(0)
2026–	EIF	18	(0)
- * Club domestic league appearances and goals as of 1 November 2026

Oliver Leo Aurel Günes (born 24 December 2002) is a Finnish professional footballer who plays as a midfielder for Ykkösliiga club EIF.

== Club career ==
Günes debuted in top tier Veikkausliiga with SJK first team in 2021, but played mostly with the club's academy squad SJK Akatemia in Finnish second-tier. His contract was terminated on mutual agreement on 30 April 2024.

On 16 August 2024, Günes joined 24 Erzincanspor in Turkish third-tier TFF 2. Lig.

In January 2025, he joined Karabük İdman Yurdu in TFF 3. Lig.

On 25 March 2025, he returned to Finland and signed for Veikkausliiga club IF Gnistan.

== Personal life ==
Günes was born in Mikkeli, Finland, to a Finnish mother and a Turkish father. He was raised in Espoo, Finland.

== Career statistics ==
As of 26 July 2026

Appearances and goals by club, season and competition
Club	Season	League			Cup (Note: Includes Suomen Cup and Turkish Cup)		League cup (Note: Includes Finnish League Cup, Ykköscup and Ykkösliigacup)		Total	
Club	Season	Division	Apps	Goals	Apps	Goals	Apps	Goals	Apps	Goals
Espoo II	2019	Kolmonen	1	0	–		–		1	0
Espoo	2020	Kakkonen	17	5	–		–		17	5
SJK Seinäjoki	2021	Veikkausliiga	1	0	0	0	–		1	0
SJK Seinäjoki	2022	Veikkausliiga	0	0	0	0	0	0	0	0
SJK Seinäjoki	2023	Veikkausliiga	0	0	0	0	1	0	1	0
SJK Seinäjoki	2024	Veikkausliiga	0	0	0	0	4	0	4	0
SJK Seinäjoki	Total		1	0	0	0	5	0	6	0
SJK Akatemia	2021	Kakkonen	19	5	6	0	–		25	5
SJK Akatemia	2022	Ykkönen	23	1	2	0	3	0	28	1
SJK Akatemia	2023	Ykkönen	29	4	0	0	4	0	33	4
SJK Akatemia	2024	Ykkösliiga	1	0	0	0	1	0	2	0
SJK Akatemia	Total		72	10	8	0	8	0	88	10
24 Erzincanspor	2024–25	TFF 2. Lig	3	0	1	0	–		4	0
Karabük İdman Yurdu	2024–25	TFF 3. Lig	3	0	–		–		3	0
IF Gnistan	2025	Veikkausliiga	15	0	3	1	0	0	18	1
IF Gnistan	2026	Veikkausliiga	0	0	0	0	1	0	1	0
IF Gnistan	Total		15	0	3	1	1	0	19	1
Ekenäs IF	2026	Ykkösliiga	13	0	0	0	0	0	13	0
Career total			135	15	12	1	14	0	161	16
