= Ibrahim Köse =

Finnish footballer (born 1992)

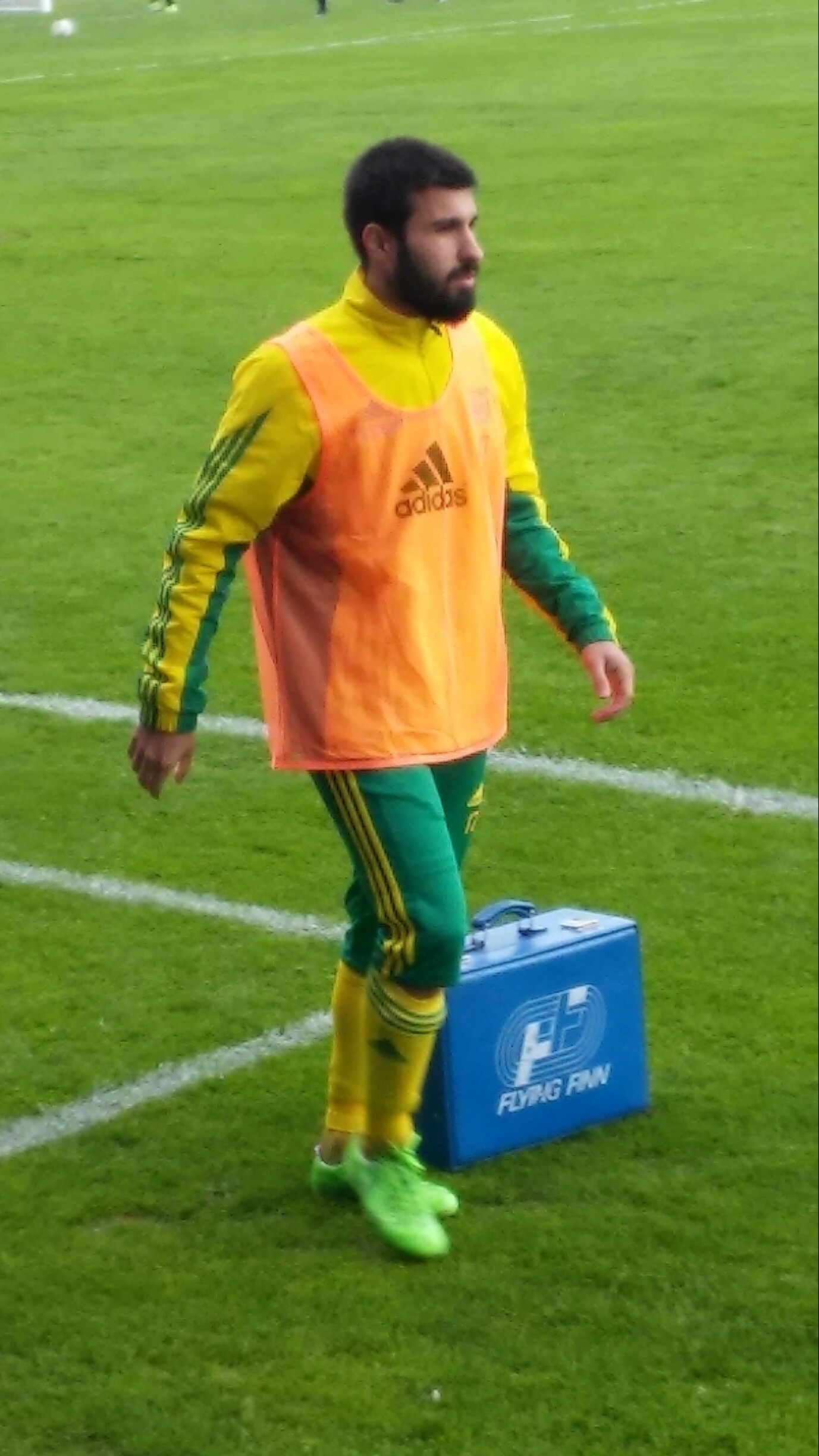

Personal information
- Date of birth: 4 March 1992 (age 34)
- Height: 1.71 m (5 ft 7 in)
- Position: Midfielder

Youth career
- FC Reipas

Senior career*
| Years | Team | Apps | (Gls) |
| 2010–2012 | Lahti | 35 | (2) |
| 2010 | → Hämeenlinna (loan) | 5 | (1) |
| 2013–2016 | Ilves | 40 | (2) |
| 2016 | Kuusysi | 12 | (1) |

International career
- Finland U19
- * Club domestic league appearances and goals

Ibrahim Köse (born 4 March 1992) is a Finnish former professional footballer.

== Personal life ==
Köse is of Turkish descent, and he holds dual citizenship in Finland and Turkey. His younger brothers Onuray and Berat are also footballers.
