= Serkan Günes =

Swedish–Turkish photographer (born 1980)

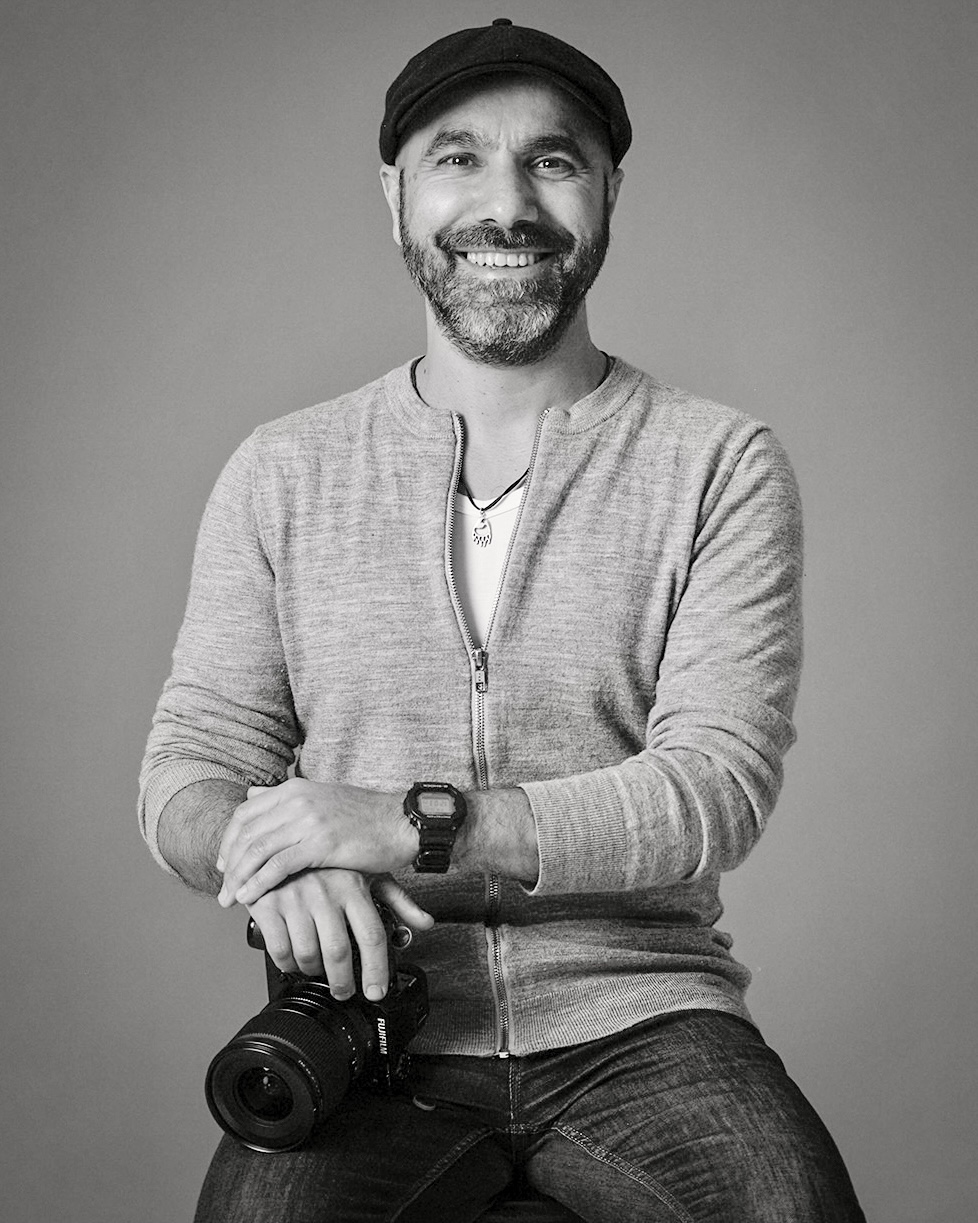
- Born: Serkan Güneş; 16 March 1980 (age 46)
- Occupations: Photographer; Author; Lecturer
- Website: www.serkangunes.com

Serkan Günes (Serkan Güneş, born 16 March 1980, in Istanbul, Turkey) is a Swedish–Turkish photographer best known for his landscape photographs of nature.

Günes was born in Istanbul, Turkey and later emigrated to Sweden at the age of 20. He now lives in Swedish Lapland.

According to Maria Ågren, Director General at Swedish Environmental Protection Agency, Günes "possesses a masters ability to capture the beauty in everyday landscapes, as well as the obvious beauty in the exotic landscapes". Günes works mainly in Scandinavia but also in many different parts of the world including the Arctic, Europe, Africa and Asia. His photographs are published in photo magazines in Europe and Asia.

Serkan Günes is a member of The Association of Swedish Professional Photographers.

== Photographic and artistic philosophy ==
Günes' approach to nature photography combines elements of documentary photography and, mainly, art photography. Serkan Günes early influences was traditional landscape photographers, such as Ansel Adams and Eliot Porter. Nowadays he lists all "good pictures" as inspirational, as he says.

== Bibliography ==
- Stockholm – Sjön, Skogen & Skärgården (2010), Balkong Förlag, ISBN 978-91-85581-36-8
- I huvudet på fotografen Serkan (2013), DEXT Förlag, ISBN 978-91-86841-58-4
- The Land of Eight Seasons (2017), ISBN 978-91-639-2206-0

== Awards ==
- 2006 – Wildlife Photographer of the Year, Eric Hosking Award, by the Natural History Museum in London and BBC Wildlife Magazine
- 2010 – Nature Photographer of the Year 2009, by Swedish Environmental Protection Agency

== Exhibitions ==
- 2019 - "The light of Lapland from above", Fujikina, Tokyo, Japan
- 2017 - "The Land of Eight Seasons", Naturum Laponia Visitor Center, Stora Sjöfallet
- 2016 - "The Land of Eight Seasons", Photokina photo fair, Germany
- 2016 - "Mitt Tyresta", Tyresta National Park Information Centre, Stockholm
- 2015 - "Årstider", Wilderness fair, Stockholm
- 2014 - "Vildmark", Wilderness fair, Stockholm
- 2013 – "Bruno Liljefors och naturfotograferna", Waldermarsudde, Stockholm
- 2012 – "Ljus, ljus och åter ljus", Bollmoradalens kyrka, Church of Sweden, Stockholm
- 2011 – "Chasing the Light", The Swedish Museum of Natural History, Stockholm
- 2008 – "Mitt Afrika", Photo fair, Stockholm
- 2008 – "Nordiskt ljus", Wilderness fair, Stockholm
- 2006 – "Wildlife Photographer of the Year", Natural History Museum, London
