= Brazer Bozlak =

Swedish entrepreneur (born 1989)

- Born: February 25, 1989 (age 37); Sweden
- Citizenship: Swedish
- Education: Architecture (BArch)
- Occupations: Entrepreneur, architect

Brazer Bozlak (born February 25, 1989) is a Swedish entrepreneur, architect, and the founder and CEO of Urban Italian Group, a restaurant group operating the Basta and Florentine brands in Sweden and Spain.

== Early life and education ==
Bozlak was born in Turkey and moved to Sweden as a child. He studied architecture and construction management in the United States, and worked at Skanska USA.

== Career ==
Bozlak started his career in architecture, working at Erdem Architects in 2012 and as a project engineer at Skanska USA from 2015.

In 2017, Bozlak founded Urban Italian Group. The group operates Basta and Florentine restaurants in Sweden.

Bozlak is involved in the interior design and concept development of the group's restaurants.

== Recognition ==
In 2024, Basta in Stockholm was named Europe's Best Rooftop Restaurant at the World Culinary Awards.
