= Turkish Youth Association of Norway =

The Turkish Youth Association of Norway (Norwegian: Norges Tyrkiske Ungdomsforening, Turkish: Norvec Türk Gencleri Dernegi) was founded in 2001 and promotes the cultural, academic and social interests of Norwegian citizens with Turkish origin in Norway. It is a non-profit, politically nonpartisan NGO which seeks to promote equal opportunities, and increase the understanding between the indigenous people and persons of non-Norwegian origin in Norway.

The Turkish Youth Association of Norway promotes cultural diversity in Norway through working for justice and equality.

== Activities ==
The Turkish Youth Association has, through projects and extensive cooperation with other NGOs, built up expertise and experience that is shared with other NGOs and individuals. This includes lectures, guest speaking for and participation in debates and conferences, media and political lobbying for concrete issues, production and dissemination of information.

The Turkish Youth Association has become politically relevant in Norwegian society.
