= Baren (Danish TV series) =

Danish reality show

Baren is the local season of the reality The Bar in Denmark. The show was aired in 2001 and 2002 with 2 seasons in total. TV3 is the channel was aired.

== Season 1 ==
- Start Date: 22 January 2001.
- End Date: 30 April 2001.
- Duration: 99 days.
- Contestants:
  - The Finalists: Erkan (The Winner) & Maria (Runner-up).
  - Evicted Contestants: Betina, Christian*, Henrik, Jan, Jeanette, Marie, Martin, Michael, Mona, Nikolaj, Richard, Rikke & Tonja.
  - Voluntary Exits: Christian* voluntarily exited the show and re-entered shortly afterwards.

=== Contestants ===
Contestant	Residence	Occupation	Age
Betina Skjødt Hansen	Aarhus	Architecture Student	25
Christian Frederik Oxholm Sonne	Vesterbro	Fashion Trade	30
Erkan Kilic	Aarhus	Sales Assistant	27
Henrik Michael Rugaard	Valby		28
Jan Rudbæk Larsen	Odense	Mechanical Engineer	38
Jeanette Buus	Fredericia	Teacher Assistant	25
Maria Sidelmann Sørensen	Aarhus	Social Worker	24
Marie Krustrup	Horsens	Bartender	24
Martin Pedersen	Viborg	Sales Consultant	28
Michael Bøgballe	Östersund, Sweden	Musician	24
Mona Pertho	Copenhagen	Plant Seller	29
Nikolaj Møller	Copenhagen		26
Richard Nielsen	Kolding		27
Rikke Akselbo	Hillerød	Casino Dealer	29
Tonja Rugholm	Aalborg	Economic Student	26

=== Nominations ===
	Round 1	Round 2	Round 3	Round 4	Round 5	Round 6	Round 7	Round 8	Round 9	Round 10	Round 11	Round 12	Round 13	Final	
Erkan	Christian; Rikke	Michael; Mona	Mona; Jeanette	Maria; Jeanette	Maria; Richard	Maria; Marie	Michael; Tonja	Mona; Jeanette	Maria; Michael	Maria; Michael	Nikolaj; Mona	Christian; Maria	Christian; Maria	Winner (Day 99)	
Maria	Betina; Richard	Mona; Jan	Erkan; Marie	Christian; Tonja	Marie; Richard	Nikolaj; Erkan	Mona; Jeanette	Erkan; Nikolaj	Mona; Henrik	Nikolaj; Christian	Mona; Nikolaj	Erkan; Christian	Erkan; Christian	Runner-Up (Day 99)	
Christian	Marie; Rikke	Erkan; Jan	Maria; Jan	Michael; Nikolaj	Richard; Jeanette	Walked (Day ??)			Henrik; Nikolaj	Michael; Nikolaj	Mona; Erkan	Erkan; Maria	Erkan; Maria	Evicted (Day 92)	
Mona	Marie; Betina	Martin; Jan	Tonja; Maria	Maria; Jeanette	Nikolaj; Christian	Tonja; Erkan	Michael; Jeanette	Erkan; Jeanette	Maria; Nikolaj	Erkan; Nikolaj	Christian; Erkan	Maria; Erkan	Evicted (Day 85)		
Nikolaj	Maria; Richard	Mona; Jan	Maria; Martin	Marie; Christian	Michael; Maria	Mona; Erkan	Jeanette; Tonja	Henrik; Jeanette	Erkan; Henrik	Erkan; Michael	Maria; Christian	Evicted (Day 78)			
Michael	Rikke; Tonja	Christian; Jan	Erkan; Jan	Richard; Martin	Erkan; Jeanette	Maria; Erkan	Erkan; Tonja	Mona; Jeanette	Maria; Nikolaj	Christian; Nikolaj	Evicted (Day 71)				
Henrik	Not in The Bar						Michael; Maria	Mona; Nikolaj	Christian; Nikolaj	Evicted (Day 64)					
Jeanette	Erkan; Tonja	Maria; Mona	Christian; Jan	Marie; Nikolaj	Erkan; Richard	Nikolaj; Erkan	Tonja; Erkan	Maria; Michael	Evicted (Day 57)						
Tonja	Erkan; Jeanette	Maria; Jan	Jeanette; Martin	Michael; Maria	Maria; Christian	Nikolaj; Erkan	Mona; Erkan	Evicted (Day 50)							
Marie	Richard; Martin	Mona; Jan	Nikolaj; Jan	Mona; Jeanette	Maria; Tonja	Nikolaj; Erkan	Evicted (Day 43)								
Richard	Marie; Maria	Mona; Jan	Christian; Jan	Michael; Jeanette	Nikolaj; Erkan	Evicted (Day 36)									
Martin	Tonja; Michael	Mona; Jan	Jeanette; Jan	Marie; Maria	Evicted (Day 29)										
Jan	Richard; Rikke	Nikolaj; Tonja	Erkan; Michael	Evicted (Day 22)											
Betina	Christian; Martin	Erkan; Jan	Evicted (Day 13)												
Rikke	Richard; Martin	Evicted (Day 6)													
Plus (+)	Marie (3 votes)	Mona (5 votes)	Erkan (3 votes)	Michael (3 votes)	Maria (3 votes)	Nikolaj (4 votes)	Michael (3 votes)	Mona (3 votes)	Maria (3 votes)	Erkan (2 votes)	Mona (2 votes)	Erkan (2 votes)	Erkan (2 votes)	None	
Minus (-) (1st Nominated)	Martin (3 votes)	Jan (10 votes)	Jan (6 votes)	Jeanette (4 votes)	Richard (3 votes)	Erkan (7 votes)	Tonja (3 votes)	Jeanette (4 votes)	Nikolaj (4 votes)	Nikolaj (3 votes)	Erkan (2 votes)	Maria (2 votes)	Christian; Maria (2 votes)	None	
2nd Nominated (By Plus (+))	Rikke	Betina	Richard	Martin	Jeanette	Marie	Jeanette	Henrik	Henrik	Michael	Nikolaj	Mona	None	None	
Evicted	Rikke; 73.3% to evict	Betina; 51.5% to evict	Jan; 67.6% to evict	Martin; 79.4% to evict	Richard; 51% to evict	Marie; 68.3% to evict	Tonja; 67.8% to evict	Jeanette; 56.6% to evict	Henrik; 57.6% to evict	Michael; 65.6% to evict	Nikolaj; 51.7% to evict	Mona; 64.2% to evict	Christian; 50.1% to evict		
Evicted	Rikke; 73.3% to evict	Betina; 51.5% to evict	Jan; 67.6% to evict	Martin; 79.4% to evict	Richard; 51% to evict	Marie; 68.3% to evict	Tonja; 67.8% to evict	Jeanette; 56.6% to evict	Henrik; 57.6% to evict	Michael; 65.6% to evict	Nikolaj; 51.7% to evict	Mona; 64.2% to evict	Christian; 50.1% to evict	Maria; 45% to win	Erkan; 55% to win

== Season 2 ==
- Name: Baren 2002
- Start Date: 17 January 2002
- End Date: 11 April 2002
- Duration: 85 days
- Contestants:
  - The Finalists: Noel (The Winner), Thomas H (Runner-up), Carsten & Jeanett
  - Evicted Contestants: Anja, Bernhard, Carina, Christian, Heidi, Henrik, Maria, Phuong, Rene, Rikke, Tenna & Thomas B.

=== Contestants ===
Contestant	Residence	Occupation	Age
Anja Maria Nielsen	Vanløse		22
Martin August Pedersen, "Bernhard"	Eskilstrup	Student	23
Ann-Carina Suyono	Nørrebro	Sales Assistant	22
Carsten Reinholdt	Aarhus		28
Christian Loving	Esbjerg		25
Heidi Frederikke Jørgensen	Aarhus	Social Worker	25
Henrik Juhl Jørgensen	Odense	Student	25
Jeanett A. D. Pedersen	Viborg	Fitness Instructor	24
Maria Dahl Nielsen	Aalborg	Waiter/Bartender	26
Noel Johansen	Nørrebro	Law Student	25
Phuong Nguyen	Vejle	Unemployed	26
René Sundahl	Kolding		25
Rikke Rud Sørensen	Nyboder	Social & Healthcare Assistant	26
Tenna W. Peckham	Nørrebro	Nail Technician	27
Thomas Bahnsen	Kokkedal		24
Thomas Høgsted	Brovst	Music Producer/DJ	24

=== Nominations ===
This season the nomination rules changed. There were no plus/minus voting. Instead each contestant had to nominate 1 other contestant for eviction.

The contestant with the most nominations would face the public vote alone. The public then voted on if the contestant should be evicted or not.

If the vote was to evict then the contestant was evicted. If the vote was to stay then the contestant would choose the contestant to be evicted.

	Round 1	Round 2	Round 3	Round 4	Round 5	Round 6	Round 7	Round 8	Round 9	Round 10	Special	Round 11	Round 12	Round 13	Final	
Noel	Henrik	Tenna	Thomas B	Rene	Phuong; Rene	Anja (x2)	Tenna	Bernhard	Carsten	Immune	Jeanett; Christian	Carsten	Thomas H	Tenna (x2)	Winner (Day 85)	
Thomas H	Henrik	Henrik	Bernhard	Henrik	Anja	Anja (x2)	Anja	No; Nominate	Carsten	Immune	Jeanett; Thomas B	Carsten	Carina	Noel; Tenna	Runner-Up (Day 85)	
Carsten	Not in The Bar							Bernhard	Bernhard	Immune	Jeanett; Christian	Thomas H	Thomas H	Jeanett (x2)	3rd/4th Place (Day 85)	
Jeanett	Henrik	Evicted (Day 1)										Immune	Noel	Tenna	3rd/4th Place (Day 85)	
Tenna	Not in The Bar	Rene	Bernhard	Henrik	No; Nominate	Rene (x2)	No; Nominate	Immune	Immune	Anja	Jeanett; Christian	Carsten	Carsten	Jeanett	Evicted (Day 78)	
Carina	Not in The Bar							Immune	Immune	Anja	Phuong; Heidi	Thomas H	Thomas H	Evicted (Day 71)		
Anja	Henrik	-	Heidi	Thomas B	Thomas H	Rene (x2)	Christian	Immune	Immune	Phuong	Maria; Jeanett	Carsten	Evicted (Day 64)			
Phuong	Rikke	Anja	Thomas B	Thomas B	Henrik	Noel; Rene	Thomas H	Immune	Immune	Anja	Evicted (Day 57)					
Bernhard	Thomas H	Rikke	Tenna	No; Nominate	Anja	Noel; Rene	Heidi	Carsten	Carsten	Evicted (Day 50)						
Heidi	Rikke	Rene	Henrik	Thomas B	Rene	Rene (x2)	Noel	Immune	Evicted (Day 43)							
Christian	Rikke	Anja	Maria	Thomas B	Henrik	Anja (x2)	Anja	Evicted (Day 36)								
Rene	Rikke	Rikke	Tenna	Thomas B	Henrik	Anja (x2)	Evicted (Day 33)									
Henrik	Rikke	Rikke	Anja	Heidi	Christian	Evicted (Day 29)										
Thomas B	Rene	-	Noel	Rene	Evicted (Day 22)											
Maria	Christian	Phuong	Bernhard	Evicted (Day 15)												
Rikke	Jeanett	Bernhard	Evicted (Day 8)													
Nominated	Rikke (5 votes)	Rikke (3 votes)	Bernhard (3 votes)	Thomas B (5 votes)	Henrik (3 votes)	Rene (2/6 votes)	Anja (2 votes)	Bernhard (2 votes)	Carsten (3 votes)	Anja (3 votes)	Bernhard; Christian; Henrik; Heidi; Jeanett; Maria; Phuong; Rene; Rikke; Thomas B	Carsten (4 votes)	Thomas H (3 votes)	Tenna (2/2 votes)	None	
Stay/Evict Returning	Stay; 52%	Evict; 63%	Stay; 54%	Evict; 68%	Evict; 61%	None	Stay; 58%	Stay; 52%	Stay; 51%	Stay; 68%	Jeanett; 5 votes Returning	Stay; 68%	Stay; 73%	Evict; 56%	None	
Evicted by Salved	Jeanett	None	Maria	None	None	None	Christian	Heidi	Bernhard	Phuong	-	Anja	Carina	None	None	
Evicted	Jeanett; By Salved	Rikke; By Public	Maria; By Salved	Thomas B By Public	Henrik; By Public	Rene; By Contestants	Christian; By Salved	Heidi; By Salved	Bernhard; By Salved	Phuong; By Salved	Jeanett; By Contestants	Anja; By Salved	Carina; By Salved	Tenna; By Public	Jeanett ?% to won (Out of 4)	Carsten ?% to won (Out of 4)
Evicted	Jeanett; By Salved	Rikke; By Public	Maria; By Salved	Thomas B By Public	Henrik; By Public	Rene; By Contestants	Christian; By Salved	Heidi; By Salved	Bernhard; By Salved	Phuong; By Salved	Jeanett; By Contestants	Anja; By Salved	Carina; By Salved	Tenna; By Public	Thomas H 42% to won	Noel; 58% to won
