= Norwegian statistics by ethnic group =

The following selected statistics about ethnic groups living in Norway have been extracted from the results of the Norwegian census.

== Average income for couples with children ==
=== Listed in Norwegian kroner ===
Rank	Origin	Income
1	Norway	547000
2	Sweden	483000
3	India	399000
4	Vietnam	387000
5	Chile	383000
6	Sri Lanka	381000
7	Bosnia and Herzegovina	369000
8	Pakistan	328000
9	Iran	325000
10	Serbia, North Macedonia and Croatia	321000
11	Somalia	317000
12	Turkey	305000

== Home ownership percentage ==
Rank	Origin	Percentages
1	Sri Lanka	79.5
2	Norway	79.0
3	India	74.7
4	Vietnam	60.2
5	Iran	52.4
6	Iraq	23.4

== Percentages that have been given penalty from Norwegian court ==
Rank	Origin	Percent
1	Gambia	7.04
2	Iraq	5.15
3	Somalia	5.15
4	Morocco	4.97
5	Iran	4.38
6	Lebanon	4.16
7	Serbia	4.12
8	Eritrea	4.02
9	North Macedonia	3.96
10	Chile	3.94
11	Pakistan	3.67
12	Turkey	3.38
13	Vietnam	3.20
15	Sri Lanka	1.92
17	Thailand	1.50
18	Norway	1.35
19	Philippines	0.93

== Percentage of people under 67 unable to earn for a living ==
Rank	Origin	Percent
1	Pakistan	13.0
2	Turkey	11.4
3	India	9.8
4	Norway	9.6
5	Philippines	3.7
6	China	2.2
7	Somalia	1.7

== Higher Education Ages from 19-24 ==
Rank	Origin	Percent
1	Sri Lanka	48.7
2	Germany	37.8
3	Vietnam	37.1
4	Poland	36.4
5	India	33.0
6	Norway	26.0

== Employees by immigrant groups ==
=== listed in percentage for all ages ===
Rank	Origin	Percent
1	Sri Lanka	61.1
2	Norway	60.8
3	Chile	60.7
4	Philippines	59.5
5	China	58.7
6	India	56.4
7	Vietnam	58.3
8	Bosnia and Herzegovina	54.1
9	Russia	52.1
10	Iran	43.9
11	Turkey	43.7
12	Pakistan	38.3
13	Somalia	29.0
14	Afghanistan	28.0

== Number of reported sick ==
=== listed in percentage days of valid sick report given from doctor ===
Rank	Origin	Percent
1	China	4.5
2	Norway	6.9
3	Turkey	13.5
4	Pakistan	14.2
