= Eerikin Pippuri =

Finnish restaurant chain

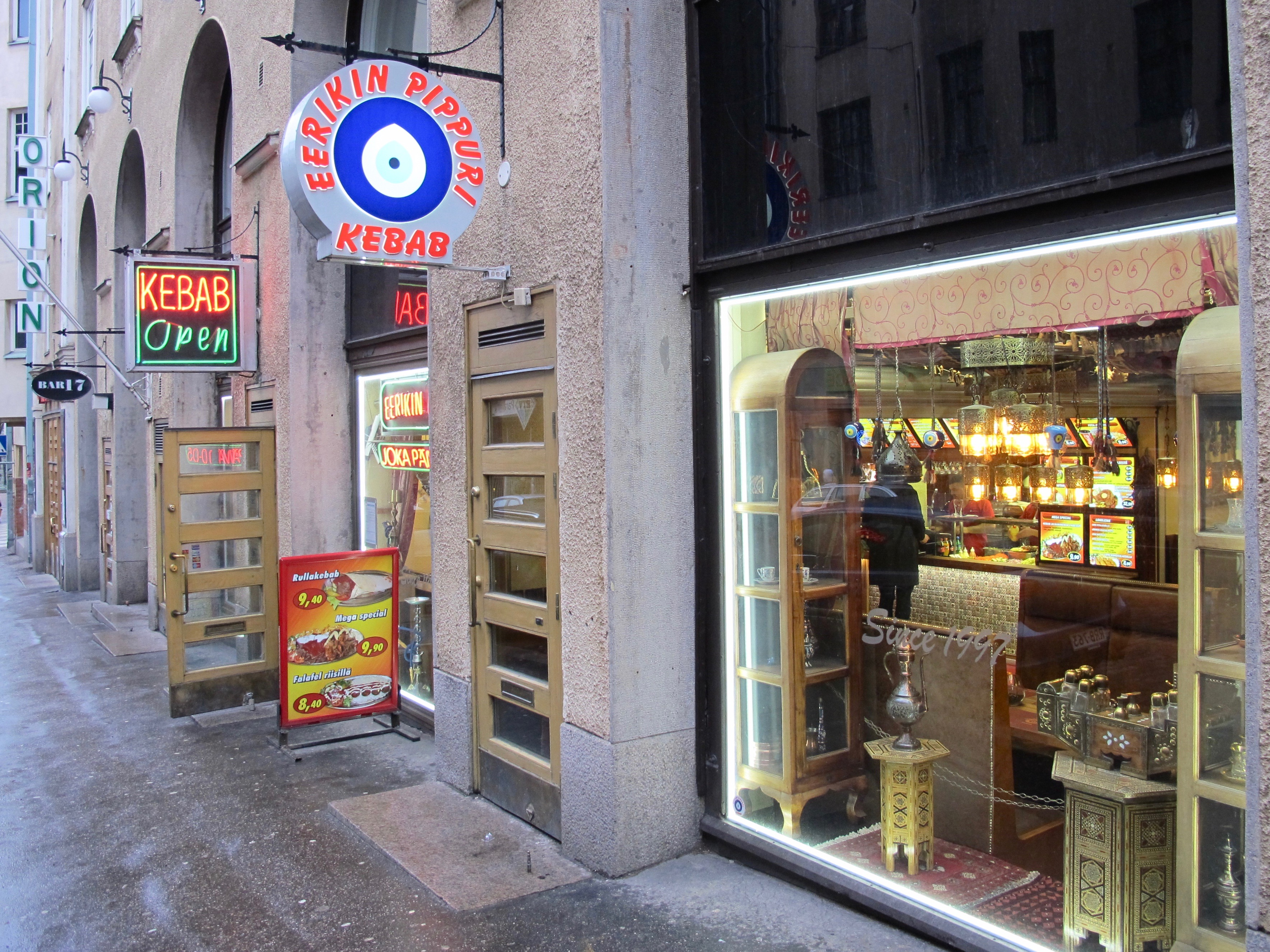
The original Eerikin Pippuri restaurant in January 2018.

Eerikin Pippuri is a Finnish fast food chain founded in 1997, serving Middle Eastern cuisine. The chain, which serves kebab, pita bread, falafel and salads has six restaurants, of which four are located in Helsinki, one in Vantaa and one in Tampere. The chain is operated by the company Harman Foods OY, whose CEO is the Turkish immigrant Cetin Harman.

The interiors of the restaurants are decorated in a Turkish style including oriental rugs. In 2014 Eerikin Pippuri was chosen one of the best "night food" restaurants in Helsinki in a survey conducted by City magazine.

== Restaurants ==
The first restaurant was opened in autumn 1997 at Eerikinkatu 17 in Helsinki, which led to the name. Reasons for the success of the original Eerikinkatu restaurant included long opening times, and the restaurant was expanded to the neighbouring premises in 2006.

The next two restaurants were opened at the Forum shopping centre in 2008 and 2015. The chain was further expanded in November 2017 when the fourth restaurant was opened at the Ruoholahti shopping centre. The two newest restaurants were opened in 2018 at the shopping centre Myyrmanni in Vantaa and at the shopping centre Ratina in Tampere. Today, the only two remaining restaurants are the original restaurant on Eerikinkatu and the restaurant at Myyrmanni in Vantaa.
