= Erkan Inan =

Free agent
- Position: Shooting guard / point guard

Personal information
- Born: 7 November 1989 (age 37) Sundbyberg, Sweden
- Listed height: 192 cm (6 ft 4 in)
- Listed weight: 87 kg (192 lb)

Career information
- Playing career: 2007–present

Career history
- 2007–2008: Solna Vikings
- 2008–2009: Genç Banvitliler
- 2009–2010: Banvit
- 2010–2011: TTNet Beykoz
- 2011–2012: Trabzonspor
- 2012: Genç Telekom
- 2012–2013: 08 Stockholm
- 2013–2014: Solna Vikings
- 2015–2024: AIK

Career highlights
- Basketligan champion (2008)

Erkan Inan (born 7 November 1989) is a Swedish-Turkish professional basketball player who last played for the Solna Vikings of the Swedish Basketligan. He has also previously played in the Turkish Basketball League and the Turkish Basketball Second League.

== Professional career ==
Inan began his professional career with the Solna Vikings in 2007–08 as he averaged 0.5 points in 12 games as a rookie. The Vikings went on to win the 2008 Basketligan championship.

In 2008, Inan moved to Turkey and signed with Genç Banvitliler where he averaged 4.4 points and 1.9 rebounds in 22 games in 2008–09. He started the 2009–10 season with Banvitliler as well but in December 2009, he left the club and joined Banvit B.K. where he played out the rest of the season.

In 2010, Inan signed with TTNet Beykoz for the 2010–11 season where he had a career-best year with averages of 15.9 points, 4.2 rebounds, 2.5 assists and 1.5 steals in 17 games.

In August 2011, Inan signed with Trabzonspor for the 2011–12 season. In January 2012, he left Trabzonspor and signed with Genç Telekom for the rest of the season.

Following the death of his father in April 2012, Inan returned to Sweden and signed with 08 Stockholm for the 2012–13 season. However, an injury sustained in December 2012 ruled him out for the rest of the season. In 14 games, he averaged 11.6 points, 4.0 rebounds and 2.9 assists per game.

On August 17, 2013, Inan signed with the Solna Vikings for the 2013–14 season, returning to the club for a second stint.

== Personal ==
Inan's father, Mehmet, died in April 2012 after a long battle with cancer. His brother, Serkan, is also a professional basketball player; the two played alongside each other with the Solna Vikings in 2013–14.
