= Mehmet Ali Avci =

Danish filmmaker

- Born: Mehmet Ali Avci; 2 September; Copenhagen, Denmark

Mehmet Ali Avci, is a Danish film maker, known for the 2018 short film Ansvar.

== Early life ==
Mehmet was born and raised in the suburbs of Copenhagen, Denmark. His father site of the family originates from Turkey, and he would often visit his Turkish family. During these visits he would often watch movies on the family's old VHS. Movies became his way of escaping the boring life in the suburbs.

== Film career ==
In 2016 Mehmet started attending the film school Station Next, where he would go on to write and direct multiple short films, the most notable being Ansvar, which would go on to attend multiple international film festivals.
