= Tülin Şahin =

Danish-Turkish top model, television presenter, author and actress

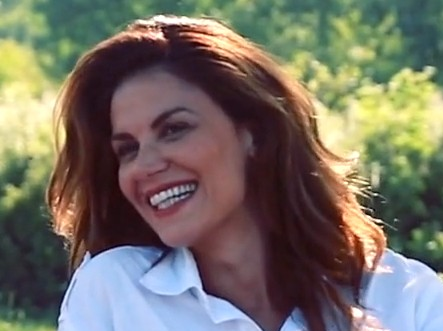
- Şahin in 2013
- Born: 13 December 1979 (age 46); Odense, Denmark
- Years active: 1996–present
- Spouses: Mehmet Özer (m. 2005; div. 2017) Pedro de Noronha (m. 2019; sep. 2020)
- Children: 1
- Modeling information
- Height: 1.75 m (5 ft 9 in)
- Hair color: Brunette
- Eye color: Brown

Tülin Şahin (born 13 December 1979) is a Danish-Turkish top model, television presenter, author, and actress.

== Life and career ==
Şahin was born in Odense, Denmark, and spent her childhood there. She was discovered in a shopping mall and went to do professional modeling career in Paris in 1998. She came to Turkey, the birthplace of her parents to work for Zeki Triko. Şahin was dubbed as 'Sivaslı Cindy' or 'Cindy from Sivas' because of her close resemblance to Cindy Crawford (she has also her same mole) and Sivas being her hometown.

She had also done charity and philanthropic work with her former husband Mehmet Özer. She later established the website tuliss.com for women.
