= Sermin Özürküt =

Turkish-Swedish political figure (born 1949)

Sermin Özürküt (born 19 December 1949) is a Turkish-Swedish political figure who served in Swedish Parliament, the Riksdag, from 2002 to 2006.

She is a journalist by profession and competed for her electoral seat in Stockholm County as a member of the Left Party. During her service in the Riksdag she was a Deputy Member of Committee on Housing, Committee on Foreign Affairs, Committee on EU Affairs and was also a member of the delegation to the Organization for Security and Co-operation in Europe and a member of the Swedish Inter-parliamentary group.
