= Şerif Yenen =

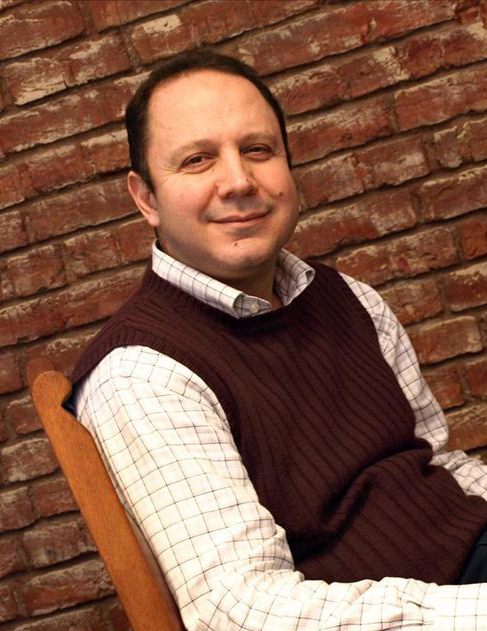
- Born: May 17, 1963 (age 63); Ödemiş, İzmir, Turkey
- Education: University of Istanbul
- Occupations: Travel specialist; Tour guide; Travel writer; Film-maker; Lecturer
- Known for: Turkish Odyssey
- Website: www.serifyenen.com

Şerif Yenen (born 17 May 1963) is a Turkish travel specialist, tour guide, travel writer, film-maker, international keynote speaker and lecturer. He wrote Turkish Odyssey in English, the “first guidebook of Turkey ever written by a Turk”. His latest work, published in 2025, is a comprehensive, revised, and expanded three-volume edition of his original guidebook, Turkish Odyssey.

Yenen gives lectures about travel and Turkish history and culture, the majority of which are in academic communities. His guidebooks are used as textbooks or are on suggested reading lists at various universities, and his articles and columns are published in international magazines and national newspapers.

== Biography ==
=== Early life and education ===
Şerif Yenen was born into a middle-class family in the town of Ödemiş near İzmir in 1963. After completing middle school in Ödemiş, when he was fourteen, he passed the entrance exams and became a military student at the Kuleli Military High School in Istanbul, where the instruction was mainly in English. After high school he was accepted in the Department of English Literature and Linguistics at the University of Istanbul as a military student. After graduation from the university in 1985, he became an officer in the Turkish Armed Forces, and taught English as a second language for four years at the Maltepe Military High School in İzmir. He left the Army in 1989 and attended tourist guide training programs offered by the Ministry of Tourism of Turkey and became qualified as a national tourist guide.

== Career ==
While working as a tourist guide, he published his guidebook, Turkish Odyssey in English (turkishodyssey.com), in 1997. The content and the design of his website gained attention in the media and won numerous awards. He published the multimedia version of the same work as a CD-ROM in 2001. In 2022, an updated edition of the Turkish version, Anadolu Destanı, was published by a local publisher. In 2025, Yenen released a comprehensive, revised, and expanded three-volume edition of Turkish Odyssey, available in both print and e-book formats.

Yenen has held elected positions on the boards of various organizations in the tourism sector:

- President of the Istanbul Tourist Guides' Guild (IRO) 2002-2015
- President of the Federation of Turkish Tourist Guide Associations (TUREB) 2002 - 2013
- President of the Tourist Guides Foundation (TUREV), 2002 – 2009
- Executive board member of the World Federation of Tourist Guide Associations (WFTGA), and editor-in-chief of the Guidelines Internetion@l magazine, 2003 – 2007
- Vice President of Turkish Travel Agencies and Tourist Guides Assembly, established as a tourism council within TOBB (The Union of Chambers and Commodity Exchanges of Turkey) 2006 - 2013.
- Member of the Consultative Committee for Istanbul 2010 Cultural Capital of Europe

Yenen regularly wrote a weekly column in the Mediterranean supplement of the Turkish newspaper Akşam between 2006 and 2009 under the heading A Tourist Guide’s Perspective.

Şerif Yenen, who has been attracting media attention for his endeavors as the chairman of IRO and TUREB to make sure that the occupational bill of law for the tourist guides of Turkey is passed by the parliament, played a decisive role in 2012 during the process of drawing up and passage of the law, which had been much anticipated by the tourist guides for the past 40 years. As a result of his endeavors, the occupational law was promulgated in the Official Gazette and entered into force on June 22, 2012. Thus, tourist guiding was defined as a profession in Turkey.

He has given private guide services to celebrities and statesmen, among whom are Pope Benedict XVI, Oprah Winfrey, Princess Michael of Kent, and Lester Holt of the Today Show.

Yenen's second guidebook was the 488-page Quick Guide Istanbul, followed by the "Istanbul", "Culture" and "Turkey" series of his Quick Guide Pamphlets. He produced a travel documentary film on Istanbul in 2014: Istanbul Unveiled. Şerif Yenen gives lessons on Anatolian Civilizations and the Cultural Heritage of Turkey at the Bilgi and Boğaziçi Universities as a part-time instructor. He is also an international speaker who regularly gives presentations at institutions abroad, notably the Smithsonian Institution. In addition to his positions at various tourism organizations, he is consulted on TV programs and juries.

== Awards ==
Year	Organisation	Award
2021	International Rotary 2420 Regional Federation	Rotary Award for Excellence in Service to Humanity
2014	Skål International	Turkey’s Promotion Award
2012	Skål International	Special Award
2012	Young Tourism Institution	Tourism Enrichment Award
2006	Skål International	Quality in Tourism
1998	Dost.net	Best design:Turkish Odyssey by Şerif Yenen
1998	Webidol	Second place

== Publications ==
- Turkish Odyssey: A Cultural Guide to Türkiye (3-volume set, English), 2025, ISBN 978-605-74625-7-2
- Kariye/Chora: A Transformation Story from Church to Mosque (English and Turkish), 2024, ISBN 978-625-99827-5-5
- Anadolu Destanı: Türkiye’nin Kültür Mirası ve Gezi Rehberi (Turkish), 2022, ISBN 978-625-449-597-7
- Cultural Selections - Turkey's Top 5, ISBN 978-605-4541-20-1
- Byzantine Highlights in İstanbul, ISBN 978-605-4541-18-8
- Ottoman Highlights in İstanbul, ISBN 978-605-4541-17-1
- En İyi 10 İstanbul, ISBN 978-605-87-8086-6
- Top 10 Places in İstanbul, ISBN 978-605-87-8083-5
- Seyahat İpuçları (Travel Tips), ISBN 978-975-01-7201-4
- Profesyonel Turist Rehberinin El Kitabı (Handbook for Tourist Guides), ISBN 975-01-7200-0
- Quick Guide Istanbul (English), ISBN 978-975-94638-8-5
- Die Türkische Odyssee, Ein Kulturreiseführer für die Türkei (German), ISBN 978-975-96953-2-3
- In Turchia, Un Viaggio nella Cultura Anatolica (Italian), ISBN 975-96953-1-6
- Anadolu Destanı, Türkiye Gezi Rehberi (Turkish, 1st ed.), ISBN 978-975-94638-1-6
- Turkish Odyssey, A Cultural Guide to Turkey with CD-ROM (English), ISBN 975-96953-3-2
- Turkish Odyssey CD-ROM, ISBN 975-96953-0-8
- Turkish Odyssey, A Cultural Guide to Turkey (English, 1st ed.), ISBN 978-975-94638-0-9
