= Henning Munk Jensen =

Danish footballer (1947–2023)

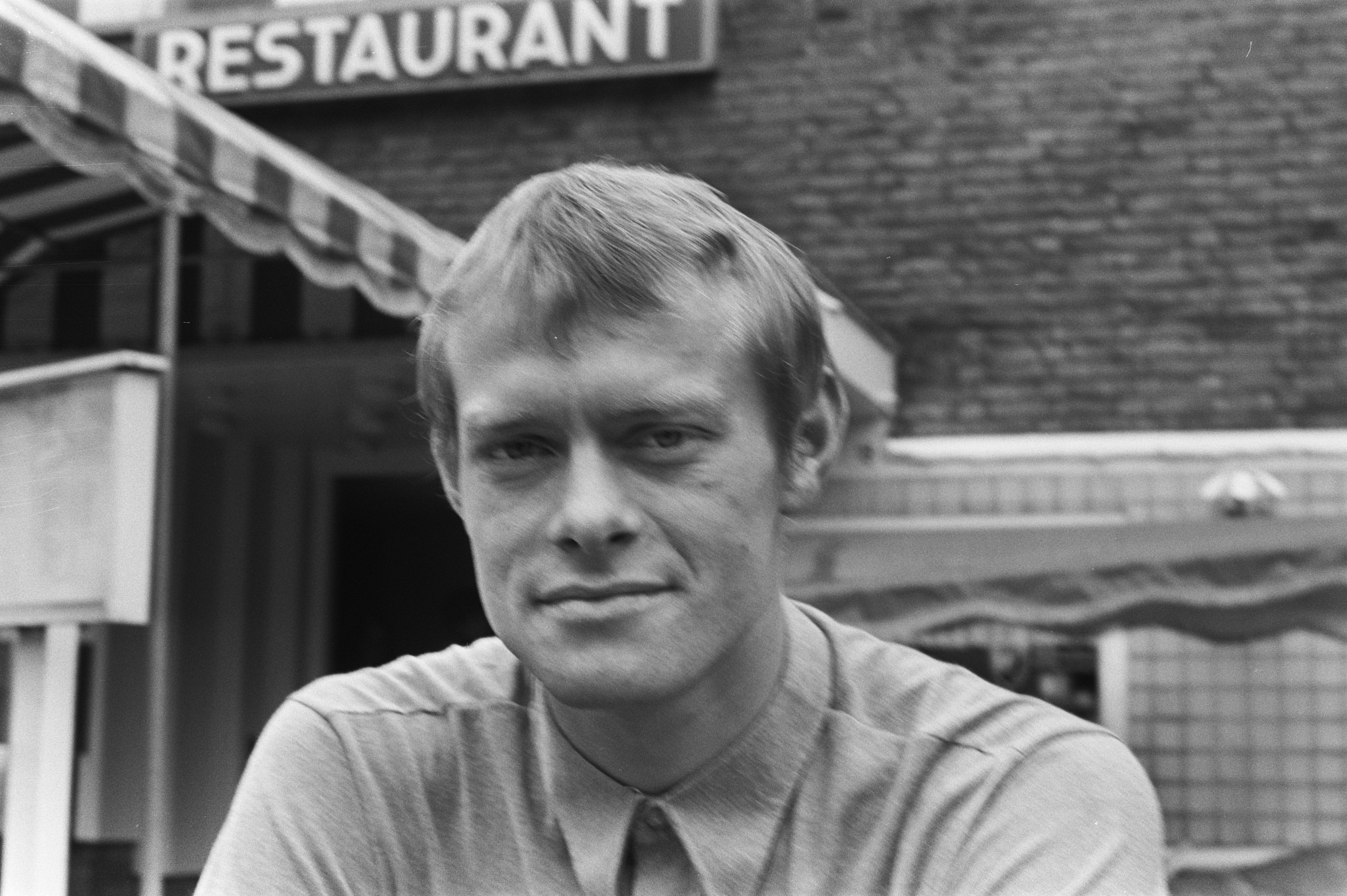
- Munk Jensen in 1970

Personal information
- Date of birth: 12 January 1947
- Place of birth: Tønder, Denmark
- Date of death: 17 November 2023 (aged 76)
- Position: Defender

Youth career
- 1957: Aalborg Chang
- 1958–1961: Aalborg FC
- 1961–1965: AaB

Senior career*
Years	Team	Apps	(Gls)
1965–1970	AaB		
1970–1973	PSV Eindhoven	52	(4)
1973–1977	AaB		
1978	Frederikshavn fI	35	(?)
1979	Edmonton Drillers	12	(0)
1979	SJ Earthquakes	11	(0)
1979	AaB		
1980	Aalborg Freja		
1981	AaB		

International career
1964–1965	Denmark U19	8	(0)
1966	Denmark U21	2	(0)
1966–1978	Denmark	62	(1)
- * Club domestic league appearances and goals

Henning Munk Jensen (12 January 1947 – 17 November 2023) was a Danish footballer who played as a defender. He most prominently played professionally for Dutch team PSV Eindhoven, as well as 392 games for AaB in Denmark during the 1960s. He was named 1968 and 1975 Danish Football Player of the Year, and played a record-setting 62 matches for the Denmark national team from 1966 to 1978, 24 of these as team captain.

He was the brother-in-law of Danish international Allan Michaelsen, and thus the uncle of Danish international Jan Michaelsen.

== Club career ==
Munk Jensen started his career in the youth teams of Aalborg clubs Aalborg Chang and Aalborg FC, before moving to Aalborg BK (AaB). He started his footballing career as a right winger, but eventually settled as a tall, strong, and fast central defender. He made his senior debut in 1965, and got his national breakthrough in AaB's games against English team Everton in the 1966–67 European Cup Winners' Cup. He was injured when AaB won the 1966 Danish Cup, but was on the losing end when AaB lost the 1967 final. He missed AaB's victorious 1970 Danish Cup final through suspension.

In 1970, he moved abroad to play professionally with Dutch club PSV Eindhoven, having been recommended to the club by Danish international and PSV player Bent Schmidt Hansen. He stayed with PSV for three seasons, before moving back to rejoin AaB in 1973. When AaB introduced professional wages, the management planned to pay all players the same amount, which prompted Munk Jensen and goalkeeper Karsten Simensen to leave the club. In early 1978, he moved from AaB to nearby team Frederikshavn fI in the Danish 2nd Division. He moved abroad once more to play for North American clubs Edmonton Drillers and San Jose Earthquakes in 1979. He returned to AaB in 1979, played a single year with Aalborg Freja in the 3rd Division, before he ended his career with AaB in the 2nd Division in 1981. He set an AaB club record with a total 392 games, a record which was eventually broken by Torben Boye.

== International career ==
Munk Jensen made his international debut with the Denmark U19 national team in June 1964, and played eight under-19 games until July 1965. He also played two games for the Denmark U21 in 1966. In November 1966, he made his debut with the senior national team under manager Poul Petersen. He did not play his second international match until June 1968, but then established himself in the starting line-up, and was named 1968 Danish Football Player of the Year. He played a further 22 games for Denmark until June 1970. When he signed a professional contract with PSV, he was prohibited from representing the amateur-only national team.

After the rule of amateurism was abolished in 1971, Munk Jensen re-entered the Danish team in June 1972, and played a further four games that year. Not until he returned for his second stint with AaB, did he re-capture his place in the Danish starting line-up. He played his 28th game for Denmark in September 1974, and was appointed national team captain in September 1975. He was named 1975 Danish Football Player of the Year, the first player to win the award twice, and captained Denmark in 24 of his last 28 national team games. He played full-time in all but one of his national team games, as he was substituted off the pitch in his 50th game, having played awfully in a 2–1 defeat to Poland. In May 1978, he broke Bent Hansen's record of 58 games for Denmark. He ended his international career in September 1978, having played a Danish record 62 international games. The record was broken by Per Røntved in August 1981.

== Death ==
Munk Jensen died on 17 November 2023, at the age of 76.

== Honours ==
Individual

- Danish Football Player of the Year: 1968, 1975
