= Robinson Ekspeditionen 2026 =

- Season 27
- Presented by: Jakob Kjeldbjerg
- No. of days: 40
- No. of castaways: 20
- Location: Langkawi, Malaysia

Release
- Original network: TV3
- Original release: August 24, 2026 – present

Season chronology
- ← Previous; 2025

Robinson Ekspeditionen 2026 is the twenty-seventh season of the Danish reality television series Robinson Ekspeditionen. 20 contestants from Denmark compete in tribes against each other in challenges to make it to the end where after 40 days, they have a chance to win the grand prize of 500,000kr.. The season is hosted once again by Jakob Kjeldbjerg and premieres on 24 August 2026 on TV3.

== Contestants ==
Notable cast members includes Emma Aastrand Jørgensen, Olympic Medalist in sprint kayaking. Heidi Angelo Frikke, partner of Vild med dans dancer Michael Olesen, Kris Kachchad, husband of 2022 contestant Vicky Due. Lis Katz Krefeld, wife of crime writer Michael Katz Krefeld. Viola Dahl, partner of Youtuber and Forræder contestant, Jeppe Ølgaard and William Vedel Kristensen, former contestant on X Factor 2017 and half of the pop duo VKation.

List of Robinson Ekspeditionen 2026 contestants
Contestant	Original Tribe	Swapped Tribe	Second Swapped Tribe	Third Swapped Tribe	Switched Tribe	Merged Tribe	Voted Out
Heidi Angelo Frikke; 51, Esbjerg	South Team	North Team					1st Voted Out; Day 6
Sarah Josephine Holmquist; 34, Kastrup	South Team	North Team	North Team				Lost Duel; Day 8
Lis Katz Krefeld; 55, Indre By	North Team	North Team	North Team	South Team			2nd Voted Out; Day 11
Jannick Barresø Weidemann; 34, Virum	South Team	South Team	South Team	South Team			Medically evacuated Day 13
Kris Kachchad; 44, Køge	North Team	South Team	South Team	South Team			Quit due to Injury; Day 13
Anita Haupt Holm; 42, Lejre	South Team	South Team	South Team	South Team			Quit due to Injury; Day 13
William Vedel Kristensen; 26, Østerbro	South Team	South Team	South Team	South Team			Quit due to Injury; Day 13
Jonas Reinwald Sørensen; 31, Nørrebro	North Team	North Team	South Team	South Team			3rd Voted Out; Day 15
Steffen Blokvig Berg; 24, Viborg	North Team	North Team	North Team	North Team	South Team		4th Voted Out; Day 18
Youssef Mohammed; 44, Kalundborg	North Team	North Team	North Team	North Team	North Team		Medically evacuated Day 21
Christina Damm Hamann; 36, Brøndby Strand	South Team	South Team	South Team	South Team	North Team		5th Voted Out; Day 22
Una Engholm Plesner; 25, Skive	North Team	North Team	North Team	North Team	North Team	Robinson	6th Voted Out; Day 26
David Munis Zepernick; 52, Frederiksberg	North Team	North Team	North Team	North Team	North Team	Robinson	Lost Duel; Day 29
Sanshiro Frederik Komatsu Kræmmer; 23, Frederiksberg	South Team	South Team	South Team	South Team	North Team	Robinson	7th Voted Out; Day 31
Melanie Kjærbøl; 24, Roskilde	South Team	South Team	North Team	North Team	South Team	Robinson	8th Voted Out; Day 35
Alexandra Mosholt Søgaard; 31, Kongens Lyngby	South Team	South Team	South Team	South Team	South Team	Robinson	
Emma Aastrand Jørgensen; 30, Bagsværd	North Team	North Team	North Team	North Team	South Team	Robinson	
Peter "Pete" Larsen; 36, Hollywood, United States	South Team	South Team	South Team	South Team	South Team	Robinson	
Thomas Pap Goltermann; 47, Fredericia	North Team	North Team	North Team	North Team	North Team	Robinson	
Viola Dahl; 26, Dragør	North Team	North Team	North Team	North Team	South Team	Robinson	

== Season summary ==
Episode	Air date	Challenges		Eliminated	Vote	Finish
Episode	Air date	Reward	Immunity	Eliminated	Vote	Finish
Episode 1	24 August 2026	North Team				
Episode 2	31 August 2026	North Team	South Team	Heidi	9-1	1st Voted Out; Day 6
Episode 3	7 September 2026	North Team	South Team	Emma	?-?	Sent to Duel; Day 8
Episode 3	7 September 2026	North Team	South Team	Sarah	?-?	Sent to Duel; Day 8
Episode 3	7 September 2026	North Team	South Team	Sarah	Duel	Lost Duel; Day 8
Episode 4	14 September 2026	North Team (Note: North Team voluntarily shared half the reward with the losing South Team.)	North Team	Lis	9-1	2nd Voted Out; Day 11
Episode 5	21 September 2026	North Team	North Team	Jannick	None	Medically evacuated Day 13
Episode 5	21 September 2026	North Team	North Team	Kris	None	Quit due to Injury; Day 13
Episode 5	21 September 2026	North Team	North Team	Anita	None	Quit due to Injury; Day 13
Episode 5	21 September 2026	North Team	North Team	William	None	Quit due to Injury; Day 13
Episode 6	28 September 2026	(Note: The Challenges occurred in the previous episode.)		Jonas	4-1	3rd Voted Out; Day 15
Episode 7	5 October 2026					4th Voted Out; Day TBD

== Voting History ==
#	Original Tribes
Episode	2
Day	4
Voted out	Heidi
Votes	9-1
Voter	Vote
Alexandra	
Anita	
Christina	
David	
Emma	
Heidi	
Jannick	
Jonas	
Kris	
Lis	
Melanie	
Pete	
Sanshiro	
Sarah	
Steffen	
Thomas	
Una	
Viola	
William	
Youssef	
