= Martin Albrechtsen =

Danish footballer (born 1980)

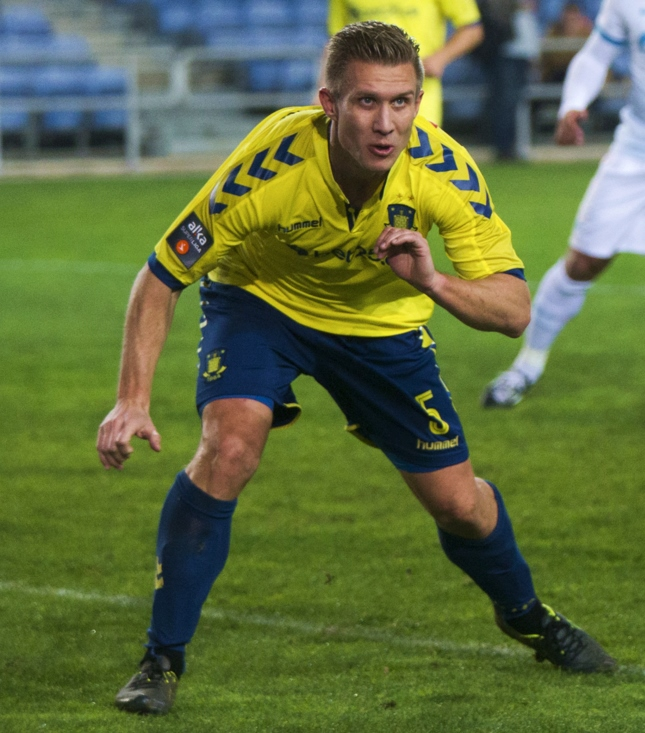
- Albrechtsen playing for Brøndby IF in 2016

Personal information
- Full name: Martin Albrechtsen
- Date of birth: 31 March 1980 (age 46)
- Place of birth: Værløse, Denmark
- Height: 1.88 m (6 ft 2 in)
- Position: Centre-back

Team information
- Current team: Prespa

Senior career*
Years	Team	Apps	(Gls)
1998–2002	AB	89	(3)
2002–2004	Copenhagen	72	(0)
2004–2008	West Bromwich Albion	118	(4)
2008–2009	Derby County	35	(2)
2009–2012	Midtjylland	54	(3)
2012–2017	Brøndby	81	(3)
2017	Horsens	2	(0)
2017–2018	Avarta	12	(0)
2018–2020	VB 1968		
2020–2021	Græsrødderne		
2021–2022	VB 1968		
2023	Fremad Valby		
2023–	Prespa		
Total		463	(15)

International career
1997–1999	Denmark U19	12	(0)
2000–2002	Denmark U21	14	(2)
2001–2006	Denmark	4	(0)
- * Club domestic league appearances and goals

Martin Albrechtsen (Danish pronunciation: [ˈmɑːtsʰn̩ ˈælˌpʁɛkˀsn̩]; born 31 March 1980) is a Danish former professional footballer who primarily played as a centre-back. He currently plays for Danish amateur club FK Prespa. He played four games for the Danish national team and is the older brother of Jacob Albrechtsen.

== Career ==
=== Akademisk Boldklub (AB) ===
Born in Værløse in the Capital Region of Denmark, Albrechtsen started his career at Akademisk Boldklub (AB). Alongside later Danish international Peter Løvenkrands, he was called up for the Danish under-19 national team in September 1997. In February 1998 they both signed their first professional contracts with AB, joining the senior squad which competed in the Danish Superliga championship. In the 1998–99 season, he scored 1 league goal in 9 games for tAB, while the following season he scores one goal in 31 league games.

Albrechtsen was a part of the AB team which won the 1999 Danish Cup, and he was named 2000 Danish under-21 Talent of the Year. He made his debut for the Denmark national football team under national team manager Morten Olsen in April 2001. As AB struggled financially, Albrechtsen was sold to defending Superliga champions F.C. Copenhagen (FCK) in a DKK 9 million transfer deal in January 2002.

=== F.C. Copenhagen ===
Albrechtsen signed a 4 1/2-year contract with Copenhagen, looking to replace former team captain Jacob Laursen in the central defence. In total he played 14 league games for Løverne in the latter part of the 2001-02-season, while he made 27 league matches in 2002–03. He helped the club.win the 2003 and 2004 Danish Superliga championships, as well as the 2004 Danish Cup trophy. His performances for the club led to two additional national team matches, but after an unimpressive effort during the 0–2 loss to Bosnia and Herzegovina in April 2003, his national team career went on a hiatus. He made his debut for the club on 3 March 2002 when they played 0–0 against AGF. Albrechtsen made his first European appearance for Copenhagen on 27 November 2003 when they drew 1–1 at Mallorca in a match in the UEFA Cup.

=== West Bromwich Albion ===
In June 2004, he moved abroad to play for English club West Bromwich Albion in the FA Premier League. He was bought in a £2.7 million transfer deal, making him the most expensive player the club had ever bought at that point. He made his debut for the club on 28 August 2004, coming on as a substitute in a Premiership match against Everton. Albrechtsen was a regular for Albion during 2004–05, helping them to avoid relegation on the final day of the season. He also figured prominently during the following season, and scored his first ever goal for the club in the 1–0 win against Wigan Athletic at the JJB Stadium in January 2006. He stayed with the club as Albion were relegated to the secondary English Football League in the summer 2006, and he scored his second goal for the club against Leeds United in September 2006. After an absence of more than three years, he was recalled for the Danish national team in November 2006.

Despite being signed as a central-defender, Albrechtsen had, prior to the 2007–08 season, been utilised mainly as a full-back. In August 2007 however, Albion manager Tony Mowbray decided to move the Danish player back into the centre of defence. Albrechtsen made his 100th appearance for Albion in the 1–0 defeat at Sheffield United on 25 August 2007.

=== Derby County ===
After failing to agree terms with West Brom on a new deal, Albrechsten joined Derby County on a Bosman free transfer, signing a two-year contract with the club on 30 June 2008. In the process he became manager Paul Jewell's eighth signing of the season. Albrechtsen made his debut for Derby in a 1–0 home defeat to Doncaster Rovers on the opening day of the 2008–09 season, and in September scored his first goal for the club, against Cardiff City and netted his second in the next match, a 2–0 win at Queens Park Rangers. Albrechtsen's fine start to his Derby career saw him nominated for the September Championship Player of the Month award, though he lost out to Reading's Kevin Doyle. The following month he underwent a hernia operation and kept him away from first team action for around a month. On his return from injury, he slotted back into the defence and on 18 February he played in his 300th career league game against Blackpool at Pride Park. He quickly fell out of favour with new manager Nigel Clough, however, and his contract at the club was cancelled by mutual consent on 30 August 2009. After a few days joining FC Midtjylland, Albrechtsen revealed the motives behind his decision to part ways with Derby County. He claimed to have been annoyed at being handed a number of fines by Clough for breaches of club rules like doing interviews without permission.

=== FC Midtjylland ===
After being released from Derby County, FC Midtjylland announced the club have signed Albrechtsen on a free transfer and returned to Denmark after spending 5 years in England. Following his move, Albrechtsen was given a number 5 shirt. Albrechtsen made his debut in a FC Midtjylland shirt against FC Nordsjælland on 12 September 2009 in a 2–0 loss. Albrechtsen scored his first goal for the club against Aalborg BK in a 3–2 win on 2 May 2010. In his first season, Albrechtsen made 21 appearances and scoring 1. In his second season, Albrechtsen scored his first of the season against Silkeborg IF in a 2–1 win on 27 November 2010 and scored his second of the season against F.C. Copenhagen in a 5–2 loss on 19 May 2011. Albrechtsen made 20 appearances and scoring 2.

=== Brøndby IF ===
He signed a one-year-long contract with Brøndby IF on 15 August 2012. On 2 April 2013 the contract was renewed for another two years.

=== AC Horsens ===
On 23 December 2016 it was announced, that Albrechtsen had signed half-year contract with AC Horsens, starting from the new year. Albrechtsen suffered from several injuries in the first four months at his new club.

He played his first game for the club on 18 February 2017 against Silkeborg IF. Albrechtsen had suffered from some problems in his groin since the start of the season. The problem became more and more comprehensive during the season, and he was actually out on the sideline from March to May 2017. He left the club at the end of the season.

=== BK Avarta ===
After leaving AC Horsens, Albrechtsen signed for BK Avarta, where he also got reunited with his brother, Jacob, who already played there. Albrechtsen left the club again when his contract expired at the end of the year, due to the lack of playing time and for personal reasons.

=== Later career ===
In January 2018, Albrechtsen joined Denmark Series club VB 1968.

After a spell at FC Græsrødderne, Albrechtsen returned to VB 1968 in July 2021. On 31 January 2023 Albrechtsen confirmed, that he had left VB 1968. In April 2023, he moved to Fremad Valby and in August, to FK Prespa.

== Trivia ==
- Albrechtsen's nicknames include Dolph and He-Man, due to his resemblance to the actor Dolph Lundgren (who portrayed He-Man in the movie Masters of the Universe).

== Personal life ==
Albrechtsen has two children, Justin and Cassandra. He had their names displayed on a specially designed pair of football boots, which he wore in a league match against Sheffield United in February 2008. The boots were a present from his girlfriend Camilla Malmberg. However, Albrechtsen and Camilla got separated in 2011. He later came in a relationship with a Danish model named Emilie Posborg, but got also separated in 2015.

It was revealed in 2016, that Albrechtsen's son, Justin, suffered from an extremely rare disease named esophageal atresia.

In 2023, he competed as a contestant on the Danish version of Survivor, Robinson Ekspeditionen.

== Honours ==
Akademisk Boldklub

- Danish Cup: 1998–99

Copenhagen

- Danish Cup: 2003–04
- Danish Superliga: 2003, 2004

West Bromwich Albion

- Football League Championship: 2007–08

Individual

- Danish U-21 Talent of the Year: 2000
