= Dan Anton Johansen =

Danish footballer (born 1979)

Personal information
- Full name: Dan Anton Johansen
- Date of birth: August 13, 1979 (age 47)
- Place of birth: Denmark
- Position: Defender

Youth career
- Brøndby IF

Senior career*
| Years | Team | Apps | (Gls) |
| 1999–2006 | Brøndby IF | 189 | (6) |
| 2006–2007 | Lillestrøm SK | 23 | (0) |
| 2008–2009 | Viborg FF | 28 | (1) |
| 2009–2010 | Hvidovre IF | | |

International career
| 1995 | Denmark u-16 | 3 | (0) |
| 1995–1996 | Denmark u-17 | 11 | (0) |
| 1996–1999 | Denmark u-19 | 19 | (1) |
| 1998–2001 | Denmark u-21 | 13 | (0) |
- * Club domestic league appearances and goals

Dan Anton Johansen (born August 13, 1979) is a Danish former professional footballer currently playing for Hvidovre IF. Johansen started his career with Danish team Brøndby IF in 1999, with whom he won the 2002 and 2005 Danish Superliga championships. He has played 46 matches for various Danish youth national teams, including 13 games for the Denmark national under-21 team.

== Biography ==
=== Brøndby ===
Johansen started playing football with Brøndby IF as a boy. He worked his way through the club's youth system, and represented various Danish national youth teams. Johansen played a combined total of 46 national youth team games, and scored one goal, and he won the 1995 Danish under-17 Talent of the Year award. He debuted for Brøndby IF's senior team on April 1, 1999, at age 19. He played his first seasons in as a central defender and was named Brøndby IF Player of the Year in 2000. Following the signing of Sweden international defender Andreas Jakobsson and the emergence of the five years younger Daniel Agger, Johansen found his place in the right back position. From his wide position, he showed a tendency to fire off volleys from a great distance, some with spectacular effect.

In 2004, the Danish football players' association went on a strike action, which meant a standstill of the Danish Superliga. For Brøndby, who was in European competition, it meant they would have to field a team consisting of retired Brøndby professionals, young players and recent signings who had yet to become members of the players' association, against FK Ventspils in the August 2004 UEFA Cup qualification re-match. Two days before the match, Johansen and Brøndby team captain Per Nielsen broke the strike and returned to the team training, causing a lot of controversy in the process. The day after, the players' and football clubs' associations reached a provisorical agreement, and Brøndby's first team players were selected for the match, though they were eliminated on aggregate.

During the Danish Superliga 2004-05 tournament, Johansen was pressured by the loaned-in defensive midfielder Sebastian Svärd, who went on to play several matches in the right back position. When Brøndby bought former Denmark international right back Thomas Rytter before the Danish Superliga 2005-06 season, Johansen publicly expressed his frustration of finding himself too far away from the starting line-up. Johansen used the chance to play, in the decisive match against RCD Espanyol in the UEFA Cup 2005-06 tournament, to get himself sent off. It was then expected he would look to other clubs in December 2005, when his Brøndby contract expired. In late December, Johansen signed a prolonged one-year contract with Brøndby, running to late December 2006.

He played just four games in the spring 2006, and in July 2006 he left Brøndby and signed a contract with Norwegian team Lillestrøm SK.

=== Lillestrøm ===
In February 2008, after two mediocre seasons for Lillestrøm, with few first-team appearances, Johansen was released on free transfer, and as of March 2008 he was without a club.

=== Viborg ===
Dan Anton Johansen joined Viborg as an amateur after Lillestrøm and went on to sign a contract for one year with the club.

=== Hvidovre ===
After his year at Viborg, Johansen played half a season with Hvidovre in the first division. They could not agree on an extension which forced Johansen to consider stopping his career as a 30-year-old.

== Honours ==
- 1995 Danish under-17 Talent of the Year
- 2000 Brøndby IF Player of the Year
- Danish Superliga: 2001–02 and 2004–05
- Danish Cup: 2002–03 and 2004–05
- Norwegian Cup: 2007
