= Christian Poulsen =

Danish footballer (born 1980)

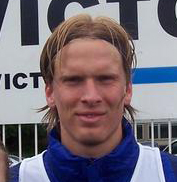
- Poulsen while at Schalke 04

Personal information
- Full name: Christian Bjørnshøj Poulsen
- Date of birth: 28 February 1980 (age 46)
- Place of birth: Asnæs, Denmark
- Height: 1.82 m (6 ft 0 in)
- Position: Defensive midfielder

Youth career
- 1985–1995: Asnæs BK
- 1995–1997: Holbæk

Senior career*
Years	Team	Apps	(Gls)
1997–2000	Holbæk	82	(13)
2000–2002	Copenhagen	45	(10)
2002–2006	Schalke 04	111	(3)
2006–2008	Sevilla	62	(4)
2008–2010	Juventus	48	(1)
2010–2011	Liverpool	12	(0)
2011–2012	Evian	24	(0)
2012–2014	Ajax	54	(1)
2014–2015	Copenhagen	16	(1)
Total		454	(33)

International career
1998–1999	Denmark U19	4	(0)
2001	Denmark U21	8	(0)
2001–2012	Denmark	92	(6)

Managerial career
- 2019–2021: Ajax (assistant)
- 2021–2024: Denmark (assistant)
- * Club domestic league appearances and goals

Christian Bjørnshøj Poulsen (Danish pronunciation: [ˈkʰʁɛs.djæn ˈpʰɔwlsn̩]; born 28 February 1980) is a Danish former footballer who played as a defensive midfielder. After starting his career with Holbæk, he played for a number of European clubs, winning the Danish Superliga championship with Copenhagen, the German DFB-Ligapokal trophy with Schalke 04, and the European UEFA Cup with Spanish team Sevilla, later also playing for Italian Serie A club Juventus, as well as Premier League side Liverpool, French side Evian, and Dutch side Ajax.

Since his debut in 2001, he was a regular member of the Denmark national football team and played 92 matches, scoring six goals for his country. He represented Denmark at the 2002 FIFA World Cup, 2010 FIFA World Cup and 2004 European Championship international tournaments. Poulsen was named 2001 Danish under-21 Player of the Year, and won the 2005 and 2006 Danish Player of the Year awards; the first to win two consecutive seasons.

== Club career ==
=== Early career ===
Born in Asnæs, Poulsen started playing in local club Asnæs BK. However, he moved to amateur club Holbæk at the age of 15, where he made his senior debut at 17 years of age, captaining the side on several occasions.

=== Copenhagen ===
In September 2000, he underwent a trial period for Copenhagen in the top-flight Danish Superliga championship, and signed his first professional contract with the club within a week. Poulsen took a commanding role in the attacking midfield of FCK, following the heart problems of former Norwegian international midfielder Ståle Solbakken in March 2001. Poulsen quickly made his mark on the league, and helped his club win the 2000–01 Superliga championship. He scored the 1–0 goal in the 3–1 win against second-placed Brøndby IF, which secured the league title.

Following a good start of the 2001–02 Superliga season, FCK ended runners-up in the 2001–02 Superliga, and Poulsen was named 2002 FCK Player of the Year. In the third qualifying stage of the 2001–02 Champions League, Copenhagen were beaten over two legs to Lazio. The club dropped into the 2001–02 UEFA Cup, where they were knocked out by Borussia Dortmund. Dortmund later reached the final of the competition, and expressed interest in Poulsen. After a change due to the release requirements by Copenhagen failed, Poulsen decided to play for Dortmund's arch-rivals Schalke 04.

=== Schalke 04 ===
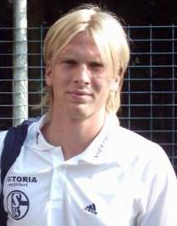
Poulsen with Schalke 04

After the 2002 World Cup, Poulsen made a €7M move, the most expensive sale by a Danish club at the time, to German club Schalke 04, where he looked to take over the position as holding midfielder left by veteran Czech international Jiří Němec. His start in Schalke was made easier by the fact that his teammate in the Denmark national team, Ebbe Sand, also played for the club. Through his time at Schalke, Poulsen played a number of matches at right back, but eventually secured a spot in the central midfield for both club and country.

In the 2005–06 Champions League, Schalke played two games against Italian club AC Milan. Following their first match, a 2–2 draw, Poulsen was described as "a coward" by Milan coach Carlo Ancelotti, alleging that Poulsen physically kicked Milan's Brazilian playmaker Kaká. In the second match Schalke lost 2–3, despite a goal by Poulsen. Following the final whistle, Italian player Gennaro Gattuso steered towards Poulsen and confronted him. Gattuso made gloating taunts, while Poulsen gave him a sarcastic thumbs up, afterwards declaring he found Gattuso childish and hoped he felt embarrassed for himself.

With Schalke, Poulsen won the 2005 DFB Ligapokal cup trophy. His displays for Schalke and the Denmark national team earned him the 2005 Danish Player of the Year award. After four seasons with the club, which included well over 100 appearances, his contract expired in June 2006. Long-lasting rumours linked him to several teams, including Italian clubs Inter Milan and AC Milan.

=== Sevilla ===
He eventually signed a contract with defending UEFA Cup champions Sevilla of Spain, the team that knocked Schalke out of the 2005–06 UEFA Cup tournament. In his debut match for the club, Poulsen helped Sevilla win the European Super Cup trophy, with a 3–0 victory against Barcelona on 25 August. Following his first month at the club, he was named the best new signing in Spain by Spanish sports daily Marca. He became the first player to be named Danish Player of the Year for two consecutive years, when he also won the 2006 award. He helped Sevilla defend the UEFA Cup title, winning the 2006–07 edition of the tournament and also won the Spanish Cup that year.

=== Juventus ===
On 14 July 2008, Juventus officially announced the acquisition of Poulsen from Sevilla. The transfer fee was €9.75M, with a four-year contract worth three million euros a year for Poulsen. On 8 February, Poulsen scored his first goal for Juventus against Catania in the 90th minute, earning a 2–1 win for his team after the game was heading for a 1–1 draw.

=== Liverpool ===
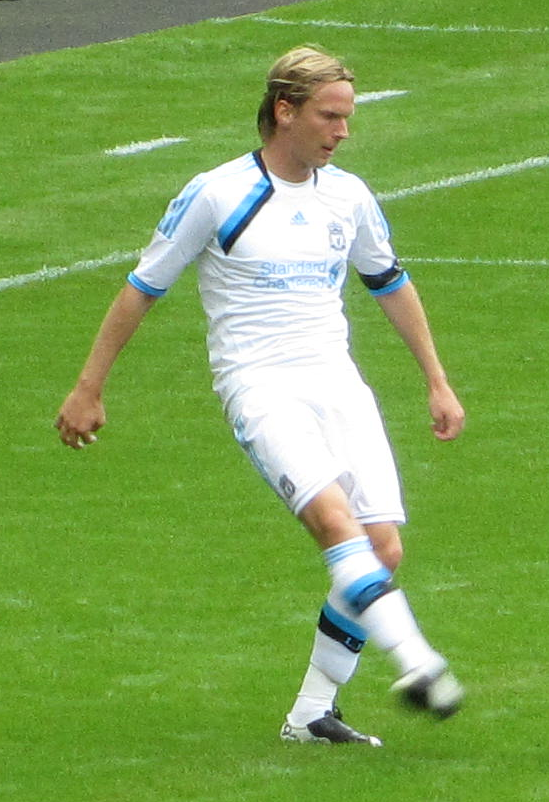
Poulsen playing for Liverpool in 2011

On 12 August 2010, Liverpool announced the signing of Poulsen on a three-year contract, for a fee of £4.5m. He was handed the number 28 shirt, previously worn by Damien Plessis.

On 19 August 2010, Poulsen made his debut against Turkish team Trabzonspor in the Europa League, in a match won by Liverpool 1–0, in which he had a goal disallowed. Poulsen made his league debut for Liverpool in a 1–0 win against West Bromwich Albion on 29 August 2010. He did not, however, endear himself to the Liverpool fans who often found his performances on the pitch lacking in skill. On 20 November, he produced probably his best display in the centre of Liverpool's midfield against West Ham United at Anfield, a game which the home side won 3–0. Following the sacking of Roy Hodgson, and the appointment of new manager Kenny Dalglish, the winds changed not only for Liverpool but also for Poulsen. Dalglish praised Poulsen's performances in the 1–2 defeat by Blackpool on 16 January 2011, the 3–0 win against Wolverhampton Wanderers on 22 January 2011, as well as the 1–0 win against Fulham on 26 January. Relatively soon after that, it did become clear that Dalglish preferred the young emerging midfielder Jay Spearing to Poulsen.

=== Évian ===
On 30 August 2011, Liverpool agreed an undisclosed fee with Évian for Poulsen's transfer to the Ligue 1 side.

On 31 August 2011, the French side announced that Poulsen had signed a one-year deal. After his transfer in France, he became the second player (out of four players) in history after Florin Răducioiu to play in all five of the big leagues (Germany, Spain, Italy, England and France).

=== Ajax ===
On 22 August 2012, Poulsen signed a contract with Dutch club Ajax binding him with the club for two seasons until 30 June 2014, coming over as a free transfer from Évian. Ajax acquired the defensive midfielder as a replacement for recently departed Vurnon Anita. During his first season in Amsterdam, Poulsen was a regular in the starting lineup, helping his side to secure their third consecutive national championship, and Christian's first in twelve years.

=== Return to Copenhagen ===
On 30 September 2014, Poulsen signed a one-year contract with Copenhagen, thus reuniting him with his former club, 12 years after he left them.

On 14 May 2015, he set up the winning goal for Brandur Olsen in the Danish cup final as Copenhagen went on to beat FC Vestsjælland 3–2 after extra-time. He played his last competitive match in his career against Hobro on 7 June 2015.

== International career ==
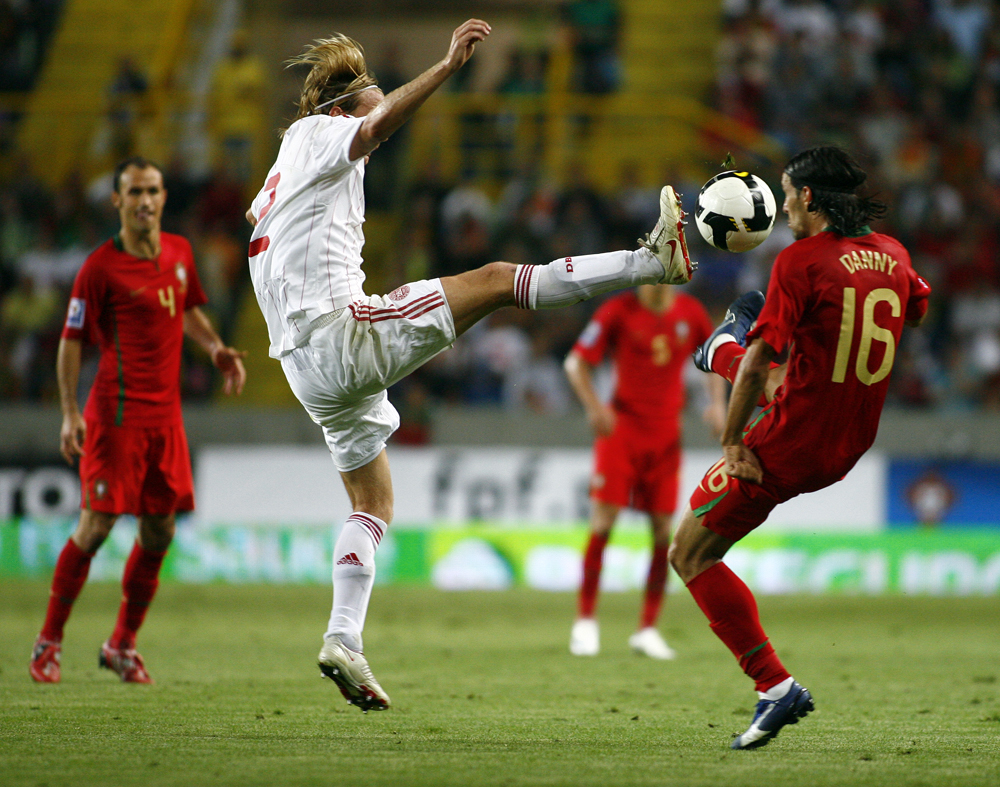
Poulsen playing in a 2010 World Cup qualifying game against Portugal.

Poulsen was called up for the Danish under-19 football team in September 1998, and played four games for the team.

Poulsen was called up for the Denmark national football team by national manager Morten Olsen. He got his debut when he started the 1–1 draw with the Netherlands on 10 November 2001. He was called up for the Danish squad for the 2002 FIFA World Cup, where he was initially used as a substitute. He took part in all three group stage matches, gradually getting more playing time in each game. Following two yellow cards in the group stage, he was suspended when Denmark were eliminated in the knock-out phase by England.

Poulsen was selected for the Danish squad at the 2004 European Championship. He played three of Denmark's four games, before Denmark was eliminated from the tournament. Following the 0–0 draw with Italy, Danish television showed Poulsen being spat on by Italian playmaker Francesco Totti. Totti received a three-match ban and gave a "full public apology", after failing in his claim that he was provoked by Poulsen. Italy were subsequently eliminated from the tournament in the group stage.

=== Rosenberg-Poulsen incident ===
In the 89th minute of the UEFA Euro 2008 qualifier against Sweden, Sweden's Markus Rosenberg struck Poulsen, who in turn punched Rosenberg. After conferring with his assistant referee, referee Herbert Fandel sent off Poulsen and awarded Sweden a penalty, which was never taken as a fan ran onto the pitch trying to punch the referee. The Danish player Michael Gravgaard grabbed a hold of the fan but the referee abandoned the game.

In the aftermath of the game, an angry fan attempted to press charges against Poulsen for punching Rosenberg. A member of the Copenhagen metropolitan police called for a month-long jail sentence, and Danish Minister of Justice Lene Espersen called for Poulsen's exclusion from the national team.

The prosecution service rejected the case on 18 June, and national team coach Morten Olsen re-called Poulsen for the national team.

== Style of play ==
As a central or defensive midfielder, Poulsen is known for his aggressive tackling. Although he usually plays in a holding midfield role, he is capable of being deployed in more advanced midfield positions. In his early career, he initially played as a full-back, before being moved to a midfield role. He played as a makeshift centre-back on occasion.

== Coaching career ==
In the summer 2016, Poulsen and former Danish international player, Per Krøldrup, was hired as special coaches at B.93. Beside that, Poulsen was also studying a master in business coaching.

In September 2018, Poulsen returned to Ajax in a kind of coach internship, where he was going to follow the coaching staff club's first team for the rest of the year. On 1 July 2019, Poulsen joined Ajax as assistant manager under manager Erik ten Hag. He left the club on 1 July 2021.

On 25 September 2021, Poulsen was presented as the new assistant coach of the Denmark national team under Kasper Hjulmand. Following Hjulmand's resignation in July 2024, Poulsen left his job as assistant manager on 8 August 2024.

== Honours ==
Copenhagen

- Danish Superliga: 2000–01
- Danish Cup: 2014–15

Schalke 04

- DFB Ligapokal: 2005
- UEFA Intertoto Cup: 2004

Sevilla

- Copa del Rey: 2006–07
- Supercopa de España: 2007
- UEFA Cup: 2006–07
- UEFA Super Cup: 2006

Ajax

- Eredivisie: 2012–13, 2013–14
- Johan Cruijff Shield: 2013

Individual

- Danish Young Player of the Year: 2001
- Danish Football Player of the Year: 2005, 2006

Sporting positions
Preceded by Jon Dahl Tomasson	Denmark captain 2010–2012	Succeeded by Daniel Agger
