= Thomas Rytter =

Danish footballer (born 1974)

Personal information
- Full name: Thomas Rytter Jakobsen
- Date of birth: 6 January 1974 (age 52)
- Place of birth: Copenhagen, Denmark
- Height: 1.80 m (5 ft 11 in)
- Position: Right back

Team information
- Current team: Blovstrød IF (Manager)

Senior career*
Years	Team	Apps	(Gls)
1992–1996	Lyngby	129	(1)
1996–1998	Sevilla	34	(1)
1998–2001	FC Copenhagen	95	(3)
2001–2005	VfL Wolfsburg	87	(1)
2005–2008	Brøndby	49	(0)
Total		394	(6)

International career
1992–1993	Denmark U19	5	(0)
1993–1996	Denmark U21	22	(0)
1996–2003	Denmark	4	(0)

Managerial career
- 2009–2010: Frederiksværk FK (assistant)
- 2010–2011: Frederiksværk FK
- 2011–2014: Virum Sorgenfri
- 2014–2015: Frederiksværk FK
- 2015–: Blovstrød IF
- * Club domestic league appearances and goals

Thomas Rytter Jakobsen (born 6 January 1974) is a Danish former footballer and manager, who played as a right-back. He is currently the manager of Blovstrød IF.

In 2001, he won the Danish Superliga championship with F.C. Copenhagen, and most prominently played for Spanish club Sevilla and German club Wolfsburg. Rytter was named 1994 Danish under-21 Talent of the Year, and he played four matches for the Danish national team between 1996 and 2003.

== Career ==
=== Early career ===
Born in Copenhagen, Rytter started his career at Lyngby Boldklub. He made his senior debut for the club in 1992, 18 years old, and immediately secured himself a place in the Lyngby first team squad. Rytter was one of several promising young Lyngby players, including later Danish internationals Dennis Rommedahl and Niclas Jensen, and he was called up for the Danish under-19 national team in October 1992. He went on to play 22 matches for the Danish under-21 national team from 1993 to 1996, and won the 1994 Danish under-21 Talent of the Year award.

=== Sevilla ===
Rytter was called up for Danish national team coach Bo Johansson's debut game, and got his international debut in the 1–0 win against Sweden on 14 August 1996. After five seasons at Lyngby, Rytter left the club in the winter 1996. He was sold by Lyngby CEO Flemming Østergaard to Spanish club Sevilla FC in the La Liga championship. Rytter made his debut for Sevilla in December 1996. In his first year at the club, Sevilla were relegated to the Segunda División. Rytter played the first half of the next season for Sevilla, before moving back to Denmark in January 1998.

=== Return to Denmark ===
Bought by F.C. Copenhagen (FCK) CEO Flemming Østergaard, Rytter made his FCK debut in March 1998. At FCK, he was reunited with former Lyngby teammate Niclas Jensen, and the two formed a wingback duo that was known as the best in the Superliga. Rytter was a part of the FCK team which won the 2001 Superliga trophy, and was once again called up for the Danish national team, by new national coach Morten Olsen. He played his second national team game in November 2001.

=== Wolfsburg ===
His contract with FCK was set to run out in the summer 2002, and in the winter 2001, Rytter and FCK failed to agree on a contract extension. He was initially benched, but was eventually sold to Bundesliga club VfL Wolfsburg in December 2001.

=== Retirement at Brøndby ===
He played three and a half seasons at Wolfsburg, and was twice called up for the Danish national team by Morten Olsen. In July 2005, he moved back to Denmark to Brøndby IF, the main rivals of his former club FCK. This caused controversy in FCK, where Flemming Østergaard concluded that all footballers are egoists as Thomas was like a son to him. Thomas Rytter replied "I already have a father, and his name is Frank". In his first season at Brøndby, injuries reduced his playing time. On 25 August 2008 he retired from professional football.

== Honours ==
- 1994 Danish under-21 Talent of the Year
- 2001 Danish Superliga, with F.C. Copenhagen
- 2008 Danish Cup, with Brøndby IF
