= Robinson Ekspeditionen 2023 =

2023 Danish reality television series

- Season 24
- Presented by: Jakob Kjeldbjerg
- No. of days: 42
- No. of castaways: 22
- Winner: Majbritt Fejfer Olsen
- Runners-up: Nicole Malanowicz; Pia Kjær
- Location: Langkawi, Malaysia
- No. of episodes: 15

Release
- Original network: TV3
- Original release: September 4 – November 30, 2023

Season chronology
- ← Previous; 2022 Next → 2024

Robinson Ekspeditionen 2023 is the twenty-fourth season of the Danish reality television series Robinson Ekspeditionen. This season returns to Langkawi, Malaysia for the second consecutive time where 22 Danes from across the Danish Realm compete against each other in tribes to win supplies, food, luxury, all whilst trying to survive. In the end, after 42 days, the winner will receive the grand prize of 500,000kr. and be crowned Robinson 2023. The season premiered on 4 September 2023 on TV3. The season concluded on 27 November 2023 where Majbritt Fejfer Olsen won in the final challenge against Nicole Malanowicz & Pia Kjær to win the grand prize of 500,000kr. and win the title of Robinson 2023.

== Contestants ==
Notable cast members includes former professional football player Martin Albrechtsen.

List of Robinson Ekspeditionen 2023
Contestant	Original Tribe	First Switch Tribe	Second Switch Tribe	Merged Tribe	Finish
Lotte Østergaard Hastrup; 44, Nuuk, Greenland	South Team	North Team			Lost Duel; Day 4
Maria Skov Rasmussen; 31, Vejle	South Team	South Team			1st Voted Out; Day 6
Nynne Thøger Navntoft; 25, Amagerbro	North Team	North Team			2nd Voted Out; Day 10
Johannes Gjerskov Hylby; 30, Copenhagen	North Team	North Team	North Team		Quit; Day 12
Nour Abdelema; 23, Brøndby Strand	South Team	South Team	South Team		3rd Voted Out; Day 13
Mathilde B. Marott; 22, Herlev	North Team	North Team	North Team		4th Voted Out; Day 16
Anas Asfour El-Barq; 30, Amager	South Team	South Team	North Team		Quit due to Injury; Day 19
Tais Friis Vallestrand; 31, Odense	North Team	North Team	North Team		5th Voted Out; Day 19
Jakob Toft; 42, Esbjerg	North Team	North Team	North Team		Lost Challenge; 1st Jury Member; Day 21
Martin Albrechtsen; 42, Copenhagen	North Team	North Team	North Team	Robinson	6th Voted Out; 2nd Jury Member; Day 25
Ivan Bossano Prescott; 23, Aarhus	North Team	North Team	North Team	Robinson	Lost challenge 3rd Jury Member; Day 27
Louise Mammen; 42, Skanderborg	North Team	North Team	North Team	Robinson	Medically evacuated 4th Jury Member; Day 29
Kaleepan Karunakaran; 34, Lunderskov	South Team	South Team	South Team	None	7th Voted Out; 5th Jury Member; Day 33
Kemal Yasar; 42, Herlev	South Team	South Team	South Team	Robinson	Lost Duel; 6th Jury Member; Day 34
Marie Willumsen; 26, Ishøj	North Team	North Team	North Team	Robinson	8th Voted Out; 7th Jury Member; Day 35
Simon Willrodt; 32, Nørrebro	North Team	North Team	North Team	Robinson	Lost Challenge; 8th Jury Member; Day 37
Aleksander Balling Abildgaard; 32, Copenhagen	South Team	South Team	South Team	Robinson	Lost Duel; Day 38
Lars Schlaikjer; 47, Lille Skensved	South Team	South Team	South Team	Robinson	Lost Challenge; Day 41
Frederik Hametner Laursen; 33, Thyborøn	South Team	South Team	South Team	Robinson	Lost Challenge; Day 41
Pia Kjær; 25, Aars	South Team	South Team	South Team	Robinson	2nd Runner-up; Day 42
Nicole Malanowicz; 24, Copenhagen	South Team	South Team	South Team	Robinson	Runner-up; Day 42
Majbritt Fejfer Olsen; 27, Aarhus	North Team	North Team	North Team	Robinson	Robinson; Day 42

== Season summary ==
Robinson Ekspeditionen 2023 summary
Episode		Challenge winner(s)		Voted out		
No.	Air date	Reward	Immunity	Tribe	Player	Day
1	4 September 2023	South Team	North Team	South Team	Lotte	Day 3
2	11 September 2023	South Team	North Team	North Team	Lotte	Day 4
2	11 September 2023	South Team	North Team	South Team	Maria	Day 6
3	18 September 2023	North Team	South Team	North Team	Nynne	Day 10
4	25 September 2023	North Team	North Team	North Team	Johannes	Day 12
4	25 September 2023	North Team	North Team	South Team	Nour	Day 13
5	2 October 2023	South Team	South Team	North Team	Mathilde	Day 16
6	9 October 2023	South Team	South Team	North Team	Anas	Day 19
6	9 October 2023	South Team	South Team	North Team	Tais	Day 19
7	16 October 2023	Lars, Majbritt, Simon [Frederik, Ivan, Martin, Pia]		None	Jakob	Day 21
7	16 October 2023		Nicole [Aleksander]	None	Jakob	Day 21
8	23 October 2023	Nicole [Aleksander, Pia]	Nicole	Robinson	Martin	Day 25
8	23 October 2023	Louise	Nicole	Robinson	Martin	Day 25
9	30 October 2023	Frederik [Aleksander]	Marie	Robinson	Ivan	Day 27
9	30 October 2023	Louise, Kaleepan [Kemal, Marie]	Marie	Robinson	Louise	Day 29
10	6 November 2023	Robinson; Auction (Note: Instead of a regular reward challenge, the contestants were taken to the Robinson Auction where they were given money and made bids on items to have for themselves.)	Marie	Robinson	Kaleepan	Day 33
10	6 November 2023	Aleksander; Pia	Marie	Robinson	Kaleepan	Day 33
11	13 November 2023	Aleksander [Frederik, Majbritt, Marie]	Aleksander	Robinson	Kemal	Day 34
11	13 November 2023	Aleksander [Frederik, Majbritt, Marie]	Aleksander	Robinson	Marie	Day 35
12	20 November 2023	Lars, Nicole [Frederik, Pia]		Robinson	Simon	Day 37
13	26 November 2023	None	Majbritt	Robinson	Aleksander	Day 38
14	27 November 2023	None	Pia; Majbritt	Robinson	Lars	Day 41
14	27 November 2023	None	Pia; Majbritt	Robinson	Frederik	Day 41
14	27 November 2023	None		Robinson	Pia	Day 42
14	27 November 2023	None		Robinson	Nicole	Day 42
14	27 November 2023	None		Robinson	Majbritt	Day 42
15	30 November 2023	Recap/Reunion Episode				

== Voting history ==
	Original tribes	First switched tribes				Second switched tribes						Merged tribe																
Episode	1	2		3		4		5	6			7	8		9			10	11		12	13			14			
Day	3	4	6	10		12	13	16	19			21	25		27	29		33	34	35	37	38			41			42
Tribe	South	North	South	North		North	South	North	North	North		None	Robinson		Robinson	Robinson		None	Robinson	Robinson	Robinson	Robinson			Robinson			Robinson
Eliminated	Lotte (Note: In a surprise twist, instead of voting out players, the South Team would vote for one person to be swapped to the North Team. Lotte was "voted out" and swapped to the North Team.)	Lotte	Maria	Nynne		Johannes	Nour	Mathilde	Anas	Tais		Jakob	Martin		Ivan	~~Lars~~	Louise	Kaleepan	Kemal	Marie	Simon	Majbritt (Note: The merged tribe and, then, the jury voted to send two members to an elimination challenge.)	Aleksander	Aleksander	Lars, Frederik			Pia, Nicole
Votes	10-1	None	9-1	10-2-1		None	5-3	9-1	None	9-1		None	8-2-1		None	~~8-1~~	None	9-1	None	6-2	None	5-1	5-3	None				
Voter	Vote	Challenge	Vote									Challenge	Vote		Challenge	Vote			Challenge	Vote	Challenge	Vote		Challenge				
Majbritt				Nynne				Mathilde		Tais		Immune	Martin			~~Lars~~		Kaleepan		Frederik	Won	Pia	None	Won	Lost	Won		1st
Nicole	Lotte		Maria				Nour					Won	Martin			~~Lars~~		Kaleepan		Marie		Majbritt	None		Lost	Lost	Won	2nd
Pia	Lotte		Maria				Nour					Immune	Martin			~~Lars~~		Kaleepan		Marie		Majbritt	None		Won			3rd
Frederik	Lotte	Won	Maria				Nour					Immune	Martin			~~Lars~~		Kaleepan		Marie		Majbritt	None		Lost	Lost	Lost	
Lars	Lotte		Maria				Nour					Immune	Martin			~~Majbritt~~		Kaleepan		Marie		Majbritt	None		Lost	Lost	Lost	
Aleksander	Lotte		Maria				Nour					Saved	Martin			~~Lars~~		Kaleepan		Marie	Won	Majbritt	None	Lost				
Simon				Nynne				Mathilde		Tais		Immune	Martin			~~Lars~~		Kaleepan	Won	Marie	Lost		Aleksander					
Marie				Nynne				Mathilde		Tais						~~Lars~~		Kaleepan	Won	Frederik			Aleksander					
Kemal	Lotte		Maria	Jakob (Note: Kemal had received two extra votes in the next Tribal Council regardless of him being a part of it.)	Jakob		Lars											Kaleepan	Lost				Pia					
Kaleepan	Lotte		Maria				Lars								Won			Kemal					Pia					
Louise				Nynne				Mathilde		Tais			Martin		Won	~~Lars~~	Evacuated						Aleksander					
Ivan				Nynne				Mathilde		Tais		Immune			Lost								Aleksander					
Martin				Nynne				Mathilde		Tais		Immune	Louise										Pia					
Jakob				Nynne				Mathilde		Tais		Lost											Aleksander					
Tais				Nynne				Mathilde		Louise																		
Anas	Lotte		Maria					Mathilde	Quit																			
Mathilde				Nynne				Tais																				
Nour	Lotte		Maria				Lars																					
Johannes				Nynne		Quit																						
Nynne				Louise																								
Maria	Lotte		Nour																									
Lotte	Nour	Lost																										
Penalty										Tais (Note: Tais received two penalty votes against him after losing a duel against Kaleepan.)	Tais		Lars (Note: Lars received two penalty votes against him after finishing last in the challenge.)	Lars														
