= Jesper Håkansson =

Danish footballer (born 1981)

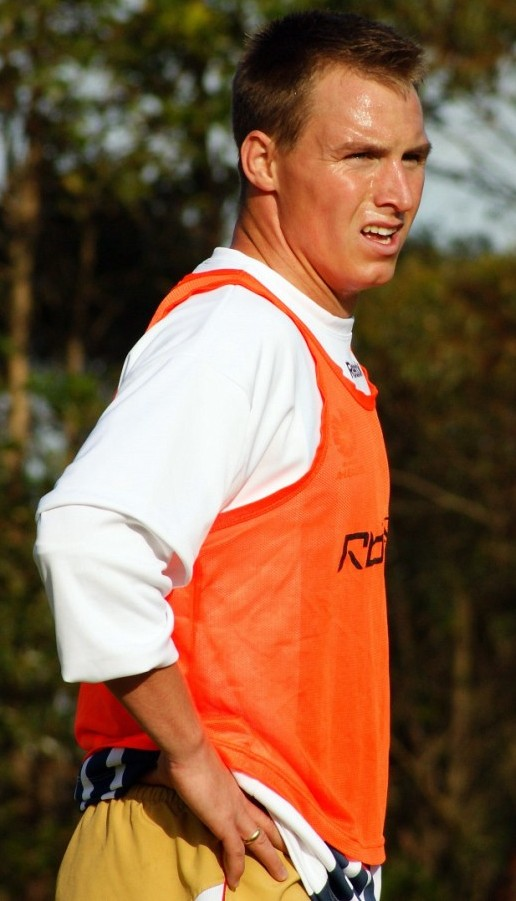

Personal information
- Date of birth: 14 August 1981 (age 45)
- Place of birth: Albertslund, Denmark
- Height: 1.75 m (5 ft 9 in)
- Positions: Attacking midfielder; forward; winger

Youth career
- Frem

Senior career*
Years	Team	Apps	(Gls)
1998–1999	Frem	32	(5)
1999–2005	Heerenveen	45	(10)
2003	→ Viborg (loan)	6	(0)
2004–2005	→ RBC Roosendaal (loan)	24	(6)
2005–2006	Djurgården	1	(0)
2006–2007	ADO Den Haag	6	(0)
2007–2008	Lyngby	23	(3)
2008–2009	Newcastle United Jets	10	(0)
2009	Amager		
2009	Frem	7	(5)
2009–2010	AB	15	(1)
2010–2015	Roskilde		

International career^{‡}
1996	Denmark U16	4	(0)
1996–1998	Denmark U17	34	(4)
1998–1999	Denmark U19	5	(2)
2002	Denmark U20	4	(1)
1999–2002	Denmark U21	4	(0)

Managerial career
- 2023: FC Roskilde
- * Club domestic league appearances and goals as of 21:14, 28 August 2010 (UTC) ‡ National team caps and goals as of 19:38, 29 June 2010 (UTC)

Jesper Håkansson (born 14 August 1981) is a Danish former professional footballer. He mostly appeared as a midfielder or a forward. He was most recently the manager of FC Roskilde.

== Club career ==
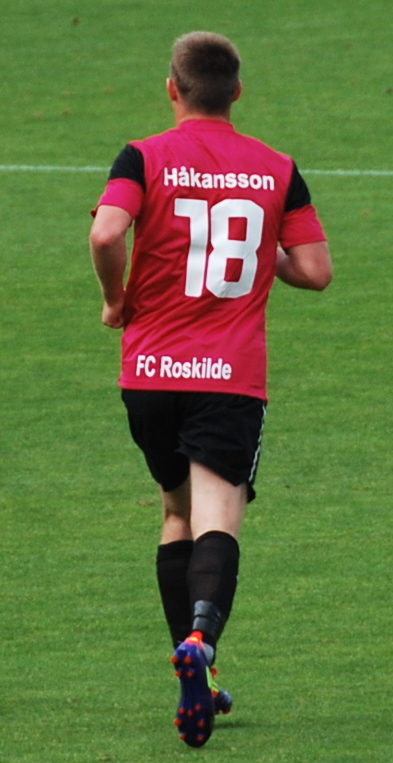
Håkansson in August 2011

Håkansson can play as attacking midfield, winger or striker and has extensive experience having played in the Danish, Dutch and Swedish leagues.

In 1997 Håkansson won the Danish Under-17 Player of the Year award. He made his first-team debut in the Danish 1st Division at age 16, making him the second youngest BK Frem player ever after Sophus Nielsen.

After leaving BK Frem in 1999, Håkansson went on trial with Manchester United; however, he chose to join Dutch Eredivisie club Heerenveen, where he believed he would get more game time. He scored a goal on his debut against Dutch giants Ajax. After a short loan spell back in Denmark with Viborg in 2003, he returned to Heerenveen before spending the entire 2004–05 season on loan to RBC Roosendaal. He then joined Djurgården in Sweden, for whom he only made one appearance.

After a year in Sweden, Håkansson returned to the Netherlands to play for ADO Den Haag, but he did not make his debut until 19 January 2007, coming on for the last 10 minutes of a 3–1 loss at home to AZ Alkmaar. Early in the 2007–08 season, he then moved back to Denmark to play with Lyngby BK. He scored three goals for Lyngby, including one in his last game for the club on 24 May 2007 against Copenhagen.

Håkansson signed a two-year contract with the Newcastle United Jets on 30 July 2008 after a week-long trial. He made his debut for the Newcastle Jets on 29 August 2008, in a 5–0 defeat at the hands of Melbourne Victory. His time in Australia was marked by frequent injuries, and he played just 10 times for Newcastle before being released on 30 January 2009, so that he could return to Europe. Six weeks later, he signed with FC Amager but after less than a month they went bankrupt and he joined his former club, Frem, scoring five goals in just seven appearances. After the season, it was announced that Frem would only be allowed to sign amateur contracts and Håkansson had to find a new club for the third time in six months.

In June 2009, he signed for second-tier club AB. Håkansson made 16 appearances for AB, scoring one goal, but when AB missed out on promotion, Håkansson was released. He later signed for FC Roskilde, where he stayed for five years before retiring in 2015.

== International career ==
He has represented Denmark at under-16, under-17, under-19, under-20 and under-21 levels. He is the third youngest player to have represented Denmark at the under-21 level.

In April 2007 he was called up for the Danish national team, but has not yet featured in a competitive game.

== Managerial career ==
In 2023 he returned to FC Roskilde as manager of the club. After only two games in charge of the team, he left the club by mutual consent.

== Honours ==
=== Club ===
Djurgården

- Allsvenskan: 2005
- Svenska Cupen: 2005

=== Individual ===
- DFA U-17 Player of the Year: 1997
