= Flemming Ahlberg =

Danish footballer (born 1946)

Personal information
- Full name: Flemming Ahlberg
- Date of birth: 23 November 1946 (age 79)
- Place of birth: Jægersborg, Denmark
- Position: Right full back

Youth career
- Skovshoved IF

Senior career*
Years	Team	Apps	(Gls)
1965–1967	Skovshoved IF	50	
1967–1979	Boldklubben Frem	332	(14)
1980–1986	B 1903	140	

International career
1968–1973	Denmark U21	13	(0)
1972–1978	Denmark	33	(0)
- * Club domestic league appearances and goals

Flemming Ahlberg (born 23 November 1946) is a Danish former footballer who participated in the 1972 Olympics in Munich.

Ahlberg, who later worked as an electrician, was voted Danish Player of the Year in 1976. He was also part of the Frem team that won the 1978 Danish Cup after playing three finals in a span of three months. Ahlberg participated in the last two finals and scored in the penalty shootout in the third.

== Honours ==
Individual

- Danish Player of the Year: 1976

Team

- Danish Cup: 1978 with Frem
