= Robinson Ekspeditionen 2025 =

- Season 26
- Presented by: Jakob Kjeldbjerg
- No. of days: 41
- No. of castaways: 20
- Winner: Anton Basbas Pedersen
- Runners-up: Tanja Pors; Line Bøg Risager
- Location: Langkawi, Malaysia
- No. of episodes: 18

Release
- Original network: TV3
- Original release: September 1 – December 16, 2025

Season chronology
- ← Previous; 2024 Next → 2026

Robinson Ekspeditionen 2025 is the twenty-sixth season of the Danish reality television series Robinson Ekspeditionen. 20 contestants compete for 41 days in Langkawi, Malaysia for a chance to win 500,000kr.. Competing in challenges in two tribes for food, comfort and immunity. The season is once again hosted by Jakob Kjeldbjerg and the season premiered on 1 September 2025 on TV3.

== Contestants ==
Notable cast members includes Andreas Holm Jensen, a former contestant on Bachelorette. Anders Thimm, former contestant on Landmand søger kærlighed and Kira Smed Sørensen, a former contestant on True Love Danmark.

List of Robinson Ekspeditionen 2025 contestants
Contestant	Original Tribe	Post Loser's Island	Switched Tribe	Merged Tribe	Voted Out	Loser's Island	Finish
Dennis Nordenbøl; Returned to Game					Lost Challenge; Day 1	Won Challenge; Day 3	
Trine Damgaard Lidsmoes; Returned to Game					Lost Challenge; Day 1	Won Challenge; Day 3	
Robert Hansen; 38, Emdrup	South Team	South Team			Medically evacuated Day 3		20th
Sanne Bechsøfft Thomsen; 35, Ødsted					Lost Challenge; Day 1	1st Voted Out; Day 6	19th
Maria Bergmann Nielsen; Returned to Game					Lost Challenge; Day 1	Survived Vote; Day 6	
Mathilde Schlotfeldt Hansen; Returned to Game	North Team	North Team			2nd Voted Out; Day 10		
Maria Bergmann Nielsen; 41, Hørning		South Team			Lost Duel; Day 10		18th
Mathilde Schlotfeldt Hansen; 27, Frederiksberg	North Team	North Team			3rd Voted Out; Day 12		17th
Henrik Baun; 54, Herning	South Team	South Team			4th Voted Out; Day 15		16th
Katrine Soon Rask; 31, Copenhagen	South Team	South Team	South Team		5th Voted Out; Day 17		15th
Kira Smed Sørensen; 31, Vanløse	South Team	South Team	South Team		6th Voted Out; Day 20		14th
René Gaasvig; 35, Ballerup	North Team	North Team	North Team		Lost Duel; 1st Jury Member; Day 22		13th
Anton Basbas Pedersen; Returned to Game	South Team	South Team	South Team	Robinson	7th Voted Out; Day 25		
Irene Kubel Madsen; 34, Esbjerg	North Team	North Team	South Team	Robinson	Lost Duel; 2nd Jury Member; Day 25		12th
Marco Manzionna; 31, Høje Gladsaxe	North Team	North Team	North Team	Robinson	8th Voted Out; 3rd Jury Member; Day 28		11th
Trine Damgaard Lidsmoes; 35, Store Merløse		North Team	South Team	Robinson	Lost Challenge; 4th Jury Member; Day 30		10th
Sheila Kimie Güntlisberger; 38, Hedehusene	North Team	North Team	South Team	Robinson	9th Voted Out; 5th Jury Member; Day 31		9th
Alexander Falkenberg; 30, Egå	North Team	North Team	North Team	Robinson	10th Voted Out; 6th Jury Member; Day 34		8th
Anders Thimm; 36, Kristiansand, Norway	North Team	North Team	North Team	Robinson	Lost Duel; Day 37		7th
Andreas Holm Jensen; 32, Frederiksberg	South Team	South Team	North Team	Robinson	Lost Challenge; Day 38		6th
Tore Sebastian Bentsen; 32, Kongens Enghave	North Team	North Team	North Team	Robinson	Ejected; Day 39		5th
Dennis Nordenbøl; 40, Brøndbyøster		North Team	South Team	Robinson	Lost Duel; Day 40		4th
Line Bøg Risager; 29, Sindal	South Team	South Team	North Team	Robinson	2nd Runner-up; Day 41		3rd
Tanja Pors; 25, Odense	South Team	South Team	North Team	Robinson	Runner-up; Day 41		2nd
Anton Basbas Pedersen; 24, Copenhagen	South Team	South Team	South Team	Robinson	Robinson; Day 41		1st

== Season summary ==
Episode	Air date	Challenges		Eliminated	Vote	Finish
Episode	Air date	Reward	Immunity	Eliminated	Vote	Finish
Episode 1	1 September 2025	Alexander, Henrik (Note: Contestants were divided into pairs of two, the winners were made the team captains of the new tribes, choosing their teammates and being immune from the first tribal council.)				
Episode 2	8 September 2025	South Team	Dennis, Trine (Note: Dennis and Trine won the challenge to reenter the game.)			
Episode 3	15 September 2025		North Team	Robert	0	Medically evacuated Day 3
Episode 3	15 September 2025		North Team	Sanne	8-1	1st Voted Out; Day 6
Episode 4	22 September 2025	South Team	South Team	Maria	0	Lost Duel; Day 9 (Note: Mathilde was voted out by the tribe to compete in a duel against Maria (who herself lost to Dennis), to determine who is permanently eliminated.)
Episode 4	22 September 2025	South Team	South Team	Mathilde	7-3	2nd Voted Out; Day 10
Episode 5	29 September 2025	South Team	South Team	Maria	0	Lost Duel; Day 10
Episode 5	29 September 2025	South Team	South Team	Mathilde	9-1	3rd Voted Out; Day 12
Episode 6	6 October 2025	South Team	North Team	Henrik	6-1	4th Voted Out; Day 15
Episode 7	13 October 2025	North Team		Katrine	4-2-1	5th Voted Out; Day 17
Episode 8	20 October 2025	South Team	North Team	Kira	5-3	6th Voted Out; Day 20
Episode 9	26 October 2025	Recap Episode/Eliminated Contestants Behind the Scenes Interviews				
Episode 10	27 October 2025	Irene (Note: The reward challenge occurred after René was eliminated from the game.)		René	0	Lost Duel; 1st Jury Member; Day 22
Episode 11	3 November 2025	Anton		Anton	5-4-2-1	7th Voted Out; Day 25
Episode 11	3 November 2025	Anton		Irene	0	Lost Duel; 2nd Jury Member; Day 25
Episode 12	10 November 2025	Robinson; Auction	Sheila	Marco	7-3-2	8th Voted Out; 3rd Jury Member; Day 28
Episode 13	17 November 2025	Anton {Sheila, Trine}	Alexander, Anders, Andreas, Line, Tanja, Tore	Trine	0	Lost Challenge; 4th Jury Member; Day 30
Episode 13	17 November 2025	Anton {Sheila, Trine}	Alexander, Anders, Andreas, Line, Tanja, Tore	Sheila	7-1-1	9th Voted Out; 5th Jury Member; Day 31
Episode 14	24 November 2025	Tanja {Andreas, Line}	Anton	Alexander	9-4	10th Voted Out; 6th Jury Member; Day 34
Episode 15	1 December 2025	Dennis, Tore (Note: Dennis won immunity via a duel against Andreas. Tore won immunity in the immunity challenge.)		Anders	6-1	Sent to Duel; Day 36
Episode 16	8 December 2025	None		Andreas	4-2	Sent to Duel; Day 37
Episode 16	8 December 2025	None		Anders	0	Lost Duel; Day 37
Episode 17	15 December 2025	Tanja		Andreas	0	Lost Challenge; Day 38
Episode 17	15 December 2025	Anton		Tore	0	Ejected; Day 39
Episode 17	15 December 2025	Line		Dennis	0	Lost Duel; Day 40
Episode 17	15 December 2025			Line		2nd Runner-up; Day 41
Episode 17	15 December 2025			Tanja		Runner-up; Day 41
Episode 17	15 December 2025			Anton		Robinson; Day 41
Episode 18	16 December 2025	Reunion & Talk Show				

== Voting History ==
#	Original Tribes	Post-Loser's Island							Switched Tribes			Merged Tribe							
Episode	1	3		4		5		6	7	8	10	11			12	13		14	15
Day	1	3	6	9	10		12	15	17	20	22	24	25		28	30	31	34	36
Voted out	Dennis, Maria, Sanne, Trine	Robert	Sanne	Maria	Mathilde	Maria	Mathilde	Henrik	Katrine	Kira	René	Irene	Anton	Irene	Marco	Trine	Sheila	Alexander	Anders
Votes	0	0	8-1 (Note: As Loser's of Loser's Island, only Sanne and Maria could be voted for.)	0	7-3	0	9-1	6-1	4-2-1	5-3	0	0	5-4-2-1	0	7-3-2	0	7-1-1	9-4	6-1
Voter	Vote																		
Anton	5th		Sanne					Henrik	Kira	Kira			Sheila	Won	Anders (x2)		Sheila	Alexander	Anders
Tanja	3rd		Sanne					Henrik					Sheila		Marco		Sheila	Alexander	Anders
Line	7th		Sanne					Henrik					Sheila		Marco		Sheila	Alexander	Anders
Dennis	10th			Won	Mathilde		Mathilde		Katrine	Kira			Trine		Marco		Sheila	Alexander	Anders
Tore	2nd				Mathilde		Mathilde						Anton		Marco		Anton	Alexander	Anders
Andreas	2nd		Sanne					Henrik					Sheila		Anders		Sheila	Alexander	Anders
Anders	8th				Mathilde		Mathilde				Won	Won	Anton		Marco		Sheila	Alexander	Andreas
Alexander	1st				Mathilde		Mathilde						Anton		None		Sheila	Anders	
Sheila	3rd				Dennis		Mathilde		Katrine	Kira			Anton		Tore (x2)		Dennis		
Trine	10th				Mathilde		Mathilde		Katrine	Kira			Dennis		Marco				
Marco	5th				Mathilde		Mathilde						Anton		Marco				
Irene	6th				Dennis		Mathilde		Katrine	Kira	Won	Lost	Trine	Lost					
René	7th				Mathilde		Mathilde				Lost								
Kira	8th		Sanne					Henrik	Irene	Trine									
Katrine	4th		Sanne					Henrik	Kira										
Henrik	1st		Sanne					Kira											
Mathilde	4th				Dennis	Won	Anders												
Maria	9th		Sanne	Lost		Lost													
Sanne	9th		Maria																
Robert	6th																		
Penalty Votes										Trine (x2) (Note: Although Trine won the duel against Marco, because her tribe lost the immunity challenge, the penalty votes went to her instead.)								Alexander (x2); Anders (x3)	
