= Per Røntved =

Danish footballer (1949–2023)

Personal information
- Full name: Per Christian Røntved
- Date of birth: 27 January 1949
- Place of birth: Frederiksberg, Denmark
- Date of death: 16 May 2023 (aged 74)
- Height: 1.86 m (6 ft 1 in)
- Position: Defender

Senior career*
Years	Team	Apps	(Gls)
1967–1972	Brønshøj BK	116	(48)
1972–1979	Werder Bremen	194	(40)
1979–1982	Randers Freja	114	(29)
1983	Hvidovre IF	15	

International career
1970–1971	Denmark U21	3	(0)
1970–1982	Denmark	75	(11)
- * Club domestic league appearances and goals

Per Christian Røntved (27 January 1949 – 16 May 2023) was a Danish professional footballer who played for German club Werder Bremen from 1972 to 1979. He also played for Danish clubs Brønshøj BK, Randers Freja, and Hvidovre IF. He was named 1972 Danish Player of the Year, and was the first to earn 75 caps for the Denmark national team, doing so from 1970 to 1982.

== Club career ==
Born at Frederiksberg in Copenhagen, Røntved started his club career at local club Brønshøj Boldklub. He made his senior debut as a left winger at the age of 18, and played alongside his footballing idol Erik Nielsen at Brønshøj. He was eventually moved back to the defender position to cover for injuries in the Brønshøj team. He helped the club win promotion for the top-flight Danish 1st Division in 1969. Having participated in the 1972 Summer Olympics, Røntved moved abroad to play professionally for Werder Bremen in the Bundesliga.

At Werder Bremen, he played alongside fellow Danish international John Danielsen, under German manager Sepp Piontek. Røntved played seven seasons at Werder Bremen, first as a midfielder, but he eventually settled as a libero. He was known for his good humour in the dressing room, and was chosen as Werder Bremen team captain for a number of games. As Werder was not a rich club, the notion that they could always "Sell Røntved" (German: Verkauf Röntved) if they needed money was popularized. According to new Werder manager Otto Rehhagel, Røntved was the next best libero in the World, second only to Franz Beckenbauer. He was expected to replace Beckenbauer at Bayern Munich in 1977, but Røntved chose to stay with Werder. He played 194 games and scored 40 goals for Werder in the Bundesliga until June 1979.

Røntved moved back to Denmark in 1979, to play for Randers Freja in the second-tier Danish 2nd Division. He played three-and-a-half years with the club, which was relegated to the 3rd Division in his last year with the team. He played his last active year in Denmark with 1st Division club Hvidovre IF in 1983.

== International career ==
Røntved made his debut for the Denmark national team in June 1970, while playing at Brønshøj. He also played three games for the Denmark under-21 team from October 1970 to May 1971. He started his international career as a left winger, but was a central defender and team captain in the Danish team at the 1972 Summer Olympics in Munich. He played six games at the tournament, and scored a single goal against Brazil. After the 1972 Olympics, he won the 1972 Danish Player of the Year award.

While at Werder Bremen, he eventually became the permanent Danish international team captain, and in May 1979, he became the sixth Dane to play 50 national team games. He was influential in Sepp Piontek becoming Danish national team manager in 1979, when he recommended his former Werder team-mate and manager for the job. When he moved back to Randers in the summer 1979, Sepp Piontek dropped him from the national team after his 51st national team game. Piontek re-called him to the national team in June 1980, and Røntved went on to play another 24 national team matches.

Røntved broke Henning Munk Jensen's 1978 record of 62 national team games in August 1981. He became the first Dane to reach 75 national team matches in his last national team game in November 1982, a Danish record until broken by Morten Olsen in 1985. He was selected team captain in 38 of his national team matches, breaking Ole Madsen's record of 25, another record which Morten Olsen broke in 1987.

== Personal life ==
Per Røntved was the older brother of former professional footballer Kim Røntved. He was married and had two kids. When he moved back to Denmark in 1979, he opened a sporting goods store in Randers. In 1979, he also published his memoirs, which caused great controversy for its outspoken description and criticism of the life as a professional footballer.

Røntved planned to wind down his football career by playing in the United States, but was stopped abruptly in June 1984. During a rope jumping challenge with his brother, Per suffered from a cerebral hemorrhage, resulting in paralysis of the left side of his body. He recovered, and was involved in the management of several smaller Danish football clubs, and served as a technical advisor for the National Football Association of Swaziland. He also became a popular motivational speaker.

Røntved died after a struggle with cancer on 16 May 2023, at the age of 74.

== Honours ==
Individual

- 1972 Danish Player of the Year
- Denmark's Hall of Fame

== Bibliography ==
- "Fodbold på vrangen", Politiken, 1979, ISBN 87-567-3242-2
