= Robinson Ekspeditionen 2024 =

- Season 25
- Presented by: Jakob Kjeldbjerg
- No. of days: 42
- No. of castaways: 24
- Winner: Nicolaj Schrøder
- Runners-up: Sebastian Sisbo; Helle Pultz
- Location: Langkawi, Malaysia

Release
- Original network: TV3
- Original release: September 2 – December 2, 2024

Season chronology
- ← Previous; 2023 Next → 2025

Robinson Ekspeditionen 2024 is the twenty-fifth season of the Danish reality television series Robinson Ekspeditionen. The season returns to Malaysia where 24 contestants, for the first time are divided into four tribes. Competing for food, immunity and the grand prize of 500,000kr. and be crowned Robinson 2024. The season premieres on 2 September 2024 on TV3. The season concluced on 2 December 2024 where Nicolaj Schrøder won in the final challenge against Sebastian Sisbo and Helle Pultz to win the grand prize and be crowned Robinson 2024.

== Contestants ==
Notable cast members includes Adam Rimann Sandgaard and Francesca Elisabeth Kanu, contestants on Bachelorette & Bachelor respectively. Former Big Brother contestant Ginna Bennet, and former For lækker til love and Paradise Hotel contestants Marc Ciano and Monique Kromann.

List of Robinson Ekspeditionen 2024 contestants
Contestant	Original Tribe	Switched Tribe	Post-Duel Tribe	Merged Tribe	Finish
Anne Roy; 34, Odense	Purple Team				1st Voted Out; Day 4
Marc Ciano Marra; 38, Hellerup	Purple Team				Medically evacuated Day 6
Francesca Elisabeth Kanu; 37, Herlev	Purple Team				2nd Voted Out; Day 7
Carsten Dichmann Ludvigsen; 50, Odense	Purple Team				Lost Challenge; Day 8
Martin "Junior" Brandt Christensen; 40, Rødovre	Green Team	North Team			Medically evacuated Day 10
Ginna Bennet; 35, Greve Strand	Orange Team	North Team			3rd Voted Out; Day 10
Thor Jørgensen; 35, Rødekro	Orange Team	South Team			Quit due to Injury; Day 12
Monique Kromann; Returned to Game	Green Team	North Team			4th Voted Out; Day 13
Frederik Skov; 46, Solrød Strand	Orange Team	South Team			Lost Duel; Day 13
Adam Rimann Sandgaard; 26, Copenhagen	Blue Team	South Team	South Team		5th Voted Out; Day 16
Dana T. Myrvig; 28, Brøndby Strand	Green Team	South Team	South Team		Lost Duel; Day 18
Sheema Karimi; 25, Vanløse	Blue Team	South Team	South Team		6th Voted Out; Day 19
Jesper Hansen Eghjort; 40, Brøndby Strand	Blue Team	South Team	South Team		Medically evacuated 1st Jury Member; Day 22
Vibeke Lund Hagensen; 42, Strandby	Blue Team	South Team	South Team		7th Voted Out; 2nd Jury Member; Day 26
Luna Sofie Lagoni Jeppesen; 29, Odense	Blue Team	South Team	South Team	Robinson	8th Voted Out; 3rd Jury Member; Day 30
Camilla Schrøder; 27, Valby	Purple Team	South Team	South Team	Robinson	9th Voted Out; 4th Jury Member; Day 33
Susanne Hoe; 49, Kolding	Green Team	North Team	North Team	Robinson	Lost Duel; 5th Jury Member; Day 34
Monique Kromann; 31, Vejle	Green Team	North Team	North Team	Robinson	10th Voted Out; 6th Jury Member; Day 35
Stefanie Nielsen; 32, Klarup	Orange Team	North Team	North Team	Robinson	11th Voted Out; Day 39
Morten Grabowski Kjær; 44, Aalborg	Purple Team	South Team	South Team	Robinson	Lost Duel; Day 39
Ali Jahouh; 29, Nørrebro	Green Team	North Team	North Team	Robinson	Lost Challenge; Day 40
Hadi Ismail; 32, Brøndby Strand	Blue Team	North Team	South Team	Robinson	Lost Challenge; Day 41
Helle Pultz; 57, Esbjerg	Orange Team	North Team	North Team	Robinson	2nd Runner-up; Day 42
Sebastian Sisbo; 29, Copenhagen	Green Team	North Team	North Team	Robinson	Runner-up; Day 42
Nicolaj Schrøder; 25, Valby	Orange Team	North Team	North Team	Robinson	Robinson; Day 42

== Season summary ==
Episode	Air date	Challenges		Eliminated	Vote	Finish
Episode	Air date	Reward	Immunity	Eliminated	Vote	Finish
Episode 1	2 September 2024	Green Team		Anne	11-1	1st Voted Out; Day 4
Episode 1	2 September 2024	Orange Team		Anne	11-1	1st Voted Out; Day 4
Episode 2	9 September 2024	Blue Team		Marc	0	Medically evacuated Day 6
Episode 2	9 September 2024		Green Team	Francesca	9-1	2nd Voted Out; Day 7
Episode 3	16 September 2024	Adam	South Team	Carsten	0	Lost Challenge; Day 8
Episode 3	16 September 2024	Monique	South Team	Junior	0	Medically evacuated Day 10
Episode 3	16 September 2024	Monique	South Team	Ginna	8-1	3rd Voted Out; Day 10
Episode 4	23 September 2024	North Team	South Team	Thor	0	Quit due to Injury; Day 12
Episode 4	23 September 2024	North Team	South Team	Monique	6-2 (Note: After the votes were read Monique, receiving the most votes, was able to choose a tribemate to compete in an elimination duel. She chose Frederik.)	4th Voted Out; Day 13
Episode 5	30 September 2024	North Team	North Team	Frederik	Duel	Lost Duel; Day 13
Episode 5	30 September 2024	North Team	North Team	Adam	7-2	5th Voted Out; Day 16
Episode 6	7 October 2024	North Team	~~Monique~~; Hadi (Note: Although Monique won individual immunity after the duel, Hadi used an advantage stealer to take the individual immunity for himself.)	Dana	0	Lost Duel; Day 18
Episode 6	7 October 2024	North Team	North Team	Sheema	6-1	6th Voted Out; Day 19
Episode 7	14 October 2024	Nicolaj, Sebastian, Stefanie, Monique		Jesper	0	Medically evacuated 1st Jury Member; Day 22
Episode 8	21 October 2024	Sebastian, [Camilla, Luna] Susanne	Monique	Vibeke	9-3	7th Voted Out; 2nd Jury Member; Day 26
Episode 9	28 October 2024	Sebastian, [Hadi, Morten]	Nicolaj	Luna	9-4-1	8th Voted Out; 3rd Jury Member; Day 30
Episode 10	4 November 2024	Sebastian, [Ali, Helle]	Ali	Camilla	10-1	9th Voted Out; 4th Jury Member; Day 33
Episode 11	11 November 2024	Robinson Auction; Stefanie	Hadi	Susanne	0	Lost Duel; 5th Jury Member; Day 34
Episode 11	11 November 2024	Robinson Auction; Stefanie	Hadi	Monique	7-2-2-1	10th Voted Out; 6th Jury Member; Day 35
Episode 12	18 November 2024	Helle				None (Note: This episode consisted entirely of challenges to see who would be safe from the upcoming tribal council, which took place in the following episode.)
Episode 12	18 November 2024	Morten				None
Episode 12	18 November 2024	Hadi				None
Episode 13	25 November 2024			Stefanie	8-4-1	11th Voted Out; Day 39
Episode 14	2 December 2024					Lost Challenge; Day 40

== Voting history ==
#	Original Tribe				Switched Tribe					Post-Duel Tribe			Merged Tribe						
Episode	1	2		3			4		5		6		7	8	9	10	11		13
Voted out	Anne	Marc	Francesca	Carsten	Junior	Ginna	Thor	Monique	Frederik	Adam	Dana	Sheema	Jesper	Vibeke	Luna	Camilla	Susanne	Monique	
Votes	11-1	0	9-1	1	No vote	8-1	No vote	6-2	No vote	7-2	No vote	6-1	No vote	9-3	9-4-1	10-1	No vote	7-2-2-1	
Ali						Ginna		Monique						Vibeke	Luna	Camilla		Monique	
Hadi	Anne					Ginna		Helle		Adam		Sheema		Vibeke	Luna	Camilla		Monique	Safe
Helle			Francesca			Ginna		Monique						Vibeke	Luna	Camilla		Monique	Safe
Morten	Anne		Francesca							Adam		Sheema		Vibeke	Sebastian	Camilla		Monique	Safe
Nicolaj			Francesca			Ginna		Monique						Vibeke	Luna	Camilla		Monique	
Sebastian						Ginna		Monique						Vibeke	Luna	Camilla		Monique	
Stefanie			Francesca			Ginna		Monique						Vibeke	Luna	Camilla	Won	Monique	
Monique				Lost		Ginna		Helle	Won		Won			Sebastian	Sebastian	None		Morten	
Susanne						Ginna		Monique						Sebastian	Luna	Camilla	Lost		
Camilla	Anne		Francesca							Adam		Sheema		Vibeke	Sebastian	Monique			
Luna	Anne									Adam		Sheema		Vibeke	Sebastian				
Vibeke	Anne									Adam		Sheema		Sebastian					
Jesper	Anne									Adam		Sheema	Evacuated						
Sheema	Anne									Dana		Vibeke							
Dana										Adam	Lost								
Adam	Anne			Carsten						Dana									
Frederik			Francesca						Lost										
Thor			Francesca	Lost			Evacuated												
Ginna			Francesca			Susanne													
Junior					Evacuated														
Carsten	Anne		Francesca	Lost															
Francesca	Anne		Ginna																
Marc	Anne	Evacuated																	
Anne	Vibeke																		
Penalty Votes															Luna (x2); Susanne	Camilla		Ali (x2); Helle (x2)	
