= Danish Football Player of the Year =

Annual Danish football award

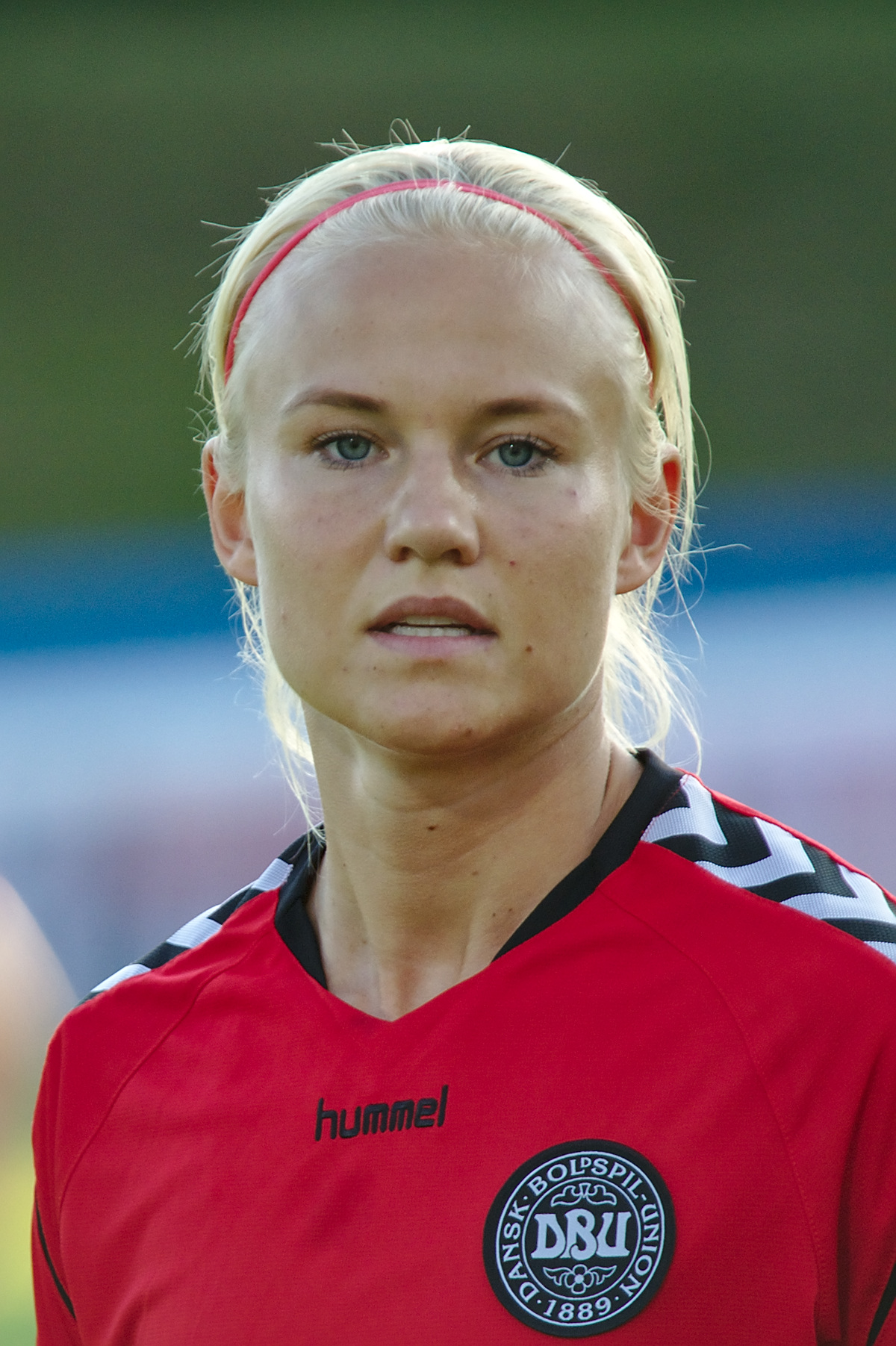
Pernille Harder, record award winner

The Danish Player of the Year award is an annual prize, which has been given to the best male Danish football player by the Danish Football Association since 1963. The winner is decided in a vote among the professional Danish footballers. Since 2000, there has also been an award for the top female player. The winner is decided by a vote among all Elitedivisionen players.

Jens Petersen was the first player to win the award in 1963. In 1975, Henning Munk Jensen became the first player to win the prize for a second time. Up until 1978, the Danish Football Association's rule of amateurism meant only players in the domestic league could win the prize. Even after the emergence of paid football in Denmark in 1978, no players in foreign clubs were eligible for the award - this was in part the reason why 1977 European Footballer of the Year striker Allan Simonsen didn't win the award, as he played abroad from 1972 to 1983. When the award was finally opened to all Danish players in 1983, national team captain Morten Olsen was the first player to win the award.

The record title holder is Pernille Harder, who has nine honours. The male record holder is Christian Eriksen, with five awards. Brøndby IF is the football club with most players selected for the award.

== Winners ==
=== Men ===
- 1961 Harald Nielsen, Frederikshavn/Bologna
- 1963 Jens Petersen, Esbjerg
- 1964 Ole Madsen, HIK
- 1965 Kaj Poulsen, Vejle
- 1966 Leif Nielsen, Frem
- 1967 Johnny Hansen, Vejle
- 1968 Henning Munk Jensen, AaB
- 1969 Allan Michaelsen, B 1903
- 1970 Jan Larsen, AB
- 1971 Birger Pedersen, Hvidovre
- 1972 Per Røntved, Brønshøj
- 1973 Hans Aabech, Hvidovre
- 1974 Niels-Christian Holmstrøm, KB
- 1975 Henning Munk Jensen (2), AaB
- 1976 Flemming Ahlberg, Frem
- 1977 Allan Hansen, OB
- 1978 Ole Kjær, Esbjerg
- 1979 Jens Jørn Bertelsen, Esbjerg
- 1980 Lars Bastrup, AGF
- 1981 Allan Hansen (2), OB
- 1982 Michael Laudrup, Brøndby
- 1983 Morten Olsen, Anderlecht
- 1984 Preben Elkjær, Hellas Verona
- 1985 Michael Laudrup (2), Juventus
- 1986 Morten Olsen (2), 1. FC Köln
- 1987 John 'Faxe' Jensen, Brøndby
- 1988 Lars Olsen, Brøndby
- 1989 Brian Laudrup, Brøndby/Bayer Uerdingen
- 1990 Peter Schmeichel, Brøndby
- 1991 Kim Vilfort, Brøndby
- 1992 Brian Laudrup (2), Bayern Munich/Fiorentina
- 1993 Peter Schmeichel (2), Manchester United
- 1994 Thomas Helveg, Udinese
- 1995 Brian Laudrup (3), Rangers
- 1996 Allan Nielsen, Brøndby/Tottenham Hotspur
- 1997 Brian Laudrup (4), Rangers
- 1998 Ebbe Sand, Brøndby
- 1999 Peter Schmeichel (3), Manchester United
- 2000 René Henriksen, Panathinaikos
- 2001 Ebbe Sand (2), Schalke 04
- 2002 Jon Dahl Tomasson, Feyenoord/Milan
- 2003 Morten Wieghorst, Brøndby
- 2004 Jon Dahl Tomasson (2), Milan
- 2005 Christian Poulsen, Schalke 04
- 2006 Christian Poulsen (2), Schalke 04/Sevilla
- 2007 Daniel Agger, Liverpool
- 2008 Martin Laursen, Aston Villa
- 2009 Simon Kjær, Palermo
- 2010 William Kvist, Copenhagen
- 2011 William Kvist (2), VfB Stuttgart
- 2012 Daniel Agger (2), Liverpool
- 2013 Christian Eriksen, Ajax/Tottenham Hotspur
- 2014 Christian Eriksen (2), Tottenham Hotspur
- 2015 Christian Eriksen (3), Tottenham Hotspur
- 2016 Kasper Schmeichel, Leicester City
- 2017 Christian Eriksen (4), Tottenham Hotspur
- 2018 Christian Eriksen (5), Tottenham Hotspur
- 2019 Kasper Schmeichel (2), Leicester City
- 2020 Kasper Schmeichel (3), Leicester City
- 2021 Simon Kjær (2), Milan
- 2022 Pierre-Emile Højbjerg, Tottenham Hotspur
- 2023 Andreas Christensen, Barcelona
- 2024 Morten Hjulmand, Sporting
- 2025 Victor Froholdt, Copenhagen/FC Porto

=== Women ===
- 2000 Gitte Krogh, OB
- 2001 Christine Bonde, Fortuna Hjørring
- 2002 Heidi Johansen, OB
- 2003 Anne Dot Eggers Nielsen, Skovbakken
- 2004 Cathrine Paaske-Sørensen, Brøndby
- 2005 Merete Pedersen, Torres
- 2006 Cathrine Paaske-Sørensen (2), Brøndby
- 2007 Katrine S. Pedersen, Asker Fotball
- 2008 Mariann Gajhede, Fortuna Hjørring
- 2009 Mia Brogaard, Brøndby
- 2010 Line Røddik Hansen, Tyresö
- 2011 Sanne Troelsgaard Nielsen, Skovbakken
- 2012 Pernille Harder, Linköping
- 2013 Katrine S. Pedersen (2), Stabæk
- 2014 Simone Boye Sørensen, Brøndby
- 2015 Pernille Harder (2), Linköping
- 2016 Pernille Harder (3), Linköping
- 2017 Pernille Harder (4), VfL Wolfsburg
- 2018 Pernille Harder (5), VfL Wolfsburg
- 2019 Pernille Harder (6), VfL Wolfsburg
- 2020 Pernille Harder (7), VfL Wolfsburg/ Chelsea
- 2021 Signe Bruun, Lyon
- 2022 Stine Ballisager Pedersen, Vålerenga
- 2023 Amalie Vangsgaard, Paris Saint-Germain
- 2024 Pernille Harder (8), Bayern Munich
- 2025 Pernille Harder (9), Bayern Munich

== Danish Football Association's award ==
Since 2006 the Danish Football Association, in association with the TV-station TV2, has also given an award to the best football player in Denmark. The winner of the award is announced at the annual award show called Dansk Fodbold Award.

The past winners of DBUs "Danish player of the year".

- 2006 Christian Poulsen, Schalke 04/Sevilla
- 2007 Dennis Rommedahl, Ajax
- 2008 Martin Laursen, Aston Villa
- 2009 Nicklas Bendtner, Arsenal
- 2010 Dennis Rommedahl, Ajax/Olympiacos
- 2011 Christian Eriksen, Ajax
- 2012 Daniel Agger, Liverpool
- 2013 Christian Eriksen, Ajax/Tottenham Hotspur
- 2014 Christian Eriksen, Tottenham Hotspur
- 2015 Kasper Schmeichel, Leicester City
- 2016 Kasper Schmeichel, Leicester City
- 2017 Christian Eriksen, Tottenham Hotspur
- 2018 Kasper Schmeichel, Leicester City
- 2019 Kasper Schmeichel, Leicester City
- 2020 Pierre-Emile Højbjerg, Tottenham Hotspur
- 2021 Simon Kjær, AC Milan
- 2022 Pierre-Emile Højbjerg, Tottenham Hotspur
- 2023 Andreas Christensen, Barcelona
- 2024 Morten Hjulmand, Sporting
- 2025 Victor Froholdt, Copenhagen/FC Porto

== Young Players of the Year ==
Sponsored by Arla Foods, the awards were initially known as Mælkens talentpriser (the milk's talent awards) in order to promote the line of dairy products of the company then known as "MD Foods". DBU found new sponsor DONG (later DONG Energy), an oil company, in 2004 but Arla went on to sponsor the prize which was renamed Arla's talentpriser (Arla's talent awards) in 2005.

Year	U/21	U/19	U/17
1987	*Johnny Mølby, Vejle	Anders Maibom, B 1909	Diego Tur, B 1903
1988	*Henrik Risom, Vejle	Jens Madsen, Brøndby	Ronnie Ekelund, Brøndby
1989	*Brian Steen Nielsen, Vejle	Jacob Laursen, Vejle	Jeppe Tengbjerg, KB
1990	Steen Nedergaard, Odense	*Martin & *Michael Johansen KB	Kenni Sommer, Silkeborg
1991	*Miklos Molnar, Servette	Christian Duus, Silkeborg	Jesper Søgaard, Vejle
1992	*Jakob Kjeldbjerg, Silkeborg	Thomas Jensen, AaB	Simon Karkov, Esbjerg
1993	*Jesper Kristensen, Brøndby	*Ulrik Laursen, Odense	Michael Kremer, Brøndby
1994	*Thomas Rytter, Lyngby	*Jon Dahl Tomasson, Køge	Carsten Lektonen, Odense
1995	*Niclas Jensen, Lyngby	*Jesper Grønkjær, AaB	Dan Anton Johansen, Brøndby
1996	*Martin Jørgensen, AGF Aarhus	Stefan K. Hansen, Copenhagen	*Kasper Bøgelund, Odense
1997	*Ole Tobiasen, Ajax	*Lars Jacobsen, Odense	Jesper Håkansson, Frem
1998	Mikkel Jensen, Brøndby	*Peter Løvenkrands, AB	Tom Christensen, AGF Aarhus
1999	Christian Magleby, Lyngby	*Hjalte Bo Nørregaard, Copenhagen	Claus Pedersen, Odense
2000	*Martin Albrechtsen, AB	Allan Olesen, Brøndby	Martin Bergvold, KB
2001	*Christian Poulsen, Copenhagen	*Rasmus Würtz, Skive	*Kasper Lorentzen, Brøndby
2002	*Jan Kristiansen, Esbjerg	Jeppe Curth, Feyenoord	*Michael Jakobsen, B 93
2003	*Stephan Andersen, AB	*Morten "Duncan" Rasmussen, AGF Aarhus	Lasse Qvist, Lyngby
2004	*Thomas Kahlenberg, Brøndby	Søren Christensen, Nykøbing FA	*Nicklas Bendtner, Arsenal
2005	*Daniel Agger, Liverpool	Magnus Troest, Midtjylland	Rasmus Christiansen, Lyngby
2006	*Niki Zimling, Esbjerg	*Mike Jensen, Brøndby	Mads Albæk, Midtjylland
2007	*Kasper Schmeichel, Manchester City	*Simon Kjær, Midtjylland	Nikola Saric, Herfølge
2008	*Michael Lumb, AGF Aarhus	*Mathias "Zanka" Jørgensen, Copenhagen	*Christian Eriksen, OB
2009	*Anders Randrup, Brøndby	*Thomas Delaney, Copenhagen	Niels Bisp Rasmussen, Vejle
2010	*Jonas Lössl, Midtjylland	*Jannik Vestergaard, Hoffenheim	Kenneth Zohore, Copenhagen
2011	*Nicolai Boilesen, Ajax	*Uffe Manich Bech, Lyngby	*Pierre-Emile Højbjerg, Brøndby
2012	*Jores Okore, FC Nordsjælland	*Viktor Fischer, Ajax	*Andreas Christensen, Chelsea
2013	*Andreas Cornelius, Copenhagen	Andrew Hjulsager, Brøndby	Daniel Iversen, Esbjerg
2014	*Yussuf Poulsen, RB Leipzig	**Joachim Andersen, Twente	Mark Brink Christensen, Esbjerg
2015	Jeppe Højbjerg, Esbjerg	Mikkel Duelund, FC Midtjylland	Nicklas Strunck, FC Nordsjælland
2016	*Marcus Ingvartsen, FC Nordsjælland	*Jacob Bruun Larsen, Borussia Dortmund	Victor Jensen, FC København

(*) Players who have played at least one match for the senior national team.

== See also ==
- Danish Football Hall of Fame
- Danish Football Manager of the Year
- Danish Sports Name of the Year
