= Robinson Ekspeditionen 2022 =

- Season 23
- Presented by: Jakob Kjeldbjerg
- No. of days: 44
- No. of castaways: 21
- Winner: Mikkel Bertelsen
- Runners-up: David Martin Tegam Bækhøj; Naja Anna Stencel
- Location: Langkawi, Malaysia

Release
- Original network: TV3
- Original release: September 12 – December 5, 2022

Season chronology
- ← Previous; 2021 Next → 2023

Robinson Ekspeditionen 2022 is the twenty-third season of the Danish reality television series Robinson Ekspeditionen. Jakob Kjeldbjerg returns as host as the season marks a return to Malaysia where 21 Danes compete for a chance to win 500,000kr. and be crowned Robinson 2022. The season airs on TV3 premiering on 12 September 2022.

== Contestants ==
Notable cast members includes Majbrit Watt, wife of racecar driver Jason Watt, Doaa Zaher, an Instagram influencer and Loay Zeraiq, who appears in the TV 2 Zulu show, Kørelærerne.

List of Robinson Ekspeditionen 2022 contestants
Contestant	Original Tribe	Post-Duel Tribe	Swapped Tribe	Merged Tribe	Finish
Majbrit Watt; 49, Herlev	North Team				1st Voted Out; Day 4
Doaa Zaher; 26, Copenhagen	North Team				2nd Voted Out; Day 7
Mohammed Walid; 29, Hvidovre	North Team	North Team			3rd Voted Out; Day 10
Michelle Boll; 37, Kalundborg	North Team	North Team			4th Voted Out; Day 13
Nicolai Reitan Boas; 36, Copenhagen	South Team	South Team			5th Voted Out; Day 17
Isabella Tvede; 23, Islands Brygge	South Team	South Team	North Team		6th Voted Out; Day 21
Mariam Said; 29, Brøndby Strand	South Team	South Team	North Team		Medically Evacuated; Day 22
Kia Skou Jensen; 36, Slagelse	South Team	South Team	North Team		7th Voted Out; Day 23
Morten Øgaard; 51, Borup	North Team	South Team	South Team	Robinson	Lost Duel; 1st Jury Member; Day 25
Frederik Ingolf Lundberg; 34, Copenhagen	South Team	North Team	North Team	Robinson	8th Voted Out; 2nd Jury Member; Day 26
Jacob Hanfgarn; 26, Odense	North Team	North Team	North Team	Robinson	9th Voted Out; 3rd Jury Member; Day 30
Sine Kromann Larsen; 26, Odense	South Team	South Team	South Team	Robinson	Lost Duel; 4th Jury Member; Day 34
Vicky Due; 39, Køge	South Team	South Team	South Team	Robinson	Lost Duel; 5th Jury Member; Day 36
Lukas Bach; 22, Copenhagen	North Team	North Team	North Team	Robinson	10th Voted Out; 6th Jury Member; Day 38
Mie Rasmussen; 34, Kastrup	North Team	North Team	North Team	Robinson	11th Voted Out; 7th Jury Member; Day 40
Emil Honoré Andresen; 24, Fredericia	South Team	South Team	South Team	Robinson	12th Voted Out; Day 41
Loay Zeraiq; 41, Odense	South Team	South Team	South Team	Robinson	Lost Challenge; Day 42
Brian Kristensen; 52, Holstebro	North Team	North Team	South Team	Robinson	Lost Challenge; Day 43
Naja Anna Stencel; 19, Valby	North Team	North Team	North Team	Robinson	2nd Runner-up; Day 44
David Martin Tegam Bækhøj; 26, Aarhus	South Team	South Team	South Team	Robinson	Runner-up; Day 44
Mikkel Bertelsen; 47, Kirke Hyllinge	South Team	South Team	South Team	Robinson	Robinson; Day 44

== Season summary ==
Episode	Air date	Challenges		Eliminated	Vote	Finish
Episode	Air date	Reward	Immunity	Eliminated	Vote	Finish
Episode 1	12 September 2022	South Team	South Team	Majbrit	9-2-1 (Note: Lukas competed in a duel and lost. As a result, he was given two votes at tribal council.)	1st Voted Out; Day 4
Episode 2	19 September 2022	South Team	South Team	Doaa	6-3; Duel (Note: After Doaa was voted out, she competed against Kia (who North Team sent to the duel). Doaa lost and was permanently eliminated.)	2nd Voted Out; Day 7
Episode 3	26 September 2022	South Team	South Team	Mohammed	6-2	3rd Voted Out; Day 10
Episode 4	3 October 2022	South Team	South Team	Michelle	6-2-1	4th Voted Out; Day 13
Episode 5	10 October 2022	South Team	North Team	Nicolai	7-4	5th Voted Out; Day 17
Episode 6	17 October 2022	South Team	South Team	Isabella	7-1	6th Voted Out; Day 21
Episode 7	24 October 2022	South Team	South Team	Mariam	0	Medically Evacuated; Day 22
Episode 7	24 October 2022	South Team	South Team	Kia	5-1	7th Voted Out; Day 23
Episode 8	31 October 2022	North Team	?	Morten	0	Lost Duel; 1st Jury Member; Day 25
Episode 8	31 October 2022	North Team	?	Frederik	9-2	8th Voted Out; 2nd Jury Member; Day 26
Episode 9	7 November 2022					9th Voted Out; Day TBD

== Voting history ==
#	Original Tribe		Post-Duel Tribe			Swapped Tribe				
Episode	1	2	3	4	5	6	7		8	9
Voted out	Majbrit	Doaa	Mohammed	Michelle	Nicolai	Isabella	Mariam	Kia	Frederik	
Votes	9-2-1	6-3; Duel	6-2	6-2-1	7-4	7-1	0	5-1	4-1	
Brian	Majbrit	?	Mohammed	Michelle						
David					?					
Emil					?					
Jacob	Majbrit	?	Mohammed	Michelle		Isabella		Kia	Frederik	
Loay					?					
Lukas	Majbrit	?	Mohammed	Michelle		Isabella		Kia	Frederik	
Mie	Majbrit	?	Naja	Michelle		Isabella		Kia	Frederik	
Mikkel					?					
Morten	Majbrit	?			?					
Naja	Majbrit	Doaa	Mohammed	Michelle		Isabella		Kia	Frederik	
Sine					Isabella					
Vicky					?					
Frederik			Mohammed	Michelle		Isabella		Kia	Naja	
Kia		Won			Nicolai	Isabella		Naja		
Mariam					Nicolai	Isabella				
Isabella					Nicolai	Naja				
Nicolai					Isabella					
Michelle	Majbrit	?	Mohammed	Mie						
Mohammed	Majbrit	?	Naja							
Doaa	Majbrit	Naja; Lost								
Majbrit	Morten									
Penalty Votes	Lukas (x2)			Lukas (x2)						
