= Jan Michaelsen =

Danish footballer (born 1970)

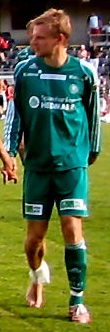
- Michaelsen with HamKam in 2007

Personal information
- Full name: Jan Munk Michaelsen
- Date of birth: 28 November 1970 (age 55)
- Place of birth: Nantes, France
- Height: 1.82 m (6 ft 0 in)
- Position: Midfielder

Team information
- Current team: Vancouver Whitecaps (assistant)

Senior career*
Years	Team	Apps	(Gls)
1990–1991	Svendborg		
1991–1993	Vanløse		
1993–1996	Hellerup		
1996–2001	AB	141	(20)
2001–2004	Panathinaikos	44	(3)
2004–2008	HamKam	72	(6)
Total		257	(29)

International career
2000–2003	Denmark	19	(1)

Managerial career
- 2009: FC Copenhagen Reserves
- 2009–2012: FC Copenhagen U17
- 2012–2016: Denmark U17
- 2018: Fremad Amager
- 2019: Vendsyssel FF (assistant)
- 2019–2022: Nykøbing FC (youth)
- 2022–2024: Denmark U20
- 2024–2025: Anderlecht (assistant)
- 2025–: Vancouver Whitecaps (assistant)
- * Club domestic league appearances and goals

Jan Munk Michaelsen (born 28 November 1970) is a former professional footballer, currently the assistant manager of Major League Soccer club Vancouver Whitecaps FC. Born in France, he represented Denmark at international level.

He is the son of former Danish footballer, the late Allan Michaelsen.

== Club career ==
Starting his career in lower-league Danish clubs, his first major club was AB, where he played 170 matches. He moved on to the Greek club Panathinaikos, for whom he played 100 matches, including numerous appearances in the Champions League. In July 2004, after winning The Double in Greece, he moved to Norwegian club HamKam.

From January 2009, Michaelsen was the head coach for F.C. Copenhagen's 2. Division team. In the 2009–10 season, he was the head coach of F.C. Copenhagen's U17-team. He succeeded Thomas Frank as head coach of the Denmark under-17 national team in 2012.

In March 2019, Michaelsen became assistant manager of Vendsyssel FF. He left the job at the end of June 2019 to become head of coaching at Nykøbing FC.

In November 2022, Michaelsen became manager of Danish national U20 team. He left the position in August 2024 to become assistant manager to Brian Riemer at RSC Anderlecht.

== International career ==
Between 2000 and 2003, Michaelsen played 19 international matches for the Denmark national team.

He scored his only goal for the national team in his seventh international match on 6 October 2001 in the 2002 World Cup qualifier against Iceland. He came off the bench to score the final goal of the match in the 90th minute, making it 6–0.

Michaelsen was included in Denmark's squad for the 2002 FIFA World Cup in Japan and South Korea, but did not play during the tournament.

== Honours ==
Akademisk Boldklub

- Danish Cup: 1998–99

Panathinaikos

- Alpha Ethniki: 2003–04
- Greek Football Cup: 2003–04

=== Manager ===
Vancouver Whitecaps

- Canadian Championship: 2025
- Western Conference (playoffs): 2025
