= Allan Michaelsen =

Danish footballer (1947–2016)

Personal information
- Full name: Allan Richard Michaelsen
- Date of birth: 2 November 1947
- Place of birth: Copenhagen, Denmark
- Date of death: 2 March 2016 (aged 68)
- Place of death: Denmark
- Position: Midfielder

Youth career
- 1958–1963: ØB
- 1963–1966: B 1903

Senior career*
Years	Team	Apps	(Gls)
1966–1969	B 1903		
1970–1972	Nantes	44	(3)
1972–1974	Eintracht Braunschweig	60	(4)
1974–1979	Chiasso		
1979–1981	Svendborg fB		(3)

International career
1968	Denmark U21	4	(0)
1969–1972	Denmark	8	(1)

Managerial career
- 1981–1982: Svendborg fB
- 1982–1984: Næstved
- 1984–1986: B 1909
- 1987–1988: Esbjerg fB
- 1989–1992: Svendborg fB
- 1992–1995: OB (assistant)
- 1995–1998: B 1909
- 1999–2000: Vejle
- 2004–2005: Nordsjælland (assistant)
- 2005–2006: AB
- * Club domestic league appearances and goals

Allan Richard Michaelsen (2 November 1947 – 2 March 2016) was a Danish football player and manager. He was voted Danish Football Player of the Year in 1969. He was the father of Jan Michaelsen.
