= Morten Olsen =

Danish footballer (born 1949)

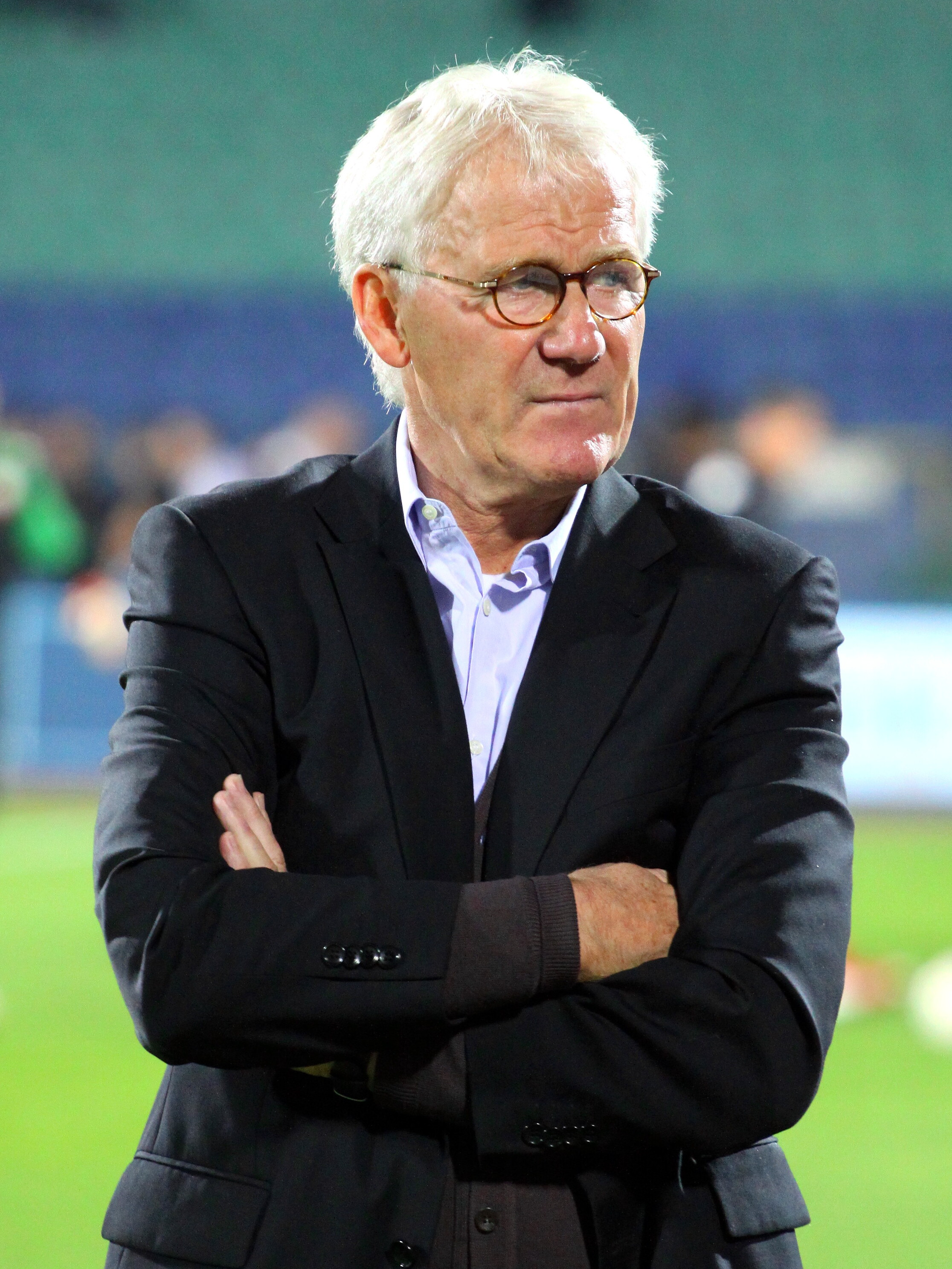
- Olsen in 2012

Personal information
- Full name: Morten Per Olsen
- Date of birth: 14 August 1949 (age 77)
- Place of birth: Vordingborg, Denmark
- Height: 1.83 m (6 ft 0 in)
- Positions: Sweeper; defensive midfielder

Youth career
- 1957–1969: Vordingborg

Senior career*
Years	Team	Apps	(Gls)
1970–1972	B 1901	40	(2)
1972–1976	Cercle Brugge	132	(8)
1976–1980	Racing White	106	(4)
1980–1986	Anderlecht	173	(2)
1986–1989	1. FC Köln	80	(2)
Total		531	(18)

International career^{‡}
1970–1974	Denmark U21	5	(1)
1970–1989	Denmark	102	(4)

Managerial career
- 1990–1992: Brøndby
- 1993–1995: 1. FC Köln
- 1997–1998: Ajax
- 2000–2015: Denmark
- * Club domestic league appearances and goals as of ‡ National team caps and goals as of

Morten Per Olsen (Danish pronunciation: [ˈmɒːtn̩ ˈoːl.sn̩]; born 14 August 1949) is a Danish former football manager and former player. He was the head coach of the Denmark national team for 15 years from 2000 until 2015, guiding Denmark to the 2002 FIFA World Cup, 2004 European Championship, 2010 FIFA World Cup and 2012 European Championship. He has also managed Brøndby to two Danish Superliga championships and Ajax to the Double of the 1998 Eredivisie championship and Dutch Cup trophy. He is one of only two persons ever in football, alongside Didier Deschamps, to achieve 100 national matches for his country both as player as well as coach.

In his active career, Olsen started as a striker but did not make a mark until he at age thirty moved back and played defensive midfielder and libero. He played professionally in Belgium and Germany, and won the 1983 UEFA Cup and three Belgian First Division championships with Anderlecht. Olsen played a total 102 matches and scored four goals for the Danish national team from 1970 to 1989, and was named 1983 and 1986 Danish Player of the Year. He captained the Danish national team in 50 games during the 1980s, and represented Denmark at the 1984 European Championship, 1986 FIFA World Cup, and 1988 European Championship. Towards the end of his active career, Olsen was characterized as the most important player in the history of Danish football.

== Playing career ==
=== Club career ===
Born in Vordingborg, Morten Olsen started playing youth football at the local club in 1957. He started his career playing as a right winger. In 1970, at 20 years of age, he was brought to B 1901 in the top-flight Danish 1st Division championship by coach Kurt "Nikkelaj" Nielsen. At B 1901, Olsen was moved from right winger to central midfielder, in order to accommodate another right winger in the squad.

Olsen played three seasons at B 1901, before he moved abroad to play professionally with Belgian club Cercle Brugge in 1972, who had been promoted to the top-flight Belgian First Division championship one year earlier. At Brugge, Olsen played alongside fellow Danish international Benny Nielsen, who had recommended Olsen to Brugge manager Urbain Braems. In Olsen's first year with the club, Cercle Brugge finished in eleventh place in the 1972–73 Belgian First Division and went on to establish itself in the mid-table. While at Brugge, Olsen was used as a multi-purpose player, playing every position except from goalkeeper. In 1976, Olsen moved to league rivals Molenbeek, who had won the 1974–75 Belgian First Division. Olsen joined Danish internationals Benny Nielsen and Kresten Bjerre at Molenbeek. His time at Molenbeek featured even better league results, and consistent finishes in the top third of the league.

In 1980, Olsen moved to 16-time Belgian champions Anderlecht, to play alongside Danish internationals Benny Nielsen and Kenneth Brylle. In his first year at Anderlecht, the club won the 1980–81 Belgian First Division, conceding only 24 goals in 34 games. It was for Olsen the first trophy of his senior career. He played six years at Anderlecht, winning three Belgian championships with the club, and he was eventually named Anderlecht team captain. During most of 1982, Olsen suffered from a severe shin injury, which prompted Anderlecht manager Tomislav Ivic to move him back from the midfield into the libero position. As the libero at Anderlecht, Olsen controlled an aggressive form of off-side trap, which had 3–4 players converge towards the ball-possessing player as the off-side trap was sprung, in order to prevent the ball-possessing player from countering the off-side by dribbling on his own.

Olsen was a part of the Anderlecht team which beat Portuguese team Porto and Spanish team Valencia, among others, to reach the final game of the international 1982–83 UEFA Cup tournament. Anderlecht faced Portuguese team Benfica in the final, and won 2–1 on aggregate score. Olsen was subsequently named 1983 Danish Player of the Year. Anderlecht also reached the 1983–84 UEFA Cup final against Tottenham Hotspur from England. Olsen scored a goal in the first leg, but missed his shot in the deciding penalty shoot-out which Tottenham won.

Aged 36 years old, Olsen left Anderlecht following the 1986 World Cup. He moved to Germany, to play for 1. FC Köln in the Bundesliga. While at Köln, Olsen was moved back to his previous defensive midfield position. He helped Köln reach third and second-place finishes in the 1987–88 and 1988–89 Bundesliga seasons respectively. Olsen played 80 games and scored two goals for Köln in the Bundesliga, before retiring from his active career in June 1989, 39 years of age.

=== International career ===
Olsen made his debut for the Denmark under-21 national team in September 1970, scoring a single goal in a 2–2 friendly match draw with the Poland U21 team. Three weeks later, he was called up for the senior Danish national team under the Austria national team manager Rudi Strittich, and Olsen made his national team debut in September 1970 against Norway. He played his first national team game as a right winger, but eventually settled as a defensive midfielder. He helped Denmark qualify for the 1972 Summer Olympics, but could not participate at the tournament, as he had signed a professional contract with Cercle Brugge beforehand.

While at Anderlecht, Olsen became the seventh Dane to play 50 games for the national team, in June 1981. For Olsen's 53rd national team game in April 1983, the Germany national team manager of Denmark, Sepp Piontek, named Olsen permanent national team captain, as Olsen replaced the retiring Per Røntved as both libero and team captain. Olsen played as an attacking libero, and had defensive midfielder Jens Jørn Bertelsen cover for him when he was on the attack. Olsen, alongside defender Søren Busk, persuaded Piontek to implement the aggressive off-side trap they practiced at Anderlecht.

Olsen captained the Danish team that qualified for the 1984 European Championship; Denmark's first international tournament participation since the 1972 Olympics. Denmark reached the semi-finals, before being eliminated by Spain in a penalty shootout. In October 1985, Olsen became the second Dane, after Per Røntved, to play 75 national team matches. He captained Denmark at the 1986 World Cup, Denmark's first World Cup participation, which ended in a second round defeat to Spain. Olsen's most noticeable effort at the tournament came in the 2–0 group stage win against West Germany. He took the ball from his own half and made an irresistible dribbling run that was only stopped by a foul in the West German penalty area, with Jesper Olsen scoring the 1–0 goal on the resulting penalty kick. Olsen was identified as one of the overall top performers at the World Cup, and he was subsequently named 1986 Danish Player of the Year.

While he was moved to a midfielder position at Köln, Olsen continued to play as a libero for Denmark. He captained Denmark at the 1988 European Championship, which ended in the preliminary group stage. During the tournament, Olsen proved too slow for the libero position, and was moved up as defensive midfielder, leaving the libero position for Lars Olsen. Morten Olsen ended his international career following the 1988 European Championship, having played 99 national team games, but was called up again 10 months later. Olsen became the first Dane to play 100 games for the national team in April 1989, before ending his national team career in June 1989. Olsen played a record 102 games and scored four goals for the national team, and set a record of 50 games as Danish national team captain. His team captain record was broken by Lars Olsen in 1992, while his game tally was bested by Peter Schmeichel in 1998. In his entire international career, Morten Olsen only got one yellow card.

=== Style of play ===
Olsen played a wide variety of positions, including right winger, central midfielder, and libero. In his youth, Olsen's strengths were his acceleration, agility, and play intelligence and he played as a winger. In his first senior years, Olsen played all positions except goalkeeper, maturing him into a versatile team-player. He eventually found his place as a central midfielder. Though initially filling the role of playmaker rather than a ball-winning tackler, Olsen eventually excelled as a defensive midfielder possessing great determination, dedicated professionalism, and organisational skills. He gradually took on a strong leadership role, a trait he worked hard to develop.

At the age of 32, Olsen was moved back to the libero position, which transformed him from an established player to an international star-player. Olsen employed a wide variety of skills for a defensive player, including attacking surges and technical dribbling, taking advantage of his acceleration and vision of the game. He provided long passes from his deep position, while his forward surges helped create numerical advantages in the midfield. He was a consummate professional, known as a gentleman of the game.

== Coaching career ==
Olsen started his coaching career in January 1990, at the defending Danish champions Brøndby, and guided the club to two Danish championships. He put the team through tough fitness training which, even though it disgruntled some players, elevated the team into European top class, as Brøndby reached the semi-final of the 1990–91 UEFA Cup with Olsen at the helm. With the notable exception of Nigerian international defender Uche Okechukwu, his dabblings in the transfer market were not equally successful. This caused anger among the amateur department of the club, whose youth scheme they felt Olsen overlooked. As the club faced financial hardship and results began to lack in 1992, Olsen was fired from the club in May.

In April 1993, Olsen moved to his former team 1. FC Köln which he saved from relegation, when coming to its aid in the last six games of the 1992–93 Bundesliga season. In his time in Germany, he would become a certified coach, earning his "Fußball-Lehrer-Lizenz" diploma in 1993. For two seasons, he had the club positioned somewhat safely from relegation, despite not having any especially good players. At the start of the 1995–96 season, Köln were eliminated in the DFB-Pokal by an amateur team from Beckum, and Olsen was fired in August 1995.

He would have to wait for almost two years until Ajax in the Netherlands hired him on a contract starting from July 1997. He attracted Danish national team captain Michael Laudrup to the club, and together they won the Double of the Eredivisie championship and Dutch Cup trophy, as well as reaching the quarter-finals in the UEFA Cup. In his second year at the club, tension arose in the Ajax dressing room, as Dutch internationals Ronald de Boer and Frank de Boer boycotted training in order to leave the club in favour of Barcelona. As results began to suffer, Olsen was sacked in December 1998.

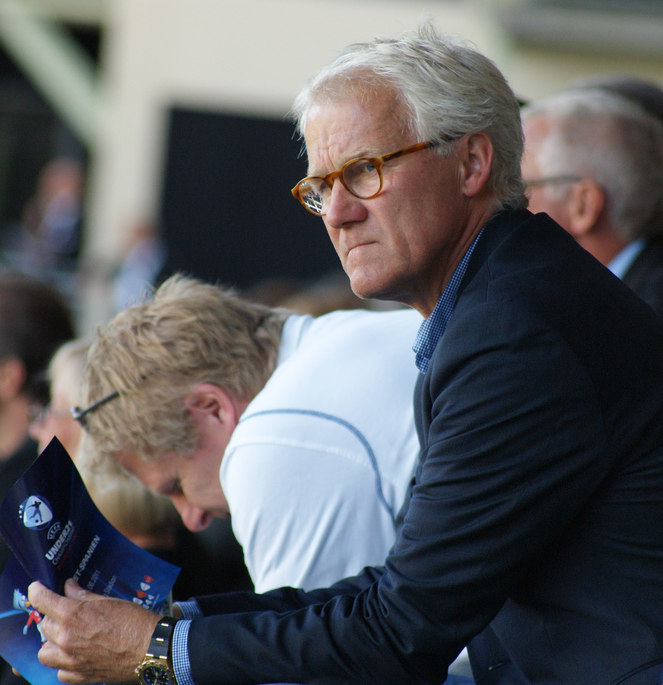
Olsen as national team manager, attending the 2011 European Under-21 Championship. Assistant manager Peter Bonde is to his left.

In the fall of 1999, Olsen signed a two-year contract with the Danish Football Association (DBU) to manage the Danish national team, effective after Denmark's participation at the 2000 European Championship. In July 2000, he replaced Swedish coach Bo Johansson as the manager of the Denmark national football team. As his assistant coach, Olsen chose Michael Laudrup. The duo guided Denmark to qualification for the 2002 FIFA World Cup tournament, a campaign which ended in the round of 16 match against England in a 0–3 defeat after Denmark won the initial stage group. Prior to the 2002 World Cup, Olsen signed a new four-year contract until June 2006. When Laudrup went on to coach Brøndby, Olsen chose Keld Bordinggaard as his new assistant coach. With Bordinggaard, Olsen guided Denmark to the 2004 European Championship tournament, which once again ended at the first knock-out stage. Olsen failed to qualify Denmark for the 2006 FIFA World Cup, but prolonged his contract with DBU in November 2005. A part of the new deal, which ran until and including the 2010 FIFA World Cup, was the added responsibility of defining a "red thread", or common denominator, in the talent work of the Danish national youth teams, thus giving Olsen a large influence on the future football being played by Denmark.

In March 2008, Olsen stated that he would like to see Michael Laudrup succeed him as coach of the Danish national team. Olsen did not qualify Denmark for the 2008 European Championship, and in August 2008 Olsen stated that he planned to let his contract expire in 2010, in order to return to coaching on club level. On 10 October 2009 he coached his 100th match as national team coach, as Denmark won 1–0 against Sweden and qualified for the 2010 FIFA World Cup. In January 2010, Olsen extended his contract until and including the 2012 European Championship. On 13 December 2013, Olsen further extended his contract to stay on as national coach until June 2016. Denmark failed to qualify for the 2014 World Cup in Brazil. "Many of us are disappointed that we didn't make it through this time after making the finals in the past two competitions," Olsen said in the press release. On 17 March 2015, Olsen stated that he would step down when his contract with Denmark ends, after the Euro, in 2016. However, his contract was mutually terminated immediately after the Danish national team failed to qualify for Euro 2016, beaten by Sweden 4–3 on aggregate on 17 November 2015. With 15 years of tenure, Morten Olsen is the longest-serving manager of Denmark.

== Personal life ==
Morten Olsen has been married to his Belgian wife and lived in Beersel near Brussels. In addition to Danish he speaks also Dutch, German, French and English.

== Career statistics ==
=== International ===
Appearances and goals by national team and year
National team	Year	Apps	Goals
Denmark	1970	3	0
Denmark	1971	9	2
Denmark	1972	5	0
Denmark	1973	1	0
Denmark	1974	6	0
Denmark	1975	2	0
Denmark	1976	4	0
Denmark	1977	2	0
Denmark	1978	3	0
Denmark	1979	6	0
Denmark	1980	5	0
Denmark	1981	5	0
Denmark	1982	2	0
Denmark	1983	6	0
Denmark	1984	10	0
Denmark	1985	7	0
Denmark	1986	11	0
Denmark	1987	5	0
Denmark	1988	7	1
Denmark	1989	3	1
Total		102	4

Scores and results list Denmark's goal tally first, score column indicates score after each Olsen goal.

List of international goals scored by Morten Olsen
No.	Date	Venue	Opponent	Score	Result	Competition
1	5 May 1971	Idrætsparken, Copenhagen, Denmark	Switzerland	2–0	4–0	1972 Olympic Games qualifier
2	1 August 1971	Aalborg Stadion, Aalborg, Denmark	England	2–1	3–2	Friendly
3	5 June 1988	Odense Stadion, Odense, Denmark	Belgium	1–1	3–1	Friendly
4	18 June 1989	Idrætsparken, Copenhagen, Denmark	Brazil	1–0	4–0	1989 Tri Tournament

=== Manager ===
As of 17 November 2015.

Club	From	To	Record				
Club	From	To	G	W	D	L	Win %
Brøndby	January 1990	May 1992	97	49	32	16	50.52
1. FC Köln	28 April 1993	26 August 1995	86	33	22	31	38.37
Ajax	1 July 1997	12 December 1998	72	49	10	13	68.06
Denmark	1 July 2000	17 November 2015	163	79	42	42	48.47
Total			418	210	106	102	50.24

== Honours ==
=== Player ===
Anderlecht

- Belgian First Division: 1980–81, 1984–85, 1985–86
- Belgian Supercup: 1985
- UEFA Cup: 1982–83; runner-up 1983–84
- Jules Pappaert Cup: 1983, 1985
- Bruges Matins: 1985

Individual

- Danish Football Player of the Year: 1983, 1986
- UEFA Euro Team of the Tournament: 1984
- Man of the Season (Belgian First Division): 1980–81, 1984–85
- World XI: 1984, 1985, 1986
- Danish Football Hall of Fame

=== Manager ===
Brøndby

- Danish 1st Division / Danish Superliga: 1990, 1991

Ajax

- Eredivisie: 1997–98
- KNVB Cup: 1997–98

== See also ==
- List of men's footballers with 100 or more international caps
- List of longest managerial reigns in association football
- National team managers with 100 or more matches
