= List of protected areas of Aarhus Municipality =

This list of protected areas in Aarhus Municipality lists protected areas in Aarhus Municipality, Denmark. Three protections in the municipality are shared with adjacent Skanderborg Municipality.

Aarhus Municipality holds a total of four Natura2000 in-land protections of international importance. There is also a sea-area Natura2000 protection in the Bay of Aarhus at the Mejlflak reef.

Of the other protections within the municipality, most of the older ones are grounded in attempts at protecting scenic landscape values or securing public access, while more recent protections are mostly based in protecting biodiversity and threatened habitats.

== List ==
Image	Locality	Size	Year	Coordinates	Description	Source
	Brabrand Lake and Aarhus River Valley Including Brabrand Lake, Årslev Engsø and parts of Aarhus River Valley	521 hectare	1959, 1983, 1984 and 2001	56°08′34″N 10°03′58″E	Landscape, rich fen habitat and locally endangered species. Natura 2000, EU Habitats area	Ref 1, Ref 2
	Skæring Bæk and Skæring Strand					Ref
	Egå stream, Åkrogen and Vejlby Strand		1918, 1926, 1956 and 1961	56°12′24″N 10°17′06″E	River mouth and beach	Ref
	Grevelund		1967	56°16′00″N 10°20′18″E	Landscape (fields, woodland and beach habitats)	Ref
	Mariendal	2.3 hectare	1959, 1964	56°03′03″N 10°15′23″E	Landscape	Ref
	Parts of Marselisborg Forests Including the stream of Giber Å, Enemærket forest and wetland habitat, and the hills of Skåde Havbakker	168 hectares		56°05′40″N 10°14′41″E	Forest, meadow, wetland and river habitats. Coastal cliffs. Northern crested newt and otter. Natura 2000	
	Fulden Fredningen Including Fulden and Moesgård		1932, 1943, 1959, 1979		Historical rural landscapes and nature, including a village, historic manor and estate.	Ref
	Holme Bjerge	124 hectare	1967		Landscape	Ref
	Harlev Fredningen Including the forests of Stjær Stenskov and Lillering Forest	220 hectare (a small part in Skanderborg Municipality)	1962, 2017	56°08′00″N 9°58′31″E	Glacial stone deposit, ancient woodland, special wetland habitats, and historical ridge and furrows. Natura 2000 since 2017	Ref,
	Jeksendalen	746 hectare (mostly in Skanderborg Municipality)	1979	56°06′50″N 9°59′47″E	Landscape of both historical and biological importance (woodlands, streams and wet meadow habitats)	Ref
	Aarhus Botanical Gardens		2017	56°09′38″N 10°11′27″E	City park	Ref
	Stilling-Solbjerg Lake and Pilbrodalen	mostly in Skanderborg Municipality		56°02′38″N 10°03′50″E	Lake habitat and glacial valley	Ref
	Mejl Flak			56°03′07″N 10°28′09″E	Shallow sandy and stony reef in Aarhus Bay. Natura 2000, EU Habitats area	Ref
