= Robinson Ekspeditionen 2018 =

- Season 2018
- Presented by: Jakob Kjeldbjerg
- No. of days: 45
- No. of castaways: 27
- Winner: Jamil Faizi
- Runners-up: Zanne Maibritt Øbakke; Puriya "Loco" Haidariano
- Location: Caramoan, Philippines
- No. of episodes: 13

Release
- Original network: TV3
- Original release: August 27 – November 19, 2018

Season chronology
- ← Previous; 2017 Next → 2019

Robinson Ekspeditionen 2018 was the twentieth season of the Danish version of Swedish television series Expedition Robinson. The season premiered on August 27, 2018. This season began with three tribes as opposed to two. This year the tribes were separated into groups by Heltene (Heroes), Skurkene (Villains) and Jokerne (Jokers). In the premiere episode tribes were introduced by Robinson winners Dan "The Man" Marstrand and Sonny Rønne Petersen, as well as veteran Richard Asklund. As punishment for losing the first challenge the Jokerne tribe was forced to live in a swamp. A returning feature this season is the duel. Similar to last season, this year the winner of the duel has their tribe exempt from participating in the immunity challenge and therefore, safe from tribal council. The loser of the duel is sent home and has to have their tribe compete in the immunity challenge against the tribe that finished second.

== Finishing order ==
Notable cast members includes Türker Alici, former contestant on Paradise Hotel.

Contestant	Original Tribe	Absorbed Tribe	Duel Swap	Tribal Swap	Merged Tribe	Finish
Allan Sørensen; 45, Brøndby Strand	Heltene					Lost Duel; Day 2
Malene Hald-Sørensen; 29, Gentofte	Jokerne					1st Voted Out; Day 3
Sasha Louise Sprange; 36, Copenhagen	Skurkene					Lost Duel; Day 6
Martin Lundsgaard; 30, Nørre Søby	Skurkene					Medically evacuated Day 7
Tine Lynhe Bonde; 25, Haderslev	Jokerne					2nd Voted Out; Day 7
Casper Von Stellfeld Skou; 25, Copenhagen	Jokerne					Lost Duel; Day 9
Kristine Kanstrup; 35, Aabybro	Jokerne					3rd Voted Out; Day 11
Søren Danscher; 33, Horsens	Heltene					Medically evacuated Day 12
Jakob Davidsen; 43, Overlade	Jokerne					Lost Duel; Day 13
Teis Skou Rasmussen; 38, Copenhagen	Skurkene	Skurkene				Medically evacuated Day 14
Dorthe Bjergsted; 32, Mogenstrup	Skurkene	Skurkene				4th Voted Out; Day 15
Sebastian Schor Olsen; 25, Haslev	Jokerne	Skurkene				Lost Duel; Day 17
Benedikte Askirke; 42, Svendborg	Skurkene	Skurkene				5th Voted Out; Day 18
Louise Børresen Hvilsom; 26, Copenhagen	Jokerne	Skurkene	Skurkene			6th Voted Out; Day 22
Lasse Hammer Kirkegaard; 27, London, England	Jokerne	Heltene	Heltene	South Team		7th Voted Out; Day 25
Linea Sindt; 23, Copenhagen	Heltene	Heltene	Heltene	North Team		8th Voted Out; Day 28
Ulrik Skovgaard-Mortensen; 41, Solrød Strand	Skurkene	Skurkene	Skurkene	South Team		Lost Duel; Day 30
Emilie Elmquist; 26, Paris, France	Skurkene	Skurkene	Skurkene	South Team		9th Voted Out; Day 31
Morten Bøvling Pedersen; 40, Øster Hornum	Heltene	Heltene	Heltene	South Team	Robinson	10th Voted Out; Day 35
Yasser El-Ahmad; 29, Hørsholm	Skurkene	Skurkene	Heltene	North Team	Robinson	11th Voted Out; Day 38
Melis Mortensen; 24, Horslunde	Heltene	Heltene	Heltene	South Team	Robinson	Lost Duel; Day 40
Türker Alici; 26, Harlev	Jokerne	Heltene	Heltene	North Team	Robinson	12th Voted Out; Day 41
Karina Filbert Brorsen; 28, Copenhagen	Heltene	Heltene	Heltene	South Team	Robinson	Lost Challenge; Day 43
Michael Kristiansen; 54, Tune	Heltene	Heltene	Heltene	North Team	Robinson	Lost Challenge; Day 44
Puriya "Loco" Haidariano; 33, Copenhagen	Heltene	Heltene	Heltene	North Team	Robinson	2nd Runner-up; Day 45
Zanne Maibritt Øbakke; 43, Jægerspris	Heltene	Heltene	Heltene	North Team	Robinson	Runner-up; Day 45
Jamil Faizi; 22, Grenaa	Skurkene	Skurkene	Skurkene	North Team	Robinson	Robinson; Day 45

== Season summary ==
Challenge winners and eliminations by episode
Episode		Challenge winner(s)			Eliminated	Finish
No.	Original air date	Duel	Reward		Eliminated	Finish
No.	Original air date	Duel	Reward	Immunity	Eliminated	Finish
1	27 August 2018	Martin^{1}	Skurkene	Heltene	Allan	Lost Duel; Day 2
1	27 August 2018	Kristine	Heltene	Heltene	Malene	1st voted out Day 3
2	3 September 2018	Søren^{2}	Jokerne	Skurkene	Sasha	Lost Duel; Day 6
2	3 September 2018	Søren^{2}	Jokerne	Skurkene	Martin	Medically evacuated Day 7
2	3 September 2018	Sebastian	Jokerne	Skurkene	Tine	2nd voted out Day 7
3	10 September 2018	Zanne^{3}	Skurkene	Skurkene	Casper	Lost Duel; Day 9
3	10 September 2018	Dorthe	Skurkene	Skurkene	Kristine	3rd voted out Day 11
4	17 September 2018	Ulrik^{4}	Heltene	Heltene	Søren	Medically Evacuated; Day 12
4	17 September 2018	Ulrik^{4}	Heltene	Heltene	Jakob	Lost Duel; Day 13
4	17 September 2018	Karina	Heltene	Heltene	Teis	Medically Evacuated; Day 14
4	17 September 2018	Karina	Heltene	Heltene	Dorthe	4th voted out Day 15
5	24 September 2018	Türker	Heltene	Heltene	Sebastian	Lost Duel; Day 17
5	24 September 2018	Türker	Heltene	Heltene	Benedikte	5th voted out Day 18
6	1 October 2018	Türker^{5}	Heltene	Heltene	Louise	6th voted out Day 22
7	8 October 2018	Jamil^{6}	North Team	Morten^{7}	Lasse	7th voted out Day 25
8	15 October 2018	Morten^{8}	South Team	Jamil^{9}	Linea	8th voted out Day 28
9	22 October 2018	Türker^{10}	North Team	Melis	Ulrik	Lost Duel; Day 30
9	22 October 2018	Türker^{10}	North Team	Melis	Emilie	9th voted out Day 31
10	29 October 2018	Morten^{11}	Loco	Jamil^{12}	Morten	10th voted out Day 35
11	5 November 2018	Karina	Loco	Jamil	Yasser ^{13}	11th voted out Day 38
12	12 November 2018	Jamil; Loco	Loco (Jamil, Michael)	Zanne	Melis	Lost Duel; Day 40
12	12 November 2018	Jamil; Loco	Loco (Jamil, Michael)	Zanne	Türker^{14}	12th voted out Day 41
13	19 November 2018				Karina	Lost Challenge; Day 43
13	19 November 2018				Michael	Lost Challenge; Day 44
13	19 November 2018				Loco	2nd Runner-Up; Day 45
13	19 November 2018				Zanne	Runner-Up; Day 45
13	19 November 2018				Jamil	Robinson; Day 45

^1 As Martin came in first at the death match duel his tribe was given immunity and did not need to compete in the first immunity challenge.

^2 As Søren came in first at the death match duel his tribe was given immunity and did not need to compete in the second immunity challenge.

^3 As Zanne came in first at the death match duel her tribe was given immunity and did not need to compete in the third immunity challenge.

^4 As Ulrik came in first at the death match duel he was allowed to pick first when the Jokerne tribe was absorbed.

^5 As Yasser lost the death match duel he was absorbed into the Heltene tribe.

^6 As Jamil won the death match duel the North team was immune from tribal council. As punishment for losing the death match duel Lasse received a penalty vote at the next tribal council.

^7 As punishment for coming in last at the immunity challenge Emilie received a penalty vote at the next tribal council.

^8 As Morten won the death match duel the South team was immune from tribal council. As punishment for losing the death match duel Türker received a penalty vote at the next tribal council.

^9 As punishment for coming in last at the immunity challenge Loco received a penalty vote at the next tribal council.

^10 As Türker won the death match duel the North team was immune from tribal council.

^11 As punishment for losing the death match duel Melis received a penalty vote at the next tribal council.

^12 As punishment for coming in last at the immunity challenge Türker received a penalty vote at the next tribal council.

^13 As there was a tie at tribal council Karina and Yasser took part in a duel to determine who would be eliminated.

^14 As there was a tie at tribal council Michael and Türker took part in a duel to determine who would be eliminated.

== Voting history ==
	Original Tribes									Absorbed Tribes				Duel Swap	Tribal Swap				Merged Tribe								
Episode #:	1		2			3		4				5		6	7	8	9		10	11		12			13		
Eliminated:	Allan; No vote	Malene; 6/9 votes	Sasha; No vote	Martin; No vote	Tine; 6/8 votes	Casper; No vote	Kristine; 5/6 votes	Søren; No vote	Jakob; No vote	Teis; No vote	Dorthe; 6/8 votes	Sebastian; No vote	Benedikte; 5/6 votes	Louise; 3/4 votes	Lasse; 6/8 votes^{1}, ^{2}	Linea; 4/9 votes^{3}, ^{4}	Ulrik; No vote	Emilie; 3/4 votes	Morten; 6/11 votes^{5}, ^{6}	Tie	Yasser; No vote^{7}	Melis; No vote	Tie	Türker; No vote^{8}	Karina; No vote^{9}	Michael; No vote^{10}	Jamil
Eliminated:	Allan; No vote	Malene; 6/9 votes	Sasha; No vote	Martin; No vote	Tine; 6/8 votes	Casper; No vote	Kristine; 5/6 votes	Søren; No vote	Jakob; No vote	Teis; No vote	Dorthe; 6/8 votes	Sebastian; No vote	Benedikte; 5/6 votes	Louise; 3/4 votes	Lasse; 6/8 votes^{1}, ^{2}	Linea; 4/9 votes^{3}, ^{4}	Ulrik; No vote	Emilie; 3/4 votes	Morten; 6/11 votes^{5}, ^{6}	Tie	Yasser; No vote^{7}	Melis; No vote	Tie	Türker; No vote^{8}	Karina; No vote^{9}	Michael; No vote^{10}	Zanne
Eliminated:	Allan; No vote	Malene; 6/9 votes	Sasha; No vote	Martin; No vote	Tine; 6/8 votes	Casper; No vote	Kristine; 5/6 votes	Søren; No vote	Jakob; No vote	Teis; No vote	Dorthe; 6/8 votes	Sebastian; No vote	Benedikte; 5/6 votes	Louise; 3/4 votes	Lasse; 6/8 votes^{1}, ^{2}	Linea; 4/9 votes^{3}, ^{4}	Ulrik; No vote	Emilie; 3/4 votes	Morten; 6/11 votes^{5}, ^{6}	Tie	Yasser; No vote^{7}	Melis; No vote	Tie	Türker; No vote^{8}	Karina; No vote^{9}	Michael; No vote^{10}	Loco
Voter	Vote																										
Jamil											Dorthe		Benedikte	Louise		Linea			Morten	Karina		1st	Türker			Won	1st
Zanne						1st										Yasser			Morten	Yasser			Michael		Safe	Jamil	2nd
Loco																Linea			Morten	Karina		2nd	Türker			Safe	3rd
Michael																Linea			Morten	Karina			Türker	Won	Won	Lost	
Karina									2nd						Lasse			Emilie	Yasser	Yasser	Won		Michael		Lost	Loco	
Türker		Malene			Tine		Kristine					Won				Yasser	Won		Morten	Yasser			Michael	Lost		Loco	
Melis															Lasse			Emilie	Yasser	Yasser		Lost				Loco	
Yasser											Dorthe		Benedikte			Linea			Morten	Karina	Lost					Loco	
Morten															Lasse			Emilie	Yasser								
Emilie											Dorthe		Benedikte	Louise	Lasse			Karina								Jamil	
Ulrik									1st		Benedikte		Benedikte	Louise	Lasse		Lost									Jamil	
Linea																Yasser											
Lasse		Malene			Tine		Kristine								Emilie												
Louise		Malene			Tine		Kristine				Dorthe		Benedikte	Ulrik													
Benedikte											Dorthe		Louise														
Sebastian		Malene	2nd		Tine		Kristine				Dorthe	Lost															
Dorthe						2nd					Benedikte																
Teis																											
Jakob		Malene			Tine		Kristine		Lost																		
Søren			1st																								
Kristine	2nd	Casper			Sebastian		Lasse																				
Casper		Malene			Tine	Lost																					
Tine		Casper			Sebastian																						
Martin	1st																										
Sasha			Lost																								
Malene		Casper																									
Allan	Lost																										

^1 As Jamil won the death match duel the North team was immune from tribal council. As punishment for losing the death match duel Lasse received a penalty vote at the next tribal council.

^2 As punishment for coming in last at the immunity challenge Emilie received a penalty vote at the next tribal council.

^3 As Morten won the death match duel the South team was immune from tribal council. As punishment for losing the death match duel Türker received a penalty vote at the next tribal council.

^4 As punishment for coming in last at the immunity challenge Loco received a penalty vote at the next tribal council.

^5 As punishment for losing the death match duel Melis received a penalty vote at the next tribal council.

^6 As punishment for coming in last at the immunity challenge Türker received a penalty vote at the next tribal council.

^7 As there was a tie at tribal council Karina and Yasser took part in a duel to determine who would be eliminated.

^8 As there was a tie at tribal council Michael and Türker took part in a duel to determine who would be eliminated.

^9 As reward for winning plank at the start of the final Zanne was automatically given a spot in the final challenge and immunity from the last two elimination challenges. She was also granted the right to vote for the second finalist along with the jury.

^10 As he received the most jury votes to proceed to the final challenge of Loco, Jamil and Michael, Loco was granted the second spot in the final challenge and did not have to take part in the final elimination.
