= Lillering Forest =

Forest in Denmark

Lillering Forest Lillering Skov
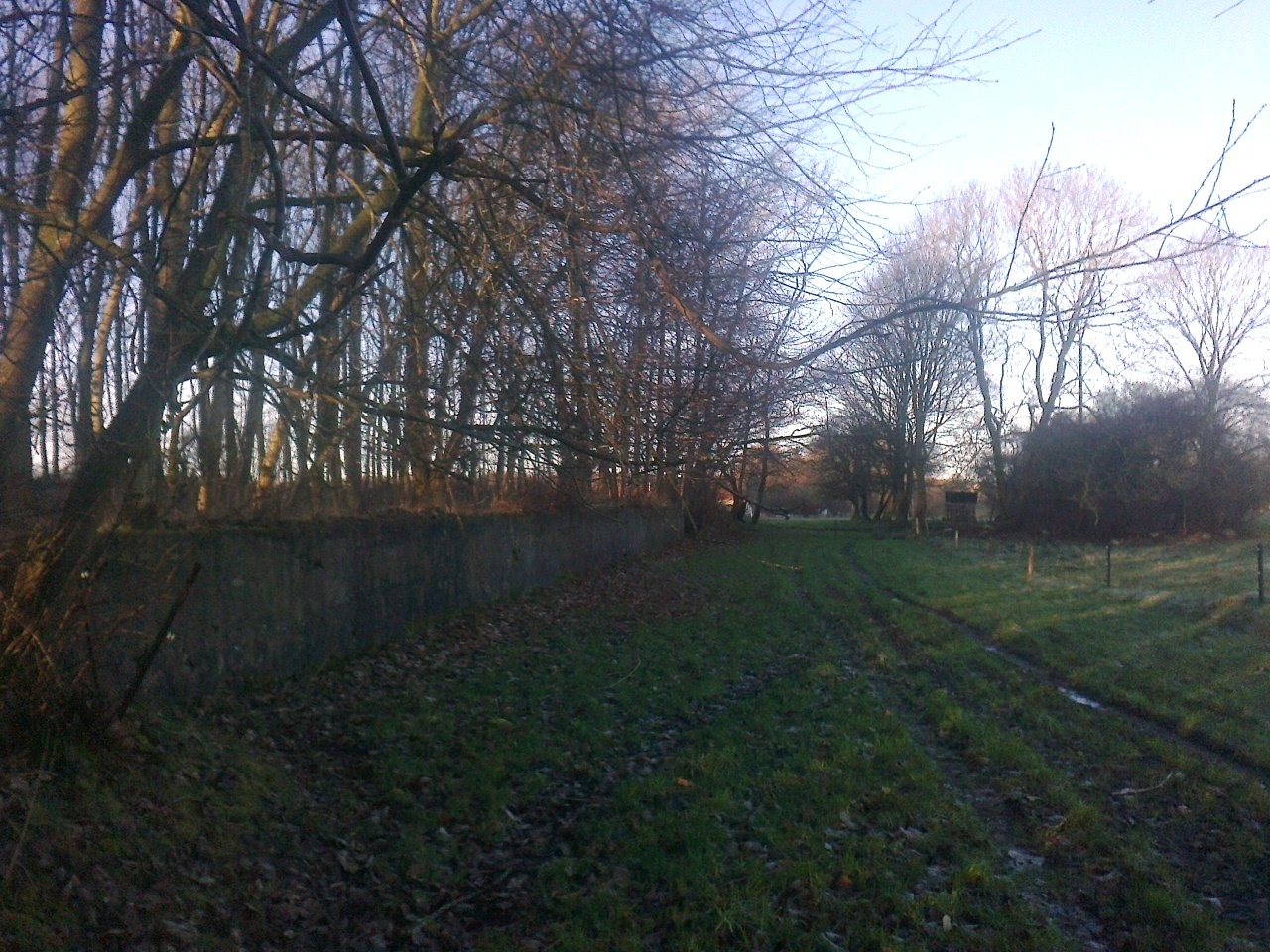
- Northern outskirts of Lillering Forest

- Location within Denmark

Geography
- Location: Aarhus Municipality, Denmark
- Coordinates: 56°08′22.9″N 9°58′37.4″E
- Area: 50 ha (120 acres)

Administration
- Status: Natura 2000 protected site
- Authority: Aarhus Municipality

Lillering Forest (Danish: Lillering Skov) is a forest and protected Natura 2000 area in Denmark. It is located in peninsular Denmark in Aarhus Municipality, south of Harlev and some 10 km. west of Aarhus. It is a deciduous forest covering some 50 hectares and it is composed mainly of beech and European ash. It is privately owned but protected and partially managed by Aarhus Municipality and the Danish Nature Agency. The Natura 2000 site covers 135 hectares and also encompasses Tåstrup Bog, Tåstrup Lake and Stjær Forest, south of Lillering Forest. The southern section with Stjær Forest is within, and managed by, Skanderborg Municipality.

== Flora and fauna ==
Lillering Forest and surroundings has been known as a botanically interesting locality for many years with the earliest description dating back to 1877 (Zahrtmann 1877). Some 400 vascular plants have been registered, about a third of Danish plants. A number of plants primarily exist in south-eastern Denmark, and further south, with the northern boundary being at or around Aarhus and some of these are well represented in Lillering Forest. The most important might be hornbeam which has a significant presence. Others are plants such as dead-nettles, white butterbur, bitter-cress, wall barley, yellow and blue anemone and the endangered multicolored viola. In addition a total of nine species of orchids have been registered although in later years only six has been noted - these are the broad-leaved helleborine, green-flowered helleborine, early-purple orchid, western marsh orchid, early marsh-orchid, eggleaf twayblade and the greater butterfly-orchid. The border zone between Tåstrup Bog and Lillering Forest contains woodland geranium and mountain melick.

The area contains several rare species of geometer moths associated with buckthorns that grow at the woodland edge or in Tåstrup Bog. The nearby meadows is home to a rare, small owl that lives on species of mouse-ear chickweed. The meadows in the forest has a number of moths such as the six-spot burnet which are endangered in Denmark. Some 6 species are registered of which 3 in Jutland are found only here and 4 are associated with hackberry at the woodland edge. The stream Bøgebakke Bæk has a large population of the uncommon mayfly siphlonurus aestivalis.

== Natura 2000 ==
The Natura 2000 protected area includes Tåstrup Lake and adjoining wetlands (c. 20 ha.), Tåstrup Bog (c. 25 ha.), Lillering Forest (ca. 50 ha.) and Stjær Forest consisting of the forests Søskov and Stjær Stenskov (c. 20 ha). The four areas are not connected since former agricultural land separates Lillering Forest and Tåstrup Bog to the north and Tåstrup Lake and Stjær Forest to the south.
