= Henrik Wann Jensen =

Danish computer graphics researcher (born 1969)

Henrik Wann Jensen (born 1969 in Harlev, Jutland, Denmark) is a Danish computer graphics researcher. He is best known for developing the photon mapping technique as the subject of his PhD thesis, but has also done important research in simulating subsurface scattering and the sky.

He was awarded an Academy Award (Academy Award for Technical Achievement) in 2004 together with Stephen R. Marschner and Pat Hanrahan for pioneering research in simulating subsurface scattering of light in translucent materials as presented in their paper "A Practical Model for Subsurface Light Transport". The technique of simulating and scattering light on a subsurface are used by the major render engines in the computer graphics industry like Mental Ray or V-Ray.

He is a professor emeritus at the Computer Graphics Laboratory at University of California, San Diego and has engineering degrees from the Technical University of Denmark, where he received his PhD. He is chief scientist at Luxion, a company focused on simulating physically accurate light properties on a 3D object.
