= Robinson Ekspeditionen 2016 =

- Season 2016
- Presented by: Jakob Kjeldbjerg
- No. of days: 44
- No. of castaways: 27
- Winner: Henrik Oltmann Andersen
- Runners-up: Nikolaj Lund Mortensen; Sofie Wulf Kampmann
- Location: Caramoan, Philippines
- No. of episodes: 13

Release
- Original network: TV3
- Original release: August 29 – November 21, 2016

Season chronology
- ← Previous; 2015 Next → 2017

Robinson Ekspeditionen 2016 is the eighteenth season of the Danish version of the Swedish television series Expedition Robinson. This season premiered on August 29, 2016. The main twist this season is that there are three tribes instead of the usual two. Of the three tribes one is comprised completely of men, another of women and a third of mostly couples. In the first episode of the season the one member of each tribe immediately forced to compete in an elimination challenge in which the losing contestant would be eliminated from the competition. Tina lost the competition to Mathias and Kim and was eliminated, however she returned in the following episode along with first voted out Katja following a series of voluntary exits. As the winner of the first challenge, Mathias earned his tribe immunity meaning they would not need to compete in the first immunity challenge. Beginning in episode two the winning tribe of the reward challenge would win immunity and exemption from the immunity challenge. Following his girlfriend Natasha's voluntary exit, Kim was ejected from the competition. In the second and third episodes both Jesper and Tina were eliminated after losing their respective duels.

== Finishing order ==
Notable cast members includes Caroline Petersen, a former contestant on Paradise Hotel, Sofie Wulff Kampmann, former contestant on MasterChef Danmark and Ulrik Pihl, former contestant on Gift ved første blik.

Contestant	Original Tribes Partner	Episode 2/3 Tribes Partner	Episode 4/5 Tribes Partner	Tribal Dissolve	Merged Tribe	Finish
Tina Vilbrand; Returned to Game	South Team					Lost Challenge; Day 1
Katja Olsen; Returned to Game	South Team					1st Voted Out; Day 3
Thomas Rafn; 26, Odense	North Team	North Team				Quit; Day 5
Caroline Petersen; 18, Frederikssund	East Team; Single	East Team; Single				Quit; Day 5
Natasha Bendix Helms; 22, Copenhagen	East Team; Kim	East Team; Kim				Quit; Day 5
Jesper Tønder; 28, Kolding	North Team	North Team				Lost Duel; Day 5
Johan Djørup Müller; 26, Roskilde	North Team	North Team				Quit due to Injury; Day 6
Kim Novaa; 44, Copenhagen	East Team; Natasha	East Team; Natasha				Ejected; Day 6
Aliza Nowak; 29, Ringsted	South Team	South Team				Quit; Day 7
Tina Vilbrand; 43, Albertslund; Season 14, 21st Place	South Team	East Team; Single				Lost Duel; Day 8
Sofie Wulff Kampmann; Returned to Game	South Team	South Team				2nd Voted Out; Day 10
Josephine Juncker; 23, Odense	East Team; Glen	East Team; Glen	East Team; Glen			Evacuated; Day 11
Benjamin Christensen; 26, Slagelse	East Team; Michelle	East Team; Michelle	East Team; Michelle			3rd Voted Out; Day 13
Tobias Friberg; 20, Copenhagen			North Team			Quit; Day 15
Stina Rasmussen; 48, Odense	South Team	South Team	East Team; Single			4th Voted Out; Day 17
Thomas "Bennike" Bennike; 51, Næstved	East Team; Single	East Team; Single	North Team	North Team		5th Voted Out; Day 21
Glen Madsen; 35, Odense	East Team; Josefine	East Team; Josefine	South Team; Josefine	South Team; Josefine		6th Voted Out; Day 24
Katja Olsen; 40, Amager	South Team	East Team; Single	South Team	South Team		Ejected; Day 24
Michelle Hansen; 24, Slagelse	East Team; Benjamin	East Team; Benjamin	East Team; Benjamin	North Team; Benjamin		7th Voted Out; Day 28
Ulrik Pihl; 35, Ringe	North Team	North Team	East Team; Single	South Team		8th Voted Out; Day 31
Richard Asklund; 45, Copenhagen	North Team	North Team	North Team	North Team	Robinson	9th Voted Out; Day 34
Rene Jensen; 36, Svenstrup	North Team	North Team	North Team	North Team	Robinson	10th Voted Out; Day 36
Nanna Lyngbøl; 27, Aarhus	South Team	South Team	North Team	North Team	Robinson	Lost Duel; Day 39
Liza Pedersen; 22, Frederikssund	South Team	South Team	East Team; Single	South Team	Robinson	11th Voted Out; Day 41
Sanne Juul Bojko; 28, Hillerød	South Team	South Team	South Team	South Team	Robinson	Lost Challenge; Day 42
Malou Petersen; 26, Søborg	South Team	South Team	South Team	South Team	Robinson	Lost Challenge; Day 42
Mathias Lynge; 23, Aalborg	North Team	North Team	South Team	South Team	Robinson	Lost Challenge; Day 43
Sofie Wulff Kampmann; 20, Charlottenlund	South Team	South Team	South Team	North Team	Robinson	2nd-Runner-Up; Day 44
Nikolaj Lund Mortensen; 26, Frederiksberg	North Team	North Team	North Team	North Team	Robinson	Runner-Up; Day 44
Henrik Oltmann Andersen; 36, Solrød Strand	North Team	North Team	South Team	South Team	Robinson	Sole Survivor; Day 44

== Season summary ==
Challenge winners and eliminations by episode
Episode		Challenge winner(s)			Eliminated	Finish
No.	Original air date	Duel	Reward		Eliminated	Finish
No.	Original air date	Duel	Reward	Immunity	Eliminated	Finish
1	29 August 2016	Mathias	None	North Team	Tina	Lost Duel; Day 1
1	29 August 2016	Kim	None	East Team	Katja	1st voted out Day 3
2	5 September 2016	Sofie	South Team	South Team	Thomas	Left Competition; Day 5
2	5 September 2016	Sofie	South Team	South Team	Caroline	Left Competition; Day 5
2	5 September 2016	Sofie	South Team	South Team	Natasha	Left Competition; Day 5
2	5 September 2016	Kim	South Team	North Team	Jesper	Lost Duel; Day 5
2	5 September 2016	Kim	South Team	North Team	Johan	Left Competition; Day 6
2	5 September 2016	Kim	South Team	North Team	Kim	Ejected; Day 6
3	12 September 2016	Nikolaj	North Team	North Team	Aliza	Left Competition; Day 7
3	12 September 2016	Nikolaj	North Team	North Team	Tina	Lost Duel; Day 8
3	12 September 2016	Liza	North Team	East Team	Sofie	2nd voted out Day 10
4	19 September 2016	None	North Team	North Team	Josephine	Evacuated; Day 11
4	19 September 2016	None	North Team	South Team	Benjamin	3rd Voted Out; Day 13
5	26 September 2016	Bennike	North Team	North Team	Tobias	Left Competition; Day 15
5	26 September 2016	Michelle	North Team	South Team	Stina	4th Voted Out; Day 17
6	3 October 2016	Henrik	South Team	South Team	Bennike	5th Voted Out; Day 21
6	3 October 2016	Richard	South Team	South Team	Bennike	5th Voted Out; Day 21
7	10 October 2016	Richard	North Team	North Team	Glen	6th Voted Out; Day 24
7	10 October 2016	Richard	North Team	Henrik	Katja	Ejected; Day 24
8	17 October 2016	Malou	South Team	South Team	Michelle	7th Voted Out; Day 28
8	17 October 2016	Malou	South Team	Richard	Michelle	7th Voted Out; Day 28
9	24 October 2016	Nikolaj, Nanna	South Team	North Team	Ulrik	8th Voted Out; Day 31
9	24 October 2016	Nikolaj, Nanna	South Team	Malou	Ulrik	8th Voted Out; Day 31
10	31 October 2016	Richard	Sanne, Nikolaj	Liza	Richard	9th Voted Out; Day 34
11	7 November 2016	Rene	Mathias	Mathias	Rene	10th Voted Out; Day 36
12	14 November 2016	Malou	Henrik	Mathias	Nanna	Lost Duel; Day 39
12	14 November 2016	Malou	Henrik	Mathias	Liza	11th Voted Out; Day 41
13	21 November 2016				Sanne	Lost Challenge; Day 42
13	21 November 2016				Malou	Lost Challenge; Day 42
13	21 November 2016				Mathias	Lost Challenge; Day 43
13	21 November 2016				Sofie	2nd Runner-Up; Day 44
13	21 November 2016				Nikolaj	Runner-Up; Day 44
13	21 November 2016				Henrik	Sole Survivor; Day 44

=== Voting history ===
	Original Tribes		Episode 2-3 tribes									Tribal Swap				Tribal Dissolve					Merge Tribe							
Episode #	1		2						3			4		5		6	7		8	9	10	11	12		13			
Day #	Day 1	Day 3	Day 5				Day 6		Day 7	Day 8	Day 10	Day 11	Day 13	Day 15	Day 17	Day 21	Day 24		Day 28	Day 31	Day 34	Day 36	Day 39	Day 41	Day 42		Day 43	Day 44
Eliminated	Tina	Katja	Thomas	Caroline	Natasha	Jesper	Johan	Kim	Aliza	Tina	Sofie	Josephine	Benjamin	Tobias	Stina	Bennike^{1}	Glen^{2}	Katja	Michelle^{3}	Ulrik^{4}	Richard^{5}	Rene^{6}, ^{7}	Nanna^{8}	Liza^{9}, ^{10}	Sanne	Malou	Mathias	Henrik
Eliminated	Tina	Katja	Thomas	Caroline	Natasha	Jesper	Johan	Kim	Aliza	Tina	Sofie	Josephine	Benjamin	Tobias	Stina	Bennike^{1}	Glen^{2}	Katja	Michelle^{3}	Ulrik^{4}	Richard^{5}	Rene^{6}, ^{7}	Nanna^{8}	Liza^{9}, ^{10}	Sanne	Malou	Mathias	Nikolaj
Eliminated	Tina	Katja	Thomas	Caroline	Natasha	Jesper	Johan	Kim	Aliza	Tina	Sofie	Josephine	Benjamin	Tobias	Stina	Bennike^{1}	Glen^{2}	Katja	Michelle^{3}	Ulrik^{4}	Richard^{5}	Rene^{6}, ^{7}	Nanna^{8}	Liza^{9}, ^{10}	Sanne	Malou	Mathias	Sofie
Votes	No votes	5-3	No votes								4-2	No vote	3-2	No vote	3-1	5-3-3-2	4-2-2-1	No votes	5-3	5-3-1	7-4-1	7-2-1-1	No Vote	5-3	No Vote			
Voter	Vote																											
Henrik	Safe					Safe				Safe							Glen			Ulrik	Richard	Rene		Liza	Won			1st
Nikolaj	Safe					Safe				1st						Michelle			Rene		Richard	Rene		Liza	Won			2nd
Sofie	Safe	Aliza				1st				Safe	Stina					Bennike			Rene		Richard	Rene		Sanne	Won			3rd
Mathias	1st					Safe				Safe							Glen			Liza	Richard	Rene		Liza	Won		Lost	
Malou	Safe	Katja				Safe				Safe	Sofie						Katja			Ulrik	Richard	Rene		Liza	Won	Lost		
Sanne	Safe	Katja				Safe				Safe	Sofie						Katja			Ulrik	Richard	Rene		Liza	Lost			
Liza	Safe	Aliza				Safe				2nd	Stina		Benjamin		Stina		Glen			Henrik	Richard	Rene		Sanne				
Nanna	Safe	Katja				Safe				Safe	Sofie					Bennike			Michelle		Nikolaj	~~Malou~~	Lost					
Rene	Safe					Safe				Safe						Bennike			Michelle		Nikolaj	~~Malou~~						
Richard	Safe					Safe				Safe						Bennike			Michelle		Nikolaj (x2)							
Ulrik	Safe					Safe				Safe			Benjamin		Stina		Glen			Henrik								
Michelle	Safe					Safe				Safe			Stina		Stina	Bennike			Rene									
Katja	Safe	Aliza				Safe				Safe							Ulrik											
Glen	Safe					Safe				Safe							Mathias											
Bennike	Safe					Safe				Safe						Michelle												
Stina	Safe	Katja				Safe				Safe	Sofie		Benjamin		Michelle													
Tobias	Not in Game																											
Benjamin	Safe					Safe				Safe			Stina															
Josephine	Safe					Safe				Safe																		
Tina	Lost	Returns				Safe				Lost																		
Aliza	Safe	Katja				Safe																						
Kim	2nd					2nd																						
Johan	Safe					Safe																						
Jesper	Safe					Lost																						
Natasha	Safe																											
Caroline	Safe																											
Thomas	Safe																											

^1 After losing the duel Nanna was penalized with 3 votes at tribal council, Rene 2 and Michelle 1.

^2 After losing the duel Mathias was penalized with an additional vote at tribal council.

^3 After losing the duel and individual immunity Michelle was penalized with two additional votes at tribal council.

^4 After losing the duel Henrik and Ulrik were each penalized with a vote at tribal council. Ulrik also came last in the individual immunity challenge and was penalized with another vote at tribal council.

^5 As the loser of the duel Sanne was penalized with a vote at tribal council. As winner of the duel Richard had an additional vote to cast at tribal council.

^6 As the loser of the duel and immunity challenge Nanna was penalized with two votes at tribal council. As Liza and Sanne both lost the immunity challenge they each received a penalty vote at tribal council.

^7 Malou played the hidden immunity idol at tribal council and thus all votes cast against her were voided.

^8 After losing the duel Nanna was eliminated.

^9 After losing the immunity challenge Sanne was penalized with an additional vote at tribal council.

^10 Sofie and Malou were each given an envelope in which one of them received an immunity at tribal council while the other was to compete in a duel against the eliminated player. The loser of the duel would be out of the expedition. Sofie's envelope contained immunity while Malou's stated duel. Malou would then dueled Liza and won. Liza was then eliminated.
