= Robinson Ekspeditionen 2017 =

- Season 2017
- Presented by: Jakob Kjeldbjerg
- No. of days: 45
- No. of castaways: 27
- Winner: Marlene Berardino
- Runners-up: Isabella Romani; Bjørn Scharling Larsen
- Location: Caramoan, Philippines
- No. of episodes: 13

Release
- Original network: TV3
- Original release: August 28 – November 20, 2017

Season chronology
- ← Previous; 2016 Next → 2018

Robinson Ekspeditionen 2017 was the nineteenth season of the Danish version of Swedish television series Expedition Robinson. The season premiered on August 28, 2017. The main twist this season is that the two tribes are divided based by age. The North Team consisting of the oldest contestants, and the South Team consists of the youngest. In addition, the East Team consists of five former Robinson contestants who return for a second chance to have a chance to become this year's Robinson unbeknownst to the others. A returning feature this season is the duel. However, in this season, the winner of the duel has their tribe exempt from participating in the immunity challenge and therefore, safe from tribal council. The loser of the duel is sent home and has to have their tribe compete in the immunity challenge against the tribe that finished second.

== Finishing order ==
Notable cast members include Line Simone Pedersen, a panel contestant on Dagens Mand.

Contestant	Original Tribe	Switched Tribe	Absorbed Tribe	Swapped Tribe	Merged Tribe	Finish
Daniel Jensen; 39, Roskilde	Gamle					1st Voted Out; Day 4
Patricia Eskelund-Hansen; 22, Albertslund	Unge					Quit; Day 5
Johan Djørup Müller; 26, Roskilde; Season 18, 23rd Place	Unge	South Team				Lost Duel; Day 6
Andreas Marco Jensen; Returned to Game	Unge	East Team				2nd Voted Out; Day 7
Brian Bolgan; 43, Herlev	Gamle	East Team				Medically evacuated Day 8
Thomas Valentin Jakobsen; Returned to Game	Gamle	North Team				Lost Duel; Day 9
Emma Brøgger Kristoffersen; 23, Kongens Lyngby	Unge	South Team				3rd Voted Out; Day 10
Mathias Lynge; 24, Copenhagen; Season 18, 4th Place		East Team				Ejected; Day 11
Michael "Backer" Backer; 29, Valby; Season 15, 8th Place		East Team				Ejected; Day 11
Ditte Isabell Büchmann; 40, Frederiksberg; Season 12, 13th Place		East Team				Lost Duel; Day 12
Andreas Marco Jensen; 23, Copenhagen	Unge	East Team				4th Voted Out; Day 14
Tina Bianca Mosekjær Madsen; 30, Aarhus; Season 17, 11th Place		East Team				Quit; Day 16
Michael Mårtensson; 40, Taastrup	Gamle	North Team	North Team			5th Voted Out; Day 17
Thomas Valentin Jakobsen; 30, Copenhagen	Gamle	East Team	North Team			Eliminated by South Team; Day 19
Maja Hassel Toubro; 43, Havdrup	Gamle	North Team	North Team			Quit; Day 19
Line Simone Pedersen; 25, Asnæs	Unge	South Team	South Team			6th Voted Out; Day 20
Jesper Blok; 27, Kastrup	Unge	South Team	South Team	North Team		Quit; Day 23
Pernille Mehlskov; 30, Copenhagen	Gamle	North Team	North Team	North Team		Quit; Day 23
Bettina "Tammaro" Tammaro; 50, Solrød Strand; Season 15, 5th Place		East Team	North Team	North Team		7th Voted Out; Day 28
Anne Kofoed Edelved; 49, Holbæk	Gamle	East Team	South Team	South Team	Robinson	8th Voted Out; Day 31
Sofie Burgdorf; 24, Copenhagen	Unge	South Team	South Team	South Team	Robinson	9th Voted Out; Day 35
Nicolai Benthien Frederiksen; 18, Langeskov	Unge	South Team	South Team	South Team	Robinson	10th Voted Out; Day 38
Line "Hentze" Hentze Sørensen; 28, Aarhus	Gamle	North Team	North Team	South Team	Robinson	Lost Duel; Day 40
Flemming Rasmussen; 47, Juelsminde	Gamle	North Team	North Team	North Team	Robinson	11th Voted Out; Day 41
Endri Sopa; 20, Albertslund	Unge	South Team	South Team	South Team	Robinson	Lost Challenge; Day 42
Mads Flint Pedersen; 21, Odense	Unge	South Team	South Team	South Team	Robinson	Lost Challenge; Day 44
Bjørn Scharling Larsen; 36, Valby	Gamle	North Team	North Team	North Team	Robinson	2nd Runner-Up; Day 45
Isabella Romani; 22, Copenhagen	Unge	South Team	South Team	South Team	Robinson	Runner-Up; Day 45
Marlene Berardino; 40, Copenhagen	Gamle	North Team	North Team	North Team	Robinson	Robinson; Day 45

== Season summary ==
Challenge winners and eliminations by episode
Episode		Challenge winner(s)			Eliminated	Finish
No.	Original air date	Duel	Reward		Eliminated	Finish
No.	Original air date	Duel	Reward	Immunity	Eliminated	Finish
1	28 August 2017	None	Gamle	Unge	Daniel	1st Voted Out; Day 4

== Voting history ==
	Original Tribes		Switched Tribes										Absorbed Tribes				Tribal Swap				Merged Tribe							
Episode #:	1	2			3			4				5		6			7			8	9	10	11	12		13		
Eliminated:	Daniel; 10/12 votes^{1}	Patricia; No vote	Johan; No vote	Andreas; 5/5 votes^{2}	Brian; No vote	Thomas; No vote	Emma; 5/8 votes	Mathias; No vote	Backer; No vote	Ditte; No vote	Andreas; 4/5 votes	Tina; No vote^{3}	Michael; 6/9 votes	Thomas; 3/3 votes^{4}	Maja; No vote	Line; 7/8 votes	Jesper; No vote^{5}	Tie^{6}	Pernille; 0/6 votes^{7}	Tommaro; 5/6 votes^{8}	Anne; 6/13 votes^{9}	Sofie; 6/11 votes^{10}	Nicolai; 5/10 votes^{11}	Hentze; No vote	Flemming; 5/7 votes^{12}	Endri; No vote^{13}	Mads; No vote^{14}	Marlene
Eliminated:	Daniel; 10/12 votes^{1}	Patricia; No vote	Johan; No vote	Andreas; 5/5 votes^{2}	Brian; No vote	Thomas; No vote	Emma; 5/8 votes	Mathias; No vote	Backer; No vote	Ditte; No vote	Andreas; 4/5 votes	Tina; No vote^{3}	Michael; 6/9 votes	Thomas; 3/3 votes^{4}	Maja; No vote	Line; 7/8 votes	Jesper; No vote^{5}	Tie^{6}	Pernille; 0/6 votes^{7}	Tommaro; 5/6 votes^{8}	Anne; 6/13 votes^{9}	Sofie; 6/11 votes^{10}	Nicolai; 5/10 votes^{11}	Hentze; No vote	Flemming; 5/7 votes^{12}	Endri; No vote^{13}	Mads; No vote^{14}	Isabella
Eliminated:	Daniel; 10/12 votes^{1}	Patricia; No vote	Johan; No vote	Andreas; 5/5 votes^{2}	Brian; No vote	Thomas; No vote	Emma; 5/8 votes	Mathias; No vote	Backer; No vote	Ditte; No vote	Andreas; 4/5 votes	Tina; No vote^{3}	Michael; 6/9 votes	Thomas; 3/3 votes^{4}	Maja; No vote	Line; 7/8 votes	Jesper; No vote^{5}	Tie^{6}	Pernille; 0/6 votes^{7}	Tommaro; 5/6 votes^{8}	Anne; 6/13 votes^{9}	Sofie; 6/11 votes^{10}	Nicolai; 5/10 votes^{11}	Hentze; No vote	Flemming; 5/7 votes^{12}	Endri; No vote^{13}	Mads; No vote^{14}	Bjørn
Voter	Vote																											
Marlene	Daniel												Michael					Flemming	Lost	Tommaro	Mads	Mads	Nicolai		Flemming	Safe		1st
Isabella							Line							Thomas		Line					Marlene	Mads	Nicolai	Won	Flemming	Won	Safe	2nd
Bjørn	Daniel												Pernille					Marlene (x2)		Tommaro	Anne	Sofie	Marlene	Won	Flemming	Won	Won	3rd
Mads							Emma									Line					Anne	Sofie	Marlene	Won	Flemming	Won	Lost	
Endri							Emma			2nd				Thomas		Line	Lost				Anne	Sofie	Marlene		Flemming	Lost	Mads	
Flemming	Daniel												Michael					Marlene	Won	Tommaro (x2)	Anne	Sofie	Nicolai		Mads		Isabella	
Hentze	Daniel												Michael								Mads	Mads	Nicolai	Lost			Isabella	
Nicolai							Emma							Thomas		Line					Anne	Sofie	Marlene				Mads	
Sofie							Line									Line					Marlene	Mads					Isabella	
Anne	Daniel			Andreas							Andreas					Line					Marlene						Isabella	
Tammaro	Not in game			Andreas							Andreas		Michael					Flemming		Bjørn							Mads	
Pernille	Daniel												Michael					Flemming										
Jesper							Emma					Lost				Line	Won											
Line							Emma									Anne												
Maja	Daniel		2nd										Michael															
Thomas	Daniel					Lost					Andreas		Maja															
Michael	Daniel									1st		1st	Pernille															
Tina	Not in game			Andreas		1st					Andreas	2nd																
Andreas											Thomas																	
Ditte	Not in game			Andreas						Lost																		
Backer	Not in game																											
Mathias	Not in game																											
Emma						2nd	Line																					
Brian	Daniel		1st	Andreas																								
Johan			Lost																									
Patricia																												
Daniel	Maja																											

^1 As Hentze came last in the opening challenge she was penalized with an automatic vote at the first tribal council.

^2 As Andreas, Backer and Mathias were caught asking for food from fishermen at a village the contestants had filmed near earlier they were told they would be punished. Their punishment was that they had voided their team's immunity, previously won by Brian at the duel challenge, and would need to attend a special tribal council in which only the three of them could not vote and were only ones who could be voted for. The South team, who had lost the immunity and duel challenge, were granted safety.

^3 Despite losing the duel, Jesper was allowed to remain in the competition as Tina voluntarily left the competition following the duel.

^4 As reward for winning the team duel against the three members of the North team, the South team representatives, Endri, Isabella and Nicolai were told they would vote out one the three North team representatives, Bjørn, Pernille or Thomas.

^5 Following his win at the duel against Endri, Jesper volunteered to leave the game in Endri's place. Endri's team was then given the immunity initially won by Jesper.

^6 For winning the immunity challenge in episode 7 Bjørn was rewarded with two votes at North team's next tribal council.

^7 Due to the tie at tribal council Flemming and Marlene were forced to take part in a duel to determine who would be eliminated. As Marlene lost the duel she was to be the one eliminated from the game, however Pernille volunteered to leave in her place.

^8 For winning the immunity challenge in episode 8 Flemming was rewarded with two votes at North team's next tribal council. South team was also allowed to cast a vote for winning the duel.

^9 As they lost the duel (Sofie) and immunity challenge (Anne and Mads) Anne, Mads and Sofie each received an automatic vote at tribal council in episode 9.

^10 As they lost the duel (Mads) and immunity challenge (Sofie) Mads and Sofie each received an automatic vote at tribal council in episode 10.

^11 As they lost the duel (Nicolai) and immunity challenge (Hentze) Nicolai and Hentze each received an automatic vote at tribal council in episode 11.

^12 As she lost the immunity challenge Isabella received an automatic vote at tribal council in episode 12.

^13 As reward for winning plank at the start of the final Marlene was automatically given a spot in the final challenge and immunity from the last two elimination challenges.

^14 As she received the most jury votes to proceed to the final challenge of Bjørn, Isabella and Mads, Isabella was granted the second spot in the final challenge and did not have to take part in the final elimination.
