= Stilling-Solbjerg Lake =

- Stilling-Solbjerg Sø
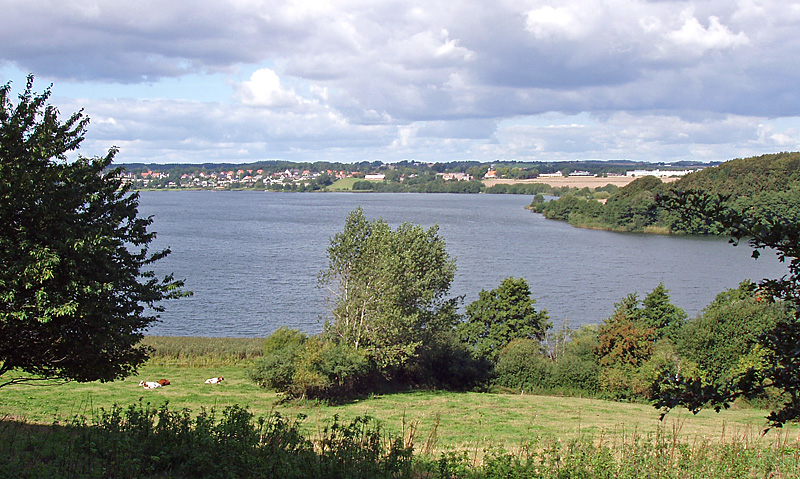
- Stilling Lake, the western part of the double-lake. The town of Stilling can be seen on the horizon.

- Location within Denmark
- Location: Aarhus and Skanderborg Municipality
- Coordinates: 56°03′38″N 10°02′50″E
- Type: Lake
- Primary inflows: Løjenkær Bæk, Møddebro Bæk, Vitved Bæk, Pilbro Bæk, Blegindmose Bæk
- Primary outflows: Aarhus river
- Surface area: 383 hectares (950 acres)
- Average depth: 8.1 metres (27 ft)
- Max. depth: 19 metres (62 ft)
- Water volume: 31,000,000 cubic metres (1.1×10^{9} cu ft)

Stilling-Solbjerg Lake (Danish: Stilling-Solbjerg Sø) is a lake in Jutland, Denmark between Stilling in Skanderborg Municipality and Solbjerg in Aarhus Municipality. The lake is 7 km long and it is a part of the upper section of Aarhus river. In Stilling the lake is also known as Stilling Lake, in Solbjerg it is known as Solbjerg Lake and in Fregerslev it is known as Fregerslev Lake. Stilling-Solbjerg Lake and the areas around it are a protected area. The area includes the lake and the valley Pilbrodalen. It was protected in 1964 and 1965 by the Danish Nature Agency.

The lake is not freely accessible from all directions, but there are large recreational areas with jetties and benches by the lake in both Stilling and Solbjerg. From the north side, the lake is accessible from Søgårde. The lake is home to the training facilities of Skanderborg Vandski Klub (Skanderborg Water Ski Club).

== Legends ==
There are a number of myths and legends associated with the lake and its surroundings. One of the more recent is from the Torstensson War against Sweden from 1643 to 1645. It was said that the generals of king Christian IV always travelled with a chest of silver to pay for mercenaries. In the winter of 1643-1644, Skanderborg Castle was besieged by Swedish forces and a group of Danish soldiers attempted to secure the silver and bring it to Aarhus. However, the soldiers were discovered by a group of Swedish soldiers and the Danes then made a hole in the ice and, while under fire, dropped the contents of the chest into the lake to prevent the Swedes from getting hold of it.

== Environmental conditions ==
Stilling-Solbjerg Lake is characterized by high levels of calcium and is categorized as a lake type 10 in the Danish lake classification system. Bathing is allowed and deemed safe and Stilling Beach Park is a Blue Flag beach.

The lake suffers from high levels of chlorophyll, in the 2010s some 2.5 times higher than the ideal target. There has previously been pollution with especially phosphorus and nitrogen from both agriculture and untreated wastewater from residential areas. The problems have abated since the 1980s due to an active effort on part of the bordering municipalities. The level of agricultural runoff has decreased dramatically but the level of phosphorus remains largely unchanged due to accumulation in the lake sediment. In August and September there's usually some degree of cyanobacterial growth and algal blooms.

Stilling-Solbjerg Lake has a diverse flora and fauna. There are 13 registered species of vegetation, although coverage is only some 2% of the lake bottom and it is unstable due to the high levels of phosphorus and nitrogen. There are a total of 10 fish species including pike, rudd, roach, bream, perch, zander, European eel, gasterosteiformes and burbot. The dominating species are roach and perch, while zander is well established.
