= Harlev =

- Town
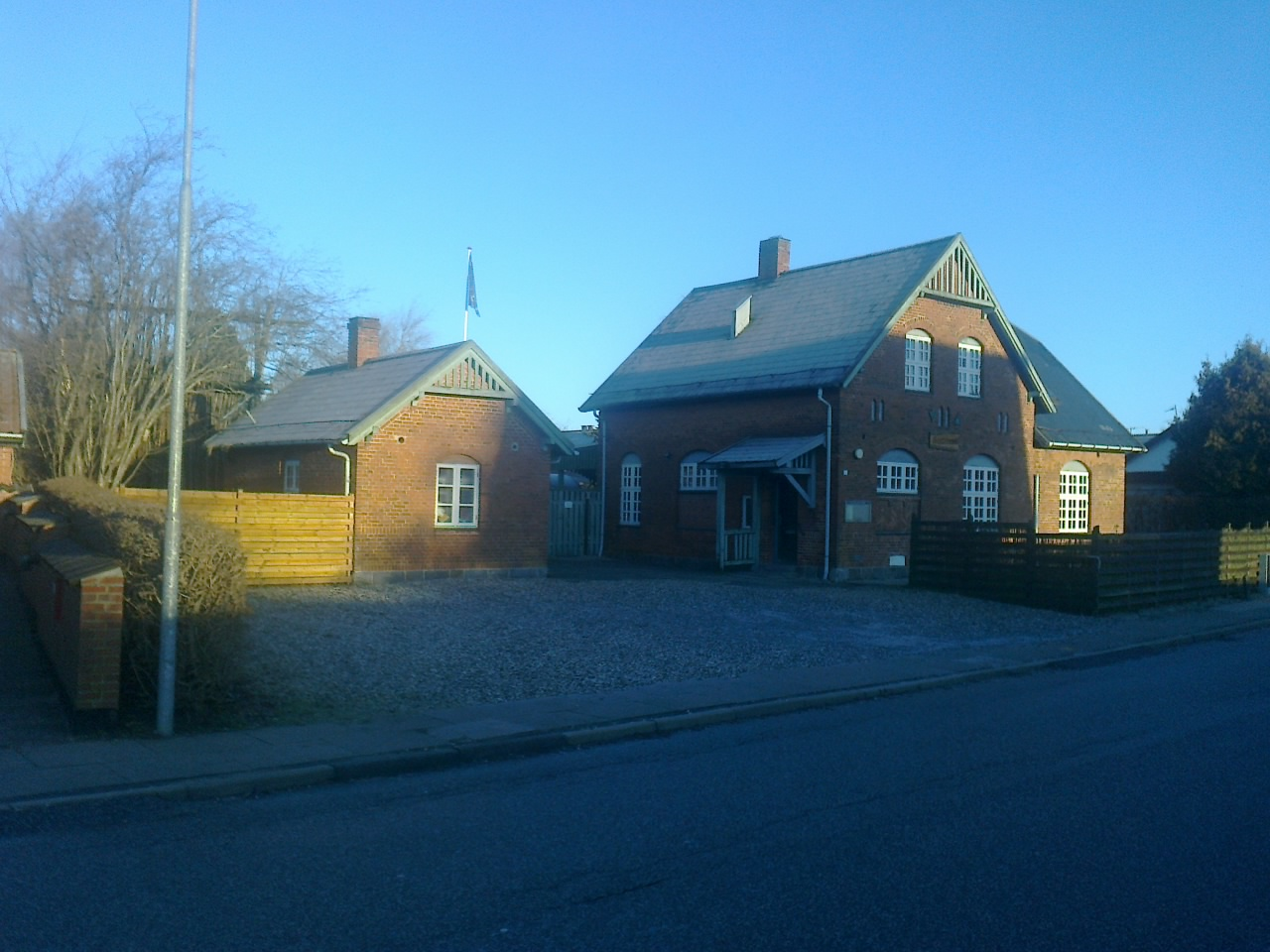
- The former station building in Harlev

- Location in Denmark Harlev (Central Denmark Region)
- Coordinates: 56°8′41″N 9°59′49″E
- Country: Denmark
- Region: Region Midtjylland
- Municipality: Aarhus Municipality

Area
  - Urban: 1.9 km^{2} (0.73 sq mi)

Population (2026)
  - Urban: 4,112
  - Urban density: 2,200/km^{2} (5,600/sq mi)
  - Gender: 1,989 males and 2,123 females
- Time zone: UTC+1 (CET)
  - Summer (DST): UTC+2 (CEST)
- Postal code: DK-8462 Harlev J

Harlev is a former railway town in Aarhus Municipality in Denmark, with a population of 4,112 as of 1 January 2026. It is a suburb only 13 kilometres west of central Aarhus and is located at the Danish national road 15.

== History ==
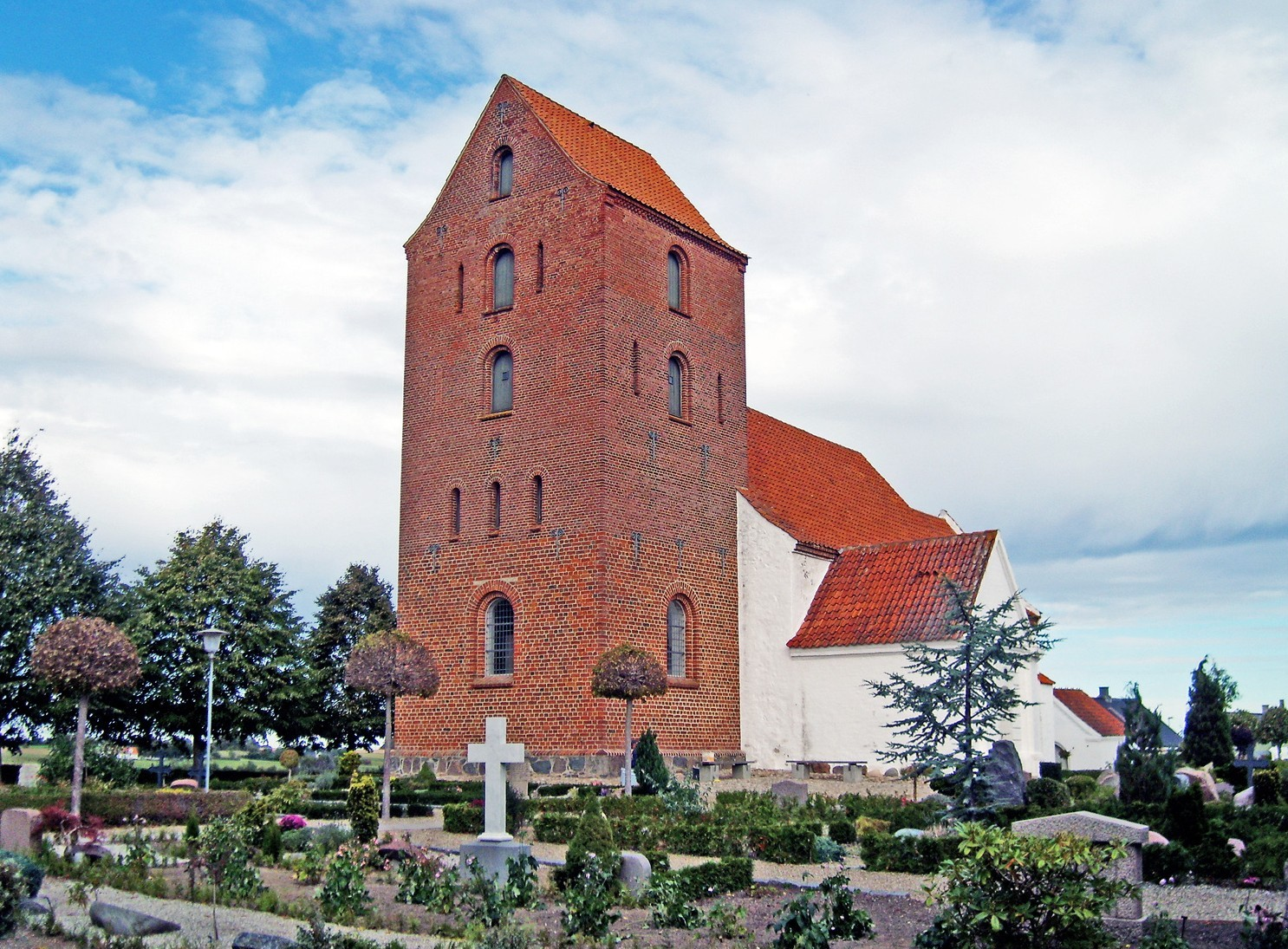
Harlev church in Gammel Harlev.

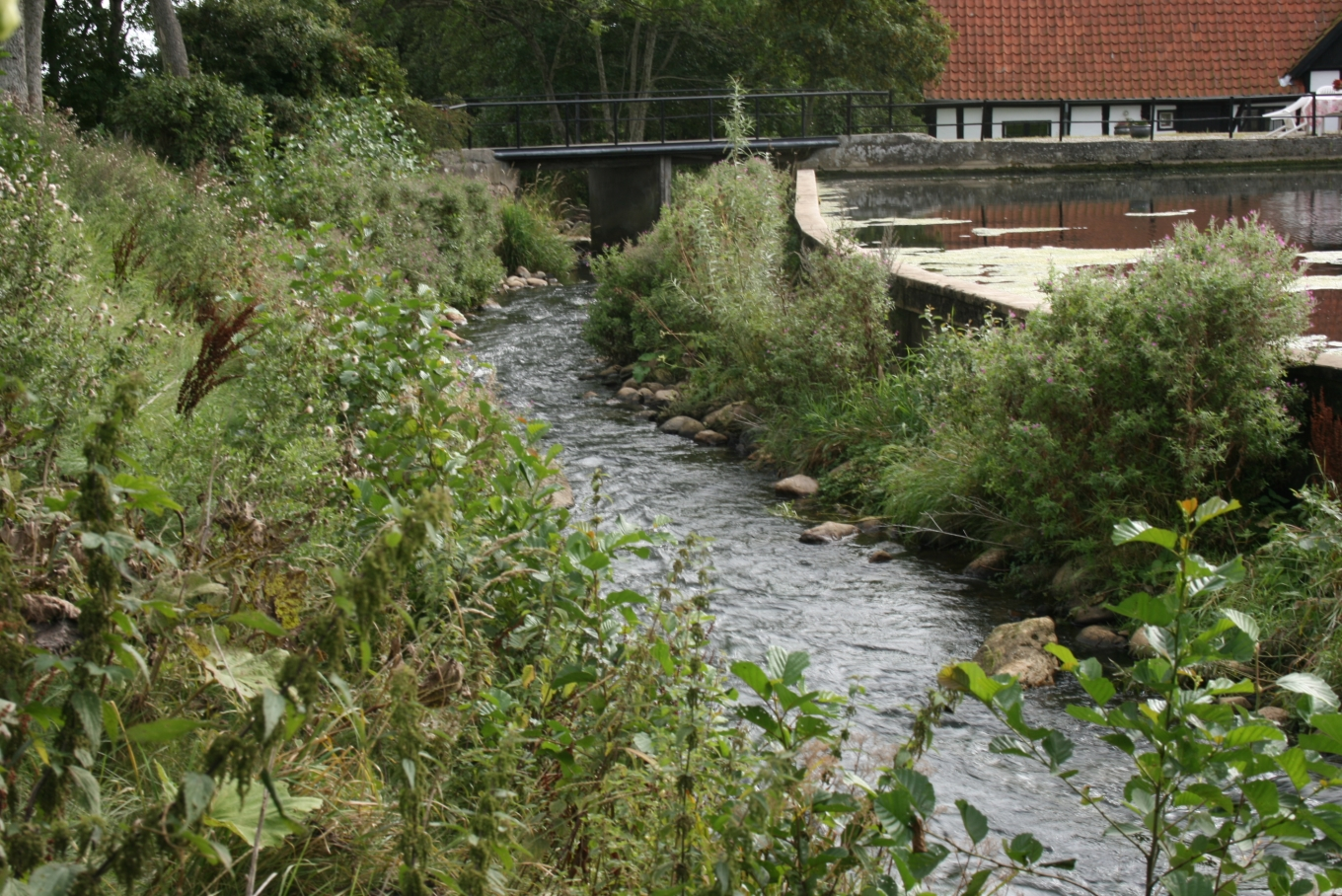
The river bend with Harlev watermill

Harlev developed as a railway town in 1902 when a train station of the former Hammelbanen rail road line was built on a field between the villages of Gammel Harlev and Framlev. Harlev church is still situated 1½ kilometre out of town in the older settlement of Gammel Harlev (lit.: Old Harlev). Hammelbanen formerly connected the inland town of Hammel with the port city of Aarhus and was important for the transportation of agricultural products, but it was decommissioned in 1956. The former train station in Harlev has since been restored and is currently headquarters to a local scouting group. Because of the position between Gammel Harlev and Framlev, the citizens of Harlev are still divided between the parishes of Harlev and Framlev.

== Gammel Harlev ==
The village of Gammel Harlev, situated at a bend of the Aarhus River 1½ km from Harlev, is a much older settlement. Harlev church has been dated to around 1100 AD, and is thus among the first churches in Denmark. Harlev watermill from 1733 is no longer active as a watermill, but has been restored and repurposed as a conference center.

The entire parish of Harlev was once part of the extensive Skanderborg Equestrian District (Skanderborg Rytterdistrikt) until 1784.

== Notable people ==
- Henrik Wann Jensen (born 1969 in Harlev) a Danish computer graphics researcher

== Sources ==
- Archive of local history (in Danish)
