= Aarhus (river) =

Aarhus River
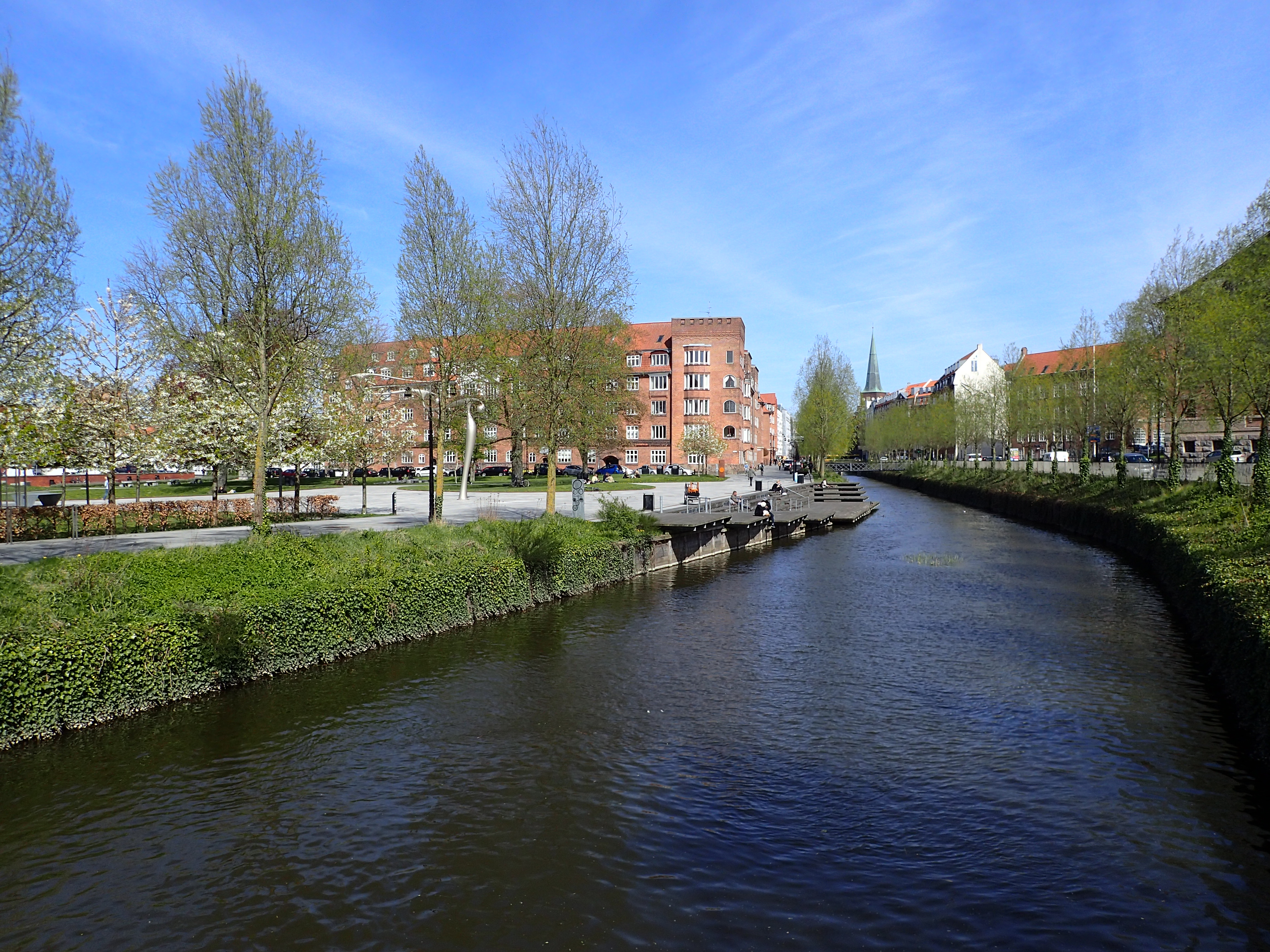
- Århus Å flowing through the city centre of Aarhus. Here at Mølleparken close to its mouth on Aarhus Harbour.

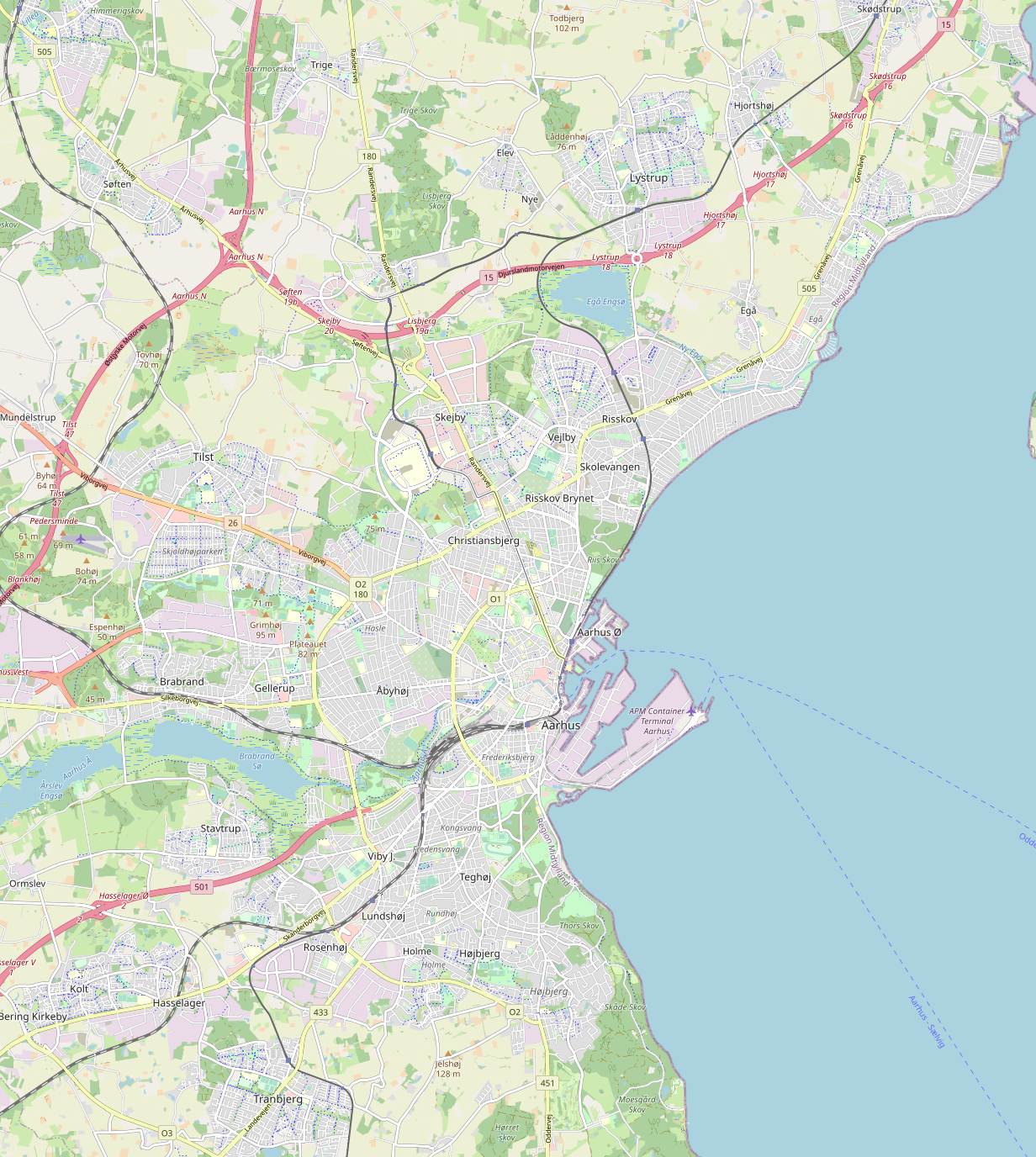
- Location within Aarhus Location within Denmark
- Native name: Århus Å (Danish)

Location
- Country: Denmark
- Region: Jutland
- District: Central Denmark Region
- Municipality: Skanderborg Municipality, Aarhus Municipality

Physical characteristics
- Source: Astrup Mose
  - location: Skanderborg Municipality
  - coordinates: 56°1′47.8″N 10°5′37.9″E
  - elevation: 54 m (177 ft)
- Mouth: Port of Aarhus
  - location: Aarhus Bay
  - coordinates: 56°9′9.6″N 10°12′48.5″E
  - elevation: 0 m (0 ft)
- Length: 40 km (25 mi)
- Basin size: 324 km^{2} (125 sq mi)

Aarhus River (Danish: Århus Å) is a 40-kilometre (25 mi) long river, in eastern Jutland, Denmark.

The river flows through the large river valley of Aarhus Ådal. The valley itself, stretches from Silkeborg to the coastal city of Aarhus, but the Aarhus River only runs through the easternmost parts. The river drains a basin of 324 square kilometres (125 mi^{2}) in the eastern part of Søhøjlandet and discharges into the Bay of Aarhus which is an embayment of the Kattegat. It originates 54 metres (177 ft) above sea level in the swampy bogland of Astrup Mose close to Stilling-Solbjerg Lake, southwest of the city of Aarhus (56°6' northern latitude, 10°9' eastern longitude) and exits into Aarhus Harbour at 56°9' northern latitude, 10°13' eastern longitude. The river defines the border between Skanderborg and Aarhus Municipality during its first few kilometres.

== History ==
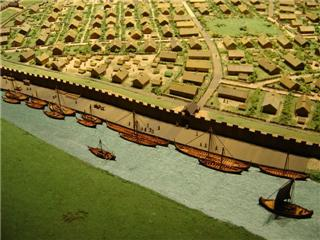
Aarhus River was important for the early development of Aarhus since the 8th century

Aarhus River has been important for the development of the city of Aarhus since its foundation in the early Viking Age, and archaeological and historical research suggests that it played a crucial role in the origins of the city.

There used to be a sizeable catch of eel, and to a lesser degree pike, in the Aarhus River up until the later part of the 20th century. Several families, often based at the rivers' watermills, made a living from it with the Brabrand Lake as the most productive fishing spot. As seen the world over, eel went into a rapid decline and with it the local fishing industry in the Aarhus River dried up. Through the 20th century, the river and its ecosystem went into a serious decline due to nutrient pollution from household wastewater and farmland run-off. Today, after some costly efforts to restore the damaging effects of the destructive eutrofication, the ecosystem and biodiversity of the Aarhus River is recovering and now includes a wide range of fish species once again. Two former fish farms along the Aarhus River at Pinds Mølle and Gammel Harlev has been re-purposed as put-and-take spots with trout for sports fishing.

With the advance of the automobile, the river's run through the city of Aarhus was paved over and covered by roads in the years 1930-1958. In the process, the last long stretch was named Åboulevarden and created a new transport route to the thriving industrial harbour. In 1989, it was politically decided that Aarhus River should be opened again, and the project commenced in September 2005. In 2008, the reopened section of the river at Åboulevarden was inaugurated, and work on the last section at the harbor front began, finishing in 2015.

== Gallery ==
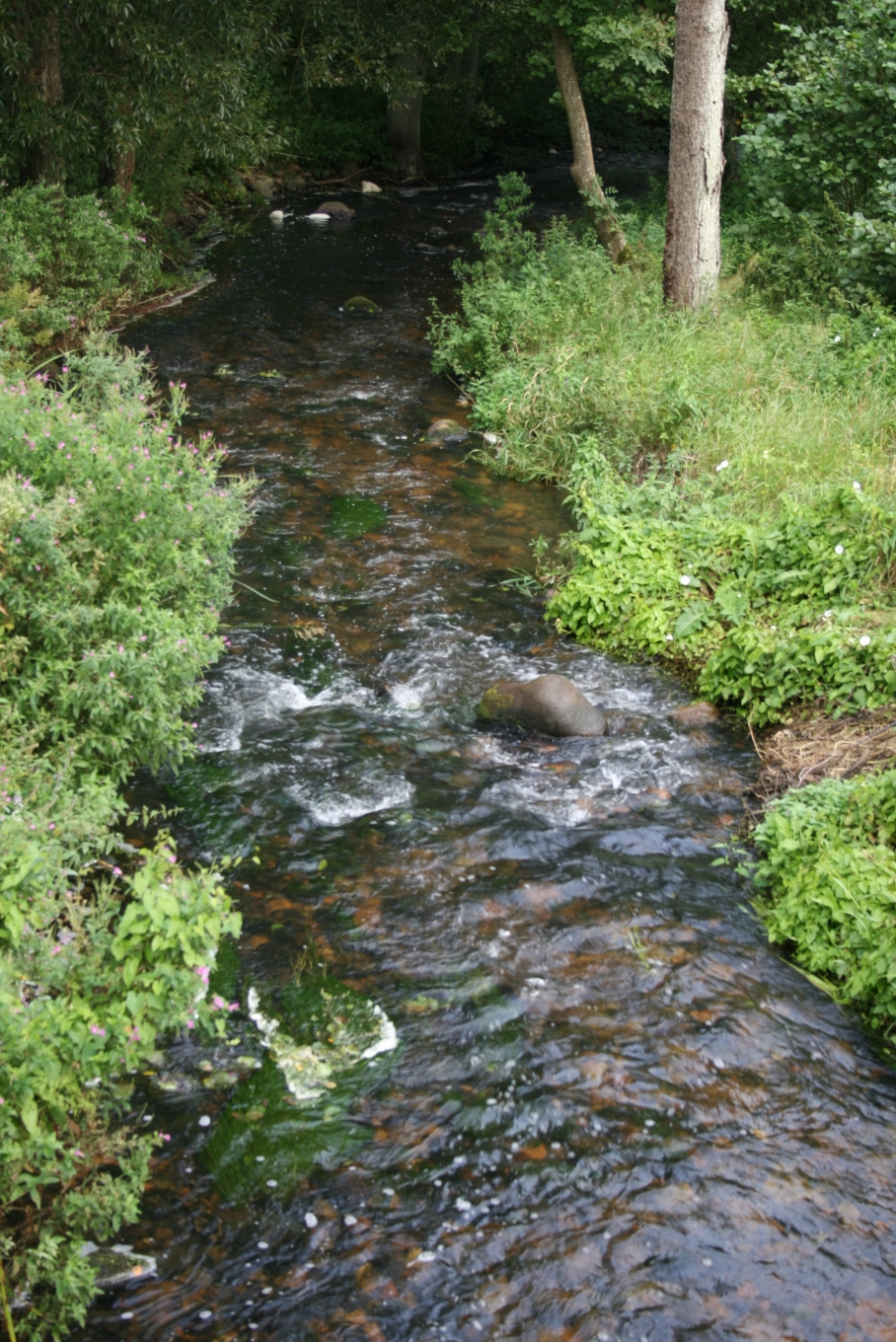
In Jeksendalen. Before the Brabrand Lake, Århus Å is rather small

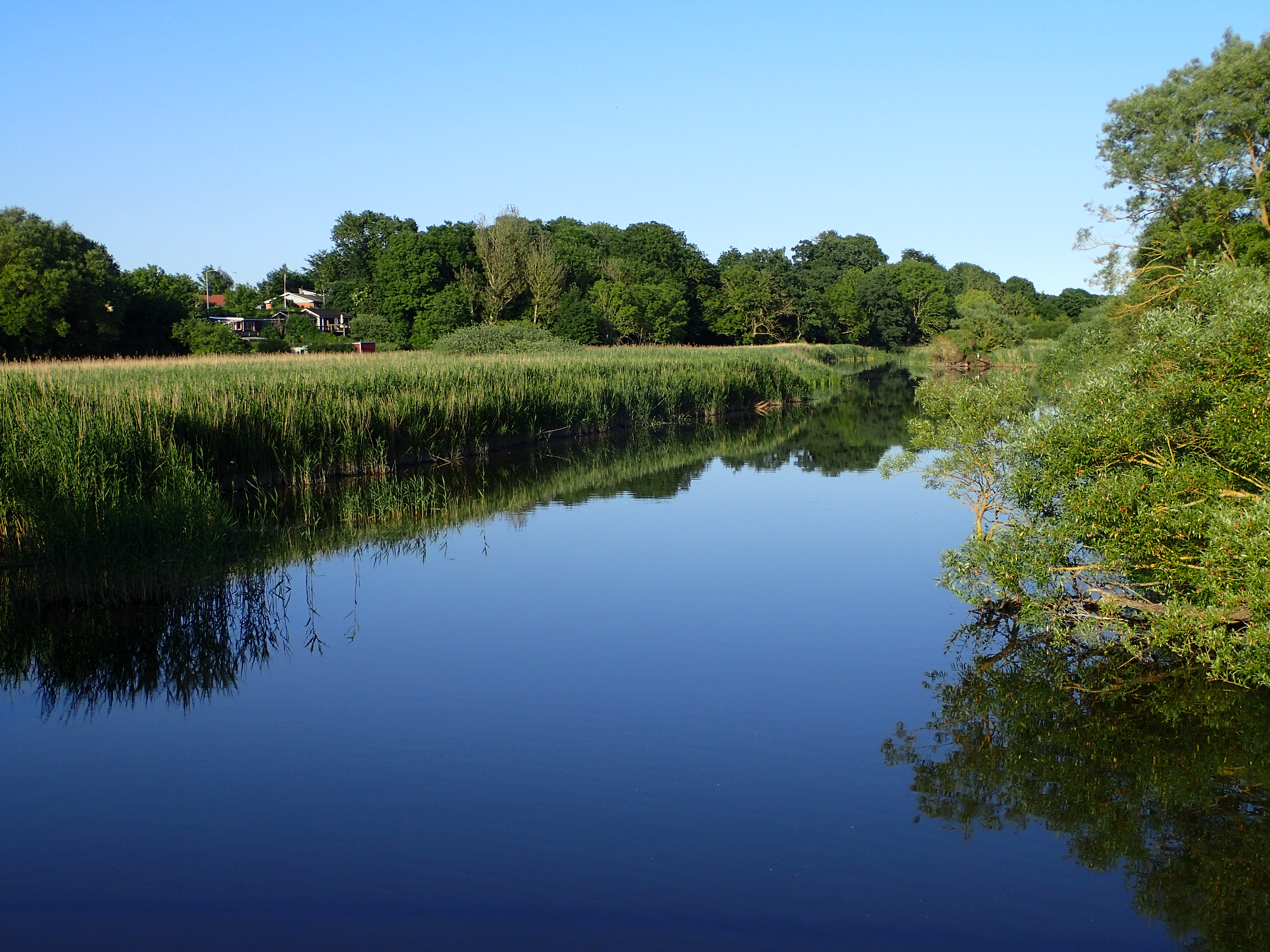
Århus Å, immediately after the Brabrand Lake

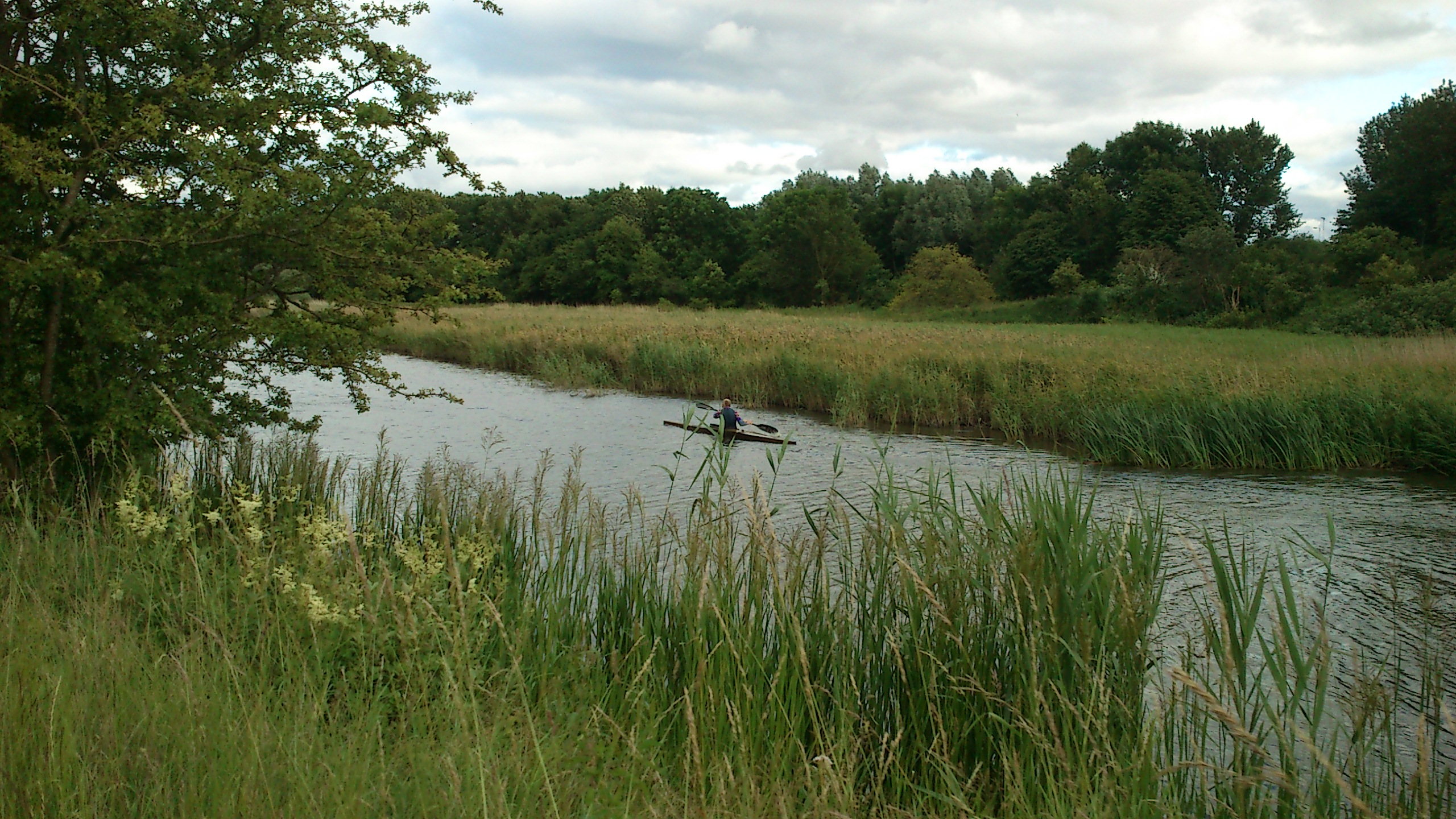
Kayaking

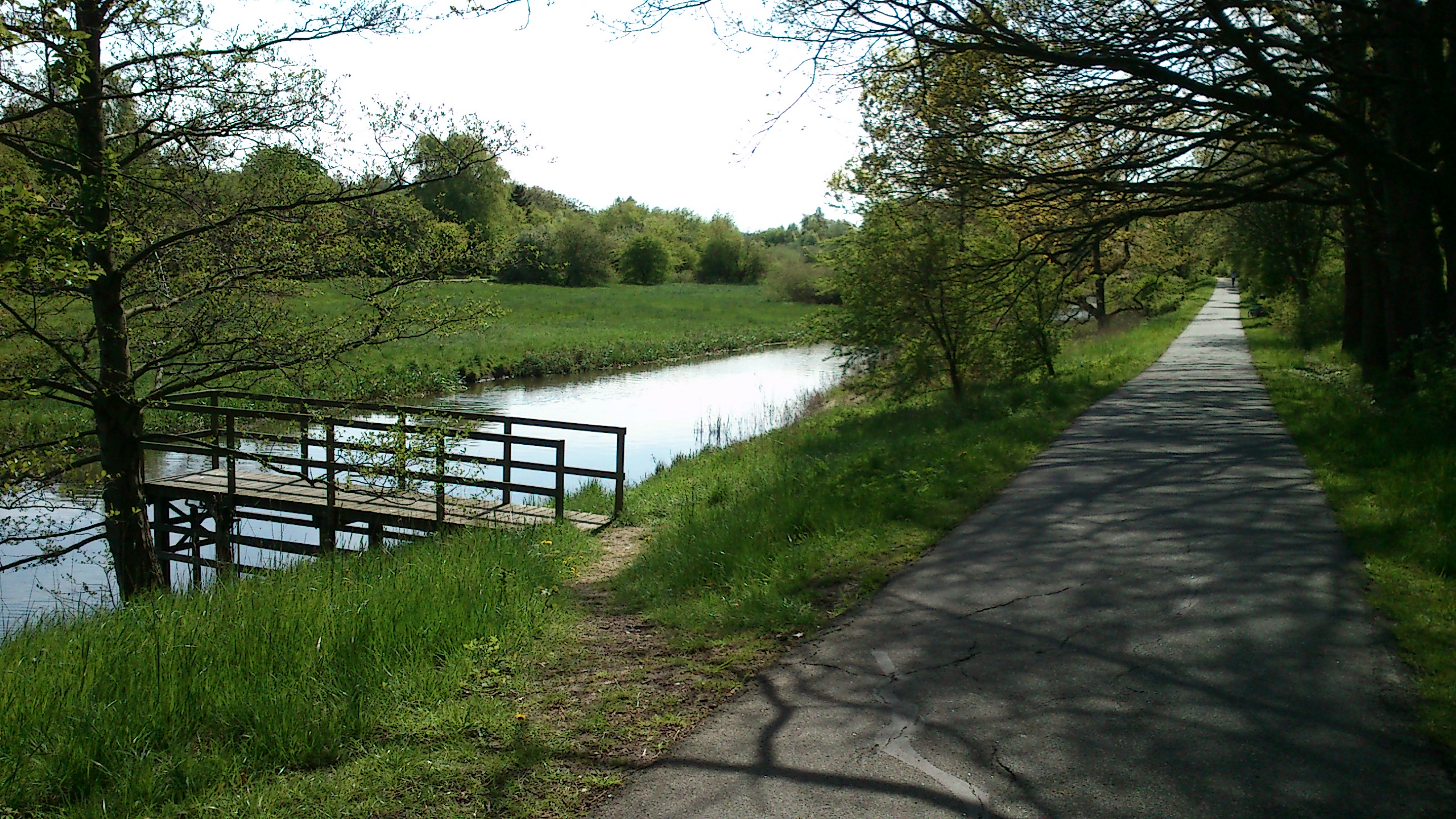
Along the Brabrandstien pathway

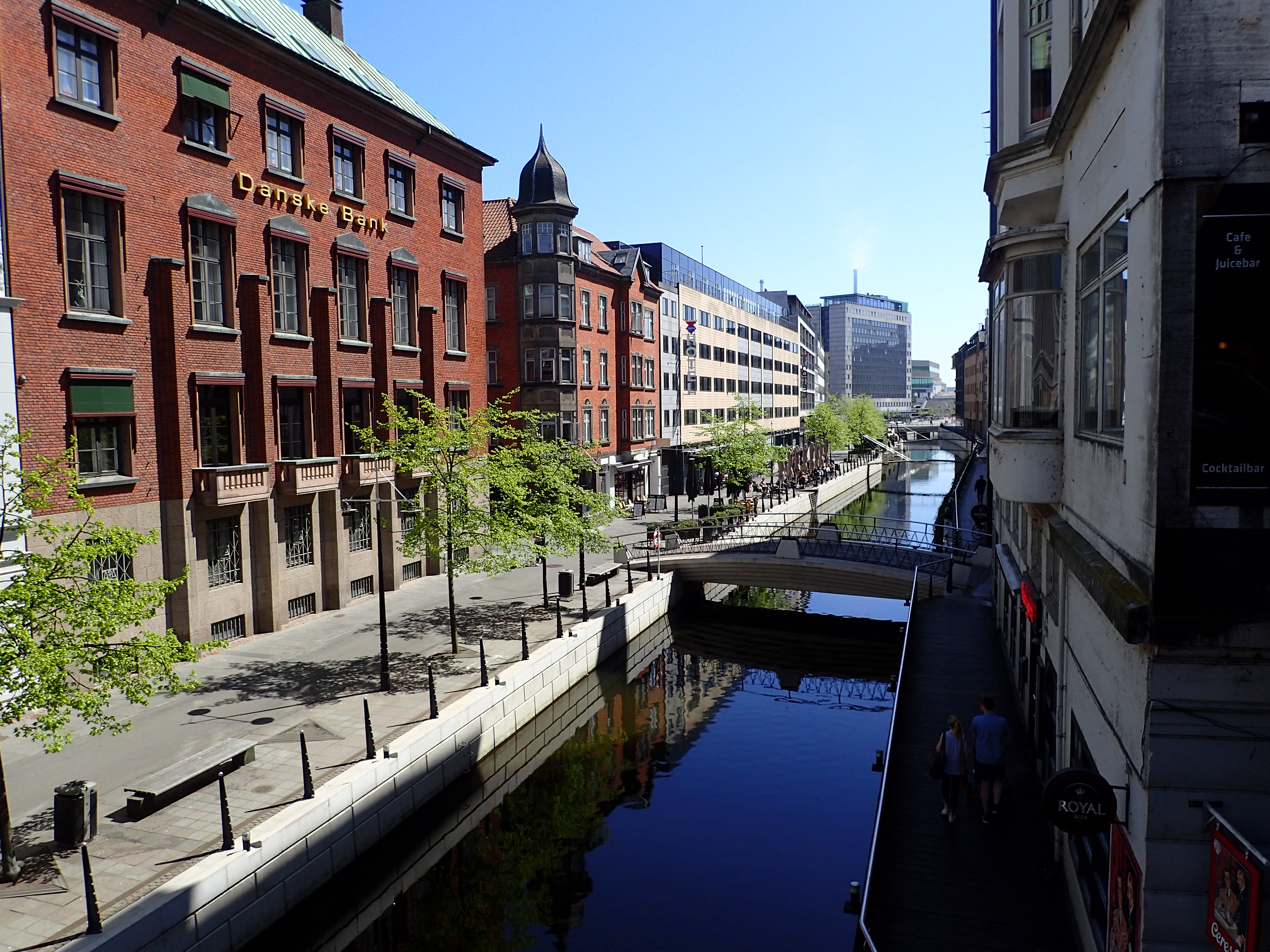
In the city of Aarhus

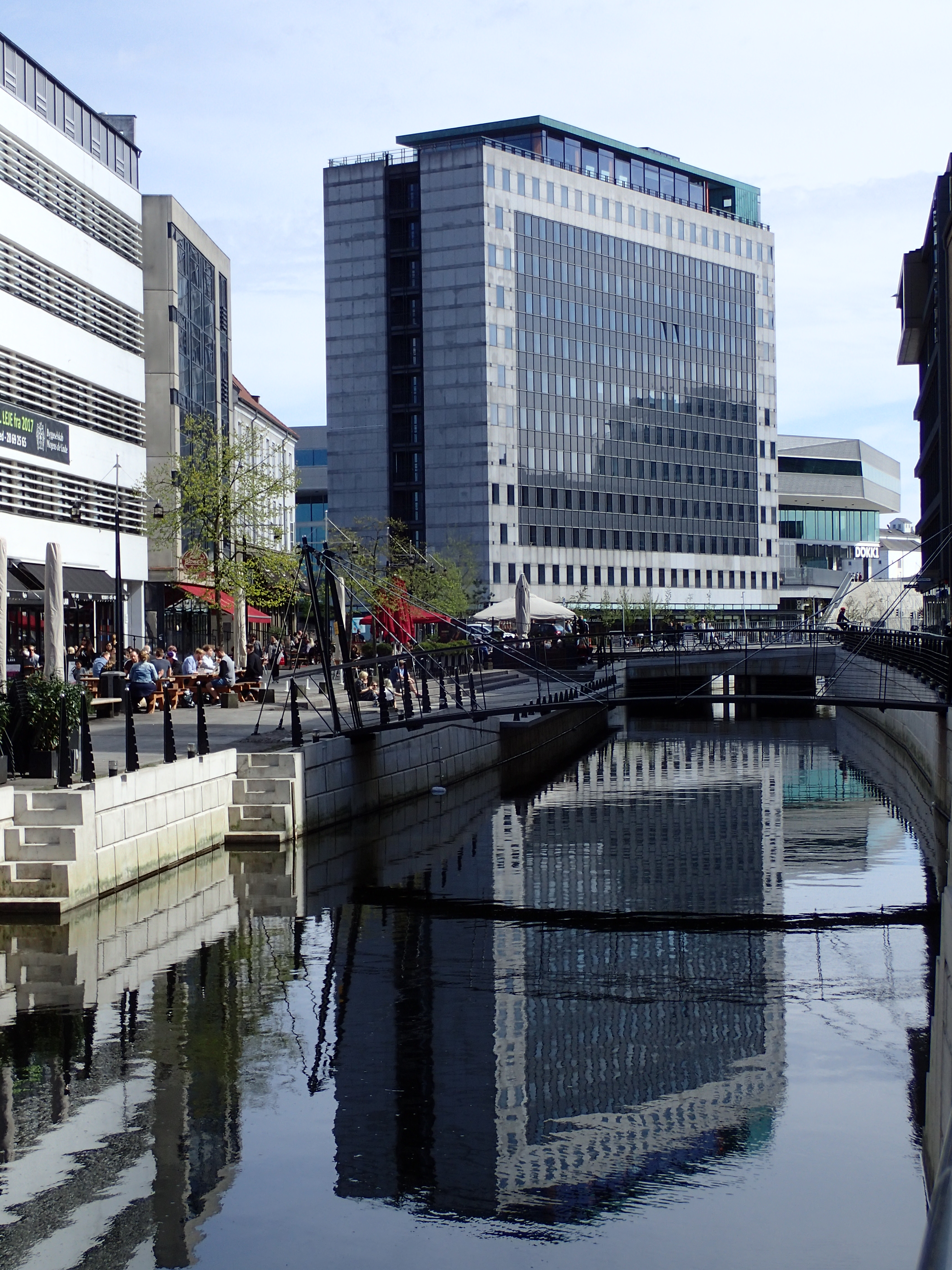

== Sources ==
- Søren Olsen: "Danmarks Søer og Åer" ISBN 87-567-6364-6 (in Danish)
- Fode, Henrik (red.): "Århus Å - Natur og mennesker", Århus Byhistoriske Fond (2009) (in Danish)
- Barbara Højlund & Frederik Schildt Nabe-Nielsen (2011): Århus Viking Ship Museum (in Danish)
- Christina Jessen (2011): Aarhus Danmarkshistorien.dk, Aarhus University (in Danish)
